= Henry Tulse =

Henry Tulse may refer to:

- Henry Tulse (died 1642), English MP
- Henry Tulse (died 1697) (1636–1697), English MP
- Henry Tulse (Lord Mayor), Lord Mayor of London
