= George Skivington =

English rugby union player

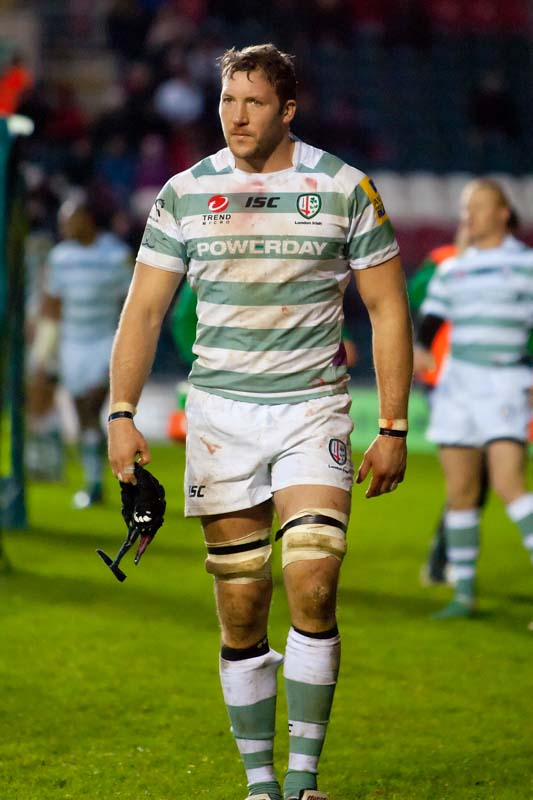
- Skivington replaced during a match against Leicester Tigers on 18 November 2012
- Born: George Skivington; 3 December 1982 (age 43) Warrington, England
- Height: 2.0 m (6 ft 6 1/2 in)
- Weight: 110 kg (17 st 5 lb)
- School: The John Fisher School

Rugby union career
- Position: Lock
Amateur team(s)
Years	Team	Apps	(Points)
–	Saracens Academy		
Senior career
Years	Team	Apps	(Points)
- Saracens
2003–2010	London Wasps	124	(40)
2010–2012	Leicester Tigers	50	(10)
2012–2016	London Irish	62	(25)
- Correct as of 17 September 2015
International career
Years	Team	Apps	(Points)
2008–2010	England Saxons		
Coaching career
- Years: Team
- 2016–2020: London Irish (Forwards Coach)
- 2015: Samoa (Assistant Coach)
- 2020–: Gloucester (Head Coach)
- 2023–2026: Gloucester (Director of Rugby)
- 2024: England A (Head Coach)

George Skivington (born 3 December 1982) is an English professional rugby union coach and former player. He is the current head coach of Premiership Rugby side Gloucester.

== Early life and education ==
Skivington was born in Warrington, Cheshire.

Skivington played junior rugby at London Irish. He attended Wimbledon College and then moved to John Fisher School in Purley (also attended by fellow Ex-Wasp and England winger Paul Sackey and Scotland prop Kyle Traynor) before joining the Saracens Academy.

== Playing career ==
Skivington played for Saracens, London Wasps (a successful period for the club, including being coached by Warren Gatland), Leicester Tigers, London Irish, and England Saxons. His position was lock. He captained both London Irish and England Saxons.

=== Club career ===
Skivington joined London Wasps in 2001. In 2008, he signed a contract keeping him at the club until 2010.

On 14 April 2010, it was announced that Skivington would be moving away from Wycombe to join Premiership rivals Leicester Tigers at the end of the season. His final game for Leicester was the Premiership final at Twickenham against Harlequins.

On 23 January 2012, it was announced that Skivington would be joining London Irish from the start of the 2012/2013 season. He played 62 times for London Irish, and captained them, before retiring in June 2016 (age 33) due to an ongoing shoulder injury.

=== International career ===
Skivington was called into the England Saxons side that defeated Ireland A on 1 February 2008. He later represented England Saxons at the 2008 Churchill Cup. On 28 January 2010, he was named captain of the England Saxons side to play Ireland A at Bath's Recreation Ground on Sunday 31 January. He led his team to a 17–13 victory, and again against Italy A. Skivington also lead the Saxons throughout their victorious Churchill Cup campaign in summer 2010.

Skivington was called up to England's 2011 Six Nations Championship squad on 24 January 2011 as injury cover for Courtney Lawes.

== Coaching career ==
=== Ealing Trailfinders ===
Whilst still playing, Skivington acted as assistant coach at Ealing Trailfinders from 2014 – 2016. Helping Ealing gain promotion from National 1 League in 2014/15 and a successful campaign in the championship in 2015/16.

=== London Irish ===
After his playing retirement from London Irish, Skivington was immediately appointed as Forwards Coach.

=== Samoa ===
Skivington was also an assistant coach for Samoa in 2015 for their historic game against the All Blacks in Apia, Samoa on 8 July 2015 where they lost 25–16. Skivington was then part of the Samoan coaching team for the 2015 Pacific Nations Cup and the 2015 World Cup in England.

=== Gloucester ===
In June 2020, Skivington was announced as the new head coach of Gloucester Rugby after the departure of both head coach Johan Ackermann and director of rugby David Humphreys. London Irish have announced publicly they believe the appointment breached protocol. The claim has been denied by Gloucester.

=== England A ===
On 10 January 2024, Skivington took charge of the England A squad to play against Portugal in February 2024.

=== Coaching characteristics ===
Skivington has highlighted the importance of player character and overall group contribution, communication, and the value of squad competition for places.
