= Edmund Haviland-Burke (Christchurch MP) =

Edmund Haviland-Burke (27 January 1836 – 17 June 1886) was a British politician, member of parliament for Christchurch from 1868 to 1874.

He was only son of Thomas William Aston Haviland-Burke (1795–1852) and a great-grandnephew of Edmund Burke. A son, Edmund Haviland-Burke, was Irish Parliamentary Party MP for Tullamore from 1900 to 1914.

He died in Dublin.

== Notes ==
Parliament of the United Kingdom
Preceded by John Edward Walcott	Member of Parliament for Christchurch; 1868–1874	Succeeded by Henry Drummond Wolff
