= Robert Adley (British politician) =

British politician (1935–1993)

Member of Parliament for Christchurch Christchurch and Lymington (1974–1983)
- In office 28 February 1974 – 13 May 1993
- Preceded by: constituency established
- Succeeded by: Diana Maddock

Member of Parliament for Bristol North East
- In office 18 June 1970 – 28 February 1974
- Preceded by: Raymond Dobson
- Succeeded by: Arthur Palmer

Personal details
- Born: 2 March 1935 England
- Died: 13 May 1993 (age 58) Royal Brompton Hospital, London, England
- Party: Conservative
- Education: Falconbury School; Uppingham School
- Profession: Politician

Robert James Adley (2 March 1935 – 13 May 1993) was a Conservative Party politician in the United Kingdom and a railway enthusiast.

== Early life and family ==
Robert James Adley born on 2 March 1935, the son of Harry Adley, a company director. He was educated at Falconbury School and Uppingham School, before becoming the Director of Sales at the May Fair Hotel (1960–64). In 1961, he married Jane Elizabeth Pople, daughter of Wilfred Pople of Somerset. Later, he was the Marketing Director at Holiday Inns of Canada.

Adley was born Jewish but converted to Anglicanism, and was married with two children.

== Political career ==
He was a councillor on Slough Borough Council from 1965 and first stood for Parliament in 1966 for Birkenhead, failing to win the strongly Labour seat. He became Member of Parliament for Bristol North East after winning the seat by 462 votes in the 1970 election. However, significant boundary changes before the next election in 1974 saw Adley move on to become member of parliament for the new seat of Christchurch and Lymington. In the 1970s Adley was part-time Marketing Director for Holiday Inn (UK). He would brief his agency (Alexander James & Dexter) in the morning, before going to the House of Commons. He would safely hold this seat from 1974 to 1983, and then after further boundary changes the Christchurch seat from 1983 until his death with one of the largest Conservative majorities in the country.

Adley was well known as a railway enthusiast, after gaining a love of trains when he was given The Wonder Book of Trains at the age of three. Adley became leader of the Conservative backbench committee on transport and then the Chairman of the Commons Transport Select Committee. He became a leading opponent of the plans being made by John Major's government for the privatisation of British Rail, describing it a "poll tax on wheels". Adley had previously opposed the poll tax and bus deregulation, while supporting Concorde and an integrated transport system. Adley also called for talks with the African National Congress and for the UK government to support the aspirations of the black majority in apartheid-era South Africa.

== Death ==
Adley died in the Royal Brompton Hospital following a heart attack in 1993 at the age of 58. After his death the seat was won in a by-election by Liberal Democrat Diana Maddock, but was regained by the Conservatives in 1997. British Rail named locomotive 91022 Robert Adley in November 1993.

== Author ==
Adley was the author of numerous books mainly on the subject of railways and in particular steam engines.

- British Steam in Cameracolour. Shepperton: Ian Allan Publishing. 1979. ISBN 0-7110-0987-2.
- In Search of Steam 1962–1968. Poole: Blandford Press. 1981. ISBN 0-7137-1091-8.
- The Call of Steam. Poole: Blandford Press. 1982. ISBN 0-7137-1274-0.
- To China for Steam. Poole: Blandford Press. 1983. ISBN 0-7137-1344-5.
- All Change Hong Kong. Poole: Blandford Press. 1984. ISBN 0-7137-1468-9.
- In Praise of Steam. Poole: Blandford Press. 1985. ISBN 0-7137-1626-6.
- Wheels. Shepperton: Ian Allan Publishing. 1987. ISBN 0-7110-1700-X.
- Covering My Tracks. Wellingborough: Patrick Stephens Ltd. 1988. ISBN 0-85059-882-6.
- Out of Steam. Wellingborough: Patrick Stephens Ltd. 1990. ISBN 1-85260-202-3.
- Countdown to 1968 – The Decline And Fall of Steam. Poole: Oxford Publishing Co. 1993. ISBN 0-86093-492-6.

Parliament of the United Kingdom
| Preceded by Raymond Dobson | Member of Parliament for Bristol North East; 1970–Feb 1974 | Succeeded by Arthur Palmer |
| New constituency | Member of Parliament for Christchurch and Lymington; Feb 1974–1983 | Constituency abolished |
| New constituency | Member of Parliament for Christchurch; 1983–1993 | Succeeded by Diana Maddock |
