= A. L. F. Rivet =

British archaeologist and cartographer

Albert Lionel Frederick Rivet
- Born: 30 November 1915; Streatham, London
- Died: 6 September 1993 (aged 77)
- Citizenship: British
- Occupations: Archaeologist, cartographer

Academic background
- Education: Oriel College

Academic work
- Institutions: Ordnance Survey; Keele University
- Notable works: The Place-Names of Roman Britain (1979); Gallia Narbonensis (1988)

Albert Lionel Frederick Rivet, FBA (30 November 1915 – 6 September 1993) was a British archaeologist and cartographer.

== Biography ==
Albert Lionel "Leo" Frederick Rivet was born on 30 November 1915 in Streatham, London, the only son of Albert Robert Rivet (1879–1955) and Rose Mary Bulow (1880–1960). He attended Falconbury School from 1923 to 1929, gained a scholarship to Felsted School, then entered Oriel College, Oxford in 1934 to study classics. R. G. Collingwood's lectures at Oriel arouse Rivet's interests in archaeology. He briefly worked as a schoolmaster in 1938–1939, then enlisted as a private soldier in the Royal Corps of Signals in East Africa, serving as a major from 1940 to 1946. Rivet worked as a bookseller during five years after January 1946, first in Cambridge, then in Crowborough. He married Audrey Catherine Webb (1925–2018) in 1947.

In 1952, he obtained the post of Assistant Archaeology Officer in the Ordnance Survey, where he was responsible for the production of historical period maps. Rivet participated in the redaction of the third edition of the Map of Roman Britain (1956), then published Town and Country in Roman Britain in 1956. He moved to Keele University in 1964, where he became Professor of Roman Provincial Studies. He wrote many publications including The Place-Names of Roman Britain (1979), co-written with Colin Smith, and Gallia Narbonensis (1988).

Rivet served as president of the academic journal Britannia from 1977 to 1980, and as a vice-president thereafter. He was also a member of the Royal Commission on Historical Monuments, the British School at Rome, and the British Academy.

Rivet died on 6 September 1993, nearly two years after a severe stroke.
