= National Schools Sevens =

English rugby union sevens tournament

The Rosslyn Park National Schools Sevens is an English rugby union sevens tournament, organised by Rosslyn Park F.C., that has evolved into the world's largest rugby tournament with some 9,500 boys and girls aged 13 – 19 competing annually from over 800 schools. There are now well over 1,100 matches on the 5 groups of pitches (each one having its own Ground Management Team) every year. A separate tournament for the U11 age group takes place the week before.

Originally a tournament played amongst British public schools, the tournament has evolved and expanded over the years and now accepts sides from all over the world. Countries from which schools have participated included Canada, China, Denmark, Guernsey, Hungary, India, the Isle of Man, Jersey, Kenya, Nigeria, Poland, Romania, South Africa, Spain, and Ukraine as well as England, Ireland, Scotland and Wales.

== NS7 Open Titles ==
School	Wins
Millfield School	14
Ampleforth College	11
Wellington College	11
Neath School	4
Sedbergh School	5
Stonyhurst College	3
Llanelli School	3
Rugby School	3
St. Edward's College, Liverpool	3
Cheltenham College	2
The John Fisher School	2
Bedford School	2
Cranleigh School	2
Llandovery College	2
Uppingham School	2
Blundells School	1
Brighton College	1
Sevenoaks School	1
Harrow School	1
Douai School	1
Mount St Mary's College	1
King's College, Taunton	1
Sherborne School	1
St. Cyres Comprehensive	1

== Format ==
The play for the tournament is centred on Wimbledon Common and adjoining land to the south, where there are 24 pitches having outgrown the original home of the tournament at Rosslyn Park's home ground at nearby Priory Lane. All the pitches are close together and there is just a short walk between them all.

Each Tournament has a similar format of Group matches on the first day with possibly a knockout round or two. The second day is for the knockout rounds, which culminate in the relevant Final. The Junior Tournament and the Preparatory Tournament (both under 13s) start on the Monday, the Festival (one term rugby schools) starts Tuesday, the Colts (under 16s) Wednesday, and the Girls Tournament and Open Tournament (both under 18s) start on Thursday.

== History ==
There has been some recent speculation (November 2008) about the reasons for the Schools 7s' inception. Research by Richard Cable of the BBC shows that Rosslyn Park started holiday games for schoolboys following the Great War. These were held in January and were believed to be in commemoration of Rosslyn Park members killed in action. This was the beginning of a strong link between the club and youth rugby – something that continues to this day. In 1938, it was known that an internal tournament took place at the club in which members played as old boys representing their schools. The following year, and possibly as a result of some disagreement among the members as to whose school was better at "rugger", the Schools 7s was born.

The event was first held in 1939 and has been held every year since, becoming one of the oldest continuous tournaments for schools and the oldest ongoing schoolboy rugby tournament in England. The first tournament was won by St George's School, Harpenden, which was a fee-paying independent school at that time. It was intended to be a knock-out competition for English public schools but as interest grew it was extended to include state schools (both grammar and comprehensive) and preparatory schools. The format was also changed into pool groups so that no U16 or girls side played fewer than three matches and no U18 boys side fewer than four. Almost all the founding 16 schools compete to this day and, although it remains an invitation event, no eligible school would be refused entry upon application. In 1956, the Preparatory Schools competition was started for IAPS schools and in 1973 the Juniors (U13s) were held for the first time. In March 1997, a new competition was introduced for the U16s and it has been the policy during the past few years to invite schools from overseas who may be touring the UK to play in the tournament. Each year the number of schools applying increases. In 1998, the first girls (U18) competition was inaugurated, and a recent popular inclusion has been a sevens challenge match between Old Boys RFCs, the first of which was between Ampleforth and Millfield, who between them have won the senior tournaments a remarkable 21 times.

== Recent tournaments ==
In recent years Millfield have enjoyed the most success in the 'Open', although in 2004 Ivybridge Community College pipped them in the final, just 14 years after the school took up the sport. John Fisher School appeared in four Open finals between 1997 and 2009, winning twice. After Ben Gollings (currently world record points scorer on the IRB 7s circuit) took his Canford side to success in the 1997 Festival, the trophy was won either by Wellington or Cheltenham until Colston's School Bristol broke the trend in 2006. The 2003 final seemed certain to be a record five on the trot for Wellington with their impressive international line-up, but Cheltenham turned round a 0-12 half-time deficit to win. Cheltenham repeated their triumph the following year by beating Taunton, before Wellington College won again in 2005. Colston's won in 2006 (despite normally playing in the Open) and King's College, Taunton in 2007 after going close in previous years.

Colston's made history in 2007 by becoming the first school to win both the Open (U18 Boys) and the Girls' (U18) tournaments. Benenden School, in only its first season of rugby, pushed them all the way in the final before eventually losing 19–17. Colston's girls could not repeat their feat in 2008, falling to East Norfolk 6th Form College in a high-quality game, while Sedbergh won the Open Tournament. The 2008 tournament was broadcast live on the internet and was watched in over 30 countries.

In the 2009 tournament. Millfield continued their success, winning both the Open and the Colts tournament. In the Festival, Epsom College was defeated by Wellington College, while Neath Port Talbot ended Colston's Girls' dominance to take the title. In 2010, Millfield won the Open, Colts and Prep Schools tournaments; Tonbridge School beat Wellington in the Festival and Hartpury cruised to the Girls' title.

In 2011, HSBC became the tournament's sponsor. By now, the event had four separate food outlet centres, 32 exhibitors and a large screen for results and advertising. Film highlights from the previous day were uploaded the next morning and mixed with the advertising content on a large LED screen. On the pitch, Millfield's recent dominance faded and they failed to make the next day's play-off rounds in any of the competitions. South Gloucestershire and Stroud College won the Open, Hartpury College won the Girls' title and Tonbridge won the Colts.

In 2015 Wellington College beat John Fisher in the final 12–7. In 2016, Cranleigh School, one of the smaller schools in the competition, beat Harrow School to take the trophy, and repeated their success the following year by defeating Brighton College 28–7 in the final.

All the results are updated on the official website throughout each day.

== Previous Winners ==
Click to view list of previous winners

Year	Winner
2026	Wellington College
2025	Brighton College
2024	Millfield
2023	Harrow School
2022	Wellington College
2021	Cancelled
2020	Cancelled
2019	Sedbergh
2018	Sedbergh
2017	Cranleigh
2016	Cranleigh
2015	Wellington College
2014	Millfield
2013	Sedbergh
2012	Coleg Sir Gar
2011	SGS Filton College
2010	Millfield
2009	Millfield
2008	Sedbergh
2007	Colston’s
2006	Millfield
2005	Millfield
2004	Ivybridge Community College
2003	Millfield
2002	Millfield
2001	Cancelled
2000	Sedbergh
1999	Stonyhurst College
1998	John Fisher
1997	John Fisher
1996	Stonyhurst College
1995	St Cyres
1994	Millfield
1993	Millfield
1992	Llandovery College
1991	Neath College
1990	Neath College
1989	Ampleforth College
1988	Mount St Mary's College
1987	Millfield
1986	Warwick
1985	Neath College
1984	West Park, St Helens
1983	Millfield
1982	Millfield
1981	Sevenoaks
1980	Millfield
1979	St. Edward's College, Liverpool
1978	Regent House
1977	Ampleforth College
1976	Reigate Grammar
1975	St. Edward's College, Liverpool
1974	Belmont Abbey
1973	Cowley
1972	Neath College
1971	Normanton Grammar
1970	Llandovery College
1969	St. Edward's College, Liverpool
1968	Normanton Grammar
1967	Whitgift
1966	Millfield
1965	Coleraine
1964	King’s Canterbury
1963	Llanelly College
1962	Llanelly College
1961	Llanelly College
1960	Royal Belfast
1959	Douai
1958	Llanelly College
1957	Marlborough College
1956	KES Birmingham
1955	Oundle
1954	Uppingham
1953	Sherborne
1952	Llandovery College
1951	Christ's Hospital
1950	Rossall
1949	Stonyhurst College
1948	Taunton School
1947	Rugby
1946	Uppingham
1945	Rugby
1944	Haileybury
1943	Rugby
1942	Bedford
1941	Bedford
1940	Blundell’s
1939	St George’s, Harpenden

== Former players ==
The tournament is now recognised as a breeding ground for top British international rugby players, many of whom first started out playing in the competition.

England

- Ade Adebayo (Kelly, 1987)
- Rob Andrew (Barnard Castle, 1980)
- Iain Balshaw (Stonyhurst, 1997)
- Nick Beal (RGS High Wycombe, 1987/88)
- Kyran Bracken (Stonyhurst, 1990)
- Lawrence Dallaglio (Ampleforth, 1989)
- Will Carling (Terra Nova, 1975/76)
- Justyn Cassell (Dulwich, 1984)
- Matt Dawson (RGS High Wycombe, 1986, 1990/91)
- Phil Dowson (Sedbergh, 1999)
- Phil de Glanville (Bryanston, 1985)
- Ben Gollings (Canford, 1997)
- Andrew Harriman (Radley, 1981)
- James Haskell (Wellington, 2002)
- Damian Hopley (St Benedict's, 1982)
- Jonathan Joseph (Millfield, 2009)
- Tim Rodber (Churcher's, 1986)
- Chris Robshaw (Millfield, 2006)
- Paul Sackey (John Fisher, 1997 & 1998)
- Chris Sheasby (Caldicott, 1978 / Radley, 1983)
- James Simpson-Daniel (Sedbergh, 1999)
- Rory Underwood (Barnard Castle, 1980)
- Anthony Watson (St.George’s, Weybridge, 2015)

Wales

- Terry Price Llanelli 1963 and 64
- Gareth Edwards (Millfield, 1966)
- Keith Jarrett (Monmouth, 1967)

Colin Stephens (Stradey School, Llanelli 1989)

- Craig Quinnell (Llandovery, 1992)

Scotland

- Simon Danielli (Cheltenham, 1998)
- Joe McPartlin (Wimbledon College, 1955,1956,1957)

Ireland

- Mike McCarthy (Sedbergh, 1999)

Other notable former players include rugby coaches Les Cusworth (Normanton Grammar, 1970/71) and Peter Rossborough (King Henry VIII Coventry, 1967), Liam Botham (Rossall, 1995), horse trainer Ian Balding (Marlborough, 1957) and Queen Elizabeth's grandson Peter Phillips (Port Regis Prep/Gordonstoun).

== See also ==
- NatWest Schools Cup
- Sanix World Rugby Youth Tournament
