= Patrick McCartan =

Irish politician (1878–1963)

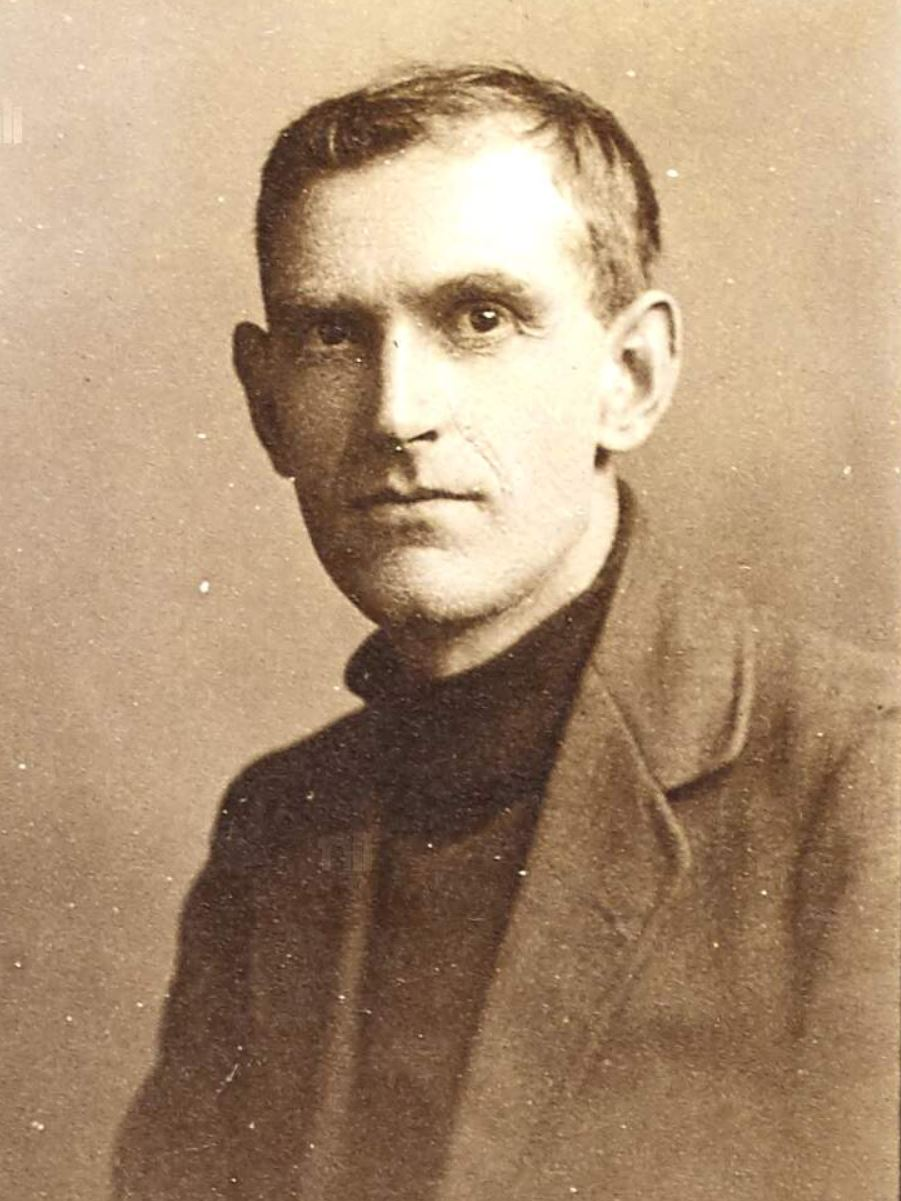
- McCartan in 1917

Teachta Dála
- In office June 1922 – August 1923
- In office May 1921 – June 1922
- Constituency: Leix–Offaly
- In office December 1918 – May 1921
- Constituency: King's County

Member of Parliament
- In office December 1918 – November 1922
- Constituency: King's County
- In office April 1918 – December 1918
- Constituency: King's County Tullamore

Senator
- In office 21 April 1948 – 14 August 1951
- Constituency: Nominated by the Taoiseach

Personal details
- Born: 13 May 1878 Carrickmore, County Tyrone, Ireland
- Died: 28 March 1963 (aged 84) Greystones, County Wicklow, Ireland
- Party: Sinn Féin; Clann na Poblachta
- Spouse: Elizabeth Kearney (m. 1937)
- Children: 2

Patrick McCartan (13 May 1878 – 28 March 1963) was an Irish republican and politician. He served the First Dáil (1919–1921) on diplomatic missions to the United States and Soviet Russia. He returned to public life in 1948, serving in Seanad Éireann for Clann na Poblachta. McCartan was a medical doctor graduating from the Royal College of Surgeons in Ireland.

== Early life and 1916 ==
He was born in Eskerbuoy, near Carrickmore, County Tyrone, one of five children, to Bernard McCartan, a farmer, and Bridget Rafferty (died 1918). He emigrated to the USA as a young man and became a member of Clan na Gael in Philadelphia, Pennsylvania and edited the journal Irish Freedom. He returned to Ireland some years later and qualified as a doctor. He also continued working with nationalist politics and worked closely with Bulmer Hobson and Denis McCullough with the Dungannon Clubs and the Irish Republican Brotherhood (IRB).

As a young man in 1906, McCartan called for tolerance while stating a goal of Irish republicanism: "...should be tolerant towards their countrymen no matter to what creed or class they belong. The Ireland we want is not a Catholic Ireland nor a Protestant Ireland, but an Irish-Ireland." In 1910 McCartan wrote in the IRBs newspaper Irish Freedom concerning his anti-Imperialism feelings and Irish freedom: "...the English Empire lives on the taxes wrung from the starving millions of India, and Ireland is asked to become a loyal portion of the Empire. We might perhaps share in the spoils we too might fatten on the Indians, the Egyptians and other subject races. Ireland, we are told, now will be loyal if she gets some concession, Home Rule or devolution, and will become part of the Empire of exploitation. There is little danger that Ireland will purchase a partial freedom at such a price. We would rather remain a nation of political serfs than become a nation of imperial parasites. Better far for Ireland never to be free than to win freedom by joining in with the pirate Empire, sharing in the guilt and the spoils of wholesale massacre and theft. There are other ways of obtaining freedom, and one of them is by joining hands with our Indian brothers, so that both they and we may be stronger to fight against British tyranny."

McCartan was to take part in the 1916 Easter Rising with the Tyrone volunteers but did not, owing to Eoin MacNeill's countermanding order. He was arrested after the Rising and interned in an open prison in England. Upon release from British prisons on 18 June 1917, the Commandants of the Irish Republican forces wrote an "Address of Irish Commandants to the President and Congress of the United States". The document explained the motivations for the rising and asked for immediate assistance in their cause. Dr. McCartan delivered the document to the Secretary to the President Joseph Patrick Tumulty in Washington.

== Elections ==
In 1917 he took "French leave" to return to Ireland and assist Sinn Féin in the by-elections being held throughout Ireland that year.

McCartan contested the by-election in South Armagh for Sinn Féin but lost out to the Irish Parliamentary Party candidate. He was later elected in a by-election in King's County Tullamore in 1918. He was re-elected in the 1918 general election.

He was re-elected for Leix–Offaly at the 1921 elections. He gave the Anglo-Irish Treaty his support, albeit reluctantly, in the Dáil debates, saying he would not "vote for chaos". He blamed the whole cabinet for the situation and said that "The Republic of which Mr. de Valera was President is dead." Disillusioned, he quit politics for the next twenty years.

== Diplomatic missions (1919–1921) ==
At the meeting of the First Dáil in January 1919 McCartan was appointed Sinn Féin's envoy in the USA where he would remain until 1921. In late 1920 McCartan outlined (in a formal protest sent to the US State Department) some of the atrocities being committed by British troops in Ireland. As envoy, one of his tasks was to secure American recognition before the Paris Peace Conference, 1919, but this proved impossible. While in the USA he renewed his acquaintance with his fellow Carrickmore native Joseph McGarrity. They persuaded Éamon de Valera to support the Philadelphia branch of Clan na Gael against the New York branch led by John Devoy and Judge Daniel Cohalan in their struggle to focus the resources of the Friends of Irish Freedom on Irish independence rather than domestic American politics. In 1920 McCartan helped organize the American Commission on Ireland (composed of 150 eminent Americans) which held public hearings in Washington on the causes and facts associated with the ongoing violence in Ireland. McCartan also assisted with the development of the "American Association for the Recognition of the Irish Republic".

McCartan then negotiated with Soviet Russia in 1920–1921 in an attempt to have it recognise the Irish Republic, at a time when both were pariah states. Although Soviet Russia was atheist, he hoped that Ireland could act as "accredited representative of the Republic of Ireland in Russia the interests of the Roman Catholic Church within the territory of the Russian Socialist Federal Soviet Republic. However such efforts failed and diplomatic relations were not established until decades later."

== Later political career ==
McCartan ran in a March 1925 by-election to the 1922 Seanad caused by the death of George Sigerson. He finished second of five candidates, losing to John O'Neill in the final ballot of senators by 30 votes to 29. He stood again in the September 1925 Seanad election, in which 19 seats were contested, finishing 74th of the 78 candidates in the nationwide poll.

In 1932, he published a book, With De Valera in America.

Although he was left-wing and Irish republican in political orientation, McCartan an active supporter of the pro-Axis front organisations such as Irish Friends of Germany, circa 1940.

He contested the 1945 presidential election as an independent candidate and secured 20% of the vote. He became a founder member of Clann na Poblachta and contested the 1948 general election without success. As the Minister of External Affairs in the new coalition government, his party leader Seán MacBride put his name forward, with fellow Ulsterman Denis Ireland, to be nominated by the Taoiseach John A. Costello to Seanad Éireann. He served as a Senator until 1951.

McCartan's daughter, Deirdre, was married to Irish folk musician Ronnie Drew.

== Sources ==
- Cronin, Sean, McGarrity Papers (Dublin 1971)
- Gaughan, J.A., Memoirs of Senator Joseph Connolly: A Founder of Modern Ireland (1996)
- The O'Brien Press, Kathleen Clarke: Revolutionary Woman (Cork 1991)

Parliament of the United Kingdom
| Preceded by Edward John Graham | Member of Parliament for King's County Tullamore; April 1918 – Dec. 1918 | Constituency abolished |
| New constituency | Member of Parliament for King's County; 1918–1922 | Constituency abolished |
Oireachtas
| New constituency | Teachta Dála for King's County; 1918–1921 | Constituency abolished |

| Dáil | Election | Deputy (Party) | Deputy (Party) | Deputy (Party) | Deputy (Party) | Deputy (Party) |
|---|---|---|---|---|---|---|
| 2nd | 1921 | Joseph Lynch (SF) | Patrick McCartan (SF) | Francis Bulfin (SF) | Kevin O'Higgins (SF) | 4 seats 1921–1923 |
| 3rd | 1922 | William Davin (Lab) | Patrick McCartan (PT-SF) | Francis Bulfin (PT-SF) | Kevin O'Higgins (PT-SF) | 4 seats 1921–1923 |
| 4th | 1923 | William Davin (Lab) | Laurence Brady (Rep) | Francis Bulfin (CnaG) | Patrick Egan (CnaG) | Seán McGuinness (Rep) |
| 4th | 1926 by-election | William Davin (Lab) | Laurence Brady (Rep) | Francis Bulfin (CnaG) | Patrick Egan (CnaG) | James Dwyer (CnaG) |
| 5th | 1927 (Jun) | William Davin (Lab) | Patrick Boland (FF) | Thomas Tynan (FF) | John Gill (Lab) | James Dwyer (CnaG) |
| 6th | 1927 (Sep) | William Davin (Lab) | Patrick Boland (FF) | Patrick Gorry (FF) | William Aird (CnaG) | James Dwyer (CnaG) |
| 7th | 1932 | William Davin (Lab) | Patrick Boland (FF) | Patrick Gorry (FF) | Thomas F. O'Higgins (CnaG) | Eugene O'Brien (CnaG) |
| 8th | 1933 | William Davin (Lab) | Patrick Boland (FF) | Eamon Donnelly (FF) | Thomas F. O'Higgins (CnaG) | Jack Finlay (NCP) |
| 9th | 1937 | William Davin (Lab) | Patrick Boland (FF) | Patrick Gorry (FF) | Thomas F. O'Higgins (FG) | Jack Finlay (FG) |
| 10th | 1938 | William Davin (Lab) | Patrick Boland (FF) | Patrick Gorry (FF) | Thomas F. O'Higgins (FG) | Daniel Hogan (FF) |
| 11th | 1943 | William Davin (Lab) | Patrick Boland (FF) | Patrick Gorry (FF) | Thomas F. O'Higgins (FG) | Oliver J. Flanagan (IMR) |
| 12th | 1944 | William Davin (Lab) | Patrick Boland (FF) | Patrick Gorry (FF) | Thomas F. O'Higgins (FG) | Oliver J. Flanagan (IMR) |
| 13th | 1948 | William Davin (Lab) | Patrick Boland (FF) | Patrick Gorry (FF) | Tom O'Higgins, Jnr (FG) | Oliver J. Flanagan (Ind.) |
| 14th | 1951 | William Davin (Lab) | Patrick Boland (FF) | Peadar Maher (FF) | Tom O'Higgins, Jnr (FG) | Oliver J. Flanagan (Ind.) |
| 15th | 1954 | William Davin (Lab) | Nicholas Egan (FF) | Peadar Maher (FF) | Tom O'Higgins, Jnr (FG) | Oliver J. Flanagan (FG) |
| 15th | 1956 by-election | Kieran Egan (FF) | Nicholas Egan (FF) | Peadar Maher (FF) | Tom O'Higgins, Jnr (FG) | Oliver J. Flanagan (FG) |
| 16th | 1957 | Kieran Egan (FF) | Nicholas Egan (FF) | Peadar Maher (FF) | Tom O'Higgins, Jnr (FG) | Oliver J. Flanagan (FG) |
| 17th | 1961 | Kieran Egan (FF) | Nicholas Egan (FF) | Patrick Lalor (FF) | Tom O'Higgins, Jnr (FG) | Oliver J. Flanagan (FG) |
| 18th | 1965 | Henry Byrne (Lab) | Nicholas Egan (FF) | Patrick Lalor (FF) | Tom O'Higgins, Jnr (FG) | Oliver J. Flanagan (FG) |
| 19th | 1969 | Ger Connolly (FF) | Bernard Cowen (FF) | Patrick Lalor (FF) | Tom Enright (FG) | Oliver J. Flanagan (FG) |
| 20th | 1973 | Ger Connolly (FF) | Charles McDonald (FG) | Patrick Lalor (FF) | Tom Enright (FG) | Oliver J. Flanagan (FG) |
| 21st | 1977 | Ger Connolly (FF) | Bernard Cowen (FF) | Patrick Lalor (FF) | Tom Enright (FG) | Oliver J. Flanagan (FG) |
| 22nd | 1981 | Ger Connolly (FF) | Bernard Cowen (FF) | Liam Hyland (FF) | Tom Enright (FG) | Oliver J. Flanagan (FG) |
| 23rd | 1982 (Feb) | Ger Connolly (FF) | Bernard Cowen (FF) | Liam Hyland (FF) | Tom Enright (FG) | Oliver J. Flanagan (FG) |
| 24th | 1982 (Nov) | Ger Connolly (FF) | Bernard Cowen (FF) | Liam Hyland (FF) | Tom Enright (FG) | Oliver J. Flanagan (FG) |
| 24th | 1984 by-election | Ger Connolly (FF) | Brian Cowen (FF) | Liam Hyland (FF) | Tom Enright (FG) | Oliver J. Flanagan (FG) |
| 25th | 1987 | Ger Connolly (FF) | Brian Cowen (FF) | Liam Hyland (FF) | Tom Enright (FG) | Charles Flanagan (FG) |
| 26th | 1989 | Ger Connolly (FF) | Brian Cowen (FF) | Liam Hyland (FF) | Tom Enright (FG) | Charles Flanagan (FG) |
| 27th | 1992 | Ger Connolly (FF) | Brian Cowen (FF) | Liam Hyland (FF) | Pat Gallagher (Lab) | Charles Flanagan (FG) |
| 28th | 1997 | John Moloney (FF) | Brian Cowen (FF) | Seán Fleming (FF) | Tom Enright (FG) | Charles Flanagan (FG) |
| 29th | 2002 | John Moloney (FF) | Brian Cowen (FF) | Seán Fleming (FF) | Olwyn Enright (FG) | Tom Parlon (PDs) |
| 30th | 2007 | John Moloney (FF) | Brian Cowen (FF) | Seán Fleming (FF) | Olwyn Enright (FG) | Charles Flanagan (FG) |
| 31st | 2011 | Brian Stanley (SF) | Barry Cowen (FF) | Seán Fleming (FF) | Marcella Corcoran Kennedy (FG) | Charles Flanagan (FG) |
| 32nd | 2016 | Constituency abolished. See Laois and Offaly. | | | | |
| 33rd | 2020 | Brian Stanley (SF) | Barry Cowen (FF) | Seán Fleming (FF) | Carol Nolan (Ind.) | Charles Flanagan (FG) |
| 33rd | 2024 | Brian Stanley (SF) | (Vacant) | Seán Fleming (FF) | Carol Nolan (Ind.) | Charles Flanagan (FG) |
| 34th | 2024 | Constituency abolished. See Laois and Offaly. | | | | |
