= 1993 Christchurch by-election =

UK parliamentary by-election

- 29 July 1993

Constituency of Christchurch
- Turnout: 74.2%
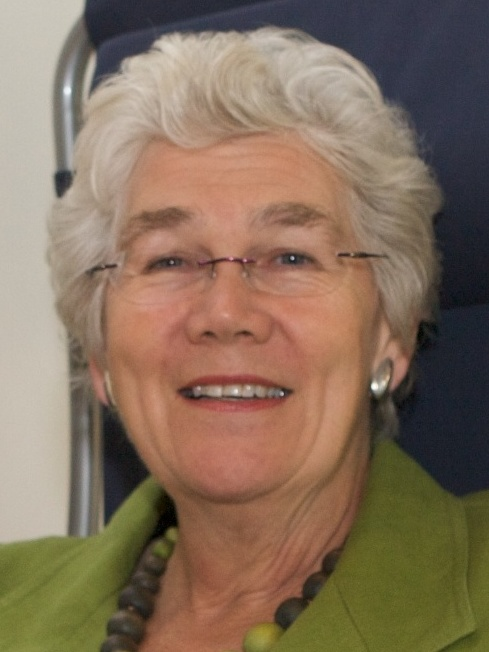

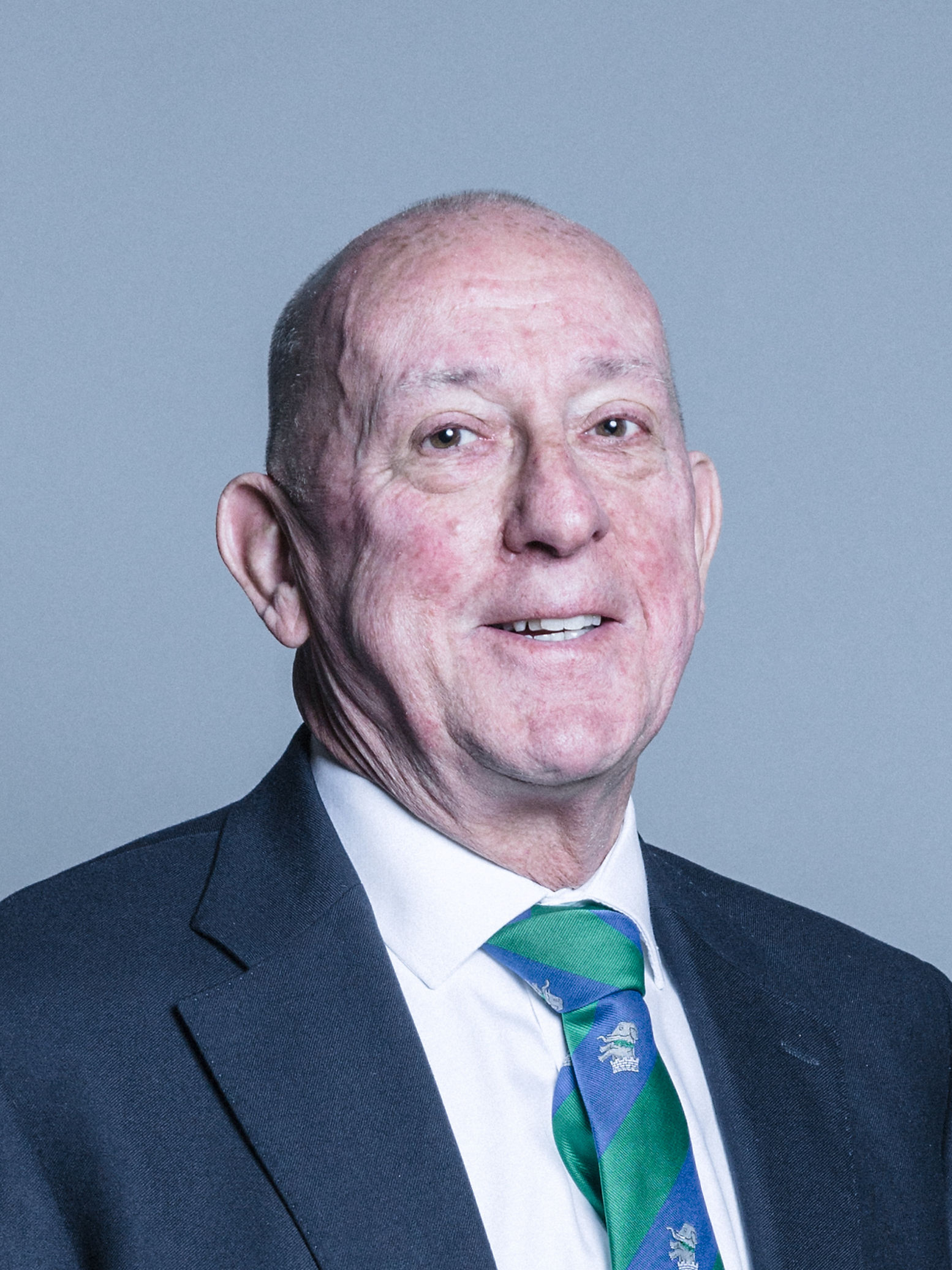
| | First party | Second party |
|---|---|---|
| Candidate | Diana Maddock | Robert Hayward |
| Party | Liberal Democrats | Conservative |
| Popular vote | 33,164 | 16,737 |
| Percentage | 62.2% | 31.4% |
| Swing | ▲38.6% | ▼32.2% |
MP before election
Robert Adley
Conservative
Elected MP
Diana Maddock
Liberal Democrats

A by-election was held in the British House of Commons constituency of Christchurch on 29 July 1993 following the death of sitting Conservative MP Robert Adley.

The result was a gain for the Liberal Democrats, notable for the swing necessary to take such a strong Conservative seat, gaining more than 60% of the votes cast and winning practically twice as many votes as the Conservatives. As of December 2021, the swing of 35.4% remains the sixth-largest by-election swing in British political history (the Bermondsey by-election in 1983 having the largest). It was also the largest swing (35%) against any British government since 1918.

At the time, it was not necessary for candidates in British elections to register party names or ballot paper descriptions. Details on candidates at this election are taken from the official count and David Boothroyd's election results site.

== Result ==
Christchurch 1993 by-election
| Party | Candidate | Votes | % | ±% |
|---|---|---|---|---|
| Liberal Democrats | Diana Maddock | 33,164 | 62.2 | +38.6 |
| Conservative | Robert Hayward | 16,737 | 31.4 | –32.2 |
| Labour | Nigel Lickley | 1,453 | 2.7 | –9.4 |
| Anti-Federalist League | Alan Sked | 878 | 1.6 | New |
| Monster Raving Loony | David Sutch | 404 | 0.8 | New |
| Ind. Conservative | Andrew Bannon | 357 | 0.7 | New |
| Sack Graham Taylor | Peter Newman | 80 | 0.2 | New |
| Buy the Daily Sport | Tara Bardot-Jackson | 67 | 0.1 | New |
| Save the National Health Service | Peter A. Hollyman | 60 | 0.1 | New |
| Highlander IV Wednesday Promotion | John Crockard | 48 | 0.1 | New |
| Natural Law | Mark Griffiths | 45 | 0.1 | –0.3 |
| Ian For King | Mark Belcher | 23 | 0.0 | New |
| Alfred The Chicken | Karl Fitzhugh | 18 | 0.0 | New |
| Rainbow Alliance | John Walley | 16 | 0.0 | New |
| Majority | | 16,427 | 30.8 | N/A |
| Turnout | | 53,350 | 74.2 | −6.5 |
| Liberal Democrats gain from Conservative | | Swing | +35.4 | |

== See also ==
- Lists of United Kingdom by-elections
- Christchurch (UK Parliament constituency)
