= John Hildesley =

English politician

John Hildesley (c. 1598 – 20 January 1681) was an English politician who sat in the House of Commons at various times between 1653 and 1660.

In 1653, Hildesley was nominated to represent Hampshire in the Barebones Parliament . He was elected Member of Parliament for Winchester in the First Protectorate Parliament, and was re-elected MP for Winchester in 1656 for the Second Protectorate Parliament and in 1659 for the Third Protectorate Parliament.

In 1660, Hildesley was elected Member of Parliament for Christchurch in the Convention Parliament.

Hildesley married Margaret Tulse, widow of Henry Tulse of Hinton Admiral. He was stepfather to Henry Tulse who was MP for Christchurch with him in 1660.

Parliament of England
Preceded by Richard Norton	Member of Parliament for Hampshire; 1653; With: Richard Norton; Richard Major	Succeeded by Richard Lord Cromwell; Robert Wallop; Richard Norton; Edward Hooper; Richard Major
Preceded by Not represented in Barebones Parliament	Member of Parliament for Winchester; 1654–1659; With: Nicholas Love 1659	Succeeded by Not represented in Restored Rump
