= Henry Tulse (died 1642) =

Henry Tulse (died 1642) was an English politician who sat in the House of Commons between 1640 and 1642.

Tulse was the son of William Tulse who acquired three manors near Christchurch in 1603. In 1640, Tulse leased Christchurch Parsonage from the Dean and Chapter of Winchester.

In April 1640, Tulse was elected member of parliament for Christchurch in the Short Parliament. He was re-elected MP for Christchurch for the Long Parliament in November 1640.

Tulse died before September 1642 when a writ was issued for an election to fill his seat.

Tulse lived at Hinton Admiral. He married Margaret and had a son Henry who was also MP for Christchurch. His widow subsequently married John Hildesley. His nephew Sir Henry Tulse became Lord Mayor of London.

Parliament of England
Vacant Parliament suspended since 1629	Member of Parliament for Christchurch; 1640–1642; With: Arnold Herbert 1640; Matthew Davis	Succeeded by Matthew Davis
