= 1918 Tullamore by-election =

UK Parliamentary by-election

The 1918 Tullamore by-election was held on 19 April 1918. The by-election was held due to the death of the incumbent Independent Nationalist MP, Edward John Graham. It was won by the Sinn Féin candidate Patrick McCartan, who stood unopposed.

McCartan had previously contested the by-election in South Armagh for Sinn Féin but lost out to the Irish Parliamentary Party candidate. He was subsequently elected for the merged King's County constituency in the 1918 general election.
