= Diana Maddock, Baroness Maddock =

British Liberal Democrat politician (1945–2020)

The Right Honourable The Baroness Maddock
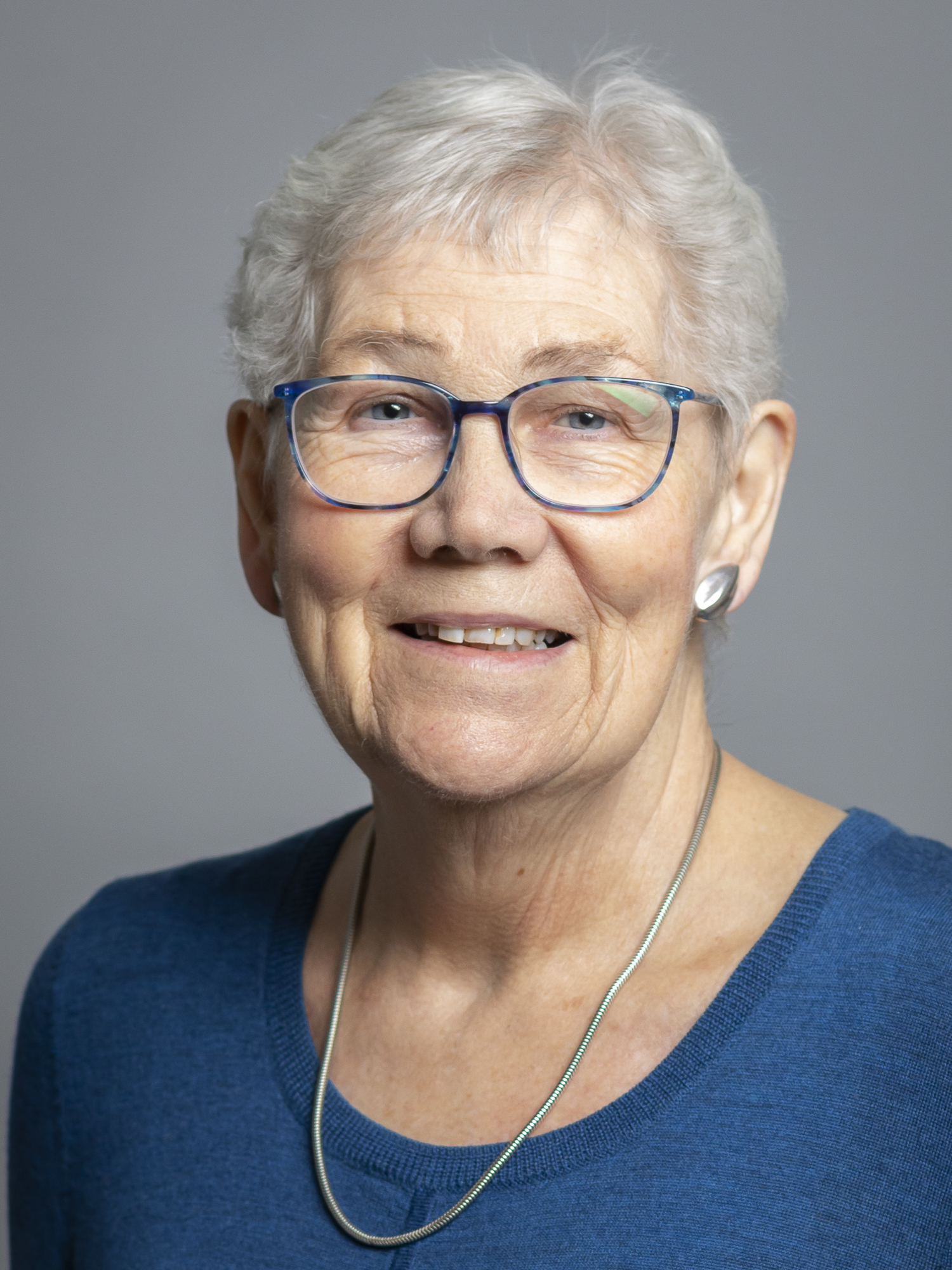
- Official portrait, 2018

President of the Liberal Democrats
- In office 1 January 1999 – 31 December 2000
- Preceded by: Robert Maclennan
- Succeeded by: Navnit Dholakia

Member of the House of Lords
- Lord Temporal
- Life peerage 30 October 1997 – 26 June 2020

Member of Parliament for Christchurch
- In office 29 July 1993 – 8 April 1997
- Preceded by: Robert Adley
- Succeeded by: Christopher Chope

Personal details
- Born: Diana Margaret Pearson Derbyshire; 19 May 1945 Croydon, Surrey, England
- Died: 26 June 2020 (aged 75) Berwick-upon-Tweed, Northumberland, England
- Party: Liberal Democrats (from 1988)
- Other political affiliations: Liberal (1976–1988)
- Spouses: Bob Maddock (m. 1966; div. 2000) The Lord Beith (m. 2001)
- Children: 2
- Education: Portsmouth University

Diana Margaret Pearson Maddock, Baroness Maddock (née Derbyshire; 19 May 1945 – 26 June 2020) was a British politician who served as Member of Parliament (MP) for Christchurch from 1993 to 1997. A member of the Liberal Democrats, she re-entered Parliament as a life peer as Baroness Maddock, of Christchurch in the County of Dorset, in 1997 where she remained until her death.

== Early life and early career ==
Diana Margaret Pearson Derbyshire was born in Croydon on 19 May 1945, to Margaret (Evans) and Reginald Derbyshire. She spent her early years in Croydon and Wantage, but after her parents divorced, she was raised by her mother in Lymington, in Hampshire.

She was educated at Brockenhurst Grammar School, Shenstone Training College, and Portsmouth Polytechnic (now the University of Portsmouth) and was a teacher of English as a foreign language. She married Bob Maddock in 1966. The couple lived in Sweden for a time, and she credited her time living there as an influence on her political beliefs and went on to serve as President of the Anglo-Swedish Society from 1999 until her death. They returned to England in 1972, and had two daughters.

== Political career ==
Maddock joined the Liberal Party in 1976, and was elected to Southampton City Council in 1984. Maddock was not particularly political in her early life. She highlights her initial involvement came when she was pregnant and approached by a canvasser who convinced her to join the Liberal Party having voted for them previously. As she had stopped work, she had more time to be civically engaged which expanded to the point where she became involved with the Association of Liberal Councillors which promoted active engagement with community groups and she realised she enjoyed campaigning. She became leader of the Liberal Democrat group on the council in 1986. While on Southampton City Council Maddock's primary areas of interest were housing and energy conservation, and she continued her work in these areas throughout her political career.

Maddock unsuccessfully contested Southampton Test at the 1992 general election, coming third. She was elected as Member of Parliament for Christchurch at a by-election in 1993 that was caused by the death of Robert Adley, but lost the seat at the 1997 election to the Conservative candidate Christopher Chope. During her time in parliament, she was the Liberal Democrat spokesperson for housing.

She was created a life peer as Baroness Maddock, of Christchurch in the County of Dorset on 30 October 1997. From 1998 to 2000, she was President of the Liberal Democrats.

In 2005, she was elected a member of Northumberland County Council for Berwick North Division and in 2007 also to Berwick-upon-Tweed Borough Council for Edward Ward.

Maddock did not re-stand for election to the County Council at the expiry of her term in 2008 and the Borough Council was abolished in 2009 and absorbed into Northumberland County Council.

== Later life ==
Her marriage to Bob Maddock ended in divorce in 2000. She married secondly, to Alan Beith, then-MP for Berwick-upon-Tweed, in 2001. She and her husband were one of the few couples who each held peerages in their own right. Lady Beith died from breast cancer on 26 June 2020, aged 75, at her home in Berwick-upon Tweed, Northumberland.

Parliament of the United Kingdom
Preceded by Robert Adley	Member of Parliament for Christchurch; 1993–1997	Succeeded by Christopher Chope
Party political offices
Preceded by Robert Maclennan	President of the Liberal Democrats; 1998–2000	Succeeded by Navnit Dholakia
