= John Walters (Royal Navy officer) =

British flag officer (1926–2008)

Rear-Admiral John Walters CB
- Born: 23 April 1926; Guildford, Surrey
- Died: 7 May 2008 (aged 82); Liphook, Hampshire
- Military career
- Allegiance: United Kingdom
- Branch: Royal Navy
- Service years: 1944-1984
- Rank: Rear-Admiral
- Commands: Chief Naval Judge Advocate; Assistant Chief of Defence Staff (Personnel and Logistics)
- Conflicts: Second World War; Chinese Civil War; Falklands War
- Awards: Companion of the Order of the Bath

Rear-Admiral John William Townshend Walters CB (23 April 1926 – 7 May 2008) was a Royal Navy flag officer and naval judge who served as Chief Naval Judge Advocate and Assistant Chief of Defence Staff (Personnel and Logistics).

== Early life and family ==
John William Townshend Walters was born on 23 April 1926 in Guildford, Surrey to William Bernard Townshend Walters, a Crown Agent, and Lilian Martha Hartridge. He was educated at The John Fisher School in Purley, followed by Britannia Royal Naval College Dartmouth during its wartime relocation to Eaton Hall, Cheshire.

== Naval career ==
Walters graduated from Dartmouth in 1944 and served as a junior officer on HMS King George V during the Second World War, being present at the Surrender of Japan. Between 1946 and 1949, Walters served on HMS London, and in 1949 saw action in the Chinese Civil War as part of London's intervention in the HMS Amethyst Incident, during which 13 sailors were killed.

Between 1951 and 1953, Walters served on the staff of Lord Mountbatten in Malta. In 1956, he was called to the bar at Middle Temple. His legal career culminated in his service as Chief Naval Judge Advocate between 1972 and 1975.

Walters presided as Judge Advocate over the most recent mutiny trial in the Royal Navy, involving a group of sailors aboard HMS Iveston refusing duty and striking a petty officer in 1970. Five of the crew were tried by court martial at Rosyth and convicted

Between 1980 and 1981, Walters was part of the British delegation to the United Nations Convention on the Law of the Sea. This was followed by his appointment the same year as Assistant Chief of Defence Staff (personnel and logistics), where he played a key role in the Falklands War by orchestrating the requisition of the ocean liner Queen Elizabeth 2. Walters retired from the Royal Navy in 1984, and was appointed CB the same year.

== Retirement ==
After retirement, Walters served as chairman on industrial tribunals in the Brighton, Reading and Southampton circuits. He died on 7 May 2008 in Liphook, Hampshire.
