= Charles Young (Conservative politician) =

English educationalist and politician

Charles Edward Baring Young (19 March 1850 – 22 September 1928) was an English educationalist and Conservative politician.

Young was born at Paddington, the son of Charles Baring Young and his wife Elizabeth Winthrop. He was educated at Eton and Trinity College, Cambridge. He was later called to the bar at Inner Temple. On the death of his father in 1882, he inherited an estate at Monkenfrith, East Barnet.

Young had strong Christian principles and was inspired to help underprivileged and orphan children from London. In September 1883, he purchased the Daylesford and Kingham Hill estates in Oxfordshire in order to establish Kingham Hill School for boys. Many years later, it became a mixed school. The estates comprised 1,547 acres (6.26 km^{2}) between the River Evenlode in Oddington, Oxfordshire and Churchill, Oxfordshire.

Young was elected Member of Parliament (MP) for Christchurch, Hampshire in November 1885. He held the seat until 1892 when he resigned to concentrate his efforts on Kingham Hill School. Young also purchased a farm at Woodstock, Ontario where he provided an opportunity for many of his Kingham Hill boys to find a life in Canada. Upon his death in 1928, his Monkenfrith estate was donated for the foundation of Oak Hill College.

== Sources ==
- Leigh Rayment's Historical List of MPs

Parliament of the United Kingdom
Preceded by Horace Davey	Member of Parliament for Christchurch; 1885–1892	Succeeded by Abel Henry Smith
