= Edward Harris (Royal Navy officer) =

Royal Navy Admiral, diplomat and politician (1808–1888)

Admiral Sir Edward Alfred John Harris KCB (20 May 1808 – 17 July 1888) was a British naval commander, diplomat and politician.

== Background ==
Harris was the second son of James Harris, 2nd Earl of Malmesbury, by Harriet Susan, daughter of Francis Bateman Dashwood. James Harris, 3rd Earl of Malmesbury, was his elder brother.

== Career ==
Harris was an admiral in the Royal Navy. He also sat as Member of Parliament for Christchurch between 1844 and 1852 and served as Minister Plenipotentiary to the Swiss Confederation between 1858 and 1867 and as Envoy Extraordinary and Minister Plenipotentiary to the Netherlands between 1867 and 1877. He was appointed a Companion of the Order of the Bath in 1863 and a Knight Commander of the Order of the Bath in 1872. He was also a deputy lieutenant for Hampshire.

== Family ==
Harris married in 1841 Emma Chambers, the daughter of Captain Samuel Chambers and Susan Mathilda Wylly. They had several children, who were raised to the rank of an Earl′s child in 1890, after the eldest son succeeded as Earl of Malmesbury:

- Edward James Harris (12 April 1842 – 19 May 1899), who succeeded his uncle as Earl of Malmesbury
- Alfred James Harris (16 Nov 1843 – 25 Jul 1877), a lieutenant in the Royal Navy; died unmarried.
- Rose Matilda Harris (d. 2 Nov 1881); who married in 1878 Francis Henry Carew, and left issue.
- Constance Catherine Harris (b. c 1847)
- Hon. John William Harris (21 Feb 1849 – 17 Feb 1932), a diplomat; sho married in 1880 Amelia Frances Wardlaw Cumming (d. 1926), daughter of Lieut.-Colonel Henry Wedderburn Cumming.
- Lady Blanche Harriet Emma Harris (1850 – 13 April 1911); who married in 1877 Captain Francis Henry James Baillie (d. 1879), son of Rt. Hon. Colonel Henry James Baillie, and left issue.
- Lady Florence Lucia Harris (1854 – 27 Jan 1909); who married in 1890 Sir Charles Grant, KCSI (1836–1903), son of Sir Robert Grant (MP), and left issue.
- Lady Alice Mary Harris (1857 – 6 April 1940); who married in St George's, Hanover Square on 7 April 1900 Colonel Henry Robert Eyre.

He died in July 1888, aged 80. Lady Harris died in July 1896.

== See also ==
- O'Byrne, William Richard (1849). "Harris, Edward Alfred John" . A Naval Biographical Dictionary . John Murray – via Wikisource.

Parliament of the United Kingdom
Preceded by Sir George Henry Rose	Member of Parliament for Christchurch; 1844–1852	Succeeded by John Edward Walcott
Diplomatic posts
Preceded by George John Robert Gordon	Minister Plenipotentiary to the Swiss Confederation; 1858–1867	Succeeded by John Lumley-Savile
Preceded by Sir John Huskisson, Bt	Envoy Extraordinary and Minister Plenipotentiary to the Netherlands; 1867–1877	Succeeded by Hon. William Stuart
