= 1844 Christchurch by-election =

UK parliamentary by-election

The 1844 Christchurch by-election was a parliamentary by-election for the UK House of Commons constituency of Christchurch, Hampshire, England held on 28 March 1844. The seat was held after being won by Conservative Edward Harris.

== Result ==
By-election, 28 March 1844: Christchurch
Party	Candidate	Votes	%	±%
Conservative	Edward Harris	180	68.2	N/A
Whig	William Tice	84	31.8	New
Majority		96	36.4	N/A
Turnout		264	79.8	N/A
Registered electors		331		
Conservative hold		Swing	N/A	
