= Mackenzie Walcott =

English clergyman (1821–1880)

Mackenzie Edward Charles Walcott (1821–1880) was an English clergyman, known as an ecclesiologist and antiquarian.

== Life ==
Born at Walcot, Bath on 15 December 1821, he was the only son of Admiral John Edward Walcott (1790–1868), M.P. for Christchurch in the four parliaments from 1859 to 1868. His mother was Charlotte Anne (1796–1863), daughter of Colonel John Nelley. Entered at Winchester College in 1837, Walcott matriculated at Exeter College, Oxford, on 18 June 1840. He graduated B.A. on 25 May 1844, taking a third class in classics, and proceeded M.A. in 1847 and B.D. in 1866.

Walcott was ordained deacon in 1844 and priest in 1845. His first curacy was at Enfield, Middlesex (1845–7); he was then curate of St Margaret's, Westminster, from 1847 to 1850, and of St James's, Westminster, from 1850 to 1853. In 1861 he was domestic chaplain to his relative, Lord Lyons, and assistant minister of Berkeley Chapel, Mayfair, London; and from 1867 to 1870 he held the post of minister at the chapel.

In 1863 Walcott was appointed precentor (with the prebend of Oving) of Chichester Cathedral, and held that preferment until his death. Always at work on antiquarian and ecclesiological subjects, he was elected Fellow of the Society of Antiquaries of London on 10 January 1861.

He died on 22 December 1880 at 58 Belgrave Road, London, and was buried in Brompton cemetery.

== Works ==
Walcott contributed articles to periodicals and to the transactions of learned societies, and he was one of the oldest contributors to Notes and Queries His separate works include:

- Parish Church of St. Margaret, Westminster, 1847.
- Handbook for Parish of St. James, Westminster, 1850.
- Westminster, Memorials of the City, 1849; new ed. 1851.
- The English Ordinal: its History, Validity, and Catholicity, 1851.
- St. Paul at Athens: a Sacred Poem, 1851.
- William of Wykeham and his Colleges, 1852.
- Handbook for Winchester Cathedral, 1854.
- Dedication of the Temple: a Sacred Poem, 1854.
- The Death of Jacob: a Sacred Poem, 1857.
- The English Episcopate: Biographical Memoirs, 5 parts, 1858.
- Glossary of Words in the Cumbrian Dialect 1868
- Guide to the Cathedrals of England and Wales, 1858; new ed. enlarged, 1860; the descriptions of the cathedrals were also published in separate parts.
- Guide to the South Coast of England, 1859.
- Guide to the Mountains, Lakes, and North-West Coast of England, 1860.
- Guide to the East Coast of England, 1861; parts of these works were issued separately.
- Minsters and Abbey Ruins of the United Kingdom, 1860.
- Church and Conventual Arrangement, 1861.
- Priory Church of Christchurch, Twyneham, 1862.
- The Double Choir historically and practically considered, 1864.
- Interior of a Gothic Minster, 1864.
- Precinct of a Gothic Minster, 1865.
- Cathedralia: a Constitutional History of Cathedrals of the Western Church, 1865.
- Battle Abbey, 1866; 2nd ed. 1867.
- Memorials of Stamford, 1867.
- Sacred Archæology: a Popular Dictionary, 1868.
- Leaflets [poems], by M. E. C. W., 1872.
- Traditions and Customs of Cathedrals, 1872; 2nd ed. revised and enlarged, 1872.
- Scoti-Monasticon, the Ancient Church of Scotland, 1874.
- Constitutions and Canons Ecclesiastical of the Church of England, 1874.
- The Four Minsters round the Wrekin, 1877.
- Early Statutes of the Cathedral Church of Chichester, 1877.
- Church Work and Life in English Minsters, 1879.

Walcott contributed to Henry Thompson's collection of Original Ballads, 1850, and to the Rev. Orby Shipley's Church and the World, 1866. He edited in 1865, with additions and notes, Thomas Plume's Account of Bishop Hacket, and published, with William Archibald Scott Robertson in 1872 and 1874, two parts of Parish Church Goods in Kent. Many of his papers on the inventories and registers of ecclesiastical foundations were also issued separately, and he presented manuscripts to the British Museum.

== Family ==
On 20 July 1852, at St. James's Church, Piccadilly, he married Roseanne Elizabeth, second daughter of Major Frederick Brownlow and niece of Charles Brownlow, 1st Baron Lurgan. He left no issue.

== Notes ==
Attribution

This article incorporates text from a publication now in the public domain: Lee, Sidney, ed. (1899). "Walcott, Mackenzie Edward Charles". Dictionary of National Biography. Vol. 59. London: Smith, Elder & Co.
