= Ronald Edmond Balfour =

British historian and British Army Major

Major Ronald Edmond Balfour (1904 – 10 March 1945) was a British medieval historian and a fellow of King's College, Cambridge. In the British Army, Major Balfour served as a Monument Man and was killed by enemy shelling near Cleves, Germany, in the closing months of the war.

== Early life ==
Ronald Edmond Balfour was born to Lieutenant-Colonel Kenneth Robert Balfour, and May Eleanor Balfour (née Broadwood), of Marlow, Buckinghamshire. Balfour was educated at Eton and King's College, Cambridge, matriculating in 1922. As a specialist in medieval history, he was elected a Fellow of King's College in 1928 and Lecturer in History in 1930. He notably amassed a personal library of over 8,000 volumes by the beginning of the war, which was donated to Cambridge after his death.

== War service ==
Gravestone, Ronald Edmond Balfou, Reichswald Forest War Cemetery, 2026.

Ronald Edmond Balfou, Reichswald Forest War Cemetery, 2026.

At the outbreak of the Second World War in 1939, Balfour took an administrative post with the French section of the Ministry of Information. Less than a year later, he commissioned in the King's Royal Rifle Corps of the British Army as Second Lieutenant. After his promotion to captain, he worked in Winchester and York interviewing recruits.

Balfour was recruited by Geoffrey Webb, Slade Professor of Fine Art at Cambridge University and newly installed Head of the Monuments, Fine Arts and Archives section (MFAA) of the Supreme Headquarters Allied Expeditionary Force to preserve the cultural heritage of Europe.

By the end of May 1944, Balfour had been assigned as a Monuments Man with the 21st Army Group under General Sir Bernard Montgomery, which was initially composed of the First U.S. Army and the British Second Army. Although not part of the Normandy landings, a now Major Balfour was detached with the First Canadian Army and arrived in the chaotic wake of the invasion in August 1944.

He made his first report on 9 September, from the city of Rouen. The city had sustained massive damage over the war from both German and Allied bombing, as well as the destructive retreat by the German Army. He accompanied his unit through Belgium, but expressed dismay at the delays and difficulties in reaching important sites. Balfour was injured in a traffic accident shortly after his unit moved into Holland. He managed to avoid being shipped home from the conflict zone and recovered for two months in a Brussels hospital.

Balfour returned to action in February 1945, as the Allies were making their final push through the Lower Rheinland. At Goch, Balfour convinced his Canadian superiors not to destroy the city's 14th-Century entry gates.

He filed his last report on 3 March, where he described his work in the church in Cleves (Kleve): “Fragments of two large 16th-century retables of carved and painted wood have been collected and removed to safety. Parish archives found in a blasted safe and strewn over the floor of the wrecked sacristy have also been removed for safekeeping.” That same day he also wrote to Geoffrey Webb: "...my storage place in Cleves wouldn’t be exactly approved of by Washington as it’s an attic in a building occupied by troops and refugees. The house is without proper protection and shells fall ceaselessly in the neighbourhood but it’s the only building in the town that still has a roof, doors and windows."

On 10 March 1945, Major Balfour and a group of German citizens were on a road transporting the church altarpiece from Christ the King Church in a suburb of Cleves, to safety in nearby Goch. Balfour was on one side of the road, while his companions and the handcart carrying the church's precious objects were on the other, when a German shell struck near the group. The citizens and altarpiece were unharmed, but Balfour was killed.

Lt. Col. Sir Leonard Woolley, Adviser to the War Office on Monuments, Fine Arts and Archives, wrote upon his death: "It is a great and unexpected blow...He had done wonderfully good work, as those who knew him knew he would do. He leaves a gap in our service, which no one will be able to fill so well. The whole field of art history has suffered a tragic loss."

He is buried in Reichswald Forest War Cemetery, near Cleves.

== Legacy ==
He bequeathed his personal library of 8,000 books to be divided between the Cambridge University Library and the King's College Library.

In 1954, civic leaders in Cleve installed a plaque at the city archives building along with a photo of Balfour to honor his legacy. It reads: “Major Ronald E. Balfour, Lector in King’s College of the University of Cambridge, died in action March 1945 near Kloster Spyck. This gentleman saved as British Monuments Officer precious medieval archives and items of lower Rhine towns. Honor to his memory.” German newspapers also acknowledged Balfour's contribution to saving German cultural heritage: “With his own hands Balfour salvaged from amidst the rubble of destroyed buildings the archives of several towns, including those of Goch, Kleve, Cranenburg and Xanten.”

In the 2014 film The Monuments Men, he is loosely represented by fictional British officer "Donald Jeffries", played by Hugh Bonneville.
