= Edward John Graham =

Irish politician, died 1918

Edward John Graham (14 July 1866 – 24 March 1918) was an Irish nationalist politician and Member of Parliament (MP) in the House of Commons of the United Kingdom of Great Britain and Ireland.

He was elected as an Independent Nationalist MP at the December 1914 Tullamore by-election, following the death of the incumbent Irish Parliamentary Party MP, Edmund Haviland-Burke. He died in office in March 1918 and the by-election for his seat was won by the Sinn Féin candidate Patrick McCartan, who stood unopposed.

Parliament of the United Kingdom
Preceded by Edmund Haviland-Burke	Member of Parliament for Tullamore; 1914–1918	Succeeded by Patrick McCartan
