= Joseph Francis Fox =

Joseph Francis Fox (1853–1903) was an Irish nationalist politician and member of parliament (MP) in the House of Commons of the United Kingdom of Great Britain and Ireland.

== Biography ==
Fox was elected as an Irish Parliamentary Party MP for the Tullamore constituency at the 1885 general election, and re-elected at the 1886 general election.

At the 1892 general election, he was returned unopposed as an Irish National Federation (Anti-Parnellite) MP, and re-elected at the 1895 general election. He did not contest the 1900 general election. Professionally, he was a surgeon and physician.

Parliament of the United Kingdom
New constituency	Member of Parliament for Tullamore; 1885 – 1900	Succeeded by Edmund Haviland-Burke
