= Christchurch and Lymington =

UK Parliament constituency (1974–1983)

- Former constituency for the House of Commons
- Christchurch and Lymington in Hampshire, showing boundaries used from 1974–1983
- County: Hampshire

February 1974–1983
- Seats: One
- Created from: Bournemouth East and Christchurch
- Replaced by: New Forest and Christchurch

Christchurch and Lymington was a parliamentary constituency centred on the towns of Christchurch and Lymington in Hampshire. It returned one Member of Parliament (MP) to the House of Commons of the Parliament of the United Kingdom.

The constituency was created for the February 1974 general election, and abolished for the 1983 general election, when it was largely replaced by the new Christchurch constituency.

== Boundaries ==
The Boroughs of Christchurch and Lymington.

== Members of Parliament ==
Election	Member	Party
Feb 1974	Robert Adley	Conservative
1983	constituency abolished	

== Elections results ==
=== Elections in the 1970s ===
General election February 1974: Christchurch and Lymington
Party	Candidate	Votes	%	±%
Conservative	Robert James Adley	25,908	58.02	
Liberal	Martin John Kyrle	11,274	25.25	
Labour	Bruce Stanley Reed	7,471	16.73	
Majority		14,634	32.77	
Turnout		44,653	81.22	
Conservative win (new seat)				

General election October 1974: Christchurch and Lymington
Party	Candidate	Votes	%	±%
Conservative	Robert James Adley	23,728	57.42	−0.60
Liberal	John Madeley	9,838	23.81	−1.44
Labour	L.K. Hatts	7,759	18.78	+2.05
Majority		13,890	33.61	+0.84
Turnout		41,325	74.73	−6.49
Conservative hold		Swing	+0.42	

General election 1979: Christchurch and Lymington
Party	Candidate	Votes	%	±%
Conservative	Robert James Adley	29,817	66.01	+8.69
Liberal	Robert Harrison	7,654	16.95	−6.86
Labour	L.K. Hatts	6,722	14.88	−3.90
Ecology	James Keeling	975	2.16	new
Majority		22,163	49.06	+15.55
Turnout		45,168	77.63	+2.90
Conservative hold		Swing	+7.77	
