= 1914 Tullamore by-election =

UK Parliamentary by-election

The 1914 Tullamore by-election was held on 8 December 1914. The by-election was held due to the death of the incumbent Irish Parliamentary MP, Edmund Haviland-Burke. It was won by the Independent Nationalist candidate Edward John Graham.

== Result ==
Tullamore by-election, 8 December 1914
| Party | Candidate | Votes | % | ±% |
|---|---|---|---|---|
| Ind. Nationalist | Edward John Graham | 1,667 | 51.2 | New |
| Irish Parliamentary | Patrick F. Adams | 1,588 | 48.8 | N/A |
| Majority | | 79 | 2.4 | N/A |
| Turnout | | 3,255 | 71.6 | N/A |
| Ind. Nationalist gain from Irish Parliamentary | | Swing | N/A | |
