= Kenneth Balfour =

British politician

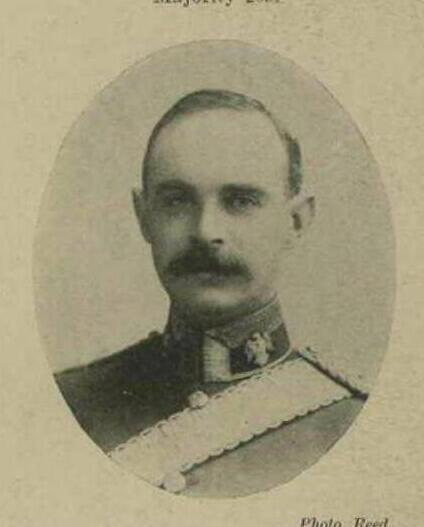
- Born: 14 December 1863
- Died: 7 September 1936
- Occupation: Politician
- Spouse(s): Margaret Anne Rogerson, May Eleanor Broadwood
- Children: 6, including Ronald Edmond Balfour

Lieutenant-Colonel Kenneth Robert Balfour (14 December 1863 – 7 September 1936) was a British Conservative Party politician.

== Background and personal life ==
Balfour purchased Brownsea Island in Poole Harbour in 1891. Following the introduction of electric lighting, the castle was gutted by fire in 1896. It was later rebuilt – with modern fire hydrants – and in 1901 Balfour put the island up for sale.

== Military career ==
Balfour was commissioned in the 1st Dragoons, where he was appointed a lieutenant on 6 May 1885, and promoted captain on 1 August 1892. He was placed on the reserve list, and volunteered for service with the Imperial Yeomanry following the outbreak of the Second Boer War in late 1899. He was appointed second in command of the 11th battalion Imperial Yeomanry, with the temporary rank of major in the Army, on 10 February 1900, and left Liverpool for South Africa on the SS Cymric in March 1900.

He was later promoted to lieutenant-colonel.

== Political career ==
Balfour and Thomas Brassey (the Liberal candidate) stood for election as the Member of Parliament for Christchurch in the October 1900 general election.

At first Brassey seemed to have won by a slim majority of just 3 votes, but there were 11 spoiled votes which had not been marked properly by the presiding officers, 8 of them for Brassey and only 3 for Balfour, which reversed the result. Brassey alleged that there were electoral irregularities, although he stopped short of claiming corruption by Balfour, he did say that there were instances of impersonation and of voting by aliens. He lodged a court petition to overturn the result, but eventually withdrew the allegations.

The constituency of Christchurch at this time included the Borough of Bournemouth, which in 1901 expanded to include the parish of Winton, Dorset and Moordown. To avoid duplication of road names, some of the roads in the added parish had to be changed, and in commemoration of the resolution of the electoral dispute, an unnamed lane marking the boundary between Winton and Moordown became Balfour Road, and the adjoining Church Road became Brassey Road. Balfour remained MP for Christchurch until 1906.

Parliament of the United Kingdom
Preceded by Abel Henry Smith	Member of Parliament for Christchurch; 1900–1906	Succeeded by Arthur Acland Allen
