= Eric de la Torre =

British Army soldier

Luis Eric Rupert de la Torre, MBE (16 October 1918 – 22 August 2011) was a veteran of the St Nazaire Raid, a prison camp escapee, and the manager of a sports shop in north London.

Eric de la Torre was born in London to a Spanish father and Irish mother. He attended the John Fisher School in Croydon. In 1940 he was recruited to the accounts section of the Royal Army Ordnance Corps, but he sought and obtained a transfer to No. 3 Commando. He took part in a commando raid on Vågsøy, Norway (Operation Archery) on 27 December 1941, in the capacity of radio operator. He was captured by the Germans during the raid on the dock at the Breton town of St Nazaire (Operation Chariot) in 1942.

He made four escape attempts and was successful the last time. He was in Memmingen when the area was liberated by United States forces. He was awarded the MBE in 1997 and the Legion of Honour in 2006.
