= Edmund Haviland-Burke =

Irish politician

Edmund Haviland-Burke (1864 – 12 October 1914) was an Irish politician.

The son of Edmund Haviland-Burke, Member of Parliament for Christchurch, and a collateral descendant of Edmund Burke, Haviland-Burke was educated privately at various locations in Europe. He then joined the staff of the Manchester Guardian, for which he reported on the Greco-Turkish War.

Haviland-Burke was an Irish nationalist, and a supporter of Charles Stewart Parnell. Settling in Dublin, he stood unsuccessfully for the Irish National League in North Kerry at the 1892 general election, South Dublin in 1895, and North Louth at the 1900 general election. In that election, he also stood in Tullamore, where he finally took a seat. In Parliament, he served as a whip for the Irish Parliamentary Party. He held his seat in each subsequent election until his death in 1914.

In 1883, he married Susan Wilson, of Ballycastle, County Antrim.

He died at his residence at 70 Waterloo Road, Dublin, on 12 October 1914.

Parliament of the United Kingdom
Preceded by Joseph Francis Fox	Member of Parliament for Tullamore; 1900–1914	Succeeded by Edward John Graham
