= Abel Henry Smith =

British politician (1862-1930)

- Smith in 1895

Member of Parliament for Christchurch
- In office 1892–1900
- Preceded by: Charles Edward Baring Young
- Succeeded by: Kenneth Balfour

Member of Parliament for Hertford
- In office 1900–1910
- Preceded by: Evelyn Cecil
- Succeeded by: Sir John Rolleston

Personal details
- Born: 6 December 1862
- Died: 10 November 1930 (aged 67)
- Party: Conservative
- Parents: Abel Smith (father); Susan Emma Pelham (mother)
- Relatives: Henry Pelham (grandfather); Robert Brudenell (great-grandfather)
- Education: Eton College
- Occupation: Politician & land owner
- Military career
- Allegiance: United Kingdom
- Branch: British Army
- Service years: 1885-1918
- Rank: Colonel
- Unit: Hertfordshire Yeomanry
- Conflicts: World War I

Arms of Smith: Or, a chevron cotised sable between three demi-griffins couped of the last the two in chief respecting each other

Colonel Abel Henry Smith (6 December 1862 – 10 November 1930) was a British Conservative Party politician and an English landowner of the Smith banking family.

Smith was the son of Abel Smith (1829–98), from whom he inherited the large estate of Woodhall Park, near Watton-at-Stone in Hertfordshire.

== Political career ==
Over a dozen of his ancestors had sat in the House of Commons over the preceding century. At the 1892 general election, he was elected as Member of Parliament (MP) for Christchurch. He was re-elected in 1895, but at the 1900 general election he stood instead in the Hertford constituency which had been represented by his father until his death in 1898. He won the 1900 election, and held the seat until he stood down at the general election in January 1910. He was appointed a deputy lieutenant of Hertfordshire in August 1910.

== Military career ==
After serving as a sergeant in the Eton College Rifle Volunteers, in 1885 he was commissioned into the part-time Hertfordshire Yeomanry in which his father had served. He was promoted to captain in command of C Troop in 1889 and commanded B Squadron as a major from 1896 to 1901. He then served as second-in-command under the Earl of Essex. On 12 April 1913 he took over as commanding officer with the rank of lieutenant-colonel. He mobilised the regiment on the outbreak of World War I in August 1914, but was not passed fit for overseas service when the regiment embarked for Egypt. Instead he formed and trained the regiment's second line unit in East Anglia until 1916, when he was medically downgraded further and took over command of the regimental depot at Hertford until early 1917. He was appointed Honorary Colonel of the Hertfordshire Yeomanry on 26 September 1916, and remained joint Hon Colonel when it merged into the 86th (East Anglian) (Hertfordshire Yeomanry) Brigade, Royal Field Artillery, after the war.

After his death in 1930, aged 67, the contents of the family's stately home were dispersed, and the building rented out.

Parliament of the United Kingdom
Preceded by Charles Edward Baring Young	Member of Parliament for Christchurch; 1892–1900	Succeeded by Kenneth Robert Balfour
Preceded by Evelyn Cecil	Member of Parliament for Hertford; 1900 – January 1910	Succeeded by Sir John Rolleston
