= Sir John Ralph Milbanke Huskisson, 8th Baronet =

English diplomat, 1800–1868

Sir John Ralph Milbanke Huskisson, 8th Baronet (5 November 1800 – 30 December 1868) was a British diplomat.

He served at Frankfurt, St Petersburg, and Munich before serving as Envoy Extraordinary and Minister Plenipotentiary to the Netherlands from 1862 until 1867.

Coat of arms of Sir John Ralph Milbanke Huskisson, 8th Baronet
Crest A lion's head erased Gules charged with a bend Ermine. Escutcheon Gules a bend Ermine on a canton Or a lion's head erased of the first. Motto Resolute And Firm

== Notes ==
Diplomatic posts
Preceded by Sir Andrew Buchanan	Envoy Extraordinary and Minister Plenipotentiary to the Netherlands; 1862–1867	Succeeded by Sir Edward Alfred John Harris
Baronetage of England
Preceded by John Peniston Milbanke	Baronet (of Halnaby); 1850–1868	Succeeded by Peniston Milbanke
