= Kingham Hill School =

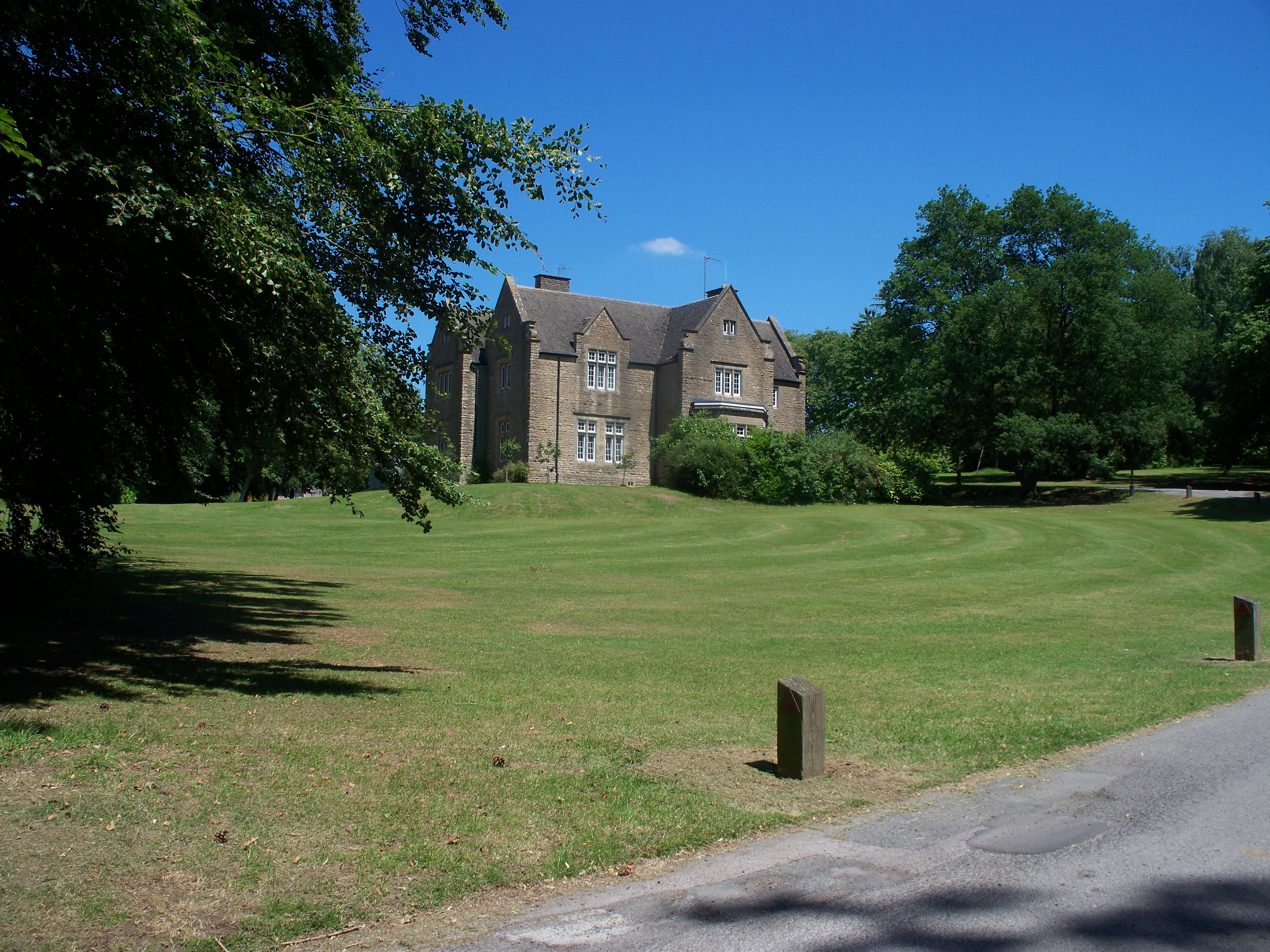

Location
- Kingham, Oxfordshire, OX7 6TH; England; 51°56′00″N 1°36′43″W

Information
- Type: Private school Boarding and Day school
- Motto: Verbum Dei Lucerna (God's Word is a Guiding Light)
- Religious affiliation: Church of England
- Established: 1886
- Founder: Charles Edward Baring Young
- Local authority: Oxfordshire
- Department for Education URN: 123277 Tables
- Head teacher: Peter Last
- Gender: Coeducational
- Age: 11 to 18
- Enrolment: 290
- Website: http://www.kinghamhill.org.uk

Dean Close Kingham Hill School is a Christian co-educational day and boarding school for children aged 11–18, located near the village of Kingham in Oxfordshire, England. The school was founded in 1886 by the philanthropist Charles Edward Baring Young, with buildings designed by the architect William Howard Seth-Smith. In 2025 the school joined the Dean Close Foundation.

== History ==
Kingham Hill was established by Charles Edward Baring Young to provide an education and vocational training to boys requiring boarding. In its early years, the school operated as a virtually self-sufficient community, with facilities including a farm, workshops, boarding houses, a chapel, and a sanatorium.

Young's educational vision combined academic instruction, practical skills training, and Christian teaching. The school maintained links with employment and settlement opportunities organised by Young, including in London as well as agricultural opportunities in Canada.

In 1992, the school became co-educational.

The school was administered by the Kingham Hill Trust until May 2025, when it announced that it would be joining the Dean Close Foundation.

== Structure and facilities ==
Kingham Hill educates approximately 290 pupils aged 11-18 and occupies a campus of 105 acres (43 hectares) in the heart of the Cotswold countryside. Pupils are organised into seven boarding houses and four day pupil houses.

The school's facilities include a theatre, science centre, sports centre, swimming pool, fitness suite, dance and drama studio, an all-weather sports pitch, squash courts, tennis courts and a farm with sheep, pigs, goats and chickens. Facilities are available for use by the local community at designated times.

The campus includes parkland, woodland and pasture. Recent developments have included a £6 million sports centre, opened in 2020, and a refurbishment of the sixth form centre.

== Houses ==
Boarding Houses:

- Plymouth - junior boys
- Norwich - senior boys
- Bradford - senior boys
- Sheffield - senior boys
- Greenwich - junior girls
- Durham - senior girls
- Severn - senior girls

Day Houses:

- Clyde - junior boys
- Havelock - senior boys
- Latimer - senior girls
- Woodstock - senior boys

== Notable alumni ==
- Andrew Adonis, Baron Adonis, journalist and former Labour politician, Secretary of State for Transport, 2009-2010
- Mark Alexander, artist
- Bruce Arnold, writer
- Guy Arnold traveller, writer
- Matthew Bourne, composer and jazz musician
- Phil Campion, author, former 22 Special Air Service
- Lance Ellington, singer on Strictly Come Dancing
- R. J. Ellory, award-winning crime writer
- Martin Glover (Youth), music producer, bassist and member of Killing Joke
- Terry Jones, graphic designer, art director, photographer, and founder of i-D magazine
- Alex Paterson of The Orb
- Guy Pratt, bassist for Pink Floyd and David Gilmour
