= John Edward Walcott =

Royal Navy Admiral and politician 1790–1868

Admiral John Edward Walcott
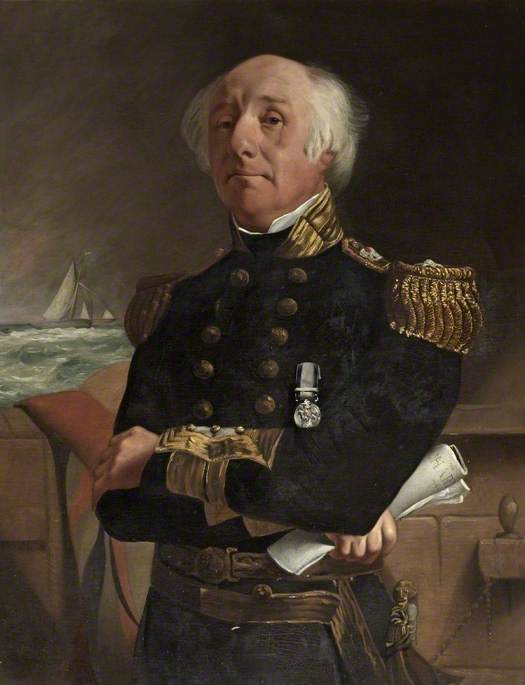
- John Edward Walcott, 1857 portrait
- Born: 1790
- Died: 1868 (aged 77–78)
- Relatives: Mackenzie Walcott (son)
- Military career
- Allegiance: United Kingdom
- Branch: Royal Navy
- Service years: 1802–1868
- Rank: Admiral
- Commands: HMS Carnation; HMS Tyne
- Conflicts: Napoleonic Wars; Action of 5 October 1804; Battle of Copenhagen

Admiral John Edward Walcott (1790–1868) was a British naval officer and politician.

== Life ==
He was born the third son of Edmond Walcott Sympson, of Winkton, Hampshire. He joined the Royal Navy in 1802 as a First Class volunteer on HMS Blenheim in which he sailed to the West Indies. In 1804, He then transferred to the newly commissioned HMS Lively, which in company with Medusa, Indefatigable and Amphion captured three Spanish bullion ships and sank a fourth in the action of 5 October 1804.

He then sailed under his friend Sir Samuel Hood on a number of different ships until Hood's death in 1814, taking part in the second Battle of Copenhagen in 1807. Promoted to signal-lieutenant on HMS Centaur in 1808 he was involved in the capture and burning of the 74-gun Russian ship Vsevolod off Rager Vik, the Russian naval base in Estonia.

In 1823, commanding HMS Tyne and in company with HMS Thracian, Walcott was sent in search of pirate ships off the coast of Cuba and discovered the Zaragozana, a notorious pirate schooner, which they captured after a gunfight, along with the survivors of the pirate crew. The latter were subsequently hanged.

He became a Member of Parliament for Christchurch in 1852.

He was advanced to the rank of Admiral on the Retired List on 1 May 1863.

== Family ==
Walcott married, in 1819, Charlotte Anne, daughter of Colonel John Nelley of the Bengal Artillery, and had a son, the clergyman Mackenzie Walcott, and two daughters.

== Sources ==
Parliament of the United Kingdom
Preceded by Edward Harris	Member of Parliament for Christchurch; 1852–1868	Succeeded by Edmund Haviland-Burke
