= Henry Tulse (Lord Mayor) =

English Public Administrator (17th Century)

- A Lord Mayor on Horseback, likely to be Henry Tulse, by John Closterman

Lord Mayor of London
- In office 1683–1684
- Preceded by: William Prichard
- Succeeded by: James Smyth

Personal details
- Children: Elizabeth Onslow

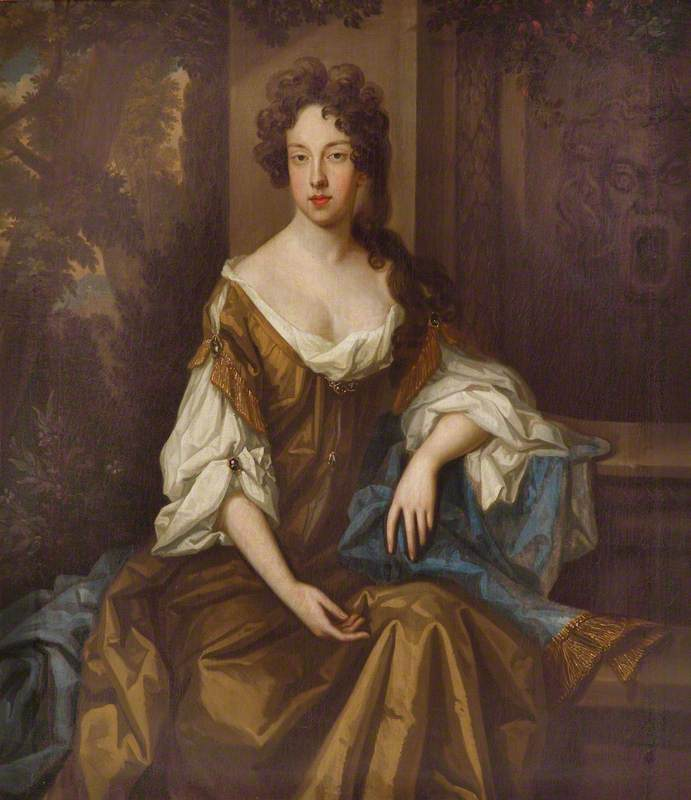
Henry Tulse's daughter Elizabeth (pictured) married Lord Onslow.

Sir Henry Tulse was an alderman of the City of London and was Lord Mayor of London in 1684.

== Biography ==
Tulse was elected alderman for Bread Street Ward in the City of London in 1673. He was knighted at the Guildhall on 18 October 1673. In 1674 he was Sheriff of London. He became Lord Mayor in 1684.

Tulse was involved in the west African slave trade. Notably he was a member of the Court of Assistants (equivalent in modern terms to a company director) of the Royal African Company, the most prolific institution of the entire Atlantic slave trade, from 1675 to 1677, 1680–82, and 1685–7, and served on its shipping committee. He held £500 of company stock (worth £81,000 in purchasing power at 2019 prices), which entitled him to one vote in the quorum at the court meeting.

The manors of Bodley, Upgrove and Scarletts, which formed part of the parish of Lambeth, were held by the Tulse family during the Commonwealth. These manors may at some stage have been held by Sir Henry, as there is evidence that portions of the manors were later held by two grandchildren of his daughter Elizabeth and her husband Richard Onslow, 1st Baron Onslow.

In March 2022 Lambeth London Borough Council initiated a consultation with residents as to renaming the area of Tulse Hill, to avoid a possible association with Tulse because of his membership of the Royal African Company.

Tulse was the cousin of Henry Tulse, MP for Christchurch after the Restoration.
