= King's County Tullamore =

Former parliamentary constituency in the United Kingdom

Tullamore
- Former county constituency for the House of Commons

1885–1918
- Seats: 1
- Created from: King's County and Portarlington
- Replaced by: King's County

Tullamore, a division of King's County, was a UK Parliament constituency in Ireland, that returned one Member of Parliament from 1885 to 1918.

Prior to the 1885 United Kingdom general election and after the dissolution of Parliament in 1918 the area was part of the King's County constituency.

== Boundaries ==
This constituency comprised the north-eastern part of King's County now known as County Offaly. It consisted of the baronies of Ballycowen, Coolestown, Geashill, Kilcoursey, Phillipstown Lower, Phillipstown Upper and Warrenstown.

== Members of Parliament ==
Election	Member	Party
1885	Joseph Francis Fox	Irish Parliamentary Party
1892	Joseph Francis Fox	Anti-Parnellite Nationalist
1900	Edmund Haviland-Burke	Irish Parliamentary Party
1914 by-election	Edward John Graham	Independent Nationalist
1918 by-election	Patrick McCartan	Sinn Féin
1918	Constituency merged into King's County	

== Elections ==
=== Elections in the 1880s ===
General election 4 December 1885: Tullamore
Party	Candidate	Votes	%	±%
Irish Parliamentary	Joseph Francis Fox	3,700	92.0	
Liberal	Walter Hussey Walsh	323	8.0	
Majority		3,377	84.0	
Turnout		4,023	77.9	
Registered electors		5,162		
Irish Parliamentary win (new seat)				

General election 3 July 1886: Tullamore
Party	Candidate	Votes	%	±%
Irish Parliamentary	Joseph Francis Fox	Unopposed		
Registered electors		5,162		
Irish Parliamentary hold				

=== Elections in the 1890s ===
General election 8 July 1892: Tullamore
Party	Candidate	Votes	%	±%
Irish National Federation	Joseph Francis Fox	Unopposed		
Registered electors		5,295		
Irish National Federation gain from Irish Parliamentary				

General election 15 July 1895: Tullamore
Party	Candidate	Votes	%	±%
Irish National Federation	Joseph Francis Fox	Unopposed		
Registered electors		5,081		
Irish National Federation hold				

=== Elections in the 1900s ===
General election 2 October 1900: Tullamore
Party	Candidate	Votes	%	±%
Irish Parliamentary	Edmund Haviland-Burke	Unopposed		
Registered electors		4,939		
Irish Parliamentary hold				

General election 16 January 1906: Tullamore
Party	Candidate	Votes	%	±%
Irish Parliamentary	Edmund Haviland-Burke	Unopposed		
Registered electors		4,605		
Irish Parliamentary hold				

=== Elections in the 1910s ===
General election 17 January 1910: Tullamore
Party	Candidate	Votes	%	±%
Irish Parliamentary	Edmund Haviland-Burke	Unopposed		
Registered electors		4,472		
Irish Parliamentary hold				

General election 5 December 1910: Tullamore
Party	Candidate	Votes	%	±%
Irish Parliamentary	Edmund Haviland-Burke	Unopposed		
Registered electors		4,472		
Irish Parliamentary hold				

By-election, 8 December 1914: Tullamore
Party	Candidate	Votes	%	±%
Ind. Nationalist	Edward John Graham	1,667	51.2	New
Irish Parliamentary	Patrick F. Adams	1,588	48.8	N/A
Majority		79	2.4	N/A
Turnout		3,255	71.6	N/A
Registered electors		4,547		
Ind. Nationalist gain from Irish Parliamentary		Swing	N/A	

By-election, 19 April 1918: Tullamore
Party	Candidate	Votes	%	±%
Sinn Féin	Patrick McCartan	Unopposed		
Registered electors		4,601		
Sinn Féin gain from Irish Parliamentary				
