= Paul Sackey =

England international rugby union player

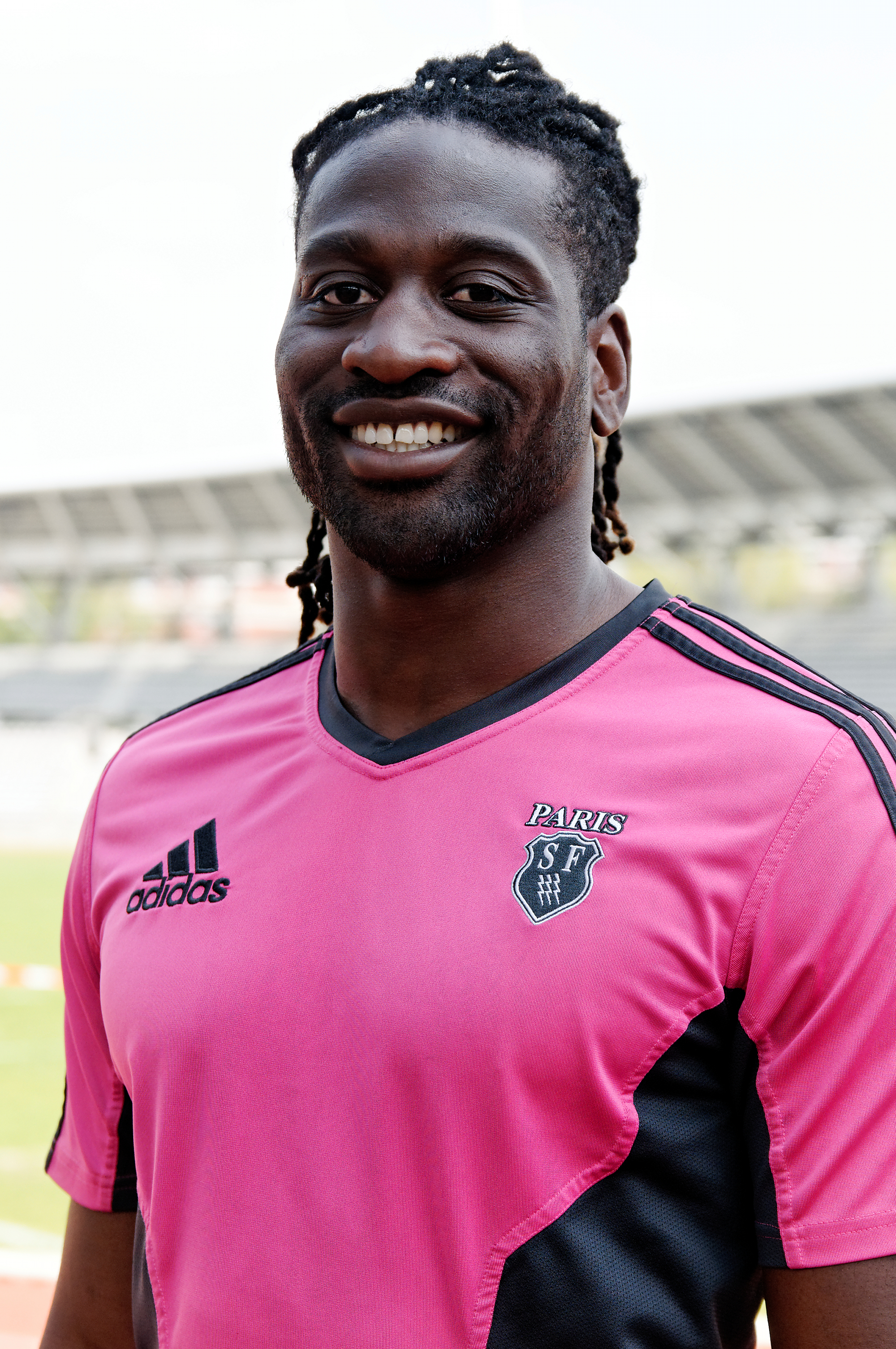
- Sackey in 2012
- Born: Paul Henry Sackey; 8 November 1979 (age 47) Lambeth, London, England
- Height: 1.86 m (6 ft 1 in)
- Weight: 92 kg (14 st 7 lb)
- School: The John Fisher School

Rugby union career
- Position: Wing
Youth career
- 1997–1998: Wasps Academy
Senior career
Years	Team	Apps	(Points)
1999–2000	Bedford Blues	20	(45)
2000–2005	London Irish	108	(190)
2005–2010	London Wasps	121	(215)
2010–2011	Toulon	20	(30)
2011–2013	Stade Français	41	(35)
2013–2014	Harlequins	10	(10)
- Correct as of 4 April 2014
International career
Years	Team	Apps	(Points)
2006–2009	England	22	(55)
National sevens team
Years	Team		Comps
2001	England		World Cup

Paul Henry Sackey (born 8 November 1979) is a retired English rugby union footballer who played on the wing, most recently for Harlequins in the Aviva Premiership.

He is an England international. He has also played for the England Saxons and the England Sevens team.

== Personal life ==
He is of Ghanaian heritage and attended the Roman Catholic John Fisher School in Purley.

== Early career ==
Born on 8 November 1979 in Lambeth, London, Sackey started playing rugby at 17, when he was a pupil at the Roman Catholic John Fisher School in Purley, and started out as a centre or fullback. His pace earned him an immediate call up to the school's 1st XV and he was a member of their Sevens team that won the Rosslyn Park Nationals Sevens tournament two years running.

Sackey was spotted by a Wasps scout, and went on to play for Wasps U19s and U21s. Andy Gomarsall took Sackey on a sevens trip to Lisbon and, realising his potential, arranged his move to Bedford. While at Bedford he was called up to the England under-21 squad that played in the under-21 World Cup in New Zealand, before signing professional forms with London Irish and joining them in August 2000. That year he also played for the England Sevens team in Argentina.

== Club career ==
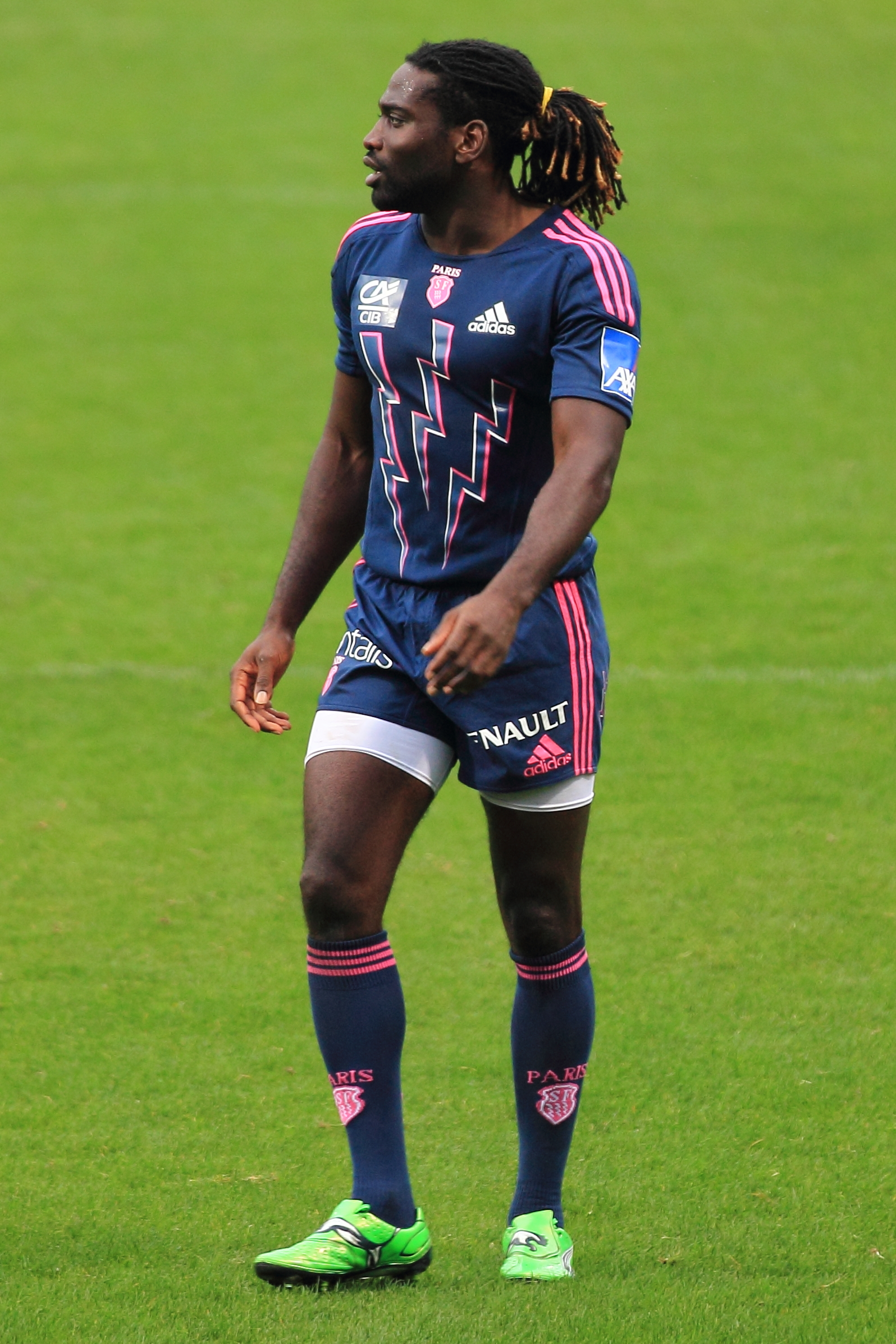
Sackey playing for Stade Français during a match against Stade toulousain, 2011

He topped the London Irish try scoring list in the 2000–01 Zurich Premiership, and in four years scored 43 tries in 121 Premiership appearances. He played for London Irish when they beat Northampton Saints 38–7 in the 2002 Powergen Cup final.

He left London Irish in February 2005 to return to Wasps and was immediately drafted into the 1st team squad, where he played on the wing in their victorious 2004–05 Zurich Premiership final against Leicester Tigers.

Sackey started against Leicester Tigers in the final of the 2006–07 Heineken Cup. Sackey won the League title for a second time during the 2007–08 Guinness Premiership.

In February 2010, Sackey, whose contract with Wasps expired at the end of the 2009–10 Guinness Premiership season, announced that he would join RC Toulonnais for the 2010–11 Top 14 season.

Sackey scored six tries in 20 matches for RC Toulonnais during the 2010–11 season. However, RC Toulonnais owner Mourad Boudjellal pronounced himself "unsatisfied" with Sackey's performance and he was released in May 2011. Sackey returned to England to play for Harlequins in the Aviva Premiership in the 2013/14 season.

== International career ==
In 2001 he was included in the Senior England tour party that played the United States and Canada. He scored twice in their 83–21 win over USA 'A' in Los Angeles.

In 2003, Sackey also played for the England Saxons against the Ireland Wolfhounds. He was a member of the England Saxons squad for the 2004 Churchill Cup that played Canada and the New Zealand Māori.

Sackey was named in a 30-man squad for the 2006 end of year rugby tests. After Mark Cueto pulled out through injury, Sackey was named in the starting line-up to face the All Blacks and made his England debut on Sunday 5 November 2006. His first try came a week later in England's 25–18 home defeat to Argentina. However, he was unable to build on his performances in these games after being forced out of the two subsequent games against South Africa and the 2007 Six Nations Championship through injury.

=== 2007 World Cup ===
Sackey was included in the training squad, and later (in August 2007) the final 30-man squad, for the 2007 Rugby World Cup.

In the group stage, he was notable for two tries in a 44–22 victory over Samoa, and two more in the final group match against Tonga, which secured England's place in the quarter-finals, where he impressed against Australia, managing to prevent a possible try. Sackey played in the 2007 Rugby World Cup Final. Sackey also played in the 2008 Six Nations Championship and performed well, scoring 3 tries.

Sackey was not in his best form during the 2009 Six Nations Championship; he was dropped after England's defeat to Wales and did not feature in the last three games of the tournament.

== Miscellaneous ==
=== Ambassador for Ghana Rugby ===
In July 2008, Sackey travelled to his parents' home country, Ghana, to gain a better understanding of the development of the sport there. A huge crowd of over 500 schoolchildren greeted him, with several games put on in his honour. These included an exhibition game between Kotababi and Unity primary schools. A number of children from the schools subsequently travelled to the United Kingdom in October 2008 to participate in a tournament arranged by charity Tour Aid.

=== Personal life ===
Sackey has two brothers, Eddie and Kojo, and two sisters, Beverley and Annabel. In 2006, Paul set up his own car-sourcing business, finding and selling top-of-the-range cars including, in one case, a £330,000 Reliant Robin.

In March 2023, Sackey was a part of SU Glovers' ultimately unsuccessful bid to purchase Yeovil Town Football Club.

He is now the Commercial Director at York City Football Club.
