= Christchurch (constituency) =

UK Parliament constituency (since 1983)

- County constituency for the House of Commons
- Interactive map of boundaries from 2024
- Boundary of Christchurch in South West England
- County: 1983–present: Dorset; 1572–1918: Hampshire
- Population: 83,596 (2011 census)
- Electorate: 71,598 (2023)
- Major settlements: Christchurch

Current constituency
- Created: 1983
- Member of Parliament: Christopher Chope (Conservative)
- Seats: One
- Created from: Christchurch and Lymington, North Dorset, New Forest

1572–1918
- Seats: 1572–1832: Two; 1832–1918: One
- Type of constituency: Borough constituency
- Replaced by: New Forest and Christchurch and Bournemouth

Christchurch is a constituency (Note: A county constituency (for the purposes of election expenses and type of returning officer)) in Dorset represented in the House of Commons of the UK Parliament since 1997 by Sir Christopher Chope of the Conservative Party. (Note: As with all constituencies, the constituency elects one Member of Parliament (MP) by the first past the post system of election at least every five years.)

== History ==
The original Christchurch constituency, a parliamentary borough, existed from 1572 until 1918. In 1918 the constituency was divided between New Forest and Christchurch and Bournemouth.

The constituency was re-created as a county constituency in 1983 from parts of the seats of Christchurch and Lymington, North Dorset and New Forest. It has since 1983 seen strong Conservative majorities, with the exception of a 1993 by-election caused by the death of Robert Adley when it was won by Diana Maddock, a Liberal Democrat. The Conservatives regained the seat at the next general election in 1997, despite their landslide defeat nationally and Chris Chope has retained it ever since. As of 2017, it is the second strongest Conservative seat in terms of voteshare (69.7%) and strongest in terms of majority (49.6%) in the country, although 2017 also saw Labour come second in the seat for the first time in history, having historically been far weaker than the Liberal Democrats and, in 2015, UKIP.

== Boundaries ==
1983–1997: The Borough of Christchurch, and the District of Wimborne wards of Ameysford, Ferndown Central, Golf Links, Longham, St Leonards and St Ives East, St Leonards and St Ives South, St Leonards and St Ives West, Stapehill, Tricketts Cross, Verwood, West Moors North, West Moors South, and West Parley.

1997–2010: The Borough of Christchurch, and the District of East Dorset wards of Ameysford, Ferndown Central, Golf Links, St Leonards and St Ives East, St Leonards and St Ives South, St Leonards and St Ives West, Tricketts Cross, Verwood, West Moors North, West Moors South, and West Parley.

2010–2024: The Borough of Christchurch, and the District of East Dorset wards of Ameysford, Ferndown Central, Ferndown Links, Longham, Parley, St Leonards and St Ives East, St Leonards and St Ives West, Stapehill, and West Moors.

2024–present: The District of Bournemouth, Christchurch and Poole wards of: Burton and Grange, Christchurch Town, Commons, Highcliffe and Walkford, Mudeford, Stanpit and West Highcliffe, and the Dorset wards of: Ferndown North, Ferndown South, St. Leonards & St. Ives, West Moors & Three Legged Cross, West Parley.

Minor changes following re-organisation of local authorities and wards in Dorset.

== Constituency profile ==
The area is not as rural as the adjoining New Forest constituencies, nor as urban as Bournemouth and Poole, and contains a mixed assortment of coastal retirement havens, outlying Bournemouth suburbs and the town of Christchurch itself which has expanded to include dedicated villages of sheltered housing on its outskirts.

Consequently, the present Christchurch seat contains one of the most elderly electorates in the country – only Eastbourne and East Devon have an older average voter age and Christchurch has the highest proportion of over-60s of all UK seats. Having recovered from an early-1990s by-election loss, it is today a very safe Conservative seat, with MP Christopher Chope attaining 65% of the votes, a majority of 47%, at the last general election. It is the safest Tory seat in the South West and on most analyses is on the fringe of the area that usually qualifies as the South West, served by a station with direct links to the capital and closest to London.

Bournemouth Airport is located in the constituency.

== Members of Parliament ==
=== Parliamentary borough (1572–1918) ===
==== MPs 1571–1640 ====
Parliament	First member	Second member
Parliament of 1571	Andrew Rogers	John Hyett
Parliament of 1572–1581	Henry Knollys	Matthew Evans
Parliament of 1584–1585	Alexander Nevill	Matthew Evans
Parliament of 1586–1587	Henry Ashley	Matthew Evans
Parliament of 1588–1589	Justinian Champernoun	Sampson Lennard
Parliament of 1593	John Herbert	John Agmondesham
Parliament of 1597–1598	Simon Willis	Andrew Rogers
Parliament of 1601	Simon Willis	Henry Meere
Parliament of 1604–1611	Richard Martin	Nicholas Hyde
Addled Parliament (1614)	Sir Thomas Norton	Henry Breton
Parliament of 1621–1622	Sir George Hastings	Nathaniel Tomkins
Happy Parliament (1624–1625)	Sir George Astmyll	Nathaniel Tomkins
Useless Parliament (1625)	Sir Thomas Wilford	Nathaniel Tomkins
Parliament of 1625–1626	Robert Mason	Nathaniel Tomkins
Parliament of 1628–1629	Henry Croke	Nathaniel Tomkins
No Parliament summoned 1629–1640

==== MPs 1640–1832 ====
Year	First member	First party	Second member	Second party
April 1640	Arnold Herbert		Henry Tulse	
November 1640	Matthew Davies	Royalist	Henry Tulse	
1642	Matthew Davies	Royalist	Tulse died September(?) 1642 – seat left vacant	
March 1643	Davies disabled from sitting – seat vacant		Tulse died September(?) 1642 – seat left vacant	
1645	Richard Edwards	Parliamentarian	John Kempe	Parliamentarian
December 1648	Richard Edwards	Parliamentarian	Kempe not recorded as sitting after Pride's Purge	
1653	Christchurch was unrepresented in the Barebones Parliament and the First and Second Parliaments of the Protectorate			
January 1659	John Bulkeley		Henry Tulse	
May 1659	Not represented in the restored Rump			
March 1660	John Hildesley		Henry Tulse	
1661	Humphrey Weld		Henry Tulse	
February 1679	Sir Thomas Clarges		Henry Tulse	
August 1679	Sir Thomas Clarges		George Fulford	
1685	Sir Thomas Clarges		Anthony Ettrick	
1689	Francis Gwyn		William Ettrick	
1695	Viscount Cornbury		William Ettrick	
1701	Francis Gwyn		William Ettrick	
1710	(Sir) Peter Mews		William Ettrick	
1717	(Sir) Peter Mews		Francis Gwyn	
1724 by-election	(Sir) Peter Mews		Edward Prideaux Gwyn	
1726 by-election	Jacob Banks		Edward Prideaux Gwyn	
1727	Joseph Hinxman		Charles Wither	
1732 by-election	Joseph Hinxman		Philip Lloyd	
1734	Joseph Hinxman		Edward Hooper	
1740 by-election	(Sir) Charles Armand Powlett		Edward Hooper	
1748 by-election	(Sir) Charles Armand Powlett		Sir Thomas Robinson	
1751 by-election	Harry Powlett		Sir Thomas Robinson	
1754	Hon. John Mordaunt		Sir Thomas Robinson	
1761	Hon. Thomas Robinson		James Harris	Whig
November 1770 by-election	James Harris (junior)	Whig	James Harris	Whig
1774	Hon. Thomas Villiers	Tory	James Harris	Whig
1780	Sir James Harris	Whig	James Harris	Whig
1781 by-election	Sir James Harris	Whig	(Sir) John Frederick	
1788 by-election	Hans Sloane	Tory	(Sir) John Frederick	
1790	Hans Sloane	Tory	George Rose	Tory
1796	William Stewart Rose	Tory	George Rose	Tory
May 1800 by-election	William Chamberlayne		George Rose	Tory
1802	William Sturges Bourne	Tory	George Rose	Tory
1812	William Edward Tomline	Tory	George Rose	Tory
March 1818 by-election	William Edward Tomline	Tory	Sir George Henry Rose	Tory
June 1818	William Sturges Bourne	Tory	Sir George Henry Rose	Tory
1826	George Pitt Rose	Tory	Sir George Henry Rose	Tory
1832	Representation reduced to one member			

==== MPs 1832–1918 ====
Year	Member	Party
1832	Sir George Tapps-Gervis	Conservative
1837	Sir George Henry Rose	Conservative
1844	Hon. Edward Harris	Conservative
1852	John Edward Walcott	Conservative
1868	Edmund Haviland-Burke	Liberal
1874	Sir Henry Drummond Wolff	Conservative
1880	Horace Davey	Liberal
1885	Charles Young	Conservative
1892	Abel Henry Smith	Conservative
1900	Kenneth Balfour	Conservative
1906	Arthur Acland Allen	Liberal
1910	Henry Page Croft	Conservative
1917	Henry Page Croft	National
1918	constituency abolished	

=== County constituency ===
==== MPs since 1983 ====
Election	Member	Party
1983	Robert Adley	Conservative
1993 by-election	Diana Maddock	Liberal Democrat
1997	Sir Christopher Chope	Conservative

== Elections 1983–present ==
=== Elections in the 2020s ===
General election 2024: Christchurch
Party	Candidate	Votes	%
Conservative	Christopher Chope	16,941	35.8
Liberal Democrats	Mike Cox	9,486	20.0
Reform	Robin Adamson	8,961	18.9
Labour	Joanna Howard	7,762	16.4
Green	Susan Graham	1,900	4.0
Independent	Simon McCormack	1,728	3.7
Animal Welfare	Sasha Jolliffe Yasawi	335	0.7
UKIP	Steve Unwin	163	0.3
SDP	Trevor Parsons	59	0.1
Majority		7,455	15.8
Turnout		47,335	66.6
Conservative win (new boundaries)			

=== Elections in the 2010s ===
General election 2019: Christchurch
Party	Candidate	Votes	%	±%
Conservative	Christopher Chope	33,894	65.2	−4.4
Liberal Democrats	Mike Cox	9,277	17.9	+10.0
Labour	Andrew Dunne	6,568	12.6	−7.3
Green	Chris Rigby	2,212	4.3	+1.7
Majority		24,617	47.3	−2.4
Turnout		51,951	72.6	+0.6
Conservative hold		Swing	−7.2	

General election 2017: Christchurch
Party	Candidate	Votes	%	±%
Conservative	Christopher Chope	35,230	69.6	+11.5
Labour	Patrick Canavan	10,059	19.9	+10.4
Liberal Democrats	Mike Cox	4,020	7.9	+1.3
Green	Chris Rigby	1,324	2.6	−1.7
Majority		25,171	49.7	+13.1
Turnout		50,633	72.0	+0.3
Conservative hold		Swing	+0.6	

General election 2015: Christchurch
Party	Candidate	Votes	%	±%
Conservative	Christopher Chope	28,887	58.1	+1.7
UKIP	Robin Grey	10,663	21.5	+13.0
Labour	Andrew Satherley	4,745	9.5	−0.3
Liberal Democrats	Andy Canning	3,263	6.6	−18.7
Green	Shona Dunn	2,149	4.3	N/A
Majority		18,224	36.6	+5.5
Turnout		49,707	71.7	−0.1
Conservative hold		Swing	−5.6	

General election 2010: Christchurch
Party	Candidate	Votes	%
Conservative	Christopher Chope	27,888	56.4
Liberal Democrats	Martyn Hurll	12,478	25.3
Labour	Robert Deeks	4,849	9.8
UKIP	David Williams	4,201	8.5
Majority		15,410	31.1
Turnout		49,416	71.8
Conservative win (new boundaries)			

=== Elections in the 2000s ===
General election 2005: Christchurch
Party	Candidate	Votes	%	±%
Conservative	Christopher Chope	28,208	54.7	−0.4
Liberal Democrats	Leslie Coman	12,649	24.5	−3.3
Labour	Jim King	8,051	15.6	+0.5
UKIP	David Hughes	2,657	5.2	+3.2
Majority		15,559	30.2	+2.9
Turnout		51,565	69.6	+2.1
Conservative hold		Swing	+1.4	

General election 2001: Christchurch
Party	Candidate	Votes	%	±%
Conservative	Christopher Chope	27,306	55.1	+8.7
Liberal Democrats	Dorothy Webb	13,762	27.8	−14.8
Labour	Judith Begg	7,506	15.1	+8.2
UKIP	Margaret Strange	993	2.0	+0.9
Majority		13,544	27.3	+23.5
Turnout		49,567	67.5	−11.0
Conservative hold		Swing	+11.8	

=== Elections in the 1990s ===
General election 1997: Christchurch
Party	Candidate	Votes	%
Conservative	Christopher Chope	26,095	46.4
Liberal Democrats	Diana Maddock	23,930	42.6
Labour	Charles Mannan	3,884	6.9
Referendum	Ray Spencer	1,684	3.0
UKIP	R.H. Dickinson	606	1.1
Majority		2,165	3.8
Turnout		56,199	78.5
Conservative win (new boundaries)			

By-election 1993: Christchurch
Party	Candidate	Votes	%	±%
Liberal Democrats	Diana Maddock	33,164	62.2	+38.6
Conservative	Robert Hayward	16,737	31.4	−32.1
Labour	Nigel Lickley	1,453	2.7	−9.4
Anti-Federalist League	Alan Sked	878	1.6	N/A
Monster Raving Loony	David Sutch	404	0.8	N/A
Ind. Conservative	Andrew Bannon	357	0.7	N/A
Sack Graham Taylor	Peter G. Newman	80	0.2	N/A
Buy the Daily Sport	Tara Bardot-Jackson	67	0.1	N/A
Save the National Health Service	Peter A. Hollyman	60	0.1	N/A
Highlander IV Wednesday Promotion	John P. Crockard	48	0.1	N/A
Natural Law	Mark Griffiths	45	0.1	−0.3
Ian For King	Mark Belcher	23	0.0	N/A
Alfred The Chicken	Karl Fitzhugh	18	0.0	N/A
Rainbow Alliance	John R. Walley	16	0.0	N/A
Majority		16,427	30.8	N/A
Turnout		53,350	74.2	−6.5
Liberal Democrats gain from Conservative		Swing	+35.4	

General election 1992: Christchurch
Party	Candidate	Votes	%	±%
Conservative	Robert Adley	36,627	63.5	−2.4
Liberal Democrats	Dennis Bussey	13,612	23.6	−0.9
Labour	Alan Lloyd	6,997	12.1	+2.5
Natural Law	James Barratt	243	0.4	N/A
Chauvinist Raving Alliance	Adrian Wareham	175	0.3	N/A
Majority		23,015	39.9	−1.5
Turnout		57,654	80.7	+4.4
Conservative hold		Swing	−0.7	

=== Elections in the 1980s ===
General election 1987: Christchurch
Party	Candidate	Votes	%	±%
Conservative	Robert Adley	35,656	65.9	−1.2
SDP	Hilary McKenzie	13,282	24.5	−0.8
Labour	Caralyn Longhurst	5,174	9.6	+2.0
Majority		22,374	41.4	−0.4
Turnout		54,112	76.3	+4.1
Conservative hold		Swing	−1.0	

General election 1983: Christchurch
Party	Candidate	Votes	%	±%
Conservative	Robert Adley	31,722	67.1	
SDP	Stephen Alexander	11,984	25.3	
Labour	John Mitchell	3,590	7.6	
Majority		19,738	41.8	
Turnout		47,296	72.2	
Conservative win (new seat)				

== Election results 1868–1918 ==
=== Elections in the 1860s ===
General election 1868: Christchurch
Party	Candidate	Votes	%	±%
Liberal	Edmund Haviland-Burke	609	52.1	+11.7
Conservative	Henry Drummond Wolff	560	47.9	−11.7
Majority		49	4.2	N/A
Turnout		1,169	88.0	+3.5
Registered electors		1,329		
Liberal gain from Conservative		Swing	+11.7	

=== Elections in the 1870s ===
General election 1874: Christchurch
Party	Candidate	Votes	%	±%
Conservative	Henry Drummond Wolff	978	61.7	+13.8
Liberal	Clement Milward	607	38.3	−13.8
Majority		371	23.4	N/A
Turnout		1,585	86.6	−1.4
Registered electors		1,831		
Conservative gain from Liberal		Swing	+13.8	

=== Elections in the 1880s ===
General election 1880: Christchurch
Party	Candidate	Votes	%	±%
Liberal	Horace Davey	1,185	51.5	+13.2
Conservative	John Edwards-Moss	1,117	48.5	−13.2
Majority		68	3.0	N/A
Turnout		2,302	90.1	+3.5
Registered electors		2,555		
Liberal gain from Conservative		Swing	+13.2	

General election 1885: Christchurch
Party	Candidate	Votes	%	±%
Conservative	Charles Young	2,184	52.1	+3.6
Liberal	Horace Davey	2,006	47.9	−3.6
Majority		178	4.2	N/A
Turnout		4,190	90.6	+0.5
Registered electors		4,626		
Conservative gain from Liberal		Swing	+3.6	

General election 1886: Christchurch
Party	Candidate	Votes	%	±%
Conservative	Charles Young	2,072	53.1	+1.0
Liberal	Alpheus Morton	1,833	46.9	−1.0
Majority		239	6.2	+2.0
Turnout		3,905	84.4	−6.2
Registered electors		4,626		
Conservative hold		Swing	+1.0	

=== Elections in the 1890s ===
Smith

General election 1892: Christchurch
Party	Candidate	Votes	%	±%
Conservative	Abel Henry Smith	2,803	51.9	−1.2
Liberal	Banister Fletcher	2,600	48.1	+1.2
Majority		203	3.8	−2.4
Turnout		5,403	85.8	+1.4
Registered electors		6,294		
Conservative hold		Swing	−1.2	

General election 1895: Christchurch
Party	Candidate	Votes	%	±%
Conservative	Abel Henry Smith	3,198	50.7	−1.2
Liberal	Thomas Brassey	3,114	49.3	+1.2
Majority		84	1.4	−2.4
Turnout		6,312	84.4	−1.4
Registered electors		7,477		
Conservative hold		Swing	−1.2	

=== Elections in the 1900s ===
General election 1900: Christchurch
Party	Candidate	Votes	%	±%
Conservative	Kenneth Balfour	3,407	50.1	−0.6
Liberal	Thomas Brassey	3,399	49.9	+0.6
Majority		8	0.2	−1.2
Turnout		6,806	83.9	−0.5
Registered electors		8,116		
Conservative hold		Swing	−0.6	

The original tally for the 1906 election had Balfour with 3,411 votes and Brassey with 3,408 votes. However, a recount resulted in the increased majority for Balfour.

Allen

General election 1906: Christchurch
Party	Candidate	Votes	%	±%
Liberal	Arthur Acland Allen	4,634	53.3	+3.4
Conservative	Kenneth Balfour	4,067	46.7	−3.4
Majority		567	6.6	N/A
Turnout		8,701	91.3	+7.4
Registered electors		9,530		
Liberal gain from Conservative		Swing	+3.4	

=== Elections in the 1910s ===
General election January 1910: Christchurch
Party	Candidate	Votes	%	±%
Conservative	Henry Croft	5,538	53.5	+6.8
Liberal	Arthur Acland Allen	4,807	46.5	−6.8
Majority		731	7.0	N/A
Turnout		10,345	94.1	+2.8
Registered electors		10,991		
Conservative gain from Liberal		Swing	+6.8	

Verney

General election December 1910: Christchurch
Party	Candidate	Votes	%	±%
Conservative	Henry Croft	5,275	53.3	−0.2
Liberal	Frederick Verney	4,619	46.7	+0.2
Majority		656	6.6	−0.4
Turnout		9,894	90.0	−4.1
Registered electors		10,991		
Conservative hold		Swing	−0.2	

General Election 1914–15:

Another General Election was required to take place before the end of 1915. The political parties had been making preparations for an election to take place and by July 1914, the following candidates had been selected;

- Unionist: Henry Croft
- Liberal:

== Election results 1832–1868 ==
=== Elections in the 1830s ===
General election 1832: Christchurch
Party	Candidate	Votes	%	±%
Tory	George Tapps	Unopposed		
Registered electors		206		
Tory hold				

General election 1835: Christchurch
Party	Candidate	Votes	%	±%
Conservative	George Tapps	Unopposed		
Registered electors		354		
Conservative hold				

General election 1837: Christchurch
Party	Candidate	Votes	%	±%
Conservative	George Henry Rose	116	52.3	N/A
Whig	William Gordon Cameron	106	47.7	New
Majority		10	4.6	N/A
Turnout		222	81.9	N/A
Registered electors		271		
Conservative hold		Swing	N/A	

=== Elections in the 1840s ===
General election 1841: Christchurch
Party	Candidate	Votes	%	±%
Conservative	George Henry Rose	Unopposed		
Registered electors		300		
Conservative hold				

Rose resigned by accepting the office of Steward of the Manor of Northstead, causing a by-election.

By-election, 28 March 1844: Christchurch
Party	Candidate	Votes	%	±%
Conservative	Edward Harris	180	68.2	N/A
Whig	William Tice	84	31.8	New
Majority		96	36.4	N/A
Turnout		264	79.8	N/A
Registered electors		331		
Conservative hold		Swing	N/A	

General election 1847: Christchurch
Party	Candidate	Votes	%	±%
Conservative	Edward Harris	Unopposed		
Registered electors		301		
Conservative hold				

=== Elections in the 1850s ===
General election 1852: Christchurch
Party	Candidate	Votes	%	±%
Conservative	John Edward Walcott	Unopposed		
Registered electors		313		
Conservative hold				

General election 1857: Christchurch
Party	Candidate	Votes	%	±%
Conservative	John Edward Walcott	Unopposed		
Registered electors		328		
Conservative hold				

General election 1859: Christchurch
Party	Candidate	Votes	%	±%
Conservative	John Edward Walcott	Unopposed		
Registered electors		339		
Conservative hold				

=== Elections in the 1860s ===
General election 1865: Christchurch
Party	Candidate	Votes	%	±%
Conservative	John Edward Walcott	211	59.6	N/A
Liberal	Edmund Haviland-Burke	143	40.4	New
Majority		68	19.2	N/A
Turnout		354	84.5	N/A
Registered electors		419		
Conservative hold		Swing	N/A	

== Elections before 1832 ==
General election 1831: Christchurch
Party	Candidate	Votes	%	±%
Tory	George Henry Rose	Unopposed		
Tory	George Pitt Rose	Unopposed		
Registered electors		36		
Tory hold				
Tory hold				

General election 1830: Christchurch
Party	Candidate	Votes	%	±%
Tory	George Henry Rose	Unopposed		
Tory	George Pitt Rose	Unopposed		
Tory hold				
Tory hold				

== See also ==
- List of parliamentary constituencies in Dorset

== Sources ==
- The BBC/ITN Guide to the New Parliamentary Constituencies (Chichester: Parliamentary Research Services, 1983)
- Boundaries of Parliamentary Constituencies 1885–1972, compiled and edited by F.W.S. Craig (Parliamentary Reference Publications 1972)
- British Parliamentary Election Results 1832–1885, compiled and edited by F.W.S. Craig (Macmillan Press 1977)
- British Parliamentary Election Results 1885–1918, compiled and edited by F.W.S. Craig (Macmillan Press 1974)
- Who's Who of British Members of Parliament: Volume I 1832–1885, edited by M. Stenton (The Harvester Press 1976)
- Who's Who of British Members of Parliament, Volume II 1886–1918, edited by M. Stenton and S. Lees (Harvester Press 1978)
- Who's Who of British Members of Parliament, Volume III 1919–1945, edited by M. Stenton and S. Lees (Harvester Press 1979)
- Robert Beatson, A Chronological Register of Both Houses of Parliament (London: Longman, Hurst, Res & Orme, 1807)
- D Brunton & D H Pennington, Members of the Long Parliament (London: George Allen & Unwin, 1954)
- Cobbett's Parliamentary history of England, from the Norman Conquest in 1066 to the year 1803 (London: Thomas Hansard, 1808)
- Maija Jansson (ed.), Proceedings in Parliament, 1614 (House of Commons) (Philadelphia: American Philosophical Society, 1988) * J E Neale, The Elizabethan House of Commons (London: Jonathan Cape, 1949)
- J Holladay Philbin, Parliamentary Representation 1832 – England and Wales (New Haven: Yale University Press, 1965)
- Willis, Browne (1750). Notitia Parliamentaria, Part II: A Series or Lists of the Representatives in the several Parliaments held from the Reformation 1541, to the Restoration 1660 ... London. p. 1.
- Frederic A Youngs, jr, Guide to the Local Administrative Units of England, Vol I (London: Royal Historical Society, 1979)
