= The John Fisher School =

Catholic school in Greater London, England

Location
- Peaks Hill; Purley, London, Surrey, CR8 3YP; United Kingdom; 51°20′44″N 0°08′02″W

Information
- Type: Faith school voluntary-aided Selective school 1991–2008; Independent school 1929–1977
- Religious affiliation: Roman Catholic
- Established: 1929
- Founder: Peter Amigo
- Department for Education URN: 103009 Tables
- Ofsted: Reports
- Headteacher: Robert F. Teague
- Gender: Males
- Age: 11 to 18
- Enrollment: 1113
- Capacity: 1195
- Houses: Becket; Bede; Challoner; Fisher; More; Newman; Teresa
- Colours: Year 7 – Year 9 Year 10 – Year 11 Year 12 – Year 13
- Publication: The Kingfisher; The Fishtickler; Newsletter; The Student Voice
- Feeder schools: Laleham Lea Primary School
- Alumni: John Fisher Old Boys Association
- Website: www.johnfisherschool.org

The John Fisher School is a Roman Catholic voluntary-aided boys' faith school based at Peaks Hill, near Purley, South London. The school is located in and funded by the London Borough of Sutton. It occupies the former site of the 19th-century prep school Falconbury School. The school operates as a faith (Roman Catholic) comprehensive School, educating boys mainly from south and central Croydon. It has a history of selection, and (as a selective entry grant-maintained school, and before that as a fee-paying boys' grammar school) has drawn pupils from across London and South East England.

The school has operated selective admissions policies twice in its history, from when it was founded in 1929 until 1977, and more recently from 1991 to 2008. It was, alongside the London Oratory School, one of the last selective entry Catholic comprehensive schools to defy the Schools' Admissions Code by continuing to interview prospective pupils and their parents. There have been no parental interviews since 2008, with the final cohort of boys selected by interview leaving the school in the Summer of 2014.

The school has grown since the end of its selection policy from 700 pupils to over 1000, and was set to grow even more beginning in 2016 (30 additional places).

== History ==
The John Fisher School was founded by Peter Emmanuel Amigo, Archbishop of Southwark, in 1929 at Duppas Hill in Croydon, and moved in 1931 to its current premises in Peaks Hill, Purley. Despite the school selecting all of its pupils it was nominally comprehensive because not all boys were selected purely on academic ability. GM Catholic schools that examined candidates and interviewed potential pupils and their parents were often controversial. In September 2008, the school stopped all forms of selection and became a local voluntary-aided comprehensive school, serving Croydon and Sutton, once more. In 2003, John Fisher School became a specialist sports college and construction began on a £1.2 million sports hall opened by Sir Bobby Robson.

Since the end of its selective admissions process the school came under fire for "its controversial points admission system which favoured children from families who are the most active in the church." The school was investigated by the Office of the Schools Adjudicator (OSA) after complaints from a parent. Objections to the OSA included "governors could manipulate what was considered a bona fide parish activity to 'exclude those they do not wish to admit from the school'" and "that governors were using surnames to reject single parents". The OSA did not endorse the latter claim but made "the strongest recommendation" that the current system be scrapped. This is the second time the school's admission policy has been investigated by the OSA following complaints.

In March 2022, the school invited the children's author Simon James Green to speak at the school and sign books as part of the national Book Week event. However, after a number of parents complained about what they considered to be the blasphemous and age inappropriate sexual content of some of the author's published work, the Catholic Archdiocese of Southwark instructed the school to withdraw the invitation and subsequently removed the foundation governors after the Governing Board had narrowly voted in favour of the visit continuing.

Concerns over the governance in this matter triggered a snap Ofsted inspection, which reported that the archdiocese had acted unilaterally and without regard to statutory guidance. Ofsted said that as a priority, "immediate steps must be taken to restore stability to governance, and in turn ensure that leadership is provided". The inspectors overlooked the fact that at the time of their inspection the Archdiocese had already appointed seven new Foundation Governors to replace those who had either been removed or resigned. Six days of strike action by members of the National Education Union followed in protest at the archdiocese's actions.

In recent years, due to tightening up in the schools' admissions code and the abolition of first preference first criteria, the school has developed and expanded to become more of a standard non-selective local Roman Catholic boys' comprehensive school, mainly serving the areas of South & Central Croydon, North Surrey, Bromley and Sutton.

== Description ==
=== Admissions at 11+ ===
Boys are admitted to the school at the ages of 11 or 16. Entry at 11+ is non-selective (since September 2008). Since 2013 for the first time in its history, the school now admits boys who either fail or fail to score highly enough in the 11+ used for grammar school entry. Approximately 190 boys are admitted in Year 7.

John Fisher was a small selective school from 1991 until September 2008. During the school's selection policy (when there was no consideration for boys living closest to the school whatsoever) it was taking boys from 20 to 30 miles away, but, due to its highly selective nature and high academic attainment, it was seen by many parents as an alternative to independent schools.

The assessment consisted of a candidate and parent interview, a religion test, a written statement by the boy stating why he would like to attend the school and a report from the boy's current school. A smaller number of boys were selected for academic, musical and sports aptitude, in conjunction with an interview. There have been no interviews since 2008.

== Sporting results ==
=== Rugby Union ===
The 7s team reached three consecutive national finals between 1997 and 1999 winning two and losing the 1999 final against Stonyhurst; they lost the 2008 final 19–0 to Sedbergh School. The school's U15s reached the final of The Daily Mail Cup in the 2000/2001 season, losing to Epsom College. The school has rugby rivalries with Whitgift School, London Oratory School and Dulwich College. It is the only comprehensive school with a rugby fixture against Eton College.

==== Overall summary 1st XV ====
Played since 2000	Won by John Fisher School	Won by Whitgift School	Drawn
28	5	23	0

==== Overall summary U15A ====
Played since 2004	Won by John Fisher School	Won by Whitgift School	Drawn
19	3	16	0

== The John Fisher Association ==
The JFA, a registered charity, was founded in 1996. Located at 33 Park Hill Carshalton, it was founded for the "advancement of the education of the pupils of The John Fisher School" and undertakes activities which contribute financially and socially to the school. The charity provide scholarships and bursaries during the school's selection policy.

== Old Boys Association and alumni groups ==
The John Fisher Old Boys Association (JFOBA) is a members club for past pupils and teachers of The John Fisher School in Purley, Surrey. Membership is available to all former pupils of school, and those members and former members of the school's staff invited to be Honorary Members.

== Notable former pupils ==
=== Arts and media ===
- Stefano Hatfield, newspaper editor
- Bill Nighy, actor
- Matthew Wright, journalist and television presenter. Featured in I'm a Celebrity...Get Me Out of Here! in 2013
- Gilles Peterson, radio personality, DJ, and record label owner
- Diarmuid Byron O'Connor, sculptor
- Jack Scarisbrick, anti-abortion activist and Tudor historian
- Jim Buttress, horticulturalist and presenter

=== Law ===
- James Lewis, Chief Justice of the Falkland Islands and the British Indian Ocean Territory

=== Military ===
- Eric de la Torre, veteran of the St Nazaire Raid
- John Walters, Royal Navy Rear admiral, Chief Naval Judge Advocate, Assistant Chief of the Defence Staff (Personnel and Logistics)

=== Science ===
- Professor Sir David Lane, cancer research scientist

=== Sport ===
- Simon Hunt, England sevens and Ebbw Vale rugby union player (during the selection policy)
- Tim and Chris Murtagh, professional cricket players (both attended during the selection policy)
- Martyn Rooney, Beijing Olympics Team GB 400m finalist (During the selection policy)
- Paul Sackey, England (21 caps), London Wasps and RC Toulonnais rugby union player (during the selection policy)
- George Skivington, England Saxons and London Wasps rugby union player
- Franz Stampfl, athletics coach – coached Roger Bannister, Chris Chataway and Chris Brasher
- Kyle Traynor, Scotland (three caps) and Edinburgh Rugby Club; also Scotland U18, 19, 21 (captain) (during the selection policy)
- Zane Scotland, PGA Tour golfer (during the selection policy)
- Walter D'Hondt, Olympic rowing gold medalist
- Laurie Evans, cricketer; plays for Warwickshire County Cricket Club (during the selection policy)
- Matthew Leek, rugby union player (during the selection policy)
- Simon King, cricketer; played for Surrey County Cricket Club between 2006 and 2011
- Kieran Treadwell, rugby union, formerly of Harlequins, currently plays for Ulster Rugby and Ireland
- Alex Dombrandt, rugby union, Harlequins, winner of 2021 Rugby Premiership; England international
- Ben Waghorn, rugby union, Harlequins
