= Kyle Traynor =

Scotland international rugby union player (born 1986)

- Born: 27 February 1986 (age 40) Farnborough, London, England
- Height: 1.82 m (6 ft 0 in)
- Weight: 118 kg (18 st 8 lb)
- School: The John Fisher School
- University: University of Oxford; Edinburgh Napier University

Rugby union career
- Position: Prop
- Current team: Gloucester Rugby
Senior career
Years	Team	Apps	(Points)
2005–2012	Edinburgh	87	(20)
2012–2017	Bristol Bears	97	(20)
2017–2018	Leicester Tigers	15	(0)
2018–2019	Gloucester	8	(0)
- Correct as of 10 March 2018
International career
Years	Team	Apps	(Points)
2009–2012	Scotland	4	(0)
2009	Scotland A	12	(5)
2015	Barbarians	2	
- Correct as of 25 November 2012

Kyle Traynor (born 27 February 1986) is a retired Scottish rugby union prop who played four times for Scotland between 2009 and 2012, he played club rugby for Edinburgh, Bristol Bears, Leicester Tigers and Gloucester.

== Early life ==
Traynor was born in Farnborough, London to Glaswegian parents and was educated at The John Fisher School.

== Career ==
Traynor signed a development contract with the Scottish Rugby Union's National Academy, which allowed him to divide his time between training with Edinburgh, playing for Watsonians and studying for a degree in quantity surveying at Edinburgh Napier University. After completing his degree in 2008, Traynor signed a full-time contract with Edinburgh and has gone on to represent Scotland A, debuting against Italy A in February 2009 and Scotland, coming on as a replacement against Fiji in 2009 Autumn internationals. He has twice played for the Barbarians, first appearing for them in August 2015 against Samoa in a match played at the Olympic Stadium in London.

At the end of the 2011–12 season Traynor left Edinburgh Rugby, and signed a contract to play for Bristol Bears ahead of the 2012–13 season.

On 20 September 2017 it was announced Traynor had joined Leicester Tigers.

On 26 October 2018, after departing from Leicester, Traynor has signed a short-term contract with Gloucester amidst an injury crisis within their front-row. He made his debut, on the bench, as a replacement against Wasps in the Premiership Rugby Cup on 27 October 2018.

On 2 March 2019 Traynor graduated from the University of Oxford (Kellogg College) with a master's degree. Although he studied at the university, he never played in the Varsity Match against Cambridge as he was not eligible due to playing in the Premiership.

On 19 May 2019 Traynor announced his retirement.
