= Henry Tulse (died 1697) =

English politician

Henry Tulse (c. 1636 – 7 June 1697) was an English politician who sat in the House of Commons at various times between 1659 and 1679.

Tulse was the son of Henry Tulse of Hinton Admiral and his wife Margaret. His father died in 1642 and his mother subsequently married John Hildesley. He entered Wadham College, Oxford in 1653. He was also admitted at Middle Temple in 1653.

In 1659, Tulse was elected Member of Parliament for Christchurch in the Third Protectorate Parliament. In 1660, he was elected MP for Christchurch in the Convention Parliament. He was re-elected MP for Christchurch in 1661 for the Cavalier Parliament and held the seat until 1679.

Tulse was the cousin of Sir Henry Tulse, Lord Mayor of London.

Parliament of England
Preceded by Not represented in Second Protectorate Parliament	Member of Parliament for Christchurch; 1659; With: John Bulkeley	Succeeded by Not represented in restored Rump
