= Falconbury School =

Coordinates: 51.34548°N 0.13386°W

Information
- School type: Prep school
- Established: 1899
- Founder: George Mannings Faulkner
- Closed: 1968
- Gender: Boys

Falconbury School was a prep school based in Peaks Hill, now in the London Borough of Croydon.

Falconbury's buildings in Purley became home to The John Fisher School in 1931; a former Catholic Public and Boarding School, latterly (in the 1990s) a highly selective Catholic day school and now a non-selective Catholic comprehensive school for boys.

== At Peaks Hill ==
Peaks Hill at the time, was a rural neighbourhood in north Surrey; it has since merged with the expansion of Croydon and these days is more suburban in nature.

Falconbury school prepared boys for entry to some of the major Public Schools in England; including Eton College and Sherborne School.

== History ==
Falconbury was founded in 1899 by George Mannings Faulkner (1871–1951).

=== Relocations ===
In 1903/4, the school relocated to Purley, which was then part of Surrey.

In 1930, the school relocated again, this time to Little Common, near Bexhill-on-Sea, East Sussex.

In 1940, Falconbury School temporarily relocated to Astrop Park in Oxfordshire until the end of WWII.

=== Dissolution ===
In 1968, the school merged to become part of Claremont School.
