= List of United Kingdom by-elections (1885–1900) =

This is a list of parliamentary by-elections in the United Kingdom held between 1885 and 1900, with the names of the previous incumbent and the victor in the by-election and their respective parties. Where seats changed political party at the election, the result is highlighted: light blue for Conservative Party gain (including Liberal Unionist and Irish Unionist), orange for Liberal gain (including Liberal-Labour and Liberal/Crofter), light green for an Irish Parliamentary Party (including the Irish National Federation Anti-Parnellite Nationalist group from March 1891, but not the Irish National League Parnellite Nationalist faction when the IPP was split between December 1890 and 1900) gain and grey for any other gain.

== Resignations ==
Where the cause of by-election is given as "resignation" or "seeks re-election", this indicates that the incumbent was appointed on his own request to an "office of profit under the Crown", either the Steward of the Chiltern Hundreds or the Steward of the Manor of Northstead. These appointments are made as a constitutional device for leaving the House of Commons, whose Members are not permitted to resign.

== Ministerial by-elections ==
The Succession to the Crown Act 1707 required ministers to seek re-election to the House of Commons on their appointment to office. The Re-Election of Ministers Act 1919 ended the necessity to seek re-election within nine months of a general election, and the Re-Election of Ministers Act (1919) Amendment Act 1926 ended the practice in all other cases.

== By-elections ==
=== 26th Parliament (1895–1900) ===
| By-election | Date | Incumbent | Party | Winner | Party | Cause |
| Wilton | 17 July 1900 (Note: An uncontested by-election.) | Viscount Folkestone | Conservative | James Archibald Morrison | Conservative | Succession to the peerage |
| Manchester South | 29 May 1900 | Marquis of Lorne | Liberal Unionist | William Peel | Liberal Unionist | Succession to the peerage |
| Isle of Wight | 23 May 1900 | Sir Richard Webster | Conservative | John Seely | Conservative | Resignation |
| Dublin University | 16 May 1900 | Edward Carson | Irish Unionist | Edward Carson | Irish Unionist | Solicitor General (Note: Seat vacated on appointment to the office noted.) |
| Edinburgh and St Andrews Universities | 3 May 1900 | Sir William Overend Priestley | Conservative | Sir John Batty Tuke | Conservative | Death |
| Portsmouth | 3 May 1900 | Walter Clough | Liberal | Thomas Bramsdon | Liberal | Resignation |
| Holborn | 23 March 1900 | Sir Charles Hall | Conservative | James Remnant | Conservative | Death |
| Brixton | 20 March 1900 | Evelyn Hubbard | Conservative | Sir Robert Mowbray | Conservative | Resignation |
| North Sligo | 7 March 1900 | Bernard Collery | Irish National Federation | John O'Dowd | Irish Parliamentary | Resignation |
| South Mayo | 27 February 1900 | Michael Davitt | Irish National Federation | John O'Donnell | Irish Parliamentary | Resignation |
| Newark | 16 February 1900 | Viscount Newark | Conservative | Sir Charles Welby | Conservative | Succession to the peerage |
| Plymouth | 16 February 1900 | Sir Edward Clarke | Conservative | Ivor Guest | Conservative | Resignation |
| Rossendale | 13 February 1900 | John Maden | Liberal | Sir William Mather | Liberal | Resignation |
| Mid Armagh | 12 February 1900 | Dunbar Barton | Irish Unionist | John Lonsdale | Irish Unionist | Resignation |
| London University | 6–10 February 1900 | Sir John Lubbock | Liberal Unionist | Sir Michael Foster | Liberal Unionist | Elevation to the peerage |
| York | 6 February 1900 | Lord Charles Beresford | Conservative | Denison Faber | Conservative | Resignation |
| Clackmannanshire and Kinross-shire | 20 December 1899 | John Balfour | Liberal | Eugene Wason | Liberal | Resignation |
| Wells | 7 December 1899 | Hylton Jolliffe | Conservative | Robert Edmund Dickinson | Conservative | Succession to the peerage |
| Exeter | 6 November 1899 | Henry Northcote | Conservative | Sir Edgar Vincent | Conservative | Resignation |
| Bow and Bromley | 27 October 1899 | Lionel Holland | Conservative | Walter Guthrie | Conservative | Resignation |
| St Pancras East | 12 July 1899 | Robert Grant Webster | Conservative | Thomas Wrightson | Conservative | Resignation |
| Oldham (Note: One gain (Runciman) not retained and one gain (Emmott) retained at the 1900 UK general election, in the two member Oldham constituency.) | 6 July 1899 | Robert Ascroft | Conservative | Alfred Emmott | Liberal | Death |
| Oldham | 6 July 1899 | James Francis Oswald | Conservative | Walter Runciman | Liberal | Resignation |
| Osgoldcross (Note: Gain retained at the 1900 UK general election.) | 5 July 1899 | Sir John Austin | Liberal | Sir John Austin | Independent Liberal | Seeks re-election on leaving party |
| Edinburgh East | 23 June 1899 | Robert Wallace | Liberal | George McCrae | Liberal | Death |
| Edinburgh South (Note: Gain not retained at the 1900 general election.) | 19 June 1899 | Robert Cox | Liberal Unionist | Arthur Dewar | Liberal | Death |
| Southport | 30 May 1899 | Sir Herbert Naylor-Leyland | Liberal | George Augustus Pilkington | Liberal | Death |
| Oxford University | 11 May 1899 | Sir John Robert Mowbray | Conservative | Sir William Anson | Liberal Unionist | Death |
| Merionethshire | 2 May 1899 | T. E. Ellis | Liberal | Owen Morgan Edwards | Liberal | Death |
| Harrow | 5 April 1899 | William Ambrose | Conservative | Irwin Cox | Conservative | Resignation (Master in Lunacy) |
| North Norfolk | 16 March 1899 | Herbert Cozens-Hardy | Liberal | William Brampton Gurdon | Liberal | Resignation |
| Elland | 8 March 1899 | Thomas Wayman | Liberal | Charles Philips Trevelyan | Liberal | Resignation |
| Hythe | 1 March 1899 | Sir James Edwards | Conservative | Sir Edward Sassoon | Conservative | Resignation |
| North Antrim | 25 February 1899 | Hugh McCalmont | Irish Unionist | William Moore | Irish Unionist | Resignation |
| Rotherham | 23 February 1899 | Arthur Dyke Acland | Liberal | William Holland | Liberal | Resignation |
| North West Lanarkshire | 21 February 1899 | John Goundry Holburn | Liberal | Charles Mackinnon Douglas | Liberal | Death |
| Londonderry City | 16 February 1899 | Edmund Vesey Knox | Irish National Federation | Arthur John Moore | Irish Parliamentary | Resignation |
| Birmingham North | 14 February 1899 | William Kenrick | Liberal Unionist | John Throgmorton Middlemore | Liberal Unionist | Resignation |
| Epsom | 23 January 1899 | Thomas Bucknill | Conservative | William Keswick | Conservative | Resignation |
| Newton | 16 January 1899 | Thomas Legh | Conservative | Richard Pilkington | Conservative | Succession to the peerage |
| Aylesbury | 6 January 1899 | Ferdinand James de Rothschild | Liberal Unionist | Lionel Walter Rothschild | Liberal Unionist | Death |
| Liverpool Kirkdale | 9 December 1898 | Sir George Baden-Powell | Conservative | David MacIver | Conservative | Death |
| Oxford | 4 November 1898 | Viscount Valentia | Conservative | Viscount Valentia | Conservative | Comptroller of the Household |
| North Fermanagh | 1 November 1898 | Richard Dane | Irish Unionist | Edward Archdale | Irish Unionist | Resignation |
| Ormskirk | 20 October 1898 | Sir Arthur Bower Forwood | Conservative | Arthur Stanley | Conservative | Death |
| Darlington | 17 September 1898 | Arthur Pease | Liberal Unionist | Herbert Pike Pease | Liberal Unionist | Death |
| North Down | 7 September 1898 | Thomas Waring | Irish Unionist | John Blakiston-Houston | Irish Unionist | Death |
| Southport (Note: Gain in 1898 retained at the 1899 Southport by-election, but not retained at the 1900 general election.) | 24 August 1898 | George Nathaniel Curzon | Conservative | Sir Herbert Naylor-Leyland | Liberal | Resignation |
| Launceston | 3 August 1898 | Thomas Owen | Liberal | Sir John Fletcher Moulton | Liberal | Death |
| Great Grimsby | 2 August 1898 | Sir George Doughty | Liberal | Sir George Doughty | Liberal Unionist | Seeks re-election on changing party |
| Reading | 25 July 1898 | Charles Townshend Murdoch | Conservative | George William Palmer | Liberal | Death |
| West Down | 18 July 1898 | Lord Arthur Hill | Irish Unionist | Arthur Hill | Irish Unionist | Resignation |
| Gravesend | 13 July 1898 | James Dampier Palmer | Conservative | John Ryder | Conservative | Resignation |
| Durham | 30 June 1898 | Matthew Fowler | Liberal | Arthur Elliot | Liberal Unionist | Death |
| Hertford | 22 June 1898 | Abel Smith | Conservative | Evelyn Cecil | Conservative | Death |
| South Norfolk | 12 May 1898 | Francis Taylor | Liberal Unionist | Arthur Wellesley Soames | Liberal | Resignation |
| Newark | 11 May 1898 | Harold Finch-Hatton | Conservative | Viscount Newark | Conservative | Resignation |
| West Staffordshire | 10 May 1898 | Hamar Alfred Bass | Liberal Unionist | Sir Alexander Henderson | Liberal Unionist | Death |
| Wokingham | 30 March 1898 | Sir George Russell | Conservative | Oliver Young | Conservative | Death |
| Maidstone | 26 March 1898 | Sir Frederick Hunt | Conservative | Fiennes Cornwallis | Conservative | Resignation |
| Stepney | 9 March 1898 | Frederick Wootton Isaacson | Conservative | W. C. Steadman | Lib-Lab | Death |
| Cricklade | 24 February 1898 | Alfred Hopkinson | Liberal Unionist | Lord Edmond FitzMaurice | Liberal | Resignation |
| Birmingham Edgbaston | 15 February 1898 | George Dixon | Liberal Unionist | Sir Francis William Lowe | Conservative | Death |
| Pembrokeshire | 15 February 1898 | William Rees-Davies | Liberal | John Wynford Philipps | Liberal | Resignation |
| Marylebone West | 3 February 1898 | Sir Horace Brand Townsend Farquhar | Liberal Unionist | Sir Samuel Scott | Conservative | Elevation to the peerage |
| South East Durham | 3 February 1898 | Sir Henry Havelock-Allan | Liberal Unionist | Joseph Richardson | Liberal | Death |
| Wolverhampton South | 3 February 1898 | Charles Pelham Villiers | Liberal Unionist | John Lloyd Gibbons | Liberal Unionist | Death |
| Dublin St Stephen's Green | 21 January 1898 | William Kenny | Liberal Unionist | James Campbell | Irish Unionist | Resignation |
| Mid Armagh | 21 January 1898 | Dunbar Barton | Irish Unionist | Dunbar Barton | Irish Unionist | Solicitor General for Ireland |
| York | 13 January 1898 | Frank Lockwood | Liberal | Lord Charles Beresford | Conservative | Death |
| Plymouth | 12 January 1898 | Charles Harrison | Liberal | Sigismund Mendl | Liberal | Death |
| Deptford | 15 November 1897 | Charles John Darling | Conservative | Arthur Henry Aylmer Morton | Conservative | Resignation |
| Liverpool Exchange | 10 November 1897 | John Charles Bigham | Liberal Unionist | Charles McArthur | Liberal Unionist | Resignation |
| Middleton | 4 November 1897 | Thomas Fielden | Conservative | James Duckworth | Liberal | Death |
| Barnsley | 28 October 1897 | Earl Compton | Liberal | Joseph Walton | Liberal | Succession to the peerage |
| East Denbighshire | 28 September 1897 | Sir George Osborne Morgan | Liberal | Samuel Moss | Liberal | Death |
| Sheffield Brightside | 6 August 1897 | Anthony John Mundella | Liberal | Frederick Maddison | Lib-Lab | Death |
| South Roscommon | 15 July 1897 | Luke Hayden | Irish National League | John Patrick Hayden | Irish National League | Death |
| Petersfield | 8 June 1897 | William Wickham | Conservative | William Graham Nicholson | Conservative | Death |
| Halifax | 3 March 1897 | William Rawson Shaw | Liberal | Alfred Billson | Liberal | Resignation |
| Chertsey | 18 February 1897 | Charles Harvey Combe | Conservative | Henry Leigh-Bennett | Conservative | Resignation |
| Glasgow Bridgeton | 15 February 1897 | Sir George Trevelyan | Liberal | Sir Charles Cameron | Liberal | Resignation |
| Walthamstow | 3 February 1897 | Edmund Widdrington Byrne | Conservative | Sam Woods | Lib-Lab | Resignation |
| Romford | 1 February 1897 | Alfred Money Wigram | Conservative | Louis Sinclair | Conservative | Resignation |
| Forfarshire | 30 January 1897 | James Martin White | Liberal | John Sinclair | Liberal | Resignation |
| Salisbury | 27 January 1897 | Edward Hulse | Conservative | Augustus Henry Eden Allhusen | Conservative | Resignation |
| Cleveland | 12 January 1897 | Henry Fell Pease | Liberal | Alfred Edward Pease | Liberal | Death |
| Bradford East | 10 November 1896 | Henry Byron Reed | Conservative | Ronald Henry Fulke Greville | Conservative | Death |
| Frome | 2 June 1896 | Viscount Weymouth | Conservative | John Barlow | Liberal | Succession to the peerage |
| Wick Burghs | 2 June 1896 | Sir John Pender | Liberal Unionist | Thomas Charles Hunter Hedderwick | Liberal | Resignation |
| Edinburgh and St Andrews Universities | 12 May 1896 | Sir Charles Pearson | Conservative | Sir William Overend Priestley | Conservative | Resignation |
| Aberdeen North | 1 May 1896 | William Alexander Hunter | Liberal | Duncan Pirie | Liberal | Resignation |
| North Kerry | 24 April 1896 | Thomas Sexton | Irish National Federation | Michael Joseph Flavin | Irish National Federation | Resignation |
| Dublin College Green | 6 April 1896 | J. E. Kenny | Irish National League | James Laurence Carew | Irish National League | Resignation |
| East Kerry | 27 March 1896 | Michael Davitt | Irish National Federation | James Roche | Irish National Federation | Sat for South Mayo |
| South Louth | 19 March 1896 | Daniel Ambrose | Irish National Federation | Richard McGhee | Irish National Federation | Death |
| Lichfield | 26 February 1896 | Henry Charles Fulford | Liberal | Courtenay Warner | Liberal | Void election |
| Montrose Burghs | 22 February 1896 | John Shiress Will | Liberal | John Morley | Liberal | Resignation |
| Southampton | 22 February 1896 | Tankerville Chamberlayne | Conservative | Sir Francis Henry Evans | Liberal | Void election |
| Wycombe | 21 February 1896 | Viscount Curzon | Conservative | Viscount Curzon | Conservative | Treasurer of the Household |
| Brixton | 30 January 1896 | Marquess of Carmarthen | Conservative | Evelyn Hubbard | Conservative | Succession to the peerage |
| St Pancras South | 28 January 1896 | Sir Julian Goldsmid | Liberal Unionist | Herbert Jessel | Liberal Unionist | Death |
| Belfast North | 22 January 1896 | Sir Edward Harland | Irish Unionist | Sir James Horner Haslett | Irish Unionist | Death |
| Dublin University | 2–6 December 1895 | David Plunket | Irish Unionist | William Edward Hartpole Lecky | Liberal Unionist | Elevation to the peerage |
| Harrow | 30 November 1895 | William Ambrose | Conservative | William Ambrose | Conservative | Attorney-General of the Duchy of Lancaster |
| Liverpool East Toxteth | 29 November 1895 | Henry de Worms | Conservative | Augustus Frederick Warr | Conservative | Elevation to the peerage |
| Kensington South | 28 November 1895 | Sir Algernon Borthwick | Conservative | Lord Lovaine | Conservative | Elevation to the peerage |
| West Waterford | 12 September 1895 | Alfred Webb | Irish National Federation | J. J. O'Shee | Irish National Federation | Resignation |
| Limerick City | 11 September 1895 | John Daly | Irish National League | Francis Arthur O'Keefe | Irish National Federation | Disqualification |
| South Kerry | 5 September 1895 | Denis Kilbride | Irish National Federation | Thomas Joseph Farrell | Irish National Federation | Sat for North Galway |
| Dublin St Stephen's Green | 2 September 1895 | William Kenny | Liberal Unionist | William Kenny | Liberal Unionist | Solicitor General for Ireland |
| Inverness Burghs | 31 August 1895 | Robert Finlay | Liberal Unionist | Robert Finlay | Liberal Unionist | Solicitor General |
| West Cavan | 2 August 1895 | Edmund Vesey Knox | Irish National Federation | J. P. Farrell | Irish National Federation | Sat for Londonderry City |
=== 25th Parliament (1892–1895) ===
| By-election | Date | Incumbent | Party | Winner | Party | Cause |
| Ealing | 8 July 1895 (Note: An uncontested by-election.) | Lord George Hamilton | Conservative | Lord George Hamilton | Conservative | Secretary of State for India (Note: Seat vacated on appointment to the office noted.) |
| Sleaford | 6 July 1895 | Henry Chaplin | Conservative | Henry Chaplin | Conservative | President of the Local Government Board |
| Blackpool | 6 July 1895 | Sir Matthew Ridley | Conservative | Sir Matthew Ridley | Conservative | Secretary of State for the Home Department |
| Croydon | 5 July 1895 | Charles Ritchie | Conservative | Charles Ritchie | Conservative | President of the Board of Trade |
| Manchester East | 1 July 1895 | Arthur Balfour | Conservative | Arthur Balfour | Conservative | First Lord of the Treasury |
| Bristol West | 1 July 1895 | Sir Michael Hicks Beach | Conservative | Sir Michael Hicks Beach | Conservative | Chancellor of the Exchequer |
| Birmingham West | 1 July 1895 | Joseph Chamberlain | Liberal Unionist | Joseph Chamberlain | Liberal Unionist | Secretary of State for the Colonies |
| St George's Hanover Square | 29 June 1895 | George Goschen | Conservative | George Goschen | Conservative | First Lord of the Admiralty |
| Cork City | 27 June 1895 | William O'Brien | Irish National Federation | J. F. X. O'Brien | Irish National Federation | Resignation |
| Inverness-shire (Note: Gain retained at the 1895 UK general election.) | 13 June 1895 | Donald MacGregor | Liberal | James E. B. Baillie | Conservative | Resignation |
| Chorley | 7 June 1895 | Joseph Feilden | Conservative | Lord Balniel | Conservative | Death |
| Edinburgh West | 29 May 1895 | Viscount Wolmer | Liberal Unionist | Lewis McIver | Liberal Unionist | Succession to a peerage |
| Croydon | 24 May 1895 | Sidney Herbert | Conservative | Charles Ritchie | Conservative | Succession to a peerage |
| Warwick and Leamington | 23 May 1895 | Arthur Peel | Liberal Unionist | Alfred Lyttelton | Liberal Unionist | Elevation to the peerage |
| West Dorset | 14 May 1895 | Henry Richard Farquharson | Conservative | Robert Williams | Conservative | Death |
| Newington Walworth | 14 May 1895 | William Saunders | Liberal | Sir James Bailey | Conservative | Death |
| Leeds East | 30 April 1895 | John Lawrence Gane | Liberal | Thomas Richmond Leuty | Liberal | Death |
| East Wicklow | 26 April 1895 | John Sweetman | Irish National Federation | Edward Peter O'Kelly | Irish National Federation | Seeks re-election upon becoming a Parnellite Nationalist |
| Mid Norfolk | 23 April 1895 | Clement Higgins | Liberal Unionist | Robert Gurdon | Liberal Unionist | Resignation |
| Oxford | 20 April 1895 | Sir George Chesney | Conservative | Viscount Valentia | Conservative | Death |
| Bristol East | 21 March 1895 | Sir Joseph Dodge Weston | Liberal | Sir William Henry Wills | Liberal | Death |
| Colchester | 19 February 1895 | Herbert Naylor-Leyland | Conservative | Weetman Pearson | Liberal | Resignation |
| Paddington South | 9 February 1895 | Lord Randolph Churchill | Conservative | George Fardell | Conservative | Death |
| Evesham | 22 January 1895 | Sir Edmund Lechmere | Conservative | Charles Wigram Long | Conservative | Death |
| Brigg (Note: Gain not retained at the 1895 UK general election.) | 7 December 1894 | Samuel Danks Waddy | Liberal | John Maunsell Richardson | Conservative | Resignation (Recorder of Sheffield) |
| Forfarshire | 17 November 1894 | Sir John Rigby | Liberal | Charles Maule Ramsay | Conservative | Resignation (Lord Justice of Appeal) |
| York | 14 November 1894 | Frank Lockwood | Liberal | Frank Lockwood | Liberal | Solicitor General for England and Wales |
| Sutherland | 26 October 1894 | Angus Sutherland | Liberal | John MacLeod | Liberal | Resignation (Chairman of the Fishery Board for Scotland) |
| Birkenhead | 17 October 1894 | Viscount Bury | Conservative | Elliott Lees | Conservative | Succession to a peerage |
| South Kilkenny | 7 September 1894 | Patrick Chance | Irish National Federation | Samuel Morris | Irish National Federation | Resignation |
| Leicester | 29 August 1894 | Sir James Whitehead | Liberal | Henry Broadhurst | Lib-Lab | Resignation |
| Leicester | 29 August 1894 | James Allanson Picton | Liberal | Walter Hazell | Liberal | Resignation |
| Chichester | 16 August 1894 | Lord Walter Gordon-Lennox | Conservative | Lord Edmund Bernard Talbot | Conservative | Resignation |
| Sheffield Attercliffe | 5 July 1894 | Bernard John Seymour Coleridge | Liberal | J. Batty Langley | Liberal | Succession to a peerage |
| Dumfries Burghs | 7 May 1894 | Robert Reid | Liberal | Robert Reid | Liberal | Solicitor General for England and Wales |
| Hackney South | 7 May 1894 | Sir Charles Russell | Liberal | John Fletcher Moulton | Liberal | Resignation |
| Mid Lanarkshire | 5 April 1894 | John Philipps | Liberal | James Caldwell | Liberal | Resignation |
| Wisbech | 3 April 1894 | Arthur Brand | Liberal | Arthur Brand | Liberal | Treasurer of the Household |
| Romford | 2 April 1894 | James Theobald | Conservative | Alfred Money-Wigram | Conservative | Death |
| Berwickshire | 29 March 1894 | Edward Marjoribanks | Liberal | Harold Tennant | Liberal | Succession to a peerage |
| Montgomeryshire | 29 March 1894 | Stuart Rendel | Liberal | Arthur Humphreys-Owen | Liberal | Elevation to the peerage |
| Hawick Burghs | 27 March 1894 | Thomas Shaw | Liberal | Thomas Shaw | Liberal | Solicitor General for Scotland |
| Leith Burghs | 26 March 1894 | Ronald Munro-Ferguson | Liberal | Ronald Munro-Ferguson | Liberal | Lord Commissioner of the Treasury |
| Leeds West | 16 March 1894 | Herbert Gladstone | Liberal | Herbert Gladstone | Liberal | First Commissioner of Works |
| Horncastle | 11 January 1894 | Edward Stanhope | Conservative | Lord Willoughby de Eresby | Conservative | Death |
| Accrington | 21 December 1893 | Joseph Leese | Liberal | Joseph Leese | Liberal | Recorder of Manchester |
| Brighton | 14 December 1893 | Sir William Thackeray Marriott | Conservative | Bruce Canning Vernon-Wentworth | Conservative | Resignation |
| South Wexford | 30 November 1893 | John Barry | Irish National Federation | Peter Ffrench | Irish National Federation | Resignation |
| Hereford | 15 August 1893 | William Grenfell | Liberal | Charles Cooke | Conservative | Resignation |
| West Mayo | 8 August 1893 | John Deasy | Irish National Federation | Robert Ambrose | Irish National Federation | Resignation |
| Cardiganshire | 4 July 1893 | William Bowen Rowlands | Liberal | William Bowen Rowlands | Liberal | Recorder of Swansea |
| South East Cork | 28 June 1893 | John Morrogh | Irish National Federation | Andrew Commins | Irish National Federation | Resignation |
| North East Cork | 28 June 1893 | Michael Davitt | Irish National Federation | William Abraham | Irish National Federation | Resignation |
| Pontefract | 26 June 1893 | Harold Reckitt | Liberal | Sir Willans Nussey | Liberal | Void election |
| Swansea District | 19 June 1893 | Sir Henry Vivian | Liberal | William Williams | Liberal | Elevation to the peerage |
| Linlithgowshire | 15 June 1893 | Peter McLagan | Liberal | Thomas Hope | Conservative | Resignation |
| Banffshire | 15 March 1893 | Robert Duff | Liberal | Sir William Wedderburn | Liberal | Resignation |
| Great Grimsby | 6 March 1893 | Henri Josse | Liberal | Edward Heneage | Liberal Unionist | Resignation |
| Mid Tipperary | 24 February 1893 | John McCarthy | Irish National Federation | James Francis Hogan | Irish National Federation | Death |
| Horsham | 24 February 1893 | Sir Walter Barttelot | Conservative | John Heywood Johnstone | Conservative | Death |
| Gateshead | 24 February 1893 | Walter Henry James | Liberal | William Allan | Liberal | Succession to a peerage |
| Cirencester (Note: Cirencester was won by the Liberal Party at the 1892 general election, by the Conservative Party at the 1892 Cirencester by-election, by the Liberal Party at the 1893 Cirencester by-election, and by the Conservative Party at the 1895 general election.) | 23 February 1893 | Thomas Chester-Master | Conservative | Harry Lawson Webster Lawson | Liberal | Void election |
| Stockport | 22 February 1893 | Louis John Jennings | Conservative | George Whiteley | Conservative | Death |
| North Meath | 21 February 1893 | Michael Davitt | Irish National Federation | James Gibney | Irish National Federation | Election declared void |
| South Meath | 17 February 1893 | Patrick Fulham | Irish National Federation | Jeremiah Jordan | Irish National Federation | Election declared void |
| Hexham | 17 February 1893 | Nathaniel George Clayton | Conservative | Miles MacInnes | Liberal | Void election |
| Pontefract | 13 February 1893 | Rowland Winn | Conservative | Harold Reckitt | Liberal | Succession to a peerage |
| Walsall | 9 February 1893 | Frank James | Conservative | Sir Arthur Divett Hayter | Liberal | Void election |
| Halifax | 9 February 1893 | Thomas Shaw | Liberal | William Rawson Shaw | Liberal | Death |
| North East Cork | 8 February 1893 | William O'Brien | Irish National Federation | Michael Davitt | Irish National Federation | Sat for Cork City |
| Rochester | 8 February 1893 | Horatio Davies | Conservative | Viscount Cranborne | Conservative | Void election |
| Burnley | 6 February 1893 | Jabez Balfour | Liberal | Philip Stanhope | Liberal | Resignation |
| Huddersfield | 4 February 1893 | William Summers | Liberal | Sir Joseph Crosland | Conservative | Death |
| Liverpool West Derby | 10 January 1893 | William Henry Cross | Conservative | Walter Hume Long | Conservative | Death |
| East Aberdeenshire | 10 December 1892 | Peter Esslemont | Liberal | Thomas Buchanan | Liberal | Resignation (Chairman of the Fishery Board for Scotland) |
| Cirencester | 13 October 1892 | Arthur Winterbotham | Liberal | Thomas Chester-Master | Conservative | Death |
| Luton | 29 September 1892 | Cyril Flower | Liberal | Samuel Whitbread | Liberal | Elevation to the peerage |
| Leeds South | 22 September 1892 | Sir Lyon Playfair | Liberal | John Lawson Walton | Liberal | Elevation to the peerage |
| Saffron Walden | 19 September 1892 | Herbert Gardner | Liberal | Herbert Gardner | Liberal | President of the Board of Agriculture |
| Dundee | 9 September 1892 | Edmund Robertson | Liberal | Edmund Robertson | Liberal | Civil Lord of the Admiralty |
| Merionethshire | 26 August 1892 | T. E. Ellis | Liberal | T. E. Ellis | Liberal | Lord Commissioner of the Treasury |
| East Fife | 25 August 1892 | H. H. Asquith | Liberal | H. H. Asquith | Liberal | Secretary of State for the Home Department |
| Clackmannanshire and Kinross-shire | 25 August 1892 | John Balfour | Liberal | John Balfour | Liberal | Lord Advocate |
| Stirling Burghs | 25 August 1892 | Henry Campbell-Bannerman | Liberal | Henry Campbell-Bannerman | Liberal | Secretary of State for War |
| Elgin Burghs | 25 August 1892 | Alexander Asher | Liberal | Alexander Asher | Liberal | Solicitor General for Scotland |
| Newcastle-upon-Tyne | 25 August 1892 | John Morley | Liberal | John Morley | Liberal | Chief Secretary for Ireland |
| Rotherham | 25 August 1892 | Arthur Dyke Acland | Liberal | Arthur Dyke Acland | Liberal | Vice President of the Committee of Council on Education |
| Forfarshire | 24 August 1892 | John Rigby | Liberal | John Rigby | Liberal | Solicitor General for England and Wales |
| Midlothian (or Edinburghshire) | 24 August 1892 | William Ewart Gladstone | Liberal | William Ewart Gladstone | Liberal | Prime Minister, First Lord of the Treasury, Lord Privy Seal |
| Glasgow Bridgeton | 24 August 1892 | Sir George Trevelyan | Liberal | Sir George Trevelyan | Liberal | Secretary for Scotland |
| Mid Northamptonshire | 24 August 1892 | Charles Spencer | Liberal | Charles Spencer | Liberal | Vice-Chamberlain of the Household |
| Nottingham East | 24 August 1892 | Arnold Morley | Liberal | Arnold Morley | Liberal | Postmaster General |
| Derby | 24 August 1892 | Sir William Vernon Harcourt | Liberal | Sir William Vernon Harcourt | Liberal | Chancellor of the Exchequer |
| Aberdeen South | 23 August 1892 | James Bryce | Liberal | James Bryce | Liberal | Chancellor of the Duchy of Lancaster |
| St Austell | 23 August 1892 | William Alexander McArthur | Liberal | William Alexander McArthur | Liberal | Lord Commissioner of the Treasury |
| Wolverhampton East | 23 August 1892 | Henry Fowler | Liberal | Henry Fowler | Liberal | President of the Local Government Board |
| Stoke-upon-Trent | 23 August 1892 | George Leveson-Gower | Liberal | George Leveson-Gower | Liberal | Comptroller of the Household |
| Sheffield Brightside | 23 August 1892 | A. J. Mundella | Liberal | A. J. Mundella | Liberal | President of the Board of Trade |
| Bury St Edmunds | 23 August 1892 | Lord Francis Hervey | Conservative | Viscount Chelsea | Conservative | Resignation (Civil Service Commissioner) |
| Bradford Central | 23 August 1892 | George Shaw-Lefevre | Liberal | George Shaw-Lefevre | Liberal | First Commissioner of Works |
| Southwark West | 23 August 1892 | Richard Knight Causton | Liberal | Richard Knight Causton | Liberal | Lord Commissioner of the Treasury |
| Hackney South | 23 August 1892 | Sir Charles Russell | Liberal | Sir Charles Russell | Liberal | Attorney General for England and Wales |
| Holborn | 12 August 1892 | Gainsford Bruce | Conservative | Sir Charles Hall | Conservative | Resignation (High Court Judge) |
=== 24th Parliament (1886–1892) ===
| By-election | Date | Incumbent | Party | Winner | Party | Cause |
| Hackney North | 11 May 1892 | Sir Lewis Pelly | Conservative | William Robert Bousfield | Conservative | Death |
| Chelmsford | 30 April 1892 (Note: An uncontested by-election.) | William Beadel | Conservative | Thomas Usborne | Conservative | Death |
| East Worcestershire | 30 March 1892 | George Hastings | Liberal Unionist | Austen Chamberlain | Liberal Unionist | Expelled after a criminal conviction |
| Kirkcaldy Burghs | 11 March 1892 | Sir George Campbell | Liberal | Henry Dalziel | Liberal | Death |
| North Wexford (Note: Gain retained at the 1892 UK general election.) | 11 March 1892 | John Redmond | Parnellite Nationalist | Thomas Joseph Healy | Irish National Federation | Resignation in order to contest Cork City |
| Belfast East | 9 March 1892 | Edward de Cobain | Irish Unionist | Gustav Wilhelm Wolff | Irish Unionist | Expelled after a criminal conviction |
| South Derbyshire | 4 March 1892 | Henry Wardle | Liberal | Harrington Evans Broad | Liberal | Death |
| Chertsey | 3 March 1892 | Frederick Hankey | Conservative | Charles Harvey Combe | Conservative | Death |
| Liverpool Everton | 15 February 1892 | Edward Whitley | Conservative | John Archibald Willox | Conservative | Death |
| Rossendale | 23 January 1892 | Marquess of Hartington | Liberal Unionist | John Maden | Liberal | Succession to a peerage |
| Waterford City | 23 December 1891 | Richard Power | Parnellite Nationalist | John Redmond | Parnellite Nationalist | Death |
| Mid Armagh | 17 December 1891 | Sir James Corry | Irish Unionist | Dunbar Barton | Irish Unionist | Death |
| Chichester | 9 December 1891 | Lord Walter Gordon-Lennox | Conservative | Lord Walter Gordon-Lennox | Conservative | Treasurer of the Household (Note: Seat vacated on appointment to the office noted.) (Note: Gain not retained at the 1892 UK general election.) |
| East Dorset | 27 November 1891 | George Hawkesworth Bond | Conservative | Humphrey Napier Sturt | Conservative | Death |
| Leeds North | 23 November 1891 | William Jackson | Conservative | William Jackson | Conservative | Chief Secretary for Ireland |
| South Molton | 13 November 1891 | Viscount Lymington | Liberal Unionist | George Lambert | Liberal | Succession to a peerage |
| Cork City | 6 November 1891 | Charles Stewart Parnell | Irish National League | Martin Flavin | Irish National Federation | Death |
| North Kilkenny | 29 October 1891 | Sir John Pope-Hennessy | Irish National Federation | Patrick McDermott | Irish National Federation | Death |
| Strand | 27 October 1891 | William Henry Smith | Conservative | Frederick Smith | Conservative | Death |
| Cambridge University | 9 October 1891 | Henry Cecil Raikes | Conservative | Sir Richard Claverhouse Jebb | Conservative | Death |
| Buteshire | 9 October 1891 | James Robertson | Conservative | Andrew Murray | Conservative | Resignation (Lord Justice General) |
| Manchester North East | 8 October 1891 | Sir James Fergusson | Conservative | Sir James Fergusson | Conservative | Postmaster General |
| Lewisham | 26 August 1891 | Viscount Lewisham | Conservative | John Penn | Conservative | Succession to a peerage |
| Walsall | 12 August 1891 | Sir Charles Forster | Liberal | Edward Thomas Holden | Liberal | Death |
| Wisbech | 23 July 1891 | Charles William Selwyn | Conservative | Arthur Brand | Liberal | Resignation |
| County Carlow | 7 July 1891 | James Patrick Mahon | Irish National Federation | John Hammond | Irish National Federation | Death |
| City of London | 3 June 1891 | Sir Robert Nicholas Fowler | Conservative | Sir Reginald Hanson | Conservative | Death |
| West Derbyshire | 2 June 1891 | Lord Edward Cavendish | Liberal Unionist | Victor Cavendish | Liberal Unionist | Death |
| Paisley | 1 June 1891 | William Boyle Barbour | Liberal | William Dunn | Liberal | Death |
| Buckingham | 28 May 1891 | Sir Edmund Verney | Liberal | Herbert Leon | Liberal | Expelled after a criminal conviction |
| Strand | 12 May 1891 | William Henry Smith | Conservative | William Henry Smith | Conservative | Lord Warden of the Cinque Ports |
| Harborough | 8 May 1891 | Thomas Tapling | Conservative | Paddy Logan | Liberal | Death |
| South Dorset | 7 May 1891 | Charles Joseph Theophilus Hambro | Conservative | William Ernest Brymer | Conservative | Death |
| Stowmarket | 5 May 1891 | Edward Greene | Conservative | Sydney Stern | Liberal | Death |
| Whitehaven | 24 April 1891 | George Cavendish-Bentinck | Conservative | Sir James Bain | Conservative | Death |
| Woodstock | 21 April 1891 | Francis William Maclean | Liberal Unionist | George Herbert Morrell | Conservative | Resignation (Master in Lunacy) |
| City of London | 18 April 1891 | Thomas Charles Baring | Conservative | Hucks Gibbs | Conservative | Death |
| North Sligo | 2 April 1891 | Peter McDonald | Parnellite Nationalist | Bernard Collery | Irish National Federation | Death |
| Aston Manor | 20 March 1891 | George Kynoch | Conservative | George William Grice-Hutchinson | Conservative | Death |
| Northampton | 12 February 1891 | Charles Bradlaugh | Liberal | Moses Philip Manfield | Liberal | Death |
| The Hartlepools | 21 January 1891 | Thomas Richardson | Liberal Unionist | Christopher Furness | Liberal | Death |
| North Kilkenny | 22 December 1890 | Edward Marum | Irish Parliamentary | Sir John Pope-Hennessy | Irish Parliamentary (Anti-Parnellite) | Death |
| Bassetlaw | 15 December 1890 | William Beckett-Denison | Conservative | Frederick Milner | Conservative | Death |
| Edinburgh and St Andrews Universities | 12 November 1890 | Moir Tod Stormonth Darling | Conservative | Sir Charles John Pearson | Conservative | Resignation (Senator of the College of Justice) |
| Eccles | 22 October 1890 | Alfred John Francis Egerton | Conservative | Henry John Roby | Liberal | Death |
| East Carmarthenshire | 8 August 1890 | David Pugh | Liberal | Abel Thomas | Liberal | Death |
| Mid Durham | 17 July 1890 | William Crawford | Lib-Lab | John Wilson | Lib-Lab | Death |
| Barrow-in-Furness | 2 July 1890 | William Sproston Caine | Liberal Unionist | James Duncan | Liberal | Resigned to restand as an Independent Liberal |
| North Donegal | 25 June 1890 | James Edward O'Doherty | Irish Parliamentary | James Rochfort Maguire | Irish Parliamentary | Resignation |
| West Donegal | 30 May 1890 | Patrick O'Hea | Irish Parliamentary | J. J. Dalton | Irish Parliamentary | Resignation |
| Mid Tipperary | 15 May 1890 | Thomas Mayne | Irish Parliamentary | Henry Harrison | Irish Parliamentary | Resignation |
| East Galway | 14 May 1890 | Matthew Harris | Irish Parliamentary | John Roche | Irish Parliamentary | Death |
| Bristol East | 9 May 1890 | Handel Cossham | Liberal | Joseph Dodge Weston | Liberal | Death |
| Caernarvon Boroughs | 10 April 1890 | Edward Swetenham | Conservative | David Lloyd George | Liberal | Death |
| Windsor | 2 April 1890 | Robert Richardson-Gardner | Conservative | Francis Tress Barry | Conservative | Resignation |
| West Cavan | 26 March 1890 | Joseph Biggar | Irish Parliamentary | Edmund Vesey Knox | Irish Parliamentary | Death |
| East Down | 25 March 1890 | Richard Ker | Irish Unionist | James Alexander Rentoul | Irish Unionist | Resignation |
| Ayr Burghs (Note: Ayr Burghs was won by the Liberal Unionist Party at the 1886 general election, by the Liberal Party at the 1888 Ayr Burghs by-election, by the Conservative Party at the 1890 Ayr Burghs by-election, and by the Liberal Party at the 1892 general election.) | 25 March 1890 | John Sinclair | Liberal | James Somervell | Conservative | Resignation |
| Stoke-upon-Trent | 14 March 1890 | William Leatham Bright | Liberal | George Leveson-Gower | Liberal | Resignation |
| Stamford | 7 March 1890 | John Lawrance | Conservative | Henry Cust | Conservative | Resignation (High Court Judge) |
| St Pancras North | 4 March 1890 | Charles Cochrane-Baillie | Conservative | Thomas Henry Bolton | Liberal | Succession to a peerage |
| West Waterford | 24 February 1890 | Jasper Douglas Pyne | Irish Parliamentary | Alfred Webb | Irish Parliamentary | Death |
| Mid Glamorganshire | 20 February 1890 | Christopher Rice Mansel Talbot | Liberal | Samuel Evans | Liberal | Death |
| Partick | 11 February 1890 | Alexander Craig Sellar | Liberal Unionist | James Parker Smith | Liberal Unionist | Death |
| Brighton | 25 October 1889 | Sir William Tindal Robertson | Conservative | Gerald Loder | Conservative | Death |
| Buckingham | 11 October 1889 | Egerton Hubbard | Conservative | Sir Edmund Verney | Liberal | Succession to a peerage |
| Elginshire and Nairnshire | 8 October 1889 | Charles Henry Anderson | Liberal | John Seymour Keay | Liberal | Death |
| Peterborough | 7 October 1889 | John Wentworth-FitzWilliam | Liberal Unionist | Alpheus Cleophas Morton | Liberal | Death |
| Sleaford | 26 September 1889 | Henry Chaplin | Conservative | Henry Chaplin | Conservative | President of the Board of Agriculture |
| Dundee | 25 September 1889 | Joseph Bottomley Firth | Liberal | John Leng | Liberal | Death |
| Belfast North | 12 August 1889 | Sir William Ewart | Irish Unionist | Edward Harland | Irish Unionist | Death |
| Marylebone East | 19 July 1889 | Lord Charles Beresford | Conservative | Edmund Boulnois | Conservative | Resignation |
| West Carmarthenshire | 17 July 1889 | W. R. H. Powell | Liberal | John Lloyd Morgan | Liberal | Death |
| Dover | 12 July 1889 | Alexander George Dickson | Conservative | George Wyndham | Conservative | Death |
| West Fife | 5 July 1889 | Robert Preston Bruce | Liberal | Augustine Birrell | Liberal | Resignation |
| South East Cork | 3 June 1889 | John Hooper | Irish Parliamentary | John Morrogh | Irish Parliamentary | Resignation |
| Rochester | 16 April 1889 | Francis Hughes-Hallett | Conservative | Edward Knatchbull-Hugessen | Liberal | Resignation |
| Birmingham Central | 15 April 1889 | John Bright | Liberal Unionist | John Albert Bright | Liberal Unionist | Death |
| Enfield | 30 March 1889 | Viscount Folkestone | Conservative | Henry Ferryman Bowles | Conservative | Succession to a peerage |
| Gorton | 22 March 1889 | Richard Peacock | Liberal | William Mather | Liberal | Death |
| Kennington | 15 March 1889 | Robert Gent-Davis | Conservative | Mark Hanbury Beaufoy | Liberal | Resignation |
| Barnsley | 11 March 1889 | Courtney Stanhope Kenny | Liberal | Earl Compton | Liberal | Resignation |
| Burnley | 27 February 1889 | John Slagg | Liberal | Jabez Balfour | Liberal | Resignation |
| East Perthshire | 19 February 1889 | Robert Stewart Menzies | Liberal | Sir John Kinloch | Liberal | Death |
| Govan | 18 January 1889 | Sir William Pearce | Conservative | John Wilson | Liberal | Death |
| Stockton-on-Tees | 21 December 1888 | Joseph Dodds | Liberal | Sir Horace Davey | Liberal | Resignation |
| Colchester | 18 December 1888 | Henry John Trotter | Conservative | Lord Brooke | Conservative | Death |
| Maidstone | 14 December 1888 | Alexander Henry Ross | Conservative | Fiennes Cornwallis | Conservative | Death |
| Holborn | 29 November 1888 | Francis Duncan | Conservative | Gainsford Bruce | Conservative | Death |
| Dewsbury | 16 November 1888 | Sir John Simon | Liberal | Mark Oldroyd | Liberal | Resignation |
| Edinburgh and St Andrews Universities | 6 November 1888 | John Macdonald | Conservative | Moir Tod Stormonth Darling | Conservative | Resignation (Lord Justice Clerk) |
| Merthyr Tydfil (Note: Seat retained by Tydfil at the 1892 general election for the Liberal Party.) | 26 October 1888 | Henry Richard | Liberal | William Pritchard Morgan | Independent Liberal | Death |
| Liverpool West Derby | 10 August 1888 | Lord Claud Hamilton | Conservative | William Cross | Conservative | Resignation |
| South Sligo | 6 July 1888 | Edward Joseph Kennedy | Irish Parliamentary | Edmund Leamy | Irish Parliamentary | Resignation |
| South Longford | 30 June 1888 | Laurence Connolly | Irish Parliamentary | James Gubbins Fitzgerald | Irish Parliamentary | Resignation |
| Isle of Thanet | 29 June 1888 | Edward King-Harman | Conservative | James Lowther | Conservative | Death |
| Ayr Burghs | 15 June 1888 | Richard Campbell | Liberal Unionist | John Sinclair | Liberal | Death |
| Southampton | 23 May 1888 | Sir John Commerell | Conservative | Francis Henry Evans | Liberal | Resignation |
| Dublin St Stephen's Green (Note: Dickson had been nominated by the Irish Parliamentary Party, though without signing the usual 'pledge' to vote with them.) | 12 May 1888 | Edmund Dwyer Gray | Irish Parliamentary | Thomas Alexander Dickson | Liberal | Death |
| Mid Lanarkshire | 27 April 1888 | Stephen Mason | Liberal | John Wynford Philipps | Liberal | Resignation |
| Limerick City | 17 April 1888 | Henry Joseph Gill | Irish Parliamentary | Francis Arthur O'Keefe | Irish Parliamentary | Resignation |
| Gower | 27 March 1888 | Frank Ash Yeo | Liberal | David Randell | Liberal | Death |
| Melton | 21 March 1888 | Lord John Manners | Conservative | Marquess of Granby | Conservative | Succession to a peerage |
| Merthyr Tydfil | 14 March 1888 | Charles James | Liberal | D. A. Thomas | Liberal | Resignation |
| Chichester | 14 March 1888 | Earl of March | Conservative | Lord Walter Gordon-Lennox | Conservative | Resignation |
| Deptford | 29 February 1888 | William Evelyn | Conservative | Charles Darling | Conservative | Resignation |
| Hampstead | 28 February 1888 | Sir Henry Holland | Conservative | Edward Brodie Hoare | Conservative | Elevation to the peerage |
| Doncaster | 23 February 1888 | Walter Shirley Shirley | Liberal | William Wentworth-Fitzwilliam | Liberal Unionist | Resignation |
| Bristol West | 20 February 1888 | Sir Michael Hicks Beach | Conservative | Sir Michael Hicks Beach | Conservative | President of the Board of Trade |
| Edinburgh West | 18 February 1888 | Thomas Buchanan | Liberal Unionist | Thomas Buchanan | Liberal | Resigned to restand as a Liberal |
| Southwark West | 17 February 1888 | Arthur Cohen | Liberal | Richard Causton | Liberal | Resignation |
| Dundee | 16 February 1888 | Charles Lacaita | Liberal | Joseph Bottomley Firth | Liberal | Resignation |
| Liverpool Walton | 3 February 1888 | John George Gibson | Conservative | Miles Walker Mattinson | Conservative | Resignation (Irish High Court Judge) |
| Dublin University | 3 February 1888 | Dodgson Hamilton Madden | Irish Unionist | Dodgson Hamilton Madden | Irish Unionist | Solicitor General for Ireland |
| Winchester | 5 January 1888 | Arthur Loftus Tottenham | Conservative | Richard Moss | Conservative | Death |
| Dulwich | 1 December 1887 | John Morgan Howard | Conservative | John Blundell Maple | Conservative | Resignation (County Court Judge) |
| Cambridge University | 17 November 1887 | Alexander Beresford Hope | Conservative | Sir George Stokes | Conservative | Death |
| South Kerry | 27 September 1887 | John O'Connor | Irish Parliamentary | Denis Kilbride | Irish Parliamentary | Resignation |
| Ramsey | 30 August 1887 | William Fellowes | Conservative | Ailwyn Fellowes | Conservative | Elevation to the peerage |
| County Carlow | 24 August 1887 | John Aloysius Blake | Irish Parliamentary | James Patrick Mahon | Irish Parliamentary | Death |
| Northwich | 13 August 1887 | Robert Verdin | Liberal Unionist | John Tomlinson Brunner | Liberal | Death |
| Glasgow Bridgeton | 2 August 1887 | Sir Edward Richard Russell | Liberal | Sir George Trevelyan | Liberal | Resignation |
| Forest of Dean | 29 July 1887 | Thomas Blake | Liberal | Godfrey Samuelson | Liberal | Resignation |
| City of London | 27 July 1887 | John Hubbard | Conservative | Thomas Charles Baring | Conservative | Elevation to the peerage |
| Hornsey | 19 July 1887 | Sir James McGarel-Hogg | Conservative | Henry Stephens | Conservative | Elevation to the peerage |
| Brixton | 19 July 1887 | Ernest Baggallay | Conservative | Marquess of Carmarthen | Conservative | Resignation |
| Basingstoke | 18 July 1887 | George Sclater-Booth | Conservative | Arthur Frederick Jeffreys | Conservative | Elevation to the peerage |
| Dublin University | 12 July 1887 | Hugh Holmes | Irish Unionist | Dodgson Hamilton Madden | Irish Unionist | Resignation (Irish High Court Judge) |
| St Ives | 9 July 1887 | Sir John St Aubyn | Liberal Unionist | Thomas Bedford Bolitho | Liberal Unionist | Elevation to the peerage |
| Coventry | 9 July 1887 | Henry Eaton | Conservative | William Ballantine | Liberal | Elevation to the peerage |
| Paddington North | 8 July 1887 | Lionel Cohen | Conservative | John Aird | Conservative | Death |
| Spalding | 1 July 1887 | Murray Finch-Hatton | Conservative | Halley Stewart | Liberal | Succession to a peerage |
| St Austell | 18 May 1887 | William Copeland Borlase | Liberal | William Alexander McArthur | Liberal | Resignation |
| North East Cork | 16 May 1887 | Edmund Leamy | Irish Parliamentary | William O'Brien | Irish Parliamentary | Resignation |
| Taunton | 23 April 1887 | Samuel Charles Allsopp | Conservative | Alfred Percy Allsopp | Conservative | Succession to a peerage |
| Ilkeston | 24 March 1887 | Thomas Watson | Liberal | Sir Balthazar Walter Foster | Liberal | Death |
| Burnley | 19 February 1887 | Peter Rylands | Liberal Unionist | John Slagg | Liberal | Death |
| North Antrim | 11 February 1887 | Edward Macnaghten | Irish Unionist | Sir Charles Edward Lewis | Irish Unionist | Resignation (Lord of Appeal in Ordinary) |
| St George's Hanover Square | 9 February 1887 | Lord Algernon Percy | Conservative | George Goschen | Liberal Unionist | Resignation |
| South Sligo | 7 February 1887 | Thomas Sexton | Irish Parliamentary | Edward Joseph Kennedy | Irish Parliamentary | Sat for Belfast West |
| North Longford | 5 February 1887 | Justin McCarthy | Irish Parliamentary | Tim Healy | Irish Parliamentary | Sat for Londonderry City |
| Dartford | 2 February 1887 | Sir William Hart Dyke | Conservative | Sir William Hart Dyke | Conservative | Vice President of the Committee of Council on Education |
| South Donegal | 2 February 1887 | Bernard Kelly | Irish Parliamentary | J. G. Swift MacNeill | Irish Parliamentary | Death |
| Liverpool Exchange | 26 January 1887 | David Duncan | Liberal | Ralph Neville | Liberal | Death |
| Brentford | 23 December 1886 | Octavius Edward Coope | Conservative | James Bigwood | Conservative | Death |
| Brighton | 29 November 1886 | David Smith | Conservative | William Tindal Robertson | Conservative | Death |
| King's Lynn | 25 August 1886 | Robert Bourke | Conservative | Weston Jarvis | Conservative | Resignation (Governor of Madras |
| Leith Burghs | 20 August 1886 | William Ewart Gladstone | Liberal | Ronald Munro Ferguson | Liberal | Sat for Midlothian (or Edinburghshire) |
| Burton | 20 August 1886 | Sir Michael Bass | Liberal | Sydney Evershed | Liberal | Elevation to the peerage |
| Blackpool | 20 August 1886 | Sir Frederick Stanley | Conservative | Sir Matthew Ridley | Conservative | President of the Board of Trade and elevation to the peerage |
| North Northamptonshire | 16 August 1886 | Lord Burghley | Conservative | Lord Burghley | Conservative | Parliamentary Groom in Waiting |
| Newton | 16 August 1886 | Richard Assheton Cross | Conservative | Thomas Legh | Conservative | Secretary of State for India and elevation to the peerage |
| Edinburgh and St Andrews Universities | 13 August 1886 | John Macdonald | Conservative | John Macdonald | Conservative | Lord Advocate |
| Cambridge University | 13 August 1886 | Henry Cecil Raikes | Conservative | Henry Cecil Raikes | Conservative | Postmaster General |
| Melton | 13 August 1886 | Lord John Manners | Conservative | Lord John Manners | Conservative | Chancellor of the Duchy of Lancaster |
| Dublin University | 13 August 1886 | David Robert Plunket | Irish Unionist | David Robert Plunket | Irish Unionist | First Commissioner of Works |
| Dublin University | 13 August 1886 | Hugh Holmes | Irish Unionist | Hugh Holmes | Irish Unionist | Attorney General for Ireland |
| West Down | 13 August 1886 | Lord Arthur Hill | Irish Unionist | Lord Arthur Hill | Irish Unionist | Comptroller of the Household |
| Wigtownshire | 12 August 1886 | Sir Herbert Maxwell | Conservative | Sir Herbert Maxwell | Conservative | Lord Commissioner of the Treasury |
| Buteshire | 12 August 1886 | James Robertson | Conservative | James Robertson | Conservative | Solicitor General for Scotland |
| Enfield | 12 August 1886 | Viscount Folkestone | Conservative | Viscount Folkestone | Conservative | Treasurer of the Household |
| Ealing | 12 August 1886 | Lord George Hamilton | Conservative | Lord George Hamilton | Conservative | First Lord of the Admiralty |
| Horncastle | 12 August 1886 | Edward Stanhope | Conservative | Edward Stanhope | Conservative | Secretary of State for the Colonies |
| Isle of Wight | 12 August 1886 | Sir Richard Webster | Conservative | Sir Richard Webster | Conservative | Attorney General for England and Wales |
| Tiverton | 12 August 1886 | William Walrond | Conservative | William Walrond | Conservative | Lord Commissioner of the Treasury |
| St George's, Tower Hamlets | 12 August 1886 | Charles Ritchie | Conservative | Charles Ritchie | Conservative | President of the Local Government Board |
| Sheffield Ecclesall | 11 August 1886 | Ellis Ashmead-Bartlett | Conservative | Ellis Ashmead-Bartlett | Conservative | Civil Lord of the Admiralty |
| Plymouth | 11 August 1886 | Edward Clarke | Conservative | Edward Clarke | Conservative | Solicitor General for England and Wales |
| Manchester East | 11 August 1886 | Arthur Balfour | Conservative | Arthur Balfour | Conservative | Secretary for Scotland |
| Liverpool Walton | 11 August 1886 | John George Gibson | Conservative | John George Gibson | Conservative | Solicitor General for Ireland |
| Croydon | 11 August 1886 | Sidney Herbert | Conservative | Sidney Herbert | Conservative | Lord Commissioner of the Treasury |
| Bristol West | 11 August 1886 | Sir Michael Hicks Beach | Conservative | Sir Michael Hicks Beach | Conservative | Chief Secretary for Ireland |
| Brighton | 11 August 1886 | William Thackeray Marriott | Conservative | William Thackeray Marriott | Conservative | Judge Advocate General |
| Birmingham East | 11 August 1886 | Henry Matthews | Conservative | Henry Matthews | Conservative | Secretary of State for the Home Department |
| Strand | 11 August 1886 | William Henry Smith | Conservative | William Henry Smith | Conservative | Secretary of State for War |
| Paddington South | 11 August 1886 | Lord Randolph Churchill | Conservative | Lord Randolph Churchill | Conservative | Chancellor of the Exchequer |
| Marylebone East | 11 August 1886 | Lord Charles Beresford | Conservative | Lord Charles Beresford | Conservative | Junior Naval Lord |
| Lewisham | 11 August 1886 | Viscount Lewisham | Conservative | Viscount Lewisham | Conservative | Vice-Chamberlain of the Household |
| Hampstead | 11 August 1886 | Sir Henry Holland | Conservative | Sir Henry Holland | Conservative | Vice President of the Committee of Council on Education |
=== 23rd Parliament (1885–1886) ===
| By-election | Date | Incumbent | Party | Winner | Party | Cause |
| Bradford Central | 21 April 1886 | William Edward Forster | Liberal | George Shaw-Lefevre | Liberal | Death |
| Clitheroe | 19 April 1886 (Note: An uncontested by-election.) | Ughtred Kay-Shuttleworth | Liberal | Ughtred Kay-Shuttleworth | Liberal | Chancellor of the Duchy of Lancaster (Note: Seat vacated on appointment to the office noted.) |
| Ipswich (Note: Gain retained at the 1886 UK general election.) | 14 April 1886 | Henry Wyndham West | Liberal | Charles Dalrymple | Conservative | Void election |
| Ipswich | 14 April 1886 | Jesse Collings | Liberal | Lord Elcho | Conservative | Void election |
| Norwich | 7 April 1886 | Harry Bullard | Conservative | Samuel Hoare | Conservative | Void election |
| Barrow-in-Furness | 6 April 1886 | David Duncan | Liberal | William Sproston Caine | Liberal | Void Election |
| Halifax | 3 April 1886 | Sir James Stansfeld | Liberal | Sir James Stansfeld | Liberal | President of the Local Government Board |
| Altrincham | 26 March 1886 | John Brooks | Conservative | Sir William Cunliffe Brooks | Conservative | Death |
| Flintshire | 2 March 1886 | Lord Richard Grosvenor | Liberal | Samuel Smith | Liberal | Resignation |
| Battersea | 1 March 1886 | Octavius Vaughan Morgan | Liberal | Octavius Vaughan Morgan | Liberal | Sought re-election to pre-empt disqualification |
| Cardiff Boroughs | 27 February 1886 | Sir Edward James Reed | Liberal | Sir Edward James Reed | Liberal | Junior Lord of the Treasury |
| South Somerset | 24 February 1886 | Viscount Kilcoursie | Liberal | Viscount Kilcoursie | Liberal | Vice-Chamberlain of the Household |
| Grantham | 23 February 1886 | John William Mellor | Liberal | John William Mellor | Liberal | Judge Advocate General |
| Clackmannanshire and Kinross-shire | 13 February 1886 | John Balfour | Liberal | John Balfour | Liberal | Lord Advocate |
| Berwickshire | 13 February 1886 | Edward Marjoribanks | Liberal | Edward Marjoribanks | Liberal | Comptroller of the Household |
| Banffshire | 13 February 1886 | Robert Duff | Liberal | Robert Duff | Liberal | Civil Lord of the Admiralty |
| Luton | 13 February 1886 | Cyril Flower | Liberal | Cyril Flower | Liberal | Junior Lord of the Treasury |
| Great Grimsby | 13 February 1886 | Edward Heneage | Liberal | Edward Heneage | Liberal | Chancellor of the Duchy of Lancaster |
| Queen's County Ossory | 12 February 1886 | Arthur O'Connor | Irish Parliamentary | Stephen O'Mara | Irish Parliamentary | Sat for East Donegal |
| Elgin Burghs | 12 February 1886 | Alexander Asher | Liberal | Alexander Asher | Liberal | Solicitor General for Scotland |
| North West Staffordshire | 12 February 1886 | George Leveson-Gower | Liberal | George Leveson-Gower | Liberal | Junior Lord of the Treasury |
| Mid Northamptonshire | 12 February 1886 | Charles Spencer | Liberal | Charles Spencer | Liberal | Parliamentary Groom in Waiting |
| Newcastle-upon-Tyne | 12 February 1886 | John Morley | Liberal | John Morley | Liberal | Chief Secretary for Ireland |
| Leeds South | 12 February 1886 | Sir Lyon Playfair | Liberal | Sir Lyon Playfair | Liberal | Vice President of the Committee of Council on Education |
| Galway Borough | 11 February 1886 | T. P. O'Connor | Irish Parliamentary | William O'Shea (Note: The biographical article on William O'Shea suggests he was not a member of the Irish Parliamentary Party. However, Walker classifies O'Shea as a Nationalist candidate which, for someone standing at an election in 1886, implies membership of the Irish Parliamentary Party.) | Irish Parliamentary | Sat for Liverpool Scotland |
| Hackney South | 11 February 1886 | Charles Russell | Liberal | Charles Russell | Liberal | Attorney General for England and Wales |
| Hawick Burghs | 10 February 1886 | George Otto Trevelyan | Liberal | George Otto Trevelyan | Liberal | Secretary for Scotland |
| Midlothian | 10 February 1886 | William Ewart Gladstone | Liberal | William Ewart Gladstone | Liberal | Prime Minister, First Lord of the Treasury, Lord Privy Seal |
| North Monaghan | 10 February 1886 | Tim Healy | Irish Parliamentary | Patrick O'Brien | Irish Parliamentary | Sat for South Londonderry |
| Stirling Burghs | 10 February 1886 | Henry Campbell-Bannerman | Liberal | Henry Campbell-Bannerman | Liberal | Secretary of State for War |
| Birmingham West | 9 February 1886 | Joseph Chamberlain | Liberal | Joseph Chamberlain | Liberal | President of the Local Government Board |
| Derby | 9 February 1886 | Sir William Harcourt | Liberal | Sir William Harcourt | Liberal | Chancellor of the Exchequer |
| Edinburgh South | 9 February 1886 | Hugh Childers | Liberal | Hugh Childers | Liberal | Secretary of State for the Home Department |
| Sheffield Brightside | 9 February 1886 | A. J. Mundella | Liberal | A. J. Mundella | Liberal | President of the Board of Trade |
| Mid Armagh | 1 February 1886 | John McKane | Conservative | Sir James Corry | Conservative | Death |
| County Carlow | 29 January 1886 | Edmund Dwyer Gray | Irish Parliamentary | John Aloysius Blake | Irish Parliamentary | Sat for Dublin St Stephen's Green |
| Edinburgh South | 29 January 1886 | Sir George Harrison | Independent Liberal | Hugh Childers | Liberal | Death |
| Croydon | 27 January 1886 | William Grantham | Conservative | Sidney Herbert | Conservative | Resignation (High Court Judge) |

== Sources ==
- List of MPs since 1660
- Craig, F. W. S. (ed.). Chronology of British Parliamentary By-elections 1833–1987.
- Craig, F. W. S. (ed.). British Parliamentary Election Statistics 1832–1987.
- Craig, F. W. S. (ed.). British Parliamentary Election Results 1885–1918.
- Walker, B.M., ed. (1978). Parliamentary Election Results in Ireland, 1801–1922. Dublin: Royal Irish Academy. ISBN 0901714127.
