= List of MPs elected in the 1885 United Kingdom general election =

1885–1886 Parliament of the United Kingdom
←	1880–1885 Parliament	1886–1892 Parliament	→
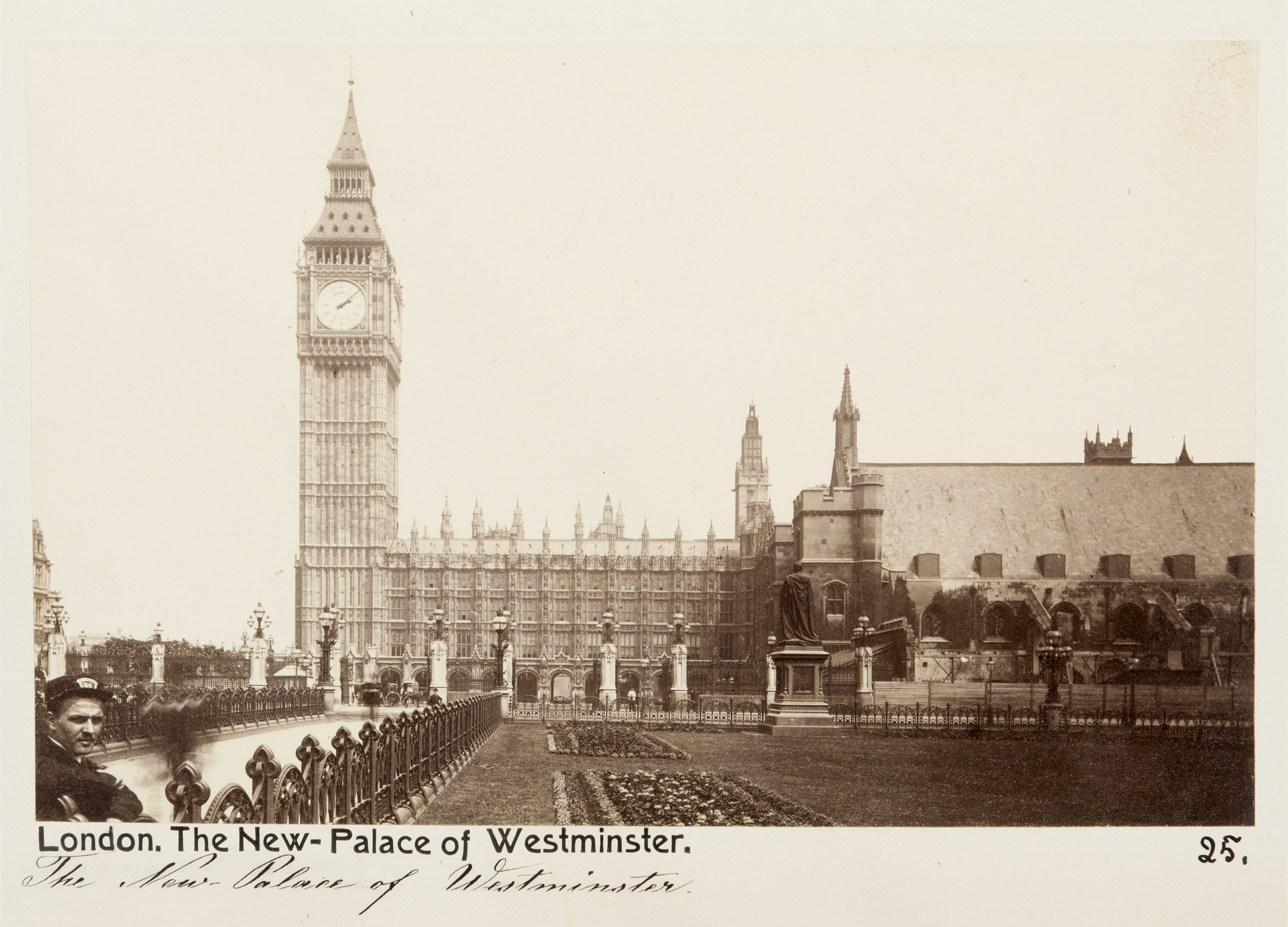
- The Palace of Westminster in 1886

Overview
- Legislative body: Parliament of the United Kingdom
- Jurisdiction: United Kingdom
- Meeting place: Palace of Westminster
- Term: 1 February 1886 – 20 July 1886
- Election: 1885 United Kingdom general election
- Government: Third Gladstone ministry

House of Commons
- Members: 670
- Speaker: Arthur Peel
- Leader: William Ewart Gladstone
- Prime Minister: William Ewart Gladstone
- Leader of the Opposition: Sir Michael Hicks Beach
- Third-party leader: Charles Stewart Parnell
- Party control: Liberal Party (minority)

House of Lords
- Lord Chancellor: Farrer Herschell, 1st Baron Herschell
- Leader: Granville Leveson-Gower, 2nd Earl Granville
- Leader of the Opposition: Marquess of Salisbury

Crown-in-Parliament Victoria

Sessions
- 1st: 12 January 1886 – 25 June 1886

This is a list of members of Parliament (MPs) elected in the 1885 general election, held over several days from 24 November 1885 to 18 December 1885.

Table of contents:

A B C D E F G H I J K L M N O P Q R S T U V W X Y Z By-elections Changes

Party	Seats
Liberal Party	319
Conservative Party	247
Irish Parliamentary Party	86
Independent Liberal	11
Crofters Party	4
Independent Conservative	1
Independent Lib-Lab	1

== A ==
Constituency	MP	Party
Aberdeen North	William Hunter	Liberal
Aberdeen South	James Bryce	Liberal
Aberdeenshire East	Peter Esslemont	Liberal
Aberdeenshire West	Robert Farquharson	Liberal
Abingdon	Philip Wroughton	Conservative
Accrington	Frederick William Grafton	Liberal
Altrincham	John Brooks	Conservative
Andover	William Wither Bramston Beach	Conservative
Anglesey	Richard Davies	Liberal
Antrim East	James McCalmont	Conservative
Antrim Mid	Hon. Robert Torrens O'Neill	Conservative
Antrim North	Edward Macnaghten	Conservative
Antrim South	William Ellison-Macartney	Conservative
Appleby	William Lowther	Conservative
Arfon	William Rathbone	Liberal
Argyllshire	Donald Horne Macfarlane	Crofters'
Armagh Mid	John McKane	Conservative
Armagh North	Edward James Saunderson	Conservative
Armagh South	Alexander Blane	Irish Parliamentary
Ashburton	Charles Seale-Hayne	Liberal
Ashford	William Pomfret	Conservative
Ashton-under-Lyne	John Addison	Conservative
Aston Manor	Hugh Gilzean-Reid	Liberal
Aylesbury	Ferdinand de Rothschild	Liberal
Ayr District of Burghs	Richard Campbell	Liberal
Ayrshire North	Hon. Hugh Elliot	Liberal
Ayrshire South	Eugene Wason	Liberal
== B ==
Banbury	Sir Bernhard Samuelson, Bt	Liberal
Banffshire	Robert Duff	Liberal
Barkston Ash	Robert Gunter	Conservative
Barnard Castle	Sir Joseph Pease, Bt	Liberal
Barnsley	Courtney Kenny	Liberal
Barnstaple	George Pitt-Lewis	Liberal
Barrow-in-Furness	David Duncan	Liberal
Basingstoke	George Sclater-Booth	Conservative
Bassetlaw	William Beckett-Denison	Conservative
Bath (Two members)	Edmond Wodehouse	Liberal
Bath (Two members)	Robert Stickney Blaine	Conservative
Battersea	Octavius Vaughan Morgan	Liberal
Bedford	Samuel Whitbread	Liberal
Belfast East	Edward de Cobain	Indep Conservative
Belfast North	William Ewart	Conservative
Belfast South	William Johnston	Indep Conservative
Belfast West	James Horner Haslett	Conservative
Bermondsey	Thorold Rogers	Liberal
Berwick-upon-Tweed	Sir Edward Grey, Bt	Liberal
Berwickshire	Hon. Edward Marjoribanks	Liberal
Bethnal Green North East	George Howell	Liberal-Labour
Bethnal Green South West	Edward Pickersgill	Liberal
Bewdley	Sir Edmund Lechmere, Bt	Conservative
Biggleswade	Charles Magniac	Liberal
Birkenhead	Sir Edward Bruce Hamley	Conservative
Birmingham Bordesley	Henry Broadhurst	Liberal-Labour
Birmingham Central	John Bright	Liberal
Birmingham East	William Cook	Liberal
Birmingham Edgbaston	George Dixon	Liberal
Birmingham North	William Kenrick	Liberal
Birmingham South	Joseph Powell-Williams	Liberal
Birmingham West	Joseph Chamberlain	Liberal
Birr	Bernard Molloy	Irish Parliamentary
Bishop Auckland	James Mellor Paulton	Liberal
Blackburn (Two members)	William Coddington	Conservative
Blackburn (Two members)	Sir Robert Peel, Bt	Conservative
Blackpool	Hon. Frederick Stanley	Conservative
Bodmin	Leonard Courtney	Liberal
Bolton (Two members)	Herbert Shepherd-Cross	Unionist
Bolton (Two members)	Hon. Francis Bridgeman	Unionist
Bootle	Thomas Sandys	Conservative
Boston	William Ingram	Liberal
Bosworth	James Ellis	Liberal
Bow and Bromley	William Robson	Liberal
Bradford Central	William Edward Forster	Liberal
Bradford East	Angus Holden	Liberal
Bradford West	Alfred Illingworth	Liberal
Brecknockshire	William Fuller-Maitland	Liberal
Brentford	Octavius Coope	Conservative
Bridgwater	Edward Stanley	Conservative
Brigg	Sir Henry Meysey-Thompson, Bt	Liberal
Brighton (Two members)	David Smith	Conservative
Brighton (Two members)	William Thackeray Marriott	Conservative
Bristol East	Handel Cossham	Liberal
Bristol North	Lewis Fry	Liberal
Bristol South	Joseph Dodge Weston	Liberal
Bristol West	Sir Michael Hicks Beach, Bt	Conservative
Brixton	Ernest Baggallay	Conservative
Buckingham	Edmund Verney	Liberal
Buckrose	Christopher Sykes	Conservative
Burnley	Peter Rylands	Liberal
Burton	Sir Michael Bass, Bt	Liberal
Bury	Sir Henry James	Liberal
Bury St Edmunds	Lord Francis Hervey	Conservative
Buteshire	James Robertson	Conservative
== C ==
Caithness-shire	Gavin Brown Clark	Crofters'
Camberwell North	Richard Strong	Liberal
Camborne	Charles Conybeare	Independent Liberal
Cambridge	Robert Uniacke-Penrose-Fitzgerald	Conservative
Cambridge University (Two members)	Henry Cecil Raikes	Conservative
Cambridge University (Two members)	Alexander Beresford Hope	Conservative
Canterbury	John Henniker Heaton	Conservative
Cardiff District	Sir Edward James Reed	Liberal
Cardiganshire	David Davies	Liberal
Carlisle	Robert Ferguson	Liberal
County Carlow	Edmund Dwyer Gray	Irish Parliamentary
Carmarthen District	John Jenkins	Liberal
Carmarthenshire East	David Pugh	Liberal
Carmarthenshire West	W. R. H. Powell	Liberal
Carnarvon	Love Jones-Parry	Liberal
Cavan East	Thomas O'Hanlon	Irish Parliamentary
Cavan West	Joseph Biggar	Irish Parliamentary
Chatham	Sir John Eldon Gorst	Conservative
Chelmsford	William Beadel	Conservative
Chelsea	Sir Charles Dilke, Bt	Liberal
Cheltenham	James Agg-Gardner	Conservative
Chertsey	Frederick Hankey	Conservative
Chester	Balthazar Foster	Liberal
Chester-le-Street	James Joicey	Liberal
Chesterfield	Alfred Barnes	Liberal
Chesterton	Sir Charles Hall	Conservative
Chichester	Charles Gordon-Lennox	Conservative
Chippenham	Banister Fletcher	Liberal
Chorley	Joseph Feilden	Conservative
Christchurch	Charles Young	Conservative
Cirencester	Arthur Winterbotham	Liberal
Clackmannan and Kinrossshire	John Balfour	Liberal
Clapham	John Fletcher Moulton	Liberal
Clare East	Joseph Cox	Irish Parliamentary
Clare West	Jeremiah Jordan	Irish Parliamentary
Cleveland	Henry Fell Pease	Liberal
Clitheroe	Sir Ughtred Kay-Shuttleworth, Bt	Liberal
Cockermouth	Charles James Valentine	Conservative
Colchester	Henry John Trotter	Conservative
Colne Valley	Henry Beaumont	Liberal
Cork City (Two members)	Charles Stewart Parnell	Irish Parliamentary
Cork City (Two members)	Maurice Healy	Irish Parliamentary
County Cork East	William John Lane	Irish Parliamentary
County Cork Mid	Charles Kearns Deane Tanner	Irish Parliamentary
County Cork North	James Christopher Flynn	Irish Parliamentary
County Cork North East	Edmund Leamy	Irish Parliamentary
County Cork South	J. E. Kenny	Irish Parliamentary
County Cork South East	John Hooper	Irish Parliamentary
County Cork West	James Gilhooly	Irish Parliamentary
Coventry	Henry Eaton	Conservative
Crewe	George William Latham	Liberal
Cricklade	Nevil Story Maskelyne	Liberal
Croydon	William Grantham	Conservative
== D ==
Darlington	Theodore Fry	Liberal
Dartford	Sir William Hart Dyke, Bt	Conservative
Darwen	Viscount Cranborne	Conservative
Denbigh District	George Thomas Kenyon	Conservative
Denbighshire East	George Osborne Morgan	Liberal
Denbighshire West	William Cornwallis-West	Liberal
Deptford	William Evelyn	Conservative
Derby (Two members)	Thomas Roe	Liberal
Derby (Two members)	Sir William Vernon Harcourt	Liberal
Derbyshire Mid	Sir James Alfred Jacoby	Liberal
Derbyshire North East	Hon. Francis Egerton	Liberal
Derbyshire South	Henry Wardle	Liberal
Derbyshire West	Lord Edward Cavendish	Liberal
Devizes	Walter Long	Conservative
Devonport (Two members)	Sir John Henry Puleston	Conservative
Devonport (Two members)	George Edward Price	Conservative
Dewsbury	John Simon	Liberal
Doncaster	Walter Shirley Shirley	Liberal
Donegal East	Arthur O'Connor	Irish Parliamentary
Donegal North	James Edward O'Doherty	Irish Parliamentary
Donegal South	Bernard Kelly	Irish Parliamentary
Donegal West	Patrick O'Hea	Irish Parliamentary
Dorset East	Hon. Pascoe Glyn	Liberal
Dorset North	Edwin Berkeley Portman	Liberal
Dorset South	Henry Parkman Sturgis	Liberal
Dorset West	Henry Richard Farquharson	Conservative
Dover	Alexander George Dickson	Conservative
Down East	Richard Ker	Conservative
Down North	Thomas Waring	Conservative
Down South	John Francis Small	Irish Parliamentary
Down West	Lord Arthur Hill	Conservative
Droitwich	John Corbett	Liberal
Dublin County North	J. J. Clancy	Irish Parliamentary
Dublin County South	Sir Thomas Esmonde, Bt	Irish Parliamentary
Dublin College Green	Timothy Daniel Sullivan	Irish Parliamentary
Dublin Harbour	Timothy Harrington	Irish Parliamentary
Dublin St Patrick's	William Martin Murphy	Irish Parliamentary
Dublin St Stephen's Green	Edmund Dwyer Gray	Irish Parliamentary
Dublin University (Two members)	Hugh Holmes	Conservative
Dublin University (Two members)	Hon. David Plunket	Conservative
Dudley	Henry Brinsley Sheridan	Liberal
Dulwich	John Morgan Howard	Conservative
Dumbartonshire	Archibald Orr-Ewing	Conservative
Dumfries District of Burghs	Ernest Noel	Liberal
Dumfriesshire	Sir Robert Jardine	Liberal
Dundee (Two members)	Charles Lacaita	Liberal
Dundee (Two members)	Edmund Robertson	Liberal
Durham	Thomas Milvain	Conservative
Durham Mid	William Crawford	Liberal-Labour
Durham North West	Llewellyn Atherley-Jones	Liberal
Durham South East	Sir Henry Havelock-Allan, Bt	Liberal
== E ==
Ealing	Lord George Hamilton	Conservative
East Grinstead	George Burrow Gregory	Conservative
Eastbourne	Edward Field	Conservative
Eccles	Hon. Alfred Egerton	Conservative
Eddisbury	Henry James Tollemache	Conservative
Edinburgh Central	John Wilson	Independent Liberal
Edinburgh East	George Goschen	Independent Liberal
Edinburgh South	Sir George Harrison	Independent Liberal
Edinburgh West	Thomas Buchanan	Liberal
Edinburgh and St Andrews Universities	John Macdonald	Conservative
Egremont	The Lord Muncaster	Conservative
Eifion	John Bryn Roberts	Liberal
Elgin District of Burghs	Alexander Asher	Liberal
Elgin and Nairnshire	Sir George Macpherson-Grant, Bt	Liberal
Elland	Thomas Wayman	Liberal
Enfield	Viscount Folkestone	Conservative
Epping	Sir Henry Selwin-Ibbetson, Bt	Conservative
Epsom	George Cubitt	Conservative
Eskdale	Robert Andrew Allison	Liberal
Essex South East	William Makins	Conservative
Evesham	Sir Richard Temple, Bt	Conservative
Exeter	Hon. Henry Northcote	Conservative
Eye	Francis Seymour Stevenson	Liberal
== F ==
Falkirk District of Burghs	John Ramsay	Liberal
Fareham	Sir Frederick Fitzwygram, Bt	Conservative
Faversham	Herbert Knatchbull-Hugessen	Conservative
Fermanagh North	Willie Redmond	Irish Parliamentary
Fermanagh South	Henry Campbell	Irish Parliamentary
Fife East	John Boyd Kinnear	Liberal
Fife West	Hon. Robert Preston Bruce	Liberal
Finsbury Central	Howard Spensley	Liberal
Finsbury East	James Bigwood	Conservative
Flint District	John Roberts	Liberal
Flintshire	Richard Grosvenor	Liberal
Forest of Dean	Thomas Blake	Liberal
Forfarshire	James William Barclay	Liberal
Frome	Lawrence James Baker	Liberal
Fulham	William Hayes Fisher	Conservative
== G ==
Gainsborough	Joseph Bennett	Liberal
Galway Borough	T. P. O'Connor	Irish Parliamentary
Galway Connemara	Patrick James Foley	Irish Parliamentary
Galway East	Matthew Harris	Irish Parliamentary
Galway North	John Philip Nolan	Irish Parliamentary
Galway South	David Sheehy	Irish Parliamentary
Gateshead	Hon. Walter James	Liberal
Glamorganshire, East	Alfred Thomas	Liberal
Glamorganshire, Mid	Christopher Rice Mansel Talbot	Liberal
Glamorganshire, South	Arthur John Williams	Liberal
Glasgow and Aberdeen Universities	James Alexander Campbell	Conservative
Glasgow Blackfriars and Hutchesontown	Mitchell Henry	Liberal
Glasgow Bridgeton	Edward Russell	Liberal
Glasgow Camlachie	Hugh Watt	Liberal
Glasgow Central	Gilbert Beith	Liberal
Glasgow College	Charles Cameron	Liberal
Glasgow St Rollox	John McCulloch	Liberal
Glasgow Tradeston	Archibald Corbett	Liberal
Gloucester	Thomas Robinson	Liberal
Gorton	Richard Peacock	Liberal
Govan	William Pearce	Conservative
Gower District	Frank Ash Yeo	Liberal
Grantham	John William Mellor	Liberal
Gravesend	John Bazley White	Conservative
Great Grimsby	Edward Heneage	Liberal
Great Yarmouth	Sir Henry Tyler	Conservative
Greenock	Thomas Sutherland	Liberal
Greenwich	Thomas Boord	Conservative
Guildford	Hon. St John Brodrick	Conservative
== H ==
Hackney Central	Sir William Guyer Hunter	Conservative
Hackney North	Sir Lewis Pelly	Conservative
Hackney South	Sir Charles Russell	Liberal
Haddingtonshire	Richard Haldane	Liberal
Haggerston	Randal Cremer	Liberal-Labour
Halifax (Two members)	Sir James Stansfeld	Liberal
Halifax (Two members)	Thomas Shaw	Liberal
Hallamshire	Frederick Mappin	Liberal
Hammersmith	Walter Tuckfield Goldsworthy	Conservative
Hampstead	Sir Henry Holland, Bt	Conservative
Handsworth	Henry Wiggin	Liberal
Hanley	William Woodall	Liberal
Harborough	Thomas Paget	Liberal
Harrow	William Ambrose	Conservative
Hartlepools, The	Thomas Richardson	Liberal
Harwich	James Round	Conservative
Hastings	Thomas Brassey	Liberal
Hawick District of Burghs	George Trevelyan	Liberal
Henley	Edward Vernon Harcourt	Conservative
Hereford	Joseph Pulley	Liberal
Hertford	Abel Smith	Conservative
Hexham	Miles MacInnes	Liberal
Heywood	Isaac Hoyle	Liberal
High Peak	William Sidebottom	Conservative
Hitchin	Robert Dimsdale	Conservative
Holborn	Francis Duncan	Conservative
Holderness	George Bethell	Conservative
Holmfirth	Henry Wilson	Liberal
Honiton	Sir John Kennaway, Bt	Conservative
Horncastle	Hon. Edward Stanhope	Conservative
Hornsey	Sir James McGarel-Hogg, Bt	Conservative
Horsham	Sir Walter Barttelot, Bt	Conservative
Houghton-le-Spring	John Wilson	Liberal-Labour
Howdenshire	Arthur Duncombe	Conservative
Hoxton	James Stuart	Liberal
Huddersfield	Edward Leatham	Liberal
Huntingdon	Thomas Coote	Liberal
Hyde	Thomas Ashton	Liberal
Hythe	Sir Edward Watkin, Bt	Independent Liberal
== I ==
Ilkeston	Thomas Watson	Liberal
Ince	Henry Blundell	Conservative
Inverness District of Burghs	Robert Finlay	Liberal
Inverness-shire	Charles Fraser-Mackintosh	Crofters'
Ipswich (Two members)	Jesse Collings	Liberal
Ipswich (Two members)	Henry Wyndham West	Liberal
Isle of Thanet	Edward King-Harman	Conservative
Isle of Wight	Richard Webster	Conservative
Islington East	Henry Bret Ince	Liberal
Islington North	Sir George Trout Bartley	Conservative
Islington South	Henry Spicer	Liberal
Islington West	Richard Chamberlain	Liberal
== J ==
Jarrow	Charles Palmer	Liberal
== K ==
Keighley	Isaac Holden	Liberal
Kendal	Thomas Taylour	Conservative
Kennington	Robert Gent-Davis	Conservative
Kensington North	Sir Roper Lethbridge	Conservative
Kensington South	Sir Algernon Borthwick	Conservative
Kerry East	Jeremiah Sheehan	Irish Parliamentary
Kerry North	John Stack	Irish Parliamentary
Kerry South	John O'Connor	Irish Parliamentary
Kerry West	Edward Harrington	Irish Parliamentary
Kidderminster	John Brinton	Liberal
Kildare North	James Laurence Carew	Irish Parliamentary
Kildare South	James Leahy	Irish Parliamentary
Kilkenny City	John Francis Smithwick	Irish Parliamentary
County Kilkenny North	Edward Marum	Irish Parliamentary
County Kilkenny South	Patrick Chance	Irish Parliamentary
Kilmarnock Burghs	Peter Sturrock	Conservative
Kincardineshire	Sir George Balfour	Liberal
King's Lynn	Hon. Robert Bourke	Conservative
Kingston upon Hull Central	Seymour King	Conservative
Kingston upon Hull East	William Saunders	Liberal
Kingston upon Hull West	Charles Wilson	Liberal
Kingston-upon-Thames	Sir John Ellis, Bt	Conservative
Kingswinford	Alexander Staveley Hill	Conservative
Kirkcaldy District of Burghs	Sir George Campbell	Independent Liberal
Kirkcudbrightshire	Mark MacTaggart-Stewart	Conservative
Knutsford	Hon. Alan Egerton	Conservative
== L ==
Lambeth North	Charles Craufurd Fraser	Conservative
Lanarkshire Mid	Stephen Mason	Liberal
Lanarkshire North East	Donald Crawford	Liberal
Lanarkshire North West	John Baird	Conservative
Lanarkshire South	John Hamilton	Liberal
Lancaster	George Marton	Conservative
Launceston	Thomas Dyke Acland	Liberal
Leeds Central	Gerald Balfour	Conservative
Leeds East	Richard Dawson	Conservative
Leeds North	William Jackson	Conservative
Leeds South	Sir Lyon Playfair	Liberal
Leeds West	Herbert Gladstone	Liberal
Leek	Charles Crompton	Liberal
Leicester (Two members)	Alexander McArthur	Liberal
Leicester (Two members)	James Allanson Picton	Liberal
Leigh	Caleb Wright	Liberal
Leith District of Burghs	William Jacks	Liberal
Leitrim North	Michael Conway	Irish Parliamentary
Leitrim South	Luke Hayden	Irish Parliamentary
Leix	Richard Lalor	Irish Parliamentary
Leominster	Thomas Duckham	Liberal
Lewes	Sir Henry Fletcher, Bt	Conservative
Lewisham	William Legge	Conservative
Lichfield	Sir John Swinburne, Bt	Liberal
Limehouse	Edward Samuel Norris	Conservative
Limerick City	Henry Joseph Gill	Irish Parliamentary
County Limerick East	John Finucane	Irish Parliamentary
County Limerick West	William Abraham	Irish Parliamentary
Lincoln	Joseph Ruston	Liberal
Linlithgowshire	Peter McLagan	Liberal
Liverpool Abercromby	William Lawrence	Conservative
Liverpool East Toxteth	Baron Henry de Worms	Conservative
Liverpool Everton	Edward Whitley	Conservative
Liverpool Exchange	Laurence Richardson Baily	Conservative
Liverpool Kirkdale	Sir George Baden-Powell	Conservative
Liverpool Scotland	T. P. O'Connor	Irish Parliamentary
Liverpool Walton	John George Gibson	Conservative
Liverpool West Derby	Lord Claud Hamilton	Conservative
Liverpool West Toxteth	Thomas Royden	Conservative
City of London (Two members)	John Hubbard	Conservative
City of London (Two members)	Sir Robert Fowler, Bt	Conservative
London University	Sir John Lubbock	Liberal
Londonderry City	Charles Lewis	Conservative
Londonderry North	Henry Mulholland	Conservative
Londonderry South	Tim Healy	Irish Parliamentary
Longford North	Justin McCarthy	Irish Parliamentary
Longford South	Laurence Connolly	Irish Parliamentary
Lonsdale North	William George Ainslie	Conservative
Loughborough	Edward Johnson-Ferguson	Liberal
Louth	Francis Otter	Liberal
Louth North	Joseph Nolan	Irish Parliamentary
Louth South	T. P. Gill	Irish Parliamentary
Lowestoft	Sir Savile Crossley, Bt	Liberal
Ludlow	Robert Jasper More	Liberal
Luton	Cyril Flower	Liberal
== M ==
Macclesfield	William Brocklehurst	Liberal
Maidstone	Alexander Henry Ross	Conservative
Maldon	Arthur Kitching	Liberal
Manchester East	Arthur Balfour	Conservative
Manchester North	James Frederick Hutton	Conservative
Manchester North East	Sir James Fergusson, Bt	Conservative
Manchester North West	William Houldsworth	Conservative
Manchester South	Henry Roscoe	Liberal
Manchester South West	Frederick Spencer Hamilton	Conservative
Mansfield	Cecil Foljambe	Liberal
Marylebone East	Lord Charles Beresford	Conservative
Marylebone West	Frederick Seager Hunt	Conservative
Mayo East	John Dillon	Irish Parliamentary
Mayo North	Daniel Crilly	Irish Parliamentary
Mayo South	J. F. X. O'Brien	Irish Parliamentary
Mayo West	John Deasy	Irish Parliamentary
Meath North	Kevin Izod O'Doherty	Irish Parliamentary
Meath South	Edward Sheil	Irish Parliamentary
Medway	Hon. John Gathorne-Hardy	Conservative
Melton	Lord John Manners	Conservative
Merionethshire	Henry Robertson	Liberal
Merthyr Tydfil (Two members)	Henry Richard	Liberal
Merthyr Tydfil (Two members)	Charles James	Liberal
Middlesbrough	Isaac Wilson	Liberal
Middleton	George Salis-Schwabe	Liberal
Midlothian	William Ewart Gladstone	Liberal
Mile End	Spencer Charrington	Conservative
Monaghan North	Tim Healy	Irish Parliamentary
Monaghan South	Sir Joseph Neale McKenna	Irish Parliamentary
Monmouth Boroughs	Edward Carbutt	Liberal
Monmouthshire North	Thomas Phillips Price	Liberal
Monmouthshire South	Hon. Frederick Courtenay Morgan	Conservative
Monmouthshire West	Marshall Warmington	Liberal
Montgomery District	Pryce Pryce-Jones	Conservative
Montgomeryshire	Stuart Rendel	Liberal
Montrose District of Burghs	John Shiress Will	Liberal
Morley	Charles Milnes Gaskell	Liberal
Morpeth	Thomas Burt	Liberal-Labour
== N ==
New Forest	Francis Compton	Conservative
Newark	Viscount Newark	Conservative
Newbury	William George Mount	Conservative
Newcastle-upon-Tyne (Two members)	Joseph Cowen	Independent Liberal
Newcastle-upon-Tyne (Two members)	John Morley	Liberal
Newcastle-under-Lyme	William Shepherd Allen	Liberal
Newington West	Charles Cooke	Conservative
Newmarket	George Newnes	Liberal
Newport	Robert Bickersteth	Liberal
Newry	Justin Huntly McCarthy	Irish Parliamentary
Newton	R. A. Cross	Conservative
Norfolk East	Edward Birkbeck	Conservative
Norfolk Mid	Robert Gurdon	Liberal
Norfolk North	Herbert Cozens-Hardy	Liberal
Norfolk North West	Joseph Arch	Liberal-Labour
Norfolk South	Francis Taylor	Liberal
Norfolk South West	William Tyssen-Amherst	Conservative
Normanton	Benjamin Pickard	Liberal-Labour
Northampton (Two members)	Charles Bradlaugh	Liberal
Northampton (Two members)	Henry Labouchère	Liberal
Northamptonshire East	Francis Channing	Liberal
Northamptonshire Mid	Hon. Charles Spencer	Liberal
Northamptonshire North	Lord Burghley	Conservative
Northamptonshire South	Sir Rainald Knightley, Bt	Conservative
Northwich	John Brunner	Liberal
Norwich (Two members)	Jeremiah Colman	Liberal
Norwich (Two members)	Sir Harry Bullard	Conservative
Norwood	Thomas Bristowe	Conservative
Nottingham East	Arnold Morley	Liberal
Nottingham South	John Williams	Liberal
Nottingham West	Charles Seely	Liberal
Nuneaton	Jasper Johns	Liberal
== O ==
Oldham (Two members)	J. T. Hibbert	Liberal
Oldham (Two members)	James Mackenzie Maclean	Conservative
Orkney and Shetland	Leonard Lyell	Liberal
Ormskirk	Arthur Forwood	Conservative
Osgoldcross	Sir John Ramsden, Bt	Liberal
Ossory	Arthur O'Connor	Irish Parliamentary
Oswestry	Stanley Leighton	Conservative
Otley	Sir Andrew Fairbairn	Liberal
Oxford	Alexander William Hall	Conservative
Oxford University (Two members)	Sir John Mowbray, Bt	Conservative
Oxford University (Two members)	John Gilbert Talbot	Conservative
== P ==
Paddington North	Lionel Louis Cohen	Conservative
Paddington South	Lord Randolph Churchill	Conservative
Paisley	William Boyle Barbour	Liberal
Partick	Alexander Craig Sellar	Liberal
Peckham	Arthur Anthony Baumann	Conservative
Peebles and Selkirk	Sir Charles Tennant, Bt	Liberal
Pembroke and Haverfordwest District	Henry George Allen	Liberal
Pembrokeshire	William Davies	Liberal
Penrith	Henry Howard	Liberal
Penryn and Falmouth	David James Jenkins	Liberal
Perth	Charles Stuart Parker	Independent Liberal
Perthshire Eastern	Robert Stewart Menzies	Liberal
Perthshire Western	Sir Donald Currie	Liberal
Peterborough	Hon. John Wentworth-FitzWilliam	Independent Liberal
Petersfield	Viscount Wolmer	Liberal
Plymouth (Two members)	Edward Clarke	Conservative
Plymouth (Two members)	Sir Edward Bates, Bt	Conservative
Pontefract	Hon. Rowland Winn	Conservative
Poplar	Henry Green	Liberal
Portsmouth (Two members)	Sir William Crossman	Liberal
Portsmouth (Two members)	Philip Vanderbyl	Liberal
Preston (Two members)	William Tomlinson	Conservative
Preston (Two members)	Robert William Hanbury	Conservative
Prestwich	Abel Buckley	Liberal
Pudsey	Briggs Priestley	Liberal
== R ==
Radcliffe cum Farnworth	Robert Leake	Liberal
Radnorshire	Hon. Arthur Walsh	Conservative
Ramsey	William Fellowes	Conservative
Reading	Charles Townshend Murdoch	Conservative
Reigate	Sir Trevor Lawrence, Bt	Conservative
Renfrewshire East	James Finlayson	Liberal
Renfrewshire West	Sir Archibald Campbell, Bt	Conservative
Rhondda	William Abraham	Independent Lib-Lab
Richmond	Sir Frederick Milbank, Bt	Liberal
Ripon	William Harker	Liberal
Rochdale	Thomas Bayley Potter	Liberal
Rochester	Francis Hughes-Hallett	Conservative
Romford	John Westlake	Liberal
Roscommon North	James Joseph O'Kelly	Irish Parliamentary
Roscommon South	Andrew Commins	Irish Parliamentary
Ross	Michael Biddulph	Liberal
Ross and Cromarty	Roderick Macdonald	Crofters'
Rossendale	Spencer Cavendish	Liberal
Rotherham	Arthur Dyke Acland	Liberal
Rotherhithe	Charles Hamilton	Conservative
Roxburghshire	Hon. Arthur Elliot	Liberal
Rugby	Henry Peyton Cobb	Liberal
Rushcliffe	John Ellis	Liberal
Rutland	George Finch	Conservative
Rye	Arthur Montagu Brookfield	Conservative
== S ==
Saffron Walden	Herbert Gardner	Liberal
St Albans	James Grimston	Conservative
St Andrews District of Burghs	Sir Robert Anstruther, Bt	Independent Liberal
St Augustine's	Aretas Akers-Douglas	Conservative
St Austell	William Copeland Borlase	Liberal
St George, Hanover Square	Lord Algernon Percy	Conservative
St George, Tower Hamlets	Charles Ritchie	Conservative
St Helens	Sir Henry Seton-Karr	Conservative
St Ives	Sir John St Aubyn, Bt	Liberal
St Pancras East	Thomas Gibb	Liberal
St Pancras North	Thomas Henry Bolton	Liberal
St Pancras South	Sir Julian Goldsmid, Bt	Liberal
St Pancras West	Harry Levy-Lawson	Liberal
Salford North	Edward Hardcastle	Conservative
Salford South	William Mather	Liberal
Salford West	Benjamin Armitage	Liberal
Salisbury	William Grenfell	Liberal
Scarborough	Sir George Sitwell, Bt	Conservative
Sevenoaks	Charles Mills	Conservative
Sheffield, Attercliffe	Hon. Bernard Coleridge	Liberal
Sheffield, Brightside	A. J. Mundella	Liberal
Sheffield, Central	Sir Howard Vincent	Conservative
Sheffield, Ecclesall	Sir Ellis Ashmead-Bartlett	Conservative
Sheffield, Hallam	Charles Stuart-Wortley	Conservative
Shipley	Joseph Craven	Liberal
Shrewsbury	James Watson	Conservative
Skipton	Sir Mathew Wilson, Bt	Liberal
Sleaford	Henry Chaplin	Conservative
Sligo North	Peter McDonald	Irish Parliamentary
Sligo South	Thomas Sexton	Irish Parliamentary
Somerset Eastern	Henry Hobhouse	Liberal
Somerset Northern	Evan Henry Llewellyn	Conservative
Somerset Southern	Viscount Kilcoursie	Liberal
South Molton	Viscount Lymington	Liberal
South Shields	James Cochran Stevenson	Liberal
Southampton (Two members)	Alfred Giles	Conservative
Southampton (Two members)	Sir John Edmund Commerell	Conservative
Southport	George Augustus Pilkington	Liberal
Southwark West	Arthur Cohen	Liberal
Sowerby	Edward Crossley	Liberal
Spalding	Hon. Murray Finch-Hatton	Conservative
Spen Valley	Joseph Woodhead	Liberal
Stafford	Charles McLaren	Liberal
Staffordshire North West	George Leveson-Gower	Liberal
Staffordshire West	Hamar Alfred Bass	Liberal
Stalybridge	Tom Harrop Sidebottom	Conservative
Stamford	John Compton Lawrance	Conservative
Stepney	John Charles Durant	Liberal
Stirling District of Burghs	Henry Campbell-Bannerman	Liberal
Stirlingshire	Joseph Cheney Bolton	Liberal
Stockport (Two members)	Louis John Jennings	Conservative
Stockport (Two members)	William Tipping	Conservative
Stockton-on-Tees	Joseph Dodds	Liberal
Stoke-on-Trent Stoke	William Leatham Bright	Liberal
Stowmarket	Felix Cobbold	Liberal
Strand	W. H. Smith	Conservative
Stratford upon Avon	Earl Compton	Liberal
Stretford	William Agnew	Liberal
Stroud	Hon. Henry Brand	Liberal
Sudbury	Cuthbert Quilter	Liberal
Sunderland (Two members)	Sir Edward Gourley	Liberal
Sunderland (Two members)	Samuel Storey	Liberal
Sutherlandshire	The Marquess of Stafford	Liberal
Swansea District	Sir Henry Vivian, Bt	Liberal
Swansea Town	Lewis Llewelyn Dillwyn	Liberal
== T ==
Tamworth	Philip Muntz	Conservative
Taunton	Samuel Allsopp	Conservative
Tavistock	Viscount Ebrington	Liberal
Tewkesbury	John Yorke	Conservative
Thirsk and Malton	Lewis Payn Dawnay	Conservative
Thornbury	Stafford Howard	Liberal
Tipperary East	Thomas Condon	Irish Parliamentary
Tipperary Mid	Thomas Mayne	Irish Parliamentary
Tipperary North	Patrick Joseph O'Brien	Irish Parliamentary
Tipperary South	John O'Connor	Irish Parliamentary
Tiverton	William Walrond	Conservative
Torquay	Lewis McIver	Liberal
Totnes	Francis Bingham Mildmay	Liberal
Tottenham	Joseph Howard	Conservative
Truro	William Bickford-Smith	Liberal
Tullamore	Joseph Francis Fox	Irish Parliamentary
Tunbridge	Robert Norton	Conservative
Tynemouth	Richard Donkin	Conservative
Tyneside	Albert Grey	Liberal
Tyrone East	William James Reynolds	Irish Parliamentary
Tyrone Mid	Matthew Joseph Kenny	Irish Parliamentary
Tyrone North	Lord Ernest Hamilton	Conservative
Tyrone South	William O'Brien	Irish Parliamentary
== U ==
Uxbridge	Frederick Dixon-Hartland	Conservative
== W ==
Wakefield	Edward Green	Conservative
Walsall	Sir Charles Forster, Bt	Liberal
Walthamstow	Edward Buxton	Liberal
Walworth	Lewis Henry Isaacs	Conservative
Wandsworth	Henry Kimber	Conservative
Wansbeck	Charles Fenwick	Liberal-Labour
Warrington	Sir Gilbert Greenall, Bt	Conservative
Warwick and Leamington	Arthur Peel	Liberal
Waterford City	Richard Power	Irish Parliamentary
County Waterford East	Patrick Power	Irish Parliamentary
County Waterford West	Douglas Pyne	Irish Parliamentary
Watford	Frederick Halsey	Conservative
Wednesbury	Wilson Lloyd	Conservative
Wellington (Salop)	Alexander Brown	Liberal
Wellington (Somerset)	Sir Thomas Dyke Acland, Bt	Liberal
Wells	Sir Richard Paget, Bt	Conservative
West Bromwich	John Horton Blades	Liberal
West Ham North	Edward Rider Cook	Liberal
West Ham South	Joseph Leicester	Liberal-Labour
Westbury	George Fuller	Liberal
Westhoughton	Frank Hardcastle	Conservative
Westmeath North	James Tuite	Irish Parliamentary
Westmeath South	Donal Sullivan	Irish Parliamentary
Westminster	William Burdett-Coutts	Conservative
Wexford North	John Redmond	Irish Parliamentary
Wexford South	John Barry	Irish parliamentary
Whitby	Ernest Beckett	Conservative
Whitechapel	Samuel Montagu	Liberal
Whitehaven	George Cavendish-Bentinck	Conservative
Wick District of Burghs	John Macdonald Cameron	Independent Liberal
Wicklow East	William Joseph Corbet	Irish Parliamentary Party
Wicklow West	Garrett Byrne	Irish Parliamentary Party
Widnes	Tom Edwards-Moss	Conservative
Wigan	Francis Powell	Conservative
Wigtownshire	Sir Herbert Maxwell, Bt	Conservative
Wilton	Sir Thomas Grove, Bt	Liberal
Wimbledon	Cosmo Bonsor	Conservative
Winchester	Arthur Loftus Tottenham	Conservative
Windsor	Robert Richardson-Gardner	Conservative
Wirral	Edward Cotton	Conservative
Wisbech	John Rigby	Liberal
Wokingham	Sir George Russell	Conservative
Wolverhampton East	Henry Fowler	Liberal
Wolverhampton South	Hon. Charles Pelham Villiers	Liberal
Wolverhampton West	Alfred Hickman	Conservative
Woodbridge	Robert Lacey Everett	Liberal
Woodstock	Francis William Maclean	Liberal
Woolwich	Edwin Hughes	Conservative
Worcester	George Allsopp	Conservative
Worcestershire East	George Hastings	Liberal
Worcestershire North	Benjamin Hingley	Liberal
Wycombe	Richard Curzon	Conservative
== Y ==
York (Two members)	Alfred Pease	Liberal
York (Two members)	Frank Lockwood	Liberal

== By-elections ==
See List of United Kingdom by-elections (1885–1900)

== See also ==
- UK general election, 1885
- List of parliaments of the United Kingdom
