= 1921 Mid Armagh by-election =

UK Parliamentary by-election

The 1921 Mid Armagh by-election was held on 23 June 1921. The by-election was held due to the death of the incumbent Ulster Unionist MP, James Rolston Lonsdale. It was won unopposed by the UUP candidate Henry Armstrong.
