= Willie Hooper =

Irish doctor and footballer

William Hooper (died 1946) was an Irish doctor, and soccer player. He married Eileen Moyà (Aileen) O'Brien from Mitchelstown, County Cork in 1912, and they went on to have seven children.

He played for the amateur Bohemians during his career in Ireland. Hooper was a top player in his era and won international caps for the Irish Amateur team. He played in Bohs FAI Cup winning side of 1908, their first ever national trophy. Willie netted the final goal in the 3–1 win over Shelbourne in the replay. Hooper also scored in the final of that competition the following year but could only earn as runners-up medal as Cliftonville beat Bohs 2–1 in a replay at Dalymount Park.

Willie died in 1946 while President of the FAI.

== Family ==
His father was the journalist, politician and MP, Alderman John Hooper. His brother Richard was also a top footballer in Ireland in the same era and played many games alongside his brother in the red and black of Bohemians. They also were the first brothers to captain Bohs; Willie captained the club in 1910, five years after his brother had the honour.

Another of his brothers, John Hooper, was the first Director of Statistics in the Irish Free State.

== Honours ==
- Irish Cup: 1
  - Bohemians - 1908
