= Henry Armstrong (Northern Ireland politician) =

Politician and barrister from Northern Ireland

Henry Bruce Wright Armstrong
- Armstrong in July 1922
- Born: 27 July 1844; Sholden, Kent, England
- Died: 4 December 1943 (aged 99); Northern Ireland
- Education: The Royal School, Armagh; Trinity College, Cambridge
- Occupations: Barrister & politician
- Spouse: Margaret Leader (m. 1883; died 1936)
- Children: 8
- Parents: William Jones Wright Armstrong (father); Frances Elizabeth McCreagh (mother)
- Relatives: Christopher Wyborne Armstrong (son)

Henry Bruce Wright Armstrong (27 July 1844 – 4 December 1943) was a Northern Irish barrister and politician, Unionist Member of Parliament (MP) for Mid Armagh from June 1921 until 1922.

Born in Sholden, Henry Bruce Armstrong was the second surviving son of William Jones Wright Armstrong of County Armagh and Frances Elizabeth, widow of Sir Michael McCreagh, and daughter of Major Christopher Wilson. He was educated at The Royal School, Armagh and Trinity College, Cambridge, gaining a BA (2nd Class Law Tripos) in 1867 and an MA in 1870. Admitted at the Inner Temple in 1866, he was called to the Bar in 1868.

In 1883 he married Margaret Leader (died 1936), daughter of William Leader of Rosnalea, County Cork. They had five sons and three daughters, of whom C. W. Armstrong also became a politician.

Armstrong was appointed High Sheriff of Armagh for 1875 and High Sheriff of Longford for 1894. He was a County Councillor for Armagh from 1899 to 1920, and a Member of the Irish Convention in 1917–18. Vice-Lieutenant of County Armagh in 1920, he was a Senator of Queen's University Belfast from 1920 to 1937.

He was returned unopposed to the Imperial House of Commons for Mid-Armagh in a by-election in 1921, at the advanced age of 76, becoming one of the oldest first-time MPs whose birth date is recorded. Certainly, he immediately became the oldest member of the current House of Commons. He was a Senator of Northern Ireland from 1921 to 1937, and Lord Lieutenant of Armagh from 1924 to 1939. For 25 years he was a member of the Representative Body of the Church of Ireland. He was Chairman of the County Armagh Education Committee from 1925 to 1931, and President of the Association of Education Committees of N. Ireland. In 1932 he was made a Privy Councillor for Northern Ireland, and in 1938 he served as a Justice for the Government of Northern Ireland in the absence of the Governor.

He died in December 1943, aged 99 years.

Parliament of the United Kingdom
| Preceded by James Rolston Lonsdale | Member of Parliament for Mid Armagh; 1921–1922 | Constituency abolished |
| Preceded by Donald Macmaster | Oldest Member of Parliament (not Father of the House); 1921–1922 | Succeeded by Henry Craik |
Honorary titles
| Preceded by The Lord Armaghdale | Lord Lieutenant of Armagh; 1924–1939 | Succeeded by Sir Norman Stronge, 8th Bt |
