= James Lonsdale (Irish politician) =

Irish politician

Member of Parliament for Mid Armagh
- In office 1918 – 23 May 1921
- Preceded by: John Lonsdale
- Succeeded by: Henry Armstrong

Personal details
- Born: James Rolston Lonsdale; 31 May 1865
- Died: 23 May 1921 (aged 55)
- Party: Irish Unionist
- Spouse: Maud Musker
- Parent: James Lonsdale (father)
- Education: The Royal School, Armagh; Trinity College Dublin

James Rolston Lonsdale (31 May 1865 – 23 May 1921) was Unionist Member of Parliament (MP) for Mid Armagh from January 1918 until his death. He succeeded his brother John to this constituency on the latter's elevation to the Lords as Baron Armaghdale.

The son of James Lonsdale, DL, he was educated at The Royal School, Armagh and Trinity College, Dublin. In 1902 he married Maud Musker, daughter of John Musker of Shadwell Court, Norfolk.

He was appointed High Sheriff of Armagh in 1891. There is a memorial to Lonsdale in the south aisle at St Patrick's Cathedral, Armagh.

Parliament of the United Kingdom
Preceded by John Lonsdale	Member of Parliament for Mid Armagh; 1918 – 1921	Succeeded by Henry Armstrong
