= 1918 Mid Armagh by-election =

UK Parliamentary by-election

The 1918 Mid Armagh by-election was held on 23 January 1918. The by-election was held due to the resignation of the incumbent Conservative MP, Sir John Lonsdale. It was won by his brother, the Conservative candidate James Rolston Lonsdale, who was unopposed.
