= South East Cork (UK Parliament constituency) =

UK parliamentary constituency in Ireland, 1885–1922

- Former county constituency for the House of Commons

1885–1922
- Seats: 1
- Created from: Bandon; County Cork; Kinsale
- Replaced by: Cork Mid, North, South, South East and West

South East Cork, a division of County Cork, was a parliamentary constituency in Ireland, represented in the Parliament of the United Kingdom. From 1885 to 1922 it returned one Member of Parliament (MP) to the House of Commons of the United Kingdom of Great Britain and Ireland.

Until the 1885 general election the area was part of the County Cork constituency. From 1922, on the establishment of the Irish Free State, it was not represented in the UK Parliament.

== Boundaries ==
This constituency comprised the south-eastern part of County Cork, consisting of the baronies of Courceys, Kerrycurrihy, Kinalea, Kinalmeaky and Kinsale, that part of the barony of East Carbery, East Division not contained within the constituency of South Cork, and that part of the barony of Ibane and Barryroe contained within the parishes of Abbeymahon, Desert, Donaghmore, Kilsillagh, Lislee, Templeomalus, Templequinlan and Timoleague, and the townland of Ahidelake in the parish of Island.

== Members of Parliament ==
Election	Member	Party
1885	John Hooper	Irish Parliamentary Party
1889	John Morrogh	Irish Parliamentary Party
1891	John Morrogh	Irish National Federation
1893	Andrew Commins	Irish National Federation
1900	Eugene Crean	Irish Parliamentary Party
1906	Eugene Crean	Irish Parliamentary Party
1910 (Jan)	Eugene Crean	All-for-Ireland League
1910 (Dec)	Eugene Crean	All-for-Ireland League
1918	Diarmuid Lynch	Sinn Féin
1922	Constituency abolished	

== Elections ==
=== Elections in the 1880s ===
1885 general election: South East Cork
Party	Candidate	Votes	%	±%
Irish Parliamentary	John Hooper	4,620	87.5	
Irish Conservative	Augustus Riversdale Warren	661	12.5	
Majority		3,959	75.0	
Turnout		5,281	66.0	
Registered electors		8,007		
Irish Parliamentary win (new seat)				

1886 general election: South East Cork
Party	Candidate	Votes	%	±%
Irish Parliamentary	John Hooper	Unopposed		
Irish Parliamentary hold				

1889 by-election: South East Cork
Party	Candidate	Votes	%	±%
Irish Parliamentary	John Morrogh	Unopposed		
Irish Parliamentary hold				

=== Elections in the 1890s ===
1892 general election: South East Cork
Party	Candidate	Votes	%	±%
Irish National Federation	John Morrogh	4,109	85.6	N/A
Irish Unionist	John Warren Payne Sheares	692	14.4	New
Majority		3,417	71.2	N/A
Turnout		4,801	45.3	N/A
Registered electors		10,602		
Irish National Federation gain from Irish Parliamentary		Swing	N/A	

Morrogh resigned to pursue business interests in South Africa (he was a director of De Beers) and because of disagreements with John Dillon and William O'Brien.

By-election, 1893: South East Cork
Party	Candidate	Votes	%	±%
Irish National Federation	Andrew Commins	Unopposed		
Irish National Federation hold				

1895 general election: South East Cork
Party	Candidate	Votes	%	±%
Irish National Federation	Andrew Commins	Unopposed		
Irish National Federation hold				

=== Elections in the 1900s ===
1900 general election: South East Cork
Party	Candidate	Votes	%	±%
Irish Parliamentary	Eugene Crean	2,037	57.4	N/A
Healyite Nationalist	Matthias Cummins Hickey	1,509	42.6	N/A
Majority		528	14.8	N/A
Turnout		3,546	42.5	N/A
Registered electors		8,339		
Irish Parliamentary hold		Swing	N/A	

1906 general election: South East Cork
Party	Candidate	Votes	%	±%
Irish Parliamentary	Eugene Crean	Unopposed		
Irish Parliamentary hold				

=== Elections in the 1910s ===
January 1910 general election: South East Cork
Party	Candidate	Votes	%	±%
All-for-Ireland	Eugene Crean	2,300	56.7	New
Irish Parliamentary	James Burke	1,757	43.3	N/A
Majority		543	13.4	N/A
Turnout		4,057	60.2	N/A
Registered electors		6,734		
All-for-Ireland gain from Irish Parliamentary		Swing	N/A	

December 1910 general election: South East Cork
Party	Candidate	Votes	%	±%
All-for-Ireland	Eugene Crean	2,408	56.3	−0.4
Irish Parliamentary	Jeremiah Ahern	1,872	43.7	+0.4
Majority		536	12.6	−0.8
Turnout		4,280	63.6	+3.4
Registered electors		6,734		
All-for-Ireland hold		Swing	−0.4	

1918 general election: South East Cork
Party	Candidate	Votes	%	±%
Sinn Féin	Diarmuid Lynch	Unopposed		
Sinn Féin gain from All-for-Ireland				
