= 1889 South East Cork by-election =

UK Parliamentary by-election

The 1889 South East Cork by-election was a parliamentary by-election held for the United Kingdom House of Commons constituency of South East Cork on 3 June 1889. The vacancy arose because of the resignation of the sitting member, John Hooper of the Irish Parliamentary Party. Only one candidate was nominated, John Morrogh of the Irish Parliamentary Party, who was elected unopposed.
