= William Kenny (Irish politician) =

Irish judge and Liberal Unionist politician

William Kenny PC (I), QC (14 January 1846 – 4 February 1921), was an Irish judge and Liberal Unionist politician.

== Biography ==
Kenny was born in Dublin, the only son of Edward Kenny, solicitor, of Kilrush, County Clare, and his wife, Catherine (née Murphy). Before he was called to the bar in 1868, he had graduated with a B.A. from Trinity College Dublin and had worked as a clerk in the Census Office.

He practised law on the Munster Circuit and became a Q.C. in 1885 and a Bencher of the King’s Inns in 1890. He was mainly instrumental in establishing the Liberal Union of Ireland after the defeat of the Home Rule Bill of 1886, and in organising the visit of Lord Hartington and George Goschen to Dublin in 1887.

In 1891, Kenny was adopted as Unionist candidate in the upcoming General Election. Kenny was returned to Parliament for Dublin St Stephen's Green in the 1892 general election as a Unionist over the Nationalist candidate, George Noble Plunkett, aka Count Plunkett, whose son, Joseph Mary Plunkett, was a leader in the 1916 Easter Rising. Count Plunkett would later be elected to office as a Sinn Féin member, after the Rising. The Liberal Unionists promoted land reform and peasant land ownership as a means of positively preserving the Union, but were opposed strongly to local government. William Kenny corresponded with Lord Hartington to that effect, calling Chamberlain’s proposed county councils an "awful scheme of provincial councils", demanding centralised local government as the alternative.

Kenny served as Solicitor-General for Ireland from 1895 to 1898 in the Unionist administration of Lord Salisbury. In the House of Commons, he joined his cousin Matthew Joseph Kenny, who had been elected as a Parnellite in 1882. In 1895, he sat on the Tourist Committee for Ireland.

In 1898, Kenny was appointed a Judge of the High Court; he resigned as Solicitor-General and from his seat in the House of Commons. He was appointed to the Privy Council of Ireland in the 1902 Coronation Honours list published on 26 June 1902, and was sworn in by the Lord Lieutenant of Ireland, Earl Cadogan, at Dublin Castle on 11 August 1902.

Kenny remained on the bench until his death at his Dublin residence, Marlfield, Cabinteely, on 4 February 1921, aged 75. His portrait by Sarah Purser hangs in the King's Inns.

Maurice Healy, in his memoir, The Old Munster Circuit, described Kenny as stern and inflexible, somewhat lacking in empathy for those poorer than himself, but also a sound and learned lawyer with a strong sense of justice. He suggested that Kenny's political views made him a somewhat isolated figure, since, in the fraught political atmosphere of the 1890s and 1900s, Catholic Unionists were regarded by their opponents with particular suspicion.

== Family ==
Kenny married Mary Coffey on 13 August 1873, and they had a family of eight children.

Parliament of the United Kingdom
Preceded by Thomas Alexander Dickson	Member of Parliament for Dublin St Stephen's Green; 1892 – 1898	Succeeded by James Campbell
Legal offices
Preceded by Charles Hemphill	Solicitor-General for Ireland; 1895–1898	Succeeded by Sir Dunbar Barton
