= 1891 Mid Armagh by-election =

UK parliamentary by-election

The 1891 Mid Armagh by-election was a parliamentary by-election held for the United Kingdom House of Commons constituency of Mid Armagh on 17 December 1891. The vacancy arose because of the death of the sitting member, Sir James Corry of the new Irish Unionist Party.

Only one candidate was nominated, Dunbar Barton also of the Irish Unionist Party, who was therefore elected unopposed. Barton remained as member for Mid Armagh until 1900, when he was appointed as a judge.
