= Mid Armagh (UK Parliament constituency) =

Parliamentary constituency in the United Kingdom, 1885–1922

- Former county constituency for the House of Commons
- County: County Armagh

1885–1922
- Seats: 1
- Created from: County Armagh and Armagh City
- Replaced by: Armagh

Mid Armagh was a constituency in the Parliament of the United Kingdom. It was created by the Redistribution of Seats Act and first used at the 1885 general election. It returned one Member of Parliament (MP) until it was abolished with effect from the 1922 general election.

== Boundaries ==
Under the Redistribution of Seats Act 1885, the constituency of County Armagh was divided into three divisions and the parliamentary borough of Armagh lost its separate representation. The county constituency of Mid Armagh comprised the central part of County Armagh. To the north was North Armagh, to the west were South Tyrone and North Monaghan, to the south were South Monaghan and South Armagh and to the east was West Down.

1885–1922: The baronies of Armagh and Tiranny, that part of the barony of Oneilland West not contained within the constituency of North Armagh, that part of the barony of Fews Lower contained within the parishes of Kildarton and Mullaghbrack, the parish of Lisnadill excluding the townlands of Ballymacnab, Cashel, Foley and Seagahan, and the townlands of Corhammock and Edenykennedy in the parish of Kilclooney, that part of the barony of Orior Lower consisting of that part of the parish of Kilmore not contained within the constituency of North Armagh and the townlands of Aughlish, Ballymore, Ballysheil Beg, Ballysheil More, Cargans, Clare, Cloghoge, Coolyhill, Derryallen, Drumnaleg, Druminure, Drumnaglontagh, Lisbane, Lisnakea, Mavemacullen, Monclone, Moodoge, Mullantur, Mullaghglass, Terryhoogan, Tullyhugh and Tullymacann in the parish of Ballymore, and that part of the barony of Fews Upper consisting of the townland of Lisnadill.

After the dissolution of Parliament in 1922 the area was part of the Armagh constituency.

== Politics ==
The constituency was a predominantly Conservative then Unionist area, although not as strongly so as some other parts of Northern Ireland. There were few contested elections and no instance of the same two parties contending against each other more than once.

In 1918, Sinn Féin contested the election on a manifesto of abstention from Westminster. In Mid Armagh, the Unionists defeated Sinn Féin by a solid margin. This was the first contested election for the seat since a 1900 by-election.

== Members of Parliament ==
- Constituency created (1885)

Election	Member	Party
1885	John McKane	Conservative
February 1886 (by)	Sir James Corry, Bt.	Conservative
1891	Sir Dunbar Barton	Irish Unionist
1900 (by)	John Lonsdale	Irish Unionist
1918 (by)	James Rolston Lonsdale	Irish Unionist
1921	Henry Armstrong	Ulster Unionist

- Constituency abolished (1922)

== Elections ==
=== 1920s ===
By-Election, 23 June 1921: Mid Armagh
Party	Candidate	Votes	%	±%
UUP	Henry Armstrong	Unopposed		
UUP hold				

=== 1910s ===
1918 general election: Mid Armagh
Party	Candidate	Votes	%	±%
Irish Unionist	James Rolston Lonsdale	8,431	59.7	N/A
Sinn Féin	Liam O'Brien	5,688	40.3	New
Majority		2,743	19.4	N/A
Turnout		14,119	81.4	N/A
Irish Unionist hold		Swing	N/A	

By-Election, 23 January 1918: Mid Armagh
Party	Candidate	Votes	%	±%
Irish Unionist	James Rolston Lonsdale	Unopposed		
Irish Unionist hold				

December 1910 general election: Mid Armagh
Party	Candidate	Votes	%	±%
Irish Unionist	John Lonsdale	Unopposed		
Irish Unionist hold				

January 1910 general election: Mid Armagh
Party	Candidate	Votes	%	±%
Irish Unionist	John Lonsdale	Unopposed		
Irish Unionist hold				

=== 1900s ===
1906 general election: Mid Armagh
Party	Candidate	Votes	%	±%
Irish Unionist	John Lonsdale	Unopposed		
Irish Unionist hold				

1900 general election: Mid Armagh
Party	Candidate	Votes	%	±%
Irish Unionist	John Lonsdale	Unopposed		
Irish Unionist hold				

By-Election 1900: Mid Armagh
Party	Candidate	Votes	%	±%
Irish Unionist	John Lonsdale	3,212	64.0	N/A
Liberal Unionist	John Gordon	1,811	36.0	New
Majority		1,401	28.0	N/A
Turnout		5,023	68.2	N/A
Registered electors		7,363		
Irish Unionist hold		Swing	N/A	

=== 1890s ===
By-Election 1898: Mid Armagh
Party	Candidate	Votes	%	±%
Irish Unionist	Dunbar Barton	Unopposed		
Irish Unionist hold				

1895 general election: Mid Armagh
Party	Candidate	Votes	%	±%
Irish Unionist	Dunbar Barton	Unopposed		
Irish Unionist hold				

1892 general election: Mid Armagh
Party	Candidate	Votes	%	±%
Irish Unionist	Dunbar Barton	Unopposed		
Irish Unionist hold				

By-Election 1891: Mid Armagh
Party	Candidate	Votes	%	±%
Irish Unionist	Dunbar Barton	Unopposed		
Irish Unionist hold				

=== 1880s ===
1886 general election: Mid Armagh
Party	Candidate	Votes	%	±%
Irish Conservative	James Corry	4,160	62.3	+1.3
Irish Parliamentary	Robert Riddall Gardner	2,522	37.7	−1.3
Majority		1,638	24.6	+2.6
Turnout		6,682	81.8	−2.0
Registered electors		8,169		
Irish Conservative hold		Swing	+1.3	

By-Election 1 Feb 1886: Mid Armagh
Party	Candidate	Votes	%	±%
Conservative	James Corry	3,930	56.9	−4.1
Liberal	Thomas Alexander Dickson	2,974	43.1	New
Majority		956	13.8	−8.2
Turnout		6,904	84.5	+0.7
Registered electors		8,169		
Irish Conservative hold		Swing		

- Caused by McKane's death.

1885 general election: Mid Armagh
Party	Candidate	Votes	%	±%
Irish Conservative	John McKane	4,178	61.0	
Irish Parliamentary	Edmund Leamy	2,667	39.0	
Majority		1,511	22.0	
Turnout		6,845	83.8	
Registered electors		8,169		
Irish Conservative win (new seat)				

== See also ==
- List of United Kingdom Parliament constituencies in Ireland

== Sources ==
- Walker, B.M., ed. (1978). Parliamentary Election Results in Ireland, 1801–1922. Dublin: Royal Irish Academy. ISBN 0901714127.
- Who's Who of British Members of Parliament: Volume II 1886-1918, edited by M. Stenton and S. Lees (The Harvester Press 1978)
- Who's Who of British Members of Parliament: Volume III 1919-1945, edited by M. Stenton and S. Lees (The Harvester Press 1979)
- Leigh Rayment's Historical List of MPs – Constituencies beginning with "A" (part 2)
