= 1900 Mid Armagh by-election =

UK Parliamentary by-election

The 1900 Mid Armagh by-election was a parliamentary by-election held for the United Kingdom House of Commons constituency of Mid Armagh on 1 October 1900. The vacancy arose because of the resignation of the sitting member Dunbar Barton, of the Irish Unionist Alliance.

The by-election was won by John Lonsdale of the Irish Unionist Party.

== Result ==
1900 Mid Armagh by-election
Party	Candidate	Votes	%	±%
Irish Unionist	John Lonsdale	3,212	64.0	N/A
Liberal Unionist	John Gordon	1,811	36.0	New
Majority		1,401	28.0	N/A
Turnout		5,023	68.2	N/A
Registered electors		7,363		
Irish Unionist hold		Swing	N/A	
