= 1886 Mid Armagh by-election =

UK parliamentary by-election

The 1886 Mid Armagh by-election was a parliamentary by-election held on 1 February 1886 for the British House of Commons constituency of Mid Armagh in Ireland. The seat had become vacant when the Conservative Member of Parliament (MP) John McKane had died on 11 January 1886. McKane had held the seat since it had been created for the 1885 general election. The Conservative candidate, Sir James Corry, previously an MP for Belfast, held the seat for the party.

== Result ==
Mid Armagh by-election, 1886
Party	Candidate	Votes	%	±%
Conservative	Sir James Corry, Bt.	3,930	56.92	−4.12
Liberal	Thomas Alexander Dickson	2,974	43.08	New
Majority		956	13.84	−8.23
Turnout		8,169	84.51	+0.72
Conservative hold		Swing		
