= Sir James Corry, 1st Baronet =

Irish politician

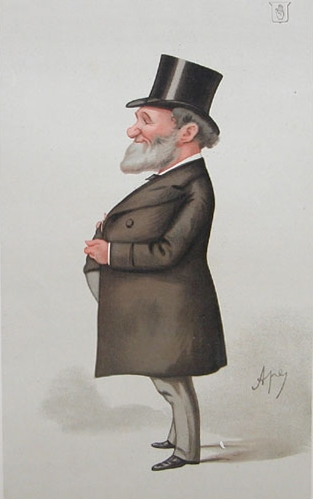
"a temperate Ulster man" Corry as caricatured by Ape (Carlo Pellegrini) in Vanity Fair, May 1887

Sir James Porter Corry, 1st Baronet (8 September 1826 – 28 November 1891) was an Irish politician. He served as a Conservative Member of Parliament (MP) from 1874 to 1891 and an Irish Unionist Alliance MP until his death.

Sir James was the son of Robert Corry, of Turnagardy (Tullinagardy/Tullynagardy), Newtownards, County Down, a quarry owner and Belfast timber merchant. Educated at the Royal Belfast Academic Institution, he entered the family timber firm, which was at that time occupied with building the growing industrial port of Belfast.

He was first elected to Parliament for the Irish constituency of Belfast in the 1874 general election. The constituency was abolished for the 1885 general election. On 15 September 1885 he was created a baronet, of Dunraven, County Antrim.

On 1 February 1886 he became the MP for Mid Armagh in a by-election following the death of John McKane. In July 1891, he joined the Irish Unionist Alliance. He died, in office, in November at his home, Dunraven on Belfast's Malone Road, and was succeeded in the baronetcy by his son, William.

== Arms ==
Coat of arms of Sir James Corry, 1st Baronet

Notes
Granted 8 September 1885 by Sir John Bernard Burke, Ulster King of Arms.
Crest
A cock Proper charged on the breast with a trefoil slipped Vert.
Escutcheon
Gules a saltire engrailed Argent between in chief a rose of the last barbed and seeded Proper in fess two thistles slipped also Proper and in base a trefoil slipped Or.
Motto
Vigilans Et Audax

Parliament of the United Kingdom
| Preceded by Thomas McClure and William Johnston | Member of Parliament for Belfast; 1874 – 1885; With: William Johnston (until 1878); William Ewart (1878–1885) | Constituency abolished |
| Preceded by John McKane | Member of Parliament for Mid Armagh; 1886 – 1891 | Succeeded by Dunbar Barton |
Baronetage of the United Kingdom
| New creation | Baronet (of Dunraven); 1885–1891 | Succeeded by William Corry |
