= John Lonsdale, 1st Baron Armaghdale =

British politician

The Right Honourable The Lord Armaghdale Bt.
- Lord Armaghdale in the early 1920s.

Member of Parliament for Mid Armagh
- In office 1900–1918
- Preceded by: Sir Dunbar Barton
- Succeeded by: James Lonsdale

Personal details
- Born: John Brownlee Lonsdale; 23 March 1850 The Pavilion, County Armagh, Ireland
- Died: 8 June 1924 (aged 74) London
- Party: Irish Unionist
- Spouse: Florence Rumney (m. 1887)
- Parents: James Lonsdale (father); Jane Brownlee (mother)
- Relatives: James Lonsdale (brother)

John Brownlee Lonsdale, 1st Baron Armaghdale (23 March 1850 – 8 June 1924), known as Sir John Lonsdale, Bt, between 1911 and 1918, was a British businessman and Conservative politician.

== Early life ==
Born at The Pavilion, in the cathedral city of Armagh, Lonsdale was the son of James Lonsdale DL, JP (1826–1913) and Jane Brownlee, and was educated privately. He was a partner in the family firm of J. and J. Lonsdale & Company.

== Business and political career ==
Lonsdale was a director of the Lancashire and Yorkshire Bank and of the North of England Debenture Company, chairman of Levenstein Ltd and vice-chairman of the Manchester Ship Canal Warehousing Company. In 1895 he was appointed High Sheriff of Armagh, succeeding William Maynard Sinton. He was elected a Member of Parliament for Mid-Armagh in a by-election in February 1900 although he lived in Manchester. and sat until 1918. During his time in parliament, he acted as a whip for the Irish Unionist Party in the House of Commons for 15 years, and was a strong opponent of Home Rule. He was created a baronet, of Prince's Gardens in the Royal Borough of Kensington and of The Pavilion in the City and County of Armagh, on 7 July 1911, and raised to the peerage as Baron Armaghdale, of Armagh in the County of Armagh, on 17 January 1918. Between 1920 and 1924 he was Lord Lieutenant of Armagh.

Lonsdale was hostile to the Irish language in his political life. On 25 July 1906, the sitting Lord Lieutenant of Ireland, John Hamilton-Gordon, had to write to the Intermediate Board (the organisation through which public education policy was implemented), to see that progress was made, due to the frustration of Irish language education provision by those who controlled it. In response, Lonsdale, while sitting as MP for Mid Armagh and member of the Ulster Unionist Council, claimed that the Gaelic movement which supported the Irish language was simply inspired by hatred of England and all things English. He opposed any teaching of Irish in primary schools as "money wasted" and "useless" as well as claiming that Irish was a vehicle for the dissemination of "seditious views."

== Personal life ==
Lord Armaghdale married Florence Rumney, of Stubbins House, Lancashire. They had no children. The Armaghdales lived in England at The Dunes, Sandwich Bay, and kept a London house at Prince's Gardens, SW7. A keen golfer, Lord Armaghdale presented the Lonsdale Cup to the County Armagh Golf Club. He died in London on 8 June 1924, aged 74, when the baronetcy and barony became extinct. Lady Armaghdale died in London in 1937.

== Memorials ==
=== In steam ===
==== First locomotive ====
The Lady Armaghdale is the name of a steam locomotive on public display in the Engine House at Highley in Shropshire on the Severn Valley Railway. This is not the first steam engine to carry this name. The first was purchased by Levenstein Ltd in 1920 from the manufacturer Hawthorne Leslie and located at the Blackley dyestuffs works in Manchester. In those days it was common to name steam locomotives serving industry and this one was named after the chairman's wife. The locomotive remained in use at the Blackley works until early in 1963 when there was an accident and it could not be repaired.

==== Second locomotive ====
In 1963 the nearby Manchester Ship Canal Railway was taking steam locomotives out of service but the company (then ICI) purchased a replacement from the Ship Canal. Although this replacement was 22 years older (Hunslet Engine Co 1898) it had recently been refurbished. The replacement locomotive was repainted in a vivid cherry red and the Lady Armaghdale nameplates were fixed to the water tanks. It was used until 1968 when rail traffic was transferred to road. The locomotive was sold to the Warwickshire Industrial Locomotive Preservation Group who transferred it to the Severn Valley Railway.

=== At Armagh ===
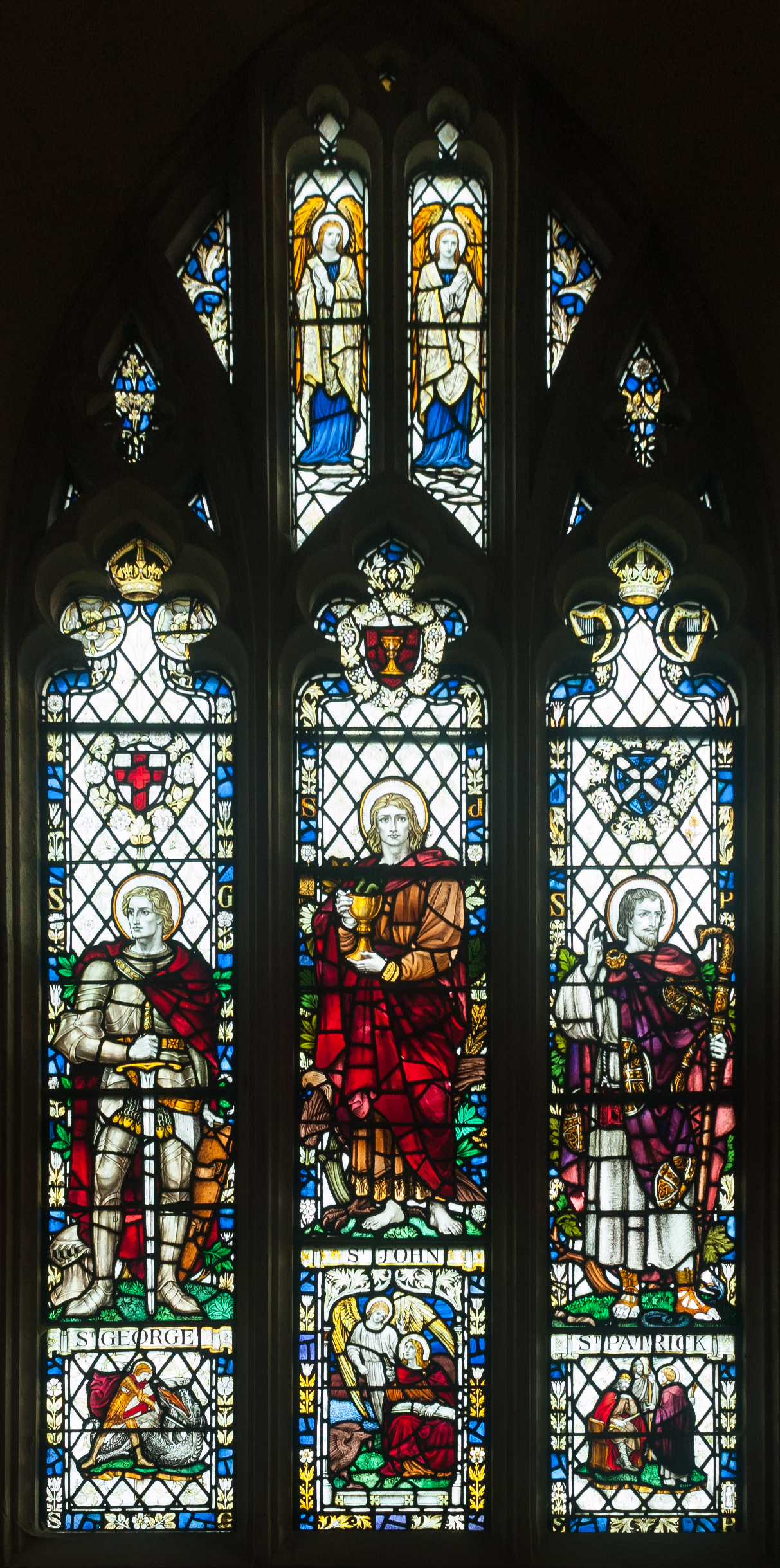
Memorial window of Lord Armaghdale in the south aisle of St. Patrick's Cathedral in Armagh, created by James Humphries Hogan of James Powell and Sons c. 1925

A memorial stained glass was donated by his wife which was installed in the west-most window of the south aisle in St. Patrick's Cathedral, depicting Saints George, John, and Patrick. Below the window, a memorial tablet with fine Roman lettering was erected which includes his Achievement of Arms.

== Arms ==
Coat of arms of John Lonsdale, 1st Baron Armaghdale
Notes Granted by Nevile Wilkinson, Ulster King of Arms on 7 November 1911 Crest A demi-stag Azure charged with three bezants in pale the forefeet resting on a harp and attired Or. Escutcheon Azure on a pale between two buglehorns Or three hurts. Motto Salus in Fide

== Notes ==
Parliament of the United Kingdom
Preceded by Sir Dunbar Barton	Member of Parliament for Mid Armagh; 1900 – 1918	Succeeded by James Rolston Lonsdale
Honorary titles
Preceded by The Earl of Gosford	Lord Lieutenant of Armagh; 1920–1924	Succeeded by Henry Armstrong
Baronetage of the United Kingdom
New creation	Baronet (of Prince's Gardens and The Pavilion); 1911–1924	Extinct
Preceded by Lever baronets	Lonsdale baronets of Prince's Gardens and The Pavilion; 7 July 1911	Succeeded by Mander baronets
Peerage of the United Kingdom
New creation	Baron Armaghdale; 1918–1924	Extinct
