= John Morrogh =

John Morrogh (1849 - 4 October 1901) was an Irish businessman and politician.

Educated at the Christian Brothers' Schools, Cork, he was involved in the working of the Kimberley diamond mines and became a director of De Beers Consolidated Mines. Making a lot of money in South Africa at the end of the 1860s, he returned to Ireland about 1887 and was proprietor of a woollen manufacturing company, Morrogh Brothers and Co., in Cork.

In a by-election in 1889, he was elected MP for South East Cork, and remained as member for the constituency until resigning in 1893.

== Endnotes ==
Parliament of the United Kingdom
Preceded by John Hooper	Member of Parliament for South East Cork; 1889 – 1893	Succeeded by Andrew Commins
