= 1886 Cardiff Boroughs by-election =

UK Parliamentary by-election

The 1886 Cardiff Boroughs by-election was a parliamentary by-election held for the House of Commons constituency of Cardiff Boroughs comprising the towns of Cardiff, Cowbridge and Llantrisant in South Wales on 27 February 1886.

== Vacancy ==
Under the provisions of the Succession to the Crown Act 1707 and a number of subsequent Acts, MPs appointed to certain ministerial and legal offices were at this time required to seek re-election. The vacancy in the Cardiff Boroughs was caused by the appointment of the sitting Liberal Member of Parliament (MP), Sir Edward James Reed to become a Junior Lord of the Treasury, a formal title held by one of the government's assistant Whips in the House of Commons. Reed had held his Cardiff district seat since 1880 and had previously been Liberal MP for Pembroke.

== Candidates ==
=== Liberals ===
Reed stood again. At the 1885 general election, he had only narrowly held his seat against his Conservative opponent, Henry Harben, formerly the unsuccessful Tory candidate in Norwich in 1880, a Sussex businessman in the insurance industry in London. Reed won by just 140 votes, a meagre 1.2% of the poll.

=== Conservatives ===
This time the Conservatives selected John Talbot Dillwyn-Llewellyn, a 49-year-old land-owner and brother-in-law of former Cabinet Minister Sir Michael Hicks Beach. Dillwyn-Llewellyn seems to have been the only name put forward by the representatives of the various wards making up the constituency, reflecting the reluctance of Conservatives to put themselves forward in Welsh seats.

=== Irish Party ===
It was reported that a meeting of the local Irish Party had been held at which it was decided, almost unanimously, not to stand a candidate of their own but to recommend a vote for Reed. This was confirmed with the receipt of a telegram from T. P. O'Connor, President of the Irish National League in London, by the local Cardiff branch of the League, which read, "Executive of the National League respectfully advise the Irish electors of Cardiff to vote to a man to Sir Edward J Reed, the supporter of Mr Gladstone and justice to Ireland.

== The result ==
The result was re-election for Reed by a majority of 863, a slightly healthier position over the general election of the previous November. The Irish vote may have been a factor. It was reported that the Irish vote had gone against the Liberals in 1885 whereas this time it was decidedly in favour. This is perhaps ironic as Reed was later to defect from the Liberals to the Liberal Unionist Party, the raison d’etre of which was to oppose Irish Home Rule, albeit over the issue of tariff reform.

== Votes ==
1886 Cardiff Boroughs by-election
Party	Candidate	Votes	%	±%
Liberal	Edward James Reed	5,708	54.1	+3.5
Conservative	John Dillwyn-Llewellyn	4,845	45.9	−3.5
Majority		863	8.2	+7.0
Turnout		10,553	83.7	−3.6
Registered electors		12,605		
Liberal hold		Swing	+3.5	

== See also ==
- Lists of United Kingdom by-elections
- United Kingdom by-election records
