= Dunbar Barton =

Anglo-Irish British politician, author and judge

The Right Honourable Sir Dunbar Plunket Barton Bt
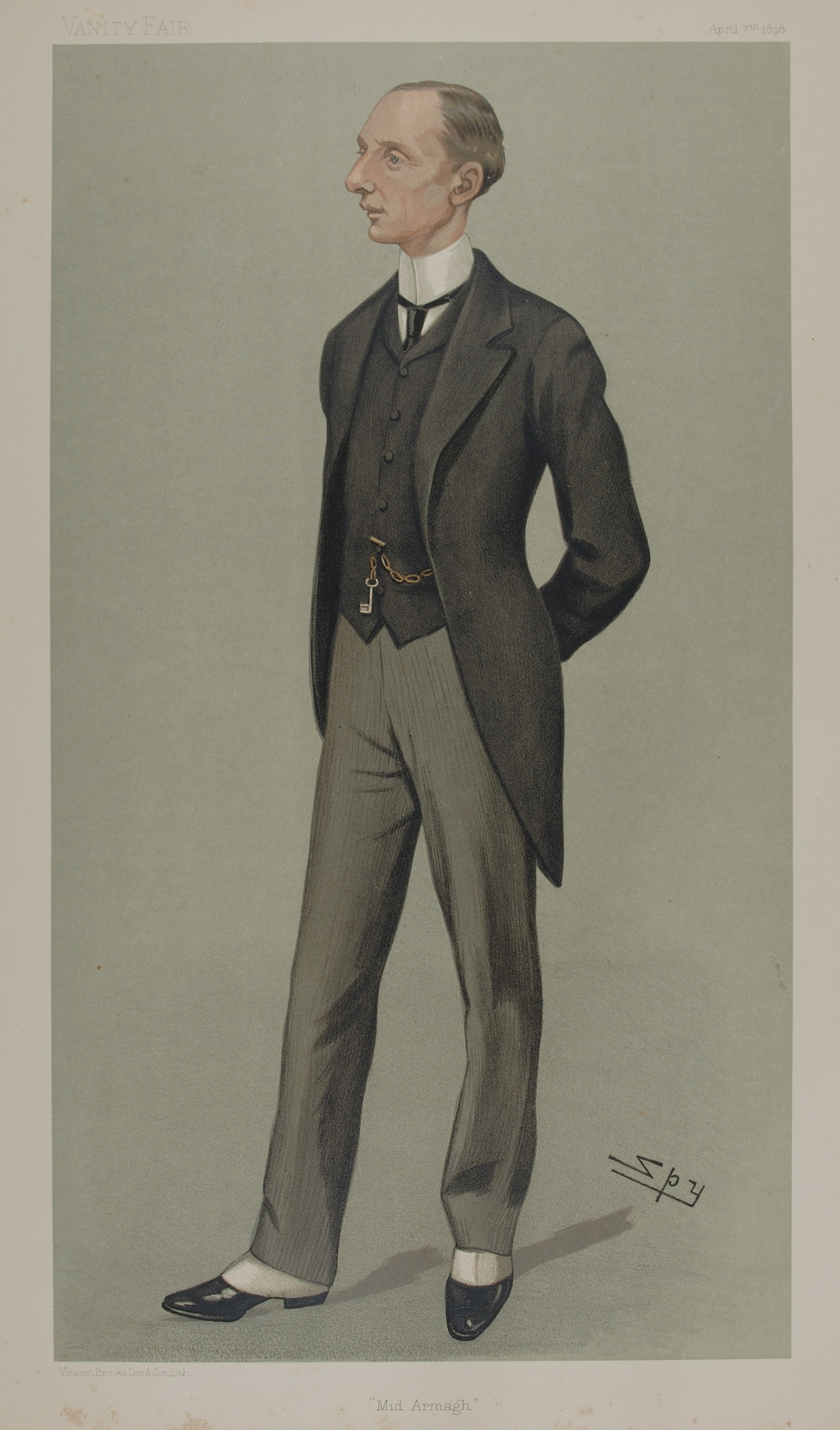
- "Mid Armagh", Barton caricatured by Leslie Ward in Vanity Fair, April 1898.

Judge of the High Court of Justice in Ireland
- In office 1900–1918

MP for Mid Armagh
- In office 1891–1900

Personal details
- Born: October 29, 1853 Merrion Square, Dublin
- Died: September 11, 1937 (aged 83) Gray's Inn Square, London, England
- Party: Irish Unionist
- Spouse: Mary Tottenham Manley
- Children: Dunbar Barton (son)
- Education: Harrow School, Corpus Christi College, Oxford
- Profession: Politician, Author, Judge

Sir Dunbar Plunket Barton, 1st Baronet PC (29 October 1853 – 11 September 1937) was an Anglo-Irish British politician, author and judge.

== Life ==
Barton was born in Merrion Square, Dublin, the eldest son of the magistrate Thomas Henry Barton, a younger son of Dunbar Barton of Rochestown, County Tipperary, who was High Sheriff of Tipperary in 1810. His mother was Hon. Charlotte Plunket, daughter of John Plunket, 3rd Baron Plunket and Charlotte Bushe. Barton was descended from Lord Chief Justice Charles Kendal Bushe; and from the co-founder of the celebrated wine merchants Barton and Guestier.

He attended Harrow and Corpus Christi College, Oxford. Nephew of the Anglican Archbishop of Dublin, Barton was a sincere Protestant, but exceptionally tolerant in all matters of religion: Maurice Healy recalled him quoting a saying of his father that whether one is a Protestant or a Catholic is largely a chance of birth. When Barton was a boy, his father instructed him to guess the distance between his mother's bedroom window and the window at the home next door, to which he guessed 20 ft. "Well, my boy," his father told him, "You are a Protestant; but always remember that if you had been born 20 ft. to the east you would have been a Catholic."

Barton was called to the Irish Bar in 1880, to the English Bar in 1893, from Gray's Inn (of which he was elected Treasurer in 1922), and took silk in 1898. He served as an Irish Unionist Member of Parliament (MP) for Mid Armagh from 1891 to 1900 and was Solicitor-General for Ireland for two years (1898–1900). In January 1900 he was appointed a judge of the Queen's Bench Division of the High Court of Justice in Ireland, to which appointment he was sworn in on 2 February 1900.

In 1904 he was transferred to the Chancery Division where he served until his retirement in 1918. He was created a baronet of Fethard in the County of Tipperary on 28 January 1918: since his only son predeceased him the title became extinct at his death.

Escutcheon of the Barton baronets of Fethard

He married Mary Tottenham Manley in 1900; their only son, Dunbar, died unmarried in 1929. He died at Gray's Inn Square in London in 1937, aged 83. He was a keen historian, with a particular interest in Marshal Bernadotte, and is said to have done much to popularise golf in Ireland. He was president of the Golfing Union of Ireland and of the Royal Dublin Golf Club, Royal Portrush Golf Club, and Greenore Golf Club.

== Works ==
- Timothy Healy: Memories and Anecdotes
- Bernadotte, The First Phase, 1763–1799
- Bernadotte and Napoleon, 1800–1810
- Bernadotte, Prince and King, 1810–1844
- The Amazing Career of Bernadotte, 1763 to 1844
- Links Between Ireland and Shakespeare
- Links Between Shakespeare and the Law
- The Story of the Inns of Court

Parliament of the United Kingdom
Preceded by Sir James Corry, Bt.	Member of Parliament for Mid Armagh; 1891 – 1900	Succeeded by John Lonsdale
Legal offices
Preceded by William Kenny	Solicitor-General for Ireland; 1898–1900	Succeeded by George Wright
Baronetage of the United Kingdom
New creation	Baronet (of Fethard); 1918–1937	Extinct
