= John McKane =

British politician (died 1886)

John McKane (died 11 January 1886) was a British politician. He was the Conservative Member of Parliament (MP) for the Irish constituency of Mid Armagh from the 1885 general election, when the constituency had been created, until his death early the following year.

Parliament of the United Kingdom
New constituency	Member of Parliament for Mid Armagh; 1885 – 1886	Succeeded by Sir James Corry, Bt.
