= John Hooper (Irish politician) =

Irish politician and journalist (1846–1897)

Member of Parliament for South East Cork
- In office December 1885 – June 1889

Personal details
- Born: 1846 Millstreet, County Cork, Ireland
- Died: 23 November 1897 (aged 50–51) Dublin, Ireland
- Party: Irish Parliamentary Party
- Spouse: Mary Jane Buckley (m. 1870)
- Children: 10, including Patrick and William

John Hooper (1846 – 23 November 1897) was an Irish nationalist journalist, politician and MP in the House of Commons of the United Kingdom, and as member of the Irish Parliamentary Party represented South-East Cork from 1885 to 1889.

He began his career on the Cork Herald, and later joined the staff of the Freeman's Journal, serving as its Parliamentary correspondent for a considerable time. He entered parliament in 1885 under the auspices of Charles Stewart Parnell. He was a member of Cork City Council from 1883 to 1890.

In December 1887, he was imprisoned in Tullamore prison, along with Timothy Daniel Sullivan for publishing reports of suppressed branches of the Irish National League. He remained in parliament until he retired from politics in 1889. At the time of his death he was editor of Dublin's Evening Telegraph.

He is mentioned in James Joyce's Ulysses when a matrimonial gift of a stuffed owl given by "Alderman Hooper" is described along with a number of items sitting on a mantelpiece.

Two of his sons, William and Richard won International soccer caps for Ireland. Another of his sons, John, was the first Director of Statistics in the Irish Free State. His eldest son Patrick Hooper, edited the Freeman's Journal. and served as a senator. Hooper is buried in Glasnevin Cemetery, Dublin.

Parliament of the United Kingdom
New constituency	Member of Parliament for South East Cork; 1885–1889	Succeeded by John Morrogh
