= List of United Kingdom Parliament constituencies (1885–1918) =

List of constituencies

Constituencies in 1868–1885 | 1885 MPs | 1886 MPs | 1892 MPs | 1895 MPs | 1900 MPs | 1906 MPs | January 1910 MPs | December 1910 MPs | Constituencies in 1918–1945

This is a list of all constituencies that were in existence in the 1885, 1886, 1892, 1895, 1900, 1906, January 1910, and December 1910 general elections.

== A ==
Constituency	County	Country	Type	Successor
Aberdeen North	Aberdeenshire	Scotland	borough	
Aberdeen South	Aberdeenshire	Scotland	borough	
Aberdeenshire East	Aberdeenshire	Scotland	county	
Aberdeenshire West	Aberdeenshire	Scotland	county	
Abingdon	Berkshire	England	county	
Accrington	Lancashire	England	county	
Altrincham	Cheshire	England	county	
Andover	Hampshire	England	county	
Anglesey	Anglesey	Wales	county	
Antrim East	Antrim	Ireland	county	
Antrim Mid	Antrim	Ireland	county	
Antrim North	Antrim	Ireland	county	
Antrim South	Ireland	Antrim	county	
Appleby	Westmorland	England	county	
Arfon	Carnarvonshire	Wales	county	
Argyllshire	Argyllshire	Scotland	county	
Armagh Mid	Armagh	Ireland	county	
Armagh North	Armagh	Ireland	county	
Armagh South	Armagh	Ireland	county	
Ashburton	Devonshire	England	county	
Ashford	Kent	England	county	
Ashton-under-Lyne	Lancashire	England	borough	
Aston Manor	Warwickshire	England	borough	
Aylesbury	Buckinghamshire	England	county	
Ayr Burghs	Argyllshire, Ayrshire, Buteshire	Scotland	district of burghs	
Ayrshire North	Ayrshire	Scotland	county	
Ayrshire South	Ayrshire	Scotland	county	

== B ==
Constituency	County	Country	Type	Successor
Banbury	Oxfordshire	England	county	
Banffshire	Banffshire	Scotland	county	
Barkston Ash	West Riding of Yorkshire	England	county	
Barnard Castle	Durham	England	county	
Barnsley	West Riding of Yorkshire	England	county	
Barnstaple	Devonshire	England	county	
Barrow-in-Furness	Lancashire	England	borough	
Basingstoke	Hampshire	England	county	
Bassetlaw	Nottinghamshire	England	county	
Bath (2 members)	Somerset	England	borough	
Battersea	London	England	borough	
Bedford	Bedfordshire	England	borough	
Belfast East	Antrim	Ireland	borough	
Belfast North	Antrim	Ireland	borough	
Belfast South	Antrim	Ireland	borough	
Belfast West	Antrim	Ireland	borough	
Bermondsey	London	England	borough	
Berwick upon Tweed	Northumberland	England	county	
Berwickshire	Berwickshire	Scotland	county	
Bethnal Green North East	London	England	borough	
Bethnal Green South West	London	England	borough	
Bewdley	Worcestershire			
Biggleswade	Bedfordshire			
Birkenhead	Cheshire			
Birmingham Bordesley	Warwickshire			
Birmingham Central	Warwickshire			
Birmingham East	Warwickshire			
Birmingham Edgbaston	Warwickshire			
Birmingham North	Warwickshire			
Birmingham South	Warwickshire			
Birmingham West	Warwickshire			
Birr	King's County			
Bishop Auckland	Durham			
Blackburn (2 members)	Lancashire			
Blackpool	Lancashire			
Bodmin	Cornwall			
Bolton (2 members)	Lancashire			
Bootle	Lancashire			
Boston	Lincolnshire			
Bosworth	Leicestershire			
Bow and Bromley	London			
Bradford Central	West Riding of Yorkshire			
Bradford East	West Riding of Yorkshire			
Bradford West	West Riding of Yorkshire			
Brecknockshire	Brecknockshire			
Brentford	Middlesex			
Bridgwater	Somerset			
Brigg	Lincolnshire			
Brighton (2 members)	Sussex			
Bristol East	Gloucestershire			
Bristol North	Gloucestershire			
Bristol South	Gloucestershire			
Bristol West	Gloucestershire			
Brixton	London			
Buckingham	Buckinghamshire			
Buckrose	East Riding of Yorkshire			
Burnley	Lancashire			
Burton	Staffordshire			
Bury	Lancashire			
Bury St Edmunds	Suffolk			
Buteshire	Buteshire			

== C ==
Constituency	County	Successor
Caithness	Caithness	
Camberwell North	London	
Camborne	Cornwall	
Cambridge	Cambridgeshire	
Cambridge University (2 members)	university constituency	
Canterbury	Kent	
Cardiff	Glamorganshire	
Cardiganshire	Cardiganshire	
Carlisle	Cumberland	
Carlow	Carlow	
Carmarthen	Carmarthenshire	
Carmarthenshire East	Carmarthenshire	
Carmarthenshire West	Carmarthenshire	
Carnarvon Burghs	Carnarvonshire	
Cavan East	Cavan	
Cavan West	Cavan	
Chatham	Kent	
Chelmsford	Essex	
Chelsea	London	
Cheltenham	Gloucestershire	
Chertsey	Surrey	
Chester	Cheshire	
Chesterfield	Derbyshire	
Chester-le-Street	Durham	
Chesterton	Cambridgeshire	
Chichester	Sussex	
Chippenham	Wiltshire	
Chorley	Lancashire	
Christchurch	Hampshire	
Cirencester	Gloucestershire	
Clackmannanshire and Kinross-shire	Clackmannanshire and Kinross-shire	
Clapham	London	
Clare East	Clare	
Clare West	Clare	
Cleveland	North Riding of Yorkshire	
Clitheroe	Lancashire	
Cockermouth	Cumberland	
Colchester	Essex	
Colne Valley	West Riding of Yorkshire	
Connemara	Galway	
Cork City (2 members)	Cork	
Cork East	Cork	
Cork Mid	Cork	
Cork North	Cork	
Cork North East	Cork	
Cork South	Cork	
Cork South East	Cork	
Cork West	Cork	
Coventry	Warwickshire	
Crewe	Cheshire	
Cricklade	Wiltshire	
Croydon	Surrey	

== D ==
Constituency	County	Successor
Darlington	Durham	
Dartford	Kent	
Darwen	Lancashire	
Denbigh Boroughs	Denbighshire	
Denbighshire East	Denbighshire	
Denbighshire West	Denbighshire	
Deptford	London	
Derby (2 members)	Derbyshire	
Derbyshire Mid	Derbyshire	
Derbyshire North East	Derbyshire	
Derbyshire South	Derbyshire	
Derbyshire West	Derbyshire	
Devizes	Wiltshire	
Devonport (2 members)	Devonshire	
Dewsbury	West Riding of Yorkshire	
Doncaster	West Riding of Yorkshire	
Donegal East	Donegal	
Donegal North	Donegal	
Donegal South	Donegal	
Donegal West	Donegal	
Dorset East	Dorset	
Dorset North	Dorset	
Dorset South	Dorset	
Dorset West	Dorset	
Dover	Kent	
Down East	Down	
Down North	Down	
Down South	Down	
Down West	Down	
Droitwich	Worcestershire	
Dublin College Green	Dublin	
Dublin Harbour	Dublin	
Dublin North	Dublin	
Dublin St Patrick's	Dublin	
Dublin St Stephen's Green	Dublin	
Dublin South	Dublin	
Dublin University (2 members)	university constituency	
Dudley	Worcestershire	
Dulwich	London	
Dumfries Burghs	Dumfriesshire, Kirkcudbrightshire	
Dumfriesshire	Dumfriesshire	
Dunbartonshire	Dunbartonshire	
Dundee (2 members)	Forfarshire	
Durham City	Durham	
Durham Mid	Durham	
Durham North West	Durham	
Durham South East	Durham	

== E ==
Constituency	County	Successor
Ealing	Middlesex	
East Grinstead	Sussex	
Eastbourne	Sussex	
Eccles	Lancashire	
Eddisbury	Cheshire	
Edinburgh and St Andrews Universities	university constituency	
Edinburgh Central	Midlothian	
Edinburgh East	Midlothian	
Edinburgh South	Midlothian	
Edinburgh West	Midlothian	
Egremont	Cumberland	
Eifion	Carnarvonshire	
Elgin Burghs	Aberdeenshire, Banffshire, Elginshire	
Elginshire and Nairnshire	Elginshire and Nairnshire	
Elland	West Riding of Yorkshire	
Enfield	Middlesex	
Epping	Essex	
Epsom	Surrey	
Eskdale	Cumberland	
Essex South East	Essex	
Evesham	Worcestershire	
Exeter	Devonshire	
Eye	Suffolk	

== F ==
Constituency	County	Successor
Falkirk Burghs	Lanarkshire, Linlithgowshire, Stirlingshire	
Fareham	Hampshire	
Farnworth	Lancashire	
Faversham	Kent	
Fermanagh North	Fermanagh	
Fermanagh South	County Fermanagh	
Fife East	Fife	
Fife West	Fife	
Finsbury Central	London	
Finsbury East	London	
Flint	Flintshire	
Flintshire	Flintshire	
Forest of Dean	Gloucestershire	
Forfarshire	Forfarshire	
Frome	Somerset	
Fulham	London	

== G ==
Constituency	County	Successor
Gainsborough	Lincolnshire	
Galway City	Galway	
Galway East	Galway	
Galway North	Galway	
Galway South	Galway	
Gateshead	Durham	
Glamorganshire East	Glamorganshire	
Glamorganshire Mid	Glamorganshire	
Glamorganshire South	Glamorganshire	
Glasgow and Aberdeen Universities	university constituency	
Glasgow Blackfriars and Hutchesontown	Lanarkshire	
Glasgow Bridgeton	Lanarkshire	
Glasgow Camlachie	Lanarkshire	
Glasgow Central	Lanarkshire	
Glasgow College	Lanarkshire	
Glasgow St Rollox	Lanarkshire	
Glasgow Tradeston	Lanarkshire	
Gloucester	Gloucestershire	
Gorton	Lancashire	
Govan	Lanarkshire	
Gower	Glamorganshire	
Grantham	Lincolnshire	
Gravesend	Kent	
Greenock	Renfrewshire	
Greenwich	London	
Grimsby	Lincolnshire	
Guildford	Surrey	

== H ==
Constituency	County	Successor
Hackney Central	London	
Hackney North	London	
Hackney South	London	
Haddingtonshire	Haddingtonshire	
Haggerston	London	
Halifax (2 members)	West Riding of Yorkshire	
Hallamshire	West Riding of Yorkshire	
Hammersmith	London	
Hampstead	London	
Handsworth	Staffordshire	
Hanley	Staffordshire	
Harborough	Leicestershire	
Harrow	Middlesex	
The Hartlepools	Durham	
Harwich	Essex	
Hastings	Sussex	
Hawick Burghs	Roxburghshire, Selkirkshire	
Henley	Oxfordshire	
Hereford	Herefordshire	
Hertford	Hertfordshire	
Hexham	Northumberland	
Heywood	Lancashire	
High Peak	Derbyshire	
Hitchin	Hertfordshire	
Holborn	London	
Holderness	East Riding of Yorkshire	
Holmfirth	West Riding of Yorkshire	
Honiton	Devonshire	
Horncastle	Lincolnshire	
Hornsey	Middlesex	
Horsham	Sussex	
Houghton-le-Spring	Durham	
Howdenshire	East Riding of Yorkshire	
Hoxton	London	
Huddersfield	West Riding of Yorkshire	
Huntingdon	Huntingdonshire	
Hyde	Cheshire	
Hythe	Kent	

== I ==
Constituency	County	Successor
Ilkeston	Derbyshire	
Ince	Lancashire	
Inverness Burghs	Elginshire, Inverness-shire, Nairnshire, Ross-shire	
Inverness-shire	Inverness-shire	
Ipswich (2 members)	Suffolk	
Isle of Thanet	Kent	
Isle of Wight	Hampshire	
Islington East	London	
Islington North	London	
Islington South	London	
Islington West	London	

== J ==
Constituency	County	Successor
Jarrow	Durham	

== K ==
Constituency	County	Successor
Keighley	West Riding of Yorkshire	
Kendal	Westmorland	
Kennington	London	
Kensington North	London	
Kensington South	London	
Kerry East	Kerry	
Kerry North	Kerry	
Kerry South	Kerry	
Kerry West	Kerry	
Kidderminster	Worcestershire	
Kildare North	Kildare	
Kildare South	Kildare	
Kilkenny City	Kilkenny	
Kilkenny North	Kilkenny	
Kilkenny South	Kilkenny	
Kilmarnock Burghs	Ayrshire, Dunbartonshire, Lanarkshire, Renfrewshire	
Kincardineshire	Kincardineshire	
King's Lynn	Norfolk	
Kingston upon Hull Central	East Riding of Yorkshire	
Kingston upon Hull East	East Riding of Yorkshire	
Kingston upon Hull West	East Riding of Yorkshire	
Kingston-upon-Thames	Surrey	
Kingswinford	Staffordshire	
Kirkcaldy Burghs	Fife	
Kirkcudbright	Kirkcudbrightshire	
Knutsford	Cheshire	

== L ==
Constituency	County	Successor
Lambeth North	London	
Lanarkshire Mid	Lanarkshire	
Lanarkshire North East	Lanarkshire	
Lanarkshire North West	Lanarkshire	
Lanarkshire South	Lanarkshire	
Lancaster	Lancashire	
Launceston	Cornwall	
Leeds Central	West Riding of Yorkshire	
Leeds East	West Riding of Yorkshire	
Leeds North	West Riding of Yorkshire	
Leeds South	West Riding of Yorkshire	
Leeds West	West Riding of Yorkshire	
Leek	Staffordshire	
Leicester (2 members)	Leicestershire	
Leigh	Lancashire	
Leith Burghs	Midlothian	
Leitrim North	Leitrim	
Leitrim South	Leitrim	
Leix	Queen's	
Leominster	Herefordshire	
Lewes	Sussex	
Lewisham	London	
Lichfield	Staffordshire	
Limehouse	London	
Limerick City	Limerick	
Limerick East	Limerick	
Limerick West	Limerick	
Lincoln	Lincolnshire	
Linlithgowshire	Linlithgowshire	
Liverpool Abercromby	Lancashire	
Liverpool East Toxteth	Lancashire	
Liverpool Everton	Lancashire	
Liverpool Exchange	Lancashire	
Liverpool Kirkdale	Lancashire	
Liverpool Scotland	Lancashire	
Liverpool Walton	Lancashire	
Liverpool West Derby	Lancashire	
Liverpool West Toxteth	Lancashire	
London (2 members)	City of London	
London University	university constituency	
Londonderry City	Londonderry	
Londonderry North	Londonderry	
Londonderry South	Londonderry	
Longford North	Longford	
Longford South	Longford	
Loughborough	Leicestershire	
Louth	Lincolnshire	
Louth North	Louth	
Louth South	Louth	
Lowestoft	Suffolk	
Ludlow	Shropshire	
Luton	Bedfordshire	

== M ==
Constituency	County	Successor
Macclesfield	Cheshire	
Maidstone	Kent	
Maldon	Essex	
Manchester East	Lancashire	
Manchester North	Lancashire	
Manchester North East	Lancashire	
Manchester North West	Lancashire	
Manchester South	Lancashire	
Manchester South West	Lancashire	
Mansfield	Nottinghamshire	
Marylebone East	London	
Marylebone West	London	
Mayo East	Mayo	
Mayo North	Mayo	
Mayo South	Mayo	
Mayo West	Mayo	
Meath North	Meath	
Meath South	Meath	
Medway	Kent	
Melton	Leicestershire	
Merioneth	Merionethshire	
Merthyr Tydvil (2 members)	Glamorganshire	
Middlesbrough	North Riding of Yorkshire	
Middleton	Lancashire	
Midlothian	Midlothian	
Mile End	London	
Monaghan North	Monaghan	
Monaghan South	Monaghan	
Monmouth	Monmouthshire	
Monmouthshire North	Monmouthshire	
Monmouthshire South	Monmouthshire	
Monmouthshire West	Monmouthshire	
Montgomery	Montgomeryshire	
Montgomeryshire	Montgomeryshire	
Montrose Burghs	Aberdeenshire, Forfarshire	
Morley	West Riding of Yorkshire	
Morpeth	Northumberland	

== N ==
Constituency	County	Successor
New Forest	Hampshire	
Newark	Nottinghamshire	
Newbury	Berkshire	
Newcastle-under-Lyme	Staffordshire	
Newcastle-upon-Tyne (2 members)	Northumberland	
Newington West	County of London	
Newmarket	Cambridgeshire	
Newport	Shropshire	
Newry	Down	
Newton	Lancashire	
Norfolk East	Norfolk	
Norfolk Mid	Norfolk	
Norfolk North	Norfolk	
Norfolk North West	Norfolk	
Norfolk South	Norfolk	
Norfolk South West	Norfolk	
Normanton	West Riding of Yorkshire	
North Lonsdale	Lancashire	
Northampton (2 members)	Northamptonshire	
Northamptonshire East	Northamptonshire	
Northamptonshire Mid	Northamptonshire	
Northamptonshire North	Northamptonshire	
Northamptonshire South	Northamptonshire	
Northwich	Cheshire	
Norwich (2 members)	Norfolk	
Norwood	Surrey	
Nottingham East	Nottinghamshire	
Nottingham South	Nottinghamshire	
Nottingham West	Nottinghamshire	
Nuneaton	Warwickshire	

== O ==
Constituency	County	Successor
Oldham (2 members)	Lancashire	
Orkney and Shetland	Orkney and Shetland	
Ormskirk	Lancashire	
Osgoldcross	West Riding of Yorkshire	
Ossory	Queen's	
Oswestry	Shropshire	
Otley	West Riding of Yorkshire	
Oxford	Oxfordshire	
Oxford University (2 members)	university constituency	

== P ==
Constituency	County	Successor
Paddington North	London	
Paddington South	London	
Paisley	Renfrewshire	
Partick	Lanarkshire	
Peckham	London	
Peebles and Selkirk	Peeblesshire, Selkirkshire	
Pembroke and Haverfordwest	Pembrokeshire	
Pembrokeshire	Pembrokeshire	
Penrith	Cumberland	
Penryn and Falmouth	Cornwall	
Perth	Perthshire	
Perthshire East	Perthshire	
Perthshire West	Perthshire	
Peterborough	Northamptonshire	
Petersfield	Hampshire	
Plymouth (2 members)	Devonshire	
Pontefract	West Riding of Yorkshire	
Poplar	London	
Portsmouth (2 members)	Hampshire	
Preston (2 members)	Lancashire	
Prestwich	Lancashire	
Pudsey	West Riding of Yorkshire	

== R ==
Constituency	County	Successor
Radcliffe-cum-Farnworth	Lancashire	
Radnorshire	Radnorshire	
Ramsey	Huntingdonshire	
Reading	Berkshire	
Reigate	Surrey	
Renfrewshire East	Renfrewshire	
Renfrewshire West	Renfrewshire	
Rhondda	Glamorganshire	
Richmond	North Riding of Yorkshire	
Ripon	West Riding of Yorkshire	
Rochdale	Lancashire	
Rochester	Kent	
Romford	Essex	
Roscommon North	Roscommon	
Roscommon South	Roscommon	
Ross	Herefordshire	
Ross and Cromarty	Ross-shire and Cromartyshire	
Rossendale	Lancashire	
Rotherham	West Riding of Yorkshire	
Rotherhithe	London	
Roxburghshire	Roxburghshire	
Rugby	Warwickshire	
Rushcliffe	Nottinghamshire	
Rutland	Rutland	
Rye	Sussex	

== S ==
Constituency	County	Successor
Saffron Walden	Essex	
St Albans	Hertfordshire	
St Andrews Burghs	Fife	
St Augustine's	Kent	
St Austell	Cornwall	
St George	London	
St George's, Hanover Square	London	
St Helens	Lancashire	
St Ives	Cornwall	
St Pancras East	London	
St Pancras North	London	
St Pancras South	London	
St Pancras West	London	
Salford North	Lancashire	
Salford South	Lancashire	
Salford West	Lancashire	
Salisbury	Wiltshire	
Scarborough	North Riding of Yorkshire	
Sevenoaks	Kent	
Sheffield Attercliffe	West Riding of Yorkshire	
Sheffield Brightside	West Riding of Yorkshire	
Sheffield Central	West Riding of Yorkshire	
Sheffield Ecclesall	West Riding of Yorkshire	
Sheffield Hallam	West Riding of Yorkshire	
Shipley	West Riding of Yorkshire	
Shrewsbury	Shropshire	
Skipton	West Riding of Yorkshire	
Sleaford	Lincolnshire	
Sligo North	Sligo	
Sligo South	Sligo	
Somerset East	Somerset	
Somerset North	Somerset	
Somerset South	Somerset	
South Molton	Devonshire	
South Shields	Durham	
Southampton (2 members)	Hampshire	
Southport	Lancashire	
Southwark West	London	
Sowerby	West Riding of Yorkshire	
Spalding	Lincolnshire	
Spen Valley	West Riding of Yorkshire	
Stafford	Staffordshire	
Staffordshire North West	Staffordshire	
Staffordshire West	Staffordshire	
Stalybridge	Lancashire	
Stamford	Lincolnshire	
Stepney	London	
Stirling Burghs	Fife, Linlithgowshire, Perthshire, Stirlingshire	
Stirlingshire	Stirlingshire	
Stockport (2 members)	Cheshire	
Stockton	Durham	
Stoke upon Trent	Staffordshire	
Stowmarket	Suffolk	
Strand	London	
Stratford upon Avon	Warwickshire	
Stretford	Lancashire	
Stroud	Gloucestershire	
Sudbury	Suffolk	
Sunderland (2 members)	Durham	
Sutherland	Sutherland	
Swansea	Glamorganshire	
Swansea District	Glamorganshire	

== T ==
Constituency	County	Successor
Tamworth	Staffordshire	
Taunton	Somerset	
Tavistock	Devonshire	
Tewkesbury	Gloucestershire	
Thirsk and Malton	North Riding of Yorkshire	
Thornbury	Gloucestershire	
Tipperary East	Tipperary	
Tipperary Mid	Tipperary	
Tipperary North	Tipperary	
Tipperary South	Tipperary	
Tiverton	Devonshire	
Torquay	Devonshire	
Totnes	Devonshire	
Tottenham	Middlesex	
Truro	Cornwall	
Tullamore	King's County	
Tunbridge	Kent	
Tynemouth	Northumberland	
Tyneside	Northumberland	
Tyrone East	Tyrone	
Tyrone Mid	Tyrone	
Tyrone North	Tyrone	
Tyrone South	Tyrone	

== U ==
Constituency	County	Successor
Uxbridge	Middlesex	

== W ==
Constituency	County	Successor
Wakefield	West Riding of Yorkshire	
Walsall	Staffordshire	
Walthamstow	Essex	
Walworth	London	
Wandsworth	London	
Wansbeck	Northumberland	
Warrington	Lancashire	
Warwick and Leamington	Warwickshire	
Waterford City	Waterford	
Waterford East	Waterford	
Waterford West	Waterford	
Watford	Hertfordshire	
Wednesbury	Staffordshire	
Wellington, Shropshire	Shropshire	
Wellington, Somerset	Somerset	
Wells	Somerset	
West Bromwich	Staffordshire	
West Ham North	Essex	
West Ham South	Essex	
Westbury	Wiltshire	
Westhoughton	Lancashire	
Westmeath North	Westmeath	
Westmeath South	Westmeath	
Westminster	London	
Wexford North	Wexford	
Wexford South	Wexford	
Whitby	North Riding of Yorkshire	
Whitechapel	London	
Whitehaven	Cumberland	
Wick Burghs	Caithness, Cromartyshire, Orkney, Ross-shire, Sutherland	
Wicklow East	Wicklow	
Wicklow West	Wicklow	
Widnes	Lancashire	
Wigan	Lancashire	
Wigtownshire	Wigtownshire	
Wilton	Wiltshire	
Wimbledon	Surrey	
Winchester	Hampshire	
Windsor	Berkshire	
Wirral	Cheshire	
Wisbech	Cambridgeshire	
Wokingham	Berkshire	
Wolverhampton East	Staffordshire	
Wolverhampton South	Staffordshire	
Wolverhampton West	Staffordshire	
Woodbridge	Suffolk	
Woodstock	Oxfordshire	
Woolwich	London	
Worcester	Worcestershire	
Worcestershire East	Worcestershire	
Worcestershire North	Worcestershire	
Wycombe	Buckinghamshire	

== Y ==
Constituency	County	Successor
Yarmouth	Norfolk	
York	Yorkshire	

== Maps of constituencies ==
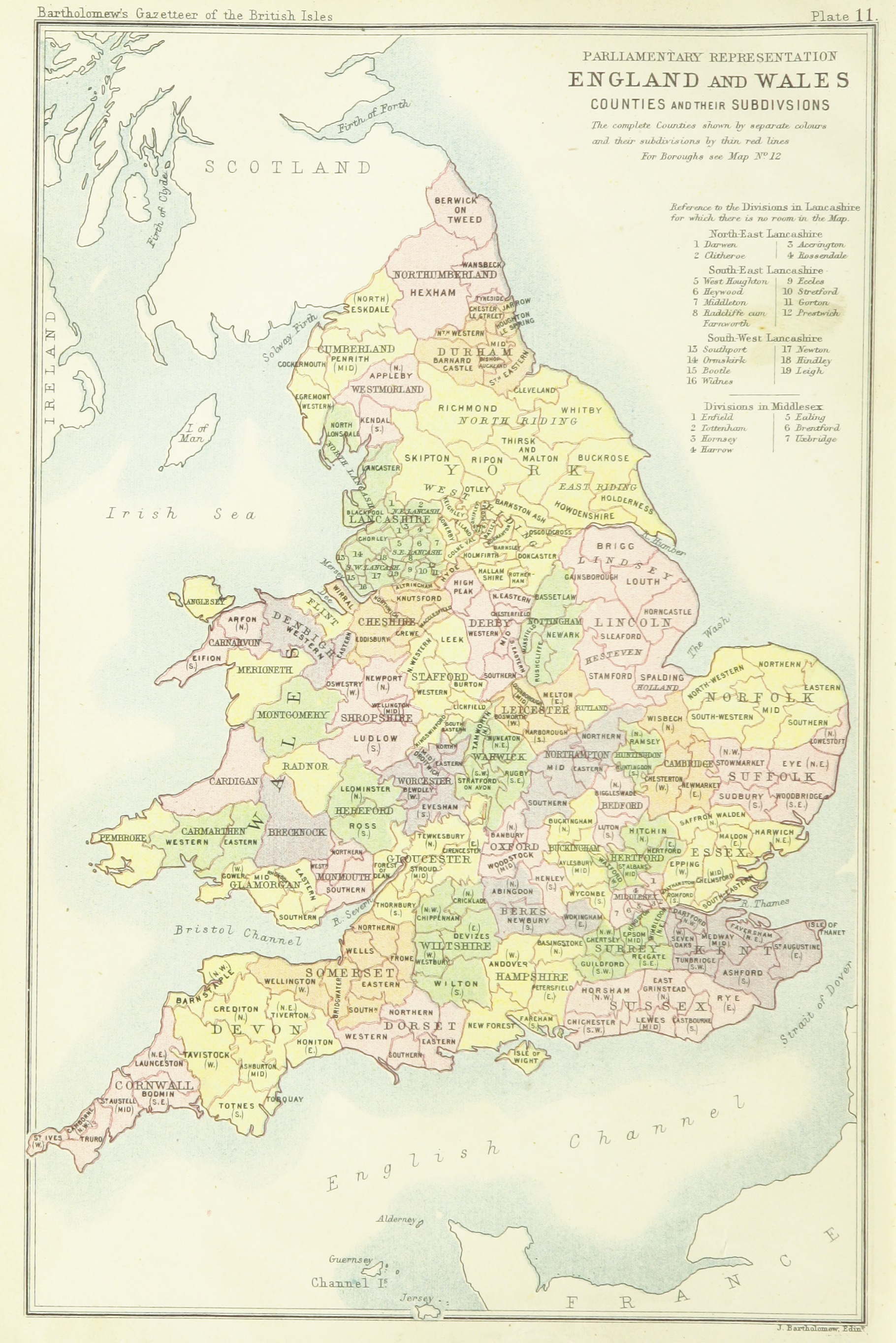
Map of county constituencies in England and Wales

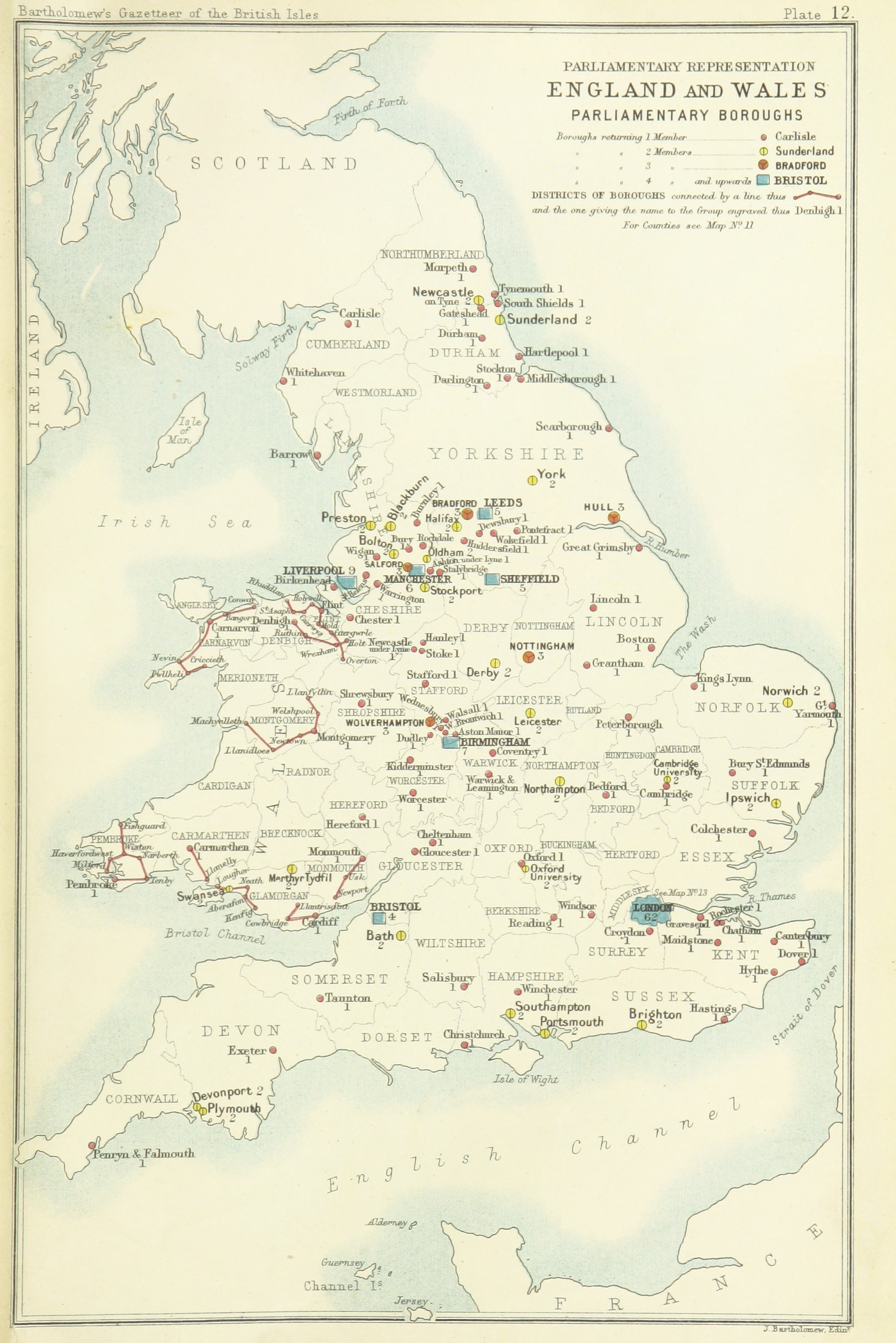
Map of borough constituencies in England and Wales

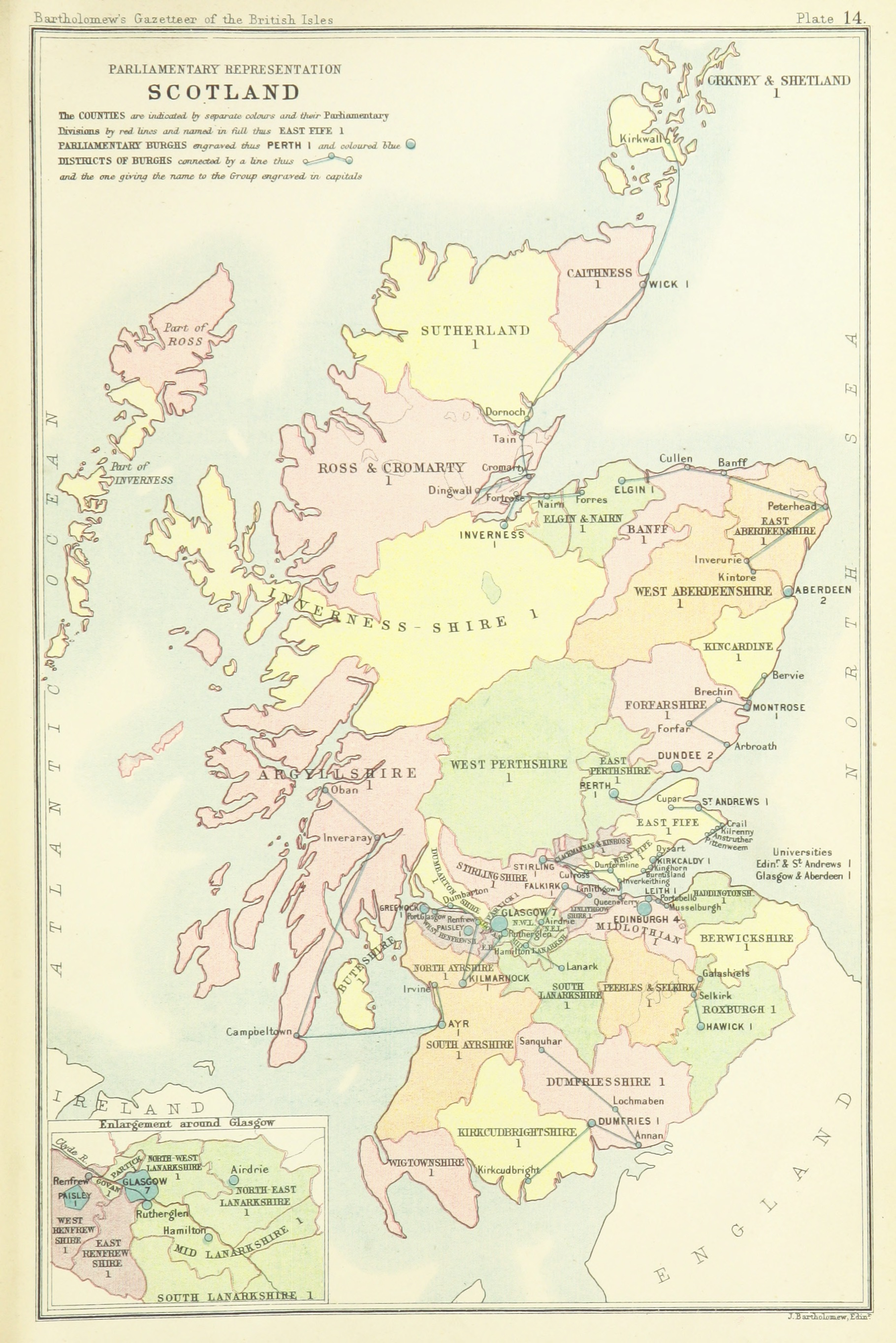
Map of constituencies in Scotland

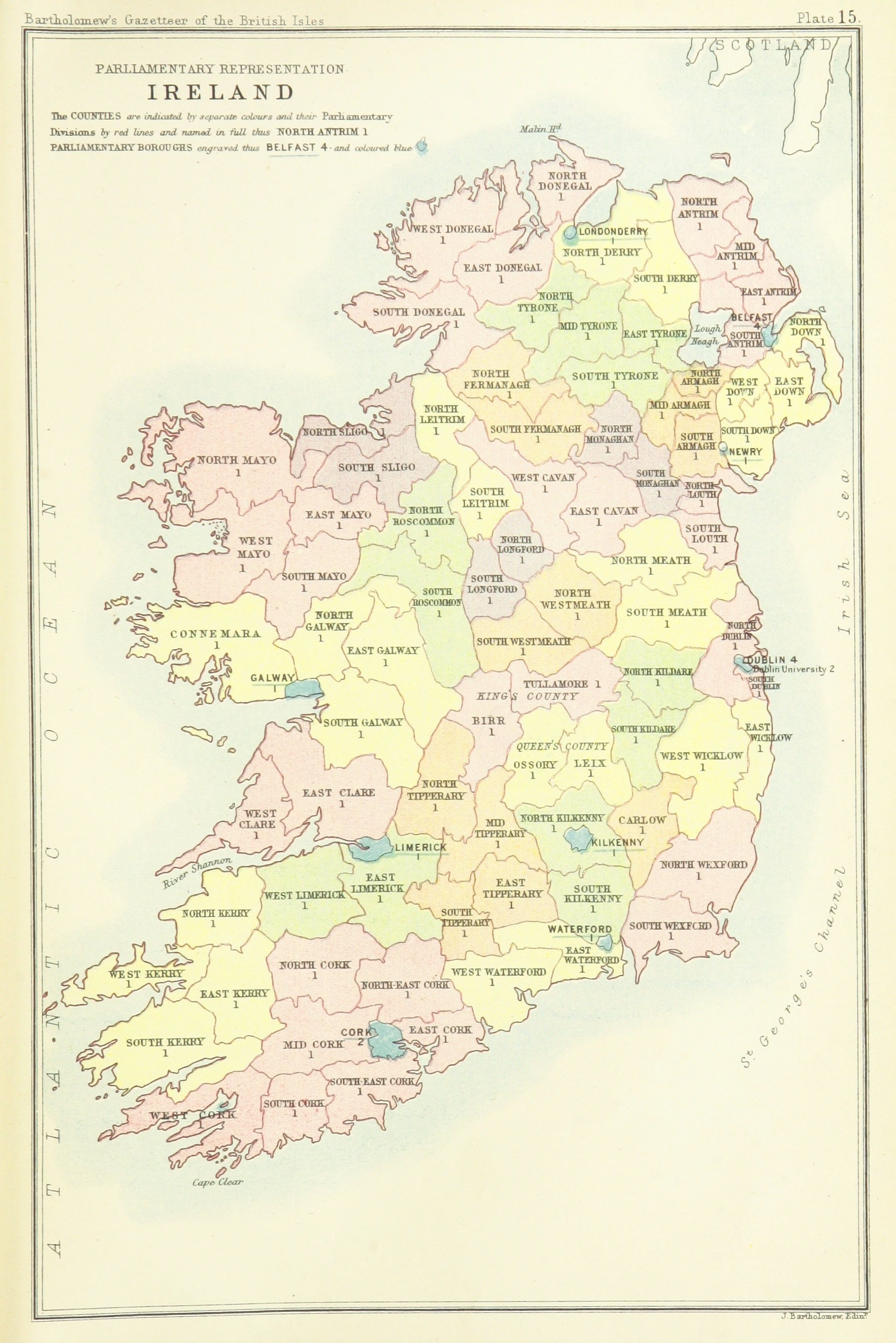
Map of constituencies in Ireland

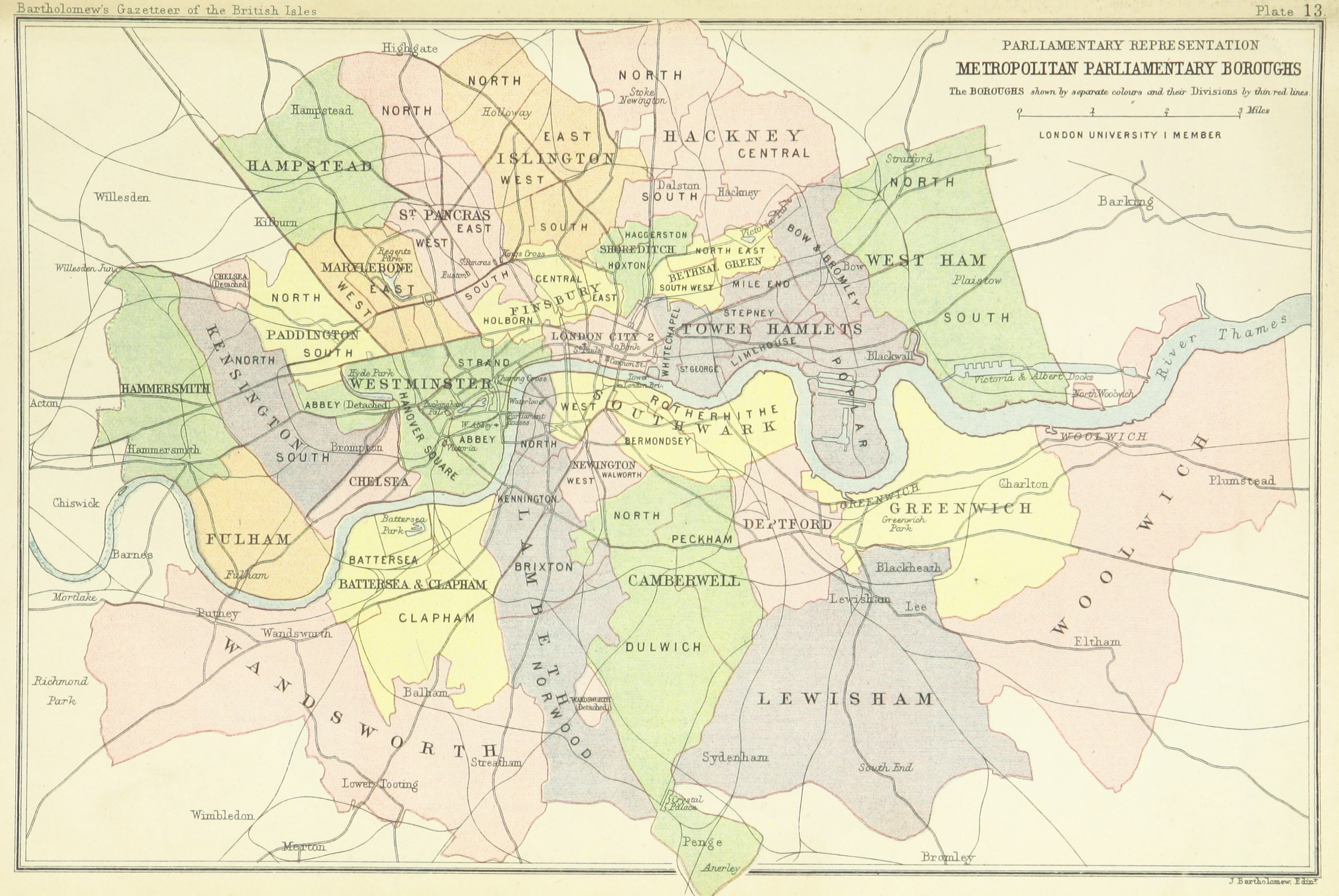
Detail map of constituencies in London
