= List of MPs elected in the December 1910 United Kingdom general election =

December 1910–1918 Parliament of the United Kingdom
←	Jan – Dec 1910 Parliament	1918–1922 Parliament	→
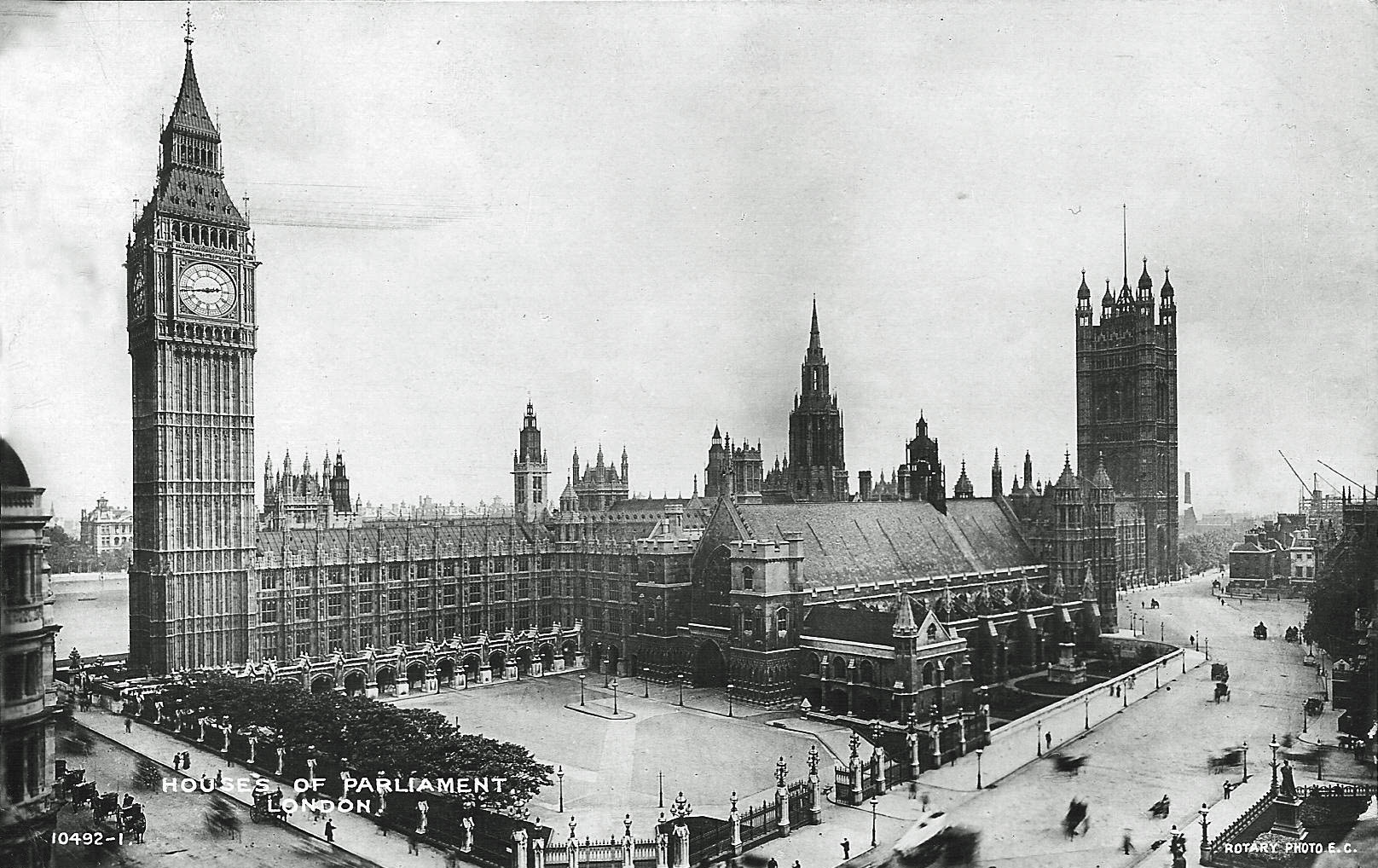
- Palace of Westminster in 1913

Overview
- Legislative body: Parliament of the United Kingdom
- Term: 19 December 1910 – 14 December 1918
- Election: December 1910 United Kingdom general election
- Government: Third Asquith ministry (1910—1915) Fourth Asquith ministry (1915—1916) First Lloyd George coalition ministry (1916—1918)

House of Commons
- Members: 670
- Speaker: James Lowther
- Leader: H. H. Asquith (until 1916); Bonar Law (from 1916)
- Prime Minister: [H. H. Asquith (until 1916); David Lloyd George (from 1916)
- Leader of the Opposition: Arthur Balfour (until 1911) Bonar Law (1911—1915); Sir Edward Carson (1915—1916) H. H. Asquith (1916—1918)

House of Lords
- Lord Chancellor: Robert Reid, 1st Earl Loreburn (until 1912) Richard Haldane, 1st Viscount Haldane (1912—1915); Stanley Buckmaster, 1st Viscount Buckmaster (1915—1916) Robert Finlay, 1st Viscount Finlay (from 1916)
- Leader of the House of Lords: Robert Crewe-Milnes, 1st Marquess of Crewe (until 1916); George Curzon, 1st Marquess Curzon of Kedleston

Crown-in-Parliament George V

Sessions
- 1st: 31 January 1911 – 16 December 1911
- 2nd: 14 February 1912 – 7 March 1913
- 3rd: 10 March 1913 – 15 August 1913
- 4th: 10 February 1914 – 18 September 1914
- 5th: 11 November 1914 – 27 January 1916
- 6th: 15 February 1916 – 22 December 1916
- 7th: 7 February 1917 – 6 February 1918
- 8th: 12 February 1918 – 21 November 1918

This is a list of members of Parliament (MPs) elected at the December 1910 general election, held over several days from 3 December to 19 December 1910.

Table of contents: Floor crossings · By-elections

== MPs ==
Constituency	Member of Parliament	Party
Aberdeen North	Duncan Pirie	Liberal
Aberdeen South	George Esslemont	Liberal
Aberdeenshire East	Henry Cowan	Liberal
Aberdeenshire West	John Henderson	Liberal
Abingdon	Harold Henderson	Conservative
Accrington	Harold Baker	Liberal
Altrincham	John Kebty-Fletcher	Conservative
Andover	Walter Faber	Conservative
Anglesey	Ellis-Griffith, Ellis	Liberal
Antrim East	James McCalmont	Irish Unionist
Antrim Mid	Hon. Arthur O'Neill	Irish Unionist
Antrim North	Peter Kerr-Smiley	Irish Unionist
Antrim South	Charles Craig	Irish Unionist
Appleby	Lancelot Sanderson	Conservative
Arfon	William Jones	Liberal
Argyllshire	Ainsworth, John	Liberal
Armagh Mid	John Lonsdale	Irish Unionist
Armagh North	Moore, William	Irish Unionist
Armagh South	Charles O'Neill	Irish Parliamentary Party
Ashburton	Ernest Morrison-Bell	Liberal Unionist
Ashford	Laurence Hardy	Conservative
Ashton-under-Lyne	Max Aitken	Conservative
Aston Manor	Sir Evelyn Cecil	Conservative
Aylesbury	Lionel de Rothschild	Liberal Unionist
Ayr District of Burghs	Sir George Younger	Conservative
Ayrshire North	Andrew Anderson	Liberal
Ayrshire South	Beale, Sir William	Liberal
Banbury	Hon. Eustace Twisleton-Wykeham-Fiennes	Liberal
Banffshire	Walter Waring	Liberal
Barkston Ash	George Lane-Fox	Conservative
Barnard Castle	Arthur Henderson	Labour
Barnsley	Sir Joseph Walton	Liberal
Barnstaple	Ernest Soares	Liberal
Barrow-in-Furness	Charles Duncan	Labour
Basingstoke	Arthur Salter	Conservative
Bassetlaw	William Hume-Williams	Conservative
Bath	Lord Alexander Thynne	Conservative
Bath	Sir Charles Hunter	Conservative
Battersea	Rt Hon. John Burns	Liberal
Bedford	Frederick Kellaway	Liberal
Belfast East	R. J. McMordie	Irish Unionist
Belfast North	Robert Thompson	Irish Unionist
Belfast South	James Chambers	Irish Unionist
Belfast West	Joseph Devlin	Irish Parliamentary Party
Bermondsey	Harold Glanville	Liberal
Berwick-upon-Tweed	Sir Edward Grey	Liberal
Berwickshire	Harold Tennant	Liberal
Bethnal Green North East	Edwin Cornwall	Liberal
Bethnal Green South West	Edward Pickersgill	Liberal
Bewdley	Stanley Baldwin	Conservative
Biggleswade	Arthur Black	Liberal
Birkenhead	Alfred Bigland	Conservative
Birmingham Bordesley	Jesse Collings	Liberal Unionist
Birmingham Central	Sir Ebenezer Parkes	Liberal Unionist
Birmingham East	Steel-Maitland, Arthur	Conservative
Birmingham Edgbaston	Lowe, Francis	Conservative
Birmingham North	John Middlemore	Liberal Unionist
Birmingham South	Viscount Morpeth	Liberal Unionist
Birmingham West	Joseph Chamberlain	Liberal Unionist
Birr	Michael Reddy	Irish Parliamentary Party
Bishop Auckland	Sir Henry Havelock-Allan	Liberal
Blackburn	Philip Snowden	Labour
Blackburn	Henry Norman	Liberal
Blackpool	Wilfrid Ashley	Conservative
Bodmin	Sir Reginald Pole-Carew	Liberal Unionist
Bolton	George Harwood	Liberal
Bolton	Alfred Henry Gill	Labour
Bootle	Thomas Sandys	Conservative
Boston	Charles Harvey Dixon	Conservative
Bosworth	Henry McLaren	Liberal
Bow and Bromley	George Lansbury	Labour
Bradford Central	Sir George Scott Robertson	Liberal
Bradford East	Sir William Priestley	Liberal
Bradford West	Fred Jowett	Labour
Brecknockshire	Sidney Robinson	Liberal
Brentford	Lord Alwyne Compton	Conservative
Bridgwater	Robert Sanders	Conservative
Brigg	Sir Alfred Gelder	Liberal
Brighton	George Tryon	Conservative
Brighton	Hon. Walter Rice	Conservative
Bristol East	Charles Hobhouse	Liberal
Bristol North	Augustine Birrell	Liberal
Bristol South	Sir Howell Davies	Liberal
Bristol West	George Gibbs	Conservative
Brixton	Davison Dalziel	Conservative
Buckingham	Sir Harry Verney, Bt	Liberal
Buckrose	Sir Luke White	Liberal
Burnley	Philip Morrell	Liberal
Burton	Robert Ratcliff	Liberal Unionist
Bury	Sir George Toulmin	Liberal
Bury St Edmunds	Hon. Walter Guinness	Conservative
Buteshire	Harry Hope	Conservative
Caithness-shire	Harmsworth, Robert	Liberal
Camberwell North	Thomas Macnamara	Liberal
Camborne	Acland, Francis	Liberal
Cambridge	Almeric Paget	Conservative
Cambridge University	Samuel Butcher	Conservative
Cambridge University	John Rawlinson	Conservative
Canterbury	Francis Bennett-Goldney	Independent Conservative
Cardiff	Lord Ninian Crichton-Stuart	Conservative
Cardiganshire	Matthew Vaughan-Davies	Liberal
Carlisle	Richard Denman	Liberal
County Carlow	Michael Molloy	Irish Parliamentary Party
Carmarthen District	W. Llewelyn Williams	Liberal
Carmarthenshire East	Abel Thomas	Liberal
Carmarthenshire West	John Hinds	Liberal
Carnarvon	David Lloyd George	Liberal
Cavan East	Samuel Young	Irish Parliamentary Party
Cavan West	Vincent Kennedy	Irish Parliamentary Party
Chatham	Gerald Hohler	Conservative
Chelmsford	E. G. Pretyman	Conservative
Chelsea	Samuel Hoare	Conservative
Cheltenham	Richard Mathias	Liberal
Chertsey	Donald Macmaster	Conservative
Chester	Robert Yerburgh	Conservative
Chester-le-Street	John Wilkinson Taylor	Labour
Chesterfield	James Haslam	Labour
Chesterton	Hon. Edwin Montagu	Liberal
Chichester	Lord Edmund Talbot	Conservative
Chippenham	George Terrell	Conservative
Chorley	Lord Balniel	Conservative
Christchurch	Henry Page Croft	Conservative
Cirencester	Hon. Benjamin Bathurst	Conservative
Clackmannan and Kinrossshire	Eugene Wason	Liberal
Clapham	Denison Faber	Conservative
Clare East	Willie Redmond	Irish Parliamentary Party
Clare West	Arthur Lynch	Irish Parliamentary Party
Cleveland	Herbert Samuel	Liberal
Clitheroe	Albert Smith	Labour
Cockermouth	Sir Wilfrid Lawson	Liberal
Colchester	Laming Worthington-Evans	Conservative
Colne Valley	Charles Leach	Liberal
Cork City	William O'Brien	All-for-Ireland League
Cork City	Maurice Healy	All-for-Ireland League
County Cork East	Anthony Donelan	Irish Parliamentary Party
County Cork Mid	D. D. Sheehan	All-for-Ireland League
County Cork North	Patrick Guiney	All-for-Ireland League
County Cork North East	Moreton Frewen	All-for-Ireland League
County Cork South	John Walsh	All-for-Ireland League
County Cork South East	Eugene Crean	All-for-Ireland League
County Cork West	James Gilhooly	All-for-Ireland League
Coventry	David Marshall Mason	Liberal
Crewe	Walter McLaren	Liberal
Cricklade	RC Lambert	Liberal
Croydon	Ian Malcolm	Conservative
Darlington	Herbert Pease	Liberal Unionist
Dartford	James Rowlands	Liberal
Darwen	John Rutherford	Conservative
Denbigh District	Hon. William Ormsby-Gore	Conservative
Denbighshire East	Edward John	Liberal
Denbighshire West	Sir John Roberts	Liberal
Deptford	C. W. Bowerman	Labour
Derby	Sir Thomas Roe	Liberal
Derby	J.H. Thomas	Labour
Derbyshire Mid	John Hancock	Labour
Derbyshire North East	W. E. Harvey	Labour
Derbyshire South	Herbert Raphael	Liberal
Derbyshire West	Earl of Kerry	Liberal Unionist
Devizes	Basil Peto	Conservative
Devonport	Sir John Jackson	Conservative
Devonport	Clement Kinloch-Cooke	Conservative
Dewsbury	Walter Runciman	Liberal
Doncaster	Charles Nicholson	Liberal
Donegal East	Edward Kelly	Irish Parliamentary Party
Donegal North	Philip O'Doherty	Irish Parliamentary Party
Donegal South	J. G. Swift MacNeill	Irish Parliamentary Party
Donegal West	Hugh Law	Irish Parliamentary Party
Dorset East	Hon. Freddie Guest	Liberal
Dorset North	Sir Randolf Baker	Conservative
Dorset South	Angus Hambro	Conservative
Dorset West	Robert Williams	Conservative
Dover	George Wyndham	Conservative
Down East	James Craig	Irish Unionist
Down North	William Mitchell-Thomson	Irish Unionist
Down South	Jeremiah McVeagh	Irish Parliamentary Party
Down West	William MacCaw	Irish Unionist
Droitwich	John Lyttelton	Liberal Unionist
Dublin County North	J. J. Clancy	Irish Parliamentary Party
Dublin County South	William Cotton	Irish Parliamentary Party
Dublin College Green	Joseph Nannetti	Irish Parliamentary Party
Dublin Harbour	William Abraham	Irish Parliamentary Party
Dublin St Patrick's	William Field	Irish Parliamentary Party
Dublin St Stephen's Green	P. J. Brady	Irish Parliamentary Party
Dublin University	Sir Edward Carson	Irish Unionist Party
Dublin University	James Campbell	Irish Unionist Party
Dudley	Sir Arthur Griffith-Boscawen	Conservative
Dulwich	Sir Frederick Hall	Conservative
Dumbartonshire	Arthur Acland Allen	Liberal
Dumfries District of Burghs	John Gulland	Liberal
Dumfriesshire	Percy Molteno	Liberal
Dundee	Alexander Wilkie	Labour
Dundee	Winston Churchill	Liberal
Durham	John Hills	Liberal Unionist
Durham Mid	John Wilson	Liberal
Durham North West	Llewellyn Atherley-Jones	Liberal
Durham South East	Evan Hayward	Liberal
Ealing	Herbert Nield	Conservative
East Grinstead	Henry Cautley	Conservative
Eastbourne	Rupert Gwynne	Conservative
Eccles	Sir George Pollard	Liberal
Eddisbury	Harry Barnston	Conservative
Edinburgh Central	Charles Edward Price	Liberal
Edinburgh East	Sir James Gibson	Liberal
Edinburgh South	Charles Lyell	Liberal
Edinburgh West	James Avon Clyde	Liberal Unionist
Edinburgh and St Andrews Universities	Robert Finlay	Liberal Unionist
Egremont	James Augustus Grant	Conservative
Eifion	Ellis Davies	Liberal
Elgin District of Burghs	John Sutherland	Liberal
Elgin and Nairnshires	Archibald Williamson	Liberal
Elland	Charles Trevelyan	Liberal
Enfield	John Pretyman Newman	Conservative
Epping	Amelius Lockwood	Conservative
Epsom	William Keswick	Conservative
Eskdale	Claude Lowther	Conservative
Essex South East	John Kirkwood	Conservative
Evesham	Bolton Eyres-Monsell	Conservative
Exeter	Harold St Maur	Liberal
Eye	Hon. Harold Pearson	Liberal
Falkirk District of Burghs	John Macdonald	Liberal
Fareham	Sir Arthur Lee	Conservative
Faversham	Sir Granville Wheler	Conservative
Fermanagh North	Godfrey Fetherstonhaugh	Irish Unionist
Fermanagh South	Patrick Crumley	Irish Parliamentary Party
Fife East	H. H. Asquith	Liberal
Fife West	William Adamson	Labour
Finsbury Central	Martin Archer-Shee	Conservative
Finsbury East	Joseph Allen Baker	Liberal
Flint District	James Woolley Summers	Liberal
Flintshire	Herbert Lewis	Liberal
Forest of Dean	Sir Charles Dilke	Liberal
Forfarshire	James Falconer	Liberal
Frome	Sir John Barlow	Liberal
Fulham	Hayes Fisher	Conservative
Gainsborough	George Jackson Bentham	Liberal
Galway Borough	Stephen Gwynn	Irish Parliamentary Party
Galway Connemara	William O'Malley	Irish Parliamentary Party
County Galway East	John Roche	Irish Parliamentary Party
County Galway North	Richard Hazleton	Irish Parliamentary Party
County Galway South	William Duffy	Irish Parliamentary Party
Gateshead	Sir Harold Elverston	Liberal
Glamorganshire, East	Clement Edwards	Liberal
Glamorganshire, Mid	Hugh Edwards	Liberal
Glamorganshire, South	William Brace	Labour
Glasgow Blackfriars and Hutchesontown	George Barnes	Labour
Glasgow Bridgeton	MacCallum Scott	Liberal
Glasgow Camlachie	Sir Halford Mackinder	Liberal Unionist
Glasgow Central	Charles Dickson	Conservative
Glasgow College	Harry Watt	Liberal
Glasgow Govan	William Hunter	Liberal
Glasgow St Rollox	McKinnon Wood	Liberal
Glasgow Tradeston	Archibald Corbett	Liberal
Glasgow and Aberdeen Universities	Henry Craik	Conservative
Gloucester	Henry Terrell	Conservative
Gorton	John Hodge	Labour
Gower District	John Williams	Labour
Grantham	Sir Arthur Priestley	Liberal
Gravesend	Gilbert Parker	Conservative
Great Grimsby	Sir George Doughty	Liberal Unionist
Great Yarmouth	Arthur Fell	Conservative
Greenock	Sir Godfrey Collins	Liberal
Greenwich	Ion Hamilton Benn	Conservative
Guildford	Edgar Horne	Conservative
Hackney Central	Sir Albert Spicer	Liberal
Hackney North	Raymond Greene	Conservative
Hackney South	Horatio Bottomley	Liberal
Haddingtonshire	Richard Haldane	Liberal
Haggerston	Henry Chancellor	Liberal
Halifax	J. H. Whitley	Liberal
Halifax	James Parker	Labour
Hallamshire	John Wadsworth	Labour
Hammersmith	William Bull	Conservative
Hampstead	Fletcher, John	Conservative
Handsworth	Ernest Meysey-Thompson	Liberal Unionist
Hanley	Enoch Edwards	Labour
Harborough	Paddy Logan	Liberal
Harrow	Harry Mallaby-Deeley	Conservative
Hartlepools, The	Stephen Furness	Liberal
Harwich	Harry Newton	Conservative
Hastings	Arthur du Cros	Conservative
Hawick District of Burghs	Sir John Barran, Bt	Liberal
Henley	Valentine Fleming	Conservative
Hereford	John Arkwright	Conservative
Hertford	John Rolleston	Conservative
Hexham	Richard Durning Holt	Liberal
Heywood	Harold Cawley	Liberal
High Peak	Samuel Hill-Wood	Conservative
Hitchin	Alfred Hillier	Conservative
Holborn	James Remnant	Conservative
Holderness	Stanley Wilson	Conservative
Holmfirth	Henry Wilson	Liberal
Honiton	Clive Morrison-Bell	Conservative
Horncastle	Lord Willoughby de Eresby	Conservative
Hornsey	Earl of Ronaldshay	Conservative
Horsham	The Earl Winterton	Conservative
Houghton-le-Spring	Robert Cameron	Liberal
Howdenshire	Henry Harrison-Broadley	Conservative
Hoxton	Christopher Addison	Liberal
Huddersfield	Arthur Sherwell	Liberal
Huntingdon	John Cator	Conservative
Hyde	Francis Neilson	Liberal
Hythe	Sir Edward Sassoon	Liberal Unionist
Ilkeston	J. E. B. Seely	Liberal
Ince	Stephen Walsh	Labour
Inverness District of Burghs	Annan Bryce	Liberal
Inverness-shire	Sir John Dewar	Liberal
Ipswich	Sir Daniel Ford Goddard	Liberal
Ipswich	Silvester Horne	Liberal
Isle of Thanet	Norman Craig	Conservative
Isle of Wight	Douglas Hall	Conservative
Islington East	Sir George Radford	Liberal
Islington North	George Touche	Conservative
Islington South	Thomas Wiles	Liberal
Islington West	Thomas Lough	Liberal
Jarrow	Godfrey Palmer	Liberal
Keighley	Sir John Brigg	Liberal
Kendal	Josceline Bagot	Conservative
Kennington	Sir Stephen Collins	Liberal
Kensington North	Alan Burgoyne	Conservative
Kensington South	Lord Claud Hamilton	Conservative
Kerry East	Timothy O'Sullivan	Irish Parliamentary Party
Kerry North	Michael Joseph Flavin	Irish Parliamentary Party
Kerry South	John Boland	Irish Parliamentary Party
Kerry West	Thomas O'Donnell	Irish Parliamentary Party
Kidderminster	Eric Knight	Conservative
Kildare North	John O'Connor	Irish Parliamentary Party
Kildare South	Denis Kilbride	Irish Parliamentary Party
Kilkenny City	Pat O'Brien	Irish Parliamentary Party
County Kilkenny North	Michael Meagher	Irish Parliamentary Party
County Kilkenny South	Matthew Keating	Irish Parliamentary Party
Kilmarnock Burghs	Adam Rolland Rainy	Liberal
Kincardineshire	Hon. Arthur Murray	Liberal
King's Lynn	Holcombe Ingleby	Conservative
Kingston upon Hull Central	Sir Seymour King	Conservative
Kingston upon Hull East	Thomas Ferens	Liberal
Kingston upon Hull West	Guy Wilson	Liberal
Kingston-upon-Thames	Sir George Cave	Conservative
Kingswinford	Henry Staveley-Hill	Conservative
Kirkcaldy District of Burghs	James Dalziel	Liberal
Kirkcudbrightshire	Gilbert McMicking	Liberal
Knutsford	Alan Sykes	Conservative
Lambeth North	William Gastrell	Conservative
Lanarkshire Mid	J. Howard Whitehouse	Liberal
Lanarkshire North East	Thomas Fleming Wilson	Liberal
Lanarkshire North West	William Pringle	Liberal
Lanarkshire South	Sir Walter Menzies	Liberal
Lancaster	Sir Norval Helme	Liberal
Launceston	Sir George Marks	Liberal
Leeds Central	Robert Armitage	Liberal
Leeds East	James O'Grady	Labour
Leeds North	Sir Rowland Barran	Liberal
Leeds South	William Middlebrook	Liberal
Leeds West	Edmund Harvey	Liberal
Leek	Sir Robert Pearce	Liberal
Leicester	Ramsay MacDonald	Labour
Leicester	Eliot Crawshay-Williams	Liberal
Leigh	Peter Raffan	Liberal
Leith District of Burghs	Ronald Munro-Ferguson	Liberal
Leitrim North	Francis Meehan	Irish Parliamentary Party
Leitrim South	Thomas Smyth	Irish Parliamentary Party
Leix	Patrick Meehan	Irish Parliamentary Party
Leominster	Sir James Rankin, Bt	Conservative
Lewes	William Campion	Conservative
Lewisham	Edward Coates	Conservative
Lichfield	Sir Courtenay Warner, Bt	Liberal
Limehouse	Sir William Pearce	Liberal
Limerick City	Michael Joyce	Irish Parliamentary Party
County Limerick East	Thomas Lundon	Irish Parliamentary Party
County Limerick West	Patrick O'Shaughnessy	Irish Parliamentary Party
Lincoln	Charles Roberts	Liberal
Linlithgowshire	Alexander Ure	Liberal
Liverpool Abercromby	Richard Chaloner	Conservative
Liverpool Everton	John Harmood-Banner	Conservative
Liverpool Exchange	Sir Leslie Scott	Conservative
Liverpool Kirkdale	Gerald Kyffin-Taylor	Conservative
Liverpool Scotland	T. P. O'Connor	Irish Parliamentary Party
Liverpool East Toxteth	Edward Marshall-Hall	Conservative
Liverpool West Toxteth	Robert Houston	Conservative
Liverpool Walton	F. E. Smith	Conservative
Liverpool West Derby	William Rutherford	Conservative
City of London	Rt Hon. Arthur Balfour	Conservative
City of London	Sir Frederick Banbury	Conservative
London University	Sir Philip Magnus	Liberal Unionist
Londonderry	Marquess of Hamilton	Irish Unionist
Londonderry North	Hugh T. Barrie	Irish Unionist
Londonderry South	John Gordon	Liberal Unionist
Longford North	J. P. Farrell	Irish Parliamentary Party
Longford South	John Phillips	Irish Parliamentary Party
North Lonsdale	George Haddock	Conservative
Loughborough	Maurice Levy	Liberal
Louth (Lincolnshire)	Timothy Davies	Liberal
Louth North	Richard Hazleton	Irish Parliamentary Party
Louth South	Joseph Nolan	Irish Parliamentary Party
Lowestoft	Edward Beauchamp	Liberal
Ludlow	Rowland Hunt	Liberal Unionist
Luton	Thomas Ashton	Liberal
Macclesfield	William Brocklehurst	Liberal
Maidstone	Viscount Castlereagh	Conservative
Maldon	Sir James Fortescue Flannery, Bt	Conservative
Manchester East	John Edward Sutton	Labour
Manchester North	Sir Charles Schwann, Bt	Liberal
Manchester North East	J. R. Clynes	Labour
Manchester North West	Sir George Kemp	Liberal
Manchester South	Arthur Haworth	Liberal
Manchester South West	Christopher Needham	Liberal
Mansfield	Arthur Markham	Liberal
Marylebone East	James Boyton	Conservative
Marylebone West	Sir Samuel Scott, Bt	Conservative
Mayo East	John Dillon	Irish Parliamentary Party
Mayo North	Daniel Boyle	Irish Parliamentary Party
Mayo South	John Fitzgibbon	Irish Parliamentary Party
Mayo West	William Doris	Irish Parliamentary Party
Meath North	Patrick White	Irish Parliamentary Party
Meath South	David Sheehy	Irish Parliamentary Party
Medway	Charles Warde	Conservative
Melton	Charles Yate	Conservative
Merionethshire	Sir Henry Jones	Liberal
Merthyr Tydfil	Sir Edgar Jones	Liberal
Merthyr Tydfil	Keir Hardie	Labour
Middlesbrough	Penry Williams	Liberal
Middleton	Sir Ryland Adkins	Liberal
Midlothian	The Master of Elibank	Liberal
Mile End	Hon. Harry Levy-Lawson	Liberal Unionist
Monaghan North	James Lardner	Irish Parliamentary Party
Monaghan South	John McKean	Independent Nationalist
Monmouth Boroughs	Lewis Haslam	Liberal
Monmouthshire North	Rt Hon. Reginald McKenna	Liberal
Monmouthshire South	Sir Ivor Herbert	Liberal
Monmouthshire West	Thomas Richards	Labour
Montgomery District	Edward Pryce-Jones	Conservative
Montgomeryshire	David Davies	Liberal
Montrose District of Burghs	Robert Harcourt	Liberal
Morley	Gerald France	Liberal
Morpeth	Thomas Burt	Liberal
New Forest	Walter Perkins	Conservative
Newark	John Starkey	Conservative
Newbury	William Mount	Conservative
Newcastle-upon-Tyne	Walter Hudson	Labour
Newcastle-upon-Tyne	Edward Shortt	Liberal
Newcastle-under-Lyme	Josiah Wedgwood	Liberal
Newington West	Cecil Norton	Liberal
Newmarket	Sir Charles Rose	Liberal
Newport	Beville Stanier	Conservative
Newry	John Mooney	Irish Parliamentary Party
Newton	Viscount Wolmer	Conservative
Norfolk East	Sir Robert Price	Liberal
Norfolk Mid	William Lewis Boyle	Conservative
Norfolk North	Noel Buxton	Liberal
Norfolk North West	Sir George White	Liberal
Norfolk South	Arthur Soames	Liberal
Norfolk South West	Richard Winfrey	Liberal
Normanton	Frederick Hall	Labour
Northampton	Hastings Lees-Smith	Liberal
Northampton	Charles McCurdy	Liberal
Northamptonshire East	Sir Leo Chiozza Money	Liberal
Northamptonshire Mid	Harry Manfield	Liberal
Northamptonshire North	Henry Brassey	Conservative
Northamptonshire South	Hon. Edward FitzRoy	Conservative
Northwich	Brunner, John	Liberal
Norwich	George Roberts	Labour
Norwich	Sir Frederick Low	Liberal
Norwood	Sir Harry Samuel	Conservative
Nottingham East	James Morrison	Conservative
Nottingham South	Lord Henry Cavendish-Bentinck	Conservative
Nottingham West	Sir James Yoxall	Liberal
Nuneaton	William Johnson	Labour
Oldham	Alfred Emmott	Liberal
Oldham	William Barton	Liberal
Orkney and Shetland	Cathcart Wason	Liberal
Ormskirk	Hon. Arthur Stanley	Conservative
Osgoldcross	Sir Joseph Compton-Rickett	Liberal
Ossory	William Delany	Irish Parliamentary Party
Oswestry	William Bridgeman	Conservative
Otley	Sir Hastings Duncan	Liberal
Oxford	Viscount Valentia	Conservative
Oxford University	Sir William Anson, Bt	Liberal Unionist
Oxford University	Lord Hugh Cecil	Conservative
Paddington North	Arthur Strauss	Conservative
Paddington South	Henry Percy Harris	Conservative
Paisley	Sir John McCallum	Liberal
Partick	Balfour, Robert	Liberal
Peckham	Sir Albion Richardson	Liberal
Peebles and Selkirk	Donald Maclean	Liberal
Pembroke and Haverfordwest District	Hon. Henry Guest	Liberal
Pembrokeshire	Walter Roch	Liberal
Penrith	James Lowther	Conservative (Speaker)
Penryn and Falmouth	Sydney Goldman	Conservative
Perth	Frederick Whyte	Liberal
Perthshire Eastern	William Young	Liberal
Perthshire Western	The Marquess of Tullibardine	Conservative
Peterborough	George Greenwood	Liberal
Petersfield	William Graham Nicholson	Liberal Unionist
Plymouth	Waldorf Astor	Conservative
Plymouth	Arthur Benn	Conservative
Pontefract	Handel Booth	Liberal
Poplar	Rt Hon. Sydney Buxton	Liberal
Portsmouth	Lord Charles Beresford	Conservative
Portsmouth	Sir Bertram Falle	Liberal Unionist
Preston	Hon. George Stanley	Conservative
Preston	Alfred Tobin	Conservative
Prestwich	Sir Frederick Cawley	Liberal
Pudsey	Frederick Ogden	Liberal
Radcliffe cum Farnworth	Theodore Taylor	Liberal
Radnorshire	Sir Francis Edwards	Liberal
Ramsey	Oliver Locker-Lampson	Conservative
Reading	Rufus Isaacs	Liberal
Reigate	Richard Hamilton Rawson	Conservative
Renfrewshire East	John Gilmour	Conservative
Renfrewshire West	James Greig	Liberal
Rhondda District	William Abraham	Labour
Richmond	Hon. William Orde-Powlett	Conservative
Ripon	Hon. Edward Wood	Conservative
Rochdale	Gordon Harvey	Liberal
Rochester	Sir Ernest Lamb	Liberal
Romford	John Bethell	Liberal
Roscommon North	James O'Kelly	Irish Parliamentary Party
Roscommon South	John Patrick Hayden	Irish Parliamentary Party
Ross	Percy Clive	Liberal Unionist
Ross and Cromarty	Galloway Weir	Liberal
Rossendale	Rt Hon. Lewis Harcourt	Liberal
Rotherham	Jack Pease	Liberal
Rotherhithe	Hubert Carr-Gomm	Liberal
Roxburghshire	John Jardine	Liberal
Rugby	John Baird	Conservative
Rushcliffe	Leif Jones	Liberal
Rutland	John Gretton	Conservative
Rye	George Courthope	Conservative
Saffron Walden	Cecil Beck	Liberal
St Albans	Hildred Carlile	Conservative
St Andrews District of Burghs	William Anstruther-Gray	Conservative
St Augustine's	Aretas Akers-Douglas	Conservative
St Austell	Hon. Thomas Agar-Robartes	Liberal
St George, Hanover Square	Hon. Alfred Lyttelton	Liberal Unionist
St George, Tower Hamlets	William Wedgwood Benn	Liberal
St Helens	Rigby Swift	Conservative
St Ives	Sir Clifford Cory, Bt	Liberal
St Pancras East	Joseph Martin	Liberal
St Pancras North	Willoughby Dickinson	Liberal
St Pancras South	Herbert Jessel	Liberal Unionist
St Pancras West	Felix Cassel	Conservative
Salford North	William Byles	Liberal
Salford South	Anderson Montague-Barlow	Conservative
Salford West	Sir George Agnew, Bt	Liberal
Salisbury	Godfrey Locker-Lampson	Conservative
Scarborough	Walter Rea	Liberal
Sevenoaks	Henry Forster	Conservative
Sheffield Attercliffe	Joseph Pointer	Labour
Sheffield, Brightside	Tudor Walters	Liberal
Sheffield, Central	James Hope	Conservative
Sheffield, Ecclesall	Samuel Roberts	Conservative
Sheffield, Hallam	Charles Stuart-Wortley	Conservative
Shipley	Percy Illingworth	Liberal
Shrewsbury	Sir Clement Lloyd Hill	Conservative
Skipton	William Clough	Liberal
Sleaford	Edmund Royds	Conservative
Sligo North	Thomas Scanlan	Irish Parliamentary Party
Sligo South	John O'Dowd	Irish Parliamentary Party
Somerset Eastern	Ernest Jardine	Liberal Unionist
Somerset Northern	Joseph King	Liberal
Somerset Southern	Sir Edward Strachey	Liberal
South Molton	George Lambert	Liberal
South Shields	Russell Rea	Liberal
Southampton	Sir Ivor Philipps	Liberal
Southampton	William Dudley Ward	Liberal
Southport	Godfrey White	Conservative
Southwark West	Edward Strauss	Liberal
Sowerby	John Sharp Higham	Liberal
Spalding	Francis McLaren	Liberal
Spen Valley	Sir Thomas Whittaker	Liberal
Stafford	Sir Walter Essex	Liberal
Staffordshire, North West	Albert Stanley	Labour
Staffordshire, West	George Lloyd	Liberal Unionist
Stalybridge	John Wood	Conservative
Stamford	Hon. Claud Heathcote-Drummond-Willoughby	Conservative
Stepney	William Glyn-Jones	Liberal
Stirling District of Burghs	Arthur Ponsonby	Liberal
Stirlingshire	Chapple, William	Liberal
Stockport	George Wardle	Labour
Stockport	Spencer Leigh Hughes	Liberal
Stockton-on-Tees	Jonathan Samuel	Liberal
Stoke-upon-Trent	John Ward	Liberal
Stowmarket	Frank Goldsmith	Conservative
Strand	Walter Long	Conservative
Stratford upon Avon	Philip Foster	Conservative
Stretford	Harry Nuttall	Liberal
Stroud	Charles Allen	Liberal
Sudbury	Cuthbert Quilter	Liberal Unionist
Sunderland	Hamar Greenwood	Liberal
Sunderland	Frank Goldstone	Labour
Sutherlandshire	Alpheus Morton	Liberal
Swansea District	Sir David Brynmor Jones	Liberal
Swansea Town	Sir Alfred Mond, Bt	Liberal
Tamworth	Francis Newdegate	Conservative
Taunton	Hon. William Peel	Conservative
Tavistock	Sir John Spear	Conservative
Tewkesbury	Hon. Michael Hicks Beach	Conservative
Thirsk and Malton	Viscount Helmsley	Conservative
Thornbury	Athelstan Rendall	Liberal
Tipperary East	Thomas Condon	Irish Parliamentary Party
Tipperary Mid	John Hackett	Irish Parliamentary Party
Tipperary North	John Esmonde	Irish Parliamentary Party
Tipperary South	John Cullinan	Irish Parliamentary Party
Tiverton	Hon. William Walrond	Conservative
Torquay	Charles Burn	Liberal Unionist
Totnes	Francis Mildmay	Liberal Unionist
Tottenham	Percy Alden	Liberal
Truro	George Hay Morgan	Liberal
Tullamore	Edmund Haviland-Burke	Irish Parliamentary Party
Tunbridge	Herbert Spender-Clay	Conservative
Tynemouth	Herbert Craig	Liberal
Tyneside	J. M. Robertson	Liberal
Tyrone East	William Redmond	Irish Parliamentary Party
Tyrone Mid	Richard McGhee	Irish Parliamentary Party
Tyrone North	Redmond Barry	Liberal
Tyrone South	Andrew Horner	Irish Unionist
Uxbridge	Hon. Charles Mills	Conservative
Wakefield	Sir Arthur Marshall	Liberal
Walsall	Richard Cooper	Conservative
Walthamstow	Sir John Simon	Liberal
Walworth	James Dawes	Liberal
Wandsworth	Sir Henry Kimber, Bt	Conservative
Wansbeck	Charles Fenwick	Liberal
Warrington	Sir Harold Smith	Conservative
Warwick and Leamington	Ernest Pollock	Conservative
Waterford City	John Redmond	Irish Parliamentary Party
Waterford East	Patrick Power	Irish Parliamentary Party
Waterford West	J. J. O'Shee	Irish Parliamentary Party
Watford	Arnold Ward	Conservative
Wednesbury	John Norton-Griffiths	Conservative
Wellington (Salop)	Charles Henry	Liberal
Wellington (Somerset)	Sir Alexander Fuller-Acland-Hood	Conservative
Wells	George Sandys	Conservative
West Bromwich	Viscount Lewisham	Conservative
West Ham North	Charles Masterman	Liberal
West Ham South	Will Thorne	Labour
Westbury	Sir John Fuller, Bt	Liberal
Westhoughton	William Wilson	Labour
Westmeath North	Laurence Ginnell	Independent Irish Nationalist
Westmeath South	Sir Walter Nugent, 4th Baronet	Irish Parliamentary Party
Westminster	William Burdett-Coutts	Conservative
Wexford North	Sir Thomas Esmonde, Bt	Irish Parliamentary Party
Wexford South	Peter Ffrench	Irish Parliamentary Party
Whitby	Gervase Beckett	Conservative
Whitechapel	Stuart Samuel	Liberal
Whitehaven	Thomas Richardson	Labour
Wick District of Burghs	Robert Munro	Liberal
Wicklow East	John Muldoon	Irish Parliamentary Party
Wicklow West	Edward Peter O'Kelly	Irish Parliamentary Party
Widnes	William Walker	Conservative
Wigan	Reginald Neville	Conservative
Wigtownshire	John Dalrymple	Conservative
Wilton	Sir Charles Bathurst	Conservative
Wimbledon	Henry Chaplin	Conservative
Winchester	Hon. Guy Baring	Conservative
Windsor	James Mason	Conservative
Wirral	Gershom Stewart	Conservative
Wisbech	Neil Primrose	Liberal
Wokingham	Ernest Gardner	Conservative
Wolverhampton East	George Thorne	Liberal
Wolverhampton South	T. E. Hickman	Conservative
Wolverhampton West	Alfred Bird	Conservative
Woodbridge	Robert Peel	Conservative
Woodstock	Alfred Hamersley	Conservative
Woolwich	Will Crooks	Labour
Worcester	Edward Goulding	Conservative
Worcestershire East	Austen Chamberlain	Liberal Unionist
Worcestershire North	John William Wilson	Liberal
Wycombe	Sir Charles Cripps	Conservative
York	Arnold Rowntree	Liberal
York	John Butcher	Conservative

== Floor Crossings ==
See the List of British politicians who have crossed the floor

1914 William Edwin Harvey (Derbyshire North East) resigned the Labour whip and joined the Liberals.

1914 William Johnson (Nuneaton) resigned the Labour whip and joined the Liberals.

1915 John George Hancock (Derbyshire Mid) resigned the Labour whip and joined the Liberals.

1915 John Wadsworth (Hallamshire) resigned the Labour whip and joined the Liberals.

1915 William Abraham (Rhondda) resigned the Labour whip and joined the Liberals.

== By-elections ==
- See List of United Kingdom by-elections (1900–1918)

== See also ==
- December 1910 United Kingdom general election
- List of parliaments of the United Kingdom
