= List of MPs elected in the January 1910 United Kingdom general election =

Jan–Dec 1910 Parliament of the United Kingdom
←	1906–1910 Parliament	Dec 1910–1918 Parliament	→
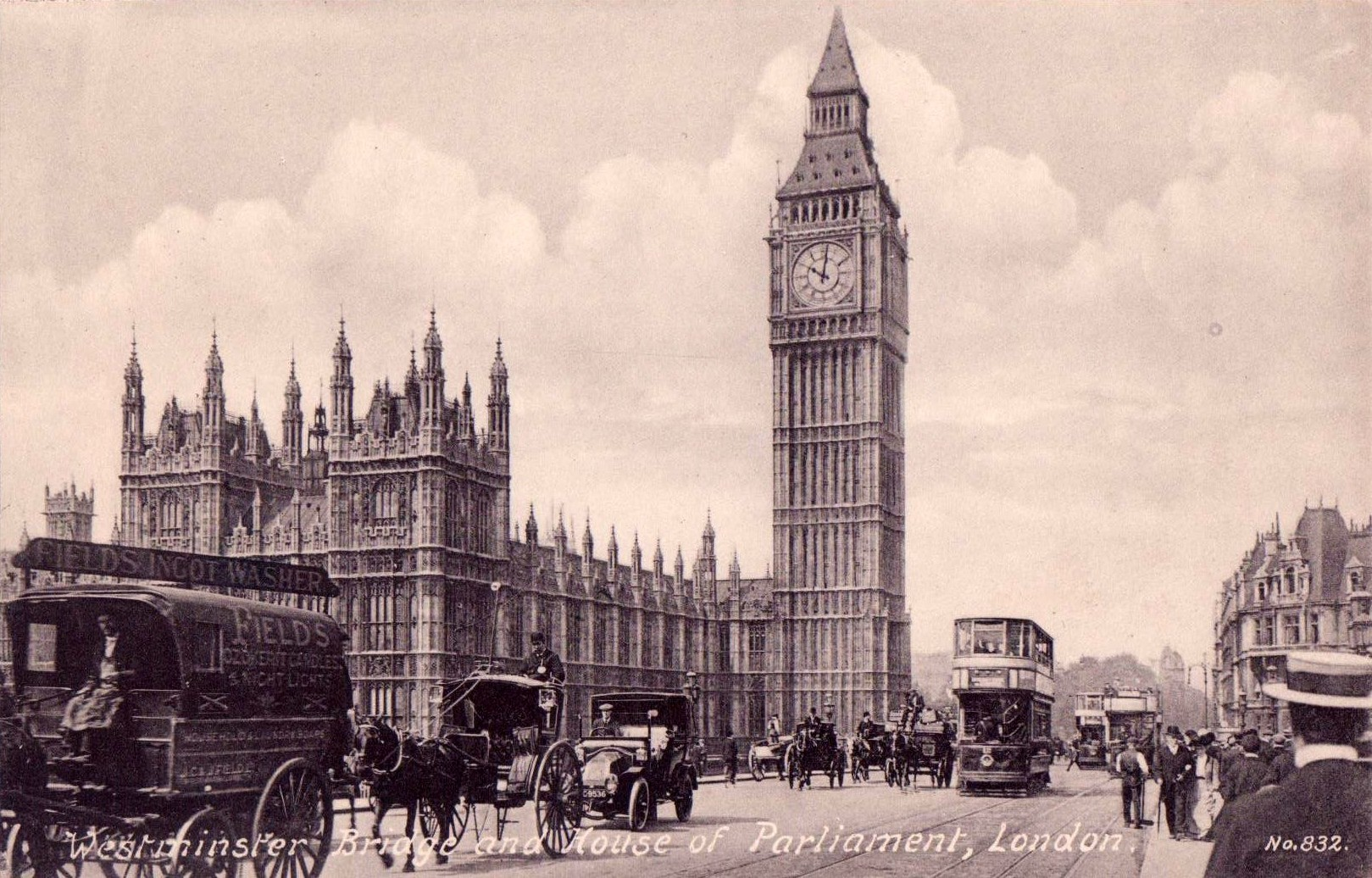
- The Palace of Westminster in 1910

Overview
- Legislative body: Parliament of the United Kingdom
- Meeting place: Palace of Westminster
- Term: 10 February 1910 – 3 December 1910
- Election: January 1910 United Kingdom general election
- Government: Second Asquith ministry

House of Commons
- Members: 670
- Speaker: James Lowther
- Leader: H. H. Asquith
- Prime Minister: H. H. Asquith
- Leader of the Opposition: Arthur Balfour
- Third-party leader: John Redmond

House of Lords
- Lord Chancellor: Robert Reid, 1st Earl Loreburn
- Leader: The Earl of Crewe

Crown-in-Parliament Edward VII → George V

Sessions
- 1st: 15 February 1910 – 28 November 1910

This is a list of members of Parliament (MPs) elected at the January 1910 general election, held over several days from 15 January to 10 February 1910.

== A ==
Constituency	MP	Party
Aberdeen North	Duncan Pirie	Liberal
Aberdeen South	George Esslemont	Liberal
Aberdeenshire East	Henry Cowan	Liberal
Aberdeenshire West	John Henderson	Liberal
Abingdon	Harold Henderson	Conservative
Accrington	Harold Baker	Liberal
Altrincham	Sir William Crossley	Liberal
Andover	Walter Faber	Conservative
Anglesey	Ellis Ellis-Griffith	Liberal
Antrim East	James McCalmont	Irish Unionist
Antrim Mid	Hon. Arthur O'Neill	Irish Unionist
Antrim North	Peter Kerr-Smiley	Irish Unionist
Antrim South	Charles Craig	Irish Unionist
Appleby	Lancelot Sanderson	Conservative
Arfon	William Jones	Liberal
Argyllshire	John Ainsworth	Liberal
Armagh Mid	John Lonsdale	Irish Unionist
Armagh North	William Moore	Irish Unionist
Armagh South	Charles O'Neill	Irish Parliamentary Party
Ashburton	Charles Buxton	Liberal
Ashford	Laurence Hardy	Conservative
Ashton-under-Lyne	Alfred Scott	Liberal
Aston Manor	Sir Evelyn Cecil	Conservative
Aylesbury	Lionel de Rothschild	Conservative
Ayr District of Burghs	Sir George Younger	Conservative
Ayrshire North	Andrew Anderson	Liberal
Ayrshire South	William Beale	Liberal
== B ==
Banbury	Robert Brassey	Conservative
Banffshire	Walter Waring	Liberal
Barkston Ash	George Lane-Fox	Conservative
Barnard Castle	Arthur Henderson	Labour
Barnsley	Joseph Walton	Liberal
Barnstaple	Ernest Soares	Liberal
Barrow-in-Furness	Charles Duncan	Labour
Basingstoke	Arthur Salter	Conservative
Bassetlaw	Sir William Hume-Williams	Conservative
Bath (Two members)	Lord Alexander Thynne	Conservative
Bath (Two members)	Sir Charles Hunter	Conservative
Battersea	John Burns	Liberal
Bedford	Walter Attenborough	Conservative
Belfast East	Gustav Wilhelm Wolff	Irish Unionist
Belfast North	Robert Thompson	Irish Unionist
Belfast South	James Chambers	Irish Unionist
Belfast West	Joseph Devlin	Irish Parliamentary Party
Bermondsey	Harold Glanville	Liberal
Berwick-upon-Tweed	Sir Edward Grey	Liberal
Berwickshire	Harold Tennant	Liberal
Bethnal Green North East	Edwin Cornwall	Liberal
Bethnal Green South West	Edward Pickersgill	Liberal
Bewdley	Stanley Baldwin	Conservative
Biggleswade	Arthur Black	Liberal
Birkenhead	Henry Vivian	Liberal
Birmingham Bordesley	Jesse Collings	Liberal Unionist
Birmingham Central	Sir Ebenezer Parkes	Liberal Unionist
Birmingham East	Arthur Steel-Maitland	Liberal Unionist
Birmingham Edgbaston	Francis Lowe	Conservative
Birmingham North	John Middlemore	Liberal Unionist
Birmingham South	Viscount Morpeth	Liberal Unionist
Birmingham West	Joseph Chamberlain	Liberal Unionist
Birr	Michael Reddy	Irish Parliamentary Party
Bishop Auckland	Sir Henry Havelock-Allan	Liberal
Blackburn (Two members)	Philip Snowden	Labour
Blackburn (Two members)	Sir Thomas Barclay	Liberal
Blackpool	Wilfrid Ashley	Conservative
Bodmin	Cecil Grenfell	Liberal
Bolton (Two members)	George Harwood	Liberal
Bolton (Two members)	Alfred Gill	Labour
Bootle	Thomas Sandys	Conservative
Boston	Charles Harvey Dixon	Conservative
Bosworth	Sir Charles McLaren	Liberal
Bow and Bromley	Alfred du Cros	Conservative
Bradford Central	Sir George Scott Robertson	Liberal
Bradford East	Sir William Priestley	Liberal
Bradford West	Fred Jowett	Labour
Brecknockshire	Sidney Robinson	Liberal
Brentford	Lord Alwyne Compton	Conservative
Bridgwater	Robert Sanders	Conservative
Brigg	Alfred Gelder	Liberal
Brighton (Two members)	George Tryon	Conservative
Brighton (Two members)	Hon. Walter Rice	Conservative
Bristol East	Charles Hobhouse	Liberal
Bristol North	Augustine Birrell	Liberal
Bristol South	Sir Howell Davies	Liberal
Bristol West	George Gibbs	Conservative
Brixton	Davison Dalziel	Conservative
Buckingham	Frederick Verney	Liberal
Buckrose	Sir Luke White	Liberal
Burnley	Gerald Arbuthnot	Conservative
Burton	Robert Ratcliff	Conservative
Bury	George Toulmin	Liberal
Bury St Edmunds	Hon. Walter Guinness	Conservative
Buteshire	Harry Hope	Conservative
== C ==
Caithness-shire	Leicester Harmsworth	Liberal
Camberwell North	Thomas Macnamara	Liberal
Camborne	Albert Dunn	Liberal
Cambridge	Almeric Paget	Conservative
Cambridge University (Two members)	Samuel Butcher	Conservative
Cambridge University (Two members)	John Rawlinson	Conservative
Canterbury	John Henniker Heaton	Conservative
Cardiff District	D. A. Thomas	Liberal
Cardiganshire	Matthew Vaughan-Davies	Liberal
Carlisle	Richard Denman	Liberal
County Carlow	Michael Molloy	Irish Parliamentary Party
Carmarthen District	W. Llewelyn Williams	Liberal
Carmarthenshire East	Abel Thomas	Liberal
Carmarthenshire West	John Lloyd Morgan	Liberal
Carnarvon	David Lloyd George	Liberal
Cavan East	Samuel Young	Irish Parliamentary Party
Cavan West	Vincent Kennedy	Irish Parliamentary Party
Chatham	Gerald Hohler	Conservative
Chelmsford	E. G. Pretyman	Conservative
Chelsea	Samuel Hoare	Conservative
Cheltenham	Viscount Duncannon	Conservative
Chertsey	Donald Macmaster	Conservative
Chester	Robert Yerburgh	Conservative
Chester-le-Street	John Wilkinson Taylor	Labour
Chesterfield	James Haslam	Labour
Chesterton	Hon. Edwin Montagu	Liberal
Chichester	Edmund Talbot	Conservative
Chippenham	George Terrell	Conservative
Chorley	Lord Balniel	Conservative
Christchurch	Henry Page Croft	Conservative
Cirencester	Hon. Benjamin Bathurst	Conservative
Clackmannan and Kinrossshire	Eugene Wason	Liberal
Clapham	Denison Faber	Conservative
Clare East	Willie Redmond	Irish Parliamentary Party
Clare West	Arthur Lynch	Irish Parliamentary Party
Cleveland	Herbert Samuel	Liberal
Clitheroe	David Shackleton	Labour
Cockermouth	Sir John Randles	Conservative
Colchester	Laming Worthington-Evans	Conservative
Colne Valley	Charles Leach	Liberal
Cork City (Two members)	William O'Brien	All-for-Ireland League
Cork City (Two members)	Augustine Roche	Irish Parliamentary Party
County Cork East	Anthony Donelan	Irish Parliamentary Party
County Cork Mid	D. D. Sheehan	All-for-Ireland League
County Cork North	Patrick Guiney	All-for-Ireland League
County Cork North East	William O'Brien	All-for-Ireland League
County Cork South	Edward Barry	Irish Parliamentary Party
County Cork South East	Eugene Crean	All-for-Ireland League
County Cork West	James Gilhooly	All-for-Ireland League
Coventry	Kenneth Foster	Conservative
Crewe	James Tomkinson	Liberal
Cricklade	Thomas Calley	Liberal Unionist
Croydon	Sir Robert Hermon-Hodge Bt.	Conservative
== D ==
Darlington	Ignaz Trebitsch-Lincoln	Liberal
Dartford	William Foot Mitchell	Conservative
Darwen	Frederick Hindle	Liberal
Denbigh District	Hon. William Ormsby-Gore	Conservative
Denbighshire East	Edward Hemmerde	Liberal
Denbighshire West	Sir John Roberts	Liberal
Deptford	C. W. Bowerman	Labour
Derby (Two members)	Sir Thomas Roe	Liberal
Derby (Two members)	J. H. Thomas	Labour
Derbyshire Mid	John Hancock	Labour
Derbyshire North East	W. E. Harvey	Labour
Derbyshire South	Herbert Raphael	Liberal
Derbyshire West	The Earl of Kerry	Liberal Unionist
Devizes	Basil Peto	Conservative
Devonport (Two members)	Sir John Jackson	Conservative
Devonport (Two members)	Clement Kinloch-Cooke	Conservative
Dewsbury	Walter Runciman	Liberal
Doncaster	Charles Nicholson	Liberal
Donegal East	Edward Kelly	Irish Parliamentary Party
Donegal North	Philip O'Doherty	Irish Parliamentary Party
Donegal South	J. G. Swift MacNeill	Irish Parliamentary Party
Donegal West	Hugh Law	Irish Parliamentary Party
Dorset East	Hon. Freddie Guest	Liberal
Dorset North	Sir Randolf Baker	Conservative
Dorset South	Angus Hambro	Conservative
Dorset West	Robert Williams	Conservative
Dover	George Wyndham	Conservative
Down East	James Craig	Irish Unionist
Down North	Thomas Lorimer Corbett	Irish Unionist
Down South	Jeremiah McVeagh	Irish Parliamentary Party
Down West	William MacCaw	Irish Unionist
Droitwich	John Lyttelton	Liberal Unionist
Dublin County North	J. J. Clancy	Irish Parliamentary Party
Dublin County South	Bryan Cooper	Irish Unionist
Dublin College Green	Joseph Nannetti	Irish Parliamentary Party
Dublin Harbour	Timothy Harrington	Irish Parliamentary Party
Dublin St Patrick's	William Field	Irish Parliamentary Party
Dublin St Stephen's Green	P. J. Brady	Irish Parliamentary Party
Dublin University (Two members)	Sir Edward Carson	Irish Unionist
Dublin University (Two members)	James Campbell	Irish Unionist
Dudley	Arthur George Hooper	Liberal
Dulwich	Bonar Law	Conservative
Dumbartonshire	J. D. White	Liberal
Dumfries District of Burghs	John Gulland	Liberal
Dumfriesshire	Percy Molteno	Liberal
Dundee (Two members)	Alexander Wilkie	Labour
Dundee (Two members)	Winston Churchill	Liberal
Durham	John Hills	Conservative
Durham Mid	John Wilson	Liberal
Durham North West	Llewellyn Atherley-Jones	Liberal
Durham South East	Evan Hayward	Liberal
== E ==
Ealing	Herbert Nield	Conservative
East Grinstead	Henry Cautley	Conservative
Eastbourne	Rupert Gwynne	Conservative
Eccles	George Pollard	Liberal
Eddisbury	Harry Barnston	Conservative
Edinburgh Central	Charles Edward Price	Liberal
Edinburgh East	Sir James Gibson	Liberal
Edinburgh South	Arthur Dewar	Liberal
Edinburgh West	James Avon Clyde	Liberal Unionist
Edinburgh and St Andrews Universities	Robert Finlay	Liberal Unionist
Egremont	James Augustus Grant	Conservative
Eifion	Ellis Davies	Liberal
Elgin District of Burghs	John Sutherland	Liberal
Elgin and Nairnshires	Sir Archibald Williamson	Liberal
Elland	Charles Trevelyan	Liberal
Enfield	John Pretyman Newman	Conservative
Epping	Amelius Lockwood	Conservative
Epsom	William Keswick	Conservative
Eskdale	Hon. Geoffrey Howard	Liberal
Essex South East	John Kirkwood	Conservative
Evesham	Bolton Eyres-Monsell	Conservative
Exeter	Henry Duke	Conservative
Eye	Hon. Harold Pearson	Liberal
== F ==
Falkirk District of Burghs	John Macdonald	Liberal
Fareham	Arthur Lee	Conservative
Faversham	Sir Granville Wheler	Conservative
Fermanagh North	Godfrey Fetherstonhaugh	Irish Unionist
Fermanagh South	Jeremiah Jordan	Irish Parliamentary Party
Fife East	H. H. Asquith	Liberal
Fife West	John Hope	Liberal
Finsbury Central	Martin Archer-Shee	Conservative
Finsbury East	Joseph Allen Baker	Liberal
Flint District	James Woolley Summers	Liberal
Flintshire	Herbert Lewis	Liberal
Forest of Dean	Sir Charles Dilke	Liberal
Forfarshire	James Falconer	Liberal
Frome	Sir John Barlow	Liberal
Fulham	Hayes Fisher	Conservative
== G ==
Gainsborough	George Jackson Bentham	Liberal
Galway Borough	Stephen Gwynn	Irish Parliamentary Party
Galway Connemara	William O'Malley	Irish Parliamentary Party
County Galway East	John Roche	Irish Parliamentary Party
County Galway North	Richard Hazleton	Irish Parliamentary Party
County Galway South	William Duffy	Irish Parliamentary Party
Gateshead	Harold Elverston	Liberal
Glamorganshire, East	Sir Alfred Thomas	Liberal
Glamorganshire, Mid	Sir Samuel Evans	Liberal
Glamorganshire, South	William Brace	Labour
Glasgow Blackfriars and Hutchesontown	George Barnes	Labour
Glasgow Bridgeton	James William Cleland	Liberal
Glasgow Camlachie	Halford Mackinder	Liberal Unionist
Glasgow Central	Charles Dickson	Conservative
Glasgow College	Harry Watt	Liberal
Glasgow St Rollox	McKinnon Wood	Liberal
Glasgow Tradeston	Archibald Corbett	Independent Liberal
Glasgow and Aberdeen Universities	Sir Henry Craik	Conservative
Gloucester	Henry Terrell	Conservative
Gorton	John Hodge	Labour
Govan	William Hunter	Liberal
Gower District	John Williams	Labour
Grantham	Arthur Priestley	Liberal
Gravesend	Sir Gilbert Parker	Conservative
Great Grimsby	Thomas Wing	Liberal
Great Yarmouth	Arthur Fell	Conservative
Greenock	Godfrey Collins	Liberal
Greenwich	Ion Hamilton Benn	Conservative
Guildford	Edgar Horne	Conservative
== H ==
Hackney Central	Sir Albert Spicer	Liberal
Hackney North	Raymond Greene	Conservative
Hackney South	Horatio Bottomley	Liberal
Haddingtonshire	Richard Haldane	Liberal
Haggerston	Henry Chancellor	Liberal
Halifax (Two members)	John Henry Whitley	Liberal
Halifax (Two members)	James Parker	Labour
Hallamshire	John Wadsworth	Labour
Hammersmith	William Bull	Conservative
Hampstead	John Fletcher	Conservative
Handsworth	Ernest Meysey-Thompson	Conservative
Hanley	Enoch Edwards	Labour
Harborough	R. C. Lehmann	Liberal
Harrow	Harry Mallaby-Deeley	Conservative
Hartlepools, The	Sir Christopher Furness	Liberal
Harwich	Harry Newton	Conservative
Hastings	Arthur du Cros	Conservative
Hawick District of Burghs	Sir John Barran	Liberal
Henley	Valentine Fleming	Conservative
Hereford	John Arkwright	Conservative
Hertford	John Rolleston	Conservative
Hexham	Richard Durning Holt	Liberal
Heywood	Harold Cawley	Liberal
High Peak	Oswald Partington	Liberal
Hitchin	Alfred Hillier	Conservative
Holborn	James Remnant	Conservative
Holderness	Stanley Wilson	Conservative
Holmfirth	Henry Wilson	Liberal
Honiton	Clive Morrison-Bell	Conservative
Horncastle	Lord Willoughby de Eresby	Conservative
Hornsey	The Earl of Ronaldshay	Conservative
Horsham	The Earl Winterton	Conservative
Houghton-le-Spring	Robert Cameron	Liberal
Howdenshire	Henry Harrison-Broadley	Conservative
Hoxton	Christopher Addison	Liberal
Huddersfield	Arthur Sherwell	Liberal
Huntingdon	John Cator	Conservative
Hyde	Francis Neilson	Liberal
Hythe	Sir Edward Sassoon	Conservative
== I ==
Ilkeston	Sir Balthazar Foster	Liberal
Ince	Stephen Walsh	Labour
Inverness District of Burghs	Annan Bryce	Liberal
Inverness-shire	Sir John Dewar	Liberal
Ipswich (Two members)	Daniel Ford Goddard	Liberal
Ipswich (Two members)	Silvester Horne	Liberal
Isle of Thanet	Norman Craig	Conservative
Isle of Wight	Douglas Hall	Conservative
Islington East	George Radford	Liberal
Islington North	David Waterlow	Liberal
Islington South	Thomas Wiles	Liberal
Islington West	Thomas Lough	Liberal
== J ==
Jarrow	Godfrey Palmer	Liberal
== K ==
Keighley	John Brigg	Liberal
Kendal	Josceline Bagot	Conservative
Kennington	Stephen Collins	Liberal
Kensington North	Alan Burgoyne	Conservative
Kensington South	Claud Hamilton	Conservative
Kerry East	Eugene O'Sullivan	Independent Nationalist
Kerry North	Michael Joseph Flavin	Irish Parliamentary Party
Kerry South	John Boland	Irish Parliamentary Party
Kerry West	Thomas O'Donnell	Irish Parliamentary Party
Kidderminster	Eric Knight	Conservative
Kildare North	John O'Connor	Irish Parliamentary Party
Kildare South	Denis Kilbride	Irish Parliamentary Party
Kilkenny City	Pat O'Brien	Irish Parliamentary Party
County Kilkenny North	Michael Meagher	Irish Parliamentary Party
County Kilkenny South	Matthew Keating	Irish Parliamentary Party
Kilmarnock	Adam Rolland Rainy	Liberal
Kincardineshire	Hon. Arthur Murray	Liberal
King's Lynn	Thomas Gibson Bowles	Liberal
Kingston upon Hull Central	Seymour King	Conservative
Kingston upon Hull East	Thomas Ferens	Liberal
Kingston upon Hull West	Guy Wilson	Liberal
Kingston-upon-Thames	George Cave	Conservative
Kingswinford	Henry Staveley-Hill	Conservative
Kirkcaldy District of Burghs	James Dalziel	Liberal
Kirkcudbrightshire	Sir Mark McTaggart-Stewart	Conservative
Knutsford	Alan Sykes	Conservative
== L ==
Lambeth North	William Gastrell	Conservative
Lanarkshire Mid	J. Howard Whitehouse	Liberal
Lanarkshire North East	Thomas Fleming Wilson	Liberal
Lanarkshire North West	William Pringle	Liberal
Lanarkshire South	Walter Menzies	Liberal
Lancaster	Sir Norval Helme	Liberal
Launceston	George Marks	Liberal
Leeds Central	Robert Armitage	Liberal
Leeds East	James O'Grady	Labour
Leeds North	Sir Rowland Barran	Liberal
Leeds South	William Middlebrook	Liberal
Leeds West	Edmund Harvey	Liberal
Leek	Arthur Heath	Conservative
Leicester (Two members)	Ramsay MacDonald	Labour
Leicester (Two members)	Eliot Crawshay-Williams	Liberal
Leigh	Peter Raffan	Liberal
Leith District of Burghs	Ronald Munro-Ferguson	Liberal
Leitrim North	Francis Meehan	Irish Parliamentary Party
Leitrim South	Thomas Smyth	Irish Parliamentary Party
Leix	Patrick Meehan	Irish Parliamentary Party
Leominster	Sir James Rankin	Conservative
Lewes	Sir Henry Aubrey-Fletcher	Conservative
Lewisham	Sir Edward Coates	Conservative
Lichfield	Courtenay Warner	Liberal
Limehouse	Sir William Pearce	Liberal
Limerick City	Michael Joyce	Irish Parliamentary Party
County Limerick East	Thomas Lundon	Irish Parliamentary Party
County Limerick West	Patrick O'Shaughnessy	Irish Parliamentary Party
Lincoln	Charles Roberts	Liberal
Linlithgowshire	Alexander Ure	Liberal
Liverpool Abercromby	Richard Chaloner	Conservative
Liverpool Everton	John Harmood-Banner	Conservative
Liverpool Exchange	Max Muspratt	Liberal
Liverpool Kirkdale	Charles McArthur	Liberal Unionist
Liverpool Scotland	T. P. O'Connor	Irish Parliamentary Party (Ireland)
Liverpool East Toxteth	Edward Marshall-Hall	Conservative
Liverpool West Toxteth	Robert Houston	Conservative
Liverpool Walton	F. E. Smith	Conservative
Liverpool West Derby	William Rutherford	Conservative
City of London (Two members)	Arthur Balfour	Conservative
City of London (Two members)	Sir Frederick Banbury	Conservative
London University	Sir Philip Magnus	Liberal Unionist
Londonderry	The Marquess of Hamilton	Irish Unionist
Londonderry North	Hugh T. Barrie	Irish Unionist
Londonderry South	John Gordon	Liberal Unionist
Longford North	J. P. Farrell	Irish Parliamentary Party
Longford South	John Phillips	Irish Parliamentary Party
North Lonsdale	George Haddock	Conservative
Loughborough	Maurice Levy	Liberal
Louth (Lincolnshire)	Langton Brackenbury	Conservative
Louth North	Tim Healy	All-for-Ireland League
Louth South	Joseph Nolan	Irish Parliamentary Party
Lowestoft	Harry Foster	Conservative
Ludlow	Rowland Hunt	Conservative
Luton	Thomas Ashton	Liberal
== M ==
Macclesfield	William Brocklehurst	Liberal
Maidstone	Viscount Castlereagh	Conservative
Maldon	Sir James Fortescue Flannery	Conservative
Manchester East	John Edward Sutton	Labour
Manchester North	Sir Charles Schwann	Liberal
Manchester North East	J. R. Clynes	Labour
Manchester North West	Sir George Kemp	Liberal
Manchester South	Arthur Haworth	Liberal
Manchester South West	Arthur Colefax	Conservative
Mansfield	Arthur Markham	Liberal
Marylebone East	James Boyton	Conservative
Marylebone West	Sir Samuel Scott	Conservative
Mayo East	John Dillon	Irish Parliamentary Party
Mayo North	Daniel Boyle	Irish Parliamentary Party
Mayo South	John O'Donnell	All-for-Ireland League
Mayo West	William Doris	Irish Parliamentary Party
Meath North	Patrick White	Irish Parliamentary Party
Meath South	David Sheehy	Irish Parliamentary Party
Medway	Charles Warde	Conservative
Melton	Henry de Rosenbach Walker	Liberal
Merionethshire	Henry Haydn Jones	Liberal
Merthyr Tydfil (Two members)	Keir Hardie	Labour
Merthyr Tydfil (Two members)	Edgar Jones	Liberal
Middlesbrough	Penry Williams	Liberal
Middleton	Ryland Adkins	Liberal
Midlothian	The Master of Elibank	Liberal
Mile End	Hon. Harry Lawson	Liberal Unionist
Monaghan North	James Lardner	Irish Parliamentary Party
Monaghan South	John McKean	Independent Nationalist
Monmouth Boroughs	Lewis Haslam	Liberal
Monmouthshire North	Reginald McKenna	Liberal
Monmouthshire South	Sir Ivor Herbert	Liberal
Monmouthshire West	Thomas Richards	Labour
Montgomery District	John Rees	Liberal
Montgomeryshire	David Davies	Liberal
Montrose District of Burghs	Robert Harcourt	Liberal
Morley	Gerald France	Liberal
Morpeth	Thomas Burt	Liberal
== N ==
New Forest	Walter Perkins	Conservative
Newark	John Starkey	Conservative
Newbury	William Mount	Conservative
Newcastle-upon-Tyne (Two members)	Walter Hudson	Labour
Newcastle-upon-Tyne (Two members)	Edward Shortt	Liberal
Newcastle-under-Lyme	Josiah Wedgwood	Liberal
Newington West	Cecil Norton	Liberal
Newmarket	George Henry Verrall	Conservative
Newport	Beville Stanier	Conservative
Newry	John Mooney	Irish Parliamentary Party
Newton	James Seddon	Labour
Norfolk East	Robert Price	Liberal
Norfolk Mid	William Boyle	Conservative
Norfolk North	Noel Buxton	Liberal
Norfolk North West	George White	Liberal
Norfolk South	Arthur Soames	Liberal
Norfolk South West	Richard Winfrey	Liberal
Normanton	Frederick Hall	Labour
Northampton (Two members)	Hastings Lees-Smith	Liberal
Northampton (Two members)	Charles McCurdy	Liberal
Northamptonshire East	Sir Francis Channing	Liberal
Northamptonshire Mid	Harry Manfield	Liberal
Northamptonshire North	Henry Brassey	Conservative
Northamptonshire South	Hon. Edward FitzRoy	Conservative
Northwich	John Brunner	Liberal
Norwich (Two members)	Sir Frederick Low	Liberal
Norwich (Two members)	George Roberts	Labour
Norwood	Sir Harry Samuel	Conservative
Nottingham East	James Morrison	Conservative
Nottingham South	Lord Henry Cavendish-Bentinck	Conservative
Nottingham West	James Yoxall	Liberal
Nuneaton	William Johnson	Labour
== O ==
Oldham (Two members)	Alfred Emmott	Liberal
Oldham (Two members)	William Barton	Liberal
Orkney and Shetland	Cathcart Wason	Liberal
Ormskirk	Hon. Arthur Stanley	Conservative
Osgoldcross	Joseph Compton-Rickett	Liberal
Ossory	William Delany	Irish Parliamentary Party
Oswestry	William Bridgeman	Conservative
Otley	Hastings Duncan	Liberal
Oxford	The Viscount Valentia	Conservative
Oxford University (Two members)	Lord Hugh Cecil	Conservative
Oxford University (Two members)	Sir William Anson	Liberal Unionist
== P ==
Paddington North	Arthur Strauss	Conservative
Paddington South	Henry Percy Harris	Conservative
Paisley	John McCallum	Liberal
Partick	Robert Balfour	Liberal
Peckham	Henry Gooch	Conservative
Peebles and Selkirk	William Younger	Liberal
Pembroke and Haverfordwest District	Owen Philipps	Liberal
Pembrokeshire	Walter Roch	Liberal
Penrith	James Lowther	Conservative
Penryn and Falmouth	Sydney Goldman	Conservative
Perth	Frederick Whyte	Liberal
Perthshire Eastern	William Young	Liberal
Perthshire Western	The Marquess of Tullibardine	Conservative
Peterborough	Sir George Greenwood	Liberal
Petersfield	William Graham Nicholson	Conservative
Plymouth (Two members)	Aneurin Williams	Liberal
Plymouth (Two members)	Charles Mallet	Liberal
Pontefract	Thomas Nussey	Liberal
Poplar	Sydney Buxton	Liberal
Portsmouth (Two members)	Lord Charles Beresford	Conservative
Portsmouth (Two members)	Bertram Falle	Liberal Unionist
Preston (Two members)	Hon. George Stanley	Conservative
Preston (Two members)	Alfred Tobin	Conservative
Prestwich	Sir Frederick Cawley	Liberal
Pudsey	Frederick Ogden	Liberal
== R ==
Radcliffe cum Farnworth	Theodore Taylor	Liberal
Radnorshire	Charles Dillwyn-Venables-Llewellyn	Conservative
Ramsey	Oliver Locker-Lampson	Conservative
Reading	Rufus Isaacs	Liberal
Reigate	Richard Hamilton Rawson	Conservative
Renfrewshire East	John Gilmour	Conservative
Renfrewshire West	James Greig	Liberal
Rhondda District	William Abraham	Labour
Richmond	Hon. William Orde-Powlett	Conservative
Ripon	Hon. Edward Wood	Conservative
Rochdale	Gordon Harvey	Liberal
Rochester	Samuel Ridley	Conservative
Romford	Sir John Bethell	Liberal
Roscommon North	James O'Kelly	Irish Parliamentary Party
Roscommon South	John Patrick Hayden	Irish Parliamentary Party
Ross	Percy Clive	Conservative
Ross and Cromarty	Galloway Weir	Liberal
Rossendale	Lewis Harcourt	Liberal
Rotherham	Sir William Holland	Liberal
Rotherhithe	Hubert Carr-Gomm	Liberal
Roxburghshire	John Jardine	Liberal
Rugby	John Baird	Conservative
Rushcliffe	John Ellis	Liberal
Rutland	John Gretton, 1st Baron Gretton	Conservative
Rye	George Courthope	Conservative
== S ==
Saffron Walden	Douglas Proby	Conservative
St Albans	Hildred Carlile	Conservative
St Andrews District of Burghs	James Duncan Millar	Liberal
St Augustine's	Aretas Akers-Douglas	Conservative
St Austell	Hon. Thomas Agar-Robartes	Liberal
St George, Hanover Square	Hon. Alfred Lyttelton	Liberal Unionist
St George, Tower Hamlets	William Wedgwood Benn	Liberal
St Helens	Thomas Glover	Labour
St Ives	Sir Clifford Cory, Bt	Liberal
St Pancras East	Joseph Martin	Liberal
St Pancras North	Willoughby Dickinson	Liberal
St Pancras South	Herbert Jessel	Liberal Unionist
St Pancras West	Sir William Collins	Liberal
Salford North	William Byles	Liberal
Salford South	Hilaire Belloc	Liberal
Salford West	George Agnew	Liberal
Salisbury	Godfrey Locker-Lampson	Conservative
Scarborough	Walter Rea	Liberal
Sevenoaks	Henry Forster	Conservative
Sheffield Attercliffe	Joseph Pointer	Labour
Sheffield, Brightside	Tudor Walters	Liberal
Sheffield, Central	James Hope	Conservative
Sheffield, Ecclesall	Samuel Roberts	Conservative
Sheffield, Hallam	Charles Stuart-Wortley	Conservative
Shipley	Percy Illingworth	Liberal
Shrewsbury	Sir Clement Lloyd Hill	Conservative
Skipton	William Clough	Liberal
Sleaford	Edmund Royds	Conservative
Sligo North	Thomas Scanlan	Irish Parliamentary Party
Sligo South	John O'Dowd	Irish Parliamentary Party
Somerset Eastern	Ernest Jardine	Liberal Unionist
Somerset Northern	Joseph King	Liberal
Somerset Southern	Sir Edward Strachey	Liberal
South Molton	George Lambert	Liberal
South Shields	Sir William Robson	Liberal
Southampton (Two members)	Ivor Philipps	Liberal
Southampton (Two members)	William Dudley Ward	Liberal
Southport	Godfrey Dalrymple-White	Conservative
Southwark West	William Dunn	Conservative
Sowerby	John Sharp Higham	Liberal
Spalding	Francis McLaren	Liberal
Spen Valley	Sir Thomas Whittaker	Liberal
Stafford	Sir Charles Shaw	Liberal
Staffordshire, North West	Albert Stanley	Labour
Staffordshire, West	George Lloyd	Liberal Unionist
Stalybridge	John Wood	Conservative
Stamford	Hon. Claude Heathcote-Drummond-Willoughby	Conservative
Stepney	Leverton Harris	Conservative
Stirling District of Burghs	Arthur Ponsonby	Liberal
Stirlingshire	William Chapple	Liberal
Stockport (Two members)	George Wardle	Labour
Stockport (Two members)	Spencer Leigh Hughes	Liberal
Stockton-on-Tees	Jonathan Samuel	Liberal
Stoke-upon-Trent	John Ward	Liberal
Stowmarket	Frank Goldsmith	Conservative
Strand	Walter Long	Conservative
Stratford upon Avon	Philip Foster	Conservative
Stretford	Harry Nuttall	Liberal
Stroud	Charles Allen	Liberal
Sudbury	Cuthbert Quilter	Conservative
Sunderland (Two members)	Samuel Storey	Independent Conservative
Sunderland (Two members)	James Knott	Conservative
Sutherlandshire	Alpheus Morton	Liberal
Swansea District	Sir David Brynmor Jones	Liberal
Swansea Town	Alfred Mond	Liberal
== T ==
Tamworth	Francis Newdegate	Conservative
Taunton	Hon. William Peel	Conservative
Tavistock	Hugh Luttrell	Liberal
Tewkesbury	Hon. Michael Hicks Beach	Conservative
Thirsk and Malton	Viscount Helmsley	Conservative
Thornbury	Athelstan Rendall	Liberal
Tipperary East	Thomas Condon	Irish Parliamentary Party
Tipperary Mid	John Hackett	Irish Parliamentary Party
Tipperary North	Michael Hogan	Irish Parliamentary Party
Tipperary South	John Cullinan	Irish Parliamentary Party
Tiverton	Hon. William Walrond	Conservative
Torquay	Sir Francis Layland-Barratt	Liberal
Totnes	Francis Mildmay	Liberal Unionist
Tottenham	Percy Alden	Liberal
Truro	George Hay Morgan	Liberal
Tullamore	Edmund Haviland-Burke	Irish Parliamentary Party
Tunbridge	Herbert Spender-Clay	Conservative
Tynemouth	Herbert Craig	Liberal
Tyneside	J. M. Robertson	Liberal
Tyrone East	Tom Kettle	Irish Parliamentary Party
Tyrone Mid	Gerald Brunskill	Irish Unionist
Tyrone North	Redmond Barry	Liberal
Tyrone South	Andrew Horner	Irish Unionist
== U ==
Uxbridge	Hon. Charles Mills	Conservative
== W ==
Wakefield	Edward Brotherton	Conservative
Walsall	Richard Cooper	Conservative
Walthamstow	John Simon	Liberal
Walworth	James Dawes	Liberal
Wandsworth	Sir Henry Kimber, Bt	Conservative
Wansbeck	Charles Fenwick	Liberal
Warrington	Arthur Crosfield	Liberal
Warwick and Leamington	Ernest Pollock	Conservative
Waterford City	John Redmond	Irish Parliamentary Party
Waterford East	Patrick Power	Irish Parliamentary Party
Waterford West	J. J. O'Shee	Irish Parliamentary Party
Watford	Arnold Ward	Conservative
Wednesbury	John Norton-Griffiths	Conservative
Wellington (Salop)	Charles Henry	Liberal
Wellington (Somerset)	Sir Alexander Fuller-Acland-Hood, Bt	Conservative
Wells	George Sandys	Conservative
West Bromwich	Viscount Lewisham	Conservative
West Ham North	Charles Masterman	Liberal
West Ham South	Will Thorne	Labour
Westbury	John Fuller	Liberal
Westhoughton	William Wilson	Labour
Westmeath North	Laurence Ginnell	Independent Irish Nationalist
Westmeath South	Sir Walter Nugent, Bt	Irish Parliamentary Party
Westminster	William Burdett-Coutts	Conservative
Wexford North	Sir Thomas Esmonde, Bt	Irish Parliamentary Party
Wexford South	Peter Ffrench	Irish Parliamentary Party
Whitby	Gervase Beckett	Conservative
Whitechapel	Stuart Samuel	Liberal
Whitehaven	John Arthur Jackson	Conservative
Wick District of Burghs	Robert Munro	Liberal
Wicklow East	John Muldoon	Irish Parliamentary Party
Wicklow West	James O'Connor	Irish Parliamentary Party
Widnes	William Walker	Conservative
Wigan	Henry Twist	Labour
Wigtownshire	Viscount Dalrymple	Conservative
Wilton	Charles Bathurst	Conservative
Wimbledon	Henry Chaplin	Conservative
Winchester	Hon. Guy Baring	Conservative
Windsor	James Mason	Conservative
Wirral	Gershom Stewart	Conservative
Wisbech	Neil Primrose	Liberal
Wokingham	Ernest Gardner	Conservative
Wolverhampton East	George Thorne	Liberal
Wolverhampton South	T. E. Hickman	Conservative
Wolverhampton West	Alfred Bird	Conservative
Woodbridge	Robert Francis Peel	Conservative
Woodstock	Alfred Hamersley	Conservative
Woolwich	William Augustus Adam	Conservative
Worcester	Edward Goulding	Conservative
Worcestershire East	Austen Chamberlain	Liberal Unionist
Worcestershire North	John William Wilson	Liberal
Wycombe	Sir Charles Cripps	Conservative
== Y ==
York (Two members)	Arnold Rowntree	Liberal
York (Two members)	John Butcher	Conservative

== By-elections ==
See the list of United Kingdom by-elections.

== See also ==
- January 1910 United Kingdom general election
- List of parliaments of the United Kingdom
