= List of MPs elected in the 1910 United Kingdom general election =

List of MPs elected in the 1910 United Kingdom general election may refer to the results of other of two elections that year:

- List of MPs elected in the January 1910 United Kingdom general election
- List of MPs elected in the December 1910 United Kingdom general election

== See also ==
- 1910 United Kingdom general election (disambiguation)
