= Luke Hayden =

Irish nationalist politician and MP

Luke Hayden around 1895

Luke Patrick Hayden (c. 1850 – 23 June 1897) was an Irish nationalist politician and MP in the House of Commons of the United Kingdom of Great Britain and Ireland and as a member of the Irish Parliamentary Party represented South Leitrim from 1885 to 1892 and South Roscommon from 1892 until his death in 1897.

He was the son of Luke Hayden, a blacksmith at Roscommon, and was educated locally. He was secretary of one of the first Home Rule County organizations, the branch started in Co. Roscommon at the beginning of the movement. In about 1877 he succeeded O'Conor Eccles as proprietor of the Roscommon Messenger. He was Chairman of the town commissioners of the borough of Roscommon from 1880 until his death. For a time, he was a justice of the peace, but was dismissed on account of his Nationalist opinions. He spent 7 months as a suspect in prison in Galway and Monaghan in 1881 and 1882.

He won the new seat of South Leitrim by a huge majority over the Conservative candidate in the 1885 general election and was then returned unopposed in the 1886 general election.

When the Irish Parliamentary Party split over Charles Stewart Parnell’s leadership in 1890, Hayden supported Parnell. He did not contest South Leitrim in the 1892 general election, but stood in his native seat of South Roscommon where he defeated the sitting Anti-Parnellite Andrew Commins by a comfortable margin, taking 63 per cent of the vote in a straight fight. He was one of only nine pro-Parnellites elected to Parliament in that election. In the 1895 general election the prominent anti-Parnellite John Dillon attempted to oust him from South Roscommon, by standing there as well as in his own seat of Mayo East. Dillon however made little dent in his majority, Hayden taking 58 per cent of the vote, again in a straight fight.

Luke Hayden was a popular local figure and his funeral cortège in the county town of Roscommon on 25 June 1897 was over a mile long. The following month, he was succeeded in his South Roscommon seat by his younger brother John Patrick Hayden, also a Parnellite, who was returned unopposed.

A monument was erected in his memory at the Market Square in Roscommon town in approximately 1900 and remains standing today.

== Footnotes ==
Parliament of the United Kingdom
New constituency	Member of Parliament for South Leitrim; 1885–1892	Succeeded by Jasper Tully
Preceded by Andrew Commins	Member of Parliament for South Roscommon; 1892–1897	Succeeded by John Patrick Hayden
