= Jasper Tully =

Irish politician (1859–1938)

Jasper Tully (1859 – 16 September 1938) was an Irish nationalist politician and member of parliament (MP) in the House of Commons of the United Kingdom of Great Britain and Ireland.

He was elected as the Irish National Federation (Anti-Parnellite) MP for the South Leitrim constituency at the 1892 general election, and was re-elected unopposed at the 1895 general election. He was elected as the Irish Parliamentary Party MP at the 1900 general election. He did not contest the 1906 general election, but he did stand unsuccessfully in the North Roscommon by-election of February 1917, when Sinn Féin scored its first parliamentary election victory over the Irish Party. At the declaration of poll on 5 February he said he was delighted that Sinn Féin had won.

Parliament of the United Kingdom
Preceded by Luke Hayden	Member of Parliament for South Leitrim; 1892 – 1906	Succeeded by Thomas Smyth
