= Pierce McCan =

Irish politician (1882–1919)

Teachta Dála
- In office December 1918 – 6 March 1919
- Constituency: Tipperary East

Personal details
- Born: 2 August 1882 County Wexford, Ireland
- Died: 6 March 1919 (aged 36) Gloucester Gaol, England
- Party: Sinn Féin
- Education: Clongowes Wood College; Downside School

Pierce McCan or McCann (2 August 1882 – 6 March 1919) was an Irish Sinn Féin politician.

== Career ==
McCan was born at Prospect Lodge, Ballyanne Desmesne, County Wexford, the son of Francis McCan, a land agent, and Jane Power. He was nephew of Patrick Joseph Power, MP for East Waterford from 1885 to 1913. He attended Rockwell College, Clongowes Wood College and Downside School. He resided at Ballyowen House, Dualla, Cashel, County Tipperary, was an "extensive farmer" and was a member of the Tipperary Hunt.

He was a founder member of Sinn Féin in 1905. He joined the Gaelic League in 1909 and was a member of the Irish Volunteers from 1914 onward.

After more than 2,000 German and Austrian prisoners were imprisoned at Richmond Barracks, Templemore following the first battles of World War I in 1914, he plotted to engineer a mass escape but was thwarted when the prisoners were removed to Leigh, Lancashire in 1915. He was interned in 1916 after the Easter Rising for several months in Richmond Barracks, Dublin, and Knutsford, England. In May 1918, he was arrested under the German Plot and detained in Gloucester Gaol.

McCan was president of the East Tipperary executive of Sinn Féin. While incarcerated, he elected as a Sinn Féin MP for the Tipperary East constituency at the 1918 general election.

In January 1919, Sinn Féin MPs refused to recognise the Parliament of the United Kingdom and instead assembled in the Mansion House, Dublin as a revolutionary parliament called Dáil Éireann. McCan never sat in Dáil Éireann, dying in prison in 1919 during the Spanish flu pandemic. On 9 March 1919, McCan was buried in Dualla, Cashel, County Tipperary.

=== Vacancy ===
No by-election was called to replace him in the UK constituency. After 1 April 1922, the Irish Free State (Agreement) Act 1922 prohibited any by-election, and the constituency was abolished when parliament was dissolved on 26 October 1922 for the general election on 15 November.

The First Dáil also considered how to fill the vacancy; a select committee in April recommended that the local Sinn Féin organisation which nominated him should nominate his replacement; a June proposal to postpone action, either for six months or until a Westminster by-election was held, was referred to another committee, which recommended that "in view of the circumstances which occasioned the vacancy, it was due to the memory of the late Pierce McCann that his place should not be filled at present".

== Tribute on death ==
On 10 April 1919, Cathal Brugha told the First Dáil: "Before I formally move the motion, as I have mentioned the name of Pierce McCan, I would ask the Members of the Dáil to stand up as a mark of our respect to the first man of our body to die for Ireland, and of our sympathy with his relatives. We are sure that their sorrow is lightened by the fact that his death was for the cause for which he would have lived, and that his memory will ever be cherished in the hearts of the comrades who knew him, and will be honoured by succeeding generations of his countrymen with that of the other martyrs of our holy cause." The McCan Barracks in Templemore, County Tipperary, is named after him.

== Family ==
In the general election of January 1933, McCan's brother, Joseph, a member of the National Farmers' and Ratepayers' Association, stood unsuccessfully for the National Centre Party in the Tipperary constituency.

== See also ==
British Army military intelligence file for Pierce McCann

- List of members of the Oireachtas imprisoned during the Irish revolutionary period

== Sources ==
- Allegiance, Robert Brennan, (1950)
- Memoirs of Senator Joseph Connolly: A Founder of Modern Ireland, J. Anthony Gaughan (ed), (1996)

Parliament of the United Kingdom
Preceded by Thomas Condon	Member of Parliament for Tipperary East; 1918–1919	Vacant until constituency abolished in 1922
Oireachtas
New constituency	Teachta Dála for Tipperary East; 1918–1919	Vacant until constituency abolished in 1921
