= John Patrick Hayden =

Irish politician

Member of Parliament for South Roscommon
- In office 15 July 1897 – 25 November 1918
- Preceded by: Luke Patrick Hayden (Parnellite)
- Succeeded by: Harry Boland (Sinn Féin)
- Majority: Elected unopposed

Personal details
- Born: 25 April 1863 County Roscommon
- Died: 3 July 1954 (aged 91)
- Party: Irish Parliamentary Party (from 1900); Parnellite Irish National League (to 1900)
- Spouse: Henrietta Hill (m. 1912)
- Relations: Luke Hayden (brother)
- Profession: Editor and proprietor, Westmeath Examiner

John Patrick Hayden (25 April 1863 – 3 July 1954) was an Irish nationalist politician. As a member of the Irish Parliamentary Party, he served in the House of Commons of the United Kingdom of Great Britain and Ireland from 1897 to 1918 as Member of Parliament (MP) for South Roscommon. He was also editor and proprietor of the Westmeath Examiner, published in Mullingar, County Westmeath, and a member of the Irish Board of Agriculture. He was imprisoned four times by the British administration under different Coercion Acts.

He was the seventh son of Luke and Mary Hayden of County Roscommon, and was educated at St Comans, Roscommon. In 1912 he married Henrietta Hill, daughter of Thomas Scott of Hannaville, Greenisland, County Antrim.

Hayden founded the Westmeath Examiner in 1882, when he was not yet 20. In his early days he also made valuable contributions to Irish literature. He was an active campaigner during the Land War and Plan of Campaign of the 1880s. Like his older brother Luke Hayden, MP for South Leitrim and later for South Roscommon, John Hayden supported Charles Stewart Parnell during the split in the Irish nationalist movement from 1890 over Parnell's leadership. As a result, the Westmeath Examiner was subjected to a clerically organized boycott, and only survived commercially through a pact between Unionists and Parnellites on the Mullingar Board of Guardians, dividing advertising between pro-Parnellite and Unionist papers and excluding the clericalist Westmeath Independent.

On Luke's unexpected death in 1897, John Hayden was adopted as the Parnellite candidate to succeed him at South Roscommon. He was returned unopposed at the ensuing by-election and remained unopposed in the same seat at each succeeding general election until 1918, when he was defeated by the prominent Sinn Féiner Harry Boland by 10,685 votes to 4,233. Fitzpatrick (2003, pp. 109–12) gives a vivid account of the turbulent election campaign at South Roscommon in 1918.

In spite of his role as a land campaigner, in the early 1900s Hayden was himself the target for hostile agitation headed by Laurence Ginnell, who saw him as symbolising the Irish Party's hypocritical tolerance of ‘grazing’, the operation of large tracts of land for cattle-rearing rather than as smaller holdings for poorer farmers.

Hayden was a close associate of the leader of the Irish Party, John Redmond. He was consulted by Redmond before he made his historic statement in the British House of Commons in August 1914 committing Irish Volunteer support for Britain and her Allies and in the First World War. He was also one of the committee of six who drafted the Irish Parliamentary Party manifesto for the 1918 general election.

After his Parliamentary defeat, Hayden continued to take an active part in the editorship of the Westmeath Examiner until a fortnight before his death. By the time Hayden died at the age of 91 in July 1954, he was thought to be the last survivor of the Irish Parliamentary Party which had dominated Irish politics up to 1918 (but see entry on Patrick Whitty).

== Sources ==
- Paul Bew, Conflict and Conciliation in Ireland 1890–1910: Parnellites and Radical Agrarians, Oxford, Clarendon Press, 1987
- Dod's Parliamentary Companion, 1912
- David Fitzpatrick, Harry Boland's Irish Revolution, Cork University Press, 2003
- Stephen Gwynn, John Redmond’s Last Years, London, Edward Arnold, 1919
- Irish Times, 5 July 1954
- F. S. L. Lyons, John Dillon: A Biography, London, Routledge & Kegan Paul, 1968
- Patrick Maume, The Long Gestation: Irish Nationalist Life 1891–1918, Dublin, Gill & MacMillan
- Brian M. Walker (ed.), Parliamentary Election Results in Ireland, 1801–1922, Dublin, Royal Irish Academy, 1978
- Who Was Who 1951-1960

Parliament of the United Kingdom
Preceded by Luke Hayden	Member of Parliament for South Roscommon; 1897–1918	Succeeded by Harry Boland
