= Thomas Condon (Irish nationalist politician) =

Irish politician (1850–1943)

Thomas Joseph Condon (1850 – 4 July 1943) was an Irish politician.

Born in Clonmel, Condon worked as a cattle dealer and was elected as a town commissioner and Poor Law Guardian. He was elected as an Irish Parliamentary Party member for East Tipperary in the 1885 general election, holding his seat in 1886. He was appointed as an alderman in 1887 and was then Mayor of Clonmel from 1889, serving for three years.

Condon held his seat at the 1892 general election, then in 1895, he decided to stand in North Roscommon, but was defeated. However, he was able also to contest his old seat, thus remaining in Parliament. He held this at the 1900 general election, in which year he was again elected as Mayor of Clonmel for a three-year stint, and was elected to the new Tipperary County Council.

Condon was re-elected at each election until 1918, when he lost to Pierce McCan in the Sinn Féin landslide.

In 1875, he married Alicia McGrath; they had two children. Condon died aged 93 on 4 July 1943 at St Michael's Hospice, Dún Laoghaire. His last address was 15 Clarinda Park, Dún Laoghaire.

Parliament of the United Kingdom
New constituency	Member of Parliament for East Tipperary; 1885 – 1918	Succeeded by Pierce McCan
