= Thomas Smyth (Irish nationalist politician) =

Irish nationalist politician (1875–1937)

Thomas Francis Smyth (1875–1937) was an Irish nationalist politician and Member of Parliament (MP) in the House of Commons of the United Kingdom of Great Britain and Ireland.

He was first elected unopposed as the Irish Parliamentary Party MP for the South Leitrim constituency at the 1906 general election, and was again re-elected at the January 1910 and December 1910 general elections.

Parliament of the United Kingdom
Preceded by Jasper Tully	Member of Parliament for South Leitrim; 1906 – 1918	Constituency abolished
