= South Roscommon =

Former parliamentary constituency in the United Kingdom

- Former county constituency for the House of Commons

1885–1922
- Seats: 1
- Created from: County Roscommon
- Replaced by: Mayo South–Roscommon South

South Roscommon was a UK Parliament constituency in Ireland, returning one Member of Parliament from 1885 to 1922.

Prior to the 1885 general election the area was part of the County Roscommon constituency. From 1922, on the establishment of the Irish Free State, it was not represented in the UK Parliament.

== Boundaries ==
This constituency comprised the southern part of County Roscommon. In 1918, the boundaries were redrawn to reflect transfers made under the 1898 Local Government Act between County Roscommon and County Galway, with the district electoral division of Rosmoylan being transferred into Roscommon, and part of the urban district of Ballinasloe being transferred into Galway.

1885–1918: The baronies of Athlone, Ballintober South, Ballymoe, Castlereagh and Moycarn, and that part of the barony of Roscommon contained within the parishes of Cloonfinlough and Kilbride and the townlands of Coggalkeenagh, Coggalmore, Coggalstack, Coggaltonroe and Coggalfortyacres in the parish of Lissonuffy.

1918–1922: The existing South Roscommon constituency (excluding the part contained within the administrative county of Galway), and that part of the existing North Galway constituency contained within the administrative county of Roscommon.

== Members of Parliament ==
Election	Member	Party
1885	Andrew Commins	Nationalist
1886	Andrew Commins	Nationalist
1890	Andrew Commins	Anti-Parnellite
1892	Luke Hayden	Parnellite
1895	Luke Hayden	Parnellite
1897 (by-election)	John Patrick Hayden	Parnellite
1900	John Patrick Hayden	Nationalist
1906	John Patrick Hayden	Nationalist
1910, Jan	John Patrick Hayden	Nationalist
Dec. 1910	John Patrick Hayden	Nationalist
1918	Harry Boland	Sinn Féin
1922	UK constituency abolished	

== Elections ==
=== Elections in the 1880s ===
1885 general election: South Roscommon
Party	Candidate	Votes	%	±%
Irish Parliamentary	Andrew Commins	6,033	94.7	
Irish Conservative	William John Talbot	338	5.3	
Majority		5,695	89.4	
Turnout		6,371	68.1	
Registered electors		9,351		
Irish Parliamentary win (new seat)				

1886 general election: South Roscommon
Party	Candidate	Votes	%	±%
Irish Parliamentary	Andrew Commins	Unopposed		
Registered electors		9,351		
Irish Parliamentary hold				

=== Elections in the 1890s ===
1892 general election: South Roscommon
Party	Candidate	Votes	%	±%
Irish National League	Luke Hayden	3,815	63.0	N/A
Irish National Federation	Andrew Commins	2,244	37.0	N/A
Majority		1,571	26.0	N/A
Turnout		6,059	64.3	N/A
Registered electors		9,417		
Irish National League gain from Irish Parliamentary		Swing	N/A	

1895 general election: South Roscommon
Party	Candidate	Votes	%	±%
Irish National League	Luke Hayden	3,398	58.2	−4.8
Irish National Federation	John Dillon	2,444	41.8	+4.8
Majority		954	16.4	−9.6
Turnout		5,842	62.1	−2.2
Registered electors		9,407		
Irish National League hold		Swing	−4.8	

Hayden dies, causing a by-election.

By-election, 1897: South Roscommon
Party	Candidate	Votes	%	±%
Irish National League	John Patrick Hayden	Unopposed		
Registered electors		9,472		
Irish National League hold				

=== Elections in the 1900s ===
1900 general election: South Roscommon
Party	Candidate	Votes	%	±%
Irish Parliamentary	John Patrick Hayden	Unopposed		
Registered electors		8,980		
Irish Parliamentary hold				

1906 general election: South Roscommon
Party	Candidate	Votes	%	±%
Irish Parliamentary	John Patrick Hayden	Unopposed		
Registered electors		8,811		
Irish Parliamentary hold				

=== Elections in the 1910s ===
January 1910 general election: South Roscommon
Party	Candidate	Votes	%	±%
Irish Parliamentary	John Patrick Hayden	Unopposed		
Registered electors		8,980		
Irish Parliamentary hold				

December 1910 general election: South Roscommon
Party	Candidate	Votes	%	±%
Irish Parliamentary	John Patrick Hayden	Unopposed		
Registered electors		8,980		
Irish Parliamentary hold				

1918 general election: South Roscommon
Party	Candidate	Votes	%	±%
Sinn Féin	Harry Boland	10,685	71.6	New
Irish Parliamentary	John Patrick Hayden	4,233	28.4	N/A
Majority		6,452	43.2	N/A
Turnout		14,918	67.5	N/A
Registered electors		22,093		
Sinn Féin gain from Irish Parliamentary		Swing	N/A	
