= East Tipperary =

Former UK Parliament constituency in Ireland

- Former county constituency for the House of Commons

1885–1922
- Seats: 1
- Created from: County Tipperary
- Replaced by: Waterford–Tipperary East

East Tipperary was a UK Parliament constituency in Ireland, returning one Member of Parliament from 1885 to 1922. Prior to the 1885 general election the area was part of County Tipperary constituency. From 1922, on the establishment of the Irish Free State, it was not represented in the UK Parliament.

== Boundaries ==
This constituency comprised the eastern part of County Tipperary. In 1918, the boundaries were extended to include those parts of the urban districts of Clonmel and Carrick-on-Suir that had been transferred to South Tipperary from County Waterford as a result of the Local Government (Ireland) Act 1898.

1885–1918: The baronies of Iffa and Offa East and Middlethird, and that part of the barony of Slievardagh not contained within the constituency of Mid Tipperary.

1918–1922: The existing constituency of East Tipperary, together with that part of the existing East Waterford constituency contained in the administrative county of Tipperary.

== Members of Parliament ==
| Election | Member | Party | Note |
|---|---|---|---|
| 1885, December 1 | Thomas Condon | Irish Parliamentary | Party split |
| 1890, December (Note: Date of a party change. The Irish Parliamentary Party had been created in 1882, on the initiative of Charles Stewart Parnell's Irish National League. Both the IPP and the INL split into Parnellite and Anti-Parnellite factions, in December 1890. The Parnellites remained members of the Irish National League after the split and the Anti-Parnellites organised the Irish National Federation in March 1891. The two organisations and the United Irish League merged in 1900, to re-create the Irish Parliamentary Party.) | Thomas Condon | Anti-Parnellite | Joined new organisation |
| 1891, March ^{1} | Thomas Condon | Irish National Federation | Re-elected as an IPP candidate |
| 1900, October 2 | Thomas Condon | Irish Parliamentary | |
| 1918, December 14 (Note: Date of polling day. The result was declared on 28 December 1918, to allow time for votes cast by members of the armed forces to be included in the count.) | Pierce McCan | Sinn Féin | Did not take his seat at Westminster |
| 1919, March 6 (Note: Death of McCan) | vacant | | |
| 1922, October 26 | UK constituency abolished | | |

== Elections ==
=== Elections in the 1880s ===
1885 general election: East Tipperary
| Party | Candidate | Votes | % | ±% |
|---|---|---|---|---|
| Irish Parliamentary | Thomas Condon | 4,064 | 95.5 | |
| Irish Conservative | Fitzgibbon Trant | 192 | 4.5 | |
| Majority | | 3,872 | 91.0 | |
| Turnout | | 4,256 | 61.7 | |
| Registered electors | | 6,899 | | |
| Irish Parliamentary win (new seat) | | | | |

1886 general election: East Tipperary
| Party | Candidate | Votes | % | ±% |
|---|---|---|---|---|
| Irish Parliamentary | Thomas Condon | Unopposed | | |
| Registered electors | | 6,899 | | |
| Irish Parliamentary hold | | | | |

=== Elections in the 1890s ===
1892 general election: East Tipperary
| Party | Candidate | Votes | % | ±% |
|---|---|---|---|---|
| Irish National Federation | Thomas Condon | 2,998 | 77.1 | N/A |
| Irish National League | Patrick Richard Dennehy | 891 | 22.9 | N/A |
| Majority | | 2,107 | 54.2 | N/A |
| Turnout | | 3,889 | 54.2 | N/A |
| Registered electors | | 7,180 | | |
| Irish National Federation gain from Irish Parliamentary | | Swing | N/A | |

1895 general election: East Tipperary
| Party | Candidate | Votes | % | ±% |
|---|---|---|---|---|
| Irish National Federation | Thomas Condon | Unopposed | | |
| Registered electors | | 6,521 | | |
| Irish National Federation hold | | | | |

=== Elections in the 1900s ===
1900 general election: East Tipperary
| Party | Candidate | Votes | % | ±% |
|---|---|---|---|---|
| Irish Parliamentary | Thomas Condon | Unopposed | | |
| Registered electors | | 6,366 | | |
| Irish Parliamentary hold | | | | |

1906 general election: East Tipperary
| Party | Candidate | Votes | % | ±% |
|---|---|---|---|---|
| Irish Parliamentary | Thomas Condon | Unopposed | | |
| Registered electors | | 5,279 | | |
| Irish Parliamentary hold | | | | |

=== Elections in the 1910s ===
January 1910 general election: East Tipperary
| Party | Candidate | Votes | % | ±% |
|---|---|---|---|---|
| Irish Parliamentary | Thomas Condon | Unopposed | | |
| Registered electors | | 5,610 | | |
| Irish Parliamentary hold | | | | |

December 1910 general election: East Tipperary
| Party | Candidate | Votes | % | ±% |
|---|---|---|---|---|
| Irish Parliamentary | Thomas Condon | Unopposed | | |
| Registered electors | | 5,610 | | |
| Irish Parliamentary hold | | | | |

1918 general election: East Tipperary
| Party | Candidate | Votes | % | ±% |
|---|---|---|---|---|
| Sinn Féin | Pierce McCan | 7,487 | 61.0 | New |
| Irish Parliamentary | Thomas Condon | 4,794 | 39.0 | N/A |
| Majority | | 2,693 | 22.0 | N/A |
| Turnout | | 12,281 | 75.7 | N/A |
| Registered electors | | 16,232 | | |
| Sinn Féin gain from Irish Parliamentary | | Swing | N/A | |
