= South Leitrim =

Former parliamentary constituency in the United Kingdom

- Former county constituency for the House of Commons

1885–1918
- Seats: 1
- Created from: County Leitrim
- Replaced by: County Leitrim

South Leitrim was a parliamentary constituency in Ireland. From 1885 to 1918 it returned one Member of Parliament (MP) to the House of Commons of the United Kingdom of Great Britain and Ireland.

Prior to the 1885 general election and after the dissolution of Parliament in 1918 the area was part of the County Leitrim constituency.

== Boundaries ==
This constituency comprised the southern part of County Leitrim.

1885–1918: The baronies of Carrigallen and Mohill, and that part of the barony of Leitrim not contained within the constituency of North Leitrim.

== Members of Parliament ==
Election	Member	Party
1885	Luke Hayden	Nationalist
1890	Luke Hayden	Parnellite Nationalist
1892	Jasper Tully	Anti-Parnellite Nationalist
1900	Jasper Tully	Nationalist
1906	Thomas Smyth	Nationalist
1918	Constituency abolished: see County Leitrim	

== Elections ==
=== Elections in the 1880s ===
General election 8 December 1885: Leitrim South
Party	Candidate	Votes	%	±%
Irish Parliamentary	Luke Hayden	4,525	90.2	
Irish Conservative	James Ormsby Lawder	489	9.8	
Majority		4,036	80.4	
Turnout		5,014	80.0	
Registered electors		6,270		
Irish Parliamentary win (new seat)				

General election 6 July 1886: Leitrim South
Party	Candidate	Votes	%	±%
Irish Parliamentary	Luke Hayden	Unopposed		
Registered electors		6,270		
Irish Parliamentary hold				

=== Elections in the 1890s ===
General election 15 July 1892: Leitrim South
Party	Candidate	Votes	%	±%
Irish National Federation	Jasper Tully	4,241	89.2	N/A
Irish Unionist	Robert O'Brien	516	10.8	New
Majority		3,725	78.4	N/A
Turnout		4,757	76.1	N/A
Registered electors		6,253		
Irish National Federation gain from Irish Parliamentary		Swing	N/A	

General election 16 July 1895: Leitrim South
Party	Candidate	Votes	%	±%
Irish National Federation	Jasper Tully	Unopposed		
Registered electors		7,136		
Irish National Federation hold				

=== Elections in the 1900s ===
General election 1 October 1900: Leitrim South
Party	Candidate	Votes	%	±%
Irish Parliamentary	Jasper Tully	Unopposed		
Registered electors		8,242		
Irish Parliamentary hold				

General election 16 January 1906: Leitrim South
Party	Candidate	Votes	%	±%
Irish Parliamentary	Thomas Smyth	Unopposed		
Registered electors		5,971		
Irish Parliamentary hold				

=== Elections in the 1910s ===
General election 19 January 1910: Leitrim South
Party	Candidate	Votes	%	±%
Irish Parliamentary	Thomas Smyth	Unopposed		
Registered electors		5,727		
Irish Parliamentary hold				

General election 6 December 1910: Leitrim South
Party	Candidate	Votes	%	±%
Irish Parliamentary	Thomas Smyth	Unopposed		
Registered electors		5,727		
Irish Parliamentary hold				
