= List of MPs elected in the 1900 United Kingdom general election =

1900–1906 Parliament of the United Kingdom
←	1896–1900 Parliament	1906–1910 Parliament	→
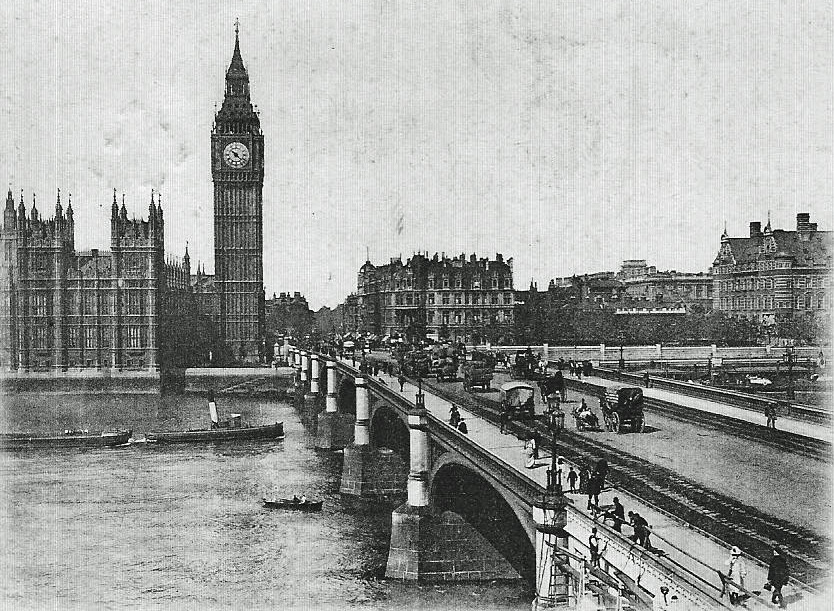
- The Palace of Westminster in 1900

Overview
- Legislative body: Parliament of the United Kingdom
- Jurisdiction: United Kingdom
- Meeting place: Palace of Westminster
- Term: 24 October 1900 – 8 February 1906
- Election: 1900 United Kingdom general election
- Government: Fourth Salisbury ministry (until 1902) Balfour ministry (1902–1905) Campbell-Bannerman ministry (from 1905)

House of Commons
- Members: 670
- Speaker: William Court Gully (until 1905); James Lowther (from 1905)
- Leader: Arthur Balfour (until 1905); Henry Campbell-Bannerman (from 1905)
- Prime Minister: Marquess of Salisbury (until 1902) Arthur Balfour (1902-1905) Henry Campbell-Bannerman (from 1905)
- Leader of the Opposition: Henry Campbell-Bannerman (until 1905); Arthur Balfour (from 1905)
- Third-party leader: John Redmond

House of Lords
- Lord Chancellor: Hardinge Giffard, 1st Earl of Halsbury (until 1905); Robert Reid, 1st Earl Loreburn (from 1905)
- Leader: Robert Gascoyne-Cecil, 3rd Marquess of Salisbury (until 1902) Spencer Cavendish, 8th Duke of Devonshire (1902–1903); Henry Petty-Fitzmaurice, 5th Marquess of Lansdowne (1903–1905) George Robinson, 1st Marquess of Ripon (from 1905)
- Leader of the Opposition: The Earl of Kimberley The Earl Spencer The Marquess of Ripon The Marquess of Lansdowne

Crown-in-Parliament Victoria → Edward VII

Sessions
- 1st: 3 December 1900 – 15 December 1900
- 2nd: 23 January 1901 – 17 August 1901
- 3rd: 16 January 1902 – 18 December 1902
- 4th: 17 February 1903 – 14 August 1903
- 5th: 2 February 1904 – 15 August 1904
- 6th: 14 February 1905 – 11 August 1905

This is a list of members of Parliament (MPs) elected at the 1900 general election, held over several days from 25 September to 24 October 1900. Keir Hardie and Richard Bell were elected as the first Labour MPs who were not affiliated with the Liberal Party (cf. Liberal-Labour).

Party	Seats
Conservative Party	318
Liberal Party	183
Irish Parliamentary Party	76
Liberal Unionist Party	68
Irish Unionist	16
Healyite Nationalist	6
Labour Representation Committee	2
Independent Liberal	1

== A ==
Constituency	MP	Party
Aberdeen North	Duncan Pirie	Liberal
Aberdeen South	James Bryce	Liberal
Aberdeenshire East	Archibald White Maconochie	Liberal Unionist
Aberdeenshire West	Robert Farquharson	Liberal
Abingdon	Archie Loyd	Conservative
Accrington	Joseph Leese	Liberal
Altrincham	Coningsby Disraeli	Conservative
Andover	William Wither Bramston Beach	Conservative
Anglesey	Ellis Ellis-Griffith	Liberal
Antrim East	James McCalmont	Irish Unionist
Antrim Mid	Robert Torrens O'Neill	Irish Unionist
Antrim North	William Moore	Irish Unionist
Antrim South	William Ellison-Macartney	Irish Unionist
Appleby	Richard Rigg	Liberal
Arfon	William Jones	Liberal
Argyllshire	Donald Nicol	Conservative
Armagh Mid	John Lonsdale	Irish Unionist
Armagh North	Edward James Saunderson	Irish Unionist
Armagh South	John Campbell	Healyite Nationalist
Ashburton	Charles Seale-Hayne	Liberal
Ashford	Laurence Hardy	Conservative
Ashton-under-Lyne	Herbert Whiteley	Conservative
Aston Manor	Evelyn Cecil	Conservative
Aylesbury	Hon. Walter Rothschild	Liberal Unionist
Ayr District of Burghs	Charles Lindsay Orr-Ewing	Conservative
Ayrshire North	Thomas Cochrane	Liberal Unionist
Ayrshire South	Sir William Arrol	Liberal Unionist
== B ==
Banbury	Albert Brassey	Conservative
Banffshire	Alexander William Black	Liberal
Barkston Ash	Robert Gunter	Conservative
Barnard Castle	Sir Joseph Pease, Bt	Liberal
Barnsley	Sir Joseph Walton, Bt	Liberal
Barnstaple	Ernest Soares	Liberal
Barrow-in-Furness	Sir Charles Cayzer	Conservative
Basingstoke	Arthur Frederick Jeffreys	Conservative
Bassetlaw	Sir Frederick Milner, Bt	Conservative
Bath (Two members)	Wyndham Murray	Conservative
Bath (Two members)	Edmond Wodehouse	Liberal Unionist
Battersea	John Burns	Liberal-Labour
Bedford	Charles Pym	Conservative
Belfast, East	Gustav Wilhelm Wolff	Irish Unionist
Belfast, North	James Horner Haslett	Irish Unionist
Belfast, South	William Johnston	Irish Unionist
Belfast, West	H. O. Arnold-Forster	Liberal Unionist
Bermondsey	Henry Cust	Conservative
Berwick-upon-Tweed	Sir Edward Grey, Bt	Liberal
Berwickshire	Harold Tennant	Liberal
Bethnal Green North East	Sir Mancherjee Bhownagree	Conservative
Bethnal Green South West	Samuel Forde Ridley	Conservative
Bewdley	Alfred Baldwin	Conservative
Biggleswade	Alwyne Compton	Liberal Unionist
Birkenhead	Sir Elliott Lees, Bt	Conservative
Birmingham Bordesley	Jesse Collings	Liberal Unionist
Birmingham Central	Ebenezer Parkes	Liberal Unionist
Birmingham East	Sir John Benjamin Stone	Conservative
Birmingham Edgbaston	Francis Lowe	Conservative
Birmingham North	John Middlemore	Liberal Unionist
Birmingham South	Joseph Powell-Williams	Liberal Unionist
Birmingham West	Joseph Chamberlain	Liberal Unionist
Birr	Michael Reddy	Irish Parliamentary Party
Bishop Auckland	James Mellor Paulton	Liberal
Blackburn (Two members)	Sir William Hornby, Bt	Conservative
Blackburn (Two members)	Sir William Coddington, Bt	Conservative
Blackpool	Henry Worsley-Taylor	Conservative
Bodmin	Sir Lewis Molesworth, Bt	Liberal Unionist
Bolton (Two members)	Herbert Shepherd-Cross	Conservative
Bolton (Two members)	George Harwood	Liberal
Bootle	Thomas Sandys	Conservative
Boston	William Garfit	Conservative
Bosworth	Charles McLaren	Liberal
Bow and Bromley	Walter Guthrie	Conservative
Bradford Central	James Wanklyn	Liberal Unionist
Bradford East	Ronald Greville	Conservative
Bradford West	Ernest Flower	Conservative
Brecknockshire	Charles Morley	Liberal
Brentford	James Bigwood	Conservative
Bridgwater	Edward Stanley	Conservative
Brigg	Harold Reckitt	Liberal
Brighton (Two members)	Gerald Loder	Conservative
Brighton (Two members)	Bruce Vernon-Wentworth	Conservative
Bristol East	Charles Hobhouse	Liberal
Bristol North	Sir Frederick Wills, Bt	Liberal Unionist
Bristol South	Walter Long	Conservative
Bristol West	Sir Michael Hicks Beach, Bt	Conservative
Brixton	Sir Robert Mowbray, Bt	Conservative
Buckingham	William Carlile	Conservative
Buckrose	Sir Luke White	Liberal
Burnley	William Mitchell	Conservative
Burton	Robert Ratcliff	Liberal Unionist
Bury	James Kenyon	Conservative
Bury St Edmunds	Sir Edward Greene, Bt	Conservative
Buteshire	Andrew Murray	Conservative
== C ==
Caithness-shire	Leicester Harmsworth	Liberal
Camberwell North	Thomas James Macnamara	Liberal
Camborne	William Sproston Caine	Liberal
Cambridge	Sir Robert Uniacke-Penrose-Fitzgerald, Bt	Conservative
Cambridge University (Two members)	Richard Claverhouse Jebb	Conservative
Cambridge University (Two members)	Sir John Eldon Gorst	Conservative
Canterbury	John Henniker-Heaton	Conservative
Cardiff District	Sir Edward Reed	Liberal
Cardiganshire	Matthew Vaughan-Davies	Liberal
Carlisle	William Gully	Liberal (Speaker)
County Carlow	John Hammond	Healyite Nationalist
Carmarthen District	Alfred Davies	Liberal
Carmarthenshire East	Abel Thomas	Liberal
Carmarthenshire West	John Lloyd Morgan	Liberal
Carnarvon	David Lloyd George	Liberal
Cavan East	Samuel Young	Irish Parliamentary Party
Cavan West	Thomas McGovern	Irish Parliamentary Party
Chatham	Sir Horatio Davies	Conservative
Chelmsford	Carne Rasch	Conservative
Chelsea	Charles Algernon Whitmore	Conservative
Cheltenham	James Agg-Gardner	Conservative
Chertsey	Henry Leigh-Bennett	Conservative
Chester	Robert Yerburgh	Conservative
Chester-le-Street	Sir James Joicey, Bt	Liberal
Chesterfield	Thomas Bayley	Liberal
Chesterton	Raymond Greene	Conservative
Chichester	Edmund Talbot	Conservative
Chippenham	Sir John Dickson-Poynder, Bt	Conservative*
Chorley	Lord Balniel	Conservative
Christchurch	Kenneth Balfour	Conservative
Cirencester	Hon. Benjamin Bathurst	Conservative
Clackmannan and Kinrossshire	Eugene Wason	Liberal
Clapham	Percy Thornton	Conservative
Clare East	Willie Redmond	Irish Parliamentary Party
Clare West	John Eustace Jameson	Irish Parliamentary Party
Cleveland	Alfred Pease	Liberal
Clitheroe	Sir Ughtred Kay-Shuttleworth, Bt	Liberal
Cockermouth	Sir John Scurrah Randles	Conservative
Colchester	Sir Weetman Pearson, Bt	Liberal
Colne Valley	Sir James Kitson, Bt	Liberal
Cork City (Two members)	J. F. X. O'Brien	Irish Parliamentary Party
Cork City (Two members)	William O'Brien	Irish Parliamentary Party
County Cork East	Anthony Donelan	Irish Parliamentary Party
County Cork Mid	Charles Kearns Deane Tanner	Irish Parliamentary Party
County Cork North	James Christopher Flynn	Irish Parliamentary Party
County Cork North East	William Abraham	Irish Parliamentary Party
County Cork South	Edward Barry	Irish Parliamentary Party
County Cork South East	Eugene Crean	Irish Parliamentary Party
County Cork West	James Gilhooly	Irish Parliamentary Party
Coventry	Charles James Murray	Conservative
Crewe	James Tomkinson	Liberal
Cricklade	Lord Edmond Fitzmaurice	Liberal
Croydon	Charles Ritchie	Conservative
== D ==
Darlington	Herbert Pease	Liberal Unionist
Dartford	Sir William Hart Dyke, Bt	Conservative
Darwen	John Rutherford	Conservative
Denbigh District	George Thomas Kenyon	Conservative
Denbighshire East	Samuel Moss	Liberal
Denbighshire West	John Roberts	Liberal
Deptford	Arthur Henry Aylmer Morton	Conservative
Derby (Two members)	Sir Thomas Roe	Liberal
Derby (Two members)	Richard Bell	Labour
Derbyshire Mid	James Alfred Jacoby	Liberal
Derbyshire North East	Thomas Bolton	Liberal
Derbyshire South	John Gretton	Conservative
Derbyshire West	Victor Cavendish	Liberal Unionist
Devizes	Edward Goulding	Conservative
Devonport (Two members)	Hudson Kearley	Liberal
Devonport (Two members)	E. J. C. Morton	Liberal
Dewsbury	Mark Oldroyd	Liberal
Doncaster	Frederick Fison	Conservative
Donegal East	Edward McFadden	Irish Parliamentary Party
Donegal North	William O'Doherty	Irish Parliamentary Party
Donegal South	J. G. Swift MacNeill	Irish Parliamentary Party
Donegal West	James Boyle	Irish Parliamentary Party
Dorset East	Hon. Humphrey Sturt	Conservative
Dorset North	John Wingfield-Digby	Conservative
Dorset South	William Brymer	Conservative
Dorset West	Robert Williams	Conservative
Dover	George Wyndham	Conservative
Down East	James Alexander Rentoul	Irish Unionist
Down North	Thomas Lorimer Corbett	Irish Unionist
Down South	Michael McCartan	Irish Parliamentary Party
Down West	Arthur Hill	Irish Unionist
Droitwich	Richard Martin	Liberal Unionist
Dublin North	J. J. Clancy	Irish Parliamentary Party
Dublin South	John Mooney	Irish Parliamentary Party
Dublin College Green	Joseph Nannetti	Irish Parliamentary Party
Dublin Harbour	Timothy Harrington	Irish Parliamentary Party
Dublin St Patrick's	William Field	Irish Parliamentary Party
Dublin St Stephen's Green	James McCann	Irish Parliamentary Party
Dublin University (Two members)	Edward Carson	Conservative
Dublin University (Two members)	William Edward Hartpole Lecky	Liberal Unionist
Dudley	Brooke Robinson	Conservative
Dulwich	Sir John Blundell Maple, Bt	Conservative
Dumbartonshire	Alexander Wylie	Conservative
Dumfries District of Burghs	Sir Robert Reid	Liberal
Dumfriesshire	William Jardine Herries Maxwell	Liberal Unionist
Dundee	Edmund Robertson	Liberal
Dundee	Sir John Leng	Liberal
Durham	Hon. Arthur Elliot	Liberal Unionist
Durham Mid	John Wilson	Liberal-Labour
Durham North West	Llewellyn Atherley-Jones	Liberal
Durham South East	Frederick Lambton	Liberal Unionist
== E ==
Ealing	Lord George Hamilton	Conservative
East Grinstead	Hon. George Goschen	Conservative
Eastbourne	Sir Lindsay Hogg	Conservative
Eccles	Octavius Leigh-Clare	Conservative
Eddisbury	Henry James Tollemache	Conservative
Edinburgh Central	George Mackenzie Brown	Liberal
Edinburgh East	Sir George McCrae	Liberal
Edinburgh South	Sir Andrew Agnew, Bt	Liberal Unionist
Edinburgh West	Sir Lewis McIver, Bt	Liberal Unionist
Edinburgh and St Andrews Universities	Sir John Batty Tuke	Conservative
Egremont	James Robert Bain	Conservative
Eifion	John Bryn Roberts	Liberal
Elgin District of Burghs	Alexander Asher	Liberal
Elgin and Nairnshires	John Edward Gordon	Conservative
Elland	Charles Trevelyan	Liberal
Enfield	Henry Bowles	Conservative
Epping	Mark Lockwood	Conservative
Epsom	William Keswick	Conservative
Eskdale	Claude Lowther	Conservative
Essex South East	Edward Tufnell	Conservative
Evesham	Charles Wigram Long	Conservative
Exeter	Edgar Vincent	Conservative
Eye	Francis Seymour Stevenson	Liberal
== F ==
Falkirk District of Burghs	John Wilson	Liberal Unionist
Fareham	Arthur Lee	Conservative
Faversham	John Howard	Conservative
Fermanagh North	Sir Edward Archdale	Irish Unionist
Fermanagh South	Jeremiah Jordan	Irish Parliamentary Party
Fife East	H. H. Asquith	Liberal
Fife West	John Deans Hope	Liberal
Finsbury Central	William Massey-Mainwaring	Conservative
Finsbury East	Henry Charles Richards	Conservative
Flint District	Herbert Lewis	Liberal
Flintshire	Samuel Smith	Liberal
Forest of Dean	Sir Charles Dilke, Bt	Liberal
Forfarshire	John Sinclair	Liberal
Frome	John Barlow	Liberal
Fulham	William Hayes Fisher	Conservative
== G ==
Gainsborough	Seymour Fitzroy Ormsby-Gore	Conservative
Galway Borough	Hon. Martin Morris	Irish Unionist
Galway Connemara	William O'Malley	Irish Parliamentary Party
County Galway East	John Roche	Irish Parliamentary Party
County Galway North	John Philip Nolan	Irish Parliamentary Party
County Galway South	William Duffy	Irish Parliamentary Party
Gateshead	Sir William Allan	Liberal
Glamorganshire East	Alfred Thomas	Liberal
Glamorganshire Mid	Samuel Evans	Liberal
Glamorganshire South	Windham Wyndham-Quin	Conservative
Glasgow Blackfriars and Hutchesontown	Bonar Law	Conservative
Glasgow Bridgeton	Charles Dickson	Conservative
Glasgow Camlachie	Alexander Cross	Liberal Unionist
Glasgow Central	John George Alexander Baird	Conservative
Glasgow College	Sir John Stirling-Maxwell, Bt	Conservative
Glasgow St Rollox	John Wilson	Liberal Unionist
Glasgow Tradeston	Archibald Corbett	Liberal Unionist
Glasgow and Aberdeen Universities	James Alexander Campbell	Conservative
Gloucester	Russell Rea	Liberal
Gorton	Ernest Hatch	Conservative
Govan	Robert Hunter Craig	Liberal
Gower District	John Aeron Thomas	Liberal
Grantham	Sir Arthur Priestley	Liberal
Gravesend	Sir Gilbert Parker	Conservative
Great Grimsby	Sir George Doughty	Liberal Unionist
Great Yarmouth	Sir John Colomb	Conservative
Greenock	James Reid	Conservative
Greenwich	Hugh Cecil	Conservative
Guildford	Hon. St John Brodrick	Conservative
== H ==
Hackney Central	Augustus Allhusen	Conservative
Hackney North	William Robert Bousfield	Conservative
Hackney South	Thomas Herbert Robertson	Conservative
Haddingtonshire	Richard Haldane	Liberal
Haggerston	Randal Cremer	Liberal-Labour
Halifax (Two members)	Sir Savile Crossley, Bt	Liberal Unionist
Halifax (Two members)	John Henry Whitley	Liberal
Hallamshire	Sir Frederick Mappin, Bt	Liberal
Hammersmith	William Bull	Conservative
Hampstead	Edward Brodie Hoare	Conservative
Handsworth	Sir Henry Meysey-Thompson, Bt	Liberal Unionist
Hanley	Arthur Heath	Conservative
Harborough	John William Logan	Liberal
Harrow	Irwin Cox	Conservative
Hartlepools, The	Christopher Furness	Liberal
Harwich	James Round	Conservative
Hastings	Freeman Freeman-Thomas	Liberal
Hawick District of Burghs	Thomas Shaw	Liberal
Henley	Robert Hodge	Conservative
Hereford	John Arkwright	Conservative
Hertford	Abel Smith	Conservative
Hexham	Wentworth Beaumont	Liberal
Heywood	George Kemp	Liberal Unionist*
High Peak	Oswald Partington	Liberal
Hitchin	George Hudson	Conservative
Holborn	James Remnant	Conservative
Holderness	Arthur Wilson	Conservative
Holmfirth	Henry Wilson	Liberal
Honiton	Sir John Kennaway, Bt	Conservative
Horncastle	Lord Willoughby de Eresby	Conservative
Hornsey	Charles Balfour	Conservative
Horsham	John Heywood Johnstone	Conservative
Houghton-le-Spring	Robert Cameron	Liberal
Howdenshire	William Wilson-Todd	Conservative
Hoxton	Claude Hay	Conservative
Huddersfield	Sir James Woodhouse, Bt	Liberal
Huntingdon	George Montagu	Conservative
Hyde	Edward Chapman	Conservative
Hythe	Sir Edward Sassoon, Bt	Conservative
== I ==
Ilkeston	Sir Walter Foster	Liberal
Ince	Henry Blundell	Conservative
Inverness District of Burghs	Robert Finlay	Liberal Unionist
Inverness-shire	Sir John Dewar, Bt.	Liberal
Ipswich (Two members)	Daniel Ford Goddard	Liberal
Ipswich (Two members)	Sir Charles Dalrymple, Bt	Conservative
Isle of Thanet	James Lowther	Conservative
Isle of Wight	J. E. B. Seely	Conservative*
Islington East	Benjamin Cohen	Conservative
Islington North	George Trout Bartley	Conservative
Islington South	Sir Albert Rollit	Conservative
Islington West	Thomas Lough	Liberal
== J ==
Jarrow	Sir Charles Palmer, Bt	Liberal
== K ==
Keighley	John Brigg	Liberal
Kendal	Josceline Bagot	Conservative
Kennington	Frederick Cook	Conservative
Kensington North	William Sharpe	Conservative
Kensington South	Henry Percy	Conservative
Kerry East	John Murphy	Irish Parliamentary Party
Kerry North	Michael Joseph Flavin	Irish Parliamentary Party
Kerry South	John Pius Boland	Irish Parliamentary Party
Kerry West	Thomas O'Donnell	Irish Parliamentary Party
Kidderminster	Sir Augustus Godson	Conservative
Kildare North	Edmund Leamy	Irish Parliamentary Party
Kildare South	Matthew Minch	Irish Parliamentary Party
Kilkenny City	Pat O'Brien	Irish Parliamentary Party
County Kilkenny North	Patrick McDermott	Irish Parliamentary Party
County Kilkenny South	James O'Mara	Irish Parliamentary Party
Kilmarnock Burghs	John McAusland Denny	Conservative
Kincardineshire	John William Crombie	Liberal
King's Lynn	Thomas Gibson Bowles	Conservative
Kingston upon Hull Central	Seymour King	Conservative
Kingston upon Hull East	Thomas Firbank	Conservative
Kingston upon Hull West	Charles Wilson	Liberal
Kingston-upon-Thames	Thomas Skewes-Cox	Conservative
Kingswinford	William George Webb	Conservative
Kirkcaldy District of Burghs	James Dalziel	Liberal
Kirkcudbrightshire	Sir Mark MacTaggart-Stewart, Bt	Conservative
Knutsford	Hon. Alan Egerton	Conservative
== L ==
Lambeth North	Frederick William Horner	Conservative
Lanarkshire Mid	James Caldwell	Liberal
Lanarkshire North East	John Colville	Liberal
Lanarkshire North West	Charles Mackinnon Douglas	Liberal
Lanarkshire South	Hon. James Hozier	Conservative
Lancaster	Sir Norval Helme	Liberal
Launceston	Sir John Fletcher Moulton	Liberal
Leeds Central	Gerald Balfour	Conservative
Leeds East	Henry Cautley	Conservative
Leeds North	William Jackson	Conservative
Leeds South	John Lawson Walton	Liberal
Leeds West	Herbert Gladstone	Liberal
Leek	Charles Bill	Conservative
Leicester (Two members)	Henry Broadhurst	Liberal-Labour
Leicester (Two members)	Sir John Rolleston	Conservative
Leigh	C. P. Scott	Liberal
Leith District of Burghs	Ronald Munro-Ferguson	Liberal
Leitrim North	P. A. McHugh	Irish Parliamentary Party
Leitrim South	Jasper Tully	Irish Parliamentary Party
Leix	Mark MacDonnell	Irish Parliamentary Party
Leominster	Sir James Rankin, Bt	Conservative
Lewes	Sir Henry Fletcher, Bt	Conservative
Lewisham	John Penn	Conservative
Lichfield	Courtenay Warner	Liberal
Limehouse	Harry Samuel	Conservative
Limerick City	Michael Joyce	Irish Parliamentary Party
County Limerick East	William Lundon	Irish Parliamentary Party
County Limerick West	Patrick O'Shaughnessy	Irish Parliamentary Party
Lincoln	Charles Seely	Liberal Unionist
Linlithgowshire	Alexander Ure	Liberal
Liverpool Abercromby	William Lawrence	Conservative
Liverpool Everton	Sir John A. Willox	Conservative
Liverpool Exchange	Charles McArthur	Liberal Unionist
Liverpool Kirkdale	David MacIver	Conservative
Liverpool Scotland	T. P. O'Connor	Irish Parliamentary Party
Liverpool East Toxteth	Augustus Frederick Warr	Conservative
Liverpool West Toxteth	Robert Houston	Conservative
Liverpool Walton	James Henry Stock	Conservative
Liverpool West Derby	Samuel Higginbottom	Conservative
London, City of	Sir Joseph Dimsdale, Bt	Conservative
London, City of	Hon. Alban Gibbs	Conservative
London University	Sir Michael Foster	Liberal Unionist*
Londonderry	James Hamilton	Irish Unionist
Londonderry North	John Atkinson	Irish Unionist
Londonderry South	John Gordon	Liberal Unionist
Longford North	J. P. Farrell	Irish Parliamentary Party
Longford South	Edward Blake	Irish Parliamentary Party
North Lonsdale	Richard Cavendish	Liberal Unionist
Loughborough	Sir Maurice Levy	Liberal
Louth	Robert Perks	Liberal
Louth North	Tim Healy	Healyite Nationalist
Louth South	Joseph Nolan	Healyite Nationalist
Lowestoft	Francis Lucas	Conservative
Ludlow	Robert Jasper More	Liberal Unionist
Luton	Thomas Ashton	Liberal
== M ==
Macclesfield	William Bromley-Davenport	Conservative
Maidstone	Sir John Barker	Liberal
Maldon	Hon. Charles Hedley Strutt	Conservative
Manchester East	Arthur Balfour	Conservative
Manchester North	Charles Swann	Liberal
Manchester North East	Sir James Fergusson, Bt	Conservative
Manchester North West	Sir William Houldsworth, Bt	Conservative
Manchester South	Hon. William Peel	Liberal Unionist
Manchester South West	William Johnson Galloway	Conservative
Mansfield	Sir Arthur Markham	Liberal
Marylebone East	Edmund Boulnois	Conservative
Marylebone West	Sir Samuel Scott, Bt	Conservative
Mayo East	John Dillon	Irish Parliamentary Party
Mayo North	Conor O'Kelly	Irish Parliamentary Party
Mayo South	John O'Donnell	Irish Parliamentary Party
Mayo West	Robert Ambrose	Irish Parliamentary Party
Meath North	Patrick White	Irish Parliamentary Party
Meath South	James Laurence Carew	Healyite Nationalist
Medway	Charles Warde	Conservative
Melton	Cecil Manners	Conservative
Merionethshire	Sir Osmond Williams	Liberal
Merthyr Tydfil (Two members)	David Alfred Thomas	Liberal
Merthyr Tydfil (Two members)	Keir Hardie	Labour
Middlesbrough	Samuel Sadler	Conservative
Middleton	Edward Brocklehurst Fielden	Conservative
Midlothian	The Master of Elibank	Liberal
Mile End	Spencer Charrington	Conservative
Monaghan North	Daniel MacAleese	Irish Parliamentary Party
Monaghan South	James Daly	Irish Parliamentary Party
Monmouth Boroughs	Frederick Rutherfoord Harris	Conservative
Monmouthshire North	Reginald McKenna	Liberal
Monmouthshire South	Frederick Courtenay Morgan	Conservative
Monmouthshire West	Sir William Vernon Harcourt	Liberal
Montgomery District	Edward Pryce-Jones	Conservative
Montgomeryshire	Arthur Humphreys-Owen	Liberal
Montrose District of Burghs	John Morley	Liberal
Morley	Alfred Hutton	Liberal
Morpeth	Thomas Burt	Liberal-Labour
== N ==
New Forest	Hon. John Douglas-Scott-Montagu	Conservative
Newark	Sir Charles Welby, Bt	Conservative
Newbury	William Mount	Conservative
Newcastle-upon-Tyne (Two members)	Sir Walter Plummer	Conservative
Newcastle-upon-Tyne (Two members)	George Renwick	Conservative
Newcastle-under-Lyme	Sir Alfred Seale Haslam	Liberal Unionist
Newington West	Cecil Norton	Liberal
Newmarket	Harry McCalmont	Conservative
Newport	William Kenyon-Slaney	Conservative
Newry	Patrick Carvill	Irish Parliamentary Party
Newton	Richard Pilkington	Conservative
Norfolk East	Robert John Price	Liberal
Norfolk Mid	Frederick William Wilson	Liberal
Norfolk North	Sir William Brampton Gurdon	Liberal
Norfolk North West	Sir George White	Liberal
Norfolk South	Arthur Wellesley Soames	Liberal
Norfolk South West	Thomas Hare	Conservative
Normanton	Benjamin Pickard	Liberal-Labour
Northampton (Two members)	Henry Labouchère	Liberal
Northampton (Two members)	John Greenwood Shipman	Liberal
Northamptonshire East	Francis Channing	Liberal
Northamptonshire Mid	Hon. Charles Spencer	Liberal
Northamptonshire North	Sackville Stopford-Sackville	Conservative
Northamptonshire South	Hon. Edward FitzRoy	Conservative
Northwich	Sir John Brunner, Bt	Liberal
Norwich (Two members)	Sir Samuel Hoare, Bt	Conservative
Norwich (Two members)	Sir Harry Bullard	Conservative
Norwood	Ernest Tritton	Conservative
Nottingham East	Edward Bond	Conservative
Nottingham South	Lord Henry Cavendish-Bentinck	Conservative
Nottingham West	James Yoxall	Liberal
Nuneaton	Francis Newdegate	Conservative
== O ==
Oldham (Two members)	Alfred Emmott	Liberal
Oldham (Two members)	Winston Churchill	Conservative*
Orkney and Shetland	Cathcart Wason	Liberal Unionist*
Ormskirk	Hon. Arthur Stanley	Conservative
Osgoldcross	Sir John Austin	Independent Liberal
Ossory	William Delany	Irish Parliamentary Party
Oswestry	Stanley Leighton	Conservative
Otley	Sir James Hastings Duncan	Liberal
Oxford	The Viscount Valentia	Conservative
Oxford University (Two members)	John Gilbert Talbot	Conservative
Oxford University (Two members)	Sir William Anson, Bt	Liberal Unionist
== P ==
Paddington North	John Aird	Conservative
Paddington South	Sir George Fardell	Conservative
Paisley	Sir William Dunn, Bt	Liberal
Partick	James Parker Smith	Liberal Unionist
Peckham	Frederick Banbury	Conservative
Peebles and Selkirk	Walter Thorburn	Liberal Unionist
Pembroke and Haverfordwest District	John Laurie	Conservative
Pembrokeshire	Sir John Philipps	Liberal
Penrith	James Lowther	Conservative
Penryn and Falmouth	Frederick John Horniman	Liberal
Perth	Robert Wallace	Liberal
Perthshire Eastern	Sir John Kinloch, Bt	Liberal
Perthshire Western	John Stroyan	Liberal Unionist
Peterborough	Robert Purvis	Liberal Unionist
Petersfield	William Graham Nicholson	Conservative
Plymouth (Two members)	Henry Duke	Conservative
Plymouth (Two members)	Hon. Ivor Guest	Conservative*
Pontefract	Thomas Nussey	Liberal
Poplar	Sydney Buxton	Liberal
Portsmouth (Two members)	Reginald Lucas	Conservative
Portsmouth (Two members)	James Majendie	Conservative
Preston (Two members)	Robert William Hanbury	Conservative
Preston (Two members)	William Tomlinson	Conservative
Prestwich	Frederick Cawley	Liberal
Pudsey	George Whiteley	Liberal
== R ==
Radcliffe-cum-Farnworth	Theodore Cooke Taylor	Liberal
Radnorshire	Francis Edwards	Liberal
Ramsey	Ailwyn Fellowes	Conservative
Reading	George William Palmer	Liberal
Reigate	Hon. Henry Cubitt	Conservative
Renfrewshire East	Hugh Shaw-Stewart	Conservative
Renfrewshire West	Charles Renshaw	Conservative
Rhondda	William Abraham	Liberal-Labour
Richmond	John Hutton	Conservative
Ripon	John Lloyd Wharton	Conservative
Rochdale	Clement Royds	Conservative
Rochester	Viscount Cranborne	Conservative
Romford	Louis Sinclair	Conservative
Roscommon North	James Joseph O'Kelly	Irish Parliamentary Party
Roscommon South	John Patrick Hayden	Irish Parliamentary Party
Ross	Percy Clive	Liberal Unionist
Ross and Cromarty	James Galloway Weir	Liberal
Rossendale	William Mather	Liberal
Rotherham	William Holland	Liberal
Rotherhithe	John Macdona	Conservative
Roxburghshire	The Earl of Dalkeith	Conservative
Rugby	Corrie Grant	Liberal
Rushcliffe	John Ellis	Liberal
Rutland	George Finch	Conservative
Rye	Arthur Montagu Brookfield	Conservative
== S ==
Saffron Walden	Hon. Armine Wodehouse	Liberal
St Albans	Hon. Vicary Gibbs	Conservative
St Andrews District of Burghs	Henry Torrens Anstruther	Liberal Unionist
St Augustine's	Aretas Akers-Douglas	Conservative
St Austell	William Alexander McArthur	Liberal
St George, Hanover Square	Heneage Legge	Conservative
St George, Tower Hamlets	Thomas Dewar	Conservative
St Helens	Henry Seton-Karr	Conservative
St Ives	Edward Hain	Liberal Unionist*
St Pancras East	Sir Thomas Wrightson, Bt	Conservative
St Pancras North	Edward Moon	Conservative
St Pancras South	Herbert Jessel	Liberal Unionist
St Pancras West	Harry Graham	Conservative
Salford North	Frederick Platt-Higgins	Conservative
Salford South	James Grimble Groves	Conservative
Salford West	Lees Knowles	Conservative
Salisbury	Walter Palmer	Conservative
Scarborough	Joseph Compton-Rickett	Liberal
Sevenoaks	Henry Forster	Conservative
Sheffield Attercliffe	J. Batty Langley	Liberal
Sheffield Brightside	James Hope	Conservative
Sheffield Central	Sir Howard Vincent	Conservative
Sheffield Ecclesall	Sir Ellis Ashmead-Bartlett	Conservative
Sheffield Hallam	Charles Stuart-Wortley	Conservative
Shipley	James Fortescue Flannery	Liberal Unionist
Shrewsbury	Henry Greene	Conservative
Skipton	Frederick Whitley-Thomson	Liberal
Sleaford	Henry Chaplin	Conservative
Sligo North	William McKillop	Irish Parliamentary Party
Sligo South	John O'Dowd	Irish Parliamentary Party
Somerset Eastern	Henry Hobhouse	Liberal Unionist
Somerset Northern	Evan Henry Llewellyn	Conservative
Somerset Southern	Edward Strachey	Liberal
South Molton	George Lambert	Liberal
South Shields	William Robson	Liberal
Southampton (Two members)	Tankerville Chamberlayne	Conservative
Southampton (Two members)	Sir John Simeon, Bt	Liberal Unionist
Southport	Edward Marshall-Hall	Conservative
Southwark West	Richard Causton	Liberal
Sowerby	John William Mellor	Liberal
Spalding	Horace Rendall Mansfield	Liberal
Spen Valley	Thomas Whittaker	Liberal
Stafford	Charles Shaw	Liberal
Staffordshire North West	Sir James Heath	Conservative
Staffordshire West	Alexander Henderson	Liberal Unionist
Stalybridge	Hon. Matthew White Ridley	Conservative
Stamford	William Younger	Conservative
Stepney	Sir William Evans-Gordon	Conservative
Stirling District of Burghs	Sir Henry Campbell-Bannerman	Liberal
Stirlingshire	James McKillop	Conservative
Stockport (Two members)	Sir Joseph Leigh	Liberal
Stockport (Two members)	Beresford Melville	Conservative
Stockton-on-Tees	Sir Robert Ropner	Conservative
Stoke-on-Trent	Douglas Coghill	Conservative
Stowmarket	Ian Malcolm	Conservative
Strand	Hon. Frederick Smith	Conservative
Stratford-on Avon	Victor Milward	Conservative
Stretford	Sir John Maclure, Bt	Conservative
Stroud	Charles Allen	Liberal
Sudbury	Sir Cuthbert Quilter	Liberal Unionist
Sunderland (Two members)	Theodore Doxford	Conservative
Sunderland (Two members)	John Stapylton Grey Pemberton	Conservative
Sutherland	Frederick Leveson-Gower	Liberal Unionist
Swansea District	David Brynmor Jones	Liberal
Swansea Town	Sir George Newnes	Liberal
== T ==
Tamworth	Philip Muntz	Conservative
Taunton	Alfred Welby	Conservative
Tavistock	John Spear	Liberal Unionist
Tewkesbury	Sir John Dorington, Bt	Conservative
Thirsk and Malton	John Lawson	Conservative
Thornbury	Charles Colston	Conservative
Tipperary East	Thomas Condon	Irish Parliamentary Party
Tipperary Mid	Kendal Edmund O'Brien	Irish Parliamentary Party
Tipperary North	Patrick Joseph O'Brien	Irish Parliamentary Party
Tipperary South	John Cullinan	Irish Parliamentary Party
Tiverton	Sir William Walrond, Bt	Conservative
Torquay	Francis Layland-Barratt	Liberal
Totnes	Francis Bingham Mildmay	Liberal Unionist
Tottenham	Joseph Howard	Conservative
Truro	Sir Edwin Durning-Lawrence, Bt	Liberal Unionist
Tullamore	Edmund Haviland-Burke	Irish Parliamentary Party
Tunbridge	Arthur Griffith-Boscawen	Conservative
Tynemouth	Frederick Leverton Harris	Conservative
Tyneside	Hugh Crawford Smith	Liberal Unionist
Tyrone East	Patrick Doogan	Irish Parliamentary Party
Tyrone Mid	George Murnaghan	Irish Parliamentary Party
Tyrone North	Charles Hemphill	Liberal
Tyrone South	Thomas Russell	Liberal Unionist
== U ==
Uxbridge	Sir Frederick Dixon-Hartland, Bt	Conservative
== W ==
Wakefield	Viscount Milton	Liberal Unionist
Walsall	Sir Arthur Hayter, Bt	Liberal
Walthamstow	David John Morgan	Conservative
Walworth	James Bailey	Conservative
Wandsworth	Henry Kimber	Conservative
Wansbeck	Charles Fenwick	Liberal-Labour
Warrington	Robert Pierpont	Conservative
Warwick and Leamington	Hon. Alfred Lyttelton	Liberal Unionist
Waterford City	John Redmond	Irish Parliamentary Party
County Waterford East	Patrick Power	Irish Parliamentary Party
County Waterford West	J. J. O'Shee	Irish Parliamentary Party
Watford	Frederick Halsey	Conservative
Wednesbury	Walford Davis Green	Conservative
Wellington (Salop)	Sir Alexander Brown	Liberal Unionist
Wellington (Somerset)	Sir Alexander Fuller-Acland-Hood, Bt	Conservative
Wells	Robert Dickinson	Conservative
West Bromwich	Ernest Spencer	Conservative
West Ham North	Ernest Gray	Conservative
West Ham South	George Banes	Conservative
Westbury	John Fuller	Liberal
Westhoughton	Edward Stanley	Conservative
Westmeath North	Patrick Kennedy	Healyite Nationalist
Westmeath South	Donal Sullivan	Irish Parliamentary Party
Westminster	William Burdett-Coutts	Conservative
Wexford North	Thomas Esmonde	Irish Parliamentary Party
Wexford South	Peter Ffrench	Irish Parliamentary Party
Whitby	Ernest Beckett	Conservative
Whitechapel	Stuart Samuel	Liberal
Whitehaven	Augustus Helder	Conservative
Wick District of Burghs	Arthur Bignold	Conservative
Wicklow East	Denis Joseph Cogan	Irish Parliamentary Party
Wicklow West	James O'Connor	Irish Parliamentary Party
Widnes	William Walker	Conservative
Wigan	Sir Francis Powell, Bt	Conservative
Wigtownshire	Sir Herbert Maxwell, Bt	Conservative
Wilton	James Morrison	Conservative
Wimbledon	Eric Hambro	Conservative
Winchester	William Myers	Conservative
Windsor	Sir Francis Barry, Bt	Conservative
Wirral	Joseph Hoult	Conservative
Wisbech	Hon. Arthur Brand	Liberal
Wokingham	Oliver Young	Conservative
Wolverhampton East	Sir Henry Fowler	Liberal
Wolverhampton South	Henry Norman	Liberal
Wolverhampton West	Alfred Hickman	Conservative
Woodbridge	E. G. Pretyman	Conservative
Woodstock	George Herbert Morrell	Conservative
Woolwich	Edwin Hughes	Conservative
Worcester	George Allsopp	Conservative
Worcestershire East	Austen Chamberlain	Liberal Unionist
Worcestershire North	John William Wilson	Liberal Unionist*
Wycombe	William Grenfell	Conservative
== Y ==
York (Two members)	John Butcher	Conservative
York (Two members)	Denison Faber	Conservative

== By-elections ==
7 May 1901: Monmouth Boroughs -- Joseph Lawrence (Conservative) replacing Dr Frederick Rutherfoord Harris (Conservative) who had been unseated after an election petition alleging electoral irregularities was granted on 3 April.

17 May 1901: County Cork Mid -- D. D. Sheehan (Irish Parliamentary Party) replacing Dr Charles K. D. Tanner (Irish Parliamentary Party) who died on 21 April.

31 May 1901: Saffron Walden -- Jack Pease, replacing Armine Wodehouse, who died on 1 May.

26 February 1902: North Kilkenny -- Joseph Devlin (Irish Parliamentary Party), replacing Patrick McDermott (Irish Parliamentary Party), who . . . . . .

March 1902: Wakefield -- Edward Allen Brotherton replacing William Wentworth-FitzWilliam, 7th Earl FitzWilliam, who inherited his title on the death of his grandfather.

4 March 1902: Monaghan South - John McKean (Irish Parliamentary Party) replacing James Daly (Irish Parliamentary Party) who had resigned.

May 1902: Bury -- George Toulmin (Liberal) replacing James Kenyon (Conservative)

5 November 1902: Cleveland -- Herbert Samuel (Liberal) replacing Alfred Edward Pease (Liberal), who resigned due to the bankruptcy of the family firm.

18-19 November 1902: Orkney and Shetland -- Cathcart Wason resigned after defecting from the Liberal Unionist Party to become an Independent Liberal, and won the following by-election

26 February 1903: Perthshire Eastern -- Thomas Buchanan (Liberal) replacing Sir John Kinloch (Liberal), who had resigned.

9 October 1903: Meath South - David Sheehy (Irish Parliamentary Party) replacing James Laurence Carew (Independent Nationalist) who died on 31 August.

1903: Dublin University - James Campbell (Unionist) replacing William Lecky (Unionist) who died on 22 October 1903

15 December 1903: Dulwich - Frederick Rutherfoord Harris (Conservative) replacing Sir John Blundell Maple (Conservative) who had died

15 December 1903: Lewisham - Major Edward Coates (Conservative) replacing John Penn (Conservative) who had died

19 August 1904: Cork City -- William O'Brien (Irish Parliamentary Party) replacing William O'Brien (Irish Parliamentary Party) after resigning his seat in January

14 June 1905: Cork City -- Augustine Roche (Irish Parliamentary Party) replacing J. F. X. O'Brien (Irish Parliamentary Party) who died on 23 May.

== Defections ==
John William Wilson (MP for Worcestershire North) was elected as a Liberal Unionist, but defected to the Liberal Party sometime between 1900 and 1906.

Sir Michael Foster (MP for London University) was elected as a Liberal Unionist, but defected to the Liberal Party in 1903.

Winston Churchill (MP for Oldham) was elected as a Conservative, but defected to the Liberal Party in 1904.

Edward Hain (MP for St Ives) was elected as a Liberal Unionist, but defected to the Liberal Party in 1904.

Hon. Ivor Guest (MP for Plymouth) was elected as a Conservative, but defected to the Liberal Party in 1904.

J. E. B. Seely (MP for the Isle of Wight) was elected as a Conservative, but defected to the Liberal Party in 1904.

George Kemp (MP for Heywood) was elected as a Liberal Unionist, but defected to the Liberal Party in 1904.

Sir John Dickson-Poynder, Bt (MP for Chippenham) was elected as a Conservative, but defected to the Liberal Party in 1905.

John Eustace Jameson, MP for West Clare UK Parliament Constituency was elected as an Irish Parliamentary Party, but defected to the Irish Unionist Alliance in 1904.

== See also ==
- 1900 United Kingdom general election
- List of MPs for constituencies in Wales (1900–1906)
- List of parliaments of the United Kingdom
