= 1918 in Ireland =

- Centuries: 18th; 19th; 20th; 21st
- Decades: 1890s; 1900s; 1910s; 1920s; 1930s
- See also: 1918 in the United Kingdom; Other events of 1918; List of years in Ireland

Events from the year 1918 in Ireland.

== Events ==
- 18 January – Count Plunkett, Seán T. O'Kelly and others protested at the forcible feeding of Sinn Féin prisoners in Mountjoy Prison.
- 5 February – SS Tuscania (1914) was torpedoed off the Irish coast; it was the first ship carrying United States troops to Europe to be torpedoed and sunk.
- 1 March – Imperial German Navy U-boat SM U-19 sank HMS Calgarian off Rathlin Island.
- 2 March – In Skibbereen, County Cork, Ernest Blythe was arrested for non-compliance with a military rule directing him to reside in Ulster.
- 6 March – In the British House of Commons, tributes were paid to John Redmond, Irish Nationalist leader, who died in London.
- 18 April – The Military Service Bill, which included conscription in Ireland, became law. A conference of nationalist parties, Sinn Féin, and labour movements met in Dublin to organise an all-Ireland opposition to conscription.
- 20 April – The Irish Parliamentary Party held a meeting in Dublin to oppose conscription.
- 23 April – There was a general strike in opposition to conscription.
- May – The RAF Aldergrove air force station opened near Antrim.
- 5 May – 15,000 people attend an anti-conscription meeting in County Roscommon. John Dillon, leader of the Irish Parliamentary Party and Éamon de Valera of Sinn Féin share the platform in a united cause.
- 9 May – Field Marshal Sir John French, Viscount French of Ypres and of High Lake in the County of Roscommon, was appointed Lord Lieutenant of Ireland and Supreme Commander of the British Army in Ireland.
- 20 May – A special anti-conscription convention was held in Dublin. It condemned the arrest and deportation of Sinn Féin members consequent to the "German Plot".
- 20 June – Arthur Griffith of Sinn Féin won a by-election in East Cavan. It was Sinn Féin's first victory of the year after three successive by-election defeats.
- 3 July – The Lord Lieutenant issued a proclamation banning Sinn Féin, the Irish Volunteers, the Gaelic League and Cumann na mBan.
- 17 July – RMS Carpathia was torpedoed and sunk off the east coast of Ireland by Imperial German Navy U-boat SM U-55; 218 of the 223 people on board were rescued.
- 20 July – Troopship SS Justicia was torpedoed and sunk off the north coast of Ireland by Imperial German Navy U-boat SM UB-124 while under tow after surviving torpedo damage the previous day; she was unladen and most of the crew were evacuated.
- 10 October – The Irish mail boat RMS Leinster was sunk in the Irish Sea by Imperial German Navy U-boat SM UB-123 with the loss of over 500 lives.
- 11 November – At 5 am, an armistice dictated by the Allies was signed by the Germans. Six hours later World War I officially ended. Well over 206,000 Irishmen had served and over 35,000 were killed during the war; there was no Irish parish without a loss.
- 22 December – Ireland voiced a united invitation to President Woodrow Wilson of the United States to visit.

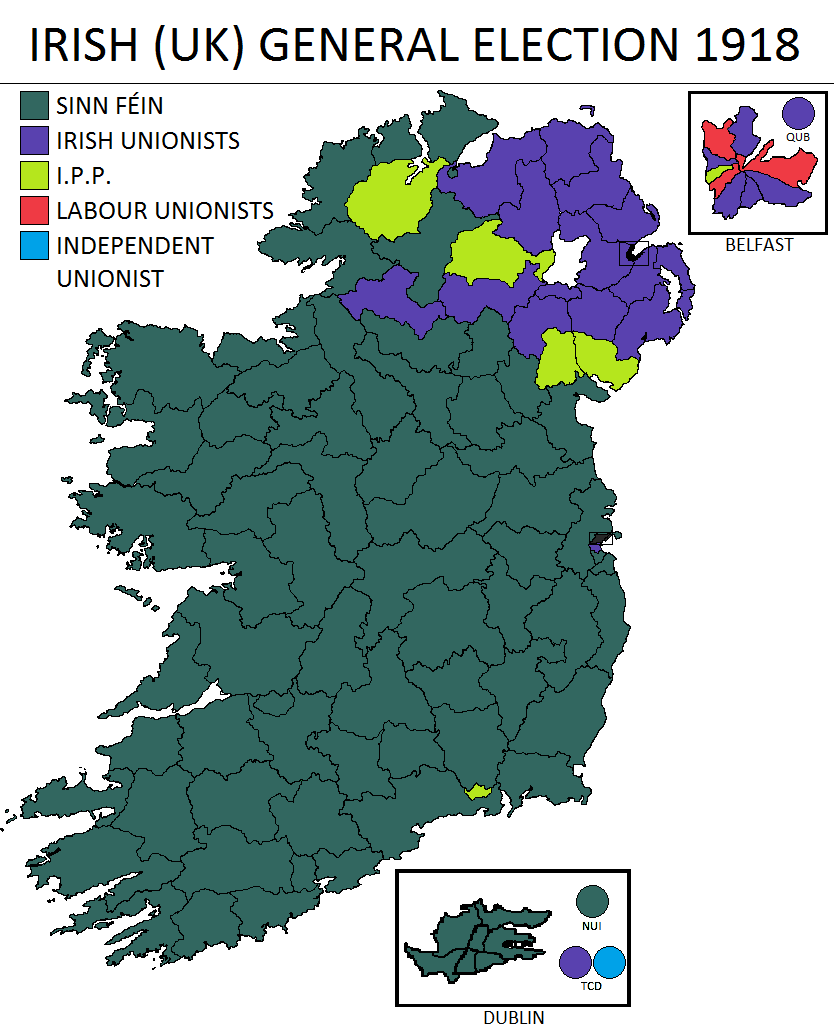
Sinn Féin's December election landslide

- 28 December – 1918 general election: Sinn Féin won a landslide victory in the election, winning 73 of the 105 seats in Ireland. The Irish Parliamentary Party was nearly wiped out. In accordance with their 1918 manifesto, Sinn Féin members did not take their seats in the House of Commons of the United Kingdom but formed instead Dáil Éireann (Irish parliament). Constance Markievicz, while detained in Holloway Prison in London, became the first woman elected to the Palace of Westminster, but she did not take her seat. On 30 December, the Irish Independent newspaper criticised her strongly.

== Arts and literature ==
- March – the Telemachus episode of James Joyce's novel Ulysses was published (in serialised form) in the American journal The Little Review.
- 25 May – James Joyce's Exiles: a play in three acts was published in London.
- August – Anglo-Welsh composer Philip Heseltine concluded a year's stay in Ireland with the writing of a number of songs which would be published under the pseudonym Peter Warlock.
- Francis Ledwidge's poems Last Songs were published posthumously, edited by Lord Dunsany.
- Toirdhealbhach Mac Suibhne (Terence MacSwiney)'s poems Battle-cries were published in Cork.
- "Brinsley MacNamara" (John Weldon writing as "Oliver Blyth") published his novel The Valley of the Squinting Windows.

== Sport ==
=== Association football ===
- Irish League
  Winners: Linfield
  Irish Cup
  Winners: Belfast Celtic 0–0, 0–0, 2–0 Linfield

=== Gaelic Athletic Association (GAA) ===
- All Ireland Senior Hurling Final
  Limerick 9–5 d Wexford 1–3
  All Ireland Senior Football Final
  Wexford 0–5 d Tipperary 0–4

== Births ==
- January – John Coffey, Tipperary hurler (died 2019).
- 18 January – Jim Langton, Kilkenny hurler (died 1987).
- 23 January – Charlie Kerins, Chief of Staff of the IRA, convicted of murder of Garda Síochána officer; (hanged in 1944).
- 26 January – Louis Jacobson, cricketer (died 2013).
- 7 February – Markey Robinson, painter (died 1999).
- 14 February
  - Thomas J. Fitzpatrick, Ceann Comhairle and Fine Gael party teachta dála (TD) and cabinet minister (died 2006).
  - Valentin Iremonger, poet and diplomat (died 1991).
- 3 March – Peter O'Sullevan, horseracing commentator (died 2015 in England).
- 5 March – Denis J. O'Sullivan, Fine Gael TD (died 1987).
- 17 March – Frederick Blaney, cricketer (died 1988).
- 12 March – Pádraig Faulkner, Fianna Fáil party TD for Louth and cabinet minister (died 2012).
- 16 April – Spike Milligan, comedian, poet and writer (born in the British Raj; died 2002 in England).
- 22 May – Alan Clodd, book collector, dealer and publisher (died 2002).
- 5 June – Gladys Maccabe, painter (died 2018).
- 23 June – James Young, comedian (died 1974).
- 27 June – Marie Kean, actress (died 1993).
- 7 August – Florrie Burke, association football player (died 1995).
- 9 August – Luke Belton, Fine Gael TD (died 2006).
- 29 August – John Herivel, historian of science and cryptanalyst (died 2011).
- 12 September – Valerie Goulding, senator and campaigner for disabled people (died 2003).
- 17 September – Chaim Herzog, Belfast-born sixth President of Israel (1983–1993) (died 1997).
- 22 September – A. J. Potter, composer (died 1980).
- 26 September – Jackie Vernon, footballer (died 1981).
- 29 September – Douglas Gageby, journalist and Irish Times newspaper editor (died 2004).
- 13 October – Jack MacGowran, actor (died 1973).
- October – Hugh McLaughlin, publisher and inventor (died 2006).
- 19 November – Brendan Corish, Labour Party leader, TD, cabinet minister and tánaiste (died 1990).
- 24 December – Willie Clancy, uileann piper (died 1973).
- Full date unknown – Terry Leahy, Kilkenny hurler (died 1988).

== Deaths ==
- 6 January – Dora Sigerson Shorter, poet and sculptor (born 1866; died in London).
- 23 January – Robert Gregory, cricketer and artist (born 1881).
- 1 February – William Melville, police officer and first chief of the British Secret Service (born 1850.
- 13 February – Henry Arthur Blake, British colonial administrator and Governor of Hong Kong (born 1840).
- 27 March – Martin Sheridan, Olympic gold medallist for the United States (born 1881).
- 28 March – Arthur Bateman, cricketer (born 1890).
- 8 April – David Nelson, soldier, recipient of the Victoria Cross for gallantry in 1914 at Néry, France (born 1886).
- 18 April – Samuel Young, 96-year-old member of parliament for East Cavan
- 7 May – James Somers, soldier, recipient of the Victoria Cross for gallantry in 1915 at Gallipoli, Turkey (born 1884).
- 10 June – William Parsons, 5th Earl of Rosse, soldier (born 1873).
- 19 July – William McDonnell, 6th Earl of Antrim, peer (born 1851).
- 26 July – Edward Mannock, First World War flying ace and posthumous recipient of the Victoria Cross (born 1887).
- 31 July – George McElroy, Royal Flying Corps and Royal Air Force pilot during World War I, killed in action (born 1893).
- 18 September – Claude Joseph Patrick Nunney, recipient of the Victoria Cross for gallantry in 1918 on the Drocourt-Queant Line, France (born 1892).
- 25 September – John Ireland, third bishop and first Archbishop of Saint Paul, Minnesota (born 1838).
- 1 October – Martin Joseph Sheehan, soldier and Royal Air Service Observer in World War I, killed in action (born 1896).
- 14 October – Louis Lipsett, British Army and Canadian Expeditionary Force senior officer during the First World War, killed in action (born 1874).
- 14 November – Seumas O'Kelly, journalist and author (born 1881)
