= 1918 East Cavan by-election =

UK parliamentary by-election

- 20 June 1918

Constituency of East Cavan
- Turnout: 72.3%
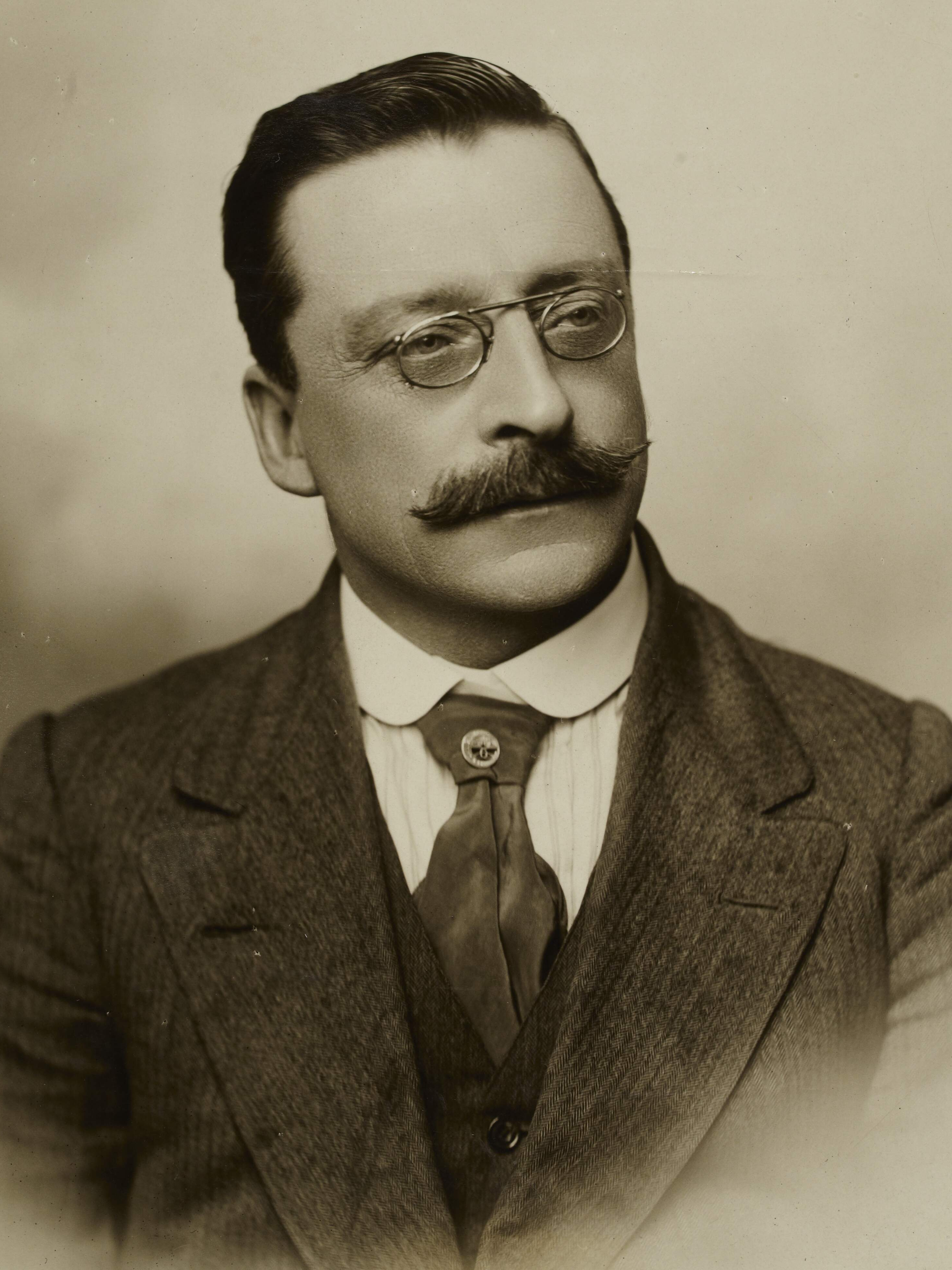
	First party	Second party
		IPP
Candidate	Arthur Griffith	John O'Hanlon
Party	Sinn Féin	Irish Parliamentary
Popular vote	3,785	2,581
Percentage	59.5%	40.5%
MP before election
Samuel Young
Irish Parliamentary
Subsequent MP
Arthur Griffith
Sinn Féin

The 1918 East Cavan by-election was a parliamentary by-election held for the United Kingdom House of Commons constituency of East Cavan on 20 June 1918. The election was caused by the death of the sitting member, Samuel Young of the Irish Parliamentary Party.

== Background ==
It had been clear for a long time that a by-election was likely, for Young was 96 years old and had been in poor health; Sinn Féin's preparations had begun as long as a year in advance. Within days of his death, the party's founder and former leader Arthur Griffith was nominated as its candidate.

The political climate was tense. Having won four by-elections in 1917 - in North Roscommon, South Longford, East Clare and Kilkenny City - Sinn Féin had appeared to be winning a majority of support of the nationalist population. However, since the beginning of the year the Irish Parliamentary Party (IPP) had won three seats - South Armagh, Waterford City and East Tyrone - in by-elections. With the Irish Convention – boycotted by Sinn Féin – about to present its report on proposals for implementing self-government for Ireland, there was a possibility that Sinn Féin support might be receding.

At this point the British government made what is now generally regarded as a catastrophic misjudgement. With losses mounting on the Western Front, Prime Minister David Lloyd George decided to tie proposals for self-government to the extension of conscription to Ireland. The backlash among the Nationalist population was strong. On the day of Young's death, an Anti-Conscription Committee was formed in Dublin, which included Griffith and John Dillon, newly elected leader of the IPP. The next day Sinn Féin took the seat of Tullamore in an uncontested by-election, the IPP candidate having withdrawn in the interest of national unity. On 23 April, a one-day general strike brought the country to a halt.

== Campaign ==
A political cartoon showing Arthur Griffith (left) and John Dillon (right)

Dillon now called for Griffith to stand aside in favour of a neutral candidate, Mayor of Dublin Laurence O'Neill, and described his refusal to do so as 'wanton provocation'. Griffith, unpopular with the IPP because of his many years of criticisms of what he saw as their excessive moderation, was attacked in the pages of the Freeman's Journal, which supported the Party. "No other choice could have been calculated to add bitterness to the contest", Dillon later commented. Catholic Church leaders supported Dillon's proposal, but without success. John O'Hanlon, a member of Cavan Urban District Council, was nominated as candidate of the IPP.

Griffith began the campaign energetically, visiting the constituency five times in just over three weeks. The situation took a new turn on 17 May, when the Viceroy, Lord French, ordered the arrest of a number of Sinn Féin leaders, including Griffiths, citing an alleged 'German Plot'. This brought about a wave of sympathy from the public, and it was now Dillon's turn to face demands for his candidate to withdraw. He refused, saying it "would be taken as a sign of weakness of the Irish Parliamentary Party were they to withdraw their candidate". Griffith won the support of others including the Irish Parliamentary Party's MPs for North Meath, Patrick White and Cork City, William O'Brien.

The campaign also focused on economic issues, with the IPP supporters arguing that they had achieved increases in the price of flour, and Sinn Féin claiming responsibility for a rise in old age pensions. At one meeting, there were reports of mud and eggs being thrown at speakers supporting O'Hanlon.

Griffith's fellow vice-president in Sinn Féin, Fr. Michael O'Flanagan, defying his Bishop's censure, came to Cavan and gave a speech at Ballyjamesduff on Sunday 26 May. This oration became known as 'Father O'Flanagan's Suppressed Speech' and was quickly proscribed by the censor. Sinn Féin printed and published the speech.

Reports shortly before the voting suggested it would be close-run: "Both sides express confidence in the result", The Times reported, "but it is generally admitted that the Nationalist candidate has improved his chances very considerably in the past fortnight".

== Result ==
When the votes were counted, Griffith was elected with 3,785 votes as against 2,581 for O'Hanlon. In keeping with his party's abstentionist policy, Griffith refused to take his seat at Westminster. He was re-elected for the seat in the general election of 1918. It seems clear that the threat of conscription (which was never, in fact, imposed) was a major factor in Sinn Féin's victory, along with the 'German Plot' arrests. Without them, Dillon argued, his party would have won a decisive majority. Michael Laffan writes that the victory "enabled Sinn Féin to regain its momentum of 1917 and to recover from its setbacks in the three recent campaigns".

By-election 1918: East Cavan
Party	Candidate	Votes	%	±%
Sinn Féin	Arthur Griffith	3,795	59.5	New
Irish Parliamentary	John O'Hanlon	2,581	40.5	N/A
Majority		1,214	19.0	N/A
Turnout		6,376	72.3	N/A
Sinn Féin gain from Irish Parliamentary		Swing	N/A	
