= Blackwatertown =

Village in County Armagh, Northern Ireland

Coordinates: 54.413°N 6.700°W

Blackwatertown: Irish: An Port Mór
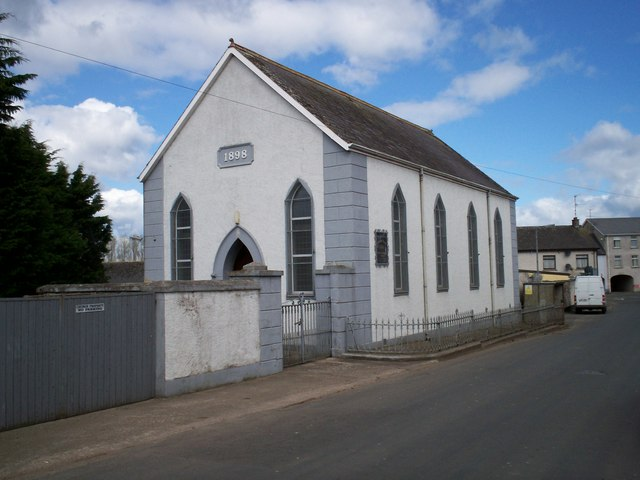
- Blackwatertown Road, with the Methodist Church

- Location within Northern Ireland
- Population: 371 (2021 census)
- District: Armagh, Banbridge and Craigavon
- County: County Armagh
- Country: Northern Ireland
- Sovereign state: United Kingdom
- Post town: DUNGANNON
- Postcode district: BT71
- Dialling code: 028

Blackwatertown (Irish: An Port Mór) is a small village in the north-west of County Armagh in Northern Ireland. It sits on the River Blackwater, in the townland of Lisbofin, at the border with County Tyrone. The village is around 5 miles (8 km) north of Armagh city, and the villages of Benburb and Moy are nearby. Blackwatertown had a population of 371 in the 2021 census. The River Blackwater enters Lough Neagh west of Derrywarragh Island and is navigable from Maghery to Blackwatertown.

== History ==
In 1575, during the Tudor conquest of Ireland, the English built a fort at what is now Blackwatertown, to control this important river crossing in the heart of Gaelic Ulster. Most of the fort was on the eastern bank of the river, and there was a stone tower on the western bank. In February 1595, at the outset of the Nine Years' War, a Gaelic force led by Art MacBaron O'Neill assaulted and captured the fort from the English.

This fort is referenced in the village's Irish name, An Port Mór ("the great fort"). The wider townland is also called Lisbofin, from Lios Bó Finne meaning "fort of the white cow", which may refer to one of the ringforts in the area.

Blackwatertown was one of the first places in Northern Ireland to erect street signs in the Irish language in 1980. The village recently had signs erected at the entrances indicating its name; previously signs were erected by local individuals indicating its name in Irish.

== Education ==
Blackwatertown had three schools: Blackwatertown Boys' Primary School and Blackwatertown Girls' Primary School, both of which were managed by the Council for Catholic Maintained Schools (CCMS); and Blackwatertown Primary School, managed by Blackwatertown Methodist Church and attended by pupils of several denominations. As the non-Roman Catholic population dwindled, Blackwatertown Primary School ceased to be viable and closed. The two Catholic schools amalgamated and formed a new school known as St Jarlath's Primary School.

== Sport ==
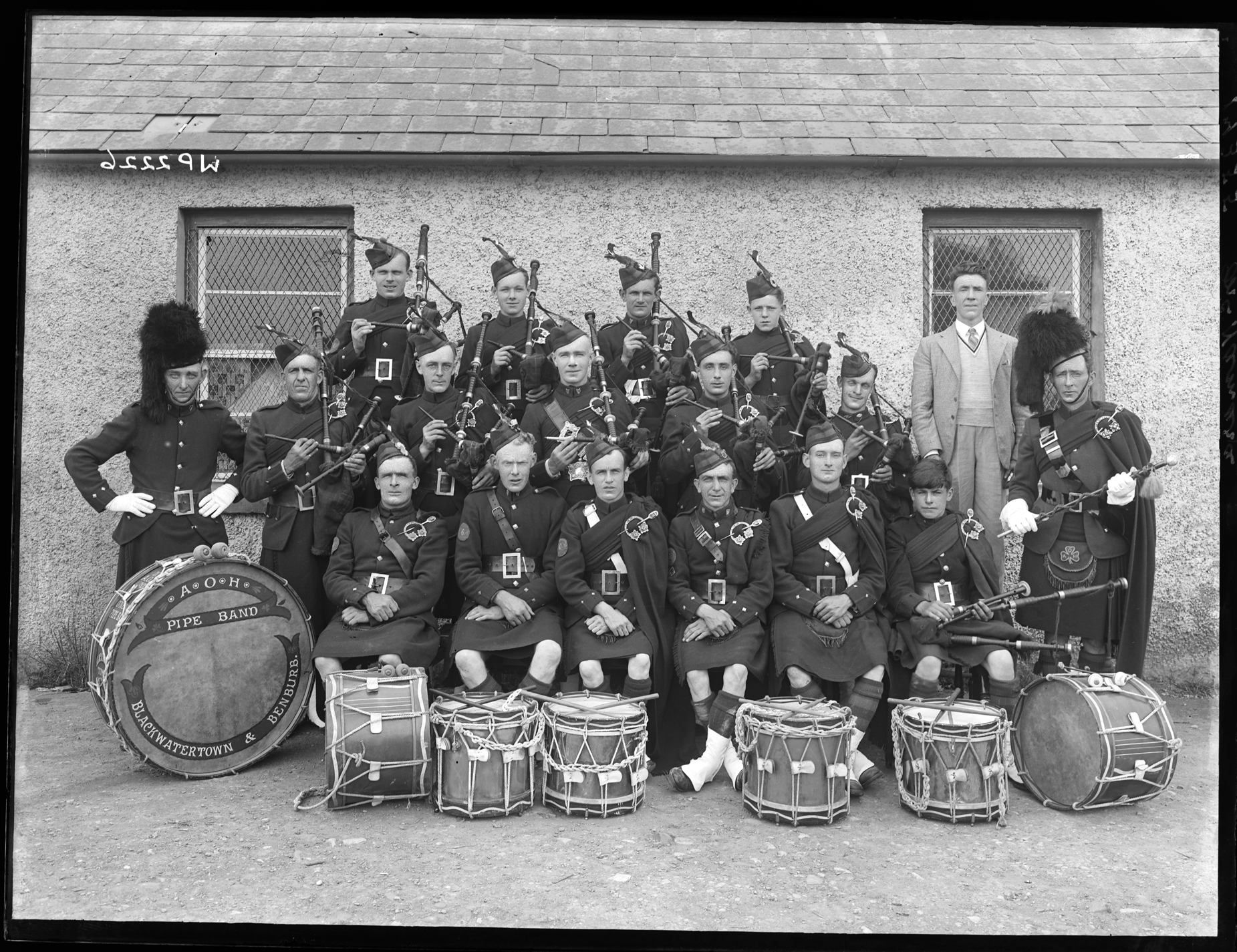
The Blackwatertown and Benburb Ancient Order of Hibernians Pipe Band, circa 1930

The local GAA club, Port Mór, plays at Junior level in county competitions.

The local boxing club is St Jarlath's ABC.

The ancient sport of road bowling, known as 'bullets', is still played along country roads. Two players throw a small metal ball (bullet) a set distance on a road; the winner is the player who finishes in the fewest throws. This sport is very popular in most parts of County Armagh and in parts of County Cork.

== In popular culture ==
A fictional 1950s version of Blackwatertown is the setting for the crime thriller Blackwatertown by Paul Waters, published in 2020 by Unbound in paperback and ebook and by W.F. Howes, now RBMedia, in audiobook.

== Notable people ==
- General Sir William Olpherts (1822–1902), British Indian Army officer and recipient of the Victoria Cross
- John Campbell (born 1865), Member of Parliament (MP) for South Armagh 1900–1906

== See also ==
- List of towns and villages in Northern Ireland
