= Charles O'Neill (Irish nationalist politician) =

Irish nationalist politician (1849–1918)

Member of Parliament for South Armagh
- In office 5 November 1909 – 14 January 1918
- Preceded by: William McKillop
- Succeeded by: Patrick Donnelly

Personal details
- Born: 1849 County Armagh, Ireland
- Died: 14 January 1918 (aged 68–69)
- Party: Irish Parliamentary Party

Charles O'Neill (1849 – 14 January 1918) was an Irish nationalist politician and Member of Parliament (MP) in the House of Commons of the United Kingdom.

He was first stood for election as the Irish Parliamentary Party (IPP) candidate for the South Armagh constituency at the 1900 general election, but was defeated by the Healyite Nationalist MP John Campbell. After the death of the incumbent IPP MP William McKillop, O'Neill was elected at November 1909 South Armagh by-election.

He was re-elected at the January 1910 and December 1910 general elections. He died in office on 14 January 1918, and the February 1918 South Armagh by-election was won by IPP candidate Patrick Donnelly.

Parliament of the United Kingdom
Preceded by William McKillop	Member of Parliament for South Armagh; 1909–1918	Succeeded by Patrick Donnelly
