= Patrick Donnelly (politician) =

Irish politician (1878–1947)

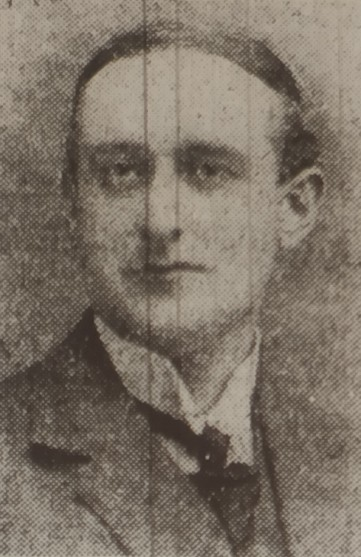
- Donnelly in 1918

Member of Parliament for South Armagh
- In office 1918–1922
- Preceded by: Charles O'Neill
- Succeeded by: Constituency abolished

Personal details
- Born: 20 July 1887 County Londonderry, Ireland
- Died: 13 August 1947 (aged 60) Windsor Hill, Newry, Northern Ireland
- Party: Irish Parliamentary Party
- Spouse: Susanna Rogers
- Education: Queen's College Belfast

Patrick Donnelly (20 July 1878 – 13 August 1947) was an Irish solicitor and nationalist politician and MP in the House of Commons of the United Kingdom of Great Britain and Ireland.

== Early life ==
A native of Draperstown, County Londonderry, Donnelly was born on 20 July 1878, the son of Patrick Donnelly, a spirit merchant and farmer, and his wife, Sarah Convery. He was educated privately and at Queen's College Belfast. He served his solicitor's apprenticeship with Michael McCartan, the MP for South Down. He qualified in 1905.

Donnelly was living in Camlough at the time of the 1901 census. In 1909 in Belfast, he married Susanna Rogers, of Draperstown.

== Politics ==
Donnelly was first elected as member of the Irish Parliamentary Party at the by-election of 2 February 1918, and re-elected in the 1918 UK general election, representing the South Armagh constituency. It was one of the six seats won by the IPP at the election, when he defeated the Sinn Féin candidate, after which he served as a member of the Nationalist Party of Northern Ireland until 1922.

He unsuccessfully contested the 1929 Northern Ireland general election for South Armagh as an Independent Nationalist, coming second with 46.3 percent of the vote.

According to an obituary, he was the second last of the surviving MPs who had voted against the Treaty of Versailles. He died at his residence at Windsor Hill, Newry.

Parliament of the United Kingdom
Preceded by Charles O'Neill	Member of Parliament for South Armagh; 1918–1922	Constituency abolished
