= Laurence Ginnell =

Irish nationalist politician and writer (1852–1923)

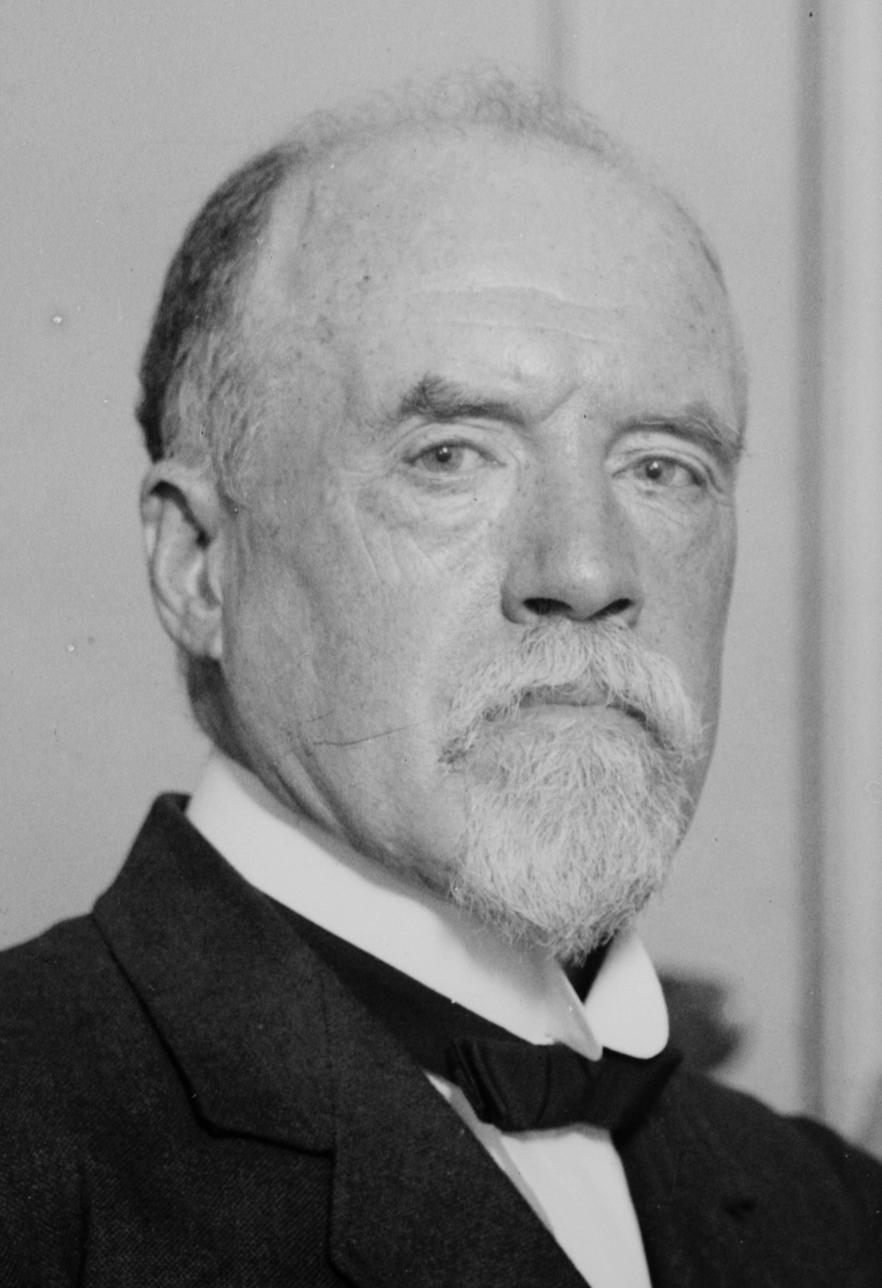
- Ginnell, c.1915–1920

Teachta Dála
- In office May 1921 – 17 April 1923
- Constituency: Longford–Westmeath
- In office December 1918 – May 1921
- Constituency: County Westmeath

Member of Parliament
- In office February 1906 – December 1918
- Constituency: Westmeath North

Personal details
- Born: 9 April 1852 (baptised) Delvin, County Westmeath, Ireland
- Died: 17 April 1923 (aged 71) Washington, D.C., USA
- Party: Sinn Féin; Irish Parliamentary Party
- Spouses: Margaret Wolfe (1882–1883, widowed); Alice King (m. 1902)
- Occupation: Barrister; Author

Laurence Ginnell (baptised 9 April 1852 – 17 April 1923) was an Irish nationalist politician, lawyer and Member of Parliament (MP) of the House of Commons of the United Kingdom of Great Britain and Ireland as member of the Irish Parliamentary Party for North Westmeath at the 1906 UK general election. From 1910 he sat as an Independent Nationalist and at the 1918 general election he was elected for Sinn Féin.

== Early life ==
Ginnell was born in Delvin, County Westmeath, in 1852, the son of Laurence Ginnell and Mary Monaghan and twin to Michael Ginnell. He was self-educated and was called to the Irish bar as well as the Bar of England and Wales. In his youth, he was involved with the Land War and acted as private secretary to John Dillon.

The last great social and agrarian campaign of the home rule movement, the Ranch War (1906 and 1909), was largely led and organised by Ginnell from the central office of the United Irish League. Ginnell was elected an MP in 1906, took his seat at Westminster and swore allegiance to Edward VII. On 14 October 1906, he launched the "war" at Downs, County Westmeath:

The purpose of the war was to bring relief to the large numbers of landless and smallholders, particularly in the West, who were relatively untouched by the Wyndham Land Purchase Act (1903) and by the larger policy of purchase. The strategy that Ginnell pursued was the Down's Policy, or cattle driving, a proceeding designed to harass the prosperous grazier interests, whose 'ranches' occupied large, under populated and under worked tracts. The 'Down's Policy' was also meant to draw public attention to the scandalous inequalities that survived in the Irish countryside. The conservatives within the Home rule leadership were understandably suspicious about the revival of agrarian disturbances, but the mood of the party organisation was hardening in the aftermath of a disappointing devolution bill in May 1907, from the new Liberal government, so that it seemed logical to turn to the traditional mechanism for reactivating the national question: agrarian agitation.

Ginnell's cattle drives began to tail off after the summer of 1908, and the agitation was finally dissolved with the passage of a 1909 Act by the Liberal Chief Secretary Augustine Birrell that allowed the transfer to the Land Commission of farmland by compulsory purchase, which was hailed by the national movement as an historic victory. In reality, the Ranch War involved an implosion within sectors of the Irish Party, as its leadership had not facilitated the working of the Wyndham Land Purchase Act in the first place because John Dillon and his like wanted conflict above victory.

In 1909, Ginnell was expelled from the Irish Parliamentary Party (IPP) for the offence of asking to see the party accounts after which he sat as an Independent Nationalist. During that time, he was addressed frequently as "The MP for Ireland". At Westminster, he was highly critical of the British government's war policy and its holding of executions of certain participants in the Easter Rising of 1916. On 9 May, he accused British Prime Minister H. H. Asquith, of "Murder" and was forcibly ejected from the Chamber. He visited many of the prisoners who were interned in various prisons in Wales and England.

== Sinn Féin ==
In 1917, he campaigned to try to ensure the election of Count Plunkett in the North Roscommon by-election in which he defeated the IPP candidate on an abstentionist platform. Following the victory of Éamon de Valera in East Clare, while he was standing for Sinn Féin, on 10 July 1917, Ginnell joined Sinn Féin.

At the Sinn Féin Ard Fheis that year, at which the party was reconstituted as a republican party with de Valera as president, Ginnell and W. T. Cosgrave were elected Honorary Treasurers. He was imprisoned in March 1918 for encouraging land agitation and later deported to Reading Gaol. In the 1918 general election, he was elected as a Sinn Féin MP for the County Westmeath constituency, comfortably defeating his IPP challenger. After his release from prison, he attended the proceedings of the First Dáil. Along with fellow TD James O'Mara, he was one of the only TDs to serve as a member in both the House of Commons and Dáil Éireann.

He was one of the few people to have served in the House of Commons and in the Oireachtas. He was appointed Director of Propaganda in the Second Ministry of the Irish Republic. After spending a year as a republican campaigner in Chicago, he was appointed the Representative of the Irish Republic in Argentina and South America by de Valera. He carried out his propaganda work here to distribute copies of the Irish Bulletin and to provide the Sinn Féin version of the conflict during the War of Independence. On 16 August 1921 he returned home to attend the first meeting of the Second Dáil. He travelled back to Argentina some months later to serve as the Representative of the Republic there.

== Anti-Treaty opinion ==
He opposed the Anglo-Irish Treaty that was ratified by the Dáil in January 1922, and was elected as an anti-Treaty Sinn Féin TD at the 1922 general election on the eve of the Irish Civil War.

On 9 September 1922, Ginnell was the only anti-Treaty TD to attend the inaugural meeting of the Provisional Parliament or 3rd Dáil. Before signing the roll, Ginnell said:

"I want some explanation before I sign. I have been elected in pursuance of a decree by Dáil Éireann, which decree embodies the decree of 20 May 1922. I have heard nothing read in reference to that decree, nothing but an Act of a foreign Parliament. I have been elected as a member of Dáil Éireann. I have not been elected to attend any such Parliament. Will anyone tell me with authority whether it is...".

He was at that point interrupted but resumed by saying that he would sign the roll and take his seat in the Assembly if the Assembly were Dáil Éireann. He was informed he was not allowed raise any such question until a Ceann Comhairle had been elected. He continued to ask questions regardless to which he got no answer including his question: "Will any member of the Six Counties be allowed to sit in this Dáil?" W. T. Cosgrave moved at this point that he be excluded from the House. Ginnell protested, and he was dragged out by force.

De Valera later appointed him a member of his "Council of State", a twelve-member body set up to advise him on the deteriorating situation in the civil war. Ginnell returned to the United States soon afterwards to serve as the Republic's envoy in the country. He ordered Robert Briscoe and some of his friends to take possession of the Consular Offices in Nassau Street, New York City, then in the hands of the Free State Government, to obtain the list of the subscribers to the bond drive organized to aid the struggle in the War of Independence. At the time, a court case was ongoing to decide on who had the right to the funds: the newly installed Provisional Government or de Valera, as one of the three trustees among the anti-Treatyites. Ginnell died in the United States on 17 April 1923, aged 71, still campaigning against the Anglo-Irish Treaty.

== Sources ==
- Briscoe, Robert (1958) For the Life of Me.
- Gallagher, Frank (2005 edition) The Four Glorious Years.
- Ginnell, Laurence (1993) The Brehon Laws: A Legal Handbook, ISBN 978-0-8377-2213-9
- Ginnell, Laurence (1919?) The Irish Republic. Why? Official statement prepared for submission to the Peace Conference
- Laurence Ginnell – 'The Member for Ireland'.
- Jackson, Alvin (2003). Home Rule: An Irish History 1800–2000, Fall and Rise 1892–1910. Phoenix Press. pp. 110–13. ISBN 0-7538-1767-5.
- Macardle, Dorothy (1937) The Irish Republic.

Parliament of the United Kingdom
Preceded by Patrick Kennedy	Member of Parliament for North Westmeath; 1906–1918	Constituency abolished
New constituency	Member of Parliament for County Westmeath; 1918–1922	Constituency abolished
Oireachtas
New constituency	Teachta Dála for County Westmeath; 1918–1921	Constituency abolished

Dáil	Election	Deputy (Party)	Deputy (Party)	Deputy (Party)	Deputy (Party)	Deputy (Party)
2nd	1921	Lorcan Robbins (SF)	Seán Mac Eoin (SF)	Joseph McGuinness (SF)	Laurence Ginnell (SF)	4 seats 1921–1923
3rd	1922	John Lyons (Lab)	Seán Mac Eoin (PT-SF)	Francis McGuinness (PT-SF)	Laurence Ginnell (AT-SF)	4 seats 1921–1923
4th	1923	John Lyons (Ind.)	Conor Byrne (Rep)	James Killane (Rep)	Patrick Shaw (CnaG)	Patrick McKenna (FP)
5th	1927 (Jun)	Henry Broderick (Lab)	Michael Kennedy (FF)	James Victory (FF)	Patrick Shaw (CnaG)	Hugh Garahan (FP)
6th	1927 (Sep)	Henry Broderick (Lab)	Michael Kennedy (FF)	James Killane (FF)	Patrick Shaw (CnaG)	Michael Connolly (CnaG)
6th	1930 by-election	Henry Broderick (Lab)	Michael Kennedy (FF)	James Geoghegan (FF)	Patrick Shaw (CnaG)	Michael Connolly (CnaG)
7th	1932	Francis Gormley (FF)	Michael Kennedy (FF)	James Geoghegan (FF)	Patrick Shaw (CnaG)	Seán Mac Eoin (CnaG)
8th	1933	James Victory (FF)	Michael Kennedy (FF)	James Geoghegan (FF)	Charles Fagan (NCP)	Seán Mac Eoin (CnaG)
9th	1937	Constituency abolished. See Athlone–Longford and Meath–Westmeath				

Dáil	Election	Deputy (Party)	Deputy (Party)	Deputy (Party)	Deputy (Party)	Deputy (Party)
13th	1948	Erskine H. Childers (FF)	Thomas Carter (FF)	Michael Kennedy (FF)	Seán Mac Eoin (FG)	Charles Fagan (Ind.)
14th	1951	Erskine H. Childers (FF)	Frank Carter (FF)	Michael Kennedy (FF)	Seán Mac Eoin (FG)	Charles Fagan (Ind.)
15th	1954	Erskine H. Childers (FF)	Frank Carter (FF)	Michael Kennedy (FF)	Seán Mac Eoin (FG)	Charles Fagan (FG)
16th	1957	Erskine H. Childers (FF)	Ruairí Ó Brádaigh (SF)	Michael Kennedy (FF)	Seán Mac Eoin (FG)	Charles Fagan (FG)
17th	1961	Frank Carter (FF)	Joe Sheridan (Ind.)	Michael Kennedy (FF)	Seán Mac Eoin (FG)	4 seats 1961–1992
18th	1965	Frank Carter (FF)	Joe Sheridan (Ind.)	Patrick Lenihan (FF)	Gerry L'Estrange (FG)	4 seats 1961–1992
19th	1969	Frank Carter (FF)	Joe Sheridan (Ind.)	Patrick Lenihan (FF)	Gerry L'Estrange (FG)	4 seats 1961–1992
19th	1970 by-election	Frank Carter (FF)	Joe Sheridan (Ind.)	Patrick Cooney (FG)	Gerry L'Estrange (FG)	4 seats 1961–1992
20th	1973	Frank Carter (FF)	Joe Sheridan (Ind.)	Patrick Cooney (FG)	Gerry L'Estrange (FG)	4 seats 1961–1992
21st	1977	Albert Reynolds (FF)	Joe Sheridan (Ind.)	Seán Keegan (FF)	Gerry L'Estrange (FG)	4 seats 1961–1992
22nd	1981	Albert Reynolds (FF)	Patrick Cooney (FG)	Seán Keegan (FF)	Gerry L'Estrange (FG)	4 seats 1961–1992
23rd	1982 (Feb)	Albert Reynolds (FF)	Patrick Cooney (FG)	Seán Keegan (FF)	Gerry L'Estrange (FG)	4 seats 1961–1992
24th	1982 (Nov)	Albert Reynolds (FF)	Patrick Cooney (FG)	Mary O'Rourke (FF)	Gerry L'Estrange (FG)	4 seats 1961–1992
25th	1987	Albert Reynolds (FF)	Patrick Cooney (FG)	Mary O'Rourke (FF)	Henry Abbott (FF)	4 seats 1961–1992
26th	1989	Albert Reynolds (FF)	Louis Belton (FG)	Mary O'Rourke (FF)	Paul McGrath (FG)	4 seats 1961–1992
27th	1992	Constituency abolished. See Longford–Roscommon and Westmeath				

Dáil	Election	Deputy (Party)	Deputy (Party)	Deputy (Party)	Deputy (Party)	Deputy (Party)
30th	2007	Willie Penrose (Lab)	Peter Kelly (FF)	Mary O'Rourke (FF)	James Bannon (FG)	4 seats 2007–2024
31st	2011	Willie Penrose (Lab)	Robert Troy (FF)	Nicky McFadden (FG)	James Bannon (FG)	4 seats 2007–2024
31st	2014 by-election	Willie Penrose (Lab)	Robert Troy (FF)	Gabrielle McFadden (FG)	James Bannon (FG)	4 seats 2007–2024
32nd	2016	Willie Penrose (Lab)	Robert Troy (FF)	Kevin "Boxer" Moran (Ind.)	Peter Burke (FG)	4 seats 2007–2024
33rd	2020	Sorca Clarke (SF)	Robert Troy (FF)	Joe Flaherty (FF)	Peter Burke (FG)	4 seats 2007–2024
34th	2024	Sorca Clarke (SF)	Robert Troy (FF)	Kevin "Boxer" Moran (Ind.)	Peter Burke (FG)	Micheál Carrigy (FG)
