= Thomas O'Hanlon =

British politician (1837–1897)

Thomas O'Hanlon (c. 1837 – 7 May 1897) was an Irish Nationalist politician who served as Member of Parliament (MP) for East Cavan from 1885 to 1892.

He was a native of Newry and became a wholesale and retail grocer in Derry. He was a member of the Board of Poor Law Guardians in Newry and a member of the Town Council in Derry.

He was elected unopposed as Nationalist MP for East Cavan at the 1885 general election and returned unopposed for the same seat in 1886. When the Irish Parliamentary Party split in December 1890 over the leadership of Charles Stewart Parnell, O'Hanlon supported Parnell. However he did not seek re-election in the general election of 1892. He later stood as a candidate for Dublin Corporation in the Rotunda ward on 24 December 1895, but failed by 85 votes to win the seat.

He died of acute pneumonia at his home in North Frederick Street, Dublin, on 7 May 1897, having been attended in the earlier stages of his illness by his former Parnellite Parliamentary colleague Dr J. E. Kenny. He was unmarried.

== Sources ==
- Irish Times, 26 December 1895 and 8 May 1897
- The Times (London), 30 June 1886
- Brian M. Walker (ed.), Parliamentary Election Results in Ireland, 1801-1922, Dublin, Royal Irish Academy, 1978

Parliament of the United Kingdom
New constituency	Member of Parliament for East Cavan; 1885 – 1892	Succeeded by Samuel Young
