= John Sweetman =

Irish politician (1844–1936)

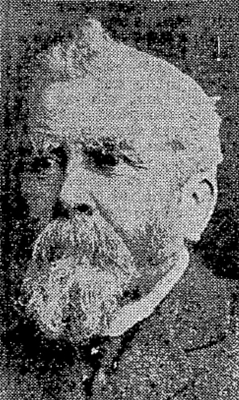

President of Sinn Féin
- In office 1908–1911
- Preceded by: Edward Martyn
- Succeeded by: Arthur Griffith

Vice President of Sinn Féin
- In office 1905–1907
- Preceded by: New Office
- Succeeded by: Bulmer Hobson

Member of Parliament for East Wicklow
- In office July 1892 – 8 April 1895
- Preceded by: William Joseph Corbet
- Succeeded by: Edward Peter O'Kelly

Personal details
- Born: 9 August 1844 County Dublin, Ireland
- Died: 8 September 1936 (aged 92) Dublin, Ireland
- Party: Irish National Federation; Sinn Féin

John Sweetman (9 August 1844 – 8 September 1936) was an Irish nationalist politician who served as an Anti-Parnellite Irish National Federation Member of Parliament (MP) in the 1890s, but later radicalised. He was one of the founders of Sinn Féin and was the party's president from 1908 to 1911.

== Early life ==
He was the eldest son of John Sweetman (1805–1859), a Dublin brewer, and Honoria (1804–1879), daughter of Malachy O'Connor (a Dublin merchant).

He was born in County Dublin and educated at Downside School in Somerset. He lived at Drumbaragh, Kells, County Meath. He married Agnes Hanly in Navan, County Meath on 11 September 1895. They had six children, four sons and two daughters.

== Political career ==
In 1879, he was prominent enough in Irish nationalist circles to be a committee member and propose the election of Charles Stewart Parnell as president of the Irish Land League.

In 1880, he visited Minnesota and became involved with Bishop Ireland's scheme to settle poor Irish people in the State, recently vacated by the Eastern Dakota. On 27 December 1881, The Times published an article from 'a correspondent' (who may have been Sweetman himself) about 'An Irish Colony. Currie, Murray County, Minnesota'. The article explained that John Sweetman was the managing director of the Irish-American Colonization Company, "the principal organizer and practical director of the emigration...in order to make the most profitable selection of lands Mr Sweetman travelled through and carefully examined the States of Dakota and Minnesota, and also Manitoba, and finally purchased some 20,000 acres (80 km²) of prairie land situated in Murray County ...". The project was not a complete success but did help a number of people to obtain a better life in America.

The Sweetman brewery in Dublin was purchased by Casey's Drogheda Brewery Ltd in 1890.

He was a major investor in the National Press newspaper. The Times of 3 June 1892 mentioned that "Mr John Sweetman of County Meath, who had contributed £1,000 as a donation to the fund for starting the National Press, had been unanimously selected for the Eastern Division". This was at a convention to select Nationalist candidates for the two Parliamentary constituencies in County Wicklow.

He was elected at the 1892 general election as MP for East Wicklow as a member of the Anti-Parnellite Irish National Federation faction of the Irish Parliamentary Party. He became a Parnellite in 1895 and resigned the seat on 8 April 1895. At the resulting by-election 26 April 1895, he stood as a Parnellite candidate but was defeated in a closely fought three-way contest. At the general election in July 1895 he stood in North Meath, where he narrowly failed to unseat the sitting anti-Parnellite MP James Gibney.

== Radicalisation ==
By the early 20th century he had become far more radical. In 1905, speaking at the annual conference of the Catholic Truth Society of Ireland, in response to a paper suggesting the replanting of the waste lands of Ireland as a remedy to emigration, he displayed considerable hostility to the "English" government. The Times reported that he said "it was not for that society to call upon its greatest enemy, the English government, to plant forests. The English government hated the Irish nation as that of Egypt hated the Jewish nation, and they must fight the Government with all the weapons that God had given them, just as Moses had fought the Egyptians. Unfortunately, they had not the power to call down the ten plagues of Egypt upon the English Government, but they could boycott England's manufactures and her Navy and Army".

In 1900, Sweetman denounced Queen Victoria's visit to Ireland, attacked Edward VII for taking the Oath of Coronation oath, and opposed the votes of congratulation to the king passed by public bodies in Ireland at the time of the coronation.

By 1903, Sweetman was a leading member of Meath County Council. In recognition for becoming chairman of the council, Sweetman was offered an honour to be granted by Edward VII, however, Sweetman declared that his possession of Wolfe Tone's notebook was a greater honour than any the king could bestow and organised a campaign against the king's visit to Ireland.

== Sinn Féin ==
He was one of the founders of Sinn Féin in 1905. He became the party's second president in 1908, succeeding Edward Martyn, and retained the presidency until 1911 when he stepped down, to be succeeded by Arthur Griffith.

=== Sweetman's ideology ===
During this time period, Sweetman was considered to be on the political right within Sinn Féin. Sweetman practised a form of "clericalist catholicism" and was socially conservative, a stance that lead him to reject any idea of class politics (whether forwarded by Land Lords or Socialists), and to declare in his writing that the only way by which Ireland could be a prosperous nation was if the political class in Ireland cultivated a "national feeling" of unity that brought people of all backgrounds together into a joined social contract. Sweetman's views were often criticised by leftist, liberal, and republican members of the Sinn Féin movement for moving Arthur Griffin to the political right, and for stifling criticism of the clergy in Sinn Féin publications.

Sweetman opposed Women's suffrage, and was criticised for creating a scholarship for University College Dublin that had a set condition that women must be excluded from it. Sweetman opposed Jim Larkin and the Irish Transport and General Workers' Union during the Dublin lockout of 1913, voicing his views in a pamphlet entitled "The industrial problem".

== During the Revolutionary Period ==
Precipitating the Conscription Crisis of 1918, in 1915 Sweetman stood against conscription in Ireland. He declared that World War I had begun when Britain attacked Germany to grab German trade, that Ireland would be ruined by wartime taxation unless it cut ties with Britain and that if he was arrested for ‘speaking the truth’ this would prove the falsity of John Redmond's claim that Ireland had regained her freedom.

He was briefly arrested and detained after the 1916 Easter Rising, as the British authorities rounded up anyone with connections to Sinn Féin in the mistaken belief that the Rising had been planned by Sinn Féin rather than the Irish Republican Brotherhood. Following his release, Sweetman worked with Herbert Moore Pim to begin rebuilding Sinn Féin.

Sweetman turned down a Sinn Féin nomination for the 1918 general election on the grounds that he was too old; instead, his cousin Roger Sweetman was Teachta Dála (TD) for North Wexford from 1918 to 1921.

Sweetman supported the Pro-Treaty side in the Civil War period but later denounced the government of W. T. Cosgrave for its abandonment of Griffith's protectionist economic policies and supported Fianna Fáil after 1927. Throughout his life he wrote many letters to Irish newspapers, and in the late 1920s and early 1930s he was a contributor to The Leader edited by D. P. Moran.

Sweetman was fiercely opposed to the Blueshirts (of which his other cousin Gerard Sweetman was an enthusiastic member), comparing Eoin O'Duffy to Hitler. He also opposed plans to build a Catholic Cathedral in Merrion Square, where he himself lived, on the grounds that this would cause great trouble and inconvenience to the residents.

He died in Dublin in 1936 aged 92.

== Sources ==
- Who's Who of British Members of Parliament: Vol. II 1886-1918, edited by M. Stenton and S. Lees (The Harvester Press 1978)
- The Times (of London), editions of 27 December 1881, 5 April 1889, 3 June 1892, 5 July 1892, 10 April 1895, 17 September 1895 and 13 October 1905 and 10 September 1936.

Parliament of the United Kingdom
Preceded by William Joseph Corbet	Member of Parliament for East Wicklow; 1892 – 1895	Succeeded by Edward Peter O'Kelly
Party political offices
Preceded by New position	Vice President of Sinn Féin; 1905–1907 with Arthur Griffith	Succeeded by Bulmer Hobson
Preceded by Edward Martyn	President of Sinn Féin; 1908–1911	Succeeded by Arthur Griffith
