= North Westmeath =

Former parliamentary constituency in the United Kingdom

- Former county constituency for the House of Commons

1885–1918
- Seats: 1
- Created from: County Westmeath
- Replaced by: County Westmeath

North Westmeath was a constituency in Ireland, returning one Member of Parliament to the United Kingdom House of Commons from 1885 to 1918.

Prior to the 1885 general election and after the dissolution of parliament in 1918 the area was part of the County Westmeath constituency.

== Boundaries ==
This constituency comprised the northern part of County Westmeath.

1885–1918: The baronies of Corkaree, Delvin, Farbill and Fore, those parts of the baronies of Moyashel and Magheradernon and Moyguish not contained in the constituency of South Westmeath, and that part of the barony of Fartullagh contained within the parishes of Lynn, Moylisker and Mullingar.

== Members of Parliament ==
Years	Member	Party
1885–1890	James Tuite	Irish Parliamentary Party
1891–1900	James Tuite	Irish National Federation
1900–1906	Patrick Kennedy	Healyite Nationalist^{1}
1906–1909	Laurence Ginnell	Irish Parliamentary Party
1909–1917	Laurence Ginnell	Independent Nationalist
1917–1918	Laurence Ginnell	Sinn Féin

^{1}Joined the Irish Parliamentary Party during the parliamentary term

== Elections ==
=== Elections in the 1880s ===
1885 general election: North Westmeath
Party	Candidate	Votes	%	±%
Irish Parliamentary	James Tuite	3,648	93.5	
Liberal	John Wilson	255	6.5	
Majority		3,393	87.0	
Turnout		3,903	70.9	
Registered electors		5,507		
Irish Parliamentary win (new seat)				

1886 general election: North Westmeath
Party	Candidate	Votes	%	±%
Irish Parliamentary	James Tuite	Unopposed		
Registered electors		5,507		
Irish Parliamentary hold				

=== Elections in the 1890s ===
1892 general election: North Westmeath
Party	Candidate	Votes	%	±%
Irish National Federation	James Tuite	2,878	88.4	N/A
Irish National League	Alexander Blane	379	11.6	N/A
Majority		2,499	76.8	N/A
Turnout		3,257	60.9	N/A
Registered electors		5,347		
Irish National Federation gain from Irish Parliamentary		Swing	N/A	

1895 general election: North Westmeath
Party	Candidate	Votes	%	±%
Irish National Federation	James Tuite	Unopposed		
Registered electors		5,270		
Irish National Federation hold				

=== Elections in the 1900s ===
1900 general election: North Westmeath
Party	Candidate	Votes	%	±%
Healyite Nationalist	Patrick Kennedy	1,763	55.4	N/A
Irish Parliamentary	Laurence Ginnell	1,418	44.6	N/A
Majority		345	10.8	N/A
Turnout		3,181	51.3	N/A
Registered electors		6,200		
Healyite Nationalist gain from Irish National Federation		Swing	N/A	

1906 general election: North Westmeath
Party	Candidate	Votes	%	±%
Irish Parliamentary	Laurence Ginnell	Unopposed		
Registered electors		5,297		
Irish Parliamentary gain from Healyite Nationalist				

=== Elections in the 1910s ===
January 1910 general election: North Westmeath
Party	Candidate	Votes	%	±%
Ind. Nationalist	Laurence Ginnell	1,996	59.1	N/A
Irish Parliamentary	Patrick McKenna	1,379	40.9	N/A
Majority		617	18.2	N/A
Turnout		3,375	64.3	N/A
Registered electors		5,245		
Ind. Nationalist gain from Irish Parliamentary		Swing	N/A	

December 1910 general election: North Westmeath
Party	Candidate	Votes	%	±%
Ind. Nationalist	Laurence Ginnell	Unopposed		
Registered electors		5,245		
Ind. Nationalist hold				
