= North Meath =

UK House of Commons constituency (1885 to 1922)

- Former county constituency for the House of Commons

1885–1922
- Seats: 1
- Created from: County Meath
- Replaced by: Louth–Meath

North Meath was a UK Parliament constituency in Ireland, returning one Member of Parliament (MP) from 1885 to 1922.

Prior to the 1885 United Kingdom general election the area was part of the County Meath constituency. From 1922, on the establishment of the Irish Free State, it was not represented in the UK Parliament.

== Boundaries ==
This constituency comprised the northern part of County Meath.

1885–1922: The baronies of Fore, Kells Lower, Kells Upper, Morgallion, Slane Lower and Slane Upper, that part of the barony of Navan Lower not contained within the constituency of South Meath, and that part of the barony of Skreen contained within the parishes of Ardmulchan and Athlumney.

== Members of Parliament ==
Years	Member	Party
1885–1886	Kevin Izod O'Doherty	Irish Parliamentary Party
1886–1890	Pierce Mahony	Irish Parliamentary Party
1891–1892	Pierce Mahony	Parnellite
1892	Michael Davitt	Irish National Federation
1893–1900	James Gibney	Irish National Federation
1900–1918	Patrick White	Irish Parliamentary Party
1918	Liam Mellows	Sinn Féin
1918–1922	vacant	

== Elections ==
=== Elections in the 1880s ===
1885 general election: North Meath
Party	Candidate	Votes	%	±%
Irish Parliamentary	Kevin Izod O'Doherty	Unopposed		
Registered electors		6,652		
Irish Parliamentary win (new seat)				

1886 general election: North Meath
Party	Candidate	Votes	%	±%
Irish Parliamentary	Pierce Mahony	Unopposed		
Registered electors		6,652		
Irish Parliamentary hold				

=== Elections in the 1890s ===
1892 general election: North Meath
Party	Candidate	Votes	%	±%
Irish National Federation	Michael Davitt	2,549	54.3	N/A
Irish National League	Pierce Mahony	2,146	45.7	N/A
Majority		403	8.6	N/A
Turnout		4,695	78.4	N/A
Registered electors		5,990		
Irish National Federation gain from Irish Parliamentary		Swing	N/A	

On petition, Davitt was unseated causing a by-election.

By-election, 1893: North Meath
Party	Candidate	Votes	%	±%
Irish National Federation	James Gibney	2,635	52.6	−1.7
Irish National League	Pierce Mahony	2,377	47.4	+1.7
Majority		258	5.2	−3.4
Turnout		5,012	82.7	+4.3
Registered electors		6,059		
Irish National Federation hold		Swing	−1.7	

1895 general election: North Meath
Party	Candidate	Votes	%	±%
Irish National Federation	James Gibney	2,324	50.3	−4.0
Irish National League	John Sweetman	2,292	49.7	+4.0
Majority		32	0.6	−8.0
Turnout		4,616	80.7	+2.3
Registered electors		5,721		
Irish National Federation hold		Swing	−4.0	

=== Elections in the 1900s ===
1900 general election: North Meath
Party	Candidate	Votes	%	±%
Irish Parliamentary	Patrick White	1,453	52.5	+2.2
Healyite Nationalist	James Gibney	1,316	47.5	−2.2
Majority		137	5.0	+4.4
Turnout		2,769	45.7	−35.0
Registered electors		6,064		
Irish Parliamentary hold		Swing		

1906 general election: North Meath
Party	Candidate	Votes	%	±%
Irish Parliamentary	Patrick White	Unopposed		
Registered electors		5,615		
Irish Parliamentary hold				

=== Elections in the 1910s ===
January 1910 general election: North Meath
Party	Candidate	Votes	%	±%
Irish Parliamentary	Patrick White	Unopposed		
Registered electors		5,662		
Irish Parliamentary hold				

December 1910 general election: North Meath
Party	Candidate	Votes	%	±%
Irish Parliamentary	Patrick White	Unopposed		
Registered electors		5,662		
Irish Parliamentary hold				

1918 general election: North Meath
Party	Candidate	Votes	%	±%
Sinn Féin	Liam Mellows	6,982	65.0	New
Irish Parliamentary	Patrick Joseph Cusack	3,758	35.0	N/A
Majority		3,224	30.0	N/A
Turnout		10,740	73.0	N/A
Registered electors		14,716		
Sinn Féin gain from Irish Parliamentary		Swing	N/A	

== Sources ==
- Walker, Brian M., ed. (1978). Parliamentary Election Results in Ireland, 1801–1922. Dublin: Royal Irish Academy. ISBN 0901714127.
- Leigh Rayment's Historical List of MPs – Constituencies beginning with "M" (part 2)
