= Alexander Blane =

Alexander Blane (c. 1850–7 February 1917) was an Irish nationalist politician and Member of Parliament (MP) for South Armagh, 1885–92. He was a supporter of Charles Stewart Parnell during the Split in the Irish Parliamentary Party, and later a pioneering Socialist. In 1876 he was appointed agent to the Catholic Registration Association, an organization dedicated to maximising the Catholic vote. He was also president of the Prisoners’ Aid Society.

== Early life ==
Blane was the son of Alexander (of County Armagh and of Sydney, Australia) and Bridget (of County Armagh) Slane. He was born about 1850 and was a native of the city of Armagh. Blane was educated by the Christian Brothers at Greenpark. He became a master tailor.

== Political career ==
In 1881 Blane was asked by the Land League at Armagh to stand for parliament for the county if there was an election, without result.

Tim Healy claimed in his 1928 memoirs to have helped nominate Blane as an Irish Parliamentary Party candidate in 1885:

"During the General Election, the late Alex Blane, a tailor, was returned for S. Armagh as a member of the Irish Party. At Parnell's urging I went to the Convention there, which was to choose the candidate. He wanted to keep out a man named Dempsey, although Dempsey had been his nominee for Co. Derry in 1882. Meanwhile, he was supposed to have become a Davittite. An anti-Davitt prejudice swayed the minds of James O'Kelly and T. P. O'Connor, who had become the inspirers of Parnell in such affairs. Their nominee was Ivor McGuinness, of Poyntz Pass. Objections were raised against him, and I avoided putting the issue as long as I could as the Armagh priests favoured Dempsey. For this the late Canon Quinn, P.P., described me as the "most tyrannical chairman he ever knew." His attack was just, but he knew nothing of my "sailing orders." Parnell's dislike of Dempsey had been fanned, on anti-Davitt grounds, and I dared not allow him to be accepted as a candidate, if a substitute could be found.

In my perplexity, after some hours' contention, I turned to Father McElvogue, C.C., and asked, "Have you no local man on whom you could unite?" He replied, "Did you see a chap on a ladder in his shirt-sleeves putting up the decorations as you came in? " "Yes", said I. "Well, that fellow is good at registration and election work. His name is Alex Blane. He is a tailor, and his father was a Protestant."

Subsequently, in November 1885 he was returned unopposed as Nationalist MP for South Armagh, and was again unopposed in 1886. He helped organise the Plan of Campaign, aimed at agricultural rent reductions, in Gweedore, Co. Donegal, together with the local priest, Father James McFadden, and the two of them were put on trial at Dunfanaghy in January 1888 as a result. Blane was sentenced under the Irish Coercion Act to four months imprisonment, increased on appeal in April 1888 to six months. The Chief Secretary for Ireland, Arthur Balfour, was challenged in the House of Commons when he said that the sentence had been reduced. He responded ‘The original sentence, I believe, was four months with hard labour, and the new sentence was 6 months, without hard labour, I believe, and I say that is not an increase of the sentence, but it is a matter of taste’. Blane's health suffered from his imprisonment and he was released three weeks early as a result.

In 1888 the Irish-American Catholic journalist WH Hurlbert investigated the situation in Gweedore in some detail.

== IPP split in 1890 ==
When the Irish Parliamentary Party split in December 1890 over the Parnell's leadership, Blane supported Parnell. At the general election of 1892, Blane stood as a Parnellite both in his own seat of South Armagh, and in North Westmeath. South Armagh was a three-way fight, with Parnellite, Anti-Parnellite and Unionist candidates. Blane received only 59 votes, just over 1 per cent of the votes cast. This electoral performance was not uniquely bad; all four Parnellite candidates in the province of Ulster at this election performed almost equally poorly, the best score being 123 votes at Mid Tyrone. North Westmeath was a straight fight between Parnellite and Anti-Parnellite, but Blane lost heavily here also, with under 12 per cent of the vote.

Blane was unusual in being a working-class member of the Irish Parliamentary Party, and seems to have encountered some prejudice as a result. Parnell is reported to have said, on encountering him for the first time, ‘Who is that convict-looking fellow?’. O'Brien said Blane was ‘reputed to be one of the simpler members of the party’, adding that in the debates in Committee Room 15 of the House of Commons leading to the Split he ‘achieved the tour de force of defending Parnell....from an extremist Catholic and patriotic point of view.....This defence (was) exhilarating in its combination of classicism and audacity....’.

== Later life ==
Blane did not stand for Parliament again. However he became active in working class politics. On 7 June 1896 he chaired an open-air meeting on the steps of the Custom House in Dublin which launched the Irish Socialist Republican Party, although he declined to join it himself. The first elections for Dublin Corporation under the Local Government (Ireland) Act 1898, held on 17 January 1899, involved a huge extension of the municipal franchise, from 7,954 to 38,769 in the constabulary borough, and opened up new possibilities for working class politics. Blane stood as a labour candidate in Trinity ward but although several labour candidates were successful in other wards, he missed election by 55 votes. The 1911 Census shows him living, unmarried, as a lodger at 3.2 Burgh Quay in Dublin, and gives his profession as tailor.

He died on 7 February 1917 at 16 D'Olier Street, Dublin, aged 67.

== In the arts ==
Alexander Blane appears as a minor character in Darran McCann's novel, 'After the Lockout' (2012). In the novel, an elderly Blane takes the young protagonist, Victor Lennon, a fellow Armagh exile in Dublin, under his wing, and plays a part in converting Lennon to socialism.

=== Sources ===
- Fintan Lane, The Origins of Modern Irish Socialism, 1881–1896, Cork University Press, 1997
- F. S. L. Lyons, Charles Stewart Parnell, London, Collins, 1977
- Freeman's Journal, 18 January 1899
- Conor Cruise O'Brien, Parnell and His Party 1880-90, Oxford, Clarendon Press, 1957
- The Times (London), 18 November 1881; 1 December 1885; 3, 27 & 30 January, 1 February, 20 & 28 April, 15 May, 22 August, 25 September 1888; 5 July 1892; 16 January 1899
- Brian M. Walker (ed.), Parliamentary Election Results in Ireland, 1801–1922, Dublin, Royal Irish Academy, 1978

Parliament of the United Kingdom
New constituency	Member of Parliament for South Armagh; 1885 – 1892	Succeeded by Edward McHugh
