= Edward McHugh (politician) =

Edward J McHugh (1846 – 28 August 1900), also known as Edward M'Hugh, was an Irish nationalist politician. He was an Anti-Parnellite Irish National Federation Member of Parliament (MP) for South Armagh from 1892 until his death.

The director and principal proprietor of a large drapery in Belfast, he was first elected at the 1892 general election, when he stood against the sitting Parnellite MP Alexander Blane. McHugh won a comfortable victory over the Unionist candidate, while Blane secured barely 1% of the votes. McHugh was re-elected in 1886, with a wide margin over another Unionist candidate, and held the seat until his death in August 1900. No by-election was held for his seat before Parliament was dissolved for the general election in October 1900.

Parliament of the United Kingdom
Preceded by Alexander Blane	Member of Parliament for South Armagh; 1892 – 1900	Succeeded by John Campbell
