= Peggy Kelman =

Australian aviation pioneer (1909 – 1998)

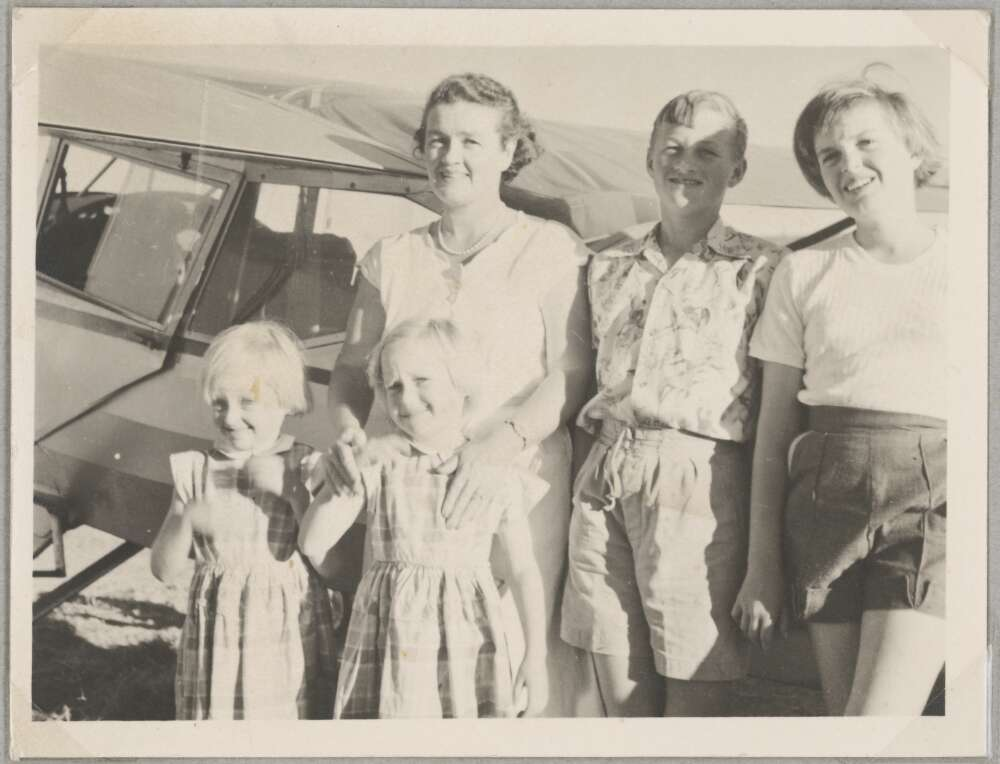
- Peggy Kelman with four of her children in front of an Auster J/4 Archer monoplane, circa 1952
- Born: Margaret Mary McKillop; 6 April 1909; Glasgow, Lanarkshire, Scotland, UK
- Died: 23 December 1998 (aged 89); Buderim, Queensland, Australia
- Occupation: Aviator
- Spouse: Colin Kelman (m. 1936-19??)
- Children: 5
- Parent: William and Rose (née Dalton) McKillop
- Awards: Order of British Empire

Margaret Mary Kelman, OBE (6 April 1909 – 23 December 1998) was an Australian pioneer aviator.

== Personal life ==
Kelman was born as Margaret Mary McKillop in Scotland in 1909, her father was the Irish nationalist politician William McKillop, and her mother, Rose (née Dalton) McKillop was from Orange, Australia. Her father died in 1909, the year of her birth. Her mother returned to Australia and Peggy was educated at Rose Bay Convent, Sydney, as well as in France and England.

On 5 November 1936 she married, in London, Colin Kelman, an Australian farmer.

Colin and Peggy Kelman then returned to Australia continued as graziers both in Moree, New South Wales and Julia Creek, Queensland; the couple had 5 children.

Her husband died on 17 January 1964. After his death, she moved to Brisbane.

Peggy McKillop Kelman died in 1998 in Buderim, Queensland, aged 89. She is buried with her husband in Buderim Cemetery. Her headstone has a depiction of a small plane and the words "Wings forever folded".

She was a devout Roman Catholic.

== Aviation career ==
Kelman began flying training in 1931 at the Aero Club of NSW and gained her A licence (now called private pilot licence) in 1932, followed by a commercial pilot licence in 1935.

Her first and only paid job was flying for Nancy Bird Walton, barnstorming in western NSW in 1935. While barnstorming near Moree, NSW, Kelman met a young grazier with his own aeroplane, his name was Colin Kelman.

After their marriage in London, Peggy and her husband bought a used twin-engined light aircraft, a Monospar, and decided to fly home to Australia. That adventure began 19 December 1936. They flew by way of France, Italy, Greece, Egypt, Iraq, Iran, Pakistan, India, Burma, Malaya, Java, Timor, Darwin and Moree and arrived home on 15 January 1937.

Kelman only ever claimed one flying record; she said she was the first and only pilot to fly from England to Australia while pregnant. She owned many aircraft including a Percival, an Auster, a Tiger Moth, a Beech Staggerwing then one of the first Cessna 182s in 1957. Kelman flew these aircraft to town to do her shopping and to social days on neighbouring properties. Age did not stop her; in her 80s, she went to the Oshkosh Air Show in Wisconsin, toured the US, went twice to the Antarctic and revisited places where she'd been a schoolgirl in Britain, France and Italy (on one trip to the Antarctic, Peggy persuaded Dick Smith to take her by helicopter to land on the ice).

== Aviation organisations ==
Kelman joined the Australian Women Pilots' Association in 1951, serving as its Queensland president, then Federal president from 1974 to 1976. She joined the international women pilots' association, The Ninety Nines, and became Australian governor of that organisation.

== Honours ==
On 3 June 1978, Kelman was appointed an OBE in Australia "For service to aviation in Queensland, particularly in the promotion of women in aviation."
