= James Gibney =

Irish politician (1847–1908)

James Gibney (14 December 1847 – 25 May 1908) was an Irish Nationalist politician. An Anti-Parnellite, he was an Irish National Federation Member of Parliament (MP) for North Meath from 1893 to 1900.

He was elected to the United Kingdom House of Commons at a by-election on 21 February 1893, after the result of the 1892 general election in North Meath was overturned on petition at the next general election, in 1895, Gibney was re-elected with a narrow majority over the Parnellite candidate John Sweetman. At the 1900 general election, when the Irish Parliamentary Party reunited after its 9-year split, Gibney stood as a Healyite Nationalist and lost seat to the Irish Parliamentary Party candidate Patrick White. Gibney was also a justice of the peace for County Meath.

== Personal life ==
Gibney was born on 14 December 1847 at Beltrasna, Oldcastle, the son of Thomas Gibney. He married firstly Bridget Hennesy (d. 1895), daughter of John Hennesy, Millbrook Mills, Oldcastle, and Castlepollard; and secondly Catharine O'Brien, daughter of Michael O'Brien, Oldtown, Navan. He had issue of two sons and two daughters.

Parliament of the United Kingdom
Preceded by Michael Davitt	Member of Parliament for North Meath; 1893 – 1900	Succeeded by Patrick White
