= John Campbell (Irish politician) =

Irish politician

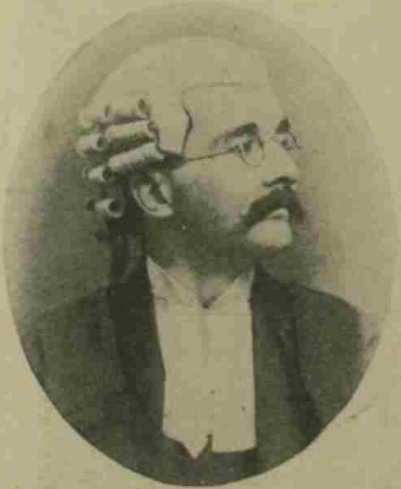

Member of Parliament for South Armagh
- In office 1 October 1900 – 12 January 1906
- Preceded by: Edward McHugh
- Succeeded by: William McKillop

Personal details
- Born: 21 December 1865 Blackwatertown, County Armagh, Ireland
- Died: Unknown
- Party: Healyite Nationalist
- Education: Royal University of Ireland

John Campbell (21 December 1865–?) was an Irish barrister and Healyite Nationalist Member of Parliament (MP) for South Armagh from 1900 – 1906.

== Early life and political career ==
Campbell was born in Blackwatertown, County Armagh, the only child of schoolteacher Daniel (c.1830-1902), and Mary Campbell. In the 1890s he studied at the Royal University of Ireland, and he was called to the bar by the Middle Temple in January 1896.

In October 1900, Campbell stood as one of sixteen Healyite Nationalist candidates, and contested the seat of South Armagh, which had been vacant since the death of Edward McHugh in August. He subsequently defeated the Irish Parliamentary candidate, Charles O'Neill, who would later win the seat in a by-election in 1909. During his time in parliament he frequently spoke on behalf of the Board of National Education, and on local affairs, particularly the running of the Armagh workhouse and post office.

Campbell did not stand for re-election in 1906, citing dissatisfaction with parliamentary life, and William McKillop was subsequently returned unopposed for the Irish Parliamentary Party.

== Later career ==
Little else is currently known about Campbell after his decision to stand down as an MP. He was a lifelong bachelor, and had no children. In June 1910 he was injured after being struck by a taxicab on Charing Cross Road in London. His last known mention in print was his attendance of a wedding in Fulham in November 1926.

Parliament of the United Kingdom
Preceded by Edward McHugh	Member of Parliament for South Armagh; 1900–1906	Succeeded by William McKillop
