= James Tuite =

Irish watchmaker and politician

James Tuite (14 November 1849 – 6 October 1916) was an Irish watchmaker and politician.

James Tuite was a watchmaker, a business inherited from his father. He was educated at St Mary's College, Mullingar, and was chairman of Mullingar Town Commissioners, 1881–1887.

He was elected Member of Parliament for North Westmeath in the general election of 1885, and remained as MP for the constituency until the election of 1900. At one stage he was imprisoned for three months as a Land League suspect. He joined the Anti-Parnellite Irish National Federation in 1891 and served as a whip.

== Notes ==
Parliament of the United Kingdom
New constituency	Member of Parliament for North Westmeath; 1885 – 1900	Succeeded by Patrick Kennedy
