= 1918 South Armagh by-election =

UK Parliamentary by-election

The 1918 South Armagh by-election was held on 2 February 1918. The by-election was held due to the death of the incumbent Irish Parliamentary Party MP, Charles O'Neill. It was won by the Irish Parliamentary candidate Patrick Donnelly. Security for the election was provided by members of the Irish Volunteers who arrived in Armagh by train and were greeted by the Tyrone Irish Republican Eamon Donnelly.

By-Election 2 February 1918: South Armagh
Party	Candidate	Votes	%	±%
Irish Nationalist	Patrick Donnelly	2,324	63.34	−10.90
Sinn Féin	Patrick McCartan	1,305	35.57	New
Ind. Unionist	Thomas Wakefield Richardson	40	1.09	New
Majority		1,019	27.77	−20.71
Turnout		6,345	57.83	+0.66
Irish Nationalist hold		Swing		
