= Patrick White (politician) =

Irish politician

Patrick White (1860–1935) was an Irish Nationalist politician. A member of the Irish Parliamentary Party, he was Member of Parliament (MP) for North Meath from 1900 to 1918.

He was elected to the United Kingdom House of Commons at the general election in October 1900, narrowly defeating (by 2324 votes to 2292) the outgoing MP James Gibney, who had stood as a Healyite Nationalist. White was re-elected unopposed at the next three general elections, but did not stand again in 1918.

Parliament of the United Kingdom
Preceded by James Gibney	Member of Parliament for North Meath; 1900 – 1918	Succeeded by Liam Mellows
