= William McKillop =

Irish politician

Personal details
- Born: 1860 Ayrshire, Scotland
- Died: 25 August 1909 (aged 48–49)
- Spouse(s): Elizabeth Wilson Fisher (m. ?–1892, her death); Rose Dalton (m. 1908)
- Children: 1 daughter, Peggy Kelman (b. May 1909)
- Occupation: Grocer and restaurant owner
- Known for: Founding committee member of Glasgow Celtic; donor of the William McKillop Cup (Armagh GAA)

William McKillop (1860 – 25 August 1909) was an Ayrshire-born grocer and restaurant-owner in Glasgow who became an Irish nationalist politician, serving for the last decade of his life as an Irish Parliamentary Party member of parliament (MP) for constituencies in Ireland. He was a founding member of the committee which established the Glasgow Celtic football club, but is probably better known for the William McKillop Cup, which he donated to Armagh Gaelic Athletic Association.

== Career ==
His father Daniel McKillop emigrated to Ayrshire from Glenarm in County Antrim. William and his brother had moved to Glasgow, where in time they set up a licensed grocers, and were successful enough to buy out other businesses including the Royal Restaurant.

The by-now prosperous McKillop family were involved in several Irish political organisations in Glasgow. William's obituary in the Freeman's Journal described him as "a staunch Irish nationalist who took a lively interest in the Irish movement in Glasgow and was a leading member of the home Government Branch to which he always gave splendid financial support." In those days, Members of Parliament were not paid, and the Irish Party therefore had to find candidates wealthy enough to support themselves. William McKillop was asked to stand as the nationalist candidate for North Sligo at the 1900 general election, and readily agreed. He was elected unopposed and soon became Treasurer of the Irish Parliamentary Party.

For reasons that are unclear, McKillop switched seats at the 1906 general election, from North Sligo to South Armagh, where he was returned unopposed. He held the seat until his death on 6 August 1909.

== Personal life ==
William McKillop's first wife, Elizabeth Wilson Fisher, died in 1892, a few years after their marriage, from complications during childbirth. The child also did not survive. He remarried in 1908, to Rose Dalton, a sister-in-law of the Willie Redmond MP from Orange, New South Wales, Australia. Their first and only child (Margaret Mary) was born in May 1909, only three months before his death.

His requiem mass was held in St Andrew's Cathedral, Glasgow, and he was buried in Dalbleth Cemetery.

After his death, Rose returned with the baby to Australia. His daughter, later known as Peggy, became a pioneer of Australian aviation.

== McKillop Cup ==
In March 1906, shortly after McKillop's election in January as MP for South Armagh, the Armagh County Committee of the GAA accepted his offer to "present a cup and set of medals for competition amongst Gaelic Football clubs in Armagh." The cup was made in Scotland, and was described by the Dundalk Democrat in 1907 as "very valuable one" and "a triumph of the silversmith's art". Made of solid silver and weighing over 82 ounces, the cup is over two feet high.

The William McKillop Cup was first presented to the winners of the 1906–07 League, and since 1931 it been awarded to the county's Senior Championship winners.

The cup was retired by the Armagh GAA in 1995, after being replaced with the Gerry Fagan Cup.

== Sources ==
- "William McKillop The Man behind the Cup". Armagh GAA website.

Parliament of the United Kingdom
Preceded by John O'Dowd	Member of Parliament for North Sligo; 1900 – 1906	Succeeded by P. A. McHugh
Preceded by John Campbell	Member of Parliament for South Armagh; 1906 – 1909	Succeeded by Charles O'Neill
