= South Armagh (UK Parliament constituency) =

Parliamentary constituency in the United Kingdom, 1885–1922

- Former county constituency for the House of Commons

1885–1922
- Seats: 1
- Created from: Armagh
- Replaced by: Armagh

South Armagh was a UK Parliament constituency in Ireland which returned one Member of Parliament from 1885 to 1922, using the first past the post electoral system.

== Boundaries and boundary changes ==
This constituency comprised the southern part of County Armagh.

From 1885 to 1918 the constituency was bounded to the north and north-west by Mid Armagh, to the south-west by South Monaghan, to the south by North Louth, to the south-east by the Borough of Newry and to the east by South Down. In 1918, that part of the constituency in the urban district of Newry was added to the South Down constituency. Between 1918 and 1922 the neighbouring seats were the same except that Louth was an undivided county constituency and Newry had been absorbed into South Down.

1885–1918: The barony of Orior Upper, and those parts of the baronies of Fews Lower, Fews Upper and Orior Lower not contained within the constituency of Mid Armagh.

1918–1922: That part of the existing South Armagh constituency comprised in the administrative county of Armagh.

Prior to the 1885 United Kingdom general election and from the dissolution of Parliament in 1922 the area was part of the Armagh constituency.

== Politics ==
The constituency was a predominantly Nationalist area. In 1918 the Nationalists heavily defeated Sinn Féin.

== First Dáil ==
Sinn Féin contested the 1918 general election on the platform that instead of taking up any seats they won in the United Kingdom Parliament, they would establish a revolutionary assembly in Dublin. In republican theory every MP elected in Ireland was a potential Deputy to this assembly. In practice only the Sinn Féin members accepted the offer.

The revolutionary First Dáil assembled on 21 January 1919 and last met on 10 May 1921. The First Dáil, according to a resolution passed on 10 May 1921, was formally dissolved on the assembling of the Second Dáil. This took place on 16 August 1921.

In 1921 Sinn Féin decided to use the UK authorised elections for the Northern Ireland House of Commons and the House of Commons of Southern Ireland as a poll for the Irish Republic's Second Dáil. This constituency, in republican theory, was incorporated in a four-member Dáil constituency of Armagh.

== Members of Parliament ==
Election	Member	Party
1885	Alexander Blane	Irish Parliamentary Party
1891	Alexander Blane	Irish National League
1892	Edward McHugh	Irish National Federation
1900	John Campbell	Healyite Nationalist
1906	William McKillop	Irish Parliamentary Party
1909	Charles O'Neill	Irish Parliamentary Party
1918	Patrick Donnelly	Irish Parliamentary Party
1922	Constituency abolished	

== Elections ==
=== Elections in the 1880s ===
General election 27 November 1885: South Armagh
Party	Candidate	Votes	%	±%
Irish Parliamentary	Alexander Blane	Unopposed		
Irish Parliamentary win (new seat)				

General election 7 July 1886: South Armagh
Party	Candidate	Votes	%	±%
Irish Parliamentary	Alexander Blane	Unopposed		
Irish Parliamentary hold				

=== Elections in the 1890s ===
General election 8 July 1892: South Armagh
Party	Candidate	Votes	%	±%
Irish National Federation	Edward McHugh	3,439	59.91	N/A
Irish Unionist	Caesar Litton Falkiner	2,242	39.06	New
Irish National League	Alexander Blane	59	1.03	N/A
Majority		1,197	20.85	N/A
Turnout		5,681	76.30	N/A
Registered electors		7,523		
Irish National Federation gain from Irish Parliamentary		Swing	N/A	

General election 25 July 1895: South Armagh
Party	Candidate	Votes	%	±%
Irish National Federation	Edward McHugh	3,378	62.87	+2.96
Irish Unionist	Walter McMurrough Kavanagh	1,995	37.13	−1.93
Majority		1,383	25.74	+4.89
Turnout		5,373	74.07	−2.23
Registered electors		7,254		
Irish National Federation hold		Swing	+2.49	

=== Elections in the 1900s ===
- Seat vacant on dissolution due to the death of McHugh

General election 9 October 1900: South Armagh
Party	Candidate	Votes	%	±%
Healyite Nationalist	John Campbell	1,646	56.62	−6.25
Irish Parliamentary	Charles O'Neill	1,261	43.38	N/A
Majority		385	13.24	N/A
Turnout		2,907	40.65	−33.42
Registered electors		7,152		
Healyite Nationalist gain from Irish Parliamentary		Swing		

General election 19 January 1906: South Armagh
Party	Candidate	Votes	%	±%
Irish Parliamentary	William McKillop	Unopposed		
Irish Parliamentary gain from Healyite Nationalist				

- Death of McKillop

By-Election 5 November 1909: South Armagh
Party	Candidate	Votes	%	±%
Irish Parliamentary	Charles O'Neill	3,160	66.00	N/A
Irish Unionist	Richard Best	1,628	34.00	New
Majority		1,532	32.00	N/A
Turnout		4,788	68.17	N/A
Registered electors		7,024		
Irish Parliamentary hold		Swing	N/A	

=== Elections in the 1910s ===
General election 22 January 1910: South Armagh
Party	Candidate	Votes	%	±%
Irish Parliamentary	Charles O'Neill	Unopposed		
Irish Parliamentary hold				

General election 6 December 1910: South Armagh
Party	Candidate	Votes	%	±%
Irish Parliamentary	Charles O'Neill	2,890	74.24	N/A
All-for-Ireland	Stephen Hugh Moynagh	1,003	25.76	N/A
Majority		1,887	48.48	N/A
Turnout		6,810	57.17	N/A
Irish Parliamentary hold		Swing	N/A	

- Death of O'Neill

By-Election 2 February 1918: South Armagh
Party	Candidate	Votes	%	±%
Irish Parliamentary	Patrick Donnelly	2,324	63.34	−10.90
Sinn Féin	Patrick McCartan	1,305	35.57	New
Ind. Unionist	Thomas Wakefield Richardson	40	1.09	New
Majority		1,019	27.77	−20.71
Turnout		6,345	57.83	+0.66
Irish Parliamentary hold		Swing	N/A	

General Election 14 December 1918: South Armagh
Party	Candidate	Votes	%	±%
Irish Parliamentary	Patrick Donnelly	4,345	98.21	+34.87
Sinn Féin	James Thomas McKee	79	1.79	−33.78
Majority		4,266	96.42	+68.65
Turnout		15,905	87.84	+30.01
Irish Parliamentary hold		Swing	+34.33	

== See also ==
- List of UK Parliament Constituencies in Ireland and Northern Ireland
- Redistribution of Seats (Ireland) Act 1918
- List of MPs elected in the 1918 United Kingdom general election
- List of Dáil Éireann constituencies in Ireland (historic)
- Members of the 1st Dáil
