= Frederick Blaney =

Irish cricketer

Personal information
- Full name: Frederick Andrews Blaney
- Born: 17 March 1918; Lisburn, Ireland
- Died: 2 February 1988 (aged 69); Groomsport, Northern Ireland
- Batting: Right-handed

Domestic team information
- Years: Team
- 1939: Ireland

Career statistics
Competition	First-class
Matches	1
Runs scored	14
Batting average	7.00
100s/50s	–/–
Top score	13
Catches/stumpings	–/–
- Source: Cricinfo, 30 December 2021

Frederick Andrews Blaney (17 March 1918 in County Antrim – 2 February 1988 in County Down) was an Irish cricketer. A right-handed batsman, he played just once for Ireland, a first-class match against Scotland in June 1939.
