= 1909 South Armagh by-election =

UK Parliamentary by-election

The 1909 South Armagh by-election was held on 5 November 1909. The by-election was held due to the death of the incumbent Irish Parliamentary MP, William McKillop. It was won by the Irish Parliamentary candidate Charles O'Neill.

By-Election 5 November 1909: South Armagh
Party	Candidate	Votes	%	±%
Irish Nationalist	Charles O'Neill	3,160	66.00	N/A
Irish Unionist	Richard Best	1,628	34.00	New
Majority		1,532	32.00	N/A
Turnout		4,788	68.17	N/A
Irish Nationalist hold		Swing	N/A	
