= Patrick Kennedy (Irish nationalist politician) =

Irish politician

Patrick James Kennedy (1864 – 10 March 1947) was an Irish nationalist politician and member of parliament (MP) in the House of Commons of the United Kingdom of Great Britain and Ireland.

He was elected as an Irish National Federation (Anti-Parnellite) MP for the North Kildare constituency at the 1892 general election, and did not contest the 1895 general election.

He was elected as a Healyite Nationalist MP at the 1900 general election for the North Westmeath constituency. He joined the Irish Parliamentary Party during the parliamentary term, but did not contest the 1906 general election.

Parliament of the United Kingdom
Preceded by James Laurence Carew	Member of Parliament for North Kildare; 1892 – 1895	Succeeded by Charles John Engledow
Preceded by James Tuite	Member of Parliament for North Westmeath; 1900 – 1906	Succeeded by Laurence Ginnell
