= Samuel Young (Irish politician) =

Irish politician

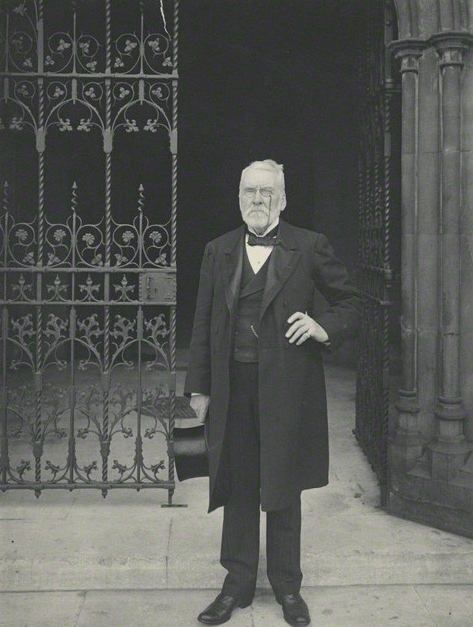
1902 photograph of Young.

Samuel Young (26 February 1822 – 18 April 1918) was an Irish brewer and Protestant nationalist politician. He was Member of Parliament (MP) for East Cavan from 1892 until 1918, becoming the oldest serving member of the House of Commons of the United Kingdom.

Born in Dunevelly, near Portaferry in County Down, Young grew up in a Church of Ireland family and attended the Old Presbyterian School in Belfast before becoming a draper, eventually coming to run his own store. In 1872, he went into partnership to open a brewery in Limavady. Among his employees was future Nationalist Party leader Joseph Devlin.

Despite his Protestant faith, Young supported the disestablishment of the Church of Ireland, and the cause of Home Rule. With Devlin's support, he was elected for the anti-Parnellite Irish National Federation in East Cavan at the 1892 general election. Already seventy years of age, he won the seat with a majority of nearly six to one over his Unionist opponent. In 1894, he founded the Ulster Liberal Land Committee, while in 1896 he sat on the Royal commission for Liquor Licensing Laws.

Unlike the majority of the Federation, Young held conservative views. He opposed the Gaelic League and in 1900 was criticised by the United Irish League (UIL) for attending a garden party at Buckingham Palace. Although he followed the Federation by joining the merger with the UIL in the re-united Irish Parliamentary Party that year, he was again criticised for attending the coronation of Edward VII and Alexandra . He defended himself as a "loyal subject" and called for Ireland under Home Rule to retain the British monarchy and share armed forces with Britain.

Young retained his Parliamentary seat, never facing any further opposition at elections, until his death in 1918 at the age of 96. By this time, he had become the oldest ever member of the UK Parliament at Westminster, and the oldest in any of its predecessor Parliaments since Francis Knollys in the seventeenth century.

Parliament of the United Kingdom
Preceded by Thomas O'Hanlon	Member of Parliament for East Cavan; 1892–1918	Succeeded by Arthur Griffith
Political offices
Preceded by Frederick Mappin	Oldest Member of Parliament (not Father of the House); 1905–1918	Succeeded by Jesse Collings
