= East Cavan =

UK parliamentary constituency in Ireland, 1885–1922

- Former county constituency for the House of Commons

1885–1922
- Seats: 1
- Created from: County Cavan
- Replaced by: Cavan

East Cavan was a parliamentary constituency in Ireland, which from 1885 to 1922 returned one Member of Parliament (MP) to the House of Commons of the United Kingdom of Great Britain and Ireland.

Prior to 1885 the area was part of the County Cavan constituency. After 1922 the area was not represented in the UK Parliament.

== Boundaries ==
This constituency comprised the eastern part of County Cavan, consisting of the baronies of Castlerahan and Clankee, and those parts of the baronies of Loughtee Upper and Tullygarvey not contained within the constituency of West Cavan.

== Members of Parliament ==
Election	Member	Party
1885	Thomas O'Hanlon	Nationalist
1891	Thomas O'Hanlon	Parnellite Nationalist
1892	Samuel Young	Anti-Parnellite Nationalist
1900	Samuel Young	Nationalist
1918(b)	Arthur Griffith	Sinn Féin
1922	Constituency abolished: See Cavan (Dáil constituency).	

== Elections ==
=== Elections in the 1880s ===
General election 30 November 1885: East Cavan
Party	Candidate	Votes	%	±%
Irish Parliamentary	Thomas O'Hanlon	Unopposed		
Registered electors		8,920		
Irish Parliamentary win (new seat)				

General election 7 July 1886: East Cavan
Party	Candidate	Votes	%	±%
Irish Parliamentary	Thomas O'Hanlon	Unopposed		
Registered electors		8,920		
Irish Parliamentary hold				

=== Elections in the 1890s ===
General election 16 July 1892: East Cavan
Party	Candidate	Votes	%	±%
Irish National Federation	Samuel Young	6,024	81.6	N/A
Irish Unionist	Henry John Beresford Clements	1,360	18.4	New
Majority		4,664	63.2	N/A
Turnout		7,384	76.9	N/A
Registered electors		9,606		
Irish National Federation gain from Irish Parliamentary		Swing	N/A	

General election 19 July 1895: East Cavan
Party	Candidate	Votes	%	±%
Irish National Federation	Samuel Young	Unopposed		
Registered electors		9,370		
Irish National Federation hold				

=== Elections in the 1900s ===
General election 5 October 1900: East Cavan
Party	Candidate	Votes	%	±%
Irish Parliamentary	Samuel Young	Unopposed		
Registered electors		9,372		
Irish Parliamentary hold				

General election 19 January 1906: East Cavan
Party	Candidate	Votes	%	±%
Irish Parliamentary	Samuel Young	Unopposed		
Registered electors		8,946		
Irish Parliamentary hold				

=== Elections in the 1910s ===
General election 19 January 1910: East Cavan
Party	Candidate	Votes	%	±%
Irish Parliamentary	Samuel Young	Unopposed		
Registered electors		8,981		
Irish Parliamentary hold				

General election 6 December 1910: East Cavan
Party	Candidate	Votes	%	±%
Irish Parliamentary	Samuel Young	Unopposed		
Registered electors		8,981		
Irish Parliamentary hold				

By-election 20 June 1918: East Cavan
Party	Candidate	Votes	%	±%
Sinn Féin	Arthur Griffith	3,795	59.5	New
Irish Parliamentary	John O'Hanlon	2,581	40.5	N/A
Majority		1,214	19.0	N/A
Turnout		6,376	72.3	N/A
Registered electors		8,821		
Sinn Féin gain from Irish Parliamentary		Swing	N/A	

General Election 14 December 1918: East Cavan
Party	Candidate	Votes	%	±%
Sinn Féin	Arthur Griffith	Unopposed		
Registered electors		21,148		
Sinn Féin gain from Irish Parliamentary				
