= Healyite Nationalist =

- Leader: Tim Healy
- Founded: 1895
- Dissolved: 1906
- Split from: Irish National Federation
- Merged into: All-for-Ireland League
- Ideology: Irish nationalism Religious conservatism Anti-Parnellite
- Political position: Right-wing

Tim Healy, c. 1915

In Irish politics of the 1890s and 1900s, the Healyite Nationalists (sometimes also known as Independent Nationalists) were Irish nationalist politicians who supported Tim Healy MP.

Healy was the most outspoken member of the Anti-Parnellite majority in the Irish Parliamentary Party. In the years following the revelation of the O'Shea scandal in 1890 he became estranged from the movement, setting up his own personal organisation as Member of parliament (MP) for North Louth in 1892, together with five fellow MPs, under the name "People's Rights Association". It was dubbed the 'clerical' party due to Healy's closeness to his clerical ally Cardinal Michael Logue.

The parliamentary election results in Ireland at the 1895 general election show eight Healyite Nationalist MPs returned to the House of Commons of the United Kingdom. These, apart from Tim Healy, included James Gibney, Maurice Healy, Arthur O'Connor and Timothy Daniel Sullivan.

At the next general election, in 1900, Healyites stood in sixteen constituencies. Six were elected: John Campbell (South Armagh), John Hammond (Carlow County), Peter Ffrench (South Wexford), James Laurence Carew (South Meath), Tim Healy (North Louth) and Patrick Kennedy (North Westmeath). One of those who failed to be elected was William Martin Murphy, a close associate of Healy.

Finally, at the general election of 1906, this number fell to one, Tim Healy himself, who later associated himself with the All-for-Ireland League.
