= Corn Exchange, Thrapston =

Commercial building in Thrapston, Northamptonshire, England

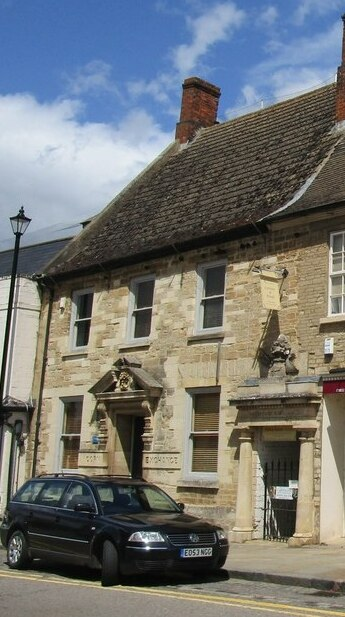
- Corn Exchange, Thrapston

- Shown in Northamptonshire
- 52.3971°N 0.5373°W
- Location: High Street, Thrapston

History
- Built: c.1750

Site notes
- Architectural style: Vernacular style

Listed Building – Grade II
- Official name: Numbers 47 (Corn Exchange), 49 and 51
- Designated: 6 June 1986
- Reference no.: 1226805

The Corn Exchange is a commercial building in the High Street in Thrapston, Northamptonshire, England. The structure, which is now used as the offices of a local firm of auctioneers and estate agents, is a Grade II listed building.

== History ==
The building was originally commissioned as a public house known as The George Inn and was built in rubble masonry in around 1750. The design involved a symmetrical main frontage of three bays facing onto the High Street. Following the repeal of the Corn Laws in 1846, a locally-born designer and hydraulic engineer, Freeman Roe, whose offices were in The Strand in London, decided to initiate a major remodelling of the building to create a corn exchange.

The foundation stone for the remodelled structure was laid on 5 October 1850. The works, which were carried out by a local contractor, John Eaton, involved the construction of a new doorway, which was flanked by stone panels inscribed with the words "Corn Exchange" and by brackets supporting a pediment containing a carved wheatsheaf and two scythes. The outer bays on the ground floor and all the bays on the first floor were newly fenestrated with sash windows. An additional entrance was installed to the right: it was flanked by Doric order columns supporting an entablature, inscribed with the words "Erected by F. Roe 1850", a dentilled cornice and carvings of a plough and a wheatsheaf. Internally, the principal room was a new main hall which was 50 feet (15 m) long and 35 feet (11 m) wide and capable of accommodating 400 people.

Roe went on to design the Manchester Fountains in front of the Manchester Lunatic Hospital in Piccadilly Gardens for Queen Victoria's visit to Manchester in October 1851.

The building was also used for public events including lectures and speeches. The Conservative Party candidate, Brownlow Cecil, delivered a speech in the main hall during the 1877 North Northamptonshire by-election. However, the use of the building as a corn exchange declined significantly in the wake of the Great Depression of British Agriculture in the late 19th century. In 1900, the building was acquired by a local firm of auctioneers and estate agents, Terrence Hodgkins Associates, later rebranded as Hodgkins Boden Associates. However, the main hall has continued to be hired out for public events such as local fairs.

== See also ==
- Corn exchanges in England
