= Earl Peel =

Earldom in the Peerage of the United Kingdom

- Blazon Arms: Argent, three Sheaves of three Arrows proper, two and one banded Gules, on a Chief Azure, a Bee volant Or. Crest: A Demi-Lion rampant Argent, gorged with a Collar Azure, charged with three Bezants, holding between the paws a Shuttle Or. Supporters: Dexter: A Lion reguardant Argent. Sinister: A Gryphon reguardent Or. Both gorged with a Chain Or, pendent therefrom an Escutcheon Azure, charged with a Mace erect Or. Note:The Martlet for difference was only on the arms until the 2nd Earl inherited the baronetcy in 1942.
- Creation date: 10 July 1929
- Created by: King George V
- Peerage: Peerage of the United Kingdom
- First holder: William Peel, 1st Earl Peel
- Present holder: William Peel, 3rd Earl Peel
- Heir apparent: Ashton Peel, Viscount Clanfield
- Remainder to: the 1st Earl's heirs male
- Subsidiary titles: Viscount Peel; Viscount Clanfield; Baronet 'of Drayton Manor'
- Status: Extant
- Motto: INDUSTRIA (With industry)

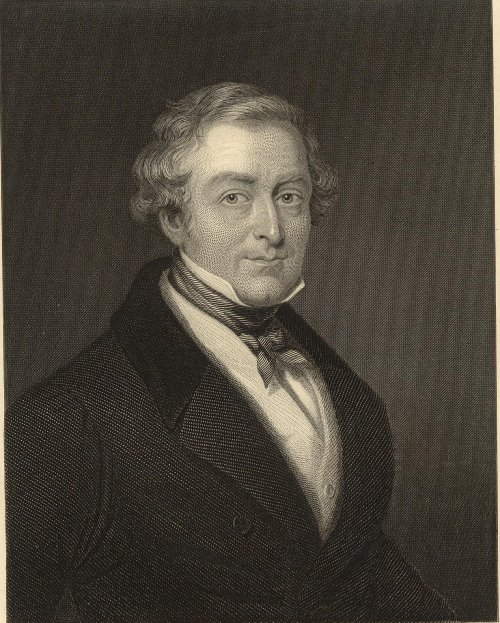
Sir Robert Peel, 2nd Baronet.

Earl Peel is a title in the Peerage of the United Kingdom. The Peel family descends from Robert Peel, eldest son of a wealthy cotton merchant. The family lands, known as Drayton Manor, in the County of Stafford would become more commonly known in modern-day as an amusement park. The family seat is Elmire House, near Ripon, North Yorkshire.

== History ==
The earldom was created in 1929 for the Conservative Party politician William Peel, 2nd Viscount Peel, who was Chancellor of the Duchy of Lancaster 1921–1922, Secretary of State for India 1921–1922 and 1928–1929, and First Commissioner of Works 1924–1928. At the same time, he was created Viscount Clanfield, of Clanfield in the County of Southampton, also in the Peerage of the United Kingdom.

He was the son of Arthur Peel, 1st Viscount Peel, who served as Speaker of the House of Commons between 1884 and 1895, and who was created Viscount Peel, of Sandy in the County of Bedford, in the Peerage of the United Kingdom in 1895.

The first Viscount Peel was the fifth son of Prime Minister Sir Robert Peel, 2nd Baronet, of Drayton Manor (see below for earlier history of the family). The first Earl was succeeded by his son, Arthur Peel, 2nd Earl Peel. In 1942, he succeeded his second cousin once removed as seventh Baronet, of Drayton Manor. The second Earl later served as Lord-Lieutenant of Lancashire from 1948 to 2 January 1951. As of 2017 the titles are held by his son, William Peel, 3rd Earl Peel, who succeeded in 1969.

He is one of the ninety elected hereditary peers that remain in the House of Lords after the passing of the House of Lords Act 1999, and sits as a cross-bencher. The third Earl was Lord Warden of the Stannaries from 1994 to 2006 and was Lord Chamberlain of the Household from 2006 to 2021.

The Peel family descends from Robert Peel, who established a calico-printing firm in Blackburn in 1764. His eldest son, Robert Peel, was a wealthy cotton merchant and also sat as Member of Parliament for Tamworth from 1790 to 1818. In 1800 he was created a Baronet, of Drayton Manor in the County of Stafford and of Bury in the County Palatine of Lancaster, in the Baronetage of Great Britain.

He was succeeded by his eldest son, Sir Robert Peel, 2nd Baronet, the noted statesman. He was Home Secretary 1822–1827 and 1828–1830, Chancellor of the Exchequer 1834–1835 and Prime Minister of the United Kingdom 1834–1835 and 1841–1846, and is best remembered for creating the modern concept of the police force while Home Secretary. The police, first known as Peelers, are still commonly referred to as Bobbies, in his name. He is also known for overseeing the formation of the Conservative Party out of the shattered Tory Party, and for the repeal of the Corn Laws. Peel died after a fall from his horse on Constitution Hill in London.

He was succeeded by his eldest son, the third Baronet. He was also a politician and served as a Lord of the Admiralty from 1852 to 1857 and as Chief Secretary for Ireland from 1861 to 1865. His grandson, the fifth Baronet, married the actress and comedian Beatrice Lillie.

Their only son, the sixth Baronet, was an ordinary seaman in the Royal Navy and was killed in action in April 1942, aged only twenty-one. On his death the line of the eldest son of the second Baronet failed and the title was inherited by his second cousin once removed, the second Earl Peel, who became the seventh Baronet. See above for further history of the title.

== Viscounts Peel (1895) ==
- Arthur Wellesley Peel, 1st Viscount Peel (1829–1912)
- William Robert Wellesley Peel, 2nd Viscount Peel (1867–1937) (created Earl Peel in 1929)

== Earls Peel (1929) ==
- William Robert Wellesley Peel, 1st Earl Peel (1867–1937)
- Arthur William Ashton Peel, 2nd Earl Peel (1901–1969) (succeeded as the 7th Baronet in 1942)
- William James Robert Peel, 3rd Earl Peel and 8th Baronet (born 1947)

The heir apparent is the present holder's son, Ashton Robert Gerard Peel, Viscount Clanfield (born 1976).
The heir apparent's heir apparent is his son, the Hon. Nicholas Robert William Peel (born 2015).

== Peel baronets, of Drayton Manor and Bury (1800) ==
- Sir Robert Peel, 1st Baronet (1750–1830)
- Sir Robert Peel, 2nd Baronet (1788–1850)
- Sir Robert Peel, 3rd Baronet (1822–1895)
- Sir Robert Peel, 4th Baronet (1867–1925)
- Sir Robert Peel, 5th Baronet (1898–1934)
- Sir Robert Peel, 6th Baronet (1920–1942)

See above for further succession.

== Other notable members of the Peel family ==
Several other members of the Peel family have also gained distinction:

- Sir Lawrence Peel (1801–1865), son of Joseph Peel, younger brother of the first Baronet, was Chief Justice of the Supreme Court at Calcutta 1842–1855 and was admitted to the Privy Council in 1856.
- William Yates Peel (1789–1858, second son of the first Baronet, was a politician and served as Under-Secretary of State for Home Affairs 1828–1830.
- Edmund Peel (1791–1850), third son of the first Baronet, Member of Parlament for Newcastle-under-Lyme 1831–1832 and 1835–1837.
- John Peel (1798–1875), fourth son of the first Baronet, Dean of Worcester 1845–1874.
- Jonathan Peel (1799–1879), fifth son of the first Baronet, was a general in the Army and Conservative politician. He was Secretary of State for War 1858–1859 and 1866–1867.
- Edmund Yates Peel (1824–1900, son of Jonathan above), a lieutenant-colonel in the Army, who was the father of Frederick Peel, a colonel in the Army.
- Archibald Peel (1828–1910, son of Jonathan above), who was the father of Edward John Russell Peel (1869–1939), a brigadier-general in the Army,
- John Peel (1829–1892, son of Jonathan above), a lieutenant-general in the Army.
- Sir Charles Lennox Peel (1823–1899), Clerk of the Council, was the son of Laurence Peel, sixth son of the first Baronet.
- Sir Frederick Peel (1823–1906), second son of the second Baronet, was a politician and Chief Railway Commissioner.
- Sir William Peel (1824–1858), third son of the second Baronet, was a captain in the Royal Navy.
- Maj. Hon. George Peel (1869–1956), second son of the first Viscount, a Member of Parliament and writer on politics and economics.
- Sir Sidney Peel (1870–1938), third son of the first Viscount, sat as Member of Parliament for Uxbridge and was created a baronet in 1936 (see Peel baronets).
- Abram Peel (1864–1919), elected Lord Mayor of Bradford in November 1916.

== Title succession chart ==
Title succession chart, Peel baronets, Viscounts Peel and Earls Peel.

Peel baronetcy of Drayton Manor and Bury
Sir Robert Peel; 1st Baronet; 1750–1830
Sir Robert Peel; 2nd Baronet; 1788–1850; Prime Minister of the United Kingdom; 1834–35, 1841–46
Viscount Peel
Sir Robert Peel; 3rd Baronet; 1822–1895	Sir Frederick Peel; 1823–1906	Capt. Sir William Peel; 1824–1858	John Peel; 1827–1910	Arthur Peel; 1st Viscount Peel; 1829–1912
Earl Peel	Peel baronetcy of Eyeworth
Sir Robert Peel; 4th Baronet; 1867–1925	William Peel; 1st Earl Peel; 2nd Viscount Peel; 1867–1937	Sir Sidney Peel; 1st Baronet; 1870–1938
Baronetcy extinct
Sir Robert Peel; 5th Baronet; 1898–1934	Arthur Peel; 2nd Earl Peel; 7th Baronet; 1901–1969
Sir Robert Peel; 6th Baronet; 1920–1942	William Peel; 3rd Earl Peel born 1947
Baronetcy inherited by the 2nd Earl Peel
Ashton Peel; Viscount Clanfield born 1976
Hon. Nicholas Peel born 2015

== Line of succession ==
Line of succession
- Arthur William Ashton Peel, 2nd Earl Peel (1901–1969)
  - William James Robert Peel, 3rd Earl Peel (born 1947)
    - (1) Ashton Robert Gerard Peel, Viscount Clanfield (born 1976)
      - (2) Hon. Nicholas Robert William Peel (born 2015)
  - (3) Hon. Robert Michael Arthur Peel (born 1950)

There are further heirs to the viscountcy descended from the younger brothers of the first earl, along with heirs to the baronetcy descended from the younger sons of the first baronet.

Baronetage of Great Britain
Preceded by Milman baronets	Peel baronets of Drayton Manor and Bury; 29 November 1800	Succeeded by Stirling baronets
