= William Peel, 3rd Earl Peel =

British peer and Lord Chamberlain from 2006 to 2021

The Right Honourable The Earl Peel GCVO PC DL
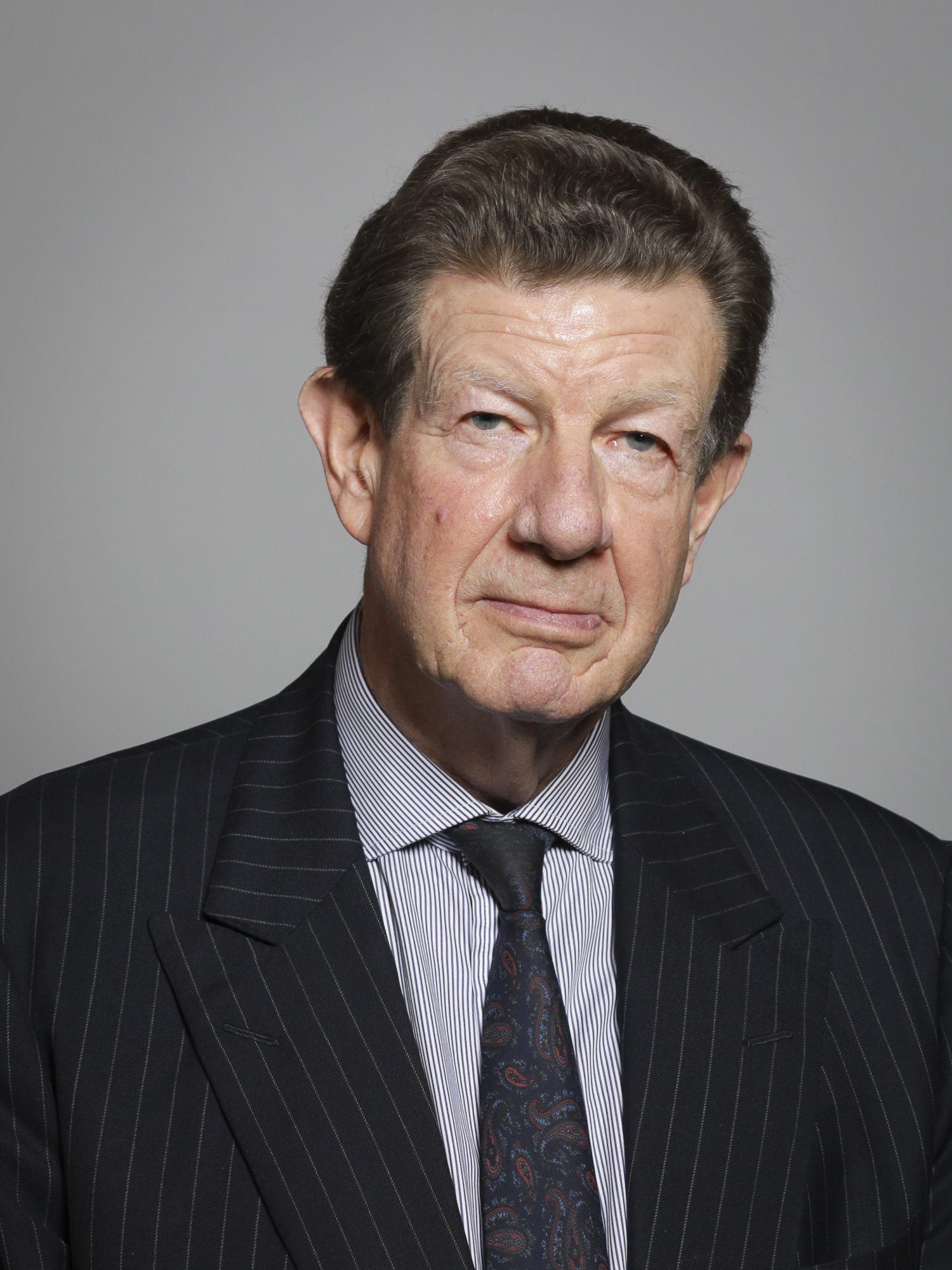
- Official portrait, 2019

Lord Chamberlain of the Household
- In office 16 October 2006 – 31 March 2021
- Monarch: Elizabeth II
- Preceded by: The Lord Luce
- Succeeded by: The Lord Parker of Minsmere

Member of the House of Lords
- Lord Temporal
- Hereditary peerage 15 May 1973 – 11 November 1999
- Preceded by: The 2nd Earl Peel
- Succeeded by: Seat abolished
- Elected Hereditary Peer; 11 November 1999 – 29 April 2026
- Election: 1999
- Preceded by: Seat established
- Succeeded by: Seat abolished

Personal details
- Born: William James Robert Peel; 3 October 1947 (age 79)
- Party: Crossbench
- Other political affiliations: Conservative (until July 2006)
- Spouses: Veronica Timpson (m. 1973; div. 1987) The Hon. Charlotte Soames (m. 1989)
- Children: 3
- Parent: Arthur Peel, 2nd Earl Peel (father)
- Education: University of Tours; Royal Agricultural University
- Occupation: Businessman, peer and politician
- Other titles: 4th Viscount Peel; 8th Baronet (of Drayton Manor and Bury)

William James Robert Peel, 3rd Earl Peel (born 3 October 1947), styled Viscount Clanfield until 1969, is a British hereditary peer who was a Conservative peer from 15 May 1973 until October 2006 when, on his appointment as Lord Chamberlain of the Royal Household, he became a crossbench (non-partisan) member of the House of Lords.

== Background and education ==
Peel is the eldest son of Arthur Peel, 2nd Earl Peel, and Kathleen McGrath, daughter of Michael McGrath. He is a great-great-grandson of Prime Minister Sir Robert Peel. He attended Ampleforth College, and then went on to the University of Tours in France and the Royal Agricultural University, Cirencester.

== Career ==
Peel was a member of the Prince's Council, part of the Duchy of Cornwall, from 1993 to 2006, and Lord Warden of the Stannaries from 1994 to 2006. He was a member of the Nature Conservancy Council, with English Nature, from 1991 to 1996. He was Chairman of the Game Conservancy Trust from 1994 to 2000, then President from 2000 to 2008, and was President of the Yorkshire Wildlife Trust from 1989 to 1996. Peel was also on the Yorkshire Dales National Park Committee for six years and became a Deputy Lieutenant of North Yorkshire in 1998. Peel was elected as one of the 42 Conservative hereditary peers who were to remain in the House of Lords after the House of Lords Act 1999 came into force, he placed 14th in the election with 142 votes. Since July 2006 he has sat as a Crossbench member.

In June 2006, it was announced that Peel would succeed Richard Luce, Baron Luce, as Lord Chamberlain. On 11 October 2006, he kissed hands with The Queen upon his appointment and was invested as a Knight Grand Cross of the Royal Victorian Order (GCVO), and became Chancellor of the Order. On 14 November 2006, Lord Peel was sworn in as a Member of the Privy Council.

In February 2021, Andrew Parker, Baron Parker of Minsmere, was appointed to succeed Peel as Lord Chamberlain. Peel was due to retire at the end of 2020 but extended his notice period as his successor was searched for amid the COVID-19 pandemic. He retired on 31 March.

On 13 April 2021, Peel returned his Wand and Insignia of Office as Lord Chamberlain and the Badge of Chancellor of the Royal Victorian Order on leaving office. At the same time he was invested with the Royal Victorian Chain.

== Family ==
Peel married Veronica Naomi Livingston Timpson (born 21 January 1950) and had two children: Ashton and Iona. The marriage was dissolved in 1987.

Peel married a second time to Charlotte Clementine Soames (born 18 July 1954), daughter of Christopher Soames, Baron Soames, and his wife, Mary Churchill, daughter of Sir Winston Churchill, on 15 April 1989. They had one daughter, Lady Antonia Peel, in 1991.

== Honours ==
Country	Date	Appointment	Ribbon	Post-nominal letters	Ref
United Kingdom	3 April 1998	Deputy Lieutenant of North Yorkshire		DL	
United Kingdom	10 October 2006	Knight Grand Cross of the Royal Victorian Order		GCVO	
United Kingdom	14 November 2006	Member of His Majesty's Most Honourable Privy Council		PC	
United Kingdom	13 April 2021	Recipient of the Royal Victorian Chain			
Spain	12 July 2017	Commander of the Royal Order of Isabella the Catholic		OYC	

== Arms ==
Coat of arms of William Peel, 3rd Earl Peel
Coronet A coronet of an earl Crest A Demi Lion rampant Argent, gorged with a Collar Azure charged with three Bezants, holding between the paws a Shuttle Or Escutcheon Argent three Sheaves of as many Arrows proper, two and one banded Gules, on a Chief Azure a Bee volant Or, a Martlet Gules for difference (Shown left) Supporters On the dexter side a Lion reguardant Argent, and on the sinister side a Gryphon reguardant Or, each gorged with a Chain of the last, pendent therefrom an Escutcheon Azure, charged with a Mace erect, also Or Motto Industria

== Notes ==
Court offices
Preceded by The Lord Ashburton	Lord Warden of the Stannaries; 1994–2006	Succeeded by Sir Nicholas Bacon, Bt
Preceded by The Lord Luce	Lord Chamberlain; 2006–2021	Succeeded by The Lord Parker of Minsmere
Peerage of the United Kingdom
Preceded by Arthur Peel	Earl Peel; 1969–present Member of the House of Lords (1973–1999)	Incumbent; Heir apparent: Ashton Peel, Viscount Clanfield
Preceded by Arthur Peel	Viscount Peel; 1969–present	Incumbent; Heir apparent: Ashton Peel, Viscount Clanfield
Baronetage of Great Britain
Preceded by Arthur Peel	Baronet of Drayton Manor and Bury; 1969–present	Incumbent; Heir apparent: Ashton Peel, Viscount Clanfield
Parliament of the United Kingdom
New office created by the House of Lords Act 1999	Elected hereditary peer to the House of Lords under the House of Lords Act 1999; 1999–2026	Office abolished under the House of Lords (Hereditary Peers) Act 2026
