= Charles Spencer, 6th Earl Spencer =

British politician and courtier (1857–1922)

The Right Honourable The Earl Spencer KG GCVO VD PC
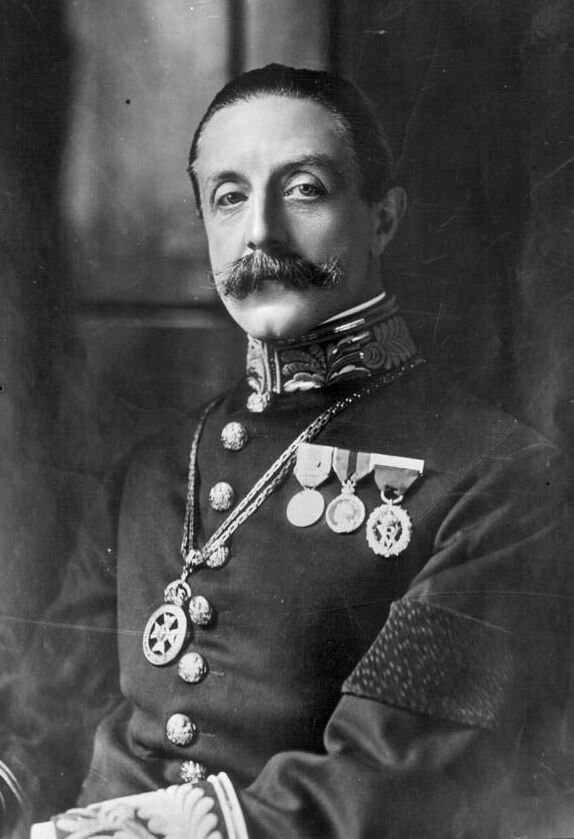

Lord Chamberlain of the Household
- In office 18 December 1905 – 14 February 1912
- Monarchs: Edward VII; George V
- Prime Minister: Sir Henry Campbell-Bannerman; H. H. Asquith
- Preceded by: The Earl of Clarendon
- Succeeded by: The Lord Sandhurst

Personal details
- Born: 30 October 1857 St James's, Westminster, London, England
- Died: 26 September 1922 (aged 64) St James Place, Westminster, London, England
- Party: Liberal
- Spouse: The Hon. Margaret Baring (m. 1887; died 1906)
- Children: 6, including Adelaide, Albert, and Margaret
- Parent: Frederick Spencer, 4th Earl Spencer (father)
- Education: Trinity College, Cambridge

Charles Robert Spencer, 6th Earl Spencer (30 October 1857 – 26 September 1922), styled The Honourable Charles Spencer until 1905 and known as Viscount Althorp between 1905 and 1910, was a British courtier and Liberal politician from the Spencer family. An MP from 1880 to 1895 and again from 1900 to 1905, he served as Vice-Chamberlain of the Household from 1892 to 1895. Raised to the peerage as Viscount Althorp in 1905, he was Lord Chamberlain from 1905 to 1912 in the Liberal administrations headed by Sir Henry Campbell-Bannerman and H. H. Asquith. In 1910, he succeeded his half-brother as Earl Spencer. He was married to Margaret Baring, a member of the Baring family.

== Early life and education ==
Known as "Bobby", Spencer was born in St. James's, Westminster, the son of Frederick Spencer, 4th Earl Spencer, by his second wife Adelaide Seymour, daughter of Horace Seymour and granddaughter of Lord Hugh Seymour. John Spencer, 5th Earl Spencer, was his elder half-brother. He was educated at Harrow and Trinity College, Cambridge.

== Political career ==
Spencer represented Northamptonshire North in parliament from 1880 to 1885 and Northamptonshire Mid from 1885 to 1895 and again from 1900 to 1905, from his home at Dallington Hall. In 1898, he contested Hertford. He was a Groom in Waiting to Queen Victoria between February and June 1886. In 1892, he was sworn of the Privy Council and appointed Vice-Chamberlain of the Household under William Ewart Gladstone, a post he held until 1895, the last year under the premiership of Lord Rosebery. Between 1900 and 1905, he was a Liberal whip.

On 19 December 1905, Spencer was created Viscount Althorp, of Great Brington in the County of Northampton, to allow him to become Lord Chamberlain in Sir Henry Campbell-Bannerman's new Liberal administration. (His older brother was still Earl Spencer at that time, but was 70 years old and childless, and so it was clear that his younger brother would inherit.) On 13 August 1910, he inherited the earldom on the death of his childless elder brother, John Spencer, 5th Earl Spencer. He remained Lord Chamberlain until 1912. From 1908 to 1922, he was Lord Lieutenant of Northamptonshire. He was made a Knight Grand Cross of the Royal Victorian Order in 1911 and a Knight Companion of the Garter in 1913. He was also awarded the Volunteer Reserve Decoration.

Lord Spencer held a large number of foreign decorations: the Grand Crosses of Order of the Dannebrog of Denmark, Royal Norwegian Order of St Olav, Order of the Polar Star of Sweden, Order of the Rising Sun of Japan, the White Eagle of Serbia, Order of the Red Eagle of Prussia and Royal and Distinguished Spanish Order of Carlos III. He was also an honorary major in and later honorary colonel of the 4th Volunteer Battalion, Northamptonshire Regiment.

== Personal life ==
Lord Spencer married the Hon. Margaret Baring (14 December 1868 – 4 July 1906), daughter of Edward Baring, 1st Baron Revelstoke and Louisa Emily Charlotte Bulteel, at St James's Church, Piccadilly, on 23 July 1887. They had six children:

- Lady Adelaide Margaret "Delia" Spencer (26 June 1889 – 16 January 1981), married Sir Sidney Peel, 1st Baronet.
- Albert Edward John Spencer, 7th Earl Spencer (23 May 1892 – 9 June 1975), married in 1919 Lady Cynthia Elinor Beatrix Hamilton (16 August 1897 – 4 December 1972). They had two children. By their son, they became the paternal grandparents of Diana, Princess of Wales.
- Lieutenant commander the Hon. Cecil Edward Robert Spencer RN DSC Croix de Guerre (20 May 1894 – 14 February 1928), died unmarried in a riding accident.
- Lady Lavinia Emily Spencer (29 September 1899 – 9 May 1955), married the 4th Baron Annaly and had issue, including Luke White, 5th Baron Annaly. Lady Annaly was an extra Lady-in-Waiting to Queen Elizabeth the Queen Mother when she was Duchess of York.
- Captain the Hon. George Charles Spencer (15 August 1903 – October 1982), married (1) Barbara Blumenthal and had issue, married (2) Kathleen Henderson; no issue.
- Lady Alexandra Margaret Elizabeth Spencer (4 July 1906 – 26 May 1996), married the Hon. Henry Douglas-Home (son of the 13th Earl of Home) and had issue. She was the author of A Spencer Childhood, published in 1994.

Viscountess Althorp died in 1906 shortly after giving birth to their sixth child.

== Death ==
Lord Spencer died on 26 September 1922 at his home in St James Place, London, aged 64. He had been ill for four months after contracting a "chill" at a public event in his home county, Northamptonshire. His eldest son Albert succeeded in the earldom. Lord Spencer was buried next to his wife in Saint Mary the Virgin with St John Churchyard, Great Brington, Northamptonshire.

His estate was valued at £1,197,326 for probate, which attracted death duties amounting to approximately £359,197.

== Coat of arms ==
Coat of arms of Charles Spencer, 6th Earl Spencer
Coronet A Coronet of an Earl Crest Out of a Ducal Coronet Or a Griffin's Head Azure gorged with a Bar Gemelle Gules between two Wings expanded of the second Escutcheon Quarterly Argent and Gules in the 2nd and 3rd quarters a Fret Or over all on a Bend Sable three Escallops of the first Supporters Dexter: A Griffin per fess Ermine and Erminois gorged with a Collar Sable the edges flory-counterflory and chained of the last and on the Collar three Escallops Argent; Sinister: A Wyvern Erect on his tail Ermine similarly collared and chained Motto Dieu Defend Le Droit (God defend the right)

Parliament of the United Kingdom
Preceded by Sackville Stopford-Sackville; Lord Burghley	Member of Parliament for North Northamptonshire; 1880–1885; With: Lord Burghley	Succeeded by Edward Monckton
New constituency	Member of Parliament for Mid Northamptonshire; 1885–1895	Succeeded by Sir James Pender, Bt
Preceded by Sir James Pender, Bt	Member of Parliament for Mid Northamptonshire; 1900–1905	Succeeded by Harry Manfield
Court offices
Preceded by Lord Burghley	Vice-Chamberlain of the Household; 1892–1895	Succeeded by Ailwyn Fellowes
Preceded by The Earl of Clarendon	Lord Chamberlain; 1905–1912	Succeeded by The Lord Sandhurst
Honorary titles
Preceded by The Earl Spencer	Lord Lieutenant of Northamptonshire; 1908–1922	Succeeded by The Marquess of Exeter
Peerage of Great Britain
Preceded by John Spencer	Earl Spencer; 1910–1922	Succeeded by Albert Spencer
Peerage of the United Kingdom
New creation	Viscount Althorp; 1905–1922	Succeeded by Albert Spencer
