= Arthur Peel (disambiguation) =

Arthur Peel, 1st Viscount Peel (1829–1912) was a British politician, Speaker of the House of Commons.

Arthur Peel may also refer to:

- Arthur Peel, 2nd Earl Peel (1901–1969), British peer
- Sir Arthur Peel (diplomat) (1861–1952), British envoy to Thailand, Brazil and Bulgaria
- George Peel (Arthur George Villiers Peel, 1869–1956), British Member of Parliament and writer on politics and economics
