= 1877 North Northamptonshire by-election =

UK Parliamentary by-election

The 1877 North Northamptonshire by-election was fought on 13 August 1877. The by-election was fought due to the death of the incumbent Conservative MP, George Ward Hunt. It was won by the Conservative candidate Brownlow Cecil.

1877 North Northamptonshire by-election (1 seat)
Party	Candidate	Votes	%	±%
Conservative	Brownlow Cecil	2,261	60.5	N/A
Liberal	Edmund Wyatt-Edgell	1,475	39.5	New
Majority		786	21.0	N/A
Turnout		3,736	74.2	N/A
Registered electors		5,033		
Conservative hold				
