= William Charles Wentworth-FitzWilliam, Viscount Milton =

English nobleman and politician (1812-1835)

The Viscount Milton

Member of Parliament
- In office 1832–1835 Serving with Charles Pepys (1832–1833); James Brudenell (1833–1835)
- Preceded by: Henry Gally Knight; Charles Pepys
- Succeeded by: Thomas Philip Maunsell; James Brudenell
- Constituency: Malton (1832–1833); North Northamptonshire (1833–1835)

Personal details
- Born: William Charles Wentworth-FitzWilliam; 18 January 1812
- Died: 8 November 1835 (aged 23)
- Cause of death: Typhus
- Party: Whig
- Spouse: Selina Jenkinson (m. 1833)
- Parent: Charles Wentworth-Fitzwilliam (father)
- Relatives: George Wentworth-FitzWilliam (brother); William Thomas Wentworth-Fitzwillam (brother); Charles Wentworth-Fitzwilliam (brother); Francis Bridgeman (nephew)
- Education: Trinity College, Cambridge

William Charles Wentworth-FitzWilliam, Viscount Milton (18 January 1812 – 8 November 1835) was an English nobleman and politician. He served in Parliament from 1832 to his death in 1835, and was one of the youngest people to serve in Parliament in the modern era.

Wentworth-Fitzwilliam was the fourth child and eldest son of Charles Wentworth-Fitzwilliam, Viscount Milton and his wife Mary, née Dundas, the daughter of Thomas Dundas, 1st Baron Dundas. He was educated at Eton College and Trinity College, Cambridge.

While still an undergraduate, Wentworth-Fitzwilliam supported his father in the 1831 general election at Northamptonshire. Viscount Milton had retired from Parliament in 1830 following the death of his wife, and had accepted the Northamptonshire nomination but refused to campaign. Wentworth-Fitzwilliam represented him on the hustings, impressing his opponents and raising his profile.

In the 1832 general election, he was elected to Parliament for Malton, a seat previously represented by his father in 1806–1807. Like his father, he was a Whig. Ten days into the parliamentary term, his grandfather, Earl Fitzwilliam, died, meaning that his father succeeded to the earldom and Wentworth-FitzWilliam became the new Viscount Milton. As an earl, the father was now a member of the House of Lords, meaning his seat in North Northamptonshire became vacant, and Wentworth-Fitzwilliam chose to stand for the more prestigious county seat. He was elected there in a by-election in early 1833, and re-elected at the 1835 general election. However, he died of typhus in November of that year aged 23.

Having been aged only 20 when first elected, Wentworth-Fitzwilliam was technically underage, although it was not seen as preventing his election. This may have been because it was understood he would be 21 before Parliament assembled in January 1833. The minimum age to serve in Parliament at this point had been 21 for many years, and set in legislation in 1695. While a substantial number of MPs were still elected as minors during the eighteenth century, and allowed to take their seats, this had fallen out of practice by the time of the 1832 Reform Act. Wentworth-Fitzwilliam is believed to have been the only minor returned to Parliament after 1832, and would remain the youngest post-Reform MP until 2015, when Mhairi Black was elected aged 20 following a change in the law.
