= Lord John Joicey-Cecil =

British politician (1867–1942)

Member of Parliament for Stamford
- In office 1906–1910
- Preceded by: William Younger
- Succeeded by: Claud Heathcote-Drummond-Willoughby

Personal details
- Born: 3 March 1867
- Died: 25 June 1942 (aged 75)
- Spouse: Isabella Maud Joicey (after 1896)
- Relations: Brownlow Cecil, 4th Marquess of Exeter (brother); Lord William Cecil (brother)
- Parent(s): William Cecil, 3rd Marquess of Exeter; Lady Georgina Pakenham

Colonel Lord John Pakenham Joicey-Cecil (3 March 1867 – 25 June 1942) was a British Conservative politician.

== Early life ==
Joicey-Cecil was the fourth son of William Cecil, 3rd Marquess of Exeter, and his wife Lady Georgina Sophia, daughter of Thomas Pakenham, 2nd Earl of Longford. Brownlow Cecil, 4th Marquess of Exeter and Lord William Cecil were his elder brothers.

== Career ==
He was commissioned as a Lieutenant into the part-time 3rd (Northampton and Rutland Militia) Battalion, Northamptonshire Regiment (commanded by his father) on 13 May 1884. From there he obtained a Regular Army commission as a 2nd Lieutenant in the Grenadier Guards on 4 May 1887. He was promoted to Lieutenant on 16 March 1892 before retiring in 1897 and being commissioned as a Major in the 4th (Royal South Lincolnshire Militia) Battalion, Lincolnshire Regiment, commanded by his elder brother, Lord William Cecil. When Lord William retired, Cecil was promoted to Lieutenant-Colonel and took command of the battalion on 25 October 1902. He remained in command, with the personal rank of Honorary Colonel, until the battalion was disbanded on 31 July 1908.

Joicey-Cecil was in early 1903 chosen as the Conservative party candidate to contest Stamford, after the incumbent William Younger indicated he wanted to step down at the next election. This did not take place until January 1906, when Joicey-Cecil was elected to the House of Commons for Stamford, a seat he held until the following January 1910 general election. In April 1910, he was appointed a deputy lieutenant of Lincolnshire.

He was called out of retirement during World War I and commanded the 8th (Reserve) Battalion, Wiltshire Regiment, from 1 January 1915 until it was disbanded on 1 September 1916, when he was transferred to command 1st (Home Service) Garrison Battalion, Berkshire Regiment, and its successor, 14th Battalion, Royal Defence Corps.

== Personal life ==
On 15 September 1896, he married Isabella Maud Joicey, daughter of Colonel John Joicey, and assumed the additional surname of Joicey. Together, they were the parents of:

- John Francis James Joicey-Cecil (1897–1916)
- Isabella Rosamond Georgiana Joicey-Cecil (1901–1941)
- Maud Letitia Mary Joicey-Cecil (1906–1975)
- Edward Wilfred George Joicey-Cecil (1912–1985)

He died in June 1942, aged 75.

== See also ==
- Marquess of Exeter

Parliament of the United Kingdom
Preceded by William Younger	Member of Parliament for Stamford; 1906 – January 1910	Succeeded by Claud Heathcote-Drummond-Willoughby
