= Matt Ellson =

English footballer (1890–1958)

Personal information
- Full name: Merton Frederick Ellson
- Date of birth: 10 July 1890
- Place of birth: Thrapston, England
- Date of death: 1958 (aged 67–68)
- Position: Inside forward

Senior career*
Years	Team	Apps	(Gls)
1919–1920	Frickley Colliery		
1920–1922	Leeds United	37	(8)
1922	Frickley Colliery		
1922–1924	Halifax Town	23	(6)
Total		60	(14)
- * Club domestic league appearances and goals

Merton Frederick Ellson (10 July 1890 – 1958) was an English footballer who played in the Football League for Halifax Town and Leeds United.
