= Augustus Stafford =

British landowner and Conservative politician

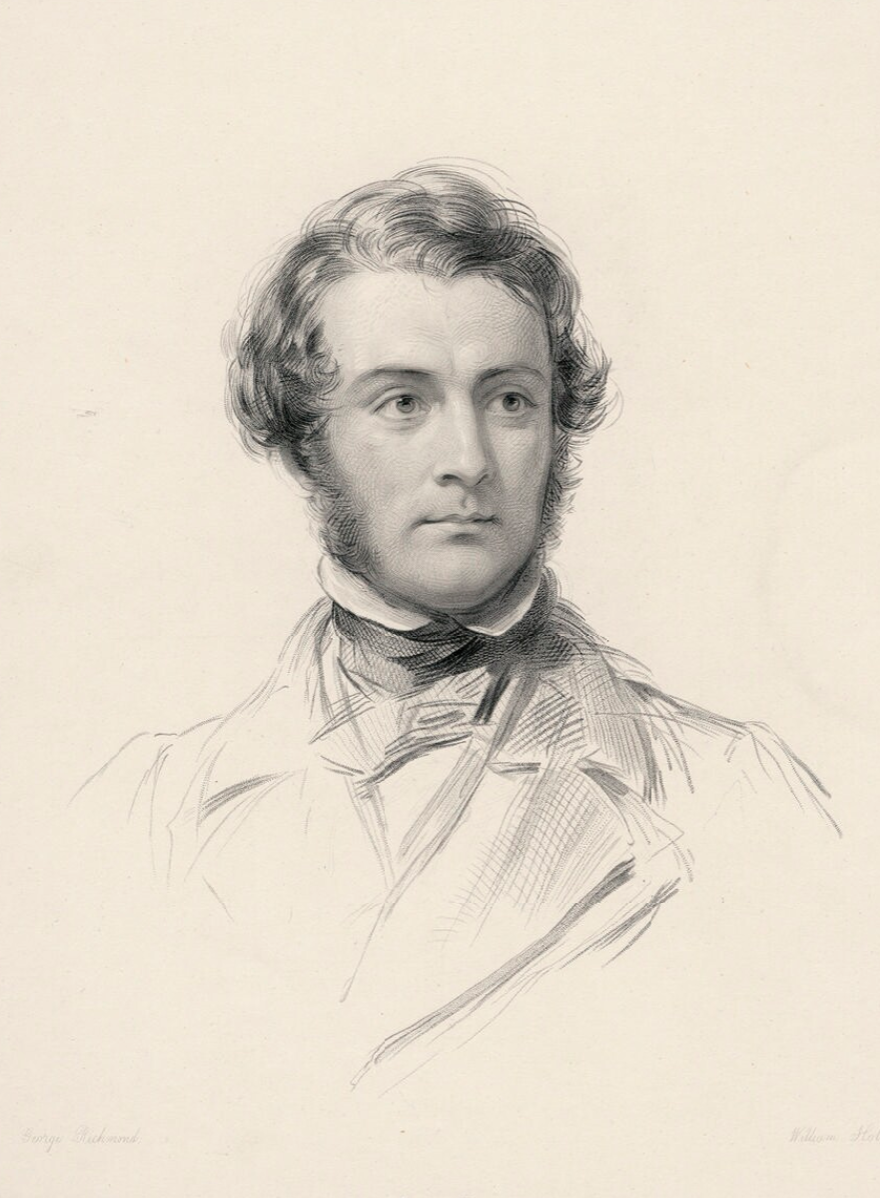
Augustus Stafford

Augustus Stafford (22 June 1811 – 15 November 1857), also known as Augustus Stafford O'Brien-Stafford, was a British landowner and Conservative Party politician.

== Biography ==
Stafford was born in Walcot, Lincolnshire in 1811. He was the son of Stafford O'Brien and his wife Emma, daughter of Sir Gerard Noel, 2nd Baronet. His name initially was Augustus Stafford O'Brien.

He sat as a member of parliament for Northamptonshire North from 1841 until his early death in 1857. He was Secretary to the Admiralty under the Duke of Northumberland in Lord Derby's 1852 government.

He was an active member of the Canterbury Association which he joined on 27 March 1848. He died on 15 November 1857 in Dublin, Ireland.

Parliament of the United Kingdom
Preceded by Viscount Maidstone and Thomas Philip Maunsell	Member of Parliament for Northamptonshire North; 1841–1857; With: Thomas Philip Maunsell	Succeeded by Lord Burghley and George Ward Hunt
Political offices
Preceded by John Parker	First Secretary of the Admiralty; 1852	Succeeded by Ralph Bernal Osborne
