= Arthur Peel, 2nd Earl Peel =

British peer (1901-1969)

The Right Honourable The Earl Peel

Member of the House of Lords
- Lord Temporal
- In office 8 September 1937 – 22 September 1969
- Preceded by: The 1st Earl Peel
- Succeeded by: The 3rd Earl Peel

Personal details
- Born: 29 May 1901
- Died: 22 September 1969 (aged 68)
- Spouse: Kathleen McGrath (m. 1946)
- Children: William, Robert
- Parent: William Peel, 1st Earl Peel (father)
- Other titles: 3rd Viscount Peel; 7th Baronet (of Drayton Manor and Bury)

Arthur William Ashton Peel, 2nd Earl Peel (29 May 1901 – 22 September 1969), styled Viscount Clanfield from 1929 to 1937, was a British peer.

Peel was the son of William Peel, 1st Earl Peel, by the Honourable Eleanor "Ella" Williamson, daughter of James Williamson, 1st Baron Ashton. He was a great-grandson of Prime Minister Robert Peel. He became known by the courtesy title Viscount Clanfield when his father was elevated to an earldom in 1929. In 1937 he succeeded in the earldom on the death of his father.

He succeeded to the family baronetcy in 1942 on the death of the 6th baronet, his second cousin once removed. In 1948 he was appointed Lord-Lieutenant of Lancashire, a post he held until 1951. Lord Peel married Kathleen McGrath, daughter of Michael McGrath, on 11 March 1946. They had two sons. He died in September 1969, aged 68, and was succeeded by his eldest son, William.

Honorary titles
Preceded by The 17th Earl of Derby	Lord Lieutenant of Lancashire; 1948–1951	Succeeded by The 18th Earl of Derby
Peerage of the United Kingdom
Preceded by William Peel	Earl Peel; 1937–1969; Member of the House of Lords (1937–1969)	Succeeded by William Peel
Preceded by William Peel	Viscount Peel; 1937–1969	Succeeded by William Peel
Baronetage of Great Britain
Preceded by Sir Robert Peel	Baronet of Drayton Manor and Bury; 1942–1969	Succeeded by William Peel
