= Tansor =

Village in Northamptonshire, England

Coordinates: 52.5073°N 0.4476°W

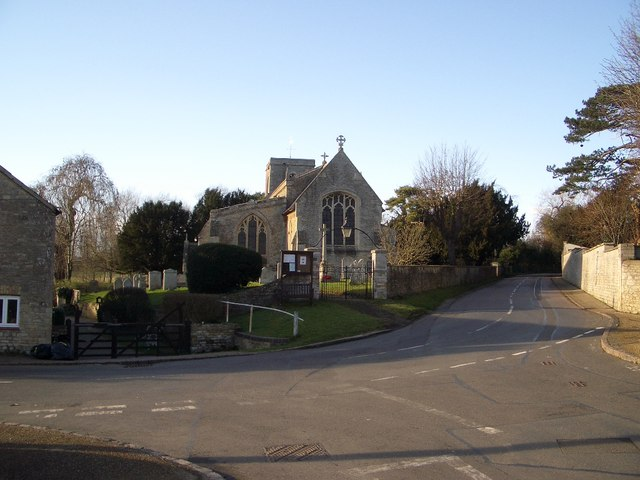
- The Church of St Mary the Virgin at Tansor

- Location within Northamptonshire
- Population: 172 (2011)
- OS grid reference: TL054910
- Unitary authority: North Northamptonshire
- Ceremonial county: Northamptonshire
- Region: East Midlands
- Country: England
- Sovereign state: United Kingdom
- Post town: Peterborough
- Postcode district: PE8
- Dialling code: 01832
- Police: Northamptonshire
- Fire: Northamptonshire
- Ambulance: East Midlands
- UK Parliament: Corby and East Northamptonshire

Tansor is a village and civil parish in the English county of Northamptonshire. Lying near the River Nene, three miles north-east of the town of Oundle and a mile from the village of Cotterstock, Tansor forms part of North Northamptonshire. At the time of the 2001 census, the parish's population was 185 people, reducing to 172 at the 2011 Census. Attractions are limited; only a church, telephone box and a village hall containing a playgroup. The Church of St Mary the Virgin is Grade II* listed.

The village's name origin is dubious. 'Tan's ridge' or maybe, 'Tan's river bank'. On the other hand, Old English 'tan' may be utilized in the moved feeling of the part of a stream with a 'river bank'.

A notable son of Tansor was the naturalist and writer Horace William Wheelwright, born there in 1815.
