= Thrapston =

Town in Northamptonshire, England

Coordinates: 52.397°N 0.538°W

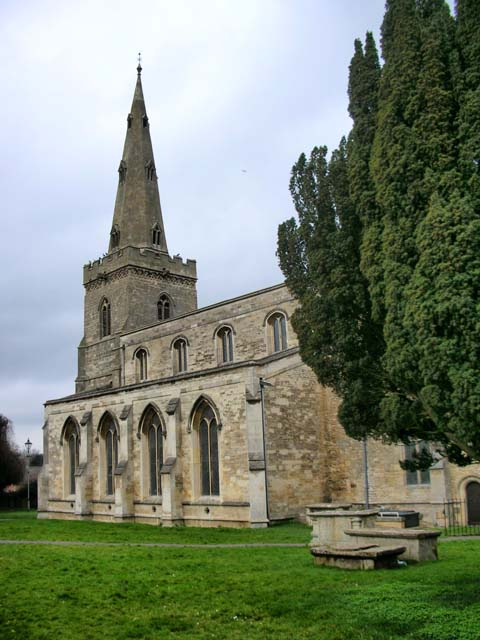
- Church of St James, Thrapston

- Location within Northamptonshire
- Population: 7,238 (2021 census)
- OS grid reference: SP997784
- Unitary authority: North Northamptonshire
- Ceremonial county: Northamptonshire
- Region: East Midlands
- Country: England
- Sovereign state: United Kingdom
- Post town: KETTERING
- Postcode district: NN14
- Dialling code: 01832
- Police: Northamptonshire
- Fire: Northamptonshire
- Ambulance: East Midlands
- UK Parliament: Corby and East Northamptonshire

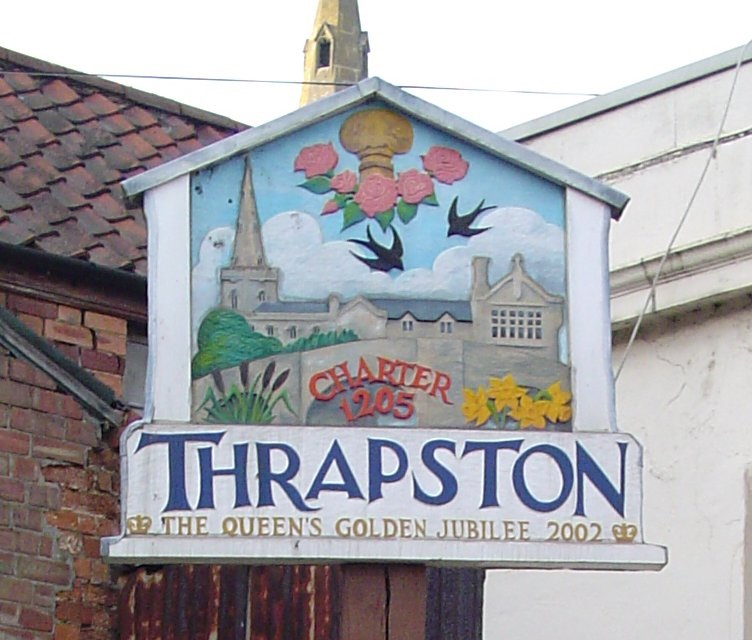
Town Sign

Thrapston is a market town and civil parish in the North Northamptonshire unitary authority area of Northamptonshire, England. It was the headquarters of the former East Northamptonshire district, and at the time of the 2021 census, had a population of 7,238.

The town's name means 'Farmstead or town of a man named Thraepst'. Another source suggests the individual name is related with Old Germanic 'Trapsta', 'Trafstila' and 'thrafstjan' meaning 'to comfort:, henceforth 'farmstead or town of a man named Draefst or Draepst'.

Thrapston is situated close to the River Nene, where the pronunciation changes from nene to neen and is at the junction of the A14 and the A45. Until the 1960s, Thrapston had two railway stations. Thrapston (Midland) was on the Kettering to Cambridge route, and the former station and viaduct can be seen from the adjacent A14 road. Thrapston (Bridge Street) was on the former LNWR Northampton to Peterborough line.

A market charter was granted to the town in 1205, in exchange for two palfreys. This is celebrated every year with the town's Charter fair, when the high street is closed and the townspeople congregate in commemoration. A relative of George Washington, Sir John Washington, lived in Chancery Lane in the town, and his wife is buried in the Church of St James. Sir John was brother to George Washington's great-grandfather. Naturalist and writer Horace William Wheelwright practised as an attorney in Thrapston in the 1840s. The Corn Exchange, on the north side of the High Street, was completed in 1850. Thrapston had two schools, Thrapston Primary and King John Middle School, which together served children from Nursery to Year 8. However, in 2015, East Northamptonshire switched to a two-tier school system resulting in the middle schools closing. As King John School closed, Thrapston Primary School expanded into the King John building, in order to accommodate the year 5 and 6 children. Following this, children usually go to Prince William school in Oundle or another school in the area from year 7 onwards.

The local authorities that cover different aspects of civic life in Thrapston are Thrapston Town Council, and North Northamptonshire Council.

== Notable residents ==
- Matt Ellson, footballer
- Henry de Thrapston (died c.1333), English-born judge and Chancellor of the Exchequer of Ireland
- John Hindhaugh, motorsport and media presenter
