= Northampton and Rutland Militia =

Auxiliary unit of the British Army

Northampton & Rutland Militia 3rd (Reserve) Bn, Northamptonshire Regiment
- Active: 1 October 1860–April 1953
- Country: United Kingdom
- Branch: Militia/Special Reserve
- Role: Infantry
- Size: 1–2 Battalions
- Part of: Northamptonshire Regiment
- Garrison/HQ: Northampton

Commanders
- Notable commanders: William Cecil, 3rd Marquess of Exeter

The Northampton and Rutland Militia was an auxiliary unit formed in 1860 by the merger of the militia regiments of Northamptonshire and Rutlandshire in the East Midlands of England. The regiment trained regularly in peacetime and served during periods of international tension and major wars, relieving regular troops from routine garrison duties. It became a battalion of the Northamptonshire Regiment in 1881, serving in the Second Boer War and training thousands of officers and men during World War I. After a shadowy postwar existence, it was finally disbanded in 1953.

== Organisation and training ==
After a long period in virtual abeyance, the Militia of the United Kingdom was revived by the Militia Act 1852, enacted during a period of international tension. Units were raised and administered on a county basis, and filled by voluntary enlistment (although conscription by means of the Militia Ballot might be used if the counties failed to meet their quotas). Training was for 56 days on enlistment, then for 21–28 days per year, during which the men received full army pay. Under the Act, militia units could be embodied by Royal Proclamation for full-time home defence service in three circumstances:

1. 'Whenever a state of war exists between Her Majesty and any foreign power'.
2. 'In all cases of invasion or upon imminent danger thereof'.
3. 'In all cases of rebellion or insurrection'.

The Northamptonshire Militia and the Rutland Light Infantry Militia were accordingly reorganised and resumed regular training. The Northamptonshire Militia saw garrison service in Ireland and Gibraltar during the Crimean War, being awarded the Battle honour Mediterranean. It was also embodied for Home Service during the Indian Mutiny. By 1860 there was a policy of amalgamating small county militia units with their neighbours to form more efficient regiments. This was done with the two-company Rutland Light Infantry, which amalgamated with the Northamptonshires on 1 October 1860 to form the Northampton and Rutland Militia, under the command of Lieutenant-Colonel Commandant Lord Burghley, with regimental headquarters at Northampton.

Militia battalions now had a large cadre of permanent staff (about 30) and a number of the officers were former Regulars. Around a third of the recruits and many young officers went on to join the Regular Army. The Militia Reserve introduced in 1867 consisted of present and former militiamen who undertook to serve overseas in case of war.

The combined regiment began its first training in May 1861, which culminated in a field day at Hunsbury Hill on 17 June under the command of Lord Burghley whose father the Marquess of Exeter, as Lord Lieutenant of Northamptonshire and of Rutland, inspected the regiment. Similarly, the 1862 training and inspection was at Wootton House, while in 1863 it was held in the field behind the regimental stores at Northampton. In 1864 the regiment participated in a brigade field day at Dallington alongside a squadron of the 8th Hussars, and two rifle companies and a troop of mounted volunteers of the 1st Administrative Battalion, Northamptonshire Rifle Volunteer Corps (RVCs). The 1865 training coincided with an outbreak of smallpox in Northampton town, and the whole regiment was vaccinated on the first day of training; the only man to refuse vaccination was the adjutant, who subsequently contracted the disease and had to be isolated for six week. During the training the men camped behind the Cavalry Barracks instead of being billeted on private houses. The camp was flooded by heavy rain and the men were billeted once more the following year.

The combined field day was repeated at the end of the annual training in 1868, at Earl Spencer's Althorp Park, when the Northampton & Rutland formed two temporary battalions, one commanded by Lord Burghley (now 3rd Marquess of Exeter) the other under his brother and second-in-command, Major Lord Brownlow Cecil, a former officer of the Scots Fusilier Guards. The other units present were a battery of Royal Horse Artillery, a detachment of the Rifle Brigade and the Northamptonshire RVCs. In 1869 the Northampton & Rutland regiment was brigaded with militia units from surrounding counties for a review in the Duke of Bedford's Woburn Park. The following year the brigade field day was held at Northampton Racecourse, with the Leicestershire Militia and Regular detachments from Weedon Barracks. The Northampton & Rutlands paraded 931 strong, and once again the left wing under Maj Lord Brownlow Cecil formed a temporary battalion; this was also done the following year. At that time the regiment had 164 men enrolled in the Militia Reserve, and also supplied 70 recruits to the Regulars. Between 1860 and 1872 the regiment supplied 490 men to regiments of the line.

== Cardwell and Childers reforms ==
Under the 'Localisation of the Forces' scheme introduced by the Cardwell Reforms of 1872, militia regiments were brigaded with their local Regular and Volunteer battalions. Sub-District No 29 (Counties of Northampton & Rutland) comprised:

- 48th (Northamptonshire) Regiment of Foot
- 58th (Rutlandshire) Regiment of Foot
- Northampton & Rutland Militia
- 1st Administrative Battalion, Northamptonshire Rifle Volunteer Corps
- Brigade Depot No 29 at the former Cavalry Barracks at Northampton, renamed Gibraltar Barracks

The intention of the Cardwell system was to have two militia battalions as reserves to each linked pair of regular battalions, and on 22 July 1874 the Northampton & Rutland Militia was divided into 1st and 2nd Battalions. 1st Battalion of 8 companies was commanded by the Marquess of Exeter (who held the personal honorary rank of Colonel), while Lord Brownlow Cecil was promoted to Lt-Col to command the 2nd Bn of 6 companies.

Following the Cardwell Reforms a mobilisation scheme began to appear in the Army List from December 1875. This assigned Regular and Militia units to places in an order of battle of corps, divisions and brigades for the 'Active Army', even though these formations were entirely theoretical, with no staff or services assigned. The Northampton & Rutland Militia were assigned to 1st Brigade of 2nd Division, VII Corps. The brigade would have mustered at Northampton in time of war.

The 1877 inspection report noted that the regiment was below establishment strength, but a determined recruiting effort brought in 767 recruits, who underwent their preliminary training in April 1878 ahead of the annual training in May. During this training a dispute in Northampton's Market Square on a Saturday led to a private being arrested by the police after a scuffle, in which the townsmen took his side. Next day false rumours that the prisoner had died led to a fullscale riot, with militiamen and townsmen stoning the police round the Judges' Lodgings, which acted as the officers' mess for the regiment. The Mayor swore in over 100 special constables who restored order. On the Monday the private was found guilty of theft by the magistrates, his fine being paid by one of his officers. However, that evening the rioting resumed while the Town Council was sitting and the special constables and 200 volunteers were deployed to protect the Town Hall, the Riot Act being read to the crowd. Next day a special court tried those who had been arrested, but the rioting resumed in the evening, reinforced by militiamen using their belts as weapons, and they had to be dispersed by the police. On the Wednesday another special court was held, and in the evening several companies of the regiment under their officers marched into the town centre to protect public buildings and patrol the streets. When the arrested militiamen were later tried their officer entered guilty pleas on their behalf and they were released on bail. At the end of the training the two battalions were inspected on the racecourse, when they were reported as being in good order, but with a very large number of men absent without leave. As well as the large number of recruits to deal with, the experienced militia reserve men had also been absent during this training, having been called out on 2 April as a precaution during the international crisis following the Russo-Turkish War. Of the 223 reservists in the Northampton & Rutlands, 213 presented themselves and 204 served at the depot until they were demobilised on 24 July.

=== 3rd & 4th Battalions, Northamptonshire Regiment ===
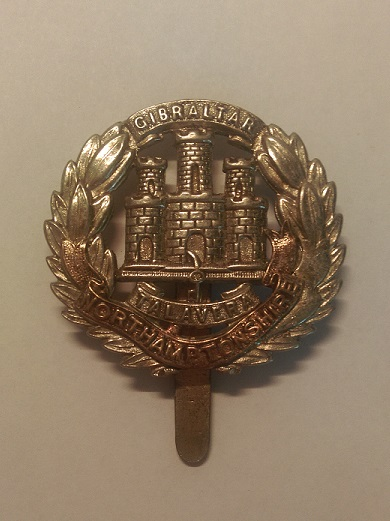
The Northamptonshire Regiment's cap badge.

The Childers Reforms of 1881 completed the Cardwell process by converting the linked regular regiments into two-battalion county regiments with two attached militia battalions. The 48th and 58th Foot became the 1st an 2nd Battalions of the Northamptonshire Regiment, with the militia battalions designated 3rd & 4th (Northampton and Rutland Militia) Battalions. The militia were also issued with the modern Martini–Henry rifle. In 1885 the Marquess of Exeter offered the regiment's services for garrison duty while many regular units were serving in the Sudan campaign, but the offer was declined. During the 1880s the number of recruits to the militia generally was falling, and in 1885 the two battalions of the Northampton & Rutlands were reduced from a total of 14 companies to 12, with a resulting reduction in the permanent staff.

In 1887 the 3rd Marquess of Exeter reached the end of his period of command, but was appointed to the vacant position of Honorary Colonel on his retirement. His eldest son, Lord Burghley was promoted from command of 3rd Bn to be Lt-Col Commandant of the regiment in 1889. At this time the Regular adjutant of the two battalions was Capt Alan Hill, who had won a Victoria Cross with the 1st Bn Northamptons during the First Boer War. Training continued on an annual basis, usually in April–May, until 1896, when for the first time it was carried out in the summer at Aldershot Camp rather than in Northamptonshire. Setting out by train from Northampton on 10 August the 3rd and 4th Bns camped at Rushmoor as part of the 3rd (Regular) Infantry Brigade. 4th Battalion returned to Northampton on 5 September, but 3rd Bn stayed on until 12 September, participating in the manoeuvres as part of 9th (Militia) Brigade of 5th Division, alongside the 3rd Royal West Surrey and the 3/4th East Surrey. Col Lord Burghley had succeeded as 4th Marquess of Exeter in 1895; he died suddenly in April 1898 and Col Sackville Stopford-Sackville was promoted from command of 4th Bn to Lt-Col Cmndt of both battalions in time for that year's training. In view of the continued shortages of militia recruits, the War Office decided that the 3rd and 4th Bns should be amalgamated as a single battalion of eight companies (A–F from 3rd Bn, G & H from A & B of 4th Bn). This was carried out on 1 April 1899.

=== Second Boer War ===
When the bulk of the Regular Army was sent to South Africa at the outbreak of the Second Boer War, the Militia Reserve was called out as reinforcements, followed by the militia battalions for home defence. 3rd Northamptons were embodied from 4 January 1900 with a strength of 29 officers and 686 other ranks (ORs) under the command of Col Stopford-Sackville, and went to Barossa Barracks, Aldershot. After the disasters of Black Week, the militia were invited to volunteer for overseas service: out of 29 officers and 686 other ranks (ORs), only 1 officer and 29 ORs were unable to volunteer. However, the battalion was not required as a whole, though it sent several reinforcement drafts to the 2nd Bn in South Africa. It was stationed at Verne Citadel, Portland, from March until 5 December 1900, when it was disembodied. However, the guerrilla war dragged on, and the battalion was re-embodied on 17 March 1902 and went to Meanee Barracks, Colchester. This time its offer for foreign service was accepted and it embarked on 8–9 April with a strength of 25 officers and 656 ORs under the command of Col J. Hill, Col Stopford-Sackville having reached retirement age in 1901.

The battalion sailed on the troopships Harlech Castle and Manilla. The Harlech Castle arrived at Cape Town on 1 May with the bulk of the battalion, which immediately entrained for Victoria West Road and occupied a 40 miles (64 km) line of blockhouses from there to Carnarvon at right angles to the line of the railway. The detachment from the Manilla arrived at Victoria West on 7 May. The men spent their time strengthening the blockhouse line and carrying out rifle practice. However, the Treaty of Vereeniging to end the war was signed on 31 May, and in July and August the battalion concentrated at Victoria West and moved to Stellenbosch. On 3 September it embarked for England aboard the SS Scot at Cape Town, having suffered one fatal casualty and two accidental injuries during its deployment. It landed at Southampton on the morning of 20 September and entrained for Northampton where after a parade to distribute medals the battalion was disembodied the same day. For its service the battalion was awarded a second battle honour, South Africa, 1902, and all the officers and ORs who had participated received the Queen's South Africa Medal with clasps for 'South Africa 1902' and 'Cape Colony 1902'.

After this embodiment, training (at Colchester) was made voluntary in 1903. Normal training resumed at Landguard Camp, Felixstowe, in 1904, and at Little Brington in Northamptonshire thereafter.

== Special Reserve ==
After the Boer War, the future of the militia was called into question. There were moves to reform the Auxiliary Forces (Militia, Yeomanry and Volunteers) to take their place in the six Army Corps proposed by the Secretary of State for War, St John Brodrick. However, little of Brodrick's scheme was carried out. Under the more sweeping Haldane Reforms of 1908, the Militia was replaced by the Special Reserve (SR), a semi-professional force whose role was to provide reinforcement drafts for regular units serving overseas in wartime, rather like the earlier Militia Reserve.

The 3rd (Northampton & Rutland Militia) Bn transferred to the SR on 21 June 1908 as the 3rd (Reserve) Battalion, Northamptonshire Regiment. Over the following years, now command by the Earl of Westmorland, the battalion trained at Landguard Camp except in 1913 when it was at Shorncliffe Camp.

== World War I ==
=== 3rd (Reserve) Battalion ===
On the outbreak of World War I in August 1914 the 3rd (R) Bn was in its training camp at Felixstowe. The Earl of Westmorland having retired on 31 July, the battalion was now under the command of Lt-Col George Champion de Crespigny. (The Earl of Westmorland was later 'dug out' from retirement and became CO of the 3rd (R) Bn, Lancashire Fusiliers.) The 3rd Northamptons returned to Northampton, where they mobilised on 5 August, reservists and special reservists flooding into the depot be equipped. The left half of 3rd (R) Bn had to be housed in St George's School because the barracks were overflowing. On the night of 8 August the battalion entrained and proceeded to its war station at Portland Harbour.

At Portland the battalion carried out its twin roles of coast defence and preparing reinforcement drafts of reservists, special reservists, returning wounded and new recruits for the regular battalions of the regiment serving on the Western Front. The first draft of 200 men was prepared as soon as the 1st Northamptons embarked for France. At first the 3rd (R) Bn was billeted in local schools in Weymouth and employed in digging trenches, while reservists and new recruits flooded in. On 8 October it was ordered to form a new 8th Bn from the surplus men (see below). By mid-November the battalion had sent drafts of 1385 ORs to the fighting battalions.

On 17 November the 3rd (R) Northamptons, together with the 3rd (R) Royal Scots and 3rd (R) King's Own Scottish Borderers, entrained at Weymouth and proceeded to Sunderland. The battalion was housed in a school that had been hurriedly cleared of pupils, and was put to work erecting sandbag defences. The brigade's two-part defence scheme involved firstly attacking any attempted landing in their own area, and secondly in case of a landing in strength to evacuate the south side of the river and docks, fall back to prepared positions at the 'Red House' and prepare a third line of defence on the north side. The troops practised taking up these positions. The vulnerability of the North East coast was emphasised a month later when the Imperial German Navy carried out a Raid on Scarborough, Hartlepool and Whitby. The defenders at Sunderland were warned on 15 December, sentries were doubled and everyone was under arms at 06.30 next morning before the attacks began. The gun flashes of the ships bombarding Hartlepool could be seen from Seaham Point.

On 7 January 1915 the militia brigade returned from Sunderland to Weymouth, where the battalion resumed training the recruits passing through its ranks. By 22 April the battalion had sent 1447 reinforcements to the 1st Bn and 1337 to the 2nd. On 21 May 3rd (R) Bn left Weymouth and moved to Gillingham, Kent, and went under canvas at Twydall Camp. The area received a Zeppelin raid on 3 June. The battalion remained in the Thames and Medway Garrison for the rest of the war, moving into winter quarters at Strood in October 1915, before returning to Twydall Camp in March 1916. A series of German air raids on the Medway towns began in September 1917 and continued until the beginning of November; they then resumed in January 1918. During raids the troops were accommodated in the casemates of Fort Darland to avoid falling shrapnel from anti-aircraft fire. The Thames & Medway Brigade spent the early part of 1918 in a disused clay pit digging a replica of the mole at Zeebrugge so that the attacking force could practise on it before the Raid on Zeebrugge on 23 April. After the raid 3rd (R) Bn moved from Fort Darland to Scrapsgate Camp near Minster on the Isle of Sheppey.

Lieutenant-Col Champion de Crespigny retired from command of the battalion on 1 August 1918 and Maj Reginald Bentinck (a retired Indian Army officer) assumed temporary command. Just before the Armistice with Germany Lt-Col Herbert Metcalfe was appointed to the command. He was a former Regular officer of the Northamptons and Inspector of Musketry who had been Chief Constable of Somerset before the war. He rejoined 3rd (R) Bn as a major in December 1914 and after carrying out duties in the rear areas was sent in December 1917 to take command of 21st (Service) Battalion, Middlesex Regiment (Islington) in France. He had no battle experience and his brigadier thought he was too old, but during the bitter fighting of the German spring offensive he led the battalion with great distinction, winning two Distinguished Service Orders before being wounded.

After the Armistice, 3rd (R) Bn continued to send drafts to the Western Front as demobilisation of the British Expeditionary Force got under way, and began education classes to prepare men for civilian life. In February 1919 it moved from Scrapsgate Camp to Sunbury-on-Thames where it camped at Kempton Park Racecourse. Then in March moved back to Sheerness on Sheppey before going to the Cannock Chase training area, first at Rugeley and then Brocton. The Irish War of Independence had broken out in January and reinforcements were required there: in early April the battalion was placed on 12 hours' notice to move. This was carried out on 13 April, the troops going by train to Holyhead and then by sea to Kingstown, arriving at Curragh Camp early the following morning. Lieutenant-Col Metcalfe was demobilised in May and the command went to Lt-Col Leonard Dobbin (a Regular officer of the Northamptons who had been the adjutant of 3rd (R) Bn 1908–12). The battalion, reduced by demobilisation to just 300 men, moved to Richmond Barracks, Templemore, on 3 July, where detachments were sent out to Birr, Cashel, Nenagh and Thurles to assist the Royal Irish Constabulary in civil policing. Lieutenant-Col Dobbin handed command back to Maj Bentick. Finally, the cadre of 1st Northamptons arrived at Templemore from the depot and on 14 August absorbed the remaining personnel of 3rd (R) Bn who were not set for immediate demobilisation. The latter battalion was formally demobilised on 30 August, the cadre under Maj Bentinck arriving at Northampton on 7 September.

=== 8th (Reserve) Battalion ===
After Lord Kitchener issued his call for volunteers in August 1914, the battalions of the 1st, 2nd and 3rd New Armies ('K1', 'K2' and 'K3' of 'Kitchener's Army') were quickly formed at the regimental depots. The SR battalions also swelled with new recruits and were soon well above their establishment strength. Each SR battalion was ordered to use the surplus to form a service battalion of the 4th New Army ('K4'). Accordingly, the 3rd (Reserve) Bn at Weymouth formed the 8th (Service) Bn, Northamptonshire Regiment on 16 September, which became part of 103rd Brigade in 34th Division and began training for active service. Brevet Col Edward Hartigan, a retired Indian Army officer was appointed CO on 8 November. By January 1915 the battalion was at Penzance in Cornwall. In the spring of 1915 the WO decided to convert the K4 battalions into 2nd Reserve units, providing drafts for the K1–K3 battalions in the same way that the SR was doing for the Regular battalions. On 10 April 1915 the 8th Northamptons became 8th (Reserve) Battalion, and in May it went to Colchester Garrison where 6th Reserve Brigade was assembling. 8th (R) Battalion trained drafts for the 5th, 6th and 7th, 8th (Service) Bns of the regiment serving on the Western Front. (In January 1916 it also sent a draft of 300 ORs to the 10th (Service) Battalion, Queens (Royal West Surrey Regiment) (Battersea)). In March 1916 the battalion moved to Sittingbourne in Kent. Lieutenant-Col Edward Sharpe from the Middlesex Regiment took over as CO on 17 June 1916.

On 1 September 1916 the 2nd Reserve battalions were transferred to the Training Reserve (TR) and the 8th Northamptons was redesignated as 28th Training Reserve Bn in 6th Reserve Brigade. The training staff retained their Northampton badges. On 4 July 1917 it was redesignated 254th (Infantry) Bn, TR, and joined 208th Brigade in 69th (2nd East Anglian) Division at Thoresby Camp in Nottinghamshire. On 27 October 1917 it became 51st (Graduated) Bn of the Queen's (Royal West Surrey Regiment). By January 1918 it was in winter quarters at Sheffield in Yorkshire. In April it left 69th Division and briefly moved to 192nd Bde in 64th Division at Norwich in Norfolk before moving on again. By July 1918 it was in 204th Bde, 68th Division, at Bury St Edmunds in Suffolk, where it remained until after the Armistice.

Early in 1919 the training battalions were converted into service battalions to replace demobilising troops in the British Army of the Rhine. On 8 February the battalion became 51st (Service) Bn, Queen's and went to Germany where on 1 April it was absorbed into 10th (Service) Battalion, Queens (Royal West Surrey Regiment) (Battersea) in 101st Brigade of Eastern Division (the same battalion that had been reinforced by the 8th Northamptons in January 1916).

=== Postwar ===
The SR resumed its old title of Militia in 1921 and then became the Supplementary Reserve in 1924, but like most militia battalions the 3rd Northamptons remained in abeyance after World War I. Lieutenant-Col Metcalfe was officially in command as late as 1924, but by the outbreak of World War II in 1939 no officers remained listed for the battalion. (However, the Northamptonshire Regiment did have a number of Supplementary Reserve officers Category B attached to it.) The Militia was formally disbanded in April 1953.

== Commanders ==
Commanding officers of the regiment included:

Honorary Colonels

- Thomas Maunsell, appointed 26 June 1854 (from Northamptonshire Militia), died 1866
- William Cecil, 3rd Marquess of Exeter, former CO, appointed 20 October 1887, died 1895
- Sackville Stopford-Sackville, former CO, appointed 2 January 1901

Lieutenant-Colonels Commandant

- Col William Cecil, 3rd Marquess of Exeter, appointed 7 January 1846 (from Northamptonshire Militia) – later 1st and then 3rd Bn, retired 1887
- Col Brownlow Cecil, 4th Marquess of Exeter, appointed (from 3rd Bn) Lt-Col Cmdt 23 March 1889, died 9 April 1898
- Col Sackville Stopford-Sackville appointed (from 4th Bn) 18 May 1898, retired 9 March 1901
- Col Joseph Hill, CB, appointed (from 3rd Bn) 9 March 1901, retired 31 July 1907

Lieutenant-Colonels
3rd Battalion

- Brownlow Cecil, 4th Marquess of Exeter, formerly captain, Grenadier Guards, promoted 3 December 1887
- Joseph Hill, appointed 18 May 1898, promoted 9 March 1901
- Anthony Fane, 13th Earl of Westmorland, promoted 31 July 1907, retired 31 July 1914
- George Champion de Crespigny, promoted 1 August 1914, retired 1 August 1918
- Herbert Metcalfe, DSO*, appointed 2 November 1918

4th Battalion

- Lord Brownlow Cecil, appointed (2nd Bn) 22 July 1874, promoted 26 October 1887
- Lord Burghley (later 4th Marquess of Exeter) appointed 3 December 1887, promoted April 1889
- Sackville Stopford-Sackville, appointed 13 April 1889, promoted 18 May 1898

8th Battalion

- Col Edward Hartigan, formerly Indian Army, appointed 8 November 1914
- Edward Sharpe, formerly Middlesex Regiment, appointed 17 June 1916

== Heritage & ceremonial ==
Collar badge and 'crest' of the Northamptonshire Regiment, based on the insignia of the Northampton & Rutland Militia.

=== Uniforms & insignia ===
The regiment's uniform from 1860 was red with buff facings. The Shako plate consisted of a crowned cut star, at the centre of which was St George's cross surrounded by a garter. Above the garter was a scroll inscribed 'NORTHAMPTONSHIRE' and another below with '& RUTLAND MILITIA'. At the bottom was an inverted horseshoe, the traditional badge of Rutlandshire. The tunic buttons and officers' waistbelt plates had the horseshoe in the centre of St George's Cross, the whole within a circle inscribed with the regimental name. When the militia battalions joined the Northamptonshire Regiment in 1881, their facings changed to white and the officers' silver lace to gold as in the regulars, but all the battalions of the new regiment adopted the militia's Garter cross and horseshoe as a collar and belt badge in addition to the regulars' 'Gibraltar' cap badge.

The militia regiment formed in 1860 continued with the Northamptonshire's 48th place in the militia order of precedence (losing the Rutlands' higher precedence of 14) but did not show the numeral on its insignia other than on the Regimental colours that had been issued to the Northamptons in 1855. Colours were presented to the 2nd Battalion in 1876. When new colours were issued to the 3rd Northamptons in 1887 the old colours were laid up in the great hall at the Marquess of Exeter's Burghley House.

=== Memorial ===
There is a stone tablet in the porch of Northampton Guildhall to commemorate the service of the 3rd Battalion in the Second Boer War, 17 March–20 September 1902. It lists the names of the officers and warrant officers who served.

=== Battle honours ===
The regiment's colours bore the following Battle honours awarded for its overseas service in In the Crimean and Second Boer Wars.

- Mediterranean
- South Africa 1902

These were rescinded in 1910 when the SR battalions assumed the same honours as their parent regiments.

== See also ==
- Militia (United Kingdom)
- Special Reserve
- Northampton Militia
- Rutland Militia
- Northamptonshire Regiment
