= Stirling baronets of Faskine (1800) =

Escutcheon of the Stirling baronets of Faskine

The Stirling baronetcy, of Faskine, parish of Old Monkland in Lanarkshire, was created on 15 December 1800) in the Baronetage of Great Britain for the banker and politician Walter Stirling. He was Member of Parliament for Gatton, Surrey from 1799 to 1802 and St. Ives from 1807 to 1820. The son of the naval officer Walter Stirling, who had declined a baronetcy, he lobbied William Pitt the younger for the title for himself; his mother Dorothy Willing was a daughter of Charles Willing of Philadelphia.

The grant was the final baronetcy in the Baronetage of Great Britain. The title became extinct on the death in 1934 of the 3rd Baronet.

== Stirling baronets of Faskine (1800) ==
- Sir Walter Stirling, 1st Baronet (1758–1832)
- Sir Walter George Stirling, 2nd Baronet (1802–1888)
- Sir Walter George Stirling, 3rd Baronet (1839–1934), left no male heir.

== Notes ==
Baronetage of Great Britain
Preceded by Peel baronets	Stirling baronets of Faskine; 15 December 1800	Succeeded by Baronetage of the United Kingdom
