= Lady Delia Peel =

English courtier (1889–1981)

Lady Delia Peel DCVO
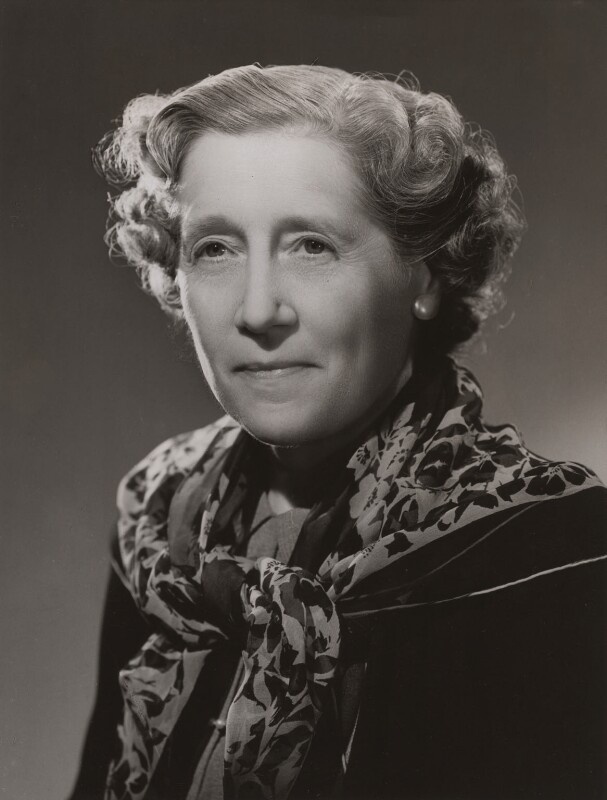
- Lady Delia Peel in 1946
- Born: Adelaide Margaret Spencer; 26 June 1889; London, England
- Died: 16 January 1981 (aged 91); Barton Turf, Norfolk, England
- Spouse: Sir Sidney Peel (m. 1914; died 1938)
- Father: Charles Spencer, 6th Earl Spencer
- Relatives: Diana, Princess of Wales (grandniece)
- Family: Spencer

Lady Adelaide "Delia" Margaret Peel DCVO (née Spencer; 26 June 1889 – 16 January 1981) was an English courtier and member of the Spencer family.

== Early life ==
She was born in London, the eldest child of the 6th Earl Spencer and Hon. Margaret Baring, daughter of Edward Baring, 1st Baron Revelstoke. Her mother died in childbirth in 1906 during the birth of her sister Lady Margaret Douglas-Home. Delia studied at the Royal College of Music and played the piano and cello.

== Career ==
Following her husband's death in 1938, she became Woman of the Bedchamber, a lady-in-waiting to Queen Elizabeth from 1939 until 1952.

She was active with the Girl Guides, the Women's Institute, and county choirs. She was created Commander of the Royal Victorian Order in the 1947 Birthday Honours, and Dame Commander of the same order in 1950.

== Personal life ==
On 18 February 1914 at Althorp, she married the Hon. Sidney Peel, third son of the Arthur Peel, 1st Viscount Peel, Speaker of the House of Commons and grandson of Prime Minister Sir Robert Peel. Her father gifted her a tiara studded with 800 diamonds as a wedding present.

They had no children, but she adopted her husband's nephew David, after his father, Hon. Maurice Berkeley Peel, was killed in 1917 in the First World War. Maj. David Arthur Peel was killed in the Second World War while serving with the Irish Guards.

== Death and legacy ==
She died aged 91 at her home in Barton Turf, Norfolk.

In 1984, Priscilla Napier published a biography, A Memoir of the Lady Delia Peel, born Spencer, 1889–1981.
