= Sackville Stopford-Sackville =

British politician

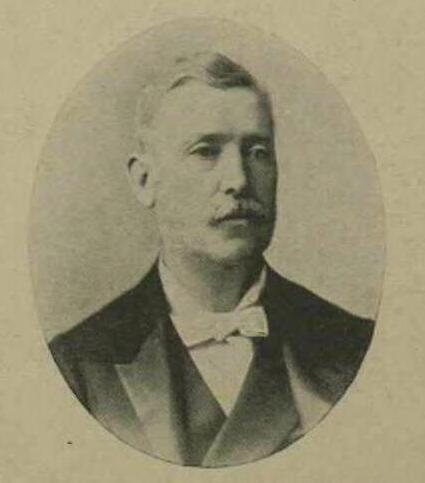
- Born: 19 March 1840
- Died: 6 October 1926 (aged 86)
- Spouse(s): Edith Frances Rashleigh
- Parent(s): William Stopford Sackville; Caroline Sackville
- Position held: member of the 27th Parliament of the United Kingdom (1900–1906), member of the 21st Parliament of the United Kingdom (1874–1880), member of the 20th Parliament of the United Kingdom (1868–1874), member of the 19th Parliament of the United Kingdom (1867–1868)

Sackville George Stopford-Sackville DL, JP (19 March 1840 – 6 October 1926), known as Sackville Stopford until 1870, was a British Conservative politician.

== Background and education ==
Born Sackville Stopford, Stopford-Sackville was the eldest son of William Stopford-Sackville, son of Reverend the Hon. Richard Bruce Stopford, younger son of James Stopford, 2nd Earl of Courtown. His mother was Caroline Harriett, daughter and heiress of the Hon. George Sackville, younger son of George Germain, 1st Viscount Sackville. He assumed in 1870 (alongside his father) by Royal licence the additional surname of Sackville. Through his mother he inherited Drayton House, Lowick, Northamptonshire. He was educated at Christ Church, Oxford.

== Military career ==
He was commissioned as a Lieutenant in the part-time Northampton and Rutland Militia on 8 February 1862, and was promoted to Captain on 22 June 1868 and Major on 29 December 1883, by which time the regiment had become the 3rd and 4th Battalions of the Northamptonshire Regiment. He was appointed commanding officer of the 4th Battalion on 13 April 1889 with the rank of Lieutenant-Colonel; he was later given the personal honorary rank of Colonel. On 18 May 1898 he was promoted to Lt-Col Commandant of the 3rd and 4th Bns (though they amalgamated shortly afterwards). The Militia was embodied for home defence during the Second Boer War, and on 4 January 1900 Stopford-Sackville mobilised the 3rd Northamptons and took them to Barossa Barracks, Aldershot. Almost the whole battalion volunteered for overseas service, but their offer was not taken up. From March the battalion garrisoned Verne Citadel, Portland, until 5 December 1900, when it was disembodied. Stopford-Sackville reached retirement age in 1901, and therefore missed the battalion's deployment to South Africa in the last stages of the war in 1902; however, he was appointed its Honorary Colonel on 2 January 1901, a position that he retained for the rest of his life.

== Political career ==
Stopford-Sackville was returned to Parliament for Northamptonshire North in 1867, a seat he held until 1880. He remained out of the House of Commons for the next twenty years trying unsuccessfully to return to parliament in the 1894 Wisbech by-election. In 1900 he was re-elected for his previous constituency Northamptonshire North, and continued to represent it until 1906. He was also an Alderman of the Northamptonshire County Council and served as a Deputy Lieutenant and Justice of the Peace of that county.

== Family ==
Stopford-Sackville married Edith Frances, daughter of William Rashleigh, in 1875. There were no children from the marriage. She died in December 1905. Sackville-Stopford survived her by over twenty years and died on 6 October 1926, aged 86. There were no children of the marriage.

A reredos was installed in his memory in St Peter's Church, Lowick.

== See also ==
- Earl of Courtown
- Viscount Sackville

Parliament of the United Kingdom
Preceded by Lord Burghley; George Ward Hunt	Member of Parliament for Northamptonshire North; 1867–1880; With: George Ward Hunt 1867–1877; Lord Burghley 1877–1880	Succeeded by Lord Burghley; Hon. Charles Spencer
Preceded by Edward Philip Monckton	Member of Parliament for Northamptonshire North; 1900–1906	Succeeded by George Nicholls
