= William Cecil, 3rd Marquess of Exeter =

British peer and Conservative politician

The Most Honourable The Marquess of Exeter PC
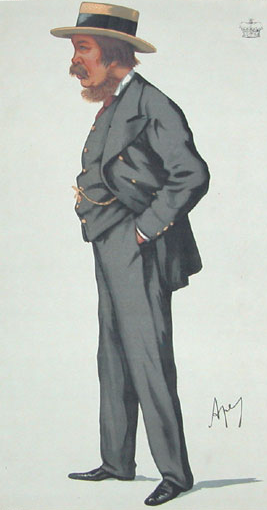
- The Marquess of Exeter by Carlo Pellegrini, 1881.

Captain of the Gentlemen-at-Arms
- In office 20 March 1867 – 1 December 1868
- Monarch: Victoria
- Prime Minister: The Earl of Derby; Benjamin Disraeli
- Preceded by: The Earl of Tankerville
- Succeeded by: The Lord Foley

Personal details
- Born: 30 April 1825
- Died: 14 July 1895 (aged 70)
- Party: Conservative
- Spouse: Lady Georgina Pakenham (m. 1849; died 1895)
- Children: Brownlow Cecil, 4th Marquess of Exeter; Lord Francis Cecil; Lord William Cecil; Catherine Vane, Baroness Barnard; Col. Lord John Joicey-Cecil; Lady Isabella Battie-Wrightson; Mary Hozier, Baroness Newlands; Lady Louisa Cecil; Lady Frances Cecil
- Parent(s): Brownlow Cecil, 2nd Marquess of Exeter; Isabella Poyntz

William Alleyne Cecil, 3rd Marquess of Exeter PC (30 April 1825 – 14 July 1895), styled Lord Burghley between 1825 and 1867, was a British peer and Conservative politician. He served as Treasurer of the Household between 1866 and 1867 and as Captain of the Honourable Corps of Gentlemen-at-Arms between 1867 and 1868.

== Early life ==
Exeter was the eldest son of Brownlow Cecil, 2nd Marquess of Exeter, and his wife Isabella, daughter of William Stephen Poyntz, MP. He was educated at St. John's College, Cambridge, where he was president of the University Pitt Club.

== Cricket career ==
Exeter played for the Marylebone Cricket Club and Cambridge University between 1847 and 1851.

== Militia career ==
As Lord Lieutenant of Northamptonshire his father appointed him Lieutenant-Colonel of the disembodied Northampton Militia on 7 January 1846. When the regiment was revived in 1852 he became Lt-Col Commandant and continued in command when it became the Northampton and Rutland Militia in 1860 and later the 3rd Battalion, Northamptonshire Regiment in 1881. He finally retired on 23 October 1887, being succeeded in the command by his eldest son. He was appointed Honorary Colonel of the battalion and wrote its regimental history.

== Political career ==
Exeter was elected to the House of Commons for South Lincolnshire in 1847, a seat he held until 1857, and then represented North Northamptonshire from 1857 to 1867. He served under the Earl of Derby as Treasurer of the Household from 1866 to 1867, when he succeeded his father in the marquessate and entered the House of Lords.

In March 1867 Derby appointed him Captain of the Honourable Corps of Gentlemen-at-Arms, a post he held until December 1868, the last nine months under the premiership of Benjamin Disraeli. In 1866 he was admitted to the Privy Council.

== Personal life ==
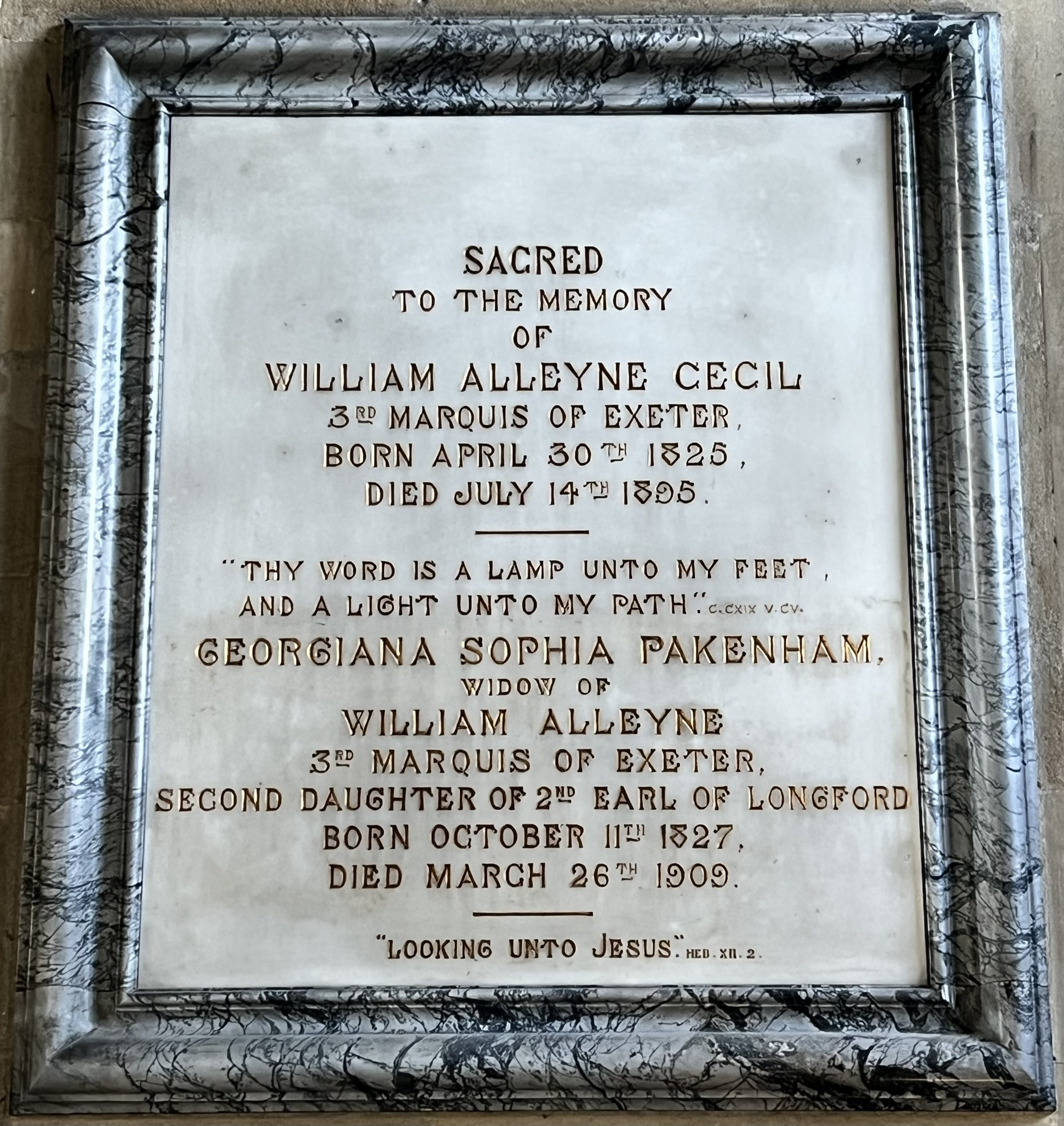
Memorial in St Martin's Church, Stamford

Lord Exeter married Lady Georgina Sophia Pakenham, daughter of Thomas Pakenham, 2nd Earl of Longford, on 17 October 1848. They had at least nine children:

- Brownlow Henry George Cecil, 4th Marquess of Exeter (1849–1898), who married Isabella Whichcote, daughter of Sir Thomas Whichcote, 7th Baronet.
- Lord Francis Horace Pierrepont Cecil (1851–1889), who married Edith Brookes, daughter of Sir William Cunliffe Brooks, 1st Baronet.
- Lord William Cecil (1854–1943), who married Mary Cecil, 2nd Baroness Amherst of Hackney. After her death in 1919, he married Violet Freer in 1924.
- Lady Catherine Sarah Cecil (1861–1918), married Henry Vane, 9th Baron Barnard.
- Lord John Pakenham Joicey-Cecil (1867–1942), Lt-Col of the Lincolnshire Militia and MP for Stamford.
- Lady Isabella Georgiana Katherine Cecil (d. 1903), who married William Battie-Wrightson.
- Lady Mary Louisa Wellesley Cecil (d. 1930), who married James Hozier, 2nd Baron Newlands.
- Lady Louisa Alexandrina Cecil (d. 1950), who died unmarried.
- Lady Frances Emily Cecil (d. 1951), who died unmarried.

Lord Exeter died in July 1895, aged 70, and was succeeded in his titles by his eldest son Brownlow, who also became a government minister. The Marchioness of Exeter died in March 1909. Lady Angela Forbes wrote in her 1919 memoir, Memories and Base Details, of how she "[stood] in wholesome dread, in company, I may say, with her own family" of the formidable Marchioness. "Not to speak until you were spoken to, was a doctrine I did not at all appreciate, but one rigidly enforced at Burleigh! Prayers were read daily by Lady Exeter in the beautiful old chapel adjoining the house ... [on] one fatal occasion I giggled – and Lady Exeter stopped dead in the middle of a sentence, looking straight at me. 'When the wicked man turneth away from his wickedness' – and then there was a horrid pause. No notice was taken as we went out, but a little later a message came that 'her ladyship would like to see me.' My outward bravado was not in the least indicative of my feelings as I stood in front of her listening to a severe lecture couched in the most satirical language, whilst her two daughters stood, dragon-like, on either side of her."

He held 28,000 acres across England

== Arms ==
Coat of arms of William Cecil, 3rd Marquess of Exeter
Crest On a chapeau gules, turned up ermine, a garb or, supported by two Lions, the dexter argent, and the sinister azure. Escutcheon Barry of ten argent and azure over all six escutcheons sable, three, two, and one, each charged with a lion rampant of the first. Supporters On either side a lion ermine. Motto Cor unum via una (One heart, one way).

Parliament of the United Kingdom
Preceded by Christopher Turnor; Sir John Trollope, Bt	Member of Parliament for South Lincolnshire; 1847–1857; With: Sir John Trollope, Bt	Succeeded by Sir John Trollope, Bt; Anthony Wilson
Preceded by Thomas Philip Maunsell; Augustus O'Brien-Stafford	Member of Parliament for North Northamptonshire; 1857–1867; With: Augustus O'Brien-Stafford 1857; George Ward Hunt 1857–1867	Succeeded by George Ward Hunt; Sackville Stopford-Sackville
Political offices
Preceded by Lord Otho FitzGerald	Treasurer of the Household; 1866–1867	Succeeded by Hon. Percy Egerton Herbert
Preceded by The Earl of Tankerville	Captain of the Gentlemen-at-Arms; 1867–1868	Succeeded by The Lord Foley
Preceded by The Earl of Ilchester	Captain of the Gentlemen-at-Arms; 1874–1875	Succeeded by The Earl of Shrewsbury
Peerage of the United Kingdom
Preceded by Brownlow Cecil	Marquess of Exeter; 1867–1895	Succeeded by Brownlow Cecil
