= Horace William Wheelwright =

Horace William Wheelwright (5 January 1815 – 16 November 1865) was an English hunter, naturalist and writer who spent many years of his life in Australia and Sweden.

Wheelwright was born at Tansor, Northamptonshire. He was educated at Reading Grammar School and then studied law, practising as an attorney 1843–1846 at Thrapston, Northamptonshire. He later travelled extensively through northern Europe, especially Norway and Sweden.

About 1852, at the time of the Victorian gold rush, Wheelwright migrated to Australia. Unsuccessful at the diggings, he became a professional game shooter to supply the Melbourne market. The book he subsequently wrote about his Australian experiences, "Bush Wanderings of a Naturalist", is an important source of information about the natural history of the area around Melbourne in the 1850s.

Wheelwright eventually left Australia in the late 1850s to return to Europe, settling in Gårdsjö, in the province of Värmland, near Karlstad, Sweden. He died in London following a fall in the street, which aggravated a longstanding hernia condition, and the subsequent operation.

== Bibliography ==
- 1859 – Comparative list of the birds of Scandinavia and Great Britain 1859. C. Forssell: Karlstad, Sweden.
- 1861 – Bush Wanderings of a Naturalist; or, notes on the field sports and fauna of Australia Felix. Routledge, Warne & Routledge: London. (Written under the pseudonym of "An Old Bushman").
- 1864 – A Spring and Summer in Lapland, with notes on the fauna of Luleä Lapmark. Groombridge and Sons: London. (Written under the pseudonym of "An Old Bushman").
- 1865 – Sporting Sketches at Home and Abroad. Frederick Warne and Co: London. (Written under the pseudonym of "An Old Bushman").
