= North Northamptonshire (constituency) =

Parliamentary constituency in the United Kingdom, 1885–1918

- Former county constituency for the House of Commons
- County: Northamptonshire

1832–1918
- Seats: 1832–1885: Two; 1885–1918: One
- Created from: Northamptonshire and Higham Ferrers
- Replaced by: Wellingborough, Kettering and Peterborough

North Northamptonshire was a county constituency in Northamptonshire, represented in the House of Commons of the Parliament of the United Kingdom. This constituency included the majority of the Soke of Peterborough (also known as the 'Liberty of Peterborough'), with the exception of the actual city of Peterborough itself, which was a borough constituency that returned its own MP.

== Boundaries ==
1832–1885: The Liberty of Peterborough, and the Hundreds of Willybrook, Polebrook, Huxloe, Navisford, Corby, Higham Ferrers, Rothwell, Hamfordshoe and Orlingbury.

1885–1918: The Sessional Divisions of Oundle and Thrapstone, part of the Sessional Division of Kettering (with the exceptions below), the Liberty of the Soke of Peterborough, and the part of the Municipal Borough of Stamford in the county of Northamptonshire. (The part of the Sessional Division of Kettering included in North Northamptonshire excluded the parishes of Broughton, Cransley, Kettering and Pytchley, which were assigned to East Northamptonshire, and also excluded the parishes of Draughton, Faxton, Glendon, Harrington, Loddington, Mawsley, Orton, Rothwell and Thorpe Malsor, which were assigned to Mid Northamptonshire).

The constituency was created by the Great Reform Act for the 1832 general election, and abolished for the 1918 general election, when it was merged into Peterborough.

== Members of Parliament ==
From 1832 until 1885, the constituency returned two Members of Parliament elected by the bloc vote system. Under the Redistribution of Seats Act 1885, with effect from the 1885 general election, its area was reduced and representation reduced to one member, elected by the first past the post voting system.

=== 1832 - 1885 ===
Election	1st Member	1st Party	2nd Member	2nd Party
1832	Charles Wentworth-FitzWilliam	Whig	James Brudenell	Tory
1833	William Wentworth-FitzWilliam	Whig	James Brudenell	Tory
1834	William Wentworth-FitzWilliam	Whig	James Brudenell	Conservative
1835	Thomas Philip Maunsell	Conservative	James Brudenell	Conservative
1837	Thomas Philip Maunsell	Conservative	George Finch-Hatton	Conservative
1841	Thomas Philip Maunsell	Conservative	Augustus Stafford	Conservative
Apr. 1857	William Cecil	Conservative	Augustus Stafford	Conservative
Dec. 1857	William Cecil	Conservative	George Ward Hunt	Conservative
1867	Sackville Stopford-Sackville	Conservative	George Ward Hunt	Conservative
1877	Sackville Stopford-Sackville	Conservative	Brownlow Cecil	Conservative
1880	Hon. Charles Spencer	Liberal	Brownlow Cecil	Conservative

=== 1885 - 1918 ===
Election	Member	Party
1885	Lord Burghley	Conservative
1895	Edward Monckton	Conservative
1900	Sackville Stopford-Sackville	Conservative
1906	George Nicholls	Liberal
1910	Henry Brassey	Conservative
1918	constituency abolished	

== Election results ==
=== Elections in the 1830s ===
General election 1832: North Northamptonshire (2 seats)
Party	Candidate	Votes	%
Whig	Charles Wentworth-Fitzwilliam	1,562	26.8
Tory	James Brudenell	1,541	26.4
Whig	William Hanbury	1,455	25.0
Tory	Thomas Tryon	1,269	21.8
Turnout		3,063	91.1
Registered electors		3,363	
Majority		21	0.4
Whig win (new seat)			
Majority		86	1.4
Tory win (new seat)			

Wentworth-Fitzwilliam succeeded to the peerage, becoming 5th Earl Fitzwilliam and causing a by-election.

By-election, 9 March 1833: North Northamptonshire
Party	Candidate	Votes	%
Whig	William Charles Wentworth-Fitzwilliam, Viscount Milton	Unopposed	
Whig hold			

General election 1835: North Northamptonshire (2 seats)
Party	Candidate	Votes	%
Whig	William Charles Wentworth-Fitzwilliam, Viscount Milton	Unopposed	
Conservative	James Brudenell	Unopposed	
Registered electors		3,552	
Whig hold			
Conservative hold			

Wentworth-Fitzwilliam's death caused a by-election.

By-election, 21 December 1835: North Northamptonshire
Party	Candidate	Votes	%
Conservative	Thomas Philip Maunsell	1,841	59.6
Whig	William Hanbury	1,247	40.4
Majority		594	19.2
Turnout		3,088	85.1
Registered electors		3,627	
Conservative gain from Whig			

General election 1837: North Northamptonshire (2 seats)
Party	Candidate	Votes	%
Conservative	Thomas Philip Maunsell	1,842	36.5
Conservative	George Finch-Hatton	1,801	35.7
Whig	William Wentworth-Fitzwilliam	1,404	27.8
Majority		397	7.9
Turnout		3,164	84.2
Registered electors		3,757	
Conservative hold			
Conservative gain from Whig			

=== Elections in the 1840s ===
General election 1841: North Northamptonshire (2 seats)
Party	Candidate	Votes	%	±%
Conservative	Augustus O'Brien	Unopposed		
Conservative	Thomas Philip Maunsell	Unopposed		
Registered electors		4,166		
Conservative hold				
Conservative hold				

General election 1847: North Northamptonshire (2 seats)
Party	Candidate	Votes	%	±%
Conservative	Augustus Stafford	Unopposed		
Conservative	Thomas Philip Maunsell	Unopposed		
Registered electors		4,065		
Conservative hold				
Conservative hold				

=== Elections in the 1850s ===
General election 1852: North Northamptonshire (2 seats)
Party	Candidate	Votes	%	±%
Conservative	Augustus Stafford	562	48.6	N/A
Conservative	Thomas Philip Maunsell	560	48.4	N/A
Whig	George Wentworth-FitzWilliam	34	2.9	New
Majority		526	45.5	N/A
Turnout		595 (est)	15.3 (est)	N/A
Registered electors		3,900		
Conservative hold				
Conservative hold				

General election 1857: North Northamptonshire (2 seats)
Party	Candidate	Votes	%	±%
Conservative	Augustus Stafford	Unopposed		
Conservative	William Cecil	Unopposed		
Registered electors		3,800		
Conservative hold				
Conservative hold				

Stafford's death caused a by-election.

By-election, 16 December 1857: North Northamptonshire
Party	Candidate	Votes	%	±%
Conservative	George Ward Hunt	1,461	56.6	N/A
Whig	Fitzpatrick Vernon	1,119	43.4	New
Majority		342	13.2	N/A
Turnout		2,580	67.9	N/A
Registered electors		3,800		
Conservative hold				

General election 1859: North Northamptonshire (2 seats)
Party	Candidate	Votes	%	±%
Conservative	William Cecil	1,849	36.8	N/A
Conservative	George Ward Hunt	1,831	36.4	N/A
Liberal	Fitzpatrick Vernon	1,344	26.8	N/A
Majority		487	9.6	N/A
Turnout		3,184 (est)	84.3 (est)	N/A
Registered electors		3,777		
Conservative hold				
Conservative hold				

=== Elections in the 1860s ===
General election 1865: North Northamptonshire (2 seats)
Party	Candidate	Votes	%	±%
Conservative	George Ward Hunt	Unopposed		
Conservative	William Cecil	Unopposed		
Registered electors		4,016		
Conservative hold				
Conservative hold				

Cecil was appointed Treasurer of the Household, requiring a by-election.

1866 North Northamptonshire by-election (1 seat)
Party	Candidate	Votes	%	±%
Conservative	William Cecil	Unopposed		
Conservative hold				

Cecil succeeded to the peerage, becoming 3rd Marquess of Exeter, causing a by-election.

1867 North Northamptonshire by-election
Party	Candidate	Votes	%	±%
Conservative	Sackville Stopford	Unopposed		
Conservative hold				

Hunt was appointed Chancellor of the Exchequer, requiring a by-election.

1868 North Northamptonshire by-election
Party	Candidate	Votes	%	±%
Conservative	George Ward Hunt	Unopposed		
Conservative hold				

General election 1868: North Northamptonshire (2 seats)
Party	Candidate	Votes	%	±%
Conservative	George Ward Hunt	Unopposed		
Conservative	Sackville Stopford	Unopposed		
Registered electors		5,310		
Conservative hold				
Conservative hold				

=== Elections in the 1870s ===
General election 1874: North Northamptonshire (2 seats)
Party	Candidate	Votes	%	±%
Conservative	George Ward Hunt	Unopposed		
Conservative	Sackville Stopford-Sackville	Unopposed		
Registered electors		5,215		
Conservative hold				
Conservative hold				

Hunt was appointed First Lord of the Admiralty, causing a by-election.

1874 North Northamptonshire by-election (1 seat)
Party	Candidate	Votes	%	±%
Conservative	George Ward Hunt	Unopposed		
Conservative hold				

Hunt's death caused a by-election.

1877 North Northamptonshire by-election (1 seat)
Party	Candidate	Votes	%	±%
Conservative	Brownlow Cecil	2,261	60.5	N/A
Liberal	Edmund Wyatt-Edgell	1,475	39.5	New
Majority		786	21.0	N/A
Turnout		3,736	74.2	N/A
Registered electors		5,033		
Conservative hold				

=== Elections in the 1880s ===
General election 1880: North Northamptonshire (2 seats)
Party	Candidate	Votes	%	±%
Liberal	Charles Spencer	2,425	33.9	N/A
Conservative	Brownlow Cecil	2,405	33.7	N/A
Conservative	Sackville Stopford-Sackville	2,316	32.4	N/A
Majority		109	1.5	N/A
Turnout		4,830 (est)	82.8 (est)	N/A
Registered electors		5,833		
Liberal gain from Conservative		Swing	N/A	
Conservative hold		Swing	N/A	

General election 1885: North Northamptonshire
Party	Candidate	Votes	%	±%
Conservative	Brownlow Cecil	4,467	51.0	−15.1
Liberal	James Carmichael	4,296	49.0	+15.1
Majority		171	2.0	N/A
Turnout		8,763	90.0	+7.2 (est)
Registered electors		9,741		
Conservative hold		Swing	−15.1	

1886 general election: North Northamptonshire
Party	Candidate	Votes	%	±%
Conservative	Brownlow Cecil	Unopposed		
Conservative hold				

Cecil was appointed Groom in Waiting, requiring a by-election.

1886 North Northamptonshire by-election
Party	Candidate	Votes	%	±%
Conservative	Brownlow Cecil	Unopposed		
Conservative hold				

=== Elections in the 1890s ===
General election 1892: North Northamptonshire
Party	Candidate	Votes	%	±%
Conservative	Brownlow Cecil	4,505	54.0	N/A
Liberal	John Turner Stockburn	3,836	46.0	New
Majority		669	8.0	N/A
Turnout		8,341	83.4	N/A
Registered electors		9,999		
Conservative hold		Swing	N/A	

General election 1895: North Northamptonshire
Party	Candidate	Votes	%	±%
Conservative	Edward Philip Monckton	Unopposed		
Conservative hold				

=== Elections in the 1900s ===
General election 1900: North Northamptonshire
Party	Candidate	Votes	%	±%
Conservative	Sackville Stopford-Sackville	4,559	58.0	N/A
Liberal	Frederick Barlow	3,303	42.0	New
Majority		1,256	16.0	N/A
Turnout		7,862	77.0	N/A
Registered electors		10,209		
Conservative hold		Swing	N/A	

Nicholls

General election 1906: North Northamptonshire
Party	Candidate	Votes	%	±%
Lib-Lab	George Nicholls	4,880	53.8	+11.8
Conservative	Sackville Stopford-Sackville	4,195	46.2	−11.8
Majority		685	7.6	N/A
Turnout		9,075	84.9	+7.9
Registered electors		10,688		
Lib-Lab gain from Conservative		Swing	+11.8	

=== Elections in the 1910s ===
General election January 1910: North Northamptonshire
Party	Candidate	Votes	%	±%
Conservative	Henry Brassey	5,520	55.5	+9.3
Lib-Lab	George Nicholls	4,429	44.5	−9.3
Majority		1,091	11.0	N/A
Turnout		9,949	92.4	+7.5
Conservative gain from Lib-Lab		Swing	+9.3	

Wilkinson

General election December 1910: North Northamptonshire
Party	Candidate	Votes	%	±%
Conservative	Henry Brassey	5,272	55.5	0.0
Liberal	James Rennie Wilkinson	4,221	44.5	0.0
Majority		1,051	11.0	0.0
Turnout		9,493	88.2	−4.2
Conservative hold		Swing	0.0	

General Election 1914–15:

Another General Election was required to take place before the end of 1915. The political parties had been making preparations for an election to take place and by July 1914, the following candidates had been selected;

- Unionist: Henry Brassey
- Liberal:

== See also ==
- Peterborough (UK Parliament constituency)

== Sources ==
- Leigh Rayment's Historical List of MPs – Constituencies beginning with "N" (part 3)
