= Harry Manfield =

Harry Manfield

Harry Manfield (1 February 1855 – 9 February 1925) was a British Liberal Party politician. He was the Member of Parliament (MP) for Mid Northamptonshire from 1906 to 1918. He was also a prominent Freemason.

Parliament of the United Kingdom
Preceded by Charles Robert Spencer	Member of Parliament for Mid Northamptonshire; 1906–1918	Constituency abolished
