= Edward Monckton (North Northamptonshire MP) =

British barrister and politician

Edward Philip Monckton (18 July 1840 – 17 April 1916) was a British barrister and politician.

He was the eldest son of Edward Henry Cradock Monckton of Fineshade Abbey, Northamptonshire, but was born at Bareilly in India, while his father was serving in the East India Company. Monckton grew up at Fineshade Abbey. He was educated privately, before studying at Trinity College, Cambridge. In 1868, he became a barrister at Inner Temple. He settled near Oundle, and was elected to Northamptonshire County Council for the King's Cliffe division. He also served from 1883 to 1884 as High Sheriff of Rutland. He was editor of Baylis' Law of Domestic Servants.

Monckton was elected for the Conservative Party in North Northamptonshire at the 1895 UK general election, retiring in 1900. He then served as Recorder of Northampton until his death, in 1916.

He married in 1866, Christabel, daughter of Rev. Christopher Dunkin Francis, vicar of Tysoe, Warwickshire.

Parliament of the United Kingdom
Preceded by Brownlow Cecil	Member of Parliament for Northamptonshire North; 1895–1900	Succeeded by Sackville Stopford-Sackville
Civic offices
Preceded by John Davenport-Handley	High Sheriff of Rutland; 1883–1884	Succeeded by William Gore Marshall
