= Mid Northamptonshire =

Parliamentary constituency in the United Kingdom, 1885–1918

- Former county constituency for the House of Commons

1885–1918
- Seats: one
- Created from: South Northamptonshire, North Northamptonshire
- Replaced by: Northampton, Daventry, Kettering and Wellingborough

Mid Northamptonshire was a county constituency in Northamptonshire, which returned one Member of Parliament (MP) to the House of Commons of the Parliament of the United Kingdom, elected by the first past the post system.

== Boundaries ==
1885–1918: The Municipal Borough of Northampton, the Sessional Divisions of Little Bowden and Northampton, and parts of the Sessional Divisions of Daventry (the parishes of Ashby St. Ledgers, Barby, Claycoton Crick, Elkington, Kilsby, Lilboume, Long Buckley, Stanford, Watford, West Haddon, Winwick, and Yelvertoft) and Kettering (the parishes of Draughton, Faxton, Glendon, Harrington, Loddington, Mawsley, Orton, Rothwell, and Thorpe Malsor).

== History ==
The constituency was created by the Redistribution of Seats Act 1885 for the 1885 general election, and abolished for the 1918 general election.

== Members of Parliament ==
Election	Member	Party
1885	Charles Spencer	Liberal
1895	Sir James Pender	Conservative
1900	Charles Spencer	Liberal
1906	Harry Manfield	Liberal
1918	constituency abolished	

== Election results ==
Decades:	1880s; 1890s; 1900s; 1910s

=== Elections in the 1880s ===
General election 1885: Mid Northamptonshire
Party	Candidate	Votes	%	±%
Liberal	Charles Spencer	5,446	55.6	
Conservative	Pickering Phipps	4,347	44.4	
Majority		1,099	11.2	
Turnout		9,793	86.6	
Registered electors		11,306		
Liberal win (new seat)				

Spencer was appointed Groom in Waiting, requiring a by-election.

By-election, 12 Feb 1886: Mid Northamptonshire
Party	Candidate	Votes	%	±%
Liberal	Charles Spencer'	Unopposed		
Liberal hold				

General election 1886: Mid Northamptonshire
Party	Candidate	Votes	%	±%
Liberal	Charles Spencer	4,887	55.4	−0.2
Liberal Unionist	William Cornwallis Cartwright	3,931	44.6	+0.2
Majority		956	10.8	−0.4
Turnout		8,818	78.0	−8.6
Registered electors		11,306		
Liberal hold		Swing	−0.2	

=== Elections in the 1890s ===
General election 1892: Mid Northamptonshire
Party	Candidate	Votes	%	±%
Liberal	Charles Spencer	4,731	52.4	−3.0
Conservative	James Pender	4,300	47.6	+3.0
Majority		431	4.8	−6.0
Turnout		9,031	83.6	+5.6
Registered electors		10,808		
Liberal hold		Swing	−3.0	

Spencer is appointed Vice-Chamberlain of the Household, requiring a by-election.

1892 Mid Northamptonshire by-election
Party	Candidate	Votes	%	±%
Liberal	Charles Spencer	Unopposed		
Liberal hold				

Pender

General election 1895: Mid Northamptonshire
Party	Candidate	Votes	%	±%
Conservative	James Pender	5,084	51.4	+3.8
Liberal	Charles Spencer	4,802	48.6	−3.8
Majority		282	2.8	N/A
Turnout		9,886	84.4	+0.8
Registered electors		11,714		
Conservative gain from Liberal		Swing	+3.8	

=== Elections in the 1900s ===
Spencer

General election 1900: Mid Northamptonshire
Party	Candidate	Votes	%	±%
Liberal	Charles Spencer	5,399	54.0	+5.4
Conservative	James Pender	4,605	46.0	−5.4
Majority		794	8.0	N/A
Turnout		10,004	82.2	−2.2
Registered electors		12,175		
Liberal gain from Conservative		Swing	+5.4	

Peel

General election 1906: Mid Northamptonshire
Party	Candidate	Votes	%	±%
Liberal	Harry Manfield	6,307	55.5	+1.5
Conservative	Robert Francis Peel	5,067	44.5	−1.5
Majority		1,240	11.0	+3.0
Turnout		11,374	84.6	+2.4
Registered electors		13,450		
Liberal hold		Swing	+1.5	

=== Elections in the 1910s ===
Manfield

General election January 1910: Mid Northamptonshire
Party	Candidate	Votes	%	±%
Liberal	Harry Manfield	6,559	52.2	−3.3
Conservative	Guy Paget	6,003	47.8	+3.3
Majority		556	4.4	−6.6
Turnout		12,562	88.5	+3.9
Liberal hold		Swing	−3.3	

General election December 1910: Mid Northamptonshire
Party	Candidate	Votes	%	±%
Liberal	Harry Manfield	6,281	51.0	−1.2
Conservative	Guy Paget	6,031	49.0	+1.2
Majority		250	2.0	−2.4
Turnout		12,312	85.8	−1.7
Liberal hold		Swing	−1.2	

General Election 1914–15:

Another General Election was required to take place before the end of 1915. The political parties had been making preparations for an election to take place and by July 1914, the following candidates had been selected;

- Liberal: Harry Manfield
- Unionist: Guy Paget
