= Thomas Hargreaves =

English miniature-painter

Thomas Hargreaves or Hargraves, RBA (1774 – 1847) was an English miniature-painter.

== Life ==
Born at Liverpool on 16 Mar. 1774, he was son of Henry Hargreaves, a woollen-draper and Elizabeth Rigby. He began painting miniatures at an early age, and on the advice of Sir Thomas Lawrence, who had seen some of his work, he came to London in 1793. Hargreaves bound himself by indenture to serve as apprentice to Lawrence at a salary of fifty guineas per annum for two years from March 1793, and remained with him some time longer. Ill-health compelled his return to Liverpool, where he devoted himself entirely to miniature-painting. In 1798 he sent to the Royal Academy a portrait of Richard Suett, the comedian, and two miniatures. He exhibited there again in 1808 and 1809. In 1811 he became a member of the Liverpool Academy, and was a frequent contributor to its exhibitions. On the foundation of the Society of British Artists in Suffolk Street in 1824, Hargreaves became an original member, and contributed to its exhibitions. He died at Liverpool on 5 January 1847, and was buried at Liverpool 9 January 1847. Among those whose portraits he painted in miniature were Mrs. Gladstone, the Right Hon. W. E. Gladstone and his sister together as children, Sir Thomas Lawrence, Lord Edward Fitzgerald, James Bartleman, the musician (afterwards in the South Kensington Museum), and others. Some of his miniatures have been engraved.

== Family ==
Hargreaves left three sons, all miniature-painters. One of them, George Thomas Hargreaves, born in 1797, was also a member of the Society of British Artists, and died on 18 December 1869.
