= Thomas Henry Baylis =

English barrister, judge, and legal author

Thomas Henry Baylis (1817–1908) was an English barrister, judge, and legal author.

== Life ==
Born in London on 22 June 1817, he was second son of Edward Baylis of Middlesex. Sent to Harrow School, near which his father was then living, in 1825, at the early age of seven, he spent nine years there, leaving as a monitor in 1834. In 1835 he matriculated as a scholar at Brasenose College, Oxford, graduating B.A. in 1838 and proceeding M.A. in 1841.

In 1834 Baylis had already entered as a student of the Inner Temple; but he practised for some time as a special pleader before being called to the bar in 1856, when he joined the northern circuit. He took silk in 1875, and two years later became a bencher of his inn.

From 1876 to 1903 Baylis was judge of the Liverpool Court of Passage. He was an active volunteer, retiring in 1882 as lieutenant-colonel of the 18th Middlesex Volunteer Rifle Corps. He was one of the founders of the Egypt Exploration Fund, drafting the original articles of association, and a vice-president of the Royal United Service Institution.

In good health almost to the last, Baylis died at Bournemouth on 4 October 1908, and was buried in the cemetery there.

== Works ==
As a lawyer, Baylis was best known for a treatise on domestic servants, The Rights, Duties, and Relations of Domestic Servants and their Masters and Mistresses (1857; 6th edit. 1906). Other works were:

- Fire Hints (1884);
- The Temple Church and Chapel of St. Anne (1893), a historical record and guide, third edition in 1900;
- Introductory Address on the Office of Reader or Lector and Lecture on Treasure Trove, delivered in the Inner Temple Hall, Michaelmas 1898 (1901);
- Workmen's Compensation Act (1902; 7th edit. 1907); and
- The True Account of Nelson's Famous Signal (1905), pamphlet on "England expects" and other Nelson matters.

== Family ==
Baylis married on 14 August 1841 Louisa Lord, youngest daughter of John Ingle of Devon. Their third son, Thomas Erskine Baylis, was called to the bar in 1874.

== Notes ==
Attribution

This article incorporates text from a publication now in the public domain: Lee, Sidney, ed. (1912). "Baylis, Thomas Henry". Dictionary of National Biography (2nd supplement). Vol. 1. London: Smith, Elder & Co.
