= Brownlow Cecil, 4th Marquess of Exeter =

British peer and Conservative politician

The Most Honourable The Marquess of Exeter PC DL
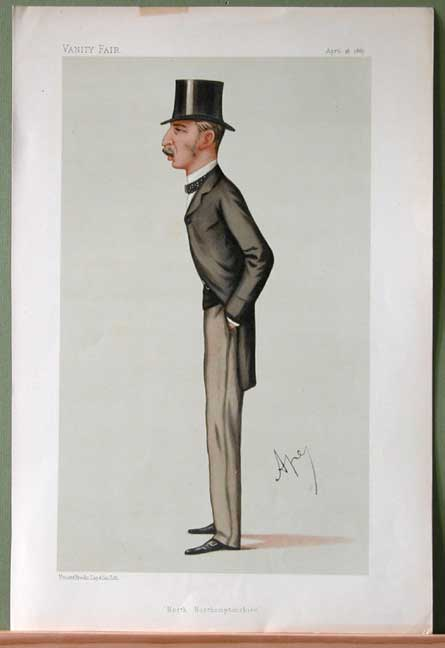
- "North Northamptonshire". Caricature by Ape published in Vanity Fair in 1887.

Vice-Chamberlain of the Household
- In office 24 November 1891 – 11 August 1892
- Monarch: Queen Victoria
- Prime Minister: The Marquess of Salisbury
- Preceded by: Viscount Lewisham
- Succeeded by: Hon Charles Spencer

Personal details
- Born: 20 December 1849
- Died: 9 April 1898 (aged 48)
- Party: Conservative
- Spouse: Isabella Whichcote (m. 1875)
- Children: William Cecil, 5th Marquess of Exeter

Brownlow Henry George Cecil, 4th Marquess of Exeter PC DL (20 December 1849 – 9 April 1898), styled Lord Burghley between 1867 and 1895, was a British peer and Conservative politician. He served as Vice-Chamberlain of the Household between 1891 and 1892.

== Background ==
Exeter was the eldest son of William Cecil, 3rd Marquess of Exeter, and Lady Georgiana Sophia, daughter of Thomas Pakenham, 2nd Earl of Longford. Lord William Cecil and Lord John Joicey-Cecil were his younger brothers.

== Political career ==
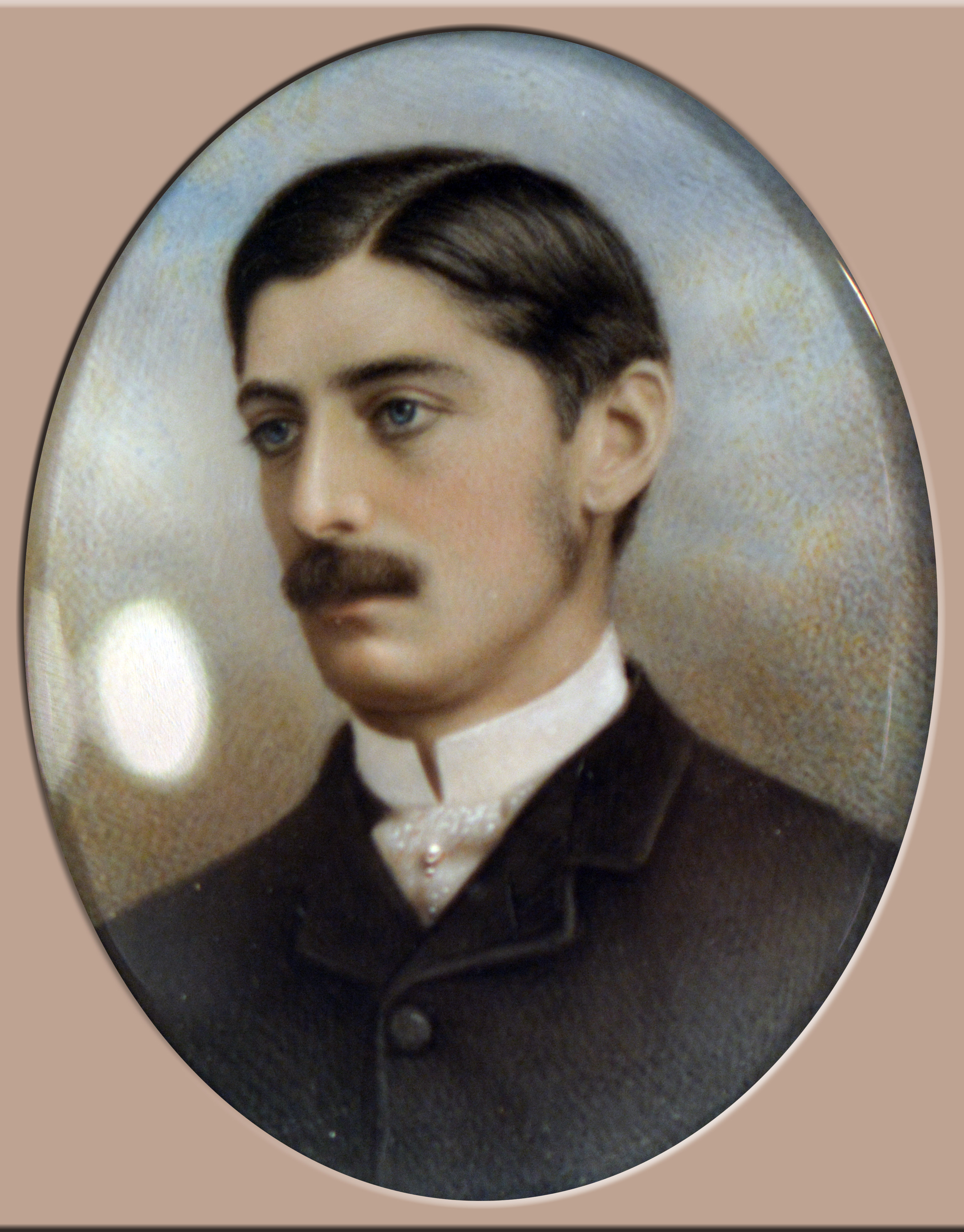
Portrait miniature by T. Hargreaves

Exeter was elected to the House of Commons for Northamptonshire North in 1877, a seat he held until 1895, and served under his kinsman Lord Salisbury as Vice-Chamberlain of the Household from 1891 to 1892. In 1891 he was admitted to the Privy Council. He succeeded his father in the marquessate in 1895 and took his seat in the House of Lords.

Apart from his political career Lord Exeter served as a Captain in the Grenadier Guards and later, on 15 August 1877, was appointed a Major in the Northampton and Rutland Militia commanded by his father. The regiment became the 3rd and 4th Battalions, Northamptonshire Regiment, in 1881 and he succeeded his father and uncle as Lieutenant-Colonel Commmandant in 1889. He retained the command until his death. He also served as a Deputy Lieutenant of Lincolnshire.

== Family ==
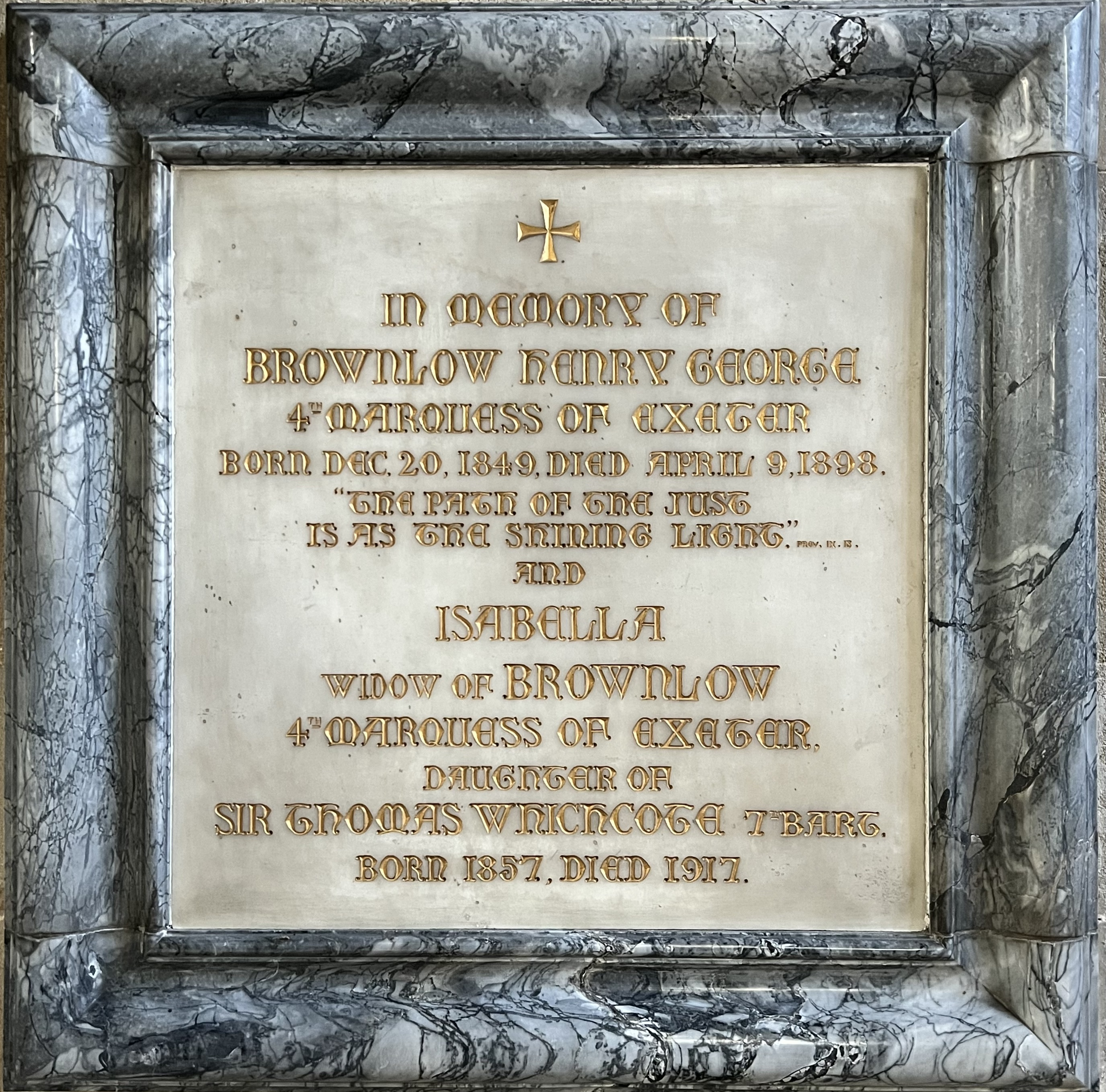
Memorial in St Martin's Church, Stamford

Lord Exeter married Isabella, daughter of Sir Thomas Whichcote, 7th Baronet, in 1875. He died in April 1898, aged only 48, and was succeeded in his titles by his son and only child, William. The Marchioness of Exeter died in July 1917.

== Arms ==
Coat of arms of Brownlow Cecil, 4th Marquess of Exeter
Crest On a chapeau gules, turned up ermine, a garb or, supported by two Lions, the dexter argent, and the sinister azure. Escutcheon Barry of ten argent and azure over all six escutcheons sable, three, two, and one, each charged with a lion rampant of the first. Supporters On either side a lion ermine. Motto Cor unum via una (One heart, one way).

Parliament of the United Kingdom
Preceded by George Ward Hunt; Sackville Stopford-Sackville	Member of Parliament for Northamptonshire North; 1877–1895; With: Sackville Stopford-Sackville 1877–1880; Hon. Charles Spencer 1880–1885 (Representation reduced to one member 1885)	Succeeded by Edward Philip Monckton
Political offices
Preceded by Viscount Lewisham	Vice-Chamberlain of the Household; 1891–1892	Succeeded by Hon. Charles Spencer
Peerage of the United Kingdom
Preceded by William Alleyne Cecil	Marquess of Exeter; 1895–1898	Succeeded by William Thomas Brownlow Cecil
