= Sidney Peel =

British army officer

Colonel Sir Sidney Cornwallis Peel, 1st Baronet, CB, DSO, TD (1870–1938), was a British Army officer, barrister and financier. He was also for the coalition government term 1918–1922, a Conservative Member of Parliament (MP). For the 19 years until death he was a celebrated chairman of the Export Credits Guarantee Department Advisory Committee.

== Background and marriage ==
Peel was born on 3 June 1870, the third son of Arthur Peel, 1st Viscount Peel, Speaker of the House of Commons, the youngest son of Prime Minister Sir Robert Peel. His mother was Adelaide, daughter of William Stratford Dugdale. Schooled at Eton College he was there a King's Scholar and Newcastle Scholar in 1889, winning a scholarship at New College, Oxford, where he won first-class honours in Greats and was elected a Fellow of Trinity in 1893. Shortly after he became Secretary to the Licensing Committee (chaired by his father).

Peel married Lady Adelaide Margaret Delia, daughter of Charles Spencer, 6th Earl Spencer, in 1914.

== Career ==
In 1898 he was called to the bar. In 1900, he served in the Boer War as a trooper in the 40th (Oxfordshire) Company, 10th battalion, Imperial Yeomanry, for which bestowed the Queen's South Africa Medal with three clasps. In February 1902 he was commissioned into the Bedfordshire Yeomanry as a Captain.

He reported on Egypt for a newspaper and befriended Ernest Cassel. This led to chairmanship of the London Committee of the National Bank of Egypt and vice-presidency of the Morocco State Bank. In 1901, he was an official in the National Discount Company, then director in 1911 and chairman in 1922. In 1911 he was appointed to Oxford Chest by Lord Curzon, and in 1922 became Deputy Steward of the University.

At outbreak of World War I, he was Major commanding B Squadron of Bedfordshire Yeomanry, then subsequently promoted Lieutenant Colonel and commanding officer in May 1915. He took Bedfordshire Yeomanry to France that June as part of the 1st Cavalry Division. He was mentioned in dispatches and appointed to the DSO. He would later be promoted Colonel.

The Foreign Officer took him away from active service to be among its financial crisis advisors in November 1917, as such in 1919 he attended the Peace Conference, scrutinising the Bulgarian settlement. From 1919 until death he was chairman of the Export Credits Guarantee Department Advisory Committee and much praised. He was appointed to the inaugurate Oxford University Statutory Commission, resigning from that the next year to be British Plenipotentiary to the Tariff Conference in China 1925–1926. In 1927 he went to India on the Committee of Inquiry on Indian States-British relations. He was appointed to the Municipal Banks Committee and given other government work; he was some time honorary treasurer of the National Trust.

For the above in 1929 he was made C.B., and in 1936 made a baronet. His brother George attributed his "services were in constant request, and as constantly given, for matters of the highest importance" due to his ability to "master any subject with accuracy...and...width".

== Political term of office ==
He was a Colonel in the British Army, still in the official Parliamentary report (Hansard) in 1920 holding command of the Bedfordshire Yeomanry.

He was selected as the Conservative, winning, candidate for Uxbridge in 1918 for which he served one term, to 1922 as MP. In 1936, he was created a Baronet, of Eyeworth in the County of Bedford.

His contributions to national-level politics were: a written question in 1919, as to whether a cash-on-delivery system of household goods would be permitted in law, to which the reply was no; and two speeches, in April 1920, a mention of a clause in the German Empire constitution which would allow Austrians to sit in the Reichstag; and in February the long opening address (after the King's Speech) in his uniform with one ten-word-interruption (counted thus by Hansard as two speeches).

== Personal legacy ==
He died at 26 Hill Street, Mayfair, London, on 19 December 1938, aged 68, with the baronetcy becoming extinct. Lady Peel, who was 19 years younger than her husband, died in January 1981, latterly of Barton Hall, Barton Turf, aged 91. His probate was resworn in 1939, at £92,586 (equivalent to about £5,200,000 in 2025).; his widow's was sworn in 1981, at £41,897 (equivalent to about £160,000 in 2025).

== Works ==
- Trooper 8008 - embodies his experiences in the Boer War.
- The Binding of the Nile and the New Sudan. Gutenberg
- O.C. Beds Yeomanry - World War I memoir, 1935
- "British Rule in the Sudan" . The Empire and the century. London: John Murray. 1905. pp. 800–08.

Parliament of the United Kingdom
Preceded by Hon. Arthur Mills	Member of Parliament for Uxbridge; 1918–1922	Succeeded by Dennistoun Burney
Baronetage of the United Kingdom
New creation	Baronet of Eyeworth; 1936–1938	Extinct
