= Thomas Philip Maunsell =

British politician

Member of Parliament for North Northamptonshire
- In office 21 December 1835 – 30 March 1857 Serving with Augustus Stafford (1841–1857); George Finch-Hatton (1837–1841); James Brudenell (1835–1837)
- Preceded by: William Wentworth-FitzWilliam; James Brudenell
- Succeeded by: William Cecil; Augustus Stafford

Personal details
- Born: 16 October 1781 Thorpe Malsor, Northamptonshire, England
- Died: 4 March 1866 (aged 84)
- Party: Conservative
- Spouse: Caroline Elizabeth Cokayne (m. 1811; died 1860)
- Children: Nine
- Parent(s): William Maunsell; Lucy Oliver

Thomas Philip Maunsell (16 October 1781 – 4 March 1866) was a British Conservative politician.

Born at Thorpe Malsor, Northamptonshire, Maunsell was the son of William Maunsell, Archdeacon of Kildare, and his wife Lucy, daughter of Philip Oliver. He married Caroline Elizabeth Cokayne, daughter of William Cokayne and Barbara née Hill in 1811 in London, and they had at least nine children: John Borlase; William Thomas (1812–1862); Lucy Diana (1814–1892); George Edmond (1816–1875); Thomas Cokayne (1818–1887); John Borlase (1820–1902); Sophia Caroline (1822–1889); Barbara Anna (1825–1842); and Charles Cullen (1827–1891).

Maunsell was first elected Conservative MP for North Northamptonshire at a by-election in 1835—caused by the death of William Wentworth-FitzWilliam—and held the seat until 1857 when he did not stand for re-election.

Outside of politics, Maunsell was High Sheriff of Northamptonshire in 1821, also a Justice of the Peace and Deputy Lieutenant for the same county. He was appointed Colonel of the disembodied Northamptonshire Militia on 2 April 1845. When the regiment was revived in 1854 he became its first Honorary Colonel.

Parliament of the United Kingdom
Preceded by William Wentworth-FitzWilliam; James Brudenell	Member of Parliament for North Northamptonshire; 1835–1857; With: Augustus Stafford (1841–1857); George Finch-Hatton (1837–1841); James Brudenell (1835–1837)	Succeeded by William Cecil; Augustus Stafford
