= George Ward Hunt =

British Conservative politician (1825–1877)

The Right Honourable George Ward Hunt
- Hunt in 1873

Chancellor of the Exchequer
- In office 29 February 1868 – 1 December 1868
- Monarch: Victoria
- Prime Minister: Benjamin Disraeli
- Preceded by: Benjamin Disraeli
- Succeeded by: Robert Lowe

Personal details
- Born: 30 July 1825 Winkfield, Berkshire
- Died: 29 July 1877 (aged 51) Bad Homburg, Germany
- Party: Conservative
- Spouse: Alice Eden (d. 1894)
- Education: Christ Church, Oxford

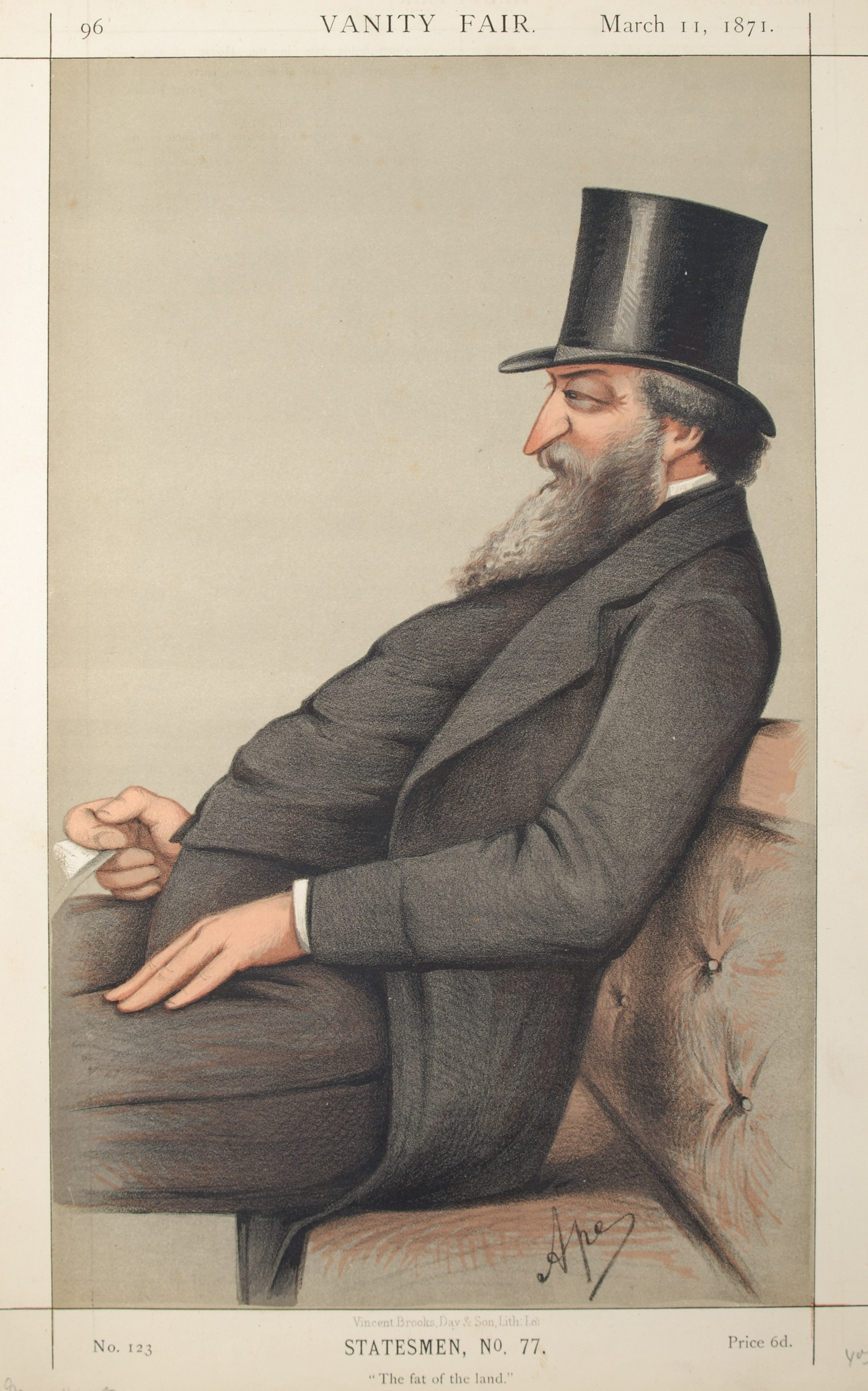
Hunt as caricatured by Carlo Pellegrini in Vanity Fair, March 1871

George Ward Hunt (30 July 1825 – 29 July 1877) was a British statesman of the Conservative Party who was Chancellor of the Exchequer and First Lord of the Admiralty in the first and second ministries of Benjamin Disraeli.

== Early life ==
Hunt was born at Buckhurst Park at Winkfield in Berkshire, the eldest son of the Rev. George Hunt of Winkfield, and his wife Emma Gardiner, daughter of Samuel Gardiner of Coombe Lodge, Oxfordshire. His father was rector of Barningham and then Boughton. He was educated at Eton College. He matriculated at Christ Church, Oxford in 1844. As an undergraduate, he went on vacation reading parties with Arthur Hugh Clough: in 1845 at Grasmere, in 1846 at Castleton of Braemar and in 1847 at Drumnadrochit on Loch Ness. In Clough's poem The Bothie of Toper-na-fuosich, he is identified with the outsize character Hobbes. Hobbes dances in a kilt, and Hunt painted a self-portrait of himself wearing one.

Hunt graduated B.A. in 1848, and M.A. in 1851; on 21 November of that year he was called to the bar at the Inner Temple.

== Political career ==
Hunt entered the House of Commons in 1857 as Member of Parliament for Northamptonshire North, at the end of the year, having made several unsuccessful attempts previously. He was a Secretary to the Treasury from 1866 to 1868, in the ministry of the 14th Earl of Derby. Regarded as "sensible but dull", according to Derby's biographer Hawkins, he was then appointed to the Exchequer when Disraeli took office.

When Hunt presented his one and only Budget speech, he kept the House of Commons waiting, and it is supposed that he had left the speech behind. When he spoke, the Budget presentation was the shortest recorded.

Hunt was appointed to the Admiralty for Disraeli's second ministry, serving from 1874 until his death from gout in 1877. Although he was considered competent at finance, his turn at the Admiralty was, for a long time, not much admired. That attitude has, however, been revised. Canada's Ward Hunt Island was named for him. It is off Ellesmere Island, and of interest for the Ward Hunt Ice Shelf observed in 1876 by Pelham Aldrich.

Hunt died at Bad Homburg, Germany, in July 1877, on the eve of his 52nd birthday. His wife died in 1894.

== Family ==
Hunt married Alice, daughter of the Right Reverend Robert Eden, Bishop of Moray, Ross and Caithness, in 1857. They had five sons and five daughters, including Sir Allen Thomas Hunt, an admiral in the Royal Navy.

Hunt's residence was Wadenhoe House in Northamptonshire.

== Notes ==
Parliament of the United Kingdom
Preceded by Augustus Stafford; Lord Burghley	Member of Parliament for Northamptonshire North; 1857–1877; With: Lord Burghley 1857–1867; Sackville Stopford-Sackville 1867–1877	Succeeded by Sackville Stopford-Sackville; Lord Burghley
Political offices
Preceded by Hugh Childers	Financial Secretary to the Treasury; 1866–1868	Succeeded by George Sclater-Booth
Preceded by Benjamin Disraeli	Chancellor of the Exchequer; 1868	Succeeded by Robert Lowe
Preceded by George Goschen	First Lord of the Admiralty; 1874–1877	Succeeded by W. H. Smith
