= Peel baronets =

Set index for Peel baronets

There have been three baronetcies created for persons with the surname Peel, one in the Baronetage of Great Britain and two in the Baronetage of the United Kingdom. One of the titles is extant.

- Peel baronets of Drayton Manor and Bury (1800): see Earl Peel
- Peel baronets of Tyersall Hall (1897): see Sir Theophilus Peel, 1st Baronet (1837–1911)
- Peel baronets of Eyeworth (1936): see Sir Sidney Cornwallis Peel, 1st Baronet (1870–1938)
