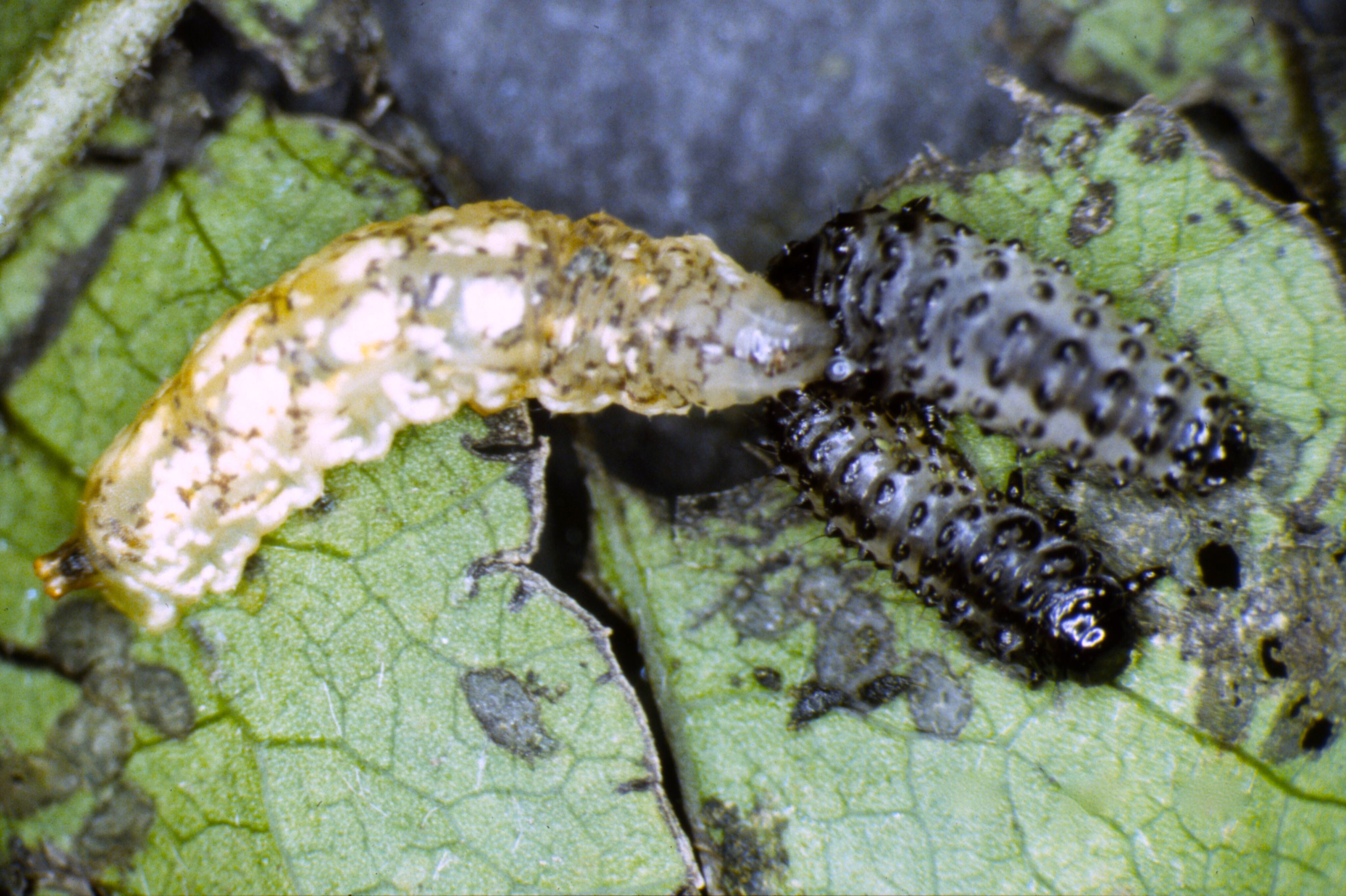
- Larva of Parasyrphus nigritarsus (l.) eating Phratora vitellinae larva (r.)

Scientific classification
- Kingdom: Animalia
- Phylum: Arthropoda
- Clade: Pancrustacea
- Class: Insecta
- Order: Diptera
- Family: Syrphidae
- Genus: Parasyrphus
- Species: P. nigritarsis

Binomial name
- Parasyrphus nigritarsis (Zetterstedt, 1843)

Synonyms
- Scaeva nigritarsis Zetterstedt, 1843

= Parasyrphus nigritarsis =

Species of fly

Parasyrphus nigritarsis is a species of hoverfly, from the family Syrphidae, in the order Diptera. It is known from northern Europe and North America, and has been considered to be a rare species in parts of its range. Adults visit flowers as a source of nutrition, and females lay their eggs on clutches of eggs of leaf beetles (family Chrysomelidae). When the Parasyrphus larvae hatch, they first consume leaf beetle eggs and then consume immature beetles until they reach the pupal stage. This species is related to hoverflies that prey on aphids as larvae, and has been investigated in studies of chemical ecology and food web ecology.

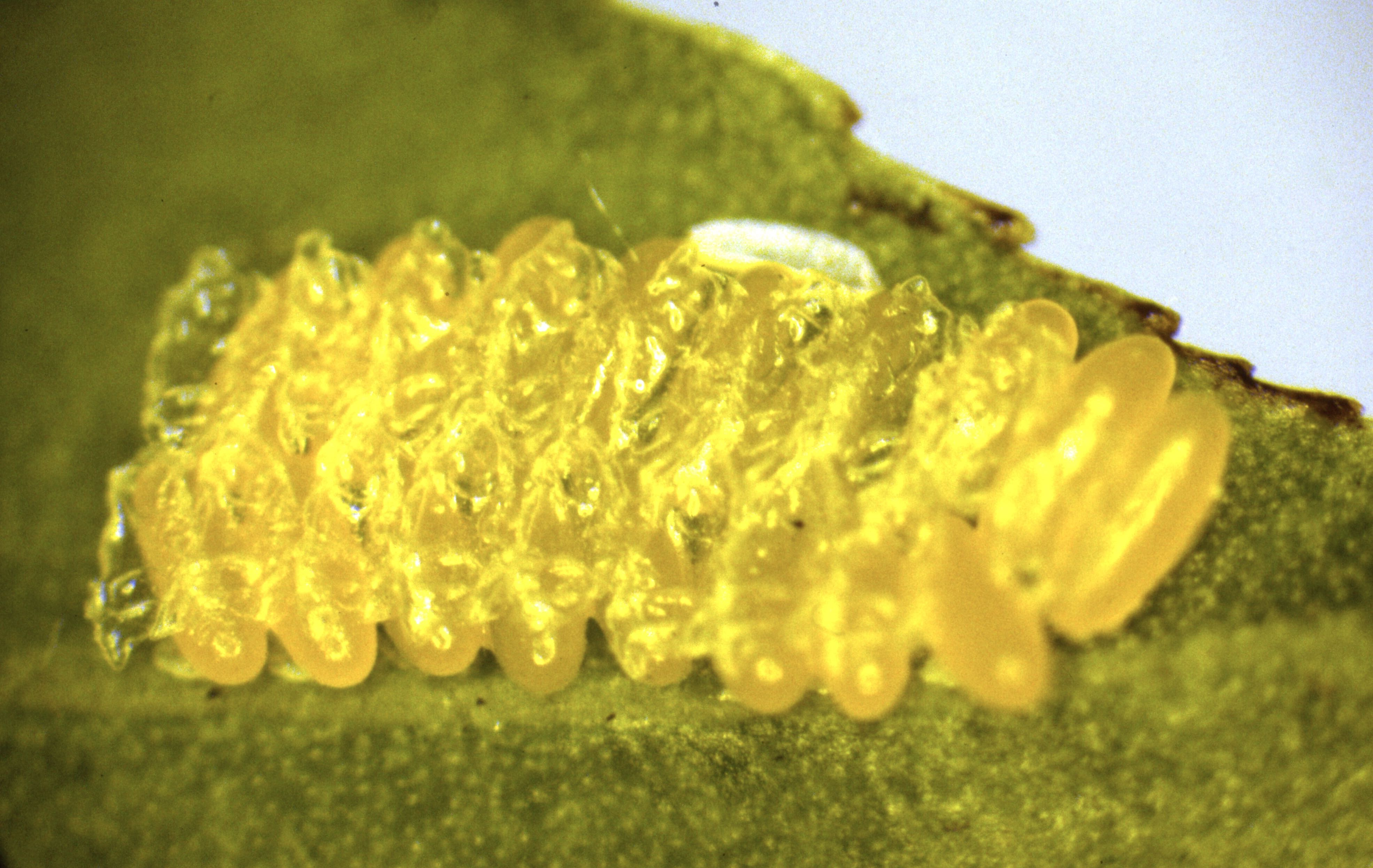
Egg of P. nigritarsus (top, pale) on egg clutch of P. vitellinae (yellow)

== Distribution and habitat ==
In Eurasia, P. nigritarsus occurs in the Nordic countries, south to Belgium, Germany, Switzerland and northern Spain, Ireland east through Central Europe into Russia and on to the Russian Far East and Japan. In North America, it occurs from Alaska to Quebec and south to Washington and Idaho. Thus, P. nigritarsus is considered to be present throughout the Northern Hemisphere and it is one of several syrphid species included in the 'Barcode of Life Data System, a project focusing on species occurring in Canada that includes taxonomic information, metadata, and DNA sequences for several individuals at the mitochondrial cytochrome oxidase gene. The flies tend to live in woodland and wetland populated by Alnus, Salix, Populus tremula and Alnus alnobetula scrub up to 2,000 metres (6,600 ft) in the Alps. Flowers visited by adults include Anemonoides nemorosa, Potentilla erecta, Prunus cerasus, Prunus spinosa, Ranunculus, Rhododendron aureum, Rubus idaeus, and Salix.

== Description ==
Eggs of P. nigritarsus are white and are smaller than the eggs of their leaf beetle prey (see photo). In the larval stage, mature P. nigritarsus individuals (third instar) are 14–16 mm long and approximately 3 mm in diameter. Larvae have two pairs of lobes at the anal segment and a complex colour pattern with triangular yellow markings on abdominal segments and thin dark brown stripes anterior to them. Adults are medium-sized flies whose legs have pale intermediate segments (femur, tibia) and dark terminal segments (tarsi). They are somewhat unusual among Parasyrphus species in appearance and behaviour. Adult wing length ranges from 9-11.5 mm. The abdomen is striped and the fly superficially resembles a bee. Abdominal tergites 3 and 4 have a marginal sulcus. The face lacks a black stripe, but has a black edge to the mouth. The frons in females has large dust patches. Biological keys to identify adults and larvae are available. (Note: See the Morphology of Diptera page for definitions of specialized terms describing adult fly morphology.)

== Biology and prey use ==
Parasyrphus nigritarsus has been implicated as a major natural enemy of leaf beetles in the subfamily Chrysomelinae within the Chrysomelidae. These leaf beetles lay multiple clutches of 10-30 eggs on host plants in early summer. All beetle species that have been documented as prey to P. nigritarsus or its North American relative Parasyrphus melanderi possess external defensive secretion glands as larvae, from which they evert volatile secretions that are presumed to be repellent to potential predators. Yet female P. nigritarsus lay their eggs adjacent to or among the beetle eggs, and the fly larvae hatch before the beetles do, indicating that they are closely adapted to the life cycle of their prey. When beetle population densities are high, fly abundance also increases and this can be measured by counting the number of fly eggs laid on each beetle clutch. Most likely, when predator abundance is relatively high, fly females lay eggs on beetle clutches where a prior fly female had already laid her eggs, as was observed for Parasyrphus melanderi in California.

Once the fly eggs hatch, they first consume beetle eggs, and then consume larvae. The beetle defensive secretion does not repel flies. On the contrary, fly larvae are attracted to the odour of beetle larval defensive secretions, regardless of whether the beetle secretion is primarily derived from the host plant or an autogeneously synthesized secretion. Mature fly larvae grasp the prey larva beneath its head and appear to inject a toxin that immobilizes the prey before sucking out its internal tissues. At the population level, these specialist predators are considered voracious and have significant impacts on beetle mortality. They are known to feed on Chrysomela vigintipunctata, Chrysomela lapponica, Chrysomela populi, Plagiosterna aenea, Phratora vulgatissima, and Phratora vitellinae in Europe and on Chrysomela crotchi in North America. Other investigators of beetle population dynamics have noted the presence of a syrphid with very similar behaviour feeding on dock beetles Gastrophysa viridula in the United Kingdom, and similar behaviour has been observed for Parasyrphus melanderi feeding on Chrysomela aeneicollis in California.
