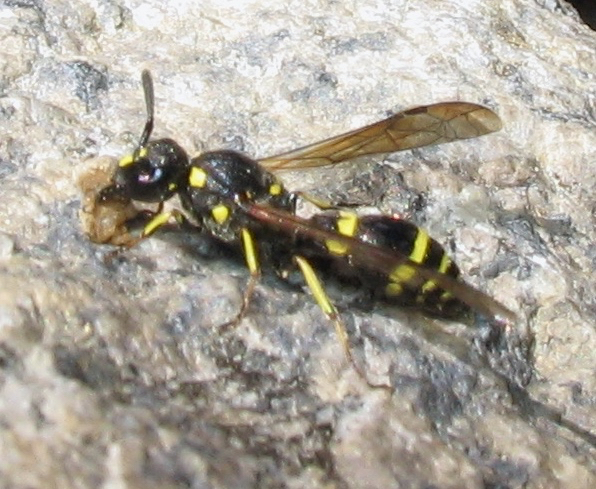
- Symmorphus cristatus female carrying mud to nest

Scientific classification
- Kingdom: Animalia
- Phylum: Arthropoda
- Clade: Pancrustacea
- Class: Insecta
- Order: Hymenoptera
- Infraorder: Aculeata
- Superfamily: Vespoidea
- Family: Vespidae
- Subfamily: Eumeninae
- Genus: Symmorphus
- Species: S. cristatus

Binomial name
- Symmorphus cristatus (Saussure, 1855)

Synonyms
- Odynerus (Protodynerus) cristatus Saussure, 1855; Odynerus (Protodynerus) pumilus Saussure, 1855; Odynerus (Protodynerus) philadelphiae Saussure, 1857; Nortonia nevadaensis Cameron, 1905; Symmorphus cristatus nevadensis (Cameron, 1905); Symmorphus trisulcatus Cameron 1906; Symmorphus hornii Cameron, 1909)

= Symmorphus cristatus =

Species of wasp

Symmorphus cristatus is a species of mason wasp in the subfamily Eumeninae within the family Vespidae. This species is widely distributed in North America, and it preys on the larvae of leaf beetles.

== Description ==
Symmorphus cristatus is one of three Symmorphus species that occur in North America. Viewed from above, the metasomal tergum is narrower than S. albomarginatus or S. canadensis, and it has smaller depressions (cephalic foveae) adjacent to the simple eyes (ocelli) that are spaced closer together than those of S. canadensis. The 'femur' portion of the hind legs has conspicuous hairs, which S. canadensis lacks.

Wing length of S. cristatus ranges from 5.0-9.0mm, and body markings range from pale to yellow. Males are typically about 20% smaller than females, and males typically possess a large pale spot on the ventral part of the face (clypeus) just above the mandibles, whereas in females the spot is small or absent.

== Taxonomy ==
Eumenine wasps differ from other members of the Vespidae by the presence of a single spur on the middle tibia and a cleft in the 'tarsal' claw at the distal end of the legs. They generally possess three submarginal cells on the forewings and are solitary wasps, in contrast to social vespids that build communal nests. Within the Eumeninae, Symmorphus wasps lack a 'petiole' or elongated first abdominal segment, have a furrow on the dorsal side of the anterior abdominal segment (metasomal tergum).

== Distribution ==
Symmorphus cristatus is widely distributed across Canada from the west to the east coast. It is also found in northern regions and mountainous regions in the United States. In California, populations are known in the Sierra Nevada from Inyo to Siskiyou County and in the San Francisco Bay Area.

== Ecology ==
Symmorphus cristatus belongs to a lineage of 'trap-nesting' solitary wasps in which adult females forage for immature insects to provision a nest, usually found in a pre-existing hole in a tree or log. This 'renting' behavior may have evolved from nest-builders or nest-burrowing wasps; most species in the Eumeninae are either renters or builders, and most of these provision their nests with immature Lepidoptera (butterflies or moths) or beetles. Like other Eumeninae, S. cristatus uses mud or clay to construct nests where larvae are provisioned.

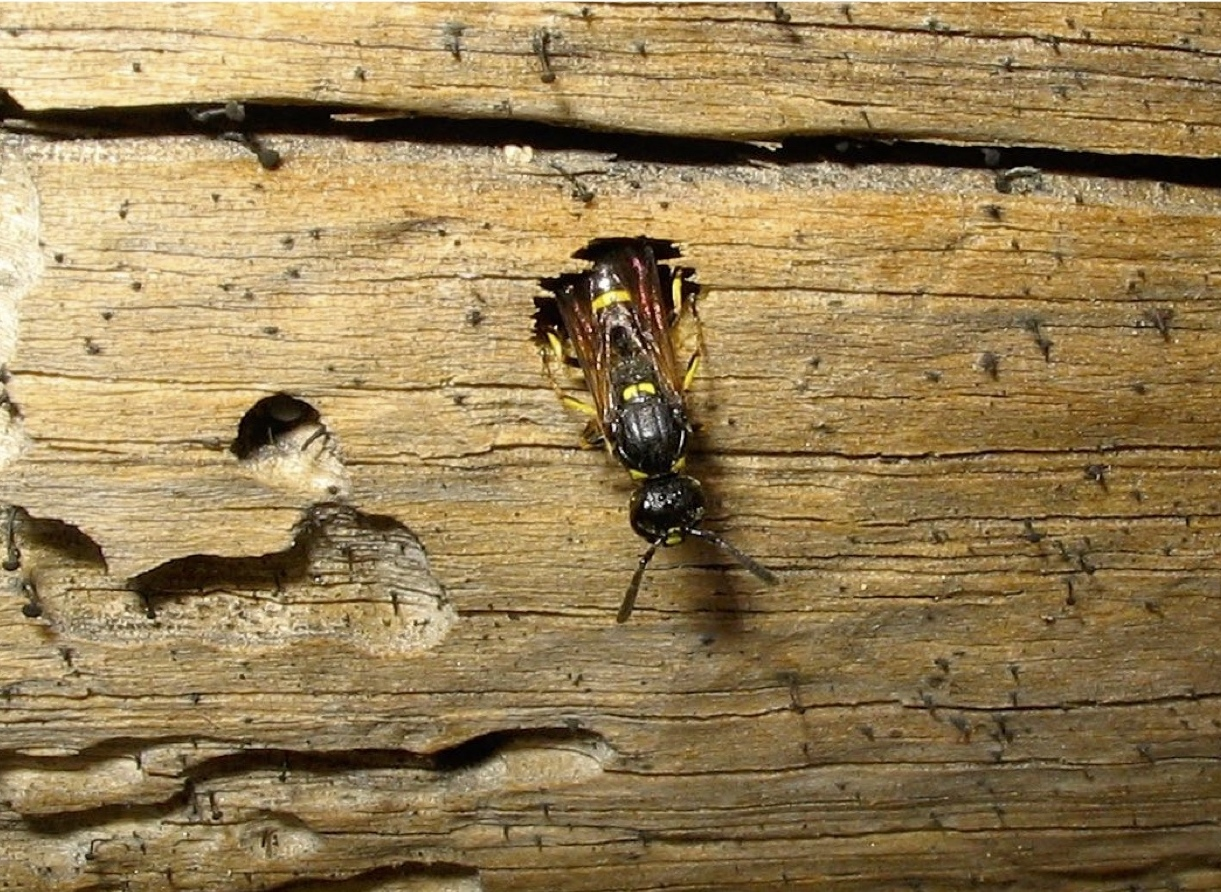
S. cristatus female exiting the nest

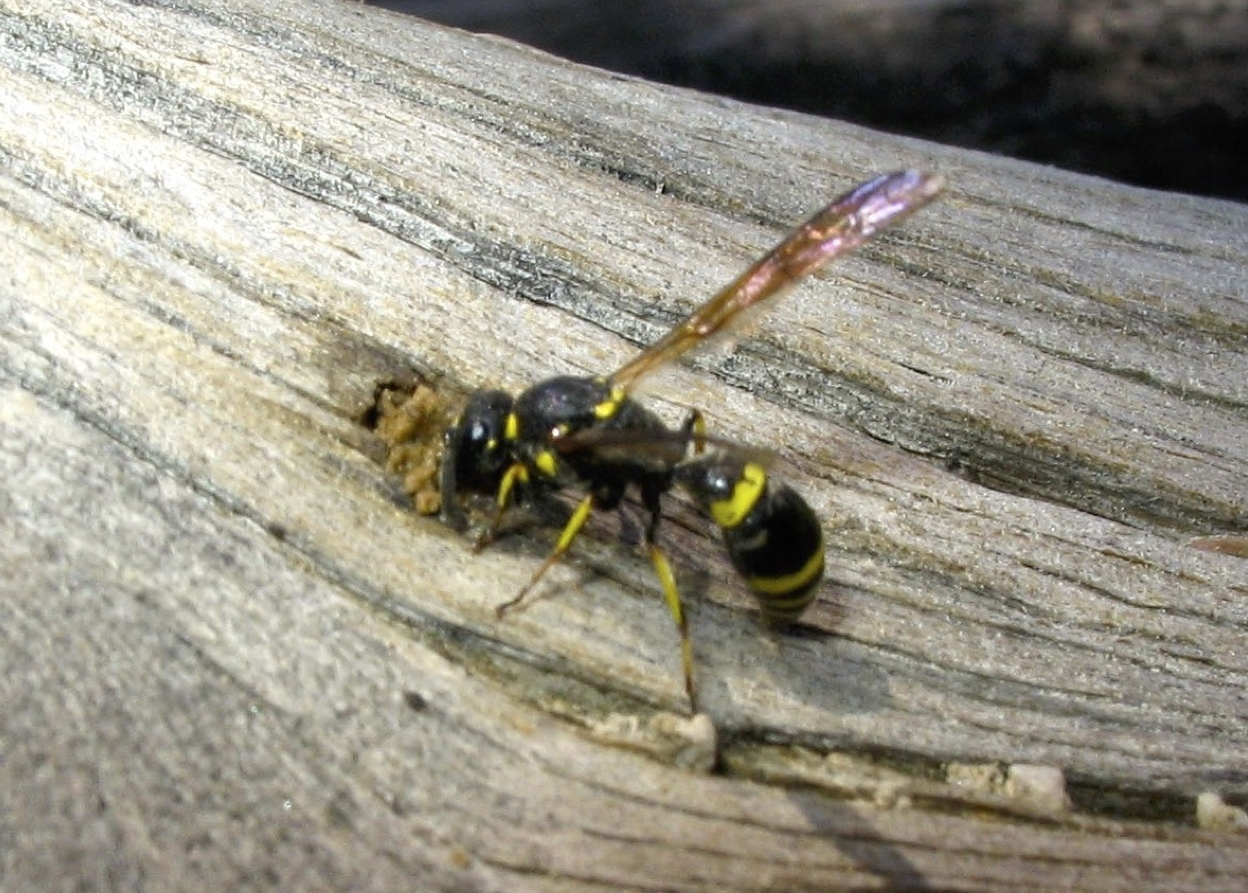
S. cristatus female completing her nest

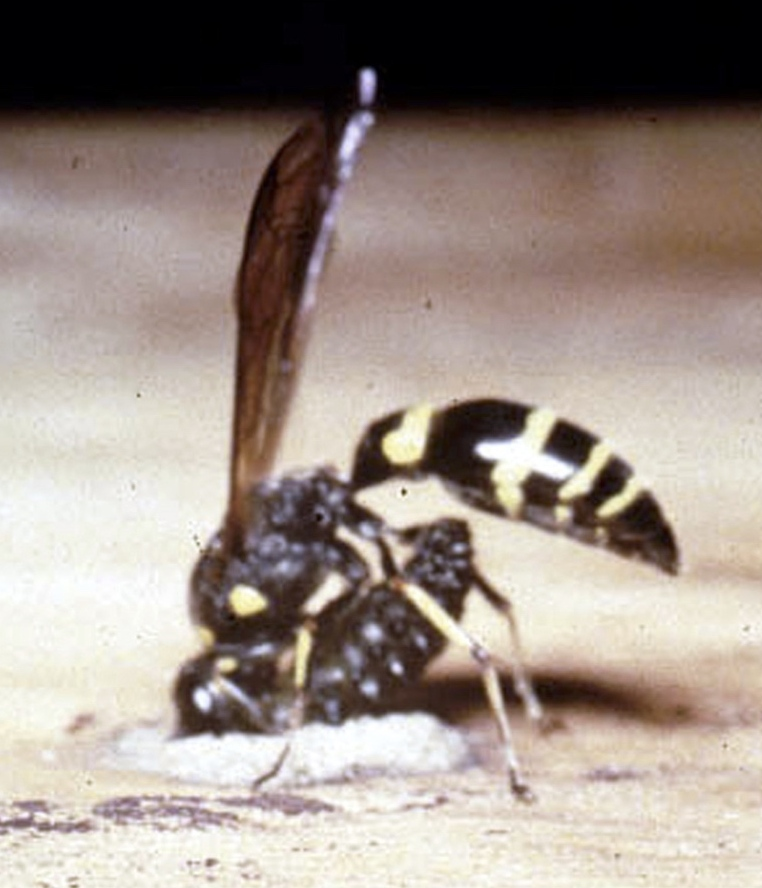
S. cristatus female with a beetle larva

Symmorphus wasps are known to use chrysomeline beetle larvae as prey worldwide. These beetle larvae usually possess external secretion glands from which they evert volatile compounds that are considered anti-predator defenses, but the wasps have little difficulty foraging for them, stinging them to immobilize them, and provisioning each wasp larva with several prey individuals within a cell bounded by a layer of clay or mud. Known prey of S. cristatus include Gonioctena americana, Chrysomela scripta, Chrysomela crotchi, Chrysomela aeneicollis, Chrysomela schaefferi, and Plagiodera californica. The prey use of the wasps indicates that they are not repelled by either the host-plant derived secretions found in Chrysomela larvae or by autogeneously synthesized defensive secretion found in P. californica.

Symmorphus cristatus nests may be subjects of brood parasitism by the cuckoo wasp Chrysis nitidula, as observed by Krombein in eastern North America and observed for populations in the Eastern Sierra Nevada in California.

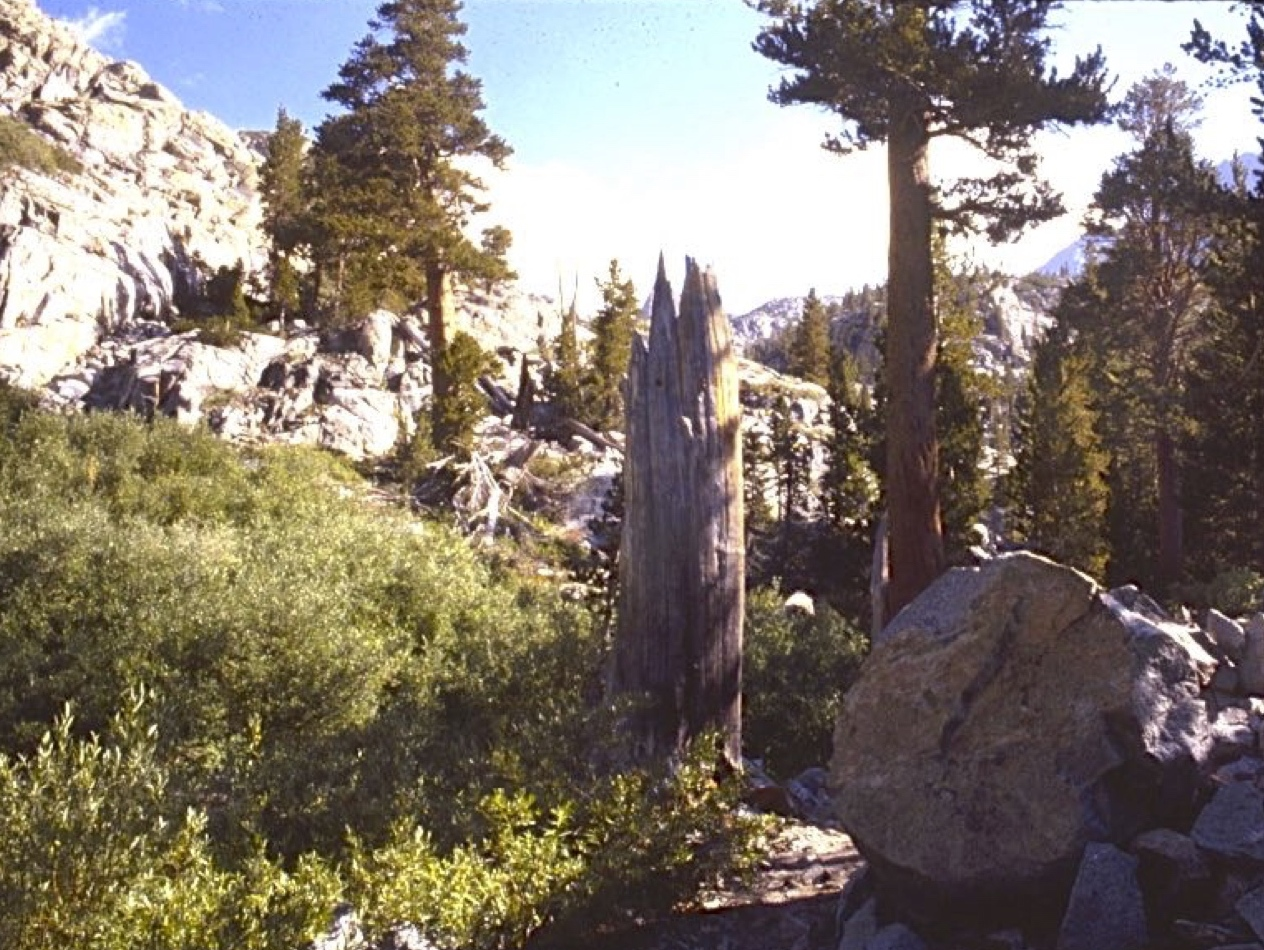
Logepole pine with S. cristatus nests

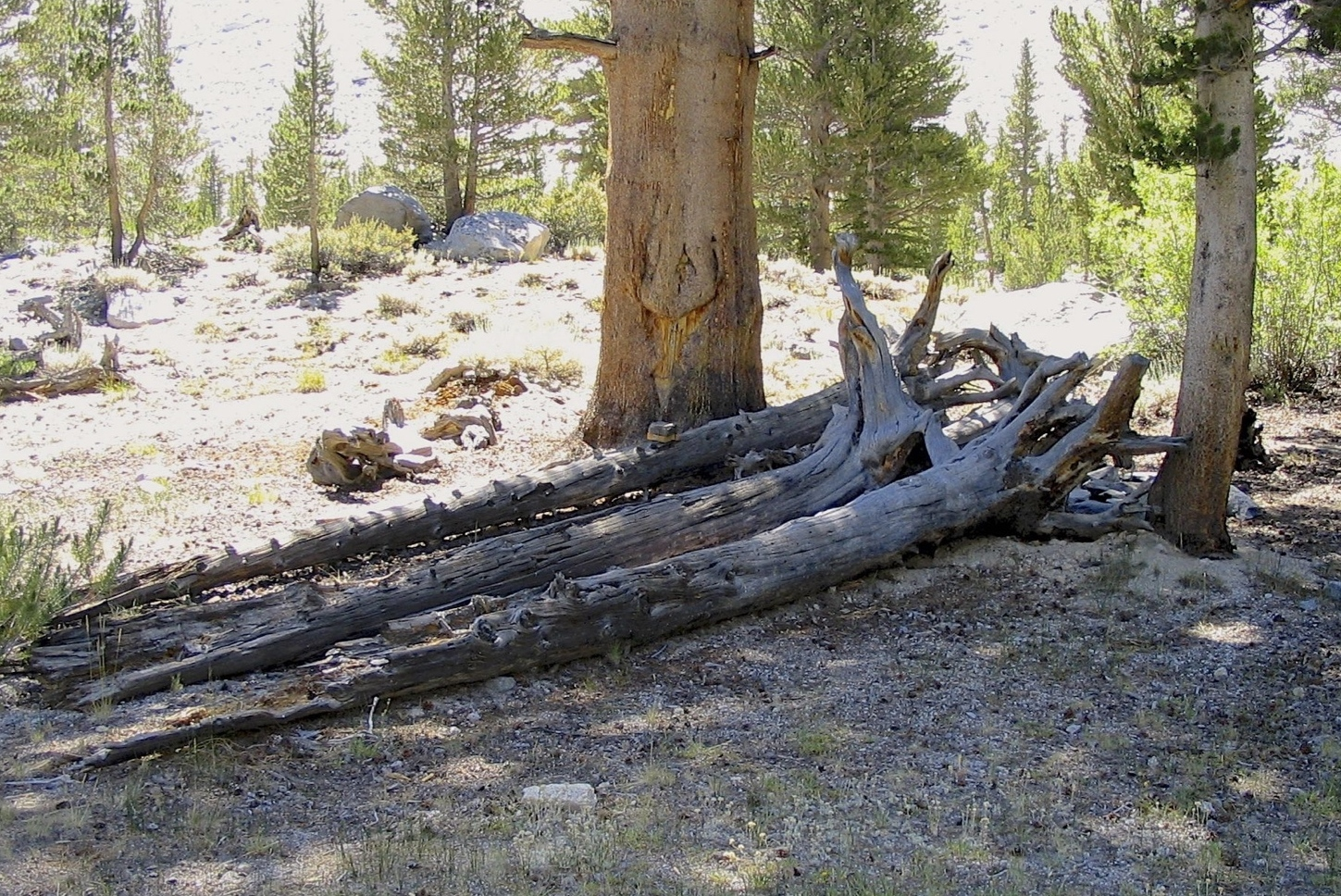
Pine log with S. cristatus nests

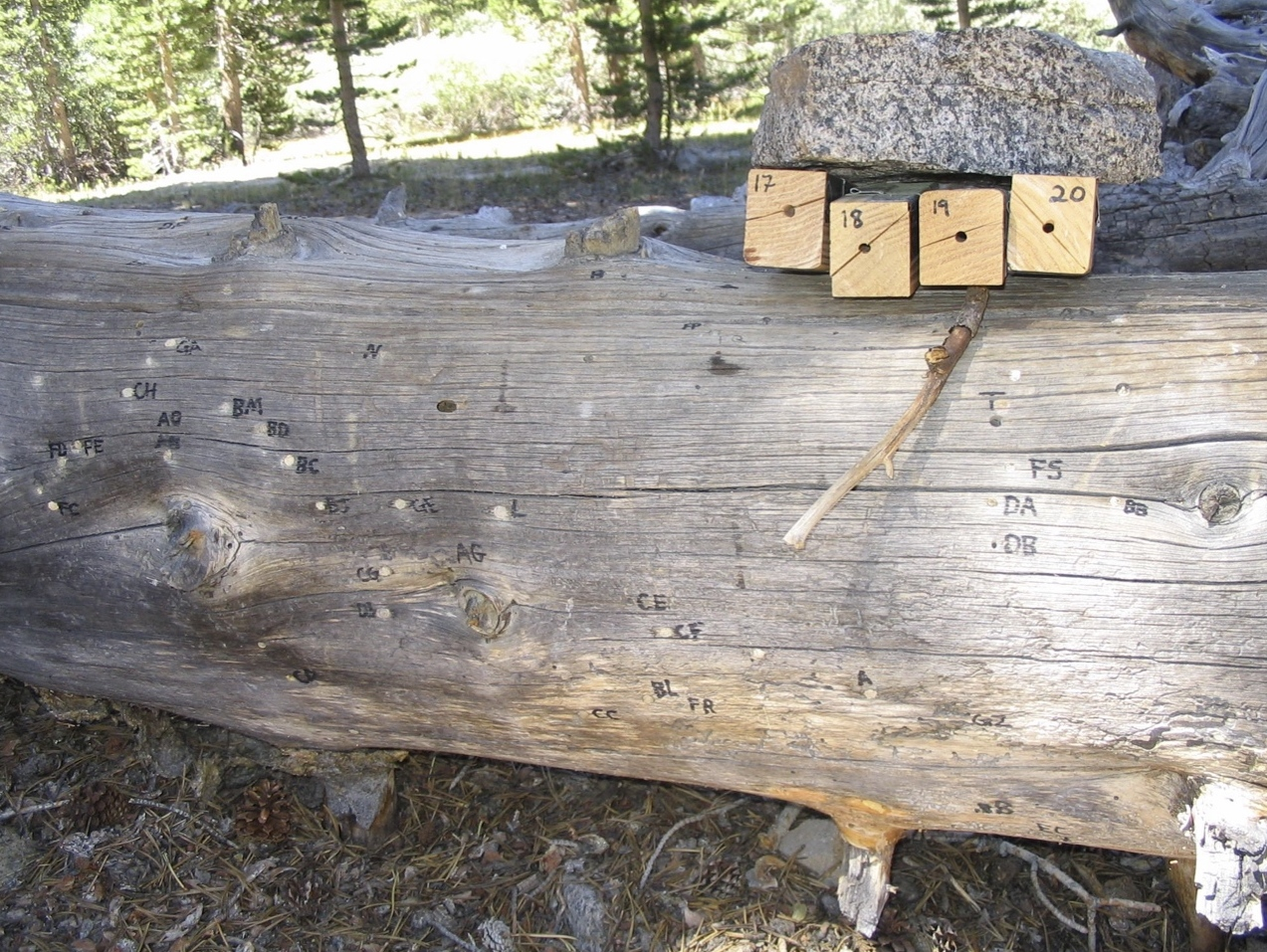
S. cristatus nests and 7 mm wasp traps

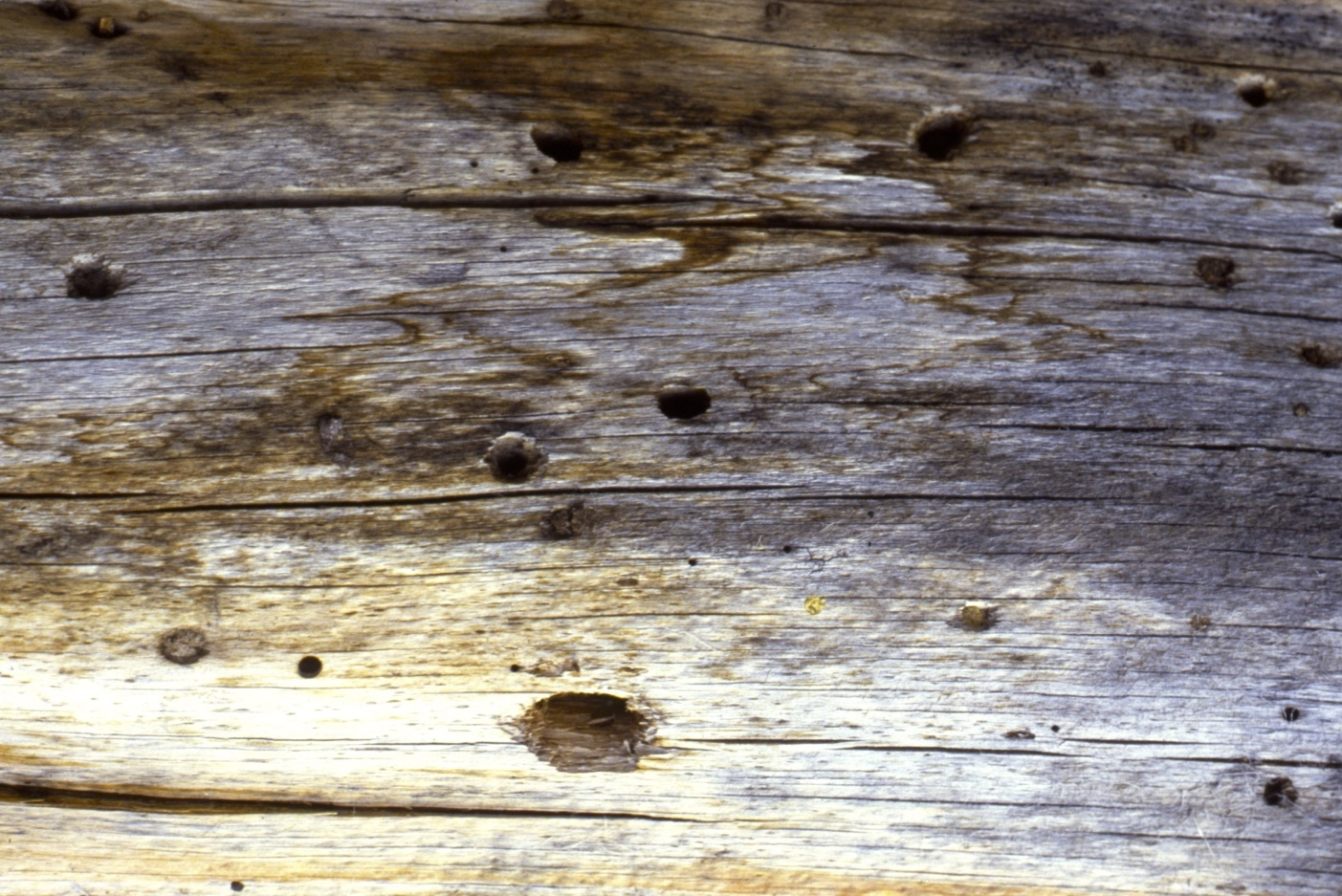
Filled S. cristatus nests in log

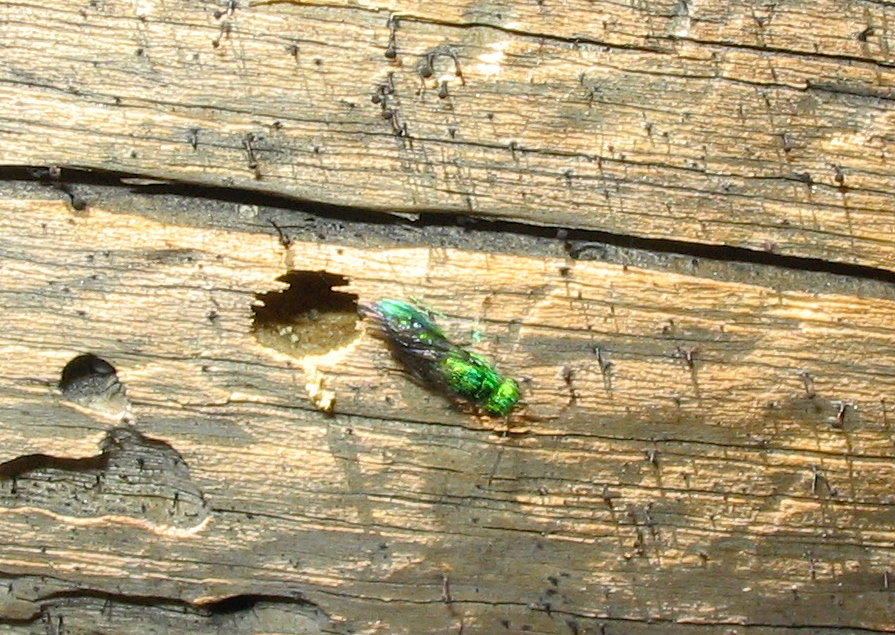
Chrysis nitidula near a S. cristatus nest in Big Pine Creek, CA

Symmorphus wasps are considered major mortality factors influencing populations of several species of leaf beetles. An ecological study on relative importance of different predators on Chrysomela aeneicollis revealed that S. cristatus and the specialist fly predator Parasyrphus melanderi had complementary effects on beetle larval survival, with P. melanderi exerting more predation pressure on eggs and young beetle larvae and S. cristatus exerting a greater effect on mature (third instar) beetle larvae, upon which they specialized.

== Habitat ==
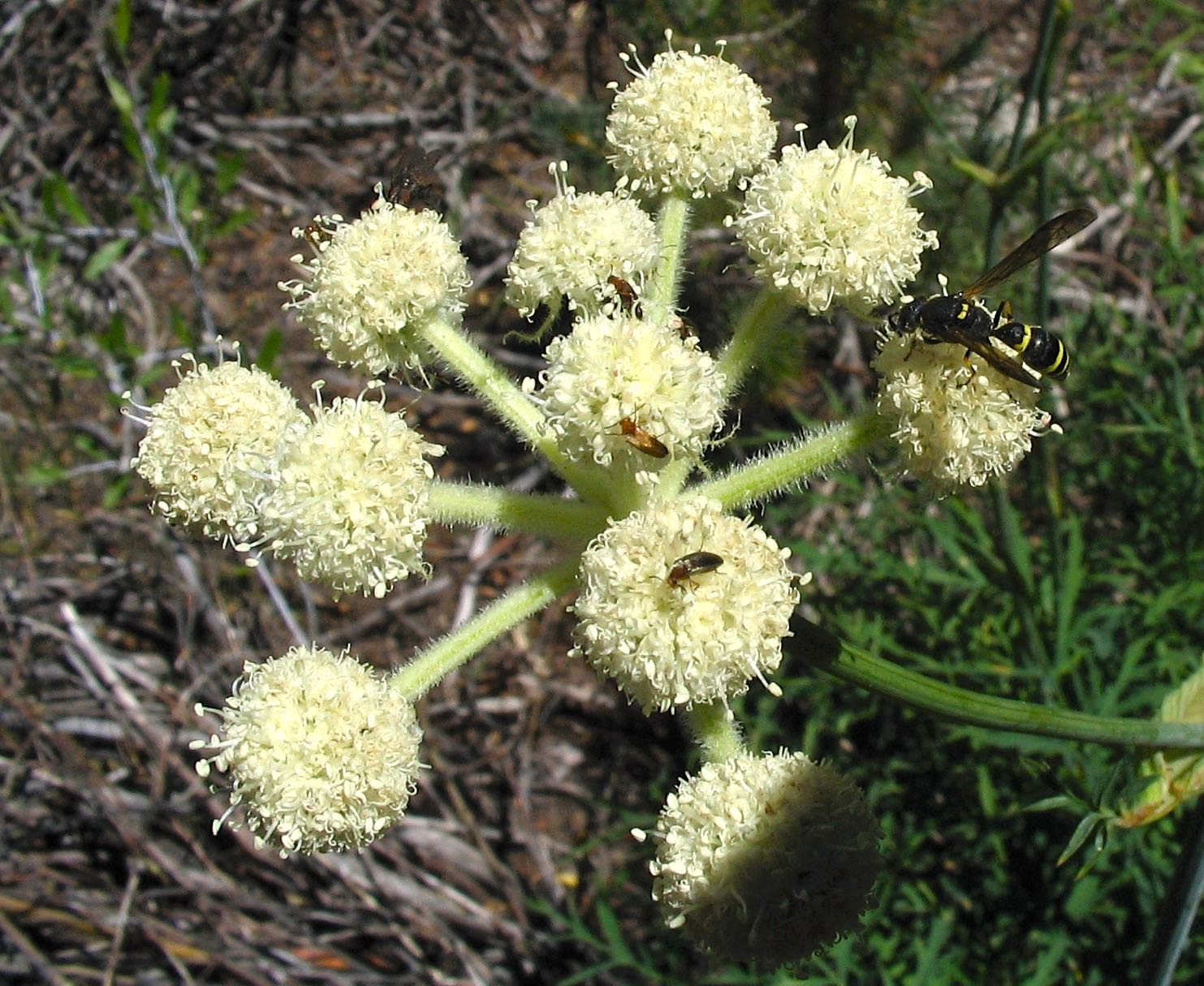
S. cristatus wasp visiting swamp whitehead flower (right)

These wasps are likely to be found where there are adequate floral resources for adults, where adequate dead trees or logs can be found for their nests, and where the chrysomelid beetle larvae used to feed larval wasps can be found. In Illinois, adult S. cristatus wasps were documented on flowers of diverse plants. In the eastern Sierra Nevada mountains, adults can be observed on flowers feeding on nectar of plants in the Apiaceae, such as fennel (Foeniculum vulgare), Queen Anne's lace (Daucus carota), cow parsnip (Heracleum maximum) and swamp whiteheads (Angelica capitellata), also known as ranger's buttons. Females tend to make nests in holes that are approximately 5 mm, and in the eastern Sierra Nevada, they are frequently found in lodgepole pine (Pinus contorta) trees or logs.
