= Alder leaf beetle =

Alder leaf beetle is the common name for two species of leaf beetles that are associated with alders:

- Agelastica alni
- Chrysomela interrupta
