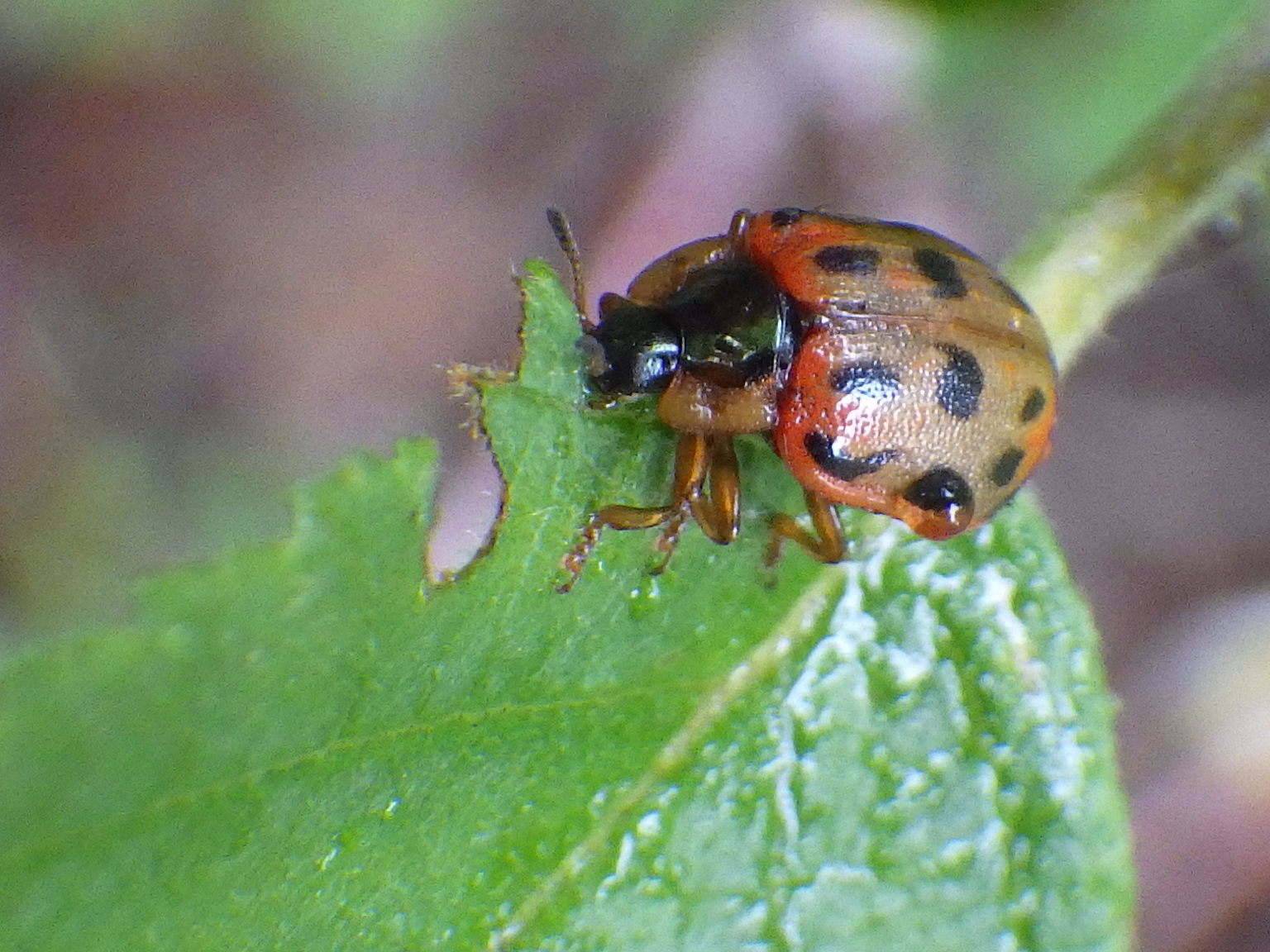

Scientific classification
- Kingdom: Animalia
- Phylum: Arthropoda
- Clade: Pancrustacea
- Class: Insecta
- Order: Coleoptera
- Suborder: Polyphaga
- Infraorder: Cucujiformia
- Family: Chrysomelidae
- Genus: Chrysomela
- Species: C. mainensis

Binomial name
- Chrysomela mainensis J. Bechyné, 1954

Synonyms
- Chrysomela (Macrolina) apaneca Bechyné, 1954

= Chrysomela mainensis =

Species of beetle

Chrysomela mainensis is a species of leaf beetle in the family Chrysomelidae. It is found in North America.

== Subspecies ==
These three subspecies belong to the species Chrysomela mainensis:

- Chrysomela mainensis interna Brown, 1956
- Chrysomela mainensis littorea Brown, 1956
- Chrysomela mainensis mainensis J. Bechyné, 1954
