= Chrysomela falsa =

Scientific classification
- Kingdom: Animalia
- Phylum: Arthropoda
- Clade: Pancrustacea
- Class: Insecta
- Order: Coleoptera
- Suborder: Polyphaga
- Infraorder: Cucujiformia
- Family: Chrysomelidae
- Genus: Chrysomela
- Species: C. falsa

Binomial name
- Chrysomela falsa Brown, 1956

Species of beetle

Chrysomela falsa is a species of leaf beetle in the family Chrysomelidae. It is found in North America.
