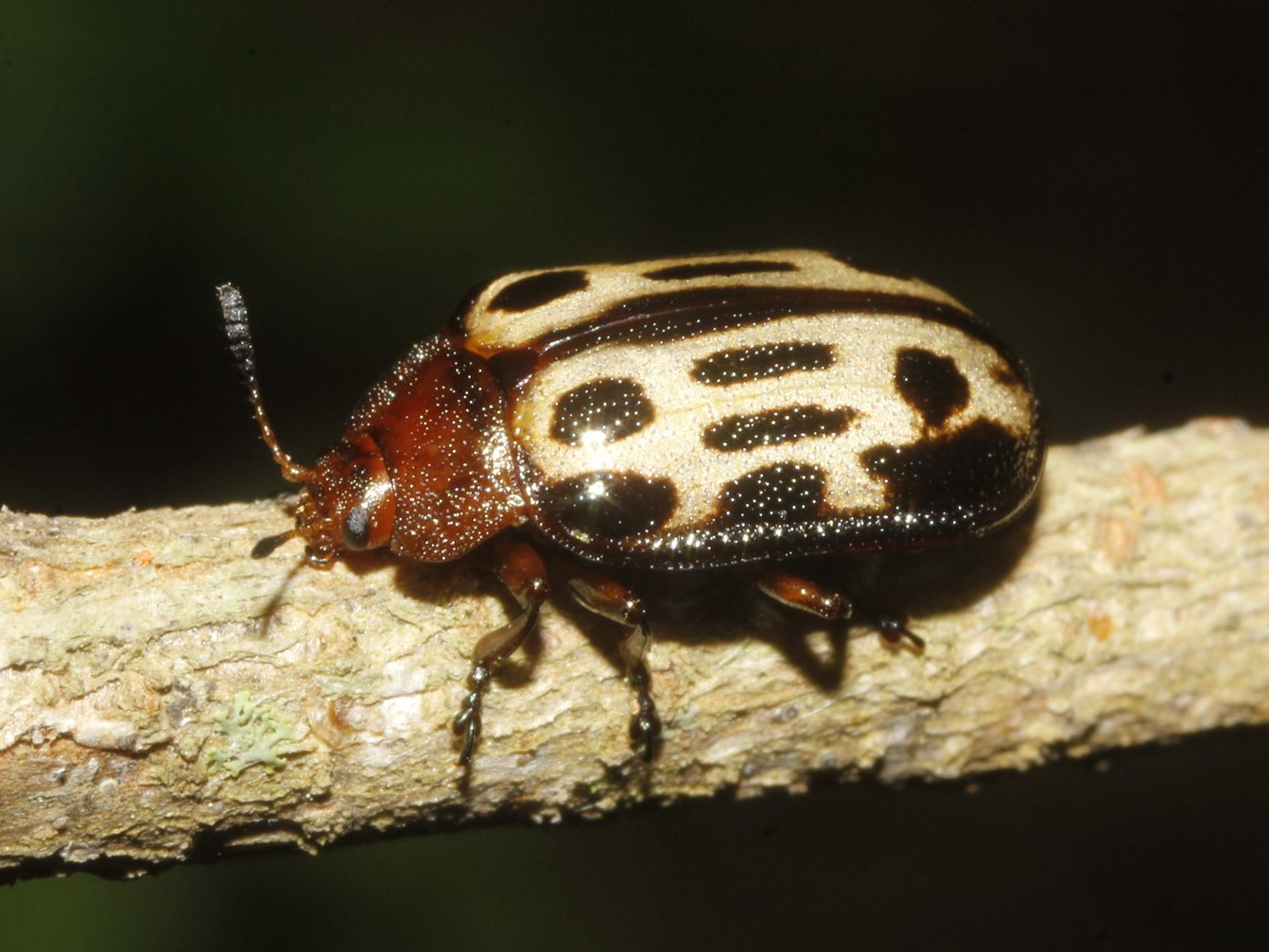

Scientific classification
- Kingdom: Animalia
- Phylum: Arthropoda
- Clade: Pancrustacea
- Class: Insecta
- Order: Coleoptera
- Suborder: Polyphaga
- Infraorder: Cucujiformia
- Family: Chrysomelidae
- Genus: Chrysomela
- Species: C. texana

Binomial name
- Chrysomela texana (Schaeffer, 1920)

= Chrysomela texana =

Species of beetle

Chrysomela texana, the red-headed willow leaf beetle, is a species of leaf beetle in the family Chrysomelidae. It is found in Central America and North America.
