= Chrysomela lineatopunctata =

Scientific classification
- Kingdom: Animalia
- Phylum: Arthropoda
- Clade: Pancrustacea
- Class: Insecta
- Order: Coleoptera
- Suborder: Polyphaga
- Infraorder: Cucujiformia
- Family: Chrysomelidae
- Genus: Chrysomela
- Species: C. lineatopunctata

Binomial name
- Chrysomela lineatopunctata Forster, 1771

Species of beetle

Chrysomela lineatopunctata is a species of leaf beetle in the family Chrysomelidae. It is found in North America.
