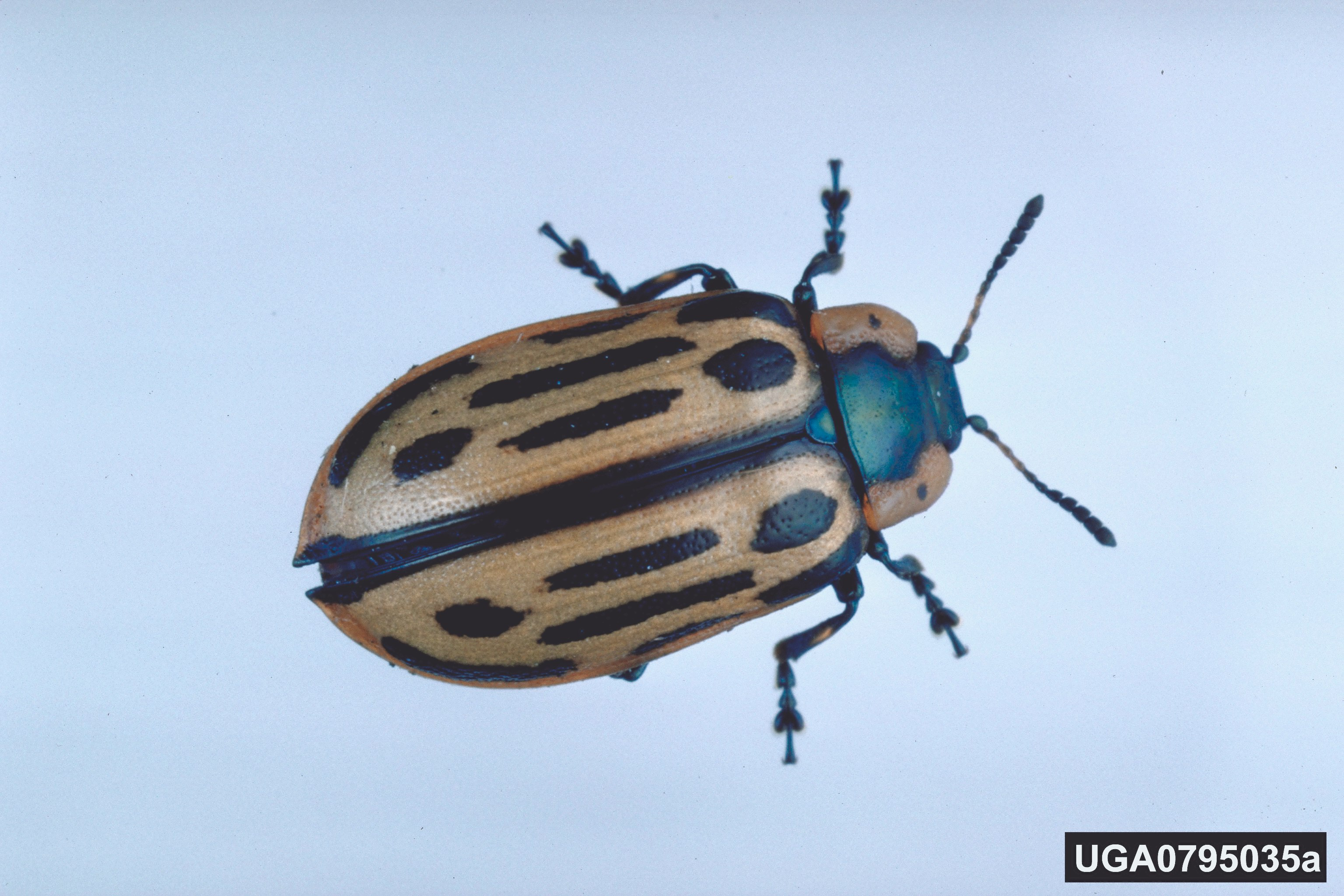

Scientific classification
- Kingdom: Animalia
- Phylum: Arthropoda
- Clade: Pancrustacea
- Class: Insecta
- Order: Coleoptera
- Suborder: Polyphaga
- Infraorder: Cucujiformia
- Family: Chrysomelidae
- Genus: Chrysomela
- Species: C. scripta

Binomial name
- Chrysomela scripta Fabricius, 1801

= Chrysomela scripta =

Species of beetle

Chrysomela scripta, the cottonwood leaf beetle, is a species of leaf beetle in the family Chrysomelidae. It is found in Central America and North America.

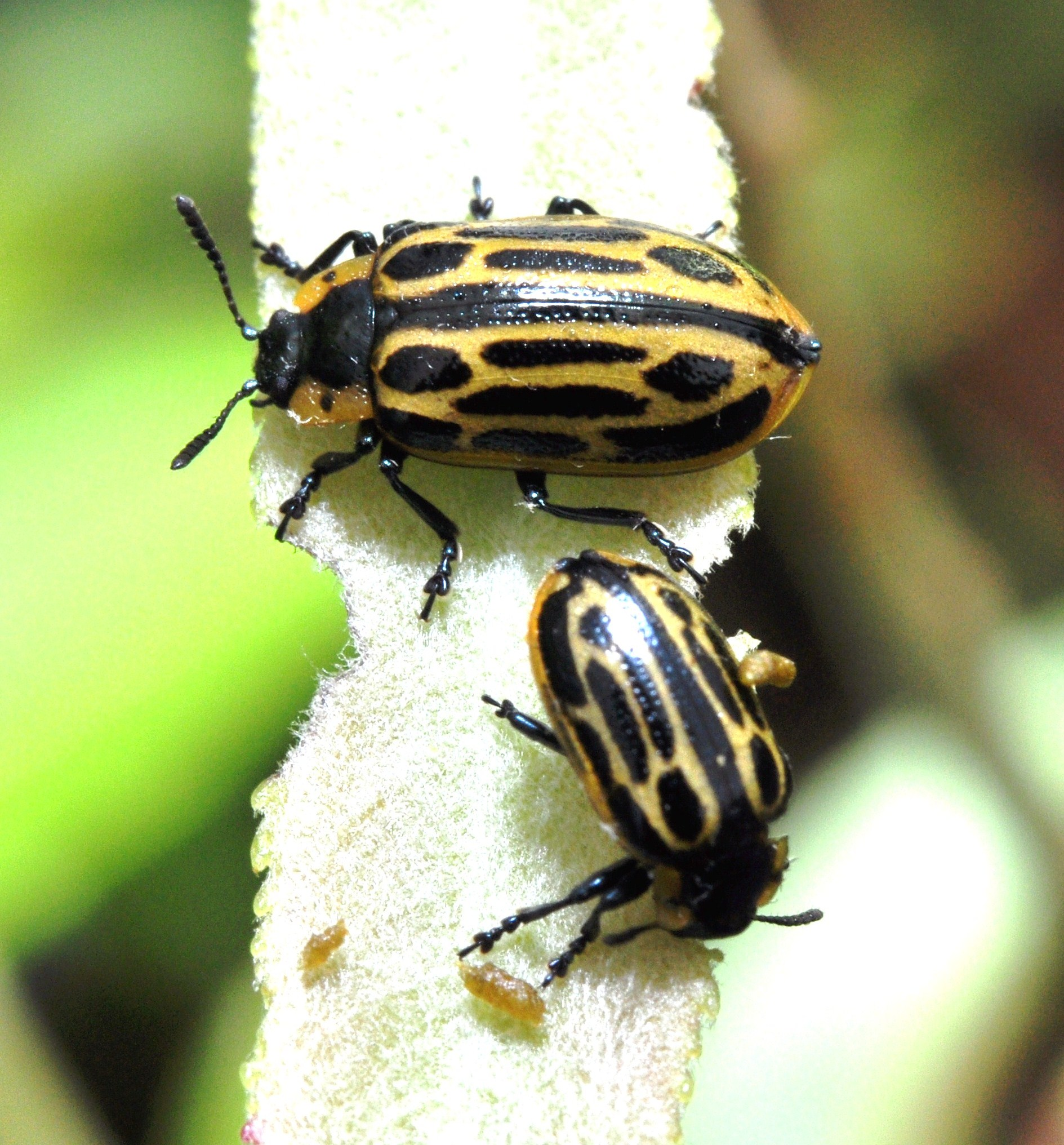
Cottonwood leaf beetle, Chrysomela scripta
