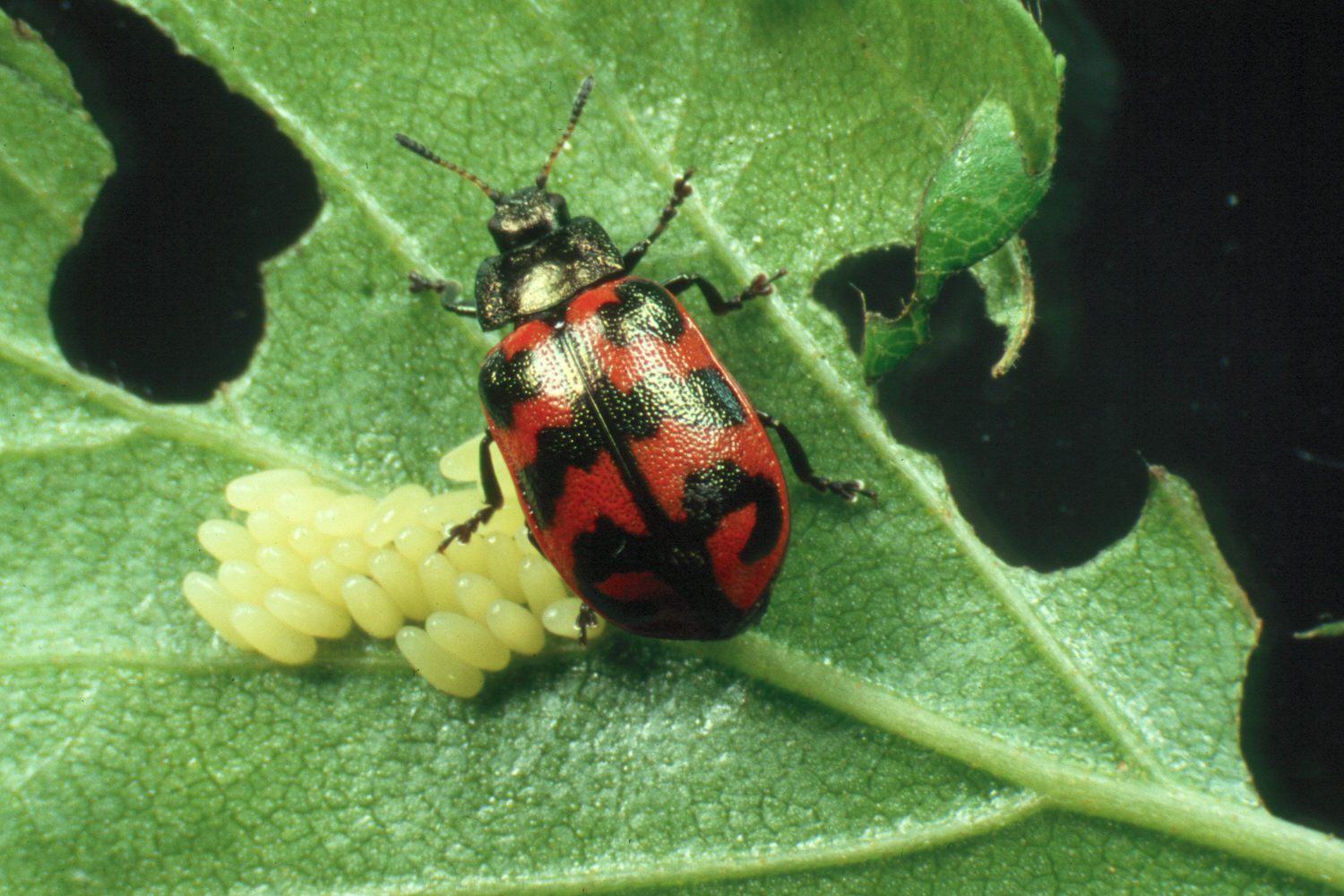
- Female Chrysomela lapponica depositing eggs on a birch leave (Czech Republic)

Scientific classification
- Kingdom: Animalia
- Phylum: Arthropoda
- Clade: Pancrustacea
- Class: Insecta
- Order: Coleoptera
- Suborder: Polyphaga
- Infraorder: Cucujiformia
- Family: Chrysomelidae
- Genus: Chrysomela
- Species: C. lapponica

Binomial name
- Chrysomela lapponica Linnaeus, 1758

= Chrysomela lapponica =

Species of beetle

Chrysomela lapponica is a species of leaf beetle found in central and northern Europe feeding on leaves of willows and birch. The adult beetles are about 8 mm long and beetles in different regions can have different colour patterns on their elytra.

== Colour forms and host plants ==
Beetles from different populations can be distinct in their biology, like coloration or behaviour. The larvae and adults from northern Europe (e.g. Finland, Sweden, Norway, Russia, and the Baltic states) feed and oviposit only on some willow species. The Central European populations, which are patchily distributed in Germany, Czech Republic, Poland, northern Italy and France, are mostly monophagous on birch. Development of the insect is impaired if beetles are reared on their non-natural host, that is beetles from northern Europe are fed with birch leaves, or beetles from Central Europe with willow leaves. The elytra colouration consists of red and black marks. Black marks predominate in the northern populations while in the central European population the colours red and black are about equally represented on the elytra. The darker forms heat up more quickly and might be an adaptation to the colder environment in northern Europe.

== Pest status ==
In the Kola Peninsula of north-west Russia, outbreaks of Chrysomela lapponica resulted in severe defoliation of the willow species Salix borealis in August 1993 and then again in 1994 and 1995. Studies showed that plants stressed by defoliation the previous year were less favourable for the development of the leaf beetles. Therefore, the decline of the outbreaks appears to be linked to the development of resistance in the willow hosts.

== Natural enemies ==
Like other insects, Chrysomela lapponica is attacked by a variety of natural enemies, mainly other types of insects which prey on or parasitize the larvae. Chrysomela lapponica has developed defenses against such natural enemies. The larvae possess defensive glands filled with volatile compounds which deter attacking natural enemies and have antimicrobial activity. There are also differences in the chemical composition of these defensive compounds among geographically separated populations, apparently linked to the host plant the beetles feed on. Although the defensive compounds are usually repellents, some natural enemies are actually attracted to them and use them to locate their prey or host. This has been shown for the predaceous hoverfly Parasyrphus nigritarsis and the phorid fly Megaselia opacicornis.
