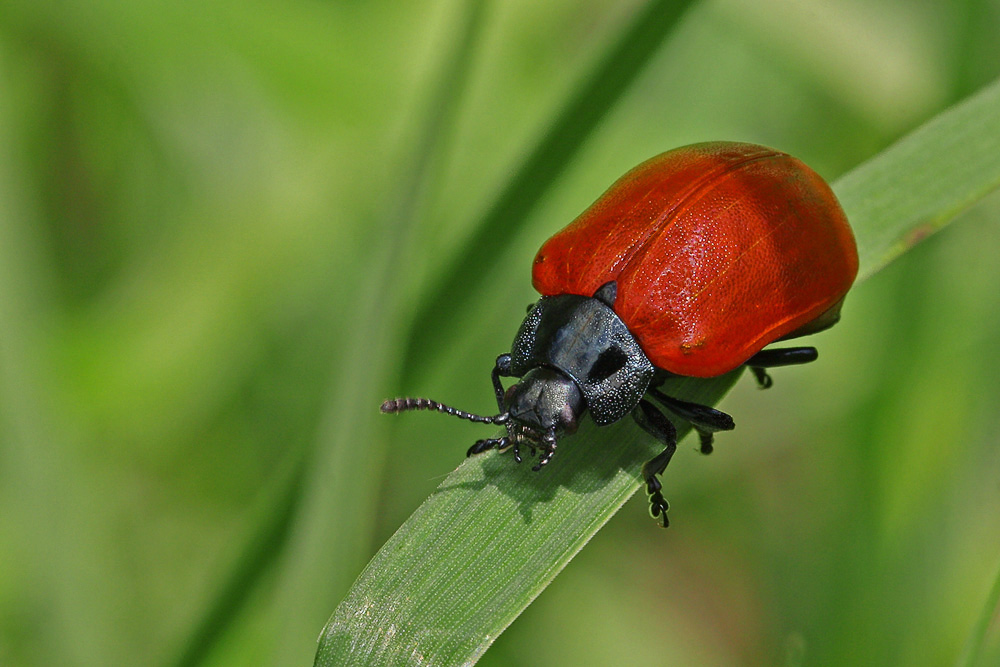
- Chrysomela populi

Scientific classification
- Kingdom: Animalia
- Phylum: Arthropoda
- Clade: Pancrustacea
- Class: Insecta
- Order: Coleoptera
- Suborder: Polyphaga
- Infraorder: Cucujiformia
- Family: Chrysomelidae
- Subfamily: Chrysomelinae
- Tribe: Chrysomelini
- Genus: Chrysomela; Linnaeus, 1758

Type species
- Chrysomela populi Linnaeus, 1758

Synonyms
- Lina Latreille, 1829; Eleia Gistel, 1848; Gymnota Gistel, 1848 (nec Gistel, 1834); Ernobia Gistel, 1856; Melasoma Stephens, 1831; Microdera Stephens, 1839 (nec Eschscholtz, 1831); Macrolina Motschulsky, 1860; Strickerus Lucas, 1920; Pachylina Medvedev & Chernov, 1969

= Chrysomela =

Genus of beetles

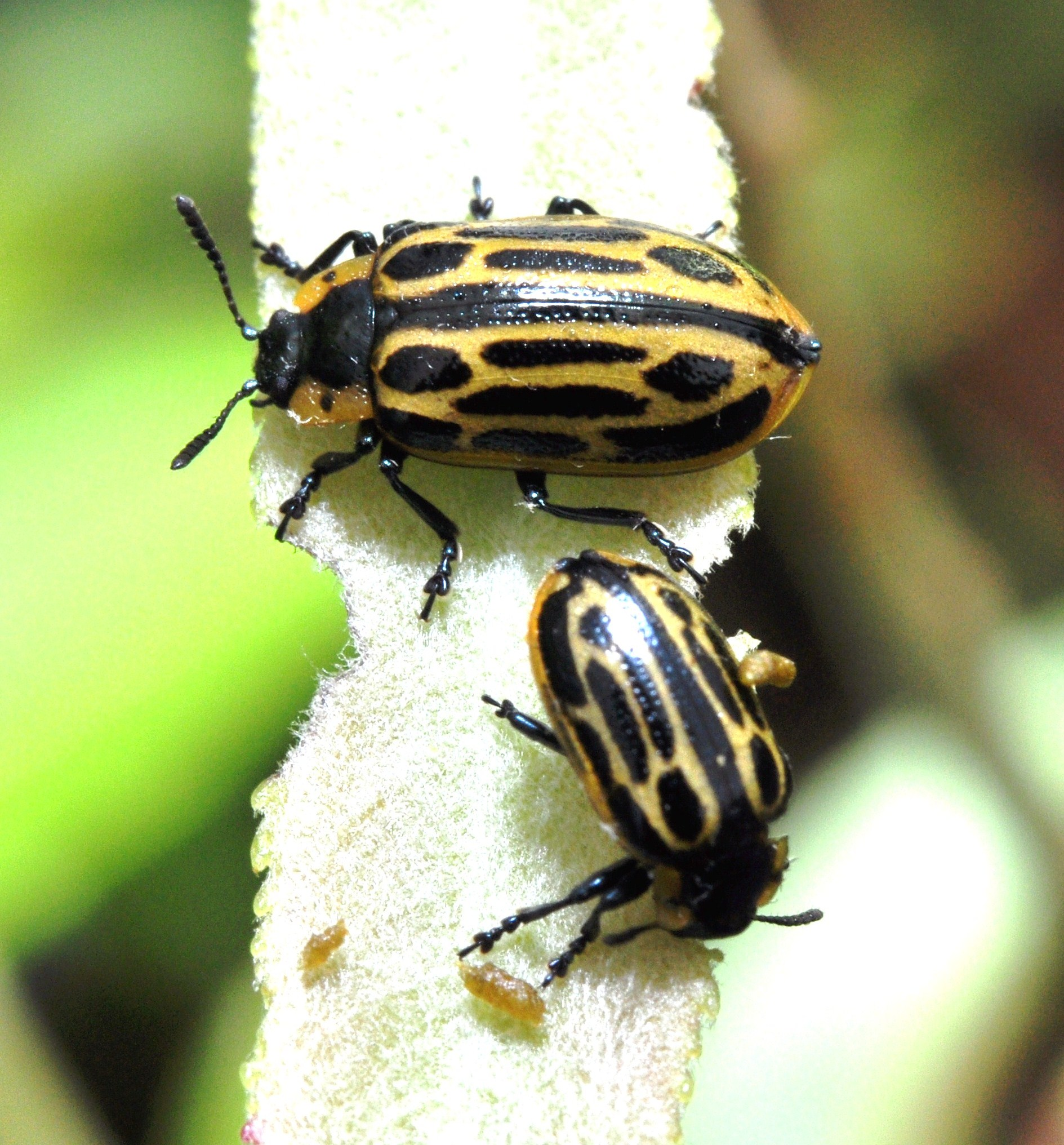
Chrysomela scripta

Chrysomela is a genus of leaf beetles found almost throughout the world, but not in Australia. It contains around 40 species, including 7 in eastern and northern Europe. It also includes at least 17 species in North America, including the cottonwood leaf beetle Chrysomela scripta.

== Taxonomy ==
Chrysomela is traditionally broken up into three subgenera, Chrysomela, Macrolina (or Strickerus) and Pachylina. In 1998, researchers Maurizio Biondi and Mauro Daccordi proposed a new classification of Chryomela without any subgenera. This was followed by the sixth volume of the Catalogue of Palaearctic Coleoptera.

== Species ==
These 27 species belong to the genus Chrysomela:

- Chrysomela aeneicollis (Schaeffer, 1928)^{i c g b} – Canada, United States
- Chrysomela collaris Linnaeus, 1758^{g}
  - Chrysomela collaris alpina Zetterstedt, 1838 – Norway, Sweden
  - Chrysomela collaris blaisdelli (Van Dyke, 1938) – Canada, United States (Alaska)
  - Chrysomela collaris collaris Linnaeus, 1758 – Europe, Asia
  - Chrysomela collaris hyperborea Medvedev & Khruleva, 2011 – Russian Far East (Chukchi Peninsula, northeast Yakutia)
- Chrysomela confluens Rogers, 1856^{i c g b} – Canada, United States
- Chrysomela crotchi Brown, 1956^{i c g b} (aspen leaf beetle) – Canada, United States
- Chrysomela cuprea Fabricius, 1775^{g} – Europe, Asia
- Chrysomela cyaneoviridis Gruev, 1994
- Chrysomela falsa Brown, 1956^{i c g b} – Canada, United States
- Chrysomela interrupta Fabricius, 1801^{i c g b} (alder leaf beetle) – United States
- Chrysomela invicta Brown, 1956^{i c g} – Canada, United States
- Chrysomela knabi Brown, 1956^{i c g b} – Canada, United States
- Chrysomela lapponica Linnaeus, 1758^{g} – Europe, Asia
- Chrysomela laurentia Brown, 1956^{i c g b} – Canada, United States
- Chrysomela lineatopunctata Forster, 1771^{i c g b} – Canada, United States
- Chrysomela mainensis J. Bechyné, 1954^{i c g b} – Canada, United States
- Chrysomela populi Linnaeus, 1758^{g} – Europe, Asia
- Chrysomela saliceti (Weise, 1884)^{g}
  - Chrysomela saliceti afghanica (Reineck, 1937) – Afghanistan
  - Chrysomela saliceti quadricollis (Jakob, 1955) – Central Asia
  - Chrysomela saliceti saliceti (Weise, 1884) – Europe, Asia
  - Chrysomela saliceti turcestanica (Reineck, 1937) – Afghanistan, Northwest China (Xinjiang), Central Asia
- Chrysomela salicivorax (Jakob, 1953) – China, South Korea
- Chrysomela schaefferi Brown, 1956^{i c g b} – Canada, United States
- Chrysomela scripta Fabricius, 1801^{i c g b} (cottonwood leaf beetle) – Canada, United States, Mexico
- Chrysomela semota Brown, 1956^{i c g b} – Canada, United States
- Chrysomela sonorae Brown, 1956^{i c g b} – United States (Arizona), Mexico
- Chrysomela taimyrensis Medvedev & Chernov, 1969 – Russia (Taymyr Peninsula)
- Chrysomela texana (Schaeffer, 1920)^{i c g b} (red-headed willow leaf beetle) – United States (Texas), Mexico
- Chrysomela tremula Fabricius, 1787^{g}
  - Chrysomela tremula selengensis (Jakob, 1953) – Russia (East Siberia)
  - Chrysomela tremula tremula Fabricius, 1787 – Europe, Asia
- Chrysomela vigintipunctata (Scopoli, 1763)^{g}
  - Chrysomela vigintipunctata alticola Wang, 1992 – China
  - Chrysomela vigintipunctata vigintipunctata (Scopoli, 1763) – Europe, Asia
- Chrysomela walshi Brown, 1956^{i c g} – Canada
- Chrysomela wrangeliana Medvedev, 1973 – Russia (Wrangel Island)

Data sources: i = ITIS, c = Catalogue of Life, g = GBIF, b = Bugguide.net
