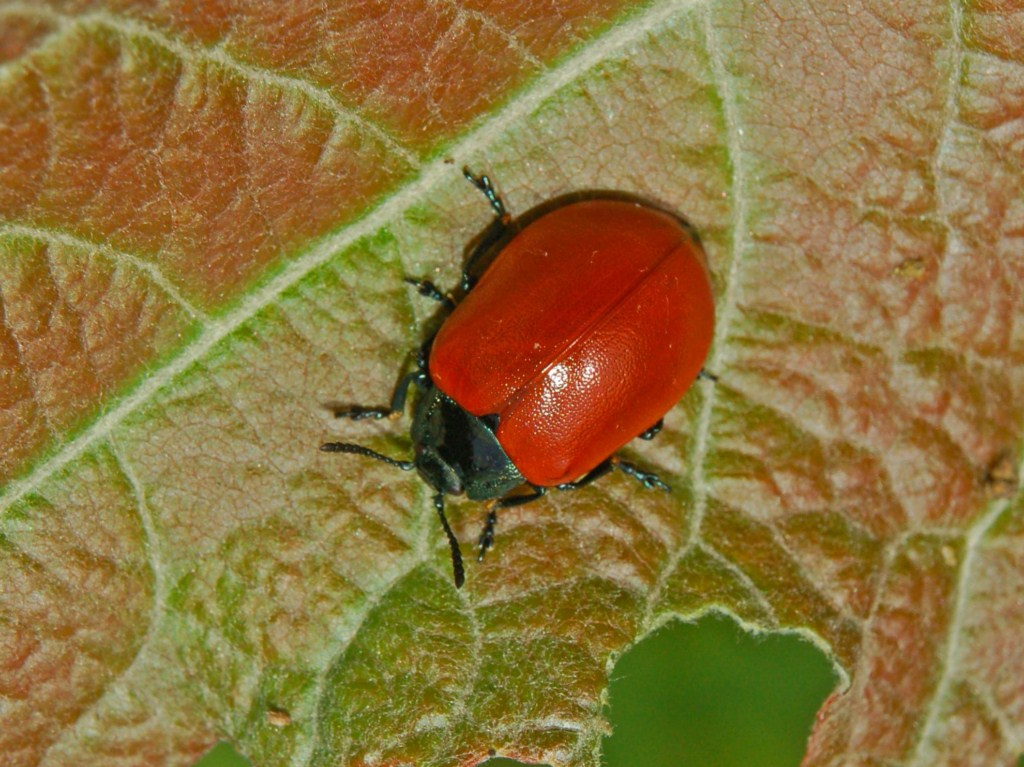
- Dorsal view

Scientific classification
- Kingdom: Animalia
- Phylum: Arthropoda
- Clade: Pancrustacea
- Class: Insecta
- Order: Coleoptera
- Suborder: Polyphaga
- Infraorder: Cucujiformia
- Family: Chrysomelidae
- Subfamily: Chrysomelinae
- Tribe: Chrysomelini
- Genus: Chrysomela
- Species: C. populi

Binomial name
- Chrysomela populi Linnaeus, 1758

Synonyms
- Chrysomela populi violaceicollis Bechyné, 1954; Melasoma parvicollis Jakob, 1955; Melasoma populi (Linnaeus, 1758); Melasoma populi asiatica Jakob, 1952; Melasoma populi nigricollis Jakob, 1952; Melasoma populi kitaica Jakob, 1952

= Chrysomela populi =

Species of beetle

Chrysomela populi, commonly known as the poplar leaf beetle, is a species of broad-shouldered leaf beetle belonging to the family Chrysomelidae, subfamily Chrysomelinae.

== Background ==
There are more than 25 thousand species of Chrysomelidae in the world. Many of its species carry the reputation of being agricultural and forest pests and Chrysomela populi is one of the most important and populous species of this group. C. populi is a broad-shouldered leaf beetle belonging to the family Chrysomelidae and subfamily Chrysomelinae. The species inhabits plant species of the family Salicacae and its activity favors moderate winters and dry, warm springs. Increased food quality and favorable living conditions has led to an increase in the population density of Chrysomelidae, including C. populi. C. populi have been commonly spotted in Eastern Europe and can be found throughout Asia. Specifically, they can be found living on species of Salix, like S. triandra, S. fragilis and S. viminali, and Populus, such as P. tremula, P. alba, and P. nigra.

C. populi selects hosts based on nutrient content and proportion, and it generally has high requirements for food quality. C. populi leaves behind irregular remains along the plant veins and leaf edges of the vegetation it has consumed. After feeding for several days, adult beetles copulate and females lay their first eggs. During copulation, females continue consuming food and males duel other copulating males with their mandibles in an attempt to drive them away from the females. The lifespan of C. populi depends on the nutrient availability of its host species. In undernourished conditions, females lay less eggs on average then they would under standard consumption.

C. populi has garnered the reputation of being a pest to numerous, key species for forestry and it can be found all over Europe. For example, C. populi is harmful pest of poplar. Its feeding can cause significant damage that hinders the growth of the plants, especially on seedlings. Large and prolonged feeding by C. populi can result in delayed appearance of foliage or in the death of the tree.

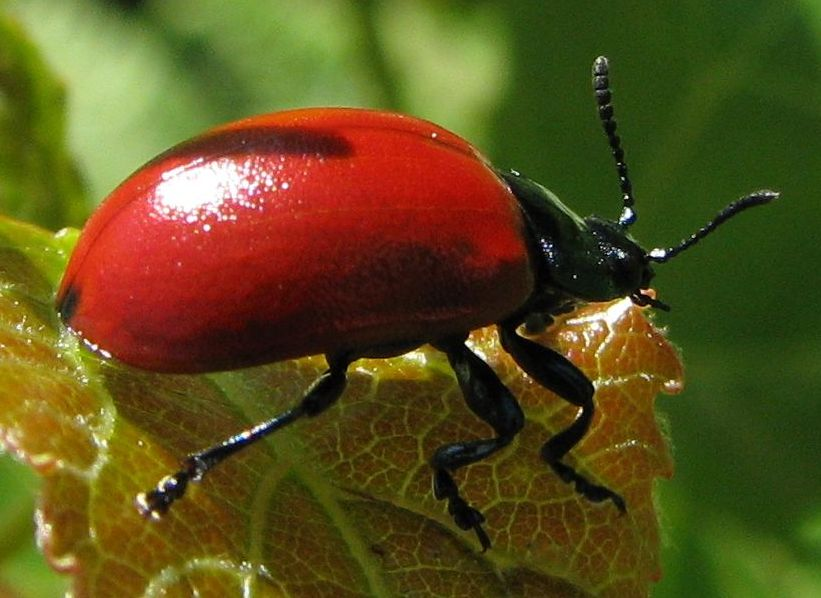
Side view. Notice the small black spot on the hindside

== Description ==
=== Larva description ===
The larvae of the species is white or light grey coloured with black dots.

=== Adult description ===
Chrysomela populi can reach a length of about 9–13 mm. The female is slightly larger than the male. These beetles show a black, dark blue or dark green body, that is round and ladybird-like. Head and pronotum are black, while elytra is bright red, with a black stain at the base. Some beetles come as orange coloured.

It can be distinguished from Chrysolina grossa by its shorter antennae and less extensive pronotum. It is also rather similar to Chrysomela saliceti and Chrysomela tremula.

== Geographic range ==
This species is one of the most widespread and frequent species of leaf beetles from the subfamily Chrysomelinae. These beetles can be found in most of Europe (Austria, Belgium, Czech Republic, France, Germany, Italy, Luxembourg, Poland, Slovakia, Switzerland), in the Palearctic realm and in the Oriental realm (Caucasus, Pakistan, Siberia, Kazakhstan, Central Asia, Far East of Russia, China and Japan).

== Habitat ==
C. populi larvae mature into adults year round. They overwinter under the bark and leaves of host species but are rarely active before April. C. populi peaks in population from May to August and endures in abundance until September or October. These beetles mainly inhabit coniferous, mixed and broad-leaved forests, forest fringes, and dry meadows with poplars and willow trees. They have been recorded to inhabit in the following willow species: S. repens. S. caprea, S. cinerea, and S. alba. It has also been observed on many saplings species, mainly P. tremula, but also P. canescens, P. nigra, P. Canadensis, and P. maximowiczii.

== Food resources ==
The overall mortality of C. populi, from larvae to adults, is significantly affected by its food source. Both the larvae and the beetles live and feed on young leaves of various plants of the Salicaceae species, especially Populus and Salix species. Adults may emit a red, highly-smelling, repellent liquid, obtained from the salicylic acid contained in their food plants.

In a study done on the correlation between food source and C. populi development and mortality, it was found that beetles living on genetically crossed clones of P. tremula x P. tremuloides (tt) plants, had the lowest mortality rate on average when compared to populations living on clones of P. alba and P. alba x P. tremula (ta). Mortality rates on clones of P. alba were found to be higher, although these rates did decrease from the first generation to the second. However, when it came to development time, offspring reared on Ptt took a longer time on average to reach adult phase than on the other two species. Additionally, progeny on clones of Pta had a significantly longer development time than on clones of P. alba.

Interestingly, adult body weight was also affected by which species of plants the beetles were reared on. Insects that fed on P. alba were significantly lighter than those on other clones, while insects that fed on Ptt were the heaviest. Heavier beetles gain a selective advantage because body weight increases fecundity in female C. populi. This was confirmed when the researchers measured longevity and found that beetles that fed on P. alba resulted in a significantly shorter longevity when compared to the other species. Progeny reared on P. alba had an average mortality rate of 42 and went up to 70 percent after 35 days of experimentation. Additionally, progeny reared on Ptt had an average mortality rate of 2.5 percent and ranged up to 27 percent.

Finally, progeny reared on Pta fell in the intermediate range with an average mortality rate of 27 percent, ranging up to 42 percent. Females feeding on Ptt laid significantly more eggs, with averages ranging from 24.7 to 33.9 eggs per female per day. In contrast, those that fed on Pta averaged 2.5 to 16.2 eggs per female per day. Females feeding on P. alba only laid a few eggs or none at all. Unsurprisingly, beetles reared on P. alba were not alive long enough to reach peak egg production.

=== Larvae ===
Adults and especially the larvae of C. populi selectively feed on the young leaves of their host plant. Observations in the field have shown that there are situations in which first instar larvae cannot find a suitable food source, for example when eggs were laid on leaves which have hardened and become unsuitable as food or if the leaves have already been consumed. In this case, first instar larvae have been observed to eat eggs that remain unhatched. Cannibalism has also been observed in situations where there is enough suitable food, but the frequency of cannibalism has not been confirmed. A study done in 2015 analyzed the effects of sibling egg cannibalism on the development and survival of a population of the beetle. It was found that egg cannibalism increases the body weight of adults and starvation tolerance of hatchlings, but does not affect development time or survival from hatchling to adult. The increased body weight gives cannibalists an adaptive significance, especially in females, because fecundity and body size are strongly correlated. Larger males may also have an advantage during mating when it comes to competing for females. However, there was no significant correlation observed between lifetime fecundity or longevity and body weight at adult emergence. Generally, the risk of a hatching larvae failing to find food is expected to be small because the leaves on which their mother oviposited guarantee a food source and the larvae will often feed there.

== Social behavior ==
=== Larval sociality ===
Larvae are gregarious, meaning they are social, in early life. Early instars will feed in groups and then disperse. This grouping behavior is commonly found in these beetles that deposit eggs in clutches. Interestingly, kin cannibalism has been reported in C. populi.

== Life history ==
=== Life cycle ===
Adults can be found from April to October. Females lay eggs in Spring, in small, irregular clusters of up to 20-30 eggs. This species has 2 to 3 generations per year. Larvae of the last generation overwinter in the litter under the leaves

C. populi mate during the spring after a feeding period when adults will consume large round holes in the foliage of developing hosts. Oviposition begins soon after this mating period and continues into the start of the summer. Eggs are laid in batches on the underside of leaves. These batches average around 20 eggs and larvae emerge from them after a 10 day period. The larvae feed on the underside of leaves, stripping them completely, and develop into adults within a month after passing through 3 instars. Mature larvae of the third instar pupate on the underside of the leaves of host or neighboring plants. Adults emanate in the Autumn, enter diapause, and then overwinter around the host plant after feeding. In the laboratory, the mean longevity of adults was observed to be longer than 50 days for both sexes at 25 celsius. New generations of adults continue in occurrence from late June into September. Adults will feed throughout through the summer but do not mate until they have overwintered.

== Reproduction ==
The female reproductive organs of Chromelidae comprises two ovaries, one of each side of the body. Each ovary has a different number of ovarioles depending on the species, size and life history of the insect. This is important because the number of ovarioles a beetle possess determines the total number of eggs that can be produced. The female reproductive system in C. populi contain a pair of ovaries, a pair of lateral oviducts, a common oviduct, and a spermatheca. Each ovary has 14 ovarioles, which can be distinguished by their light yellow color, that expand from the distal to proximal end. The parts of the ovariole, ordered from distal to proximal, include the terminal filament, germarium, vitellarium, and pedicel. Previtellogenic, vitellogenic, and chorionic oocytes can be found arranged linearly inside the vitellarium. C. populi eggs are light yellow, elongated and have been measured to be approximately 1.6 mm long and 0.6 mm wide.

The male reproductive organs are located dorsolateral to the median region of the body and includes a pair of testes, a pair of vas defferentia and efferentia, two seminal vesicles, a pair of accessory glands, an ejaculatory bulb, an ejaculatory duct and an aedeagus. The testis are approximately 1.8 mm in length and 1 mm in width and can be separated into two flowery lobes. Each testis has 20 sperm tubules that have a surface covered with a light orange peritoneal sheath. Within each testicular follicle, there are regions that are associated with different stages of development in germ cells. The growth zone is the upper spermatogonia-containing region, the maturation region is the area where spermatogonia divide and are encapsulated, and the transformation is where spermatogonia transform into spermatids and mature spermatozoa.

== Parasitism ==
Existing studies have observed the astigmatic mite Linobia coccinellae to be found regularly on populations of C. populi. These mites are milky white and have an petagonal or oval, soft idiosoma. L. coccinellae can live underneath the elytra and hind wing or under the abdomen where it consumes the host’s hemolymph. Individuals have a permanent association with their host and will reside in the same beetle for the entirety of their life cycle. The proportion of C. populi paratisized by L. coccinellae increases throughout the year and females usually experience a higher density of infestation. Severe infestations from L. coccinellae can cover majority of the abdomen of hosts and have detrimental impacts. However, feeding of these parasitic mites is too harmless to be able to kill the host. Additionally, it is not the best interest of the parasites to kill the host before it completes its own life cycle. Even though parasitism does not directly lead to increased mortality, it can impact survival directly by decreasing fecundity, reducing success in mating, and increasing stress in infected individuals.

Neogragine infection by Ophryocystis anatoliensis has also been observed in several C. populi populations. When this was first discovered, it was the first account of a Neogragarine species in any member of Chrysomelidae. The interest in studying the Neogragines largely comes from evaluating its potential in biological pest control. Neogragines are extremely pathogenic because they destroy the host’s fat body and exhaust energy stores. They lay oocysts that are uniform, navicular shapes with plugs on each of its two poles. These oocysts were commonly found in the Malpighian tubules of infected beetles. However, not much is known about how this pathogen affects C. populi in natural environments, so researchers in Turkey conducted an experiment to study their effect. Results showed that adults are more commonly infected by larvae, but larvae are more sensitive to infection. Evidence also showed that this pathogen has a high dispersal potential as infection was widespread in C. populi populations throughout Turkey.

== Gallery ==
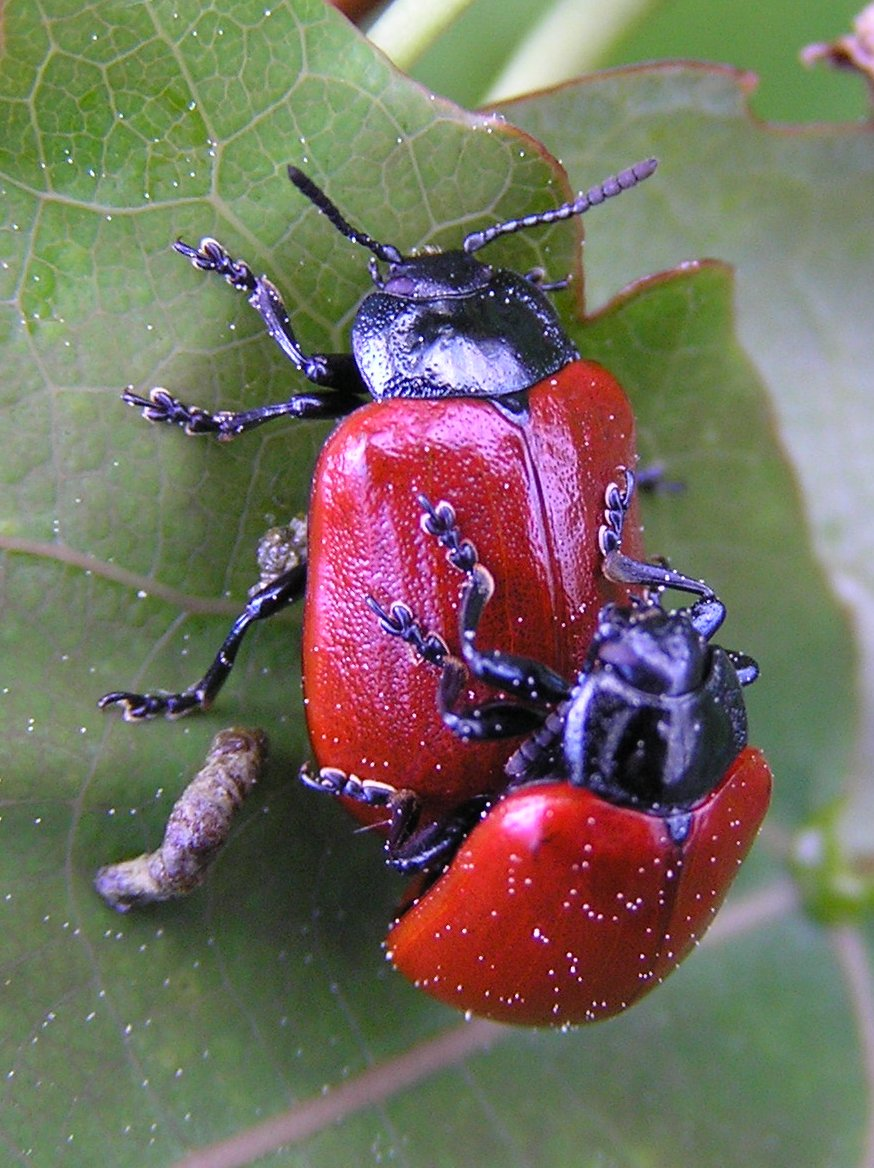
Mating pair

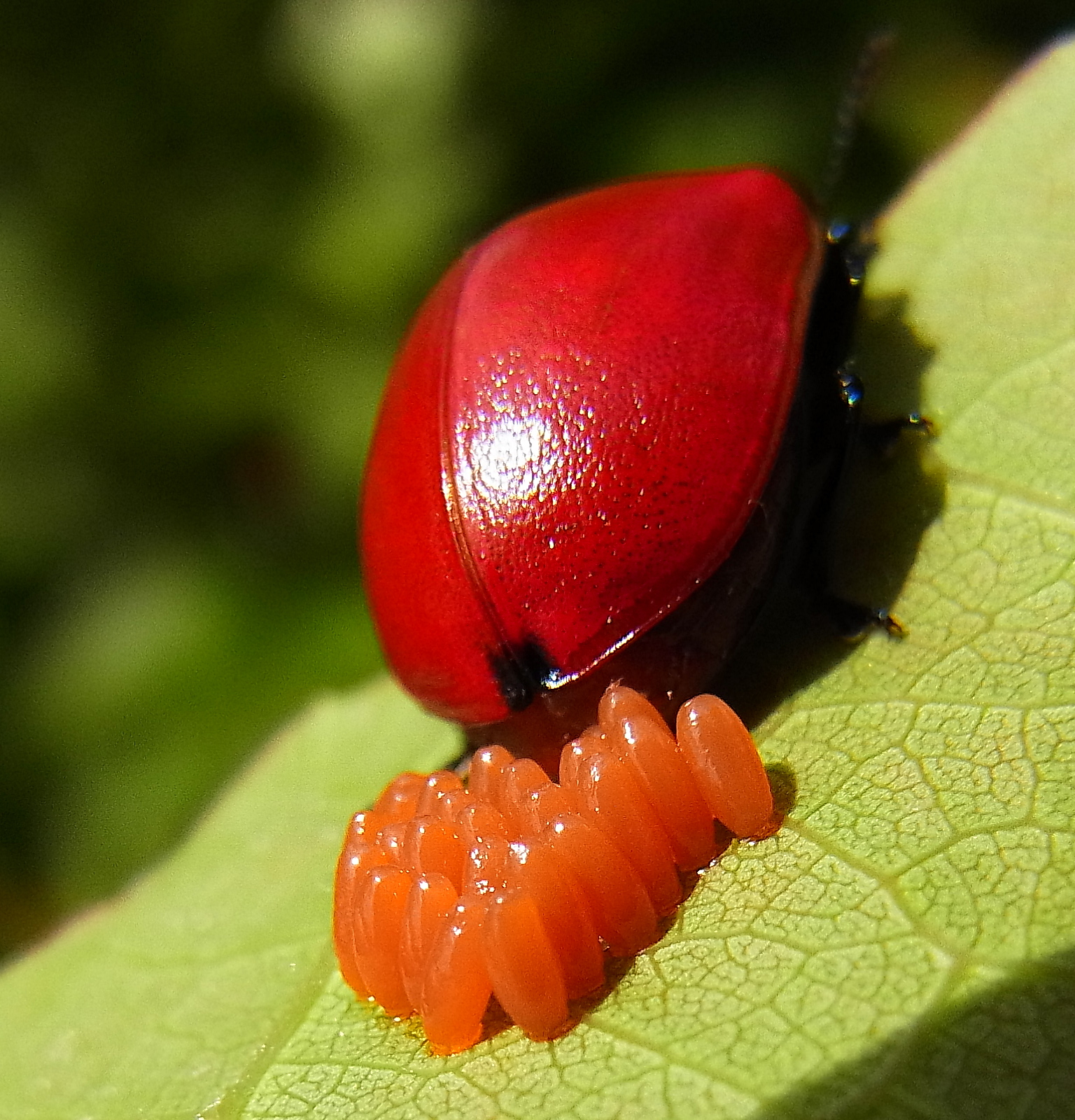
Laying of eggs

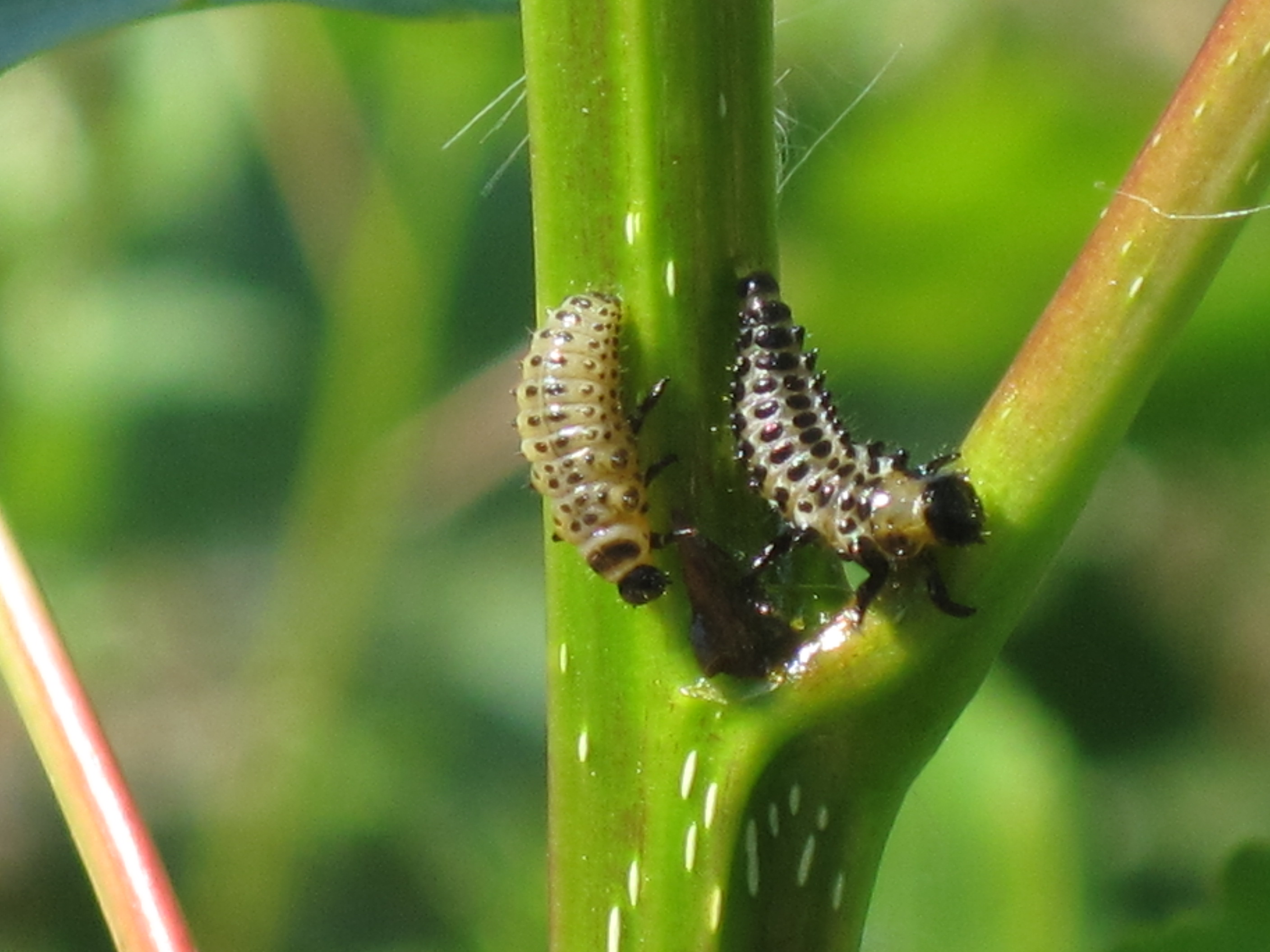
Larvae

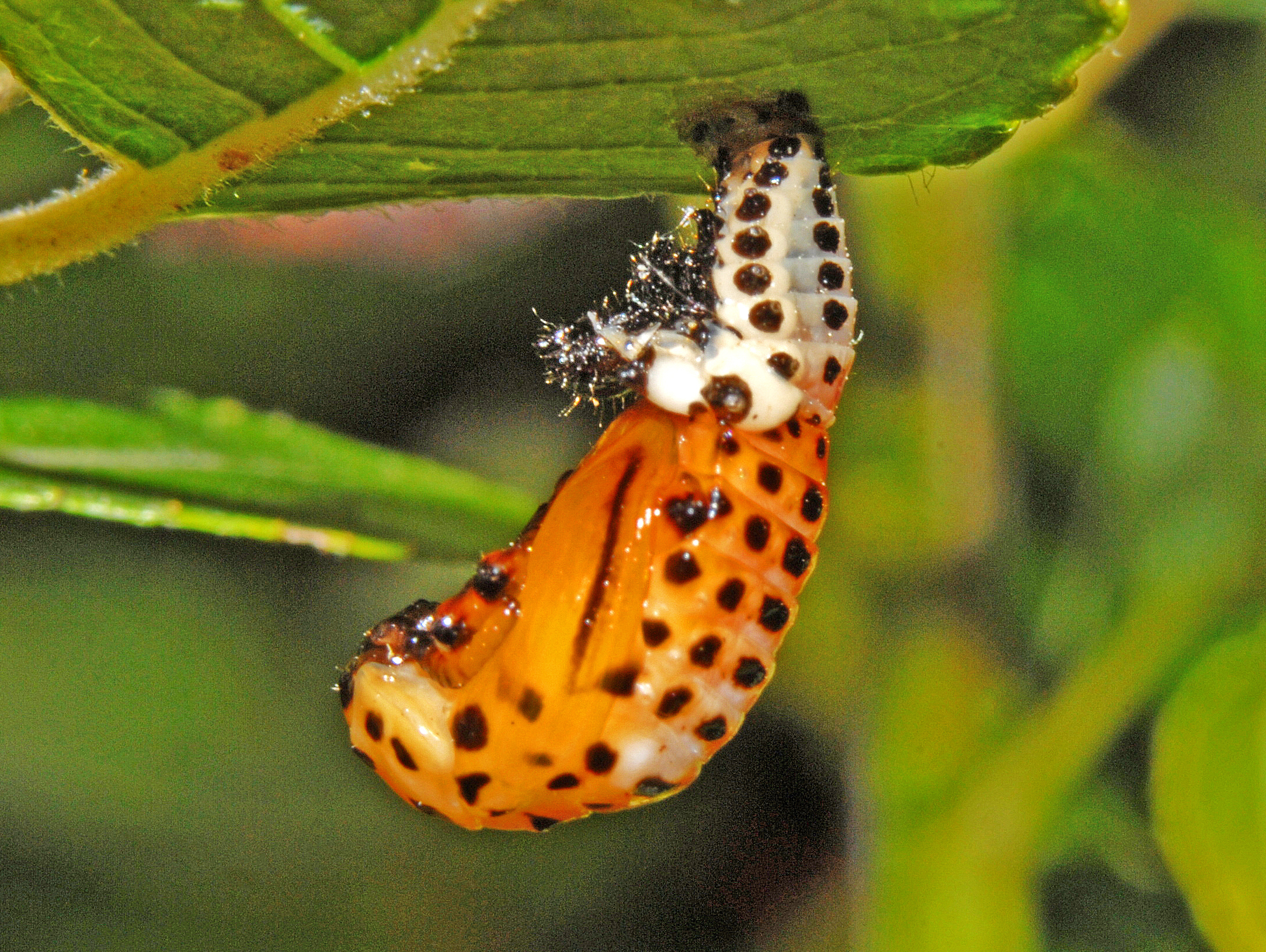
Pupa. Dorsal view
