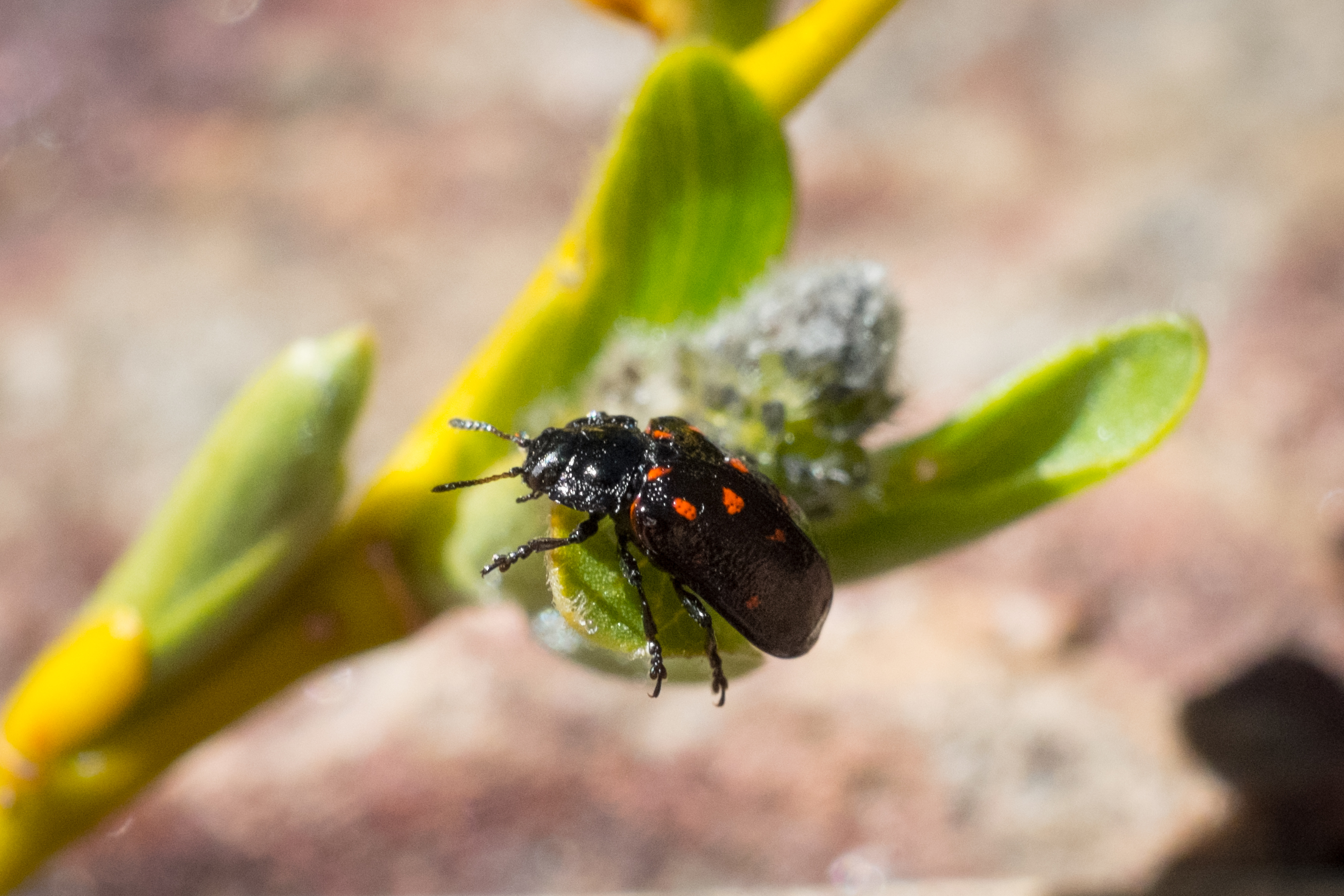

Scientific classification
- Kingdom: Animalia
- Phylum: Arthropoda
- Clade: Pancrustacea
- Class: Insecta
- Order: Coleoptera
- Suborder: Polyphaga
- Infraorder: Cucujiformia
- Family: Chrysomelidae
- Genus: Chrysomela
- Species: C. aeneicollis

Binomial name
- Chrysomela aeneicollis (Schaeffer, 1928)

= Chrysomela aeneicollis =

Species of beetle

Chrysomela aeneicollis is a species of leaf beetle in the family Chrysomelidae. This organism has been used as a model for studies of natural selection in nature. It is currently being investigated to study effects of environmental change on insect populations, and the evolutionary significance of variation at genes affecting metabolism and the response to stress. It has been included as a study species in the California Conservation Genomics Project, due to its presence in multiple California ecoregions and extensive knowledge of genetic variation, evolutionary ecology, and interactions with other species. Information about its range and comparisons with closely related species can be found in a review of the genus Chrysomela published in the Canadian Entomologist.

== Distribution ==
Chrysomela aeneicollis is found in western North America. Populations occur in cooler habitats in coastal regions from northern California to British Columbia, or at high elevations in the Rocky Mountains (Colorado, Alberta) and the Sierra Nevada mountains of California. In California, this leaf beetle occurs in the Sierra Nevada mountains from Lone Pine to Modoc County and coastal populations are found north of San Francisco in Mendocino County.

== Host plant relationships ==
Chrysomela aeneicollis belongs to a group of closely related species within the genus Chrysomela that feed on willows or poplars (family Salicaceae) or on alder or birch (family Betulaceae). As immatures (larvae), C. aeneicollis individuals use chemicals extracted from host plant foliage to produce a defensive secretion that they expose when attacked by potential predators. They prefer host willows that contain greater amounts of these chemicals (salicylate-rich) over plants that are salicylate-poor and they are stimulated to feed by salicin.

== Natural enemies and host plant use ==
The evolutionary significance of the host-plant derived defensive secretions of C. aeneicollis was investigated, with the expectation that larval survival would be greater on salicylate-rich plants than salicylate-poor ones. Field studies on C. aeneicollis revealed that specialist predators cause significant mortality, which reduces or eliminates the benefits of the host-plant derived larval defensive secretion. One of these predators is a fly (Parasyrphus melanderi) that lays its eggs on C. aeneicollis eggs. When they hatch, P. melanderi larvae feed exclusively on eggs and larvae, with no evidence that the defensive secretion repels them. The other important specialist predator is the wasp Symmorphus cristatus, which specializes on C. aeneicollis larvae in their third instar (molt). These two predators act as complementary mortality factors on C. aeneicollis larvae and constitute important components of a food web including the beetle and its natural enemies in the Sierra Nevada mountains of California.

== Genetic variation and response to heat stress along environmental gradients ==
As noted above, Chrysomela aeneicollis lives in regions with cool summertime temperatures like its close relatives in the interrupta subgenus of Chrysomela species. In montane regions of central California, populations are generally found above 2800 m and they retreat to higher elevations during dry periods. Populations at these elevations experience long winters and beetle survival depends on their ability to survive exposure to extreme cold temperatures and to survive an extended dormancy period without food. During the brief summer growing season (June to September), beetles emerge from their overwintering sites, mate, lay eggs, and undergo one generation of larval development before new adults emerge and feed for a few weeks before winter returns. Furthermore, populations at high elevations must complete their life cycle under conditions of low oxygen supply, which compounds the challenges of rapid development during the brief montane summer. These environmental challenges can impose evolutionary pressures that favor the maintenance of genetic variation (due to genotype by environment interactions) and adaptation to local environmental conditions.

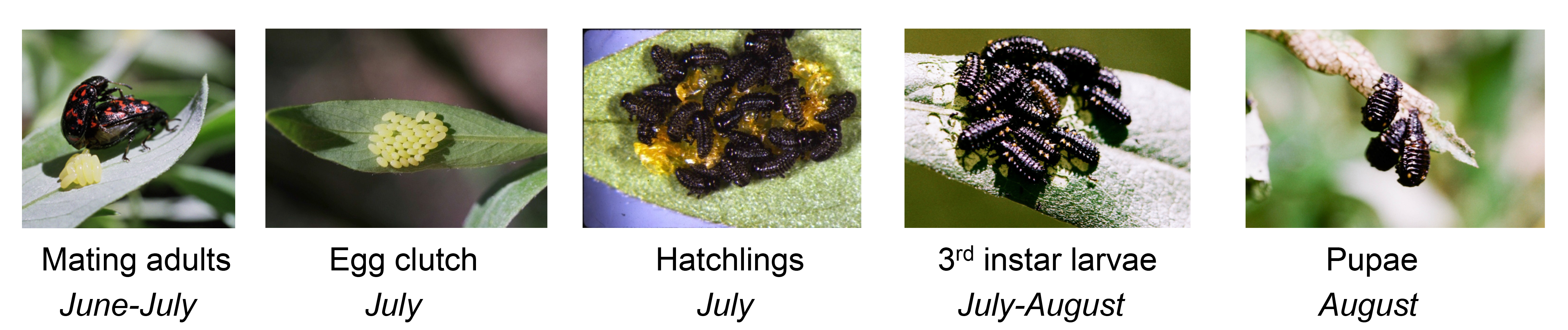
Summer life stages in montane California.

Populations in the eastern Sierra Nevada mountains show genetic differences along a latitudinal gradient that may reflect adaptation to variable temperatures and oxygen levels. Early studies used enzyme polymorphisms, which are located on genes in the nucleus and inherited according to Mendelian genetic principles, to infer differences among populations in three study drainages in the eastern Sierra Nevada mountains (Rock Creek, Bishop Creek, and Big Pine Creek). One of these enzymes, phosphoglucose isomerase (PGI), showed a steep latitudinal cline in frequency that was more pronounced than others, suggesting that PGI frequencies may be sensitive to environmental temperature. Subsequent work revealed that PGI genotypes differed with respect to expression of heat shock proteins, which help maintain functionality of other proteins and protect an organism from negative effects of heat exposure. PGI genotypes that predominate in the northern drainage Rock Creek express higher levels of heat shock proteins in nature, and they express them in the laboratory at lower temperatures, suggesting that beetles in southern populations are more heat-tolerant. Further experiments supported this hypothesis and also suggested that PGI genotype is related to tolerance to stressfully cold temperatures. Recent findings suggest that differences among populations in frequencies of mitochondrial types is also related to environmental differences in temperature and oxygen supply, and that local adaptation occurs through interactions between mitochondrial and nuclear genotype.
