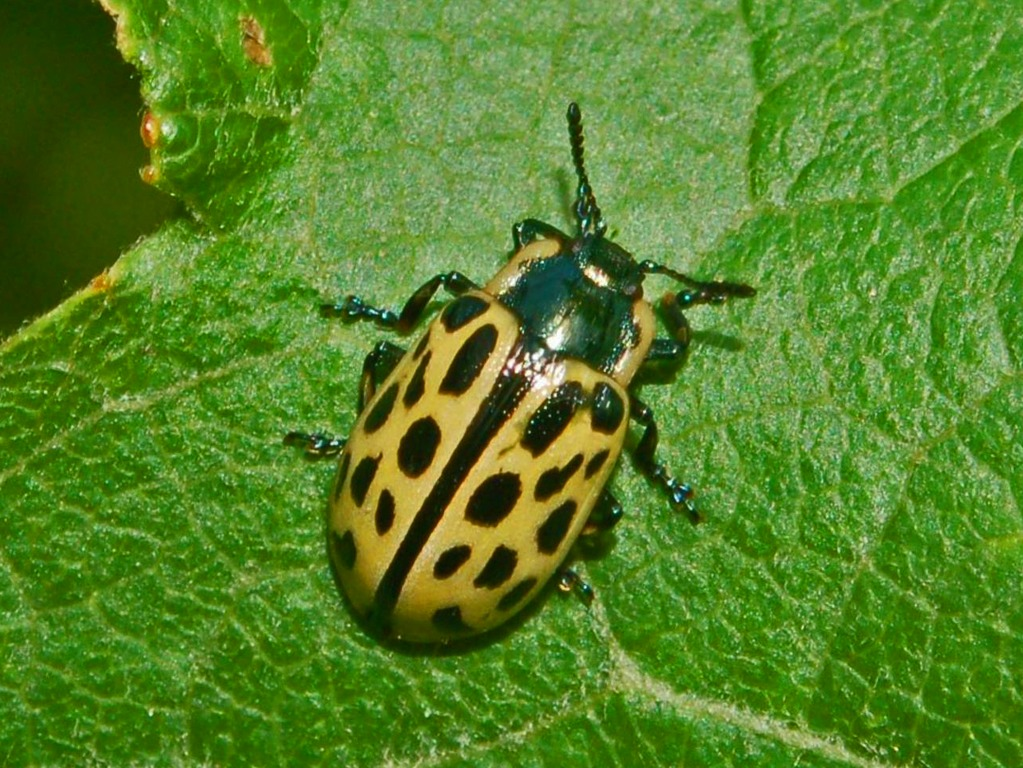
- Dorsal view
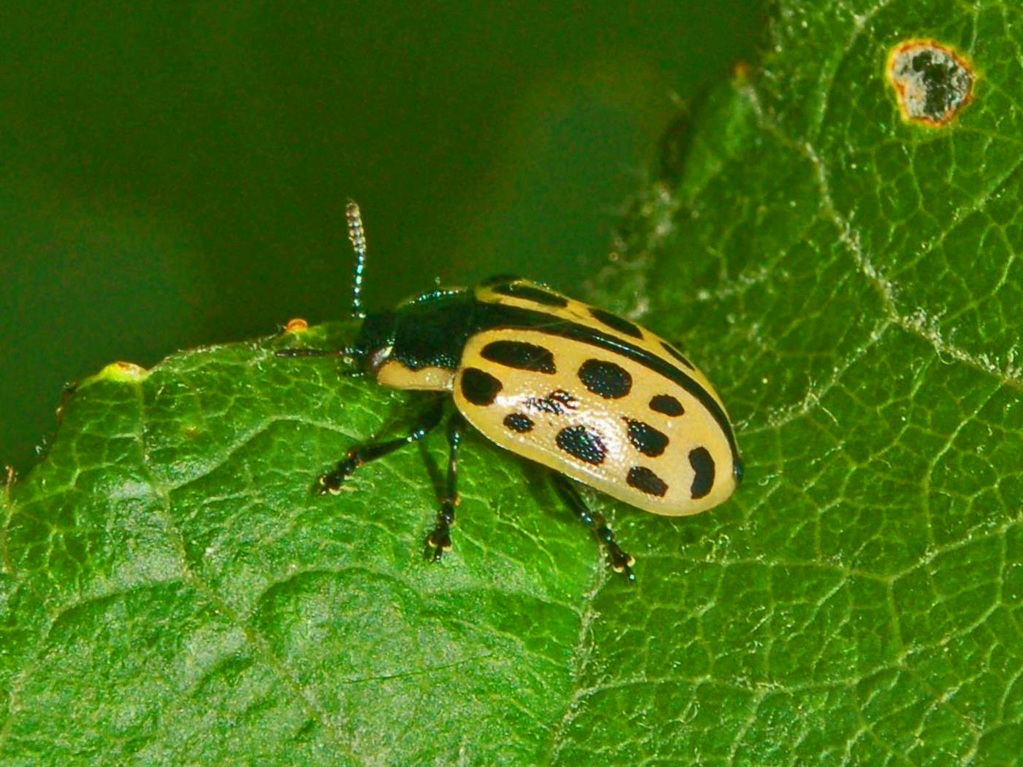
- Lateral view

Scientific classification
- Kingdom: Animalia
- Phylum: Arthropoda
- Clade: Pancrustacea
- Class: Insecta
- Order: Coleoptera
- Suborder: Polyphaga
- Infraorder: Cucujiformia
- Family: Chrysomelidae
- Subfamily: Chrysomelinae
- Tribe: Chrysomelini
- Genus: Chrysomela
- Species: C. vigintipunctata

Binomial name
- Chrysomela vigintipunctata (Scopoli, 1763)

Synonyms
- Coccinella 20-punctata Scopoli, 1763; Melasoma vigintipunctatum (Scopoli, 1763); Strickerus vigintipunctatus (Scopoli, 1763)

= Chrysomela vigintipunctata =

Species of beetle

Chrysomela vigintipunctata, or the spotted willow leaf beetle, is a species of broad-shouldered leaf beetle belonging to the family Chrysomelidae, subfamily Chrysomelinae.

The length of the beetles varies from 6.5 to 9.2 mm. Both larvae and adults feed on the leaves of its host plants, especially Salicaceae species. Elytra usually are yellowish-green, with ten black spots on each side, while the head and the pronotum are black, with yellow sides.

Beetles live mostly in forests, along lakes, swamps and feed on willow and Populus.

They are found in most of Europe, Mongolia, Russian Far East and Japan. A single dead specimen was found, for the first time in Britain, at Southwold beach, east Suffolk on 26 May 2016. A search in suitable habitat for more specimens was unsuccessful.

== Images ==
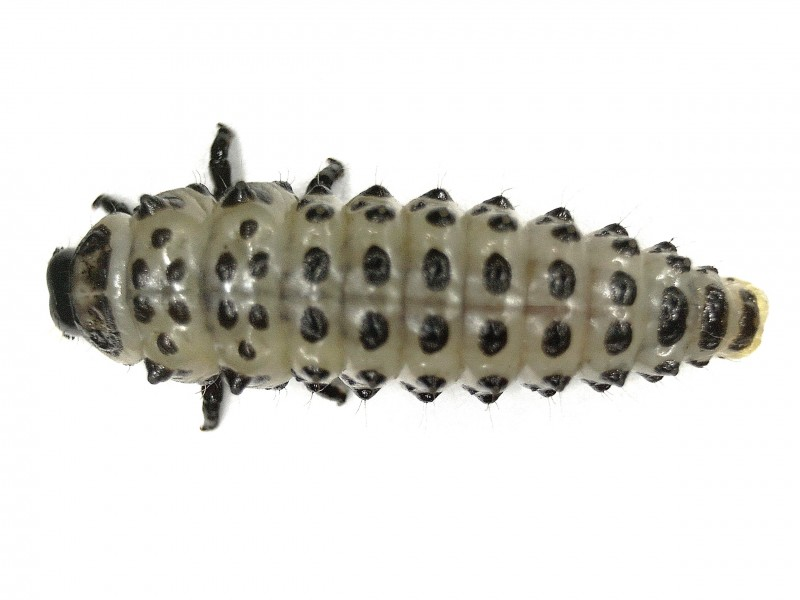
larva

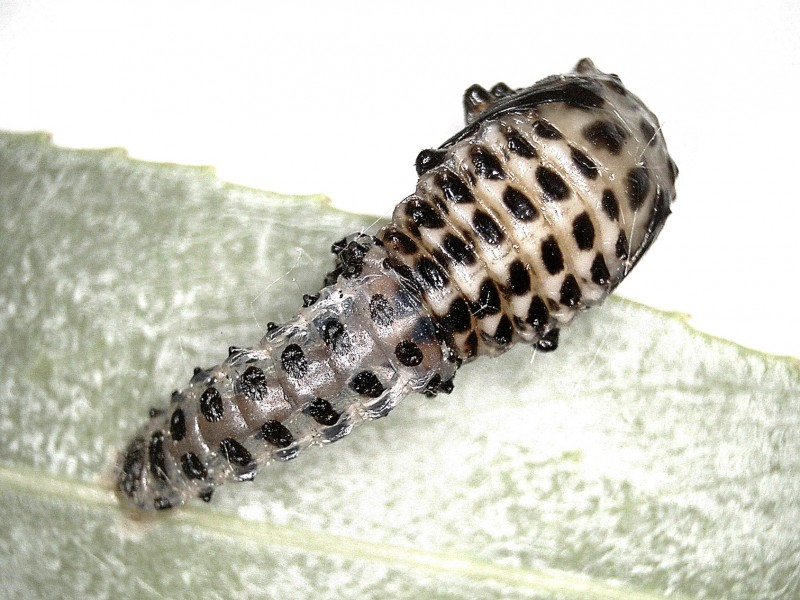
pupa

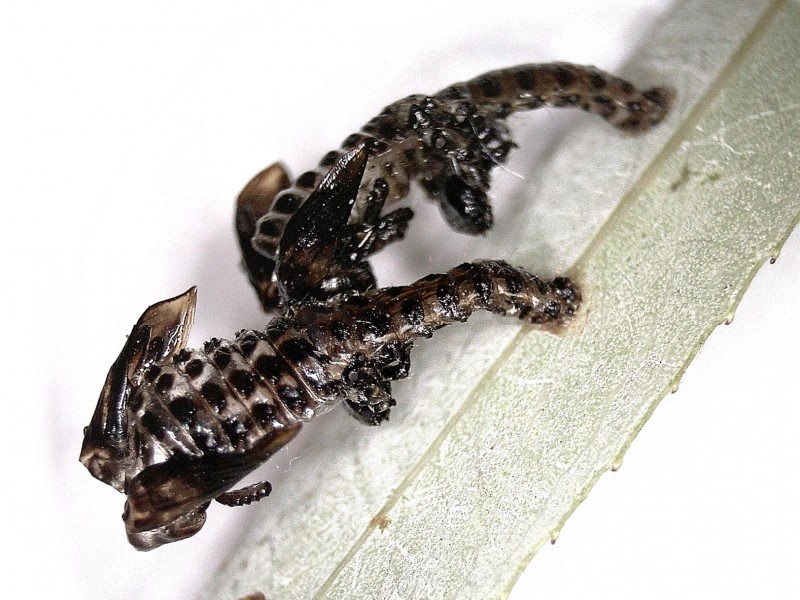
empty pupa

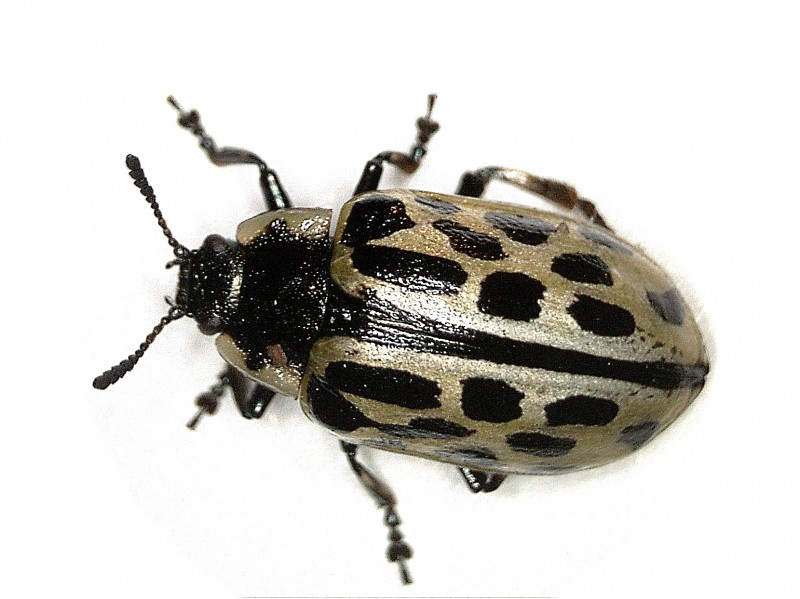
imago
