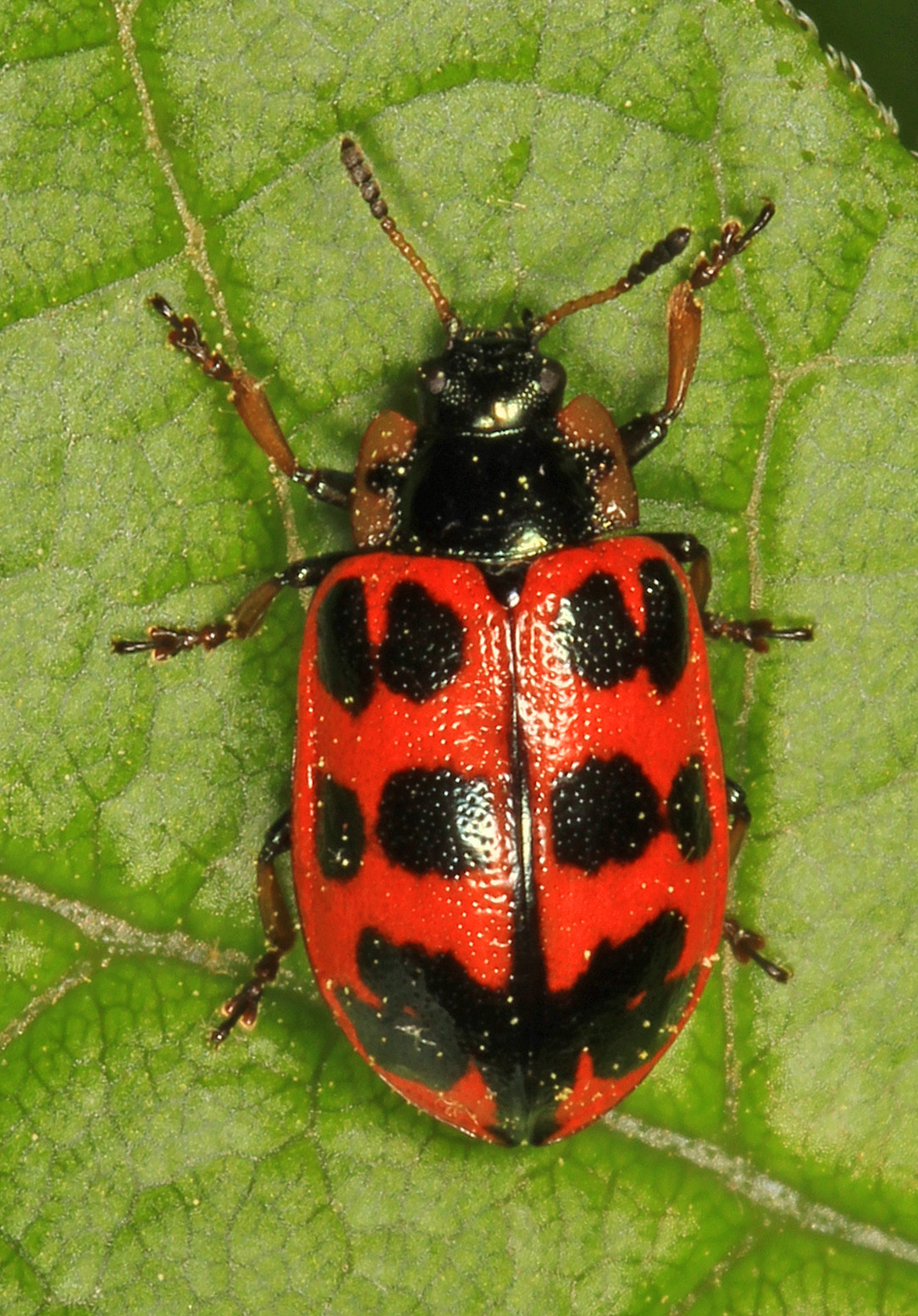

Scientific classification
- Kingdom: Animalia
- Phylum: Arthropoda
- Clade: Pancrustacea
- Class: Insecta
- Order: Coleoptera
- Suborder: Polyphaga
- Infraorder: Cucujiformia
- Family: Chrysomelidae
- Genus: Chrysomela
- Species: C. interrupta

Binomial name
- Chrysomela interrupta Fabricius, 1801

= Chrysomela interrupta =

Species of beetle

Chrysomela interrupta, the alder leaf beetle, is a species of leaf beetle in the family Chrysomelidae. It is found in North America.

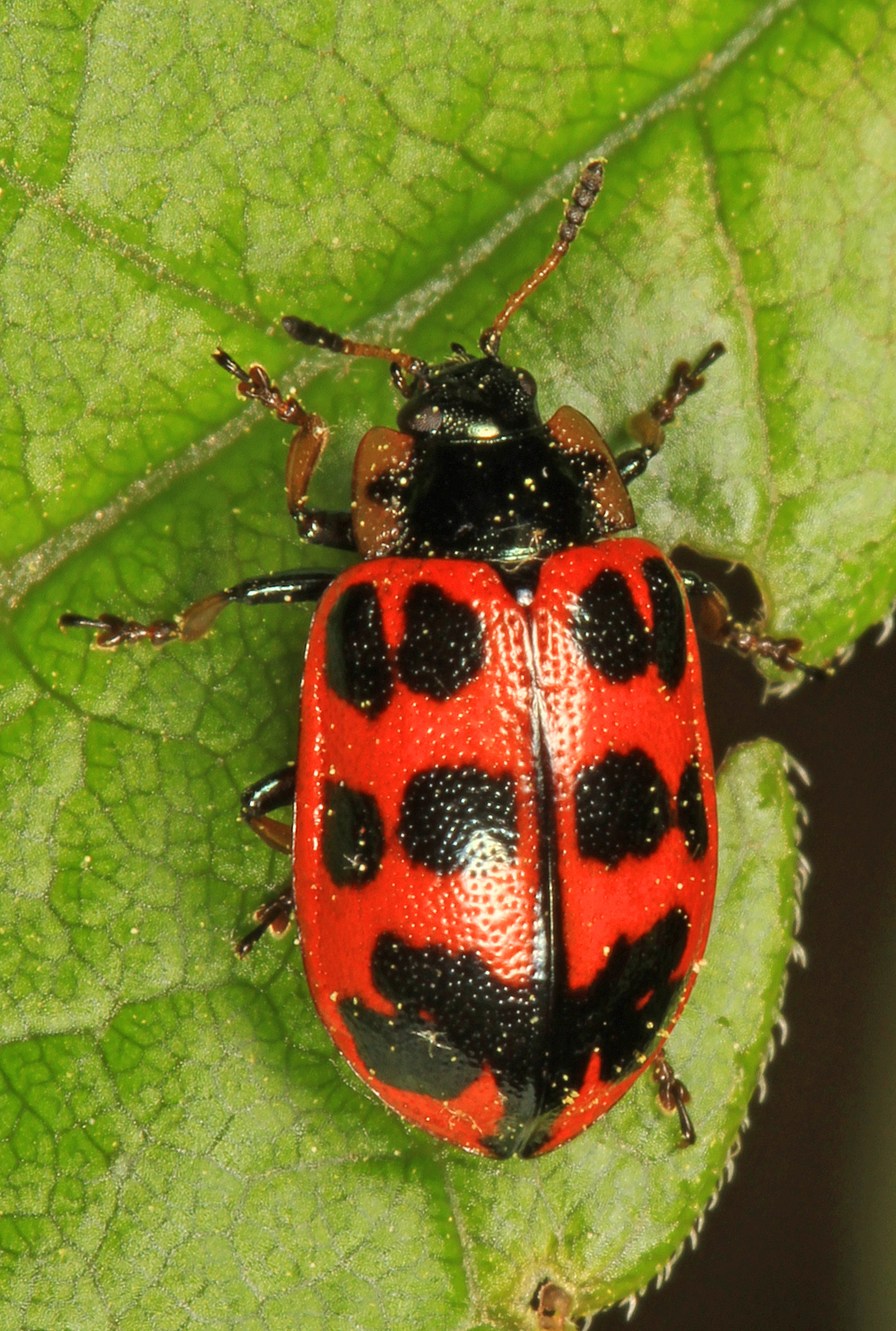
Alder leaf beetle, Chrysomela interrupta
