= Newmarket by-election =

Newmarket by-election may refer to:

- 1903 Newmarket by-election
- 1913 Newmarket by-election
