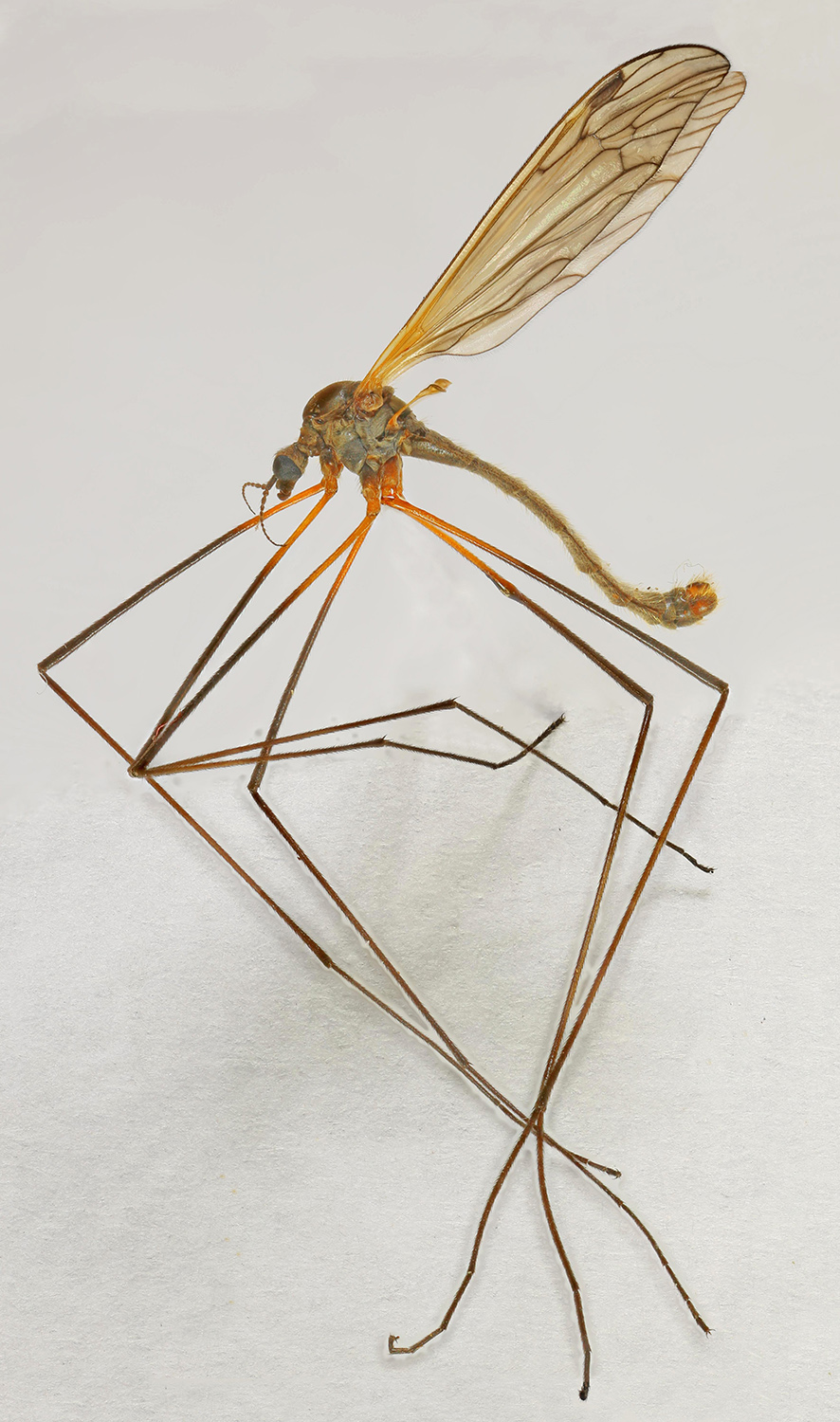
- Euphylidorea meigenii North Wales

Scientific classification
- Kingdom: Animalia
- Phylum: Arthropoda
- Class: Insecta
- Order: Diptera
- Family: Limoniidae
- Genus: Euphylidorea
- Species: E. meigenii

Binomial name
- Euphylidorea meigenii (Verrall, 1886)

= Euphylidorea meigenii =

Species of fly

Euphylidorea meigenii is a species of fly in the family Limoniidae. It is found in the Palearctic.
