= Newmarket (constituency) =

Parliamentary constituency in the United Kingdom, 1885–1918

- Former county constituency for the House of Commons

1885–1918
- Seats: one
- Created from: Cambridgeshire
- Replaced by: Cambridgeshire; Isle of Ely

Newmarket is a former United Kingdom Parliamentary constituency. It was created upon the splitting up of the three member Cambridgeshire constituency into three single member divisions in 1885. The seat was abolished in 1918.

== History ==
The Redistribution of Seats Act 1885 split the former three-member Cambridgeshire parliamentary county into three single-member divisions. One of these was the Eastern or Newmarket Division. The seat was named after the town of Newmarket, which is famous as a centre of horse racing. The seat also included the city of Ely which is the seat of a Bishop and the church interest, as well as the middle-class character of the area, contributed to Conservative political strength. The pro-Conservative alliance of the Church of England and the horse racing fraternity of the town of Newmarket was commented upon by Liberals at the time.

The seat as a whole was marginal between the Conservative and Liberal interests, as the Liberals had support in the villages. A suitable rich, horse race loving Liberal candidate could win the seat.

Upon its abolition under the Representation of the People Act 1918, the constituency was combined with the Chesterton (or West Cambridgeshire) division to create a new single member Cambridgeshire seat. Ely was combined with the Wisbech (or North Cambridgeshire) division to create a new Isle of Ely constituency. The two new seats corresponded to the administrative counties of Cambridgeshire and Isle of Ely, which had been created in 1889.

== Boundaries ==
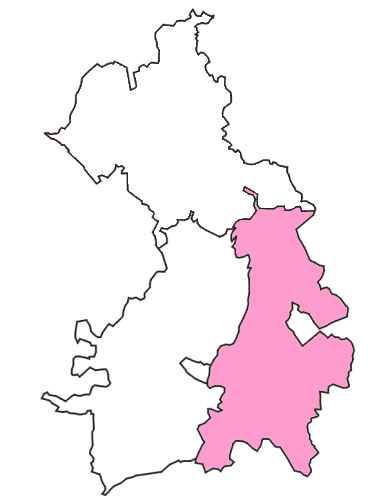
Newmarket in Cambridgeshire 1885-1918

The contents of the division were defined as:

- The Sessional Divisions of Bottisham, Linton and Newmarket; and
- The Parishes of Ely College, Ely Holy Trinity and Ely St. Mary.

Newmarket lay at the centre of the constituency, although only part of the town (All Saints Parish) was within the parliamentary county of Cambridgeshire and formed part of this seat. The Local Government Act 1888 made the entirety of Newmarket urban sanitary district part of the administrative county of West Suffolk. However this did not affect the parliamentary boundaries until 1918. The small city of Ely was the only other urban area.

The rural parishes in the constituency were: Ashley, Babraham, Balsham, Bottisham, Brinkley, Burrough Green, Burwell, Castle Camps, Carlton, Cherry Hinton, Cheveley, Chippenham, Duxford, Fen Ditton, Fordham, Fulbourn, Great Abington, Great Wilbraham, Hildersham, Hinxton, Horningsea, Horseheath, Ickleton, Isleham, Kennett, Kirtling, Landwade, Linton, Little Abington, Little Wilbraham, Shudy Camps, Pampisford, Sawston, Snailwell, Soham, Stetchworth, Stow cum Quy, Swaffham Bulbeck, Swaffham Prior, Teversham, West Wickham, West Wratting, Westley Waterless, Weston Colville, Whittlesford, Wicken, Wood Ditton.

== Members of Parliament ==
Year	Member	Party
1885	Sir George Newnes	Liberal
1895	Harry McCalmont	Conservative
1903	Charles Rose	Liberal
1910	George Henry Verrall	Conservative
1910	Sir Charles Rose	Liberal
1913	John Denison-Pender	Unionist
1918	constituency abolished	

== Election results ==
=== Elections in the 1880s ===
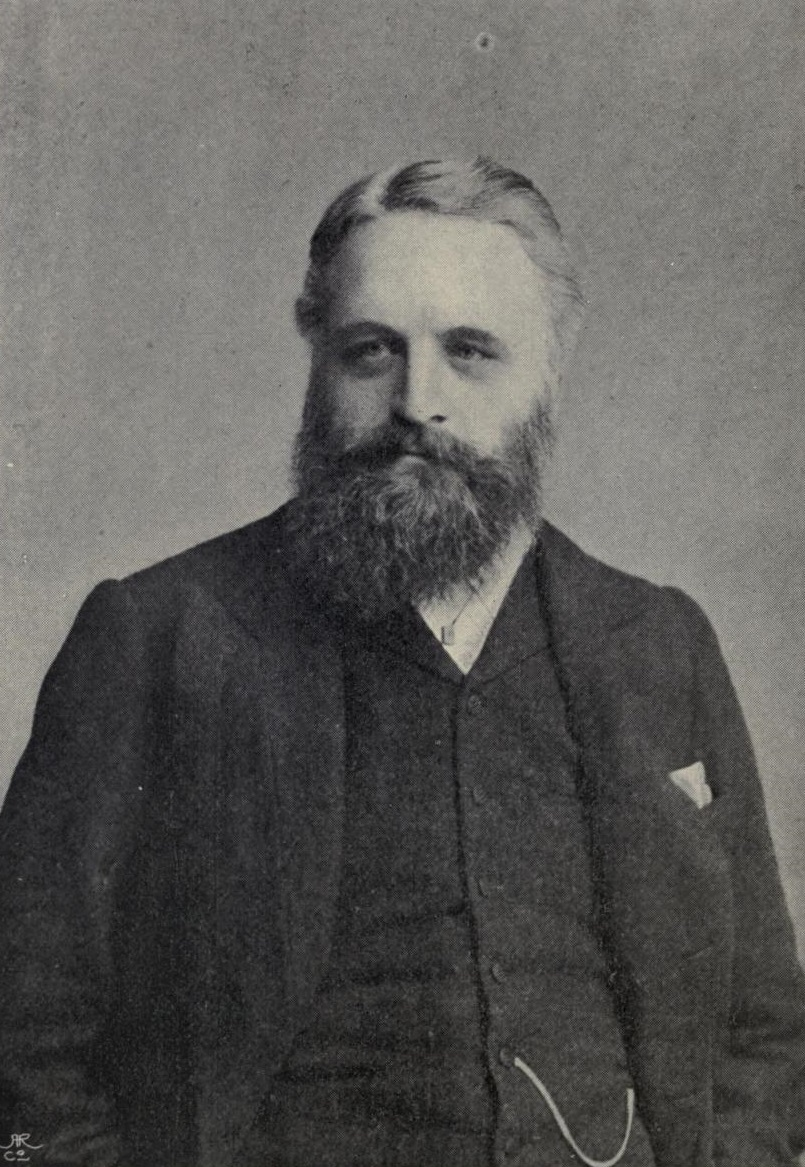
Newnes

General election 1885: Newmarket
Party	Candidate	Votes	%	±%
Liberal	George Newnes	3,931	57.0	
Conservative	Edward Hicks	2,960	43.0	
Majority		971	14.0	
Turnout		6,891	77.1	
Registered electors		8,936		
Liberal win (new seat)				

General election 1886: Newmarket
Party	Candidate	Votes	%	±%
Liberal	George Newnes	3,405	50.0	−7.0
Conservative	George Osborne	3,105	45.6	+2.6
Independent Liberal Unionist	William Henry Hall	298	4.4	New
Majority		300	4.4	−9.6
Turnout		6,808	76.2	−0.9
Registered electors		8,936		
Liberal hold		Swing	−4.8	

=== Elections in the 1890s ===
General election 1892: Newmarket
Party	Candidate	Votes	%	±%
Liberal	George Newnes	4,391	58.1	+8.1
Conservative	Henry Alexander Giffard	3,168	41.9	−3.7
Majority		1,223	16.2	+11.8
Turnout		7,559	80.5	+4.3
Registered electors		9,391		
Liberal hold		Swing	+5.9	

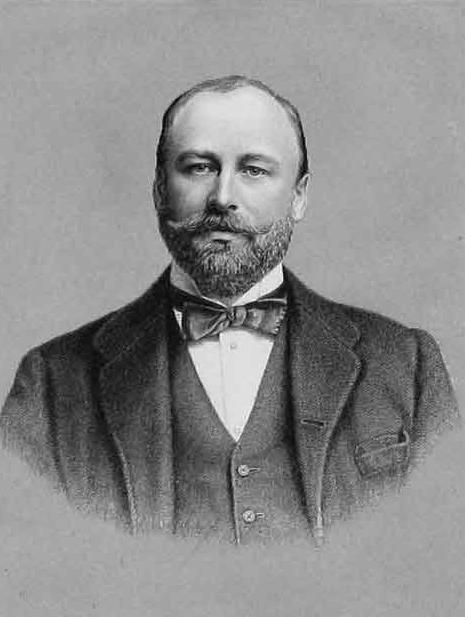
Harry McCalmont

General election 1895: Newmarket
Party	Candidate	Votes	%	±%
Conservative	Harry McCalmont	4,210	52.1	+10.2
Liberal	George Newnes	3,867	47.9	−10.2
Majority		343	4.2	N/A
Turnout		8,077	82.9	+2.4
Registered electors		9,738		
Conservative gain from Liberal		Swing	+10.2	

=== Elections in the 1900s ===
General election 1900: Newmarket
Party	Candidate	Votes	%	±%
Conservative	Harry McCalmont	4,295	57.2	+5.1
Liberal	Charles Rose	3,218	42.8	−5.1
Majority		1,077	14.4	+10.2
Turnout		7,513	79.3	−3.6
Registered electors		9,477		
Conservative hold		Swing	+5.1	

Charles Rose

1903 Newmarket by-election
Party	Candidate	Votes	%	±%
Liberal	Charles Rose	4,414	53.0	+10.2
Conservative	Henry Brassey	3,907	47.0	−10.2
Majority		507	6.0	N/A
Turnout		8,321	86.2	+6.9
Registered electors		9,650		
Liberal gain from Conservative		Swing	+10.2	

General election 1906: Newmarket
Party	Candidate	Votes	%	±%
Liberal	Charles Rose	4,666	54.6	+11.8
Conservative	George Verrall	3,883	45.4	−11.8
Majority		783	9.2	N/A
Turnout		8,549	86.1	+6.8
Registered electors		9,934		
Liberal gain from Conservative		Swing	+11.8	

=== Elections in the 1910s ===
General election January 1910: Newmarket
Party	Candidate	Votes	%	±%
Conservative	George Verrall	4,752	50.6	+5.2
Liberal	Charles Rose	4,632	49.4	−5.2
Majority		120	1.2	N/A
Turnout		9,384	90.5	+4.4
Conservative gain from Liberal		Swing	+5.2	

General election December 1910: Newmarket
Party	Candidate	Votes	%	±%
Liberal	Charles Rose	4,786	52.2	+2.8
Conservative	George Verrall	4,387	47.8	−2.8
Majority		399	4.4	N/A
Turnout		9,173	88.5	−2.0
Liberal gain from Conservative		Swing	+2.8	

1913 Newmarket by-election
Party	Candidate	Votes	%	±%
Unionist	John Denison-Pender	5,251	54.4	+6.6
Lib-Lab	George Nicholls	4,400	45.6	−6.6
Majority		851	8.8	N/A
Turnout		9,651	89.9	+1.4
Unionist gain from Liberal		Swing	+6.6	

== See also ==
- Parliamentary representation from Cambridgeshire
- List of former United Kingdom Parliament constituencies

== Sources ==
- Boundaries of Parliamentary Constituencies 1885-1972, compiled and edited by F.W.S. Craig (Parliamentary Reference Publications 1972)
- Social Geography of British Elections 1885-1910, by Henry Pelling (Macmillan 1967)
- Leigh Rayment's Historical List of MPs – Constituencies beginning with "N" (part 1)
