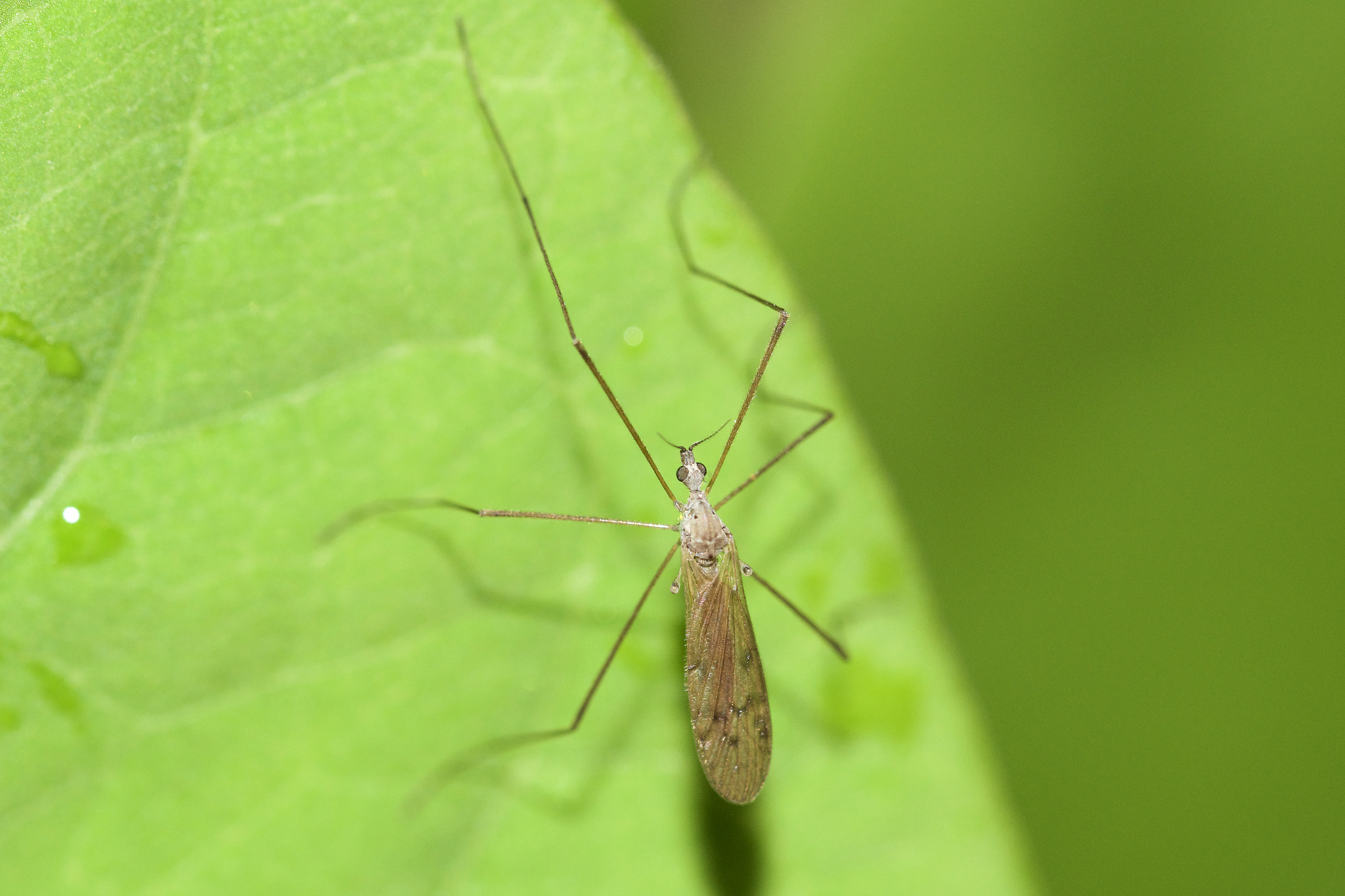
- Pseudolimnophila luteipennis

Scientific classification
- Kingdom: Animalia
- Phylum: Arthropoda
- Class: Insecta
- Order: Diptera
- Family: Limoniidae
- Subfamily: Limnophilinae
- Genus: Pseudolimnophila; Alexander, 1919

Type species
- Limnophila luteipennis Osten Sacken, 1860

Subgenera
- Calolimnophila Alexander, 1921; Pseudolimnophila Alexander, 1919

= Pseudolimnophila =

Genus of flies

Pseudolimnophila is a genus of crane flies in the family Limoniidae.

== Species ==
Subgenus Calolimnophila Alexander, 1921

- P. alboapicata Alexander, 1955
- P. comes Alexander, 1930
- P. imperita Alexander, 1949
- P. interstincta Alexander, 1956
- P. mauritiana Alexander, 1954
- P. niveicoxa Alexander, 1958
- P. octoseriata Alexander, 1951
- P. princeps Alexander, 1921
- P. rex Alexander, 1920
- P. sottiauxi Alexander, 1956
- P. subimperita Alexander, 1976
- P. subprinceps Alexander, 1972
- P. xanthomelania Alexander, 1960

Subgenus Pseudolimnophila Alexander, 1919

- P. apicinigra Alexander, 1936
- P. aurantiaca Alexander, 1920
- P. auranticollis Alexander, 1958
- P. auripes Alexander, 1931
- P. australina Alexander, 1927
- P. bisatrata Alexander, 1950
- P. brunneinota Alexander, 1933
- P. chikurina Alexander, 1930
- P. chrysopoda Alexander, 1949
- P. cinctifemur Alexander, 1920
- P. compta Alexander, 1930
- P. concussa Alexander, 1936
- P. contempta (Osten Sacken, 1869)
- P. costofimbriata Alexander, 1927
- P. descripta Alexander, 1928
- P. dravidica Alexander, 1974
- P. dundoensis Alexander, 1963
- P. ebullata Stary, 1982
- P. eremnonota Alexander, 1960
- P. ernestina Alexander, 1953
- P. exsul Alexander, 1950
- P. flavithorax Alexander, 1956
- P. frugi (Bergroth, 1888)
- P. fusca (Brunetti, 1918)
- P. glabra (Brunetti, 1918)
- P. honesta (Brunetti, 1912)
- P. illegitima Alexander, 1931
- P. inconcussa (Alexander, 1913)
- P. inornata (Osten Sacken, 1869)
- P. kambaitiae Alexander, 1954
- P. legitima Alexander, 1931
- P. lucorum (Meigen, 1818)
- P. luteipennis (Osten Sacken, 1860)
- P. luteitarsis Alexander, 1930
- P. megalops Alexander, 1942
- P. melanura Savchenko, 1984
- P. monomelania Alexander, 1963
- P. multipunctata (Brunetti, 1912)
- P. noveboracensis (Alexander, 1911)
- P. nycteris Alexander, 1937
- P. pallidicoxa (Brunetti, 1912)
- P. palmeri (Alexander, 1915)
- P. pluto Alexander, 1939
- P. plutoides Alexander, 1948
- P. polytila Alexander, 1955
- P. productivena Alexander, 1951
- P. projecta Alexander, 1937
- P. rhanteria Alexander, 1927
- P. rhodesiae (Alexander, 1921)
- P. senex Alexander, 1920
- P. seniorwhitei Alexander, 1927
- P. sepium (Verrall, 1886)
- P. seticostata Alexander, 1936
- P. spatiosa Alexander, 1965
- P. subaurantiaca Alexander, 1956
- P. subhonesta Alexander, 1974
- P. supplementa Alexander, 1945
- P. telephallus Alexander, 1957
- P. varipes Alexander, 1920
- P. xantha Alexander, 1955
- P. zelanica Alexander, 1958
