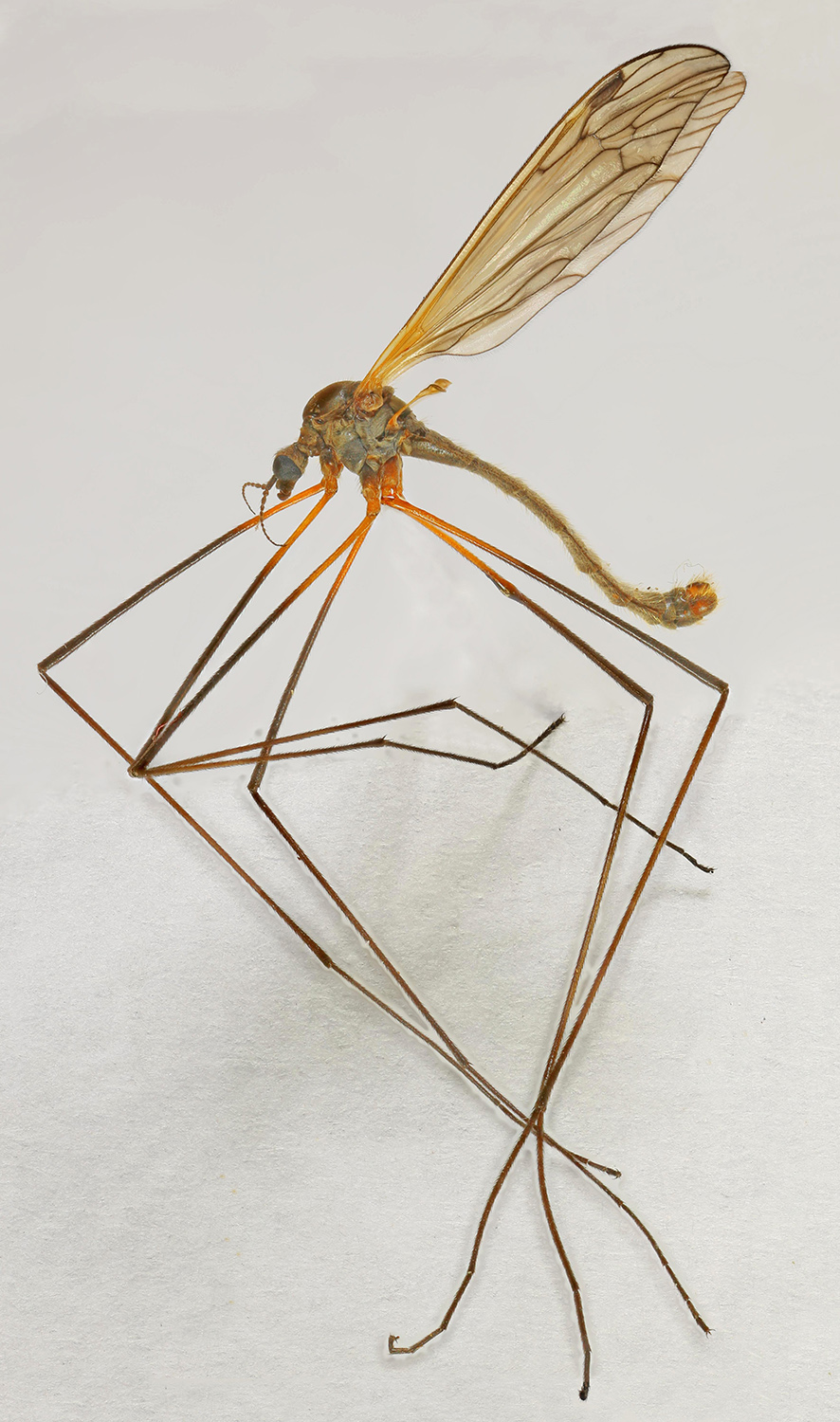
- Euphylidorea meigenii

Scientific classification
- Kingdom: Animalia
- Phylum: Arthropoda
- Class: Insecta
- Order: Diptera
- Family: Limoniidae
- Subfamily: Limnophilinae
- Genus: Euphylidorea; Alexander, 1972

Type species
- Limnophila niveitarsis Osten Sacken, 1869

Species
- See text

= Euphylidorea =

Genus of flies

Euphylidorea is a genus of crane fly in the family Limoniidae.

== Species ==
- E. adusta (Osten Sacken, 1860)
- E. adustoides (Alexander, 1927)
- E. aequiatra (Alexander, 1949)
- E. albipes (Leonard, 1913)
- E. aleutica (Alexander, 1920)
- E. aperta (Verrall, 1887)
- E. auripennis (Alexander, 1926)
- E. brevifilosa (Alexander, 1959)
- E. burdicki (Alexander, 1964)
- E. caudifera (Alexander, 1927)
- E. cherokeensis (Alexander, 1940)
- E. columbiana (Alexander, 1927)
- E. consimilis (Dietz, 1921)
- E. costata (Coquillett, 1901)
- E. crocotula (Séguy, 1941)
- E. dispar (Meigen, 1818)
- E. epimicta (Alexander, 1927)
- E. flavapila (Doane, 1900)
- E. fratria (Osten Sacken, 1869)
- E. frosti (Alexander, 1961)
- E. fumidicosta (Alexander, 1927)
- E. fuscovenosa (Alexander, 1927)
- E. globulifera (Alexander, 1941)
- E. insularis (Johnson, 1913)
- E. iowensis (Alexander, 1927)
- E. lineola (Meigen, 1804)
- E. lutea (Doane, 1900)
- E. luteola (Alexander, 1927)
- E. meigenii (Verrall, 1886)
- E. microphallus (Alexander, 1927)
- E. neadusta (Alexander, 1927)
- E. nevadensis (Alexander, 1958)
- E. nigrogeniculata (Alexander, 1926)
- E. niveitarsis (Osten Sacken, 1869)
- E. novaeangliae (Alexander, 1914)
- E. olympica (Alexander, 1949)
- E. osceola (Alexander, 1927)
- E. pacalis (Alexander, 1949)
- E. paeneadusta (Alexander, 1961)
- E. persimilis (Alexander, 1927)
- E. phaeostigma (Schummel, 1829)
- E. platyphallus (Alexander, 1926)
- E. semifacta (Alexander, 1948)
- E. similis (Alexander, 1911)
- E. siouana (Alexander, 1929)
- E. snoqualmiensis (Alexander, 1945)
- E. stupkai (Alexander, 1940)
- E. subadusta (Alexander, 1924)
- E. subsimilis (Alexander, 1927)
- E. tepida (Alexander, 1926)
- E. terraenovae (Alexander, 1916)
