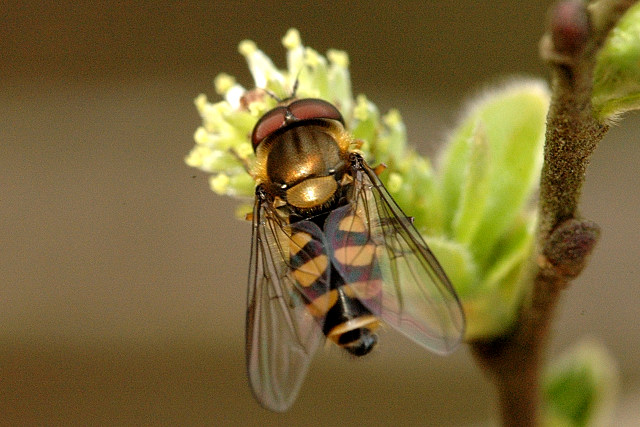
- male
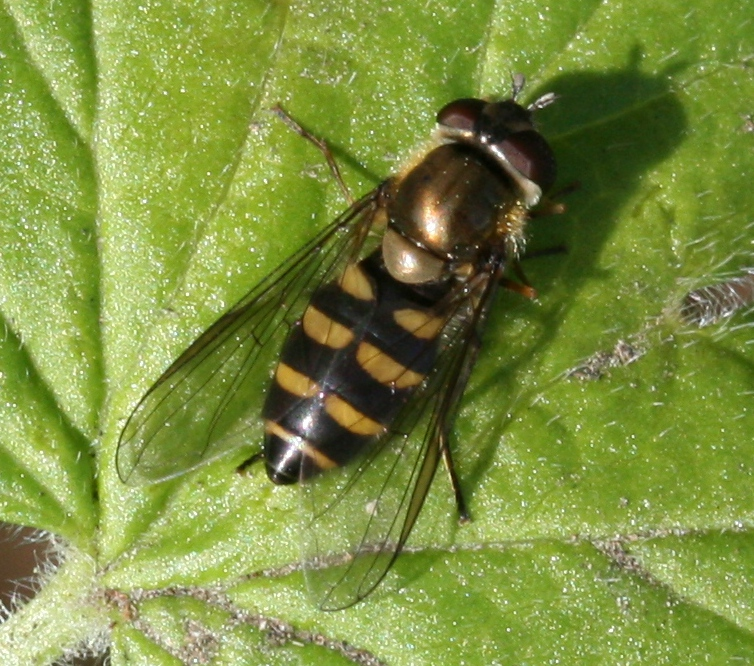
- female

Scientific classification
- Kingdom: Animalia
- Phylum: Arthropoda
- Class: Insecta
- Order: Diptera
- Family: Syrphidae
- Genus: Parasyrphus
- Species: P. punctulatus

Binomial name
- Parasyrphus punctulatus (Verrall, 1873)

Synonyms
- Syrphus punctulatus Verrall, 1873

= Parasyrphus punctulatus =

Species of fly

Parasyrphus punctulatus is a Palearctic species of hoverfly.

== Distribution ==
It is found from Fennoscandia, south to the Pyrenees; from Ireland, east through Northern Europe and Central Europe, and south to Northern Italy; though European Russia and the Caucasus, on through Siberia and the Russian Far East to the Pacific coast and Japan, as well as the Himalayas and Nepal.

== Biology ==
Habitat: Quercus, Fraxinus woodland and Betula, Salix, Alnus woodland suburban gardens and orchards with mature trees. Flowers visited include white umbellifers, Acer pseudoplatanus, Aliaria, Anemone nemorosa, Caltha, Cardamine, Crataegus, Euphorbia, Ilex, Ligustrum, Meum, Oxalis, Prunus cerasus, Prunus laurocerasus, Prunus spinosa, Ranunculus, Salix, Sambucus racemosa, Sorbus aucuparia, Taraxacum, Tussilago, Ulex, Viburnum opulus. Flies mid April to mid June (later at higher altitudes).

== Additional information ==
External images For terms see Morphology of Diptera
See references for determination.
