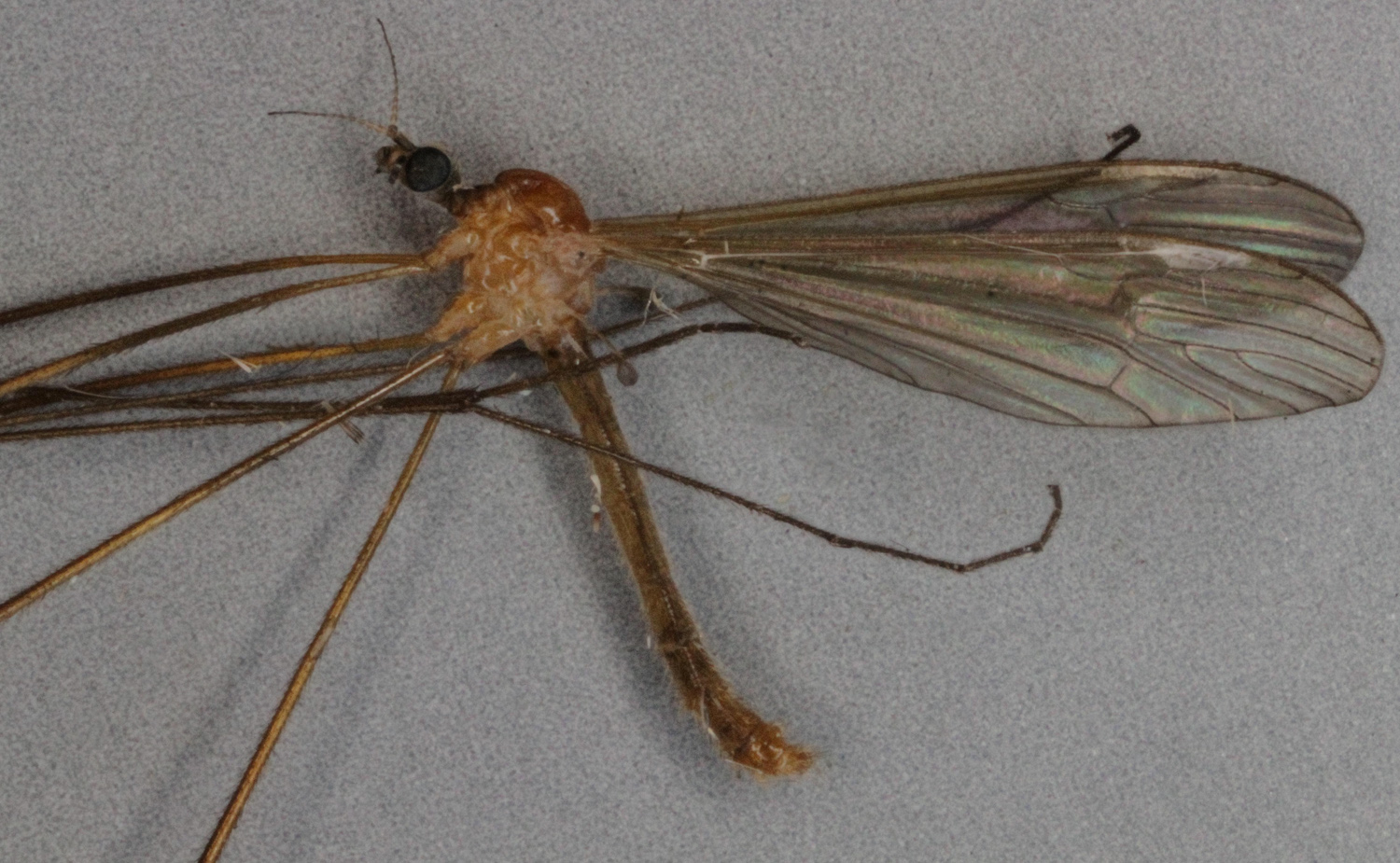
- Euphylidorea aperta, North Wales

Scientific classification
- Kingdom: Animalia
- Phylum: Arthropoda
- Class: Insecta
- Order: Diptera
- Infraorder: Tipulomorpha
- Superfamily: Tipuloidea
- Family: Limoniidae
- Subfamily: Limnophilinae
- Genus: Euphylidorea
- Species: E. aperta

Binomial name
- Euphylidorea aperta (Verrall, 1887)

= Euphylidorea aperta =

Species of fly

Euphylidorea aperta is a Palearctic species of cranefly in the family Limoniidae. It is found in a wide range of habitats and micro habitats: in earth rich with humus, in swamps and marshes, in leaf litter, and in wet spots within the woods.
