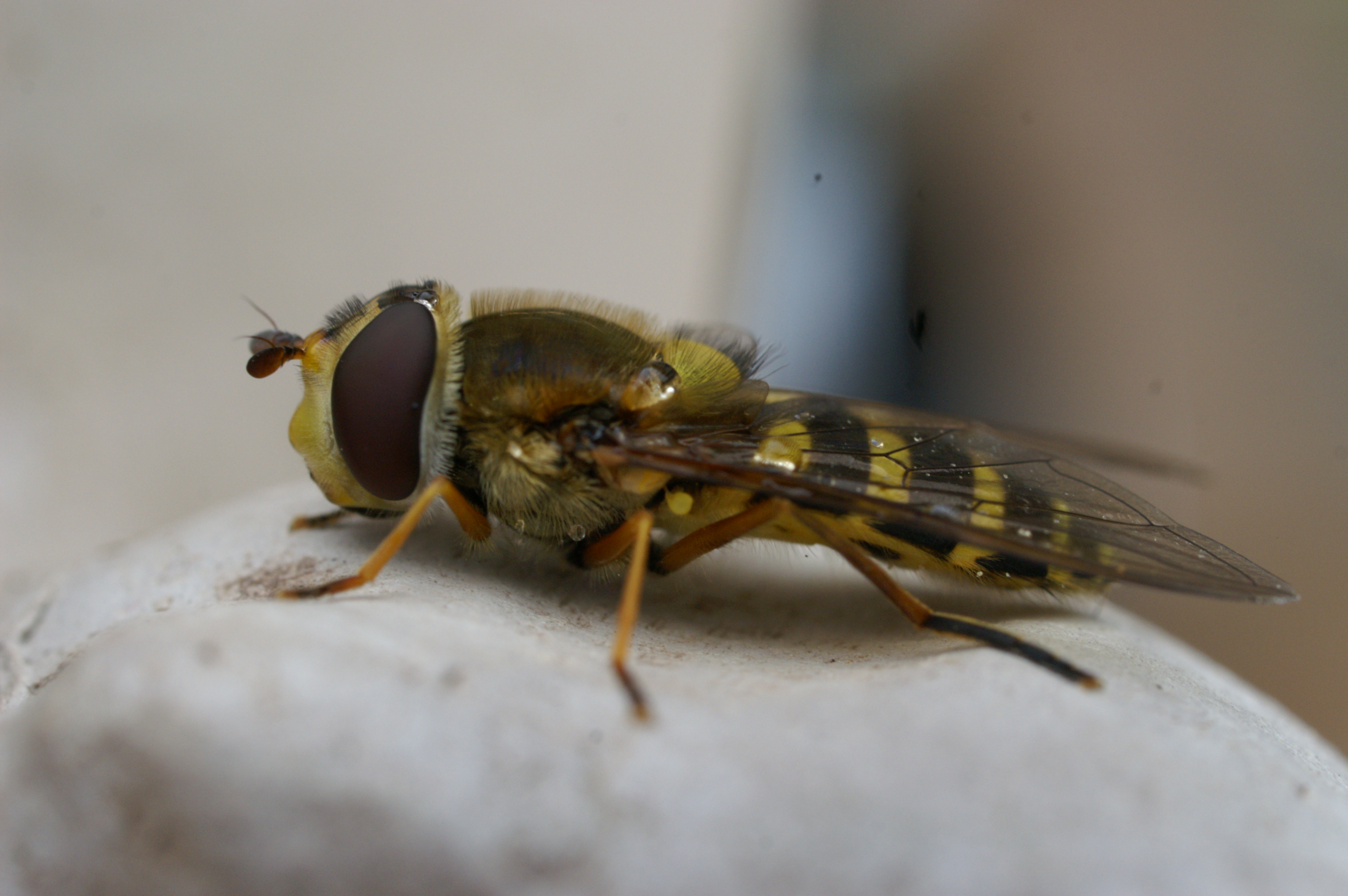
- Parasyrphus annulatus female

Scientific classification
- Kingdom: Animalia
- Phylum: Arthropoda
- Class: Insecta
- Order: Diptera
- Family: Syrphidae
- Tribe: Syrphini
- Genus: Parasyrphus; Matsumura, 1917
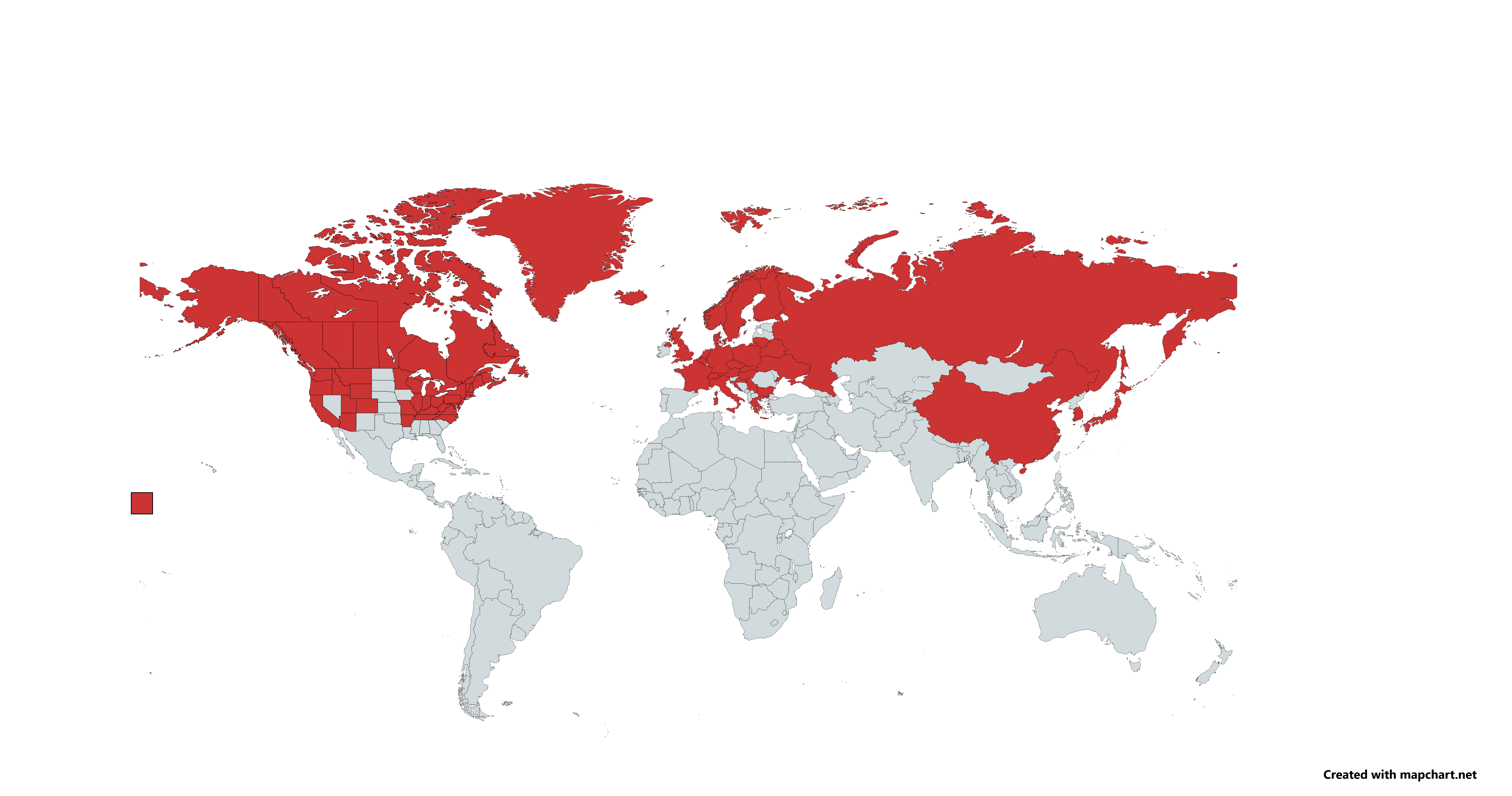
- Parasyrphus range map

Synonyms
- Phalacrodira Enderlein, 1938

= Parasyrphus =

Genus of flies

Parasyrphus is a genus of hover fly found in the holarctic area of the world including species like Parasyrphus tarsatus located in some very northern areas. Very few of the 31 identified species have known larvae. Of the known larvae most are predators of tree aphids with two, Parasyrphus nigritarsis and Parasyrphus melanderi, that feed on beetle eggs and larvae.

== Description ==
For terminology see Thompson glossary of taxonomic terms
Species of this genus are small to medium sized 5.6–11 mm (0.22–0.43 in), sturdy, usually with posteriorly rounded yellow spots or straight or posteriorly emarginate yellow bands on the oval abdomen, rarely with yellow abdominal markings reduced or absent. The abdomen is not marginate. The anterior anepisternum with short to moderately long erect hairs, at least posterodorsally. The hind coxa have tufts of hairs at the posteromedial apical angle. The eyes may be either bare or haired. The face usually has a prominent tubercle. It is usually yellow or with distinct black median stripe though in some cases may be entirely dark brown to black.
The scutum is subshining black. The scutellum is dull yellow normally darker on the sides. The pleura are black, weakly. The anterior part of the anepisternum has many long erect hairs. The upper and lower katepisternal hair patches are either separated or narrowly joined posteriorly. The meron, metapleuron, and metasternum are bare. Wings entirely trichose or with small basal bare areas. The hind coxa have apical tufts of several strong hairs on the rear central area. The abdomen is oval unmargined, except with very weakly in Parasyrphus nigritarsis.
Abdominal segment 2 usually with pair of spots; Segments 3 and 4 usually each with pair of yellow spots or an entire or deeply emarginate yellow band posteriorly. The yellow spots or bands in some specimens can be reduced or even absent. Segment 4 and often segment 5 have the posterior margin narrowly yellow. The sternites are yellow, usually with faint or distinct dark median spots, stripes, or broad triangles or with black subapical bands. A key to European genera of the family Syrphidaae is provided here Speight key to genera and glossary

== Species ==
- P. aeneostoma (Matsumura 1917)
- P. altimontanus (Barkalov, 2005)
- P. ammosovi (Bagatshanova, 1990)
- P. annulatus (Zetterstedt, 1838)
- P. currani (Fluke, 1935)
- P. genualis (Williston, 1887)
- P. groenlandicus (Nielsen, 1910)
- P. insolitus (Osburn, 1908)
- P. iraidae (Mutin, 1987)
- P. kashmiricus (Ghorpade, 1994)
- P. kirgizorum (Peck, 1969)
- P. levinae (Violovich, 1975)
- P. lineolus (Zetterstedt, 1843)
- P. macularis (Zetterstedt, 1843)
- P. magadanensis (Mutin, 1991)
- P. makarkini (Mutin, 1990)
- P. malinellus (Collin, 1952)
- P. melanderi (Curran, 1925)
- P. minimus (Shiraki, 1930)
- P. montanus (Peck, 1972)
- P. nigritarsis (Zetterstedt, 1843)
- P. proximus (Mutin, 1990)
- P. punctulatus (Verrall, 1873)
- P. relictus (Zetterstedt, 1838)
- P. sapporensis (Matsumura, 1918)
- P. sherpa (Ghorpade, 1994)
- P. semiinterruptus (Fluke, 1935)
- P. tarsatus (Zetterstedt, 1838)
- P. thompsoni (Ghorpade, 1994)
- P. vittiger (Zetterstedt, 1843)
- P. vockerothi (Thompson, 2012)
- P. zhengi (Yuan, Huo & Ren, 2011)

== Identification of species ==
Keys and descriptions for some of the regions, where distributed.

- "Hoverflies of Northwest Europe"
- Handbook of British Insects,
- Diagnostic keys to species of Indian subcontinent
- Key to Northwest Europe and Russia
- Northeastern North America
