= Cheveley Castle =

Castle in Cambridgeshire, England

- Cheveley, Cambridgeshire, England

Site information
- Type: Fortified manor house in an Edwardian style
- Condition: Only limited masonry survives

Location
- Shown within Cambridgeshire
- Location within Cambridgeshire
- Coordinates: 52.22441°N 0.45630°E

Site history
- Materials: Stone

Cheveley Castle was a medieval fortified manor house near Cheveley, Cambridgeshire, England.

== Details ==
Cheveley Castle was built by Sir John Pulteney, a merchant-financier and Lord Mayor of London, around 1341 on the outskirts of the village of Cheveley. The castle was built in an Edwardian style, with four circular towers, gatehouse and a bailey wall, on an elaborate moated site north-west of the village. It is the only castle of its type to have been built in Cambridgeshire, and was probably intended less for defence than as a high-status hunting lodge – in the 14th century, Cheveley was at the centre of a deer park. The moat at Cheveley may have inspired other, similar moated designs across the eastern region.

The castle deteriorated after the early 17th-century, and today only limited masonry remains exist on the site, which is a scheduled monument. Cheveley Park was constructed a few hundred metres to the west of the site of the castle.

== See also ==
- Castles in Great Britain and Ireland
- List of castles in England

== Bibliography ==
- Creighton, Oliver Hamilton. (2005) Castles and Landscapes: Power, Community and Fortification in Medieval England. London: Equinox. ISBN 978-1-904768-67-8.
