= Parasyrphus malinellus =

Scientific classification
- Kingdom: Animalia
- Phylum: Arthropoda
- Class: Insecta
- Order: Diptera
- Family: Syrphidae
- Genus: Parasyrphus
- Species: P. malinellus

Binomial name
- Parasyrphus malinellus (Collin, 1952)

Synonyms
- Syrphus malinellus Collin, 1952

Species of fly

Parasyrphus malinellus is a species of hoverfly, from the family Syrphidae, in the order Diptera.

== Description ==
External images For terms see Morphology of Diptera
Wing length 7·75-8·75 mm. Triangular dark spots on sternites 3 and 4. Males have a yellow face with a black stripe and the mouth edge is black. The male genitalia are figured by Hippa (1968). See references for determination.

== Distribution ==
Palearctic Fennoscandia South to the Ardennes and the Alps. Ireland East through North Europe and Central Europe into European Russia then to Siberia to the Russian Far East.

== Biology ==
Habitat: Abies, Picea, Pinus forest. Flowers visited include white umbellifers, Anemone nemorosa, Barbarea, Cardamine flexuosa, Crataegus, Meum, Prunus cerasus, Prunus spinosa, Petasites albus, Ranunculus, Rubus fruticosus, Salix, Sorbus aucuparia, Stellaria, Taraxacum, Vaccinium myrtillus. The flight period is April to July. The larva is aphid feeding.
