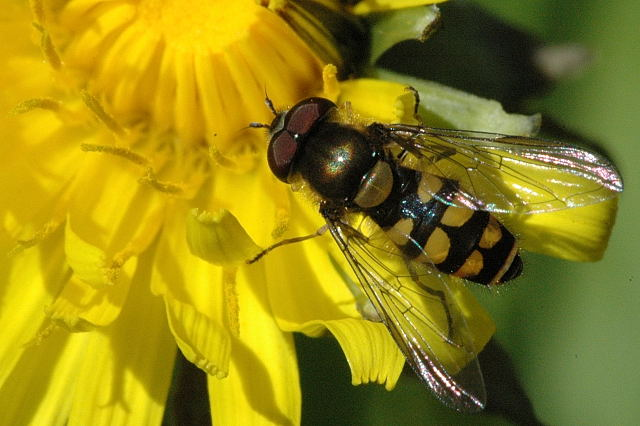
- Parasyrphus macularis male

Scientific classification
- Kingdom: Animalia
- Phylum: Arthropoda
- Class: Insecta
- Order: Diptera
- Family: Syrphidae
- Genus: Parasyrphus
- Species: P. macularis

Binomial name
- Parasyrphus macularis (Zetterstedt, 1843)

= Parasyrphus macularis =

Species of fly

Parasyrphus macularis is a European species of hoverfly.
