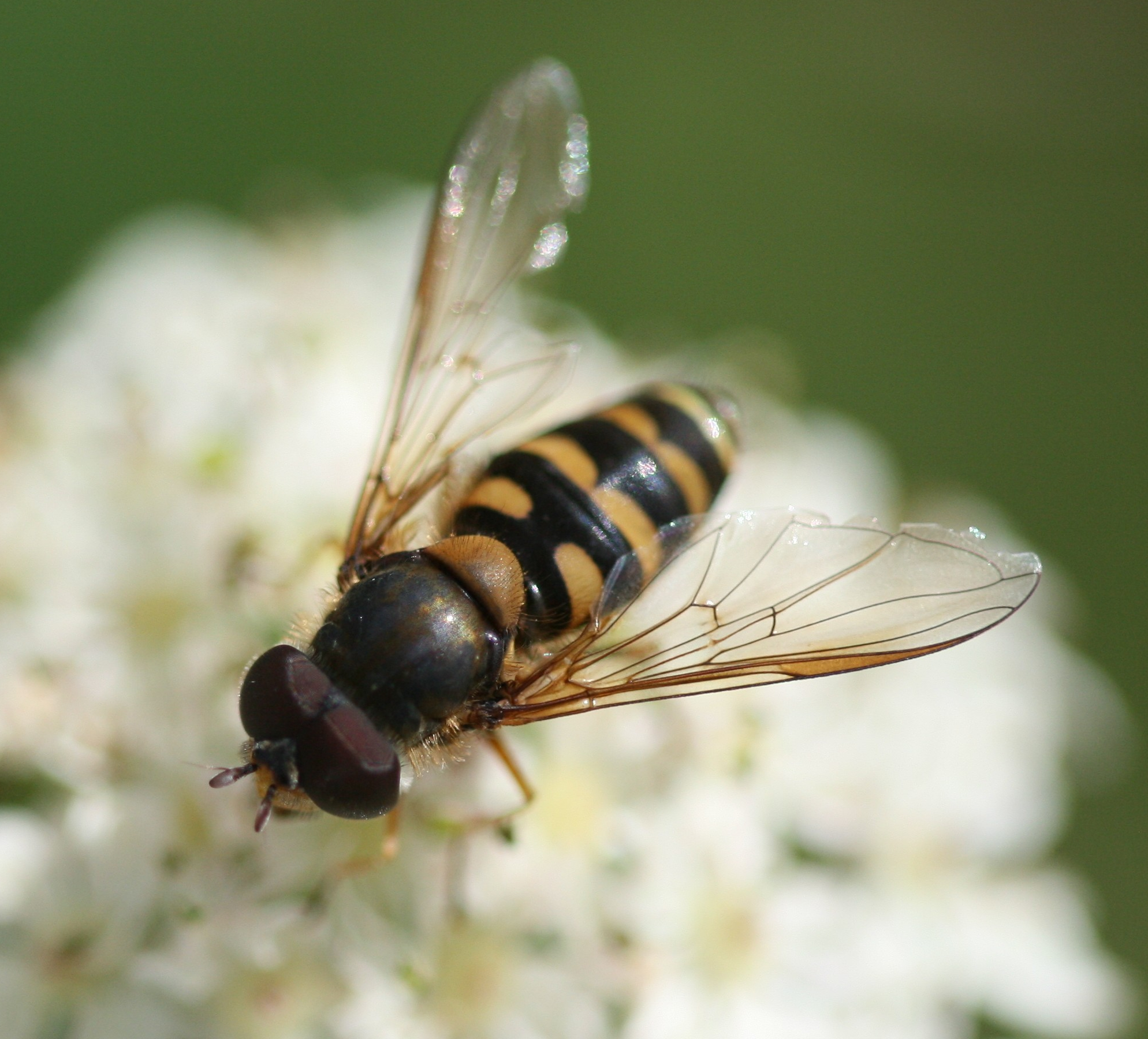
- Parasyrphus vittiger (male)

Scientific classification
- Kingdom: Animalia
- Phylum: Arthropoda
- Class: Insecta
- Order: Diptera
- Family: Syrphidae
- Genus: Parasyrphus
- Species: P. vittiger

Binomial name
- Parasyrphus vittiger (Zetterstedt, 1843)

Synonyms
- Scaeva vittiger Zetterstedt, 1843

= Parasyrphus vittiger =

Species of fly

Parasyrphus vittiger is a species of hoverfly, from the family Syrphidae, in the order Diptera.

== Description ==
External images For terms see Morphology of Diptera
Wing length 6·25- 8·75 mm. Hind tibia yellow at base and apex. Pterostigma grey. Fore tarsus with segments 4 and 5 darkened (other segments yellow). The male terminalia are figured by Hippa (1968). Larva described and figured by Rotheray (1994). See references for determination.

== Distribution ==
Palearctic Fennoscandia South to the Pyrenees and central Spain. Ireland East through Europe and European Russia. Caucasus and from the Urals to central Siberia (Cis-Baikal, Yakutia).

== Biology ==
Habitat: Abies, Picea, Pinus forest and Fagus woodland. Flowers visited include Alchemilla, Galium, Potentilla erecta, Ranunculus, Salix,, Taraxacum see list in Speight (refs) for more. Flies April to September. The larva is predatory on aphids.
