= Cheveley Park =

Former stately home and estate in Cambridgeshire, England

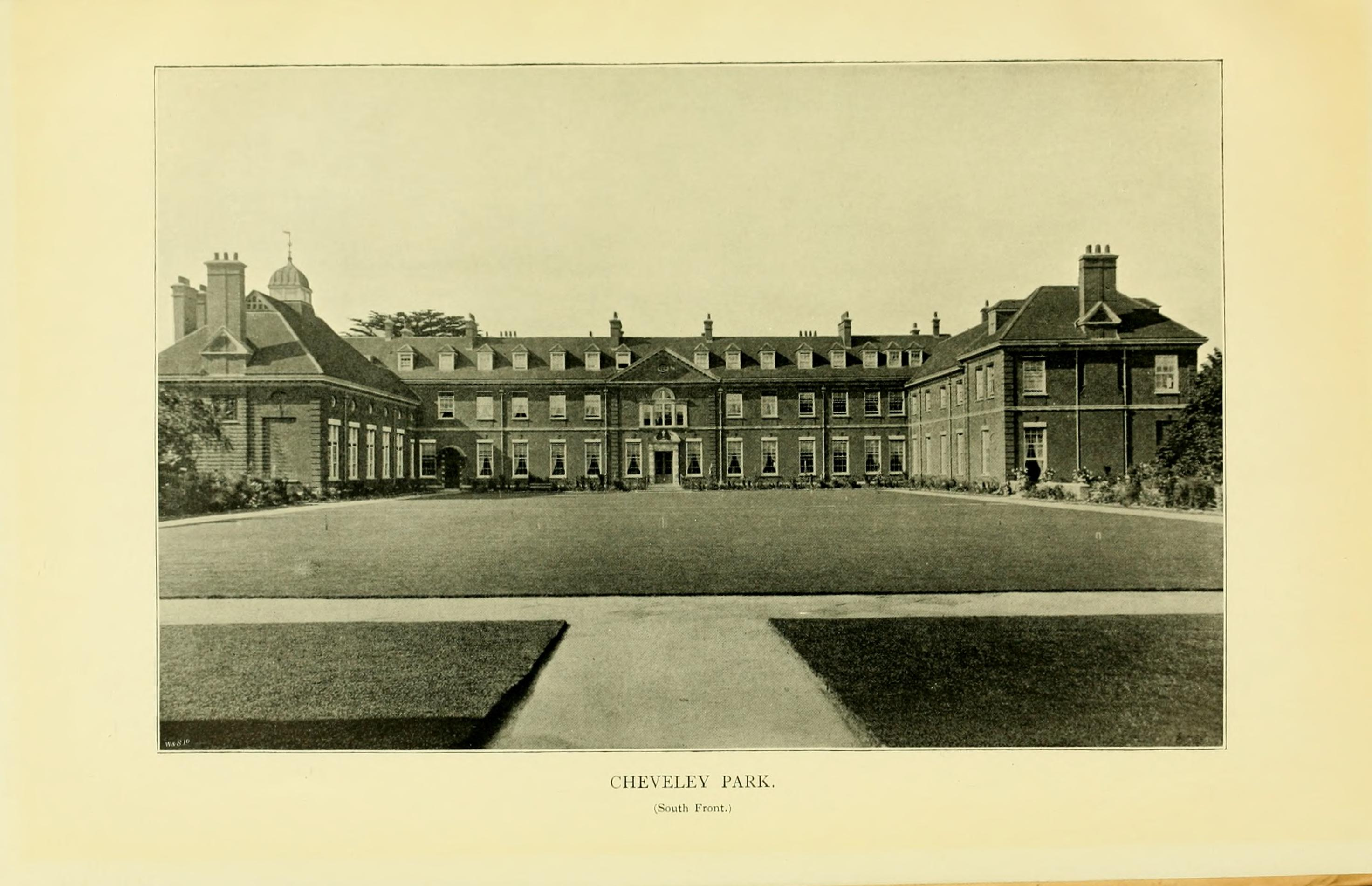
- Cheveley Park in circa 1899
- Interactive map of the Cheveley Park area

General information
- Architectural style: Baroque architecture (1670s Jermyn house); Neo-classical architecture (1890s Victorian house)
- Location: England, Cheveley, Cambridgeshire
- Coordinates: 52°13′20″N 0°26′43″E
- Demolished: 1920

Cheveley Park was an English stately home and estate in Cheveley, Cambridgeshire. The house's proximity to Newmarket Racecourse made it an important social venue for the royal court during the reigns of the Stuart kings, especially under the ownership of Henry Jermyn, 1st Earl of St Albans and his nephew, Henry Jermyn, 1st Baron Dover. Cheveley Park later became a significant holding in the estates of the Dukes of Somerset and the Dukes of Rutland. The house, which was rebuilt in the 1670s by Lord St Albans and in the 1890s by Harry Leslie Blundell McCalmont, was demolished in 1920. A stud farm has existed on the estate since at least the 17th century, and Cheveley Park Stud now occupies part of the former estate.

== History ==
=== Cotton and Carleton ownership ===
The Cotton family owned the land surrounding the fortified manor at Cheveley Castle from the 15th century. A separate mansion, a few hundred metres to the west of the castle, called Cheveley Hall, was either built or expanded by Sir John Cotton in around 1603. In February 1625, the hall and estate were acquired by Sir John Carleton, 1st Baronet through his marriage to Sir John Cotton's widow, Lady Anne Cotton. In 1630, Charles I visited Sir John Carleton at Cheveley for the first time while the court was in Newmarket, and Carleton received several royal warrants to maintain the king's game in the vicinity of Newmarket. The estate was subsequently purchased by Sir Thomas Jermyn in 1637 following the death of Carleton; the widowed Lady Carleton continued to reside in house by mutual agreement until her death in 1671.

=== Jermyn ownership ===
A detail of a painting (c.1671, oil on canvas) by Jan Siberechts (1627–1703) of Cheveley Park when in the ownership of the Jermyns.

Following the death of Thomas Jermyn in 1645, the Cheveley estate was inherited his younger son, Henry Jermyn, the future of Earl of St Albans. The 1662 hearth tax recorded the hall as having twenty-one fire hearths. From 1665, royal attendance at Newmarket Racecourse became more frequent, and Cheveley became an important location in the court's social circuit. Lord St Albans took up residence at Cheveley in 1671 around the time of his appointment as Lord Chamberlain. As such, Cheveley was "frequently besieged by courtiers and others soliciting his patronage" and multiple royal warrants were issued from Cheveley by St Albans. During the 1670s, St Albans undertook major reconstruction work, replacing the old hall with a grand baroque mansion which resembled the nearby Horseheath Hall. The new Cheveley Park was a brick, seven-bay mansion with short projecting wings of two bays containing closets, formal garden enclosures, and a surrounding parkland. The main rooms occupied a double-pile east wing, of two storeys with attics and basements. The great hall in the north wing was incorporated from the Cottons’ original hall.

After St Albans' death in 1684, the estate passed to his favourite nephew, Henry Jermyn, 1st Baron Dover, who had already taken up residence during the 1670s. Jan Siberechts was commissioned by Lord Dover to decorate much of the interior. The principal rooms of the house were filled with fine paintings, including one by Rubens, and portraits of members of the Stuart royal family. He also had a Roman Catholic chapel constructed at the house. A painting of Cheveley by Siberechts from this period is today in the collection of Belvoir Castle. In the reign of James II, Cheveley Park became the site of “magnificent festivities”, with Lord Dover entertaining courtiers throughout the Newmarket racing season. During the Glorious Revolution, in early December 1688 Cheveley Park was attacked by a Protestant mob hostile to Lord Dover, who tore down the Catholic chapel. They were only prevented from attacking the main house after being paid off by Lady Dover. In September 1689, an inspection was ordered by William III's government to investigate and possibly seize Lord Dover’s estate and effects at Cheveley, but by November 1691 Dover was reconciled to the king and he lived out the rest of his life at Cheveley Park.

After Lord Dover’s death in 1708, Cheveley was left to his widow, Lady Dover, for the remainder of her life. On her death in 1726, the estate passed to Dover's great-nephew, Sir Jermyn Davers, 4th Baronet, who sold it in 1732 to Charles Seymour, 6th Duke of Somerset.

=== Ownership by the dukes of Somerset and Rutland ===
The Duke of Somerset greatly increased the estate by buying other land around Newmarket. He also altered the main house, dividing the great hall into a kitchen and pantry and removing the closet wings from the east front. He later extended the front laterally with pavilions at each end. Through the marriage of his daughter, Lady Frances Seymour, to John Manners, Marquess of Granby in 1750, the estate passed by descent to Charles Manners, 4th Duke of Rutland in 1779. Successive owners in the Manners family included the 5th, 6th and 7th dukes of Rutland. The east and west wings were demolished in 1857–8 when the north range was enlarged and refurbished by the architect William Burn.

=== McCalmont ownership and demolition ===
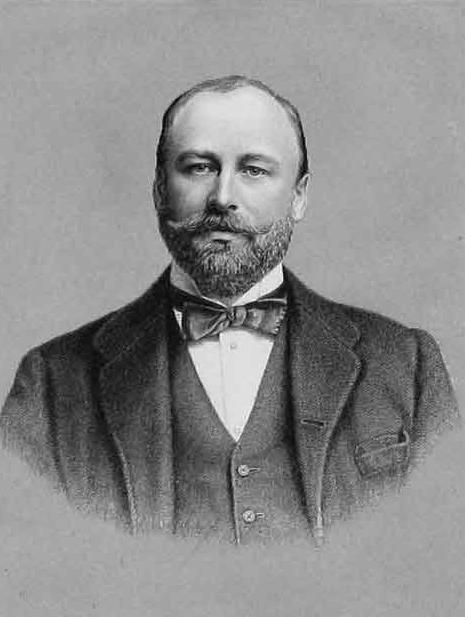
Colonel Harry McCalmont rebuilt the house in the neo-classical style in the 1890s

John Manners, 7th Duke of Rutland leased the estate in 1890 and sold it in 1893 to Harry Leslie Blundell McCalmont, the heir to a banking fortune. In 1896, McCalmont demolished the 17th century house built by the Jermyns and commissioned Robert William Edis to design a large and lavishly appointed neo-Classical mansion, also called Cheveley Park. This new house had 43 bedrooms and a long banqueting hall with a minstrels' gallery. McCalmont's widow disclaimed her life interest in 1919, and in 1920 the estate’s trustees and heir sold the estate to the Jockey Club. After this sale, the park was divided into stud farms and building lots, while the house was stripped of its contents and demolished. The manorial rights were acquired by a firm of Cambridge solicitors, while the site of the house became overgrown by woodland.

Cheveley Park Stud now occupies part of the former estate. The Cheveley Park Stakes were named after the estate.
