= Parasyrphus semiinterruptus =

Scientific classification
- Kingdom: Animalia
- Phylum: Arthropoda
- Class: Insecta
- Order: Diptera
- Family: Syrphidae
- Tribe: Syrphini
- Genus: Parasyrphus
- Species: P. semiinterruptus

Binomial name
- Parasyrphus semiinterruptus (Fluke, 1935)

Synonyms
- Epistrophe semiinterruptus Fluke, 1935

Species of fly

Parasyrphus semiinterruptus is a species of syrphid fly in the family Syrphidae.
