= 1913 Newmarket by-election =

UK parliamentary by-election

The 1913 Newmarket by-election was a parliamentary by-election held on 16 May 1913 to fill a vacancy in the United Kingdom House of Commons for the Eastern or Newmarket Division of Cambridgeshire.

== Vacancy ==
The vacancy occurred with the sudden death of the sitting Liberal Member of Parliament, Sir Charles Rose on 20 April 1913. Rose had been MP for Newmarket since 1903, except for a short period in 1910 when the Conservative G H Verrall held the seat. At the previous election, in December 1910, he had been returned with a majority of 399 votes.

Rose

General election 1910 (December)
Party	Candidate	Votes	%	±%
Liberal	Charles Rose	4,786	52.2	+2.8
Conservative	George Henry Verrall	4,387	47.8	−2.8
Majority		399	4.4	N/A
Turnout		9,173	88.5	−2.0
Liberal gain from Conservative		Swing	+2.8	

== Candidates and campaign ==
Within two days of Rose's death, the Conservatives had selected their candidate for the contest, J. C. Denison-Pender. Denison-Pender was a member of the ruling Conservative-backed Municipal Reform Party on the LCC. He had connections with the Newmarket area through his 1906 marriage to Irene, only child of Ernest de la Rue of Lower Hare Park.

There was speculation that Ernest Tanner, a member of the Saffron Walden borough council and Essex County Council would run for the Liberals, but he declined. On 1 May the High Sheriff of Cambridgeshire received the writ for the by-election, and Denison-Pender began to campaign. He opposed many of the main policies of the Liberal Government, including Irish Home Rule, the Welsh Church Bill and the effects of the National Insurance Act 1911.

The Liberals eventually chose George Nicholls, who had been MP for North Northamptonshire from 1906–1910, as their candidate. Nicholls was a former agricultural labourer from the neighbouring Wisbech area. He set out a programme to improve the lot of those working on the land, by removing the burden of taxation for education and roads from them. In the meantime the county's publicans organised as a Licensed Trade Defence Association to support the Conservative candidate.

== Polling ==
The election took place on Friday 16 May. The day was described as "glorious summer weather", and polling was very slow until the evening as work carried on in the fields. It was thought that many labourers had not been able to reach the polling stations, and that this would affect the Liberal vote. Party colours were worn by the supporters of the two candidates. From this The Times was able to report that the blue of the Liberals was dominant in the Cambridge suburb of Cherry Hinton and in the southern and western parts of the constituency. Unionist pink and white was prevalent in the City of Ely and the north of the division. There was a perceived shift in sympathies from the Liberals to the Conservatives in Fordham and Soham.

== Results ==
The results of the election were announced on Saturday 17 May at Cambridge Shire Hall. Denison-Pender won the seat for the Unionists by a larger than expected margin of 851 votes.

Nicholls

Newmarket by-election, 1913
Party	Candidate	Votes	%	±%
Unionist	John Denison-Pender	5,251	54.4	+6.6
Liberal	George Nicholls	4,400	45.6	−6.6
Majority		851	8.8	N/A
Turnout		9,651	89.9	+1.4
Unionist gain from Liberal		Swing	+6.6	

Denison-Pender attributed his success to the unpopularity of National Insurance. Nicholls agreed with this assessment, but also believed that his Non-Conformist religious views had lost him the powerful Anglican vote in the City of Ely, and that working men in the Newmarket area dependent on horse-racing for a living had opposed him.

Denison-Pender was to be the last member of parliament for the division, as it was abolished at the next redistribution of seats in 1918.

== See also ==
- List of United Kingdom by-elections (1900–1918)
