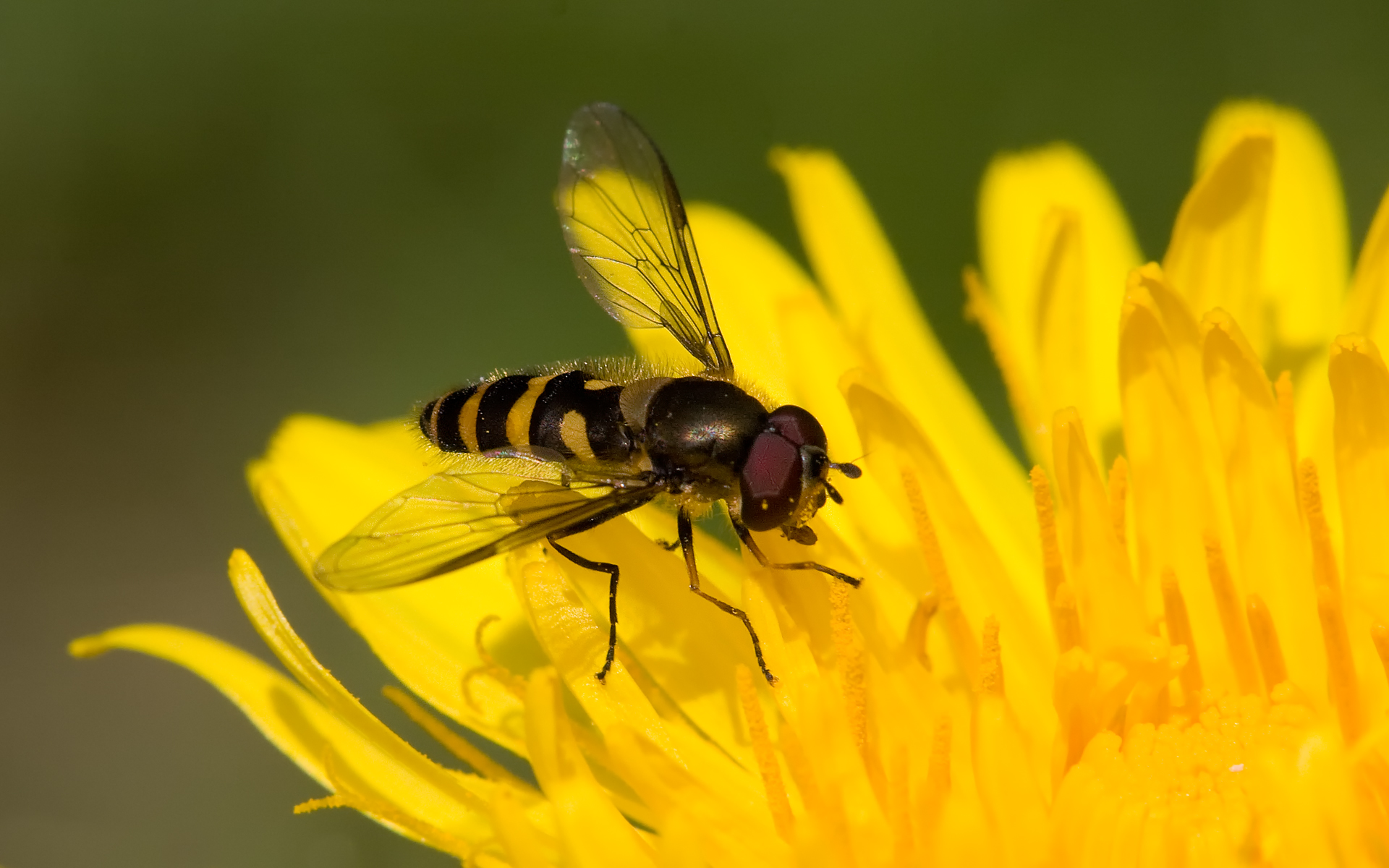
- male
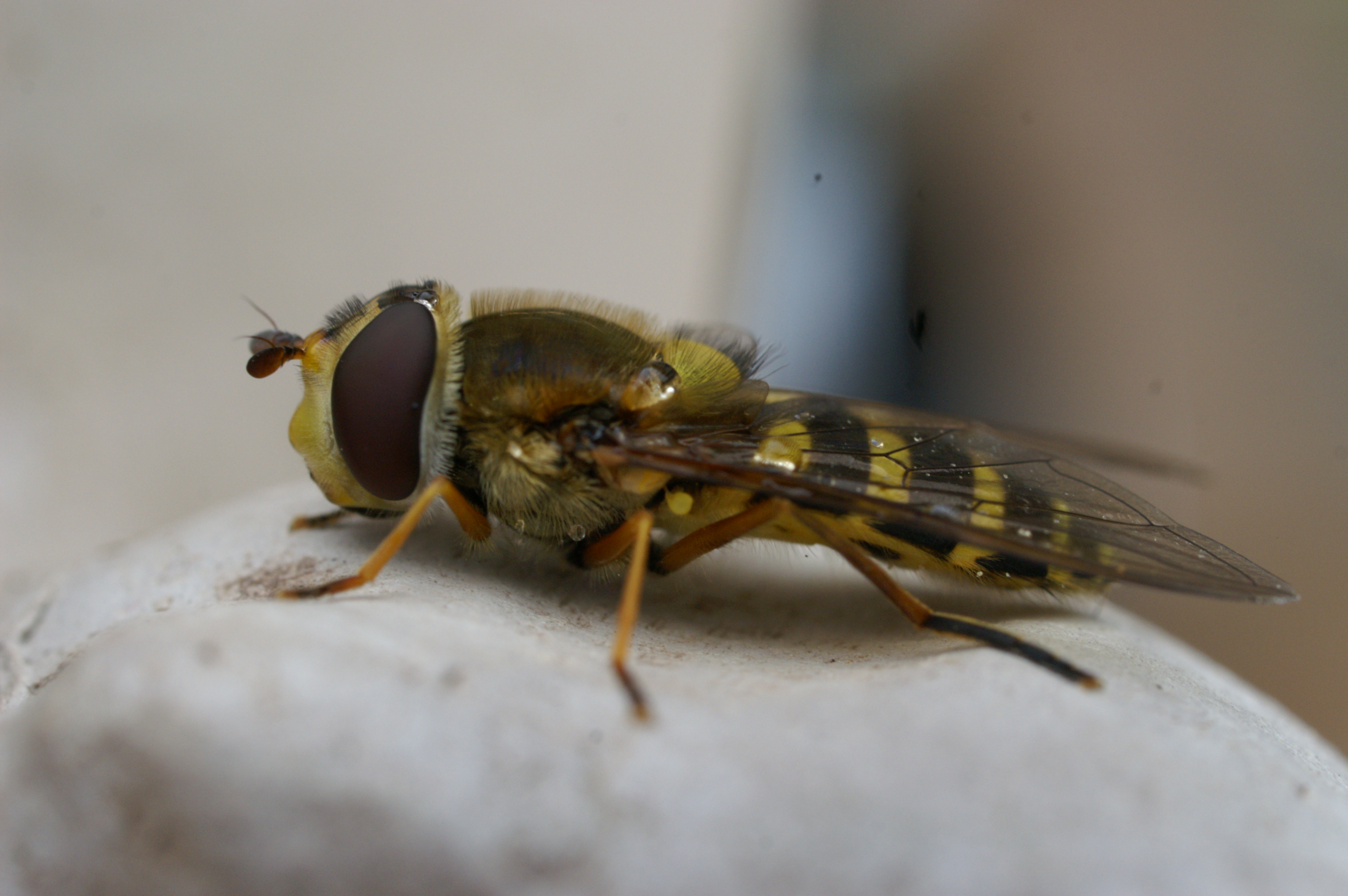
- female

Scientific classification
- Kingdom: Animalia
- Phylum: Arthropoda
- Class: Insecta
- Order: Diptera
- Family: Syrphidae
- Genus: Parasyrphus
- Species: P. annulatus

Binomial name
- Parasyrphus annulatus (Zetterstedt, 1838)

Synonyms
- Scaeva annulatus Zetterstedt, 1838

= Parasyrphus annulatus =

Species of fly

Parasyrphus annulatus is a Palearctic species of hoverfly.

== Description ==
External images For terms see Morphology of Diptera
Wing length 5-5.8 mm. Tibiae and tarsi 1 and 2 yellow. Thorax dorsum dull green. Femorae 3 black with yellow base and apex. Female frons with large dust marks. The male genitalia are figured by Hippa (1968). See references for determination.

== Distribution ==
Palearctic Fennoscandia South to Alpes Maritimes. Ireland East through Northern Europe and Central Europe. North Italy and Yugoslavia, then European Russia and Caucasus on to Siberia and the Russian Far East to the Pacific coast (Kuril Isles).

== Biology ==
Habitat: Larix, other coniferous forest, Quercus forest. Flowers visited include white umbellifers, Allium, Caltha, Cardamine, Euphorbia, Galium, Inula, Ligustrum, Meum, Prunus spinosa, Pyrus communis, Ranunculus, Rubus idaeus, Sambucus nigra, Sorbus aucuparia, Viburnum opulus. The flight period is May to August. The larva is aphid feeding.
