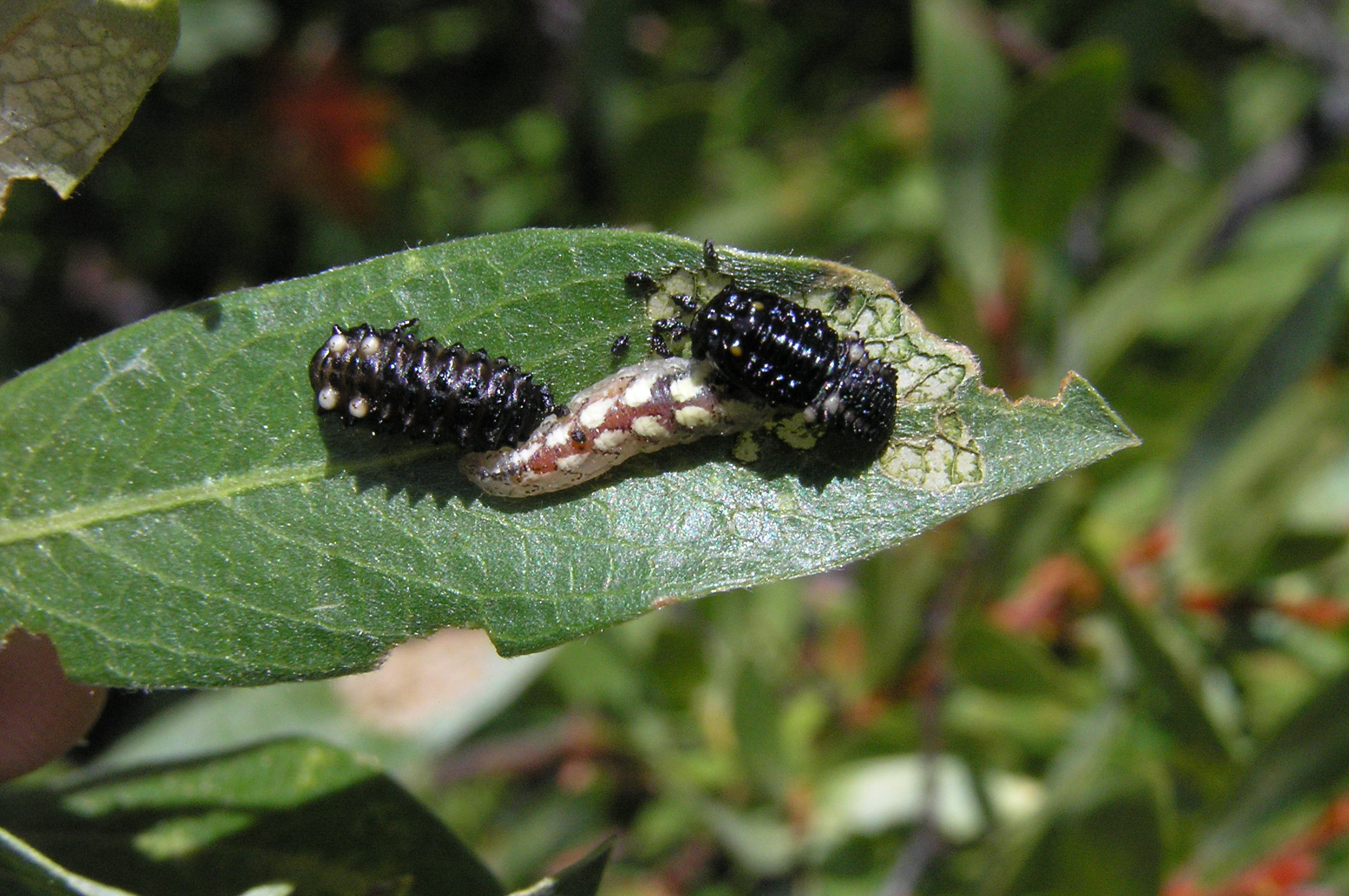
- Larva of P. melanderi (pale) resting between a pupating C. aeneicollis larva (l.) and a C. aeneicollis pupa (r.).

Scientific classification
- Kingdom: Animalia
- Phylum: Arthropoda
- Class: Insecta
- Order: Diptera
- Family: Syrphidae
- Genus: Parasyrphus
- Species: P. melanderi

Binomial name
- Parasyrphus melanderi (Curran, 1925)

Synonyms
- Scaeva relicta Zetterstedt, 1838:603 Parasyrphus relictus Zetterstedt Stenosyrphus melanderi Curran 1925:103

= Parasyrphus melanderi =

Species of fly

Parasyrphus melanderi is a flower fly (family Syrphidae) that is best known as a larval predator on the leaf beetle Chrysomela aeneicollis in the Sierra Nevada range of California.

== Description ==
Adults are medium-sized flies (approximately 6-11mm). The dorsal side of the fourth abdominal segment (and usually the third segment) have an entire yellow band (rather than black), and the face has a black median stripe. In males, the ventral side of the abdomen (sternites) has few or no distinct markings, and in females, the sternites have spots or triangles and the facial stripe is no more than one-quarter the as wide as the face. Eggs of P. melanderi are white and are smaller than the eggs of their prey Chrysomela aeneicollis in California. Mature P. melanderi larvae are 14–16mm long and approximately 3mm in diameter. Larvae have pale markings with thin dark brown stripes anterior to them.

== Range ==
The holotype of this species was collected by Doctor Melander on Mount Constitution, Washington on July 22, 1919. Vockeroth (1992) described the range as boreal and western Canada. Populations have been documented feeding on Chrysomela aeneicollis in the eastern Sierra Nevada, California.

== Habitat ==
These flies are found in cool moist habitats near lakes or streams, where their larval prey (Chrysomeline leaf beetles) occur. These habitats are often found at high elevations, especially at lower latitudes.

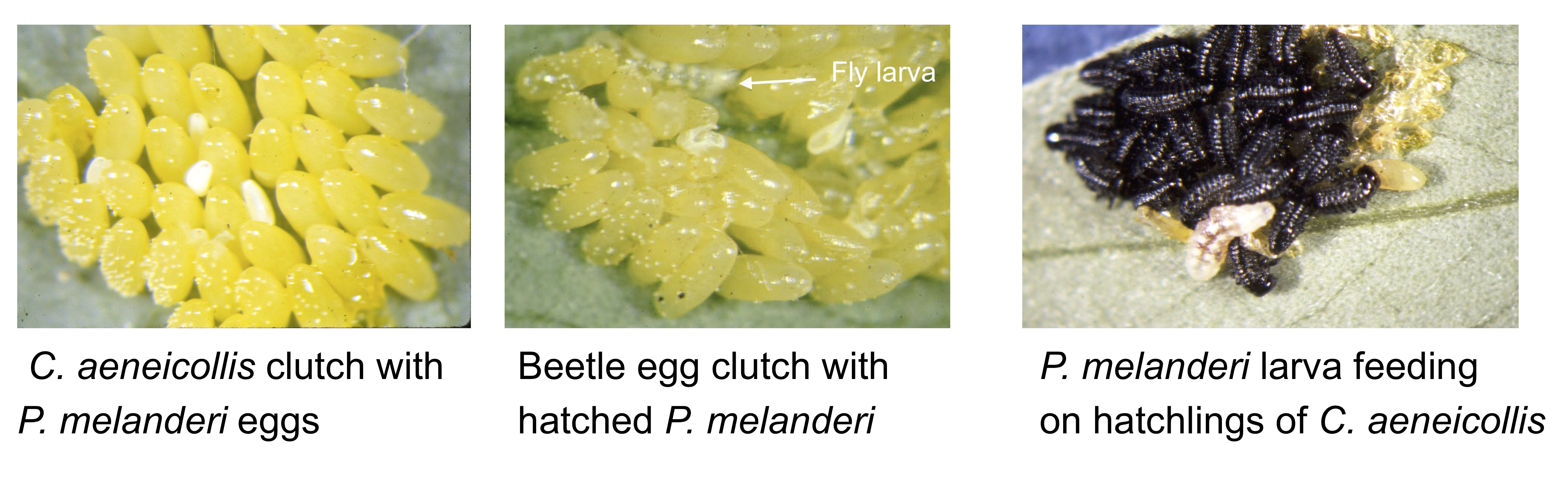

== Ecology ==
Parasyrphus melanderi is a major natural enemy of Chrysomela aeneicollis, a leaf beetle in the subfamily Chrysomelinae. Beetle larvae possess external defensive secretion glands, from which they evert volatile secretions that contain salicylaldehyde, which is derived from host plant salicyl glucosides. Female P. melanderi lay their eggs between the beetle eggs, and fly larvae hatch before the beetles do. Fly larvae first consume beetle eggs, then beetle hatchlings, and continue to consume beetle larvae until they pupate on their willow host leaves. The fly larvae show no evidence for being repelled by the beetle larval secretion, and they are probably attracted to it like their congener Parasyrphus nigritarsis, which shows very similar egg laying and larval feeding behaviors and prey use. A video of P. nigritarsis predatory behavior provides a good visual representation of the feeding behavior of P. melanderi.

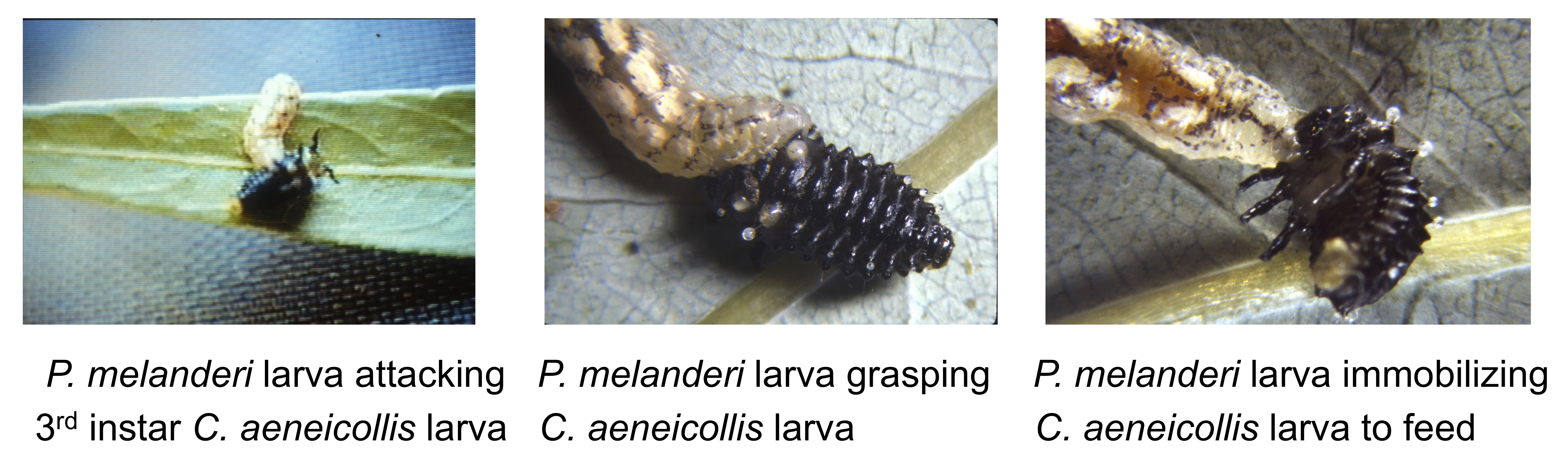

== Taxonomy ==
Adults were originally described by Curran (1924), page 103 under the name Stenosyrphus melanderi. Vockeroth (1992) considered P. melanderi to possibly belong to Parasyrphus relictus, and the characteristics described above were identical in his key to Parasyrphus species. Yet he also described some specimens as having yellow femora, especially for the hind leg, and if there are two species, he considered the specimens with yellow femora to be P. melanderi. Specimens of P. relictus and P. melanderi differ from Parasyrphus nigritarsis in that the former possess a dark facial stripe, which P. nigritarsis lacks.
