= Parasyrphus tarsatus =

Scientific classification
- Kingdom: Animalia
- Phylum: Arthropoda
- Clade: Pancrustacea
- Class: Insecta
- Order: Diptera
- Family: Syrphidae
- Genus: Parasyrphus
- Species: P. tarsatus

Binomial name
- Parasyrphus tarsatus (Enderlein, 1838)

Synonyms
- Petersina lanata Enderlein, 1938; Scaeva dryadis Holmgren, 1869; Scaeva tarsata Enderlein, 1838; Syrphus adolescens Walker, 1849; Syrphus bryantii Johnson, 1898; Syrphus contumax Osten Sacken, 1875; Syrphus monachus Hull, 1930; Syrphus nigropilosa Curran, 1927; Syrphus sodalis Williston, 1887

Species of fly

Parasyrphus tarsatus is a species of syrphid fly in the family Syrphidae. It is found in Europe.
