= 1903 Newmarket by-election =

UK parliamentary by-election

← 1900	2 January 1903	1906 →

Candidate	Rose	Brassey
Party	Liberal	Conservative
Popular vote	4,414	3,907
Percentage	53.0%	47.0%
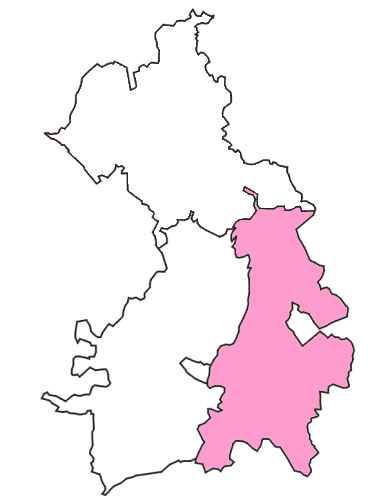
MP before election
Harry McCalmont
Conservative
Subsequent MP
Charles Day Rose
Liberal

The 1903 Newmarket by-election was a parliamentary by-election held on 2 January 1903 to fill a vacancy in the United Kingdom House of Commons for the Eastern or Newmarket Division of Cambridgeshire.

== Vacancy ==
The vacancy occurred with the sudden death of the sitting Conservative Member of Parliament, Colonel Harry McCalmont on 8 December 1902. McCalmont had been MP for Newmarket since 1895.

== Electoral history ==
At the previous election, in 1900, he had been returned with a majority of 1,077 votes.

General election 1900: Newmarket
Party	Candidate	Votes	%	±%
Conservative	Harry McCalmont	4,295	57.2	+5.1
Liberal	Charles Rose	3,218	42.8	−5.1
Majority		1,077	14.4	+10.2
Turnout		7,513	79.3	−3.6
Conservative hold		Swing	+5.1	

== The candidates and campaign ==
Nominations for the election were made on 26 December 1902. There were two candidates: Leonard Brassey for the Conservatives, and Charles Rose for the Liberals. Rose had also contested the seat in 1900. Both candidates were involved in the horse racing industry, the major employer in and around the town of Newmarket.

An important factor in the election was the religious beliefs of the candidates. The Church Association, an evangelical Protestant organisation, interrogated both of the men. Rose stated that he strenuously supported Protestant principles and opposed any legislation that would undermine the ascendency of Protestantism. This satisfied the Association, and was probably responsible for a large number of Evangelical Christian voters switching allegiance from the Conservatives to the Liberals.

== Polling and result ==
The election took place on Friday 2 January 1903. The poll was heavy and motor cars were widely used to bring voters to the polls.

The result of the election was announced on Saturday 3 January at Cambridge Shire Hall. Rose won the seat for the Liberals by a majority of 507 votes.

Charles Rose

Newmarket by-election, 1903
Party	Candidate	Votes	%	±%
Liberal	Charles Rose	4,414	53.0	+10.2
Conservative	Leonard Brassey	3,907	47.0	−10.2
Majority		507	6.0	N/A
Turnout		8,321	86.2	+6.9
Liberal gain from Conservative		Swing	+10.2	

== Aftermath ==
Rose held the seat at the ensuing election in 1906.

General election 1906: Newmarket
Party	Candidate	Votes	%	±%
Liberal	Charles Rose	4,666	54.6	+1.6
Conservative	George Henry Verrall	3,883	45.4	−1.6
Majority		783	9.2	+3.2
Turnout		8,549	86.1	−0.1
Liberal hold		Swing	+1.6	

Brassey subsequently became MP for North Northamptonshire in 1910.

== See also ==
- List of United Kingdom by-elections (1900–1918)
