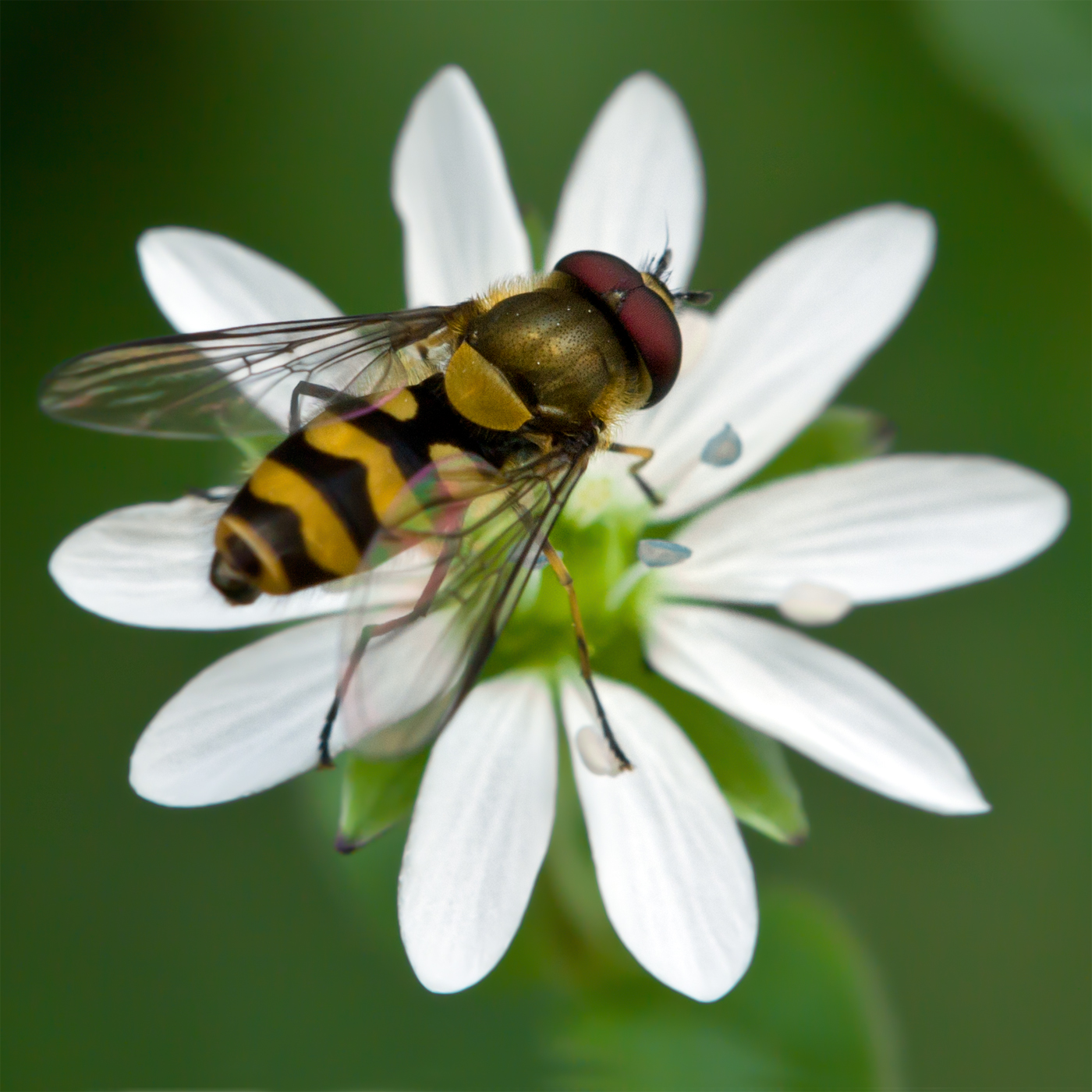
- male
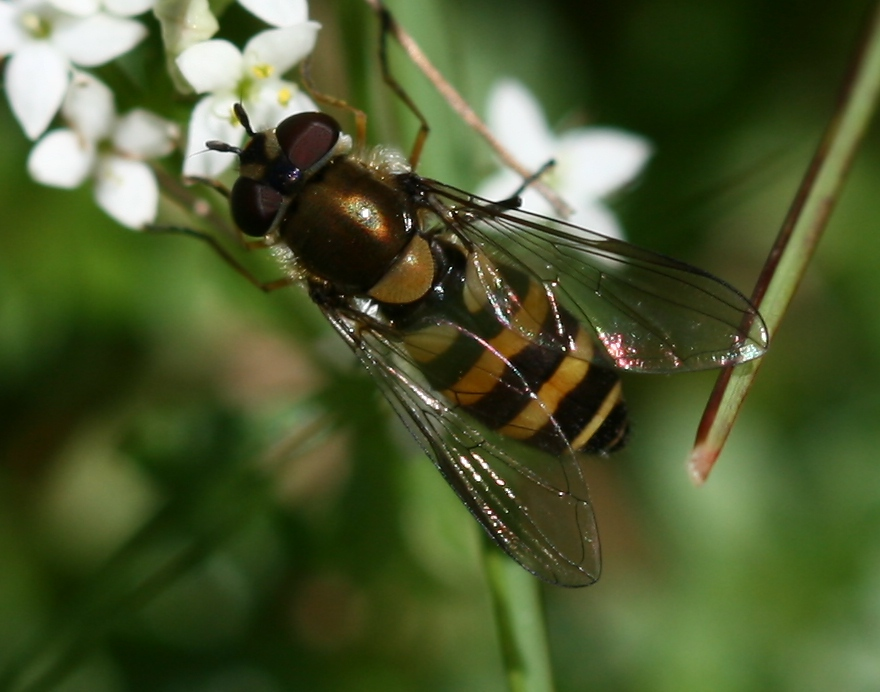
- female

Scientific classification
- Kingdom: Animalia
- Phylum: Arthropoda
- Class: Insecta
- Order: Diptera
- Family: Syrphidae
- Genus: Parasyrphus
- Species: P. lineolus

Binomial name
- Parasyrphus lineolus (Zetterstedt, 1843)

Synonyms
- Scaeva lineolus Zetterstedt, 1843

= Parasyrphus lineolus =

Species of fly

Parasyrphus lineolus is a Holarctic species of hoverfly.

== Description ==
External images For terms see Morphology of Diptera
Wing length 7·25-8·25 mm. Black face stripe. Leg 3 black with at most knee yellow, apex of tibiae 3 black. Tarsi 1 all segments black. Pterostigma dark grey. The male genitalia are figured by Hippa (1968). and Vockeroth (1969). The Larva is described and figured by Heiss (1938) . See references for determination.

== Distribution ==
Palearctic Fennoscandia South to the Pyrenees. Ireland East through Central Europe and South Europe (North Italy and the Balkans), then East into European Russia and from the Urals through Siberia to the Pacific coast (Kamchatka, Sakhalin Is.) Nearctic Alaska to Quebec South to Colorado and New Mexico.

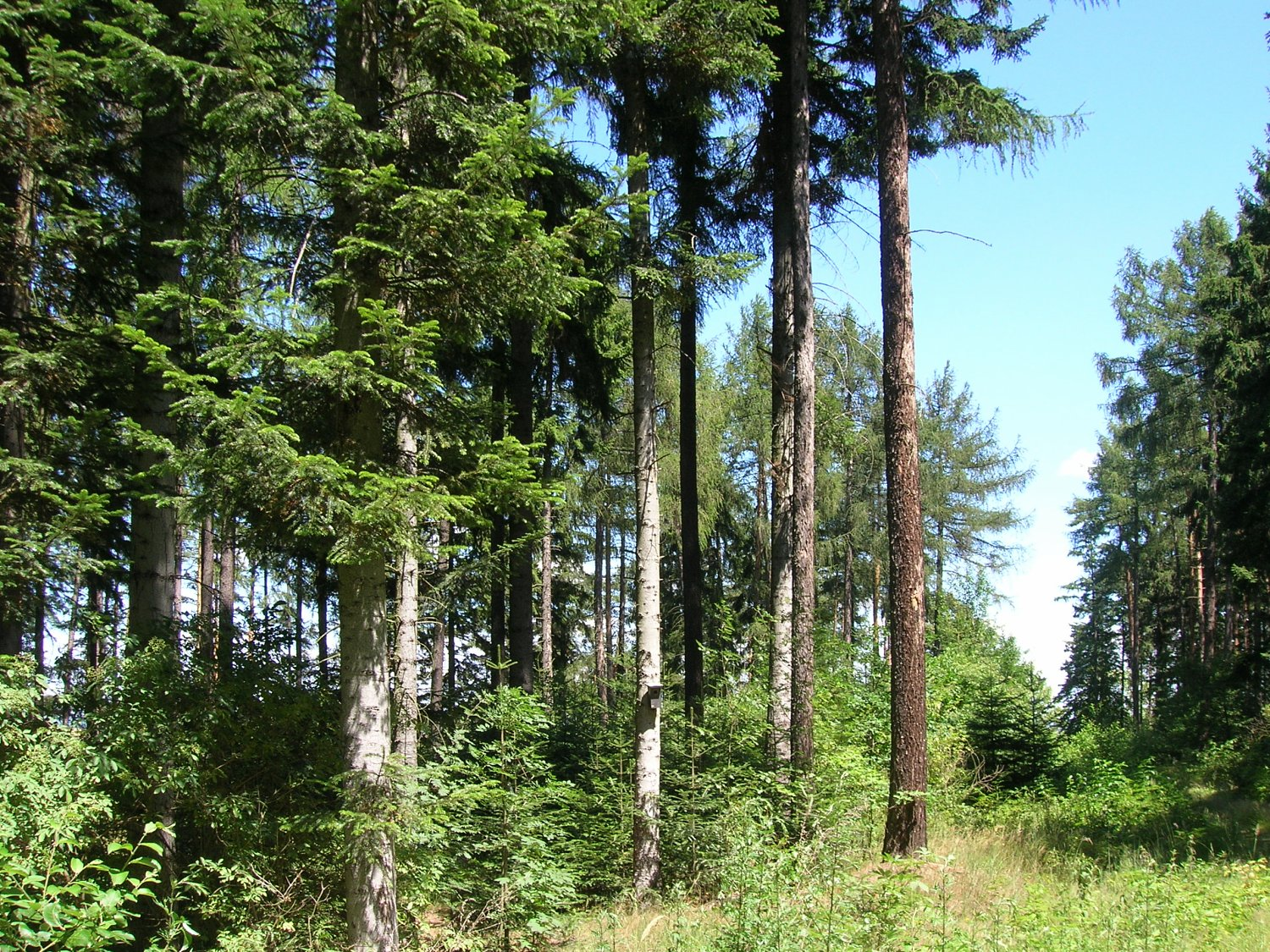
Habitat.Czech republic

== Biology ==
Habitat: Abies, Picea, Pinus forest. Flowers visited include yellow composites, white umbellifers, Acer platanoides, Achilea, Alchemilla, Anemone nemorosa, Calluna vulgaris, Caltha, Cardaminopsis, Galium, Inula, Meum, Petasites albus, Potentilla erecta, Prunus, Ranunculus, Rubus fruticosus, Salix, Sambucus nigra, Sorbus aucuparia, Taraxacum, Triplospermum inodorum, Valeriana officinalis, Veronica, Viburnum. The flight period is April to July. The larva is aphid feeding.
