= Pseudolimnophila inornata =

Scientific classification
- Domain: Eukaryota
- Kingdom: Animalia
- Phylum: Arthropoda
- Class: Insecta
- Order: Diptera
- Family: Limoniidae
- Genus: Pseudolimnophila
- Species: P. inornata

Binomial name
- Pseudolimnophila inornata (Osten Sacken, 1869)

Species of fly

Pseudolimnophila inornata is a species of limoniid crane fly in the family Limoniidae.

== Subspecies ==
These two subspecies belong to the species Pseudolimnophila inornata:

- Pseudolimnophila inornata inornata
- Pseudolimnophila inornata vidua Alexander, 1943
