= Sir Charles Rose, 1st Baronet =

British Baronet (1847–1913)

Sir Charles Rose

Sir Charles Day Rose, 1st Baronet (23 August 1847 – 20 April 1913) was a British-Canadian businessman, race horse breeder, yachtsman, and Liberal politician.

Member of parliament for Newmarket and President of the Royal Aero Club, he has been suggested as the inspiration for Toad in The Wind in the Willows.

== Biography ==
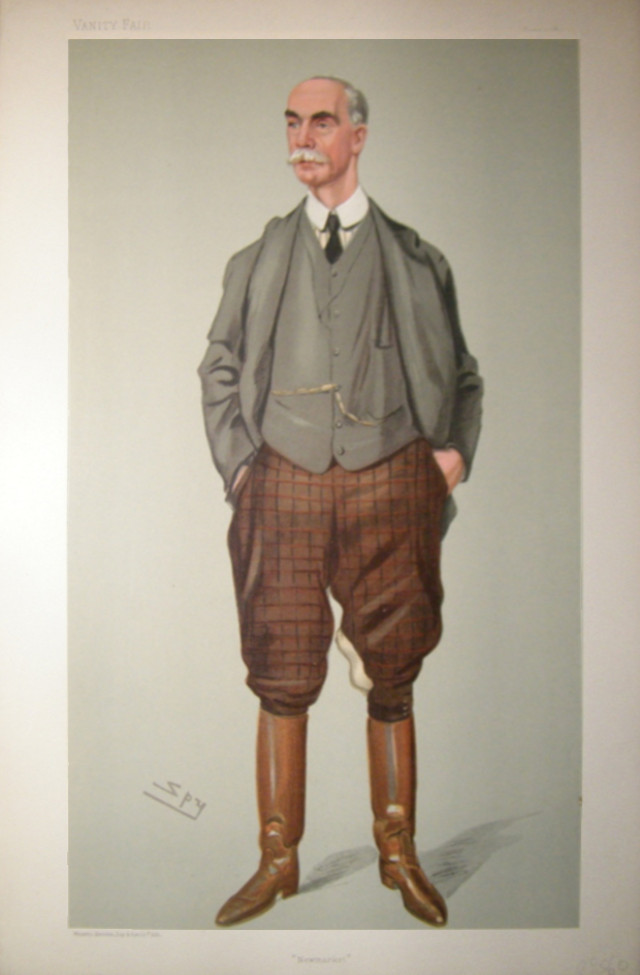
Rose caricatured by Spy (Leslie Ward) for Vanity Fair

Born in Montreal, he was the second son of Sir John Rose, 1st Baronet. His father moved from Scotland to Canada, where he was successively Solicitor General, Minister of Public Works and Minister of Finance.

Rose was educated at the High School of Montreal and Rugby School. He was commissioned into the Montreal Garrison Artillery, and repelled the Fenian raid of 1870. He subsequently entered business as a partner in an American bank based in the City of London and part of the syndicate promoting the Canadian Pacific Railway.

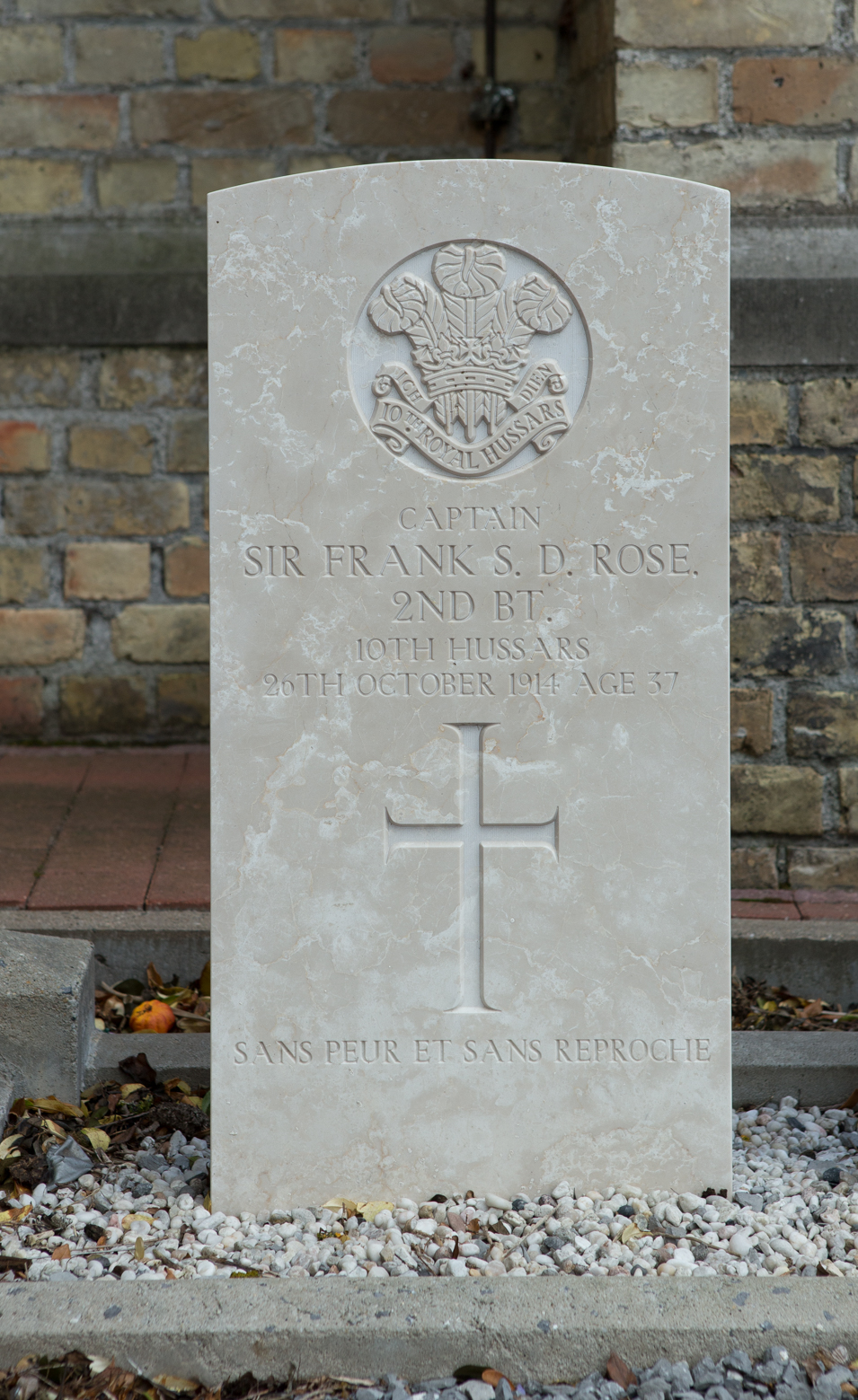
Grave of Rose's son Frank Stanley Rose in Zandvoorde Churchyard

In the late 1880s and early 1890s, he was a leading horse race breeder, based at Newmarket, Suffolk. His most successful horse was Ravensbury, but it was overshadowed by Isinglass, owned by Harry McCalmont, Conservative MP for Newmarket. He was also the owner and breeder of the influential stallion Cyllene. He was elected a member of the Jockey Club in 1891. In 1893, Rose took up yachting, competing in a number of competitive events and was a member of the Royal Victoria Yacht Club.

Rose was created a baronet of "Hardwick House in the Parish of Whitchurch in the County of Oxford" on 19 July 1909. He had completed the purchase of Hardwick House shortly beforehand. Rose is said to have been one of the models for "Toad" of Toad Hall in the 1908 children's book The Wind in the Willows by Kenneth Grahame and Grahame's illustrator E. H. Shepherd used parts of Hardwick House in his drawings.

At the 1900 general election, he stood as a Liberal candidate for the Newmarket constituency, but failed to unseat the sitting Conservative member and fellow horse breeder, Colonel Harry McCalmont. In December 1902, McCalmont died suddenly and Rose won the ensuing by-election held in January 1903. He held the seat at the 1906 election, but was defeated in January 1910. He regained the seat when a further election was held in December of the same year.

Another of Sir Charles's interests was aviation, and he was president of the Royal Aero Club. In April 1913, he was returning from a flight at Hendon Aerodrome by motor car when he died from a heart attack at age 65.

== Family ==
In 1871, Rose married Eliza McClean and they had four sons and one daughter. His two eldest sons both died in the Second Boer War. His final surviving son, Frank Stanley Rose, succeeded him in the baronetcy, but died less than two years later on 26 October 1914 in the First World War. His son Charles Henry Rose (1912–1966) became the 3rd Baronet.

Parliament of the United Kingdom
Preceded by Harry McCalmont	Member of Parliament for Newmarket; 1903 – January 1910	Succeeded by George Henry Verrall
Preceded by George Henry Verrall	Member of Parliament for Newmarket; December 1910 – 1913	Succeeded by John Denison-Pender
Baronetage of the United Kingdom
New creation	Baronet (of Hardwick House); 1909 – 1913	Succeeded by Frank Stanley Rose
