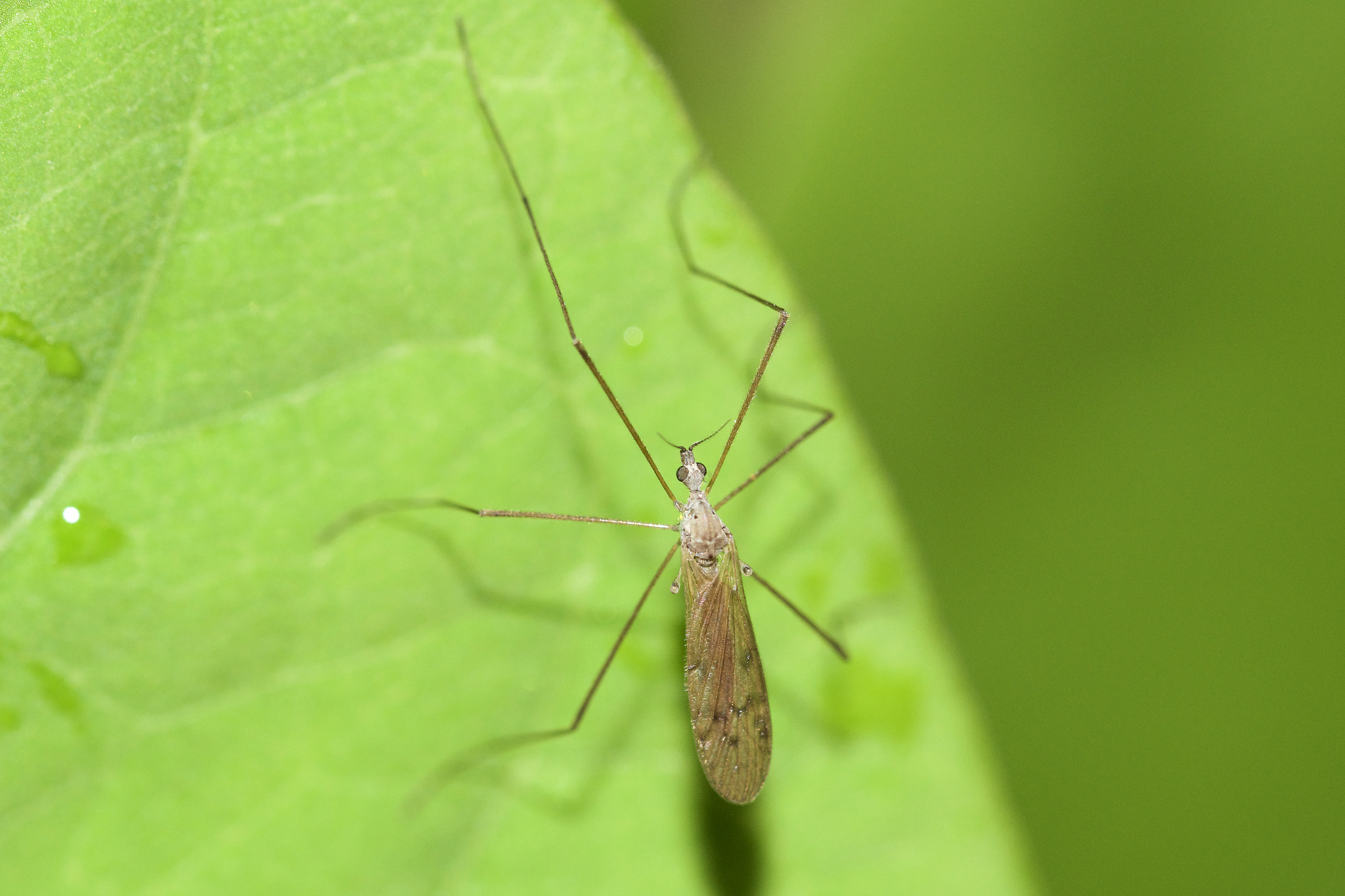

Scientific classification
- Kingdom: Animalia
- Phylum: Arthropoda
- Class: Insecta
- Order: Diptera
- Family: Limoniidae
- Genus: Pseudolimnophila
- Species: P. luteipennis

Binomial name
- Pseudolimnophila luteipennis (Osten Sacken, 1859)

Synonyms
- Limnophila luteipennis Osten Sacken, 1859

= Pseudolimnophila luteipennis =

Species of fly

Pseudolimnophila luteipennis is a species of limoniid crane fly in the family Limoniidae.
