= Harry McCalmont =

British politician

Colonel Harry McCalmont CB
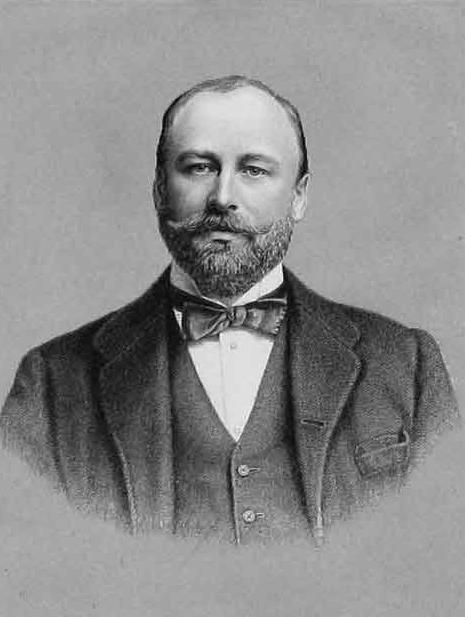
- Born: 31 May 1861; Richmond, Surrey, England
- Died: 8 December 1902 (aged 41); St James's, London, England
- Spouse(s): Amy Miller; Winifred de Bathe
- Military career
- Allegiance: United Kingdom
- Branch: British Army
- Rank: Colonel

Colonel Harry Leslie Blundell McCalmont, CB (30 May 1861 – 8 December 1902) was a British army officer, race-horse owner, yachtsman and Conservative party politician.

== Life ==
He was the son of Hugh Barklie Blundell McCalmont, and was educated at Eton College before gaining a commission in the 6th Regiment of Foot in 1881. He subsequently transferred to the Scots Guards four years later.

In 1888, his millionaire great uncle, Hugh McCalmont died. Under the conditions of his will, a trust fund was established paying Harry McCalmont 2,000 Pounds sterling a year for seven years, after which he would inherit the remainder of the estate. He used this income to purchase the Cheveley Park estate and stud farm near Newmarket from the Duke of Rutland. There he established a successful stable of racehorses. Among his horses were Timothy, a winner of the Ascot Gold Cup and Alexandra Plate and Isinglass winner of The Derby, St. Leger Stakes and Epsom Gold Cup. He retired from the regular army in 1889, joining the part-time 6th (2nd Warwickshire Militia) Battalion, Royal Warwickshire Regiment, being promoted to Lieutenant-Colonel in command on 8 March 1898. He was a keen yachtsman and member of the Royal Yacht Squadron. He commissioned the building of Tarantula, the first turbine-powered steam yacht in the World.

He also commissioned SY Banshee and the 1265 ton SY Geralda (1894, one of the first steam yachts to exceed 1000 tons) built by Fairfield Shipbuilding and Engineering Company.

In 1895 a general election was called, and McCalmont was selected as Conservative candidate for the Newmarket constituency, then held by the Liberals. He was successful, unseating the sitting Member of Parliament, Sir George Newnes.

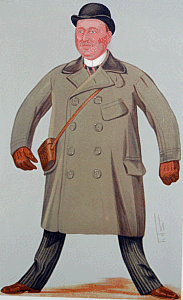
Colonel Harry McCalmont: caricature by Leslie Ward ("Spy"), 1889

The Second Boer War broke out in 1899, and in the following year McCalmont's battalion went to South Africa, serving in Cape Colony and Orange River Colony. He was made a Companion of the Order of the Bath (CB) for his services in the war. A general election was held in 1900, and McCalmont, who was still in South Africa, was re-elected with an increased majority. His opponent in the election was C. D. Rose, owner of the racehorse Ravensbury which had been a rival to Isinglass.

Through both his racing interests and the connections of his second wife, McCalmont advanced in society. King Edward VII visited McCalmont for shooting at Cheveley park in November 1902, as part of a trip to Newmarket.

He died suddenly at his London home from heart failure in December 1902.

== Family ==
He was married to Amy Miller, daughter of Major John Miller, who died in 1889; and then in 1897 to Winifred de Bathe, daughter of Sir Henry de Bathe, 4th Baronet. A sister-in-law was Lillie Langtry, who married the son of Sir Henry, Hugo Gerald de Bathe, in 1899. He left no issue, and the bulk of his fortune passed to his second cousin, Dermot McCalmont, son of his father's first cousin, Colonel Sir Hugh McCalmont, KCB.

== Arms ==
Coat of arms of Harry McCalmont
Notes Confirmed 28 September 1892 by Henry Farnham Burke, Deputy Ulster King of Arms. Crest A griffin's head erased Proper charged with a fleur-de-lis Or. Escutcheon Gules a cross vairy Argent and Azure between four fleurs-de-lis Or. Motto Nil Desperandum

Parliament of the United Kingdom
Preceded by Sir George Newnes	Member of Parliament for Newmarket; 1895 – 1902	Succeeded by Charles Day Rose
