= Cheveley =

Village in Cambridgeshire, England

Coordinates: 52.22°N 0.46°E

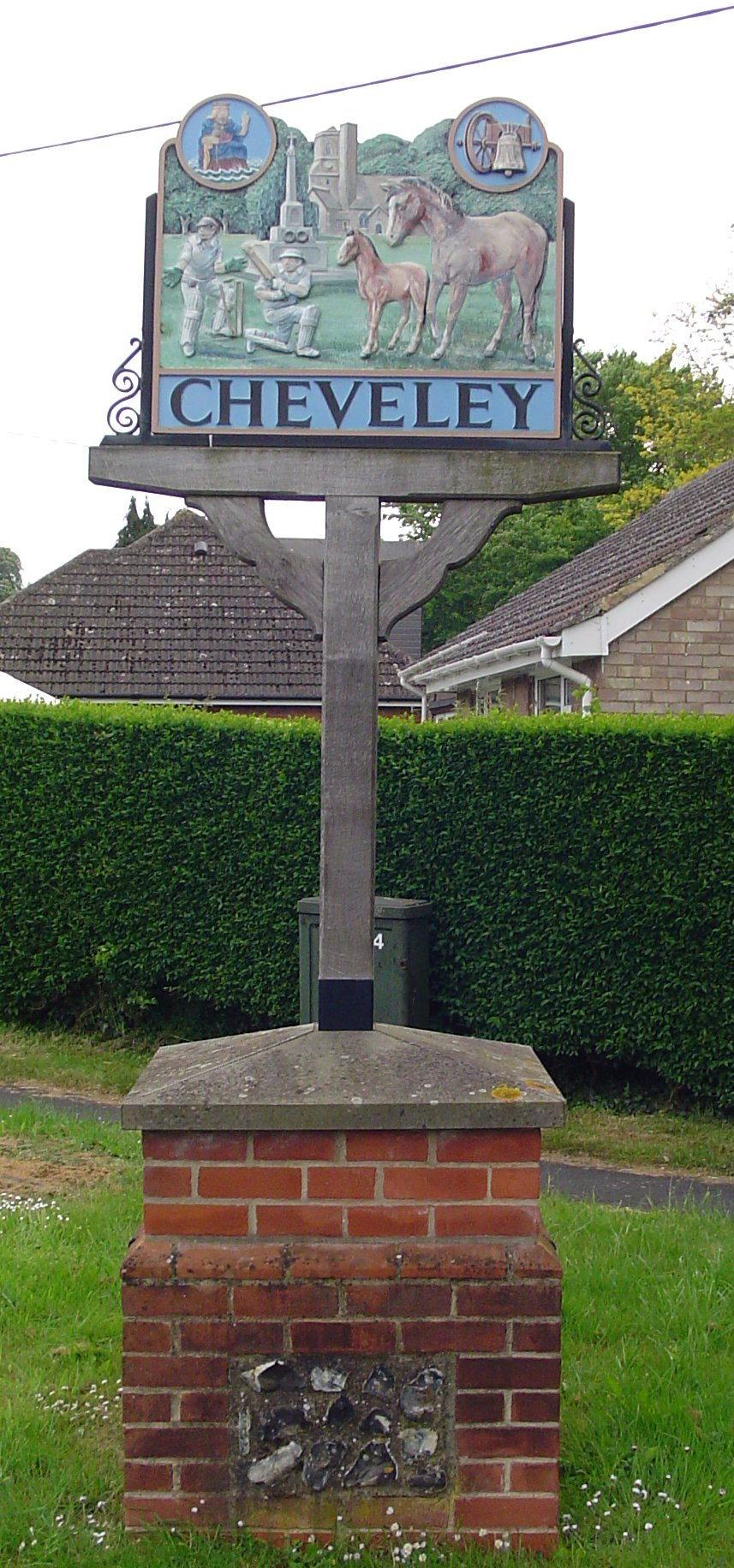
- The village sign

- Location within Cambridgeshire
- Population: 1,990 (2011)
- OS grid reference: TL684607
- District: East Cambridgeshire
- Shire county: Cambridgeshire
- Region: East
- Country: England
- Sovereign state: United Kingdom
- Post town: Newmarket
- Postcode district: CB8

The village of Cheveley is situated in the county of Cambridgeshire and lies about four miles east-south-east of the market town of Newmarket. The population of the civil parish was 1,990 at the 2011 Census. Cheveley falls within the local government district of East Cambridgeshire. Geographically, Cheveley stands on the third highest point in Cambridgeshire at 127 metres (417 ft) above sea level.

The hamlet of Cheveley Park, a mile from Cheveley, is the home of Cheveley Park Stud.

== History ==
The origin of the village dates to the tenth century. Its name is first attested in the Domesday Book of 1086 and derives from Old English. The second element derives from Old English lēah 'open land'. The first element was long thought to be the word chaff, but more recent research suggests that Old English ceaf could also denote the chaffinch. Thus the name probably meant 'open land characterised by chaffinches'. In the mid-2010s, a smithy in use between c.1100 and c. 1220 was excavated by Headland Archaeology. It had been temporarily abandoned in the 1140s and 1150s, probably due to the chaos of The Anarchy.

== Land use in Cheveley ==
The trees of the Duke of Rutland's old park, no longer a ducal domain, spread over into the roadway and gardens of this village near the Suffolk border. The 5th Duke rebuilt the main road to Newmarket in 1796, naming it Duchess Drive.

A linear village, Cheveley's non-residential land use consists almost entirely of paddock land used by studs, the most notable being the Cheveley Park Stud, after which the Cheveley Park Stakes are named.

== War memorial ==
By the road outside the church, in memory of the men who did not come back, stands a soldier with bowed head in a niche below a cross. The Jacobean Rectory has great (possibly 18th-century) iron gates, said to have come from the Alington family's seat at Horseheath.

== Church ==
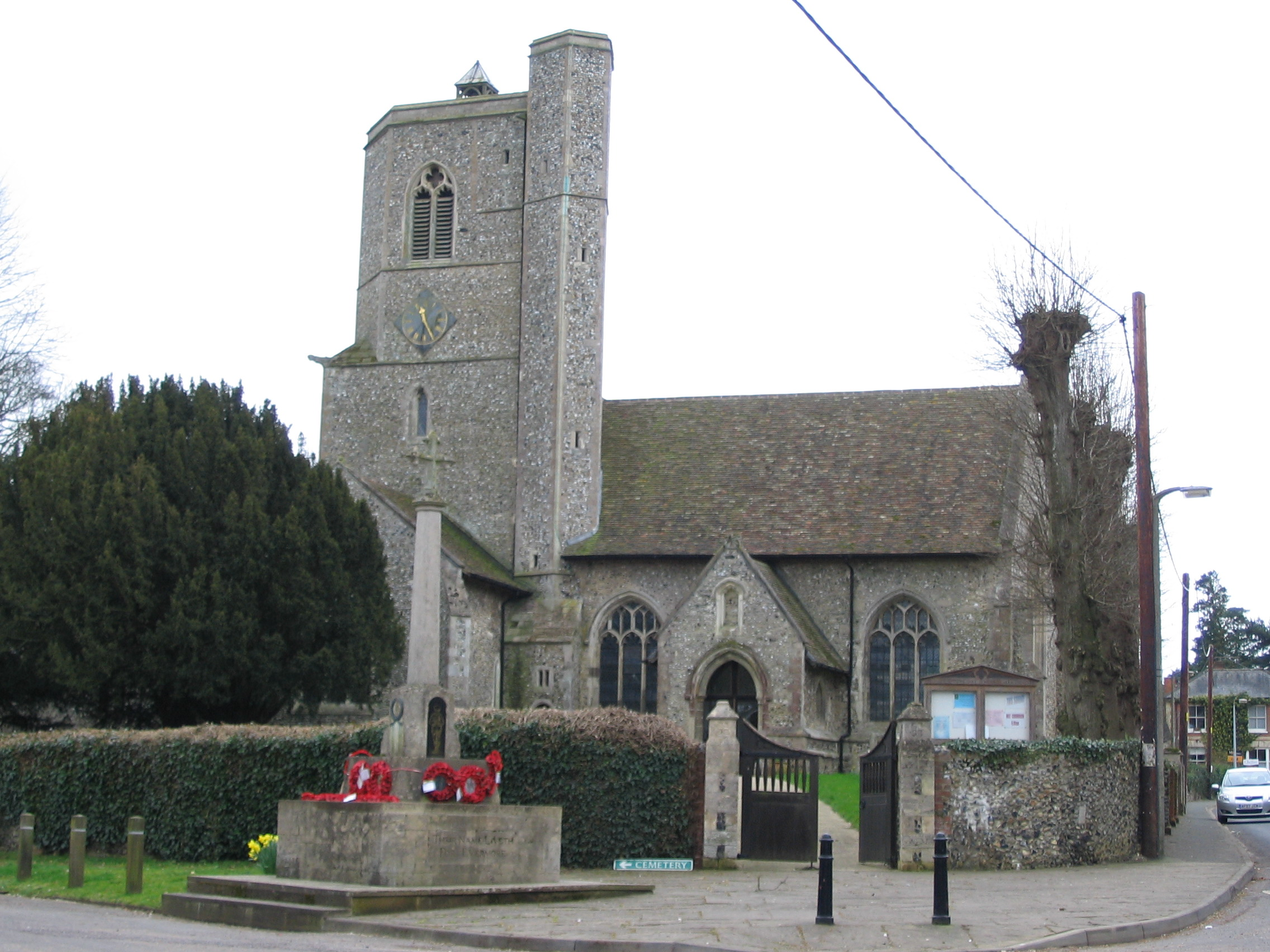
Cheveley church

The fine aisleless church, in the shape of a cross, has a 600-year-old tower beginning square and ending with eight sides, a turret rising from the ground, with a winding stairway to the belfry and a summit once used for beacon fires. The fine arches with clustered pillars on which the tower rests are the glory of the church indoors, recalling the days when there were four guilds here, each guild keeping a light burning on these piers. Three of the four brackets for the lights are still here, one carved with a face and one a grotesque little fellow with his legs doubled behind him.

The church belongs to England's three great building centuries, and still has the oak screen set in its chancel arch 600 years ago. The choir-stalls are 'modern' with fine carvings of dogs, fishes, birds, bats, dragons, and a wolf. There are two Jacobean chairs, and a richly inlaid one of cypress wood, the seat opening to form a chest; it is thought to be the throne of a Venetian Doge of the 14th century. A little glass in a transept window is older still. The painted font is 19th-century, most unusual in its blaze of colour, a new dress in mediaeval style.

Under an arch on the chancel wall is one of the Folkes family, in a red cloak, reading a book. He died in 1642. There is a memorial to James Hand, who was Rector for 49 years until 1830.

There are some pictures and a description of the church at the Cambridgeshire Churches website.

== Education ==
Children initially attend the primary school in the village, with many then going on to the nearby secondary school Bottisham Village College.

In the 1920s, one of the pupils at Cheveley Church of England Primary School was Bill Tutte, who later became a noted 20th century mathematician, especially remembered for his brilliant code-breaking activities at Bletchley Park during World War II.

== Amenities ==
Presently, Cheveley has many local amenities. The recreation ground provides an off-road field, where cricket, football, rugby and mere dog walking take place. The Red Lion public house is situated to the south of the village. The local village store, Cheveley Post Office is situated opposite the Red Lion pub.

The Icknield Way Path passes through the village on its 110-mile (180 km) journey from Ivinghoe Beacon in Buckinghamshire to Knettishall Heath in Suffolk. The Icknield Way Trail, a multi-user route for walkers, horse riders and off-road cyclists also passes through the village.

== See also ==
- Cheveley Castle
