= George Henry Verrall =

British horse racing official, entomologist, botanist and Conservative politician

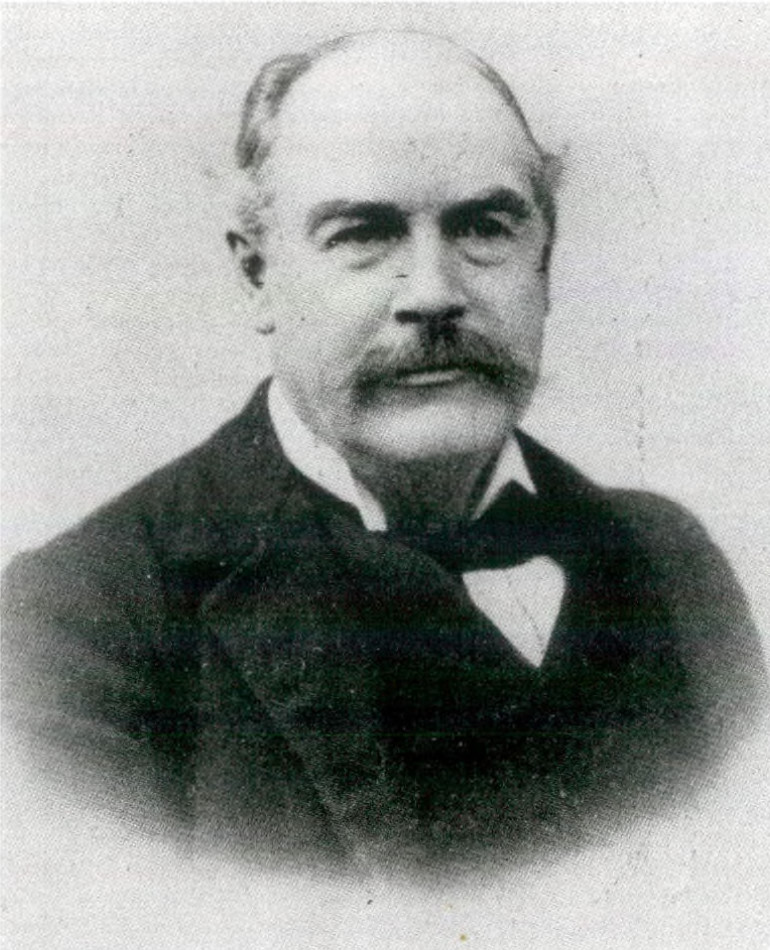
- Born: 7 February 1848
- Died: 16 September 1911 (aged 63)
- Occupation: Politician, botanical collector, scientific collector
- Position held: member of the 29th Parliament of the United Kingdom (1910–1910), President of the Royal Entomological Society (1899–1900)

George Henry Verrall (7 February 1848 – 16 September 1911) was a British horse racing official, entomologist, botanist and Conservative politician.

== Horse racing ==
Verrall was born in Lewes, Sussex. Following education at Lewes Grammar School he became secretary to his elder brother, John Frederick Verrall. John Verrall was a horse-racing official, being clerk of the course at many of the country's biggest meetings. When John died in 1877, George succeeded him. He moved to Newmarket, Suffolk, the centre of the horse-breeding industry, in 1878.

== Entomology ==
Verrall had a keen interest in natural history, particularly entomology. He joined the Entomological Society in 1866, was honorary secretary from 1872–1874 and president from 1899–1900. Verrall was one of the most influential British dipterists and worked extensively on several families with his nephew James Edward Collin, (1876–1968). Verrall purchased the collections of several European dipterists: Ferdinand Kowarz (1838–1914), which contained many types of Hermann Loew (1807–1878); Jacques Marie François Bigot and Pierre-Justin-Marie Macquart (1778–1855). These, together with the flies (between them Verrall and Collin described some 900 species of Diptera) collected by Collin and Verrall himself are in the Hope Entomological Collections at the University of Oxford.

He published two books on the subject:

- Platypezidae, Pipunculidae and Syrphidae of Great Britain. - British flies (1901)
- Stratiomyidae and succeeding families of the Diptera Brachycera of Great Britain- British flies (1909)

A 2011 edition of Dipterists Digest was dedicated to an appreciation of his achievements in the field, on the centenary of his death.

=== The Verrall Association of Entomologists ===
The Verrall Association of Entomologists continues to honour the tradition of an annual supper of entomologists: begun in 1887 by G.H. Verrall as the Annual Entomological Club Supper. The supper enables amateur and professional entomologists to meet once a year at a social gathering as mutual workers in their special branch of science, to exchange ideas, make new friends and meet old ones.

== Botany ==
His interest in botany and conserving wildlife led to Verrall purchasing tracts of Wicken Fen for their preservation. He was able to rediscover a number of species of flora that had been declared extinct sixty years earlier by Cardale Babington, Professor of Botany at the University of Cambridge.

== Politics ==
Politically, Verrall was a strong Unionist, and in 1894 he became chairman of the Newmarket and District Conservative Association. He was a member of Cambridgeshire County Council, Newmarket Urban District Council and Newmarket Board of Guardians. He was in charge of the 1895 campaign that led to Colonel Harry McCalmont winning the parliamentary seat of Newmarket from the Liberals. When McCalmont died in 1902, the Liberal Charles Day Rose regained the seat. In January 1910 he stood against Rose in the general election, becoming Newmarket's Member of Parliament. His period in the Commons was only brief, as Rose regained the seat for the Liberals in the ensuing election in December of the same year.

== Death ==
Verrall, who had been in ill health for some time, had become exhausted by the December 1910 election campaign. After returning from a long holiday abroad, he died of "dropsy" soon after returning to Newmarket in September 1911, aged 64.

== References and sources ==
- Evenhuis, N. L. 1997: Litteratura taxonomica dipterorum (1758–1930). Volume 1 (A-K); Volume 2 (L-Z). - Leiden, Backhuys Publishers 1; 2 VII+1-426; 427–871 786–788, Portr. + Schr.verz.
- Pont, A. C.The type-material of Diptera (Insecta) described by G.H. Verrall and J.E. Collin. Oxford University Museum Publication 3: x + 223 pp. Clarendon Press, Oxford. (1995).

Parliament of the United Kingdom
Preceded by Charles Day Rose	Member of Parliament for Newmarket; January 1910 – December 1910	Succeeded by Charles Day Rose
