= John Denison-Pender =

John Denison-Pender may refer to:

- John Denison-Pender (businessman, born 1855) (1855–1929), chairman and managing director of the Eastern Telegraph Company, now Cable & Wireless
- John Denison-Pender, 1st Baron Pender (1882–1949), his son, British politician and businessman
- John Denison-Pender, 2nd Baron Pender (1907–1965), his son, British civil servant and businessman
