= 1913 Wick Burghs by-election =

UK parliamentary by-election

The 1913 Wick Burghs by-election was a Parliamentary by-election held on 8 December 1913. It was a Scottish Highland constituency that returned one Member of Parliament (MP) to the House of Commons of the United Kingdom, elected by the first past the post voting system. The constituency was a district of burghs representing the parliamentary burghs of Cromarty, Dingwall, Dornoch, Kirkwall, Tain and Wick. The by-election took place during the third anniversary of the Liberal Government's re-election of December 1910. It was thought to be a key indicator to the outcome of the following general election anticipated to take place in 1914–15.

== Vacancy ==
At the January 1910 general election Robert Munro was elected Member of Parliament for Wick Burghs. In 1913 Munro was sworn of the Privy Council and appointed Lord Advocate by H. H. Asquith. This meant he had to resign his seat and seek re-election.

== Electoral history ==
The constituency was created in 1832 and returned Liberals at every election until 1892 when, following a split in the Liberal Party over Irish Home Rule, the seat was won by a Liberal Unionist. Unionist candidates won four consecutive general elections, including 1906 when the Liberal Party swept the country. Against the trend, Munro gained the seat for the Liberals at the January 1910 general election and held it at the December General Election;

Robert Munro

General election December 1910: Wick Burghs Electorate 3,037
Party	Candidate	Votes	%	±%
Liberal	Robert Munro	1,515	53.7	−1.2
Unionist	Arthur Bignold	1,304	46.3	+1.2
Majority		211	7.4	−2.4
Turnout		2,819	92.8	+0.1
Liberal hold		Swing	-1.2	

== Candidates ==
- Robert Munro had quickly established a reputation as a formidable candidate for the Liberal Party, on the back of his unexpected victory in January 1910. He was born in the Scottish highlands, but just outside the constituency in Alness.
- The local Unionists selected a new candidate for this election, in Alexander George Mackenzie.

== Campaign ==
Polling day was set for 8 December. Nominations closed on 1 December to confirm a 2-party contest.

The issue of Irish Home Rule was again at the top of the political agenda as the Liberal Government had introduced the Third Irish Home Rule Bill. The Unionist dominated House of Lords had rejected the bill for a second time and the Liberals were preparing to introduce it for the third and final time. Leading Ulster Unionist politician Sir Edward Carson opposed the bill and sought to rally opposition in Ulster through the creation of the Ulster Volunteers a paramilitary group, armed with weapons supplied by Germany. He called on Unionists to use "all means necessary" to oppose the British Government. Liberals like David Lloyd George criticised Unionists and Carson in particular for acts of treason. Munro received a telegram of support from Lloyd George in which he also took the opportunity to attack Unionist double standards on religious questions: "It is rather sickening to see the upholders of sectarian privileges in England and Wales profess to be the champions of religious equality for Ireland. I wish English and Scottish Tories would concede to English and Welsh Nonconformists the same measure of religious equality and fair play as will be guaranteed to Ulster Episcopalians and Presbyterians under the Home Rule Bill."

== Result ==
There was a swing of 4.5% to the Liberals, whose candidate Robert Munro increased his majority over the Unionist;

1913 Wick District by-election Electorate 3,094
Party	Candidate	Votes	%	±%
Liberal	Robert Munro	1,577	58.2	+4.5
Unionist	Alexander George Mackenzie	1,134	41.8	−4.5
Majority		443	16.4	+9.0
Turnout		2,711	87.6	−5.2
Liberal hold		Swing	+4.5	

The increase in the Liberal majority was hailed with exultation by Liberals as a triumphant condemnation of 'Carsonism'. Munro's majority of 443 was the largest ever recorded in the history of the constituency. Munro's explanation was that "the election had been fought on Home Rule first and last".

== Aftermath ==
Carson was to eventually back down and along with his Irish Unionist colleagues, supported an amendment to the Home Rule Bill for the "temporary exclusion of Ulster". A General Election was due to take place by the end of 1915. By the autumn of 1914, the following candidates had been adopted to contest that election;

- Liberal Party: Robert Munro
- Unionist Party:

Due to the outbreak of war, the election never took place. By the 1918 general election, Wick Burghs was abolished as part of the boundary review and the burghs split between Caithness and Sutherland and Ross and Cromarty. Munro was elected for the lowland seat of Roxburgh and Selkirk. Mackenzie did not stand again.
