= Baron Pender =

Barony in the Peerage of the United Kingdom

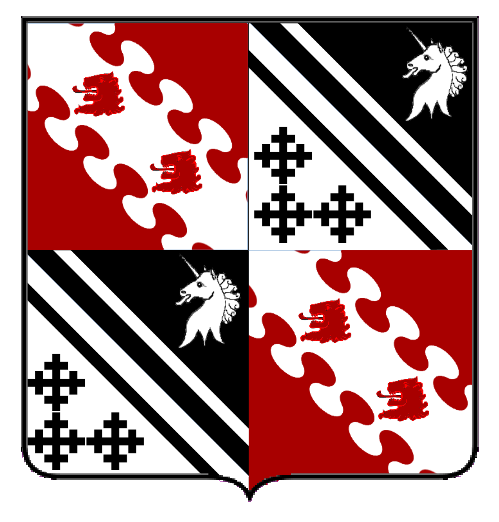
- Crest: 1st a demi-lion Or holding in the dexter paw a sea-axe Proper pommel and hilt Gold and resting the sinister paw on a terrestrial globe Proper, 2nd In front of a sun rising in splendour a dexter arm in bend Proper vested Gules gutte d’eau cuff Erminois the fore-finger pointing to an estoile Or.
- Shield: Quarterly: 1st & 4th Gules on a bend nebuly Argent two lions’ heads erased of the first (Pender), 2nd & 3rd per bend Sable and Argent two bendlets between a unicorn’s head erased in chief and three cross-crosslets in base all counterchanged (Denison).
- Supporters: On either side a figure of Hermes standing on a cable-grapnel the dexter holding in the exterior hand a caduceus and the sinister a flash of lightning all Proper.
- Motto: Persevero

Baron Pender, of Porthcurnow in the County of Cornwall, is a title in the Peerage of the United Kingdom. It was created in 1937 for the former Conservative Member of Parliament for Newmarket and Balham and Tooting, John Denison-Pender. He was the grandson of the businessman Sir John Pender, founder of a number of telegraph companies, Eastern Telegraph, Eastern and South African Telegraph, Europe and Azores Telegraph Company, Australasia and China Telegraph Company, London Platino-Brazilian Telegraph Company, Pacific and European Telegraph Company which later became Cable & Wireless. As of 2016 the title is held by the first Baron's great-grandson, the fourth Baron, who succeeded his father in 2016.

Porthcurnow (or Porthcurno) in Cornwall was the landing site of several international telecommunication cables.

The current Lord Pender is patron of the Porthcurno Telegraph Museum.

Sir James Pender, 1st Baronet, was the uncle of the first Baron Pender.

Baron Pender wrote a single word manifesto when asked to explain why he should remain in the House of Lords, “duty”.

The family seat is North Court, Tilmanstone, Kent.

== Barons Pender (1937) ==
- John Cuthbert Denison Denison-Pender, 1st Baron Pender (1882–1949)
- John Jocelyn Denison-Pender, 2nd Baron Pender (1907–1965)
- John Willoughby Denison-Pender, 3rd Baron Pender (1933–2016)
- Henry John Richard Denison-Pender, 4th Baron Pender (b. 1968)

The heir apparent is the present holder's son the Honourable Miles John Cuthbert Denison-Pender (b. 2000).
