= Wick Burghs (UK Parliament constituency) =

Parliamentary constituency in the United Kingdom, 1832–1918

- Former district of Burghs constituency for the House of Commons
- Major settlements: Cromarty, Dingwall, Dornoch, Kirkwall, Tain and Wick

1832–1918
- Seats: One
- Created from: Cromartyshire and Tain Burghs
- Replaced by: Caithness and Sutherland and Ross and Cromarty

Wick Burghs, sometimes known as Northern Burghs, was a constituency of the House of Commons of the Parliament of the United Kingdom from 1832 to 1918. It elected one Member of Parliament (MP) by the first past the post voting system.

A similar constituency had been known as Tain Burghs from 1708 to 1832.

== Boundaries ==
The constituency was a district of burghs representing the parliamentary burghs of Cromarty, Dingwall, Dornoch, Kirkwall, Tain and Wick. Apart from Cromarty, these burghs had been previously components of Tain Burghs. In 1918 Dornoch and Wick were merged into Caithness and Sutherland, Kirkwall into Orkney and Shetland and Cromarty, Dingwall and Tain into Ross and Cromarty. The first election in Wick Burghs was in 1832. The franchise was extended to wider groups of the population than under the old system of burgh councillors electing a burgh commissioner to participate in the election. From 1832 the votes from each burgh were added together to establish the result.

== Members of Parliament ==
Election	Member	Party
	constituency created	
1832	James Loch	Whig
1852	Samuel Laing	Radical
1857	Lord John Hay	Whig
1859	Samuel Laing	Liberal
1860 by-election	William Keppel, Viscount Bury	Liberal
1865	Samuel Laing	Liberal
1868	George Loch	Liberal
1872 by-election	John Pender	Liberal
1885	John Macdonald Cameron	Liberal
1892	Sir John Pender	Liberal Unionist
1896 by-election	Thomas Hedderwick	Liberal
1900	Sir Arthur Bignold	Liberal Unionist
1910	Robert Munro	Liberal
1916	Robert Munro	Coalition Liberal
1918	constituency abolished	

== Elections ==
=== Elections in the 1830s ===
General election 1832: Wick Burghs
Party	Candidate	Votes	%
Whig	James Loch	Unopposed	
Registered electors		366	
Whig win (new seat)			

General election 1835: Wick Burghs
Party	Candidate	Votes	%
Whig	James Loch	Unopposed	
Registered electors		571	
Whig hold			

General election 1837: Wick Burghs
Party	Candidate	Votes	%
Whig	James Loch	Unopposed	
Registered electors		680	
Whig hold			

=== Elections in the 1840s ===
General election 1841: Wick Burghs
Party	Candidate	Votes	%	±%
Whig	James Loch	270	58.8	N/A
Conservative	George Dempster	189	41.2	New
Majority		81	17.6	N/A
Turnout		459	61.9	N/A
Registered electors		742		
Whig hold		Swing	N/A	

General election 1847: Wick Burghs
Party	Candidate	Votes	%	±%
Whig	James Loch	Unopposed		
Registered electors		690		
Whig hold				

=== Elections in the 1850s ===
General election 1852: Wick Burghs
Party	Candidate	Votes	%	±%
Radical	Samuel Laing	233	53.6	N/A
Whig	James Loch	202	46.4	N/A
Majority		31	7.2	N/A
Turnout		435	62.2	N/A
Registered electors		699		
Radical gain from Whig		Swing	N/A	

General election 1857: Wick Burghs
Party	Candidate	Votes	%	±%
Whig	John Hay	318	59.9	N/A
Whig	Alexander Nesbitt Shaw	213	40.1	N/A
Majority		105	19.8	N/A
Turnout		531	83.6	+21.4
Registered electors		635		
Whig gain from Radical		Swing	N/A	

General election 1859: Wick Burghs
Party	Candidate	Votes	%	±%
Liberal	Samuel Laing	Unopposed		
Registered electors		657		
Liberal hold				

=== Elections in the 1860s ===
Laing resigned after being appointed a member of the Council of India, causing a by-election.

By-election, 1 December 1860
Party	Candidate	Votes	%	±%
Liberal	William Keppel	Unopposed		
Liberal hold				

General election 1865: Wick Burghs
Party	Candidate	Votes	%	±%
Liberal	Samuel Laing	Unopposed		
Registered electors		793		
Liberal hold				

General election 1868: Wick Burghs
Party	Candidate	Votes	%	±%
Liberal	George Loch	851	57.3	N/A
Liberal	Samuel Laing	635	42.7	N/A
Majority		216	14.6	N/A
Turnout		1,486	88.8	N/A
Registered electors		1,673		
Liberal hold		Swing	N/A	

=== Elections in the 1870s ===
Loch resigned, causing a by-election.

By-election, 28 Feb 1872: Wick Burghs
Party	Candidate	Votes	%	±%
Liberal	John Pender	704	58.6	N/A
Independent Liberal	Robert Reid	498	41.4	New
Majority		206	17.2	+2.6
Turnout		1,202	83.5	−5.3
Registered electors		1,439		
Liberal hold		Swing		

General election 1874: Wick Burghs
Party	Candidate	Votes	%	±%
Liberal	John Pender	857	54.0	N/A
Liberal	James Bryce	730	46.0	N/A
Majority		127	8.0	−6.6
Turnout		1,587	88.5	−0.3
Registered electors		1,793		
Liberal hold		Swing	N/A	

=== Elections in the 1880s ===
General election 1880: Wick Burghs
Party	Candidate	Votes	%	±%
Liberal	John Pender	Unopposed		
Registered electors		1,754		
Liberal hold				

General election 1885: Wick Burghs
Party	Candidate	Votes	%	±%
Wick Radical Workingmen's Association	John Macdonald Cameron	913	51.3	New
Liberal	John Pender	868	48.7	N/A
Majority		45	2.6	N/A
Turnout		1,781	88.4	N/A
Registered electors		2,015		
Wick Radical Workingmen's Association gain from Liberal		Swing	N/A	

- Cameron was supported by the Highland Land League, and ally of the Crofter MPs.

General election 1886: Wick Burghs
Party	Candidate	Votes	%	±%
Liberal	John Macdonald Cameron	910	57.0	+8.3
Liberal Unionist	John Denison-Pender	686	43.0	New
Majority		224	14.0	N/A
Turnout		1,596	79.2	−9.2
Registered electors		2,015		
Liberal gain from Wick Radical Workingmen's Association		Swing	N/A	

=== Elections in the 1890s ===
General election 1892: Wick Burghs
Party	Candidate	Votes	%	±%
Liberal Unionist	John Pender	952	53.6	+10.6
Liberal	John Macdonald Cameron	825	46.4	−10.6
Majority		127	7.2	N/A
Turnout		1,777	80.5	+1.3
Registered electors		2,208		
Liberal Unionist gain from Liberal		Swing	+10.6	

General election 1895: Wick Burghs
Party	Candidate	Votes	%	±%
Liberal Unionist	John Pender	913	50.7	−2.9
Liberal	Thomas Hedderwick	889	49.3	+2.9
Majority		24	1.4	−5.8
Turnout		1,802	81.7	+1.2
Registered electors		2,205		
Liberal Unionist hold		Swing	-2.9	

Pender's resignation caused a by-election.

By-election, 2 Jun 1896: Wick Burghs
Party	Candidate	Votes	%	±%
Liberal	Thomas Hedderwick	1,054	55.6	+6.3
Liberal Unionist	William Charles Smith	842	44.4	−6.3
Majority		212	11.2	N/A
Turnout		1,896	83.3	+1.6
Registered electors		2,277		
Liberal gain from Liberal Unionist		Swing	+6.3	

=== Elections in the 1900s ===
General election 1900: Wick Burghs
Party	Candidate	Votes	%	±%
Conservative	Arthur Bignold	1,154	52.6	+1.9
Liberal	Thomas Hedderwick	1,041	47.4	−1.9
Majority		113	5.2	+3.8
Turnout		2,195	79.9	−1.8
Registered electors		2,746		
Conservative hold		Swing	+1.9	

General election 1906: Wick Burghs
Party	Candidate	Votes	%	±%
Conservative	Arthur Bignold	1,362	51.8	−0.8
Liberal	William Thomson	1,266	48.2	+0.8
Majority		96	3.6	−1.6
Turnout		2,628	91.0	+11.1
Registered electors		2,887		
Conservative hold		Swing	-0.8	

=== Elections in the 1910s ===
General election January 1910: Wick Burghs
Party	Candidate	Votes	%	±%
Liberal	Robert Munro	1,537	54.9	+6.7
Conservative	Arthur Bignold	1,262	45.1	−6.7
Majority		275	9.8	N/A
Turnout		2,799	92.7	+1.7
Liberal gain from Conservative		Swing	+6.7	

General election December 1910: Wick Burghs
Party	Candidate	Votes	%	±%
Liberal	Robert Munro	1,515	53.7	−1.2
Conservative	Arthur Bignold	1,304	46.3	+1.2
Majority		211	7.4	−2.4
Turnout		2,819	92.8	+0.1
Liberal hold		Swing	-1.2	

Munro

1913 Wick Burghs by-election
Party	Candidate	Votes	%	±%
Liberal	Robert Munro	1,577	58.2	+4.5
Unionist (Conservative)	A.G. Mackenzie	1,134	41.8	−4.5
Majority		443	16.4	+9.0
Turnout		2,711	87.6	−5.2
Liberal hold		Swing	+4.5	

== See also ==
- List of former Parliamentary constituencies in the United Kingdom

== Sources ==
- The House of Commons 1754-1790, by Sir Lewis Namier and John Brooke (HMSO 1964)
- British Parliamentary Election Results 1832-1885, compiled and edited by F. W. S. Craig (The Macmillan Press 1997)
- Chronology of British Parliamentary By-elections 1833-1987, compiled and edited by F. W. S. Craig (Parliamentary Research Services 1987)
- British Parliamentary Election Results 1885-1918, compiled and edited by F.W.S. Craig (Macmillan Press 1974)
- Boundaries of Parliamentary Constituencies 1885-1972, compiled and edited by F.W.S. Craig (Parliamentary Reference Publications 1972)
- Leigh Rayment's Historical List of MPs – Constituencies beginning with "W" (part 3)
- Debrett's House of Commons and Judicial Bench, 1889 (for 1885 and 1886 results)
- Whitaker's Almanack, 1907 (for 1906 results)
