= John Denison-Pender, 2nd Baron Pender =

John Jocelyn Denison-Pender, 2nd Baron Pender CBE (26 January 1907 – 21 March 1965) was a British civil servant and businessman.

He was educated at Magdalen College, Oxford, and later held the following positions:

- Deputy Chief General Manager Cable and Wireless, 1933.
- General Manager Cable and Wireless, 1935.
- President of The Royal Albert Hall, 1952–1965.
- Governor Cable & Wireless (Holdings), 1964.
- Vice-Chairman Board of Governors Charing Cross Hospital, London.
- Director, Direct Spanish Telegraph Company Ltd.
- Finance Director, Commercial Union Assurance, now known as Aviva.
- Joint Managing Director Cable and Wireless 1945–46, resigned on nationalisation of company. In 1946 the C&W board petitioned Select Committees of both *Commons and Lords against the nationalisation of the company.

In 1940 the Cable and Wireless 'Board of Management', working with the Post Office, introduced Expeditionary Force Messages (EFMs) which became the key communication for soldiers sending messages home and vice versa, sometimes totalling 20,000 messages a day. Denison-Pender ran C&W services during the war years and it was some feat that it remained undisrupted during that time, despite numerous setbacks including the Electra House HQ (London), Brentwood wireless station, the Moorgate-Porthcurno landlines and Porthcurno Telegraph Museum (Cornwall) all receiving direct hits in 1940 and up to 1945.

His paternal great-grandfather was Sir John Pender, the submarine communications cables pioneer who founded the Eastern Telegraph Company and other Worldwide Telegraph Companies, which became Cable & Wireless, and was the lead financier in the first successful laying of the Transatlantic Telegraph in 1866. In 1934, the new name Cable & Wireless (from Imperial and International Communications Limited) was designed to more clearly reflect the combined radio and cable services which it offered, without reference to the Empire. His great (half-)uncle Sir James Pender, 1st Baronet (from Sir John Pender's first marriage), was the first chairman of Eastman Kodak (UK). Eldest son of John Denison-Pender, 1st Baron Pender, and Irene De La Rue, married Camilla Lethbridge, daughter of Willoughby Pemberton

== Arms ==
Coat of arms of John Denison-Pender, 2nd Baron Pender
Crest 1st a demi-lion Or holding in the dexter paw a sea-axe Proper pommel and hilt Gold and resting the sinister paw on a terrestrial globe Proper, 2nd In front of a sun rising in splendour a dexter arm in bend Proper vested Gules gutte d’eau cuff Erminois the fore-finger pointing to an estoile Or. Escutcheon Quarterly: 1st & 4th Gules on a bend nebuly Argent two lions’ heads erased of the first (Pender), 2nd & 3rd per bend Sable and Argent two bendlets between a unicorn’s head erased in chief and three cross-crosslets in base all counterchanged (Denison). Supporters On either side a figure of Hermes standing on a cable-grapnel the dexter holding in the exterior hand a caduceus and the sinister a flash of lightning all Proper. Motto Persevero

Peerage of the United Kingdom
Preceded by John Denison-Pender	Baron Pender; 1949–1965	Succeeded by John Denison-Pender
