= John Macdonald Cameron =

Scottish chemist and politician (1847–1912)

John Macdonald Cameron (8 April 1847 – 3 September 1912) was a Scottish chemist and Liberal Party politician who sat in the House of Commons from 1885 to 1892.

Cameron was the only son of Lachlan Cameron of Saltburn Ross and his wife Christina Macdonald of Brackla, Nairnshire. He was educated at Sharp's Institution, Perth and entered the Inland Revenue in 1866. In 1870 he gained a Board of Inland Revenue scholarship in Science and studied at the Royal School of Mines winning 1st class prize in Organic and Inorganic Chemistry. He was a chemist in the Inland Revenue Laboratory at Somerset House from 1870 to 1874 and then became an instructor in the Chemical Research Laboratory at the Royal School of Mines. In 1879 he began in business as an assayer and mining expert. He contributed to a geological paper on a possible new mineral from Scotland in 1880. His reports on minerals include: from India, "Quartz outcrops of Travancore Lower India"; from Mexico, "The copper, silver-lead, and gold lodes of Huacaivo in the state of Chihuahua, republic of Mexico (1883)"; and, from Brazil, "The Bituminous Deposits of Camamu Basin, Bahia, Brazil".

At the 1885 general election, Cameron was elected as the Member of Parliament (MP) for Wick Burghs as an independent liberal, defeating the sitting Liberal MP John Pender. A committed land reformer, he had been nominated by the Wick Radical Workingmen's Association and supported by the Highland Law Reform Association and appears to have been sympathetic to the Crofters Party. He served as a Liberal Party MP and held the seat until his defeat at the 1892 general election by Pender, who was by then a Liberal Unionist.

It probably did not help Cameron's prospects of re-election that he spent much of his time far from home. In 1886 he had prepared a report on gold mines in Queensland. In 1891, 'the hon. Member [was] involved in an exploration scheme in Central Borneo, [and] penetrated further into that country than any white man has ever done before [to the] headwaters of the Great Mahakham River...[He] was very successful in his explorations. He started with three hundred men and came back with three...' or, as it was also described: 'going away to Borneo to perform some wonders to outstrip Rider Haggard's heroes'. After losing the election, Cameron was made deputy Master of the Mint in Sydney, but he resigned after some years to return to Borneo, prospecting for oil. He was successfully involved with establishing the oilfield on the island of Tarakan, north of his earlier exploits, but health concerns prompted him to return to Scotland, where he bought the estate of Balintraid. At the time of his death he held shares in both oil and timber concessions at Tarakan, some of which gave rise to court proceedings by his son, Edward Frankland Cameron.

Cameron's grandson, Sir Magnus Cameron Cormack, became President of the Australian Senate.

Parliament of the United Kingdom
Preceded by John Pender	Member of Parliament for Wick Burghs; 1885 – 1892	Succeeded by John Pender
