= 1872 Wick Burghs by-election =

UK Parliamentary by-election

The 1872 Wick Burghs by-election occurred on 28 February 1872. The by-election was contested due to the Resignation of the incumbent MP of the Liberal Party, George Loch. It was won by the Liberal candidate John Pender.
