= Leisure Hours =

Painting by John Everett Millais

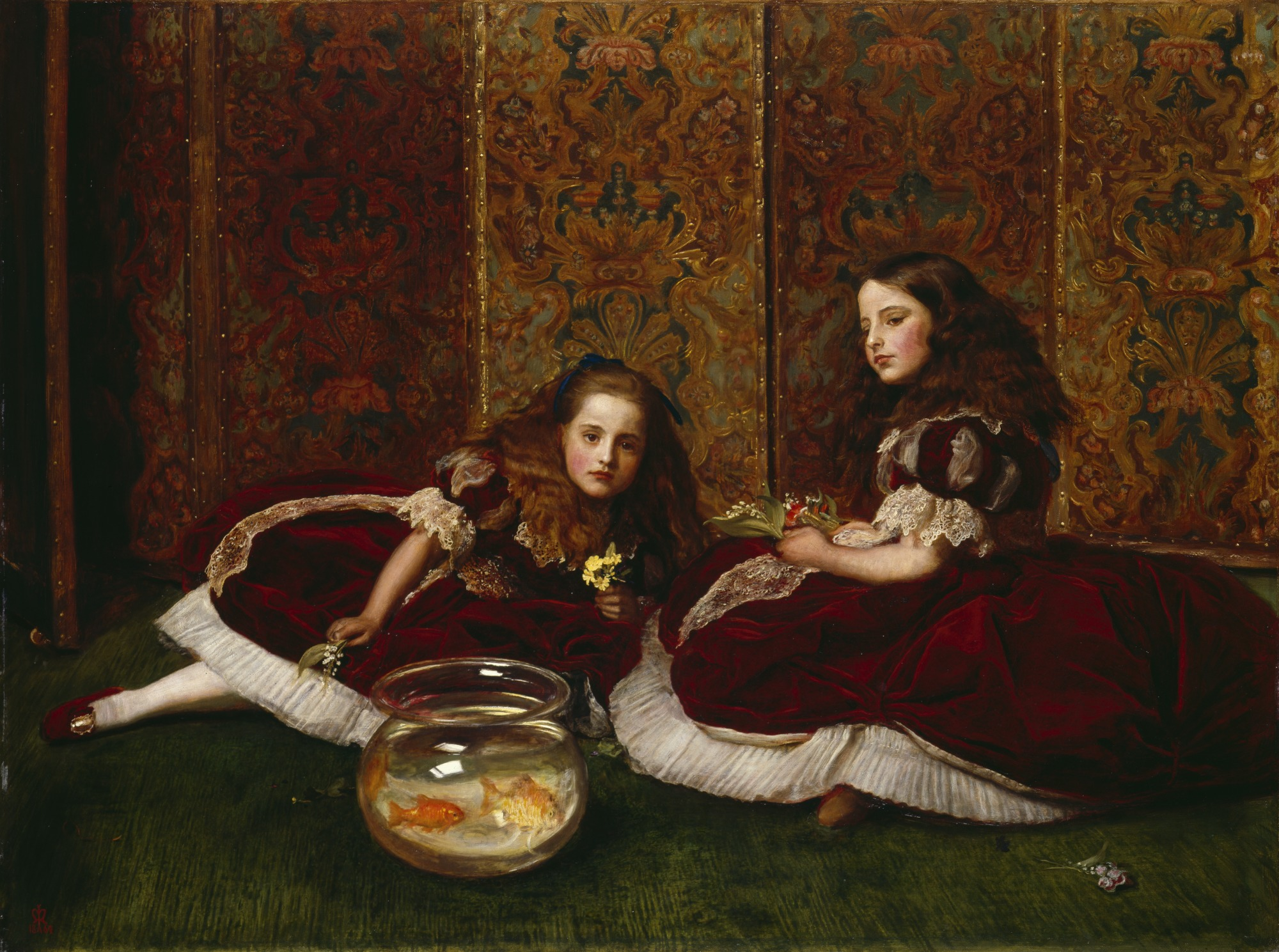
- Artist: John Everett Millais
- Year: 1864
- Type: Oil on canvas, portrait painting
- Dimensions: 88.9 cm × 118.1 cm (35.0 in × 46.5 in)
- Location: Detroit Institute of Arts, Michigan

Leisure Hours is an 1864 portrait painting by the British artist John Everett Millais. It depicts Anne and Marion, the daughters of the Glasgow textile magnate John Pender. They are shown in stylish Victorian dress with a goldfish bowl in front of them. Although not twins they are shown as nearly identical.

Millais had made his name at as member of the Pre-Raphaelite Brotherhood. Pender was a noted art collector who specifically commissioned the work from him at a time Millais was increasingly shifting to more rewarding academic art. The painting was displayed at the Royal Academy Exhibition of 1864 held at the National Gallery. Today it is part of the collection of the Detroit Institute of Arts in Michigan, which acquired it in 1978.

== See also ==
- List of paintings by John Everett Millais

== Bibliography ==
- Ash, Russell. Sir John Everett Millais. Pavilion, 1998.
- Barlow, Paul. Time Present and Time Past: The Art of John Everett Millais. Routledge, 2017.
- Georgieva, Margarita. Depictions of Children and the Adult's Journey in the Arts. Cambridge Scholars Publishing, 2017.
