= Francis Erskine Loch =

Royal Navy Admiral (1788–1868)

Admiral Francis Erskine Loch
- Born: April 1788
- Died: 13 February 1868 (aged 79); Cheltenham, England
- Military career
- Allegiance: Great Britain; United Kingdom
- Branch: Royal Navy
- Service years: 1799–1868
- Rank: Admiral
- Commands: HMS Rover; HMS Sparrow; HMS Minstrel; HMS Eden; HMS Hastings; HMS Victory; Stangate Creek quarantine site
- Conflicts: French Revolutionary Wars; Siege of Genoa; Egypt Campaign; Battle of Abukir; Battle of Mandora; Battle of Alexandria; Siege of Porto Ferrajo; Napoleonic Wars; British invasions of the River Plate; Battle of Montevideo; Peninsular War; Battle of Nivelle; Battle of Jobourg; Persian Gulf campaign of 1819

Admiral Francis Erskine Loch (April 1788 – 13 February 1868) was a Royal Navy officer who served in the French Revolutionary and Napoleonic Wars. He served as naval aide-de-camp to Queen Victoria.

== Life ==
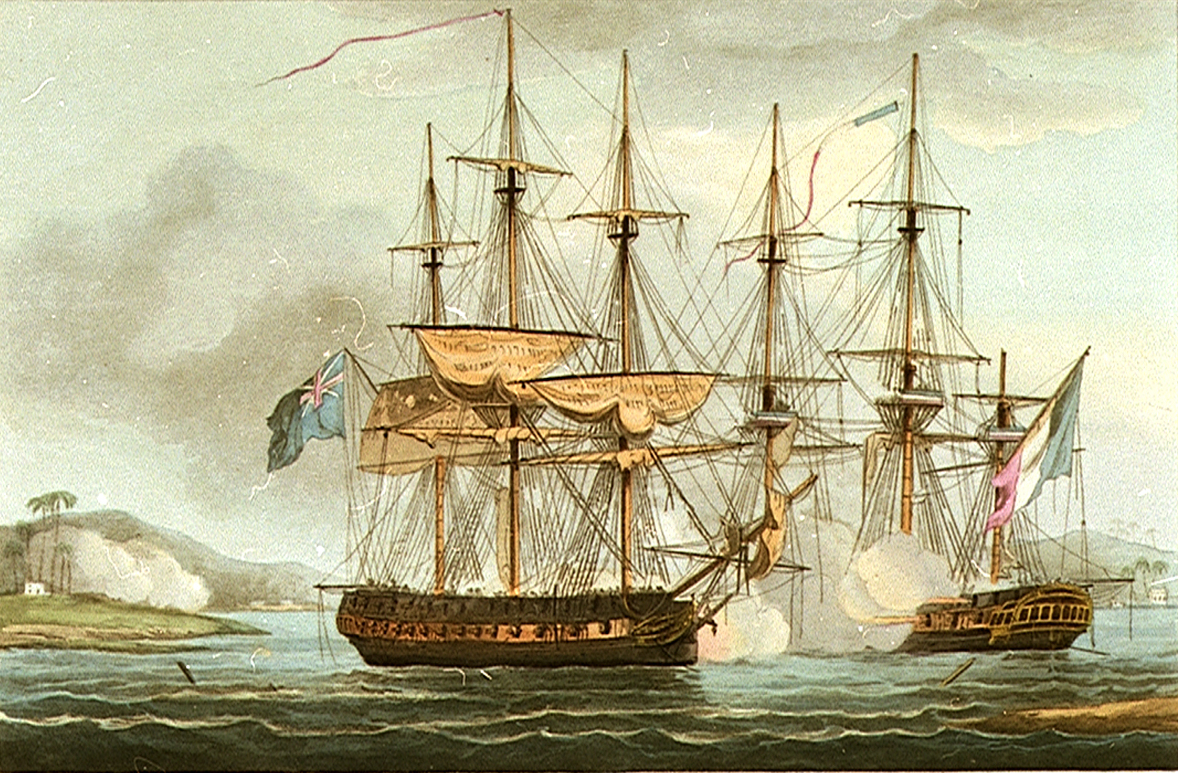
Chiffonne being captured by HMS Sybille

He was born in April 1788 in Drylaw House north of Edinburgh (now within the city boundary) the son of George Loch (1749–1788) and his wife Mary Adam, daughter of John Adam of the Adam family of architects.

He entered the Royal Navy on 1 September 1799 aged eleven as a cabin boy under Captain Andrew Todd on HMS Queen Charlotte in the Mediterranean with the fleet of Lord Keith. On 17 March 1800 Loch narrowly escaped death when the ship was destroyed by fire and blew up killing 673 men off the Italian coast near Leghorn. Loch was one of the few survivors. Loch served as a midshipman aboard HMS Audacious, HMS Foudroyant aad HMS Minotaur. He was present at the blockade of Genoa in May 1800 aboard Minotaur. Still with Lord Keith's fleet, he joined HMS Mondovi under Captain John Stewart. He was placed on the island of Rhodes overseeing the equipping of gunboats bound for Egypt and Lake Mareotis early in 1801. He took part in the landings at Aboukir Bay and was among the party that cut out a Greek vessel from under the guns of the castle overlooking the bay. He then joined HMS Africaine and then HMS Pearl until November 1801 before transferring back to Foudroyant. He returned home in 1802.

From May 1803 to 1805 he served under his cousin, Captain Adam on the captured French frigate Chiffonne in the North Sea and the English Channel. On Chiffonne he saw major action on 10 June 1805 when Chiffonne was among the Royal Navy vessels that drove two French corvettes and 15 gun-vessels ashore at Fecamp. The French warships had been escorting 14 transports. In December 1805, he transferred to HMS Resistance with Captain Charles Adam. In January 1806 he was promoted to lieutenant on HMS Diadem under Rear Admiral Charles Stirling. His most important action in this period was on HMS Queen Charlotte (the replacement ship to the earlier one of that name), at the blockade of Rio de la Plata. He stayed with Queen Charlotte until his promotion to captain.

His first command was on HMS Rover in 1812. He moved to HMS Minstrel in 1815, and HMS Eden in 1821. In the latter he served in the East Indies and Persian Gulf, acting as the senior officer for this zone. His last active service was from June to September 1839 on HMS Hastings in the Mediterranean.

He was invalided out of active service in the summer of 1839. From September 1839 to September 1841 he was commander of HMS Victory, while a guard-ship at Portsmouth. In 1847 he was made naval aide-de-camp to Queen Victoria (a prestigious but non-active role). Loch then underwent several promotions, but without command: rear admiral (1850); vice admiral (1857); admiral (1860).

He retired to Edinburgh in 1860, living at 22 George Square as neighbour to Reverend Patrick Clason. He died in Cheltenham on 13 February 1868.

== Family ==
Loch's had several important family connections: great grandfather- William Adam; great uncle – Robert Adam; uncle – William Adam of Blair Adam; cousin – Admiral Sir Charles Adam; nephew – Captain Granville Gower Loch RN

In 1822 he was married to Jesse Robertson in Edinburgh. Jesse was the daughter of Major Robertson, Barrack-Master-General of North Britain. Their known children were:

- George Francis Loch (1824–1848)
- Francis Adam Ellis Loch (1827–1891)
- Jane Garden Loch (1830–1891)
- Archibald Robertson Loch (1833–1906)
- James Henry Loch (1833–1918) his twin

Francis' children included Major General Granville George Loch (1870–1950)

== Memorabilia ==
His diary and sketch-books are held at the National Archive in Kew.
