= Thomas Hedderwick =

British politician

Thomas Charles Hunter Hedderwick
- Born: 1850
- Died: 6 February 1918 (aged 67–68)
- Occupation: Politician
- Years active: 1896-1900
- Title: Member of Parliament for Wick Burghs
- Term: 1896 – 1900
- Predecessor: John Pender
- Successor: Arthur Bignold
- Political party: Liberal Party
- Parent(s): James Hedderwick and Ellen Ness

Thomas Charles Hunter Hedderwick (6 April 1850 – 6 February 1918) was a Liberal Party politician in Scotland who served as the member of parliament (MP) for Wick Burghs from 1896 to 1900.

== Life ==
He was the second son of Robert Hedderwick (1806-1887) and Anna Mary Walker Hunter. Robert Hedderwick was Queen`s Printer and Publisher, Glasgow, founder and one of the proprietors of the Glasgow Citizen newspaper. Robert Hedderwick`s younger brother James Hedderwick (1814-1897) - who married Ellen Ness in 1846 - was a co-founder of the Glasgow Citizen.

Thomas C. H. Hedderwick was educated at Glasgow High School and Glasgow University, and then studied in Germany at Gottingen and Leipzig Universities. He was called to the Bar (Middle Temple) in 1876.

His first electoral contest was when he unsuccessfully fought South Lanarkshire at the 1892 general election.

In his time in Wick Burghs he had a number of fairly close contests with the Liberal Unionists. He fought the seat unsuccessfully at the 1895 general election, losing to John Pender 889 votes to 913. Following Pender`s resignation from Parliament, he won the seat at the by-election held in June 1896 (1054 to 842). But he was defeated at the 1900 general election. A petition was lodged relating to the 1900 election, but it was withdrawn.

In the January 1910 general election he stood as the parliamentary candidate for the Liberal Party in Newbury, but was not elected.

His sister Joanna McNeilage Hedderwick married John Lawson Walton at Glasgow Cathedral on 21 August 1882. In the 1881 census Thomas C. H. Hedderwick and John Lawson Walton had both been recorded as lodgers in the same Durham household, - with both as "Barrister at Law in Actual Practice".

Parliament of the United Kingdom
Preceded by John Pender	Member of Parliament for Wick Burghs; 1896 – 1900	Succeeded by Arthur Bignold
