= Prince Adolphus (1795 ship) =

History

Great Britain
- Name: Prince Adolphus
- Namesake: Prince Adolphus, Duke of Cambridge
- Builder: Falmouth
- Launched: 1795
- Captured: 1813

General characteristics
- Tons burthen: 180 (bm)
- Complement: 31 (at capture)
- Armament: 8 guns (at capture)

Prince Adolphus was launched in 1795, at Falmouth, Cornwall as a packet sailing for the Post Office Packet Service. She was involved in two notable incidents. In 1798, a French privateer captured her, but Prince Adolphus was ransomed in a transaction that required an amendment to a Bill before Parliament. In 1805, her crew mutinied in Falmouth before she set off on a cruise. The mutiny, subsequently joined by the crew of another packet, led the Post Office temporarily to move the packet service from Falmouth to Plymouth. An American privateer captured Prince Adolphus in 1812.

== Career ==
=== Capture ===
On 9 June 1798, a French privateer of 14 or 18 guns captured Prince Adolphus as she was sailing from Lisbon to Falmouth. The next report was that she had been purchased and had arrived back at Lisbon. The privateer was Tigre, of Morlaix. (Note: Tigre is probably a privateer of unknown homeport, of 55 men and 8 guns, that HMS Naiad captured on 11 August 1798. British records show that Tigre was under the command of Stephen Bonaventure Aggaret. She was armed with eight 4-pounder guns and eight swivels. She had a crew of 31 men, having put another 22 men aboard the prizes that she had taken in the eight days since she had left Groire.) Her captain took off the captain and crew, except for the steward, but let the passengers (General and Mrs. Pigot, 20 army officers, and ten others) remained after they gave him their word that they would not attempt to recapture Prince Adolphus. The privateer offered to ransom Prince Adolphus for £8000, but her captain refused. A prize crew of a prize master, four men, and six boys then took over the packet with orders to steer to the nearest Spanish port. After three days at sea, the passengers negotiated with the prize master who agreed that in return for $17,000, he would take Prince Adolphus to Lisbon. She arrived there on 23 June. Prince Adolphus, Captain Henry Fenner, arrived back at Falmouth on 24 September.

The story is a little more complex. The only officer of Prince Adolphus's crew that the privateer left aboard her was the surgeon, Mr. Bullock. It was he who negotiated with the prize master and promised that the Post Office would pay when she reached Lisbon. (The price he negotiated, $17,000, translated to about £4000, i.e., half the amount the privateer captain had proposed.) At Lisbon the agent for the packet service informed Bullock that Parliament had just passed a law declaring it high treason to remit money to any person owing obedience to the French government and that they would be subject to being hanged, drawn, and quartered if they paid the money. The agent contacted the Postmaster General, who consulted with various ministers. The decision was to pay the promised amount and that a clause would be inserted in a forthcoming Act of Parliament indemnifying all concerned in the transaction. The prize master was paid and he and his men left, full of praise for the honourable treatment they had received; the prize master wrote to the French Minister of Marine asking that Captain Boulderson be immediately released, which occurred.

Captain John Boulderson, Jr. was appointed on 24 August 1803, to command Prince Adolphus.

=== Mutiny ===
On 24 October 1810, Prince Adolphus and Duke of Marlborough were preparing to sail from Falmouth when the Tide-surveyor, of His Majesty's Customs, came on board with some men. The officials searched the crews' chests and confiscated the "little adventures" they found. The little adventures were items the crew had purchased for resale abroad to augment their salaries. Wages in the packet service had been stagnant for a number of years despite the price inflation that had developed during the Napoleonic Wars.

Earlier, on 15 August 1810, a deputation of two men from each packet had presented the Post Office agent with a petition for an increase in wages, pay parity throughout the service, and the restoration of private venturing. The Service had come to no decision by 24 August.

After the seizure of their ventures, the crews of both Prince Adolphus and Duke of Marlborough stopped work, and the departures were delayed. When the crews would not comply with the Saverland's (the packet agent) entreaties, he withdrew their protections from impressment. Captain Slade, of HMS Experiment came on board and pressed 26 men. Only 10 days earlier, Duke of Marlborough had fought off an attack by a privateer, at a cost of four men wounded; some time later the Post Master General awarded Duke of Marlborough's crew a bonus of four months pay and some "smart money". So in less than two weeks, the men had gone from being heroes to being pressed into the Royal Navy.

The crews of nine more packets deserted their vessels and took to the countryside to avoid being pressed. Of the 26 men who had been pressed, one was released, but the remaining 25 were put on HMS Mariner for carriage to the fleet in the Mediterranean. On the 25th, Duke of Marlborough sailed for Lisbon, with seamen from Experiment having replaced the impressed crew members. Experiment could not spare any more men to crew Prince Adolphus. Still, other naval vessels were given the task of carrying the mails.

Two men, not from the packet service and so not mutineers, carried the packetmen's message to London. There the authorities temporarily jailed them, temporarily because the Lord Mayor of London had exceeded his authority. Between 1 and 4 November, three packets returned to service, with Prince Adolphus sailing for Jamaica.

Still, Saveland was ordered on 2 November, to transfer the remaining packets to Plymouth. On 5 and 6 November, the Navy escorted eight packets remaining at Falmouth to Plymouth. However, Plymouth was completely occupied with supporting the Navy. The move to Plymouth was not successful, and between 13 and 15 February 1813, all thirteen packets at Plymouth returned to Falmouth. eventually things returned to normal.

== Fate ==
The American schooner privateer Governor McKean, Lucey, master, captured Prince Adolphus, Boulderston, master, on 9 August 1812, at 24°48′N 63°8′W. (Note: At the time that she captured Prince Adolphus, Governor M'Kean was armed with five guns and had a crew of 65 men under the command of Captain Alexander Lucet. (Note: On 26 January 1813, HMS Rover captured Governor M'Kean, of 112 ton (bm), one gun, and 16 men, which had been sailing from Philadelphia to Bordeaux with a cargo of cotton and bees' wax.)) Prince Adolphus was coming from Martinique, bound for Falmouth, with Demerara's governor, paymaster (or postmaster), and collector as passengers. (Note: The governor may have been the incumbent, Hugh Lyle Carmichael, but was more probably his predecessor, William Henry Betinck, returning to Britain.) She had left Demerara on 19 July. She arrived at Philadelphia on 28 August. United States' press accounts reported that Prince Adolphus was armed with eight guns and had a complement of 36 men.

Prince Adolphus's entry in the 1813 volume of LR carried the annotation "Captured".
