= James Anderson (sea captain) =

British captain of the SS Great Eastern

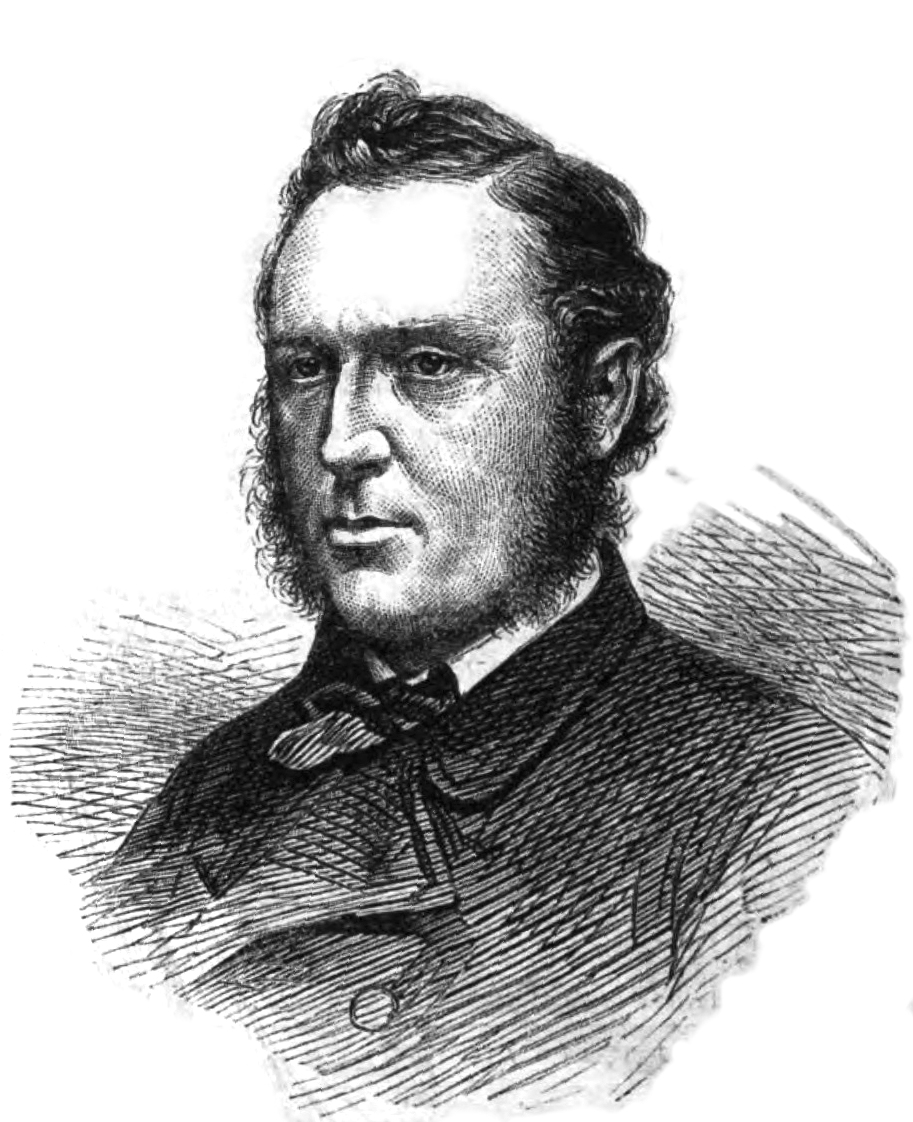
James Anderson, 1866 engraving (The Illustrated London News)

Sir James Anderson (4 June 1824 — 17 May 1893) captained SS Great Eastern on the laying of the Transatlantic telegraph cable in 1865 and 1866.

Anderson was born in Dumfries in south west Scotland and educated at the academy there.

Anderson captained Great Eastern, designed by Isambard Kingdom Brunel, on the transatlantic telegraph cable laying voyages of 1865 and 1866. In 1872 he was appointed as the first managing director of the Eastern Telegraph Company. This which became the largest submarine cable firm in the world.
