= Granville Gower Loch =

Granville Gower Loch (1813–1853) was a captain in the Royal Navy. A son of James Loch (his brother was Henry Loch, 1st Baron Loch, and his uncle was Admiral Francis Erskine Loch), Granville Gower Loch entered the navy in 1826 and had risen to the rank of commander by 1837. He attained post rank and went on the Obina campaign as a volunteer in 1841. He published an account of the campaign The Closing Events of the Campaign in China (1843). He was employed in Nicaragua in 1848, in the same year he was awarded the C.B. He took prominent part in the Second Burmese War, 1852–53. He was shot and killed while attacking a local uprising at Danubyu and was buried in Rangoon.

== Biography ==
Granville Gower Loch, born 28 February 1813, was second son of James Loch of Drylaw in Mid-Lothian; brother of George Loch and of Henry Loch, 1st Baron Loch. He entered the navy in February 1826, passed his examination in 1832, and was promoted to be lieutenant on 23 October 1833. After serving on the home station and the Mediterranean Loch was promoted to be commander 28 February 1837.

From 1838 to 1840 he commanded the sloop HMS Fly on the South American and Pacific station, and in 1841 the sloop HMS Vesuvius in the Mediterranean. He was advanced to post rank on 26 August 1841, and on returning to England went out to China as a volunteer, and at the capture of Chinkiang (Zhenjiang) served as an aide-de-camp to General Sir Hugh Gough. He afterwards published his journal under the title The Closing Events of the Campaign in China, 12mo, 1843.

From 1846 to 1849 Loch commanded the frigate HMS Alarm in the West Indies; and in February 1848 was sent to the coast of Nicaragua to demand and enforce redress for certain outrages, and to obtain the release of two British subjects who had been carried off from San Juan by the military commandant. The government at the time seemed to be in the hands of the army, and Loch forthwith proceeded up the river in the boats of the Alarm and sloop HMS Vixen, his total force being 260 men. The enemy had occupied a strong position at Serapaqui, defended not only by the nature of the ground and the material obstructions, but by a five-knot current which kept the boats under fire for an hour and a half before the men could land. The fort was then gallantly carried and dismantled, the guns destroyed and the ammunition thrown into the river. Thereupon the British demands were conceded and a satisfactory treaty was arranged. On the reception of the news in Britain Loch was made a Companion of the Bath (C.B.) 30 May 1848.

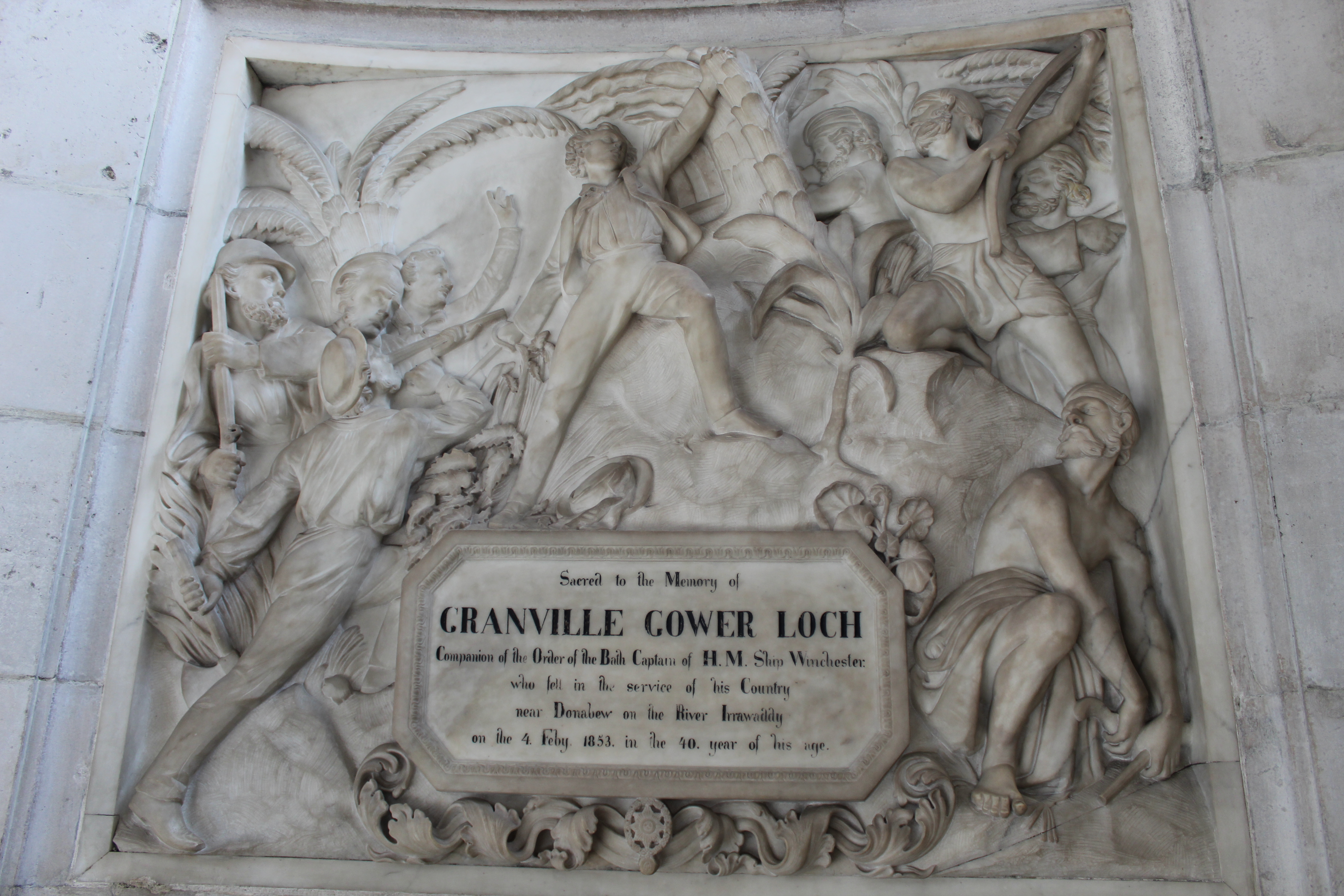
Memorial to Loch in St Paul's Cathedral by Carlo Marochetti

In 1852 Loch commissioned the frigate HMS Winchester to relieve HMS Hastings as flagship in China and the East Indies. It was the time of the Second Burmese War; and shortly after arriving at Rangoon the admiral died; the commodore was off the coast, and the command in the river devolved on Loch. The work resolved itself into keeping the river clear and driving the Burmese out of such positions as they occupied on its banks. In the beginning of 1853 a robber chief, Nga Myat Tun, Nya Myat Toon, or Myat-thoon, had brought together a strong force, had stockaded a formidable position at Donabew, stopped the traffic, and repelled the attempt to drive him away. Loch in person led a joint naval and military expedition against him; landed, and threaded the way by a narrow path through thick jungle. They found the stockade on the farther bank of a steep nullah, in attempting to cross which they suffered severely and were driven back on 4 February. Loch was shot through the body and died two days later, 6 February 1853. He was buried at Rangoon, beneath a stone erected by the officers and men of the Winchester. There is a memorial to him within St Paul's Cathedral by the sculptor Carlo Marochetti. He was unmarried.
