= Leopold Salomons =

British banker (1841-1915)

- Born: Leopold Solomons; 14 May 1841; Pentonville, London
- Died: 23 September 1915 (aged 74); Norbury Park, Surrey
- Occupation: City financier
- Spouses: Mary Elizabeth Thomas 1869–1879 (her death); Annie Martha Cooke 1882–1915 (his death)

Leopold Salomons (14 May 1841 – 23 September 1915) was a city financier and company director active in the City of London in the late 19th and early 20th centuries. Salomons was born into a British Jewish family, but it has been suggested that he later converted to Christianity. Today he is primarily remembered for his purchase of Box Hill in 1914 to protect it from development.

== Career in the City of London ==
Salomons was one of the founders and directors of the Employers' Liability Assurance Corporation Limited in 1880. He identified the potential market for employers' liability insurance which had arisen as a consequence of the Employers' Liability Act 1880. After Salomons' death in 1915, the then director of the Corporation commented, "[Salomons] was the founder of the Corporation and one of the original Directors, and through his great financial ability helped us to steer through many shoals which confronted us at the commencement of our career as a company." The company survives to this day (after multiple mergers and acquisitions) as part of the Aviva plc insurance group.

Together with city financiers Jabez Balfour and Sir John Pender, Salomons founded the investment underwriting firm the Trustees, Executors and Securities Insurance Corporation, Limited in December 1887.

== Purchase and gift of Box Hill ==
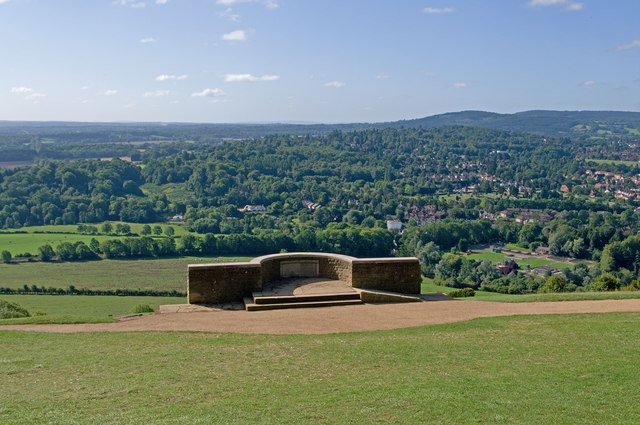
Salomons Memorial, Box Hill, Surrey (2010)

Salomons purchased Norbury Park near Mickleham in Surrey from the estate of Sir Thomas Grissell in 1890. In 1914, he purchased 230 acres of Box Hill to protect it from development, which he subsequently donated to the nation. A memorial to Salomons (commonly known as The Viewpoint) was constructed at the summit of the hill and was opened by his widow in 1920. Box Hill became the UK's first country park and is now owned and managed by the National Trust.

== Personal life ==
Salomons had a keen interest in shire horse breeding and served as a Governor of the Royal Agricultural Society.

Salomons funded the addition of a vestry to St Michael's Chapel in Westhumble.

Salomons was buried in the churchyard of St Michael's Church, Mickleham. His wife, Annie Martha Salomons (born in Geelong, Australia) was buried alongside him after her death on 27 November 1932.
