= James Loch =

Scottish estate commissioner, lawyer, member of parliament

- Born: May 7, 1780; Scotland
- Died: June 28, 1855; London
- Occupations: Barrister, estate commissioner, Member of Parliament for Cornwall and Scotland
- Term: Member of Parliament for Saint Germans, Cornwall 1827 - 1830; Member of Parliament for the Wick Burghs, Scotland 1830 - 1852
- Political party: Whig

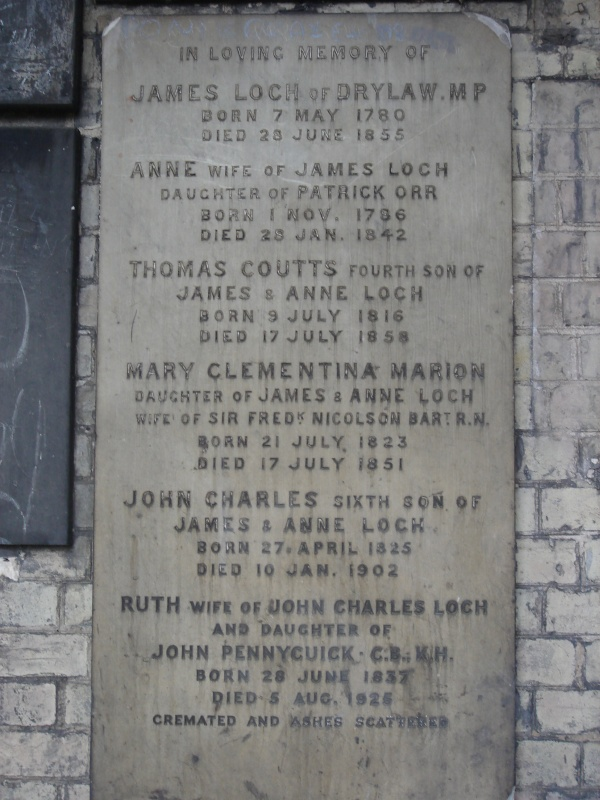
Funerary monument, Brompton Cemetery, London

James Loch (7 May 1780 – 28 June 1855) was a Scottish advocate, barrister, estate commissioner and later a member of parliament.

== Biography ==
Loch was born near Edinburgh on 7 May 1780. He was eldest son of George Loch of Drylaw, Edinburgh. His mother, Mary, was daughter of John Adam of Blair, Kinross-shire, and sister of Lord-commissioner Adam. After his father's death in 1788, he lived on the Blair Adam estate with his uncle. Loch's brother, William (1786–1824), was the great-great-grandfather of Tam Dalyell.

In 1801, Loch was admitted an advocate in Scotland, and was called to the bar in England at Lincoln's Inn on 15 November 1806, but abandoned the law after a few years of conveyancing practice.

He became interested in the management of estates, and was simultaneously auditor to the George, Marquis of Stafford (who married Elizabeth, Countess of Sutherland, and became shortly before he died Duke of Sutherland), to Lord Francis Egerton, afterwards Earl of Ellesmere, to the Bridgewater trustees, to the Earl of Carlisle, and to the trust estates of the Earl of Dudley and of George, Viscount Keith.

In this capacity he was responsible for much of the policy respecting the agricultural labourers and the improvement of agriculture pursued over tens of thousands of acres both in England and Scotland. The "Sutherlandshire clearances" of George, Marquis of Stafford, by which between 1811 and 1820 fifteen thousand tenants were removed from the inland to the seacoast districts, were carried out under his supervision.

For much of his life, Loch worked to effect the clearances and "to so mould and control the lives of 'the ignorant and credulous people' that at one time the young among them had to go to his agents for permission to marry". According to Loch's writings, "In a few years the character of the whole of this population will be completely changed... The children of those who are removed from the hills will lose all recollection of the habits and customs of their fathers".

The manner in which the evictions were carried out could be exceedingly harsh, particularly in the valley of Strathnaver. An eyewitness, Angus Mackay, commented that "It would be a very hard heart but would mourn to see the circumstances of the people... you would have pitied them, tumbling on the ground and greeting, tearing the ground with their hands...".

In June 1827 Loch entered parliament as member for St Germans in Cornwall for the Whigs, and having held that seat until 1830, he was then returned without opposition for the Wick Burghs, and was regularly re-elected until 1852, when he was defeated, by 119 votes to 80, by Samuel Laing.

Loch published a pamphlet on the improvements on the Sutherland estates in 1820, and in 1834 printed privately a memoir of the first Duke of Sutherland. He was a fellow of the Geological, Statistical, and Zoological Societies, and a member of the committee of the Useful Knowledge Society. He died on 28 June 1855, at his house in Albemarle Street, London, and was buried in Brompton Cemetery. There is a monument to him, now hidden in the woods, near Uppat Farm marking a spot where he apparently liked to come and view his achievements on the estate. It is a tall marble porch, paid for by the Sutherland family.

== Family ==
Loch married, first, in 1810, Ann, youngest daughter of Patrick Orr of Bridgeton, Kincardineshire, by whom, among several other children, he had sons, Granville Gower Loch and Henry Brougham Loch, who was a G.C.M.G. and G.C.B., governor of the Cape, and high commissioner for South Africa.

Loch married, secondly, on 2 December 1847, Elizabeth Mary, widow of Major George Macartney Greville, 38th Foot, and eldest daughter of John Pearson of Tettenhall Wood, Staffordshire, who predeceased him on 29 December 1848.

== Collections ==
University College London Special Collections holds an archive of correspondence to Loch and other family members. The correspondence primarily relates to early management of University College London and matters relating to the Society for the Diffusion of Useful Knowledge.

== Notes ==
Parliament of the United Kingdom
Preceded by Charles Ross; Charles Arbuthnot	Member of Parliament for St Germans; 1827–1830; With: Charles Ross	Succeeded by Charles Ross; Sir Henry Hardinge
Preceded by Sir Hugh Innes, Bt	Member of Parliament for Tain Burghs; 1830–1832	Constituency abolished
New constituency	Member of Parliament for Wick Burghs; 1832–1852	Succeeded by Samuel Laing
