= John Denison-Pender, 1st Baron Pender =

British politician

John Denison-Pender

Member of Parliament for Newmarket
- In office 1913–1918
- Preceded by: Sir Charles Day Rose
- Succeeded by: Constituency abolished

Member of Parliament for Balham & Tooting
- In office 1918–1922
- Preceded by: Constituency established
- Succeeded by: Sir Alfred Butt

Personal details
- Born: John Cuthbert Denison-Pender; 11 May 1882
- Died: 4 December 1949 (aged 67)
- Party: Conservative
- Spouse: Irene de la Rue (m. 1906; died 1943)
- Parents: Sir John Denison-Pender (father); Beatrice Katherine (mother)
- Education: Hazelwood School; Eton College

Military service
- Allegiance: United Kingdom
- Branch/service: British Army
- Rank: Honorary Colonel

John Cuthbert Denison-Pender, 1st Baron Pender (11 May 1882 – 4 December 1949) was a British Conservative politician. He retired from politics in 1922. In 1925 he was vice-chairman and joint managing director of Cable & Wireless and governor of Cable & Wireless Holdings 1929–1945. In the years 1925-1940 he was a director of P&O, British-India Steam Navigation Company, National Provincial Bank, Eastman Kodak and Northern Assurance.

Denison-Pender was the son of Sir John Denison-Pender and his wife Beatrice Katherine (née Ellison). His paternal grandfather was Sir John Pender, the submarine communications cables pioneer. His half-uncle Sir James Pender (from Sir John Pender's first marriage) was the first chairman of Eastman Kodak (UK). He was educated at Hazelwood School in Limpsfield, Surrey, until the spring of 1896 when he went to Eton College, leaving in 1899.

On leaving school he joined the Eastern Telegraph Company passing through several of their branches including cable laying. He was a member of the London County Council for South St Pancras between 1910 and 1919 and sat as Member of Parliament for Newmarket from 1913 to 1918 and for Balham and Tooting as a Coalition Conservative supporting the Coalition Government from 1918 to 1922.

On a few occasions he played for Balham Football Club, though as an "unregistered" player. Denison-Pender also served in France and Belgium in the First World War as an Army captain and A.D.C. to Major-General Hon W. Lambton (sixth son of the second Earl of Durham), who became G.O.C. in 1916 of the 4th Infantry Division at the Battle of the Somme. During these years and in his political career he was known as "Captain Jack". As an MP he was recalled to London in 1916, to help run the Government's legislative programme from the War Office. In 1934 he was appointed honorary colonel of the Territorial Army City of London Signals. In 1937 he was raised to the peerage as Baron Pender of Porthcurnow (Porthcurno) in the County of Cornwall.

Denison-Pender married Irene, daughter of Sir Ernest de la Rue K.C.V.O., in 1906. She died in 1943. Denison-Pender survived her by six years and died in December 1949, aged 67. He was succeeded in the barony by his son John Jocelyn Denison-Pender.

== Arms ==
Coat of arms of John Denison-Pender, 1st Baron Pender
Crest 1st a demi-lion Or holding in the dexter paw a sea-axe Proper pommel and hilt Gold and resting the sinister paw on a terrestrial globe Proper, 2nd in front of a sun rising in splendour a dexter arm in bend Proper vested Gules gutte d’eau cuff Erminois the fore-finger pointing to an estoile Or. Escutcheon Quarterly: 1st & 4th Gules on a bend nebuly Argent two lions' heads erased of the first (Pender), 2nd & 3rd per bend Sable and Argent two bendlets between a unicorn’s head erased in chief and three cross-crosslets in base all counterchanged (Denison). Supporters On either side a figure of Hermes standing on a cable-grapnel the dexter holding in the exterior hand a caduceus and the sinister a flash of lightning all Proper. Motto Persevero

== Notes ==
Parliament of the United Kingdom
Preceded by Sir Charles Day Rose	Member of Parliament for Newmarket; 1913 – 1918	Constituency abolished
New constituency	Member of Parliament for Balham & Tooting; 1918 – 1922	Succeeded by Sir Alfred Butt
Peerage of the United Kingdom
New creation	Baron Pender; 1937 – 1949	Succeeded by John Jocelyn Denison-Pender
