= HMS Rover (1808) =

Brig-sloop of the Royal Navy

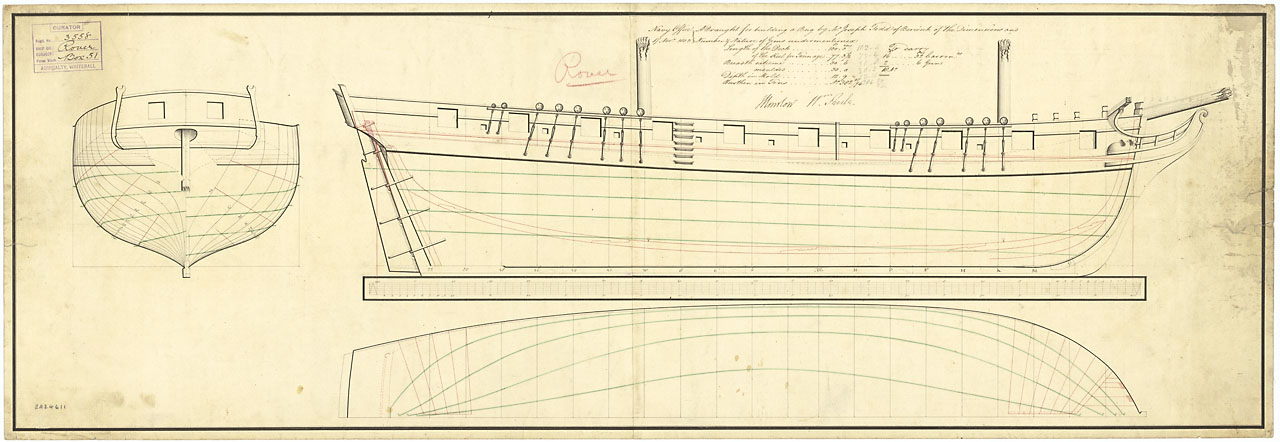
- Rover

History

United Kingdom
- Name: HMS Rover
- Ordered: 9 December 1803
- Builder: Joseph Todd, Berwick
- Laid down: June 1804
- Launched: 13 February 1808
- Fate: Sold 1828

United Kingdom
- Name: HMS Rover
- Acquired: 1828 by purchase
- Fate: Last listed in 1848

General characteristics
- Class & type: 18-gun Cruizer-class brig-sloop
- Tons burthen: 38485/94, or 406 bm
- Length: 100 ft 4 in (30.6 m) (overall); 77 ft 4 3/8 in (23.6 m) (keel)
- Beam: 30 ft 7 in (9.3 m)
- Depth of hold: 12 ft 9 in (3.9 m)
- Sail plan: Brig
- Complement: 110
- Armament: 16 × 32-pounder carronades; 2 × 6-pounder bow guns

HMS Rover was a Royal Navy Cruizer-class brig-sloop laid down in 1804 but not launched until 1808. She served in the North Sea, off the north coast of Spain, in the Channel, and on the North American station. She captured two letters-of-marque and numerous merchant vessels before being laid-up in 1815. She then sat unused until she was sold in 1828. She became a whaler that made four voyages to the British southern whale fishery between 1830 and 1848. She was last listed in 1848.

== Career ==
Rover was commissioned at Leith in May 1808 under Commander Francis Nott. On 8 September she recaptured the ship Ceres. A Dutch privateer had captured Ceres, of Burnt Island; Rover sent Ceres into Leith.

Between 16 and 26 April 1809, Rover captured four Danish sloops and their cargoes: Einigkeit, Fier Broders, Die Hoffnung, and Delphinen. During this period, on 19 April, Rover was in company with Nymphen when they captured the Anna Margaretta. That same day the Rover and Nymphen recaptured the Frau Anna. (Note: Another notice has Rover recapturing the Frau Anna on 26 April and makes no mention of Nymphen; whether the two notices represent a confusion of dates or separate events is an open question.) On 24 and 25 April, a Danish sloop and a galliot, both prizes to Rover, arrived at Leith. Then on the 28th, six more Danish prizes arrived at Leith; these were prizes to Rover and several other Navy vessels. On 8 May the Dolphin, also a prize to Rover, arrived at Leith.

At some point in 1809, Rover captured (or recaptured) the Ecce Homo, Eliza, Brothers, Pomona, and Ann. A more interesting event involving the colourful and erratic adventurer Jørgen Jørgensen occurred in June 1809.

After the British attack on Copenhagen in 1807 and the outbreak of the Gunboat War between Britain and the Dano-Norwegian kingdom, he took a small Danish vessel, the Admiral Juul, and in the action of 2 March 1808 engaged HMS Sappho; the British captured the Admiral Juul and treated Jørgensen as a privateer. In 1809, while in England on parole, he suggested to a merchant that a voyage to Iceland could be profitable as the island was suffering from food shortages at the time, due to the Danish monopoly on Icelandic trade. Jørgensen accompanied the voyage of the Clarence as an interpreter. That voyage failed to trade any goods as the ship was British and Denmark had forbidden trade with Britain. Shortly thereafter, Rover arrived at Reykjavík. The Board of Admiralty had sent it to prepare the way for a second British merchant voyage.

When Rover arrived, Nott found that the Danish Governor, Count of Trampe, who had arrived only shortly before and had his own cargo to sell, would still not permit trading. Nott threatened to fire on Reykjavík and Trampe agreed to a convention permitting British vessels to trade with Iceland unmolested. However, Trampe did not publish the convention, and as soon as Nott and Rover had left, rescinded it. (Note: For a full history of the entire affair see the account of Samuel Phelps, the merchant who had financed the two British merchant expeditions and who had accompanied the second.)

Soon after, Jørgensen sailed on a second voyage in the letter of marque Margaret and Anne, accompanied by the brig Flora. On arrival in Iceland they found that Trampe would still not permit trade. With the help of other crew members, Jørgensen arrested Trampe and proclaimed himself 'Protector', promising that he would reinstate the Althing as soon as the Icelandic people were able to govern themselves. His intent was to establish a liberal society in the spirit of those emerging in the Americas and Europe at the time; in practice he "imbibed all the quixotism of a petit Napoleon". On 14 August HMS Talbot arrived at Reykjavík. Commander the Honourable Alexander Jones, Talbot's captain, restored the Danish government, reinstated the convention that Nott and Trampe had agreed (this time Trampe honoured it), and arrested Jørgensen. When Talbot and Jørgensen arrived back in London, the Transport Board tried him and found him guilty of breaking his parole while a prisoner-of-war. He was released in 1811.

By 7 July Rover was already at Barö Sound, Finland. In September Rover was under the command of Alexander McVicar. Between 1 and 12 September she captured the Fast Haabet, Gode Hensight, Piscosus, Haabet's Anker, galiot Haabet 34, ketch Haabet 33, Anna Catherina, Transport (or sloop) No. 7, and Maria Cecilia. In September, Lloyd's List reported that Rover had captured five or six Danish vessels, with one, the Aurora, of and from Christianstadt, arriving in Leith on the 16th, and another two days later. A Haabet arrived at Leith on the 23rd. A Danish sloop arrived on 2 October.

On 19 July 1810, a foreign Greenland ship with "8 Fish" that Rover had detained, arrived at Leith. A week later, Rover captured the Marine Margaretta. In November Commander Justice Finley took command of Rover. In August Rover detained and sent into Leith the Hamburg ship Rosenboom, which was coming from Greenland. However, the authorities released Rosenboom and she sailed for Hamburg.

In March 1811 Rover accompanied the squadron under Admiral Joseph Sidney Yorke which was sailing to the Tagus carrying reinforcements for Arthur Wellesley's army, fighting in the Peninsular War. On the 22nd, Rover was off Finisterre when she discovered the schooner Mary, which had been sailing from Gibraltar to Liverpool, and which was now adrift and without a crew. Rover put an officer and some crew aboard Mary and sent her into Portsmouth. A later report was that a French squadron had captured Mary, Donaldson, master, which had been sailing from Alicant to Bristol, but had left her adrift. This second report had Rover sending Mary into Dingle.

Towards the end of the year, on 30 November, Rover captured the letter-of-marque Comte Regnaud, the former HMS Vincejo, which the French had captured six years earlier. Comte Regnaud was armed with ten 18-pounder carronades and four 9-pounder guns. She was under the command of M. Abraham Giscard and had left Batavia on 7 August 1811 with a cargo of spices, sugar, and coffee, the greater part of which belonged to the French government, and which she was taking to Rochelle. Although Finley described her as "well found in every Respect, and sails remarkably well", the Royal Navy did not take her back into service.

When news of the outbreak of the War of 1812 reached Britain, the Royal Navy seized all American vessels then in British ports. Rover was among the 42 Royal Navy vessels then lying at Spithead or Portsmouth and so entitled to share in the grant for the American ships Belleville, Janus, Aeos, Ganges and Leonidas seized there on 31 July 1812. (Note: A first-class share was worth £20 19s 0d; a sixth-class share, that of an ordinary seaman, was worth 4s 1d; the Commander in Chief received £230 10s 8d.)

Rover's stay at Portsmouth appears to have taken place between two spells on the Spanish north or Basque coast. First, she was at the attack on Santoña on 15 June 1812. Second, she was at the fall of Santander and the attack on Guteria on 18 August. (Note: Although O'Byrne refers to the fall of San Sebastián, he almost certainly confused this with the fall of Santander. The Duke of Wellington captured San Sebastián about a year later, in July–August 1813. However, Santander fell on 3 August 1812. These attacks on Spanish coastal towns involved the Royal Marines's 1st Battalion.) Rover also destroyed shore batteries during this period.

Lord Keith appointed Lieutenant Francis Erskine Loch (acting) commander of Rover in October 1812 and ordered him to patrol between Ushant and Île de Batz. (Note: For more on Lieutenant Francis Erskine Loch see: O'Byrne (1849c), pp. 667–669) There Loch forced an armed French convoy to seek refuge among the rocks.

Loch and Rover captured the American letter-of-marque schooner Experiment on 21 October off the Cordoban Light after a nine-hour chase. Experiment, of 131 tons (bm), was armed with six 9-pounder guns but had a crew of only 16 men under the command of Captain Philip Rider. Experiment was 31 days out of Charlestown on her way to Bordeaux with a cargo of cotton and rice. She had not made any captures on her voyage. (Note: A first-class share of the prize money was worth £17 9s 11d; a sixth-class share was worth 5s 1¼d.)

On 30 November, Rover captured the American brig Empress, of 275 tons (bm), and 12 men, which had been sailing from New York to Bordeaux with a cargo of cotton, coffee, and sugar. Beagle was in company with Rover. Rover sent the Empress, Moran, master, into Plymouth.

In the new year, the Admiralty promoted Lieutenant Loch to commander on 6 January 1813. When he left Rover, though he had only been her captain for a short time, the officers and men presented him with a sword. The following August Loch moved to Sparrow.

On 18 January 1813 Rover was in company with Andromache and Rota while Andromache was resupplying Rota, about 150 miles south west of the Cordovan light. The three vessels saw two strange sails in the distance and immediately set off in to investigate. Coming closer, they determined that the two were the British frigate Iris in pursuit of a merchantman. During the night Iris captured the merchantman, which turned out to be the American letter-of-marque ship Union, M. Olmstead, master, which had been sailing from Philadelphia to Bordeaux with a valuable cargo of cotton. (Note: Earlier, when Union, of 379 tons (bm), was operating as a privateer under Olmstead, she had had 12 guns and a crew of 53 men.) Iris claimed that she was the sole captor; Andromache, Rota, and Rover claimed that they were entitled to share the prize money as joint captors. The case went to court and the High Court of Admiralty ruled against Iris. The case established that "Ships seen to be in chase during the day, and continuing the pursuit in the proper direction after night comes on, are entitled to share as joint captors, although they are prevented from seeing the act of capture by the darkness of the night." The prize money notice appeared in May 1814. Though the report of the court case names Finley as commanding Rover at the time of the incident, the statement of the prize money amounts names Loch as commander. (Note: A first-class share of the prize money was worth £640 182 0d; a sixth-class share was worth £7 1s 4d.)

On 26 January 1813 Rover captured the American schooner Governor M'Kean, of 112 ton (bm), one gun, and 16 men, which had been sailing from Philadelphia to Bordeaux with a cargo of cotton and bees' wax. Rover sent Governor M'Kean into Plymouth, where she arrived that same day. Earlier, operating as a 5-gun privateer with a crew of 65 men under the command of Captain Lucet, Governor M'Kean had captured two ships and a brig. One of her prey had been the packet Prince Adolphus, under the command of Captain Boulderson, of eight guns and 36 men, which had been carrying the Lieutenant Governor of Demerara. (Note: This may have been the incumbent, Hugh Lyle Carmichael, but was more probably his predecessor, William Henry Betinck, returning to Britain.) Governor M'Kean had captured Prince Adolphus on 9 August 1812 and sent her into Philadelphia on 24 August.

Rover was in company with Belle Poule when they captured the American schooner Meteor, of 132 tons and 14 men, R. Bartlett, master, on 13 March 1813. Meteor was sailing from Nantes to New York with a cargo of brandy, wine, and silks. Briton was apparently also in company. Four days later, Rover captured the American schooner Independence, of 149 tons and 9 men which was sailing from La Rochelle to New York with a cargo of brandy. Rover sent both into Plymouth.

On 13 and 15 April Superb captured the Viper and the Magdalene. By this time Finley was again in command of Rover. (Note: A first-class share of the prize money was worth £1310 9s 10d; a sixth-class share, that of an ordinary seaman, was worth £10 9s 0d.) Magdalene arrived in Portsmouth two days later. Rover shared the proceeds of the capture with Superb and Pyramus, and the hired armed cutter Fancy, which were in sight. Magdalene was armed with two guns and had a crew of 20 men. She was sailing from the Vilaine to New York with a cargo of brandy and vinegar. Rover then sailed to Bermuda.

Wasp and Rover were in company on 16 June when they captured the brig Christiana, of 132 tons (bm). She was in the possession of the American privateer Teaser. (Note: Actually, the privateer was the Young Teazer. The Royal Navy had destroyed the privateer Teazer in late 1812. Wasp would sail on in pursuit of Young Teazer, chasing and then losing her.) The two British vessels also captured the schooner Lark.

On 7 June 1814 Commander James Pickard was appointed to replace Finley in command of Rover, but he was too unwell to take up the appointment. Instead Commander Henry Montressor took up the position Rover skirmished with American forces on the Potomac, and participated in the unsuccessful British attack on Baltimore between 12 and 15 September 1814.

In September Commander William Henry Bruce assumed command. He had been captain of Manly on the North America station and he sailed Rover back to Britain with dispatches. Thereafter, under his command Rover protected convoys and cruised for a year. In 1815 Rover accompanied Rear-Admiral George Burlton in Cornwallis, escorting the outward-bound East India trade. Rover went south of the equator, touching Maranham, Brazil, before returning to Britain with a convoy of merchant vessels from Barbados.

Rover patrolled off Dieppe in order to prevent Napoleon Bonaparte's escape after the battle of Waterloo. She was carrying dispatches from Admiral Lord Keith to Admiral Henry Hotham when she encountered Bellerophon with the by then captured Napoleon on board.

=== Disposal ===
The navy laid Rover up in September 1815 and paid her off the next month. She then sat until 26 March 1828. The "Principal Officers and Commissioners of His Majesty's Navy" offered "Rover, 18 guns and 385 tons", "Lying at Plymouth" for sale on that day. The navy sold her to a Mr. Adam Gordon for £980.

=== Post script ===
In January 1819, the London Gazette reported that Parliament had voted a grant to all those who had served under the command of Lord Viscount Keith at various times between 1812 and 1814. Rover was listed among the vessels that had served under Keith in 1813 and 1814. (Note: The money was paid in three tranches. For someone participating in the first through third tranches, a first-class share was worth £256 5s 9d; a sixth-class share was worth £4 6s 10d. For someone participating only in the second and third tranches a first-class share was worth £202 6s 8d; a sixth-class share was worth £5 0s 5d.)

== Whaler ==
Rover first entered Lloyd's Register (LR) in the volume for 1830. The entry gave her burthen as 406 tons, her launch year as 1808, and her place of launch as Plymouth. However, the entry in the Register of Shipping for 1831 agreed in all particulars with that in Lloyd's Register, except that the Register of Shipping gave the launch place as Berwick.

Year	Master	Owner	Trade	Source & notes
1830	Chambers	Hill & Co.	London–South Seas	LR; large repair 1830

1st whaling voyage (1830–1834): Captain Chambers sailed on 28 December 1830, bound for the Indian Ocean. Rover was reported to be whaling at Morotai and New Guinea. She returned on 5 January 1834 with 150 tons of oil.

2nd whaling voyage (1834–1838): Captain John Rains sailed on 26 August 1834, bound for the Pacific. Rover was reported at Tahiti, Japanese waters, and Hawaii. She returned to England on 24 May 1838 with 201 tons of oil.

3rd whaling voyage (1839–1843): Captain John Blythe sailed from London on 21 September 1839, bound for Timor. Rover returned on 28 July 1839 with 440 casks of oil.

Year	Master	Owner	Trade	Source & notes
1843	Rains; J.Blythe	Hill & Co. Boulcott & Co.	London–South Seas	LR; large repair 1830, repairs 1834, & damages repaired 1838

4th whaling voyage (1844–1848): Captain Blythe sailed from London on 22 February 1844, bound for Timor. She returned on 23 October 1848 with 275 casks.

== Fate ==
Rover was last listed in Lloyd's Register in 1848.
