= Samuel Laing (science writer) =

British railway administrator, politician and writer

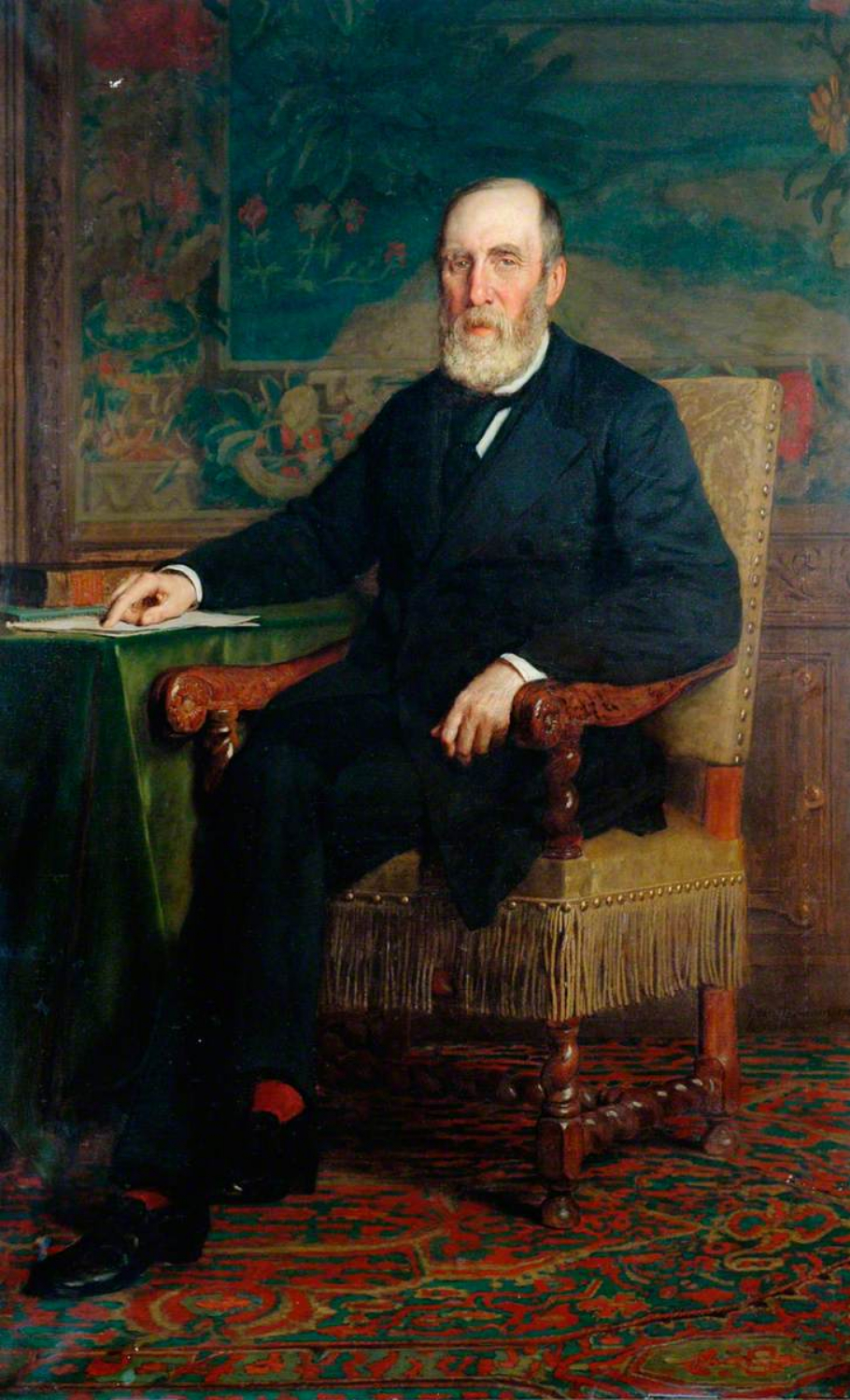
- Portrait of Samuel Laing by Pieter Van Havermaet, 1872

Member of Parliament for Orkney and Shetland
- In office 1873–1885
- Preceded by: Frederick Dundas
- Succeeded by: Leonard Lyell

Member of Parliament for Wick Burghs
- In office 1865–1868
- Preceded by: Viscount Bury
- Succeeded by: George Loch
- In office 1859–1860
- Preceded by: Lord John Hay
- Succeeded by: Viscount Bury
- In office 1852–1857
- Preceded by: James Loch
- Succeeded by: Lord John Hay

Personal details
- Born: 12 December 1812 Edinburgh, Scotland
- Died: 6 August 1897 (aged 84) Sydenham, England
- Parent: Samuel Laing (father)
- Relatives: Malcolm Laing (uncle)
- Education: St John's College, Cambridge
- Occupation: Railway administrator, politician, writer
- Awards: Smith's Prize (1832)

Samuel Laing (12 December 1812 – 6 August 1897) was a British railway administrator, politician, and writer on science and religion during the Victorian era.

== Early life ==
Samuel Laing was born on 12 December 1812 in Edinburgh. His father, also called Samuel Laing (1780–1868), was a well-known author, whose books on Norway and Sweden attracted much attention. Laing the Younger's uncle was historian Malcolm Laing. Laing the Younger entered St John's College, Cambridge in 1827, and after graduating as Second Wrangler and Smith's Prizeman, was elected a fellow. He remained at Cambridge temporarily as a mathematics coach, before being called to the bar in 1837.

== Career ==
He became private secretary to Henry Labouchere, later 1st Baron Taunton, who was then the President of the Board of Trade. In 1842, he was made secretary to the railway department, and retained this post until 1847. He had by then become an authority on railways, and had been a member of the Dalhousie Railway Commission; it was at his suggestion that the "parliamentary" rate of a penny a mile was instituted. In 1848, he was appointed chairman and managing director of the London, Brighton and South Coast Railway (LB&SCR), and his business acumen showed itself in the largely increased prosperity of the line. He also became chairman (1852) of The Crystal Palace Company, but retired from both posts in 1855.

In 1852, he was elected to Parliament as a Liberal Party candidate in Wick Burghs. After losing his seat in 1857, he was re-elected in 1859, and appointed Financial Secretary to the Treasury; in 1860 he was made finance minister in India. On returning from India, he was re-elected to parliament for Wick in 1865. He was defeated in 1868, but in 1873 he was returned for Orkney and Shetland, and retained his seat until 1885. Early in 1867 he was elected to the board of the Great Eastern Railway who by that point were sliding towards receivership. On 1 July, the day before the GER went into receivership, he was reappointed chairman of the Brighton line, which was now on the point of bankruptcy following the over-ambitious expansion plans of the previous chairman. He continued in that post until 1896, and gradually restored the company to financial health. He was also chairman of the Railway Debenture Trust and the Railway Share Trust.

=== Science writer ===
In later life, he became well known as an author, his Modern Science and Modern Thought (1885), Problems of the Future (1889) and Human Origins (1892) being widely read, not only by reason of the writer's influential position, experience of affairs and clear style, but also through their popular and at the same time well-informed treatment of the scientific problems of the day. Laing's attitude was generally positive towards new developments in science, and he offered an optimistic vision of progressive modernity. He also wrote on religion. His book A Modern Zoroastrian argued that the ancient religion of Zoroastrianism was more consistent with modern scientific thought than was traditional Christianity. He argued that the "all pervading principle of polarity" that was central Zoroastrian thought has been confirmed by science, and that modern Christianity should abandon its traditional theology to centre on the figure of Jesus as an ideal of humanity.

== Personal life ==
Laing married Mary Dickson (née Cowan) (1819–1902). Together, they were the parents of eleven children:

- Samuel Laing (1843–1870), who died young.
- Malcolm Alfred Laing (1846–1917)
- Robert Laing (b. 1848)
- Cecilia Mary Bruce Laing (1848–1942)
- Mary Eliza Laing (1850–1936)

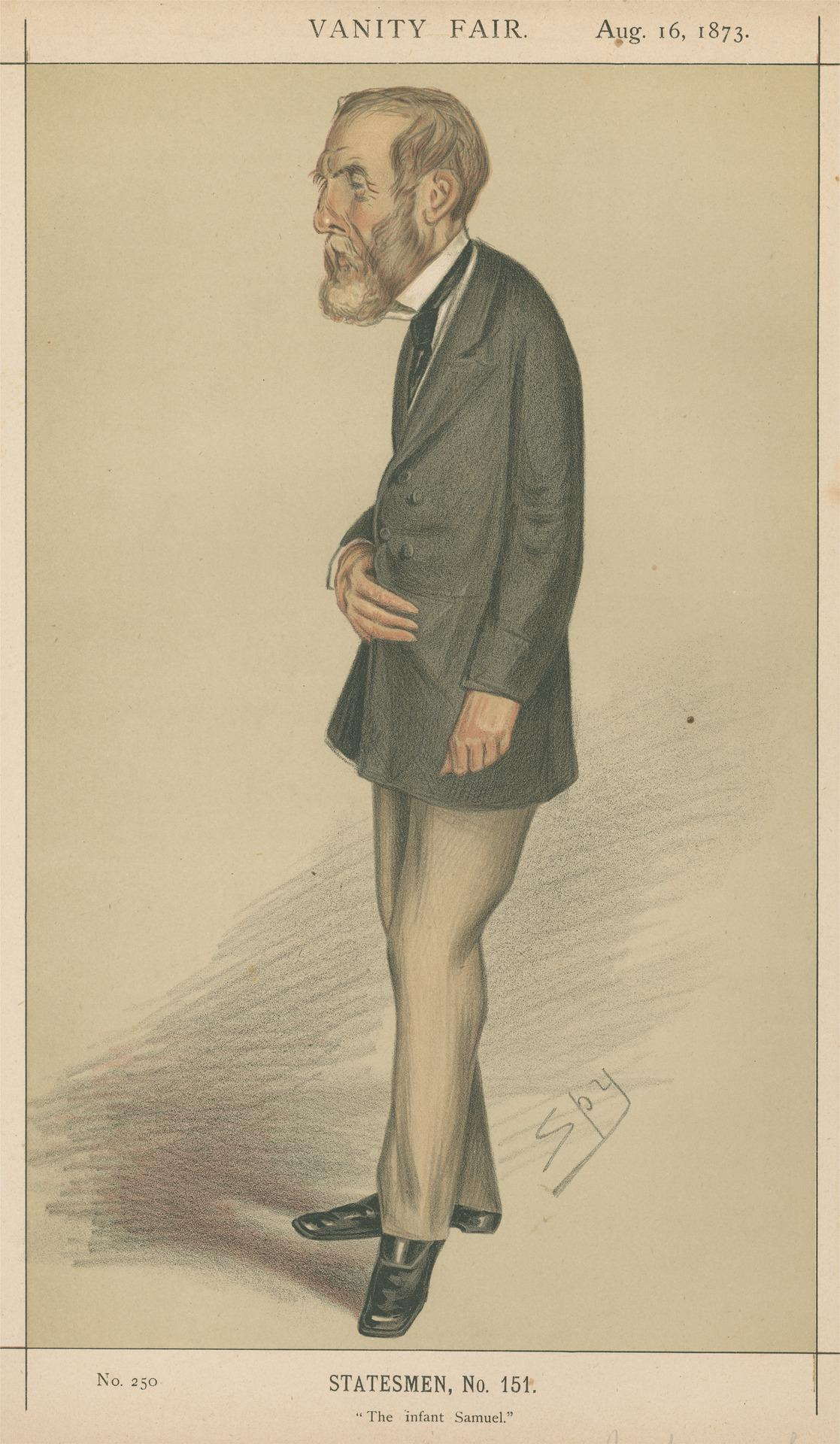
The infant Samuel Laing as caricatured by Spy (Leslie Ward) in Vanity Fair, August 1873

- Agnes Laing (1851–1933)
- Florence Elizabeth Laing (1853–1952), an artist who married Edward Sherard Kennedy, an illegitimate son of Robert Sherard, 6th Earl of Harborough. After his death in 1900, she married on 27 December 1902 Joannes Gennadius (1844–1932), later Greek Ambassador to England with whom she established the Gennadius Library at the American School of Classical Studies at Athens (ASCSA).
- Francis Kelly Lang (1854–1874)
- Theresa Uzielli Laing (1857–1943)
- Henry Rudolph Laing (1858–1941)
- Robert Laing (1859–1860), who died young.

Laing was often claimed to have been the father of the novelist Mary Eliza Kennard (1850–1936). This issue is still in dispute. However birth entries at the General Register Office for her sons Lionel Edward Kennard and Malcolm Alfred Kennard both have Laing as the mother's maiden name. Furthermore, the transcribed parish record entry for her marriage to Edward Kennard on 19 April 1870 at Saint Nicholas church, Brighton gives her name as Mary Eliza Laing, daughter of Samuel Laing.

Laing died on 6 August 1897 at his home in Sydenham, England and was buried in the Brighton Extramural Cemetery.

Parliament of the United Kingdom
Preceded by James Loch	Member of Parliament for Wick Burghs; 1852–1857	Succeeded by Lord John Hay
Preceded by Lord John Hay	Member of Parliament for Wick Burghs; 1859–1860	Succeeded by Viscount Bury
Preceded by Viscount Bury	Member of Parliament for Wick Burghs; 1865–1868	Succeeded by George Loch
Preceded by Frederick Dundas	Member of Parliament for Orkney and Shetland; 1873–1885	Succeeded by Leonard Lyell
Political offices
Preceded by Sir Stafford Northcote	Financial Secretary to the Treasury; 1859–1860	Succeeded by Frederick Peel
Business positions
Preceded by Charles Pascoe Grenfell	Chairman of the Board of Directors of the London, Brighton and South Coast Railway; 1848–1855	Succeeded by Leo Schuster
Preceded by Col. Walter Barttelot, MP	Chairman of the Board of Directors of the London, Brighton and South Coast Railway; 1867–1896	Succeeded by Lord Cottesloe
