= Robert Munro, 1st Baron Alness =

British politician (1868–1955)

The Right Honourable The Lord Alness GBE PC DL
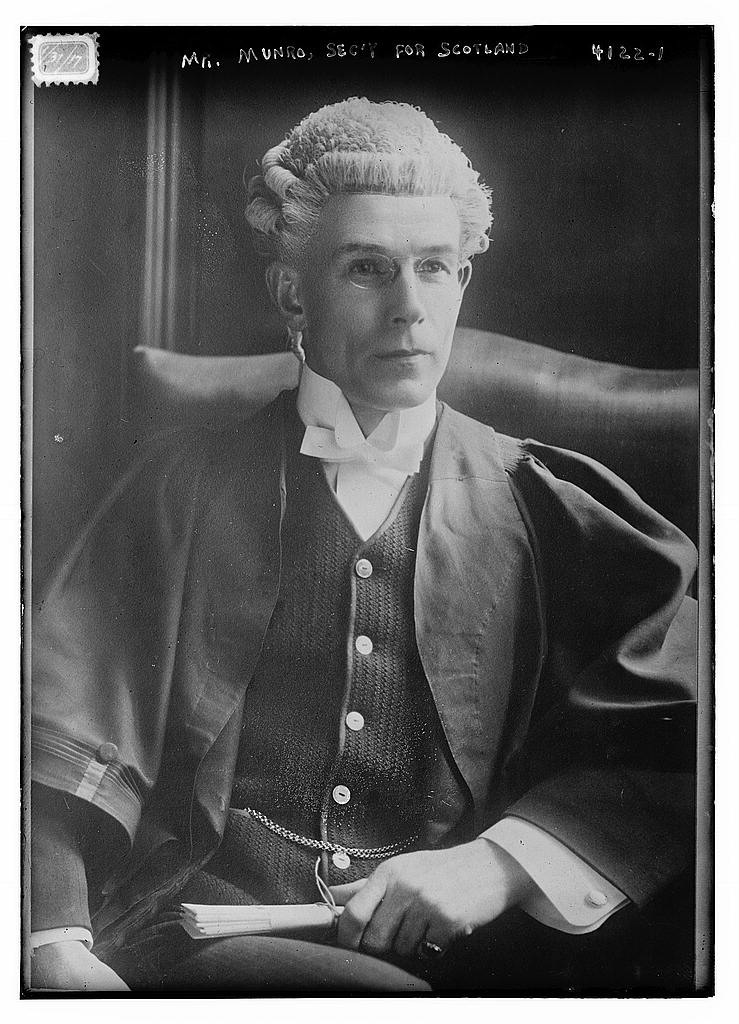
- Robert Munro in 1915

Lord Advocate
- In office 30 October 1913 – 5 December 1916
- Monarch: George V
- Prime Minister: H. H. Asquith
- Preceded by: Alexander Ure
- Succeeded by: James Avon Clyde

Secretary for Scotland
- In office 10 December 1916 – 19 October 1922
- Monarch: George V
- Prime Minister: David Lloyd George
- Preceded by: Harold Tennant
- Succeeded by: The Viscount Novar

Lord Justice Clerk
- In office 1922–1933
- Monarch: George V
- Preceded by: The Lord Dickson
- Succeeded by: The Lord Aitchison

Personal details
- Born: 28 May 1868 Alness, Ross-shire
- Died: 6 October 1955 (aged 87) Bournemouth, Hampshire
- Party: Liberal; Liberal National
- Spouses: Edith Evans (m. 1898; died 1920) Olga Grumler (m. 1921)
- Education: University of Edinburgh

Robert Munro, 1st Baron Alness, GBE PC DL (28 May 1868 – 6 October 1955), was a Scottish lawyer, judge and Liberal Party politician. He served as Secretary for Scotland between 1916 and 1922 in David Lloyd George's coalition government and as Lord Justice Clerk between 1922 and 1933.

== Early life and education ==
Munro was born in Alness, Ross-shire, the son of Margaret (née Sinclair), daughter of the Reverend John Sinclair, and the Reverend Alexander Rose Munro. He was educated at Aberdeen Grammar School and the University of Edinburgh.

== Legal and political career ==
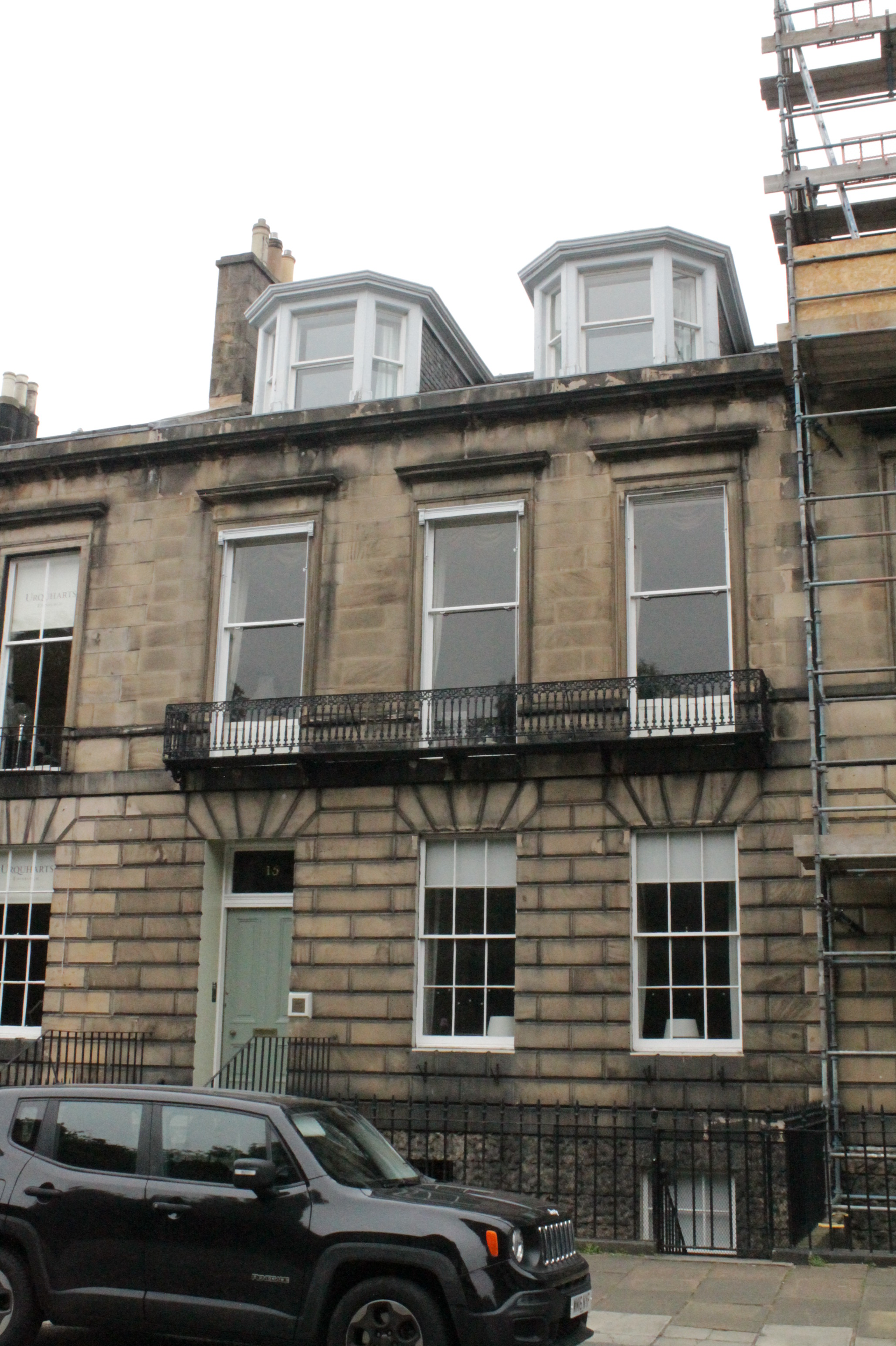
Townhouse at 15 Heriot Row, Edinburgh

Munro was admitted to the Scottish Bar as an Advocate in 1893. He was a Counsel to the Board of Inland Revenue and became a King's Counsel in 1910. At this point he lived at 15 Heriot Row: a huge Georgian townhouse in the centre of Edinburgh.

In the January 1910 general election he was elected as a Liberal Member of Parliament for Wick Burghs, holding the seat until its abolition for the 1918 election. He was then returned to the House of Commons as MP for the new Roxburgh and Selkirk constituency, holding the seat until 1922.

In 1913 Munro was sworn of the Privy Council and appointed Lord Advocate by H. H. Asquith. When David Lloyd George became Prime Minister in December 1916, Munro entered the cabinet as Secretary for Scotland, a post he held until the end of the coalition government in October 1922. In 1921 Munro was involved in forming the governments Ireland policy, which led to the Anglo-Irish Treaty. Munro advised that a moderate approach be used: "Our policy commands the assent of the civilized world outside Ireland, therefore we must beware of forfeiting the confidence of the world or abating it...a breakoff now is unthinkable. The alternative is too awful to contemplate. It means a bloody war."

The latter year he was appointed to the bench as Lord Justice Clerk and President of Second Division of the Court of Session, taking the judicial title Lord Alness. He was appointed an honorary bencher of Lincoln's Inn in 1924.

Following his retirement from the bench in 1933, he was raised to the peerage as Baron Alness, of Alness in the County of Ross and Cromarty, on 27 June 1934. He returned to political office in May 1940 when Winston Churchill appointed him a Lord-in-waiting (government whip) in the newly formed war coalition, sitting as a Liberal National. He retained this post (as one of few non-Conservatives) in Churchill's brief 1945 caretaker government. In 1946 he was invested as a Knight Grand Cross of the Order of the British Empire.

Lord Alness was also a Deputy Lieutenant of Edinburgh.

=== Famous Cases ===
- Donald Merrett murder - not proven (on direction of Lord Alness)

== Personal life and death ==
Lord Alness was twice married. He married firstly Edith Gwladys Evans, daughter of the Reverend John Llewellyn Evans, in 1898. After her death in September 1920 he married secondly Olga Marie Grumler, daughter of Jeanes Georges Grumler, in October 1921. Both marriages were childless.

Lord Alness died in October 1955, aged 87, when the barony became extinct.

Parliament of the United Kingdom
Preceded by Sir Arthur Bignold	Member of Parliament for Wick Burghs; January 1910–1918	Constituency abolished
New constituency	Member of Parliament for Roxburgh and Selkirk; 1918–1922	Succeeded by Sir Thomas Henderson
Legal offices
Preceded by Alexander Ure	Lord Advocate; 1913–1916	Succeeded by James Avon Clyde
Preceded by Lord Dickson	Lord Justice Clerk; 1922–1933	Succeeded by Lord Aitchison
Political offices
Preceded by Harold Tennant	Secretary for Scotland; 1916–1922	Succeeded by The Viscount Novar
Peerage of the United Kingdom
New creation	Baron Alness; 1934–1955	Extinct
