= Arthur Bignold =

British politician

Sir Arthur Bignold (8 July 1839 – 23 March 1915) was a Conservative politician in Scotland who served as the Member of Parliament (MP) for Wick Burghs from 1900 to 1910.

Bignold was third son of Sir Samuel Bignold, Secretary of the Norwich Union. He was educated at Trinity College, Cambridge. In 1873 he was a founding member of The Kennel Club.

He won his seat in the House of Commons at the 1900 general election, when he defeated the sitting Liberal Party MP Thomas Hedderwick. Bignold was re-elected in 1906, but lost his seat at the January 1910 general election. He stood again in December 1910, but lost again.

He was granted the freedom of the Royal burgh of Dingwall in December 1902, and knighted on 5 July 1904. He was proprietor of Lochrosque and Strathbran Estates in Ross Shire, near to Achnasheen and Achanalt and served as President of the Ross and Sutherland Benevolent Society as well as a magistrate of Ross and Cromarty and Chief of the Gaelic Society. A bagpipe march Arthur Bignold of Lochrosque is named after him.

In September 1914 Winston Churchill, when he was First Lord of the Admiralty was travelling past Bignold's home, Lochrosque Castle, to inspect the fleet at Loch Ewe. Churchill noticed a light on the roof used for lamping deer and assumed that it was being used to communicate with German spies. Churchill and his Police protection officer invaded the Castle and dismantled the light to the annoyance of Bignold.

Parliament of the United Kingdom
Preceded by Thomas Hedderwick	Member of Parliament for Wick Burghs; 1900–January 1910	Succeeded by Robert Munro
