= James Pender =

British businessman, yachtsman and politician

- Pender in 1895.

Member of Parliament for Northamptonshire Mid
- In office 1895-1900

Personal details
- Born: 28 September 1841
- Died: 20 May 1921 (aged 79)
- Party: Conservative
- Spouse: Rose Gregge-Hopwood
- Parent: John Pender (father)
- Relatives: John Denison-Pender (brother); John Denison-Pender (nephew)

Sir James Pender, 1st Baronet (28 September 1841 – 20 May 1921) was a British businessman, yachtsman and Conservative Party politician. He sat in the House of Commons from 1895 to 1900.

== Early life ==
Pender was the eldest son from Sir John Pender's first marriage to Marion Cairn. His father was the founder of the Eastern Telegraph Company, which later became Cable & Wireless. His younger half-brother was Sir John Denison-Pender, father of John Denison-Pender, 1st Baron Pender.

== Career ==
He was a director of Telegraph Construction and Maintenance Company (Telcon) taken over decades later by British Insulated Callender's Cables, director Globe Telegraph Trust, director Direct United States Cable Company Ltd, director Eastman Kodak New Jersey, and the chairman of Eastman Kodak (UK) from 1898 until 1913.

He unsuccessfully contested Northamptonshire Mid at the 1892 general election. He was elected at the 1895 general election also sat as Member of Parliament for Mid Northamptonshire, and held the seat until his defeat at the 1900 general election. On 3 September 1897 he was made a baronet, of Thornby Hall in the County of Northampton.

== Yachting ==
In 1902 Pender won the King's Cup at the Royal Yacht Squadron regatta at Cowes with his yawl Brynhild (Charles E. Nicholson design, 1899), beating the Kaiser Wilhelm's schooner Meteor III (Archibald Cary Smith design, 1902); the prize was presented to him by Albert Edward, Prince of Wales. It was rumoured at the time that the Prince gave up yacht racing in favour of horse racing (at which he was very successful) as his Yacht Britannia regularly lost to the Kaiser's yawl Meteor II (George Lennox Watson design, 1896). James Pender Bt was the Rear Commodore of Royal Thames Yacht Club in 1904, and during that year he won the Kaiserlicher Yacht Club regatta with Brynhild at the Kieler Yacht-Club and was presented with the prize by the Kaiser, who had anonymously (as he always used to at the Kiel Yacht Club) donated that prize to the Kiel Yacht Club in the name of 'A friend of Sailing'. In 1908, Pender's new Camper & Nicholsons 23mR Brynhild II defeated the Sir Thomas Lipton's Shamrock and Myles Burton Kennedy's White Heather II (both Fife designs) in the Cowes regatta and the King's Cup. James Pender's other yachts Lamorna and Florinda (later rechristened Gosport Mistake and Siesta) were all built and designed by Camper & Nicholsons.

== Personal life ==
Pender married Mary Rose Gregge-Hopwood of Hopwood Hall. They lived at Donhead House, Donhead St Andrew, Wiltshire. Sir James Pender is buried with his wife Mary Rose at St Andrew's Church, Donhead St Andrew, Wiltshire.

Parliament of the United Kingdom
Preceded by Hon. Charles Spencer	Member of Parliament for Northamptonshire Mid; 1895–1900	Succeeded by Hon. Charles Spencer
Baronetage of the United Kingdom
New creation	Baronet (of Thornby Hall); 1897–1921	Extinct
Preceded by Peel baronets	Pender baronets of Thornby Hall; 3 September 1897	Succeeded by Ripley baronets
