= George Loch =

George Loch (1811 – 18 August 1877) was a Scottish Liberal Party politician. He was elected as the member of parliament (MP) for Wick at the 1868 general election, but resigned his seat on 6 February 1872 by becoming Steward of the Manor of Northstead.

Legal offices
Preceded by Sir William Alexander, 3rd Bt	Attorney-General of the Duchy of Cornwall; 1873–1877	Succeeded by Alfred Thesiger
Parliament of the United Kingdom
Preceded by Samuel Laing	Member of Parliament for Wick; 1868 – 1872	Succeeded by John Pender
