= Saltburn, Ross and Cromarty =

Coordinates: 57.69887°N 4.14571°W

Saltburn: Scottish Gaelic: Allt an t-Salainn
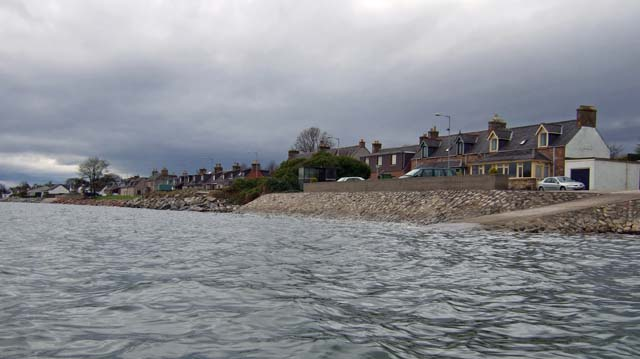

- Location within the Ross and Cromarty area
- OS grid reference: NH722696
- Council area: Highland
- Country: Scotland
- Sovereign state: United Kingdom
- Post town: Invergordon
- Postcode district: IV18 0
- Police: Scotland
- Fire: Scottish
- Ambulance: Scottish

Saltburn (Scottish Gaelic: Allt an t-Salainn) is a long linear coastal village, which is situated on the northern shore of the Cromarty Firth, in Ross-shire, Scottish Highlands, and is in the Scottish council area of Highland.

The village developed in the same manner as Invergordon, in connection with the Royal Naval base.
