= Eastern Telegraph Company =

- Industry: Telecommunications
- Predecessor: Several
- Founded: 1872; 154 years ago
- Founders: John Pender and James Anderson
- Headquarters: Moorgate, London, United Kingdom
- Products: Submarine communications cables,
- Parent: Cable & Wireless Communications

The Eastern Telegraph Company was a British telecommunication company that operated undersea telegraph cables between the United Kingdom and India and countries on-route as well as cables from the United Kingdom to North and South America.

It was founded in 1872 and would become the largest cable operating company in the world during the 20th century.

== History ==
The company was founded in 1872 through an amalgamation of several smaller telegraph companies. Its founding chairman was by John Pender, with Sir James Anderson filling the role of Managing Director.

The company predecessors included; China Submarine Telegraph Company, British-Indian Submarine Telegraph Company, Falmouth, Gibraltar and Malta Telegraph Company, and the Anglo-Mediterranean Telegraph Company.

Pender created multiple cable companies due to high risk of cable laying, once successful he would merge these companies together to eventually create Cable & Wireless plc.

The company is now a dormant subsidiary of Cable & Wireless Communications, part of Liberty Latin America.
