= John Pender =

British politician and industrialist (1816–1896)

Sir John Pender GCMG, FSA, FRSE
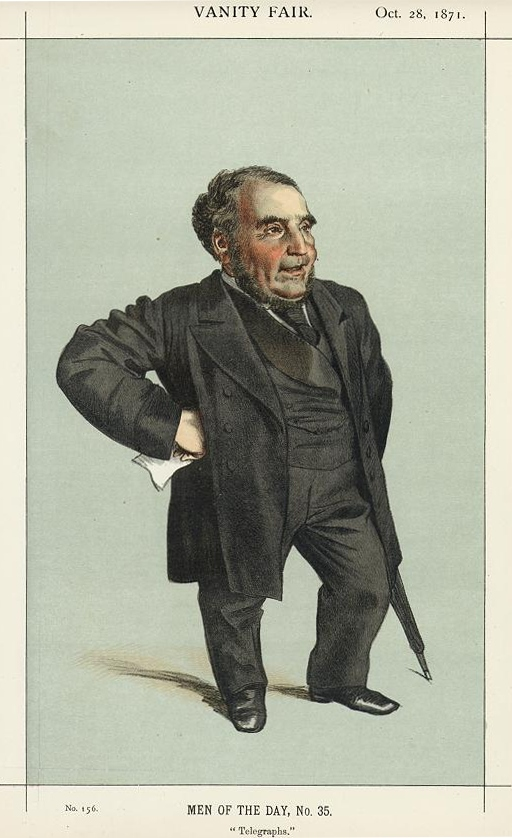
- October 1871 caricature of Pender from Vanity Fair
- Born: 10 September 1816; Vale of Leven, Scotland
- Died: 7 July 1896 (aged 79); Foots Cray, England
- Occupations: Submarine cable technician politician

Sir John Pender GCMG FSA FRSE (10 September 1816 – 7 July 1896) was a Scottish submarine communications cable pioneer and politician.

== Early life ==
Pender was born in the Vale of Leven, Scotland, the son of James Pender and his wife, Marion Mason. He was educated at Glasgow High School. He became a successful merchant in textile fabrics, first in Glasgow, then in Manchester (where he had a warehouse in Peter Street near The Great Northern Warehouse). He lived at Middleton Hall, County Linlithgow, Foots Cray Place, Sidcup, Kent, and Arlington House, 18 Arlington Street London.

== Telegraph companies ==
In London 1866, Pender was the leading financier/director and Chairman of the Companies involved who, with his colleagues, undertook the first successful laying of the transatlantic cable from Valentia Island off the coast of Ireland to Heart's Content, Newfoundland and Labrador. This cable was the most successful and commercially viable of all the transatlantic cables and was 100% British financed, unlike the previous transatlantic cable-laying attempts, which had had some financial backing from American Investors. The Anglo-American Telegraph Company (formerly the Atlantic Telegraph Company) and The Gutta Percha Company and Glass, Elliott (Greenwich, London) merged into the Telegraph Construction and Maintenance Company 'Telcon' (which was taken over decades later by British Insulated Callender's Cables), and laid the first successful cable in 1866 and ended up manufacturing and laying all of Eastern Telegraph's cables and most of the submarine telegraph cables of the rest of the world.

He founded 32 telegraph companies, including Eastern Telegraph Company, Eastern and South African Telegraph, Western Telegraph Europe and Azores Telegraph Company, Australasia and China Telegraph Company, London Platino-Brazilian Telegraph Company, Pacific and European Telegraph Company which later became Cable & Wireless. In 1934, Imperial and International Communications, formerly the Eastern Telegraph Company (the amalgamation of those 32 telegraph companies), became Cable & Wireless. The new name was designed to more clearly reflect the combined radio and cable services which it offered, without reference to the Empire. Cable & Wireless is one of the world's leading international communications companies. It operates through two standalone business units. International and Europe, Asia & U.S.

Together with City financiers Leopold Salomons and Jabez Balfour, Pender founded the investment underwriting firm the Trustees, Executors and Securities Insurance Corporation, Limited in December 1887.

== Parliament ==
Pender represented Totnes in parliament as a Liberal MP in 1862 to 1866 (the seat was disenfranchised by the Reform Act 1867), and Wick Burghs from 1872 until his defeat in 1885. He was unsuccessful Liberal Unionist candidate in Wick Burghs in 1886 and in Govan at the by-election in 1889, and again represented Wick Burghs from 1892 to 1896. He was made a K.C.M.G. in 1888 and was promoted in 1892 to be G.C.M.G.

His eldest son James (b. 1841) Sir James Pender, 1st Baronet, who was MP. for Mid Northamptonshire in 1895–1900, was created a baronet in 1897; and his third son, John Denison-Pender (b. 1855), was created a K.C.M.G. in 1901, the year in which he was living at Footscray Place in Sidcup.

== Railways and paintings ==
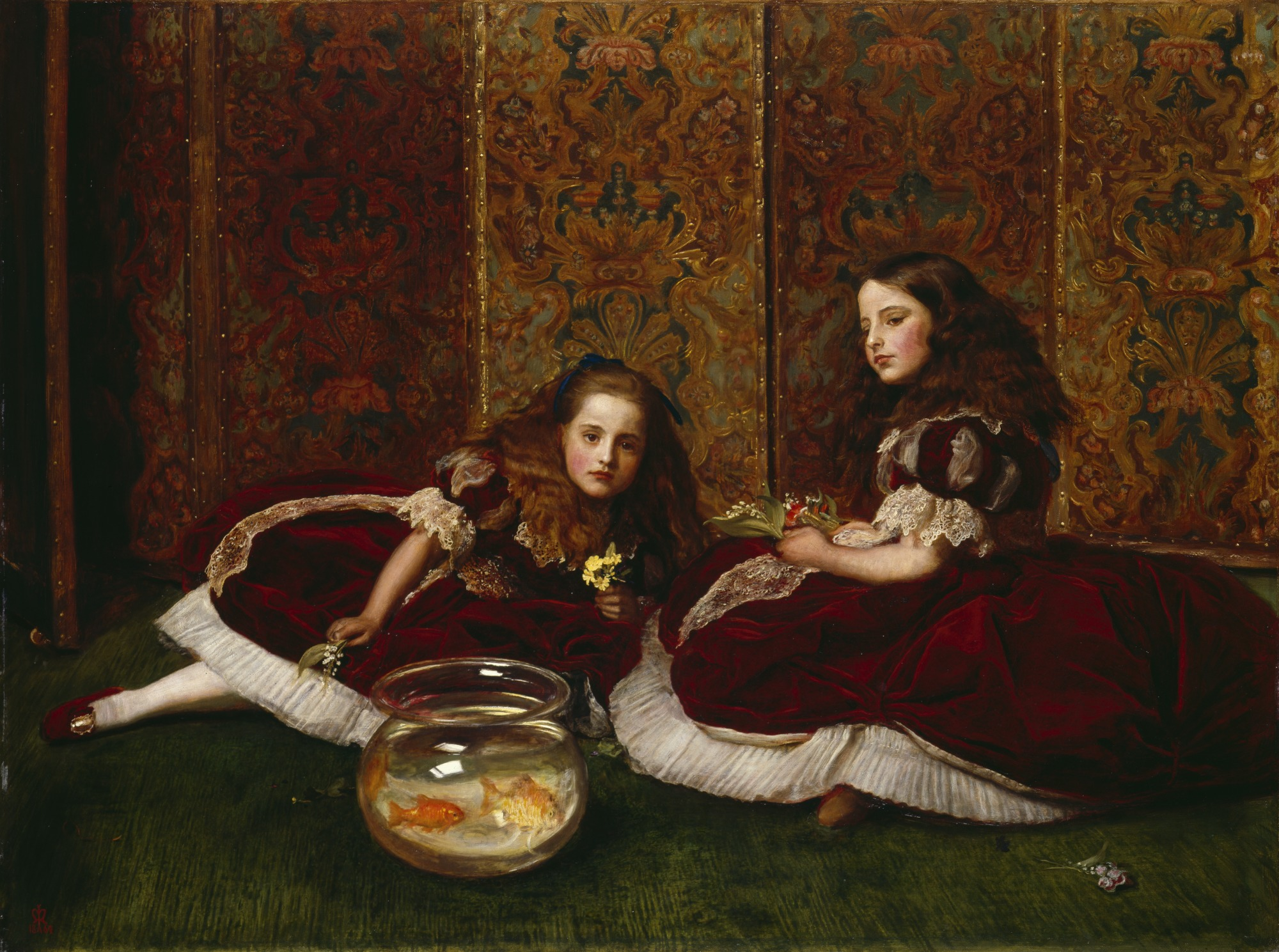
Leisure Hours by John Everett Millais. An 1864 double portait of Pender's daughters.

Pender also had interests in railways and was persuaded to invest in the Isle of Man Steam Railway. As a result of this, No. 3 was named Pender in his honour. He was a director of the Chicago, St. Paul, Minneapolis & Omaha Railway in the United States, which connected major midwestern cities and stimulated their economies. In 1883 he founded Yule Ranch in western North Dakota. Pender, Nebraska was named for him.

He also amassed a considerable collection of paintings, including some of the works of J. M. W. Turner, including Giudecca La Donna Della Salute and San Georgio, a view of Venice. Exhibited at the Royal Academy in 1841 and arguably Turner's best work, it was sold in 1897 for 1,650 guineas to Donald Currie. A century later it broke all auction records for works by a British artist when it was sold to Steve Wynn (entrepreneur) through Christie's (New York) for US$35.8 Million in April 2006 This painting is one of four of Turner's paintings of Venice to be in private hands. Also in Pender's collection were the works An Event in the forest by Landseer, 'Portrait of Princess Sobieski' by Joshua Reynolds, and works by John Everett Millais, Gainsborough, and Canaletto. The collection was sold in parts the year after John Pender's death.

== Family relationships ==
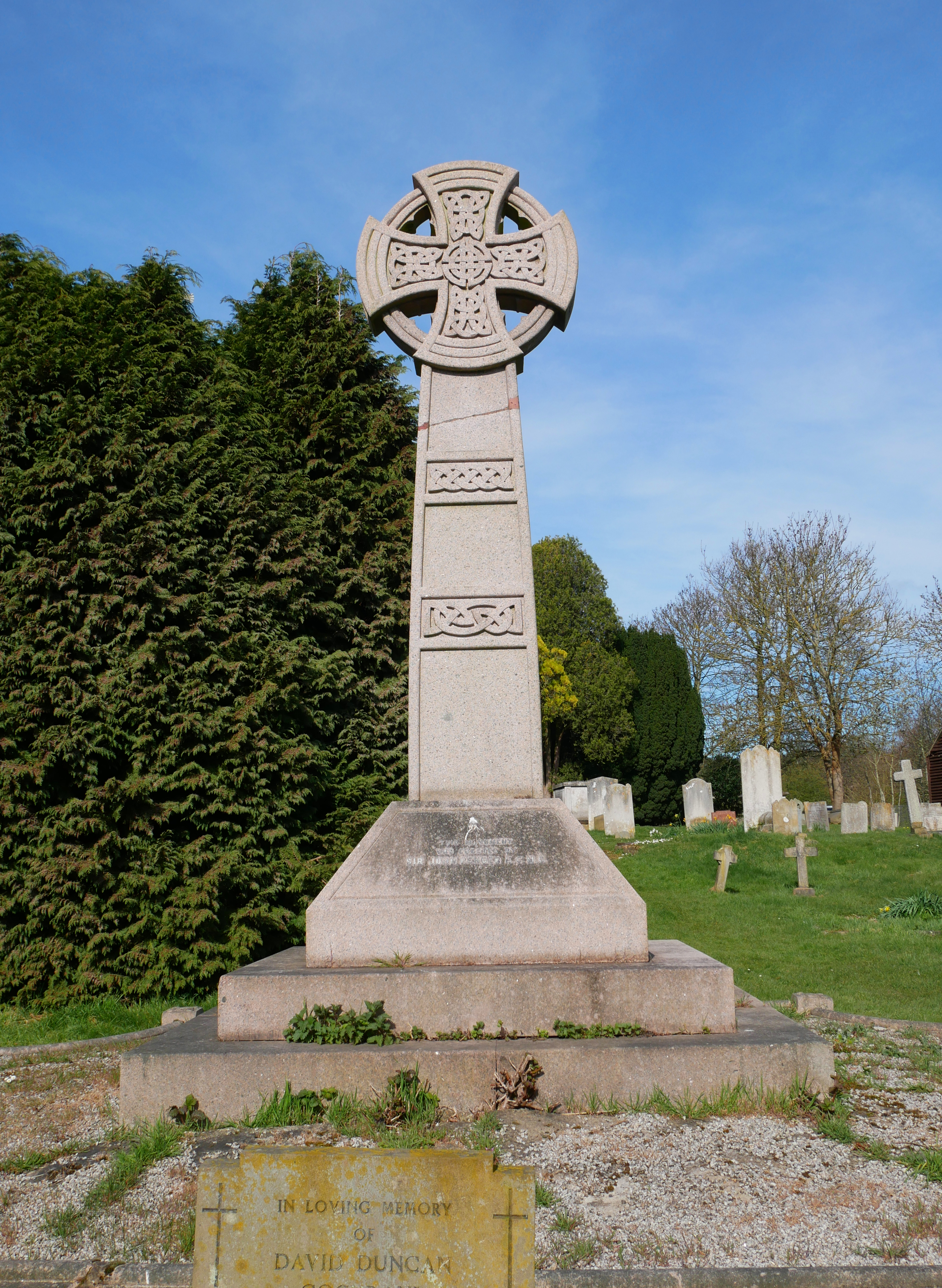
Grave of Pender in the Church of All Saints, Foots Cray

At the time of his death in Foots Cray Place, Kent, on 7 July 1896, he controlled companies having a capital of 15 million sterling and owning 73,640 nautical miles (136,380 km) of cables (one third of the cables in the world); these cables formed the base of the networks that years later developed into the World Wide Web.

Pender was married twice: firstly in 1840 to Marion Cairns, who died giving birth to his son Henry in 1841 (their eldest son James survived); and in 1851 he married Emma Denison (d.1890). They also had a son John Denison Pender (1855–1929) and two daughters Marion Denison Pender (1856–1955), who married George William Des Voeux, and Anne Denison Pender (1853–1902). The girls were painted in an Aesthetic Movement portrait titled "Leisure Hours" by John Everett Millais in 1864 Detroit Institute of Arts. Pender is buried in the grounds of All Saints' Church, Rectory Lane Foots Cray with a fine but simple Celtic cross memorial, and is also remembered via the inauguration of the Pender Chair from the money raised by the memorial fund at the time of his death.

== Trustees, Executors and Securities Insurance Corporation, Limited ==
Together with City financiers Leopold Salomons and Jabez Balfour, Pender founded the investment underwriting firm the Trustees, Executors and Securities Insurance Corporation, Limited in December 1887.

== See also ==
- Pender v Lushington

Parliament of the United Kingdom
Preceded by The Earl of Gifford; Thomas Mills	Member of Parliament for Totnes; 1862–1867; With: The Earl of Gifford 1862–1863; Alfred Seymour 1863–1867	Succeeded by Alfred Seymour; Other seat vacant, until disenfranchisement
Preceded by George Loch	Member of Parliament for Wick Burghs; 1872–1885	Succeeded by John Macdonald Cameron
Preceded by John Macdonald Cameron	Member of Parliament for Wick Burghs; 1892–1896	Succeeded by Thomas Hedderwick
