= January 1910 United Kingdom general election in England =

- 15 Jan. - 10 Feb.1910

All 461 English seats to the House of Commons
- Turnout: 87.7% (▲4.1 pp)
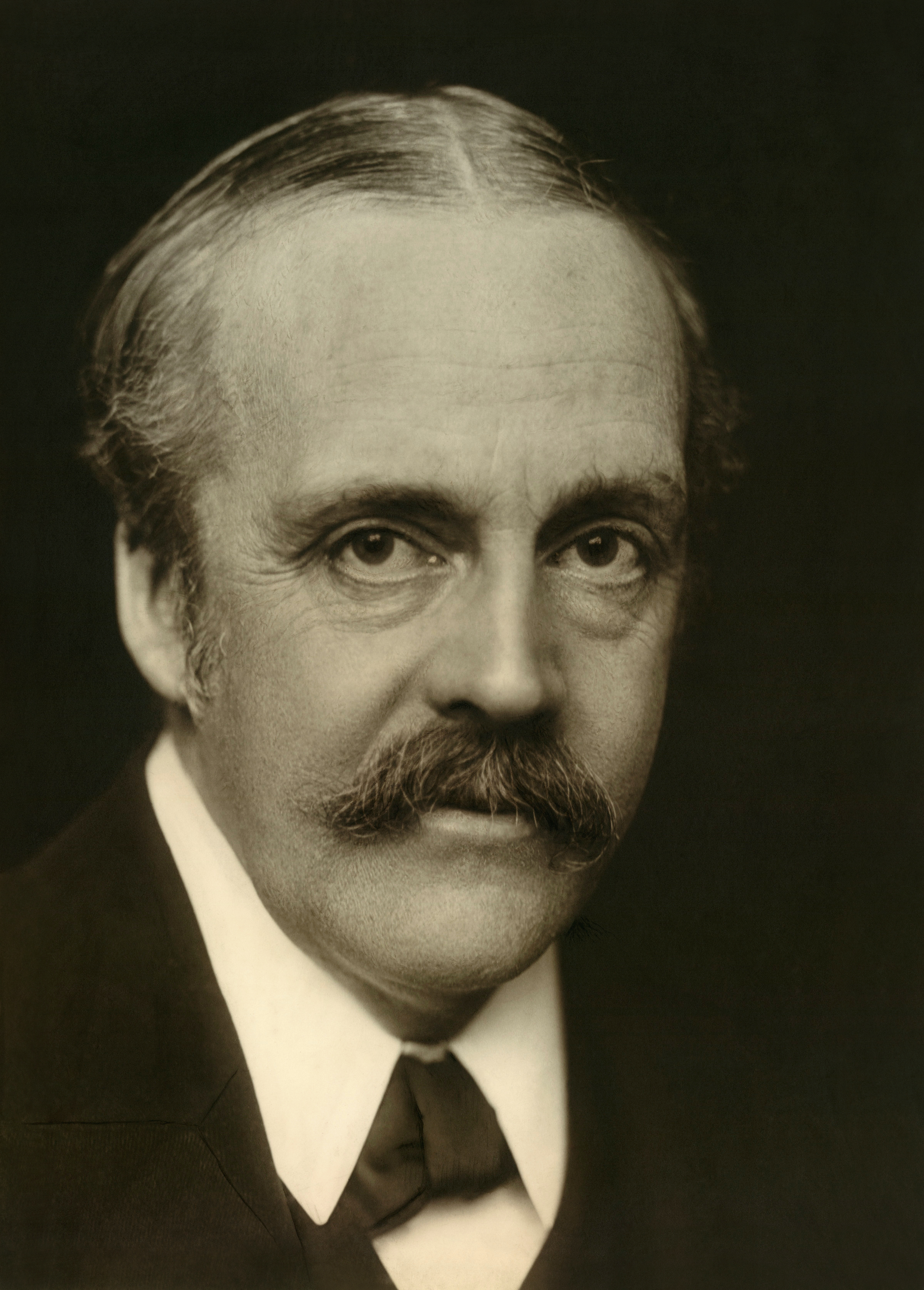

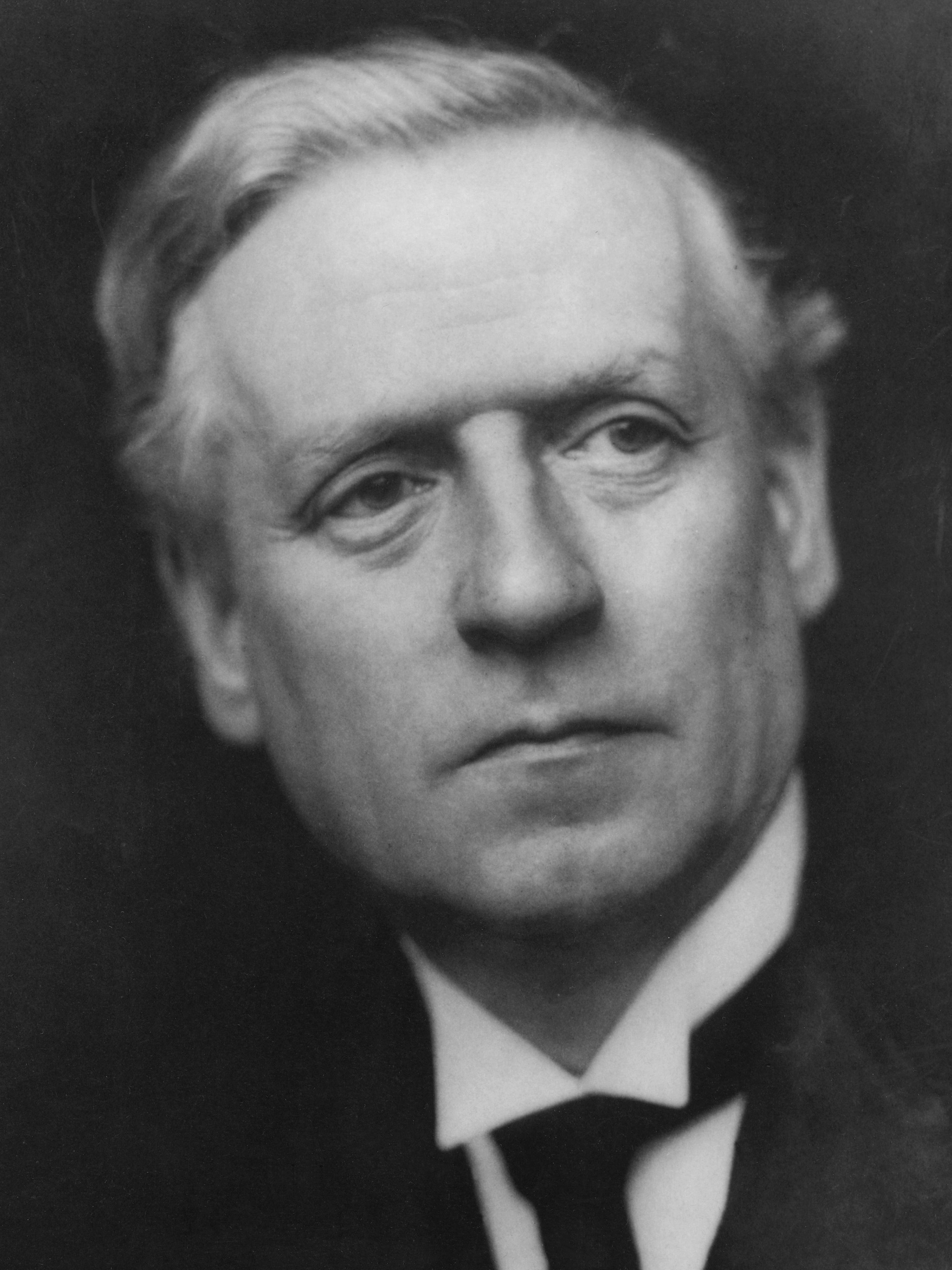

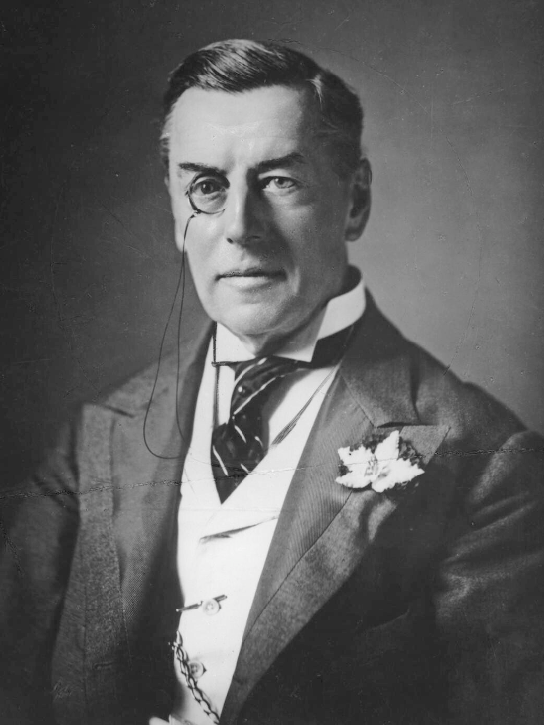

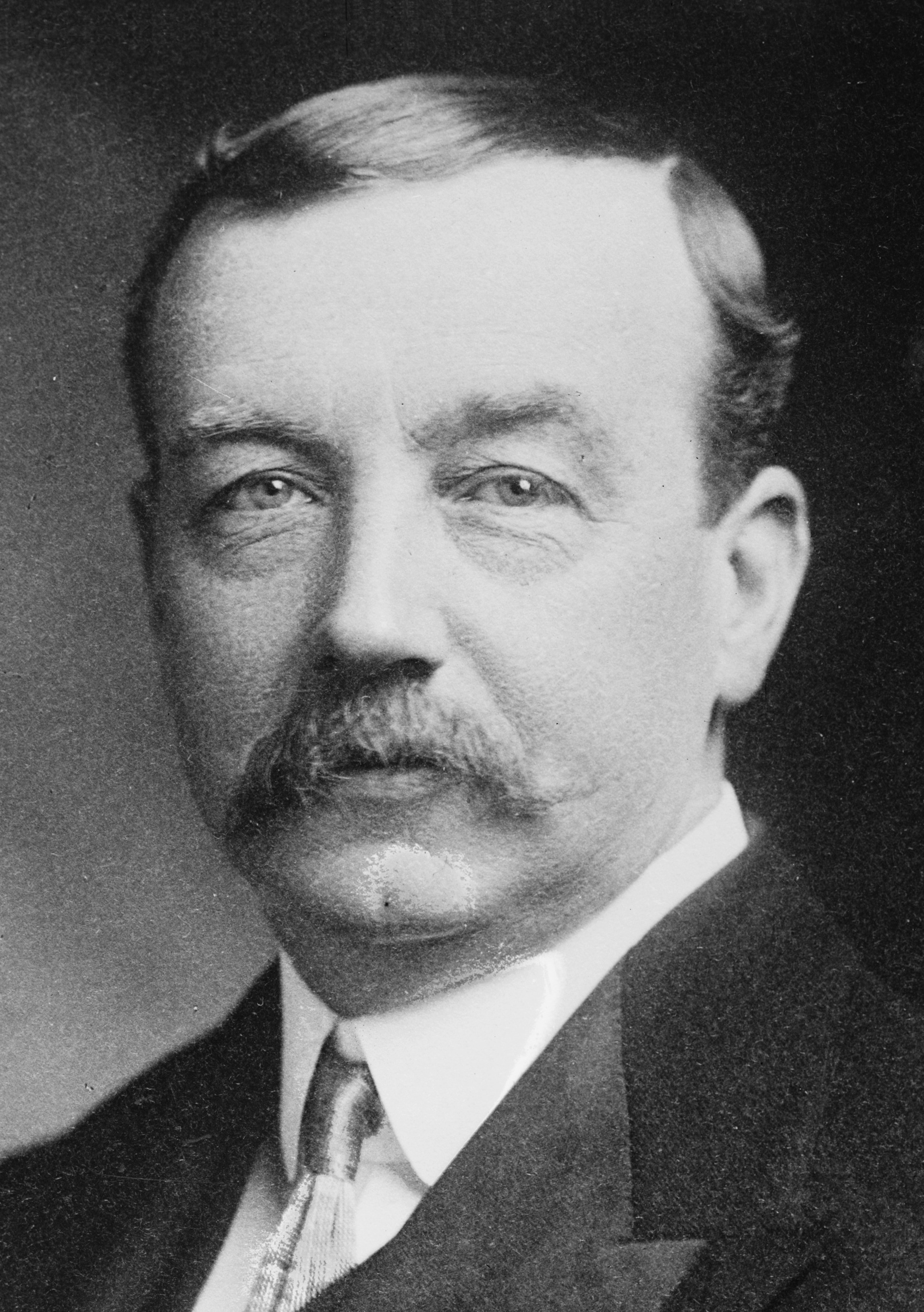
	First party	Second party
Leader	Arthur Balfour	H. H. Asquith
Party	Conservative	Liberal
Alliance	Conservative-Liberal Unionist
Leader since	11 June 1902	30 April 1908
Leader's seat	City of London	East Fife
Last election	107 seats, (Note: Combined results for borough, county and university seats) 37.8%	306 seats, 49.0%
Seats won	201 (Note: Figure includes Speaker of the House of Commons James Lowther in Penrith.)	188
Seat change	▲94	▼118
Popular vote	2,252,983 (Note: Total and percentage votes given here are for territorial constituencies only)	2,291,062
Percentage	42.0%	43.0%
Swing	▲4.2 pp	▼6.0 pp
	Third party	Fourth party
Leader	Joseph Chamberlain	Arthur Henderson
Party	Liberal Unionist	Labour
Alliance	Conservative-Liberal Unionist
Leader since	1903	22 January 1908
Leader's seat	Birmingham West	Barnard Castle
Last election	20 seats, 6.5%	26 seats, 5.3%
Seats won	37	33
Seat change	▲17	▲7
Popular vote	392,931	403,358
Percentage	7.3%	6.9%
Swing	▲0.8 pp	▲1.6 pp

From 15 January to 10 February 1910, the January 1910 United Kingdom general election was held in England, to elect all 670 members of the House of Commons, with 461 seats being in England. 456 seats represented territorial constituencies contested under the first past the post electoral system, and several multi-member constituencies under the block voting system; and 5 additional seats represented the 3 university constituencies which returned members under different voting systems.

The election was called amid a constitutional crisis after the Conservative-dominated House of Lords rejected the People's Budget. The Liberal government, sought a dissolution of parliament for the election seeking a mandate, however lost their majority. It was the second of two general elections held during the reign of King Edward VII, due to his death in May 1910.

The election resulted in a hung parliament in which the Conservative Party, along with its long-time ally, the Liberal Unionist Party won the most votes, but with the Liberal Party under H. H. Asquith won the most seats. Another election followed in December as the Liberal government sought a mandate for the Parliament Act 1911, which would prevent the House of Lords from permanently blocking legislation linked to money bills.

== Candidates ==
Below is a table summarising the candidates of the January 1910 general election in England, excluding those in the university constituencies.

Affiliation	Candidates
Liberal Party	405
Conservative Party	381
Liberal Unionist Party	72
Labour Party	62
Social Democratic Federation	8
Free Trader	3 (Note: The candidates that stood were George Bethell in Holderness, Sir Charles Seely in Lincoln and Harold Cox in Preston.)
Independent Conservative	2 (Note: The candidates that stood were Francis Bennett-Goldney in Canterbury and Richard Jebb in Marylebone East.)
Independent Labour	2 (Note: The candidates that stood were William Gee in Ashton-under-Lyne and A. A. Purcell in Salford West.)
Colne Valley Labour Union	1 (Note: Candidate Victor Grayson stood in Colne Valley.)
Independent Tariff Reform	1 (Note: Candidate Samuel Storey stood in Sunderland.)
Women's Suffrage	1 (Note: Candidate Arthur Bulley stood in Rossendale.)
Independent Liberal	1 (Note: Candidate Edwin Jellicoe stood in Liverpool Walton.)
Nationalist Party	1 (Note: Candidate T. P. O'Connor stood in Liverpool Scotland.)
Total	940

== Analysis ==
=== Liberal Party ===
The Liberal Party under leader H. H. Asquith saw a severe drop in seats from its high 306 seat count at the previous election. In terms of vote share, the party took 43.0% of the vote, a decrease of 6.0% when compared to the previous election. The party won Hoxton, Darwen and Stockton-on-Tees and one of the two seats in Blackburn from the Conservatives, as well as Great Grimsby, Darlington and South East Durham from the Liberal Unionist Party. It therefore won 7 seats, but with 125 other losses across England to other parties, the party fell to 188 seats in total.

Within the Liberal Party, several Liberal-Labour MPs that held their seats, with several who had won or kept their seats from the previous election defecting directly to the Labour Party, some of which were successful again their former party while others were defeated by Liberal candidates. Such remaining Liberal-Labour members within the Liberal Party were those in Battersea, St Pancras East, Stoke-upon-Trent, Salford North, Birkenhead, Mid Durham, Morpeth, Wansbeck. As such, the Liberals took 306 seats, within which 8 were held by Liberal-Labour MPs.

=== Conservative Party ===
The Conservative Party, led by Arthur Balfour, saw a significant recovery from the previous election, with the party increasing its vote share by 4.2% to 42.0%. The party also recovered in terms of seats, with the party gaining net of 94 seats, with 100 gains and 6 losses. Leader of the Conservative Party Arthur Balfour, who had lost his seat at the last election, re-entered Parliament in City of London at the February 1906 City of London by-election. He retained his seat at this election with an increased vote share. Between the Conservatives and allies, the Liberal Unionist Party, each saw an increase of 111 seats and increase in vote share by 5.0% to 49.3% in England. Although the parties would together get a majority of seats in England, nationally they were not able to form a government against the Liberals.

The party gained a net of 100 seats alone. However, it lost Hoxton, Darwen and Stockton-on-Tees to the Liberal Party, as well as one of the two seats in Blackburn to the Liberals. It also lost Wigan to Labour, and internally to the Liberal Unionists, it lost St George's, Hannover Square.

One notable politician to face his first general election was future Prime Minister Stanley Baldwin, who entered Parliament at the 1908 Bewdley by-election following the death of his father and incumbent MP Alfred Baldwin. Baldwin retained the seat for the Conservatives at this election with over 70.0% of the vote.

Outside of the official party, Independent Conservative Samuel Storey, who stood under the label of Independent Tariff Reform, won one of the two seats in Sunderland, with the Conservatives taking the other. Storey's win was a gain from the Liberal Party.

=== Liberal Unionist Party ===
The Liberal Unionist Party, led by Joseph Chamberlain also saw a significant recovery at this election, with a 0.8% increase in vote to 7.3% of the vote. The party retained Totnes, Aylesbury, Ludlow, Burton, Handsworth, East Worcestershire, West Derbyshire and Durham. The party may have retained the seat of North Lonsdale. Seminal collations classed George Haddock as a holding Conservative; however, subsequent research on Haddock's candidature placed him instead as a Liberal Unionist, with the party thereby retaining the seat.

It also retained its university constituency seats in London University and Oxford University. It also held its metropolitan Birmingham seats of Birmingham Bordesley, Birmingham Central, Birmingham North, Birmingham South and Birmingham West. The party gained East Somerset, Cricklade, Mile End, St Pancras South, Mid Norfolk, West Staffordshire, Ross, Droitwich, Manchester South West. It also gained one of the two seats in Portsmouth.

Of some dispute is the nature of further gains, as to whether they were gains for the Conservative Party or the Liberal Unionists. Seminal collations of the seat counts present 10 of the collective gains for the alliance as a Conservative gains , however, subsequent research into the candidates suggested that each candidate under the already relatively merged Conservative and Liberal Unionist local organisations were, in fact, Liberal Unionists. As such the Liberal Unionists also gained Maldon, Hitchin, Watford, Chertsey, Guildford, Paddington North, Cambridge, Cheltenham, Penryn and Falmouth, and Walsall from the Liberal Party, with each becoming Liberal Unionist MPs rather than winning Conservatives.

Furthermore, in exchange with the allied Conservatives, the Liberal Unionists gained Westminster St George's, Hannover Square from the Conservative Party, with Alfred Lyttelton retaining the seat following the 1906 St George's, Hanover Square by-election after the Conservative incumbent MP Heneage Legge resigned from government and Parliament.

However, it lost Croydon. Following the death of incumbent Liberal Unionist MP, Hugh Oakeley Arnold-Forster, the Conservative Party won the seat at the 1909 Croydon by-election. It was a gain at this election through the retention of the Conservatives from its ally, although the Liberal Unionist did not stand against the Conservativs. It also lost Great Grimsby, Darlington and South East Durham to the Liberal Party. As such, with 21 gains and 4 losses, the Liberal Unionists increased it seat count to 37 in England, rather than older estimate which placed that party as holding 26 seats.

=== Labour Party ===
The Labour Party which had emerged from the Labour Representation Committee following the last election, increased its number of seats as well as seeing a rise in vote share to 6.9% in England. The party retained its seats of Deptford, West Ham South, Barrow and Furness, Clitheroe, Gorton, Ince, Manchester North East, Newton, St Helens, Westhoughton, Barnard Castle, Bradford West and Leeds East. It also held one of the two seats in Norwich, Leicester, Blackburn, Bolton, Stockport, Newcastle-upon-Tyne and Halifax.

Many of its gains at this election came from the phenomena of several Liberal-sponsored Liberal-Labour incumbents MPs defecting fully to the Labour Party, and retaining their seats, which were gains from the Liberal to Labour. Labour won Hanley from the Liberal Party, with sitting Liberal-Labour MP Enoch Edwards defecting to Labour, and winning his seat from the Liberals. Similarly, in Nuneaton, sitting Liberal-Labour faction MP William Johnson defected to Labour and retained his seat again the Liberals, with James Haslam in Chesterfield, John Wadsworth in Hallamshire and Frederick Hall in Normanton doing the same.

Labour gained North West Staffordshire, Mid Derbyshire, North East Derbyshire, Manchester East and Sheffield Attercliffe directly from the Liberal Party. It gained Wigan from the Conservatives. It also won one of the two seats in Derby from the Liberals. In the seat of Chester-le-Street, John Wilkinson Taylor was elected as an Independent Labour MP, but had joined the Labour Party officially, and stood for it successfully as this election. This represented a further gain for Labour. However, the party lost Chatham, Woolwich, Wolverhampton West, one the two seats in Preston, and one of the two seats in Sunderland to the Conservative Party. It also lost Manchester South West to the Liberal Unionists. With 13 gains and 6 losses, the Labour Party saw it representation in England rise to a total of 33 seats.

== Seats summary ==
Below is a table summarising the total number of seats, gains and losses for each party in both the territorial county and borough constituencies and the university constituencies.

Party	Seats				
Party	Total	Gains	Losses	Net	Of all (%)
Conservative-Liberal Unionist	238	121	10	▲111	51.6
Conservative	201	100	6	▲94	43.6
Liberal Unionist	37	21	4	▲17	8.0
Liberal	188 (Note: Includes 8 Liberal-Labour MPs.)	7	125	▼118	40.8
Labour	33	13	6	▲7	7.2
Independent Tariff Reform	1	New		▲1	0.2
Irish Nationalist	1	0	0	Steady	0.2
Independent Labour	0	0	1	▼1	—
Total	461				

== County and borough results ==
Below is a table summarising the constituency results of the January 1910 general election in England, excluding the result in the university constituencies.

Party	Seats					Aggregate votes		
Party	Total	Gains	Losses	Net	Of total (%)	Total	Of total (%) (Note: Adjusted for multi-member constituencies.)	Change (%)
Conservative-Liberal Unionist	233	121	10	▲111	51.1	2,645,914	49.3	▲5.0
Conservative	198	100	6	▲94	43.4	2,252,983	42.0	▲4.2
Liberal Unionist	35	21	4	▲17	7.7	392,931	7.3	▲0.8
Liberal	188 (Note: Includes 8 Liberal-Labour MPs.)	7	125	▼118	41.2	2,291,062	43.0	▼6.0
Labour	33	13	6	▲7	7.2	403,358	6.9	▲1.6
Social Democratic Federation	0	0	0	Steady	—	13,840	0.3	▼0.1
Independent Tariff Reform	1 (Note: Samuel Storey in Sunderland.)	New		▲1	0.2	12,334	0.1	New
Free Trader	0	0	0	Steady	—	9,494	0.1	Steady
Colne Valley Labour	0	New			—	3,149	0.1	New
Irish Nationalist	1 (Note: T. P. O'Connor in Liverpool Scotland.)	0	0	Steady	0.2	2,943	0.1	Steady
Independent Labour	0	0	1 (Note: Chester-le-Street.)	▼1	—	2,809	0.1	▼0.3
Ind. Conservative	0	0	0	Steady	—	2,052	0.0	▼0.2
Women's Suffrage	0	New			—	639	0.0	New
Independent Liberal	0	0	0	Steady	—	451	0.0	Steady
Total	456			0	100.0	5,388,045	100.0	0.0
Registered voters, and turnout						5,720,544 (Note: Electorate in contested constituencies. The total electorate was 5,774,892.)	87.7	▲4.1

=== Popular vote ===
Popular vote
Liberal	43.0%
Conservative	42.0%
Liberal Unionist	7.3%
Labour	6.9%
Irish Nationalist	0.1%
Others	0.7%

Popular vote (alliances)
Con-LU	49.3%
Liberal	43.0%
Labour	6.9%
Irish Nationalist	0.1%
Others	0.7%

=== Parliament seats ===
Parliament seats
Conservative	43.4%
Liberal	41.2%
Liberal Unionist	7.7%
Labour	7.2%
Tariff Reform	0.2%
Irish Nationalist	0.2%

Parliament seats (alliances)
Con-LU	51.1%
Liberal	41.2%
Labour	7.2%
Tariff Reform	0.2%
Irish Nationalist	0.2%

== University constituency results ==
=== University results summary ===
Below is a table summarising the seats and vote share of the English university constituencies in the January 1910 general election.

Party	Seats				Aggregate votes	
Party	Total	Gains	Losses	Net	Total	Of all (%)
Conservative-Liberal Unionist	5	0	0	Steady	2,625	57.7
Liberal Unionist	2	0	0	Steady	2,625	57.7
Conservative	3	0	0	Steady	0	0.0
Liberal	0	0	0	Steady	1,928	42.3
Total	5				4,553	

=== Cambridge University ===
The constituency for Cambridge University returned two Members of Parliament using the Plurality block voting electoral system. The electorate consisted of graduates of the university.

General election January 1910: Cambridge University (2 seats)
Party	Candidate	Votes	%	±%
Conservative	Samuel Butcher	Unopposed		
Conservative	John Rawlinson	Unopposed		
Conservative hold				
Conservative hold				

=== London University ===
The constituency for London University returned one Member of Parliament using the First-past-the-post electoral system. The electorate consisted of graduates of the university.

General election January 1910: London University
Party	Candidate	Votes	%	±%
Liberal Unionist	Philip Magnus	2,625	57.65	+7.32
Liberal	Joseph West Ridgeway	1,928	42.35	−7.32
Majority		697	15.30	+14.64
Turnout		4,553	75.01	+4.86
Registered electors		6,070		
Liberal Unionist hold		Swing	+7.32	

=== Oxford University ===
The constituency for Oxford University returned two Members of Parliament using the Plurality block voting electoral system. The electorate consisted of graduates of the university.

General election 15 January 1910: Oxford University (2 seats)
Party	Candidate	Votes	%	±%
Liberal Unionist	Sir William Anson	Unopposed		
Conservative	Lord Hugh Cecil	Unopposed		
Liberal Unionist hold				
Conservative hold				

== See also ==
- January 1910 United Kingdom general election in Ireland
- January 1910 United Kingdom general election in Scotland
- January 1910 United Kingdom general election in Wales
- List of United Kingdom Parliament constituencies (1885–1918) by region
