= January 1910 United Kingdom general election in Ireland =

- 15–28 January 1910

103 seats for Ireland of the 670 seats in the House of Commons
- Turnout: 80.3% (▼1.8 pp)
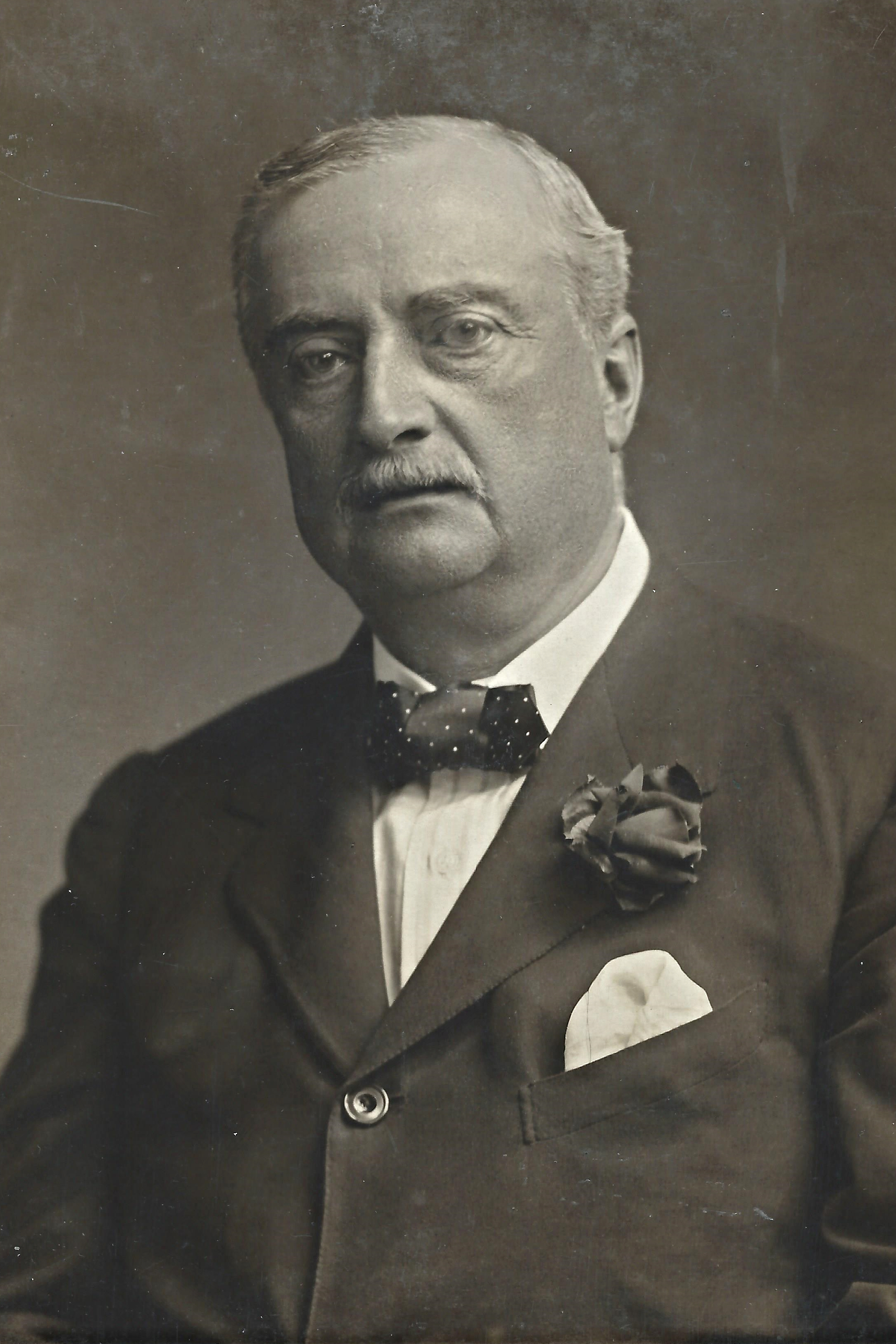

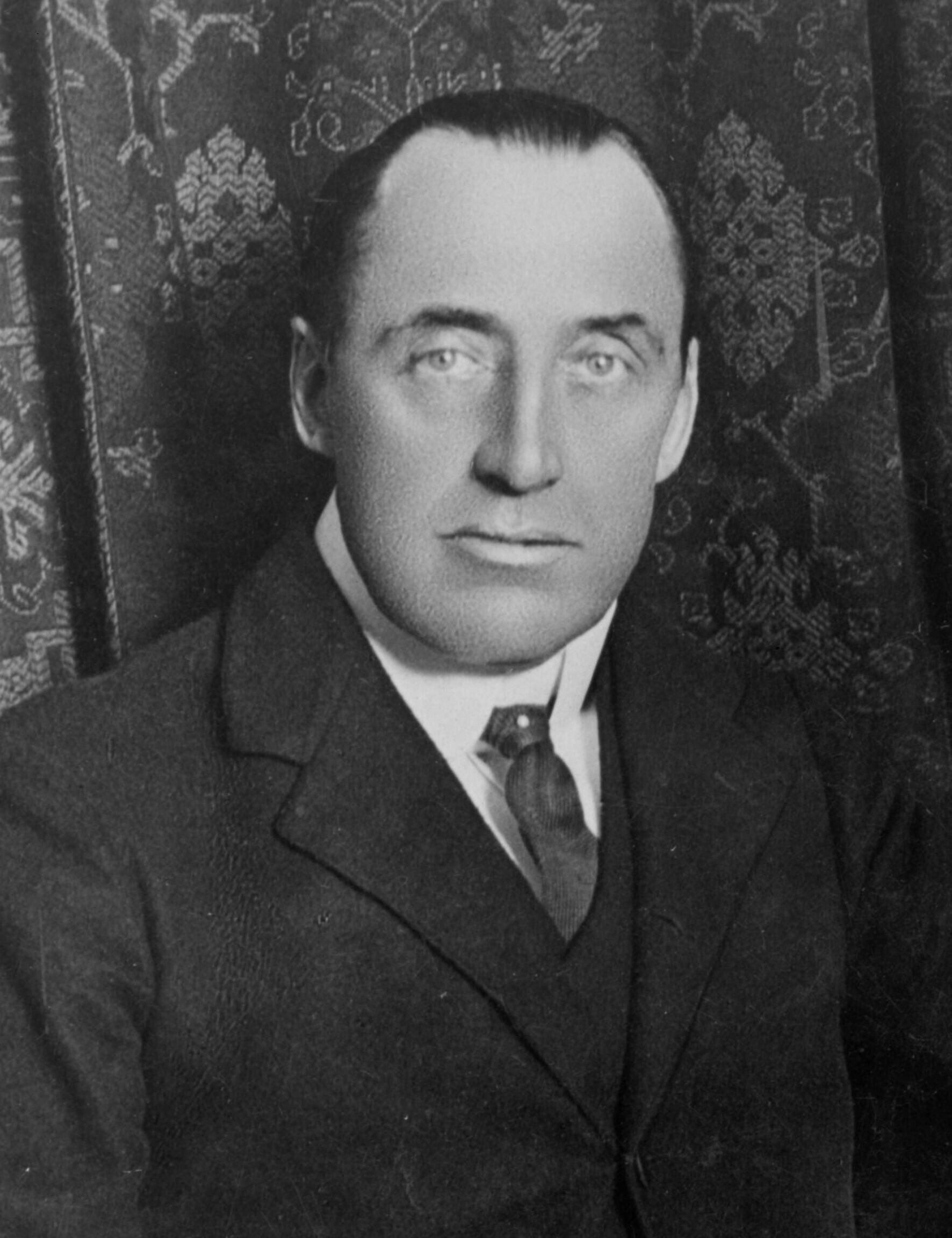

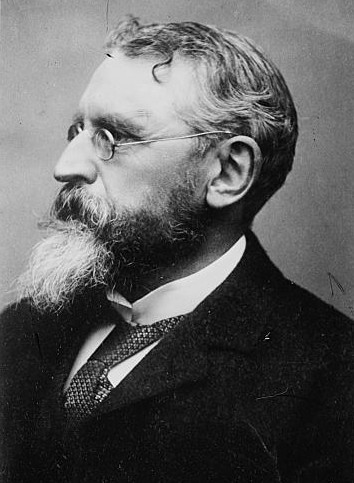

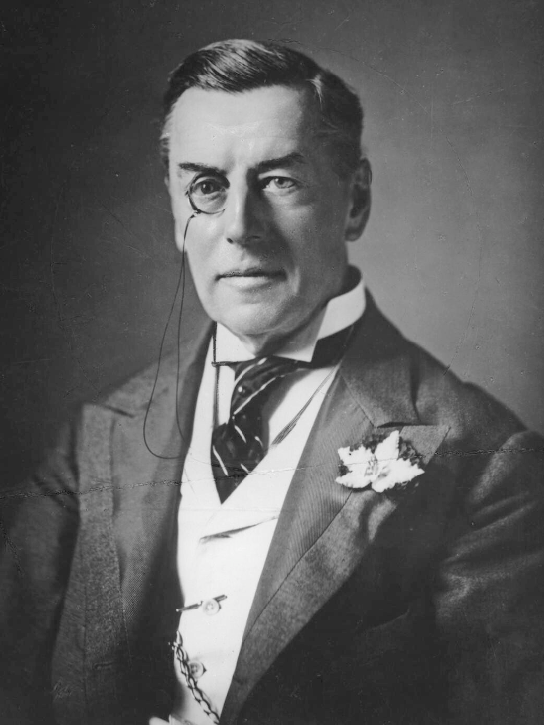

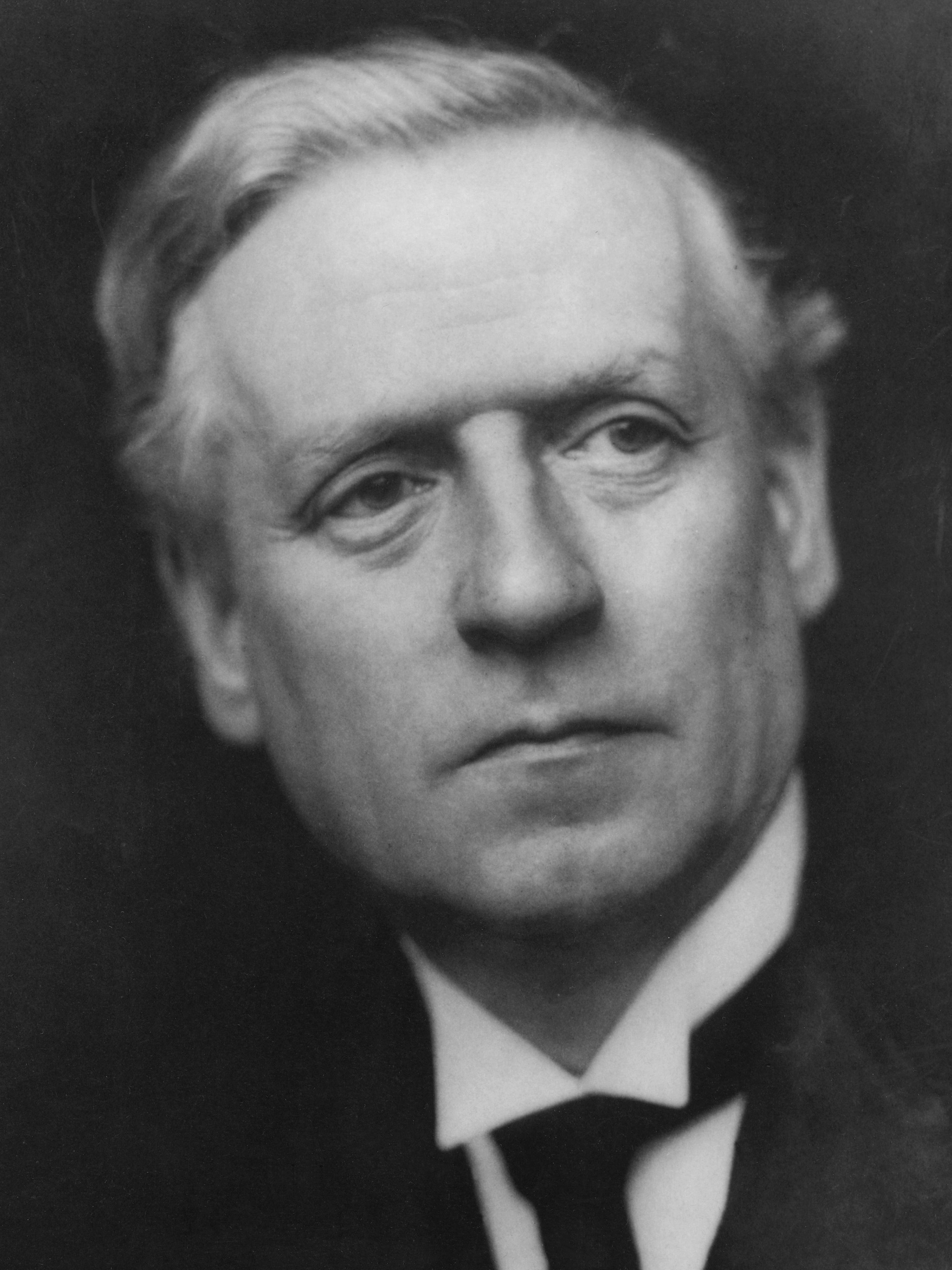
	First party	Second party	Third party
Leader	John Redmond	Edward Carson	William O'Brien
Party	Irish Parliamentary	Irish Unionist	All-for-Ireland
Alliance		Conservative-Liberal Unionist
Leader since	1900	1910	15 January 1910
Leader's seat	Waterford City	Dublin University	Cork City
Last election	81 seats, 21.0%	16 seats, 39.1%	Did not stand
Seats won	70	18	8
Seat change	▼11	▲2	▲8
Popular vote	78,154	58,424	27,987
Percentage	33.4%	27.9%	12.7%
Swing	▲12.4 pp	▼11.2 pp	New party
	Fourth party	Fifth party
Leader	Joseph Chamberlain	H. H. Asquith
Party	Liberal Unionist	Liberal
Alliance	Conservative-Liberal Unionist
Leader since	1903	30 April 1908
Leader's seat	Birmingham West	East Fife
Last election	1 seat, 7.9%	1 seat, 2.2%
Seats won	3	1
Seat change	▲2	Steady
Popular vote	10,558	20,339
Percentage	4.8%	9.6%
Swing	▼3.1 pp	▲7.4 pp

From 15 January to 10 February 1910, the January 1910 United Kingdom general election was held in Ireland. Of the 670 seats in the House of Commons, 103 were in Ireland; 101 represented 100 county and borough territorial constituencies, with 2 seats representing Cork City; and two additional seats represented the Dublin University wherein only graduates of the university could vote.

The election was called amid a constitutional crisis after the Conservative-dominated House of Lords rejected the People's Budget. The Liberal government, who sought a dissolution of parliament for the election seeking a mandate, however lost their majority. It was the second of two general elections held during the reign of King Edward VII, after his death in May 1910.

The election resulted in a hung parliament in which the Conservative Party, along with its long-time ally, the Liberal Unionist Party winning the most votes, but with the Liberal Party under H. H. Asquith winning the most seats. The Liberal Party lost its majority, and was dependent on the Irish Parliamentary Party, the breakaway All-for-Ireland League, and the Labour Party.

Another election followed in December as the Liberal government sought a mandate for the Parliament Act 1911, which would prevent the House of Lords from permanently blocking legislation linked to money bills.

== Candidates ==
Below is a table summarising the candidates of the January 1910 general election in Ireland, excluding those who stood in the University constituency of Dublin University.

Affiliation	Candidates
Irish Parliamentary Party	84
Irish Unionist Party	26
All-for-Ireland League	10
Independent Nationalist	10
Liberal Party	7
Liberal Unionist Party	3 (Note: Candidates stood in North Antrim, South Londonderry and South Tyrone.)
Labour Party	1 (Note: Candidate Robert Gageby stood in Belfast North.)
Independent Unionist	1 (Note: Candidate Thomas Sloan stood in Belfast South.)
Total	142

== Analysis ==
=== Nationalists ===
Amongst the Irish nationalist parties, the Irish Parliamentary Party won 70 seats, of which 57 were uncontested. However, in several seats in which it was contested, it lost. The party saw a decreasing of 11 seats from 81 to 70, although still remained the largest party in Ireland. As the election had resulted in a hung parliament, with the Liberal Party under H. H. Asquith winning the most seats, it relied in the support of the Parliamentary Party in House of Commons.

The newly-formed All-for-Ireland League under the leadership of William O'Brien saw success, particularly in southern seats. The party won 8 seats, which primarily came from the Irish Parliamentary Party, with All-for-Ireland winning 7 seats from the former party; however, Tim Healy of his now defunct Independent Healyite Nationalist grouping, also joined the party and retained his seat as part of All-For-Ireland. It won South Mayo, Mid Cork, North Cork, North East Cork, South East Cork and West Cork, with Tim Healy retaining his seat in a win for the party in North Louth. It also won one of the two seats in Cork City.

A further 10 Independent Nationalist candidates also took seats from the Irish Parliamentary Party, with such candidates winning the seats of South Monaghan, North Westmeath and East Kerry.

=== Unionists and Liberal Unionists ===
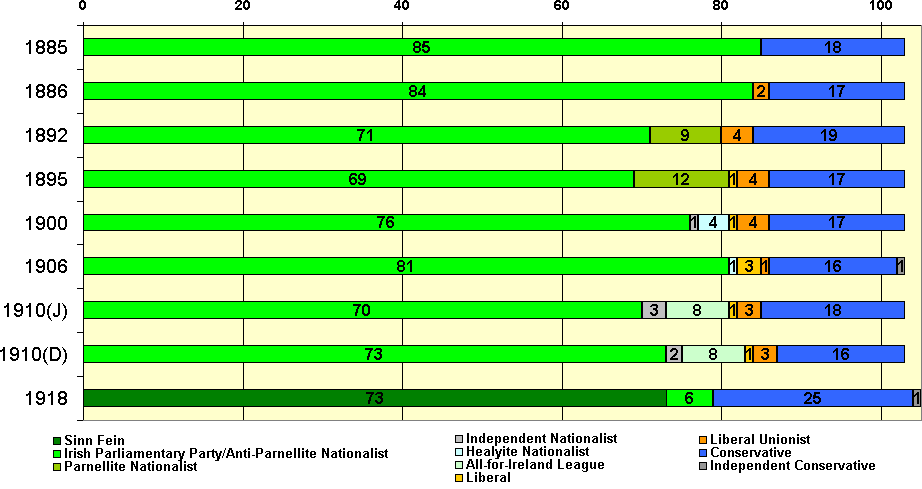
Graph of Irish UK MPs 1885–1918 in numbers

The Irish Unionist Party, led by new leader Edward Carson, in its national affiliation under the Conservative Party Whip, and its parliamentary allies the Liberal Unionist Party gained seats at this election. The wins came primarily from the its losses it suffered from the now defunct Russellite Unionists grouping, which had since joined the Liberal Party following the last election.

The Unionists retained their northern seats of Belfast East, Belfast North, East Antrim, Mid Antrim, South Antrim, Londonderry City, North Londonderry, Mid Armagh, North Armagh, East Down, North Down, West Down and North Fermanagh. It also retained its seat in South Dublin, as well as both its seats in Dublin University unopposed.

It otherwise won Mid Tyrone from the Irish Parliamentary Party. It also won Belfast South from incumbent Independent Unionist Thomas Sloan. The party saw a relatively large swing against it of around 11.2%, owing to several of its incumbents facing election unopposed, like many others in Ireland. Nevertheless, it saw an increase in seats by two, from 16 to 18 seats overall.

Of some confusion is the nature of the division of seats between the Unionists and the Liberal Unionists. These seats were South Londonderry, North Antrim and South Tyrone. The Liberal Unionists retained South Londonderry, with the party winning North Antrim and South Tyrone from the former Russellite Unionists. Brian M. Walker's collations for this election had pointed toward the Liberals Unionists holding no seats at the election, with all seats being held by the Unionists; however, later amended South Londonderry in the appendix to show a Liberal Unionist retain, with the other two seats being Unionist gains. Later research by Liberal Unionist historian Wesley Ferris has subsequently presented that both Andrew Horner in South Tyrone and Peter Kerr-Smiley in North Antrim were, in fact, Liberal Unionists and therefore won the seats for the party.

As such the Liberal Unionist party in fact gained two seats, from holding 1 to holding 3 at this election in Ireland. The party, however, did suffer a drop in vote share by around 3.0%, owing to standing fewer candidates. Overall between the Unionists and Liberal Unionists, the alliance saw a 14.3% drop in vote share, but an overall increase in seats of 4 compared to 1906. The alliance totalled 21 seats out of the 103 in Ireland.

=== Other parties ===
The Liberal Party stood 7 candidates in Ireland, the most since the 1885 general election. Consequently, the Liberal Party saw a swing in its favour of 7.4%, when adjusted for the multi-member constituency calculous. The party retained its single seat in North Tyrone, though with candidate Redmond Barry retaining the seat following the 1907 North Tyrone by-election after former incumbent William Huston Dodd was appointed as a judge.

The Labour Party which had emerged from the Labour Representation Committee, once again stood one candidate in Ireland. Robert Gageby stood in Belfast North (where the party had stood in the previous election), though was unsuccessful.

== County and borough results ==
Party	Leader	Seats					Aggregate votes		
Party	Leader	Total	Gains	Losses	Net	Of total (%)	Total	Of total (%) (Note: Adjusted for multi-member constituencies.)	Change (%)
Irish Parliamentary	John; Redmond	70	0	11	▼11	69.3	78,154	33.4	▲12.4
Irish Unionist	Edward; Carson	16	2	0	▲2	16.8	58,424	27.9	▼11.2
All-for-Ireland	William; O'Brien	8	New		▲8	7.9	27,987	12.7	New
Liberal	H. H. Asquith	1	0	0	Steady	1.0	20,339	9.6	▲7.4
Independent; Nationalist	—N/a	3	3	0	▲3	3.0	17,563	8.0	▲5.1
Liberal Unionist	Joseph; Chamberlain	3 (Note: North Antrim, South Londonderry and South Tyrone.)	2 (Note: North Antrim and South Tyrone.)	0	▲2	3.0	10,558	4.8	▲3.1
Labour	Arthur; Henderson	0	0	0	Steady	—	3,951	1.9	▼1.5
Independent; Unionist	—N/a	0	0	1 (Note: Belfast South.)	▼1	—	3,553	1.7	▼1.6
Other non-contested		0	—N/a		▼3	—	0	0.0	—N/a
Total		101			0	100.0	220,529	100.0	0.0
Registered voters, and turnout							263,463 (Note: Electorate in contested constituencies. The total electorate was 683,767.)	80.3	▼1.8

=== Popular vote ===
Popular vote
IPP	33.4%
Irish Unionist	27.9%
All-for-Ireland	12.7%
Liberal	9.6%
Ind. Nationalist	8.0%
Liberal Unionist	4.8%
Labour	1.9%
Ind. Unionist	1.7%

Popular vote (alliances)
IPP	33.4%
Con-LU	32.7%
All-for-Ireland	12.7%
Liberal	9.6%
Ind. Nationalist	8.0%
Labour	1.9%
Ind. Unionist	1.7%

=== Parliament seats ===
Parliamentary seats
IPP	69.3%
Irish Unionist	16.8%
All-for-Ireland	7.9%
Ind. Nationalist	3.0%
Liberal Unionist	3.0%
Liberal	1.0%

Parliamentary seats (alliances)
IPP	69.3%
Con-LU	19.8%
All-for-Ireland	7.9%
Ind. Nationalist	3.0%
Liberal	1.0%

== Dublin University constituency result ==
January 1910 general election: Dublin University (2 seats)
Party	Candidate	Votes	%	±%
Irish Unionist	Edward Carson	Unopposed		
Irish Unionist	James Campbell	Unopposed		
Irish Unionist hold				
Irish Unionist hold				

== See also ==
- January 1910 United Kingdom general election in England
- January 1910 United Kingdom general election in Scotland
- January 1910 United Kingdom general election in Wales
- List of United Kingdom Parliament constituencies (1885–1918) by region
- History of Ireland (1801–1923)
