= January 1910 United Kingdom general election in Scotland =

- 15 January to 10 February 1910

All 72 Scottish seats to the House of Commons
- Turnout: 84.7% (▲3.8 pp)
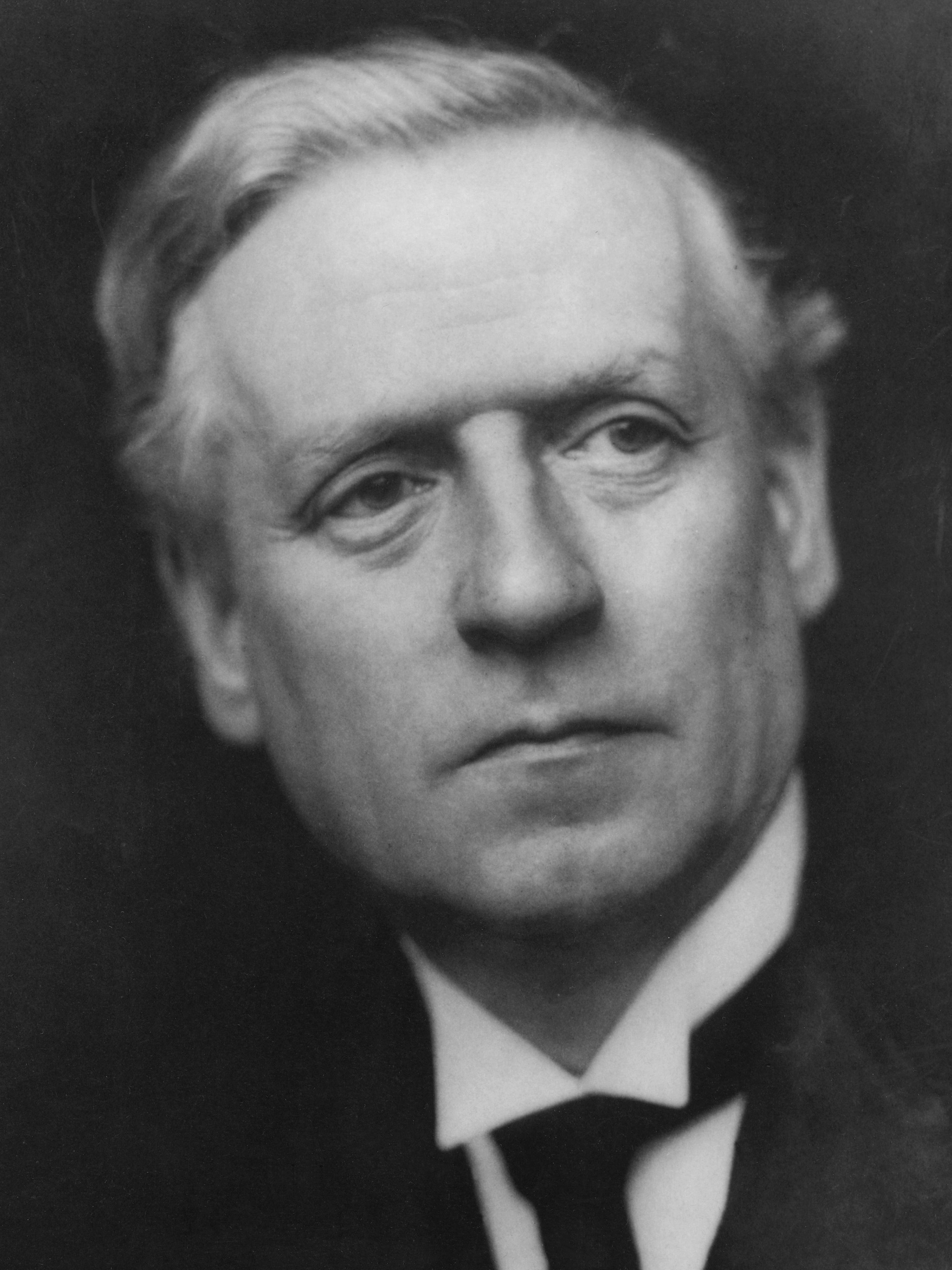

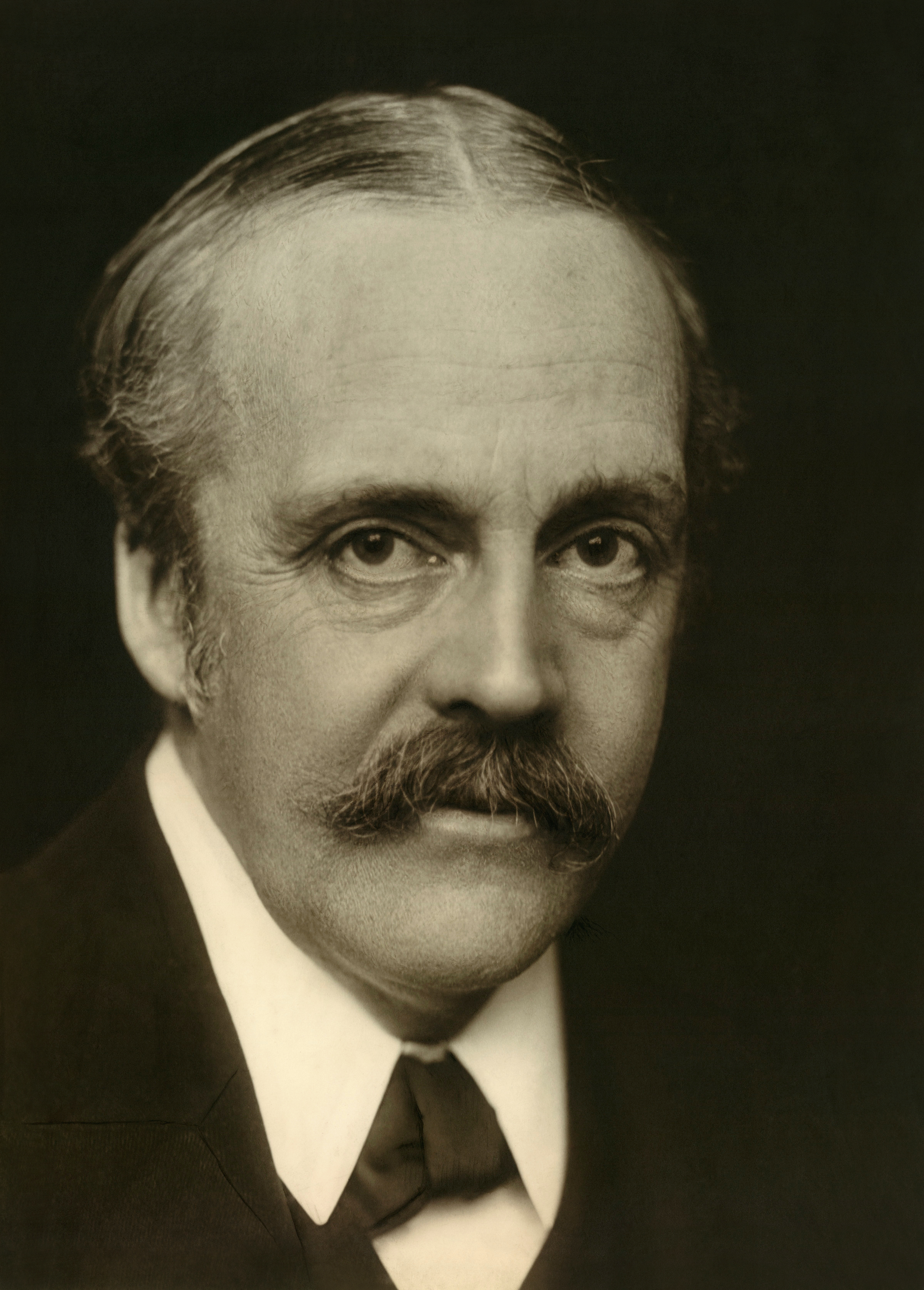

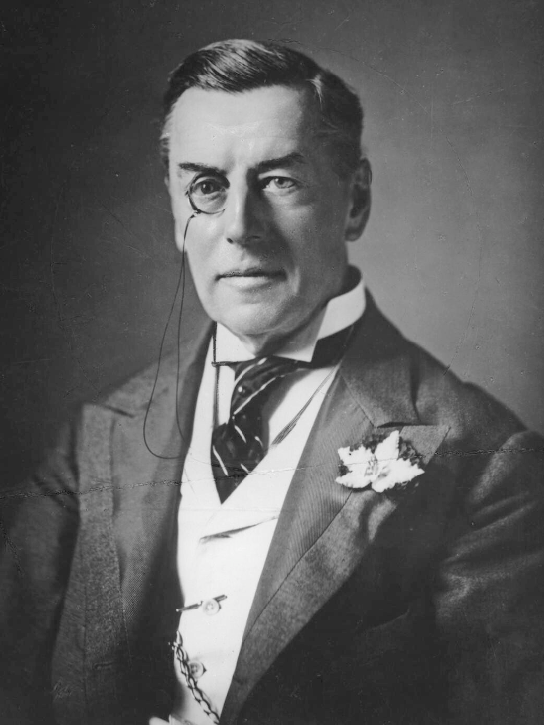

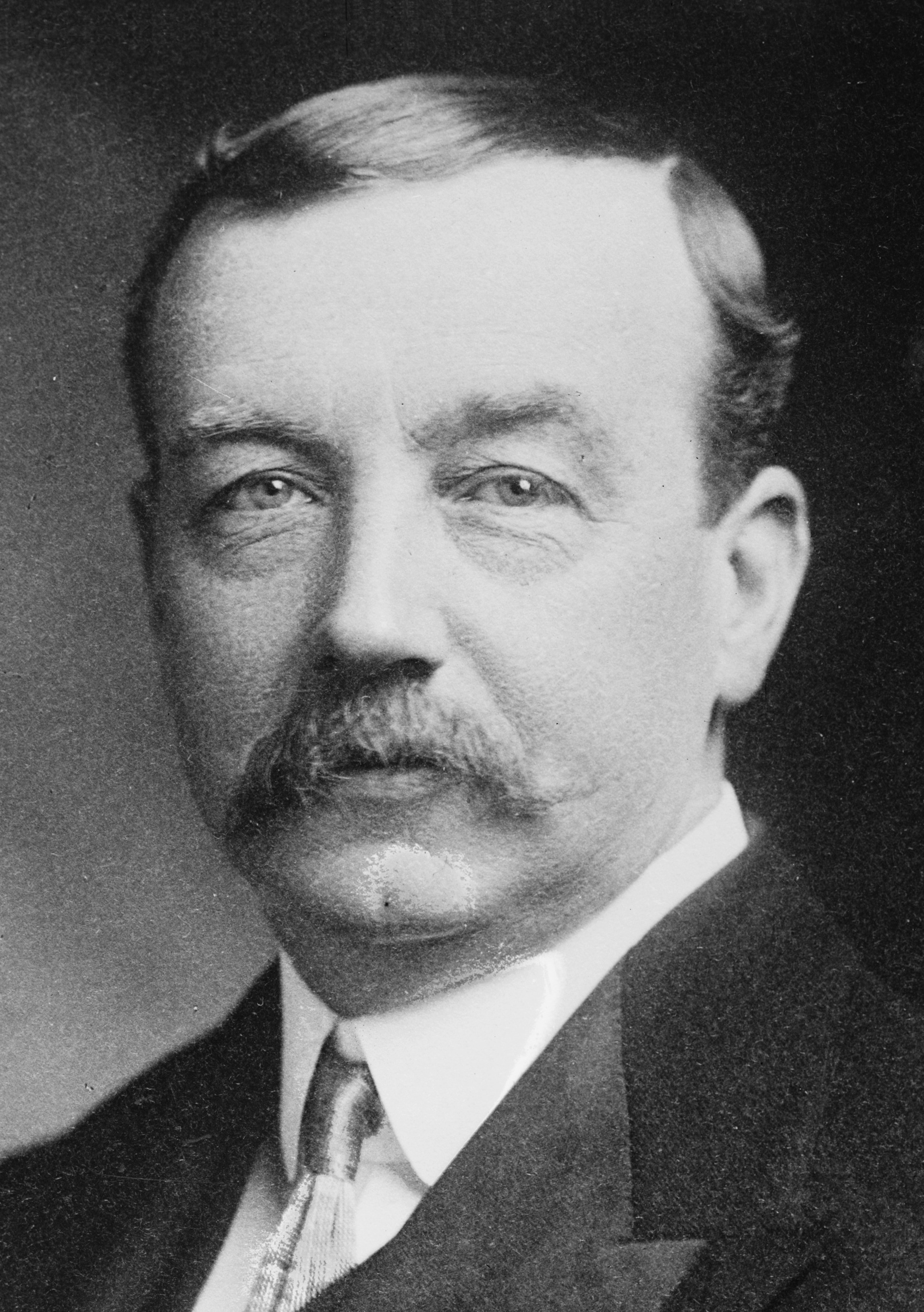
	First party	Second party
Leader	H. H. Asquith	Arthur Balfour
Party	Liberal	Conservative
Alliance	Liberal	Conservative-Liberal Unionist
Leader since	30 April 1908	11 June 1902
Leader's seat	East Fife	City of London
Last election	58 seats, (Note: Combined results for burgh, county and university seats) 56.4%	7 seats, 24.3%
Seats won	58	8
Seat change	Steady	▲1
Popular vote	354,847 (Note: Total and percentage votes given here are for territorial constituencies only)	180,844
Percentage	54.2%	27.6%
Swing	▼2.2 pp	▲3.3 pp
	Third party	Fourth party
Leader	Joseph Chamberlain	Arthur Henderson
Party	Liberal Unionist	Labour
Alliance	Conservative-Liberal Unionist
Leader since	1903	22 January 1908
Leader's seat	Birmingham West	Barnard Castle
Last election	5 seats, 13.9%	2 seats, 2.3%
Seats won	3	2
Seat change	▼2	Steady
Popular vote	79,189	37,852
Percentage	12.0%	5.1%
Swing	▼1.9 pp	▲2.8 pp
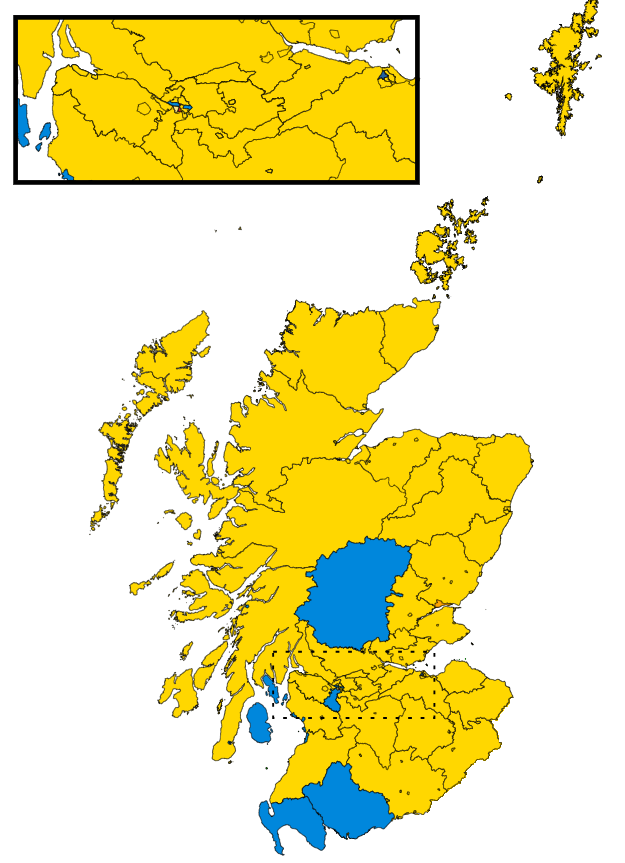
- Results of the January 1910 election in Scotland for the county and burgh seats

From 15 January to 10 February 1910, the January 1910 United Kingdom general election was held in the United Kingdom, and members were returned for all 72 seats in Scotland. Scotland was allocated 72 seats in total, with 70 territorial seats, comprising 32 burgh constituencies and 37 county constituencies. (Note: One burgh seat, Dundee, was represented by two members of parliament.) There were also two university constituencies, Glasgow and Aberdeen Universities and Edinburgh and St Andrews Universities.

The election was called amid a constitutional crisis after the Conservative-dominated House of Lords rejected the People's Budget. The Liberal government, sought a dissolution of parliament for the election seeking a mandate, however lost their majority. It was the second of two general elections held during the reign of King Edward VII, due to his death in May 1910.

The election resulted in a hung parliament in which the Conservative Party, along with its long-time ally, the Liberal Unionist Party won the most votes, but with the Liberal Party under H. H. Asquith won the most seats. Another election followed in December as the Liberal government sought a mandate for the Parliament Act 1911, which would prevent the House of Lords from permanently blocking legislation linked to money bills.

== Candidates ==
Below is a table summarising the candidates of the January 1910 general election in Scotland, excluding those in the university constituencies.

Affiliation	Candidates
Scottish Liberal Party	68
Conservative Party	48
Liberal Unionist Party	22
Labour Party	10
Independent Labour Party	1 (Note: Candidate Joseph Burgess stood in Montrose Burghs.)
Social Democratic Federation	1 (Note: Candidate Tom Kennedy stood in Aberdeen North.)
Independent Liberal	1 (Note: Candidate Archibald Corbett stood in Glasgow Tradeston.)
Scottish Prohibition Party	1 (Note: Candidate Edwin Scrymgeour stood in Dundee.)
Total	152

== Analysis ==
In Scotland the election saw little change from the 1906 election, being a second landslide for the Liberal government, which took 58 of the 72 seats. However when combined with results from across the United Kingdom, the election resulted in a hung parliament: Arthur Balfour’s Conservatives and their Liberal Unionist allies won the most votes, but Asquith’s Liberals secured the most seats, edging out the Conservatives by two. With Irish Parliamentary Party support, Asquith remained in power.

=== Liberal Party ===
Winston Churchill

In Scotland the opposition Liberals under Henry Campbell-Bannerman won a crushing victory, winning 54.2% of vote and 58 out of Scotland's 72 seats. The party saw no overall change in terms of seats. The figure of 56.4% has not been surpassed by any single party in any election since, although the coalition of parties forming the National Government would secure 64.0% at the 1931 election.

Notably, Liberal, and future Deputy Leader of the National Liberal Party and subsequent Conservative Prime Minister Winston Churchill contested his first general election within a Scottish seat (having previously done so in England). Churchill entered the seat of Dundee at the 1908 Dundee by-election as a winning Liberal candidate. His retention at this election was a hold for the Liberal Party. Churchill would hold the seat until the 1922 general election.

=== Conservatives and Liberal Unionists ===
The Conservative Party, which was in an alliance with the Liberal Unionist Party in Parliament and at the constituency level, saw a heavy drop in seats at the election. With the Conservative Party standing 48 candidates, more than it stood than at the previous election, it took around 27.6% of the vote, an increase of 3.3%. The party held the university constituency seat of Glasgow and Aberdeen Universities. It also held the county and borough seats of Ayr Burghs and Wigtownshire.

The party gained West Perthshire, East Renfrewshire, Buteshire, Glasgow Central and Kirkcudbright Stewartry. However, it lost Wick Burghs, Glasgow Govan and North West Lanarkshire to the Liberals. Additionally, within its alliance with the Liberal Unionists, the Conservatives technically lost Edinburgh and St Andrews Universities to the latter party. Conservative incumbent John Batty Tuke retired from Parliament, with Liberal Unionist Robert Finlay taking the seat. Finlay thereby re-entered Parliament after having lost his seat of Inverness Burghs in 1906.

The Liberal Unionist Party won around 12.0% of the vote, a small 1.9% drop in terms of vote share, with the party standing 22 candidates in Scotland which was fewer than in the previous election. The Liberal Unionists retained the seats of Glasgow Camlachie and Edinburgh West. However, the party suffered losses. It lost St Andrews Burghs and North Ayrshire to the Liberal Party. Additionally, Archibald Corbett retained his seat of Glasgow Tradeston sitting as an Independent Liberal. As he was previously a Liberal Unionist MP, his retention represented a loss for the Liberal Unionists. These losses were only set-off by the gain from the Conservatives in Edinburgh and St Andrews Universities.

Overall, the Conservatives saw 5 gains, but 4 losses, with an overall increase of 1 seat in Scotland at this election. The Liberal Unionists gained 1 seat but lost 3, with a decrease of 2 seats. The alliance between the two parties held at the election a total of 11 MPs in Scotland, with a combined vote share of 39.6%.

=== Labour Party ===
The Labour Party under new leader, Arthur Henderson, saw no overall change in seats at this election. It retained Glasgow Blackfriars and Hutchesontown, wherein George Barnes was the MP. Alexander Wilkie retained one of the two seats in Dundee. The party did stand more candidates than in the previous election, and consequently took a vote share of 5.3%, an increase by 2.8%.

== Seats summary ==
Below is a table summarising the total number of seats, gains and losses for each party in both the territorial county and burgh constituencies and the university constituencies.

Party	Seats				
Party	Total	Gains	Losses	Net	Of all (%)
Liberal	58	5	5	Steady	80.6
Conservative-Liberal Unionist	11	6	7	▼1	15.3
Conservative	8	5	4	▲1	11.1
Liberal Unionist	3	1	3	▼2	4.2
Labour	2	0	0	Steady	2.8
Independent Liberal	1	Did not stand in 1906		▲1	1.4
Total	72				

== County and burgh results ==
Party	Seats					Aggregate votes		
Party	Total	Gains	Losses	Net	Of total (%)	Total	Of total (%) (Note: Adjusted for multi-member constituencies.)	Change (%)
Liberal	58	5	5	Steady	82.9	354,847	54.2	▼2.2
Conservative-Liberal Unionist	9	5	6	▼1	12.9	260,033	39.6	▲1.4
Conservative	7	5	3	▲2	10.0	180,844	27.6	▲3.3
Liberal Unionist	2	0	3	▼3	2.9	79,189	12.0	▼1.9
Labour	2	0	0	Steady	2.9	37,852	5.1	▲2.8
Independent Liberal	1	Did not stand in 1906		▲1	1.4	2,966	0.5	—N/a
Ind. Labour Party	0	Did not stand in 1906			—	1,888	0.3	—N/a
Scottish Prohibition	0	New			—	1,512	0.1	New
Social Democratic Federation	0	0	0	Steady	—	1,344	0.2	▼0.1
Total	70			0	100.0	660,442	100.0	0.0
Registered voters, and turnout						762,184 (Note: Electorate in contested constituencies, which was all seats in this election.)	84.7	▲3.8

=== Popular vote ===
Popular vote
Liberal	54.2%
Conservative	27.6%
Liberal Unionist	12.0%
Labour	5.1%
Other	1.1%

Popular vote (alliances)
Liberal	54.2%
Con-LU	39.6%
Labour	5.1%
Other	1.1%

=== Parliament seats ===
Parliamentary seats
Liberal	80.6%
Conservative	11.1%
Liberal Unionist	4.2%
Labour	2.8%
Ind. Liberal	1.4%

Parliamentary seats (alliances)
Liberal	80.6%
Con-LU	15.2%
Labour	2.8%
Ind. Liberal	1.4%

== University constituency results ==
The two university constituencies each elected an additional member to the house.

=== Edinburgh and St Andrews Universities ===
General election January 1910: Edinburgh and St Andrews Universities
Party	Candidate	Votes	%	±%
Liberal Unionist	Robert Finlay	5,205	65.9	▼2.0
Liberal	Alexander Russell Simpson	2,693	34.1	N/A
Majority		2,512	31.8	▼4.0
Turnout		7,898	69.8	▲5.1
Registered electors		11,319		
Liberal Unionist gain from Conservative		Swing	N/A	

=== Glasgow and Aberdeen Universities ===
General election January 1910: Glasgow and Aberdeen Universities
Party	Candidate	Votes	%	±%
Conservative	Henry Craik	4,879	58.9	▲9.9
Free Trader	Frederick Pollock	3,411	41.1	▲24.0
Majority		1,468	17.8	▲2.7
Turnout		8,290	70.8	▲2.2
Registered electors		11,705		
Conservative hold		Swing	▼7.1	

== See also ==
- January 1910 United Kingdom general election in England
- January 1910 United Kingdom general election in Ireland
- January 1910 United Kingdom general election in Wales
- List of United Kingdom Parliament constituencies (1885–1918) by region
