= January 1910 United Kingdom general election =

- 15 January – 10 February 1910

All 670 seats in the House of Commons 336 seats needed for a majority
- Registered: 7,694,741
- Turnout: 6,667,400; 86.8% (▲3.6 pp)
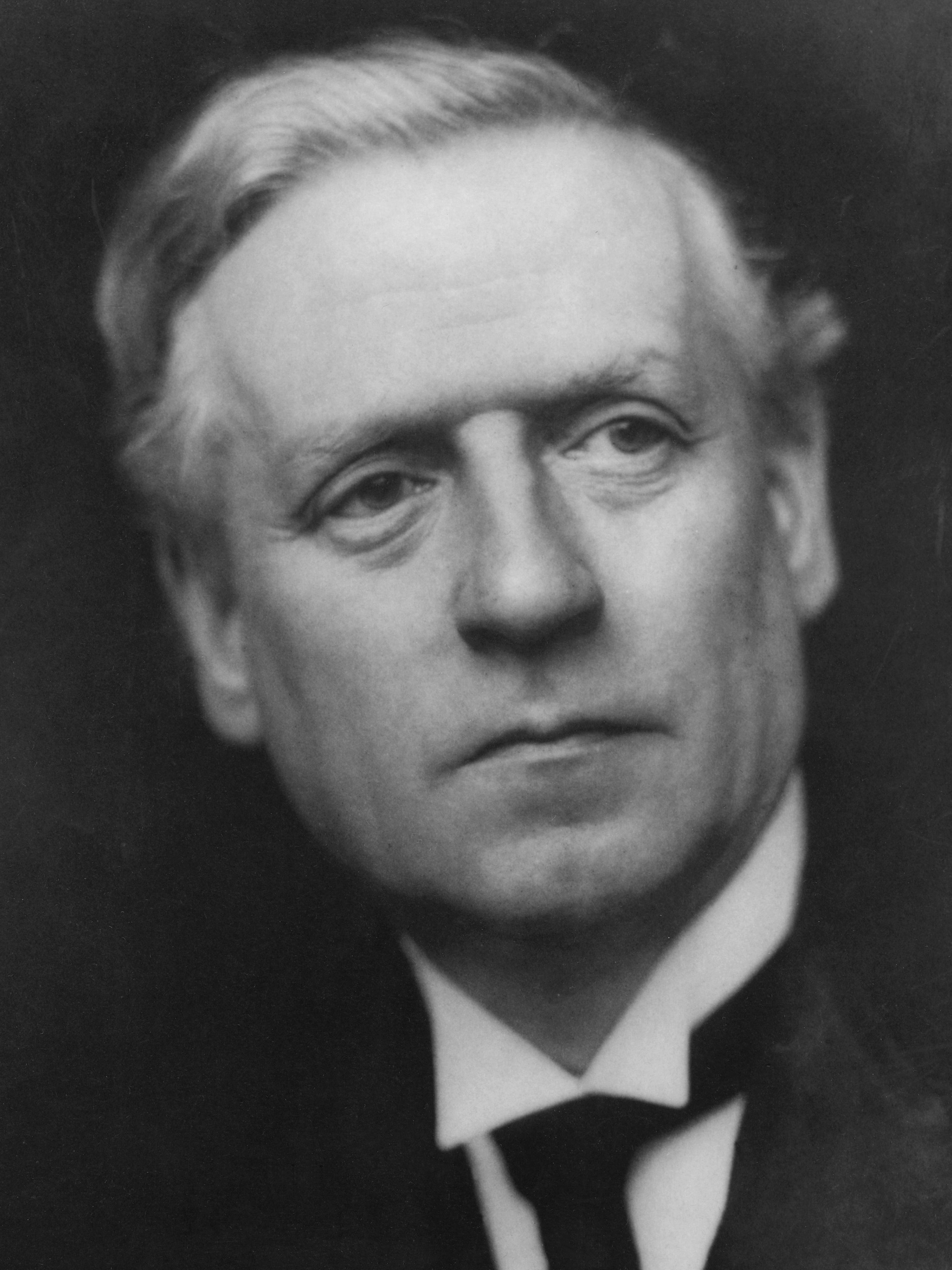

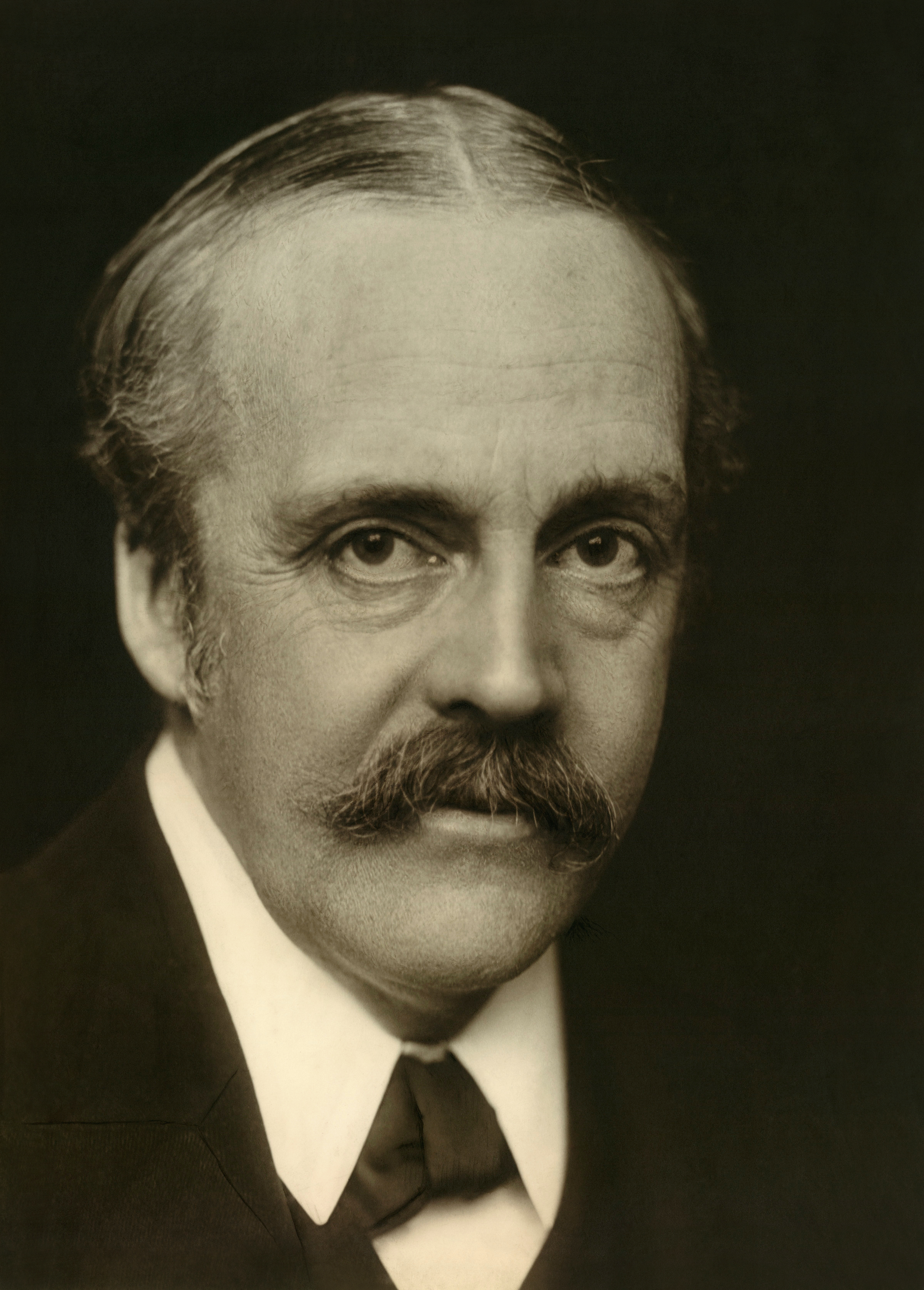

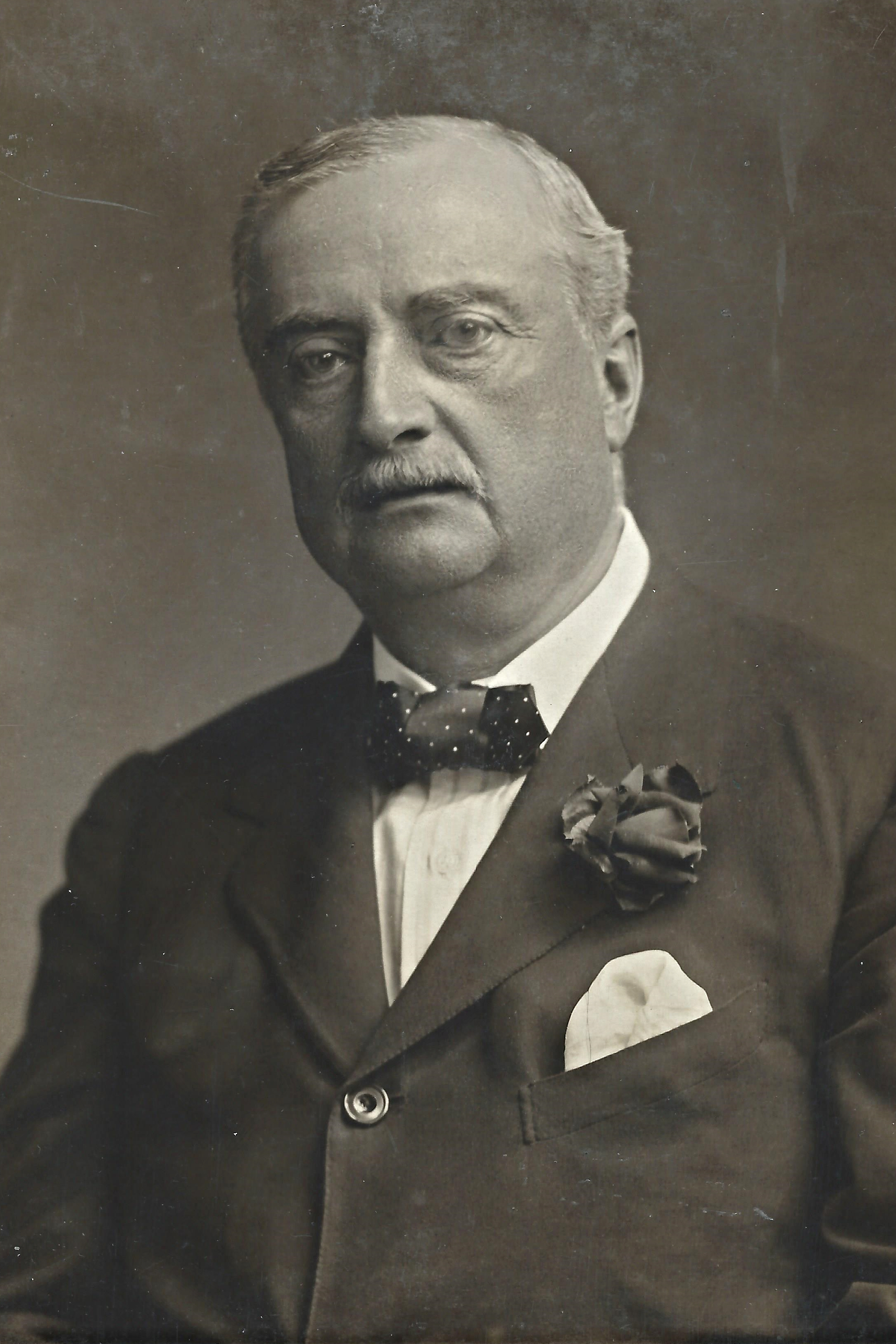

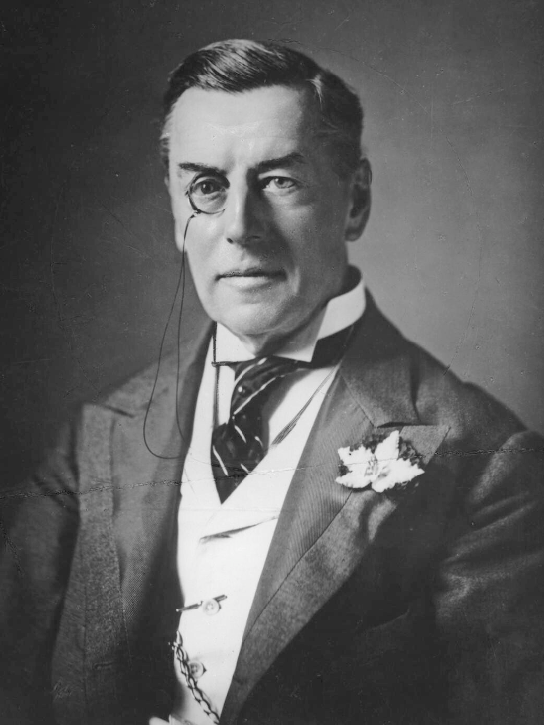

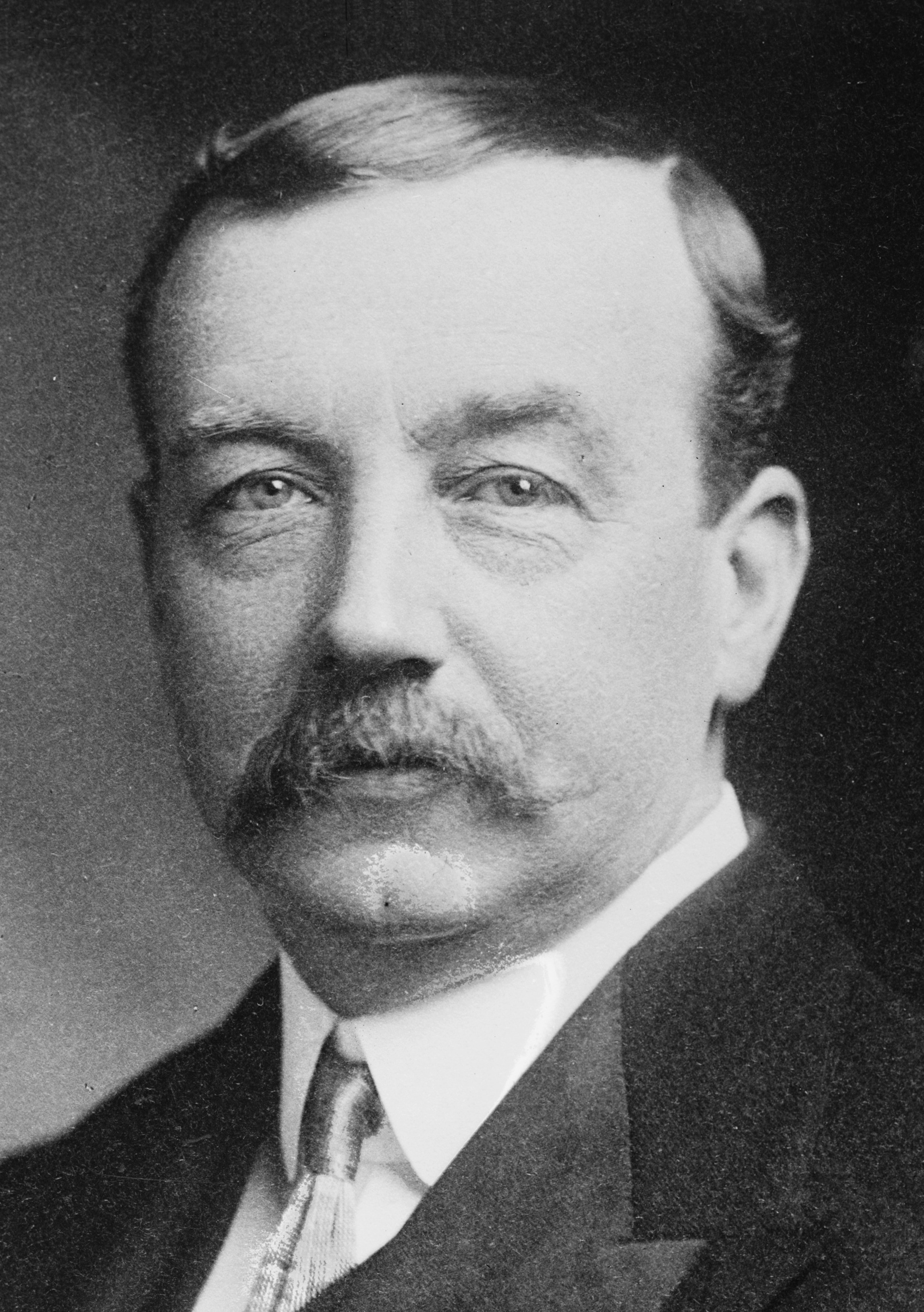

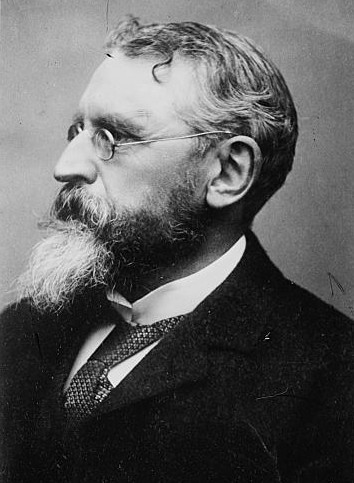
	First party	Second party	Third party
Leader	H. H. Asquith	Arthur Balfour	John Redmond
Party	Liberal	Conservative	Irish Parliamentary
Alliance		Conservative-Liberal Unionist
Leader since	30 April 1908	11 June 1902	6 February 1900
Leader's seat	East Fife	City of London	Waterford City
Last election	397 seats, 48.9%	130 seats, 36.1%	82 seats, 0.6%
Seats won	274	229 (Note: Figure includes Speaker of the House of Commons James Lowther in Penrith.)	71
Seat change	▼123	▲99	▼11
Popular vote	2,866,157	2,611,934	81,097
Percentage	43.5%	39.4%	1.2%
Swing	▼5.4 pp	▲3.3 pp	▲0.6 pp
	Fourth party	Fifth party	Sixth party
Leader	Joseph Chamberlain	Arthur Henderson	William O'Brien
Party	Liberal Unionist	Labour	All-for-Ireland
Alliance	Conservative-Liberal Unionist
Leader since	1903	22 January 1908	March 1909
Leader's seat	Birmingham West	Barnard Castle	North East Cork
Last election	26 seats, 7.3%	29 seats, 4.8%	Did not contest
Seats won	43	40	8
Seat change	▲17	▲11	▲8
Popular vote	492,473	505,657	27,987
Percentage	7.4%	7.0%	0.4%
Swing	▲0.1 pp	▲2.2 pp	New party
- Colours denote the winning party

- Composition of the House of Commons following the election.
Prime Minister before election
H. H. Asquith
Liberal
Prime Minister after election
H. H. Asquith
Liberal

The January 1910 United Kingdom general election was held from 15 January to 10 February 1910 to elect all 670 members of the House of Commons. Called amid a constitutional crisis after the Conservative-dominated House of Lords rejected the People's Budget, the Liberal government, seeking a mandate, lost their majority.

The result was a hung parliament: Arthur Balfour’s Conservatives and their Liberal Unionist allies won the most votes, but Asquith’s Liberals secured the most seats, edging out the Conservatives by two. With Irish Parliamentary Party support, Asquith remained in power. Another election followed in December.

The Labour Party, led by Arthur Henderson, returned 40 MPs. Much of this apparent increase (from the 29 Labour MPs elected in 1906) came from the defection, a few years earlier, of Lib Lab MPs from the Liberal Party to Labour.

== Electoral system ==
Most of the MPs were elected through first-past-the-post voting in single-member districts. Conversely, 54 MPs were elected in two-seat districts by the use of plurality block voting, where each voter could cast up to two votes.

== Candidates ==
Below is a table summarising the candidates of the January 1910 general election.

Affiliation	Candidates
Liberal Party	511 (Note: Includes 15 Liberal-Labour candidates.)
Conservative Party	465
Liberal Unionist Party	101
Irish Parliamentary Party	85
Labour Party	78
Irish Unionist Party	28
All-for-Ireland League	10
Independent Nationalist	10
Social Democratic Federation	9
Free Trader	4 (Note: The candidates that stood were George Bethell in Holderness, Sir Charles Seely in Lincoln, Harold Cox in Preston and Sir Frederick Pollock in Glasgow and Aberdeen Universities.)
Independent Liberal	3 (Note: The candidates that stood were Edwin Jellicoe stood in Liverpool Walton, Archibald Corbett in Glasgow Tradeston and William Pritchard-Morgan in Merthyr Tydfil.)
Independent Labour	3 (Note: The candidates that stood were William Gee in Ashton-under-Lyne, A. A. Purcell in Salford West and Ben Tillett in Swansea Town.)
Independent Conservative	2 (Note: The candidates that stood were Francis Bennett-Goldney in Canterbury and Richard Jebb in Marylebone East.)
Colne Valley Labour Union	1 (Note: Candidate Victor Grayson stood in Colne Valley.)
Independent Labour Party	1 (Note: Candidate Joseph Burgess stood in Montrose Burghs.)
Independent Unionist	1 (Note: Candidate Thomas Sloan stood in Belfast South.)
Independent Tariff Reform	1 (Note: Candidate Samuel Storey stood in Sunderland.)
Women's Suffrage	1 (Note: Candidate Arthur Bulley stood in Rossendale.)
Scottish Prohibition Party	1 (Note: Candidate Edwin Scrymgeour stood in Dundee.)
Total	1,315

== Outcome ==
=== Liberal Party ===
The Liberal Party under leader H. H. Asquith saw a severe drop in seats from its high 306 seat count at the previous election. In terms of vote share, the party took 43.5% of the vote, a decrease of 5.4% when compared to the previous election. The party won Hoxton, Darwen and Stockton-on-Tees and one of the two seats in Blackburn from the Conservatives, as well as Great Grimsby, Darlington and South East Durham from the Liberal Unionist Party. It therefore won 7 seats, but with 125 other losses across England to other parties, the party fell to 188 seats in total.

In Scotland, the election saw little change from the 1906 election, being a second landslide for the Liberal government, which took 58 of the 72 seats. Notably, Liberal and future Deputy Leader of the National Liberal Party and subsequent Conservative Prime Minister Winston Churchill contested his first general election within a Scottish seat (having previously done so in England). Churchill entered the seat of Dundee at the 1908 Dundee by-election as a winning Liberal candidate. His retention at this election was a hold for the Liberal Party. Churchill would hold the seat until the 1922 general election.

In Wales, The Liberal Party retained the seats of Anglesey, Arfon, Eifion, East Denbighshire, Flint Boroughs, Flintshire, Merioneth, Montgomeryshire, Breconshire, Cardiganshire, Carmarthen Boroughs, East Carmarthenshire, West Carmarthenshire, West Denbighshire, Pembrokeshire, Caernarfon, East Glamorganshire, Mid Glamorganshire, Cardiff, Swansea Town, Swansea District, Monmouth Boroughs, South Monmouthshire, Montgomery, Pembroke and Haverfordwest and North Monmouthshire. The party also held one of the two seats in the two-member constituency of Merthyr Tydfil. However, it lost seats primarily to the Labour Party by way of the majority of its union-sponsored candidates joining the Labour Party and standing as such at this election, losing three seats to Labour along with two to the Conservative Party. However, it still maintained its dominant position in Wales.

The Liberal Party stood 7 candidates in Ireland, the most since the 1885 general election. Consequently, the Liberal Party saw a swing in its favour of 7.4%, when adjusted for the multi-member constituency calculous. The party retained its single seat in North Tyrone, though with candidate Redmond Barry retaining the seat following the 1907 North Tyrone by-election after former incumbent William Huston Dodd was appointed as a judge.

Within the Liberal Party, several Liberal-Labour MPs that held their seats, with several who had won or kept their seats from the previous election defecting directly to the Labour Party, some of which were successful again their former party while others were defeated by Liberal candidates. Such remaining Liberal-Labour members within the Liberal Party were those in Battersea, St Pancras East, Stoke-upon-Trent, Salford North, Birkenhead, Mid Durham, Morpeth and Wansbeck. As such, 8 seats were held by Liberal-Labour MPs.

=== Conservative Party ===
The Conservative Party, led by Arthur Balfour, saw a significant recovery from the previous election, with the party increasing its vote share by 3.3% to 39.4%. In England, the party also recovered in terms of seats, with the party gaining net of 94 seats, with 100 gains and 6 losses. Leader of the Conservative Party Arthur Balfour, who had lost his seat at the last election, re-entered Parliament in City of London at the February 1906 City of London by-election. He retained his seat at this election with an increased vote share. The party gained a net of 100 seats alone in England. However, it lost Hoxton, Darwen and Stockton-on-Tees to the Liberal Party, as well as one of the two seats in Blackburn to the Liberals. It also lost Wigan to Labour, and internally to the Liberal Unionists, it lost St George's, Hannover Square. One notable politician to face his first general election was future Prime Minister Stanley Baldwin, who entered Parliament at the 1908 Bewdley by-election following the death of his father and incumbent MP Alfred Baldwin. Baldwin retained the seat for the Conservatives at this election with over 70.0% of the vote.

In Scotland, the party held the university constituency seat of Glasgow and Aberdeen Universities. It also held the county and borough seats of Ayr Burghs and Wigtownshire. The party gained West Perthshire, East Renfrewshire, Buteshire, Glasgow Central and Kirkcudbright Stewartry. However, it lost Wick Burghs, Glasgow Govan and North West Lanarkshire to the Liberals. Additionally, within its alliance with the Liberal Unionists, the Conservatives technically lost Edinburgh and St Andrews Universities to the latter party. Conservative incumbent John Batty Tuke retired from Parliament, with Liberal Unionist Robert Finlay taking the seat. Finlay thereby re-entered Parliament after having lost his seat of Inverness Burghs in 1906.

In Wales, the Conservatives made gains in seats, with candidate Charles Dillwyn-Venables-Llewelyn winning Radnorshire from the Liberal Party. Additionally, it won Denbigh Boroughs from Liberal-Labour MP Clement Edwards. Edwards had remained loyal to the Liberal Party and remained standing as a joint candidate with a union unlike other Liberal-Labour candidates at this election, who had largely defected to stand as Labour candidates. As such, the Conservative Party regained two seats and therefore its representation in Wales compared to the last election.

The Irish Unionist Party, led by new leader Edward Carson, in its national affiliation under the Conservative Party Whip, also gained seats at this election. The wins came primarily from the losses it suffered from the now defunct Russellite Unionists grouping, which had since joined the Liberal Party following the last election. The Unionists retained their northern seats of Belfast East, Belfast North, East Antrim, Mid Antrim, South Antrim, Londonderry City, North Londonderry, Mid Armagh, North Armagh, East Down, North Down, West Down and North Fermanagh. It also retained its seats in South Dublin, as well as both its seats in Dublin University unopposed. It otherwise won Mid Tyrone from the Irish Parliamentary Party. It also won Belfast South from incumbent Independent Unionist Thomas Sloan. The party saw a relatively large swing against it of around 11.2%, owing to several of its incumbents facing election unopposed, like many others in Ireland. Nevertheless, it saw an increase in seats by two, from 16 to 18 seats overall.

Outside of the official party, Independent Conservative Samuel Storey, who stood under the label of Independent Tariff Reform, won one of the two seats in Sunderland, with the Conservatives taking the other. Storey's win was a gain from the Liberal Party.

=== Liberal Unionist Party ===
The Liberal Unionist Party, led by Joseph Chamberlain also saw a significant recovery at this election, although only seeing a 0.1% increase in vote to 7.4% of the vote. The party retained Totnes, Aylesbury, Ludlow, Burton, Handsworth, East Worcestershire, West Derbyshire and Durham. The party may have retained the seat of North Lonsdale. Seminal collations classed George Haddock as a holding Conservative; however, subsequent research on Haddock's candidature placed him instead as a Liberal Unionist, with the party thereby retaining the seat.

It also retained its university constituency seats in London University and Oxford University. It also held its metropolitan Birmingham seats of Birmingham Bordesley, Birmingham Central, Birmingham North, Birmingham South and Birmingham West. The party gained East Somerset, Cricklade, Mile End, St Pancras South, Mid Norfolk, West Staffordshire, Ross, Droitwich, Manchester South West. It also gained one of the two seats in Portsmouth. Of some dispute is the nature of further gains, as to whether they were gains for the Conservative Party or the Liberal Unionists. Seminal collations of the seat counts present 10 of the collective gains for the alliance as a Conservative gains , however, subsequent research into the candidates suggested that each candidate under the already relatively merged Conservative and Liberal Unionist local organisations were, in fact, Liberal Unionists. As such the Liberal Unionists also gained Maldon, Hitchin, Watford, Chertsey, Guildford, Paddington North, Cambridge, Cheltenham, Penryn and Falmouth, and Walsall from the Liberal Party, with each becoming Liberal Unionist MPs rather than winning Conservatives.

Furthermore, in exchange with the allied Conservatives, the Liberal Unionists gained Westminster St George's, Hannover Square from the Conservative Party, with Alfred Lyttelton retaining the seat following the 1906 St George's, Hanover Square by-election after the Conservative incumbent MP Heneage Legge resigned from government and Parliament. However, it lost Croydon. Following the death of incumbent Liberal Unionist MP, Hugh Oakeley Arnold-Forster, the Conservative Party won the seat at the 1909 Croydon by-election. It was a gain at this election through the retention of the Conservatives from its ally, although the Liberal Unionist did not stand against the Conservativs. It also lost Great Grimsby, Darlington and South East Durham to the Liberal Party. As such, with 21 gains and 4 losses, the Liberal Unionists increased it seat count to 37 in England, rather than older estimate which placed that party as holding 26 seats.

In Scotland, the Liberal Unionists retained the seats of Glasgow Camlachie and Edinburgh West. However, the party suffered losses. It lost St Andrews Burghs and North Ayrshire to the Liberal Party. Additionally, Archibald Corbett retained his seat of Glasgow Tradeston sitting as an Independent Liberal. As he was previously a Liberal Unionist MP, his retention represented a loss for the Liberal Unionists. These losses were only set-off by the gain from the Conservatives in Edinburgh and St Andrews Universities. The Liberal Unionist Party only stood one candidate in Wales. This was Viscount Tiverton, who stood in Carmarthen Boroughs. However, although taking 31.9% of the vote in the seat, he was unsuccessful.

Finally, the Liberal Unionists made gains in Ireland. Of some confusion is the nature of the division of seats between the Unionists and the Liberal Unionists. These seats were South Londonderry, North Antrim and South Tyrone. The Liberal Unionists retained South Londonderry, with the party winning North Antrim and South Tyrone from the former Russellite Unionists. Brian M. Walker's collations for this election had pointed toward the Liberals Unionists holding no seats at the election, with all seats being held by the Unionists; however, later amended South Londonderry in the appendix to show a Liberal Unionist retain, with the other two seats being Unionist gains. Later research by Liberal Unionist historian Wesley Ferris has subsequently presented that both Andrew Horner in South Tyrone and Peter Kerr-Smiley in North Antrim were, in fact, Liberal Unionists and therefore won the seats for the party. As such the Liberal Unionist party in fact gained two seats, to holding 3 at this election in Ireland.

=== Labour Party ===
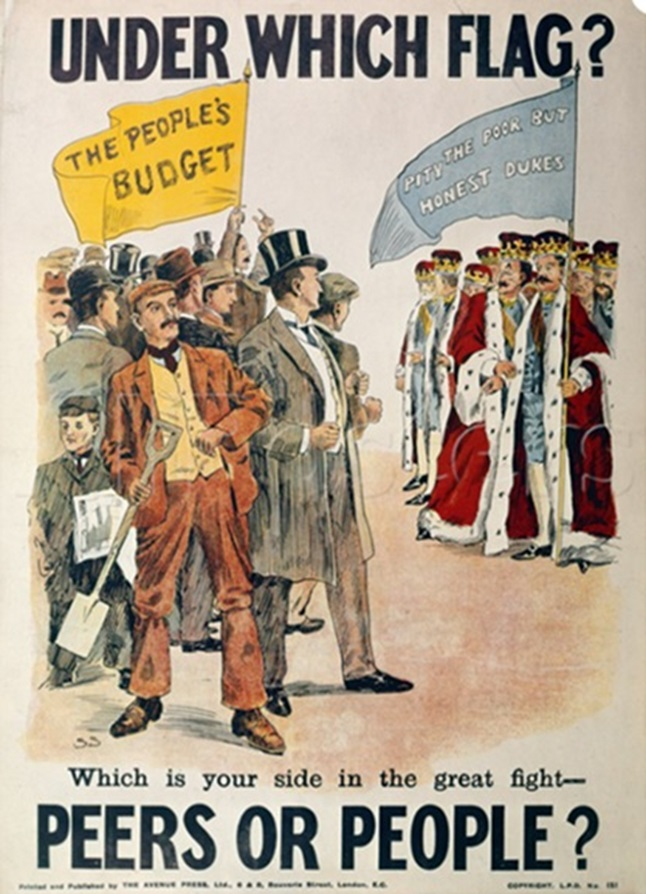
Election poster from "Labour Party and Democratic League" (a faction of the British Labour Party)

The Labour Party which had emerged from the Labour Representation Committee following the last election, increased its number of seats as well as seeing a rise in vote share to 6.9% in England. The party retained its seats of Deptford, West Ham South, Barrow and Furness, Clitheroe, Gorton, Ince, Manchester North East, Newton, St Helens, Westhoughton, Barnard Castle, Bradford West and Leeds East. It also held one of the two seats in Norwich, Leicester, Blackburn, Bolton, Stockport, Newcastle-upon-Tyne and Halifax.

Many of its gains at this election came from the phenomena of several Liberal-sponsored Liberal-Labour incumbents MPs defecting fully to the Labour Party, and retaining their seats, which were gains from the Liberal to Labour. Labour won Hanley from the Liberal Party, with sitting Liberal-Labour MP Enoch Edwards defecting to Labour, and winning his seat from the Liberals. Similarly, in Nuneaton, sitting Liberal-Labour faction MP William Johnson defected to Labour and retained his seat again the Liberals, with James Haslam in Chesterfield, John Wadsworth in Hallamshire and Frederick Hall in Normanton doing the same.

Labour gained North West Staffordshire, Mid Derbyshire, North East Derbyshire, Manchester East and Sheffield Attercliffe directly from the Liberal Party. It gained Wigan from the Conservatives. It also won one of the two seats in Derby from the Liberals. In the seat of Chester-le-Street, John Wilkinson Taylor was elected as an Independent Labour MP, but had joined the Labour Party officially, and stood for it successfully as this election. This represented a further gain for Labour. However, the party lost Chatham, Woolwich, Wolverhampton West, one the two seats in Preston, and one of the two seats in Sunderland to the Conservative Party. It also lost Manchester South West to the Liberal Unionists. With 13 gains and 6 losses, the Labour Party saw it representation in England rise to a total of 33 seats.

In Wales, it stood 5 candidates. The now former leader of the Labour Party, Keir Hardie, retained his seat, being one of the two in Merthyr Tydfil. The rest of Labour's candidates in Wales also came from former Liberal-Labour candidates. These were William Abraham in Rhondda, William Brace in South Glamorganshire, Thomas Richards in West Monmouthshire. Former Independent Liberal-Labor MP, John Williams in Gower, who had stood against the Liberal Party at the last election, but who then had since joined the Liberal Party following the 1906 election, had defected to the Labour Party following its formation. He once again stood in the seat and won it as a Labour candidate.

In Scotland, Labour Party saw no overall change in seats at this election. It retained Glasgow Blackfriars and Hutchesontown, wherein George Barnes was the MP. Alexander Wilkie retained one of the two seats in Dundee. The party did stand more candidates than in the previous election, and consequently took a vote share of 5.3%, an increase by 2.8%.

It once again stood one candidate in Ireland. Robert Gageby stood in Belfast North (where the party had stood in the previous election), though was unsuccessful.

=== Irish Nationalists ===
Amongst the Irish nationalist parties, the Irish Parliamentary Party won 70 seats, of which 57 were uncontested. However, in several seats in which it was contested, it lost. The party saw a decreased of 11 seats from 81 to 70, although still remained the largest party in Ireland. Additionally, in England, T. P. O'Connor held in Liverpool Scotland, bringing the number to 71 MPs.

The newly-formed All-for-Ireland League under the leadership of William O'Brien saw success, particularly in southern seats. The party won 8 seats, which primarily came from the Irish Parliamentary Party, with All-for-Ireland winning 7 seats from the former party; however, Tim Healy of his now defunct Independent Healyite Nationalist grouping, also joined the party and retained his seat as part of All-For-Ireland. It won South Mayo, Mid Cork, North Cork, North East Cork, South East Cork and West Cork, with Tim Healy retaining his seat but in a win for the party in North Louth. It also won one of the two seats in Cork City.

A further 10 Independent Nationalist candidates also took seats from the Irish Parliamentary Party, with such candidates winning the seats of South Monaghan, North Westmeath and East Kerry.

== Results ==
The following tables are based on the collations of seats and votes collected by F. W. S. Craig for the results in Great Britain, and seats and votes collected by Brian Mercer Walker for Ireland. The distinctions made between the Conservatives, Irish Unionists and Liberal Unionists in alterations to these works are set out according to Wesley Ferris.

=== Summary of seats returned ===
Party	Leader	MPs		Aggregate votes	
Party	Leader		Of total		Of total (Note: Adjusted for multi-member constituencies.)
Liberal Party	H. H. Asquith	274 (Note: Includes 8 Liberal-Labour MPs.)	40.9%	2,866,157	43.5%
Conservative-Liberal Unionist	Arthur Balfour	272	40.6%	3,104,407	46.8%
Conservative Party	Arthur Balfour	211	31.5%	2,553,510	38.5%
Liberal Unionist Party	Joseph Chamberlain	43	6.4%	492,473	7.4%
Irish Unionist Party (Note: Stood under the Conservative Party Whip; all figures are attributed to the Conservative Party nationally.)	Edward Carson	18	2.7%	58,424	0.9%
Irish Parliamentary Party	John Redmond	71 (Note: Includes T. P. O'Connor in Liverpool Scotland.)	10.6%	81,097	1.2%
Labour Party	Arthur Henderson	40	6.0%	505,657	7.0%
All-for-Ireland League	William O'Brien	8	1.2%	27,987	0.4%
Independent Nationalist	—N/a	3	0.4%	17,563	0.3%
Independent Tariff Reform	Samuel Storey	1	0.1%	12,334	0.1%
Independent Liberal	—N/a	1	0.1%	7,056	0.1%

=== Full results ===

UK General Election January 1910
		Candidates						Votes		
Party	Leader	Stood	Elected	Gained	Unseated	Net	% of total	%	No.	Net %
Conservative and Liberal Unionist	Arthur Balfour	594	272	130	14	+116	40.6	46.8	2,919,236	+3.4
Liberal	H. H. Asquith	511	274	12	135	−123	40.9	43.5	2,712,511	−5.4
Labour	Arthur Henderson	78	40	17	6	+11	6.0	7.0	435,770	+2.1
Irish Parliamentary	John Redmond	85	71	0	11	−11	10.6	1.2	74,047	+0.6
All-for-Ireland	William O'Brien	10	8	8	0	+8	1.2	0.4	23,605	
Ind. Nationalist	N/A	10	3	3	2	+2	0.5	0.3	16,533	
Social Democratic Federation	H. M. Hyndman	9	0	0	0	0		0.2	13,479	−0.1
Ind. Conservative	N/A	4	1	1	1	0	0.1	0.2	11,772	
Free Trader	John Eldon Gorst	4	0	0	0	0		0.2	11,553	
Independent Labour	N/A	6	0	0	1	−1		0.2	9,936	
Independent Liberal	N/A	3	1	1	0	+1	0.1	0.1	5,237	
Scottish Prohibition	Edwin Scrymgeour	1	0	0	0	0		0.0	756	

=== Popular vote ===
Popular vote
Liberal	43.5%
Conservative	39.4%
Liberal Unionist	7.4%
Labour	7.0%
Irish Parliamentary	1.2%
All-for-Ireland	0.4%
Ind. Nationalist	0.3%
Others	0.8%

Popular vote (alliances)
Con-LU	46.8%
Liberal	43.5%
Labour	7.0%
Irish Parliamentary	1.2%
All-for-Ireland	0.4%
Ind. Nationalist	0.3%
Others	0.8%

=== Parliament seats ===
Parliamentary seats
Liberal	40.9%
Conservative	34.2%
Irish Parliamentary	10.6%
Liberal Unionist	6.4%
Labour	6.0%
All-for-Ireland	1.2%
Ind. Nationalist	0.3%
Others	0.3%

Popular vote (alliances)
Liberal	40.9%
Con-LU	40.6%
Irish Parliamentary	10.6%
Labour	6.0%
All-for-Ireland	1.2%
Ind. Nationalist	0.3%
Others	0.3%

== Aftermath ==
Liberals had to rely on the Irish Parliamentary Party and Labour for their parliamentary majority. As the price for their continued support, the Irish nationalists demanded measures to remove the Lords' veto so that they could no longer block Irish Home Rule. The Lords accepted the electoral mandate and approved the People's Budget on 28 April 1910, but contention between the government and the Lords continued throughout the year. The government called a further election in December 1910 to get a mandate for the Parliament Act 1911, which would prevent the House of Lords from permanently blocking legislation.

== See also ==
- January 1910 United Kingdom general election in England
- January 1910 United Kingdom general election in Ireland
- January 1910 United Kingdom general election in Scotland
- January 1910 United Kingdom general election in Wales
- List of United Kingdom Parliament constituencies (1885–1918) by region
- List of MPs elected in the January 1910 United Kingdom general election
- Parliamentary franchise in the United Kingdom 1885–1918
