= Free Trader =

Free Trader was a political label used in the United Kingdom by several candidates in the 1906 general election and January 1910 general election. Many were Conservative Party or Liberal Unionist politicians opposed to Joseph Chamberlain's campaign for tariff reform.

Initially many belonged to the Unionist Free Food League created in July 1903 to counter the influence of the Tariff Reform League in the Unionist government of Arthur Balfour. However, as many local Conservative and Liberal Unionist associations supported Chamberlain's campaign, those who opposed Tariff Reform found their position precarious. They eventually split three ways with some staying in the Unionist coalition in the hope Tariff Reform could be beaten internally, others joining the staunchly free trade Liberal Party and a few choosing to run as independent Free Traders.

Those standing as Free Traders were concentrated in university constituencies, led by John Eldon Gorst, who had been previously elected as a Conservative Party M.P. but had split from the party in 1902 and was opposed to Chamberlain. The group did receive tacit (and sometimes active) support from former Liberal Unionist leader Spencer Cavendish, 8th Duke of Devonshire and other Unionists opposed to tariff reform. However attempts to form some sort of pro-free trade electoral pact with the Liberals were unsuccessful.

The Free Traders were in favour of limited social reforms, and in particular of free trade. While several of its candidates received substantial votes in the 1906 General Election, none were elected. In January 1910 Gorst stood instead as a Liberal candidate, though unsuccessfully. A few other Free Trader candidates stood in this election but without luck. By then also the remaining free trade supporting Unionists who had stuck with their party had also been effectively purged.

In 1911 at the by-election for one of the Cambridge University seats, former Liberal MP Harold Cox stood as a Free Trader against official Conservative and independent Conservative candidates. There was no Liberal candidate but Cox still lost the contest.
