= January 1910 United Kingdom general election in Wales =

- 15 Jan. – 10 Feb. 1910

All 34 Welsh seats to the House of Commons
- Turnout: 84.9% (▲2.3 pp)
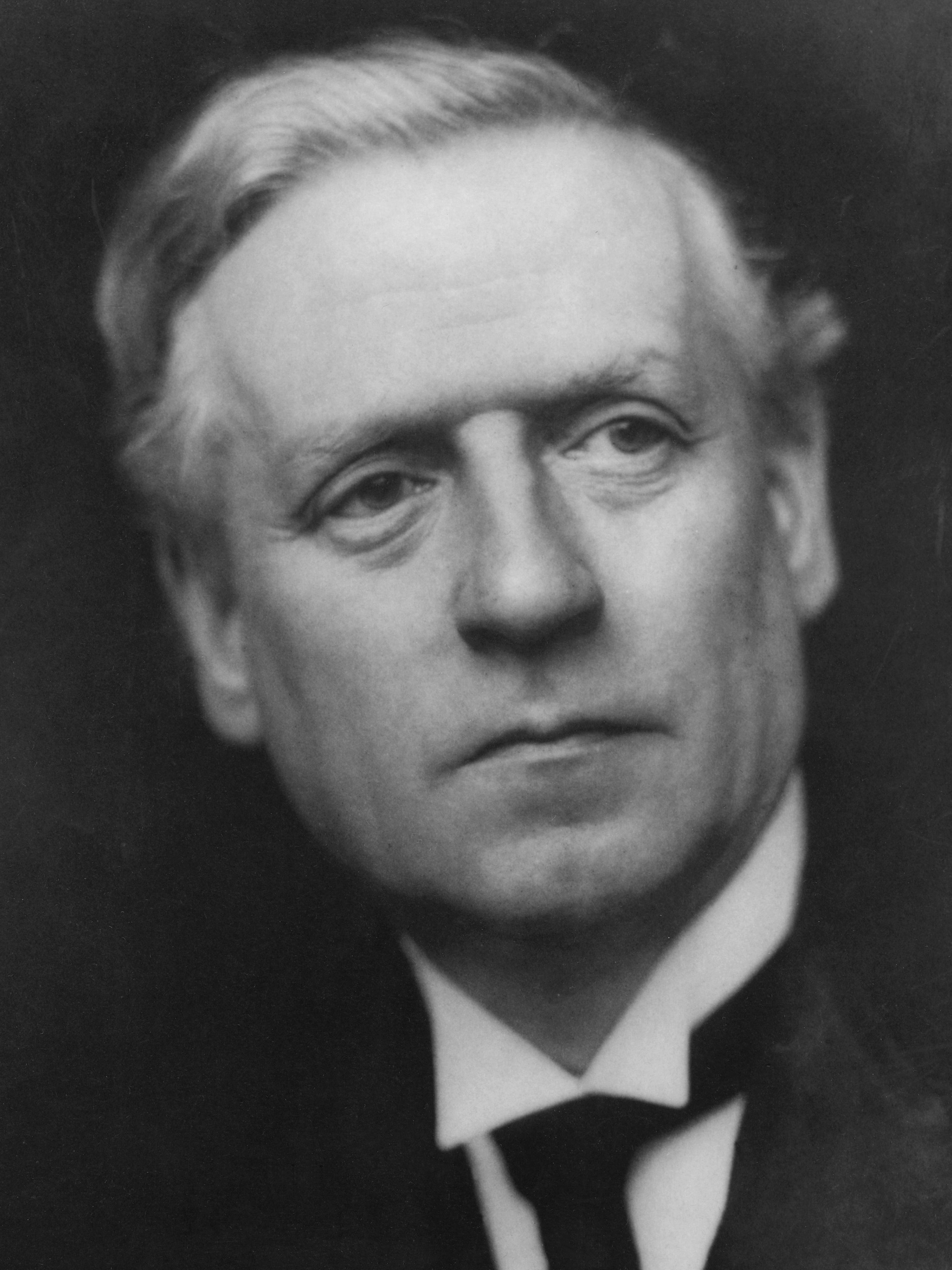

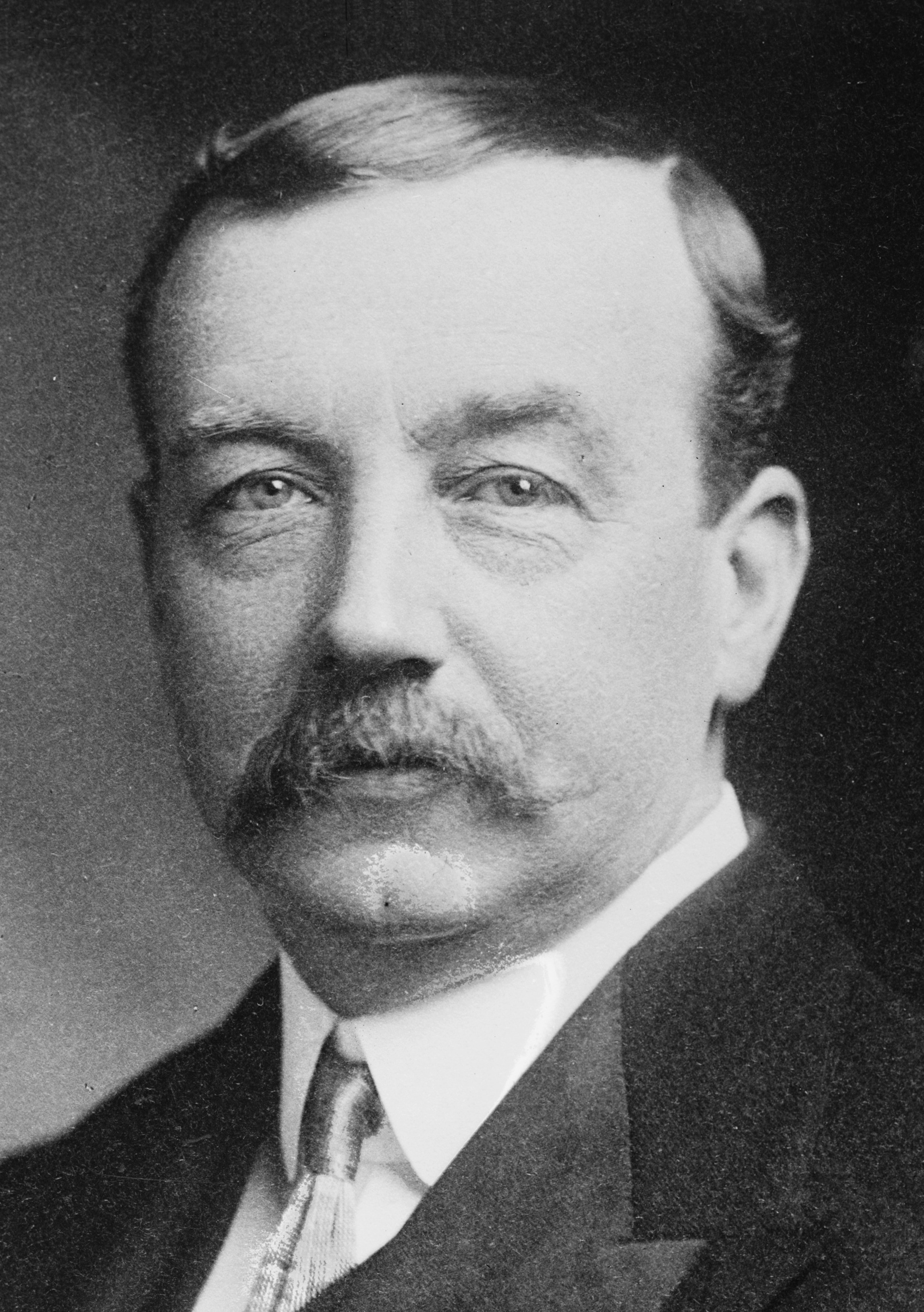

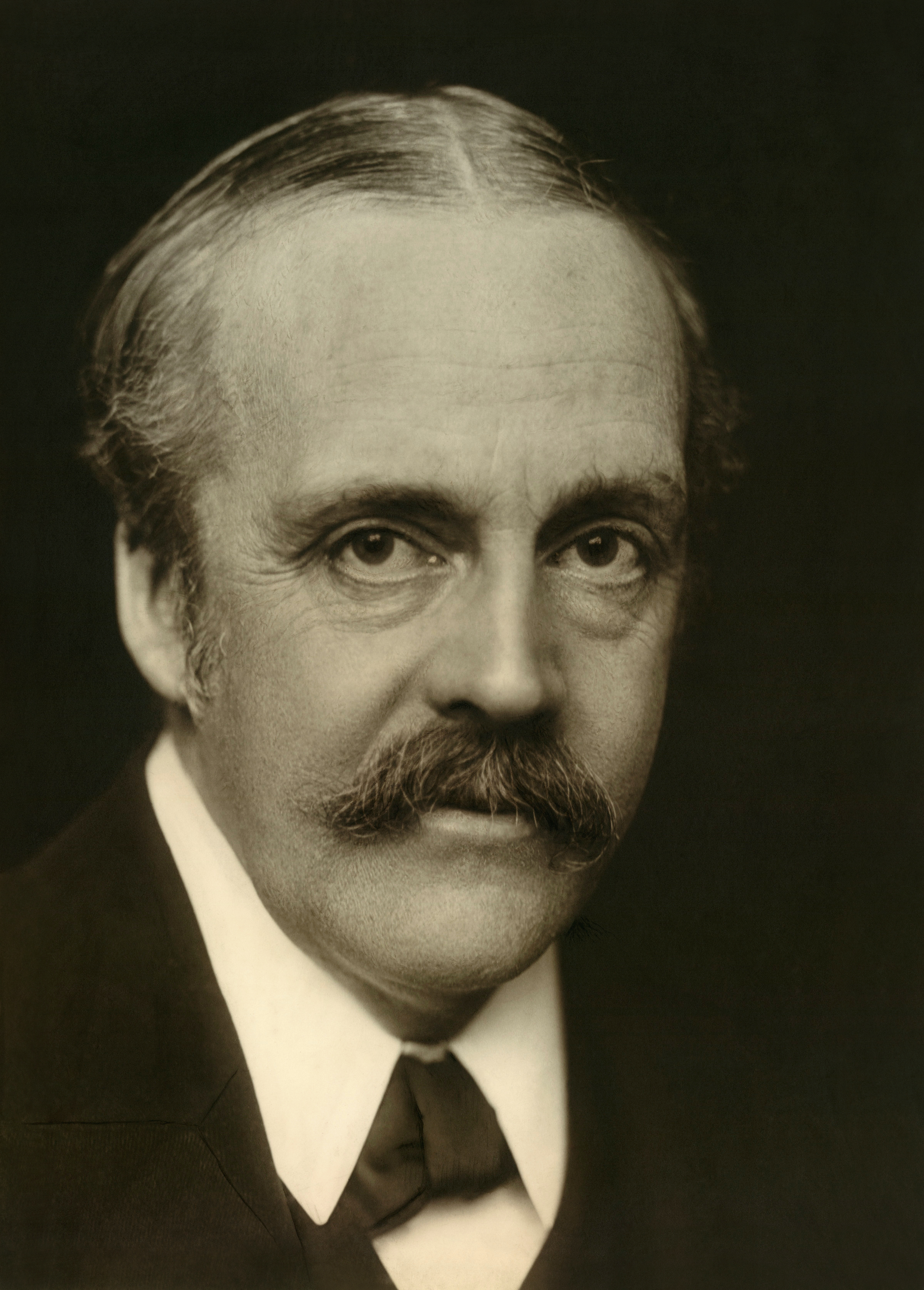

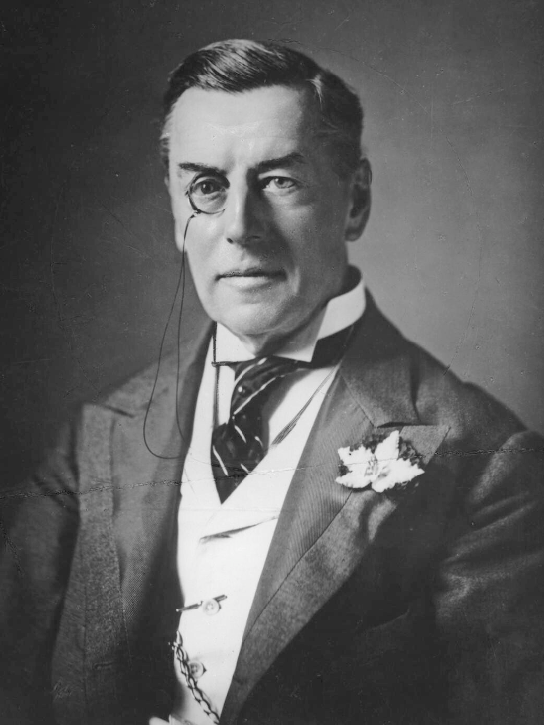
	First party	Second party
Leader	H. H. Asquith	Arthur Henderson
Party	Liberal	Labour
Leader since	30 April 1908	22 January 1908
Leader's seat	East Fife	Barnard Castle
Last election	32 seats, 60.2%	1 seat, 3.5%
Seats won	27	5
Seat change	▼5	▲4
Popular vote	195,288	60,496
Percentage	52.3%	14.9%
Swing	▼7.9 pp	▲11.5 pp
	Third party	Fourth party
Leader	Arthur Balfour	Joseph Chamberlain
Party	Conservative	Liberal Unionist
Alliance	Conservative-Liberal Unionist	Conservative-Liberal Unionist
Leader since	11 June 1902	1903
Leader's seat	City of London	Birmingham West
Last election	0 seats, 25.9%	0 seats, 7.9%
Seats won	2	0
Seat change	▲2	Steady
Popular vote	114,804	1,965
Percentage	31.4%	0.5%
Swing	▲5.5 pp	▼7.4 pp

From 15 January to 10 February 1910, the January 1910 United Kingdom general election was held in Wales, to elect all 670 members of the House of Commons, with 34 seats being in Wales. 34 seats represented territorial constituencies contested under the first past the post electoral system amongst 33 constituencies.

The election was called amid a constitutional crisis after the Conservative-dominated House of Lords rejected the People's Budget. The Liberal government, sought a dissolution of parliament for the election seeking a mandate, however lost their majority. It was the second of two general elections held during the reign of King Edward VII, due to his death in May 1910.

The election resulted in a hung parliament in which the Conservative Party, along with its long-time ally, the Liberal Unionist Party won the most votes, but with the Liberal Party under H. H. Asquith won the most seats. In Wales, the liberal Party saw a loss of support in favour of the relatively new Labour Party, with the Conservative Party regaining some ground following its decisive defeat at the last election. It was the last election at which the Liberal party would hold the majority of the vote share in Wales.

Another election followed in December as the Liberal government sought a mandate for the Parliament Act 1911, which would prevent the House of Lords from permanently blocking legislation linked to money bills.

== Candidates ==
Below is a table summarising the candidates of the January 1910 general election in Wales.

Affiliation	Candidates
Conservative Party	32
Liberal Party	29 (Note: Includes Liberal-Labour candidate Clement Edwards who stood in Denbigh Boroughs.)
Labour Party	5 (Note: The candidates that stood were Keir Hardie in Merthyr Tydfil and James Whinstone in Monmouth Boroughs, William Abraham in Rhondda, William Brace in South Glamorganshire and Thomas Richards in West Monmouthshire.)
Liberal Unionist Party	1 (Note: Candidate Viscount Tiverton stood in Carmarthen Boroughs.)
Independent Liberal	1 (Note: Candidate William Pritchard-Morgan stood in Merthyr Tydfil.)
Independent Labour	1 (Note: Candidate Ben Tillett stood in Swansea Town.)
Total	69

== Analysis ==
=== Liberal Party ===
The Liberal Party under H. H. Asquith saw a 7.9% decrease in vote share primarily to the Labour Party, with a net loss of 5 seats to both Labour and the Conservative party.

The Liberal Party retained the seats of Anglesey, Arfon, Eifion, East Denbighshire, Flint Boroughs, Flintshire, Merioneth, Montgomeryshire, Breconshire, Cardiganshire, Carmarthen Boroughs, East Carmarthenshire, West Carmarthenshire, West Denbighshire, Pembrokeshire, Caernarfon, East Glamorganshire, Mid Glamorganshire, Cardiff, Swansea Town, Swansea District, Monmouth Boroughs, South Monmouthshire, Montgomery, Pembroke and Haverfordwest and North Monmouthshire. The party also held one of the two seats in the two-member constituency of Merthyr Tydfil.

However, it lost seats primarily to the Labour Party by way of the majority of its union-sponsored candidates joining the Labour Party and standing as such at this election, losing three seats to Labour along with two to the Conservative Party. However, it still maintained its dominant position in Wales.

=== Conservatives and Liberal Unionists ===
The Conservative Party, which was within a long-term alliance with the Liberal Unionist Party saw a large swing in its favour. However, when combined with the drop in support with the Liberal Unionists by way it standing less candidates than last election, and despite the Conservatives standing more than the Liberal Party in Wales, saw a minor 1.9% drop overall in vote share.

The Conservatives made gains in seats, with candidate Charles Dillwyn-Venables-Llewelyn winning Radnorshire from the Liberal Party. Additionally, it won Denbigh Boroughs from Liberal-Labour MP Clement Edwards. Edwards had remained loyal to the Liberal Party and remained standing as a joint candidate with a union unlike other Liberal-Labour candidates at this election, who had largely defected to stand as Labour candidates. As such, the Conservative Party regained two seats and therefore its representation in Wales compared to the last election.

The Liberal Unionist Party only stood one candidate in Wales. This was Viscount Tiverton, who stood in Carmarthen Boroughs. However, although taking 31.9% of the vote, he was unsuccessful in the seat.

=== Labour Party ===
The Labour Party, which had emerged from the Labour Representation Committee, stood 5 candidates in Wales. The now former leader of the Labour Party, Keir Hardie, retained his seat, being one of the two in Merthyr Tydfil. The rest of Labour's candidates in Wales came from former Liberal Labour candidates, who were official Liberal candidate but with support of certain unions in the last election. However, they had since joined the Labour Party following its formation 1906. These were William Abraham in Rhondda, William Brace in South Glamorganshire, Thomas Richards in West Monmouthshire.

Finally, former Independent Liberal-Labor MP, John Williams in Gower, who had stood against the Liberal Party at the last election, but who then had since joined the Liberal Party following the 1906 election, had defected to the Labour Party following its formation. He once again stood in the seat and won it as a Labour candidate. As such, Labour increased its seat count from 1 seat to 5 at this election, with a large swing of 11.5% owing from the former-Liberal incumbent dual Liberal candidates switching to the party.

== Results ==
Party	Seats					Aggregate votes		
Party	Total	Gains	Losses	Net	Of total (%)	Total	Of total (%) (Note: Adjusted for multi-member constituencies.)	Change (%)
Liberal	27	0	5	▼5	79.4	105,837	52.3	▼7.9
Conservative-Liberal Unionist	2	2	0	▲2	5.9	116,769	31.9	▼1.9
Conservative	2	2	0	▲2	5.9	114,804	31.4	▲5.5
Liberal Unionist	0	0	0	Steady	—	1,965	0.5	▼7.4
Labour	5	4	0	▲4	14.7	60,496	14.9	▲11.5
Independent Liberal	0	Did not stand in 1906			—	3,639	0.5	—N/a
Independent Labour	0	New			—	1,451	0.4	New
Other non-contested	0	—N/a		▼1 (Note: John Williams in Gower retained his seat but as an official Labour candidate.)	—	0	0.0	—N/a
Total	34			0	100.0	377,643	100.0	0.0
Registered voters, and turnout						425,744 (Note: Electorate in contested constituencies, which was all seats in this election.)	84.9	▲2.3

=== Popular vote ===
Popular vote
Liberal	52.3%
Conservative	31.4%
Labour	14.9%
Liberal Unionist	0.5%
Ind. Liberal	0.5%
Ind. Labour	0.4%

Popular vote (alliances)
Liberal	52.3%
Con-LU	31.9%
Labour	14.9%
Ind. Liberal	0.5%
Ind. Labour	0.4%

=== Parliament seats ===
Parliament seats
Liberal	79.4%
Labour	14.7%
Conservative	5.9%

Parliament seats (alliances)
Liberal	79.4%
Labour	14.7%
Con-LU	5.9%

== See also ==
- January 1910 United Kingdom general election in England
- January 1910 United Kingdom general election in Ireland
- January 1910 United Kingdom general election in Scotland
- List of United Kingdom Parliament constituencies (1885–1918) by region
- List of MPs for constituencies in Wales (January 1910-December 1910)
