= Robert Gageby =

Irish trade union leader and politician

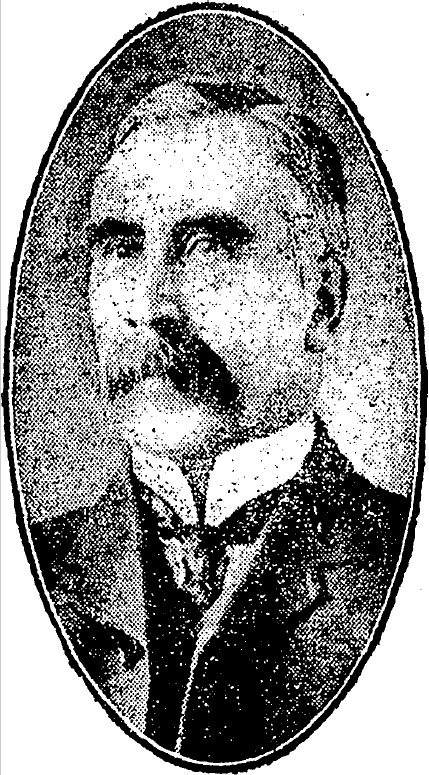
Gageby in 1910

Robert Gageby (died 27 December 1934) was an Irish trade union leader and politician.

Gageby grew up in the Shankill area of Belfast, and worked in a mill from the age of eleven. He became the secretary of the Flax Dressers' Trade Union, and was also elected to the Belfast Trades Council. In 1898, he was one of six trade unionists elected to the Belfast Corporation, with the backing of the Independent Labour Party. On the council, he represented the Shankill ward, and chaired the Baths and Lodging House Committee.

At the January 1910 United Kingdom general election, Gageby stood for the Labour Party in Belfast North, and took 38.6% of the vote, losing to Robert Thompson of the Irish Unionist Party. Soon after the election, Gageby was invited to London, where he discussed with Winston Churchill the possibility of opening a Labour Exchange in Belfast. This occurred, and Gageby became its manager, withdrawing from political activity.

During World War I, Gageby was the Investigation Officer of the Labour Department of the Ministry of Munitions. He remained in this department until the Government of Northern Ireland was established, after which time he worked for its Ministry of Labour.

Gageby's grandson, Douglas Gageby, became the editor of the Irish Times.
