= Unionist Free Food League =

British pressure group

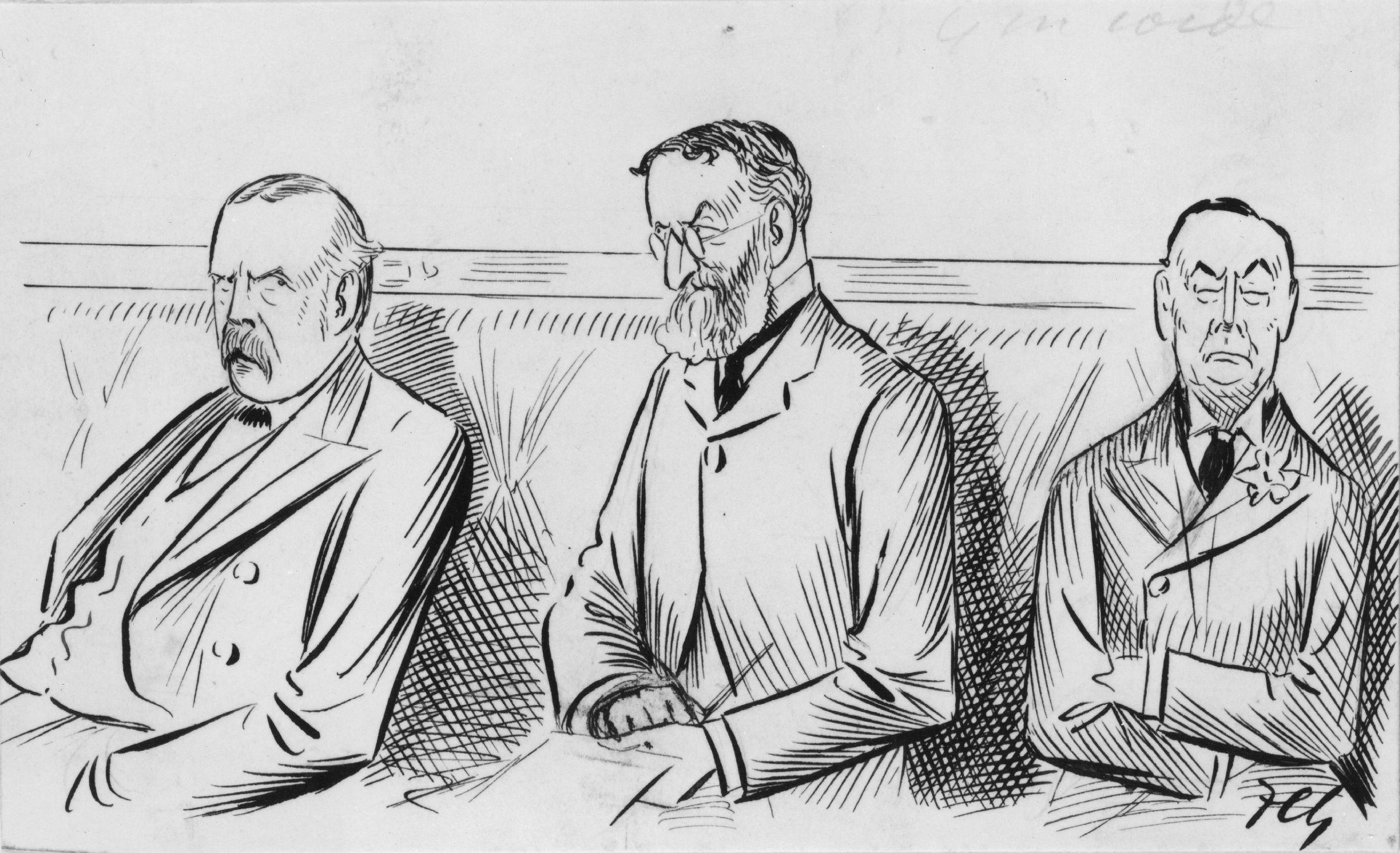
Michael Hicks Beach (centre) with Arthur Balfour (left) and Joseph Chamberlain (right), by Sir Francis Carruthers Gould.

The Unionist Free Food League was a British pressure group formed on 13 July 1903 by Conservative and Liberal Unionist politicians who believed in free trade and who wished to campaign against Joseph Chamberlain's proposals for Tariff Reform, which would involve an import tax on food. About 40 Conservative and 20 Liberal Unionist MPs attended the initial meeting. The former Unionist Chancellor of the Exchequer, Sir Michael Hicks Beach, became president of the group. He was replaced in October 1903 by the Liberal Unionist party leader, the Duke of Devonshire.

Members included George Goschen, Hugh Cecil, Robert Cecil and Winston Churchill. Some, like Churchill, later defected to the Liberal Party. The Free Food League changed its name to the Unionist Free Trade Club in 1905.

Whereas Chamberlain's Tariff Reform League was a grass-roots organisation which had captured 300 Unionist constituency associations by 1906, the Unionist Free Trade Club was little more than a parliamentary group and so was much less effective. Unionist Free Traders were also unable to persuade any newspapers to support them, with only the Conservative weekly magazine The Spectator supported their cause.

In 1906, after the General Election, there were 16 Free Trade Unionists MPs left. Some, like Hugh Cecil, lost their seat due to a split vote with a Tariff Reformer and so both lost out to the Liberal candidate. By the end of 1910, following two more General Elections, the only survivor in the House of Commons was Hugh Cecil (who was returned for one of Oxford University's seats), with just a few adherents left in the House of Lords, like Henry James, 1st Baron James of Hereford.

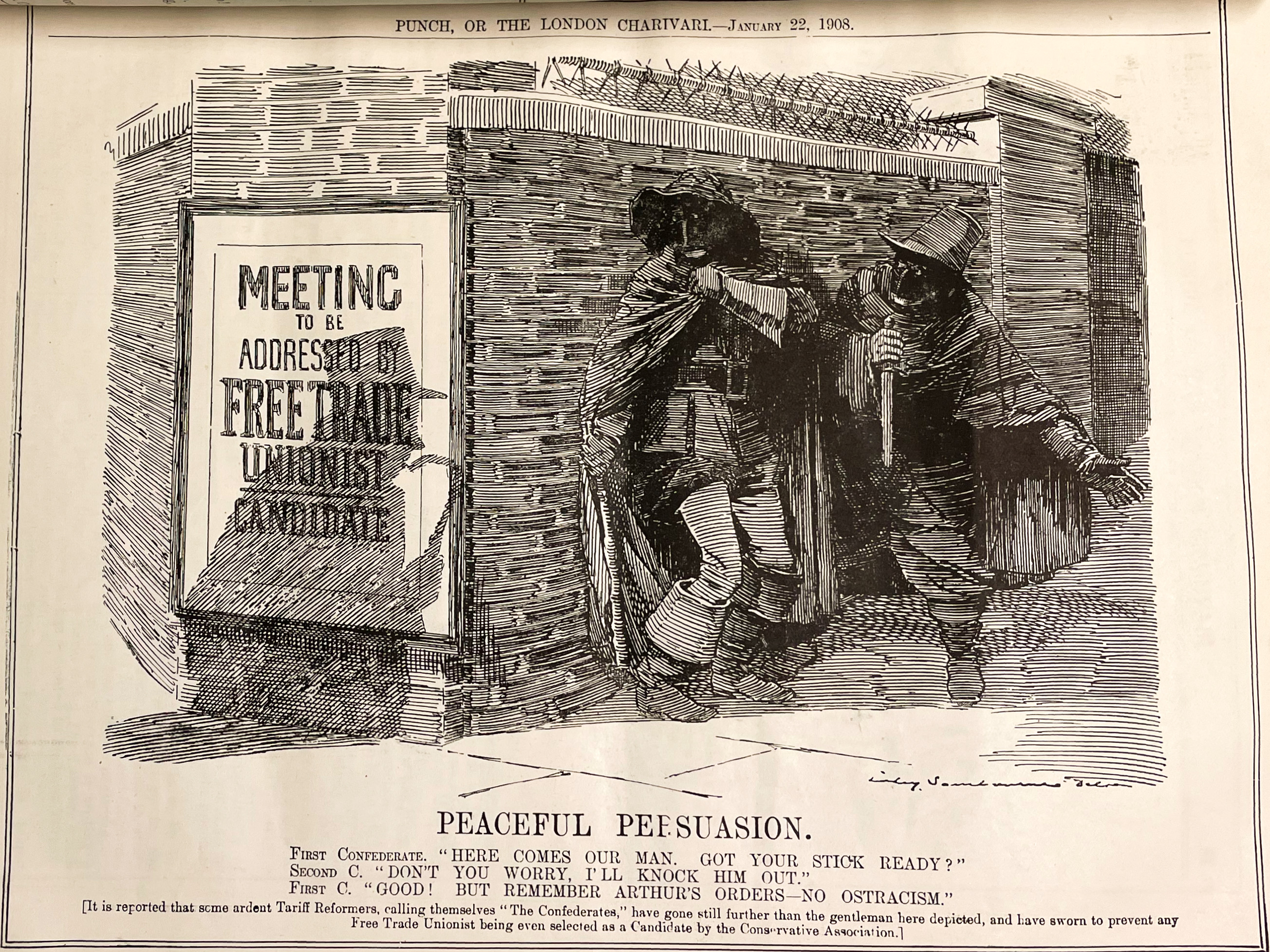
1908 Punch cartoon on lack of support for the Unionist Free Trade Club
