= Tariff Reform League =

British protectionist pressure group

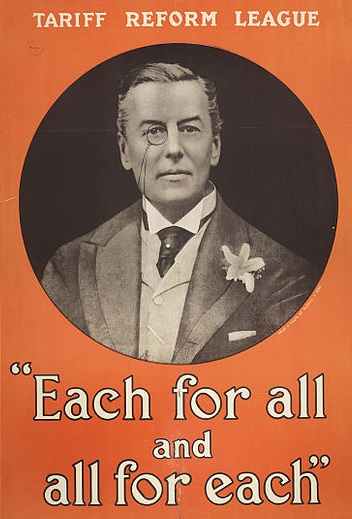
Tariff Reform League poster, featuring Joseph Chamberlain

The Tariff Reform League (TRL) was a protectionist British pressure group formed in 1903 to protest against what they considered to be unfair foreign imports and to advocate Imperial Preference to protect British industry from foreign competition. It was well funded and included politicians, intellectuals and businessmen, and was popular with the grassroots of the Conservative Party. It was internally opposed by the Unionist Free Food League (later Unionist Free Trade Club) but that had virtually disappeared as a viable force by 1910. By 1914 the Tariff Reform League had approximately 250,000 members. It is associated with the national campaign of Joseph Chamberlain, the most outspoken and charismatic supporter of Tariff Reform. The historian Bruce Murray has claimed that the TRL "possessed fewer prejudices against large-scale government expenditure than any other political group in Edwardian Britain".

The League wanted to see the British Empire transformed into a single trading bloc, to compete with Germany and the United States. It favoured imposing duties on imports—as did Germany and the US—and the channelling of the money raised from these duties into social reforms. High import duties, the League claimed, would make increasing other taxes unnecessary. However opponents claimed that protection would mean dearer food, especially bread.

Sir Cyril Arthur Pearson was its chairman and, with Sir Harry Brittain, a founding member. Sir Henry Page Croft was chairman of its organisation committee. Pearson was later succeeded as chairman of the League by Viscount Ridley.

In December 1903 Joseph Chamberlain announced the establishment of the Tariff Commission under the auspices of the Tariff Reform League. William Hewins the economist and first director of the London School of Economics from 1895 to 1903, was Secretary and Sir Robert Herbert, the first Premier of Queensland, Australia, was Chairman. The Commission consisted of 59 business men whose brief was to construct a "Scientific Tariff" which would achieve tariff reform objectives.

Tariff Reform split the MPs of the Conservative Party and their government coalition allies in the Liberal Unionist Party and was the major factor in its landslide defeat in 1906 to the Liberals who advocated Free Trade. The Conservative Party under Bonar Law slightly downplayed Tariff Reform as official policy, abandoning Balfour's pledge that it would be put to the public in a referendum. Some wartime tariffs ("McKenna Duties") were, ironically, introduced by the Liberal Chancellor Reginald McKenna in 1915.

Shortly after the First World War the TRL was disbanded, although other organisations promoting the same cause were still active in the 1920s. One such organisation was the Fair Trade Union created by Joseph Chamberlain's son, Neville, and the Conservative MP Leo Amery. The British Commonwealth Union, led by Patrick Hannon, was another. Tariff Reform became official Conservative policy under Stanley Baldwin and was the major issue in the 1923 general election. The party lost its majority in the election and Tariff Reform was again dropped until the 1930s. Protectionism was eventually introduced by the Ottawa Agreements in 1932 (Joseph's son Neville Chamberlain was Chancellor at the time) and then dismantled at US insistence (Article VII of the wartime Lend Lease Agreement) in the 1940s.

A Tariff Reform League lapel pin
