= 1908 Bewdley by-election =

UK Parliamentary by-election

The 1908 Bewdley by-election was held on 29 February 1908. The by-election was held due to the death of the incumbent Conservative MP, Alfred Baldwin. It was won by his son and the future Prime Minister, the Conservative candidate Stanley Baldwin, who was unopposed.
