= List of MPs for constituencies in Wales (January 1910–December 1910) =

- 15 January – 10 February 1910
- Colours on map indicate the party allegiance of each constituency's MP.

This is a list of members of Parliament in Wales, elected to the House of Commons of the United Kingdom in the January 1910 general election.

== Composition ==
Affiliation	Members
Liberal Party	27
Labour Party	5
Conservative Party	2
Total	34

== MPs ==
MP	Constituency	Party	In constituency since
William Abraham	Rhondda	Labour Party	1885
William Brace	South Glamorganshire	Labour Party	1906
David Brynmor Jones	Swansea District	Liberal Party	1895
David Davies	Montgomeryshire	Liberal Party	1906
Ellis William Davies	Eifion	Liberal Party	1906
Ellis Ellis-Griffith	Anglesey	Liberal Party	1895
Samuel Thomas Evans	Mid Glamorganshire	Liberal Party	1892
Keir Hardie	Merthyr Tydfil	Labour Party	1900
Lewis Haslam	Monmouth Boroughs	Liberal Party	1906
Edward Hemmerde	East Denbighshire	Liberal Party	1906 by-election
Ivor Herbert	South Monmouthshire	Liberal Party	1906
Edgar Jones	Merthyr Tydfil	Liberal Party	January 1910
Henry Haydn Jones	Merioneth	Liberal Party	January 1910
William Jones	Arfon	Liberal Party	1895
Herbert Lewis	Flintshire	Liberal Party	1906
Charles Dillwyn-Venables-Llewelyn	Radnorshire	Conservative Party	January 1910
David Lloyd George	Caernarfon	Liberal Party	1890
Reginald McKenna	North Monmouthshire	Liberal Party	1895
Alfred Mond	Swansea	Liberal Party	January 1910
John Lloyd Morgan	West Carmarthenshire	Liberal Party	1889 by-election
William Ormsby-Gore	Denbigh Boroughs	Conservative Party	January 1910
Thomas Richards	West Monmouthshire	Labour Party	1904 by-election
John Roberts	West Denbighshire	Liberal Party	1892
Sidney Robinson	Breconshire	Liberal Party	1906
Walter Roch	Pembrokeshire	Liberal Party	1908 by-election
Abel Thomas	East Carmarthenshire	Liberal Party	1890 by-election
Alfred Thomas	East Glamorganshire	Liberal Party	1885
D. A. Thomas	Cardiff	Liberal Party	January 1910
Matthew Vaughan-Davies	Cardiganshire	Liberal Party	1895
W. Llewelyn Williams	Carmarthen Boroughs	Liberal Party	1906
John Williams	Gower	Labour Party	1906

== By-elections ==
- February 1910: Swansea District
- March 1910: Mid Glamorganshire

== See also ==
- List of MPs elected in the January 1910 United Kingdom general election
- January 1910 United Kingdom general election
