= List of MPs for constituencies in Wales (December 1910–1918) =

- 3–19 December 1910
- Colours on map indicate the party allegiance of each constituency's MP.

This is a list of members of Parliament in Wales, elected to the House of Commons of the United Kingdom in the December 1910 general election.

== Composition ==
Affiliation	Members
Liberal Party	26
Labour Party	5
Conservative Party	3
Total	34

== MPs ==
MP	Constituency	Party	In constituency since	Ref.
William Abraham	Rhondda	Labour Party	1885	
William Brace	South Glamorganshire	Labour Party	1906	
David Brynmor Jones	Swansea District	Liberal Party	1895	
Ninian Crichton-Stuart	Cardiff	Conservative Party	December 1910	
David Davies	Montgomeryshire	Liberal Party	1906	
Ellis William Davies	Eifion	Liberal Party	1906	
Clement Edwards	East Glamorganshire	Liberal Party	December 1910	
Frank Edwards	Radnorshire	Liberal Party	December 1910	
John Hugh Edwards	Mid Glamorganshire	Liberal Party	December 1910	
Ellis Ellis-Griffith	Anglesey	Liberal Party	1895	
Keir Hardie	Merthyr Tydfil	Labour Party	1900	
Lewis Haslam	Monmouth Boroughs	Liberal Party	1906	
Ivor Herbert	South Monmouthshire	Liberal Party	1906	
John Hinds	West Carmarthenshire	Liberal Party	December 1910	
Edward John	East Denbighshire	Liberal Party	December 1910	
Edgar Jones	Merthyr Tydfil	Liberal Party	January 1910	
Henry Haydn Jones	Merioneth	Liberal Party	January 1910	
William Jones	Arfon	Liberal Party	1895	
Herbert Lewis	Flintshire	Liberal Party	1906	
David Lloyd George	Caernarvon Boroughs	Liberal Party	1890	
Reginald McKenna	North Monmouthshire	Liberal Party	1895	
Alfred Mond	Swansea	Liberal Party	January 1910	
William Ormsby-Gore	Denbigh Boroughs	Conservative Party	January 1910	
Thomas Richards	West Monmouthshire	Labour Party	1904 by-election	
John Roberts	West Denbighshire	Liberal Party	1892	
Sidney Robinson	Breconshire	Liberal Party	1906	
Walter Roch	Pembrokeshire	Liberal Party	1908 by-election	
Abel Thomas	East Carmarthenshire	Liberal Party	1890 by-election	
Matthew Vaughan-Davies	Cardiganshire	Liberal Party	1895	
W. Llewelyn Williams	Carmarthen Boroughs	Liberal Party	1906	
John Williams	Gower	Labour Party	1906	
James Woolley Summers	Flint Boroughs	Liberal Party	December 1910	
Edward Pryce-Jones	Montgomery Boroughs	Conservative Party	December 1910	
Henry Guest	Pembroke and Haverfordwest	Liberal Party	December 1910	

== By-elections ==
- February 1911: Arfon
- January 1912: Carmarthen District
- August 1912: East Carmarthenshire
- January 1913: Flint Boroughs
- August 1914: Swansea District
- February 1915: Swansea District
- March 1915: Carmarthen Boroughs
- July 1915: Arfon
- November 1915: Cardiff
- November 1915: Merthyr Tydfil
- July 1917: South Monmouthshire

== See also ==
- List of MPs elected in the December 1910 United Kingdom general election
- December 1910 United Kingdom general election
