= List of MPs for constituencies in Wales (1906–January 1910) =

- 15 January – 10 February 1910
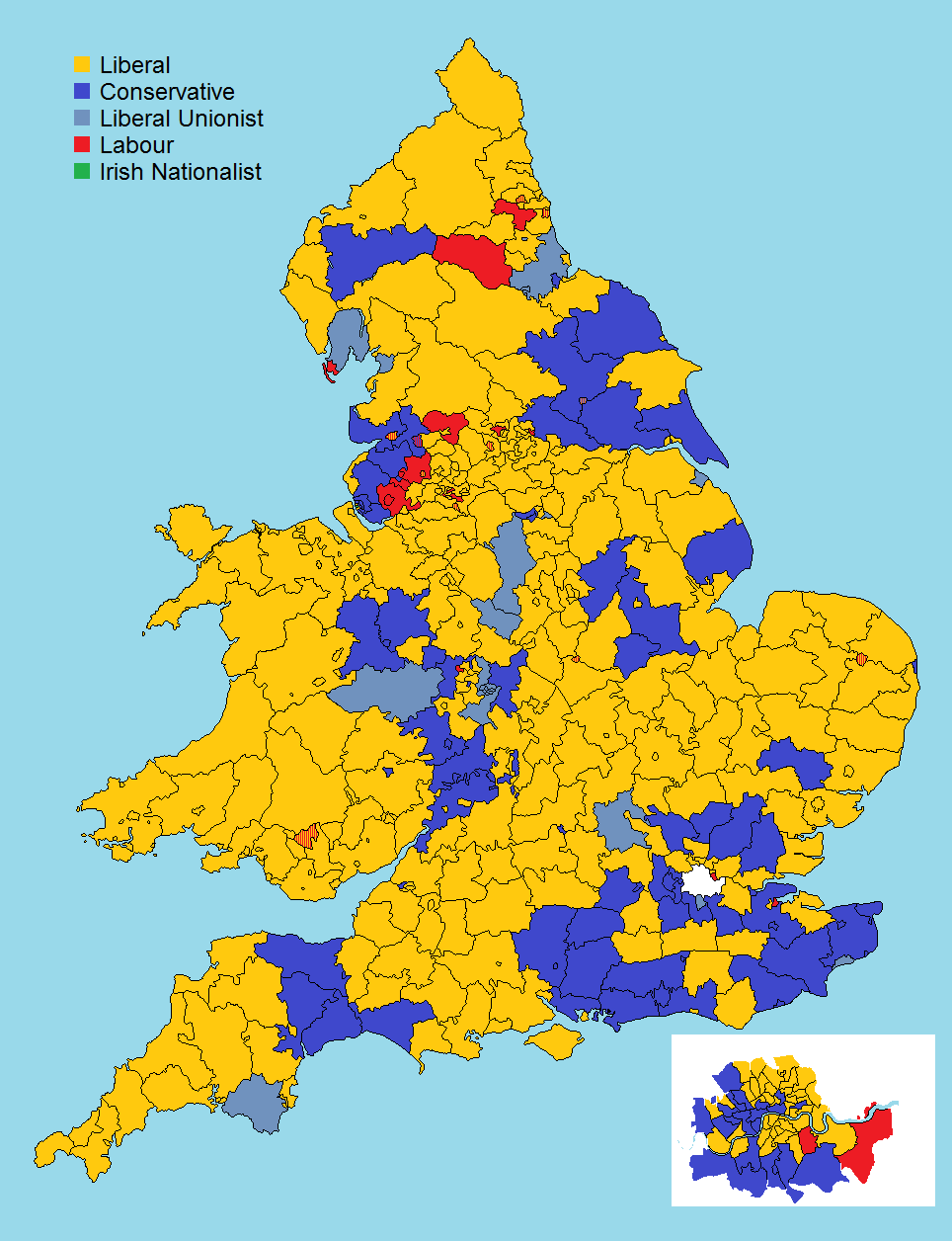
- 1906 general election in England and Wales; Colours on map indicate the party allegiance of each constituency's MP.

This is a list of members of Parliament in Wales, elected to the House of Commons of the United Kingdom in the 1906 general election.

== Composition ==
Affiliation	Members
Liberal Party	28
Liberal-Labour	4
Labour Representation Committee	1
Independent Liberal-Labour	1
Total	34

== MPs ==
MP	Constituency	Party	In constituency since
William Abraham	Rhondda	Lib-Lab	1885
William Brace	South Glamorganshire	Lib-Lab	1906
David Brynmor Jones	Swansea District	Liberal Party	1895
David Davies	Montgomeryshire	Liberal Party	1906
Ellis William Davies	Eifion	Liberal Party	1906
Clement Edwards	Denbigh Boroughs	Lib-Lab	1906
Frank Edwards	Radnorshire	Liberal Party	1900
Ellis Ellis-Griffith	Anglesey	Liberal Party	1895
Samuel Thomas Evans	Mid Glamorganshire	Liberal Party	1892
Keir Hardie	Merthyr Tydfil	Labour Repr. Cmte.	1900
Lewis Haslam	Monmouth Boroughs	Liberal Party	1906
Ivor Herbert	South Monmouthshire	Liberal Party	1906
William Jones	Arfon	Liberal Party	1895
Herbert Lewis	Flintshire	Liberal Party	1906
David Lloyd George	Caernarfon	Liberal Party	1890
Reginald McKenna	North Monmouthshire	Liberal Party	1895
John Lloyd Morgan	West Carmarthenshire	Liberal Party	1889 by-election
Samuel Moss	East Denbighshire	Liberal Party	1897 by-election
George Newnes	Swansea	Liberal Party	1900
Thomas Richards	West Monmouthshire	Lib-Lab	1904 by-election
John Roberts	West Denbighshire	Liberal Party	1892
Sidney Robinson	Breconshire	Liberal Party	1906
Walter Roch	Pembrokeshire	Liberal Party	1908 by-election
Abel Thomas	East Carmarthenshire	Liberal Party	1890 by-election
Alfred Thomas	East Glamorganshire	Liberal Party	1885
D. A. Thomas	Merthyr Tydfil	Liberal Party	1892
Matthew Vaughan-Davies	Cardiganshire	Liberal Party	1895
Osmond Williams	Merioneth	Liberal Party	1900
W. Llewelyn Williams	Carmarthen Boroughs	Liberal Party	1906
John Williams	Gower	Independent Liberal-Labour	1906

== By-elections ==
- June 1906: Eifion
- August 1906: East Denbighshire
- October 1906: Mid Glamorganshire
- February 1907: North Monmouthshire
- August 1907: Anglesey
- February 1908: Mid Glamorganshire
- February 1908: West Carmarthenshire
- July 1908: Pembrokeshire
- April 1909: East Denbighshire

== See also ==
- List of MPs elected in the 1906 United Kingdom general election
- 1906 United Kingdom general election
- 1906 United Kingdom general election in Wales
