= 1906 United Kingdom general election in Wales =

- 12 Jan. – 8 Feb. 1906

All 34 Welsh seats to the House of Commons
- Turnout: 82.6% (▲6.2 pp)
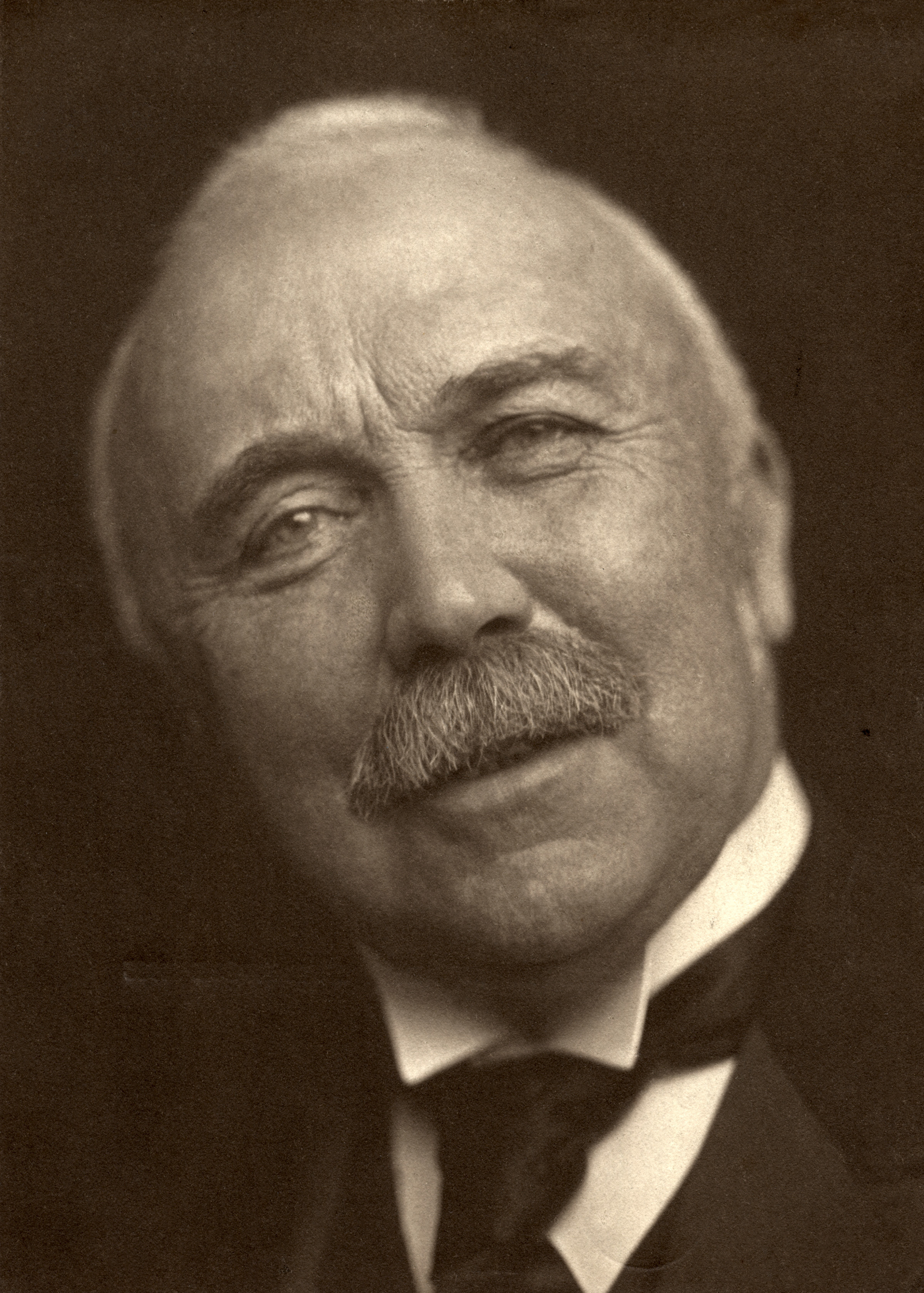

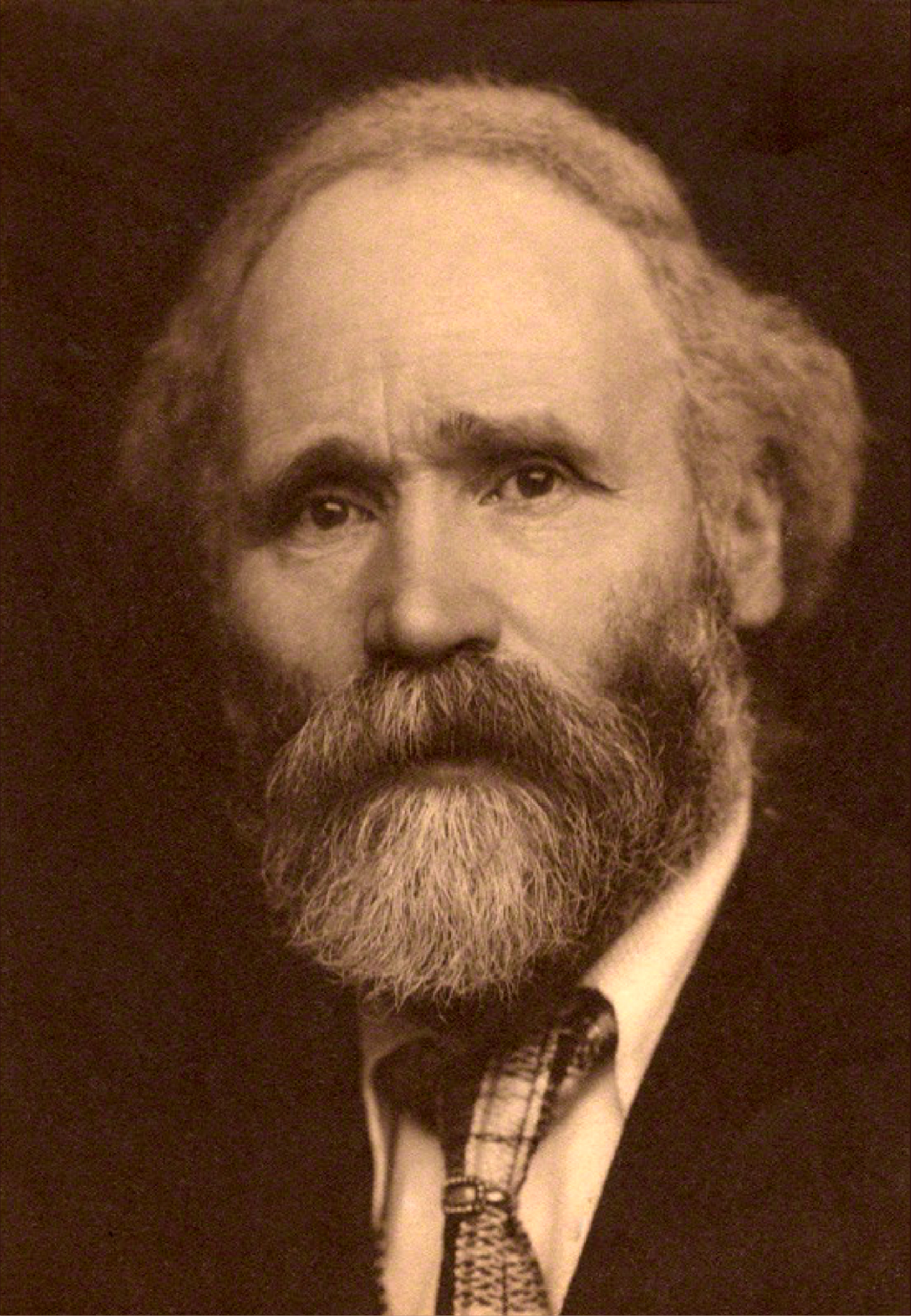

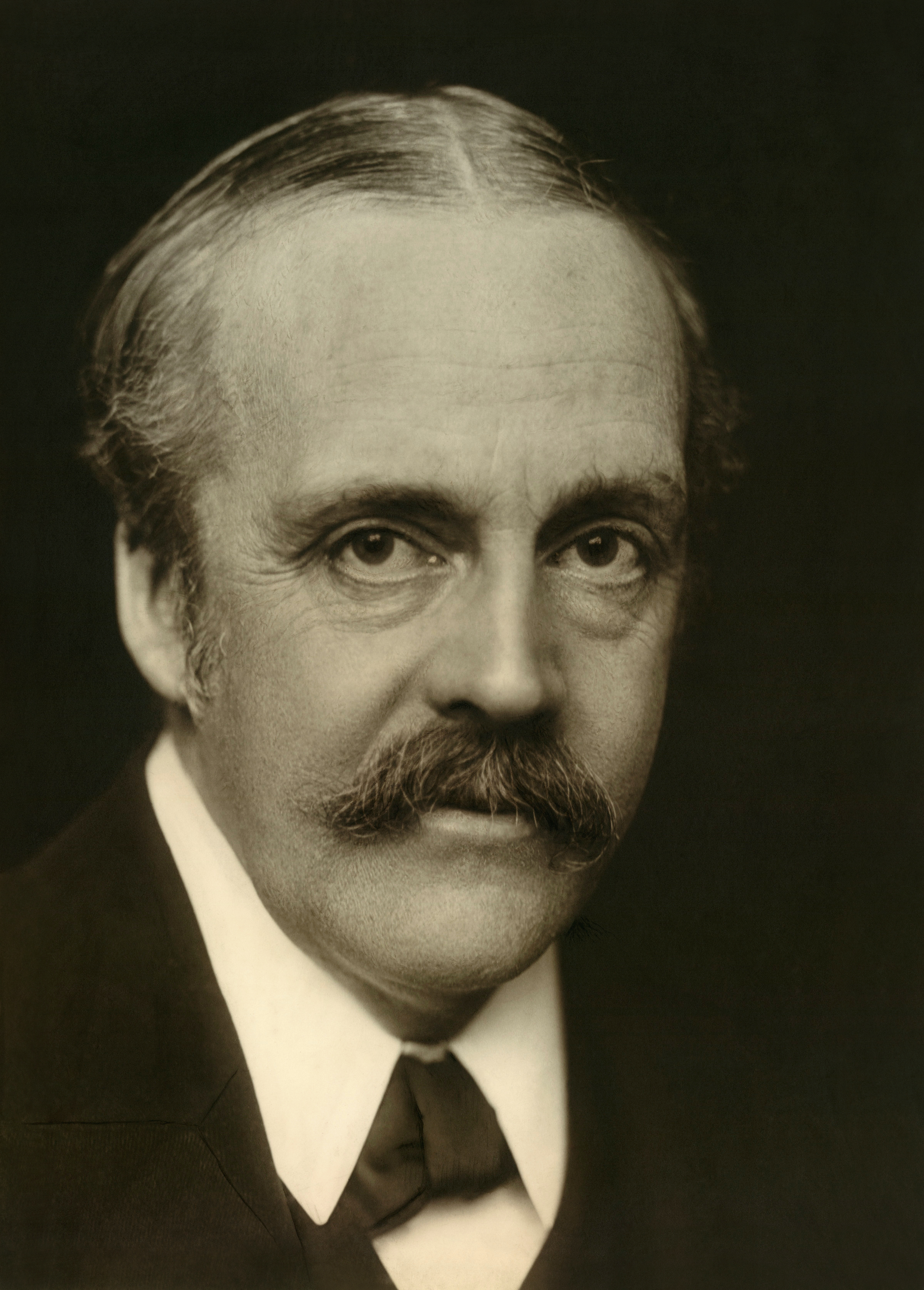

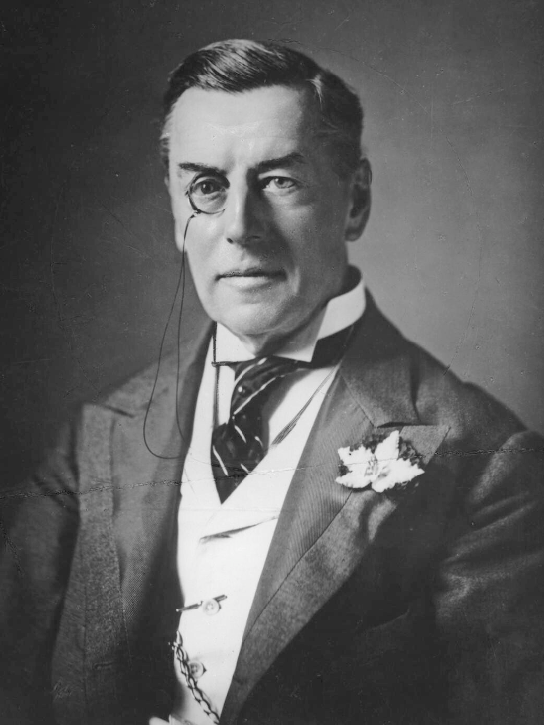
	First party	Second party
Leader	Henry Campbell-Bannerman	Keir Hardie
Party	Liberal	Labour Repr. Cmte.
Alliance	Gladstone–MacDonald pact	Gladstone–MacDonald pact
Leader since	December 1898	28 February 1900
Leader's seat	Stirling Burghs	Merthyr Tydfil
Last election	27 seats, 58.5%	1 seat, 3.9%
Seats won	32	1
Seat change	▲5	Steady
Popular vote	128,461	11,865
Percentage	60.2%	3.5%
Swing	▲1.7 pp	▼0.4 pp
	Third party	Fourth party
Leader	Arthur Balfour	Joseph Chamberlain
Party	Conservative	Liberal Unionist
Alliance	Conservative-Liberal Unionist	Conservative-Liberal Unionist
Leader since	11 June 1902	1903
Leader's seat	Manchester East (lost seat)	Birmingham West
Last election	6 seats, 36.5%	0 seats, 1.1%
Seats won	0	0
Seat change	▼6	Steady
Popular vote	51,752	14,197
Percentage	25.9%	7.9%
Swing	▼10.6 pp	▲6.8 pp

From 12 January to 8 February 1906, the 1906 United Kingdom general election was held in Wales, to elect all 670 members of the House of Commons, with 34 seats being in Wales. 34 seats represented territorial constituencies contested under the first past the post electoral system amongst 33 constituencies.

The election was held as a result of the resignation of the Conservative Government after a series of defeats in by-elections and internal disputes over tariff reform. The Liberal Party formed a minority Liberal Government and immediately requested a dissolution. It was the first of two general elections held during the reign of King Edward VII.

When combined with results from across the United Kingdom the result was a landslide victory for the Liberals against the Conservative Party, whose leader, Arthur Balfour, lost his seat, and its allies the Liberal Unionist Party; the Conservatives won the lowest number of seats it ever had in its history, which was only unsurpassed in 2024. The primary reason given by historians for the Conservatives' and Liberal Unionists' weakness resulted from the party's split over the issue of free trade (Joseph Chamberlain had resigned from government in September 1903 in order to campaign for Tariff Reform, which would allow "preferential tariffs"). Many working-class people at the time saw this as a threat to the price of food, hence the debate was nicknamed "Big Loaf, Little Loaf". Under Henry Campbell-Bannerman, the Liberals' landslide victory of 125 seats over all other parties led to the passing of social legislation known as the Liberal reforms.

It was the first election since the formation of the Conservative Party in which it won no seats in Wales. This would only occur again in the 1997, 2001 and 2024 general elections.

== Candidates ==
Below is a table summarising the candidates of the 1906 general election in Wales.

Affiliation	Candidates
Liberal Party	34 (Note: Includes Liberal-Labour candidates William Abraham in Rhondda, Clement Edwards in Denbigh Boroughs, William Brace in South Glamorganshire and Thomas Richards in West Monmouthshire.)
Conservative Party	17
Liberal Unionist Party	3 (Note: The candidates that stood were Vere Ponsonby in Carmarthen Boroughs, C. E. D. M. Richardson in Cardiganshire and James Fortescue Flannery in Cardiff.)
Labour Representation Committee	2 (Note: The candidates that stood were Keir Hardie in Merthyr Tydfil and James Whinstone in Monmouth Boroughs.)
Independent Liberal-Labour	1 (Note: Candidate John Williams stood in Gower.)
Total	57

== Analysis ==
=== Liberal Party ===
The Liberal Party under Henry Campbell-Bannerman saw a minor 1.7% increase in vote share, but with a net gain of 6 seats due to the collapse in support for the Conservative Party.

The Liberal Party retained the seats of Anglesey, Arfon, Eifion, East Denbighshire, Flint Boroughs, Flintshire, Merioneth, Montgomeryshire, Breconshire, Cardiganshire, Carmarthen Boroughs, East Carmarthenshire, West Carmarthenshire, West Denbighshire, Pembrokeshire, Radnorshire, Cardiff, Swansea Town, Caernarfon, East Glamorganshire, Rhondda, Mid Glamorganshire, Swansea District, North Monmouthshire and West Monmouthshire. The party also held one of the two seats in the two-member constituency of Merthyr Tydfil. It gained all remaining seats from the Conservative Party, however lost one to an independent.

Liberal candidate Ivor Herbert entered Parliament in South Monmouthshire, with the party winning the seat from the Conservatives. David Davies in Montgomeryshire, and thereby replacing a retiring Liberal MP, re-entering Parliament after having previously fought the 1886 general election in Cardiganshire as a Liberal Unionist after having held it as a Liberal in 1885 general election.

Like it had in previous elections, it had sponsored Liberal Labour candidates, who were official Liberal candidate but with support of certain unions. William Abraham in Rhondda had been such a winning candidate within the party since 1885 and had remained in support of the Liberals since at least the 1886 election. Further gains for these dual candidates came from gains from the Conservative Party. These were Clement Edwards in Denbigh Boroughs, William Brace in South Glamorganshire. Additionally, Thomas Richards in West Monmouthshire won the seat, replacing the Liberal MP at the 1904 West Monmouthshire by-election without facing any Liberal opposition. Such candidates were supported by the Liberals and themselves supported the party at the election. However, with the exception of Clement Edwards, all of such winning candidates would join the Labour Party following its official formation after the election.

=== Conservatives and Liberal Unionists ===
The Conservative Party saw a large swing against it of over 10.0% it primarily to the Liberal Party, with the Liberal Unionist Party gaining from standing more candidates than it had in the previous election. Overall, the alliance between the two parties saw an decrease in vote share and seats, leaving both the Conservative Party and Liberal Unionists without representation in Wales.

The Conservatives lost its remaining seats of Denbigh Boroughs, South Glamorganshire, Monmouth Boroughs, South Monmouthshire, Montgomery and Pembroke and Haverfordwest to the Liberal Party. It was the first election since the formation of the Conservative Party in which it won no seats in Wales. This would only occur again in the 1997, 2001 and 2024 general elections.

The Liberal Unionist Party, however, saw a swing in favour of it, owing very much to standing three candidates in this election as opposed to one in 1900. However, none of such candidates were successful. Vere Ponsonby stood in Carmarthen, only taking around a third of the vote, as had C. Richardson in Cardiganshire. James Fortescue Flannery in Cardiff was the most successful of the three, taking 40.0% of the vote, after having previously held Shipley from the 1895 until this election, however did not take the seat. The Liberal Unionists therefore did not gain representation again in Wales. Of note, there is a general conflict as to the candidature of Ponsonby and Flannery as to whether they stood as Conservatives or Liberal Unionists, however, later sources suggest in favour of each standing as Liberal Unionists at this election, particularly as Flannery had previous held a seat under that label.

=== Labour Representation Committee ===
The Labour Representation Committee, which had expanded to standing candidates in all four nations of the United Kingdom at this election, once again stood 2 in Wales. These were leader Keir Hardie in Merthyr Tydfil and James Whinstone in Monmouth Boroughs. Hardie was successful in retaining one of the two seats in Merthyr Tydfil. However, Whinstone was unsuccessful against the Liberal and Conservative candidates in the contest, achieving only just under 17.0% of the vote.

Overall, due to the fall in vote with the second candidate compared with the last election, and the nature of the multi-member constituency adjustment in Merthyr Tydfill, Labour saw a very minor decrease in vote share, but otherwise saw no change in terms of seats. As the Conservatives and Liberal Unionists held no seats in Wales, the Labour group technically placed second in terms of seats despite being a very distant fourth in terms of votes. The group would emerging as the Labour Party following the election.

=== Independent Liberal-Labour ===
Wales would, for the last time, see a successful Independent Liberal-Labour candidate, before the collapse of the movement. Candidate John Williams won the seat of Gower, standing against a Liberal candidate and therefore being classed as an independent rather than being any official Liberal. However, he would take the Liberal Whip following the election. This was the only technical loss for the Liberal Party in Wales in this election, despite William joining the party later. However, Williams, much like most of the sitting Liberal-Labour MPs would join the Labour Party before the January 1910 election, and win as such in that election.

== Results ==
Party	Seats					Aggregate votes		
Party	Total	Gains	Losses	Net	Of total (%)	Total	Of total (%) (Note: Adjusted for multi-member constituencies.)	Change (%)
Liberal	32 (Note: Includes 4 Liberal-Labour MPs.)	6	1	▲5	94.1	105,837	60.2	▲1.7
Conservative-Liberal Unionist	0	0	6	▼6	—	65,949	33.8	▼3.8
Conservative	0	0	6	▼6	—	51,752	25.9	▼10.6
Liberal Unionist	0	0	0	Steady	—	14,197	7.9	▲6.8
Labour Repr. Cmte.	1	0	0	Steady	2.9	11,865	3.5	▼0.4
Independent Liberal-Labour	1	Did not stand in 1900		▲1	2.9	4,841	2.5	—N/a
Total	34			0	100.0	211,116	100.0	0.0
Registered voters, and turnout						239,048 (Note: Electorate in contested constituencies. The total electorate was 387,535.)	82.6	▲6.2

=== Popular vote ===
Popular vote
Liberal	60.2%
Conservative	25.9%
Liberal Unionist	7.9%
Labour R. C.	3.5%
Ind. Lib-Lab	2.5%

Popular vote (alliances)
Liberal	60.2%
Con-LU	33.8%
Labour R. C.	3.5%
Ind. Lib-Lab	2.5%

=== Parliament seats ===
Parliament seats
Liberal	94.1%
Labour R. C.	2.9%
Ind. Lib-Lab	2.9%

Parliament seats (alliances)
Liberal	94.1%
Labour R. C.	2.9%
Ind. Lib-Lab	2.9%

== See also ==
- 1906 United Kingdom general election in England
- 1906 United Kingdom general election in Ireland
- 1906 United Kingdom general election in Scotland
- List of United Kingdom Parliament constituencies (1885–1918) by region
- List of MPs for constituencies in Wales (1906–January 1910)
