= Mary Keating Hill =

Welsh suffragette (1863–1929)

- Born: 1863; Mountain Ash, Rhondda Cynon Taf, Cynon Valley, Wales
- Died: 1929 (aged 65–66)
- Organization(s): Women's Social and Political Union; Women's Freedom League
- Political party: Independent Labour Party

Mary Keating Hill (1863–1929) was a Welsh suffragette and labour campaigner. She was the first Welsh woman to be imprisoned for the cause of women's suffrage.

== Biography ==
Hill was born in 1863 in Mountain Ash, Rhondda Cynon Taf, Cynon Valley, Wales, the daughter of labourer Cornelius Keating and his wife Mary. Her family were a working-class and immigrant Irish family. One of her six siblings was Joseph Keating (1871–1934), the miner turned novelist, journalist, and social commentator.

Hill worked as a milliner. She married insurance agent George Hill on 15 August 1894 and they moved to Cardiff.

Hill was an early member of the Cardiff branch of the Women's Social and Political Union (WSPU). In October 1906, she campaigned against Liberal candidate Samuel Evans in the Mid Glamorgan by-election.

Hill attempted to make a speech in favour of suffrage in London and was subsequently imprisoned in HM Holloway Prison on 18 December 1906, spending three weeks in jail for "resisting the police and disorderly conduct." She was the first Welsh woman to be imprisoned for the cause of women's suffrage and said to the Evening Express newspaper that: "I should not like gallant little Wales to be left out in the cold regarding this movement. I hope that if necessity arises there will be many more women in Wales willing and ready to follow my example. When the French threatened to invade our land, the women of South Wales took their places and marched along the coast amongst the defenders. That spirit should animate us now." Hill had been given a similar conviction days prior to her imprisonment, but her brother had paid the fine of 40 shillings against her wishes.

When Hill was released from prison in January 1907, she was met by suffragists Emmeline Pethick-Lawrence and Minnie Baldock, who presented her with flowers, and she was also a known friend of Emmeline Pankhurst and her daughters.

In May 1907, Hill attempted to hold a meeting outside of the Cardiff Workhouse, which ended after 40 minutes due to interruptions from the crowd.

In 1909, Hill was one of the founding members of the Cardiff branch of the Women's Freedom League (WFL). She was appointed as branch secretary. In 1910, Hill addressed two open air meetings in Aberdare on behalf of the WFL, which was reported on by the South Wales Daily News.

During World War I, Hill told a Cardiff meeting that it was necessary to "keep the flag flying" for women's suffrage. After the war, Hill and her brother Joseph campaigned for the Independent Labour Party (ILP). In 1912, she was appointed as the inaugural president of the Cardiff ILP's women's guild.

Hill died in 1929.
