= Mid Glamorganshire =

Mid Glamorganshire may refer to:

- Mid Glamorgan, a historic county of Wales
- Mid Glamorganshire (UK Parliament constituency)
