= Frederick William Gibbins =

Frederick William Gibbins (1 April 1861 – 30 July 1937) was a Welsh businessman and Liberal Party politician.

== Family and education ==
Gibbins was born in Neath, the eldest son of F J Gibbins, a local Justice of the Peace. He was educated privately but also attended the Quaker School in Scarborough. In 1898 he married Sarah Jennet Rhys, the daughter of Jenkin Rhys of Ysguborfawr, Breconshire. They had two sons. In religion Gibbins was a devout member of the Society of Friends.

== Career ==
Gibbins main business concern was tinplate manufacturing. He entered the tinplate trade in 1880 and was assistant manager at the Ynispenllwch works in 1884. In 1890 he erected and managed the Eagle Tinplate works at Melyn in Neath. He was regarded as a model employer in his industry. He provided his workers with a canteen, a lending library as well as other recreational facilities. He was also looked upon as fair-minded and was often asked to act as an arbitrator in trades disputes. He was one of the founders of the Welsh Plate and Sheet Manufacturers' Association and was its chairman from 1910 to 1922. In the years after the First World War however small, independent, tinplate makers faced difficult economic conditions and, like others in the trade, Gibbins withdrew from production. After 31 years in the business he sold out to Baldwin Ltd in 1921 making well over £100,000. He went on to develop interests in the insurance industry, becoming a director of the London and Scottish Assurance Corporation and he was sometime chairman of the Welsh Insurance Corporation.

== Politics ==
In 1910 the sitting Liberal MP for the constituency of Mid Glamorganshire, Samuel Thomas Evans resigned his seat to take up the post of President of the Probate, Divorce and Admiralty Division of the High Court of Justice. This resulted in a by-election and the Mid Glamorgan Liberal and Labour Association selected Gibbins to fight the seat. Gibbins was initially reluctant having given certain private assurances that he would not contest the election but he was prevailed upon to change his mind and having consulted his close friends (and perhaps getting the permission of his wife), he agreed to stand. The by-election was acrimonious because it signalled a rupture between the Liberals and organised Labour in the area, especially the South Wales Miners Federation. It also caused internal conflicts within the South Wales Miners Federation, with William Brace, their Vice-President, opposing the intervention of a Labour candidate. It also caused internal conflicts for the Liberal Party as the local Association had been put under pressure by the Liberal Chief Whip, the Master of Elibank. Elibank wanted the Liberals to stand aside in favour of a Labour candidate in the interests of good relations with Labour at Westminster where the Liberal government now depended on Labour and the Irish Nationalists. However, the Liberals in Mid Glamorgan did not wish to yield the seat and determined to fight it. With tacit Unionist support given to him in a campaign characterised by anti-socialist rhetoric, Gibbins held the seat for the Liberals with a majority of 2,710 against a strong Labour challenge from Vernon Hartshorn a prominent miners’ official who later sat as Labour MP for Ogmore.

However, in the words of historian Brinley Richards, "the hurly-burly of Parliamentary life was not to [Gibbins’] liking." He served as MP only a few months, standing down at the general election in December 1910. Thereafter he concentrated on business, industrial relations and philanthropy.

== Other appointments ==
Gibbins was typical of the late Victorian and Edwardian Liberal political class. He served on committees, commercial and philanthropic. He was appointed a Justice of the Peace for the county of Glamorgan. He was an ardent upholder of hospital work and a vice-president of the Welsh National Memorial Association. He served as High Sheriff of Glamorgan for 1908.

In 1911 the Board of Trade set up an Industrial Council to act as a National Conciliation Council in relation to labour and trade disputes. Gibbins was appointed to sit on the Council as one of the employers’ representatives.

In 1916 Gibbins was appointed a member of the Appeal Tribunal for Glamorgan under the Military Service Act 1916 which introduced conscription. Under the Act those liable to be called up were entitled to apply to a local (borough or district) tribunal for exemption on grounds of conscientious objection, domestic hardship or that they were key workers in industry; if dissatisfied with the result, they could appeal to the county tribunal. One factor in Gibbins' appointment may have been his Quaker upbringing, as he would have had knowledge of religious objection.

== Death ==
In 1922, Gibbins went to live at Cwm Irfon Lodge, Llanwrtyd Wells. He later moved again to Glynsaer, Llandovery where he died on 30 July 1937 aged 76. He was buried at Cynghordy, near Llandovery.

Parliament of the United Kingdom
Preceded by Samuel Evans	Member of Parliament for Mid Glamorgan; March 1910 – December 1910	Succeeded by Hugh Edwards
