= John Bryn Roberts =

Welsh lawyer and politician

Bryn Roberts

John Bryn Roberts (8 January 1843 – 14 April 1931) was a Welsh lawyer, later a judge and Liberal politician.

== Family and education ==
Roberts was born the eldest son of Daniel Roberts from Llanddeilionen, near Bangor, a Caernarfonshire tenant farmer on the Vaynol estate and Anne Jones of Plas Gwanas, Merionethshire. The family were modestly well-off and could afford to employ a maidservant. Daniel Roberts was later able to buy his own farm at Trefarthen on Anglesey, as well as fourteen cottages at Llanrug, share-holdings in public utilities and part-ownership of a schooner plying the coastal freight-trade. In religion the family were Calvinistic Methodists. John Bryn Roberts never married.

John received private tuition at home and was then sent to Cheltenham Grammar School.

== Career ==
In 1860 John Roberts went to Chester to study land surveying but in 1863 he took over the management of his father's old tenant farm at Bryn Adda, south of Bangor. Soon afterwards his brother, Hugh, who had been working in a solicitor's office in Caernarfon told John he was unhappy there and John offered him the management of the farm in return for his job with the solicitor. John took to the staid business of the law, which his brother had so found so stultifying, and decided to make it his career. In 1868 he passed his law examinations with distinction and received the Clifford's Inn prize from the Incorporated Law Society. He set up practice in Bangor and Llangefni on the North Wales Circuit, choosing to live at the family farm at Bryn Adda. In 1889, he was called to the Bar at Lincoln's Inn. In 1906 he was appointed a county court judge in Glamorgan, although the possibility of a judgeship had apparently been mooted as early as 1886 and he rose to become a Deputy Chairman of Quarter Sessions. Roberts was transferred to the North Wales and Chester circuit in 1918 until his retirement in 1921. As a judge he heard a number of hard cases involving industrial and workmen's compensation law and in the heady atmosphere of industrial relations of this time, against the background of the Taff Vale judgement he acquired a reputation, especially within the South Wales Miners Federation, for being anti-union and anti-labour. However, Roberts' biographer, Jack Eaton, cites from a number of Roberts' cases and rulings on appeal which he believes indicates these anti-labour accusations are incorrect. Eaton does however concede that Roberts was 'nonplussed' by the legislation on workmen's compensation.

== Entering politics ==
Roberts' nonconformity, his work in the law for the rights of tenant farmers against the Tory landowners and his own ideas about Free Trade and self-help predisposed him towards the Liberal Party and his education and position in North Wales society attracted the party to him. In 1882 he was approached about the possibility of standing for Parliament as Liberal candidate in Caernarfon Boroughs which was later to become the fiefdom of David Lloyd George. In 1884 he was asked to stand for Anglesey and he eventually agreed to be nominated for the new seat of Eifion or South Caernarvonshire which was being created for the 1885 general election. Roberts' selection as Liberal candidate for Eifion was contested and not without controversy. Supporters of his Congregationalist opponent, R Pughe Jones, complained that no meeting of the whole local Liberal Association had been called and that only the delegates, who were predominantly Methodists like Roberts, had been asked for their opinion.

== The 1885 general election ==
Despite these objections, Roberts was selected to be the Liberal candidate and his 1885 election address emphasised his support for the disestablishment of the Anglican Church in Wales, the expansion of intermediate education, land reform, reform of the legal system, Free Trade, improved Parliamentary procedures to restrict Tory and Irish Nationalist obstructionism and his anti-war, anti-imperialist beliefs.

Another issue in the election was an industrial dispute at the Dinorwic Quarry but which was complicated by being interpreted as, as much an attack by the proprietor and local landowner on the religion and class of his workers, as a conflict over wages and conditions.

Despite suffering from a speech impediment which restricted his ability as a political orator, Roberts was an effective enough candidate and the result of the election was a victory over his Conservative opponent, a member of the local squirearchy, Hugh Ellis-Nanney, by 4,535 votes to 2,573 on a turnout of 80%. Ellis-Nanney later suffered another Parliamentary defeat when he failed to hold the Conservative seat of Caernarvon Boroughs in a by-election held on 10 April 1890 when his opponent was David Lloyd George.

== Politics, 1885–1906 ==
Roberts held his seat at Eifion at every general election until he resigned as an MP in June 1906 upon his appointment as a county court judge. During his time in Parliament, Roberts was a noted orthodox Gladstonian and was hostile to the radical, nationalist group of Welsh MPs like Lloyd George and the supporters of Cymru Fydd. In fact he was highly critical of Lloyd George and Cymru Fydd and publicly accused Lloyd George of conspiring with the Tories and Parnellites in his disestablishment rebellion of May 1895, commenting that this was a prime factor in the downfall of Lord Rosebery's government at the general election of 1895. The Welsh Unionists performed well in this election gaining six Liberal seats and reducing Liberal majorities across many constituencies, explaining the ferocity of Roberts’ attack on Lloyd George. It is little wonder that in his later political life he was described as an Asquithian Liberal. However Roberts and Lloyd George were as one in their opposition to the Boer War. with Roberts being described as a ‘sentimental politician’ on the issue and a member of the ‘extreme peace party’. Some historians have disparaged Roberts as complacent and plodding, noted his tendency to put on airs and graces or pointed out an inherent cautiousness. In the view of John Grigg, Roberts was “too awkward” to succeed, never becoming a minister or rising higher than a county court judge despite having a good political mind and being an excellent lawyer. His decision to resign in 1906 and accept the offer of the county court judgeship has been seen by some as an escape from the coming radical Liberal politics with which he found little favour.

== Other appointments ==
Roberts was a Justice of the Peace and a county Alderman of Caernarfonshire and in 1897 he was appointed Deputy Lieutenant for the county.

== Death ==
Roberts died at his home, Bryn Adda, at the age of 88 years on 14 April 1931.

== Papers ==
A large collection of Roberts' private papers, letters and diaries have been deposited at the National Library of Wales in Aberystwyth. They have been used extensively by Jack Eaton in his biography of Roberts. Eaton says that there is some indication in the papers that Roberts began an attempt to write his memoirs but never completed the task.

Parliament of the United Kingdom
New constituency	Member of Parliament for Eifion; 1885–June 1906	Succeeded by Ellis William Davies
