= J. Hugh Edwards =

British politician

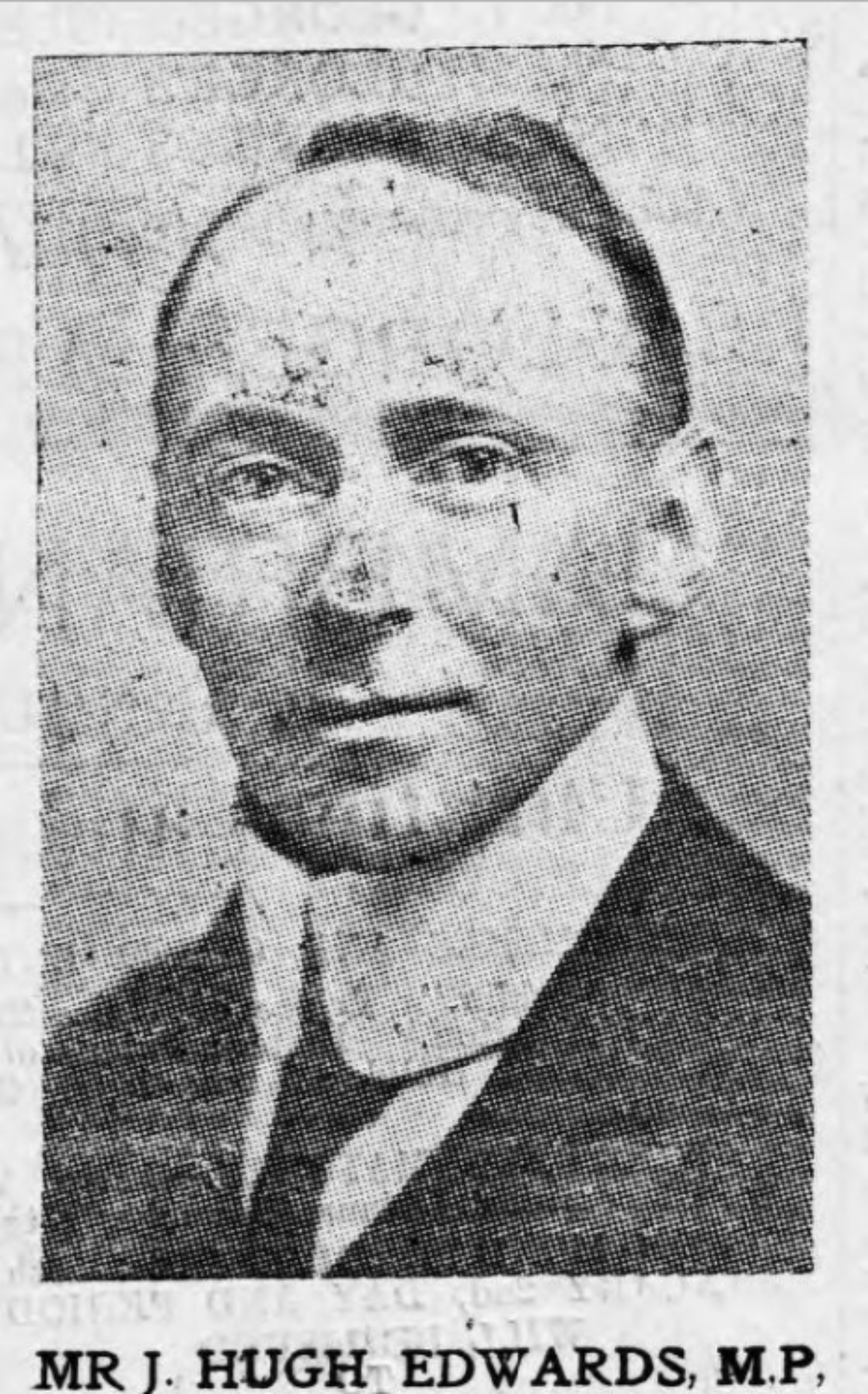
J. Hugh Edwards

(John) Hugh Edwards (9 April 1869 – 14 June 1945) was a British Liberal Party politician and author.

Aberystwyth-born Edwards was an author, having written a history of Wales and three biographies of David Lloyd George. He was a governor of University College of Wales, Aberystwyth and University College Cardiff. He was the editor of the magazines Young Wales, Welsh Review and Wales: a National Magazine, Liberal Welsh nationalist magazines. Prior to this, he served as a Congregationalist Minister in Montgomeryshire and London.

Edwards was a supporter of the 'Cymru Fydd', or 'Young Wales' Movement of the 1890s, one of a number of South Walians who supported Lloyd George's attempt to create a united Welsh nationalist movement. He was present at the Newport Meeting of the South Wales Liberal Federation, in which the scheme for unity went down to defeat.

Edwards was elected Member of Parliament (MP) for Mid Glamorgan at the December 1910 general election, with a majority of more than 1,500 over a Labour Party candidate. In the years before the First World War, J. Hugh Edwards became well known for his anti-Socialist campaigning. In 1918, after extensive changes to the Glamorgan Parliamentary boundaries, J. Hugh Edwards was returned for Neath with a majority of more than 8,000 votes over the Labour candidate. At the 1922 general election, Edwards lost his seat to William Jenkins, a miners' leader and chairman of Glamorgan County Council who won a 6,235 majority over Edwards. Although a Welsh nationalist, J. Hugh Edwards would never sit for a Welsh seat again, a sign of the weakening Liberal grip on Wales.

Edwards was elected Member of Parliament for Accrington in 1923. In 1924 he was one of a small number of Liberals, including Winston Churchill and Hamar Greenwood, to contest the General Election as Constitutionalist candidates. These Liberals advocated closer ties between Liberals and Conservatives. Edwards' candidature in Accrington was supported by both parties' local associations. After the elections when it appeared that there was no prospect of formal closer ties between the two parties, Edwards re-took the Liberal whip.

At the 1929 general election, Edwards stood as the Liberal candidate and was again not opposed by the local Conservatives; however he was narrowly defeated by Labour. After leaving Parliament Edwards married Doris, daughter of Sir Samuel Faire, a Leicester industrialist and local politician at a ceremony attended by David Lloyd George. The couple lived at Hindhead where Edwards was an active member of the Free Church Council. He died in a nursing home at Virginia Water, Surrey, aged 76, having suffered senile dementia in his last years. In his will, Edwards left a bequest to Martyn Lloyd-Jones.

== Selected works ==
- From Village Green to Downing Street - the Life of the Rt Hon D. Lloyd George with Spencer Leigh Hughes, London, George Newnes & Co, 1908
- The Life of David Lloyd George, with A Short History of the Welsh People with an introduction by David Brynmor Jones, 4 volumes, London, The Waverley Book Company, 1913
- David Lloyd George - The Man and the Statesman with an introduction by the Marquess of Lothian, 2 volumes, London, The Waverley Book Company, 1930

== Sources ==
- Davies, William Llewelyn (2001). "Edwards, John Hugh (1869-1945)". Dictionary of Welsh Biography. National Library of Wales.
- Gerard Charmley, ‘Edwards, John Hugh (1869–1945)’, Oxford Dictionary of National Biography, Oxford University Press, May 2011 , accessed 23 Jan 2013 (online ed.). Oxford University Press

Parliament of the United Kingdom
Preceded by Frederick William Gibbins	Member of Parliament for Mid Glamorgan; 1910–1918	constituency abolished
New constituency	Member of Parliament for Neath; 1918–1922	Succeeded by William Jenkins
Preceded by Charles Buxton	Member of Parliament for Accrington; 1923–1929	Succeeded by Tom Snowden
