= 1910 Mid Glamorgan by-election =

UK parliamentary by-election

The 1910 Mid Glamorganshire by-election was held on 31 March 1910. The by-election was held due to the incumbent Liberal MP, Samuel Thomas Evans becoming President of the Probate and Divorce Division of the High Court of Justice. It was won by the Liberal-Labour candidate Frederick Gibbins.

The Mid Glamorgan Liberal and Labour Association selected Frederick Gibbins to fight the seat. Gibbins was initially reluctant having given certain private assurances that he would not contest the election but he was prevailed upon to change his mind and having consulted his close friends (and perhaps getting the permission of his wife), he agreed to stand. The by-election was acrimonious because it signalled a rupture between the Liberals and organised Labour in the area, especially the South Wales Miners Federation. It also caused internal conflicts within the South Wales Miners Federation, with William Brace, their Vice-President, opposing the intervention of a Labour candidate. It also caused internal conflicts for the Liberal Party as the local Association had been put under pressure by the Liberal Chief Whip, the Master of Elibank. Elibank wanted the Liberals to stand aside in favour of a Labour candidate in the interests of good relations with Labour at Westminster where the Liberal government now depended on Labour and the Irish Nationalists. However, the Liberals in Mid Glamorgan did not wish to yield the seat and determined to fight it. With tacit Unionist support given to him in a campaign characterised by anti-socialist rhetoric, Gibbins held the seat for the Liberals with a majority of 2,710 against a strong Labour challenge from Vernon Hartshorn a prominent miners’ official who later sat as Labour MP for Ogmore.

1910 Mid Glamorganshire by-election
Party	Candidate	Votes	%	±%
Lib-Lab	Frederick William Gibbins	8,920	59.0	−20.6
Labour	Vernon Hartshorn	6,210	41.0	N/A
Majority		2,710	18.0	−41.2
Turnout		15,130	75.6	−7.1
Registered electors		20,017		
Lib-Lab hold		Swing	-10.3	
