= Samuel Evans (British politician) =

British politician and Judge (1859–1918)

The Right Honourable Sir Samuel Evans GCB
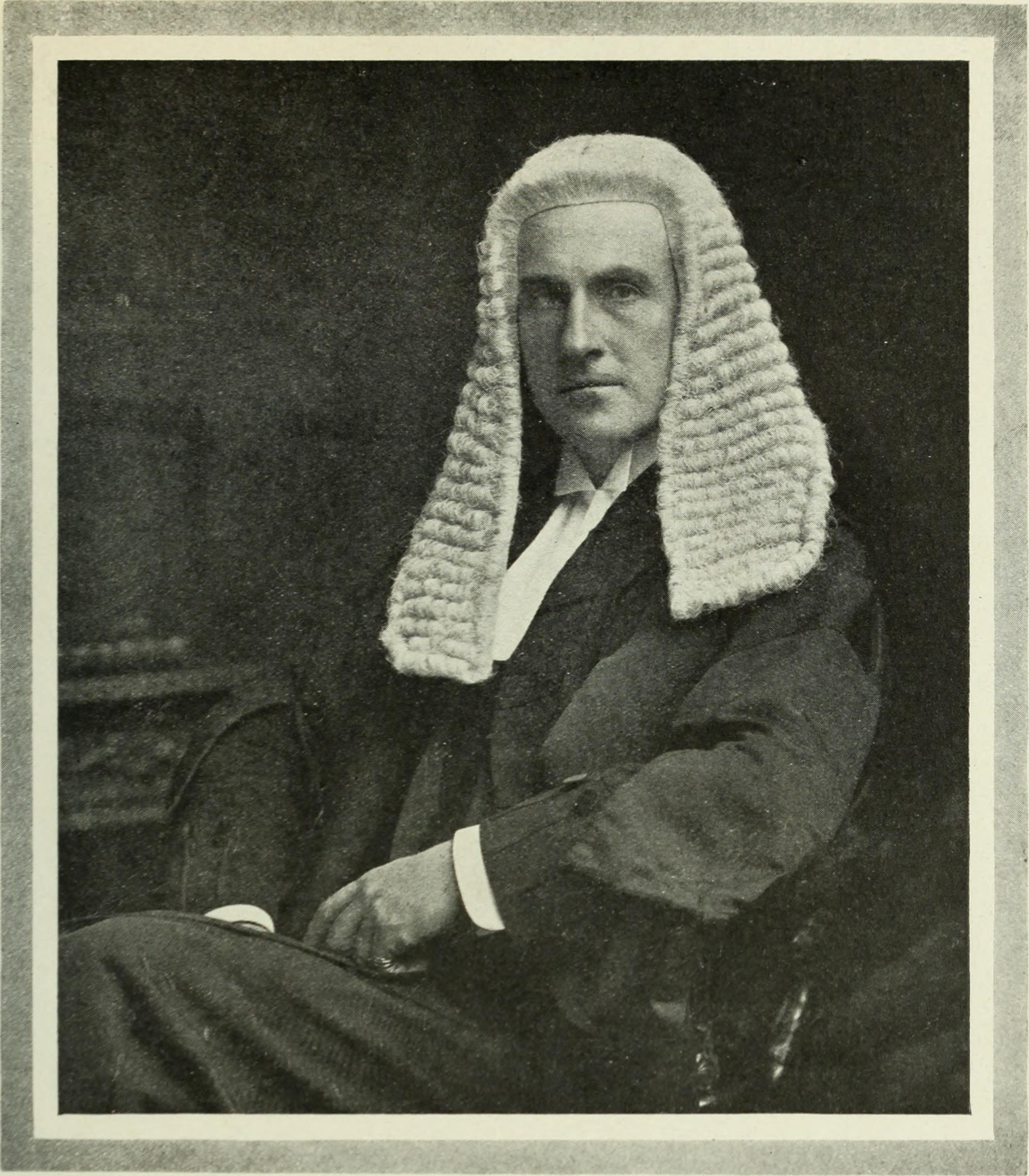
- Sir Samuel Thomas Evans in The Times History of the War (1914)

Member of Parliament for Mid Glamorgan
- In office 1890–1910
- Preceded by: Christopher Rice Mansel Talbot
- Succeeded by: Frederick William Gibbins

President of the Probate, Divorce and Admiralty Division
- In office 9 March 1910 – 13 September 1918
- Preceded by: Sir John Bigham
- Succeeded by: The Lord Sterndale

Personal details
- Born: 4 May 1859 Skewen, Glamorganshire, Wales
- Died: 13 September 1918 (aged 59)
- Party: Liberal Party
- Spouse(s): Rachel Thomas (m. 1887; died 1889) Blanche Rule (m. 1905)
- Children: 2

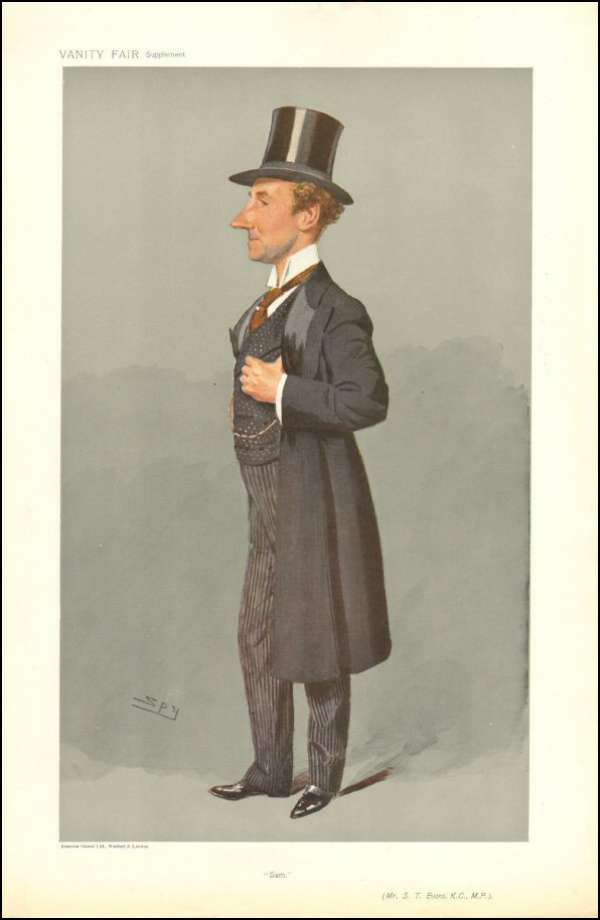
"Sam", caricature by Spy in Vanity Fair in 1908.

Sir Samuel Thomas Evans GCB PC (4 May 1859 – 13 September 1918) was a Welsh barrister, judge and Liberal politician.

== Background and education ==
Evans was born at Skewen, near Neath, Glamorganshire, the only son of John Evans, a grocer, and his wife Margaret, both originally of Cardiganshire. He was educated in Swansea, at University College, Aberystwyth, and the University of London.

== Family ==
Evans married firstly Rachel, daughter of William Thomas, in 1887. They had one son. After his first wife's death in 1889 he married secondly Blanche, daughter of Charles Rule, in 1905. They had one daughter.

== Legal career ==
He qualified as a solicitor in 1883. On 28 April 1891 he was admitted to the Middle Temple and on 10 June 1891 he was called to the Bar. Evans gained a large practice on the South Wales circuit and in 1901 he became the last QC appointed by Queen Victoria. He served on the Neath Town Council during the 1880s. He was a Recorder of Swansea from 1906 to 1908 and became a Bencher of the Middle Temple in 1908. His reputation as a judge rests mostly on his role as President of the Prize Court established during the First World War.

== Political career ==
In 1889, Evans sought election to the inaugural Glamorgan County Council but was unsuccessful both at the initial election and the by-election which followed the successful Conservative candidate's elevation to the aldermanic bench.

In 1890 he was elected to the House of Commons for Mid Glamorgan. He combined his parliamentary work with his legal practice in Wales. In 1900 it was said that he "began his Parliamentary career with some brilliant displays but has of late given the House fewere and rarer tastes of his quality. (He) first won his Parliamentary Spurs over the Church Discipline Bill, in which he showed a strength and sureness in debate which brought him out with credit even from contests with the great Gladstone himself. But of late years he has been drawn off, like so many promising young Parliamentarians, to his work at the Bar, and the circuits have claimed much that was meant for the House of Commons."

He was re-elected in 1892, 1895 and at the Khaki General Election of 1900. He seconded the motion for a full inquiry into the Jameson Raid.

At the General Election of January/February 1906 he was returned unopposed. In October 1906 upon appointment as Recorder of Swansea, an office of profit under the Crown, he was required to seek re-election and in the by-election he was returned unopposed. In 1908, he was appointed Solicitor-General in the Liberal administration of H. H. Asquith and knighted upon taking office.

He was re-elected at the following general election, in January 1910.

He was then sworn of the Privy Council in 1910. In March 1910 Evans decided to give up his political career and accept the post of President of the Probate, Divorce and Admiralty Division of the High Court of Justice. His appointment was not popular with the legal establishment as he was considered to have little experience in these fields. He was appointed a GCB in 1916. However, he declined the offer of a peerage.

Evans died in September 1918 aged 59 and was buried at Skewen.

== Electoral results ==
General election 25 September - 24 October 1900: Mid Glamorganshire
Party	Candidate	Votes	%	±%
Liberal	Samuel Evans	7,027	75.8	
Conservative	H.Phillips	2,244	24.2	
Majority		4,783	51.6	
Turnout		9,271	67.8	
Liberal hold		Swing		

General election 15 January - 20 February 1910: Mid Glamorganshire
Party	Candidate	Votes	%	±%
Liberal	Samuel Evans	13,175	79.6	+3.8
Conservative	Godfrey Williams	3,382	20.4	−3.8
Majority		9,793	59.2	+7.6
Turnout		16,557	82.7	'
Liberal hold		Swing	+3.8	

== Sources ==
=== Books and Journals ===
- Davis, H. W. C.; Weaver, J. R. H. The Dictionary of National Biography. 1912-1921. Oxford University Press.

=== Online ===
- Llewelfryn Davies, D.J. "Sir Samuel Thomas Evans". Dictionary of Welsh Biography. National Library of Wales.

=== Other ===
- Leigh Rayment's Peerage Page

Parliament of the United Kingdom
Preceded by Christopher Rice Mansel Talbot	Member of Parliament for Glamorgan Mid; 1890–1910	Succeeded by Frederick William Gibbins
Legal offices
Preceded by Sir William Robson	Solicitor-General; 1908–1910	Succeeded by Sir Rufus Isaacs
