= Ellis Davies (politician) =

Welsh politician and lawyer (1871–1939)

Ellis William Davies

Ellis William Davies (12 April 1871 – 29 April 1939) was a Welsh Liberal Party and later, briefly, Labour Party and Liberal National politician and lawyer.

== Early life and work ==
Davies was born at Gerlan, Bethesda, Caernarfonshire, the son of David Davies a quarry official. He was educated in Bethesda and at Liverpool College. He worked as a clerk in insurance offices in Wrexham and Sheffield until he qualified as a solicitor in 1899. He passed his final Law Society examination with first-class honours, winning the Law Society prize in 1899, after which he established a law practice in Caernarfon where he lived for the rest of his life. He was also director of several companies and solicitor for the North Wales Quarrymen's Union. He died at Caernarfon in 1939. He founded the Caernarfon solicitor firm - 'Ellis-Davies and Co' that is still in existence today and has his great-grandson as one of the partners.

== Politics ==
A political radical, Davies was elected to Caernarfonshire County Council in 1904, later becoming an alderman. He entered Parliament in June 1906 when he was returned unopposed in a by-election for the Eifion division of Caernarfonshire, when the former Member of Parliament John Bryn Roberts was appointed a county court judge. Eifion had been held by Roberts, a Liberal in the Gladstonian tradition, since its creation for the 1885 general election and at the 1906 general election Roberts had also been returned unopposed. Davies retained the Eifion constituency until 1918.

During his years in Parliament, Davies sat on committees investigating land reform, the jury system, reform of the electoral system, compulsory purchases by local authorities, and reform of the House of Lords. He returned to Parliament as MP for Denbigh in 1923, but resigned in 1929 on grounds of ill health. In 1932, he was prominent in the discussions of the Presbyterian Church of Wales on formulating a parliamentary bill relating to the church.

== Davies and Lloyd George ==
During the First World War, Davies was one of a number of Welsh MPs who broke with Prime Minister David Lloyd George over his conduct of the war. Davies regarded Lloyd George's ministry as bellicose and illiberal, conflicting with his own strongly held pacifist and pro-labour views. Although Ellis Davies was never really close to Lloyd George he knew him quite well being a Caernarfonshire MP and his journal records a number of occasions when they discussed political questions or worked together on specific projects. At the 1918 general election Davies, as a supporter of the Asquithian Liberals, did not receive the coalition coupon and was heavily defeated, coming bottom of the poll.

== Labour and Liberal Nationals ==
Davies joined the Labour Party in 1936, only to leave early in 1939 because of its foreign policy. He believed that Neville Chamberlain’s policy of appeasement was more likely to keep the peace than Labour's support for intervention abroad. As a supporter of social reform, he felt that there was plenty of work to be done to improve social conditions at home and this could not be done if the country was at war. He then chose to associate himself with the Liberal Nationals, the allies of Chamberlain's Conservative government, although at the age of 68 years it was probably not in the hope of finding another seat.

== Papers ==
The papers of Ellis Davies, 1889–1939, comprising his diaries, journals, correspondence, press cuttings, addresses, articles and memoirs, together with printed and typescript memoranda, reports, policy documents and official publications are deposited at the National Library of Wales.

Parliament of the United Kingdom
Preceded by John Bryn Roberts	Member of Parliament for Eifion; 1906 – 1918	Constituency abolished
Preceded by John Cledwyn Davies	Member of Parliament for Denbigh; 1923 – 1929	Succeeded by Henry Morris-Jones
Party political offices
Preceded by New position	President of the Welsh Liberal Federation; 1921–1922	Succeeded by Henry Gladstone
Preceded by ?	Chairman of the Welsh Liberal Federation; 1922–1925	Succeeded by John Hinds
