= 1906 Eifion by-election =

UK Parliamentary by-election

The 1906 Eifion by-election was held on 5 June 1906. The by-election was held due to the resignation of the incumbent Liberal MP, John Bryn Roberts to become a county court judge. It was won by the Liberal candidate Ellis William Davies.

Roberts' decision to resign in 1906 and accept the offer of the County Court Judgeship has been seen by some as an escape from the coming radical Liberal politics with which he found little favour.

1906 Eifion by-election
Party	Candidate	Votes	%	±%
Liberal	Ellis William Davies	Unopposed		
Registered electors				
Liberal hold				
