= 1904 West Monmouthshire by-election =

UK parliamentary by-election

← 1900	3 November 1904	1906 →

Candidate	Richards	Cockburn
Party	Lib-Lab	Independent
Popular vote	7,995	3,360
Percentage	70.4%	29.6%
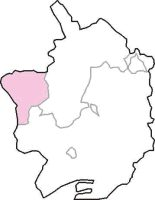
MP before election
Sir William Harcourt
Liberal
Subsequent MP
Thomas Richards
Lib-Lab

The 1904 West Monmouthshire by-election was a parliamentary by-election held on 3 November 1904. The constituency returned one Member of Parliament (MP) to the House of Commons of the United Kingdom, elected by the first past the post voting system.

The seat was vacant following the death of the seat's incumbent MP Sir William Vernon Harcourt. Thomas Richards was elected in his place.

Harcourt

General election 1900: West Monmouthshire
Party	Candidate	Votes	%	±%
Liberal	William Vernon Harcourt	5,976	71.3	−7.4
Conservative	Iltyd William Henry Gardner	2,401	28.7	+7.4
Majority		3,575	42.6	−14.8
Turnout		8,377	75.1	−5.1
Registered electors		11,150		
Liberal hold		Swing	-7.4	

== Result ==
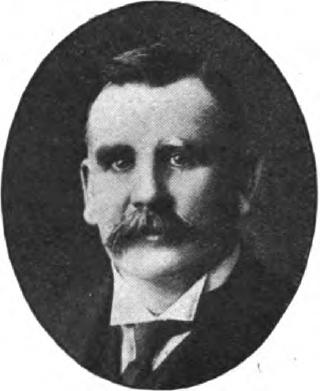
Richards

1904 West Monmouthshire by-election
Party	Candidate	Votes	%	±%
Lib-Lab	Thomas Richards	7,995	70.4	−0.9
Independent	John Cockburn	3,360	29.6	N/A
Majority		4,635	40.8	−1.8
Turnout		11,355	75.1	±0.0
Registered electors		15,127		
Lib-Lab hold		Swing		

- supported Tariff Reform

General election 1906: West Monmouthshire
Party	Candidate	Votes	%	±%
Lib-Lab	Thomas Richards	Unopposed		
Registered electors				
Lib-Lab hold				
