= Eifion (UK Parliament constituency) =

UK Parliament constituency (1885–1918)

- Former constituency for the House of Commons

1885–1918
- Seats: one
- Created from: Caernarvonshire
- Replaced by: Caernarvonshire

Eifion was a parliamentary constituency in Caernarfonshire, Wales. It returned one Member of Parliament (MP) to the House of Commons of the Parliament of the United Kingdom, elected by the first past the post system.

== History ==
The constituency was created by the Redistribution of Seats Act 1885 for the 1885 general election, and abolished for the 1918 general election.

== Boundaries ==
Eifion covered the southern part of Caernarvonshire. It included the Sessional Divisions of Eifionydd (or Portmadoc) and Pwllheli (excluding the boroughs of Caernarvon and Pwllheli and the parishes of Criccieth and Nevin) and part of the Sessional Division of Caernarvon (excluding the parishes of Llanberis and Llanddeiniolen).

== Members of Parliament ==
Election	Member	Party
1885	John Bryn Roberts	Liberal
1906	Ellis William Davies	Liberal
1918	constituency abolished	

== Elections ==
=== Elections in the 1880s ===
Roberts

General election 1885: Eifion
Party	Candidate	Votes	%	±%
Liberal	John Bryn Roberts	4,535	63.8	
Conservative	Hugh Ellis-Nanney	2,573	36.2	
Majority		1,962	27.6	
Turnout		7,108	79.2	
Registered electors		8,978		
Liberal win (new seat)				

General election 1886: Eifion
Party	Candidate	Votes	%	±%
Liberal	John Bryn Roberts	4,244	77.0	+13.2
Liberal Unionist	George Farren	1,267	23.0	−13.2
Majority		2,977	54.0	+26.4
Turnout		5,511	61.4	−17.8
Registered electors		8,978		
Liberal hold		Swing	+13.2	

=== Elections in the 1890s ===
General election 1892: Eifion
Party	Candidate	Votes	%	±%
Liberal	John Bryn Roberts	4,567	69.8	−7.2
Conservative	William Humphreys	1,973	30.2	+7.2
Majority		2,594	39.6	−14.4
Turnout		6,540	67.9	+6.5
Registered electors		9,630		
Liberal hold		Swing	-7.2	

General election 1895: Eifion
Party	Candidate	Votes	%	±%
Liberal	John Bryn Roberts	Unopposed		
Liberal hold				

=== Elections in the 1900s ===
General election 1900: Eifion
Party	Candidate	Votes	%	±%
Liberal	John Bryn Roberts	Unopposed		
Liberal hold				

General election 1906: Eifion
Party	Candidate	Votes	%	±%
Liberal	John Bryn Roberts	Unopposed		
Liberal hold				

1906 Eifion by-election
Party	Candidate	Votes	%	±%
Liberal	Ellis William Davies	Unopposed		
Liberal hold				

=== Elections in the 1910s ===
General election January 1910: Eifion
Party	Candidate	Votes	%	±%
Liberal	Ellis William Davies	6,118	78.3	N/A
Conservative	Francis John Lloyd Priestly	1,700	21.7	New
Majority		4,418	56.6	N/A
Turnout		7,818	82.7	N/A
Liberal hold				

General election December 1910: Eifion
Party	Candidate	Votes	%	±%
Liberal	Ellis William Davies	Unopposed		
Liberal hold				

General Election 1914–15:

Another General Election was required to take place before the end of 1915. The political parties had been making preparations for an election to take place and by July 1914, the following candidates had been selected;

- Liberal: Ellis William Davies
- Unionist:
- Ind. Liberal: W.O. Jones
