= West Monmouthshire (UK Parliament constituency) =

UK Parliament constituency (1885–1918)

Western Monmouthshire
- Former county constituency for the House of Commons

1885–1918
- Seats: one
- Created from: Monmouthshire
- Replaced by: Abertillery, Bedwellty and Ebbw Vale

Western Monmouthshire (also known as the Western Division of the County of Monmouth) was a parliamentary constituency in Monmouthshire, Wales. It returned one Member of Parliament (MP) to the House of Commons of the Parliament of the United Kingdom.

== History ==
The constituency was created by the Redistribution of Seats Act 1885 for the 1885 general election. It was abolished for the 1918 general election.

== Boundaries ==
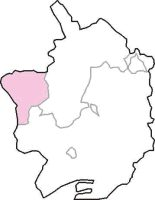
The constituency (shown in pink) within Monmouthshire

The constituency was defined as comprising the "Sessional Division of Bedwellty (except the Parishes of Bedwas and Mynyddislwyn)", and thus constituted the following civil parishes:

- Abertillery
- Aberystruth (including part of Ebbw Vale)
- Bedwellty (including Manmoel, Rhymney, Tredegar and part of Ebbw Vale)

On abolition by the Representation of the People Act 1918, West Monmouthshire's area was divided between three constituencies: Abertillery, Bedwellty and Ebbw Vale.

== Members of Parliament ==
Election	Member	Party
1885	Marshall Warmington	Liberal
1895	Sir William Harcourt	Liberal
1904	Thomas Richards	Liberal
1910	Thomas Richards	Labour
1918	constituency abolished	

== Elections ==
=== Elections in the 1880s ===
General election 1885: West Monmouthshire
Party	Candidate	Votes	%	±%
Liberal	Marshall Warmington	6,730	83.4	
Conservative	Benjamin Francis Williams	1,341	16.6	
Majority		5,389	66.8	
Turnout		8,071	82.6	
Liberal win (new seat)				

General election 1886: West Monmouthshire
Party	Candidate	Votes	%	±%
Liberal	Marshall Warmington	Unopposed		
Liberal hold				

=== Elections in the 1890s ===
General election 1892: West Monmouthshire
Party	Candidate	Votes	%	±%
Liberal	Marshall Warmington	7,019	80.5	N/A
Conservative	William Herbert Meredyth	1,700	19.5	New
Majority		5,319	61.0	N/A
Turnout		8,719	77.5	N/A
Registered electors		11,251		
Liberal hold		Swing	N/A	

Harcourt

General election 1895: West Monmouthshire
Party	Candidate	Votes	%	±%
Liberal	William Vernon Harcourt	7,243	78.7	−1.8
Conservative	William Edwin Williams	1,956	21.3	+1.8
Majority		5,287	57.4	−3.6
Turnout		9,199	80.2	+2.7
Registered electors		11,475		
Liberal hold		Swing	-1.8	

=== Elections in the 1900s ===
General election 1900: West Monmouthshire
Party	Candidate	Votes	%	±%
Liberal	William Vernon Harcourt	5,976	71.3	−7.4
Conservative	Iltyd William Henry Gardner	2,401	28.7	+7.4
Majority		3,575	42.6	−14.8
Turnout		8,377	75.1	−5.1
Registered electors		11,150		
Liberal hold		Swing	-7.4	

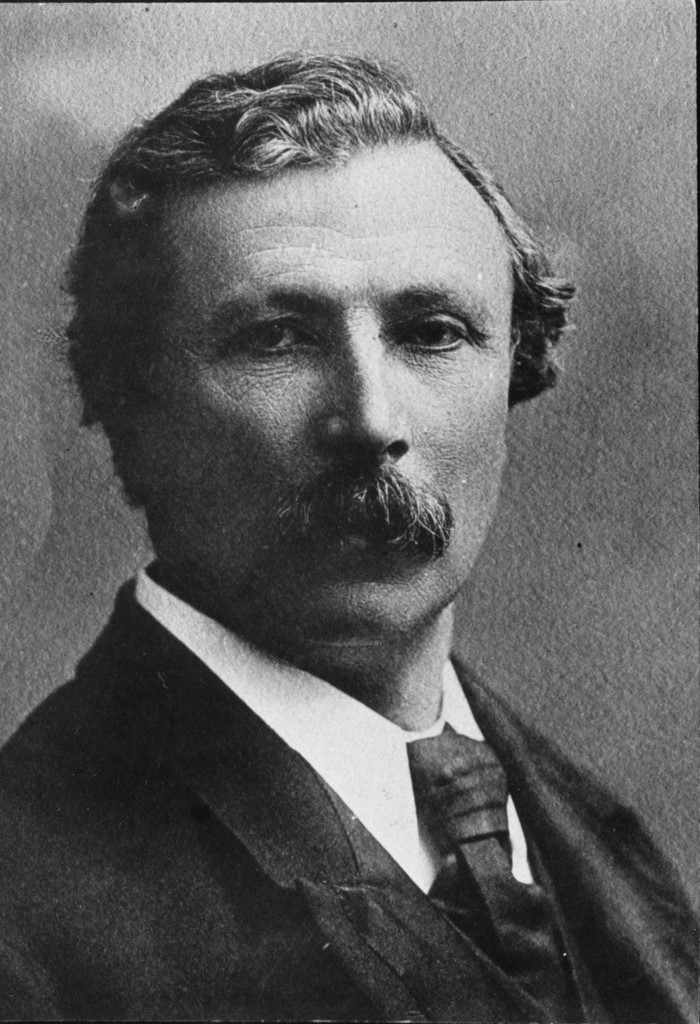
Cockburn

1904 West Monmouthshire by-election
Party	Candidate	Votes	%	±%
Lib-Lab	Thomas Richards	7,995	70.4	−0.9
Tariff Reform	John Cockburn	3,360	29.6	New
Majority		4,635	40.8	−1.8
Turnout		11,355	75.1	0.0
Registered electors		15,127		
Lib-Lab hold		Swing		

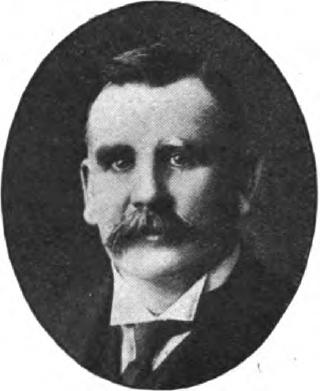
Thomas Richards

General election 1906: West Monmouthshire
Party	Candidate	Votes	%	±%
Lib-Lab	Thomas Richards	Unopposed		
Lib-Lab hold				

=== Elections in the 1910s ===
General election January 1910: West Monmouthshire
Party	Candidate	Votes	%	±%
Labour	Thomas Richards	13,295	81.4	N/A
Conservative	John Cameron	3,045	18.6	New
Majority		10,250	62.8	N/A
Turnout		16,340	80.1	N/A
Registered electors		20,399		
Labour gain from Lib-Lab		Swing	N/A	

General election December 1910: West Monmouthshire
Party	Candidate	Votes	%	±%
Labour	Thomas Richards	Unopposed		
Labour hold				

General Election 1914–15:

Another General Election was required to take place before the end of 1915. The political parties had been making preparations for an election to take place and by July 1914, the following candidates had been selected;

- Labour: Thomas Richards
- Unionist:
