= 1906 United Kingdom general election =

- 12 January – 8 February 1906

All 670 seats in the House of Commons 336 seats needed for a majority
- Registered: 7,264,608
- Turnout: 5,246,672; 83.2% (▲8.1 pp)
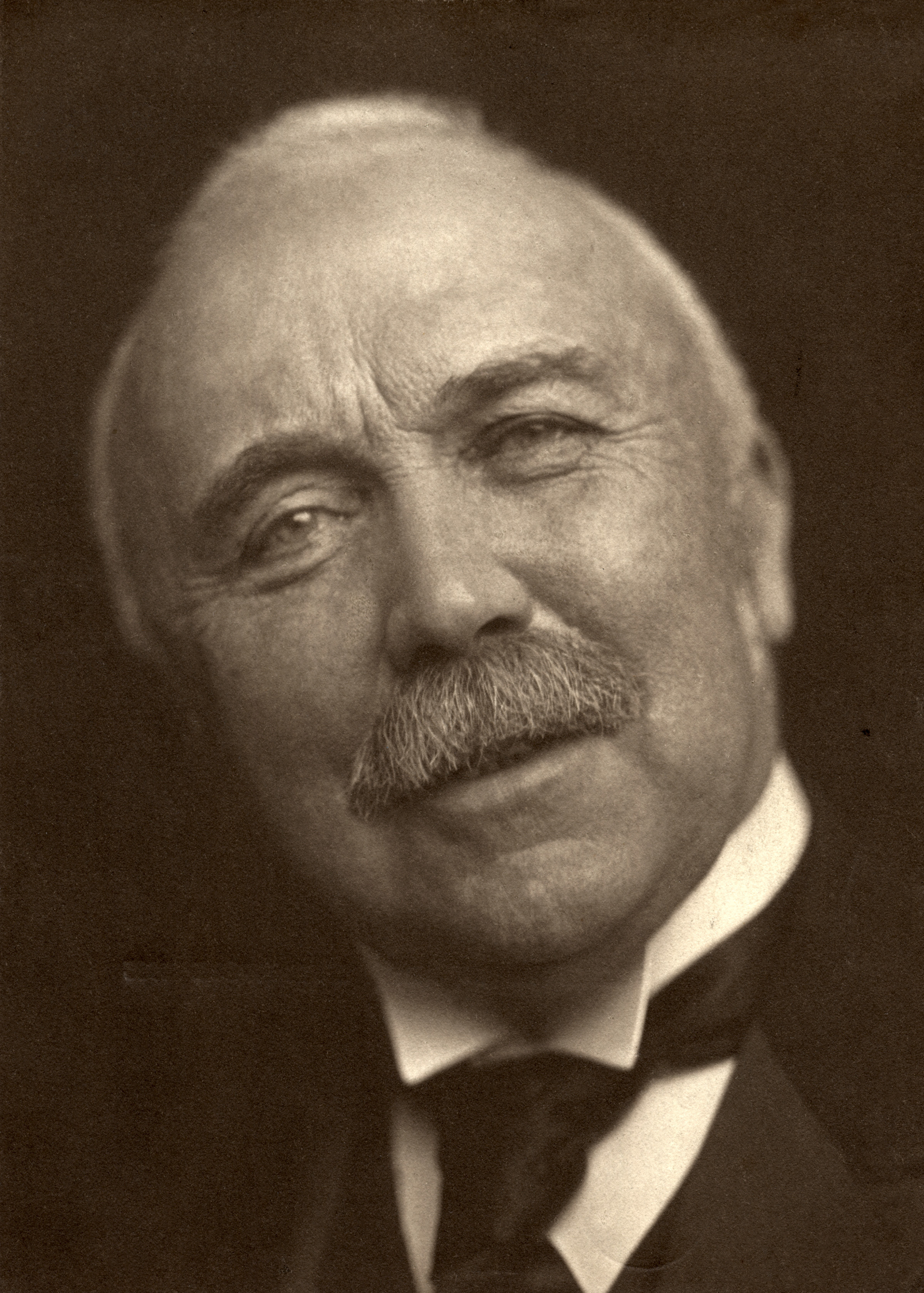

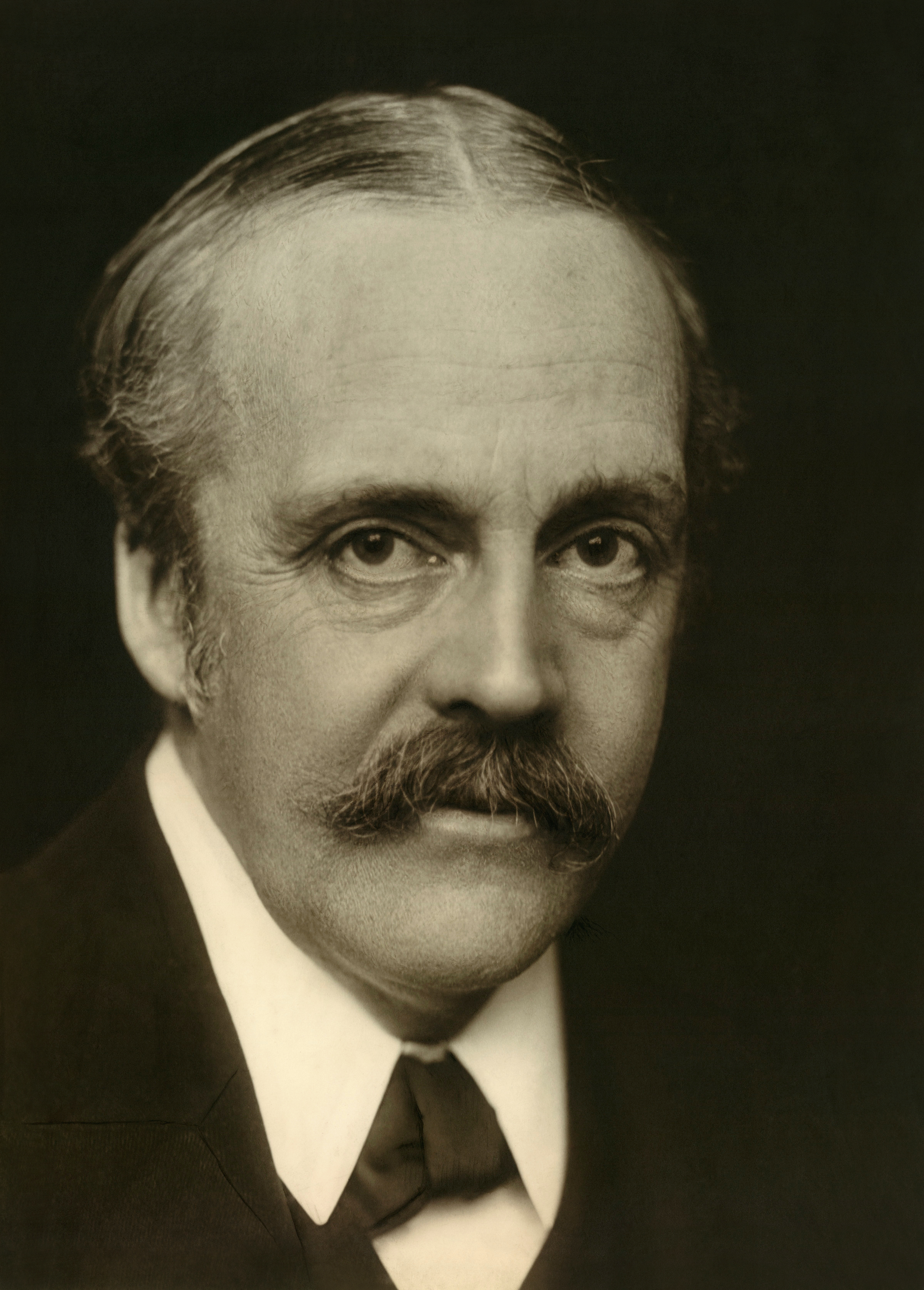

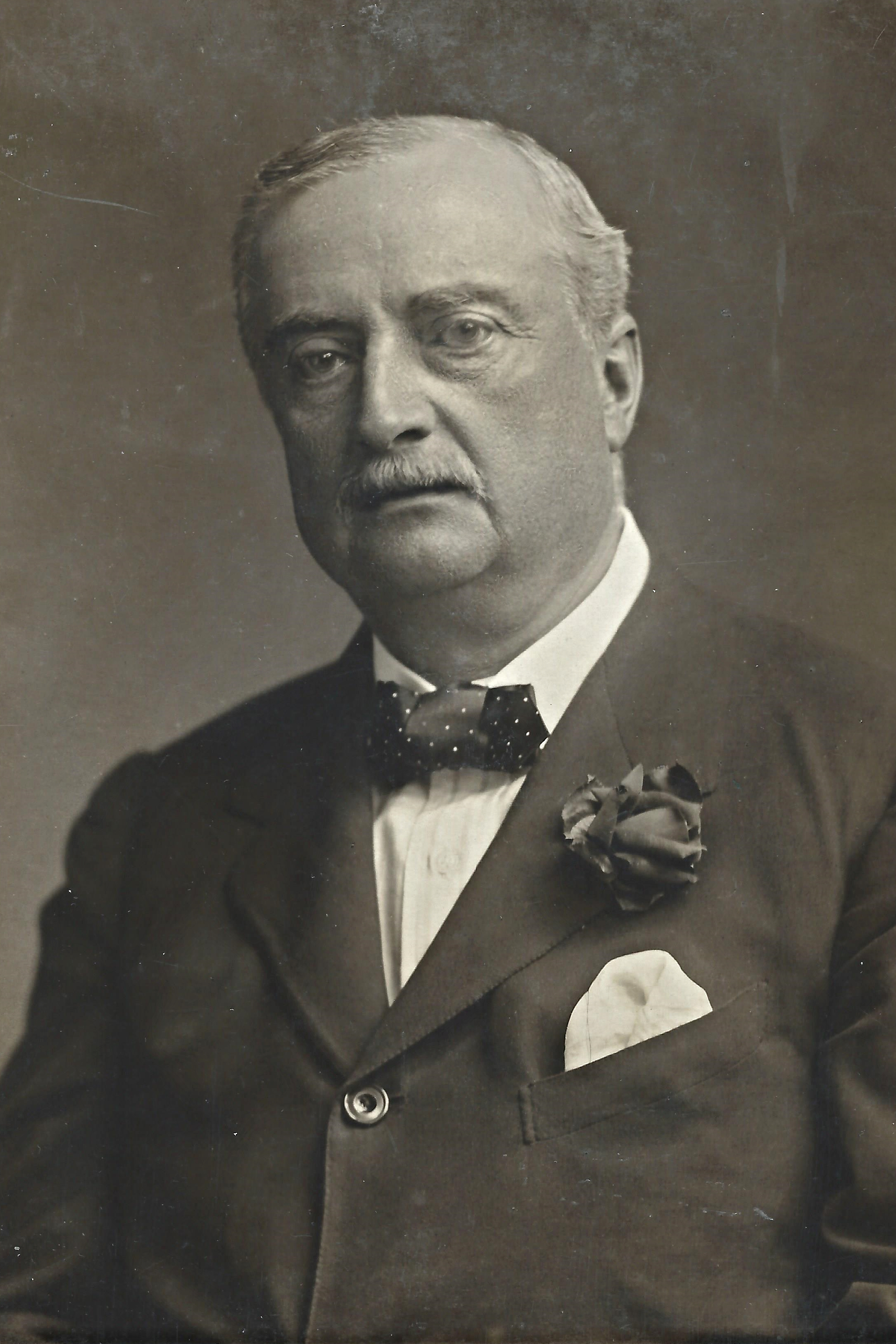

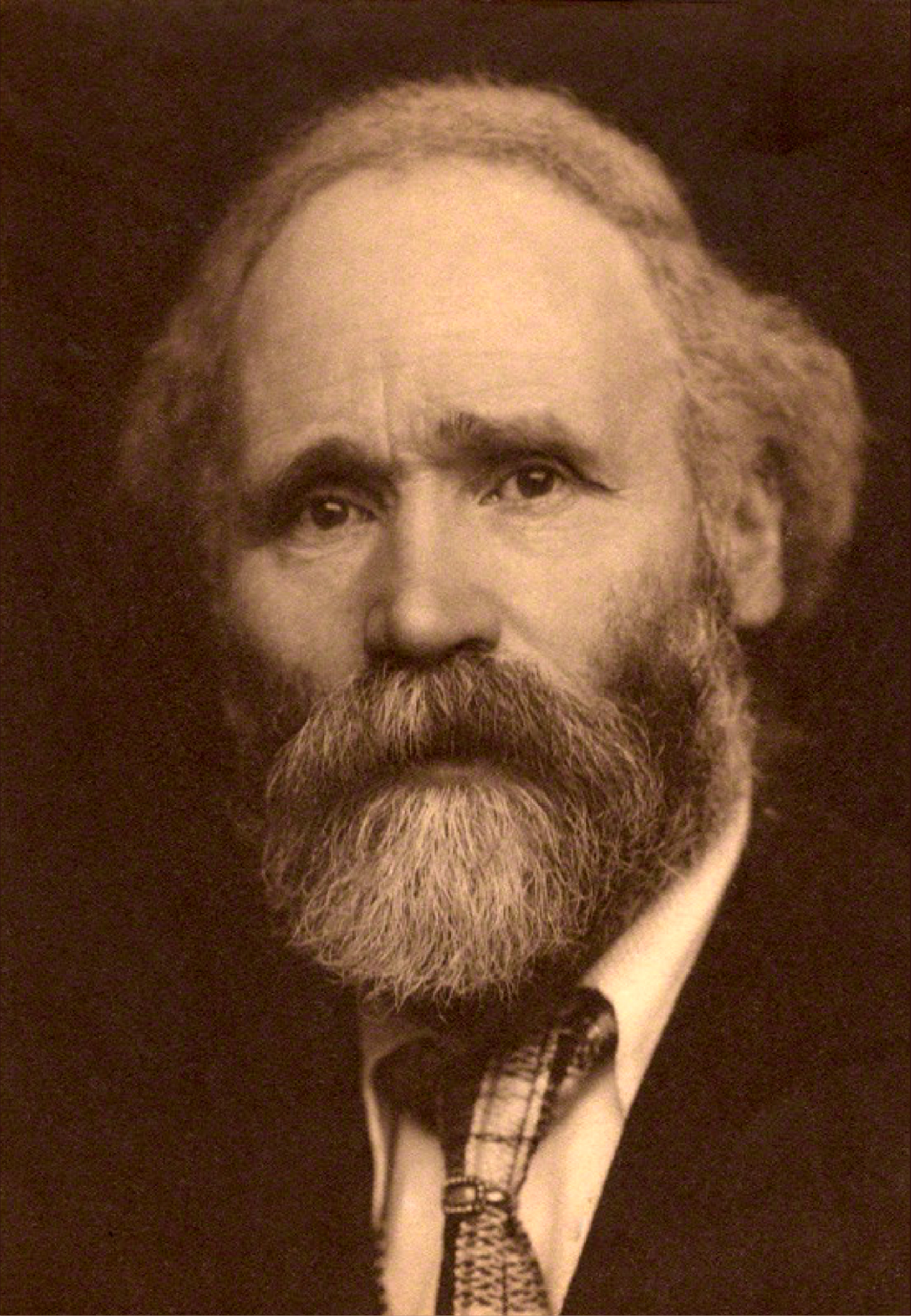

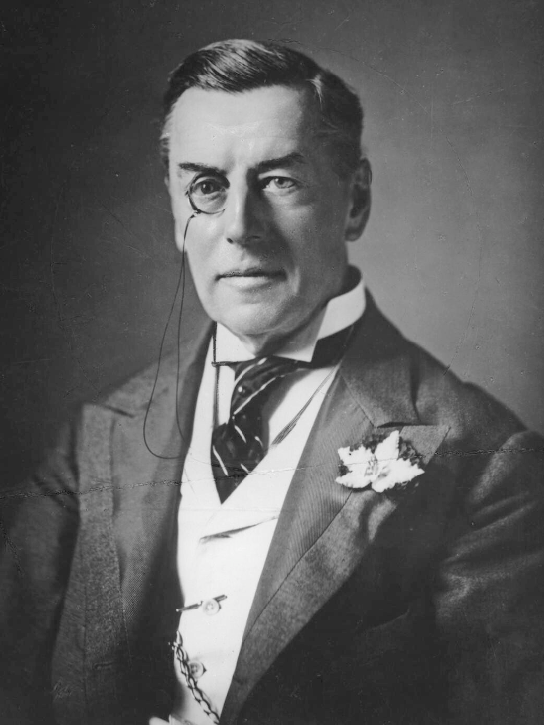
	First party	Second party	Third party
Leader	Henry Campbell-Bannerman	Arthur Balfour	John Redmond
Party	Liberal	Conservative	Irish Parliamentary
Alliance	Gladstone–MacDonald pact	Conservative-Liberal Unionist
Leader since	December 1898	11 June 1902	6 February 1900
Leader's seat	Stirling Burghs	Manchester East (defeated)	Waterford City
Last election	183 seats, 45.1%	335 seats, 41.8%	77 seats, 1.8%
Seats won	397	130 (Note: Figure includes Speaker of the House of Commons James Lowther in Penrith.)	82
Seat change	▲214	▼205	▲5
Popular vote	2,724,874	2,012,782	31,100
Percentage	48.9%	36.1%	0.6%
Swing	▲3.8 pp	▼5.7 pp	▼1.2 pp
	Fourth party	Fifth party
Leader	Keir Hardie	Joseph Chamberlain
Party	Labour Repr. Cmte.	Liberal Unionist
Alliance	Gladstone–MacDonald pact	Conservative-Liberal Unionist
Leader since	28 February 1900	1903
Leader's seat	Merthyr Tydfil	Birmingham West
Last election	2 seats, 1.3%	67 seats, 8.5%
Seats won	29	26
Seat change	▲27	▼41
Popular vote	321,663	410,161
Percentage	4.8%	7.3%
Swing	▲3.5 pp	▼1.2 pp
- Colours denote the winning party

- Composition of the House of Commons after the election
Prime Minister before election
Sir Henry Campbell-Bannerman
Liberal
Prime Minister after
election
Sir Henry Campbell-Bannerman
Liberal

The 1906 United Kingdom general election was held from 12 January to 8 February 1906. The Liberals under Henry Campbell-Bannerman won a landslide victory against a bewildered Conservative Party, in which its leader, Arthur Balfour, lost his seat; the party won the lowest number of seats it ever had in its history, a record unsurpassed until 2024. This particular landslide is now ranked alongside the 1924, 1931, 1945, 1983, 1997, 2001, and 2024 general elections as one of the largest landslide election victories.

The Labour Representation Committee was far more successful than at the 1900 general election and after the election would be renamed the Labour Party with 29 MPs and Keir Hardie as leader. The Irish Parliamentary Party, led by John Redmond, achieved its seats with a relatively low number of votes, as 73 candidates stood unopposed. This election was a landslide defeat for the Conservative Party and their Liberal Unionist allies, with the primary reason given by historians being the party's weakness after its split over the issue of free trade (Joseph Chamberlain had resigned from government in September 1903 in order to campaign for Tariff Reform, which would allow "preferential tariffs"). Many working-class people at the time saw this as a threat to the price of food, hence the debate was nicknamed "Big Loaf, Little Loaf". The Liberals' landslide victory of 124 seats over all other parties led to the passing of social legislation known as the Liberal reforms.

This was the last general election in which the Liberals won an absolute majority in the House of Commons, the last general election in which neither Labour nor the Conservatives won the popular vote, and the only election held between 1886 and 1945 in which the Conservatives did not win the popular vote. It was also the last peacetime election held more than five years after the previous one prior to passage of the Parliament Act 1911, which limited the duration of Parliaments in peacetime to five years. In this election the Conservatives were reduced to their lowest seat count in the party's history, a record not broken until 2024, 118 years later.

== Electoral system ==
Most of the MPs were elected through first-past-the-post voting in single-member districts. Conversely, 54 MPs were elected in two-seat districts by the use of plurality block voting, where each voter could cast up to two votes.

== Candidates ==
Below is a table summarising the candidates of the 1906 general election.

Affiliation	Candidates
Liberal Party	528 (Note: Includes 27 Liberal-Labour candidates.)
Conservative Party	435
Liberal Unionist Party	100
Irish Parliamentary Party	83
Labour Representation Committee	50
Irish Unionist Party	22
Russellite Unionist	9
Social Democratic Federation	8
Independent Conservative	6
Independent Labour	6
Scottish Workers'	5
Free Trader	5 (Note: The candidates that stood were Arthur Elliot in Durham, Sir Charles Seely in Lincoln, Leader John Eldon Gorst in Cambridge University, John Strachey in Edinburgh and St Andrews Universities and W. R. Smith in Glasgow and Aberdeen Universities.)
Independent Nationalist	3
Independent Unionist	1 (Note: Candidate Thomas Sloan stood in Belfast South.)
Independent Liberal-Labour	1 (Note: Candidate John Williams stood in Gower.)
Music Copyright Association	1 (Note: Candidate A. S. Gibson stood in Mid Lanarkshire.)
Fiscal Reform	1 (Note: Candidate Abraham Rosenthal stood in Glasgow Tradeston.)
Healyite Nationalist	1 (Note: Candidate Tim Healy stood in North Louth.)
Independent Liberal	1 (Note: Candidate Murray Spencer Richardson stood in Sevenoaks.)
Independent Liberal Unionist	1 (Note: Candidate Alexander Carlisle stood in Belfast West.)
Independent Protestant	1 (Note: Candidate John Alfred Kensit stood in Birkenhead.)
Lancashire and Cheshire Women's	1 (Note: Candidate Thorley Smith stood in Wigan.)
London Liberal and Radical	1 (Note: Candidate Dadabhai Naoroji stood in Lambeth North.)
Naval	1 (Note: Candidate Fred T. Jane stood in Portsmouth.)
Thanet Conservative League	1 (Note: Candidate Frederick E McCormick Goodhart stood in Isle of Thanet.)
Free Church and Progressive	1 (Note: Candidate William Riley stood in Hackney South.)
Total	1,273

== Background ==
A coalition between the Conservative and Liberal Unionist parties had governed the United Kingdom since the 1895 general election. Arthur Balfour had served as Prime Minister from 1902 until 5 December 1905, when he chose to resign over growing unpopularity. Instead of calling a general election, Balfour had hoped that under a Liberal government, splits would re-emerge; which would therefore help the Conservative Party achieve victory at the next general election.

The incoming Liberal government chose to capitalise on the Conservative government's unpopularity and called an immediate general election one month later on 12 January 1906, which resulted in a crushing defeat for the Conservatives.

=== Conservative unpopularity ===
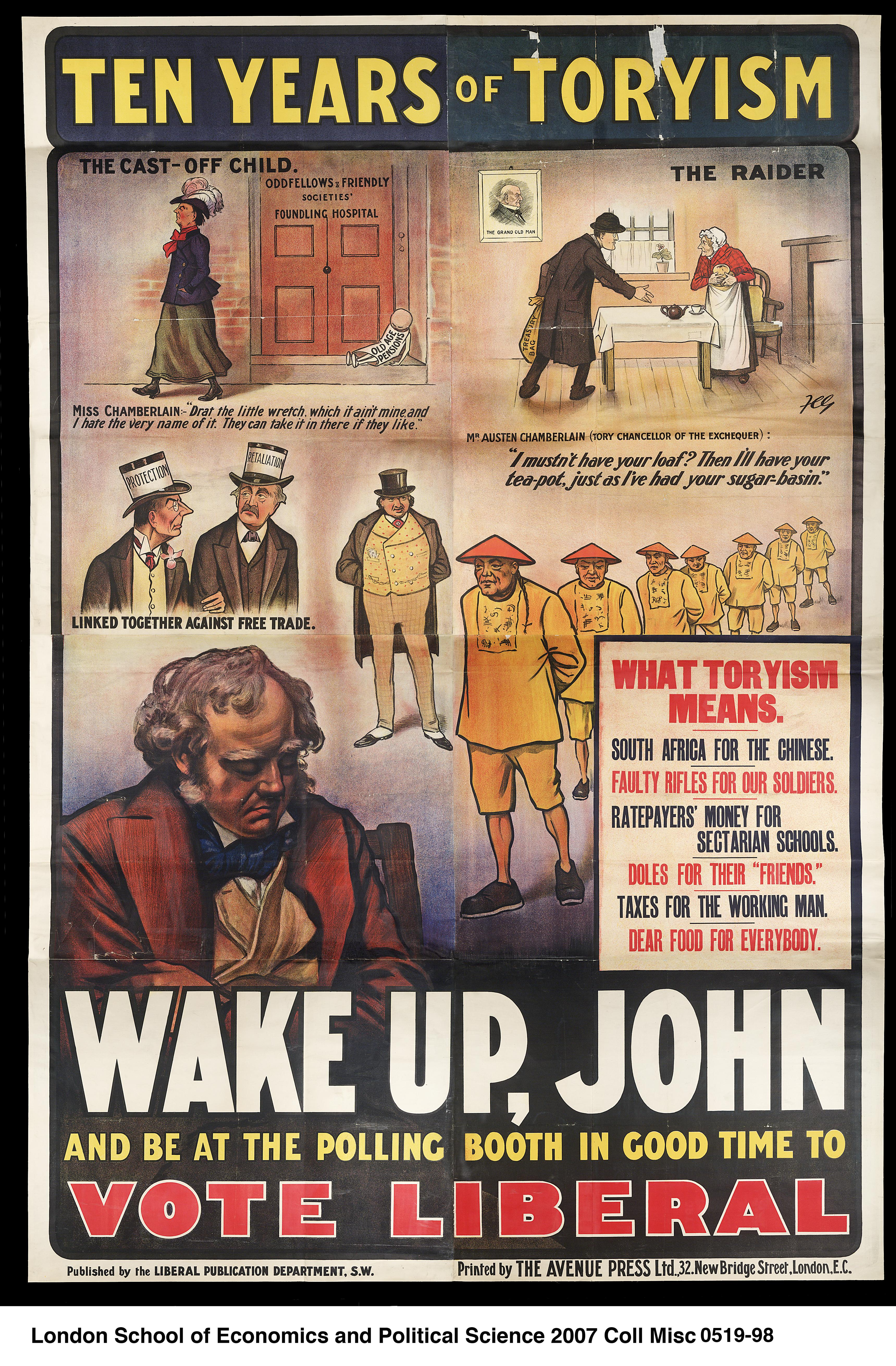
Example of a Liberal poster during the election

The Unionist government had become deeply divided over the issue of free trade, which soon became an electoral liability. This culminated in Joseph Chamberlain's resignation from the government in May 1903 to campaign for tariff reform in order to protect British industry from foreign competition. This division was in contrast to the Liberal Party's belief in free trade, which it argued would help keep costs of living down.

The issue of free trade became the feature of the Liberal campaign, under the slogan 'big loaf' under a Liberal government, 'little loaf' under a Conservative government. It also commissioned a variety of posters warning the electorate over rises in food prices under protectionist policies, including one which mentioned that "Balfour and Chamberlain are linked together against free trade ... Don't be deceived by Tory tricks".

The Boer War had also contributed to the unpopularity of the Conservative and Unionist government. The war had lasted over two and half years, much longer than had originally been expected, while details were revealed of the existence of concentration camps where over 20,000 men, women and children were reported to have died because of poor sanitation.

The war had also unearthed the poor social state of the country in the early 1900s. This was after more than 40% of military recruits for the Boer War were declared unfit for military service; in Manchester, 8,000 of the 11,000 men who had been recruited had to be turned away for being in poor physical condition. This was after the 1902 Rowntree study of poverty in York showed that almost one-third of the population lived below the 'poverty line', which helped to increase the calls for social reforms, something which had been neglected by the Conservative and Unionist government.

The Conservative and Unionist Prime Minister, Arthur Balfour, had been blamed over the issue of 'Chinese Slavery', i.e. the use of Chinese-indentured labour in South Africa (see Chinese South Africans). This became controversial among the Conservative Party's middle-class supporters, who saw it as unethical. The working-class also objected to the practice, as White emigration to South Africa could have created jobs for the unemployed in Britain.

Nonconformists were angered when Conservatives pushed through the Education Act 1902, which integrated voluntary schools into the state system and provided for their support from the local rate. The local school boards were abolished and replaced by local education authorities based on county or county borough councils. Worst of all, the Anglican schools, which were on the edge of bankruptcy would thus receive funding from local rates that everyone had to pay. One tactic was to refuse to pay local taxes. The school system played a major role in the Liberal victory in 1906, as Dissenter (nonconformist) Conservatives punished their old party and voted Liberal. However, the Liberals were conscious of the call to fair treatment their victory had in the counties and neither repealed or modified the 1902 law. Another issue which lost the Conservatives nonconformist votes was the Licensing Act 1904. Although the legislation aimed to reduce the number of public houses, it proposed to compensate brewers for the cancellation of their licence, through a fund the brewers themselves would have to pay into leading many who adhered to temperance to denounce it as a "brewers' bill", and brewers generally being dissatisfied.

== Outcome ==
=== Liberal Party ===
The Liberal Party led by Henry Campbell-Bannerman saw a massive majority nationally. In England, with the party winning 306 seats, an increase of 185 seats. The party won 49.0% of the vote in England, a minor increase by 3.4%. The party only lost 2 seats to Conservatives, and 2 seat to the Labour Representation Committee, with the otherwise party gaining 189 seats from the Conservatives and Liberal Unionists.

It also gained Osgoldcross. Independent Liberal MP Sir John Austin had stood down at this election, leaving Parliament, with the Liberals re-taking the seat. Notably, Winston Churchill had defected from the Conservative Party after having won his seat as such in Oldham. However, Churchill ran instead in Manchester North West, winning as a Liberal candidate; however, he would lose the seat at the 1908 Manchester North West by-election caused by him being made the president of the Board of Trade. Churchill would, however, re-enter Parliament in Scotland at the 1908 Dundee by-election, and remain there for the next election.

In Scotland the opposition Liberals under Henry Campbell-Bannerman won a crushing victory, winning 56.4% of vote and 58 out of Scotland's 72 seats. The Liberals gained 27 seats from the Conservatives and Liberal Unionists. However, it suffered 3 losses; 2 seats to the Conservative Party, and one to the Labour Party. The figure of 56.4% has not been surpassed by any single party in any election since, although the coalition of parties forming the National Government would secure 64.0% at the 1931 election.

In Wales, it saw a minor 1.7% increase in vote share, but with a net gain of 6 seats due to the collapse in support for the Conservative Party. The Liberal Party retained the seats of Anglesey, Arfon, Eifion, East Denbighshire, Flint Boroughs, Flintshire, Merioneth, Montgomeryshire, Breconshire, Cardiganshire, Carmarthen Boroughs, East Carmarthenshire, West Carmarthenshire, West Denbighshire, Pembrokeshire, Radnorshire, Cardiff, Swansea Town, Caernarfon, East Glamorganshire, Rhondda, Mid Glamorganshire, Swansea District, North Monmouthshire and West Monmouthshire. The party also held one of the two seats in the two-member constituency of Merthyr Tydfil. It gained all remaining seats from the Conservative Party, however lost one to an independent.

Liberal candidate Ivor Herbert entered Parliament in South Monmouthshire, with the party winning the seat from the Conservatives. David Davies in Montgomeryshire, and thereby replacing a retiring Liberal MP, re-entering Parliament after having previously fought the 1886 general election in Cardiganshire as a Liberal Unionist after having held it as a Liberal in 1885 general election.

Within the Liberal Party count were several Liberal-Labour faction MPs who won or held seats in England. These were Dartford, Battersea, Finsbury Central, Haggerston, Hanley, Stoke-upon-Trent, Nuneaton, Chesterfield, Nottingham South, North Northamptonshire, Burnley, Salford North, Birkenhead, Mid Durham, Gateshead, Morpeth, Wansbeck, Middlesbrough, Hallamshire and Normanton. The faction also one of the two seats in each of Derby and Leicester. 22 were held by Liberal-Labour MPs in England. Additionally, in Wales, William Abraham in Rhondda had been such a winning candidate within the party since 1885 and had remained in support of the Liberals since at least the 1886 election. Further gains for these dual candidates came from gains from the Conservative Party. These were Clement Edwards in Denbigh Boroughs, William Brace in South Glamorganshire. Additionally, Thomas Richards in West Monmouthshire won the seat, replacing the Liberal MP at the 1904 West Monmouthshire by-election without facing any Liberal opposition. As such, 26 Liberal-Labour MP were returned at this election.

It retained it one seat in Ireland of North Tyrone.

=== Conservative Party ===
It was the worst seat result of the Conservative Party since its formation at the time, with the party beating the Tory Party's result in the 1832 general election. At a total of 130 seats, Conservatives would only face a defeat this large again in the 2024 general election.

In England, the Conservatives saw a drop in vote share of around 8.0% to 37.8%, and a significant decrease in seats across England, with a wider 8.1% decrease vote share to 44.3% between itself and its allies, the Liberal Unionist Party. The Conservatives did retain 3 of its seats in the English university constituencies. It lost 187 seat in England to both the Liberals and Labour Representation Committee, off-set by a few gains. It gained the seats of Hastings, Maidstone which it had lost in the previous election, and took Wakefield technically from the Liberal Unionists. Overall, the party only took 104 county and borough constituency seats, and held its 3 university constituency seats.

Another major upset was in Manchester East, where Leader of the Conservative Party and incumbent Prime Minister Arthur Balfour lost his seat, with Liberal candidate Thomas Gardner Horridge winning the seat. Balfour would, however, would remain as leader and re-enter Parliament in City of London at the February 1906 City of London by-election.

In Scotland, the party held the university constituency seats of Edinburgh and St Andrews Universities and Glasgow and Aberdeen Universities. It also held the county and borough seats of Wick Burghs, Ayr Burghs and Wigtownshire. Notably, in Ayrshire Burghs, George Younger was elected, after first contesting the seat at the 1904 Ayr Burghs by-election after the death of the Conservative incumbent. His win in the seat was a retain overall in the election, despite the Liberals winning the by-election. Younger would go on to be the chairman of the Unionist Party upon its formation in 1912 following the merging of the Conservative and Liberal Unionist parties.

George Younger

Despite is loss in vote share overall, it gained Glasgow Govan and North West Lanarkshire. In both seats, the Conservatives stood against Liberal candidates, but also respective labour movement candidates. Although the Conservatives lost vote share in each seat, the labour candidates took more vote share in stead from the Liberals.

However, it lost Elginshire and Nairnshire, Stirlingshire, Dunbartonshire, Greenock, East Renfrewshire, West Renfrewshire, Kilmarnock Burghs, Argyllshire, Buteshire, Glasgow Bridgeton, Glasgow Central, Glasgow College, South Lanarkshire, Kirkcudbright Stewartry, and Roxburghshire to the Liberal Party. It also lost Glasgow Blackfriars and Hutchesontown to the Labour Party. George Barnes unseated incumbent sitting MP, Bonar Law, who later would go on to become Prime Minister. Law would leave Parliament briefly at this election, with his re-entry to Parliament occurring in England at the 1906 Dulwich by-election. Law would return to a Scottish constituency in Glasgow Central in the 1918 general election. Overall, with 2 gains but 16 losses, the party was reduced from 21 seats to just 7 in Scotland.

In Wales. The party returned no seats, receiving it worst result in it s history. The Conservatives lost its remaining seats of Denbigh Boroughs, South Glamorganshire, Monmouth Boroughs, South Monmouthshire, Montgomery and Pembroke and Haverfordwest to the Liberal Party. It was the first election since the formation of the Conservative Party in which it won no seats in Wales. This would only occur again in the 1997, 2001 and 2024 general elections.

In Ireland, the Irish Unionist Party, which stood under the Whip of the Conservatives, retained their northern seats of Belfast East, Belfast North, East Antrim, Mid Antrim, South Antrim, Londonderry City, North Londonderry, Mid Armagh, North Armagh, East Down, North Down, West Down and North Fermanagh. It also retained its seats in South Dublin, as well as both its seats in Dublin University unopposed.

=== Liberal Unionist Party ===
The Liberal Unionist Party, led by Joseph Chamberlain, which saw splits over free trade policy with the Conservative Party and internally, saw only a relatively small 0.1% decrease in vote to 6.5% of the vote, but with a drop of 26 seats. The Liberal Unionists stood more candidates in England than in the last election, and saw a steady vote share, particularly due to more of its candidates facing opponents in its seats rather than running unopposed. The party retained Totnes, Aylesbury, Ludlow, Burton, Handsworth, East Worcestershire, West Derbyshire, Great Grimsby, Darlington, Durham and South East Durham. The party may have retained the seat of North Lonsdale. Seminal collations classed George Haddock as a winning Conservative, replacing the retiring Liberal Unionist Lord Richard Cavendish; however, subsequent research on Haddock's candidature placed him instead as a winning Liberal Unionist, with the party thereby retaining the seat.

It also retained its university constituency seats in London University and Oxford University. It also held its metropolitan Birmingham seats of Birmingham Bordesley, Birmingham Central, Birmingham North, Birmingham South and Birmingham West. Its only gain in the election was in Croydon, wherein Hugh Oakeley Arnold-Forster won the seat, with Conservative Charles Ritchie not standing, retiring from Parliament. The gain was technically a gain from the Conservatives, however the Conservatives did not stand against the party as party its national alliance.

However, in its heavy losses, it lost Bodmin, St Ives, Truro, Tavistock, East Somerset, Bristol North, St Pancras South, Biggleswade, Sudbury, Wellington (Shropshire), Newcastle-under-Lyme, West Staffordshire, Ross, Droitwich, North Worcestershire, Warwick and Leamington, Lincoln, Peterborough, Manchester South, Liverpool Exchange, Tyneside, Bradford Central, Shipley to the Liberal party. It also lost it one seat in each of Bath, Southampton and Halifax to the Liberals. Between it and the Conservative Party, the Conservatives won Wakefield from the Liberal Unionists. Liberal Unionist MP, William Wentworth-Fitzwilliam, took his peerage to the House of Lords, with Conservative Edward Brotherton winning the seat in the 1902 Wakefield by-election. Nevertheless, Brotherton's retain was a gain from the Liberal Unionist, running unopposed by the party.

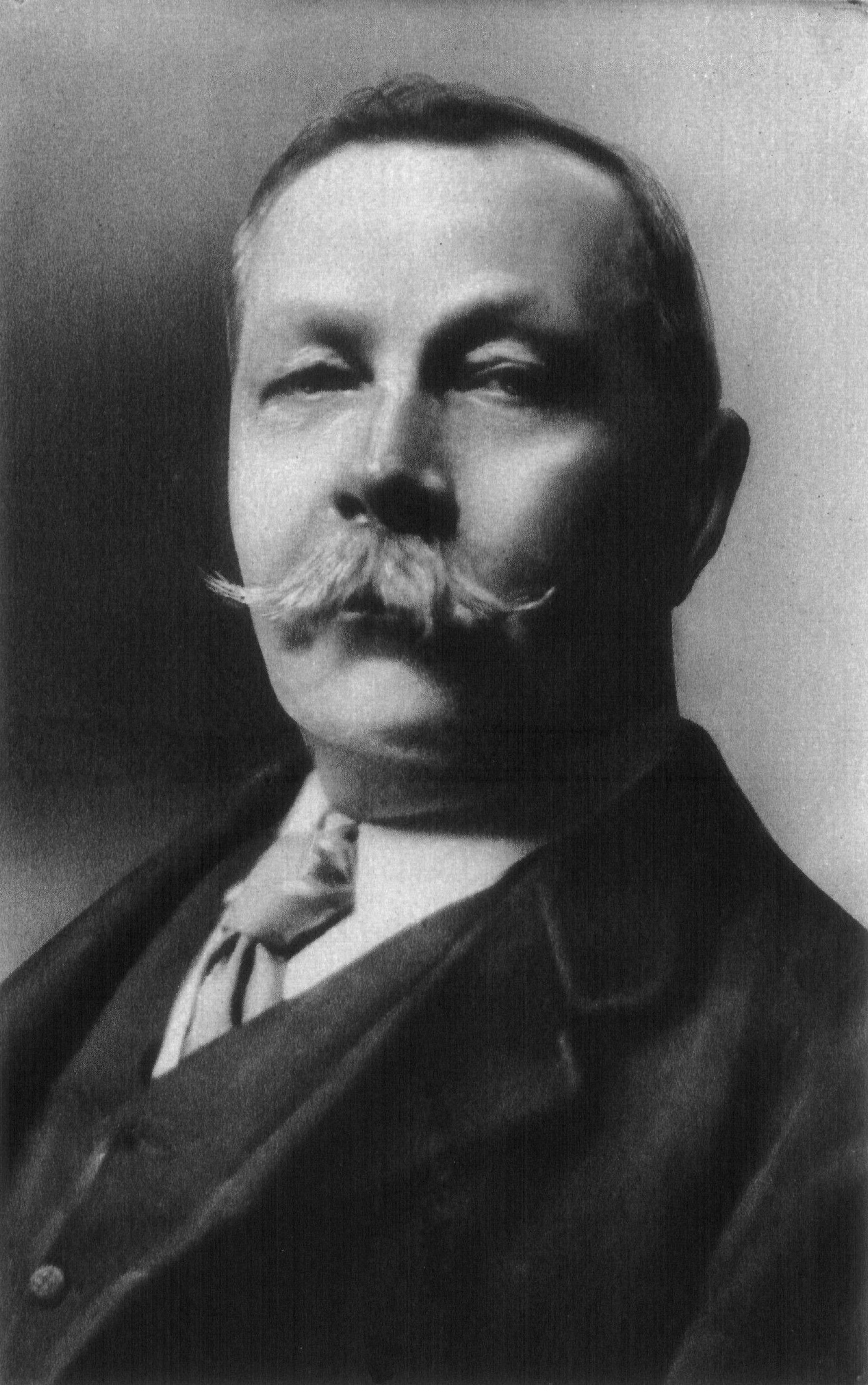
Conan Doyle

In Scotland, it retained the seats of St Andrews Burghs, North Ayrshire, Glasgow Camlachie, Glasgow Tradeston, Edinburgh West. Of note, in the seat of Hawick Burghs, writer Arthur Conan Doyle once again unsuccessfully stood as a Liberal Unionist candidate, after having been defeated in 1900 in Edinburgh Central.

However, much like the Conservative party, the Liberal Unionists suffered several losses. It lost Orkney and Shetland, Sutherland, Inverness Burghs, East Aberdeenshire, West Perthshire, Falkirk Burghs, South Ayrshire, Glasgow St Rollox, Partick, Edinburgh South, Dumfriesshire and Peebles and Selkirk.

In Wales, the Liberal Unionist Party, however, saw a swing in favour of it, owing very much to standing three candidates in this election as opposed to one in 1900. However, none of such candidates were successful. Vere Ponsonby stood in Carmarthen, only taking around a third of the vote, as had C. Richardson in Cardiganshire. James Fortescue Flannery in Cardiff was the most successful of the three, taking 40.0% of the vote, after having previously held Shipley from the 1895 until this election, however did not take the seat. The Liberal Unionists therefore did not gain representation again in Wales. Of note, there is a general conflict as to the candidature of Ponsonby and Flannery as to whether they stood as Conservatives or Liberal Unionists, however, later sources suggest in favour of each standing as Liberal Unionists at this election, particularly as Flannery had previous held a seat under that label.

In Ireland, the party was reduced to just holding South Londonderry.

=== Labour Representation Committee ===
Leading figures in the new Labour Party

The Labour Representation Committee led by Keir Hardie saw a surge in representation in England. The party took a total of 26 seats overall. The committee did see a loss, with the group's first MP Richard Bell, in one of the two seats in Derby. Bell defected, standing and winning instead a as Liberal-Labour candidate in support of the Liberal Party.

The group otherwise won Chatham, Deptford, Woolwich, West Ham South, Wolverhampton West, Barrow and Furness, Manchester Gorton, Ince, Manchester North East, Manchester South West, Newton, St Helens, Westhoughton, Bradford West, Leeds East from the Conservatives. It won Clitheroe and Barnard Castle from the Liberal Party. Future Leader of the Labour Party Arthur Henderson entered Parliament in Barnard Castle. It also took one of the two seats in Norwich, Leicester, Blackburn, Bolton, Preston, Stockport, Sunderland, Newcastle-upon-Tyne from the Conservatives. It also won one of the two seats in Halifax from the Liberal Unionists.

In Wales, the group once again stood 2 candidates. These were leader Keir Hardie in Merthyr Tydfil and James Whinstone in Monmouth Boroughs. Hardie was successful in retaining one of the two seats in Merthyr Tydfil. However, Whinstone was unsuccessful against the Liberal and Conservative candidates in the contest, achieving only just under 17.0% of the vote.

The party standing only 4 candidates but picking up 2 Scottish seats. These were future Leader of the Labour Party George Barnes in Glasgow Blackfriars and Hutchesontown and Alexander Wilkie in one of the two seats in Dundee, with a 2.3% vote share when adjusted for the multi-member seat calculous. Alongside the 2 seats in Scotland, the Labour Representation Committee took a total of 29 seats across the UK.

The Labour Representation Committee would form the Labour Party following the election, and standing the following elections as such.

=== Others ===
There were several other successful candidates across the country. In Wales, Independent Liberal-Labour candidate John Williams won the seat of Gower, standing against a Liberal candidate and therefore being classed as an independent rather than being any official Liberal. However, he would take the Liberal Whip following the election. This was the only technical loss for the Liberal Party in Wales in this election, despite William joining the party later. However, Williams, much like most of the sitting Liberal-Labour MPs would join the Labour Party before the January 1910 election, and win as such in that election.

In England, in the seat of Chester-le-Street, John Wilkinson Taylor was elected as an Independent Labour MP. Taylor's candidature had for technical reasons not been endorsed by the Labour Representation Committee but he joined the Parliamentary Labour Party upon election.

In Ireland, Independent Unionist Thomas Sloan won the seat of Belfast South, after having retained it from the 1902 Belfast South by-election from the Irish Unionist Party. Additionally, 9 Russellite Unionist candidates stood, having broken away from the Irish Unionists. 2 won seats, being Robert Glendinning in North Antrim and the groups leader, Thomas Russell, in South Tyrone. These two MPs would join the Liberal Party following the election, however.

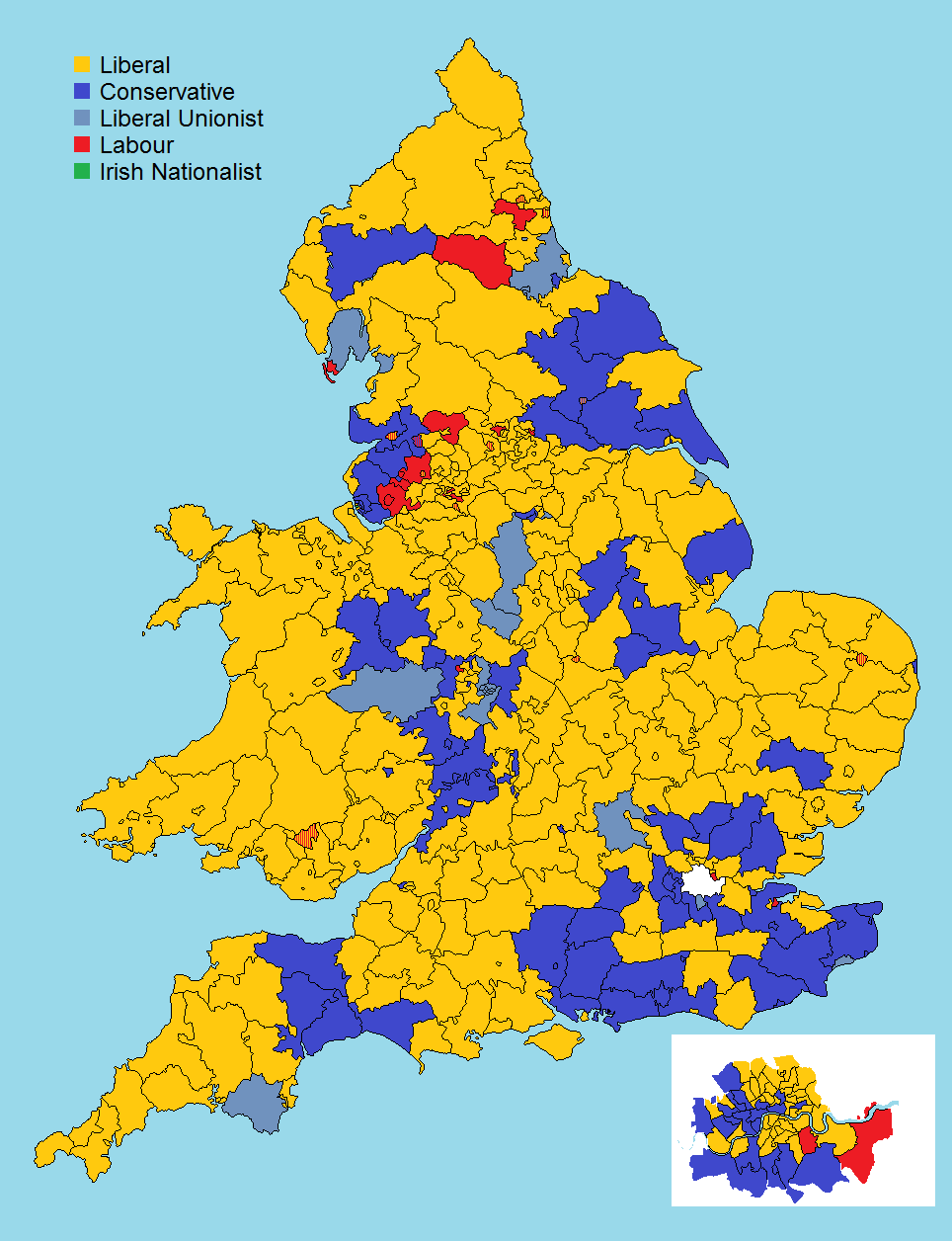
England and Wales seat winners

Results of London (and Croydon) and the seven W. and N. divisions, seats, of administrative Middlesex

== Results ==
The following tables are based on the collations of seats and votes collected by F. W. S. Craig for the results in Great Britain, and seats and votes collected by Brian Mercer Walker for Ireland. The distinctions made between the Conservatives, Irish Unionists and Liberal Unionists in alterations to these works are set out according to Wesley Ferris.

=== Summary of seats returned ===
Party	Leader	MPs		Aggregate votes	
Party	Leader		Of total		Of total (Note: Adjusted for multi-member constituencies.)
Liberal Party	Henry Campbell-Bannerman	397 (Note: Includes 26 Liberal-Labour MPs.)	59.3%	2,724,874	48.9%
Conservative-Liberal Unionist	Arthur Balfour	156	23.3%	2,422,943	43.4%
Conservative Party	Arthur Balfour	114	17.0%	1,959,344	35.2%
Liberal Unionist Party	Joseph Chamberlain	26	3.9%	410,161	7.3%
Irish Unionist Party (Note: Stood under the Conservative Party Whip; all figures are attributed to the Conservative Party nationally.)	Walter Long	16	2.4%	53,438	0.9%
Irish Parliamentary Party	John Redmond	82 (Note: Includes T. P. O'Connor in Liverpool Scotland.)	12.2%	31,100	0.6%
Labour Representation Committee	Keir Hardie	29	4.3%	321,663	4.8%
Russellite Unionist	Thomas Russell	2	0.3%	26,183	0.5%
Independent Labour	—N/a	1	0.1%	16,681	0.3%
Independent Liberal-Labour	—N/a	1	0.1%	4,841	0.1%
Independent Unionist	—N/a	1	0.1%	4,450	0.1%
Healyite Nationalist	Tim Healy	1	0.1%	0	0.0%

=== Full results ===

UK General Election 1906
		Candidates						Votes		
Party	Leader	Stood	Elected	Gained	Unseated	Net	% of total	%	No.	Net %
Liberal	Henry Campbell-Bannerman	528	397	223	9	+214	59.3	48.9	2,565,644	+3.9
Conservative and Liberal Unionist	Arthur Balfour	557	156	5	251	−246	23.3	43.4	2,278,076	−6.8
Labour Repr. Cmte.	Keir Hardie	50	29	28	1	+27	4.3	4.8	254,202	+3.6
Irish Parliamentary	John Redmond	84	82	6	1	+5	12.2	0.6	33,231	−1.2
Russellite Unionist	Thomas Russell	9	2	2	0	+2	0.3	0.5	26,183	
Independent Labour	N/A	7	1	1	0	+1	0.2	0.4	18,886	
Social Democratic Federation	H. M. Hyndman	8	0	0	0	0		0.4	18,446	
Ind. Conservative	N/A	9	1	1	0	+1	0.2	0.3	15,972	
Scottish Workers	George Carson	5	0	0	0	0		0.3	14,877	+0.2
Free Trader	John Eldon Gorst	5	0	0	0	0		0.2	8,974	
Independent Liberal-Labour	N/A	1	1	1	0	+1	0.2	0.1	4,841	
Independent	N/A	3	0	0	0	0		0.1	3,806	
Ind. Nationalist	N/A	3	1	0	0	0	0.2	0.0	1,800	
Independent Liberal	N/A	3	0	0	1	−1		0.0	1,581	
Ind. Liberal Unionist	N/A	1	0	0	0	0		0.0	153	

=== Popular vote ===
Popular vote
Liberal	48.9%
Conservative	36.1%
Liberal Unionist	7.3%
Labour R. C.	4.8%
Irish Parliamentary	0.7%
Russellite Unionist	0.5%
Others	1.7%

Popular vote (alliances)
Liberal	48.9%
Con-LU	43.4%
Labour R. C.	4.8%
Irish Parliamentary	0.7%
Russellite Unionist	0.5%
Others	1.7%

=== Parliament seats ===
Parliamentary seats
Liberal	59.3%
Conservative	19.4%
Irish Parliamentary	12.2%
Labour R. C.	4.3%
Liberal Unionist	3.9%
Russellite Unionist	0.3%
Others	0.6%

Popular vote (alliances)
Liberal	59.3%
Con-LU	23.3%
Irish Parliamentary	12.2%
Labour R. C.	4.3%
Russellite Unionist	0.3%
Others	0.6%

== Analysis ==
According to historian Lawrence Goldman:

The election of 1906 led eventually to old-age pensions, the Trade Boards Act of 1909 which applied minimum wages to the 'sweated trades', the redistributive 1909 'people's budget', the introduction of labour exchanges, the National Insurance Act of 1911, and the Parliament Act of that year which removed the House of Lords' veto on legislation from the Commons ... Though the eventual achievements of the parliament elected in 1906 were remarkable, the election was something of a fluke; the scale of the Liberal victory was in direct proportion to the scale of preceding Tory blunders but it exaggerated the degree of dependable Liberal support in the country. The subsequent elections in January and December 1910, during the crisis over the people's budget, saw the number of Liberal MPs reduced to 275 and 272 respectively, while Conservative support recovered and the party, together with their Liberal Unionist allies, took 273 and then 272 seats.

=== Notable results ===
The landslide Liberal victory led to many Conservative and Unionist MPs losing what had previously been regarded as safe seats. This resulted in prominent Conservative ministers being unseated including former Prime Minister Arthur Balfour. Only three of the Conservative cabinet which had served until December 1905 (one month before the election) held onto their seats, the outgoing: Home Secretary Aretas Akers-Douglas, Chancellor Austen Chamberlain (Liberal Unionist), Secretary of State for War H.O. Arnold-Forster who changed to that allied party before the election.

==== Manchester East ====
Arthur Balfour, who entered the general election as the Conservative Party leader and had until the month before been Prime Minister, unexpectedly lost his seat in the Manchester East constituency, a seat which he had represented since 1885. The result in Manchester East saw a large 22.4% swing to the Liberal candidate Thomas Gardner Horridge, much larger than the national 5.4% swing to the Liberals.

The Liberal candidate in Manchester East had been helped by a pact with the local Labour Party. Horridge said of his victory that "East Manchester is essentially a Labour constituency and the great Labour party has supported my candidacy very thoroughly and very loyally". He also said that "[Manchester East constituents] have returned me, I take it, first to uphold free trade, next to deal with Chinese labour, and after that to support legislation on the lines laid down in the programme of the Labour party, with which I am heartily in accord".

Balfour's unseating became symbolic of the Conservative Party's landslide defeat. The result has since been called one of the biggest upsets in British political history and remains a rare instance of a former Prime Minister or Leader of the Opposition losing their seat in a general election.

=== Gladstone–MacDonald pact ===
In 1903, the Liberal Herbert Gladstone and Ramsay MacDonald of the Labour Representation Committee negotiated an informal agreement to ensure the anti-Conservative vote was not split between their two parties. The Gladstone–MacDonald pact meant that, in 31 of the 50 seats where LRC candidates stood, the Liberal Party did not put up a candidate. This proved helpful to both parties, as 24 of LRC 29 elected MPs came from constituencies where the Liberal Party agreed not to contest, while the pact allowed the Liberals to concentrate resources on Conservative/Liberal marginal constituencies.

== See also ==
- 1906 United Kingdom general election in England
- 1906 United Kingdom general election in Ireland
- 1906 United Kingdom general election in Scotland
- 1906 United Kingdom general election in Wales
- List of United Kingdom Parliament constituencies (1885–1918) by region
- List of MPs elected in the 1906 United Kingdom general election
- Parliamentary franchise in the United Kingdom 1885–1918
- Education Act 1902
