= Mid Glamorganshire (UK Parliament constituency) =

UK Parliament constituency (1885–1918)

- Former county constituency for the House of Commons

1885–1918
- Seats: one
- Replaced by: Neath and Aberavon

Mid Glamorganshire was a county constituency in Glamorganshire, Wales. It returned one Member of Parliament (MP) to the House of Commons of the Parliament of the United Kingdom, elected by the first past the post system.

== Overview ==
The constituency was created by the Redistribution of Seats Act 1885 for the 1885 general election, as a result of the division of the old two-member Glamorgan county constituency into five seats. The new constituency had an overwhelmingly working-class electorate. It was abolished for the 1918 general election.

== Boundaries ==
Created in the redistribution of seats in 1885 & from the old Glamorganshire constituency which had been in existence since 1541, the seat covered a wide area that included Maesteg, Llangeinor, Llynfi Valley, Aberpergwm, Margam Park, Briton Ferry, Glyncorrwg, Resolven. It was scrapped in the next redistribution of seats that took place in 1918.

== History ==
=== C.R.M. Talbot ===
Following the creation of the seat in 1885, this predominantly mining constituency, which included the Llyfni, Garw and Ogmore valleys, was initially represented by the Lord Lieutenant of Glamorgan, Christopher Rice Mansel Talbot, who had served as a member for the Glamorgan county seat since 1830. Despite his venerable status, a meeting of the Liberal Association held at Maesteg initially considered other candidates including Gwilym Williams and J. Carvell Williams. Although a leading member of the county aristocracy, Talbot did at this time support the principle of electing working men to parliament, especially in mining constituencies, and endorsed the efforts of the Rhondda miners to have William Abraham (Mabon) selected as Liberal candidate for the new Rhondda constituency.

Despite adopting a number of Gladstonian principles, Talbot remained opposed to Irish Home Rule, and this was inevitably going to present a difficulty at the 1886 general election. There was criticism of Talbot's views in the more industrial parts of the constituency, such as the Maesteg area. He wrote to his fellow county member, Hussey Vivian, that he had a meeting with Maesteg Liberals and although they were friendly to his face, 'I am told that [they] became quarrelsome after I left, and suggested various substitutes'. A number of alternative candidates were suggested, including Abel Thomas, John Cory, Thomas Williams of Merthyr, R.D. Burnie and Cyril Flower. However, none of these was prepared to consent to be nominated in opposition to Talbot. Some few weeks later, however, a meeting of the Association at Briton Ferry which, significantly, was not attended by delegates from some industrial districts, unanimously re-adopted Talbot, stating that he had 'made great progress towards the views they, as an association, held'.

=== Samuel T. Evans ===
Upon Talbot's death in 1890, his successor was Samuel Thomas Evans, a grocer's son from Skewen who was initially a militant nonconformist radical and supporter of Welsh Home Rule through Cymru Fydd. Evans, however, later toned down his radicalism on achieving ministerial office.

== Members of Parliament ==
Election	Member	Party
1885	Christopher Rice Mansel Talbot	Liberal
1892	Samuel Thomas Evans	Liberal
Apr 1910	Frederick William Gibbins	Liberal
Dec 1910	John Hugh Edwards	Liberal
1918	constituency abolished	

== Elections ==
=== Elections in the 1880s ===
General election 1885: Mid Glamorganshire
Party	Candidate	Votes	%	±%
Liberal	Christopher Rice Mansel Talbot	Unopposed		
Liberal win (new seat)				

General election 1886: Mid Glamorganshire
Party	Candidate	Votes	%	±%
Liberal	Christopher Rice Mansel Talbot	Unopposed		
Liberal hold				

=== Elections in the 1890s ===
1890 Mid Glamorganshire by-election
Party	Candidate	Votes	%	±%
Liberal	Samuel Thomas Evans	Unopposed		
Liberal hold				

S.T. Evans

General election 1892: Mid Glamorganshire
Party	Candidate	Votes	%	±%
Liberal	Samuel Thomas Evans	5,941	77.5	N/A
Conservative	F.C. Grove	1,725	22.5	New
Majority		4,216	55.0	N/A
Turnout		7,666	67.4	N/A
Registered electors		11,373		
Liberal hold		Swing	N/A	

General election 1895: Mid Glamorganshire
Party	Candidate	Votes	%	±%
Liberal	Samuel Thomas Evans	5,612	65.7	−11.8
Conservative	John Edwards-Vaughan	2,935	34.3	+11.8
Majority		2,677	31.4	−23.6
Turnout		8,547	68.2	+0.8
Registered electors		12,534		
Liberal hold		Swing	−11.8	

=== Elections in the 1900s ===
General election 1900: Mid Glamorganshire
Party	Candidate	Votes	%	±%
Liberal	Samuel Thomas Evans	7,027	75.8	+10.1
Conservative	H. Phillips	2,244	24.2	−10.1
Majority		4,783	51.6	+20.2
Turnout		9,271	67.8	−0.4
Registered electors		13,666		
Liberal hold		Swing	+10.1	

General election 1906: Mid Glamorganshire
Party	Candidate	Votes	%	±%
Liberal	Samuel Thomas Evans	Unopposed		
Liberal hold				

Evans is appointed Recorder of Swansea, prompting a by-election.

1906 Mid Glamorganshire by-election
Party	Candidate	Votes	%	±%
Liberal	Samuel Thomas Evans	Unopposed		
Liberal hold				

Evans is appointed Solicitor-General, prompting a by-election.

1908 Mid Glamorganshire by-election
Party	Candidate	Votes	%	±%
Liberal	Samuel Thomas Evans	Unopposed		
Liberal hold				

S.T. Evans

=== Elections in the 1910s ===
General election January 1910: Mid Glamorganshire
Party	Candidate	Votes	%	±%
Liberal	Samuel Thomas Evans	13,175	79.6	N/A
Conservative	Godfrey Williams	3,382	20.4	New
Majority		9,793	59.2	N/A
Turnout		16,557	82.7	N/A
Registered electors		20,017		
Liberal hold		Swing	N/A	

Evans is appointed president of the probate, divorce and admiralty division of the High Court of Justice, prompting a by-election.

April 1910 Mid Glamorganshire by-election
Party	Candidate	Votes	%	±%
Lib-Lab	Frederick William Gibbins	8,920	59.0	−20.6
Labour	Vernon Hartshorn	6,210	41.0	New
Majority		2,710	18.0	−41.2
Turnout		15,130	75.6	−7.1
Registered electors		20,017		
Lib-Lab hold		Swing	-10.3	

General election December 1910: Mid Glamorganshire
Party	Candidate	Votes	%	±%
Liberal	Hugh Edwards	7,624	55.5	−24.1
Labour	Vernon Hartshorn	6,102	44.5	N/A
Majority		1,522	11.0	−48.2
Turnout		13,726	68.6	−14.1
Registered electors		20,017		
Liberal hold		Swing		

General Election 1914–15

Another General Election was scheduled to take place before the end of 1915. The political parties had been making preparations for an election to take place and by July 1914, the following candidates had been selected;

- Liberal: Hugh Edwards
- Labour: Vernon Hartshorn
- Unionist:

== See also ==
- List of parliamentary constituencies in Mid Glamorgan
- Boundary Commission Map Report from 1885 showing detailed original maps used
- A map of Glamorganshire in 1885, showing its new divisions.
- The National Library for Wales:Dictionary of Welsh Biography (John Hugh Edwards)
- The National Library for Wales:Dictionary of Welsh Biography (Frederick William Gibbins)
- The National Library for Wales:Dictionary of Welsh Biography (Samuel Thomas Evans)
- The National Library for Wales:Dictionary of Welsh Biography (Vernon Hartshorn)

== Notes and references ==
- Leigh Rayment's Historical List of MPs – Constituencies beginning with "G" (part 1)

== Sources ==
=== Books and Journals ===
- Campbell, Thomas Methuen (2000). "C.R.M. Talbot 1803–1890". Morgannwg. 44: 66–104.
- Morgan, Kenneth O. (1960). "Democratic Politics in Glamorgan, 1884-1914". Morgannwg. 4: 5–27.
- Morgan, Kenneth O (1991). Wales in British Politics 1868–1922 (3rd ed.). Cardiff: University of Wales Press. ISBN 0708311245.
