= 1899 St Pancras East by-election =

UK Parliamentary by-election

The 1899 St Pancras East by-election was held on 12 July 1899 following the resignation of the incumbent Conservative MP, Robert Grant Webster in order to return to legal work. Webster vacated his Parliamentary seat by being appointed Steward of the Chiltern Hundreds on 1 July 1899.

== Candidates ==
The Conservative Party candidate was Thomas Wrightson who had been MP for Stockton from 1892 to 1895.

The Liberal Party candidate was Benjamin Francis Conn Costelloe. Costelloe was the London County Council member for Bethnal Green South West. He had previously served on the council for Stepney and Chelsea, and had contested this constituency at the previous general election.

== Result ==
1899 St Pancras East by-election
Party	Candidate	Votes	%	±%
Conservative	Thomas Wrightson	2,610	51.9	−1.0
Liberal	Benjamin Francis Conn Costelloe	2,423	48.1	+1.0
Majority		187	3.8	−2.0
Turnout		5,033	70.0	−0.6
Registered electors		7,191		
Conservative hold		Swing	−1.0	
