= December 1910 United Kingdom general election in England =

- 3–19 December 1910

All 461 English seats to the House of Commons
- Turnout: 82.1% (▼5.6 pp)
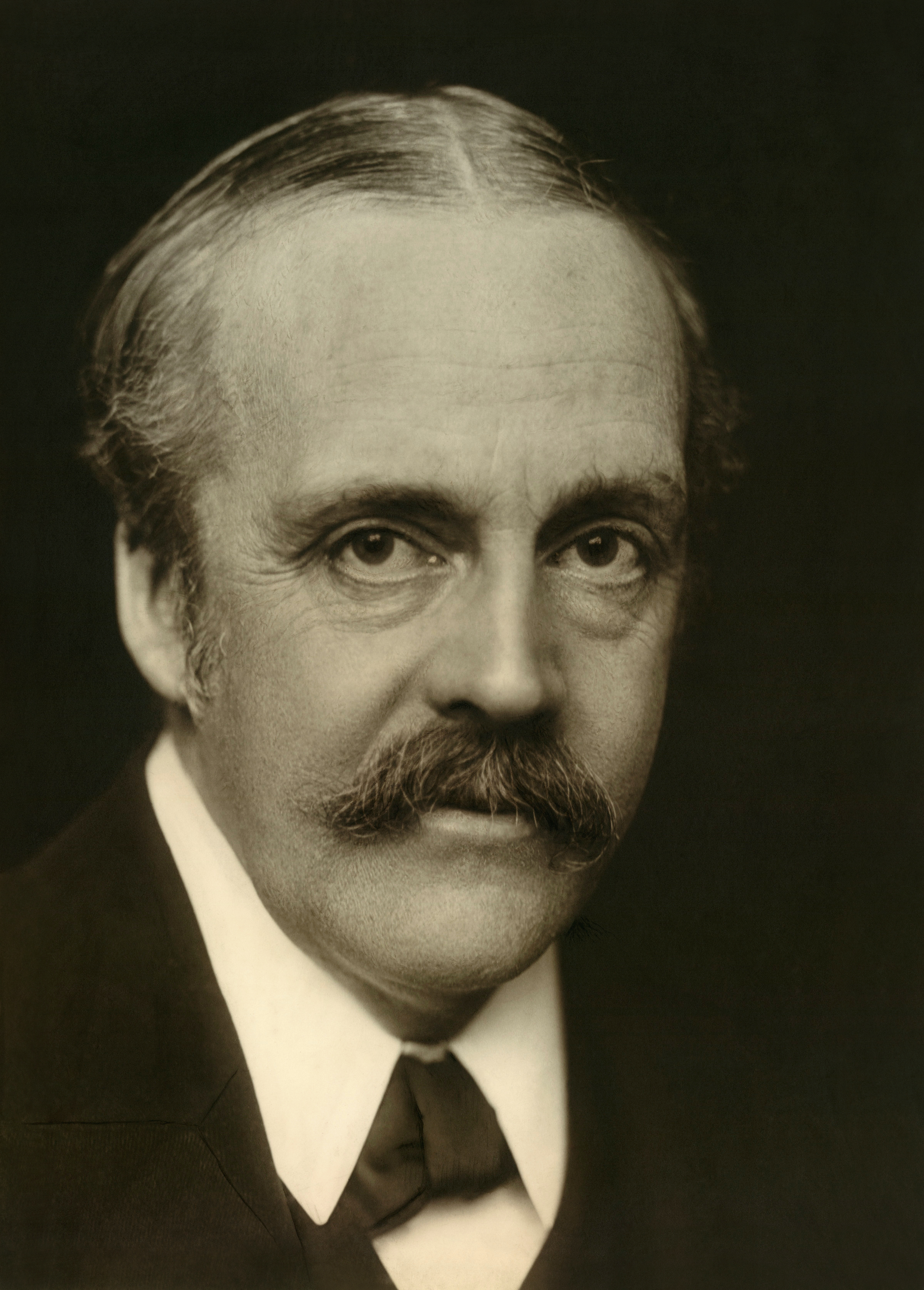

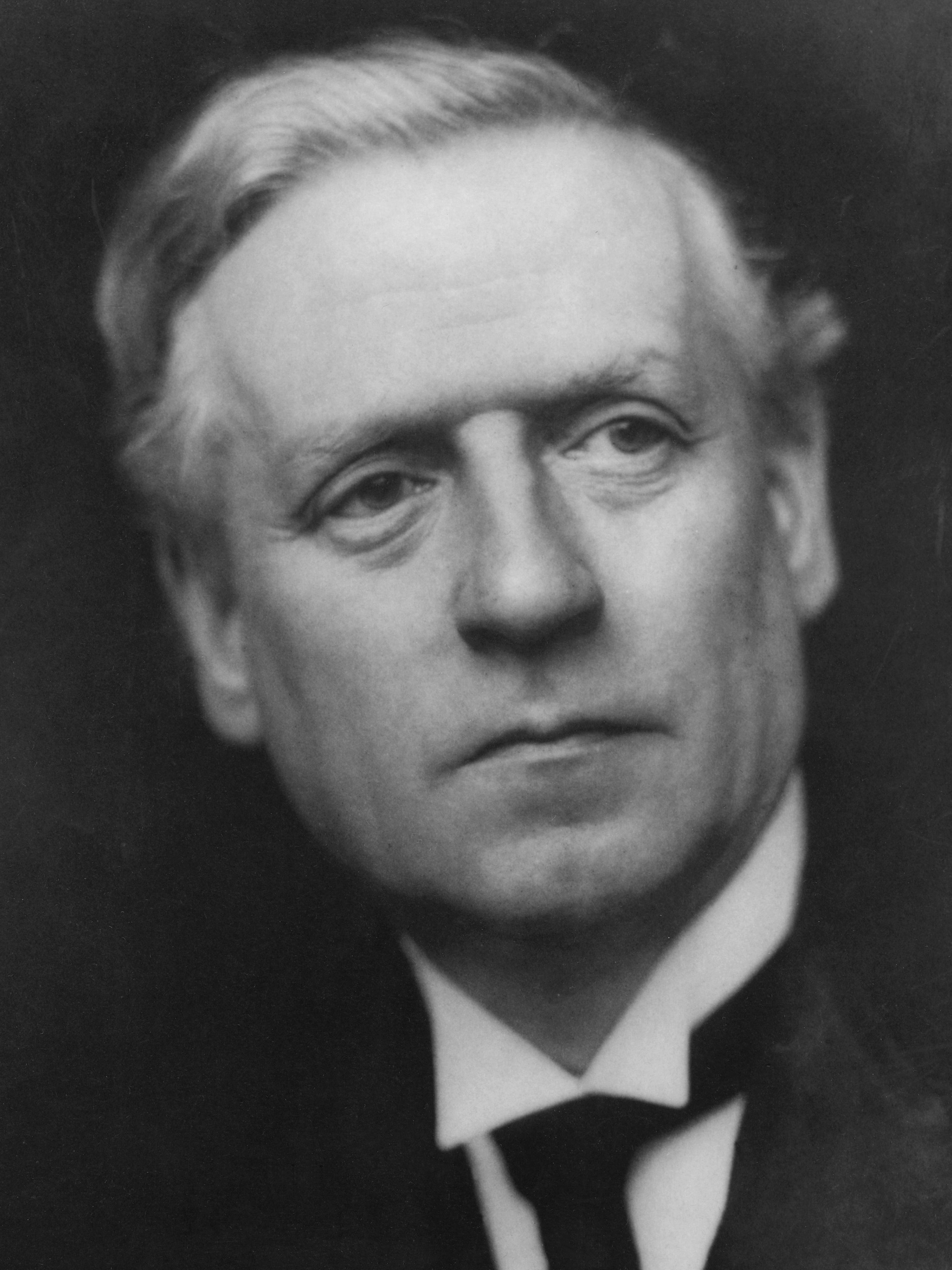

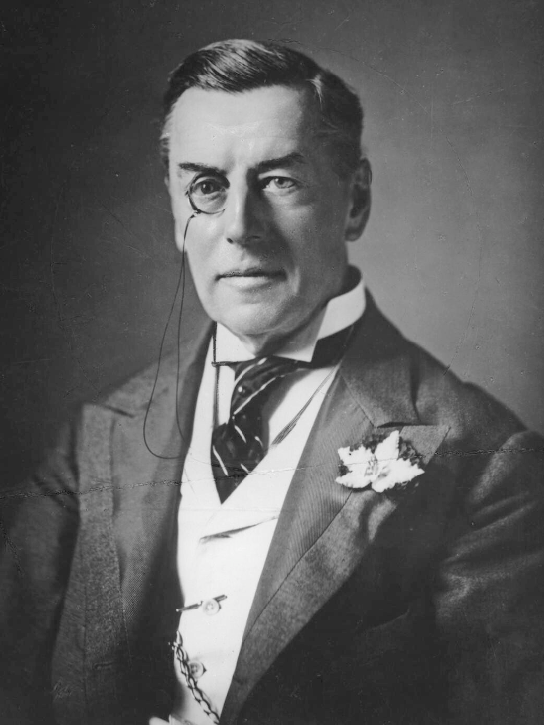

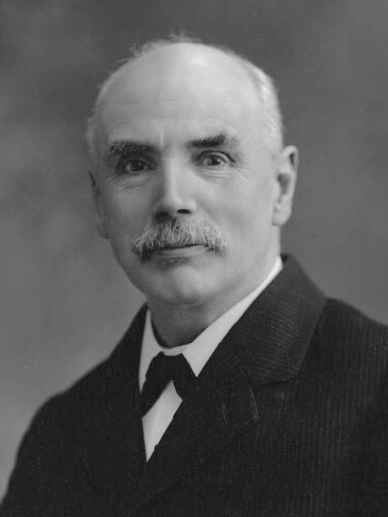
	First party	Second party
Leader	Arthur Balfour	H. H. Asquith
Party	Conservative	Liberal
Alliance	Conservative-Liberal Unionist
Leader since	11 June 1902	30 April 1908
Leader's seat	City of London	East Fife
Last election	201 seats, (Note: Combined results for borough, county and university seats) 42.0%	188 seats, 43.0%
Seats won	197 (Note: Figure includes Speaker of the House of Commons James Lowther in Penrith.)	186
Seat change	▼4	▼2
Popular vote	1,815,248 (Note: Total and percentage votes given here are for territorial constituencies only)	1,849,098
Percentage	43.6%	44.4%
Swing	▲1.6 pp	▲1.4 pp
	Third party	Fourth party
Leader	Joseph Chamberlain	George Barnes
Party	Liberal Unionist	Labour
Alliance	Conservative-Liberal Unionist
Leader since	1903	14 February 1910
Leader's seat	Birmingham West	Glasgow Blackfriars and Hutchesontown
Last election	37 seats, 7.3%	33 seats, 6.9%
Seats won	42	34
Seat change	▲5	▲1
Popular vote	220,049	300,142
Percentage	5.2%	6.4%
Swing	▼2.1 pp	▼0.5 pp

From 15 January to 10 February 1910, the December 1910 United Kingdom general election was held in England, to elect all 670 members of the House of Commons, with 461 seats being in England. 456 seats represented territorial constituencies contested under the first past the post electoral system, and several multi-member constituencies under the block voting system; and 5 additional seats represented the 3 university constituencies which returned members under different voting systems.

The election took place following the efforts of the Liberal government to pass its People's Budget in 1909, which raised taxes on the wealthy to fund social welfare programmes. The 1909 budget was only agreed to by the House of Lords in April 1910 after the January general election in which the Liberals and the Irish Parliamentary Party gained a majority.

Given the disagreements with the Conservative peers, the Government called a further election in December 1910 to get a mandate for the Parliament Act 1911, which would prevent the House of Lords from permanently blocking legislation linked to money bills ever again, and to obtain King George V's agreement to threaten to create sufficient Liberal peers to pass that act (in the event this did not prove necessary, as the Lords voted to curtail their own powers).

It was the first election held during the reign of King George V. It was also the last general election to be held over several days and the last to be held before the First World War.

== Candidates ==
Below is a table summarising the candidates of the December 1910 general election in England, excluding those in the university constituencies.

Affiliation	Candidates
Conservative Party	382
Liberal Party	362
Liberal Unionist Party	54
Labour Party	44
Independent Labour	3 (Note: The candidates that stood were Charles Nathaniel Lowe Shaw in Battersea, Thomas Frederick Richards in East Northamptonshire and Victor Grayson in Kennington.)
Social Democratic Federation	2 (Note: The candidates that stood were Leader Henry Hyndman in Burnley and Dan Irving in Rochdale.)
Independent Liberal	1 (Note: Candidate Richard Roberts stood in Hackney South.)
Independent Conservative	1 (Note: Candidates Francis Bennett-Goldney stood in Canterbury.)
Suffragist	1 (Note: Candidate Herbert Jacobs stood in St Pancras East.)
Nationalist Party	1 (Note: Candidate T. P. O'Connor stood in Liverpool Scotland.)
Total	851

== Analysis ==
=== Liberal Party ===
The Liberal Party under the leadership of H. H. Asquith saw a 44.4% vote share, which was a slight decrease of 1.4%. The Liberal Party lost 16 seats to the Conservative Party, but also gained 16 seats from the Conservatives. Outside of this, it gained Cricklade, Manchester South West and Cheltenham from the Liberal Unionists and gained one seat in Sunderland, but lost Bodmin, Tavistock, Torquay, Great Grimsby, Darlington and Ashburton to the Liberal Unionists.

Several Liberal-Labour candidates won or held seats at this election with, and giving support to, the Liberal Party. These were Dartford, Battersea, St Pancras East, Stoke-upon-Trent, Salford North, Mid Durham, Morpeth and Wansbeck. As such, the party saw a net decrease of just 2 seats. The Liberals took 186 seats, within which 8 were held by Liberal-Labour MPs.

Nevertheless, the party nationally 271 seats, one seat less and the Conservatives and Liberal Unionists combined, but retained its position in government with the support of the Irish Parliamentary Party.

=== Conservative Party ===
The Conservative Party took around 43.6%, an increase 1.6% in vote share when compared with the previous election. Between it and its ally, the Liberal Unionist Party, the alliance of the parties took 48.8% of the vote in England, and 234 county and borough constituency seats, and all of the English university constituency seats. Overall, the Conservative Party lost a net of 4 seats.

Between it and the Liberal Party, there were several seat transfers in England, but with overall very little change in terms of seats for the Conservatives. It gained Islington North, St Pancras West, King's Lynn, Dudley, High Peak, Melton, Eskdale, Ashton-under-Lyne, Darwen, Liverpool Exchange, Salford South, Warrington, Altrincham and Birkenhead from the Liberal Party. It also gained both seats in Plymouth from the Liberals. However, it lost Banbury, Dartford, Rochester, Peckham, Southwark West, Stepney, Bedford, Newmarket, Lowestoft, Saffron Walden, Leek, Coventry, Louth, Lincolnshire, Cockermouth, Burnley and Wakefield to the Liberal Party. As such, between the Liberals and Conservatives, there were 16 losses and 16 gains for the Conservatives.

Outside of this, it gained St Helens and Wigan from the Labour Party. But, it lost Bow and Bromley, Woolwich, Whitehaven to Labour, as well as one of the two seats in Sunderland. Additionally, it lost Canterbury to Independent Conservative Francis Bennett-Goldney and lost Lewes in exchange with the Liberal Unionists.

=== Liberal Unionist Party ===
The Liberal Unionist Party, led by Joseph Chamberlain saw a 2.1% decrease in vote to around 5.2% of the vote, but an overall gain of 5 seats. The party retained Totnes, East Somerset, Aylesbury, one of the two seats in Portsmouth, Mile End, Westminster St George's, Hannover Square, St Pancras South, Mid Norfolk, Ludlow, Burton, Handsworth, West Staffordshire, Ross, Droitwich, East Worcestershire, West Derbyshire and Durham.

It also retained its university constituency seats in London University and Oxford University. It also held its metropolitan Birmingham seats of Birmingham Bordesley, Birmingham Central, Birmingham North, Birmingham South and Birmingham West. Of some dispute, however, is some distinction between whether the party had held some other seats, due to several originally being classed as Conservatives holds. Subsequent research had instead re-classed the following seats as Liberal Unionist holds: Maldon, Hitchin, Watford, North Lonsdale, Chertsey, Guildford, Paddington North, Cambridge, Penryn and Falmouth and Walsall.

The Party gained Bodmin, Tavistock, Torquay, Great Grimsby and Darlington from the Liberals. Of some dispute, as candidates were originally classed as Conservatives, is some gains. Liberal Unionist likely also gained Ashburton from the Liberals, and Newton from Labour. It also gained Lewes from the Conservative Party, with sitting MP William Campion retaining the seat in the 1910 Lewes by-election, with the Conservatives not standing against its allied party.

However, it lost Cricklade and Manchester South West to the Liberal Party. Where the party may have took the seat of Cheltenham instead of the Conservatives at the previous election, it also lost the seat to the Liberal Party. With 8 gains and 3 losses overall, the party took 42 seats in England at this election. This was the last general election in which the Liberal Unionist would stand candidates, owing to the party official merging with its long-time ally, the Conservative Party to form the modern Conservative and Unionist Party.

=== Labour Party ===
The Labour Party, under the very short-term leadership of George Barnes, took 6.4% of the vote, a decrease of 0.5% of the vote with the party standing significantly fewer seats than in the previous election. It retained its seats of Deptford, West Ham South, Hanley, North West Staffordshire, Nuneaton, Chesterfield, Mid Derbyshire, North East Derbyshire, Barrow and Furness, Clitheroe, Gorton, Ince, Manchester East, Manchester North East, Westhoughton, Barnard Castle, Chester-le-Street, Bradford West, Hallamshire, Leeds East, Normanton and Sheffield Attercliffe. It also held one of the two seats in Norwich, Derby, Leicester, Blackburn, Bolton, Stockport, Newcastle-upon-Tyne and Halifax.

Labour gained Bow and Bromley, Woolwich, Whitehaven from the Conservatives. It also gained one of the two seats in Sunderland. However, it lost Newton to the Liberal Unionist Party, and St Helens and Wigan to the Conservatives. With 4 gains and 3 losses, the party increased its representation by seat to 34 seats in England.

== Seats summary ==
Below is a table summarising the total number of seats, gains and losses for each party in both the territorial county and borough constituencies and the university constituencies.

Party	Seats				
Party	Total	Gains	Losses	Net	Of all (%)
Conservative-Liberal Unionist	239	26	25	▲1	51.8
Conservative	197	18	22	▼4	42.7
Liberal Unionist	42	8	3	▲5	9.1
Liberal	186 (Note: Includes 8 Liberal-Labour MPs.)	20	22	▼2	40.3
Labour	34	4	3	▲1	7.4
Ind. Conservative	1	1	0	▲1	0.2
Irish Nationalist	1	0	0	Steady	0.2
Other non-contested	0	0	1	▼1	—
Total	461				

== County and borough results ==
Below is a table summarising the constituency results of the December 1910 general election in England, excluding the result in the university constituencies.

Party	Seats					Aggregate votes		
Party	Total	Gains	Losses	Net	Of total (%)	Total	Of total (%) (Note: Adjusted for multi-member constituencies.)	Change (%)
Conservative-Liberal Unionist	234	26	25	▲1	51.3	2,035,297	48.8	▼0.5
Conservative	194	18	22	▼4	42.5	1,815,248	43.6	▲1.6
Liberal Unionist	40	8	3	▲5	8.8	220,049	5.2	▼2.1
Liberal	186 (Note: Includes 8 Liberal-Labour MPs.)	20	22	▼2	40.8	1,849,098	44.4	▲1.4
Labour	34	4	3	▲1	7.5	300,142	6.5	▼0.5
Social Democratic Federation	0	0	0	Steady	—	5,711	0.1	▼0.2
Irish Nationalist	1 (Note: T. P. O'Connor in Liverpool Scotland.)	0	0	Steady	0.2	2,458	0.1	Steady
Independent Labour	0	0	0	Steady	—	2,316	0.1	Steady
Independent Liberal	0	0	0	Steady	—	1,946	0.1	▲0.1
Ind. Conservative	1 (Note: Francis Bennett-Goldney in Canterbury.)	1	0	▲1	0.2	1,635	0.0	Steady
Suffragist	0	New			—	22	0.0	New
Other non-contested	0	—N/a		▼1 (Note: Samuel Storey in Sunderland.)	—	0	0.0	—N/a
Total	456			0	100.0	4,198,625	100.0	0.0
Registered voters, and turnout						4,749,380 (Note: Electorate in contested constituencies. The total electorate was 5,774,892.)	82.1	▼5.6

=== Popular vote ===
Popular vote
Liberal	44.4%
Conservative	43.6%
Labour	6.4%
Liberal Unionist	5.2%
Irish Nationalist	0.1%
Others	0.3%

Popular vote (alliances)
Con-LU	48.8%
Liberal	44.4%
Labour	6.4%
Irish Nationalist	0.1%
Others	0.3%

=== Parliament seats ===
Parliament seats
Conservative	42.5%
Liberal	40.8%
Liberal Unionist	8.8%
Labour	7.5%
Ind. Conservative	0.2%
Irish Nationalist	0.2%

Parliament seats (alliances)
Con-LU	51.3%
Liberal	40.8%
Labour	7.5%
Ind. Conservative	0.2%
Irish Nationalist	0.2%

== University constituency results ==
=== University results summary ===
Below is a table summarising the seats and vote share of the English university constituencies in the December 1910 general election.

Party	Seats				Aggregate votes	
Party	Total	Gains	Losses	Net	Total	Of all (%)
Conservative-Liberal Unionist	5	0	0	Steady	2,579	58.1
Liberal Unionist	2	0	0	Steady	2,579	58.1
Conservative	3	0	0	Steady	0	0.0
Liberal	0	0	0	Steady	1,857	41.9
Total	5				4,436	

=== Cambridge University ===
The constituency for Cambridge University returned two Members of Parliament using the Plurality block voting electoral system. The electorate consisted of graduates of the university.

General election December 1910: Cambridge University (2 seats)
Party	Candidate	Votes	%	±%
Conservative	Samuel Butcher	Unopposed		
Conservative	John Rawlinson	Unopposed		
Conservative hold				
Conservative hold				

=== London University ===
The constituency for London University returned one Member of Parliament using the First-past-the-post electoral system. The electorate consisted of graduates of the university.

General election December 1910: London University
Party	Candidate	Votes	%	±%
Liberal Unionist	Philip Magnus	2,579	58.14	+0.49
Liberal	Victor Horsley	1,857	41.86	−0.49
Majority		722	16.28	+0.98
Turnout		4,436	73.08	−1.93
Registered electors		6,070		
Liberal Unionist hold		Swing	+0.49	

=== Oxford University ===
The constituency for Oxford University returned two Members of Parliament using the Plurality block voting electoral system. The electorate consisted of graduates of the university.

General election December 1910: Oxford University (2 seats)
Party	Candidate	Votes	%	±%
Liberal Unionist	Sir William Anson	Unopposed		
Conservative	Lord Hugh Cecil	Unopposed		
Liberal Unionist hold				
Conservative hold				

== See also ==
- December 1910 United Kingdom general election in Ireland
- December 1910 United Kingdom general election in Scotland
- December 1910 United Kingdom general election in Wales
- List of United Kingdom Parliament constituencies (1885–1918) by region
