= December 1910 United Kingdom general election in Scotland =

- 3–19 December 1910

All 72 Scottish seats to the House of Commons
- Turnout: 81.8% (▼2.9 pp)
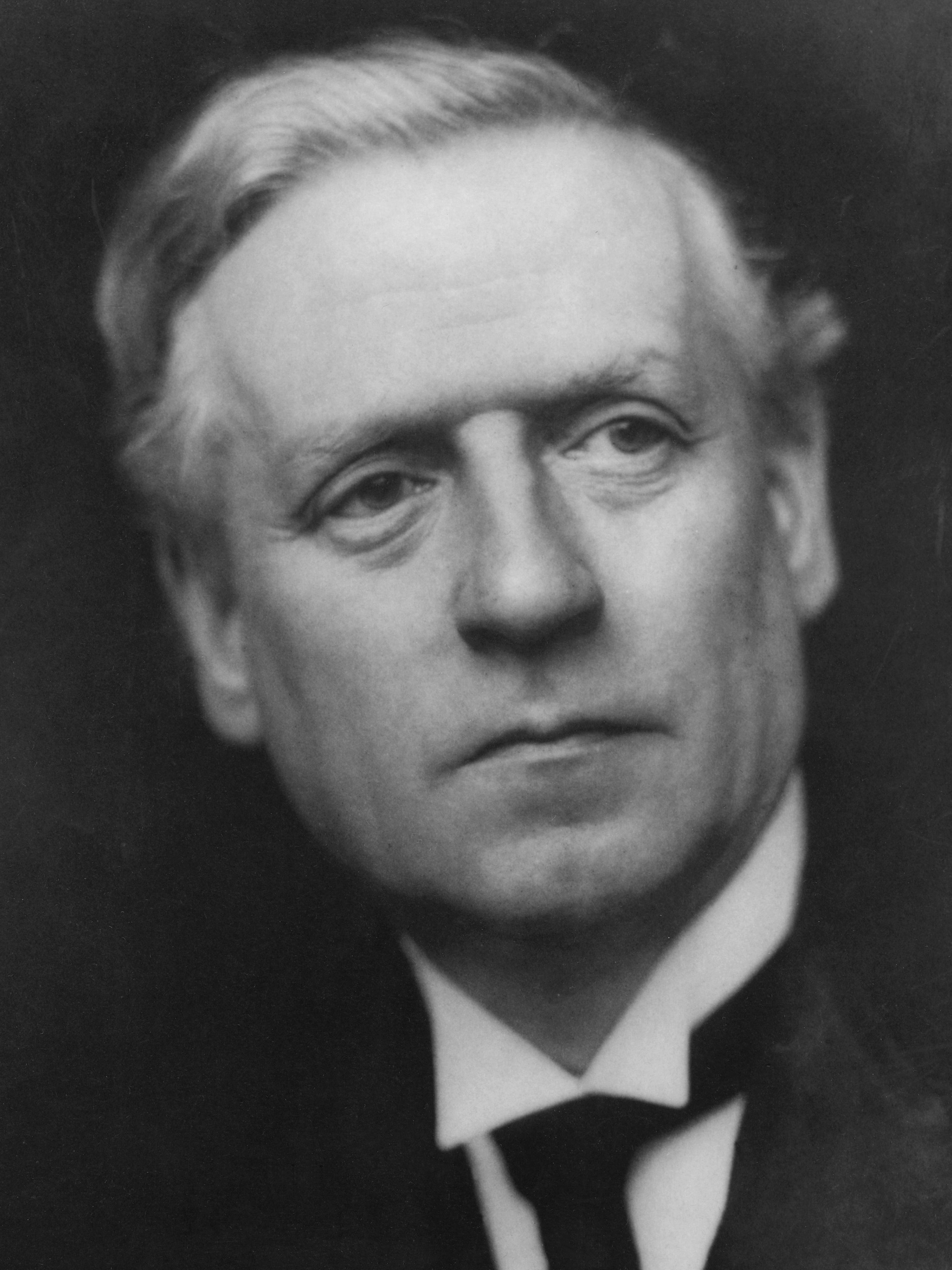

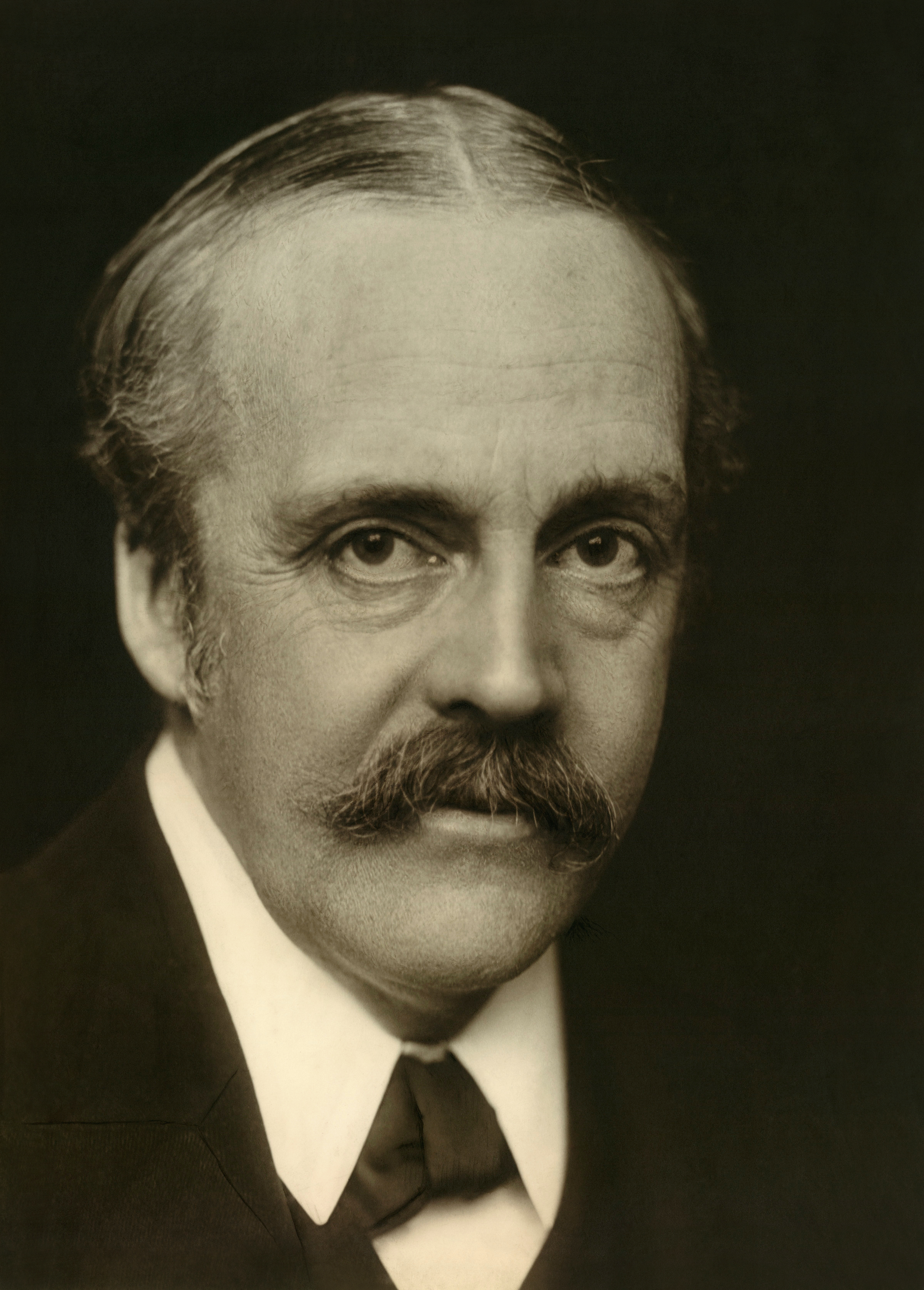

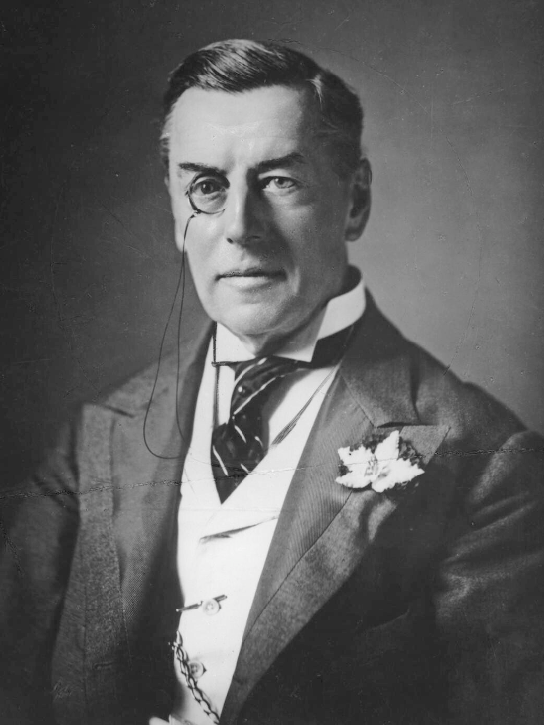

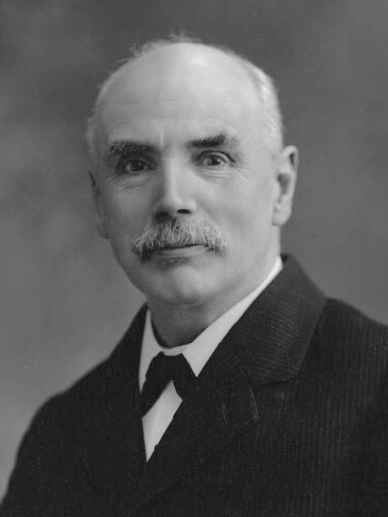
	First party	Second party
Leader	H. H. Asquith	Arthur Balfour
Party	Liberal	Conservative
Alliance	Liberal	Conservative-Liberal Unionist
Leader since	30 April 1908	11 June 1902
Leader's seat	East Fife	City of London
Last election	58 seats, (Note: Combined results for burgh, county and university seats) 54.2%	8 seats, 27.6%
Seats won	58	7
Seat change	Steady	▼1
Popular vote	306,378 (Note: Total and percentage votes given here are for territorial constituencies only)	184,448
Percentage	53.6%	32.2%
Swing	▼0.6% pp	▲4.6% pp
	Third party	Fourth party
Leader	Joseph Chamberlain	George Barnes
Party	Liberal Unionist	Labour
Alliance	Conservative-Liberal Unionist
Leader since	1903	14 February 1910
Leader's seat	Birmingham West	Glasgow Blackfriars and Hutchesontown
Last election	3 seats, 12.0%	2 seats, 5.1%
Seats won	4	3
Seat change	▲1	▲1
Popular vote	60,337	24,633
Percentage	10.4%	3.6%
Swing	▼1.6 pp	▼1.5% pp
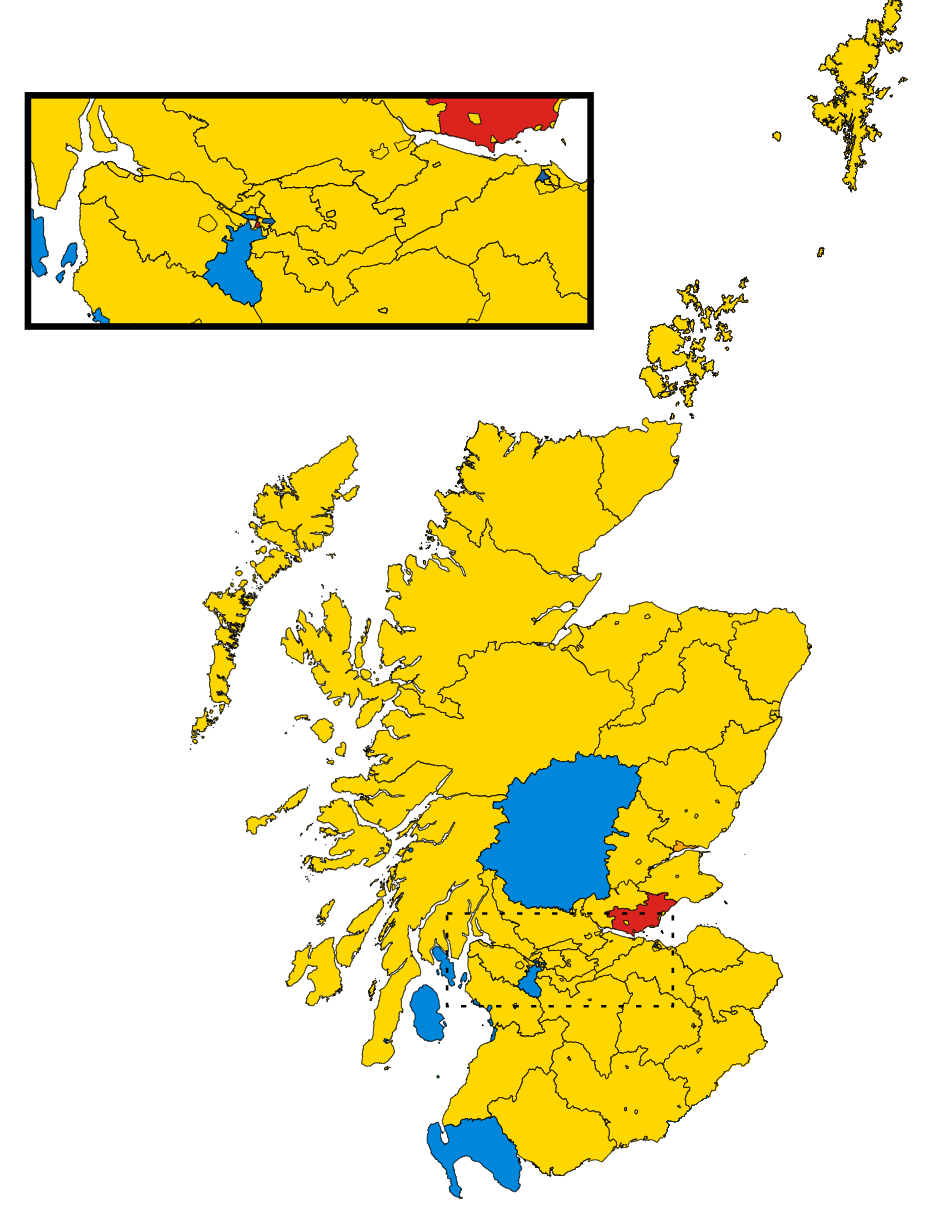
- Results of the December 1910 election in Scotland for the county and burgh seats

From 3 to 19 December 1910, the December 1910 United Kingdom general election was held in the United Kingdom. and members were returned for all 72 seats in Scotland. Scotland was allocated 72 seats in total, with 70 territorial seats, comprising 32 burgh constituencies and 37 county constituencies. (Note: One burgh seat, Dundee, was represented by two members of parliament.) There were also two university constituencies, Glasgow and Aberdeen Universities and Edinburgh and St Andrews Universities.

The election was held less than a year after the January general election in which the Liberals and the Irish Parliamentary Party gained a majority in the House of Commons. Given the disagreements with the Conservative peers, the Government called a further election in December 1910 to get a mandate for the Parliament Act 1911, which would prevent the House of Lords from permanently blocking legislation linked to money bills ever again, and to obtain King George V's agreement to threaten to create sufficient Liberal peers to pass that act (in the event this did not prove necessary, as the Lords voted to curtail their own powers). The election saw little change in the political make-up of Scotland, with no party registering a net change of more than a single seat.

It was the first election held during the reign of King George V. It was also the last general election to be held over several days and the last to be held before the First World War.

Three of the main party leaders had Scottish links: Liberal leader Asquith had represented East Fife since 1886; Conservative Party leader Arthur Balfour was born in East Lothian; whilst Labour leader George Barnes was born in Dundee and also represented the seat of Glasgow Blackfriars and Hutchesontown.

== Candidates ==
Below is a table summarising the candidates of the December 1910 general election in Scotland, excluding those in the university constituencies.

Affiliation	Candidates
Scottish Liberal Party	67
Conservative Party	43
Liberal Unionist Party	14
Labour Party	5
Independent Conservative	1 (Note: Candidate Archibald Macleod stood in Caithness.)
Scottish Prohibition Party	1 (Note: Candidate Edwin Scrymgeour stood in Dundee.)
Women's Suffrage	1 (Note: Candidate William Julius Mirrlees stood in Glasgow Camlachie.)
Total	132

== Analysis ==
=== Liberal Party ===
In Scotland the opposition Liberals under Henry Campbell-Bannerman won a crushing victory, winning 53.6% of vote and 58 out of Scotland's 72 seats. Once again, the party saw no overall change in terms of seats, after having taken 58 seats in the 1906 general election and January 1910 general election.

The Party won two seats: one from the Conservative Party, and another from the Independent Liberal-held constituency of Glasgow Tradeston. In Glasgow Tradeston, Liberal Unionist-turned-Independent Liberal Archibald Corbett had official returned to the Liberal Party after several years, and stood as its official candidate at this election. Corbett personally retained the seat, however it represented a gain for the Liberal Party. Additionally, the Liberal Party lost two seats: one to the Liberal Unionists; and one to the Labour Party.

=== Conservatives and Liberal Unionists ===
The Conservative Party, which was in an alliance with the Liberal Unionist Party in Parliament and at the constituency level, also saw little change in seats at the election. With the Conservative party standing 43 candidates, it took around 32.2% of the vote, an increase of 4.6%. The party held the university constituency seat of Glasgow and Aberdeen Universities. It also held the county and borough seats of West Perthshire, East Renfrewshire, Ayr Burghs, Buteshire, Glasgow Central, Wigtownshire. However, the Conservatives lost Kirkcudbright Stewartry to the Liberal Party.

The Liberal Unionist Party won around 10.4% of the vote, a small 1.6% drop in terms of vote share, with the party standing just 14 candidates in Scotland which was fewer than in any election in which the party stood. The Liberal Unionists retained the university constituency of Edinburgh and St Andrews Universities, as well as the county and burgh seats of Glasgow Camlachie and Edinburgh West. It also gained St Andrews Burghs, wherein former Liberal Unionist MP, William Anstruther-Gray returned to Parliament after having lost his seat in January 1910.

Overall, the Conservatives lost 1 seat to a total of 7 seats, while the Liberal Unionists gained 1 seat at 4 seats. The alliance between the two parties again held at the election a total of 11 MPs in Scotland, with a combined vote share of 42.6%, an overall increase of 3.0%. This was the last general election in which the Liberal Unionist would stand candidates, owing to the party official merging with its long-time ally, the Conservative Party to form the modern Conservative and Unionist Party.

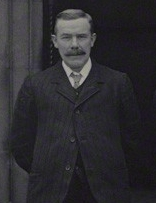
William Adamson

=== Labour Party ===
The Labour Party under new and very short-term leader, George Barnes, retained Glasgow Blackfriars and Hutchesontown, wherein George Barnes was the MP. Alexander Wilkie retained one of the two seats in Dundee. The party also gained West Fife from the Liberal Party, with future Leader of the Labour Party William Adamson entering Parliament.

The party therefore increased its seat count from 2 to 3 MPs, though stood fewer candidates than in the previous election, and consequently only took 3.6% of the vote in Scotland.

== Seats summary ==
Below is a table summarising the total number of seats, gains and losses for each party in both the territorial county and burgh constituencies and the university constituencies.

Party	Seats				
Party	Total	Gains	Losses	Net	Of all (%)
Liberal	58	2	2	Steady	80.6
Conservative-Liberal Unionist	11	1	1	Steady	15.3
Conservative	7	0	1	▼1	9.7
Liberal Unionist	4	1	0	▲1	5.6
Labour	3	1	0	▲1	4.2
Other non-contested	0	—N/a		▼1	—
Total	72				

== County and burgh results ==
Party	Seats					Aggregate votes		
Party	Total	Gains	Losses	Net	Of total (%)	Total	Of total (%) (Note: Adjusted for multi-member constituencies.)	Change (%)
Liberal	58	2	2	Steady	82.9	306,378	53.6	▼0.6
Conservative-Liberal Unionist	9	1	1	▼1	12.9	244,785	42.6	▲3.0
Conservative	6	0	1	▼1	10.0	184,448	32.2	▲4.6
Liberal Unionist	3	1	0	▲1	2.9	60,337	10.4	▼1.6
Labour	3	1	0	Steady	2.9	24,633	3.6	▼1.5
Scottish Prohibition	0	0	0	Steady	—	1,825	0.2	▲0.1
Ind. Conservative	0	Did not stand in Jan. 1910			—	87	0.0	—N/a
Women's Suffrage	0	New			—	35	0.0	New
Other non-contested	0	—N/a		▼1	—	0	0.0	New
Total	70			0	100.0	577,743	100.0	0.0
Registered voters, and turnout						688,955 (Note: Electorate in contested constituencies. The total electorate was 779,012.)	81.8	▼2.9

=== Popular vote ===
Popular vote
Liberal	53.6%
Conservative	32.2%
Liberal Unionist	10.4%
Labour	3.6%
Other	0.2%

Popular vote (alliances)
Liberal	53.6%
Con-LU	42.6%
Labour	3.6%
Other	0.2%

=== Parliament seats ===
Parliamentary seats
Liberal	80.6%
Conservative	9.7%
Liberal Unionist	5.6%
Labour	4.2%

Parliamentary seats (alliances)
Liberal	80.6%
Con-LU	15.3%
Labour	4.2%

== University constituency results ==
The two university constituencies each elected an additional member to the house. In this election both seats were uncontested, with the sitting members being returned unopposed.

=== Edinburgh and St Andrews Universities ===
General election December 1910: Edinburgh and St Andrews Universities
Party	Candidate	Votes	%	±%
Liberal Unionist	Robert Finlay	Unopposed		
Liberal Unionist hold				

=== Glasgow and Aberdeen Universities ===
General election December 1910: Glasgow and Aberdeen Universities
Party	Candidate	Votes	%	±%
Conservative	Henry Craik	Unopposed		
Conservative hold				

== See also ==
- December 1910 United Kingdom general election in England
- December 1910 United Kingdom general election in Ireland
- December 1910 United Kingdom general election in Wales
- List of United Kingdom Parliament constituencies (1885–1918) by region
