= December 1910 United Kingdom general election in Wales =

- 3–19 December 1910

All 34 Welsh seats to the House of Commons
- Turnout: 78.3% (▼6.6 pp)
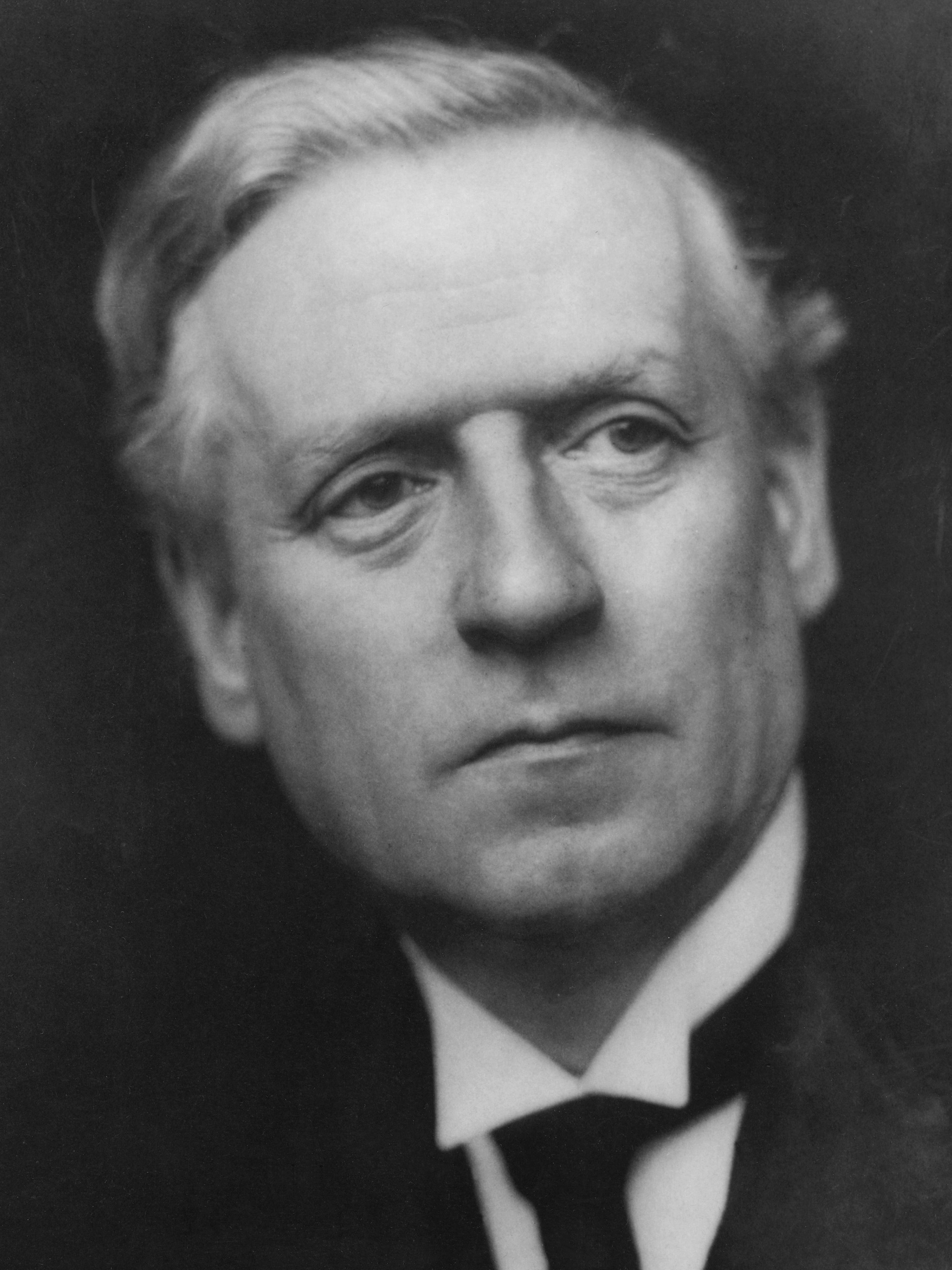

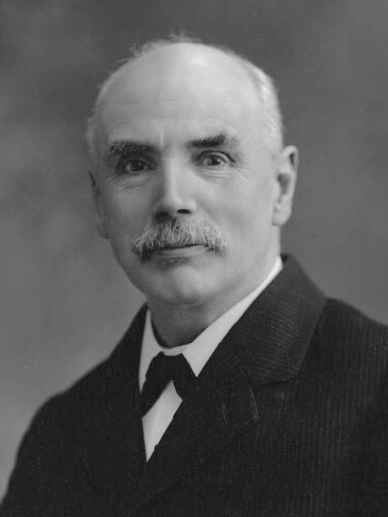

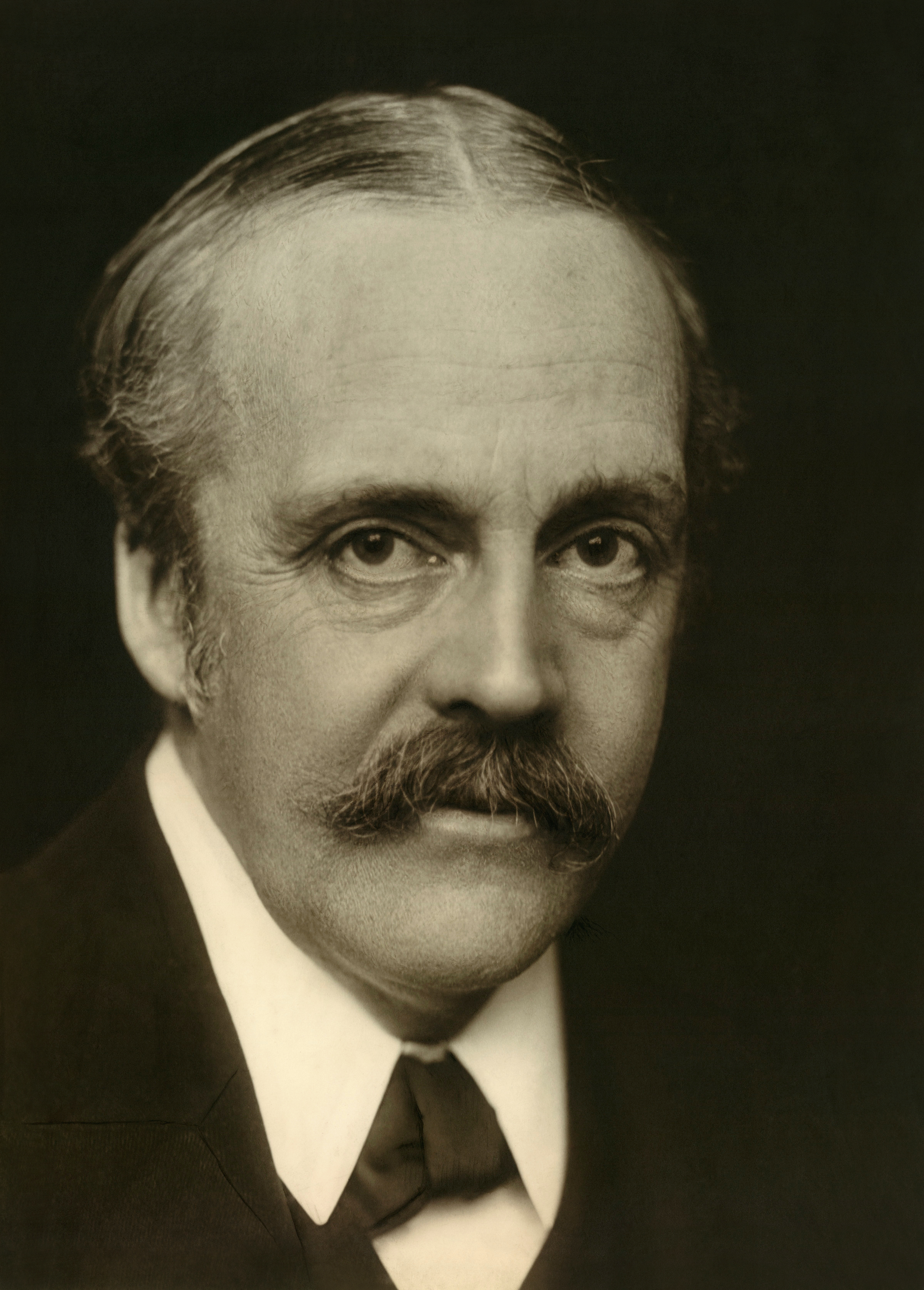

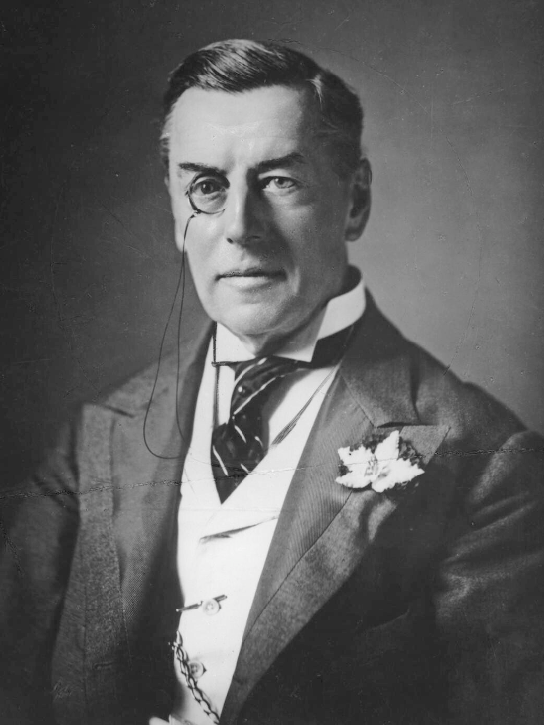
	First party	Second party
Leader	H. H. Asquith	George Barnes
Party	Liberal	Labour
Leader since	30 April 1908	14 February 1910
Leader's seat	East Fife	Glasgow Blackfriars and Hutchesontown
Last election	27 seats, 52.3%	5 seats, 14.9%
Seats won	26	5
Seat change	▼1	Steady
Popular vote	117,533	47,027
Percentage	47.9%	17.8%
Swing	▼4.4 pp	▲2.9 pp
	Third party	Fourth party
Leader	Arthur Balfour	Joseph Chamberlain
Party	Conservative	Liberal Unionist
Alliance	Conservative-Liberal Unionist	Conservative-Liberal Unionist
Leader since	11 June 1902	1903
Leader's seat	City of London	Birmingham West
Last election	2 seats, 31.4%	0 seats, 0.5%
Seats won	3	0
Seat change	▲1	Steady
Popular vote	75,823	5,277
Percentage	32.7%	1.1%
Swing	▲1.3 pp	▲0.6 pp

From 15 January to 10 February 1910, the December 1910 United Kingdom general election was held in Wales, to elect all 670 members of the House of Commons, with 34 seats being in Wales. 34 seats represented territorial constituencies contested under the first past the post electoral system amongst 33 constituencies.

The election took place following the efforts of the Liberal government to pass its People's Budget in 1909, which raised taxes on the wealthy to fund social welfare programmes. The 1909 budget was only agreed to by the House of Lords in April 1910 after the January general election in which the Liberals and the Irish Parliamentary Party gained a majority.

Given the disagreements with the Conservative peers, the Government called a further election in December 1910 to get a mandate for the Parliament Act 1911, which would prevent the House of Lords from permanently blocking legislation linked to money bills ever again, and to obtain King George V's agreement to threaten to create sufficient Liberal peers to pass that act (in the event this did not prove necessary, as the Lords voted to curtail their own powers).

It was the first election held during the reign of King George V. It was also the last general election to be held over several days and the last to be held before the First World War. It was the last election at which the unified Liberal Party (owing to its split before the 1918 election) would hold a majority of seats in Wales in its own right.

== Candidates ==
Below is a table summarising the candidates of the December 1910 general election in Wales.

Affiliation	Candidates
Liberal Party	30 (Note: Includes Liberal-Labour candidate Clement Edwards who stood in East Glamorganshire.)
Conservative Party	19
Labour Party	7
Liberal Unionist Party	1 (Note: Candidate John Henry Watts stood in Merthyr Tydfil.)
Independent Labour	1 (Note: Candidate John Henry Williams stood in East Carmarthenshire.)
Total	58

== Analysis ==
=== Liberal Party ===
Across the United Kingdom, there were very little in terms of seat changes across the county compared with the January 1910 United Kingdom general election, with the same applying in Wales. The Liberal Party under H. H. Asquith, however, saw a 4.4% decrease in vote share and a loss of the majority vote share in Wales it had held since the 1865 United Kingdom general election. Nevertheless, it only took a loss of 1 seat to the Conservative party.

The Liberal Party retained the seats of Anglesey, Arfon, Eifion, East Denbighshire, Flint Boroughs, Flintshire, Merioneth, Montgomeryshire, Breconshire, Cardiganshire, Carmarthen Boroughs, East Carmarthenshire, West Carmarthenshire, West Denbighshire, Pembrokeshire, Caernarfon, East Glamorganshire, Mid Glamorganshire, Swansea Town, Swansea District, Monmouth Boroughs, South Monmouthshire, Pembroke and Haverfordwest and North Monmouthshire. The party also held one of the two seats in the two-member constituency of Merthyr Tydfil.

Liberal-Labour candidate and former MP, Clement Edwards, had remained loyal to the Liberal Party and remained standing as a joint candidate with a union unlike former Liberal-Labour candidates. He returned to Parliament in East Glamorganshire, replacing the retiring Liberal MP Alfred Thomas, who had been raised to a peerage. Clement, however, would not remain with the Liberal Party following the election, and move constituencies in England under a new party (The National Democratic and Labour Party) before the 1918 general election. This was the last election at which the Liberal-labour movement would stand candidates, with the organisation winding up in 1918.

However, it lost two seats to the Conservative party, but gained Radnorshire from the Conservatives, which it had lost in the last election. Sir Francis Edwards, who head previously held Radnorshire for the Liberals, returned to Parliament.

=== Conservatives and Liberal Unionists ===
The Conservative Party, which was within a long-term alliance with the Liberal Unionist Party saw a small swing in its favour, seeing an increase in its vote by 1.3% with the Liberal Unionists increaing by 0.6% to roughly 1.1% in Wales. Therefore, the alliance saw an overall 1.9% increase in vote share in Wales. The Conservatives, although losing Radnorshire, won Montgomery and Cardiff from the Liberal Party. It otherwise held Denbigh Boroughs. The Conservatives therefore increased by one seat in Wales.

The Liberal Unionist Party once againe only stood one candidate in Wales. John Henry Watts stood in Merthyr Tydfil. However, he placed third in the count behind Labour and the Liberal candidates in the two-member constituency, and was therefore unsuccessful. He achieved a 1.1% vote for the party overall in Wales (adjusted proportionally for a two-member constituency), an increase of 0.6% on the last election. This was the last general election in which the Liberal Unionist would stand candidates, owing to the party official merging with its long-time ally, the Conservative Party to form the modern Conservative and Unionist Party.

=== Labour Party ===
The Labour Party under its new and very short-lived leader, George Barnes, stood 7 candidates in Wales. The former leader of the Labour Party, Keir Hardie, retained his seat, being one of the two in Merthyr Tydfil. All of it others Welsh MPs retained their seats. These were William Abraham in Rhondda, William Brace in South Glamorganshire, Thomas Richards in West Monmouthshire, and John Williams in Gower. As such, Labour maintained its seat count at 5, with an increased vote share by 2.9% to 17.8% across Wales.

Its other two candidates ––Charles Stanton in East Glamorganshire and Vernon Hartshorn Mid Glamorganshire–– were unsuccessful. However, Stanton, who lost against Clement Edwards in East Glamorganshire, would join the National Democratic and Labour Party with Edwards, and stand as a successful candidate in Wales in 1918. Staton would enter Parliament firstly in one of the seats in Merthyr Tydfil as an Independent Labour MP following the 1915 Merthyr Tydfil by-election after the death of Hardie. Hartshorn would also be a successful Labour candidate in 1918 in Wales. In addition, John Henry Williams, who was unsuccessful in East Carmarthenshire, standing as an Independent Labour candidate, would eventually be elected as an official Labour candidate in 1922 in Wales.

== Results ==
Party	Seats					Aggregate votes		
Party	Total	Gains	Losses	Net	Of total (%)	Total	Of total (%) (Note: Adjusted for multi-member constituencies.)	Change (%)
Liberal	26 (Note: Includes Liberal-Labour MP Clement Edwards in East Glamorganshire.)	1	2	▼1	76.5	117,533	47.9	▼4.4
Conservative-Liberal Unionist	3	1	2	▲1	8.8	81,100	33.8	▲1.9
Conservative	3	1	2	▲1	8.8	75,823	32.7	▲1.3
Liberal Unionist	0	0	0	Steady	—	5,277	1.1	▲0.6
Labour	5	0	0	Steady	14.7	47,027	17.8	▲2.9
Independent Labour	0	0	0	Steady	—	1,176	0.5	▲0.1
Total	34			0	100.0	246,836	100.0	0.0
Registered voters, and turnout						302,321 (Note: Electorate in contested constituencies. The total electorate was 425,744.)	84.9	▼6.6

=== Popular vote ===
Popular vote
Liberal	47.9%
Conservative	32.7%
Labour	17.8%
Liberal Unionist	1.1%
Ind. Labour	0.5%

Popular vote (alliances)
Liberal	47.9%
Con-LU	33.8%
Labour	17.8%
Ind. Labour	0.5%

=== Parliament seats ===
Parliament seats
Liberal	76.5%
Labour	14.7%
Conservative	8.8%

Parliament seats (alliances)
Liberal	76.5%
Labour	14.7%
Con-LU	8.8%

== See also ==
- December 1910 United Kingdom general election in England
- December 1910 United Kingdom general election in Ireland
- December 1910 United Kingdom general election in Scotland
- List of United Kingdom Parliament constituencies (1885–1918) by region
- List of MPs for constituencies in Wales (December 1910-1918)
