= December 1910 United Kingdom general election =

- 3–19 December 1910

All 670 seats in the House of Commons 336 seats needed for a majority
- Registered: 7,709,981
- Turnout: 5,235,238; 81.6% (▼5.2 pp)
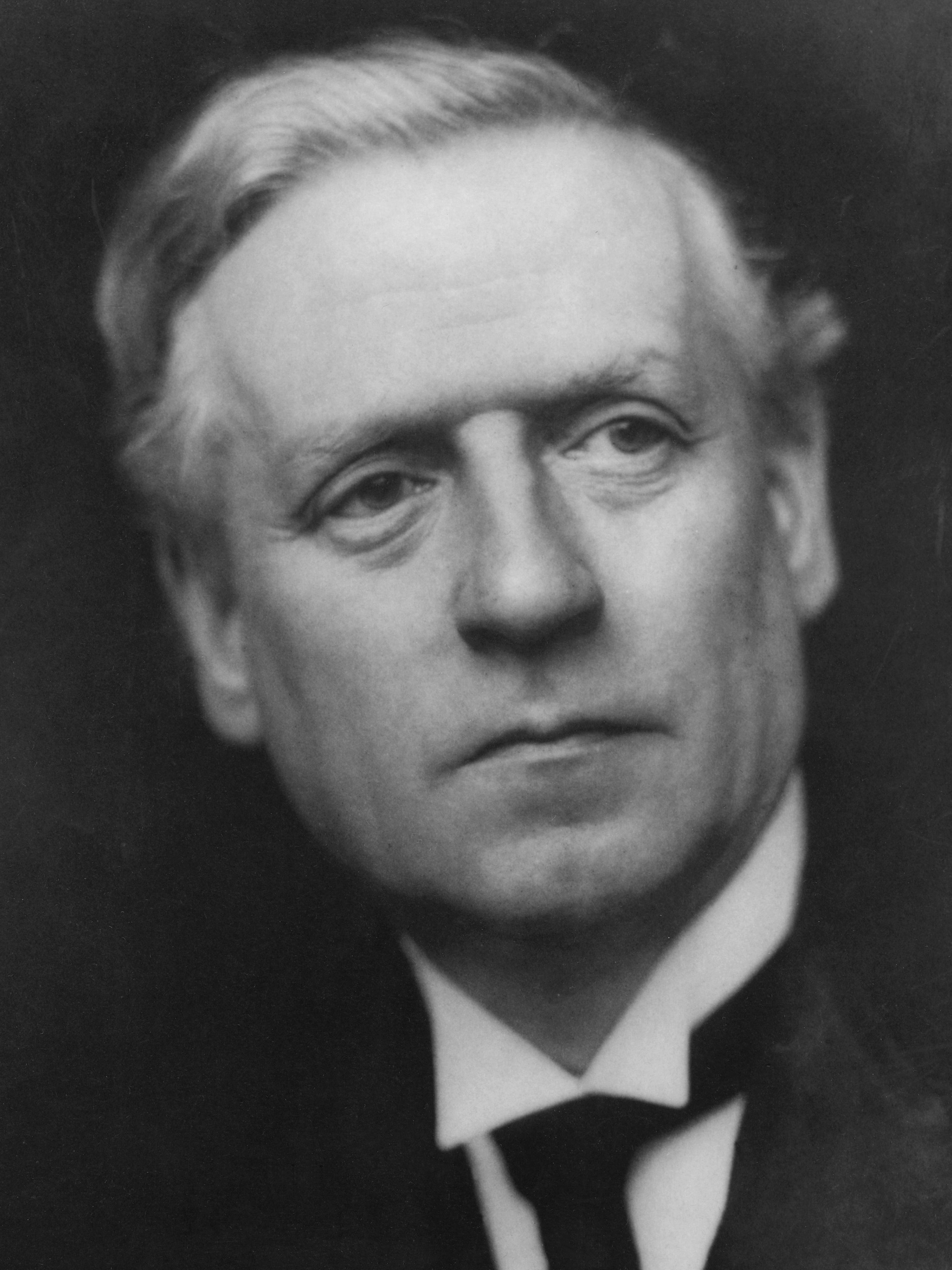

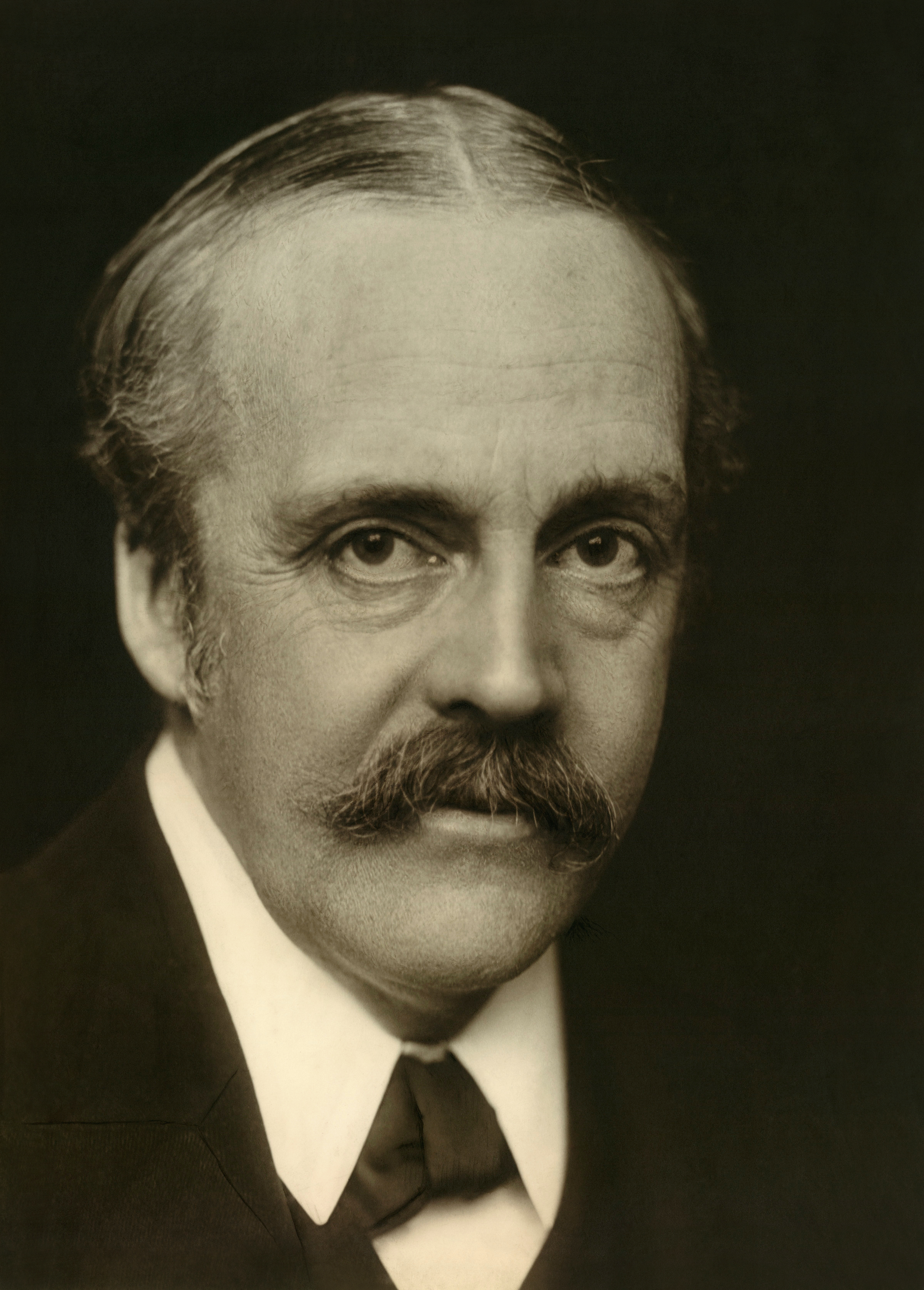

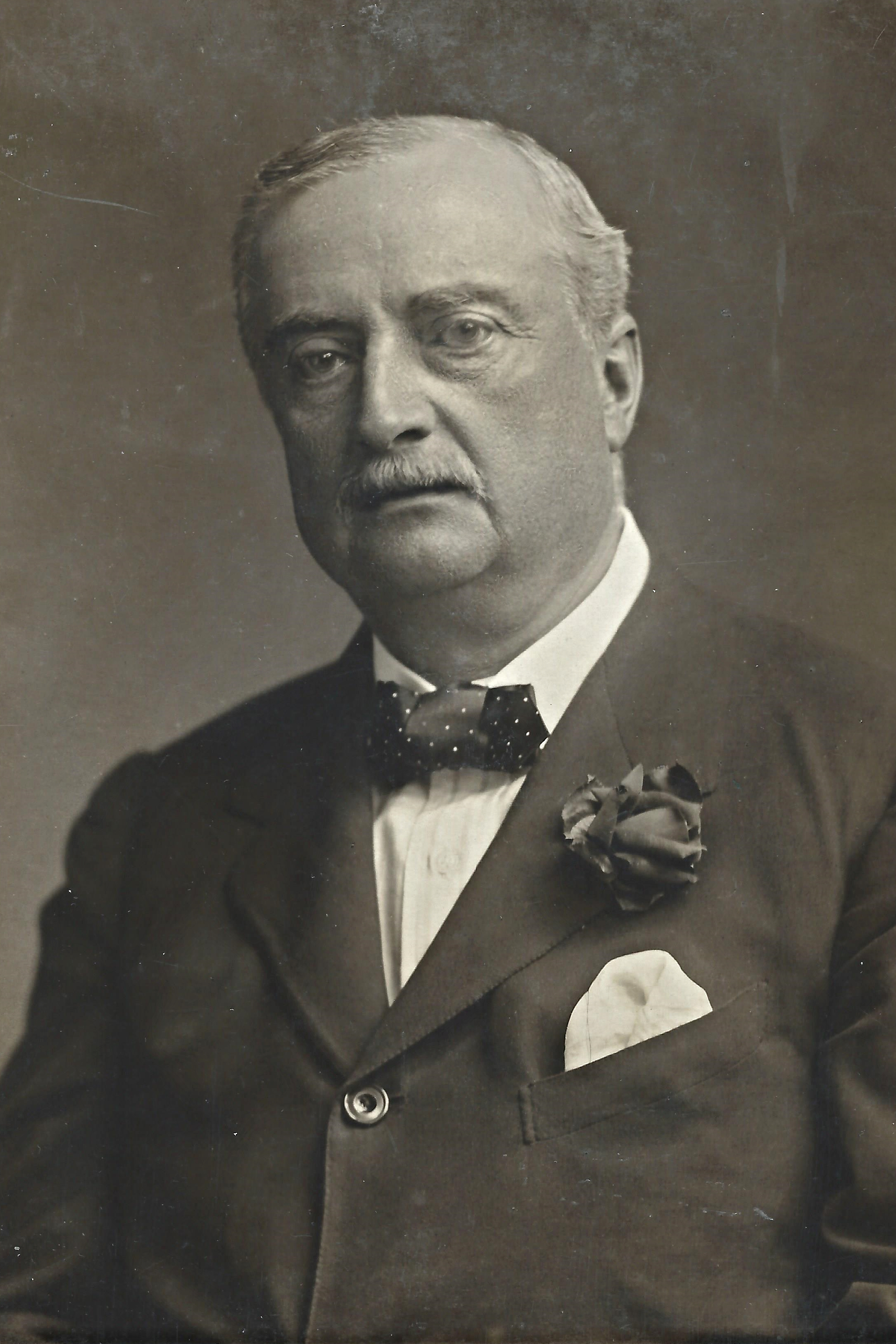

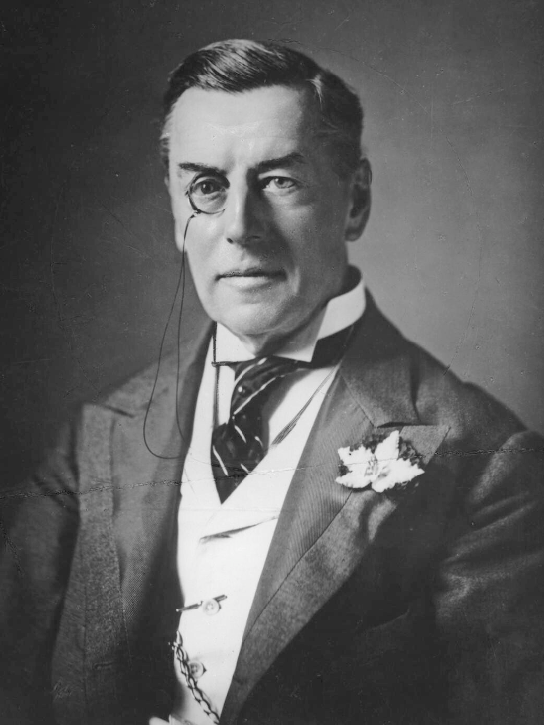

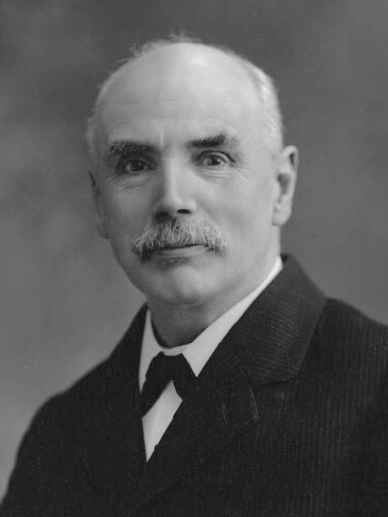

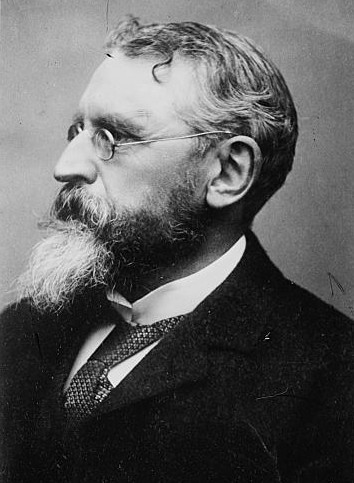
	First party	Second party	Third party
Leader	H. H. Asquith	Arthur Balfour	John Redmond
Party	Liberal	Conservative	Irish Parliamentary
Alliance		Conservative-Liberal Unionist
Leader since	30 April 1908	11 June 1902	6 February 1900
Leader's seat	East Fife	City of London	Waterford City
Last election	274 seats, 43.5%	229 seats, 39.4%	71 seats, 1.2%
Seats won	271	223 (Note: Figure includes Speaker of the House of Commons James Lowther in Penrith.)	74
Seat change	▼3	▼6	▲3
Popular vote	2,293,869	2,121,563	95,160
Percentage	44.2%	40.9%	1.9%
Swing	▲0.7 pp	▲1.5 pp	▲0.7 pp
	Fourth party	Fifth party	Sixth party
Leader	Joseph Chamberlain	George Barnes	William O'Brien
Party	Liberal Unionist	Labour	All-for-Ireland
Alliance	Conservative-Liberal Unionist
Leader since	1903	14 February 1910	March 1909
Leader's seat	Birmingham West	Glasgow Blackfriars and Hutchesontown	North East Cork
Last election	43 seats, 7.4%	40 seats, 7.0%	8 seats, 0.4%
Seats won	49	42	8
Seat change	▲6	▲2	Steady
Popular vote	298,606	371,802	35,649
Percentage	5.7%	6.4%	0.6
Swing	▼1.7 pp	▼0.6 pp	▲0.2 pp
- Colours denote the winning party

- Composition of the House of Commons after the election.
Prime Minister before election
H. H. Asquith
Liberal
Prime Minister after election
H. H. Asquith
Liberal

The December 1910 United Kingdom general election was held from 3 to 19 December. It was the last general election to be held over several days and the last to be held before the First World War.

The election took place following the efforts of the Liberal government to pass its People's Budget in 1909, which raised taxes on the wealthy to fund social welfare programmes. The 1909 budget was only agreed to by the House of Lords in April 1910 after the January general election in which the Liberals and the Irish Parliamentary Party gained a majority. The Government called a further election in December 1910 to get a mandate for the Parliament Act 1911, which would prevent the House of Lords from permanently blocking legislation linked to money bills ever again, and to obtain King George V's agreement to threaten to create sufficient Liberal peers to pass that act (in the event this did not prove necessary, as the Lords voted to curtail their own powers).

The Conservative Party, led by Arthur Balfour with their Liberal Unionist allies, and the Liberal Party, led by Prime Minister H. H. Asquith, almost exactly repeated the numerical result produced in the January election, with the Conservatives again winning the largest number of votes. The Liberal Party under Asquith remained in government with the support of the Irish Parliamentary Party. This was the last election in which the Liberals won the highest number of seats in the House of Commons. It was also the last United Kingdom general election in which a party other than Labour or the Conservatives won the most seats.

== Electoral system ==
Most of the MPs were elected through first-past-the-post voting in single-member districts. Conversely, 54 MPs were elected in two-seat districts by the use of plurality block voting, where each voter could cast up to two votes.

== Candidates ==
Below is a table summarising the candidates of the December 1910 general election.

Affiliation	Candidates
Liberal Party	467 (Note: Includes 17 Liberal-Labour candidates.)
Conservative Party	448
Irish Parliamentary Party	81
Liberal Unionist Party	75
Labour Party	56
Irish Unionist Party	25
All-for-Ireland League	21
Independent Nationalist	4
Independent Labour	4 (Note: The candidates that stood were Charles Nathaniel Lowe Shaw in Battersea, Thomas Frederick Richards in East Northamptonshire, Victor Grayson in Kennington and John Henry Williams in East Carmarthenshire.)
Social Democratic Federation	2 (Note: The candidates that stood were Leader Henry Hyndman in Burnley and Dan Irving in Rochdale.)
Independent Unionist	2 (Note: The candidates that stood were Thomas Sloan stood in Belfast South and James Leslie Wanklyn in Galway Borough.)
Independent Conservative	2 (Note: The candidates that stood were Francis Bennett-Goldney in Canterbury and Archibald Macleod in Caithness.)
Independent Liberal	1 (Note: Candidate Richard Roberts stood in Hackney South.)
Suffragist	1 (Note: Candidate Herbert Jacobs stood in St Pancras East.)
Scottish Prohibition Party	1 (Note: Candidate Edwin Scrymgeour stood in Dundee.)
Women's Suffrage	1 (Note: Candidate William Julius Mirrlees stood in Glasgow Camlachie.)
Total	1,191

== Analysis of outcome ==
=== Liberal Party ===
The Liberal Party under the leadership of H. H. Asquith took 44.2% of the vote, which was a slight increase of 0.7%.

In England, the Liberal Party lost 16 seats to the Conservative Party, but also gained 16 seats from the Conservatives. Outside of this, it gained Cricklade, Manchester South West and Cheltenham from the Liberal Unionists and gained one seat in Sunderland, but lost Bodmin, Tavistock, Torquay, Great Grimsby, Darlington and Ashburton to the Liberal Unionists.

In Wales, the Liberals won Radnorshire from the Conservatives, but lost Montgomery and Cardiff to the Conservatives. In Scotland, it won Kirkcudbright and Glasgow Tradeston, but lost St Andrews Burghs to the Liberal Unionists, and West Fife to Labour. It held its one seat of North Tyrone in Ireland.

Several Liberal Labour candidates won or held seats at this election with, and giving support to, the Liberal Party. These were Dartford, Battersea, St Pancras East, Stoke-upon-Trent, Salford North, Mid Durham, Morpeth and Wansbeck in England. In Wales, Clement Edwards won East Glamorganshire. As such, the party saw a net decrease of just 3 seats. The Liberals took 271 seats, within which 9 were held by Liberal-Labour MPs.

=== Conservative Party ===
The Conservative Party took around 40.9%, an increase 1.5% in vote share when compared with the previous election. It took 223 seats itself. Between it and its ally, the Liberal Unionist Party, the alliance of the parties took 46.6% of the vote, and 234 seats. Overall, the Conservative Party lost a net of 6 seats.

Between it and the Liberal Party, there were several seat transfers in England, but with overall very little change in terms of seats for the Conservatives. It gained Islington North, St Pancras West, King's Lynn, Dudley, High Peak, Melton, Eskdale, Ashton-under-Lyne, Darwen, Liverpool Exchange, Salford South, Warrington, Altrincham and Birkenhead from the Liberal Party. It also gained both seats in Plymouth from the Liberals. However, it lost Banbury, Dartford, Rochester, Peckham, Southwark West, Stepney, Bedford, Newmarket, Lowestoft, Saffron Walden, Leek, Coventry, Louth, Lincolnshire, Cockermouth, Burnley and Wakefield to the Liberal Party. As such, between the Liberals and Conservatives, there were 16 losses and 16 gains for the Conservatives.

Outside of this, it gained St Helens and Wigan from the Labour Party. But, it lost Bow and Bromley, Woolwich, Whitehaven to Labour, as well as one of the two seats in Sunderland. Additionally, it lost Canterbury to Independent Conservative Francis Bennett-Goldney and lost Lewes in exchange with the Liberal Unionists.

In Wales, the Conservatives lost Radnorshire to the Liberals, but won Montgomery and Cardiff from them. In Scotland, it lost Kirkcudbright and Glasgow Tradeston to the Liberal Party. Under the Whip of the Conservative Party, the Irish Unionist Party under the leadership of Vicount Midleton held the vast majority of seats in Ulster, but lost Mid Tyrone and South Dublin to the Irish Parliamentary Party.

=== Liberal Unionist Party ===
The Liberal Unionist Party, led by Joseph Chamberlain saw a 1.7% decrease in vote to around 5.7% of the vote, but an overall gain of 6 seats. In England, the party retained Totnes, East Somerset, Aylesbury, one of the two seats in Portsmouth, Mile End, Westminster St George's, Hannover Square, St Pancras South, Mid Norfolk, Ludlow, Burton, Handsworth, West Staffordshire, Ross, Droitwich, East Worcestershire, West Derbyshire and Durham. It also retained its university constituency seats in London University and Oxford University. It held its metropolitan Birmingham seats of Birmingham Bordesley, Birmingham Central, Birmingham North, Birmingham South and Birmingham West. Of some dispute, however, is some distinction between whether the party had held some other seats, due to several originally being classed as Conservatives holds. Subsequent research had instead re-classed the following seats as Liberal Unionist holds: Maldon, Hitchin, Watford, North Lonsdale, Chertsey, Guildford, Paddington North, Cambridge, Penryn and Falmouth and Walsall.

In Scotland, it held the university constituency of Edinburgh and St Andrews Universities, as well as the county and burgh seats of Glasgow Camlachie and Edinburgh West, while it held North Antrim, South Londonderry and South Tyrone Ireland, but remained without representation in Wales.

The Party gained Bodmin, Tavistock, Torquay, Great Grimsby and Darlington from the Liberals. Of some dispute, as candidates were originally classed as Conservatives, is some gains. Liberal Unionist likely also gained Ashburton from the Liberals, and Newton from Labour. It also gained Lewes from the Conservative Party, with sitting MP William Campion retaining the seat in the 1910 Lewes by-election, with the Conservatives not standing against its allied party. In Scotland, it gained St Andrews Burghs from the Liberals.

However, it lost Cricklade and Manchester South West to the Liberal Party. Where the party may have taken the seat of Cheltenham instead of the Conservatives at the previous election, it also lost the seat to the Liberal Party. With 9 gains and 3 losses overall, the party took 49 seats at this election.

Its 6 gains off-set the 6 losses the Conservative suffered, with the alliance between the parties seeing its raw seat count remain unchanged.

This was the last general election in which the Liberal Unionist would stand, owing to the party officially merging with its long-time ally, to form the modern Conservative and Unionist Party in 1912.

=== Labour Party ===
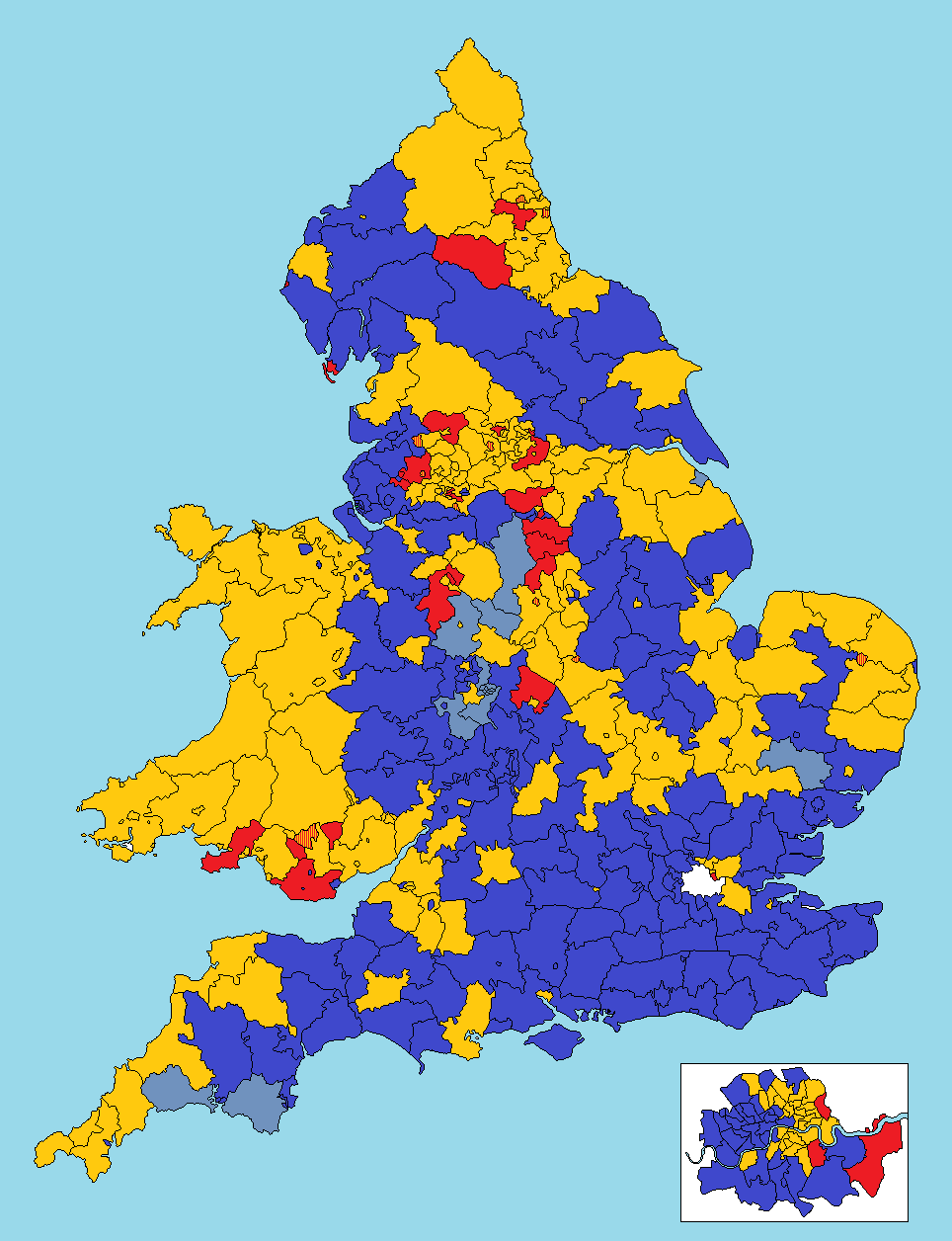
England and Wales seat winners

The Labour Party, under the very short-term leadership of George Barnes, took 6.4% of the vote, a decrease of 0.6% of the vote with the party standing significantly fewer seats than in the previous election. It retained its seats of Deptford, West Ham South, Hanley, North West Staffordshire, Nuneaton, Chesterfield, Mid Derbyshire, North East Derbyshire, Barrow and Furness, Clitheroe, Gorton, Ince, Manchester East, Manchester North East, Westhoughton, Barnard Castle, Chester-le-Street, Bradford West, Hallamshire, Leeds East, Normanton and Sheffield Attercliffe. It also held one of the two seats in Norwich, Derby, Leicester, Blackburn, Bolton, Stockport, Newcastle-upon-Tyne and Halifax. In Wales, it held Rhondda, South Glamorganshire, West Monmouthshire and Gower, while in Scotland Leader George Barnes held Glasgow Blackfriars and Hutchesontown.

Labour gained Bow and Bromley, Woolwich, Whitehaven from the Conservatives. It also gained one of the two seats in Sunderland. However, it lost Newton to the Liberal Unionist Party, and St Helens and Wigan to the Conservatives. It saw not change in Wales and Ireland, but gained West Fife in Scotland.

With 5 gains and 3 losses, the party increased its representation to 42 seats.

=== Irish Nationalists ===
The combined parties of All-for-Ireland League under William O'Brien and Irish Parliamentary Party under John Redmond as well as Independent Nationalists held 83 seats. In addition, in England, long-time Nationalist MP T. P. O'Connor held his seat of Liverpool Scotland, with O'Connor also being a member of the Irish Parliamentary Party. As such, the count was 84 National seats.

The Independent Nationalist held South Monaghan and North Westmeath. The Nationalist All-for-Ireland League, lost two seats in Counties Louth and Mayo ––being South Mayo and North Louth–– but gained two in County Cork, effectively isolating it to that county. All-for-Ireland therefore held 8 seats. These were its two seats in Cork City, with the party already holding the other of the two seats, along with Mid Cork, North Cork, North East Cork, South East Cork and West Cork. It also gained South Cork from the IPP.

== Results ==
The following tables are based on the collations of seats and votes collected by F. W. S. Craig for the results in Great Britain, and seats and votes collected by Brian Mercer Walker for Ireland. The distinctions made between the Conservatives, Irish Unionists and Liberal Unionists in alterations to these works are set out according to Wesley Ferris.

=== Summary of seats returned ===
Party	Leader	MPs		Aggregate votes	
Party	Leader		Of total		Of total (Note: Adjusted for multi-member constituencies.)
Conservative-Liberal Unionist	Arthur Balfour	272	40.6%	2,420,169	46.6%
Conservative Party	Arthur Balfour	207	30.9%	2,374,125	40.0%
Liberal Unionist Party	Joseph Chamberlain	49	7.3%	298,606	5.7%
Irish Unionist Party (Note: Stood under the Conservative Party Whip; all figures are attributed to the Conservative Party nationally.)	Vicount Midleton	16	2.4%	46,044	0.9%
Liberal Party	H. H. Asquith	271 (Note: Includes 9 Liberal-Labour MPs.)	40.4%	2,293,869	44.2%
Irish Parliamentary Party	John Redmond	74 (Note: Includes T. P. O'Connor in Liverpool Scotland.)	11.0%	95,160	1.9%
Labour Party	George Barnes	42	6.3%	371,802	6.4%
All-for-Ireland League	William O'Brien	8	1.2%	35,649	0.6%
Independent Nationalist	—N/a	2	0.3%	911	0.0%
Independent Conservative	—N/a	1	0.1%	1,722	0.0%

=== Full results ===

UK General Election December 1910
		Candidates						Votes		
Party	Leader	Stood	Elected	Gained	Unseated	Net	% of total	%	No.	Net %
Conservative and Liberal Unionist	Arthur Balfour	548	272			Steady	40.6	46.6	2,270,753	−0.3
Liberal	H. H. Asquith	467	271			−3	40.4	44.2	2,157,256	+0.7
Labour	George Barnes	56	42	5	3	+2	6.3	6.4	309,963	−0.6
Irish Parliamentary	John Redmond	81	74	5	2	+3	11.0	1.9	90,416	+0.7
All-for-Ireland	William O'Brien	21	8	2	2	0	1.2	0.6	30,322	+0.2
Social Democratic Federation	H. M. Hyndman	2	0	0	0	0		0.1	5,733	−0.1
Ind. Conservative	N/A	4	1	1	1	0	0.1	0.1	4,647	
Independent Labour	N/A	4	0	0	0	0		0.1	3,492	
Independent Liberal	N/A	1	0	0	1	−1		0.0	1,946	
Scottish Prohibition	Edwin Scrymgeour	1	0	0	0	0		0.0	913	
Ind. Nationalist	N/A	4	2	0	1	−1	0.3	0.0	911	
Independent	N/A	2	0	0	0	0		0.0	57	

=== Popular vote ===
Popular vote
Liberal	44.2%
Conservative	40.9%
Labour	6.4%
Liberal Unionist	5.7%
Irish Parliamentary	1.9%
All-for-Ireland	0.6%
Others	0.3%

Popular vote (alliances)
Con-LU	46.6%
Liberal	44.2%
Labour	6.4%
Irish Parliamentary	1.9%
All-for-Ireland	0.6%
Others	0.3%

=== Parliament seats ===
Parliamentary seats
Liberal	40.4%
Conservative	33.3%
Irish Parliamentary	11.0%
Liberal Unionist	6.4%
Labour	6.3%
All-for-Ireland	1.2%
Ind. Nationalist	0.3%
Ind. Conservative	0.1%

Popular vote (alliances)
Con-LU	40.6%
Liberal	40.4%
Irish Parliamentary	11.0%
Labour	6.3%
All-for-Ireland	1.2%
Ind. Nationalist	0.3%
Ind. Conservative	0.1%

== Aftermath ==
The Liberals won 271 seats and the Conservatives and the Liberal Unionists won 272 seats, however the Liberals remained the largest party due to the Speaker having been Conservative, meaning they sat with 271 MPs.

The Liberals, still lacking a parliamentary majority, again went into coalition with the Irish Parliamentary Party, who insisted on a Home Rule Bill as a condition of coalition.

== See also ==
- December 1910 United Kingdom general election in England
- December 1910 United Kingdom general election in Ireland
- December 1910 United Kingdom general election in Scotland
- December 1910 United Kingdom general election in Wales
- List of United Kingdom Parliament constituencies (1885–1918) by region
- List of MPs elected in the December 1910 United Kingdom general election
- Parliamentary franchise in the United Kingdom 1885–1918
