= Thomas Gibb =

Thomas Eccleston Gibb (1838 – 6 June 1894) was an English Liberal politician who sat in the House of Commons from 1885 to 1886.

Gibb was born at Liverpool. He was clerk of Guardians and Vestry Clerk of St. Pancras.

In the 1885 general election, Gibb was elected Member of Parliament for St Pancras East but lost the seat in the 1886 general election.

Gibb lived at Bushey, Hertfordshire, and died at the age of 55

Gibb married Mary Humphrey of Shoreditch.

Parliament of the United Kingdom
New constituency	Member of Parliament for St Pancras East; 1885 – 1886	Succeeded by Robert Grant Webster
