= Hugh Lea =

British politician

Hugh Cecil Lea

Hugh Cecil Lea (27 May 1869 – 29 January 1926) was a British Liberal Party politician and newspaper proprietor.

== Background ==
He was a son of Carl Adolph Lea, a London coal merchant registered as owning a Merchant navy ship, the spritsail-rigged "Alacer", in 1875, his business failing the same year, and Elizabeth Maria (c. 1842-1931), daughter of Thomas Matthews. He was educated in Boulogne, Reims and Munich.

== Career ==
=== Business ===
Lea was on the London staff of The African Review. He owned The Wine and Spirit Trade Record.

=== Politics ===
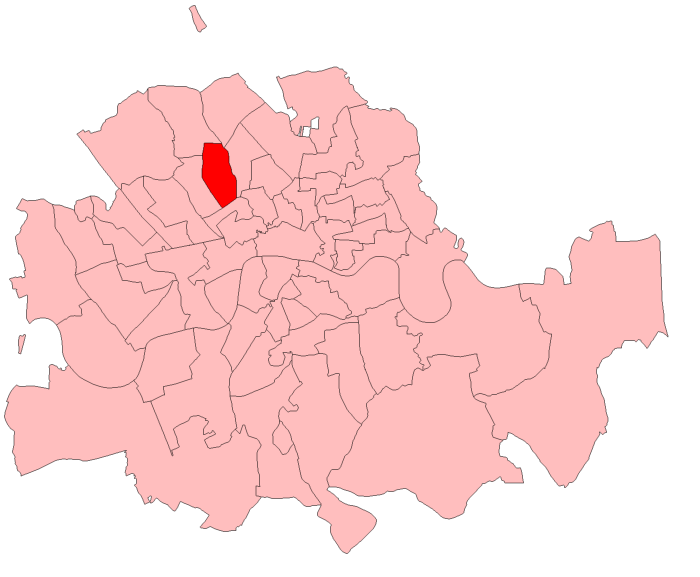
St Pancras East in London County, showing boundaries 1885–1918

Lea was Liberal MP for St Pancras East from 1906 to 1910. Standing for parliament for the first time, he gained the seat from the Conservative at the 1906 General Election. He only served one parliamentary term before standing down at the general election of January 1910. He did not stand for parliament again. He was a Member of London County Council, representing St Pancras East for the Liberal Party backed Progressives from 1910 to 1913.

=== Military endeavours ===
Lea was an advocate for a greater mix of social classes in the military officer class, having come from a background which necessitated starting off his military endeavours in the ranks. Lea enlisted in the Oxfordshire and Buckinghamshire Light Infantry in 1887; he "excelled in his exams, progressing through his education certificates" and was appointed a staff clerk in the Army Pay Department, paying £18 as a lance corporal for his own discharge. He went to the United States, and was commissioned in the Illinois National Guard of the United States Army.

He was commissioned a temporary Infantry second-lieutenant in 1915, serving in the Rifle Brigade until relinquishing his commission due to ill health the following year; in 1919, he was serving with the 2nd Volunteer Battalion of the Leicestershire Regiment, relinquishing his commission as a temporary lieutenant and being granted the honorary rank of lieutenant.

Lea's experiences with non-commissioned officers led him to advocate for John Dimmer's commission, Dimmer being from a "decidedly working-class" background and lacking the financial security to allow him to take a position as an officer, being considered "professionally but not socially fit, for a commission" by the commanding officer of the 4th Battalion, King's Royal Rifle Corps. Dimmer would become a Lieutenant-colonel, and was awarded the Victoria Cross and Military Cross.

== Personal life ==
In 1896, Lea married Jessie, daughter of Charles Fish. They lived at 60, Cadogan Place, London S.W.

Lea's grave in Hampstead Cemetery

Lea died after a short illness at the age of 56. He is buried in Hampstead Cemetery.

== Sources ==
- Craig, F. W. S. (1989). British parliamentary election results 1885–1918. Politico's Publishing. ISBN 978-0900178276.
- Johnson, Matthew (2013). Militarism and the British Left, 1902–1914. London: Palgrave Macmillan. ISBN 978-1137274120.
- Who Was Who. Vol. I, 1897–1915. London: A & C Black. 1998. ISBN 978-0713626704.

Parliament of the United Kingdom
| Preceded by Sir Thomas Wrightson | Member of Parliament for St Pancras East; 1906 – January 1910 | Succeeded by Joseph Martin |
