= Thomas Whitwell =

British engineer and inventor

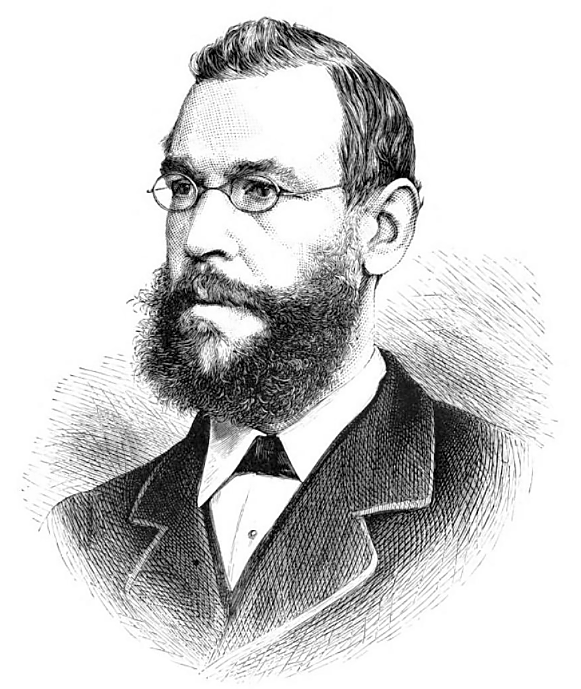
- Engineer, Metallurgist and inventor
- Born: 24 October 1837; Kendal, Westmorland, England
- Died: 5 August 1878 (aged 40); Thornaby-on-Tees, North Riding of Yorkshire, England

Thomas Whitwell (24 October 1837 – 5 August 1878) was a British engineer, inventor and metallurgist. Known as Tom, he was the third son of William and Sarah Whitwell of Kendal. Tom was initially educated at home via private tutors he was sent to the Quaker run York School at 10 years old. In 1858, at 16, he travelled with his elder brother William to Darlington. As apprentice to Alfred Kitching in his locomotive building shop he learned engineering and metallurgy. From there he continued to build his skills, working with Robert Stephenson & Co in Newcastle.

In 1859 he and William started iron-smelting at Thornaby. Iron ore had been discovered in the area four years previously. The brothers designed and built large scale hot blast fire brick stoves that were much larger and more efficient that anything built in the area until that point. By 1873 the three re-built blast furnaces were 80 feet high and 22 feet in diameter and the works had over 750 employees.

In 1878 Tom died due to an accident at his works. A steam explosion caught him and his foreman John Thompson whilst they were investigating a problem with the rolling mill furnace.

The works continued to run under family ownership, under the chairmanship of Tom's nephew William Fry Whitwell until 1922 when they were eventually closed due to a global glut of pig iron.

== Key inventions ==
Tom filed at least five patents in the UK and two in the US. He invented and patented the technology used at Thornaby as the Whitwell Heating Stove. Over two hundred stoves were installed in over 70 furnaces around the globe. He also patented a continuous brick-burning kiln and a more efficient fire grate.

== US Influence ==
The City of Whitwell in Tennessee is named in his honour. Tom was a founder and Chairman of the Southern States Coal, Iron and Land Company which developed coal mining in Whitwell and Iron smelting in nearby South Pittsburg. Tom visited the area at least twice hosting a banquet for five hundred workers and guests of ‘all classes’. After his death, the company was acquired by the Tennessee Coal and Iron Company.

== Influence at home ==
Throughout his life, Tom was a committed Christian and contributed to wider society, helping to form over thirty Young Men's Christian Associations across the North of England. He was also Captain of his local Fire Brigade. One of his lasting legacies is the Cleveland Institution of Engineers. The Institution is one of the oldest such engineering bodies in the world. Tom hosted the inaugural meeting at his home on Church Road in Stockton and was the first secretary of the organisation. There were 12 members at that first meeting, but by the time of his death (when he was president) the ranks had grown to over 460.

=== Death and Funeral ===
Thousands of residents assembled to pay respects to Tom at his funeral filling the south end of Stockton High Street and the entire length of Bridge Road. His funeral procession, was four deep and numbered about two thousand people – an unusual turnout for a 40 year old industrialist and engineer.
