= Thomas Wrightson =

British politician

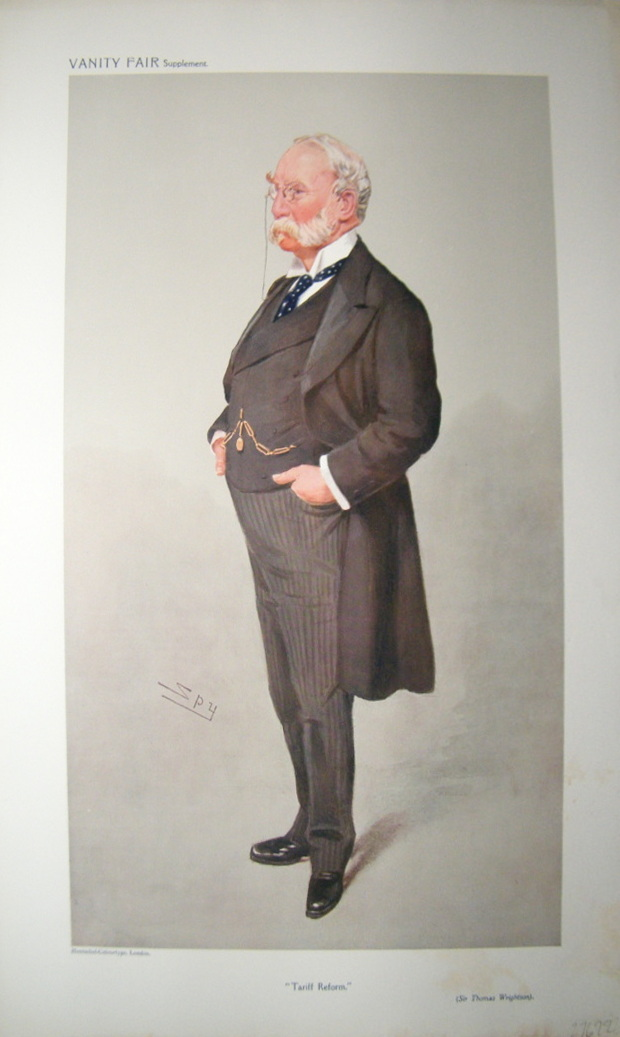
"Tariff Reform", caricature by Spy in Vanity Fair, 1908.

Sir Thomas Wrightson, 1st Baronet, DL (31 March 1839 – 18 June 1921) was a British Conservative politician.

Wrightson sat as Member of Parliament (MP) for Stockton between 1892 and 1895 and for St Pancras East between 1899 and 1906. In 1900 he was created a baronet, of Neasham Hall in the County of Durham, and was appointed a Deputy Lieutenant of Durham on 4 December 1900. He died in June 1921, aged 82.

He was the brother of John Wrightson, the founder of Downton Agricultural College.

Coat of arms of Thomas Wrightson

Crest
In front of a saltire Gules a unicorn salient Or.
Escutcheon
Or a fess invected chequy Azure and Argent between two eagles' heads erased in chief Sable and a saltire couped in base Gules.
Motto
Veritas Omnia Vincit

Parliament of the United Kingdom
Preceded by Sir Horace Davey	Member of Parliament for Stockton; 1892–1895	Succeeded by Jonathan Samuel
Preceded by Robert Grant Webster	Member of Parliament for St Pancras East; 1899–1906	Succeeded by Hugh Lea
Baronetage of the United Kingdom
New title	Baronet (of Neasham Hall); 1900–1921	Succeeded by Thomas Garmondsway Wrightson
Professional and academic associations
Preceded by Jeremiah Head	President of the Cleveland Institution of Engineers; 1874–1876	Succeeded by Thomas Whitwell
