= Jeremiah Head =

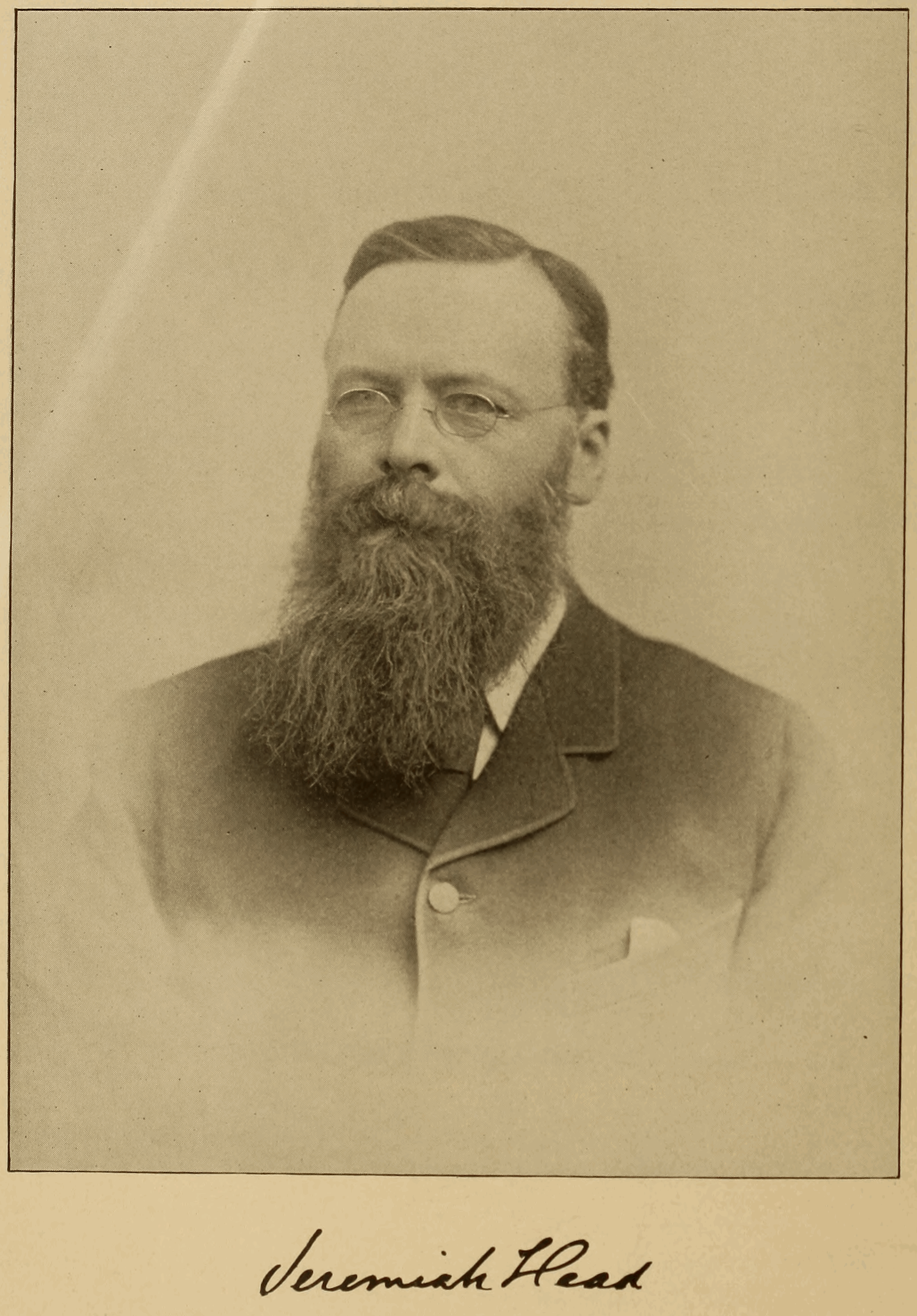
This photo of Jeremiah Head (and an article about him) appeared in Cassier's Magazine, November 1895.

Jeremiah Head (11 July 1835 Ipswich – 10 March 1899 Hastings) was a British mechanical engineer.

He was apprenticed in 1852 at the works of Robert Stephenson and Co, Newcastle upon Tyne. He was manager of the Steam Plough Works of John Fowler and Co in Leeds, where he invented a means of signalling by lamps to facilitate steam-ploughing at night.

From 1868 to 1885, he worked, with Theodore Fox, the firm of Fox, Head and Co, and erected the Newport Rolling Mills, Middlesbrough, for the manufacture of iron plates. He introduced a plan of profit-sharing with his workmen; no labour disputes arose. In 1864, he also founded the Cleveland Institution of Engineers. In 1888 he laid out the Bowesfield Iron Works at Stockton-on-Tees, and in 1891 the New British Iron Works at Corngreaves. He moved his practice to Westminster in 1894.

He was a member of the Institution of Civil Engineers.

== Family ==
He married Rebecca Ingram Wrightson, on 26 September 1860; they had children:

- Mary Ingram Head (16 October 1862 – 5 November 1904)
- William Howard Head (b. 28 September 1864
- Archibald Potter Head+ (b. 4 August 1866
- Alfred Wrightson Head (7 February 1868 – 30 May 1872)
- Rebecca Helen Gilchrist Head (11 June 1870 – 17 October 1889)
- Kathleen Campbell Head (b. 4 Jul 1872 -)
- Benjamin Wrightson Head (b. 12 May 1875 -)

Professional and academic associations
Preceded by W Barret	President of the Cleveland Institution of Engineers; 1871 - 1874	Succeeded by Thomas Wrightson
Preceded by Lowthian Bell	President of the Institution of Mechanical Engineers; 1885 - 1886	Succeeded by Edward Carbutt
