= Cleveland Institution of Engineers =

Regional engineering institution in England

- Abbreviation: CIE
- Formation: 1864
- Legal status: Non-profit organization
- Location: Middlesbrough
- Region served: Teesside
- Members: Academics and industrialists across the regional Science and Engineering sectors with a strong focus on Materials, Minerals and Mining
- President: Alan Scholes
- Main organ: CIE Council
- Affiliations: Institute of Materials, Minerals and Mining
- Website: CIE

The Cleveland Institution of Engineers (CIE) is a regional engineering institution in the Teesside region of England. It aims to serve the regional scientific and engineering community through a wide range of technical lectures and visits and by acting as the professional body for materials scientists and engineers. The CIE is one of the oldest institutions of its kind in the world and has been in continuous existence since it was founded in 1864. It is affiliated to the Institute of Materials, Minerals and Mining and a founder member of the Cleveland Scientific Institution

== A brief history of the Institution ==
The Cleveland Institution of Engineers is possibly the oldest Institution of its kind in the World. It was founded in 1864 by a small group of Engineering pioneers from the Steel and Railway Industries of the Cleveland area. The first meeting was held in the home of the first secretary, Thomas Whitwell, on 21 September 1864 and the motion was carried that:-

"A society be formed, the object of which shall be meeting together at regular intervals, of the Engineers of the Cleveland District for the furtherance of the Science of Engineering"

42 members of the Engineering community joined the Institution at the outset with a membership fee of one Guinea.

The Institution was instrumental in the industrial and academic growth of the area, and in helping to set up the then Constantine College which is now Teesside University. Throughout both World Wars and the Depression, the Institution continued to provide a regular programme of lectures and scientific excursions and to this day provides the Engineering and Scientific community and the general population of the Teesside area with a wide and varied free lecture programme on all aspects of science and engineering.

From 1864 until 1942 the proceedings of the institution's technical meetings were published. Copies of the complete series of proceedings and the institution's minute books until 2001 are kept at the Teesside Archives in Middlesbrough.

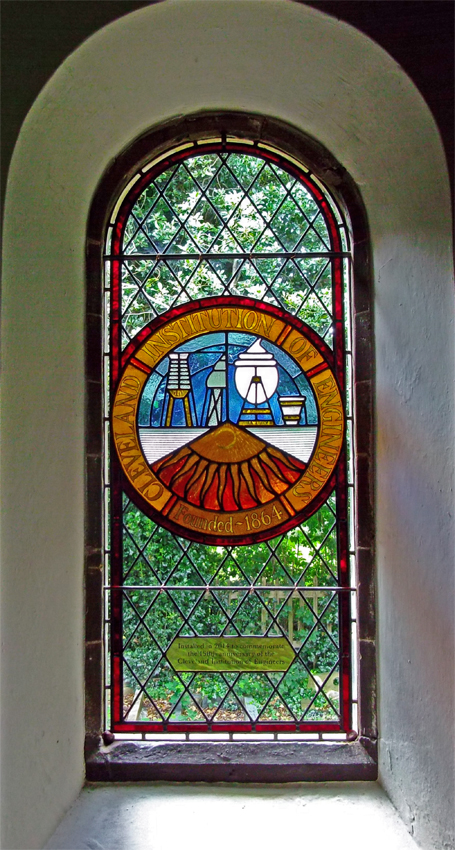
CIE commemorative window

In the 2013/2014 session the institution celebrated its 150th anniversary, with the main events taking place in the autumn of 2014. To mark the occasion a stained glass window with the institution's emblem was unveiled in St Cuthbert's Church in Marton, Middlesbrough during a dedication service on 23 November 2014, led by the Very Reverend Paul Ferguson, Bishop of Whitby. St Cuthbert's churchyard contains the vaults of the Bolckow and Vaughan families.

== Formation of The Cleveland Institution of Engineers ==
In the last half of the nineteenth century, industry in Cleveland developed at a rate never again repeated. In 1830 the Stockton-Darlington railway had been extended to Middlesbrough and the port established to ship coal. During the 1850s there grew an iron industry based on the easily accessible deposits of phosphoric ironstone in the Cleveland Hills, and a fledgling engineering industry stimulated by the demands of the burgeoning railway network and the ironworks themselves. The Durham coalfield was a source of excellent coking coals and the railway provided affordable bulk transport; there was easy access to the sea for export of products and the port was developed; construction of the South Gare began in 1863. Large scale production of steel from local ironstone via the Bessemer converter was made possible by development of the Thomas-Gilchrist process at Bolckow and Vaughan's works in Middlesbrough and Eston in 1878–79; and sufficient capital to finance developments was in the hands of a few men who were related by blood, marriage or religion. Conditions were thus ideal for the rapid growth of a thriving engineering industry supported by relatively cheap, locally produced iron and steel. Labour was attracted from all parts of the country and Middlesbrough grew rapidly, becoming a municipal borough in 1853, a parliamentary borough in 1867 and in 1888 a county borough.

It was in this period of rapid industrial development and municipal growth that the Cleveland Institution of Engineers was formed, on 15 September 1864, at a meeting of seven local industrialists at Thomas Whitwell's residence in Church Row, Stockton-on-Tees. The chief promoters of the Institution were Jeremiah Head, originally articled to Robert Stephenson in Newcastle; Thomas Wrightson who initially worked in W G Armstrong's works at Elswick; and Thomas Whitwell, who was first an apprentice in Alfred Kitching's Darlington locomotive works and then in Robert Stephenson's works in Newcastle.

"They had studied together and when they later found themselves working in the Cleveland district, they were anxious to draw to themselves kindred spirits to discuss engineering problems as they presented themselves for solution."

Thus began The Cleveland Institution of Engineers which since that time has been an important forum on Teesside for the presentation and discussion of industrial problems and developments.

The three chief promoters at the formation of the Institution each served as Secretary and Vice President in its early years and each one subsequently became President: Jeremiah Head from 1871 to 1874; Thomas Wrightson from 1874 to 1876; and Thomas Whitwell from 1876 to 1878. In August 1878 in the second year of his presidency Thomas Whitwell was accidentally killed by scalding steam at W Whitwell and Company's Thornaby Ironworks and a brilliant career was extinguished. Thomas Wrightson served as president for a second time in the 1914 session, the fiftieth anniversary of the Institution's founding.

Throughout most of the twentieth century the name Head Wrightson signified a major engineering manufacturer and contractor trading internationally and based on Teesside. Although, unlike his brothers Arthur and Howard, Jeremiah Head was not a direct partner in the Head Wrightson organisation, he had married Rebecca Ingram Wrightson, Thomas Wrightson's sister. By 1868 the principal partners in the enterprise were Arthur Head and Thomas Wrightson and Arthur Head was appointed chairman when the business became a limited liability company in 1888. On Arthur Head's retirement in 1909 Thomas Wrightson, then Sir Thomas, (in 1900 he had been created a baronet for his political services) became chairman and retained the position until his death in 1921. Some 50 years later Head Wrightson merged with the Davy Corporation which itself subsequently became part of Voest Alpine Industries, present today on Teesside as Primetals Technologies.

== Notable past presidents ==
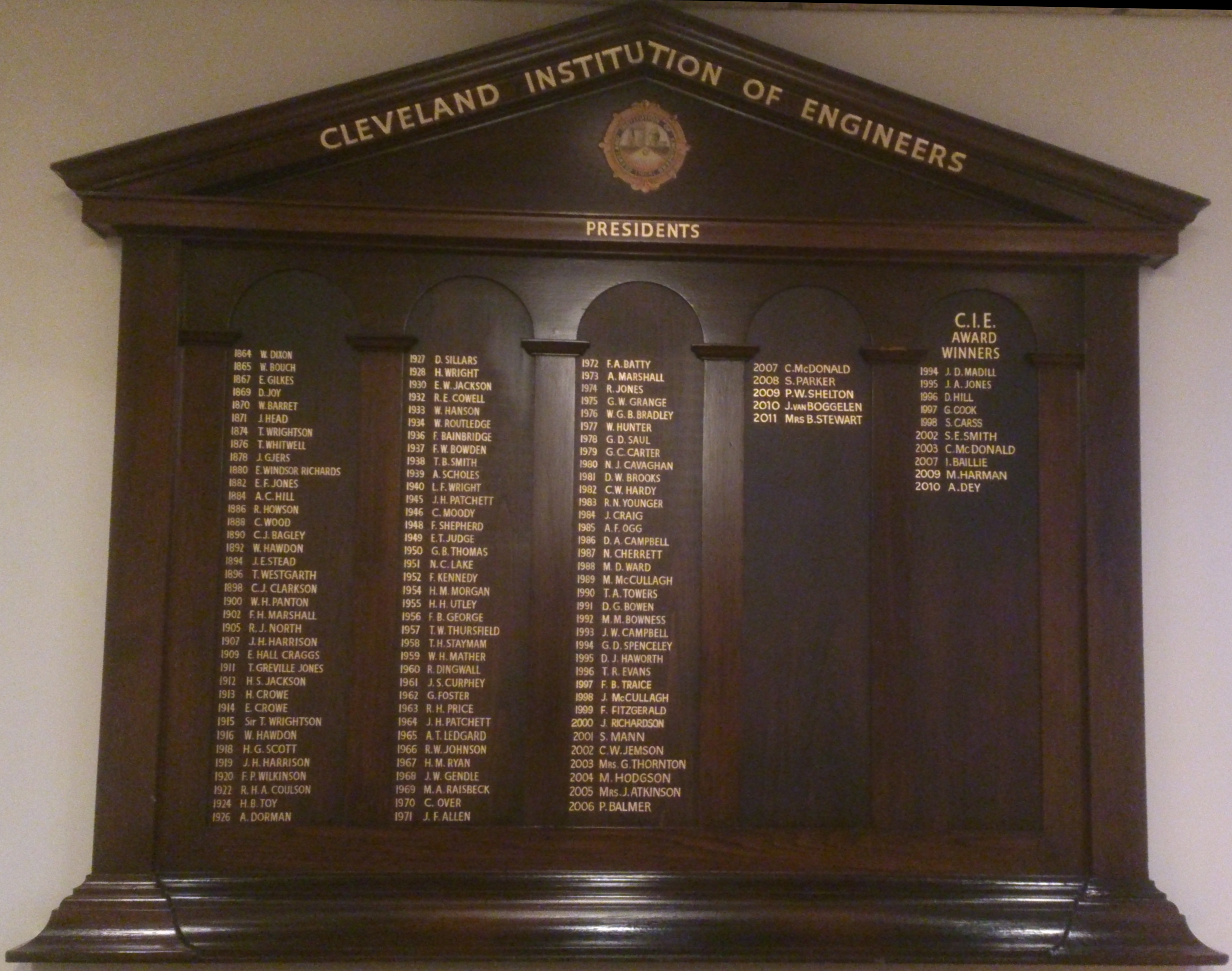
Presidents board of the Cleveland Institution of Engineers

Listed below are notable past presidents of the CIE. The names of all past presidents are displayed on the Presidents Board, which is housed at the Materials Processing Institute on Teesside.

Name	Organisation	Term
T Whitwell	William Whitwell and Co.	1876
A Dorman		1926
Sir T Wrightson		1915
T Wrightson		1874
J Head		1871
