= St Pancras East =

Parliamentary constituency in the United Kingdom, 1885–1918

- Former borough constituency for the House of Commons

1885–1918
- Seats: one
- Created from: Marylebone

St Pancras East was a parliamentary constituency in the St Pancras district of North London. It returned one Member of Parliament (MP) to the House of Commons of the Parliament of the United Kingdom.

== History ==
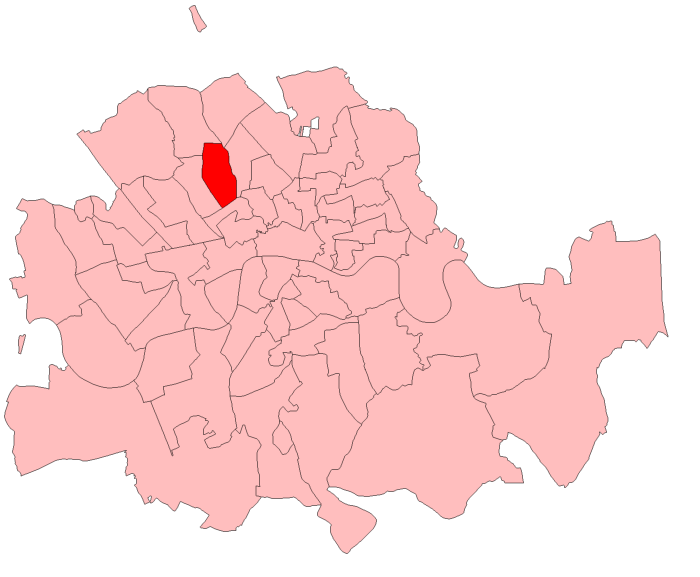
St Pancras East in London, 1885-1918

The constituency was created by the Redistribution of Seats Act 1885 for the 1885 general election, and abolished for the 1918 general election.

== Members of Parliament ==
Election	Member	Party
1885	Thomas Gibb	Liberal
1886	Robert Webster	Conservative
1899	Sir Thomas Wrightson	Conservative
1906	Hugh Lea	Liberal
1910 (Jan)	Joseph Martin	Liberal
1918 change	Joseph Martin	Labour
1918	constituency abolished	

== Election results ==
=== Elections in the 1880s ===
General election 1885: St Pancras East
Party	Candidate	Votes	%	±%
Liberal	Thomas Gibb	2,416	52.7	
Conservative	Robert Grant Webster	2,170	47.3	
Majority		246	5.4	
Turnout		4,586	77.6	
Registered electors		5,913		
Liberal win (new seat)				

General election 1886: St Pancras East
Party	Candidate	Votes	%	±%
Conservative	Robert Grant Webster	2,327	56.0	+8.7
Liberal	Thomas Gibb	1,826	44.0	−8.7
Majority		501	12.0	N/A
Turnout		4,153	70.2	−7.4
Registered electors		5,913		
Conservative gain from Liberal		Swing	+8.7	

=== Elections in the 1890s ===
General election 1892: St Pancras East
Party	Candidate	Votes	%	±%
Conservative	Robert Grant Webster	2,621	54.6	−1.4
Liberal	Thomas Gibb	2,180	45.4	+1.4
Majority		441	9.2	−2.8
Turnout		4,801	72.8	+2.6
Registered electors		6,598		
Conservative hold		Swing	−1.4	

General election 1895: St Pancras East
Party	Candidate	Votes	%	±%
Conservative	Robert Grant Webster	2,612	52.9	−1.7
Liberal	Benjamin Francis Conn Costelloe	2,322	47.1	+1.7
Majority		290	5.8	−3.4
Turnout		4,934	70.6	−2.2
Registered electors		6,988		
Conservative hold		Swing	−1.7	

Webster resigned, causing a by-election.

1899 St Pancras East by-election
Party	Candidate	Votes	%	±%
Conservative	Thomas Wrightson	2,610	51.9	−1.0
Liberal	Benjamin Francis Conn Costelloe	2,423	48.1	+1.0
Majority		187	3.8	−2.0
Turnout		5,033	70.0	−0.6
Registered electors		7,191		
Conservative hold		Swing	−1.0	

=== Elections in the 1900s ===
General election 1900: St Pancras East
Party	Candidate	Votes	%	±%
Conservative	Thomas Wrightson	3,016	58.9	+6.0
Liberal	John Meir Astbury	2,106	41.1	−6.0
Majority		910	17.8	+12.0
Turnout		5,122	70.7	+0.1
Registered electors		7,248		
Conservative hold		Swing	+6.0	

Lea

General election 1906: St Pancras East
Party	Candidate	Votes	%	±%
Liberal	Hugh Lea	4,208	64.4	+23.3
Conservative	Thomas Wrightson	2,327	35.6	−23.3
Majority		1,881	28.8	N/A
Turnout		6,535	82.1	+11.4
Registered electors		7,961		
Liberal gain from Conservative		Swing	+23.3	

=== Elections in the 1910s ===
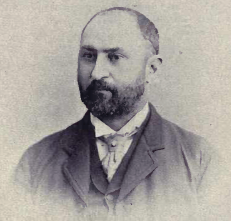
Martin

General election January 1910: St Pancras East
Party	Candidate	Votes	%	±%
Lib-Lab	Joseph Martin	4,276	54.4	−10.0
Conservative	Walter Preston	3,586	45.6	+10.0
Majority		690	8.8	−20.0
Turnout		7,862	82.9	+0.8
Registered electors		9,487		
Lib-Lab hold		Swing	−10.0	

General election December 1910: St Pancras East
Party	Candidate	Votes	%	±%
Lib-Lab	Joseph Martin	3,891	56.0	+1.6
Conservative	John Hopkins	3,038	43.7	−1.9
Suffragist	Herbert Jacobs	22	0.3	New
Majority		853	12.3	+3.5
Turnout		6,951	73.3	−9.6
Registered electors		9,487		
Lib-Lab hold		Swing	+1.8	

General Election 1914–15:

Another General Election was required to take place before the end of 1915. The political parties had been making preparations for an election to take place and by July 1914, the following candidates had been selected;

- Liberal: Joseph Martin
- Unionist: John Hopkins
