= Robert Grant Webster =

British politician

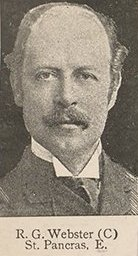
Robert Grant Webster

Robert Grant Webster, JP (12 September 1845 – 14 January 1925) was a British barrister and Conservative Party politician.

Born in Marylebone, the only son of Robert Webster, an Edinburgh advocate, Robert Grant Webster was educated at Radley College and Trinity College, Cambridge, where he took first-class honours in political economy. After taking his degree in law, he was called to the bar by the Inner Temple in 1869. He also served for sixteen years in the 3rd Battalion of the South Lancashire Regiment. During the First World War, he commanded the 16th Divisional Column, Royal Field Artillery, achieving the rank of captain.

Webster stood unsuccessfully for the Conservative Party at Cockermouth in the 1880 UK general election, and at St Pancras East in 1885, but was elected there in 1886. He held his seat until he stood down in 1899.

Webster wrote several books, including Shoulder to Shoulder, The Trade of the World, and The Law Relating to Canals.
