= George Barnes (British politician) =

British politician (1859–1940)

The Right Honourable George Barnes CH
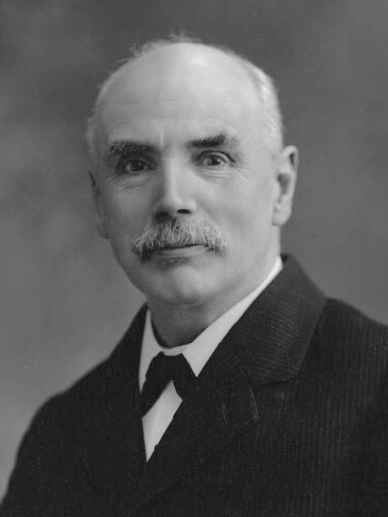
- Barnes in 1918

Leader of the Labour Party
- In office 14 February 1910 – 6 February 1911
- Deputy: J. R. Clynes
- Preceded by: Arthur Henderson
- Succeeded by: Ramsay MacDonald

Minister without portfolio
- In office 17 August 1917 – 27 January 1920
- Prime Minister: David Lloyd George
- Preceded by: Arthur Henderson
- Succeeded by: Christopher Addison

Minister of Pensions
- In office 10 December 1916 – 17 August 1917
- Prime Minister: David Lloyd George
- Preceded by: Office Created
- Succeeded by: John Hodge

Deputy Leader of the Labour Party
- In office 28 January 1908 – 14 February 1910
- Leader: Arthur Henderson
- Preceded by: David Shackleton
- Succeeded by: J. R. Clynes

Member of Parliament for Glasgow Gorbals Glasgow Blackfriars and Hutchesontown (1906–1918)
- In office 8 February 1906 – 15 November 1922
- Preceded by: Bonar Law
- Succeeded by: George Buchanan

Personal details
- Born: George Nicoll Barnes; 2 January 1859 Lochee, Dundee, Scotland, UK
- Died: 21 April 1940 (aged 81) London, England, UK
- Party: Coalition Labour (1918–1922); Labour (–1918)
- Other political affiliations: Independent Labour Party, National Democratic and Labour Party

George Nicoll Barnes CH (2 January 1859 – 21 April 1940) was a British trade union leader, Labour Party politician, and a Leader of the Labour Party (1910–1911).

== Early life ==
Barnes was born on 2 January 1859 in Lochee, Dundee, the second of five sons of James Barnes, a skilled engineer and mill manager from Yorkshire, and his wife, Catherine Adam Langlands. His brother T. B. Barnes was also active in politics, later becoming a Labour Party councillor in Dundee. The family moved back to England and settled at Ponders End in Middlesex, where his father managed a jute mill in which George himself began working at the age of eleven, after attending a church school at Enfield Highway. He then spent two years as an engineering apprentice, first at Powis James of Lambeth then at Parker's foundry, Dundee.

After finishing his apprenticeship he worked for two years at the Vickers shipyard in Barrow before returning once again to the London area, where he experienced unemployment during the slump of 1879. He had a number of short-term jobs before settling for eight years at Lucas and Aird in Fulham.

== Trade union and political involvement ==
During his time in London, Barnes became an active member of the Amalgamated Society of Engineers (ASE). He was elected to the union's Executive Council in 1889, and in 1892 became assistant general secretary. He stood for the general secretaryship of the union in 1895, but was narrowly defeated by the incumbent, John Anderson. However, the following year, Anderson was dismissed for "wilful neglect of duty", and Barnes easily beat him in a new election.

The trade union historian James Jeffreys regarded Barnes as one of the ASE's 'most efficient and able secretaries'.

Barnes led the ASE through the national thirty weeks' lock-out in 1897 over demands for a 48-hour working week. The workers were defeated, and the employers' terms were harsh. But the principle of industry-wide collective bargaining was established for the first time.

Barnes resigned the General Secretaryship in 1908, because some members in the North East had continued their strike, with official union support, after voting down a negotiated compromise settlement. He objected to the members' 'mistrust of officials and officialdom'. He felt that such conduct by members compromised the union's standing 'on the part of the employers, on the part of the community, on the part of everyone outside trade unionism'.

Barnes was a committed member of the co-operative movement, and a keen if moderate socialist, and he joined the Independent Labour Party on its foundation in 1893.

== Parliamentary career ==
Barnes (second from left) in 1906, with other leading figures in the party

At the 1895 general election Barnes stood unsuccessfully for the Independent Labour Party in Rochdale. This campaign was not supported by the ASE.

At the founding conference of the Labour Representation Committee in 1900, Barnes took 'the anti-socialist view' when he said the LRC 'should not be prisoners to class prejudice but should consider parties and policies apart from all class organisations'.

Barnes was elected as MP for Glasgow Blackfriars and Hutchesontown at the 1906 general election for the Labour Party, this time with the support of the ASE; and so he became one of the first two Labour MPs to be elected in Scotland. He sat for Blackfriars and Hutchesontown until the constituency was abolished for the 1918 general election, and thereafter sat for Glasgow Gorbals (which covered the same area) until he stood down at the 1922 election.

== From high office to expulsion ==
Barnes was Leader of the Labour Party from 14 February 1910 to 6 February 1911. As of August 2026, apart from the current post-holder, Barnes is the shortest-serving Labour leader, remaining in the post for only 11 months. Ramsay MacDonald considered that Barnes had been a 'disastrous failure' as leader.

In 1911, during the mass strike wave known as the Great Unrest, Barnes was one of the sponsors of Labour MP Will Crooks's Labour Disputes Bill, which proposed arbitration in place of strikes, with draconian penalties for strikers, and for those who encouraged or supported them. The Bill was withdrawn after it was condemned by the Trades Union Congress.

He was Minister of Pensions (1916–1917), rising to Minister without Portfolio as one of David Lloyd George's powerful five member war cabinet (1917–1920). In 1918 the Labour Party decided to leave the Lloyd George Coalition but Barnes refused to resign. As a result, he was expelled from the Labour Party, and with the British Workers League founded the pro-coalition National Democratic and Labour Party, many of whose candidates were elected on the Coalition Coupon in December 1918. He also stood in 1918 under the Coalition Labour title. He was the first cabinet minister 'to announce that he was in favour of hanging (not even for trying) the Kaiser.' Because he was nominally one of the leaders of the three Coalition parties, he was a participant at the Paris Peace Conference. At the conference he was instrumental in the creation of the International Labour Organization (ILO), he was a signatory to the Treaty of Versailles, he is featured in William Orpen's famous painting of the treaty signing (seated second from the right), and he was lionised in the iconic painting, "Statesmen of World War I" (standing directly above Winston Churchill).

== Later life ==
After resigning as a minister early in 1920 he played no further significant role in British politics. In March 1920 he was appointed a Member of the Order of the Companions of Honour for his ministerial services. He quit politics when the Labour Party announced that it would again field a candidate against him in the general election of 1922. As it was clear that the tide would turn strongly towards the official Labour candidates throughout Glasgow, and as he had no wish to serve in any other party, he decided to withdraw from his seat.

Barnes had a long and active retirement, continuing to support the International Labour Organization, serving as chairman of the Co-operative Printing Society, and publishing several books, including his autobiography, From Workshop to War Cabinet (1923), and a History of the International Labour Office (1926). He was a pleasant-looking, mild-mannered man, but little is known about his private life. In 1882 he had married Jessie, daughter of Thomas Langlands, with whom he had two sons and a daughter; his youngest son was killed in action in France while serving as a Second Lieutenant with the Gordon Highlanders during the First World War.

In 1932, he became the first president of the pacific organization The New Commonwealth. He died in 1940 at his London home, and was buried in Fulham Cemetery.

== Bibliography ==
- "Barnes, George Nicoll" in the Oxford Dictionary of National Biography
- James B. Jefferys, The Story of the Engineers (Lawrence & Wishart, 1945).

Parliament of the United Kingdom
Preceded by Bonar Law	Member of Parliament for Glasgow Blackfriars and Hutchesontown; 1906–1918	Constituency abolished
New constituency	Member of Parliament for Glasgow Gorbals; 1918–1922	Succeeded by George Buchanan
Trade union offices
Preceded by John Anderson	General Secretary of the Amalgamated Society of Engineers; 1896–1908	Succeeded by Jenkin Jones
Party political offices
Preceded by Arthur Henderson	Leader of the British Labour Party; 1910–1911	Succeeded by Ramsay MacDonald
Political offices
New post	Minister of Pensions; 1916–1917	Succeeded by John Hodge
Preceded by Arthur Henderson	Minister Without Portfolio representing Organised Labour; 1917–1920	Office abolished
