= 1902 East Down by-election =

UK election

- 5 February 1902

East Down constituency
- Registered: 8,184
- Turnout: 85.6%
	First party	Second party
	Rus	IUA
Candidate	James Wood	Robert Hugh Wallace
Party	Russellite Unionist	Irish Unionist
Popular vote	3,576	3,429
Percentage	51.0%	49.0%
Swing	New	N/A (Note: The previous election saw the MP elected unopposed, so no vote was held and no comparisons can be made.)
MP before election
James Alexander Rentoul
Irish Unionist
Elected MP
James Wood
Russellite Unionist

A by-election for the United Kingdom parliamentary constituency of East Down was held on 5 February 1902. It was caused by the incumbent MP, James Alexander Rentoul, becoming a judge and resigning as Member of Parliament. The result saw James Wood, the Russellite candidate, beat the Irish Unionist candidate.

== Background ==
The seat was regarded as a safe Unionist one, and was only contested once prior, where the Unionist candidate received over 66% of the vote.

The by-election was called in December 1901 when J.A. Rentoul, one of the most senior Ulster unionists, resigned to become a judge in London.

== Campaign ==
Two candidates were selected to run in the by-election. James Wood, a Russellite, was selected by the Ulster Farmers' and Labourers' Union to be the compulsory purchase candidate. Wood was a local solicitor, Presbyterian and unionist. Wood was also supported by the United Irish League. The Unionist candidate was R.H. Wallace, a solicitor, landlord and a South Down Militia Colonel. In the run-up to the election, Wallace was in South Africa, fighting in the Second Boer War.

It was noted that there was 'little formal Unionist organisation' in East Down.

The by-election was seen as an opportunity for William Thomas Russell's compulsory land purchase campaign. Wood, the Russellite candidate, insisted that the election was about the land question. The campaign was portrayed as a landlord-versus-tenant contest.

The election was closely followed in Britain and Ireland, and the Conservative government at the time were supportive of Wallace, with MPs travelling to the constituency to speak in his favour.

Wood was endorsed by the Northern Whig and the Down Recorder.

== Result ==
1902 by-election: East Down
Party	Candidate	Votes	%	±%
Russellite Unionist	James Wood	3,576	51.0	New
Irish Unionist	Robert Hugh Wallace	3,429	49.0	N/A
Majority		147	2.0	N/A
Turnout		7,005	85.6	N/A
Registered electors		8,184		
Russellite Unionist gain from Irish Unionist		Swing	N/A	

Wood won over support of Nationalists alongside large numbers of support in Presbyterian areas. This was termed an 'unholy alliance' of catholic and Protestant voters.

=== Result by polling station ===
The following table displays the approximate percentage result for both candidates by polling station, as reported by the Down Recorder.

Polling station	Total voters	Wood %	Wallace %
Ardglass	571	27.1	72.9
Ballyculter	276	31.9	68.1
Ballynahinch	707	75.1	24.9
Crossgar	469	59.3	40.7
Downpatrick	923	46.7	53.3
Drumaness	254	20.4	79.6
Drumbo	692	46.4	53.6
Dunmore	270	18.5	81.5
Killinchy	256	41.8	58.2
Killyleagh	433	50.3	49.7
Kilmegan	290	52.1	47.9
Lisburn	774	81.9	18.1
Saintfield	646	35.3	64.7
Seaforde	265	46.8	53.2
Tyrella	170	30.2	69.8
Total	7,005	51.0	49.0

== Previous result ==
1900 general election: East Down
Party	Candidate	Votes	%	±%
Irish Unionist	James Alexander Rentoul	Unopposed		
Irish Unionist hold				

== Legacy and aftermath ==
The East Down by-election was the first victory for a Russellite candidate. It was followed by another victory in 1903 in the North Fermanagh by election. alongside other strong showings at by-elections: this represented the electoral peak of Russellites, with them only garnering 1 seat in the 1906 general election. It was seen as a significant victory for the compulsory purchase movement, and strengthened the position of Russell.

On 25 March 1902 George Wyndham, the Chief Secretary for Ireland, presented his first land bill to Parliament following Russellite pressure.

Wood did not retain the seat at the 1906 general election, losing to the Unionist candidate. The winner, James Craig, had stood in the 1903 North Fermanagh by election.
