= 1911 North Tyrone by-election =

UK parliamentary by-election

- 6 October 1911

North Tyrone constituency
- Registered: 6,551
- Turnout: 94.5%
	First party	Second party
Candidate	Thomas Russell	Emerson Herdman
Party	Liberal	Irish Unionist
Popular vote	3,104	3,086
Percentage	50.1%	49.9%
Swing	▼1.0%	▲1.0%
MP before election
Redmond Barry
Liberal
Elected MP
Thomas Russell
Liberal

The 1911 North Tyrone by-election was a Parliamentary by-election. North Tyrone returned one Member of Parliament (MP) to the House of Commons of the United Kingdom, elected by the first past the post voting system. The by-election was held on 6 October 1911.

== Vacancy ==
The by-election was held due to the incumbent Liberal MP, Redmond Barry, becoming Lord Chancellor of Ireland, requiring him to cease membership of the House of Commons. Barry had been Liberal MP for the seat of since the 1907 North Tyrone by-election when he successfully defended the seat for the Liberals.

== Electoral history ==
Unlike most Irish seats, the Liberals rather than the Irish Nationalists, were the standard bearers for Irish Home Rule. Close results were part of the seat's tradition with the Unionists winning three times and the Liberals six times. Barry's hold on the seat had always been tenuous; His three successful defences were all in two-party contests with an Irish Unionist, where he had never polled higher than the 51.1% of the vote he polled last time:

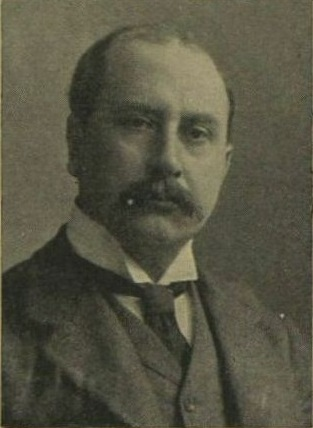
Redmond Barry

General election 14 December 1910: Tyrone North Electorate 6,572
Party	Candidate	Votes	%	±%
Liberal	Redmond Barry	3,170	51.1	+0.3
Irish Unionist	Lord Arthur John Hamilton	3,038	48.9	−0.3
Majority		132	2.2	+0.6
Turnout		6,208	94.5	−2.5
Liberal hold		Swing	+0.3	

== Candidates ==
- The Liberals chose 60-year-old Tyronian Thomas Russell as their candidate. He had sat in the House as member for neighbouring Tyrone South from 1886 to January 1910 when he had been defeated. Russell had always been a Liberal, but he had not always supported Irish Home Rule. In 1886, he joined the Liberal Unionists as he disagreed with William Gladstone over Home Rule. However he found himself at odds with mainstream Unionism and by 1906, though still describing himself as a Unionist, had reached an understanding with the Liberal party. He eventually changed his mind on Home Rule and contested the January 1910 election as a Liberal.
- The Unionist challenger was 39-year-old Emerson Herdman. He had contested the seat in January 1910 but not in December 1910.

== Campaign ==
The issue of Irish Home Rule was not prominent in the campaign, even though the Liberal Government, supported by the Irish Nationalists, was about to embark on the 3rd Irish Home Rule Bill. This was because in Tyrone, the electorate had long since made up its mind on this issue. Instead, the Unionist campaign sought to weaken the ties between the Liberal candidate and his would be supporters. A number of the Unionist influenced newspapers attempted to undermine Russell's campaign, by attacking him personally. They referred to the Liberal candidate as a 'Nationalist' and a turncoat. He was even referred to as a political Carpet-bagger, despite the fact that he was a local man.

== Result ==
The seat was narrowly held by the Liberal candidate Thomas Russell:

1911 Tyrone North by-election Electorate 6,551
Party	Candidate	Votes	%	±%
Liberal	Thomas Russell	3,104	50.1	−1.0
Irish Unionist	Emerson Herdman	3,086	49.9	+1.0
Majority		18	0.2	−2.0
Turnout		6,190	94.5	0.0
Liberal hold		Swing	-1.0	

Russell's 50.1% vote share was exactly the same as that won by Barry in the 1907 by-election.

== Aftermath ==
Russell retired from politics at the dissolution of parliament in 1918. The seat of Tyrone North was merged with part of Mid Tyrone to create a new seat of Tyrone North West. Herdman eventually was elected to the Northern Ireland Senate.
