= Sir William Moore, 1st Baronet =

Northern Ireland politician and judge (1864–1944)

The Right Honourable Sir Willam Moore
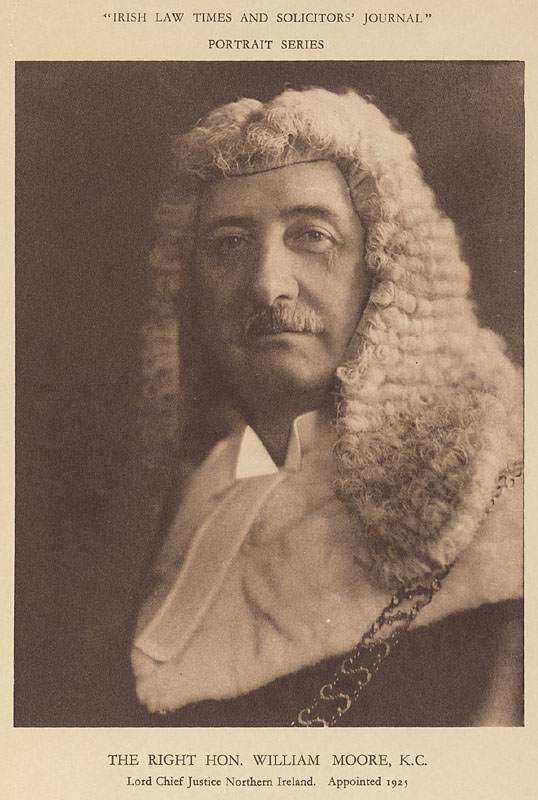

Lord Chief Justice of Northern Ireland
- In office 1925–1937
- Monarch: George V
- Preceded by: Sir Denis Henry, Bt
- Succeeded by: Sir James Andrews, Bt

Member of Parliament
- In office 25 February 1899 – 12 January 1906
- Constituency: Antrim North
- In office 16 November 1906 – 21 November 1917
- Constituency: Armagh North

Personal details
- Born: 22 November 1864 Dublin, Ireland
- Died: 28 November 1944 (aged 80) Ballymoney, County Antrim
- Party: Irish Unionist
- Education: Marlborough College; Trinity College Dublin

Sir William Moore, 1st Baronet, PC (NI), DL (22 November 1864 – 28 November 1944) was a Unionist member of the House of Commons of the United Kingdom from Ireland and a judge of Ireland, and subsequently of Northern Ireland. He was created a baronet (of Moore Lodge, Ballymoney, County Antrim, Northern Ireland) in 1932.

== Early life and education ==
Sir William was the eldest son of Victoria's honorary physician in Ireland, William Moore of Rosnashane, Ballymoney, and Sidney Blanche Fuller. His ancestors came to Ulster during the Plantation, settling at Ballymoney, at which time they were Quakers. The Moore Lodge estate was inherited from a relative; the family owned several other houses: Moore's Grove and Moore's Fort.

Sir William was educated at Marlborough College, then attended Trinity College Dublin, where he was president of the University Philosophical Society. In 1888 he married Helen Gertrude Wilson (1863–1944), the daughter of a deputy lieutenant of County Armagh. They had three children. Sir William went on to become a deputy lieutenant for County Antrim and a Justice of the Peace.

== Legal career ==
Moore was called to the Irish Bar in 1887, to the English bar in 1899, and became an Irish Queen's Counsel the same year.

In 1903, Sir William was one of the first landowners of Ireland to sell off their estates under the land acts. By the early 1920s he owned a Belfast pied-à-terre called Glassnabreedon (Moore's public school pronunciation of 'Glas-na-Braden'), in the village of Whitehouse, 4 miles north of Belfast. This house was once owned by the son of Nicholas Grimshaw (1747–1805), Ireland's first cotton pioneer.

== Political career ==
Moore was a Member of Parliament (MP) for North Antrim from 1899 to 1906. From 1903 to 1904, he was an unpaid secretary to the Chief Secretary for Ireland. At the 1906 general election, he lost the seat to the Russellite Unionist candidate, Robert Glendinning. Later that year, Moore was elected at 1906 North Armagh by-election. He represented North Armagh until his appointment as a judge.

He became a member of the General Synod of the Church of Ireland and was a founder member of the Ulster Unionist Council. He was a passionate Orangeman: his vehemence in defending Ulster's right to oppose Irish Home Rule is said to have alarmed even those who shared his views. Speaking in England on 10 March 1913 Moore made his feelings clear on the possibility of Irish Home Rule: "I have no doubt, if Home Rule is carried, its baptism in Ireland will be a baptism in blood." He showed little respect for English politicians, and had nothing but contempt for Southern Unionists. The eventual political settlement in 1921 met with his approval.

== Judicial career ==
He was appointed to the High Court of Justice in Ireland in 1917. He was sworn of the Privy Council of Ireland in the 1921 Birthday Honours, entitling him to the style "The Right Honourable". Following the partition of Ireland, he became a Lord Justice of Appeal in the Northern Ireland Court of Appeal in 1921. He was sworn of the Privy Council of Northern Ireland in 1922. In 1925, he succeeded Sir Denis Henry as Lord Chief Justice of Northern Ireland. Moore held the position until his retirement in 1937.

== Death ==
Moore died at his home, Moore Lodge, in Ballymoney on 28 November 1944, less than a week after his 80th birthday. He was buried in the family burial ground, "Lamb's Fold", two days later. His eldest son, William (1891–1978), succeeded to the barontecy.

Parliament of the United Kingdom
Preceded by Hugh McCalmont	Member of Parliament for North Antrim; 1899–1906	Succeeded by Robert Glendinning
Preceded by Edward James Saunderson	Member of Parliament for North Armagh; 1906–1917	Succeeded by William Allen
Legal offices
Preceded by Denis Henry	Lord Chief Justice of Northern Ireland; 1925–1937	Succeeded by James Andrews
Baronetage of the United Kingdom
New creation	Baronet (of Moore Lodge); 1932–1944	Succeeded by William Samson Moore
