= Rentoul =

Rentoul is a surname. Notable people with the surname include:

- Erminda Rentoul Esler, née Erminda Rentoul, (1852? – 1924), Irish novelist
- Gervais Rentoul (1884–1946), British politician
- Ida Rentoul Outhwaite, née Ida Rentoul, (1888–1960), Australian illustrator of children's books
- James Alexander Rentoul (1854–1919), British judge and politician
- John Rentoul (born 1958), British journalist
- John Laurence Rentoul (1846–1926), Australian Presbyterian minister and poet
