= Patrick McCarry =

Irish republican (1875–1921)

Patrick McCarry (1875 – 18 July 1921) was an Irish republican activist who was assassinated.

Born in Murlough in County Antrim, McCarry worked as a farmer and became active in the Gaelic League. He joined the Irish Volunteers in 1914, then the Irish Republican Army during the Irish War of Independence.

At the 1918 UK general election, McCarry stood for Sinn Féin in North Antrim, taking 21.7% of the vote against a single opponent, the Irish Unionist Peter Kerr-Smiley.

McCarry served as a local magistrate and, as such, regularly visited the local police station. In July 1921, when he arrived, he was shot dead by a recently recruited member of the B Specials.
