= North Antrim (UK Parliament constituency) =

Parliamentary constituency in the United Kingdom, 1950 onwards

Coordinates: 55.121°N 6.329°W

- County constituency for the House of Commons
- Boundary of North Antrim in Northern Ireland
- Major settlements: Ballymena, Ballymoney and Ballycastle

Current constituency
- Created: 1950
- Member of Parliament: Jim Allister (TUV)
- Created from: Antrim

1885–1922
- Created from: Antrim
- Replaced by: Antrim

North Antrim is a parliamentary constituency of the United Kingdom House of Commons located in County Antrim, Northern Ireland. The current Member of Parliament is Jim Allister of Traditional Unionist Voice (TUV), who was first elected in the 2024 general election.

== Constituency profile ==
North Antrim is a large rural constituency located in County Antrim. It covers a largely rural area centred on the towns of Ballymena, Ballymoney, and Bushmills, along with surrounding villages and farmland. The constituency includes landmarks like Giant's Causeway and stretches of the Causeway Coast.

The constituency is predominantly Protestant with a smaller Catholic minority. Ethnically, the constituency is 98% White. Immigration levels are much lower than in urban parts of Northern Ireland.

Politically, North Antrim is considered one of the strongest unionist seats in Northern Ireland. In the 2016 EU referendum, North Antrim recorded one of the highest leave votes in Northern Ireland with 62% voting to Leave the European Union. Westminster elections in the constituency have historically returned right-wing unionist candidates.

== Boundaries ==
Map of previous boundaries

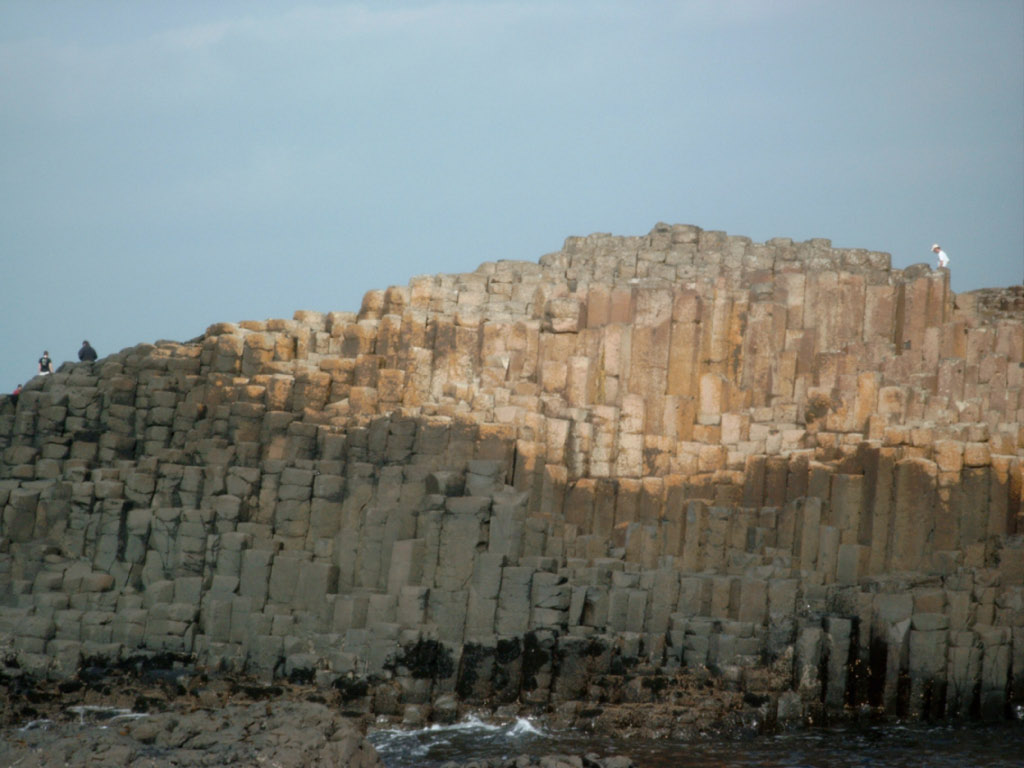
Giant's Causeway

1950–1974: The Boroughs of Ballymena and Larne, the Urban Districts of Ballycastle, Ballymoney, and Portrush, the Rural Districts of Ballycastle, Ballymena, and Ballymoney, and in the Rural District of Larne the electoral divisions of Ardclinis, Ballycor, Carncastle, Glenarm North, Glenarm South, Glencloy, and Kilwaughter.

1974–1983: The Boroughs of Ballymena, Carrickfergus, and Larne, the Urban Districts of Ballycastle, Ballymoney, Portrush, and Whitehead, the Rural Districts of Ballycastle, Ballymena, and Ballymoney, and in the Rural District of Larne the electoral divisions of Ardclinis, Ballycor, Carncastle, Eden, Glenarm North, Glenarm South, Glencloy, Glynn, Islandmagee North, Islandmagee South, Kilwaughter, Middle Division, Raloo, and Templecorran.

1983–2010: The District of Ballymena, the District of Ballymoney, and the District of Moyle.

2010–present: The District of Ballymena, the District of Ballymoney, and the District of Moyle wards of Armoy, Ballylough, Bushmills, Bonamargy and Rathlin, Carnmoon, Dalriada, Dunseverick, Glenshesk, Glentaisie, Kinbane, Knocklayd, Moss Side, and Moyarget.

North Antrim has always been a county constituency comprising the northern part of County Antrim in the north-east of Northern Ireland. It has the sea to the north and east and parts of the border with County Londonderry to the west – the County Antrim town of Portrush is included in the East Londonderry constituency (although it was in this seat until 1983).

North Antrim constituency, 1885–1922

From 1885, this constituency was one of four county divisions carved out of the former constituency of Antrim. It comprised the baronies of Cary, Dunluce Lower, Dunluce Upper and Kilconway and returned one Member of Parliament from 1885 until 1922, when it was merged into a new Antrim constituency.

North Antrim was re-created in 1950 when the old Antrim two MP constituency was abolished as part of the final move to single member seats.

The constituency is largely rural. Amongst the features within its boundaries are Rathlin Island and Giant's Causeway.

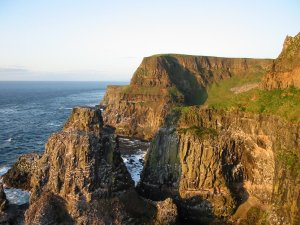
Rathlin Island

The Boundary Commission initially proposed alterations for the boundaries of North Antrim prior to the 2010 general election. It was proposed to transfer Ballycastle and the Glens, including Rathlin Island, in Moyle to East Antrim and rename that seat Antrim Coast & Glens. However that proposal raised many questions, with some arguing that the Glens have no natural ties to Jordanstown. Following consultation and revision, the constituency alterations were passed through the Northern Ireland Parliamentary Constituencies Order.

== History ==
North Antrim is an overwhelmingly unionist seat. It first existed from 1885 to 1922. From 1886 to 1974, the Unionist members of the United Kingdom House of Commons sat with the Conservative Party.

Unusually for Ireland, the Liberal Party retained significant strength in this constituency after the split over Home Rule in 1886. The Irish Parliamentary Party never contested the seat.

In 1906 the constituency was won by a Russellite Unionist, at least somewhat linked to the Liberal Party. Although the Unionists regained the seat when the sitting MP retired, the constituency was one of very few Unionist/Liberal marginals in Ireland at both 1910 elections.

A victory for the Unionist candidate in 1918 by 9,621 votes to Sinn Féin's 2,673 votes demonstrated the strength of the unionist support in the area.

In 1922, the constituency reverted to being part of the two member Antrim seat (as it had been before 1885). North Antrim was re-created in 1950 as a larger seat than it had been in its first incarnation. County Antrim, excluding the parts in the Belfast constituencies, was split into two divisions instead of four as previously. The 1950 North Antrim was comparable to the North and Mid Antrim divisions which had existed from 1885 to 1922.

Since 1950 the Westminster elections have been relatively uncompetitive. In 1951, it was one of the last four seats to be uncontested in a UK general election. More recently, one man repeatedly won by a large majority: Ian Paisley was first elected as a Protestant Unionist Party candidate in the 1970 general election after narrowly defeating sitting member Henry Clark. The following year that party changed to the Democratic Unionist Party and Paisley easily held the seat for 40 years until his retirement in 2010. This is the longest continuous period for which the current holding party has held any Northern Irish seat. In elections at all levels, the DUP have frequently had their highest share of the vote in North Antrim and have rarely been seriously challenged.

In March 2010 Ian Paisley announced that he would step down at the 2010 general election. His son Ian Paisley Jr was selected by the DUP to replace him as candidate. Former DUP MEP Jim Allister announced that he would contest the constituency for the Traditional Unionist Voice. Paisley Jr was elected with a significantly reduced majority.

In July 2018 North Antrim was the site of the first recall petition UK held in the under the provisions of the Recall of MPs Act 2015. This petition was launched following a critical report into Paisley Jr's conduct in respect to an undeclared trip to Sri Lanka, and Paisley Jr subsequently being suspended from the Commons for 30 days. The petition was signed by 9.4% of the electorate, short of the 10% required to unseat Paisley Jr and trigger a by-election.

== Members of Parliament ==
The Member of Parliament since the 2024 general election is Jim Allister of the TUV, after the DUP lost the seat for the first time since gaining it in 1970 as the Protestant Unionist Party. It had also been the first time in 50 years that the seat was not held by a member of the Paisley family.

North Antrim has had comparatively few MPs in its lifetime compared to other parliamentary constituencies. Sir Hugh O'Neill had sat for one of the predecessor seats of Mid Antrim between 1915 and 1922 and Antrim between 1922 until 1950, making this one of the few seats where four individuals between them represented the seat continuously over a period of ninety years.

Election	Member	Party
1885	Edward Macnaghten	Conservative
1887 by-election	Sir Charles Lewis Bt	Conservative
1891	Sir Charles Lewis Bt	Irish Unionist
1892	Charles Connor	Irish Unionist
1895	Colonel Hugh McCalmont	Irish Unionist
1899 by-election	William Moore	Irish Unionist
1906	Robert Glendinning	Russellite Unionist
1910 (Jan)	Peter Kerr-Smiley	Irish Unionist
1922	Constituency abolished. See Antrim	
1950	Constituency recreated	
1950	Sir Hugh O'Neill	Ulster Unionist
1952 by-election	Phelim O'Neill	Ulster Unionist
1959	Henry Clark	Ulster Unionist
1970	Ian Paisley	Protestant Unionist
1971	Ian Paisley	Democratic Unionist
2010	Ian Paisley Jr	Democratic Unionist
2018	Ian Paisley Jr	Independent
2018	Ian Paisley Jr	Democratic Unionist
2024	Jim Allister	Traditional Unionist Voice

== Elections ==
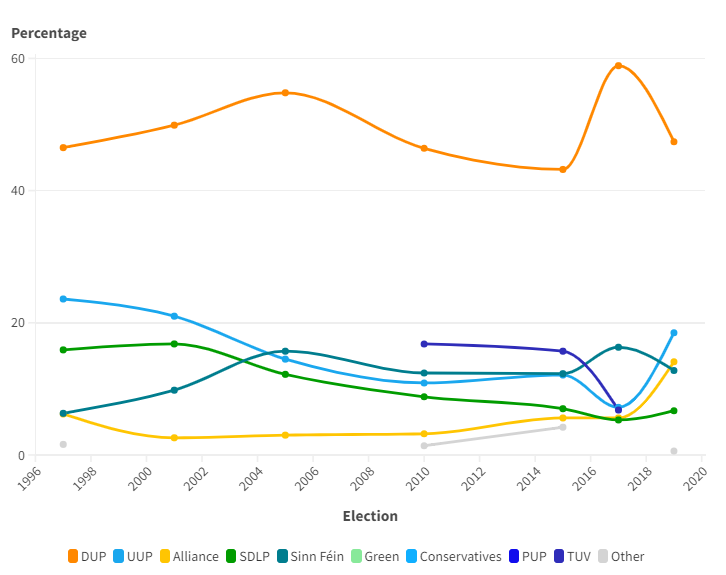

=== Elections in the 2020s ===
2024 general election: North Antrim
Party	Candidate	Votes	%	±%
TUV	Jim Allister	11,642	28.3	New
DUP	Ian Paisley Jr	11,192	27.2	−23.6
Sinn Féin	Philip McGuigan	7,714	18.7	+7.4
Alliance	Sian Mulholland	4,488	10.9	−3.4
UUP	Jackson Minford	3,901	9.5	−7.4
SDLP	Helen Maher	1,661	4.0	−1.9
Aontú	Ráichéal Mhic Niocaill	451	1.1	New
Independent	Tristan Morrow	136	0.3	N/A
Majority		450	1.1	N/A
Turnout		41,185	55.1	−2.0
Registered electors		74,697		
TUV gain from DUP		Swing	+26.0	

This was the first time the TUV gained a UK Parliament seat, as well as the first time in over 50 years the DUP lost the seat, since Ian Paisley gained it in 1970 as the Protestant Unionist Party candidate.

=== Elections in the 2010s ===
2019 general election: North Antrim
Party	Candidate	Votes	%	±%
DUP	Ian Paisley Jr	20,860	47.4	−11.5
UUP	Robin Swann	8,139	18.5	+11.3
Alliance	Patricia O'Lynn	6,231	14.1	+8.5
Sinn Féin	Cara McShane	5,632	12.8	−3.5
SDLP	Margaret Anne McKillop	2,943	6.7	+1.4
Independent	Stephen Palmer	246	0.6	New
Majority		12,721	28.9	−13.7
Turnout		44,051	57.1	−7.0
Registered electors		77,147		
DUP hold		Swing	−11.4	

2017 general election: North Antrim
Party	Candidate	Votes	%	±%
DUP	Ian Paisley Jr	28,521	58.9	+15.7
Sinn Féin	Cara McShane	7,878	16.3	+4.0
UUP	Jackson Minford	3,482	7.2	−4.9
TUV	Timothy Gaston	3,282	6.8	−8.9
Alliance	Patricia O'Lynn	2,723	5.6	0.0
SDLP	Declan O'Loan	2,574	5.3	−1.7
Majority		20,643	42.6	+15.1
Turnout		48,460	64.1	+8.9
Registered electors		75,657		
DUP hold		Swing	+5.8	

2015 general election: North Antrim
Party	Candidate	Votes	%	±%
DUP	Ian Paisley Jr	18,107	43.2	−3.2
TUV	Timothy Gaston	6,561	15.7	−1.2
Sinn Féin	Daithí McKay	5,143	12.3	−0.1
UUP	Robin Swann	5,054	12.1	+1.1
SDLP	Declan O'Loan	2,925	7.0	−1.8
Alliance	Jayne Dunlop	2,351	5.6	+2.4
UKIP	Robert Hill	1,341	3.2	New
NI Conservatives	Carol Freeman	368	0.9	New
Independent	Thomas Palmer	57	0.1	N/A
Majority		11,546	27.5	−2.1
Turnout		41,907	55.2	−2.6
Registered electors		75,876		
DUP hold		Swing	−1.0	

2010 general election: North Antrim
Party	Candidate	Votes	%	±%
DUP	Ian Paisley Jr	19,672	46.4	−10.4
TUV	Jim Allister	7,114	16.8	New
Sinn Féin	Daithí McKay	5,265	12.4	−1.8
UCU-NF	Irwin Armstrong	4,634	10.9	−4.1
SDLP	Declan O'Loan	3,738	8.8	−2.2
Alliance	Jayne Dunlop	1,368	3.2	+0.2
Independent	Lyle Cubitt	606	1.4	New
Majority		12,558	29.6	−9.5
Turnout		42,397	57.8	−7.3
Registered electors		73,338		
DUP hold		Swing		

=== Elections in the 2000s ===
2005 general election: North Antrim
Party	Candidate	Votes	%	±%
DUP	Ian Paisley	25,156	54.8	+4.9
Sinn Féin	Philip McGuigan	7,191	15.7	+5.9
UUP	Rodney McCune	6,637	14.5	−6.5
SDLP	Sean Farren	5,585	12.2	−4.6
Alliance	Jayne Dunlop	1,357	3.0	+0.4
Majority		17,965	39.1	−10.2
Turnout		45,926	61.7	−4.4
Registered electors		73,938		
DUP hold		Swing	−0.5	

2001 general election: North Antrim
Party	Candidate	Votes	%	±%
DUP	Ian Paisley	24,539	49.9	+3.4
UUP	Lexie Scott	10,315	21.0	−2.6
SDLP	Sean Farren	8,283	16.8	+0.9
Sinn Féin	John Kelly	4,822	9.8	+3.5
Alliance	Jayne Dunlop	1,258	2.6	−3.6
Majority		14,224	28.9	+6.0
Turnout		49,217	66.1	+2.3
Registered electors		74,451		
DUP hold		Swing	+3.0	

=== Elections in the 1990s ===
1997 general election: North Antrim
Party	Candidate	Votes	%	±%
DUP	Ian Paisley	21,495	46.5	−4.4
UUP	James Leslie	10,921	23.6	+5.5
SDLP	Sean Farren	7,333	15.9	+1.6
Sinn Féin	James McGarry	2,896	6.3	+2.1
Alliance	David Alderdice	2,845	6.2	−1.4
NI Women's Coalition	Bronagh Hinds	580	1.3	New
Natural Law	John Wright	116	0.3	New
Majority		10,574	22.9	−9.9
Turnout		46,186	63.8	−2.0
Registered electors		72,491		
DUP hold		Swing	−5.0	

1992 general election: North Antrim
Party	Candidate	Votes	%	±%
DUP	Ian Paisley	23,152	50.9	−17.8
UUP	Joe Gaston	8,216	18.1	New
SDLP	Sean Farren	6,512	14.3	−1.8
Alliance	John Williams	3,442	7.6	−4.8
NI Conservatives	Thomas Sowler	2,263	5.0	New
Sinn Féin	James McGarry	1,916	4.2	−2.2
Majority		14,936	32.8	−23.4
Turnout		45,501	65.8	+3.0
Registered electors		69,114		
DUP hold		Swing		

=== Elections in the 1980s ===
1987 general election: North Antrim
Party	Candidate	Votes	%	±%
DUP	Ian Paisley	28,283	68.7	+14.5
SDLP	Sean Farren	5,149	12.5	−1.5
Alliance	John Williams	5,140	12.4	New
Sinn Féin	Sean Reagan	2,633	6.4	−0.1
Majority		23,234	56.2	+26.3
Turnout		41,205	62.8	−7.0
Registered electors		65,733		
DUP hold		Swing		

1986 North Antrim by-election
Party	Candidate	Votes	%	±%
DUP	Ian Paisley	33,937	97.4	+43.2
"For the Anglo-Irish Agreement"	"Peter Barry" (Wesley Williamson)	515	2.6	New
Majority		33,024	94.8	+64.9
Turnout		34,452	53.5	−16.3
Registered electors		65,157		
DUP hold		Swing		

1983 general election: North Antrim
Party	Candidate	Votes	%	±%
DUP	Ian Paisley	23,922	54.2	+2.5
UUP	Robert Coulter	10,749	24.3	+0.9
SDLP	Sean Farren	6,193	14.0	+6.6
Sinn Féin	Pearse McMahon	2,860	6.5	New
Ecology	Malcolm Samuel	451	1.0	New
Majority		13,173	29.9	+1.6
Turnout		44,175	69.8	+5.5
Registered electors		63,228		
DUP hold		Swing		

=== Elections in the 1970s ===
1979 general election: North Antrim
Party	Candidate	Votes	%	±%
DUP	Ian Paisley	33,941	51.7	−20.9
UUP	Jeremy Burchill	15,398	23.4	New
Alliance	Hugh Wilson	7,797	11.9	−2.7
SDLP	Sean Farren	4,867	7.4	−5.4
Irish Independence	John Turnley	3,689	5.6	New
Majority		18,543	28.3	−29.7
Turnout		65,692	64.3	+7.0
Registered electors		102,202		
DUP hold		Swing		

October 1974 general election: North Antrim
Party	Candidate	Votes	%	±%
DUP	Ian Paisley	43,186	72.6	+9.1
Alliance	Hugh Wilson	8,689	14.6	New
SDLP	Mary McAlister	7,616	12.8	−2.7
Majority		34,497	58.0	+15.5
Turnout		59,491	57.3	−5.8
Registered electors		103,737		
DUP hold		Swing		

February 1974 general election: North Antrim
Party	Candidate	Votes	%	±%
DUP	Ian Paisley	41,282	63.5	+22.1
Pro-Assembly Unionist	T. E. Utley	13,651	21.0	New
SDLP	Mary McAlister	10,056	15.5	New
Majority		27,631	42.5	+37.9
Turnout		64,989	63.1	−10.3
Registered electors		104,168		
DUP hold		Swing		

1970 general election: North Antrim
Party	Candidate	Votes	%	±%
Protestant Unionist	Ian Paisley	24,130	41.2	New
UUP	Henry Clark	21,451	36.6	−41.5
NI Labour	Patrick McHugh	6,476	11.0	New
National Democratic	Alasdair McDonnell	4,312	7.4	New
Ulster Liberal	Richard Moore	2,269	3.9	−18.0
Majority		2,679	4.6	N/A
Turnout		58,638	73.4	+16.7
Registered electors		79,930		
Protestant Unionist gain from UUP		Swing		

=== Elections in the 1960s ===
1966 general election: North Antrim
Party	Candidate	Votes	%	±%
UUP	Henry Clark	31,927	78.1	−12.0
Ulster Liberal	Richard Moore	8,941	21.9	New
Majority		22,986	56.2	−24.0
Turnout		40,868	56.7	−6.4
Registered electors		72,039		
UUP hold		Swing		

1964 general election: North Antrim
Party	Candidate	Votes	%	±%
UUP	Henry Clark	40,372	90.1	−4.8
Ind. Republican	Seán Caughey	4,424	9.9	New
Majority		35,948	80.2	−9.6
Turnout		44,796	63.3	−1.2
Registered electors		70,762		
UUP hold		Swing		

=== Elections in the 1950s ===
1959 general election: North Antrim
Party	Candidate	Votes	%	±%
UUP	Henry Clark	42,807	94.9	+8.9
Sinn Féin	John Dougan	2,280	5.1	−8.9
Majority		40,527	89.8	+17.8
Turnout		45,087	64.5	−7.7
Registered electors		69,880		
UUP hold		Swing		

1955 general election: North Antrim
Party	Candidate	Votes	%	±%
UUP	Phelim O'Neill	41,763	86.0	N/A
Sinn Féin	John Dougan	6,809	14.0	N/A
Majority		34,954	72.0	N/A
Turnout		48,572	72.2	N/A
Registered electors		67,315		
UUP hold		Swing	N/A	

1952 North Antrim by-election
Party	Candidate	Votes	%	±%
UUP	Phelim O'Neill	Unopposed		
Registered electors				
UUP hold				

1951 general election: North Antrim
Party	Candidate	Votes	%	±%
UUP	Hugh O'Neill	Unopposed		
Registered electors		68,448		
UUP hold				

1950 general election: North Antrim
Party	Candidate	Votes	%	±%
UUP	Hugh O'Neill	Unopposed		
Registered electors		68,759		
UUP win (new seat)				

=== Elections in the 1910s ===
1918 general election: North Antrim
Party	Candidate	Votes	%	±%
Irish Unionist	Peter Kerr-Smiley	9,621	78.3	+23.8
Sinn Féin	Patrick McCarry	2,673	21.7	New
Majority		6,948	56.6	+47.6
Turnout		12,294	64.3	−22.6
Registered electors				
Irish Unionist hold		Swing		

December 1910 general election: North Antrim
Party	Candidate	Votes	%	±%
Irish Unionist	Peter Kerr-Smiley	3,557	54.5	+1.6
Liberal	William Macafee	2,974	45.5	−1.6
Majority		583	9.0	+3.2
Turnout		6,531	86.9	−1.6
Registered electors		7,516		
Irish Unionist hold		Swing	+1.6	

January 1910 general election: North Antrim
Party	Candidate	Votes	%	±%
Irish Unionist	Peter Kerr-Smiley	3,519	52.9	−8.8
Liberal	William James Baxter	3,135	47.1	New
Majority		384	5.8	N/A
Turnout		6,654	88.5	+2.6
Registered electors		7,516		
Irish Unionist gain from Russellite Unionist		Swing		

=== Elections in the 1900s ===
1906 general election: North Antrim
Party	Candidate	Votes	%	±%
Russellite Unionist	Robert Glendinning	3,757	55.9	N/A
Irish Unionist	William Moore	2,969	44.1	N/A
Majority		788	11.8	N/A
Turnout		6,726	85.9	N/A
Registered electors		7,829		
Russellite Unionist gain from Irish Unionist		Swing	N/A	

1900 general election: North Antrim
Party	Candidate	Votes	%	±%
Irish Unionist	William Moore	Unopposed		
Registered electors				
Irish Unionist hold				

=== Elections in the 1890s ===
1899 North Antrim by-election
Party	Candidate	Votes	%	±%
Irish Unionist	William Moore	Unopposed		
Registered electors				
Irish Unionist hold				

1895 general election: North Antrim
Party	Candidate	Votes	%	±%
Irish Unionist	Hugh McCalmont	Unopposed		
Registered electors				
Irish Unionist hold				

1892 general election: North Antrim
Party	Candidate	Votes	%	±%
Irish Unionist	Charles Connor	4,666	69.7	−0.2
Liberal	William Huston Dodd	2,027	30.3	+0.2
Majority		2,639	39.4	−0.4
Turnout		6,693	74.1	+3.3
Registered electors		9,035		
Irish Unionist hold		Swing	−0.2	

=== Elections in the 1880s ===
1887 North Antrim by-election
Party	Candidate	Votes	%	±%
Irish Conservative	Charles Lewis	3,858	56.7	−13.2
Liberal	Samuel Craig McElroy	2,526	37.1	+7.0
Ind. Unionist	William Atcheson Traill	424	6.2	New
Majority		1,332	19.6	−20.2
Turnout		6,808	71.6	+0.8
Registered electors		9,505		
Irish Conservative hold		Swing	−10.1	

- Caused by MacNaghten being appointed Lord of Appeal.

1886 general election: North Antrim
Party	Candidate	Votes	%	±%
Irish Conservative	Edward MacNaghten	4,429	69.9	+25.6
Liberal	Samuel Craig McElroy	1,910	30.1	+0.6
Majority		2,519	39.8	+25.0
Turnout		6,339	70.8	−10.7
Registered electors		8,948		
Irish Conservative hold		Swing	+12.4	

1885 general election: North Antrim
Party	Candidate	Votes	%	±%
Irish Conservative	Edward MacNaghten	3,233	44.3	
Liberal	William Pirrie Sinclair	2,149	29.5	
Independent	John Pinkerton	1,915	26.2	
Majority		1,084	14.8	
Turnout		7,297	81.5	
Registered electors		8,948		
Irish Conservative win (new seat)				

== See also ==
- List of parliamentary constituencies in Northern Ireland

Parliament of the United Kingdom
Preceded by Horsham	Constituency represented by the father of the House; 1951–1952	Succeeded by Gower
