= James Wood (Irish politician) =

Irish politician

James Wood (17 July 1867 – 31 October 1936) was an Irish land reformer and, as a Russellite Unionist, was a Member of the United Kingdom Parliament (MP) for East Down.

Supported by what the Unionist leader Edward Carson described as "an unholy alliance of Catholics and Protestants", he was elected as a Russellite Unionist MP for the East Down constituency in a 1902 by-election, defeating Carson's candidate, the local landlord Colonel R.H. Wallace of Myra Castle. The victory boosted Thomas Russell's campaign for compulsory, and assisted, land sales to tenants, which won a measure of success in the Irish Land Act 1903 (3 Edw. 7. c. 37). Wood, standing as a Liberal, lost his seat at the 1906 general election to the Unionist James Craig. He lost again to Craig in the January 1910 general election.

On his death, the Irish News described him as "unsparing in his efforts on behalf of the downtrodden small farmers under the regime of landlordism".

Parliament of the United Kingdom
Preceded by James Alexander Rentoul	Member of Parliament for East Down; 1902 – 1906	Succeeded by James Craig
