= 1906 United Kingdom general election in Ireland =

- 13–26 January 1906

103 seats for Ireland of the 670 seats in the House of Commons
- Turnout: 82.1% (▲21.2 pp)
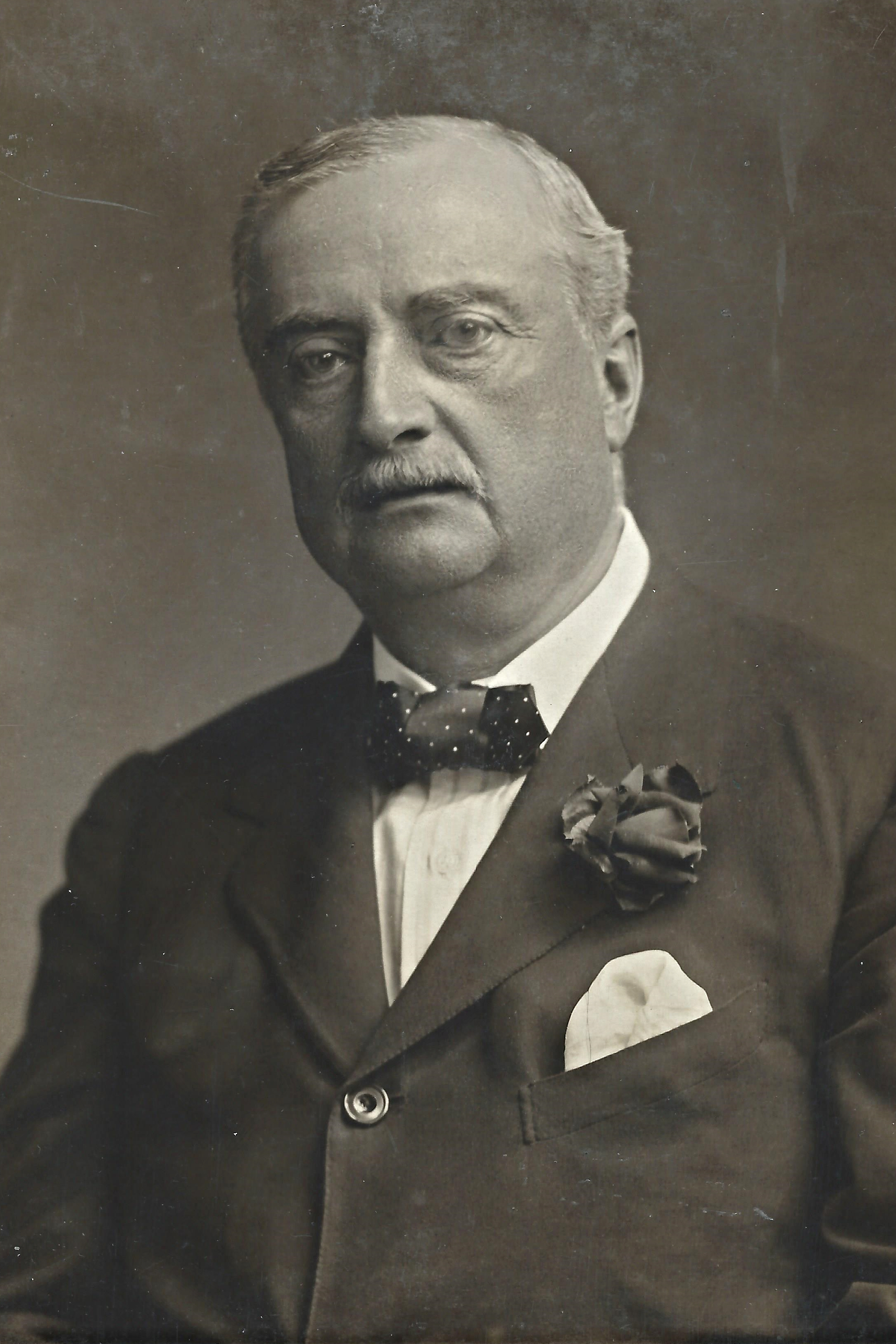

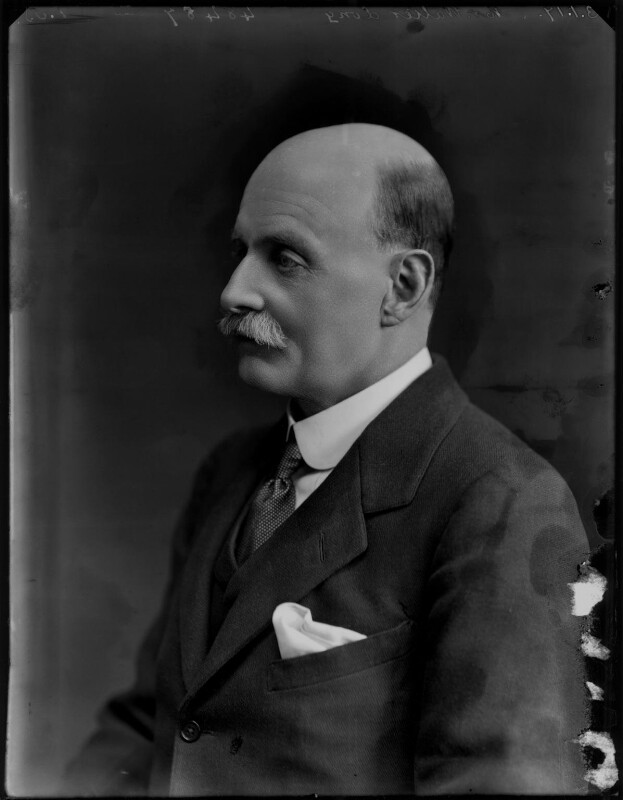

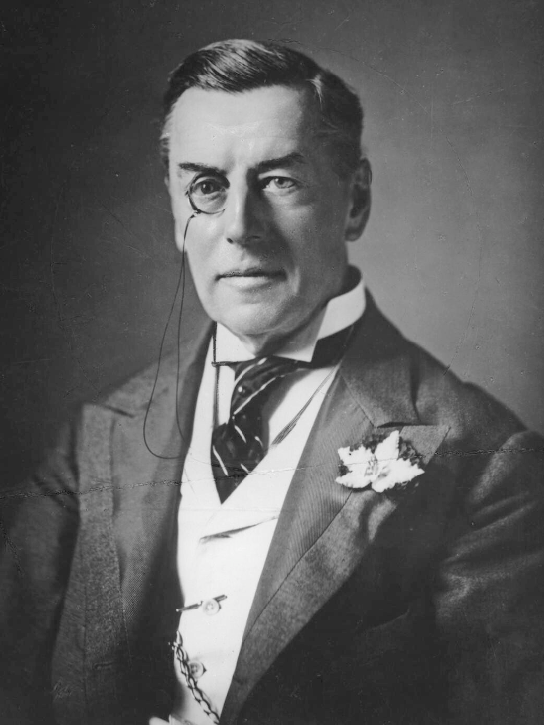

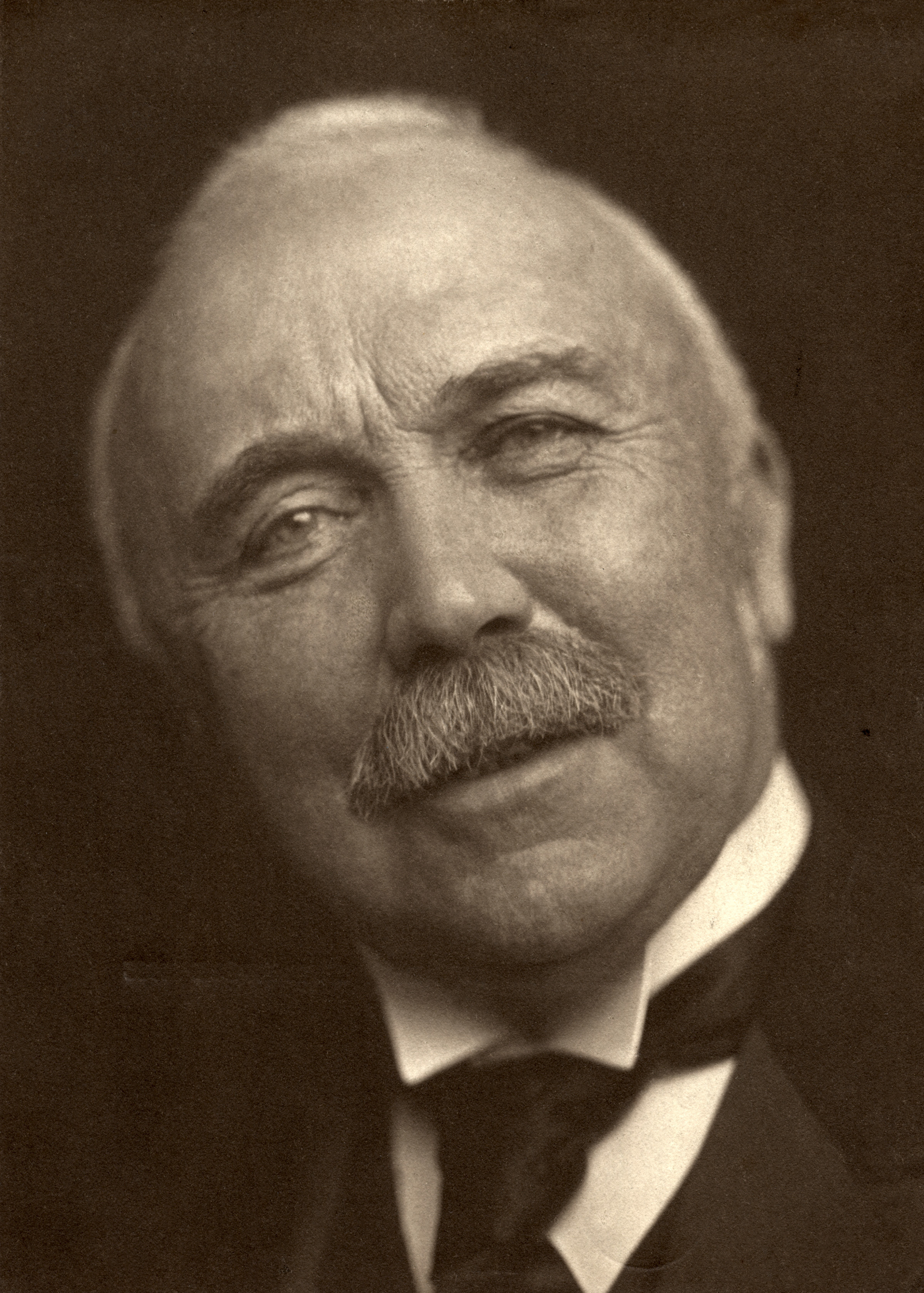

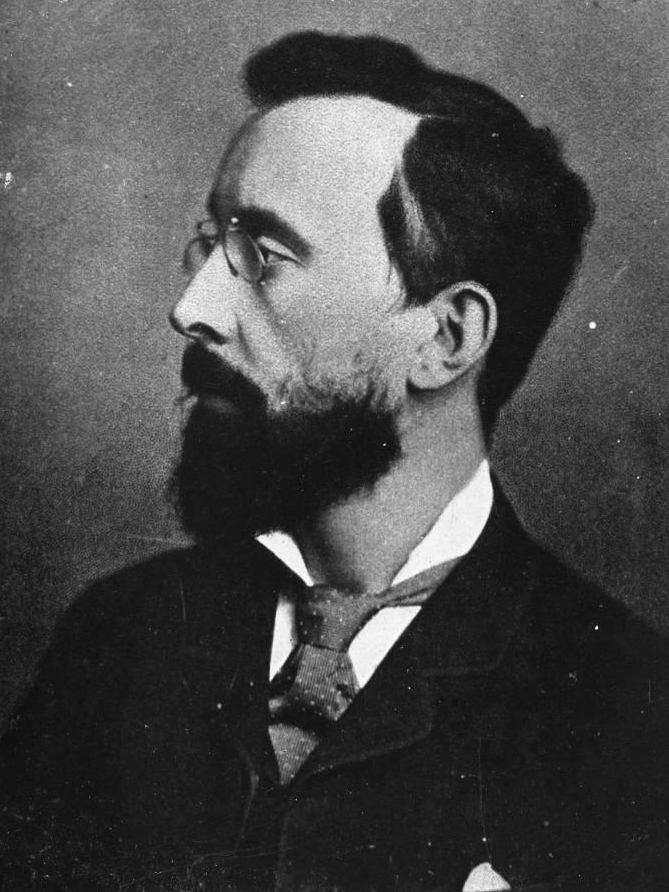
	First party	Second party	Third party
			Rus
Leader	John Redmond	Walter Long	Sir Thomas Russell
Party	Irish Parliamentary	Irish Unionist	Russellite Unionist
Alliance		Conservative-Liberal Unionist
Leader since	1900	1906	1904
Leader's seat	Waterford City	South Dublin	South Tyrone
Last election	76 seats, 40.2%	17 seats, 30.5%	Did not stand
Seats won	81	16	2
Seat change	▲5	▼1	▲2
Popular vote	28,292	53,438	26,183
Percentage	21.0%	39.1%	19.4%
Swing	▼19.2 pp	▲8.6 pp	New party
	Fourth party	Fifth party	Sixth party
Leader	Joseph Chamberlain	Henry Campbell-Bannerman	Tim Healy
Party	Liberal Unionist	Liberal	Healyite Nationalist
Alliance	Conservative-Liberal Unionist	Gladstone–MacDonald pact
Leader since	1903	December 1898	1895
Leader's seat	Birmingham West	Stirling Burghs	North Louth
Last election	4 seats, 1.7%	1 seat, 2.0%	4 seats, 14.8%
Seats won	1	1	1
Seat change	▼3	Steady	▼3
Popular vote	10,652	2,966	0
Percentage	7.9%	2.2%	0.0%
Swing	▲6.2 pp	▲0.2 pp	▼14.8 pp

From 13–26 January 1906, the 1906 United Kingdom general election was held in Ireland. Of the 670 seats in the House of Commons, 103 were in Ireland; 101 represented 100 county and borough territorial constituencies, with 2 seats representing Cork City; and two additional seats represented the Dublin University wherein only graduates of the university could vote.

The election was held as a result of the resignation of the Conservative Government after a series of defeats in by-elections and internal disputes over tariff reform. The Liberal Party formed a minority Liberal Government and immediately requested a dissolution. It was the first of two general elections held during the reign of King Edward VII.

When combined with results from across the United Kingdom the result was a landslide victory for the Liberals against the Conservative Party, whose leader, Arthur Balfour, lost his seat, and its allies the Liberal Unionist Party; the Conservatives won the lowest number of seats it ever had in its history, a nadir unsurpassed until 2024. The primary reason given by historians for the Conservatives and Liberal Unionists' weakness resulted from the party's split over the issue of free trade (Joseph Chamberlain had resigned from government in September 1903 in order to campaign for Tariff Reform, which would allow "preferential tariffs"). Many working-class people at the time saw this as a threat to the price of food, hence the debate was nicknamed "Big Loaf, Little Loaf". The Liberals' landslide victory of 125 seats over all other parties led to the passing of social legislation known as the Liberal reforms. This was the first time since the split in the Liberal Party in 1886 that they governed without the support of the Irish Parliamentary Party.

The Irish Parliamentary Party won 81 of the 103 Irish seats on 21.0% of the vote because, in many constituencies, the candidates were unopposed.

== Candidates ==
Below is a table summarising the candidates of the 1906 general election in Ireland, excluding those who stood in the University constituency of Dublin University.

Affiliation	Candidates
Irish Parliamentary Party	82
Irish Unionist Party	20
Russellite Unionist	9
Liberal Unionist Party	4 (Note: The candidates stood in Dublin Harbour, South Londonderry, South Down and South Tyrone.)
Independent Nationalist	3
Independent Unionist	1 (Note: Candidate Thomas Sloan stood in Belfast South.)
Healyite Nationalist	1 (Note: Candidate Tim Healy stood in North Louth.)
Liberal Party	1 (Note: Candidate William Huston Dodd stood in North Tyrone.)
Labour Representation Committee	1 (Note: Candidate William Walker stood in Belfast North.)
Independent Liberal Unionist	1 (Note: Candidate Alexander Carlisle stood in Belfast West.)
Total	123

== County and borough results ==
Party	Leader	Seats					Aggregate votes		
Party	Leader	Total	Gains	Losses	Net	Of total (%)	Total	Of total (%) (Note: Adjusted for multi-member constituencies.)	Change (%)
Irish Unionist	Walter; Long	14	1 (Note: South Dublin.)	3	▼2	15.8	53,438	39.1	▲8.6
Irish Parliamentary	John; Redmond	81	6	1	▲5	80.2	28,292	21.0	▼19.2
Russellite Unionist	Thomas; Russell	2 (Note: North Antrim and South Tyrone.)	New		▲2	2.0	26,183	19.4	New
Liberal Unionist	Joseph; Chamberlain	1 (Note: South Londonderry.)	0	2	▼2	1.0	10,652	7.9	▲6.2
Labour Repr. Cmte.	Keir; Hardie	0	New			—	4,616	3.4	New
Independent; Unionist	—N/a	1	1 (Note: Belfast South.)	0	▲1	1.0	4,450	3.3	▼3.4
Independent; Nationalist	—N/a	0	0	1 (Note: South Louth.)	▼1	—	3,931	2.9	▲0.5
Liberal	Henry Campbell-Bannerman	1 (Note: North Tyrone.)	0	0	Steady	1.0	2,966	2.2	▲0.2
Independent Liberal Unionist	—N/a	0	0	0	Steady	—	153	0.1	▼1.1
Healyite Nationalist	Tim; Healy	1 (Note: North Louth.)	0	3	▼3	1.0	0	0.0	▼14.8
Total		101			0	100.0	131,419	100.0	0.0
Registered voters, and turnout							164,049 (Note: Electorate in contested constituencies. The total electorate was 686,661.)	82.1	▲21.2

=== Popular vote ===
Popular vote
Irish Unionist	39.1%
IPP	21.0%
Russellite	19.4%
Liberal Unionist	7.9%
Labour R. C.	3.4%
Ind. Unionist	3.3%
Ind. Nationalist	2.9%
Liberal	2.2%
Ind. LU	0.1%

Popular vote (alliances)
Con-LU	47.0%
IPP	21.0%
Russellite	19.4%
Labour R. C.	3.4%
Ind. Unionist	3.3%
Ind. Nationalist	2.9%
Liberal	2.2%
Ind. LU	0.1%

=== Parliament seats ===
Parliamentary seats
IPP	80.2%
Irish Unionist	15.8%
Russellite	2.0%
Liberal Unionist	1.0%
Ind. Unionist	1.0%
Healyite Nat.	1.0%
Liberal	1.0%

Parliamentary seats (alliances)
IPP	80.2%
Con-LU	16.8%
Russellite	2.0%
Ind. Unionist	1.0%
Healyite Nat.	1.0%
Liberal	1.0%

== Dublin University constituency result ==
1906 general election: Dublin University (2 seats)
Party	Candidate	Votes	%	±%
Irish Unionist	Edward Carson	Unopposed		
Irish Unionist	James Campbell	Unopposed		
Irish Unionist hold				
Irish Unionist gain from Liberal Unionist				

== See also ==
- 1906 United Kingdom general election in England
- 1906 United Kingdom general election in Scotland
- 1906 United Kingdom general election in Wales
- List of United Kingdom Parliament constituencies (1885–1918) by region
- History of Ireland (1801–1923)
