= East Down (UK Parliament constituency) =

Parliamentary constituency in the United Kingdom, 1885–1922

- Former county constituency for the House of Commons
- County: County Down

1885–1922
- Seats: 1
- Created from: County Down; Downpatrick
- Replaced by: Down

East Down was a United Kingdom parliamentary constituency in Ireland. It returned one Member of Parliament (MP) to the House of Commons of the United Kingdom from 1885 to 1922, on the electoral system of first past the post.

== Politics ==
The constituency had an anti-unionist majority at the 1918 general election, but its support was split between Nationalist and Sinn Féin candidates. An attempt at a limited electoral pact broke down in this constituency. This produced a minority Unionist win.

== Boundaries ==
From 1801 to 1885, County Down returned two MPs to the House of Commons of the United Kingdom sitting at the Palace of Westminster, with separate representation for the parliamentary boroughs of Downpatrick and Newry. Under the Redistribution of Seats Act 1885, Downpatrick ceased to exist as a parliamentary borough and the parliamentary county was divided into four divisions: North Down, East Down, West Down, and South Down.

Under the Redistribution of Seats (Ireland) Act 1918, Newry ceased to exist as a parliamentary borough, and the parliamentary county gained the additional division of Mid Down. Sinn Féin contested the 1918 general election on an abstentionist platform that instead of taking up any seats at Westminster, they would establish a revolutionary assembly in Dublin. All MPs elected to Irish seats were invited to participate in the First Dáil convened in January 1919, but no members outside of Sinn Féin did so.

The Government of Ireland Act 1920 established the Parliament of Northern Ireland, which came into operation in 1921. The representation of Northern Ireland in the Parliament of the United Kingdom was reduced from 30 MPs to 13 MPs, taking effect at the 1922 United Kingdom general election. At Westminster, the five divisions of County Down were replaced by a two-member county constituency of Down. An eight-seat constituency of Down was created for the House of Commons of Northern Ireland, which formed the basis in republican theory for representation in the Second Dáil.

1885–1918	The baronies of Dufferin, Kinelarty, Lecale Lower and Lecale Upper, and so much of the barony of Castlereagh Upper, except for the parishes or parts of parishes of Comber and Knockbreda.
1918–1922	The rural district of Downpatrick, exclusive of the district electoral divisions of Ballynahinch, Kilmore and Leggygowan; the part of the rural district of Kilkeel which consists of the district electoral divisions of Bryansford, Fofanny and Maghera; and the part of the rural district of Banbridge which consists of the district electoral divisions of Ballyward, Crossgar and Leitrim.

== Members of Parliament ==
James Craig, MP from 1906 to 1918, later served as Prime Minister of Northern Ireland from 1921 to 1940.

Election	Member	Party
1885	Richard Ker	Irish Conservative
1886	Richard Ker	Irish Conservative
1890 b	James Alexander Rentoul	Irish Conservative
1892	James Alexander Rentoul	Irish Unionist
1895	James Alexander Rentoul	Irish Unionist
1900	James Alexander Rentoul	Irish Unionist
1902 b	James Wood	Russellite Unionist
1906	James Craig	Irish Unionist
Jan. 1910	James Craig	Irish Unionist
Dec. 1910	James Craig	Irish Unionist
1918	David Reid	Irish Unionist
1922	constituency abolished	

== Elections ==
=== Elections in the 1880s ===
1885 general election: East Down
Party	Candidate	Votes	%	±%
Irish Conservative	Richard Ker	Unopposed		
Irish Conservative win (new seat)				

1886 general election: East Down
Party	Candidate	Votes	%	±%
Irish Conservative	Richard Ker	5,093	66.5	N/A
Irish Parliamentary	Henry McGrath	2,561	33.5	New
Majority		2,532	33.0	N/A
Turnout		7,654	78.1	N/A
Registered electors		9,805		
Irish Conservative hold		Swing	N/A	

=== Elections in the 1890s ===
By-election 1890: East Down
Party	Candidate	Votes	%	±%
Irish Conservative	James Alexander Rentoul	Unopposed		
Irish Conservative hold				

1892 general election: East Down
Party	Candidate	Votes	%	±%
Irish Unionist	James Alexander Rentoul	Unopposed		
Irish Unionist hold				

1895 general election: East Down
Party	Candidate	Votes	%	±%
Irish Unionist	James Alexander Rentoul	Unopposed		
Irish Unionist hold				

=== Elections in the 1900s ===
1900 general election: East Down
Party	Candidate	Votes	%	±%
Irish Unionist	James Alexander Rentoul	Unopposed		
Irish Unionist hold				

1902 by-election: East Down
Party	Candidate	Votes	%	±%
Russellite Unionist	James Wood	3,576	51.0	New
Irish Unionist	Robert Hugh Wallace	3,429	49.0	N/A
Majority		147	2.0	N/A
Turnout		7,005	85.6	N/A
Registered electors		8,184		
Russellite Unionist gain from Irish Unionist		Swing	N/A	

1906 general election: East Down
Party	Candidate	Votes	%	±%
Irish Unionist	James Craig	4,011	54.6	N/A
Russellite Unionist	James Wood	3,341	45.4	N/A
Majority		670	9.2	N/A
Turnout		7,352	91.1	N/A
Registered electors		8,072		
Irish Unionist hold		Swing	N/A	

=== Elections in the 1910s ===
January 1910 general election: East Down
Party	Candidate	Votes	%	±%
Irish Unionist	James Craig	4,028	56.9	+2.3
Liberal	James Wood	3,054	43.1	−2.3
Majority		974	13.8	+4.6
Turnout		7,082	89.7	−1.4
Registered electors		7,895		
Irish Unionist hold		Swing	+2.3	

December 1910 general election: East Down
Party	Candidate	Votes	%	±%
Irish Unionist	James Craig	4,110	63.0	+6.1
Liberal	James Williamson	2,412	37.0	−6.1
Majority		1,698	26.0	+12.2
Turnout		6,522	82.6	−7.1
Registered electors		7,895		
Irish Unionist hold		Swing	+6.1	

1918 general election: East Down
Party	Candidate	Votes	%	±%
Irish Unionist	David Reid	6,007	42.3	−20.7
Irish Parliamentary	Michael J. Johnston	4,362	30.4	New
Sinn Féin	Russell McNabb	3,876	27.3	New
Majority		1,645	11.9	−14.1
Turnout		14,245	79.8	−2.8
Registered electors		17,846		
Irish Unionist hold		Swing		

== Sources ==
- Leigh Rayment's Historical List of MPs – Constituencies beginning with "D" (part 3)
- Walker, Brian M., ed. (1978). Parliamentary Election Results in Ireland, 1801–1922. Dublin: Royal Irish Academy. ISBN 0901714127.
- Stenton, M.; Lees, S., eds. (1978). Who's Who of British members of parliament: Volume II 1886–1918. The Harvester Press.
- Stenton, M.; Lees, S., eds. (1979). Who's Who of British members of parliament: Volume III 1919–1945. The Harvester Press.
