= 1899 North Antrim by-election =

UK Parliamentary by-election

The February 1899 North Antrim by-election was held on 25 February 1899. The by-election was held following the resignation of the previous member Hugh McCalmont who was a member of the Irish Unionist Party. It was won unopposed by the Irish Unionist Party candidate William Moore.

1899 North Antrim by-election
Party	Candidate	Votes	%	±%
Irish Unionist	William Moore	Unopposed		
Registered electors				
Irish Unionist hold				
