= Henry Clark (Northern Irish politician) =

Politician from the U.K

Henry Maitland Clark (11 April 1929 – 24 March 2012) was a Northern Irish colonial administrator and politician.

== Background ==
Relatives of James Chichester-Clark, Clark's family had been settled in Upperlands in County Londonderry for generations, where they owned a substantial linen mill. Clark, the younger brother of sailor and writer Wallace Clark, was educated at Shrewsbury School, Trinity College Dublin and Trinity Hall, Cambridge. He served with the Colonial Service on coming down from Cambridge and was appointed becoming a District Officer in Tanganyika, where he later served as District Commissioner.

== Parliament ==
In 1959 Clark resigned from the Colonial Service to enter Parliament as Ulster Unionist MP for Antrim North. Throughout Clark's time in Parliament, the Ulster Unionists received the Conservative whip, though retaining an independent identity and Council, and Clark sat on the Government, and later Opposition, benches with Conservative MPs from Great Britain. Clark chaired the Conservative MPs' East Africa Committee in 1963-65 and was a part of the British Parliamentary delegation to the Council of Europe and the Western European Union from 1962 to 1965.

Clark's background in the Colonial Service and his abiding interest in East Africa led to his appointment as an electoral observer. He led the British delegation observing the election in Uganda in 1965 and was a member of the Commonwealth delegation observing the Mauritius election in 1967.

== Defeat ==
At the 1970 general election, Clark lost his seat to Rev Ian Paisley of the Protestant Unionist Party. He became a wine merchant in 1972, giving up the business in 1976. From 1977 he was Assistant Controller of the Council for Small Industries in Rural Areas.

He married Penelope (died 1994), daughter of Group Captain Nicolas Tindal-Carill-Worsley of County Donegal, and they had three children: Christabel (born 1973, married Dario Sbrocca), Camilla (born 1975, married Alasdair Spink) and Jamie (born 1979, married Kate Sinton). He had 9 grandchildren: Caterina Sbrocca, Ettore Sbrocca, Penelope Anne Mary Spink, Hugo Joseph Spink, Honor Christabel Spink, Matilda Rose India Spink, Henry Ludovic Spink, Thomas Henry Clark and Martha Iris Clark. In later life he lived in Tisbury, Wiltshire, where he died on 24 March 2012.

Parliament of the United Kingdom
Preceded by Hon. Phelim O'Neill	MP for Antrim North; 1959–1970	Succeeded by Rev. Ian Paisley
