= 1906 North Armagh by-election =

UK Parliamentary by-election

The 1906 North Armagh by-election was held on 16 November 1906. The by-election was held due to the death of the incumbent Irish Unionist MP, Edward James Saunderson. It was won by the Irish Unionist candidate William Moore.

North Armagh By-Election 16 November 1906
Party	Candidate	Votes	%	±%
Irish Unionist	William Moore	4,228	74.69	N/A
Ind. Unionist	Lindsay Crawford	1,433	25.31	New
Majority		2,795	49.38	N/A
Turnout		7,555	74.93	N/A
Irish Unionist hold		Swing	N/A	
