= 1952 North Antrim by-election =

UK Parliamentary by-election

The 1952 North Antrim by-election was held on 27 October 1952. It was held due to the resignation of the incumbent Ulster Unionist MP, Sir Hugh O'Neill. The seat was retained by his son, Phelim O'Neill, who was unopposed as the Unionist candidate.

== Result ==
1952 North Antrim by-election
Party	Candidate	Votes	%	±%
UUP	Phelim O'Neill	Unopposed		
Registered electors				
UUP hold				
