= Department of Agriculture and Technical Instruction for Ireland =

Pre-independence government body in Ireland

Agriculture and Technical Industies (Ireland) Act 1899
- Act of Parliament
- Parliament of the United Kingdom
- Long title: An Act to make Provision for the lighting, cleansing, and watching of Cities, Towns Corporate, and Market Towns, in Ireland, in certain Cases.
- Citation: 62 and 63 Vict, c. 50
- Territorial extent: Ireland

Dates
- Royal assent: 9 August 1899

Text of statute as originally enacted

The Department of Agriculture and Technical Instruction for Ireland (DATI) was established under the Agriculture and Technical Industies (Ireland) Act 1899. It was led by Horace Plunkett.

In July 1896, the Recess Committee issued a report, of which Plunkett was the author, containing accounts of the systems of state aid to agriculture and technical instruction in foreign countries. This report, and the growing influence of Plunkett, who became a member of the Irish Privy Council in 1897, led to the passing of the Agriculture and Technical Industies (Ireland) Act 1899 establishing the Department of Agriculture and Technical Instruction (DATI) for Ireland, of which the Chief Secretary for Ireland was to be President ex officio. Plunkett was appointed vice-president, a position of de facto leadership. He guided the policy and administration of the DATI in its first seven critical years.

The DATI worked:

- to improve the quality of crops and livestock
- to deal with animal and plant disease
- to encourage fishing and planting of forests
- to collect statistics on many aspects of Irish life.

By 1914, DATI had 138 instructors travelling the country, informing farmers about new methods in agriculture, horticulture and poultry-keeping.

It had been intended that the vice-president should be responsible for the DATI in the House of Commons, but an extensively signed memo, supported by the Agricultural Council, prayed that Plunkett might not be removed from office, and at the government's request he continued to direct the policy of the DATI without a seat in Parliament.

When the Liberal Party took office in 1906, James Bryce, the new Chief Secretary for Ireland, asked Plunkett to remain at the head of the department he had created.

Ultimately the DATI ceased to work harmoniously with the Irish Agricultural Organisation Society (IAOS), wrecking Plunkett's hopes, and the Irish Parliamentary Party made a determined effort to drive him from office, moving a resolution to that effect in the House of Commons in 1907. The government gave way, and although Plunkett was re-elected president of the IAOS in the summer of 1907, he retired from office in the DATI. From the year 1900 the DATI had made an annual grant of about £4,000 to the IAOS, but in 1907 the new vice-president of the DATI, T. W. Russell, who had previously been a member of the Unionist administration, withdrew it. Nonetheless, many continued to be inspired by Plunkett's vision and to establish creamery cooperatives around the country.

Under the Ministers and Secretaries Act 1924, the administration of DATI was divided:

- business and functions relating to Technical Instruction only to the Department of Education;
- the Fisheries Branch to the Department of Fisheries; and
- the parts not related to the business and functions relating to Fisheries and Technical Instruction to the Department of Lands and Agriculture
