= Redmond Barry (lord chancellor) =

Irish lawyer and judge

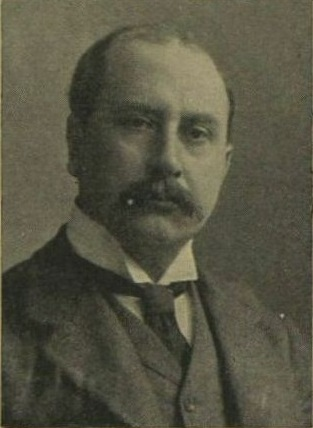
Redmond Barry

Redmond John Barry (14 September 1866 – 11 July 1913) was an Irish lawyer and judge who became Lord Chancellor of Ireland; his promising career was cut short by his early death.

== Biography ==
He was the third son of Patrick Barry of Hill View, Cork. He was educated at the Royal University of Ireland, was called to the Bar in 1888 and became Queen's Counsel in 1899. He was not related to the statesman John Redmond, although as he cheerfully admitted, the widespread belief that he was Redmond's kinsman did no harm to his career. He married Ethel Pyke of Southport in 1895.

Barry was appointed Solicitor-General for Ireland in the Liberal government of 1905, and on 6 March 1907 he was elected in a by-election as Member of Parliament for North Tyrone. He was promoted to Attorney-General for Ireland in 1909 then raised to the bench as Lord Chancellor of Ireland in 1911, serving until his death at age 46. His professional skill is shown by the detailed answers he gave to the House of Commons in 1910, which show both the width of the problems he had to deal with and his efficiency in solving them.

Maurice Healy in his memoir The Old Munster Circuit praises Barry warmly as a gifted and cultivated lawyer, who left behind him more affectionate memories than any other member of the Irish Bar.

His son, Sir Patrick Barry, became an English High Court judge.

== Arms ==
Coat of arms of Redmond Barry
Notes Granted 14 May 1912 by Nevile Rodwell Wilkinson, Ulster King of Arms. Crest A wolf's head couped Sable charged with a portcullis Argent. Torse Of the colours. Escutcheon Barry of six Argent and Gules a portcullis Sable nailed and chained Or on a canton Ermine a wolf's head erased Sable. Motto Boutez En Avant

Parliament of the United Kingdom
Preceded by William Huston Dodd	Member of Parliament for Tyrone North; 1907–1911	Succeeded by Thomas Russell
Legal offices
Preceded by James Campbell	Solicitor-General for Ireland; 1905–1909	Succeeded by Charles O'Connor
Preceded by Richard Cherry	Attorney-General for Ireland; 1909–1911	Succeeded by Charles O'Connor
Political offices
Preceded by Sir Samuel Walker, Bt	Lord Chancellor of Ireland; 1911–1913	Succeeded by Sir Ignatius O'Brien
