= 1890 East Down by-election =

UK Parliamentary by-election

The 1890 East Down by-election was a parliamentary by-election held for the United Kingdom House of Commons constituency of East Down on 25 March 1890. The vacancy arose because of the resignation of the sitting member, Richard Ker of the Conservative party, who had been in Parliament since 1884. Only one candidate was nominated, James Alexander Rentoul, a Conservative member of London County Council who had roots in the area, who was elected unopposed.
