= James Alexander Rentoul =

Irish politician and judge (1854–1919)

James Alexander Rentoul (1854 – 12 August 1919) was an Irish-born British judge and politician.

== Life ==
=== Early life ===
James Alexander Rentoul was born in Manorcunningham, County Donegal, the eldest son of Reverend Alexander Rentoul. He was educated at Queen's College Galway, Queen's College, Belfast, and the Universities of Berlin and Brussels.

=== Career ===
He was a Presbyterian minister for a number of years before being called to the bar in 1884. The novelist Erminda Rentoul Esler was his sister.

He was a member of London County Council before being elected Conservative Member of Parliament for East Down at a by-election in 1890.

Rentoul was a strong opponent of the Irish language; at Westminster in July 1900 he stated that the Irish language had no value and should not receive any support by the public education system, he stated that Irish-speaking children should be taught exclusively through English and expressed a desire for the Irish language to become extinct.

He remained as member for the constituency until was appointed a Judge of the City of London Court and the Central Criminal Court in November 1901.

=== Assessments and death ===
According to The Times, Judge Rentoul was 'patient and kind in the performance of his duties, but it would be useless to pretend that he was a success on the Bench'. On a number of occasions his decisions were severely criticised by the Court of Criminal Appeal, one being described as 'unusual and extraordinary'. He resigned shortly before his death.

He was described as a 'kindly and loving man' and a brilliant after-dinner speaker. In Who's Who, he listed his only recreation as 'Reading Who's Who'.

He was Vice President of Listooder Ploughing Society in the 1900s.

He died in London in 1919. His son, Gervais Rentoul, became Member of Parliament for Lowestoft.

== Endnotes ==
Parliament of the United Kingdom
Preceded by Richard Ker	Member of Parliament for Down East; 1890 – 1902	Succeeded by James Wood
