= 1916 South Tyrone by-election =

UK Parliamentary by-election

The 1916 South Tyrone by-election was held on 28 February 1916. The by-election was held due to the death of the incumbent Irish Unionist MP, Andrew Horner. It was won by the Irish Unionist candidate William Coote, who was unopposed.
