= South Tyrone (UK Parliament constituency) =

Parliamentary constituency in the United Kingdom, 1885–1922

- Former county constituency for the House of Commons

1885–1922
- Seats: 1
- Created from: Dungannon and County Tyrone
- Replaced by: Fermanagh and Tyrone

South Tyrone was a UK Parliament constituency in Ireland which returned one Member of Parliament from 1885 to 1922, using the first past the post electoral system.

== Boundaries ==
From 1801 to 1885, County Tyrone returned two MPs to the House of Commons of the United Kingdom sitting at the Palace of Westminster, with separate representation for the parliamentary borough of Dungannon. Under the Redistribution of Seats Act 1885, Dungannon ceased to exist as a parliamentary borough and the parliamentary county was divided into four divisions: North Tyrone, Mid Tyrone, East Tyrone and South Tyrone.

Under the Redistribution of Seats (Ireland) Act 1918, following a boundary commission review, the parliamentary county lost a seat, leading to an expansion of the territory of South Tyrone. Sinn Féin contested the 1918 general election on an abstentionist platform in its election manifesto pledging that instead of taking up any seats at Westminster, they would establish an assembly in Dublin. All MPs elected to Irish seats were invited to participate in the First Dáil convened in January 1919, but no members outside of Sinn Féin did so, with South Tyrone's William Coote listed on the roll as "as láthair" [absent].

1885–1918	The baronies of Clogher and Dungannon Lower, and that part of the barony of Dungannon Middle consisting of the parishes of Clonfeacle and Donaghmore.
1918–1922	The rural district of Clogher, that part of the rural district of Cookstown consisting of the district electoral divisions of The Sandholes and Stewartstown, that part of the rural district of Dungannon not contained in the North East Tyrone constituency, that part of the rural district of Omagh consisting of the district electoral divisions of Carryglass, Derrybard, Dervaghroy, Draughton, Fallaghearn, Fintona, Seskinore and Tattymoyle, and the urban district of Dungannon.

The Government of Ireland Act 1920 established the Parliament of Northern Ireland, which came into operation in 1921. The representation of Northern Ireland in the Parliament of the United Kingdom was reduced from 30 MPs to 13 MPs, taking effect at the 1922 United Kingdom general election. At Westminster, the three divisions of County Tyrone and the two divisions of County Fermanangh were replaced by a two-member county constituency of Fermanagh and Tyrone. An eight-seat constituency of Fermanagh and Tyrone was created for the House of Commons of Northern Ireland, which formed the basis in republican theory for representation in the Second Dáil after the 1921 election. Three Sinn Féin representatives sat as TDs for the constituency, two of whom also represented constituencies in Southern Ireland.

== Members of Parliament ==
Election	Member	Party
1885	William O'Brien	Nationalist
1886	Thomas Russell	Liberal Unionist
1902	Thomas Russell	Russellite Unionist
1907	Thomas Russell	Liberal
Jan 1910	Andrew Horner	Irish Unionist
1916 (b)	William Coote	Irish Unionist
May 1921	William Coote	Ulster Unionist
1922	constituency abolished	

== Elections ==
=== Elections in the 1880s ===
General election 5 December 1885: Tyrone South
Party	Candidate	Votes	%	±%
Irish Parliamentary	William O'Brien	3,435	50.4	
Irish Conservative	Somerset Henry Maxwell	3,382	49.6	
Majority		53	0.8	
Turnout		6,817	88.2	
Registered electors		7,725		
Irish Parliamentary win (new seat)				

General election 17 July 1886: Tyrone South
Party	Candidate	Votes	%	±%
Liberal Unionist	Thomas Russell	3,481	50.7	+1.1
Irish Parliamentary	William O'Brien	3,382	49.3	−1.1
Majority		99	1.4	N/A
Turnout		6,863	88.8	+0.6
Registered electors		7,725		
Liberal Unionist gain from Irish Parliamentary		Swing	+1.1	

=== Elections in the 1890s ===
General election 13 July 1892: Tyrone South
Party	Candidate	Votes	%	±%
Liberal Unionist	Thomas Russell	3,468	52.8	+2.1
Liberal	Thomas Alexander Dickson	3,096	47.2	New
Majority		372	5.6	+4.2
Turnout		6,564	92.8	+4.0
Registered electors		7,070		
Liberal Unionist hold		Swing		

General election 24 July 1895: Tyrone South
Party	Candidate	Votes	%	±%
Liberal Unionist	Thomas Russell	3,239	51.5	−1.3
Ind. Nationalist	Thomas Shillington	3,046	48.5	New
Majority		193	3.0	−2.6
Turnout		6,285	93.4	+0.6
Registered electors		6,730		
Liberal Unionist hold		Swing		

=== Elections in the 1900s ===
General election 4 October 1900: Tyrone South
Party	Candidate	Votes	%	±%
Liberal Unionist	Thomas Russell	2,499	48.0	−3.5
Ind. Nationalist	Edward Charles Thompson	2,409	46.0	−2.5
Ind. Unionist	Robert James Howard	303	5.8	New
Majority		90	2.0	−1.0
Turnout		5,211	83.8	−9.6
Registered electors		6,220		
Liberal Unionist hold		Swing		

General election 25 January 1906: Tyrone South
Party	Candidate	Votes	%	±%
Russellite Unionist	Thomas Russell	2,954	52.5	+4.5
Irish Unionist	Andrew Horner	2,671	47.5	−0.5
Majority		283	5.0	N/A
Turnout		5,625	94.0	+10.2
Registered electors		5,982		
Russellite Unionist gain from Liberal Unionist		Swing		

=== Elections in the 1910s ===
General election 20 January 1910: Tyrone South
Party	Candidate	Votes	%	±%
Irish Unionist	Andrew Horner	3,054	52.4	+4.9
Liberal	Thomas Russell	2,770	47.6	−4.9
Majority		284	4.8	N/A
Turnout		5,824	96.1	+2.1
Registered electors		6,059		
Irish Unionist gain from Russellite Unionist		Swing		

General election 8 December 1910: Tyrone South
Party	Candidate	Votes	%	±%
Irish Unionist	Andrew Horner	2,962	52.7	+0.3
Liberal	Robert Nathaniel Boyd	2,662	47.3	−0.3
Majority		300	5.4	+0.6
Turnout		5,624	92.8	−3.3
Registered electors		6,059		
Irish Unionist hold		Swing	+0.3	

By-election 28 February 1916: Tyrone South
Party	Candidate	Votes	%	±%
Irish Unionist	William Coote	Unopposed		
Registered electors		6,434		

General Election 14 December 1918: South Tyrone
Party	Candidate	Votes	%	±%
Irish Unionist	William Coote	10,616	56.9	+4.2
Sinn Féin	Denis McCullough	5,437	29.1	New
Ind. Nationalist	John Skeffington	2,602	13.9	New
Majority		5,179	27.8	N/A
Turnout		18,655	83.0	−9.8
Irish Unionist hold		Swing		

== See also ==
- List of UK Parliament Constituencies in Ireland and Northern Ireland
- Redistribution of Seats (Ireland) Act 1918
- List of MPs elected in the 1918 United Kingdom general election
- List of Dáil Éireann constituencies in Ireland (historic)
- Members of the 1st Dáil
