= Charles Connor (MP) =

Irish Unionist MP

Charles Cunningham Connor (c. 1840 – 10 February 1914) was an Irish Unionist MP for North Antrim.

Connor was educated at the Royal Academical Institution, Belfast and Queen's University Belfast, and was a businessman prior to entering Parliament, as well as an alderman of Belfast City Council. Between 1889 and 1891 he was Mayor of Belfast (the last before the post was upgraded to Lord Mayor). He was elected to Parliament at the general election of 1892, but did not stand in 1895.

Parliament of the United Kingdom
Preceded by Sir Charles Lewis, Bt	Member of Parliament for North Antrim; 1892 – 1895	Succeeded by Hugh McCalmont
