= Vassall Tribunal =

1963 British public inquiry

The Vassall Tribunal was a public inquiry undertaken in 1963 by the British government in the wake of the John Vassall affair. Vassall, a civil servant working in the Admiralty, had been revealed the previous year to be a Soviet spy, and considerable criticism had been levelled at the security arrangements. The tribunal was established to investigate the claims and determine whether any blame could be laid on officials or ministers.

At first, the inquiry was to be conducted by three senior civil servants, the Permanent Under-Secretary of the Treasury, the Treasury Solicitor, and the Second Secretary at the Treasury. Before it could begin, letters were discovered in Vassall's possession from Tam Galbraith, who had been Civil Lord of the Admiralty. Vassall had been Galbraith's junior private secretary, but some people suggested that it was odd that a minister would communicate by post with an official of his own department, and there was considerable speculation of impropriety in the press.

Given Vassall's homosexuality, which had become known, it began to be put around that he and Galbraith were involved with each other and that Galbraith might have shielded him from discovery. The committee of civil servants investigated the correspondence and declared it innocent, but the verdict was not universally accepted. Eventually, the Prime Minister was compelled to open a wider inquiry, conducted by three jurists, the Viscount Radcliffe, Mr Justice Barry, and Milner Holland QC. The inquiry determined that Vassall had not been helped or favoured by any of his seniors.

The inquiry was controversial in some quarters for requiring journalists to reveal the sources that they claimed for their allegations and for having prosecuted two journalists, Brendan Mulholland of the Daily Mail and Reg Foster of the Daily Sketch, who refused and were jailed for contempt of court, Lord Radcliffe sentencing Mulholland for six months and Foster for three months.
