= 1887 North Antrim by-election =

UK parliamentary by-election

The 1887 North Antrim by-election was a parliamentary by-election held for the United Kingdom House of Commons constituency of North Antrim on 11 February 1887. The sitting member, Edward Macnaghten of the Conservatives, had been elevated to the House of Lords as a Lord of Appeal in Ordinary.

In the ensuing by-election three candidates were nominated: Charles Lewis of the Conservative Party (UK) was elected, with 3,858 votes; S C McElroy, a Gladstone Liberal, received 2,526; and W. A. Traill (Independent Unionist) received 424.

North Antrim by-election, 1887
Party	Candidate	Votes	%	±%
Irish Conservative	Charles Lewis	3,858	56.7	−13.2
Liberal	Samuel Craig McElroy	2,526	37.1	+7.0
Ind. Unionist	William Atcheson Traill	424	6.2	New
Majority		1,332	19.6	−20.1
Turnout		6,808	71.6	+0.8
Registered electors		9,505		
Irish Conservative hold		Swing	-10.1	

McElroy was a leading tenants' rights campaigner. A Presbyterian minister from Portrush, who wrote to Lord Hartington, leader of the Liberal Unionists, seeking advice on whom to vote for, was urged to support the Conservative:

"it is probable that my opinions agree more closely with those of Mr McElroy than those of Mr Lewis. But the question of the Union, especially in an Irish constituency, I took to be of supreme importance, and it would be a severe blow to the Unionist cause if on account of any minor issue whatever the opinion of such a constituency as North Antrim upon Mr Gladstone's Irish policy should appear to be doubtful."

The Nationalists in the constituency, who supported McElroy, had hoped for his election through a split of the Unionist vote between Lewis and Traill, but as The Times observed, the voters "have not been tempted from the path of loyalty by the lure held out to them by the enemies of their landlords". Lewis sat for the constituency until the 1892 general election, but did not seek re-election.
