= Andrew Horner =

Irish Unionist politician (1863–1916)

Member of Parliament for South Tyrone
- In office 20 January 1910 – 26 January 1916
- Preceded by: Thomas Russell
- Succeeded by: William Coote

Personal details
- Born: Andrew Long Horner; 1863
- Died: 26 January 1916 (aged 52–53)

Andrew Long Horner (1863 – 26 January 1916) was an Irish Unionist politician and Member of Parliament (MP) in the House of Commons of the United Kingdom of Great Britain and Ireland.

He was elected for the South Tyrone constituency initially as a Liberal Unionist at the January 1910 general election and re-elected at the December 1910 general election. He died in office in January 1916, and the by-election for his seat was won by the Irish Unionist candidate William Coote, who stood unopposed.

Parliament of the United Kingdom
Preceded by Thomas Russell	Member of Parliament for South Tyrone; Jan. 1910–1916	Succeeded by William Coote
