= Patrick Barry (judge) =

British High Court judge (1898–1972)

Sir Patrick Redmond Joseph Barry, MC (4 September 1898 – 6 May 1972) was a British barrister and High Court judge.

== Biography ==
Patrick Barry was the son of Redmond Barry, Lord Chancellor of Ireland, and of Ethel Barry, née Pyke. He was educated at Downside School, Royal Military College, Sandhurst, and Balliol College, Oxford. He joined the Irish Guards in 1917, and served with the 1st Battalion, Irish Guards in France and Germany from 1918 and 1919 as a lieutenant and adjutant, and transferred to the Reserve of Officers in 1919. He was awarded the Military Cross for his wartime service.

Barry was called to the Bar in 1923 and joined the Northern Circuit. Nicknamed "Paddy Barry", he had a large general practice. In 1929, he contested Bolton for the Liberal Party at that year's general election, coming in last. He became a King's Counsel in 1938. In 1939, he was recalled to the Irish Guards, was captain and adjutant from 1939 to 1940, transferring to the General Staff in 1940. He was promoted lieutenant-colonel in 1942.

He was Recorder of Oldham from 1942 to 1950 and was a Judge of Appeal of the Isle of Man from 1946 to 1950. He was also deputy chairman of the Wiltshire quarter sessions from 1964 to 1971. In 1946, he was elected a bencher of the Inner Temple.

In 1950, Barry was appointed a Justice of the High Court, and received the customary knighthood; he was assigned to the Queen's Bench Division, and was successful in the trial of both criminal and civil cases.

In addition, he was Chairman of the Advisory Council on the Treatment of Offenders from 1958 to 1966 and a member of the Vassall Tribunal from 1962 to 1963. He retired from the bench in 1966.

== Family ==
Barry married Ruth Marion Agnew in 1933; they had one daughter.
