= Reg Foster =

British journalist

Reginald William Foster (23 July 1904 – 29 December 1999) was a British journalist who specialised in crime reporting and, because he covered fires as well, was known as "Fireman Foster". He was the first reporter to arrive at the scene of the fire that destroyed the Crystal Palace in 1936. In 1963, Foster, then a freelance reporter for the Daily Sketch, and fellow reporter Brendan Mulholland, of the Daily Mail, known as the 'Silent Journalists', were sentenced to prison terms for refusing to reveal their sources to the Vassall Tribunal.

After training at the South London Press, he joined the staff at the Daily Mail (1924 to 1932) before going on to join the Daily Herald, where, on 31 May 1940, he broke the news of "one of the most glorious feats of British arms", the Dunkirk evacuation.

While at the Herald, he also wrote Dover Front (1941), published by Searchlight Books, the short-lived imprint of Secker & Warburg co-ordinated by T. R. Fyvel and George Orwell. He later served as a corporal at the South East Asia Command (SEAC).

After the war, Foster joined the News Chronicle, covering notorious criminal cases such as those of the acid bath murderer John George Haigh (1949), the serial killer John Christie and the Derek Bentley case (1952). Following the closure of the Chronicle in 1960, Foster freelanced for a while at the Sunday Dispatch, Sunday Express, Daily Mirror and the Daily Sketch in 1963.

In 1963, after covering the Vassall spy trial as a freelance reporter for the Sketch, Foster, then 58, was jailed for 3 months for refusing to disclose his source, and subsequently released after 61 days. At the same trial, Brendan Mulholland, of the Daily Mail, was given a six-month sentence.

Foster then worked at the London office of the Yorkshire Evening Post before retiring.
