= North Tyrone (UK Parliament constituency) =

Parliamentary constituency in the United Kingdom, 1885–1918

- Former county constituency for the House of Commons

1885–1918
- Seats: 1
- Created from: County Tyrone
- Replaced by: North West Tyrone

North Tyrone was a UK parliamentary constituency in Ireland. It returned one Member of Parliament (MP) to the British House of Commons from 1885 to 1918.

Prior to the 1885 United Kingdom general election the area was part of the County Tyrone constituency. From the dissolution of Parliament in 1918 North Tyrone became part of the new North-West Tyrone constituency.

Notably, from 1895 until its abolition in 1918 the seat elected four Liberal MPs in succession by narrow margins; they were the only Liberals elected anywhere in Ireland during this time period, and remain the last MPs from a mainland party other than the Conservatives and their allies to represent a seat in the UK Parliament on the island of Ireland.

== Boundaries ==
This constituency comprised the northern part of County Tyrone, consisting of the baronies of Strabane Lower and West Omagh, and that part of the barony of Strabane Upper consisting of the townlands of Aghalane, Ballynasollus, Bradkeel, Carnargan, Corickmore, Craigatuke, Cruckaclady, Dergbrough, Eden Back, Eden Fore, Eden Mill, Glencoppogagh, Glenga, Glashygolgan, Landahussy Lower, Landahussy Upper, Learden Lower, Learden Upper, Letterbrat, Lislea North, Lislea South, Lisnacreaght, Meenagarragh, Meenagorp, Tullagherin and Tullynadall in the parish of Upper Bodoney.

== Members of Parliament ==
Election	Member	Party
1885	Lord Ernest Hamilton	Conservative
1892	Lord Frederick Spencer Hamilton	Conservative
1895	Charles Hare Hemphill	Liberal
1906	William Huston Dodd	Liberal
1907	Redmond Barry	Liberal
1911	Thomas Wallace Russell	Liberal
1918	constituency abolished	

== Elections ==
=== Elections in the 1880s ===
General election 28 November 1885: Tyrone North
Party	Candidate	Votes	%	±%
Irish Conservative	Ernest Hamilton	3,345	53.4	
Irish Parliamentary	John Dillon	2,922	46.6	
Majority		423	6.8	
Turnout		6,267	92.0	
Registered electors		6,810		
Irish Conservative win (new seat)				

General election 10 July 1886: Tyrone North
Party	Candidate	Votes	%	±%
Irish Unionist	Ernest Hamilton	3,219	52.9	−0.5
Liberal	James Owens Wylie	2,867	47.1	New
Majority		352	5.8	−1.0
Turnout		6,086	89.4	−2.6
Registered electors		6,810		
Irish Unionist hold		Swing	−0.5	

=== Elections in the 1890s ===
General election 15 July 1892: Tyrone North
Party	Candidate	Votes	%	±%
Irish Unionist	Frederick Hamilton	3,045	50.4	−2.5
Liberal	James Brown Dougherty	2,996	49.6	+2.5
Majority		49	0.8	−5.0
Turnout		6,041	93.2	+3.8
Registered electors		6,481		
Irish Unionist hold		Swing	−2.5	

Charles Hemphill

General election 18 July 1895: Tyrone North
Party	Candidate	Votes	%	±%
Liberal	Charles Hemphill	2,948	50.8	+1.2
Irish Unionist	William Wilson	2,857	49.2	−1.2
Majority		91	1.6	N/A
Turnout		5,805	94.1	+0.9
Registered electors		6,171		
Liberal gain from Irish Unionist		Swing	+1.2	

=== Elections in the 1900s ===
1900 general election: Tyrone North
Party	Candidate	Votes	%	±%
Liberal	Charles Hemphill	2,869	50.5	−0.3
Irish Unionist	Daniel James Wilson	2,814	49.5	+0.3
Majority		55	1.0	−0.6
Turnout		5,683	92.1	−2.0
Registered electors		6,168		
Liberal hold		Swing	−0.3	

Dodd

1906 general election: Tyrone North
Party	Candidate	Votes	%	±%
Liberal	William Huston Dodd	2,966	50.1	−0.4
Irish Unionist	Denis Henry	2,957	49.9	+0.4
Majority		9	0.2	−0.8
Turnout		5,923	95.8	+3.7
Registered electors		6,181		
Liberal hold		Swing	−0.4	

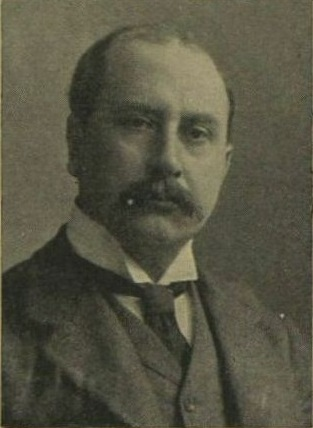
Redmond Barry

1907 Tyrone North by-election
Party	Candidate	Votes	%	±%
Liberal	Redmond Barry	3,013	50.1	0.0
Irish Unionist	Denis Henry	3,006	49.9	0.0
Majority		7	0.2	0.0
Turnout		6,019	96.6	+0.8
Registered electors		6,230		
Liberal hold		Swing	0.0	

=== Elections in the 1910s ===
General election 26 January 1910: Tyrone North
Party	Candidate	Votes	%	±%
Liberal	Redmond Barry	3,238	50.8	+0.7
Irish Unionist	Emerson Herdman	3,136	49.2	−0.7
Majority		102	1.6	+1.4
Turnout		6,374	97.0	+1.2
Registered electors		6,572		
Liberal hold		Swing	+0.7	

General election 14 December 1910: Tyrone North
Party	Candidate	Votes	%	±%
Liberal	Redmond Barry	3,170	51.1	+0.3
Irish Unionist	Arthur John Hamilton	3,038	48.9	−0.3
Majority		132	2.2	+0.6
Turnout		6,208	94.5	−2.5
Registered electors		6,572		
Liberal hold		Swing	+0.3	

1911 North Tyrone by-election
Party	Candidate	Votes	%	±%
Liberal	Thomas Russell	3,104	50.1	−1.0
Irish Unionist	Emerson Herdman	3,086	49.9	+1.0
Majority		18	0.2	−2.0
Turnout		6,190	94.5	0.0
Registered electors		6,551		
Liberal hold		Swing	−1.0	
