= Peter Kerr-Smiley =

Northern Irish Member of Parliament

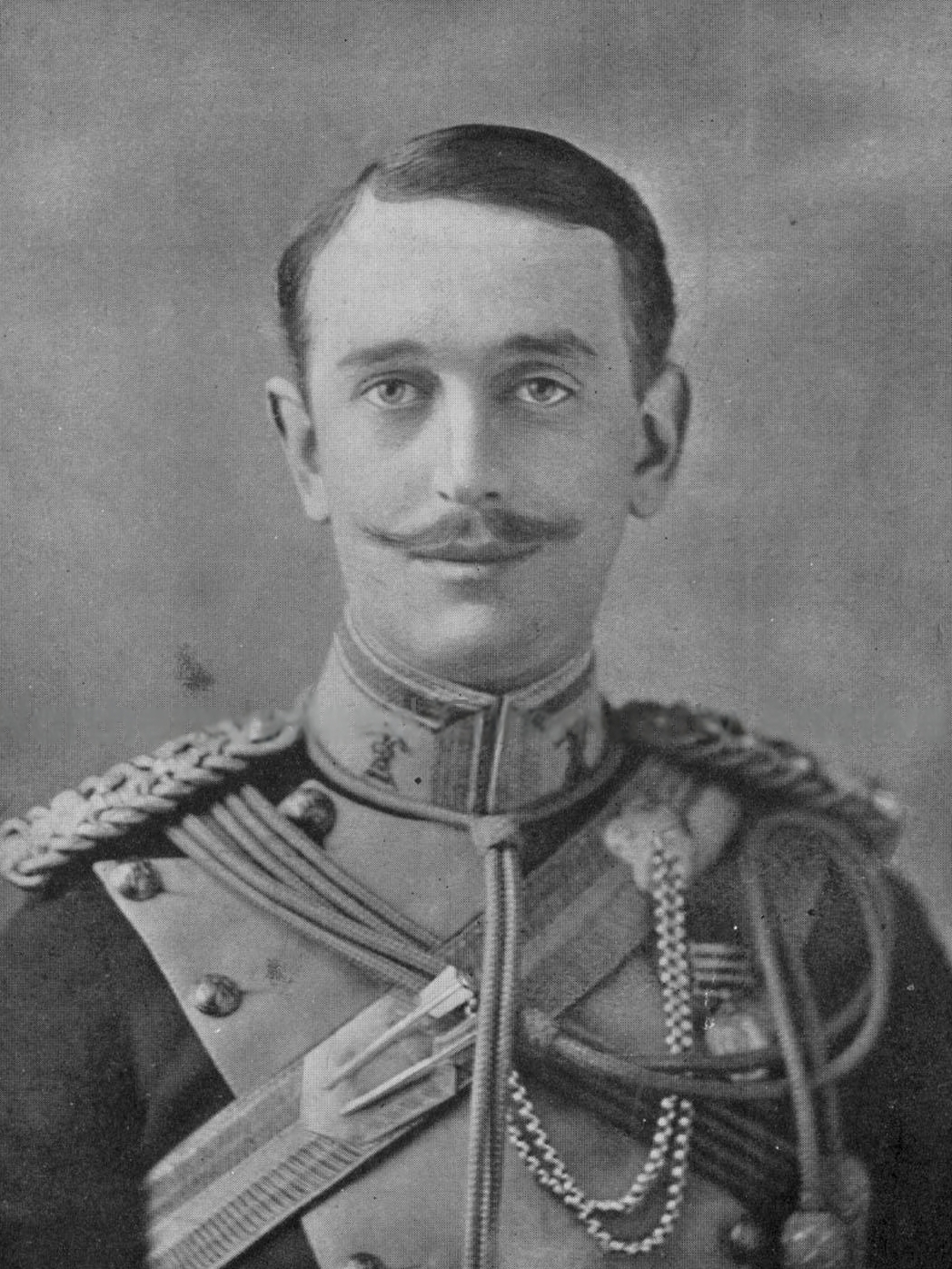
- Kerr-Smiley in 1910

Member of Parliament for North Antrim
- In office 1910–1922
- Preceded by: Robert Glendinning
- Succeeded by: Constituency abolished

Personal details
- Born: Peter Kerr Smiley; 22 February 1879 Larne
- Died: 23 June 1943 (aged 64)
- Party: Unionist
- Spouse: Maud Simpson
- Children: 2
- Parent: Sir Hugh Smiley, 1st Baronet (father)
- Education: Eton College
- Alma mater: Trinity Hall, Cambridge

Military service
- Rank: Major
- Unit: 21st Lancers; Royal Irish Rifles
- Battles/wars: Second Boer War

Peter Kerr Kerr-Smiley (22 February 1879 – 23 June 1943) was a Northern Irish Member of Parliament.

== Family background and early life ==
He was born at Larne as Peter Kerr Smiley, the second son of Sir Hugh Smiley, 1st Baronet. He was educated at Eton College and Trinity Hall, Cambridge. He commissioned a second lieutenant in the 21st Lancers on 5 May 1900, promoted to lieutenant on 15 December 1900, and from 1901 to 1902 served on the staff during the Second Boer War in South Africa. After the end of hostilities in May 1902, he left Cape Town the following month. He resigned his commission in 1905, but later reached the rank of Major in the 14th Battalion Royal Irish Rifles.

=== Brother-in-law to Ernest Simpson ===
In 1905 he adopted the surname of Kerr-Smiley, and the same year married Maud Simpson, daughter of Ernest L. Simpson, a British shipbroker, and sister of Ernest Aldrich Simpson, a significant figure in the 1936 Abdication Crisis. They had two children:

- Cyril Hugh Kerr-Smiley (1906–1980; married Agnes Sorell-Cameron)
- Elizabeth Maud Kerr-Smiley (1907–2006; married architectural historian Christopher Hussey)

== Political career ==
Kerr-Smiley was a Unionist in politics, and Chairman of the Belfast newspaper The Northern Whig. He unsuccessfully stood for South Down at the 1906 general election.

=== Member of Parliament for North Antrim ===
He was elected for North Antrim in January 1910 and represented the constituency until 1922, in its 1950 recreation a constituency much later achieving significant prominence for decades by its MP the Rev. Dr. Ian Paisley.

Kerr-Smiley's London house was at 31 Belgrave Square, and he was a member of the Carlton Club, the Marlborough Club and the Cavalry Club.

Parliament of the United Kingdom
| Preceded by Robert Glendinning | Member of Parliament for North Antrim; 1910–1922 | Constituency abolished |
