= Russellite Unionist =

- Leader: Sir Thomas Russell
- Founded: February 1904
- Dissolved: 1910
- Split from: Liberal Unionists
- Ideology: Land reform Irish Unionism; Liberalism

The Russellite group were the followers of Thomas Wallace Russell, an Irish political leader of the early twentieth century.

Russell was the Liberal Unionist MP for South Tyrone. He and some followers left the party in February 1904. They favoured a policy of compulsory land purchase. Dod's Parliamentary Companion regarded them as ex-Liberal Unionists who had joined the Liberal Party, although Russell's two Parliamentary colleagues had been first elected as Independent Unionists and they did not seek re-election as Liberals in 1906.

At by-elections and in the 1906 United Kingdom general election Russellite candidates contested elections in Ulster seats as Independent Unionists. F.W.S. Craig's compilation of election results for 1906 includes them with the Liberals, but gives them a footnote.

== MPs in the 1900-1906 Parliament ==
- Thomas Wallace Russell, South Tyrone elected at the 1900 United Kingdom general election
- James Wood, East Down elected at a by-election 5 February 1902
- Edward Mitchell, North Fermanagh elected at a by-election 20 March 1903

== MPs elected in 1906 ==
Map showing the vote share received by Russelite candidates (left), and the party of the winning candidate by constituency (right). The map is limited to Ulster, as Russelites did not run outside of the province.

- Robert Glendinning, North Antrim
- Thomas Wallace Russell, South Tyrone

Russell became clearly associated with the Liberal Party in the 1906-1910 Parliament. Glendinning was regarded by Dod's Parliamentary Companion as an Independent Liberal. No new Russellite candidates stood in by-elections.

In the January 1910 general election, Glendinning retired and Russell lost his seat as a Liberal candidate. In 1911 he was elected as a Liberal in the North Tyrone by-election.
