= Robert Glendinning =

British politician (1844–1928)

Robert Graham Glendinning PC (5 April 1844 – 8 June 1928) was a businessman and the Member of Parliament (MP) for North Antrim from 1906 to 1910. He was director of Glendinning. M'Leish and Co., Ltd.; Larabeg Weaving Co., Ltd.; Co. Down Weaving Co., Ltd.: W. R. Nelson & Co., Ltd.; Barron & Co., Ltd., Belfast.

Glendinning's great-grandchildren include Robin and Will Glendinning.

Parliament of the United Kingdom
Preceded by William Moore	Member of Parliament for North Antrim; 1906 – Jan 1910	Succeeded by Peter Kerr-Smiley
