= Down Recorder =

Northern Irish newspaper

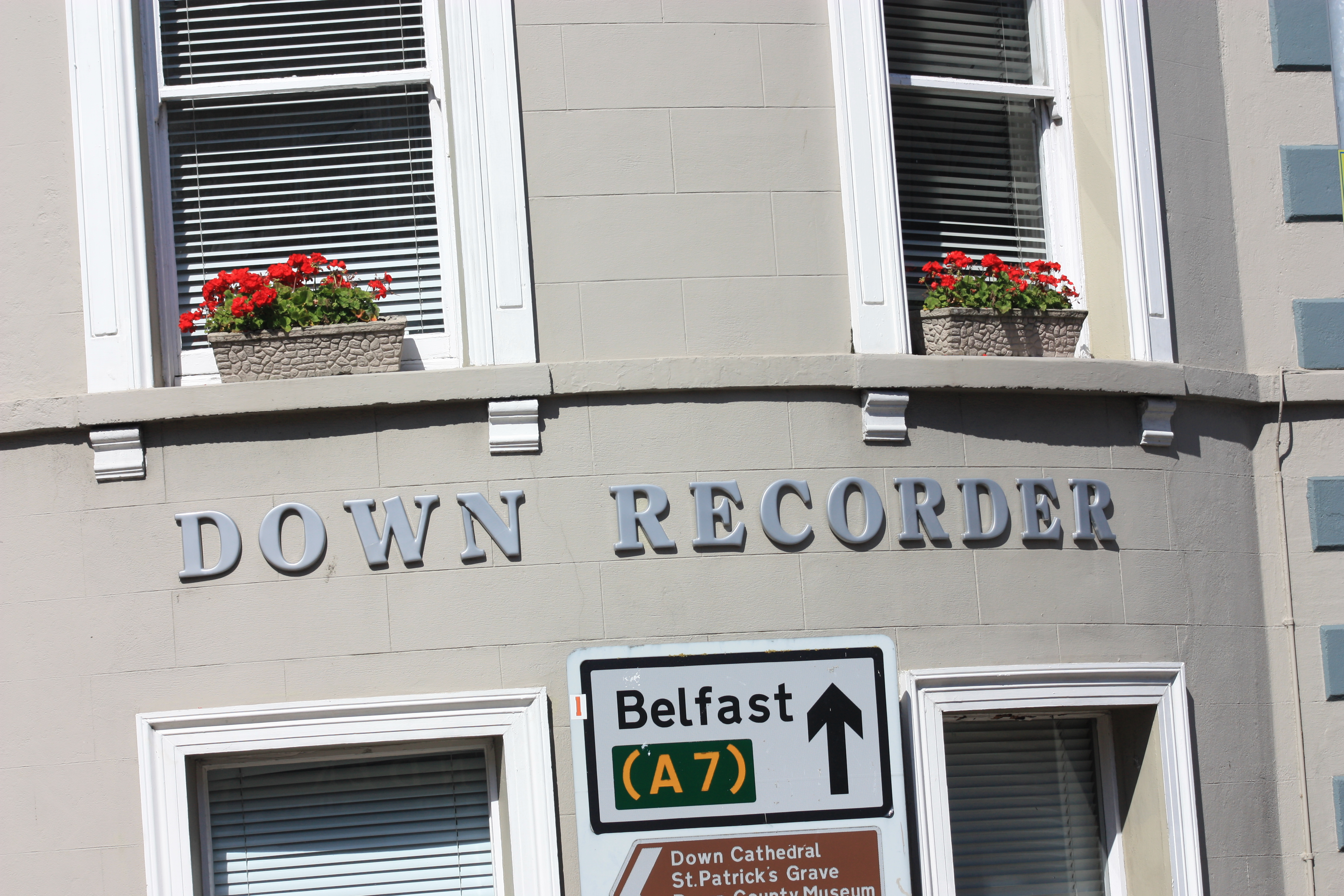
Down Recorder office, Church Street, Downpatrick, August 2009

The Down Recorder was a weekly newspaper published in Downpatrick, County Down, Northern Ireland, every Wednesday. It was owned by W.Y. Crichton & Co.

== History ==
The paper, then known as The Downpatrick Recorder, was first published on 31 December 1836. It was the first newspaper to be published in the town, and was owned by Conway Pilson, the son of a local historian.

At that time, news from London and abroad came by boat to Belfast in the evening. However, the boat rested for 12 hours at Newry, 44 kilometres (27 mi) from Downpatrick. Pilson organised a horse relay to bring the news from there so he could publish it before any rival papers.

The paper was renamed The Down Recorder in 1878 to reflect its wider circulation.

In 1964, the production moved from the original offices in Irish Street to a former Post Office building on Church Street. In 1966, the actual printing was moved to more modern facilities in Portadown.

The final edition was published on 12 November 2025.
