= 1907 North Tyrone by-election =

UK Parliamentary by-election

← 1906	8 March 1907	Jan. 1910 →

Candidate	Barry	Henry
Party	Liberal	Irish Unionist
Popular vote	3,013	3,006
Percentage	50.1%	49.9%
MP before election
William Huston Dodd
Liberal
Subsequent MP
Redmond Barry
Liberal

The 1907 North Tyrone by-election was held on 8 March 1907. The by-election was held due to the incumbent Liberal MP, William Huston Dodd, being appointed as a Judge of the High Court of Justice in Ireland 1907–24. It was narrowly won by the Liberal candidate Redmond Barry in a very high turnout.

== Result ==
1907 Tyrone North by-election
Party	Candidate	Votes	%	±%
Liberal	Redmond Barry	3,013	50.1	0.0
Irish Unionist	Denis Henry	3,006	49.9	0.0
Majority		7	0.2	0.0
Turnout		6,019	96.6	+0.8
Liberal hold		Swing	0.0	
