= Hugh McCalmont =

Anglo-Irish soldier, politician, and horseman

Major-General Sir Hugh McCalmont KCB CVO
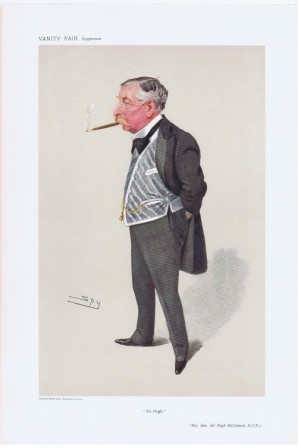
- Born: 9 February 1845; Dublin, Ireland
- Died: 2 May 1924 (aged 79); London, England
- Military career
- Allegiance: United Kingdom
- Branch: British Army
- Rank: Major-General
- Commands: 8th Division
- Conflicts: Red River Rebellion; Third Anglo-Ashanti War; Russo-Turkish War; South African War; Second Anglo-Afghan War; Anglo-Egyptian War; Nile Expedition
- Awards: Knight Commander of the Order of the Bath; Commander of the Royal Victorian Order

Major-General Sir Hugh McCalmont KCB CVO (9 February 1845 – 2 May 1924) was an Anglo-Irish British Army officer, politician, and horseman. He was elected as an Irish Unionist Member of Parliament for North Antrim in 1895, resigning in 1899 by becoming Steward of the Manor of Northstead.

== Early life and education ==
Hugh McCalmont was born in Dublin, the eldest son of James McCalmont (of Abbeylands, Belfast) and Emily Anne Martin. He was educated at Eton and Christ Church, Oxford.

He was the half-nephew of author Violet Florence Martin and the composer Robert "Ballyhooly" Martin, who composed the Killaloe March, both younger than him, being children of his maternal grandfather's second marriage.

== Career ==
McCalmont was commissioned into the 6th Dragoon Guards in 1865. He saw service in the Red River Rebellion in 1870, the Third Anglo-Ashanti War in 1873 and the Russo-Turkish War in 1877. McCalmont also took part in the South African War in 1879, the Second Anglo-Afghan War in 1879 and the Anglo-Egyptian War in 1882 as well as the Nile Expedition in 1884.

In 1884 he became aide-de-camp to General Wolseley. He was elected as an Ulster Unionist Member of Parliament for North Antrim in 1895 but resigned in 1899 by becoming Steward of the Manor of Northstead.

He was commanding the troops in the Cork district, when on 1 April 1902 he became General Officer Commanding 8th Division within Third Army Corps in Ireland. He served temporarily as commander of the Third Army Corps, and thus acting Commander of the Forces in Ireland, from December 1902 to March 1903, during the absence for a royal tour of India of the Commander, the Duke of Connaught and Strathearn.

In 1907 he was given the colonelcy of the 7th Queen's Own Hussars, a position he held until his death in 1924.

McCalmont lived at Abbeylands, a two-storey Victorian house in Whiteabbey, near Belfast, until it was set on fire by Suffragettes in 1914 causing £20,000 of damage. Unionist leader, Edward Carson, had declared against votes for women, meanwhile his Ulster Volunteer Force (UVF) had been drilling troops at Abbeylands House. In protest the Suffragettes burnt the building to the ground on 27 March 1914, complaining that they were being imprisoned while the UVF were gun running and preparing for civil war.

== Personal life ==
In 1885, he married the Hon. Rose Elizabeth Bingham, daughter of John Charles Robert Bingham, 4th Baron Clanmorris of Newbrook. His son, Dermot McCalmont (1887–1968), inherited a fortune from his second cousin, Harry McCalmont, and was the owner of race horse The Tetrarch.

Parliament of the United Kingdom
Preceded by Charles Cunningham Connor	Member of Parliament for North Antrim; 1895–1899	Succeeded by William Moore
Military offices
Preceded by	General Officer Commanding the 8th Division; 1902–1903	Succeeded by Sir Reginald Pole-Carew
