= William Atcheson Traill =

Irish engineer

William Atcheson Traill (1844 – 5 July 1933) was an Irish engineer. Born at Ballylough, in County Antrim, William Atcheson Traill was educated in private schools and graduated from Trinity College Dublin with a degree in Engineering in 1865 and a Master's in 1873. In 1868, he joined the Geological Survey of Ireland, becoming an expert on water supply. In 1881 he left, and founded the Portrush, Bushmills, and Giant's Causeway Railway and Tramway Company with his brother Anthony. This operated the world's first electrical railway, and was funded by capital raised from friends and investors, including Sir Walter Siemens and Lord Kelvin. Traill devised and patented a conduit system of burying the live rail in a pipe with electrical contact. The expected goods trade never took off, and the line remained as a summer tourist railway until its closure 1949 . In February 1887, he ran in a by-election in North Antrim as an Independent Unionist, coming in third. He married three times, and met his third wife, Nora Woodhouse, in 1895 when he rescued her from drowning.

In 1990, the Northern Bank issued a banknote bearing a portrait of Traill.
