= William Huston Dodd =

Irish politician and judge

William Huston Dodd

William Huston Dodd (1844-17 March 1930) was an Irish politician, barrister and judge. He held the Crown office of Irish Serjeant-at-law, sat in the House of Commons of the United Kingdom as member for North Tyrone, and served as a judge of the High Court of Justice in Ireland from 1907 to 1924. There is a sympathetic account of his personality in the celebrated legal memoir The Old Munster Circuit by Maurice Healy.

== Biography ==
He was born in Rathfriland, County Down, the only son of Robert Dodd. He was educated at the Royal Belfast Academical Institution and Queen's University, Belfast where he took his bachelor's degree and then a master's degree. He entered the Middle Temple in 1871 and was called to the Irish Bar in 1873, becoming Queen's Counsel in 1884. In 1878 he married Ellen Hunter, eldest daughter of Stewart Hunter of Coleraine, who died in 1916; they had no children. He was a long-standing member of the Statistical and Social Inquiry Society of Ireland, and served as its President 1894–1896.

== Career ==
Dodd was throughout his life a loyal member of the Liberal Party, and this hampered his career, as the Liberals were in opposition during precisely the years when he could have hoped to be appointed to the Bench. He did become Third Serjeant-at-law, which was a Crown office, in 1892. He stood for Parliament, unsuccessfully, in North Antrim in 1892 and South Londonderry in 1895. In 1906 he reached the House of Commons at last and was made a High Court judge the following year. According to Maurice Healy, his failure to reach the Bench until he was over sixty caused a good deal of friction with his colleagues, since he had a high opinion of his own legal ability, and was unwilling to defer to his colleagues, some of whom were considerably younger than himself.

During the transitional arrangements following the Anglo-Irish Treaty of 1921, Dodd, like most of his colleagues, remained in office as a High Court judge. However Hugh Kennedy, the new Chief Justice of Ireland, had an extremely low opinion of the judges of the old regime and was determined to remove them en bloc. In Dodd's case this was achieved tactfully, since the Courts of Justice Act 1924 imposed an age limit of 72, and Dodd, who was 80, was deemed to have automatically retired. He died in 1930.

== Character ==
Maurice Healy in his memoirs describes Dodd as a man of rough appearance and manner (his nickname was "the mechanic"), which concealed a great deal of kindness; he was rather tactless, but had the gift of being able to take a joke against himself. His main fault was vanity, and while Healy thought him a fairly good judge, his very high estimate of his own talents was apparently not shared by his colleagues. Healy admired him for never compromising on his politics, at the cost of delaying his elevation to the Bench by at least a decade. His late arrival on the Bench led him to clash with his fellow judges: according to Maurice Healy, Sir Peter O'Brien, the Lord Chief Justice of Ireland, once reminded him pointedly in open Court that he was the junior judge (although O'Brien could fairly have pointed out that Dodd was the younger man by a year or two as well). Fortunately, according to Healy, one of Dodd's virtues was magnanimity, and he was incapable of bearing a grudge.

Parliament of the United Kingdom
Preceded by Charles Hemphill	Member of Parliament for North Tyrone; 1906 – 1907	Succeeded by Redmond Barry
