= Erminda Rentoul Esler =

Erminda Rentoul Esler (1852? – 1924) was an Irish novelist who wrote romances and fiction expressing Presbyterian moral values. She was well known in the late 19th and early 20th centuries for her novels and short stories, and was published in the Cornhill Magazine.

== Biography ==
She was born in Manorcunningham, County Donegal, daughter of the Reverend Alexander Rentoul, and had seven brothers and sisters. Before going to the Queen's University of Belfast she received some of her education in Nîmes and Berlin. After marrying doctor and science writer Robert Esler she lived in Belfast and London.

Her novels have rural settings in Ireland or England. The Wardlaws (1896), the story of an Irish landowning family whose financial troubles raise moral questions about how to live one's life, is considered one of her best works. Other fiction includes The Way of Transgressors (1890), The Way they loved at Grimpat (1894), 'Mid Green Pastures (1895), Youth at the Prow (1898), Awakening of Helena Thorpe (1901), and The Trackless Way (1904), a particularly religious book, subtitled "The story of a man's quest for God." She published as E. Rentoul Esler.
