= Emerson Herdman =

Unionist Politician in Northern Ireland

Sir Emerson Crawford Herdman KBE (2 January 1869 – 10 February 1949) was a unionist politician in Northern Ireland.

Herdman studied at Uppingham School and the University of Oxford before becoming the director of a linen company in Northern Ireland. From 1920 to 1922, he served as Lord Lieutenant of Donegal, and he was knighted in 1921. He was elected as a member of the Senate of Northern Ireland in 1923 and served until his death in 1949.

At the start of World War II, Herdman spoke to Éamon de Valera about obtaining "unity of command" and to ask if Éire would enter the war in return for an end to partition. Herdman appears to have been acting on behalf of Craigavon, but de Valera rebuffed him.

Honorary titles
Preceded by Lord Arran	Lord Lieutenant of Donegal; 1920–1922	Office abolished
