= Sir Thomas Russell, 1st Baronet =

British politician

Sir Thomas Wallace Russell, Bt MP
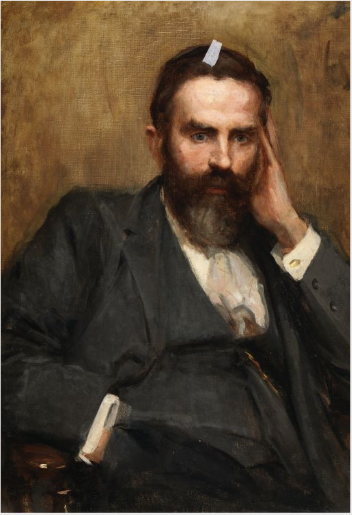

Vice-President of the Department of Agriculture and Technical Instruction for Ireland
- In office 1907–1918
- Monarchs: Edward VII (to 1910); George V (1910–1918)
- Preceded by: Horace Plunkett
- Succeeded by: Office abolished

Member of Parliament for North Tyrone
- In office 6 October 1911 – July 1918
- Preceded by: Redmond Barry
- Succeeded by: Constituency abolished

Member of Parliament for South Tyrone
- In office July 1886 – January 1910
- Preceded by: William O'Brien
- Succeeded by: Andrew Horner

Personal details
- Born: 28 February 1841 Cupar, Fife, Scotland
- Died: 2 May 1920 (aged 79) Terenure, County Dublin, Ireland
- Party: Liberal; 1910–1918
- Other political affiliations: Russellite Unionist; 1904–1910 Liberal Unionist; 1886–1904 Liberal before 1885
- Spouse: Mary McKinney
- Children: 3
- Committees: Member of the Privy Council of Ireland (from 15 February 1907)
- Awards: Created a baronet, 18 July 1917

Sir Thomas Wallace Russell, 1st Baronet MP (28 February 1841 – 2 May 1920) was an Irish politician and outspoken campaigner for agrarian reform. Born in Cupar, Fife, he moved to County Tyrone at the age of eighteen. He served as secretary and parliamentary agent of the Irish temperance movement and became well known as an anti-alcohol campaigner and as the proprietor of a temperance hotel in Dublin.

== Career ==
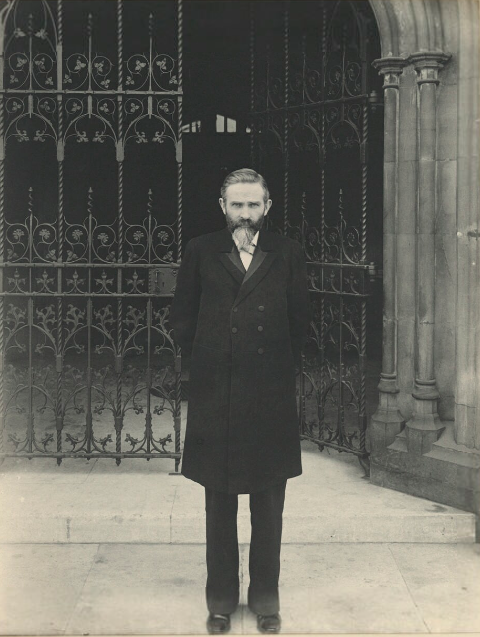
circa 1900

He unsuccessfully contested Preston in 1885 as a Liberal. However, he opposed William Ewart Gladstone's Home Rule policy and was elected to the House of Commons of the United Kingdom of Great Britain and Ireland as a Liberal Unionist in 1886 for South Tyrone. He served between 1895 and 1900 as Parliamentary Secretary to the Local Government Board in the Unionist administration of Lord Salisbury.

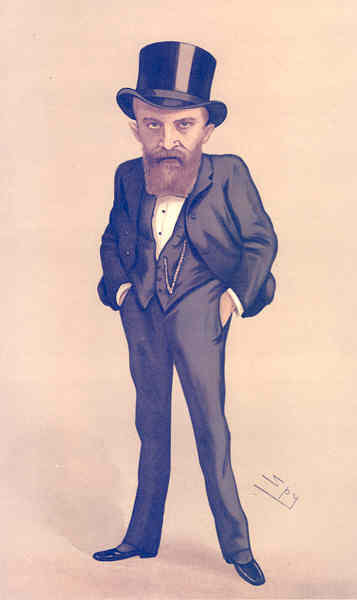
"loyal and patriotic" Russell as caricatured by Spy (Leslie Ward) in Vanity Fair, March 1888

However, Russell's views on Home Rule underwent a change around the turn of the century and he gradually became a critic of Unionist policies in Ireland. From 1900 put himself at the head of the Farmers and Labourers Union, an Ulster tenant-farmer protest movement demanding compulsory land purchase, similar to the land and labour movement in the south. His 1901 book Ireland and the Empire was an attack on the Irish agrarian system. From 1902 to 1903 he was a key Ulster farmer representative at the Dublin "Land Conference" which resulted in the passing of the Land Purchase (Ireland) Act 1903. This defused the Protestant tenant farmers' revolt.

Russell continued to represent Tyrone South in Parliament. In 1906, supported by Lindsay Crawford and his Independent Orange Order while at the same acknowledging his debt to Catholic tenant farmers, he was re-elected as an "Independent Unionist", one of several candidates referred to as "Russellite Unionist".

Russell was vice-president of the Department of Agriculture and Technical Instruction for Ireland (DATI), in which capacity he displaced Horace Plunkett as head of the Department in 1907. He disapproved of Plunkett's cooperative Irish Agricultural Organisation Society involving itself in the affairs of farmers, and ended DATI's help for the society.

He rejoined the Liberal Party and stood as a Liberal candidate at the January 1910 general election, when he lost his seat to the Unionist Andrew Horner. Russell does not appear to have contested the December 1910 general election, but in 1911 he won a by-election in Tyrone North, a seat he held until the constituency was abolished in 1918.

Russell was sworn of the Irish Privy Council in 1908 and created a Baronet, of Olney in the County of Dublin, in 1917. He retired from politics in 1918 and died in Dublin on 2 May 1920, aged 79, when the baronetcy became extinct.

== Arms ==
Coat of arms of Sir Thomas Russell, 1st Baronet
Arms of Russell of Olney	Notes Granted 24 August 1917 by George James Burtchaell, Deputy Ulster King of Arms. Crest A demi-goat salient Gules supporting a garb Or. Torse Of the colours. Escutcheon Argent a lion rampant Gules on a chief wavy Vert a bezant between two garbs Or. Motto I Face The Dawn

== Notes ==
Parliament of the United Kingdom
Preceded by William O'Brien	Member of Parliament for Tyrone South; 1886 – 1910	Succeeded by Andrew Horner
Preceded by Redmond Barry	Member of Parliament for Tyrone North; 1911 – 1918	Constituency abolished
Political offices
Preceded by Sir Balthazar Foster	Parliamentary Secretary to the Local Government Board; 1895 – 1900	Succeeded by John Lawson
Baronetage of the United Kingdom
New creation	Baronet (of Olney); 1917 – 1920	Extinct
