= List of United Kingdom Parliament constituencies in Ireland =

Ireland became part of the United Kingdom of Great Britain and Ireland under the Act of Union 1800 from 1 January 1801. On 6 December 1922, the Irish Free State left the United Kingdom, with Northern Ireland remaining as part of the United Kingdom of Great Britain and Northern Ireland.

== Summary of constituencies and Members of Parliament ==
Key to categories: BC - Borough constituencies, CC - County constituencies, UC - University constituencies, Total C - Total constituencies, BMP - Borough Members of Parliament, CMP - County Members of Parliament, UMP - University Members of Parliament.

Period	BC	CC	UC	Total C	BMP	CMP	UMP	Total MPs
1801–1832	33	32	1	66	35	64	1	100
1832–1870	33	32	1	66	39	64	2	105
1870–1885	31	32	1	64	39	64	2	103
1885–1918	15	85	1	101	16	85	2	103
1918–1922	20	80	3	103	21	80	4	105
1922–1950	4	5	1	10	4	8	1	13
1950–1983	4	8	0	12	4	8	0	12
1983–1997	4	13	0	17	4	13	0	17
1997–present	4	14	0	18	4	14	0	18

=== Electoral effect of the Act of Union 1800 ===
There were 300 seats in the Irish House of Commons in 1800, elected in 150 2-member constituencies: 32 county constituencies, 117 borough constituencies, and one university constituency. Under the Act of Union 1800, Ireland was divided into constituencies to elect 100 MPs for elections to the United Kingdom Parliament. From 1801, there were 32 two-member county constituencies, 2 two-member borough constituencies, 31 one-member borough constituencies, and 1 university constituency.

1801–1832 In cases where both a borough and county area have the same name and seats of each type exist simultaneously Borough, City or County (as appropriate) are included in the constituency name in the list below, unless there is a later county seat of the same name in which case County is omitted. Borough constituencies: 2 two member, 31 single member; seats 35. University constituency: 1 single member seat. County constituencies: 32 two member; seats 64. Constituencies: 66. Members of Parliament: 100.

=== Irish Reform Act 1832 ===
1832–1870 Overall representation for Ireland increased from 100 to 105 with additional seats in Belfast, Galway Borough, Limerick City, Waterford City and Dublin University gained a second seat. Borough constituencies defined with minor changes by the Parliamentary Boundaries (Ireland) Act 1832. Minor changes in 1868. Borough constituencies: 6 two member, 27 single member; seats 39. University constituency: 1 two member; seats 2. County constituencies: 32 two member; seats 64. Constituencies: 66. Members of Parliament: 105.

=== Cashel and Sligo Disenfranchisement Act 1870 ===
1870–1885 Cashel and Sligo were disenfranchised for corruption in 1870. Borough constituencies: 6 two member, 25 single member; seats 37. University constituency: 1 two member; seats 2. County constituencies: 32 two member; seats 64. Constituencies: 64. Members of Parliament: 103.

=== Redistribution of Seats Act 1885 ===
1885–1918 There was a redistribution of constituencies. All seats were single member, except for Cork City and Dublin University, which continued to return two members. Divisions of a borough or county are given in the list below with the name of the borough or county preceding the name of the division. County division compass point names normally have the direction before the county name i.e. East Antrim. The list below treats such names like the borough equivalents, with the name of the place preceding the compass point, i.e. Antrim East. Borough constituencies: 1 two member, 14 single member; seats 16. University constituency: 1 two member; seats 2. County constituencies: 85 single member seats. Constituencies: 101. Members of Parliament: 103.

=== Redistribution of Seats (Ireland) Act 1918 ===
At the 1918 general election there were 105 Irish seats in the House of Commons of the United Kingdom for the 31st United Kingdom Parliament. This Parliament first met on 4 February 1919 and was dissolved on 26 October 1922. Sinn Féin elected 69 MPs to 73 seats at this election and under Irish Republican theory, regarded the 1918 election as an all-Ireland election for First Dáil, where they sat as Teachtaí Dála (TDs).

1918–1922 There was a redistribution of constituencies. All seats were single member, except for Cork City and Dublin University, which continued to return two members. From 1918 some former constituency names are reused. Such seats are identified by using (1) or (2) after the constituency name. Borough constituencies: 1 two member, 19 single member; seats 21. University constituencies: 1 two member, 2 single member; seats 4. County constituencies: 80 single member seats. Constituencies: 103. Members of Parliament: 105.

=== Government of Ireland Act 1920 ===
The Government of Ireland Act 1920 created two separate Parliaments for Northern Ireland and Southern Ireland respectively. It also decreased the representation for Ireland at Westminster from 105 in total to 13 from Northern Ireland and 33 from Southern Ireland.

=== Independence of the Irish Free State (1922) ===
In 1921, the Anglo-Irish Treaty secured independence for the Irish Free State, comprising that part of Ireland not in Northern Ireland, which was to take effect on 6 November 1922. From the 1922 Westminster election, held on 15 November, only the six counties of Northern Ireland were represented in Parliament.

1922–1950 There was a redistribution of constituencies, following the Anglo-Irish Treaty and the establishment of the Irish Free State. Twenty-six of the thirty-two Irish counties ceased to be represented in the United Kingdom Parliament. The remaining six counties formed Northern Ireland. All seats were single member, except for Antrim, Down and Fermanagh & Tyrone. Those three seats elected two members each. Some seats included parts of more than one county. The predominant county when the constituency is created is named in those cases.

- Borough constituencies: 4 single member seats.
- University constituency: 1 single member seat.
- County constituencies: 3 two member, 2 single member; seats 8.
- Constituencies: 10.
- Members of Parliament: 13.

=== Representation of the People Act 1948 ===
1950–1983 There was a redistribution of constituencies. All seats were single member ones from this time and the university constituency was abolished.

- Borough constituencies: 4 single member seats.
- County constituencies: 8 single member seats.
- Constituencies and Members of Parliament: 12.

=== Increase in Northern Ireland ===
The House of Commons (Redistribution of Seats) Act 1979 increased representation for Northern Ireland from 12 to 17.

1983–1997 The historic counties ceased to be relevant to constituency boundaries. Seats first created from 1983 are not allocated to a county.

- Borough constituencies: 4 single member seats.
- County constituencies: 13 single member seats.
- Constituencies and Members of Parliament: 17.

From 1997 There was a redistribution of constituencies.

- Borough constituencies: 4 single member seats.
- County constituencies: 14 single member seats.
- Constituencies and Members of Parliament: 18.

== List of constituencies during the Union with Great Britain ==
Separate creations of a constituency with the same name is noted by (1) and (2).

Constituency	Type	County	Created	Abolished	Notes
Antrim (1)	county	Antrim	1801	1885	2 MPs
Antrim East (1)	county	Antrim	1885	1922	
Antrim Mid	county	Antrim	1885	1922	
Antrim North (1)	county	Antrim	1885	1922	
Antrim South (1)	county	Antrim	1885	1922	
Armagh (1)	county	Armagh	1801	1885	2 MPs
Armagh City	borough	Armagh	1801	1885	
Armagh Mid	county	Armagh	1885	1922	
Armagh North	county	Armagh	1885	1922	
Armagh South	county	Armagh	1885	1922	
Athlone	borough	Westmeath	1801	1885	
Bandon	borough	Cork	1801	1885	
Belfast	borough	Antrim	1801	1885	2 MPs, 1832–85
Belfast Cromac	borough	Antrim	1918	1922	
Belfast Duncairn	borough	Antrim	1918	1922	
Belfast East (1)	borough	Antrim	1885	1918	
Belfast Falls	borough	Antrim	1918	1922	
Belfast North (1)	borough	Antrim	1885	1918	
Belfast Ormeau	borough	Antrim	1918	1922	
Belfast Pottinger	borough	Antrim	1918	1922	
Belfast Shankill	borough	Antrim	1918	1922	
Belfast South (1)	borough	Antrim	1885	1918	
Belfast St Anne's	borough	Antrim	1918	1922	
Belfast Victoria	borough	Antrim	1918	1922	
Belfast West (1)	borough	Antrim	1885	1918	
Belfast Woodvale	borough	Antrim	1918	1922	
Carlow	borough	Carlow	1801	1885	
County Carlow	county	Carlow	1801	1922	2 MPs, 1801–85
Carrickfergus	borough	Antrim	1801	1885	
Cashel	borough	Tipperary	1801	1870	
Cavan	county	Cavan	1801	1885	2 MPs
Cavan East	county	Cavan	1885	1922	
Cavan West	county	Cavan	1885	1922	
Clare	county	Clare	1801	1885	2 MPs
Clare East	county	Clare	1885	1922	
Clare West	county	Clare	1885	1922	
Clonmel	borough	Tipperary	1801	1885	
Coleraine	borough	Londonderry	1801	1885	
Cork City	borough	Cork	1801	1922	2 MPs
County Cork	county	Cork	1801	1885	2 MPs
Cork East	county	Cork	1885	1922	
Cork Mid	county	Cork	1885	1922	
Cork North	county	Cork	1885	1922	
Cork North-East	county	Cork	1885	1922	
Cork South	county	Cork	1885	1922	
Cork South East	county	Cork	1885	1922	
Cork West	county	Cork	1885	1922	
Donegal	county	Donegal	1801	1885	2 MPs
Donegal East	county	Donegal	1885	1922	
Donegal North	county	Donegal	1885	1922	
Donegal South	county	Donegal	1885	1922	
Donegal West	county	Donegal	1885	1922	
Down (1)	county	Down	1801	1885	2 MPs
Down East	county	Down	1885	1922	
Down Mid	county	Down	1918	1922	
Down North (1)	county	Down	1885	1922	
Down South (1)	county	Down	1885	1922	
Down West	county	Down	1885	1922	
Downpatrick	borough	Down	1801	1885	
Drogheda	borough	Louth	1801	1885	
Dublin City	borough	Dublin	1801	1885	2 MPs
Dublin Clontarf	borough	Dublin	1918	1922	
Dublin College Green	borough	Dublin	1885	1922	
County Dublin	county	Dublin	1801	1885	2 MPs
Dublin Harbour	borough	Dublin	1885	1922	
Dublin North	county	Dublin	1885	1922	
Dublin Pembroke	county	Dublin	1918	1922	
Dublin Rathmines	county	Dublin	1918	1922	
Dublin St James's	borough	Dublin	1918	1922	
Dublin St Michan's	borough	Dublin	1918	1922	
Dublin St Patrick's	borough	Dublin	1885	1922	
Dublin St Stephen's Green	borough	Dublin	1885	1922	
Dublin South	county	Dublin	1885	1922	
Dublin University	university	Universities	1801	1922	2 MPs, 1832–1922
Dundalk	borough	Louth	1801	1885	
Dungannon	borough	Tyrone	1801	1885	
Dungarvan	borough	Waterford	1801	1885	
Ennis	borough	Clare	1801	1885	
Enniskillen	borough	Fermanagh	1801	1885	
Fermanagh	county	Fermanagh	1801	1885	2 MPs
Fermanagh North	county	Fermanagh	1885	1922	
Fermanagh South	county	Fermanagh	1885	1922	
Galway Borough	borough	Galway	1801	1918	2 MPs, 1832–85
Galway Connemara	county	Galway	1885	1922	
County Galway	county	Galway	1801	1885	2 MPs
Galway East	county	Galway	1885	1922	
Galway North	county	Galway	1885	1922	
Galway South	county	Galway	1885	1922	
Kerry	county	Kerry	1801	1885	2 MPs
Kerry East	county	Kerry	1885	1922	
Kerry North	county	Kerry	1885	1922	
Kerry South	county	Kerry	1885	1922	
Kerry West	county	Kerry	1885	1922	
Kildare	county	Kildare	1801	1885	2 MPs
Kildare North	county	Kildare	1885	1922	
Kildare South	county	Kildare	1885	1922	
Kilkenny City	borough	Kilkenny	1801	1918	
County Kilkenny	county	Kilkenny	1801	1885	2 MPs
Kilkenny North	county	Kilkenny	1885	1922	
Kilkenny South	county	Kilkenny	1885	1922	
King's County (1)	county	King's	1801	1885	2 MPs
King's County (2)	county	King's	1918	1922	
King's County Birr	county	King's	1885	1918	
King's County Tullamore	county	King's	1885	1918	
Kinsale	borough	Cork	1801	1885	
Leitrim (1)	county	Leitrim	1801	1885	2 MPs
Leitrim (2)	county	Leitrim	1918	1922	
North Leitrim	county	Leitrim	1885	1918	
South Leitrim	county	Leitrim	1885	1918	
Limerick City	borough	Limerick	1801	1918	2 MPs, 1832–85
County Limerick	county	Limerick	1801	1885	2 MPs
Limerick East	county	Limerick	1885	1922	
Limerick West	county	Limerick	1885	1922	
Lisburn	borough	Antrim	1801	1885	
Londonderry (1)	county	Londonderry	1801	1885	2 MPs
Londonderry City	borough	Londonderry	1801	1922	
Londonderry North	county	Londonderry	1885	1922	
Londonderry South	county	Londonderry	1885	1922	
Longford (1)	county	Longford	1801	1885	2 MPs
Longford (2)	county	Lomgford	1918	1922	
Longford North	county	Longford	1885	1918	
Longford South	county	Longford	1885	1918	
Louth (1)	county	Louth	1801	1885	2 MPs
Louth (2)	county	Louth	1918	1922	
Louth North	county	Louth	1885	1918	
Louth South	county	Louth	1885	1918	
Mallow	borough	Cork	1801	1885	
Mayo	county	Mayo	1801	1885	2 MPs
Mayo East	county	Mayo	1885	1922	
Mayo North	county	Mayo	1885	1922	
Mayo South	county	Mayo	1885	1922	
Mayo West	county	Mayo	1885	1922	
Meath	county	Meath	1801	1885	2 MPs
Meath North	county	Meath	1885	1922	
Meath South	county	Meath	1885	1922	
Monaghan	county	Monaghan	1801	1885	2 MPs
Monaghan North	county	Monaghan	1885	1922	
Monaghan South	county	Monaghan	1885	1922	
National University of Ireland	university	Universities	1918	1922	
New Ross	borough	Wexford	1801	1885	
Newry	borough	Down	1801	1918	
Portarlington	borough	Queen's	1801	1885	
Queen's County (1)	county	Queen's	1801	1885	2 MPs
Queen's County (2)	county	Queen's	1918	1922	
Queen's County Leix	county	Queen's	1885	1918	
Queen's County Ossory	county	Queen's	1885	1918	
Roscommon	county	Roscommon	1801	1885	2 MPs
Roscommon North	county	Roscommon	1885	1922	
Roscommon South	county	Roscommon	1885	1922	
Sligo	borough	Sligo	1801	1870	
County Sligo	county	Sligo	1801	1885	2 MPs
Sligo North	county	Sligo	1885	1922	
Sligo South	county	Sligo	1885	1922	
Tipperary	county	Tipperary	1801	1885	2 MPs
Tipperary East	county	Tipperary	1885	1922	
Tipperary Mid	county	Tipperary	1885	1922	
Tipperary North	county	Tipperary	1885	1922	
Tipperary South	county	Tipperary	1885	1922	
Tralee	borough	Kerry	1801	1885	
Tyrone	county	Tyrone	1801	1885	2 MPs
Tyrone East	county	Tyrone	1885	1918	
Tyrone Mid	county	Tyrone	1885	1918	
Tyrone North	county	Tyrone	1885	1918	
Tyrone North-East	county	Tyrone	1918	1922	
Tyrone North-West	county	Tyrone	1918	1922	
Tyrone South	county	Tyrone	1885	1922	
Waterford (1)	county	Waterford	1801	1885	2 MPs
Waterford (2)	county	Waterford	1918	1922	
Waterford City	borough	Waterford	1801	1918	2 MPs, 1832–85
Waterford East	county	Waterford	1885	1918	
Waterford West	county	Waterford	1885	1918	
Westmeath (1)	county	Westmeath	1801	1885	2 MPs
Westmeath (2)	county	Westmeath	1918	1922	
Westmeath North	county	Westmeath	1885	1918	
Westmeath South	county	Westmeath	1885	1918	
Wexford	borough	Wexford	1801	1885	
County Wexford	county	Wexford	1801	1885	2 MPs
Wexford North	county	Wexford	1885	1922	
Wexford South	county	Wexford	1885	1922	
Wicklow	county	Wicklow	1801	1885	2 MPs
Wicklow East	county	Wicklow	1885	1922	
Wicklow West	county	Wicklow	1885	1922	
Youghal	borough	Cork	1801	1885	

== List of Northern Ireland constituencies ==
Constituency	Type	Created	Abolished	Notes
Antrim	county	1922	1950	2 MPs
Antrim East	county	1983	Current	
Antrim North	county	1950	Current	
Antrim South	county	1950	Current	
Armagh	county	1922	1983	
Belfast East	borough	1922	Current	
Belfast North	borough	1922	Current	
Belfast South	borough	1922	2024	
Belfast South and Mid Down	borough	2024	Current	
Belfast West	borough	1922	Current	
Down	county	1922	1950	2 MPs
Down North	county	1950	Current	
Fermanagh & South Tyrone	county	1950	Current	
Fermanagh & Tyrone	county	1922	1950	2 MPs
Foyle	county	1983	Current	
Down South	county	1950	Current	
Lagan Valley	county	1983	Current	
Londonderry	county	1922	1983	
Londonderry East	county	1983	Current	
Newry & Armagh	county	1983	Current	
Queen's University of Belfast	university	1918	1950	
Strangford	county	1983	Current	
Tyrone West	county	1997	Current	
Ulster Mid	county	1950	Current	
Upper Bann	county	1983	Current	

== Historical representation by party ==
See List of parliamentary constituencies in Northern Ireland for Antrim, Londonderry, Tyrone, Armagh, Down and Fermanagh.

A cell marked → (with a different colour background to the preceding cell) indicates that the previous MP continued to sit under a new party name.

=== Donegal (4) ===
Irish National Federation Irish Parliamentary Party (1885–1890, 1900–1922) / Irish National League (1890–1900) Sinn Féin

Constituency	1885	1886	87	90	90	1892	1895	1900	02	05	1906	Jan 1910	Dec 1910	1918
East Donegal	O'Connor				→			McFadden			McVeigh	E. Kelly		
North Donegal	J. E. O'Doherty			Maguire		Mains	Curran	W. O'Doherty		Muldoon	P. O'Doherty			J. O'Doherty
South Donegal	B. Kelly		MacNeill		→			→						Ward
West Donegal	O'Hea			Dalton		Sullivan		Boyle	Law					Sweeney

=== Monaghan (2) ===
Independent Nationalist Irish National Federation Irish Parliamentary Party (1885–1890, 1900–1922) / Irish National League (1890–1900) Sinn Féin

Constituency	1885	86	1886	1892	1895	1900	00	02	1906	07	09	Jan 1910	Dec 1910	1918
North Monaghan	Healy	O'Brien		Diamond	MacAleese	→	Thompson		O'Hare	Lardner				Blythe
South Monaghan	McKenna			O'Driscoll	Daly	→		McKean			→			MacEntee

=== Cavan (2) ===
Irish National Federation Irish Parliamentary Party (1885–1890, 1900–1922) / Irish National League (1890–1900) Sinn Féin

Constituency	1885	1886	90	1892	1895	95	1900	04	1906	Jan 1910	Dec 1910	18	1918
East Cavan	O'Hanlon			Young			→					Griffith	
West Cavan	Biggar		Knox	→		Farrell	McGovern	Kennedy					Galligan

=== Galway (5) ===
Independent Nationalist Irish National Federation Irish Parliamentary Party (1885–1890, 1900–1922) / Irish National League (1890–1900) Irish Unionist Sinn Féin

Constituency	1885	86	1886	90	90	1892	1895	1900	01	03	1906	06	Jan 1910	Dec 1910	14	1918
Galway Borough	O'Connor (Note: Sat for Liverpool Scotland.)	O'Shea	Pinkerton		→			Morris	Lynch	Devlin		Gwynn				
Connemara	Foley				→		W. O'Malley	→								P. Ó Máille
East Galway	Harris			Roche	→			→							Cosgrave	Mellows
North Galway	Nolan						Kilbride	Nolan			Higgins	Hazleton				Cusack
South Galway	Sheehy				→			Duffy								Fahy

=== Leitrim (2) ===
Irish National Federation Irish Parliamentary Party (1885–1890, 1900–1922) / Irish National League (1890–1900) Sinn Féin

Constituency	1885	1886	90	1892	1895	1900	1906	06	08	Jan 1910	Dec 1910	1918
North Leitrim / Leitrim (1918)	Conway			McHugh		→		C. Dolan	Meehan			J. Dolan
South Leitrim	Hayden			Tully		→	Smyth					

=== Roscommon (2) ===
Irish National Federation Irish Parliamentary Party (1885–1890, 1900–1922) / Irish National League (1890–1900) Sinn Féin

Constituency	1885	1886	90	1892	1895	97	1900	1906	Jan 1910	Dec 1910	17	1918
North Roscommon	O'Kelly			Bodkin	O'Kelly						Plunkett	
South Roscommon	Commins		→	L. Hayden		J. Hayden						Boland

=== Sligo (2) ===
Irish National Federation Irish Parliamentary Party (1885–1890, 1900–1922) / Irish National League (1890–1900) Sinn Féin

Constituency	1885	1886	87	88	91	1892	1895	00	1900	1906	09	Jan 1910	Dec 1910	1918
North Sligo	McDonald				Collery			O'Dowd	McKillop	McHugh	Scanlan			Clancy
South Sligo	Sexton		Kennedy	Leamy		Curran			O'Dowd					McCabe

=== Mayo (4) ===
All-for-Ireland League Irish National Federation Irish Parliamentary Party (1885–1890, 1900–1922) / Irish National League (1890–1900) Sinn Féin

Constituency	1885	1886	91	1892	93	1895	00	1900	1906	Jan 1910	Dec 1910	1918
East Mayo	Dillon		→					→				De Valera
North Mayo	Crilly		→					O'Kelly		Boyle		Crowley
South Mayo	O'Brien		→			Davitt	O'Donnell			→	Fitzgibbon	Sears
West Mayo	Deasy		→		Ambrose			→		Doris		MacBride

=== Longford (2) ===
Irish National Federation Irish Parliamentary Party (1885–1890, 1900–1922) / Irish National League (1890–1900) Sinn Féin

Constituency	1885	1886	87	88	91	1892	1895	1900	1906	07	Jan 1910	Dec 1910	17	1918
North Longford	McCarthy		Healy		→	McCarthy		Farrell						
South Longford / Longford (1918)	Connolly			Fitzgerald		Blake		→		Phillips			McGuinness	

=== Louth (2) ===
All-for-Ireland League Healyite Nationalist Independent Nationalist Irish National Federation Irish Parliamentary Party (1885–1890, 1900–1922) / Irish National League (1890–1900) Sinn Féin

Constituency	1885	1886	91	1892	1895	96	1900	01	1906	Jan 1910	Dec 1910	11	16	1918
North Louth / Louth (1918)	Nolan			Healy			→			→	Hazleton	Roche	Whitty	O'Kelly
South Louth	Gill		→	Ambrose		McGhee	Nolan	→						

=== King's County (2) ===
Independent Nationalist Irish National Federation Irish Parliamentary Party (1885–1890, 1900–1922) / Irish National League (1890–1900) Sinn Féin

Constituency	1885	1886	1892	1895	1900	1906	Jan 1910	Dec 1910	14	18	1918
Birr	Molloy		→		Reddy						
Tullamore	Fox		→		Haviland-Burke				Graham	McCartan	
King's County											McCartan

=== Queen's County (2) ===
Irish National Federation Irish Parliamentary Party (1885–1890, 1900–1922) / Irish National League (1890–1900) Sinn Féin

Constituency	1885	86	1886	1892	1895	1900	1906	Jan 1910	Dec 1910	13	16	1918
Leix / Queen's County (1918)	Lalor			MacDonnell		→	P. A. Meehan			P. J. Meehan		O'Higgins
Ossory	O'Connor	O'Mara	Macdonald	Crean		Delany					Fitzpatrick	

=== Meath (2) ===
Independent Nationalist Irish National Federation Irish Parliamentary Party (1885–1890, 1900–1922) / Irish National League (1890–1900) Sinn Féin

Constituency	1885	1886	1892	93	1895	1900	03	1906	Jan 1910	Dec 1910	1918	19
North Meath	O'Doherty	Mahony	Davitt	Gibney		White					Mellows	vacant
South Meath	Sheil		Fullam	Jordan	Parnell	Carew	Sheehy				Duggan	

=== Westmeath (2) ===
Healyite Nationalist Independent Nationalist Irish National Federation Irish Parliamentary Party (1885–1890, 1900–1922) / Irish National League (1890–1900) Sinn Féin

Constituency	1885	1886	91	1892	1895	1900	03	1906	07	09	Jan 1910	Dec 1910	17	1918
North Westmeath / Westmeath	Tuite		→			Kennedy	→	Ginnell		→			→	
South Westmeath	Sullivan		→			→			Nugent					

=== Carlow (1) ===
Irish National Federation Irish Parliamentary Party (1885–1890, 1900–1922) / Irish National League (1890–1900) Sinn Féin

Constituency	1885	86	1886	87	91	1892	1895	1900	1906	08	Jan 1910	Dec 1910	1918
County Carlow	Gray	Blake		Mahon	Hammond			→		Kavanagh	Molloy		Lennon

=== Dublin (8) ===
Independent Nationalist Irish National Federation Irish Parliamentary Party (1885–1890, 1900–1922) / Irish National League (1890–1900) Irish Unionist Liberal Liberal Unionist Sinn Féin

Constituency	1885	1886	88	90	1892	1895	96	97	98	1900	04	1906	Jan 1910	10	Dec 1910	15	17	1918
Dublin College Green	Sullivan			→	J. Kenny		Carew			Nannetti						Nugent		O'Kelly
Dublin Harbour	Harrington							→		→				Abraham		Byrne		Shanahan
Dublin St Patrick's	Murphy			→	Field													Markievicz
Dublin St Stephen's Green	Gray		Dickson		W. Kenny				Campbell	McCann	Waldron		Brady					Kelly
North Dublin	Clancy																	Lawless
South Dublin	Esmonde			→	Plunkett					Mooney		Long	Cooper		Cotton		Hearn	Duffy
Dublin Clontarf																		Mulcahy
Dublin Pembroke																		FitzGerald
Dublin Rathmines																		Dockrell
Dublin St James's																		McGrath
Dublin St Michan's																		Staines

=== Wicklow (2) ===
Irish National Federation Irish Parliamentary Party (1885–1890, 1900–1922) / Irish National League (1890–1900) Sinn Féin

Constituency	1885	1886	1892	95	1895	1900	1906	07	Jan 1910	10	Dec 1910	11	14	1918
East Wicklow	Corbet		Sweetman	O'Kelly	Corbet	Cogan		Muldoon				Donelan		Etchingham
West Wicklow	Byrne		O'Connor			→				O'Kelly			Donovan	Barton

=== Kildare (2) ===
Irish National Federation Irish Parliamentary Party (1885–1890, 1900–1922) / Irish National League (1890–1900) Sinn Féin

Constituency	1885	1886	1892	1895	1900	03	05	1906	Jan 1910	Dec 1910	1918
North Kildare	Carew		Kennedy	Engledow	Leamy		J. O'Connor				Ua Buachalla
South Kildare	Leahy		Minch		→	Kilbride					A. O'Connor

=== Kilkenny (3) ===
Anti-Parnellite Nationalist (1890) / Irish National Federation Irish Parliamentary Party (1885–1890, 1900–1922) / Irish National League (1890–1900) Sinn Féin

Constituency	1885	1886	90	91	1892	94	1895	1900	02	1906	06	07	09	Jan 1910	Dec 1910	17	1918
Kilkenny City	Smithwick	Quinn		→	Curran		O'Brien									Cosgrave	
North Kilkenny	Marum		Hennessy	McDermott				→	Devlin		Meagher						Cosgrave
South Kilkenny	Chance		→			Morris		O'Mara				Murphy	Keating				O'Mara

=== Wexford (2) ===
Irish National Federation Irish Parliamentary Party (1885–1890, 1900–1922) / Irish National League (1890–1900) Sinn Féin

Constituency	1885	1886	90	92	1892	93	1895	1900	1906	Jan 1910	Dec 1910	1918
North Wexford	Redmond			Healy				Esmonde				Sweetman
South Wexford	Barry		→			Ffrench		→				Ryan

=== Clare (2) ===
Irish National Federation Irish Parliamentary Party (1885–1890, 1900–1922) / Irish National League (1890–1900) Irish Unionist Sinn Féin

Constituency	1885	1886	1892	1895	1900	04	1906	09	Jan 1910	Dec 1910	17	1918
East Clare	Cox		Redmond								De Valera	
West Clare	Jordan		Maguire	Jameson	→	→	Halpin	Lynch				O'Higgins

=== Tipperary (4) ===
Irish National Federation Irish Parliamentary Party (1885–1890, 1900–1922) / Irish National League (1890–1900) Sinn Féin

Constituency	1885	1886	90	1892	93	1895	1900	1906	Jan 1910	Dec 1910	15	1918	19
East Tipperary	Condon		→				→					McCan	vacant
Mid Tipperary	Mayne		Harrison	McCarthy	J. Hogan		K. O'Brien		Hackett			Burke	
North Tipperary	P. O'Brien		→				→	M. Hogan	J. J. Esmonde		J. L. Esmonde	MacDonagh	
South Tipperary	O'Connor			Mandeville			Cullinan					Moloney	

=== Limerick (3) ===
Irish National Federation Irish Parliamentary Party (1885–1890, 1900–1922) / Irish National League (1890–1900) Sinn Féin

Constituency	1885	1886	88	91	1892	1895	95	1900	1906	09	Jan 1910	Dec 1910	1918
Limerick City	Gill		O'Keefe	→		Daly	O'Keefe	Joyce					Colivet
East Limerick	Finucane			→				W. Lundon		T. Lundon			Hayes
West Limerick	Abraham			→	Austin			O'Shaughnessy					Collins

=== Kerry (4) ===
Independent Nationalist Irish National Federation Irish Parliamentary Party (1885–1890, 1900–1922) / Irish National League (1890–1900) Sinn Féin

Constituency	1885	1886	87	91	1892	1895	95	96	1900	1906	Jan 1910	10	Dec 1910	1918
East Kerry	Sheehan			→		Davitt		Roche	Murphy		E. O'Sullivan	→	T. O'Sullivan	Béaslaí
North Kerry	J. Stack			→	Sexton			Flavin	→					Crowley
South Kerry	O'Connor		Kilbride	→			Farrell		Boland					Lynch
West Kerry	Harrington				Esmonde				O'Donnell					A. Stack

=== Cork (9) ===
All-for-Ireland League Independent Labour Independent Nationalist Irish National Federation Irish Parliamentary Party (1885–1890, 1900–1922) / Irish National League (1890–1900) Sinn Féin

Constituency	1885	1886	87	89	91	1892	93	93	95	1895	1900	01	05	1906	06	09	Jan 1910	Dec 1910	11	13	14	16	1918	20
Cork City	Parnell				Flavin	W. O'Brien			J. O'Brien		→		Roche					M. Healy					De Róiste	
Cork City	M. Healy				→						W. O'Brien (Note: W. O'Brien (IPP), was also elected for Cork City and elected to sit for that seat, necessitating a fresh by-election in March which was won by M. Healy (IPP).)					M. Healy	W. O'Brien				→		Walsh	
East Cork	Lane				→	Donelan					→								Muldoon				Kent	
Mid Cork	Tanner				→						→	Sheehan			→		→						MacSwiney	vacant
North Cork	Flynn				→						→						P. Guiney			J. Guiney			O'Keeffe	
North East Cork	Leamy		W. O'Brien		→		Davitt	Abraham			→						M. Healy	Frewen	T. Healy				Hunter	
South Cork	Kenny					Barry					→							J. P. Walsh					Collins	
South East Cork	Hooper			Morrogh	→		Commins				Crean						→						Lynch	
West Cork	Gilhooly				→						→						→					O'Leary	Hayes	

=== Waterford (3) ===
Irish National Federation Irish Parliamentary Party (1885–1890, 1900–1922) / Irish National League (1890–1900) Sinn Féin

Constituency	1885	1886	90	91	1892	1895	95	1900	1906	Jan 1910	Dec 1910	13	18	1918
Waterford City	R. Power			J. Redmond									W. Redmond	
East Waterford	P. Power				→			→				Murphy		
West Waterford	Pyne		Webb		→		O'Shee	→						
County Waterford														Brugha

=== Universities (2) ===
Conservative Independent Unionist Irish Unionist Liberal Unionist Sinn Féin

Constituency	1885	1886	87	1892	1895	95	1900	03	1906	Jan 1910	Dec 1910	1918	19
Dublin University	Holmes		Madden	Carson								Woods	
Dublin University	Plunket			→		Lecky		Campbell			Samuels		Jellett
National University												MacNeill	

== Sources ==
- See List of former United Kingdom Parliament constituencies
- Walker, B.M., ed. (1978). Parliamentary Election Results in Ireland, 1801–1922. Dublin: Royal Irish Academy. ISBN 0901714127.
- Final Recommendations Report: 2018 Review of Parliamentary Constituencies (Boundary Commission for Northern Ireland 2018)
