= 1918 United Kingdom general election in Ireland =

- 14 December 1918

105 of the 707 seats to the House of Commons of the United Kingdom
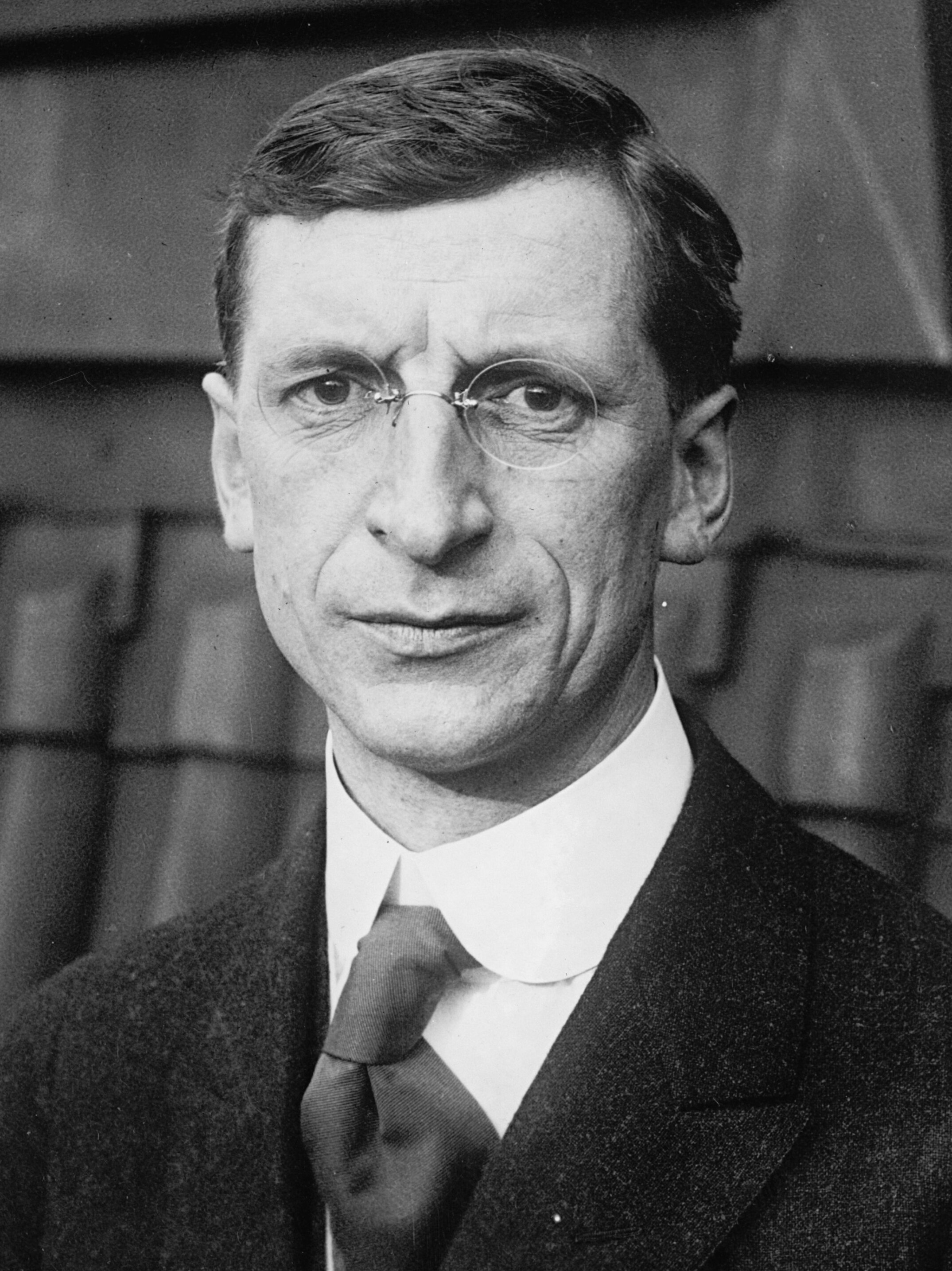

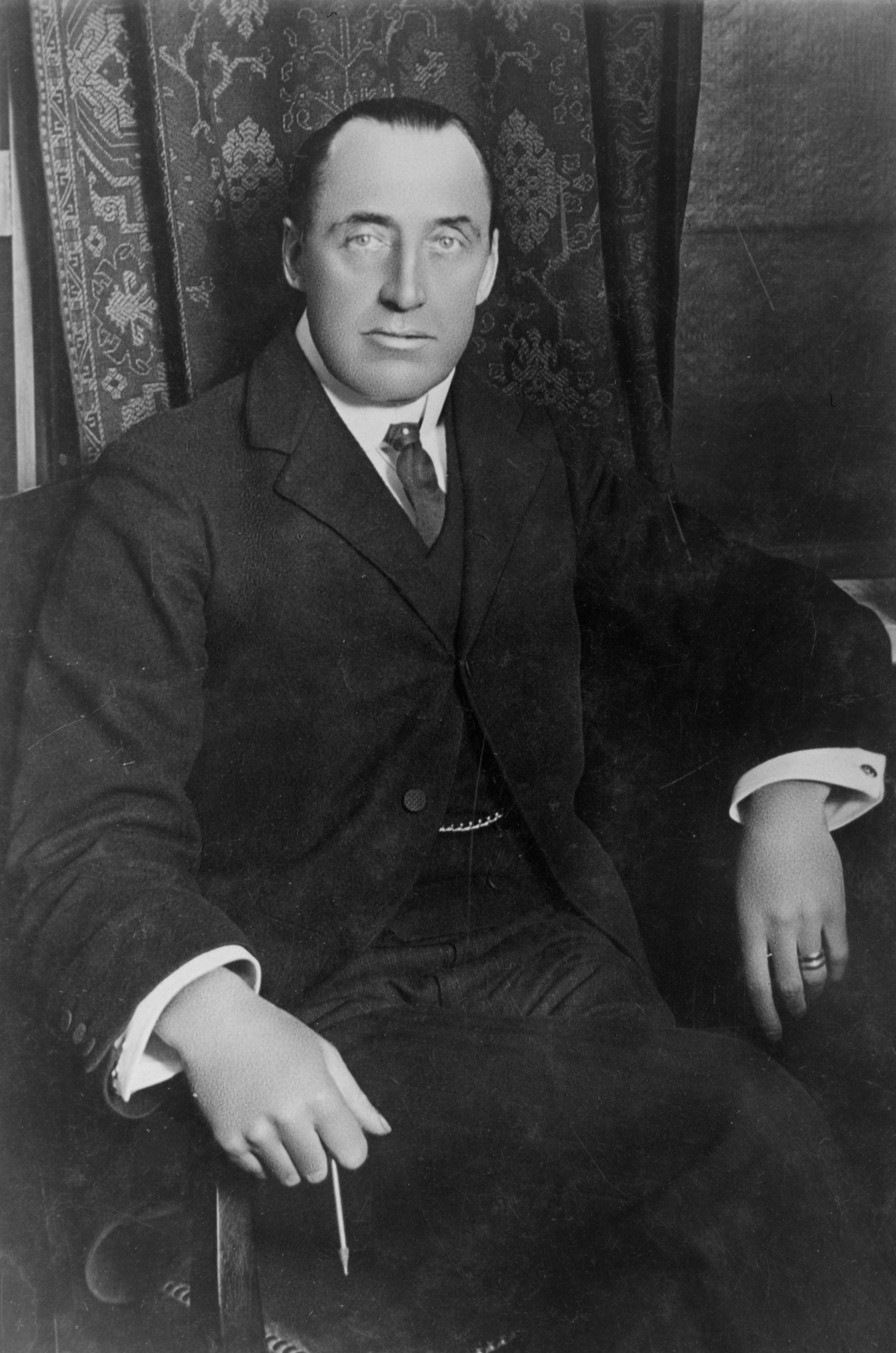

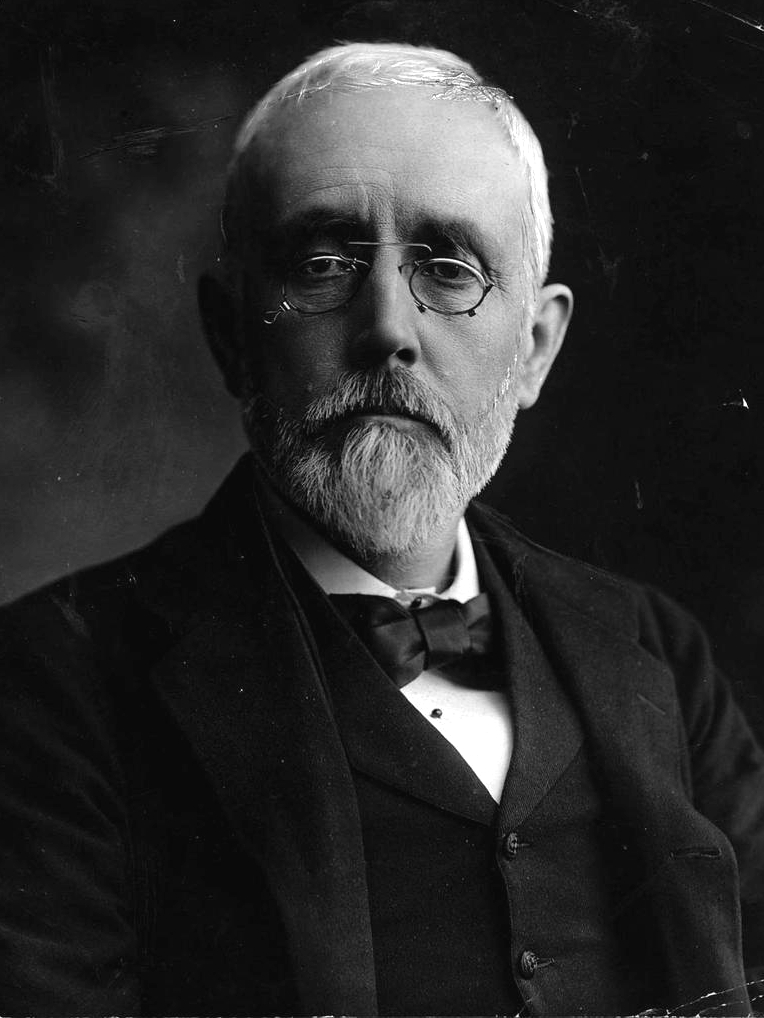
	First party	Second party	Third party
Leader	Éamon de Valera	Sir Edward Carson	John Dillon
Party	Sinn Féin	Irish Unionist	Irish Parliamentary
Leader since	25 October 1917	1910	March 1918
Leader's seat	East Clare and East Mayo	Belfast Duncairn	East Mayo (defeated)
Last election	n/a	17 seats, 28.6%	74 seats, 43.6%
Seats before	6	17	67
Seats won	73 (Note: Includes 25 members elected unopposed.)	22	6
Seat change	▲73	▲5	▼68
Popular vote	497,107 (Note: Voting took place in 80 of 105 seats. The other 25 MPs were unopposed.)	257,314	220,837
Percentage	46.9%	25.3%	21.7%
Swing	New party	▼3.3%	▼21.9%

The Irish component of the 1918 United Kingdom general election took place on 14 December 1918. It was the final United Kingdom general election to be held throughout Ireland, as the next election would happen following Irish independence. It is a key moment in modern Irish history, seeing the overwhelming defeat of the moderate nationalist Irish Parliamentary Party (IPP), which had dominated the Irish political landscape since the 1880s, and a landslide victory for the radical Sinn Féin party. Sinn Féin had never previously stood in a general election, but had won six seats in by-elections in 1917–1918. The party had vowed in its manifesto to establish an independent Irish Republic. In Ulster, however, the Unionist Party was the most successful party.

In the aftermath of the elections, Sinn Féin's elected members refused to attend the British Parliament in Westminster (London), and instead formed a parliament in Dublin, Dáil Éireann ("Assembly of Ireland"), which declared Irish independence as a republic. The Irish War of Independence was conducted under this revolutionary government which sought international recognition, and set about the process of state-building. The other parties elected in the election were invited by Sinn Féin to join in creating the Dáil Éireann, but declined and took up their seats at Westminster.

In 1918 a system called plural voting was in place in both Britain and Ireland. Plural voting was a practice whereby one person might be able to vote multiple times in an election. Property and business owners could vote both in the constituency where their property lay and that in which they lived, if the two were different. This system often resulted in one person being able to cast multiple votes. In the newly formed Irish Free State this system was ended by the Electoral Act 1923 and was abolished in the UK by the Representation of the People Act 1948. Plural voting remained in effect in Northern Ireland until 1969.

The 1918 election was held in the aftermath of World War I, the Easter Rising and the Conscription Crisis. It was the first general election to be held after the Representation of the People Act 1918. It was thus the first election in which women over the age of 30, and all men over the age of 21, could vote. Previously, all women and most working-class men had been excluded from voting.

== Background ==
In 1918 the whole of Ireland was a part of the United Kingdom of Great Britain and Ireland, and was represented in the British Parliament by 105 Members of Parliament (MPs). Whereas in Great Britain most elected politicians were members of either the Liberal Party or the Conservative Party, from the early 1880s most Irish MPs were Irish nationalists, who sat together in the British House of Commons as the Irish Parliamentary Party.

The IPP strove for Home Rule, that is, limited self-government for Ireland within the United Kingdom, and had been supported by most Irish people, especially the Catholic majority. Home Rule was opposed by most Protestants in Ireland, who formed a majority of the population in parts of the northern province of Ulster but a minority in the rest of Ireland, and favoured maintenance of the Union with Great Britain (and were therefore called Unionists).

The Unionists were supported by the Conservative Party, whereas from 1885 the Liberal Party was committed to enacting some form of Home Rule. Unionists eventually formed their own representation, first the Irish Unionist Party then the Ulster Unionist Party. Home Rule appeared to have been finally achieved with the passing of the Home Rule Act 1914. However, the implementation of the Act was temporarily postponed with the outbreak of World War I due to determined Ulster Unionists' resistance to the Act. As the war prolonged and with the failure to make any progress on the issue, the more radical Sinn Féin began to grow in strength.

=== Rise of Sinn Féin ===
Sinn Féin was founded by Arthur Griffith in 1905. He believed that Irish nationalists should emulate the Ausgleich of Hungarian nationalists who, in the 19th century under Ferenc Deák, had chosen to boycott the imperial parliament in Vienna and unilaterally established their own legislature in Budapest.

Griffith had favoured a peaceful solution based on 'dual monarchy' with Britain, that is two separate states with a single head of state and a limited central government to control matters of common concern only. However, by 1918, under its new leader Éamon de Valera, Sinn Féin had come to favour achieving separation from Britain by means of an armed uprising if necessary and the establishment of an independent republic.

In the aftermath of the 1916 Easter Rising the party's ranks were swelled by participants and supporters of the rebellion as they were freed from British prisons and internment camps, and at its 1917 Ard Fheis (annual conference) de Valera was elected leader and the new, more radical policy adopted.

Prior to 1916, Sinn Féin had been a fringe movement having a limited cooperative alliance with William O'Brien's All-for-Ireland League and enjoyed little electoral success. However, between the Easter Rising of that year and the 1918 general election, the party's popularity increased dramatically. This was due to the failure to have the Home Rule Bill implemented when the IPP resisted the partition of Ireland demanded by Ulster Unionists in 1914, 1916 and 1917, but also popular antagonism towards the British authorities created by the execution of most of the leaders of the 1916 rebels and by their botched attempt to introduce Home Rule on the conclusion of the Irish Convention linked with military conscription in Ireland (see Conscription Crisis of 1918).

Sinn Féin demonstrated its new electoral capability in four by-election successes in 1917 in which Count Plunkett, Joseph McGuinness, de Valera and W. T. Cosgrave were each elected, although it lost three by-elections in early 1918 before winning two more with Patrick McCartan and Arthur Griffith. In one case there were unproven allegations of electoral fraud. The party had benefitted from a number of factors in the 1918 elections, including demographic changes and political factors.

=== Changes in the electorate ===
The Irish electorate in 1918, as with the entire electorate throughout the United Kingdom, had changed in two major ways since the preceding general election. Firstly, there was a "generational" change because of the First World War, which meant that the British general election due in 1915 had not taken place. No election being held between 1910 and 1918 represented the longest gap in modern British and Irish constitutional history until then (it was superseded in Britain in 1935–1945). Thus the 1918 election saw, in particular:

- All voters between the age of 21 and 29 were first time general election voters. They had no history of past voter loyalty to the IPP to fall back on, and had begun their political awareness in the period of 8 years that had seen a bitter world war, the home rule controversy and the Easter Rising and its aftermath.
- A generation of older voters, most of them IPP supporters, had died in that eight-year period.
- Emigration (except to Britain) had been almost impossible during the war because of the dangerous sea lanes, which meant that tens of thousands of young people were in Ireland who in normal times would have been abroad.
- As Ireland had not had conscription, Unionists and moderate Nationalists had predominantly made up the volunteers for the duration of the war. Consequently, there was a large loss in the age range of young Unionists and moderate Nationalists, which did not occur amongst Republicans who had not volunteered.

Secondly, the franchise had been greatly extended by the Representation of the People Act 1918. This granted voting rights to women (albeit only those over 30) for the first time, and gave all men over 21 and military servicemen over 19 a vote in parliamentary elections without property qualifications. The Irish electorate increased from around 700,000 to about two million.

Overall, a new generation of young voters, and the sudden influx of women over thirty, meant that vast numbers of new voters of unknown voter affiliation existed, changing dramatically the composition of the Irish electorate.

=== Political factors ===
- Since the previous general election in December 1910, the formerly-dominant Irish Parliamentary Party, unchallenged for nearly a decade, was largely of an older generation. Its local organisation had atrophied, making defence of its seats difficult. The party's votes in parliament had been decisive in passing the 1914 Home Rule Act but, due to the outbreak of the War, it was never put into effect. The party's policy was to achieve All-Ireland self-government constitutionally, within the framework of the United Kingdom, as opposed to using separatist physical force.
- The electorate had become enamoured with Sinn Féin, particularly due to the harsh response of the authorities to the Easter Rising. Sinn Féin had been falsely blamed for the Rising even though it had taken no part in it. The party also took most of the credit for the successful campaign to prevent the introduction of conscription in 1918.
- Whereas the IPP had conceded a temporary form of partition in 1914 and 1916, as a measure to pacify Ulster loyalist. Sinn Féin felt that that would worsen and prolong any differences between north and south.
- In contrast to the IPP, Sinn Féin were seen as a young and radical force. Its leaders, such as Michael Collins (28) and de Valera (36), were young militant politicians, like most of the new voters and their imprisoned republican candidates.
- IPP leaders such as John Dillon, who had been in public office since the 1880s, were largely older, moderate politicians, and had campaigned for All-Ireland Home Rule since the time of Charles Stewart Parnell, and continued to press for the implementation of the 1914 Act, and a constitutional solution to have Ulster included in the jurisdiction of a Dublin parliament.
- On the other hand, Sinn Féin promoted a radical new policy of achieving Irish self-government outside of the UK, and many of its volunteer wing were ready to defend a republic with physical force. By 1918, Sinn Féin followers had come to see the gradual acquisition of All-Ireland Home Rule as an idea whose time had come and gone.
- The Irish population had been radicalised during World War I. In addition to the heavy losses suffered by Irish regiments, the conscription threat and British military measures, there was rapid inflation that sparked off a wave of strikes and industrial disputes. The 1918 election also occurred at a time of revolution across Europe.
- Unionist fear of Home Rule, or worse, separation, solidified after the Rising, and the Unionist vote was enhanced in Ulster by the increased electorate. It was the first election since the Ulster Covenant, the formation of the Ulster Volunteers (UVF), and the Battle of the Somme.
- Sinn Féin's policy was outlined in its election manifesto, which aimed for Irish representation at any post-war peace conference. By contrast, IPP policy was to leave negotiation to the British government.
- Nearly a year earlier, in January 1918, Woodrow Wilson had issued his Fourteen Points policy, which seemed to promise that self-government and self-determination would become the norm in international relations.
- The Ulster Unionists' resistance to All-Ireland self-government remained unresolved, and little account was taken of Unionist reservations about what they contended would be Catholic rule from Dublin.

== Retiring incumbents ==
Forty-four outgoing members of the 30th Parliament did not seek re-election:

Constituency	Departing MP	Party	First elected
Belfast East	Robert Sharman-Crawford	Irish Unionist	1914
Belfast North	Robert Thompson	Irish Unionist	1910
Cavan West	Vincent Kennedy	Irish Parliamentary	1904
Cork City	Maurice Healy	All-for-Ireland	1885
Cork City	William O'Brien	All-for-Ireland	1883
Cork East	John Muldoon	Irish Parliamentary	1905
Cork North	John Guiney	All-for-Ireland	1913
Cork North East	Timothy Healy	All-for-Ireland	1880
Cork South	John P. Walsh	All-for-Ireland	1910
Cork South East	Eugene Crean	All-for-Ireland	1892
Cork West	Daniel O'Leary	Irish Parliamentary	1916
County Carlow	Michael Molloy	Irish Parliamentary	1910
Donegal South	J. G. Swift MacNeill	Irish Parliamentary	1887
Donegal West	Hugh Law	Irish Parliamentary	1902
Down West	William MacCaw	Irish Unionist	1908
Dublin County South	Michael Hearn	Irish Parliamentary	1917
Galway East	James Cosgrave	Irish Parliamentary	1914
Kerry East	Timothy O'Sullivan	Irish Parliamentary	1910
Kerry North	Michael Joseph Flavin	Irish Parliamentary	1896
Kerry South	John Pius Boland	Irish Parliamentary	1900
Kerry West	Thomas O'Donnell	Irish Parliamentary	1900
Kilkenny North	Michael Meagher	Irish Parliamentary	1906
King's County Birr	Michael Reddy	Irish Parliamentary	1900
Leitrim North	Francis Meehan	Irish Parliamentary	1908
Leitrim South	Thomas Francis Smyth	Irish Parliamentary	1906
Limerick City	Michael Joyce	Irish Parliamentary	1900
Limerick West	Patrick O'Shaughnessy	Irish Parliamentary	1900
Londonderry City	Sir James Dougherty	Liberal	1914
Londonderry North	Hugh T. Barrie	Irish Unionist	1906
Louth North	Patrick Whitty	Irish Parliamentary	1916
Louth South	Joseph Nolan	Irish Parliamentary	1885
Mayo South	John Fitzgibbon	Irish Parliamentary	1910
Meath North	Patrick White	Irish Parliamentary	1900
Meath South	David Sheehy	Irish Parliamentary	1885
Monaghan North	James Lardner	Irish Parliamentary	1907
Monaghan South	John McKean	Ind. Nationalist	1902
Newry	John Mooney	Irish Parliamentary	1900
Queen's County Ossory	John Fitzpatrick	Irish Parliamentary	1916
Tipperary Mid	John Hackett	Irish Parliamentary	1910
Tipperary North	John Esmonde	Irish Parliamentary	1915
Tyrone Mid	Richard McGhee	Irish Parliamentary	1896
Tyrone North	Thomas Russell	Liberal	1886
Waterford East	Martin Joseph Murphy	Irish Parliamentary	1913
Wicklow East	Anthony Donelan	Irish Parliamentary	1892

== MPs standing under a different political affiliation ==
Six MPs stood under a different political affiliation from the December 1910 general election.

Outgoing MP	Dec. 1910 party	Dec. 1910 constituency	1918 party	1918 constituency
Arthur Alfred Lynch	Irish Parliamentary	Clare West	Labour	Battersea South (England)
Laurence Ginnell	Ind. Nationalist	Westmeath North	Sinn Féin	County Westmeath
Stephen Gwynn	Irish Parliamentary	Galway Borough	Ind. Nationalist	Dublin University
William Mitchell-Thomson	Irish Unionist	Down North	Unionist	Glasgow Maryhill (Scotland)
Sir Walter Nugent	Irish Parliamentary	Westmeath South	Ind. Nationalist	County Westmeath
D. D. Sheehan	All-for-Ireland	Cork Mid	Labour	Stepney Limehouse (England)

One MP stood under a different political affiliation from their by-election victory.

Outgoing MP	By-election party	1918 party	Constituency (by-election)
George Noble Plunkett	Ind. Nationalist	Sinn Féin	Roscommon North (1917)

== The election ==
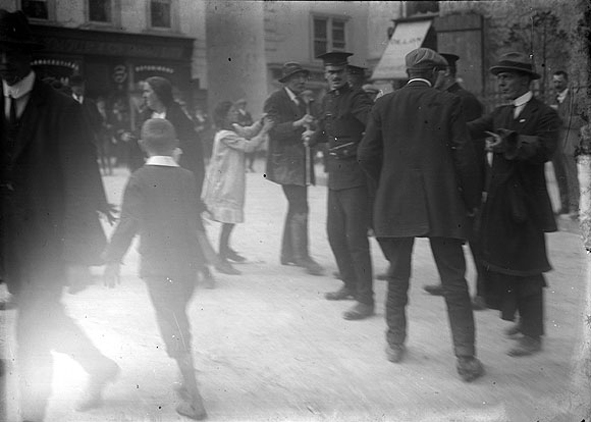
Election campaigning on a busy Irish street, 1918

Voting in most Irish constituencies occurred on Saturday, 14 December 1918. While the rest of the United Kingdom fought the 'Khaki election' on other issues involving the British parties, in Ireland four major political parties had national appeal. These were the IPP, Sinn Féin, the Irish Unionist Party and the Irish Labour Party. The Labour Party, however, decided not to participate in the election, fearing that it would be caught in the political crossfire between the IPP and Sinn Féin; it thought it better to let the people make up their minds on the issue of Home Rule versus a Republic by having a clear two-way choice between the two nationalist parties. The Unionist Party favoured continuance of the union with Britain (along with its subordinate, the Ulster Unionist Labour Association, who fought as Labour Unionists). A number of other small nationalist parties also took part.

Ireland had 105 seats elected from 103 constituencies. Ninety-nine seats were elected from single-seat geographical constituencies under the first-past-the-post voting system. There were two two-seat constituencies: Dublin University (Trinity College) elected two MPs under the single transferable vote and Cork City elected two MPs under the bloc voting system.

In addition to ordinary geographical constituencies there were three university constituencies: the Queen's University of Belfast (which returned a Unionist), Dublin University (which returned two Unionists) and the National University (which returned a member of Sinn Féin).

Of the 105 seats, 25 were uncontested, with a Sinn Féin candidate winning unopposed. Seventeen of these seats were in Munster. In some cases it was because there was a certain winner in Sinn Féin.

== Results ==
=== Voting summary ===
Summary of 14 December 1918 Dáil Éireann and House of Commons (Irish seats) election results
Party	Leader	Votes	% Votes	Swing%	TDs/MPs	Change (since Dec. 1910)	% of seats
Sinn Féin	Éamon de Valera	476,087	46.9 (Note: Not counting constituencies where Sinn Féin candidates were elected unopposed.)	▲46.9	73	▲73	69.5
Irish Unionist	Edward Carson	257,314	25.3	▼3.3	22	▲5	20.9
Irish Parliamentary	John Dillon	220,837	21.7	▼21.9	6	▼67	5.7
Labour Unionist	None	30,304	3.0	▲3.0	3	▲3	2.8
Belfast Labour	None	12,164	1.2	▲1.2	0	0	0
Ind. Unionist	— (Note: Elected independent unionist candidate was Robert Henry Woods.)	9,531	0.9	▲0.9	1	▲1	0.95
Ind. Nationalist	—	8,183	0.8	N/A	0	▼2	0
Independent Labour	—	659	0.1	▲0.1	0	0	0
Independent	—	436	0.1	▲0.1	0	0	0
Total		1,015,515	100		105		

Popular vote
Sinn Féin	46.88%
Irish Unionist	25.33%
Irish Parliamentary	21.75%
Labour Unionist	2.98%
Belfast Labour	1.20%
Independent Unionist	0.94%
Independent Nationalist	0.81%
Others	0.11%

=== Seats summary ===
Parliamentary seats
Sinn Féin	69.52%
Irish Unionist	20.95%
Irish Parliamentary	5.71%
Labour Unionist	2.86%
Independent Unionist	0.95%

=== MPs who lost their seats ===
Party	Seats lost	Name	Constituency	Year elected
Irish Parliamentary	28	Daniel Boyle	Mayo North	1910
Irish Parliamentary	28	P. J. Brady	Dublin St Stephen's Green	1910
Irish Parliamentary	28	Alfie Byrne	Dublin Harbour	1915
Irish Parliamentary	28	J. J. Clancy	Dublin County North	1885
Irish Parliamentary	28	Thomas Joseph Condon	Tipperary East	1885
Irish Parliamentary	28	Patrick Crumley	Fermanagh South	1910
Irish Parliamentary	28	John Cullinan	Tipperary South	1900
Irish Parliamentary	28	John Dillon	Mayo East	1880 (Note: Dillon was first elected to the County Tipperary constituency in 1880. He resigned in 1883 but was re-elected in 1885.)
Irish Parliamentary	28	John Donovan	Wicklow West (Note: Donovan contested the Donegal South constituency in 1918.)	1914
Irish Parliamentary	28	William Doris	Mayo West	1910
Irish Parliamentary	28	William Duffy	South Galway	1900
Irish Parliamentary	28	Sir Thomas Esmonde	North Wexford	1885 (Note: Esmonde was first elected to the Dublin South constituency in 1885.)
Irish Parliamentary	28	James Patrick Farrell	North Longford (Note: Farrell contested the County Longford constituency in 1918.)	1895 (Note: Farrell was first elected to the Cavan West constituency in 1895.)
Irish Parliamentary	28	Peter Ffrench	South Wexford	1893
Irish Parliamentary	28	William Field	Dublin St Patrick's	1892
Irish Parliamentary	28	John Patrick Hayden	Roscommon South	1897
Irish Parliamentary	28	Richard Hazleton	Galway North (Note: Hazleton contested the Louth constituency in 1918.)	1906
Irish Parliamentary	28	Matthew Keating	Kilkenny South	1909
Irish Parliamentary	28	Denis Kilbride	Kildare South	1887 (Note: Kilbride was first elected to the Kerry South constituency in 1887. He retired in 1900 but was re-elected in 1903.)
Irish Parliamentary	28	Thomas Lundon	Limerick East	1909
Irish Parliamentary	28	Patrick Joseph Meehan	Queen's County Leix (Note: Meehan contested the Queen's County constituency in 1918.)	1913
Irish Parliamentary	28	John Nugent	Dublin College Green (Note: Nugent contested the Dublin St Michan's constituency in 1918.)	1915
Irish Parliamentary	28	John O'Connor	Kildare North	1885 (Note: O'Connor was first elected to the County Tipperary constituency in 1885. He lost his seat in 1892 but regained it in 1905.)
Irish Parliamentary	28	Philip O'Doherty	Donegal North	1906
Irish Parliamentary	28	John O'Dowd	Sligo South	1900 (Note: O'Dowd was first elected to the Sligo North constituency in 1900.)
Irish Parliamentary	28	William O'Malley	Galway Connemara	1895
Irish Parliamentary	28	J. J. O'Shee	Waterford West (Note: O'Shee contested the Waterford County constituency in 1918.)	1895
Irish Parliamentary	28	Thomas Scanlan	Sligo North	1909
Labour	2	Arthur Alfred Lynch	Clare West (Note: Lynch contested the Battersea South constituency in 1918.)	1901 (Note: Lynch was first elected to the Galway Borough constituency in 1901. He lost his seat in 1903 following his conviction but was re-elected in 1909.)
Labour	2	D. D. Sheehan	Cork Mid (Note: Sheehan contested the Stepney Limehouse constituency in 1918.)	1901
Ind. Nationalist	2	Stephen Gwynn	Galway Borough (Note: Gwynn contested the Dublin University constituency in 1918.)	1906
Ind. Nationalist	2	Sir Walter Nugent	South Westmeath (Note: Sheehan contested the County Westmeath constituency in 1918.)	1907

=== First time MPs ===
In this election, 75 candidates who had never previously been elected to Parliament were elected.

Party	No. of first time MPs	Name	Constituency
Sinn Féin	62	Robert Barton	Wicklow West
Sinn Féin	62	Piaras Béaslaí	Kerry East
Sinn Féin	62	Ernest Blythe	Monaghan North
Sinn Féin	62	Harry Boland	Roscommon South
Sinn Féin	62	Cathal Brugha	County Waterford
Sinn Féin	62	Domhnall Ua Buachalla	North Kildare
Sinn Féin	62	Séamus Burke	Tipperary Mid
Sinn Féin	62	J. J. Clancy	Sligo North
Sinn Féin	62	Michael Colivet	Limerick City
Sinn Féin	62	Con Collins	Limerick West
Sinn Féin	62	Michael Collins	Cork South
Sinn Féin	62	James Crowley	Kerry North
Sinn Féin	62	John Crowley	Mayo North
Sinn Féin	62	Bryan Cusack	Galway North
Sinn Féin	62	James Dolan	County Leitrim
Sinn Féin	62	Eamonn Duggan	Meath South
Sinn Féin	62	Seán Etchingham	Wicklow East
Sinn Féin	62	Frank Fahy	Galway South
Sinn Féin	62	Desmond FitzGerald	Dublin Pembroke
Sinn Féin	62	Peter Paul Galligan	Cavan West
Sinn Féin	62	George Gavan Duffy	Dublin South
Sinn Féin	62	Richard Hayes	Limerick East
Sinn Féin	62	Seán Hayes	Cork West
Sinn Féin	62	Thomas Hunter	Cork North East
Sinn Féin	62	Thomas Kelly	Dublin St Stephen's Green
Sinn Féin	62	David Kent	Cork East
Sinn Féin	62	Frank Lawless	Dublin North
Sinn Féin	62	James Lennon	County Carlow
Sinn Féin	62	Diarmuid Lynch	Cork South East
Sinn Féin	62	Fionán Lynch	Kerry South
Sinn Féin	62	Joseph MacBride	Mayo West
Sinn Féin	62	Joseph MacDonagh	Tipperary North
Sinn Féin	62	Seán MacEntee	Monaghan South
Sinn Féin	62	Eoin MacNeill	Londonderry City
Sinn Féin	62	Eoin MacNeill	National University
Sinn Féin	62	Terence MacSwiney	Cork Mid
Sinn Féin	62	Constance Markievicz	Dublin St Patrick's
Sinn Féin	62	Alexander McCabe	Sligo South
Sinn Féin	62	Pierce McCan	Tipperary East
Sinn Féin	62	Joseph McGrath	Dublin St James's
Sinn Féin	62	Liam Mellows	Galway East
Sinn Féin	62	Liam Mellows	Meath North
Sinn Féin	62	P. J. Moloney	Tipperary South
Sinn Féin	62	Richard Mulcahy	Dublin Clontarf
Sinn Féin	62	Pádraic Ó Máille	Galway Connemara
Sinn Féin	62	Art O'Connor	Kildare South
Sinn Féin	62	Joseph O'Doherty	Donegal North
Sinn Féin	62	Brian O'Higgins	Clare West
Sinn Féin	62	Kevin O'Higgins	Queen's County
Sinn Féin	62	Patrick O'Keeffe	Cork North
Sinn Féin	62	John J. O'Kelly	Louth
Sinn Féin	62	Seán T. O'Kelly	Dublin College Green
Sinn Féin	62	Seán O'Mahony	Fermanagh South
Sinn Féin	62	James O'Mara	Kilkenny South
Sinn Féin	62	Liam de Róiste	Cork City
Sinn Féin	62	James Ryan	Wexford South
Sinn Féin	62	William Sears	Mayo South
Sinn Féin	62	Philip Shanahan	Dublin Harbour
Sinn Féin	62	Austin Stack	Kerry West
Sinn Féin	62	Michael Staines	Dublin St Michan's
Sinn Féin	62	Joseph Sweeney	Donegal West
Sinn Féin	62	Roger Sweetman	Wexford North
Sinn Féin	62	J. J. Walsh	Cork City
Sinn Féin	62	Peter Ward	Donegal South
Irish Unionist	9	Hugh Anderson	Londonderry North
Irish Unionist	9	Thomas Watters Brown	Down North
Irish Unionist	9	Herbert Dixon	Belfast Pottinger
Irish Unionist	9	Maurice Dockrell	Dublin Rathmines
Irish Unionist	9	Robert Lynn	Belfast Woodvale
Irish Unionist	9	Thomas Moles	Belfast Ormeau
Irish Unionist	9	David Reid	Down East
Irish Unionist	9	William Whitla	Queen's University of Belfast
Irish Unionist	9	Daniel M. Wilson	Down West
Labour Unionist	3	Thomas Henry Burn	Belfast St Anne's
Labour Unionist	3	Thompson Donald	Belfast Victoria
Labour Unionist	3	Samuel McGuffin	Belfast Shankill
Ind. Unionist	1	Robert Woods	Dublin University

=== Analysis ===
Sinn Féin vote share by constituency.

Sinn Féin candidates won 73 seats out of 105, but four party candidates (Arthur Griffith, Éamon de Valera, Eoin MacNeill and Liam Mellows) were elected for two constituencies and so the total number of individual Sinn Féin MPs elected was 69. Despite the isolated allegations of intimidation and electoral fraud on the part of both republicans and unionists, the election was seen as a landslide victory for Sinn Féin.

Sinn Féin received 46.9% of votes island-wide, and 65% of votes in the area that became the Irish Free State. However, the 46.9% is not the total result of the overall success of Sinn Féin. That figure only accounts for 48 seats that they won because in 25 of the other constituencies the other parties did not contest them, and Sinn Féin won them unopposed. Most of these constituencies were Sinn Féin strongholds. It has been estimated that, had the 25 seats been contested, Sinn Féin would have received at least 53% of the vote island-wide. However, this is a conservative estimate and the percentage would likely have been higher. Sinn Féin also did not contest four seats due to a deal with the IPP (see below). Labour, who had pulled out in the south under instructions to 'wait', polled better in Belfast than Sinn Féin. Within the 26 counties that became the Irish Free State, Sinn Féin achieved 400,269 votes in the contested seats out of 606,117 total votes cast which amounted to a huge landslide of 66.0% in the vote and winning 70 out of the 75 constituencies.

The Irish Unionist Party won 22 seats and 25.3% of the vote island-wide (29.2% when Labour Unionist candidates are included), becoming the second-largest party in terms of MPs. The success of the unionists, who won 26 seats overall, was largely limited to Ulster. Otherwise, southern unionists were elected only in the constituencies of Rathmines and Dublin University which returned two. In the 26 counties that later became the Irish Free State and then the Republic of Ireland, the Irish Unionist Alliance polled 37,218 votes from 101,839 total votes cast for other parties in the constituencies that they stood a candidate. However, if all of the total votes in the contested seats where the Irish Unionist Alliance did not stand are included there was a total of 606,117 votes cast, which converts the Irish Unionist Alliance share of the vote in the 26 counties to just 6.1%. With the one Independent Unionist being elected for Dublin University adding 0.1% in total with 793 votes to give 6.2% across the 26 counties and only 3 seats won by the Unionists.

The IPP suffered a catastrophic defeat including the loss of its leader, John Dillon. It won only six seats in Ireland, its losses exaggerated by the "first-past-the-post" system which gave it a share of seats far short of its much larger share of the vote (21.7%) and the number of seats it would have won under a "proportional representation" ballot system. All but one of its seats were in Ulster. The exception was Waterford City, the seat previously held by John Redmond, who had died earlier in the year, and retained by his son Captain William Redmond. Four of their Ulster seats were part of the deal to avoid unionist victories which saved some for the party but may have cost it the support of Protestant voters elsewhere. The IPP came close to winning other seats in County Louth and Wexford South, and in general their support held up better in the north and east of the island. The party was represented in Westminster by seven MPs because T. P. O'Connor won the Liverpool Scotland seat he had held since the 1885 election due to Irish emigrant votes. The remnants of the IPP in time became the Nationalist Party of Northern Ireland under the leadership of Joseph Devlin. In the 26 counties that became the Irish Free State, the Irish Parliamentary Party won 181,320 votes out of 606,117 total votes cast in the contested seats, amounting to a 26.0% vote share. If the Independent Home Rule Nationalists are included there were 11,162 votes which comes to 1.8% and a vote share of 27.8% for the Nationalists. The Irish Parliamentary Party held on to just 2 seats in the 26 counties that became Southern Ireland and then the Irish Free State.

==== Ulster ====
In Ulster (nine counties), Unionists won 23 out of the 38 seats with Sinn Féin gaining ten and the Irish Parliamentary Party five. There was a limited electoral pact brokered by Roman Catholic Cardinal Michael Logue in December between Sinn Féin and the Nationalist IPP in eight seats. However, it only concluded after nominations closed.

Sinn Féin instructed its supporters to vote IPP in Armagh South, despite no Unionist candidate (79 SF votes), Down South (33 SF votes for Éamon de Valera), Tyrone North-East (56 SF votes) and Donegal East (46 SF votes). The IPP instructed its supporters to vote Sinn Féin in Fermanagh South (132 IPP votes) which had no Unionist candidate, Londonderry City (120 IPP votes) where Eoin MacNeill narrowly beat the Unionist, and Tyrone North-West also against a Unionist but where no IPP candidate was nominated.

The discipline of voters, when faced with two rival nationalist candidates and with only a post-nomination pact, was impressive. The pact only broke down in Down East where a Unionist won as the IPP candidate refused to participate, thus splitting the Catholic nationalist vote.

There was no pact in Belfast Falls which Joe Devlin (IPP) won with 8,488 votes against 3,245 for Éamon de Valera (SF) although no Unionist stood. The only other Belfast seat contested by both nationalist parties was Duncairn against Edward Carson; otherwise, Sinn Féin stood alone in seven seats reaching double figures in two. Monaghan North was won by Sinn Féin's Ernest Blythe in a three-cornered fight against both IPP and Unionist candidates.

In the Monaghan South, and Donegal North, South and West seats, despite no Unionist standing, Sinn Féin won all four against IPP candidates.

Sinn Féin took the two (uncontested) Cavan seats with Arthur Griffith taking his second in Cavan East as well as that of Tyrone North West.

In six contested seats no Unionist stood.

Unionists won a clear majority of the 38 Ulster seats including eight of the nine in Belfast. In the six Ulster counties which formed the future Northern Ireland, Unionists won 23 of the 30 seats. The vote totals were:

Results in (prospective) Northern Ireland, 1918
Party	Votes	% Votes	Seats	% Seats
Irish Unionist	225,082	56.2	20	69.0
Sinn Féin	76,100	19.0	3	6.9
Irish Parliamentary	44,238	11.1	4	13.8
Labour Unionist	30,304	7.6	3	10.3
Belfast Labour	12,164	3.0	0	—
Ind. Unionist	8,738	2.2	0	—
Ind. Nationalist	2,602	0.6	0	—
Independent Labour	659	0.2	0	—
Independent	436	0.1	0	—
Total	400,323		30	

== Aftermath and legacy ==
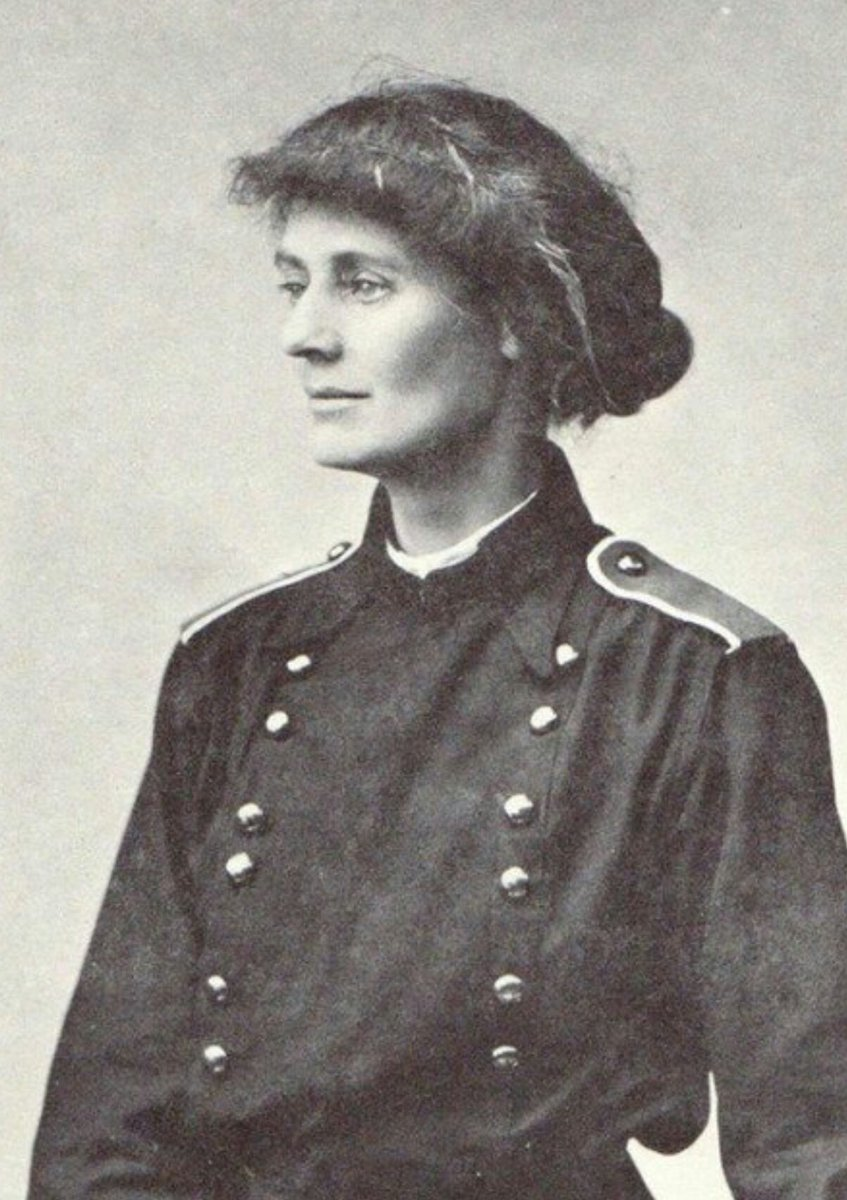
Constance Markievicz was the first woman ever to be elected to the British House of Commons. She did not take her seat, instead sitting in the First Dáil. In 1919 she was appointed Minister for Labour, the first female minister in a democratic government cabinet.

On 21 January 1919, 27 (out of 101 elected) members representing thirty constituencies answered the roll of Dáil Éireann—the Irish for "Assembly of Ireland". Invitations to attend the Dáil had been sent to all 100 men and one woman who had been elected on 14 December 1918. Eoin MacNeill had been elected for both Londonderry City and the National University of Ireland. Thirty-three republicans were unable to attend as they were in prison, most of them without trial since 17 May 1918. Pierce McCan (of East Tipperary), who died in prison, would have brought the total to thirty-four. Of the 69 republicans elected, most had fought in the Easter Rising.

In accordance with the Sinn Féin manifesto, their elected members refused to attend Westminster, having instead formed their own parliament. Dáil Éireann was, according to John Patrick McCarthy, the revolutionary government under which the Irish War of Independence was fought and which sought international recognition. Maryann Gialanella Valiulis says that having justified its existence, the Dáil provided itself with a theoretical framework and set about the process of state-building.

After having dominated Irish politics for four decades, the IPP was so decimated by its massive defeat that it dissolved soon after the election. As mentioned above, its remains became the Northern Ireland-based Nationalist Party, which survived in Northern Ireland until 1969.

The British administration and unionists refused to recognise the Dáil. At its first meeting attended by 27 deputies (others were still imprisoned or impaired) on 21 January 1919 the Dáil issued a Declaration of Independence and proclaimed itself the parliament of a new state, the Irish Republic.

On the same day, in unconnected circumstances, two members of the Royal Irish Constabulary guarding gelignite were killed in the Soloheadbeg Ambush by members of the Irish Volunteers. Although it had not ordered this incident, the course of events soon drove the Dáil to recognise the Volunteers as the army of the Irish Republic and the ambush as an act of war against Great Britain. The Volunteers therefore changed their name, in August, to the Irish Republican Army.

The train of events set in motion by the elections would eventually bring about the creation of the Irish Free State as a British dominion in 1922. That state became the first internationally recognised independent Irish state in 1931, when the Statute of Westminster removed virtually all of the UK Parliament's remaining authority over the Free State and the other dominions. The Free State eventually evolved into the modern Republic of Ireland. The leaders of the Sinn Féin candidates elected in 1918, such as de Valera, Michael Collins and W. T. Cosgrave, came to dominate Irish politics. De Valera, for example, would hold some form of elected office from his first election as an MP in a by-election in 1917 until 1973. The two major parties in the Republic of Ireland today, Fianna Fáil and Fine Gael, are both descendants of Sinn Féin, which first enjoyed substantial electoral success in 1918.

== See also ==
- 1918 United Kingdom general election in England
- 1918 United Kingdom general election in Scotland
- 1918 United Kingdom general election in Wales
- List of United Kingdom Parliament constituencies (1885–1918) by region
- History of Ireland (1801–1923)
