= 1890 West Cavan by-election =

UK Parliamentary by-election

A parliamentary by-election was held for the United Kingdom House of Commons constituency of West Cavan on 26 March 1890. The election was caused by the death of the sitting member, Joseph Biggar of the Irish National Federation. Only one candidate was nominated, Edmund Vesey Knox of the Irish National Federation, and he was elected unopposed.
