= 1895 West Cavan by-election =

UK Parliamentary by-election

The 1895 West Cavan by-election was a parliamentary by-election held for the United Kingdom House of Commons constituency of West Cavan on 22 August 1895. The sitting member, Edmund Vesey Knox of the Irish National Federation, who had sat for the constituency since a by-election in 1890, had been re-elected in the general election of 1895. However, having been elected also for the constituency of Londonderry City, he chose to sit for that constituency instead. The West Cavan seat thus became vacant, and in the ensuing by-election, another Irish National Federation candidate, J. P. Farrell, was elected unopposed.

By-election 2 August 1895: Cavan West
Party	Candidate	Votes	%	±%
Irish National Federation	J. P. Farrell	Unopposed	N/A	N/A
Irish National Federation hold				
