= 1907 South Westmeath by-election =

UK Parliamentary by-election

The 1907 South Westmeath by-election was held on 13 April 1907. The by-election was held due to the death of the incumbent Irish Parliamentary MP, Donal Sullivan. It was won by the Irish Parliamentary candidate Sir Walter Nugent, 4th Baronet, who was unopposed.
