= North Longford =

UK parliamentary constituency in Ireland, 1885–1918

- Former county constituency for the House of Commons

1885–1918
- Seats: 1
- Created from: County Longford
- Replaced by: County Longford

North Longford was a UK parliamentary constituency in Ireland. It returned one Member of Parliament (MP) to the British House of Commons from 1885 to 1918.

Prior to the 1885 United Kingdom general election and after the dissolution of Parliament in 1918 the area was part of the County Longford constituency.

== Boundaries ==
This constituency comprised the northern part of County Longford.

1885–1918: The barony of Granard, that part of the barony of Longford consisting of the parish of Killoe and the townland of Kiltyreher in the parish of Templemichael, and that part of the barony of Ardagh contained within the parishes of Mostrim and Street, the townlands of Cartronreagh and Rinvanny in the parish of Clonbroney, and the townland of Castlenugent in the parish of Granard.

== Members of Parliament ==
Election	Member	Party
1885	Justin McCarthy	Irish Parliamentary
1887	Tim Healy	Irish Parliamentary
1891	Tim Healy	Irish National Federation
1892	Justin McCarthy	Irish National Federation
1900	J. P. Farrell	Irish Parliamentary
1918	Constituency abolished: see County Longford	

== Elections ==
=== Elections in the 1880s ===
General election 2 December 1885: Longford North
Party	Candidate	Votes	%	±%
Irish Parliamentary	Justin McCarthy	2,549	94.0	
Irish Conservative	James Mackay Wilson	163	6.0	
Majority		2,386	88.0	
Turnout		2,712	73.0	
Registered electors		3,714		
Irish Parliamentary win (new seat)				

General election 8 July 1886: Longford North
Party	Candidate	Votes	%	±%
Irish Parliamentary	Justin McCarthy	Unopposed		
Registered electors		3,714		
Irish Parliamentary hold				

McCarthy is also elected MP for Londonderry City and opts to sit there, causing a by-election.

By-election 5 February 1887: Longford North
Party	Candidate	Votes	%	±%
Irish Parliamentary	Tim Healy	Unopposed		
Registered electors		4,375		
Irish Parliamentary hold				

=== Elections in the 1890s ===
General election 15 July 1892: Longford North
Party	Candidate	Votes	%	±%
Irish National Federation	Justin McCarthy	2,741	93.1	N/A
Irish Unionist	James Mackay Wilson	203	6.9	New
Majority		2,538	86.2	N/A
Turnout		2,944	64.2	N/A
Registered electors		4,589		
Irish National Federation gain from Irish Parliamentary		Swing	N/A	

General election 16 July 1895: Longford North
Party	Candidate	Votes	%	±%
Irish National Federation	Justin McCarthy	Unopposed		
Registered electors		4,442		
Irish National Federation hold				

=== Elections in the 1900s ===
General election 5 October 1900: Longford North
Party	Candidate	Votes	%	±%
Irish Parliamentary	J. P. Farrell	Unopposed		
Registered electors		4,395		
Irish Parliamentary hold				

General election 16 January 1906: Longford North
Party	Candidate	Votes	%	±%
Irish Parliamentary	J. P. Farrell	Unopposed		
Registered electors		3,669		
Irish Parliamentary hold				

=== Elections in the 1910s ===
General election 19 January 1910: Longford North
Party	Candidate	Votes	%	±%
Irish Parliamentary	J. P. Farrell	Unopposed		
Registered electors		3,632		
Irish Parliamentary hold				

General election 7 December 1910: Longford North
Party	Candidate	Votes	%	±%
Irish Parliamentary	J. P. Farrell	Unopposed		
Registered electors		3,632		
Irish Parliamentary hold				
