= Obstructionism =

Deliberately delaying or preventing a process or change

Obstructionism is the practice of deliberately delaying, preventing or abusing a process.

== In politics ==
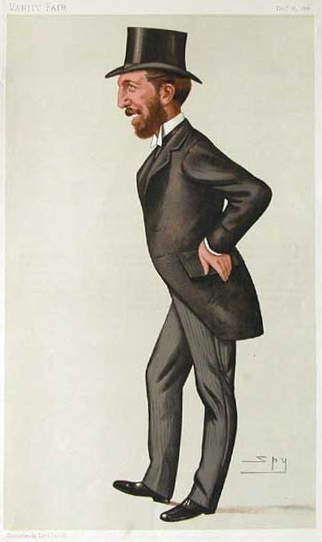
John O'Connor Power "the brains of Obstruction" Caricature by "Spy" (Leslie Ward) in Vanity Fair, 25 December 1886

Obstructionism or policy of obstruction denotes the deliberate interference with the parliamentary procedure by various means such as the filibuster which consists of extending the debate upon a proposal in order to delay or completely prevent a vote on its passage.

Another form of parliamentary obstruction practiced in the United States and other countries is called "slow walking". It specifically refers to the extremely slow speed with which legislators walk to the podium to cast their ballots. For example, in Japan this tactic is known as a "cow walk", and in Hawaii it is known as a "Devil's Gambit". Consequently, slow walking is also used as a synonym for obstructionism itself.

Obstructionism can also take the form of widespread agreement to oppose policies from the other side of a political debate or dispute.

=== Notable obstructionists ===
John O'Connor Power, Joe Biggar, Frank Hugh O'Donnell, and Charles Stewart Parnell, Irish nationalists; all were famous for making long speeches in the British House of Commons. In a letter to Cardinal Cullen, 6 August 1877, The O'Donoghue, MP for County Kerry, denounced the obstruction policy: "It is Fenianism in a new form." The tactic deadlocked legislation and 'the autumn Session of 1882 was entirely devoted to the reform of the Rules of Procedure with a view to facilitating the despatch of business' — this was the introduction of the Cloture motion. Sir Leslie Ward's "Spy" cartoon of John O'Connor Power appeared in Vanity Fair's "Men of the Day" series, 25 December 1886, and was captioned "the brains of Obstruction".

Mitch McConnell, a United States Senator, has been described as an obstructionist for his Filibuster in the United States Senate of federal judge nominations. He has referred to himself as the "Grim Reaper" of the Democratic agenda.

=== Mass media ===
In September 2010, Jon Stewart of The Daily Show announced the Rally to Restore Sanity and/or Fear, an event dedicated to ending political obstructionism in American mass media.

"We're looking for the people who think shouting is annoying, counterproductive, and terrible for your throat; who feel that the loudest voices shouldn't be the only ones that get heard; and who believe that the only time it's appropriate to draw a Hitler mustache on someone is when that person is actually Hitler. Or Charlie Chaplin in certain roles."

== As workplace aggression ==
An obstructionist causes problems. Neuman and Baron (1998) identify obstructionism as one of the three dimensions that encompass the range of workplace aggression. In this context, obstructionism refers to "behaviors intended to hinder an employee from performing their job or the organization from accomplishing its objectives".

== In rule of law ==
Perverting the course of justice is an offence committed when a person interferes with the administration of justice. In England and Wales it is a common law offence, carrying a maximum sentence of life imprisonment. Statutory versions of the offence exist in Australia, Canada, Fiji, Ireland, and New Zealand. The Scottish equivalent is defeating the ends of justice, although charges of attempting to pervert the course of justice are also raised in Scotland, while the South African counterpart is defeating or obstructing the course of justice. A similar concept, obstruction of justice, exists in United States law.

== See also ==
- Government failure
- Judicial reform
- Judicial review
- Jury tampering
- Justice delayed is justice denied
- Law reform
- Liberum veto
- Political corruption
- Quorum-busting
- Right to an effective remedy
- Statute of limitations
