= Edmund Vesey Knox =

Irish nationalist politician

Edmund Francis Vesey Knox (23 January 1865 – 15 May 1921) was an Irish nationalist politician of Ulster-Scots descent. Initially a member of the Irish Parliamentary Party, he sided with the Anti-Parnellite Irish National Federation majority when the party split in 1891.

== Early life ==
Knox was born in Newcastle, County Down, the eldest son of the Vesey Edmund Knox and Margaret Clarissa Garrett. His younger brothers were Maj.-Gen. Sir Alfred Knox, a British Army officer and Conservative politician; and Gen. Sir Harry Knox, Adjutant-General to the Forces from 1935 to 1937.

Their great-grandfather Hon. Vesey Knox was the son of Thomas Knox, 1st Viscount Northland, and brother of Thomas Knox, 1st Earl of Ranfurly (1754–1840); Maj.-Gen. Hon. John Knox (1758–1800), Governor of Jamaica; William Knox (1762–1831), Bishop of Derry; George Knox (1765–1827), MP for Dublin University; Charles Knox (1770–1825), Archdeacon of Armagh; and Edmund Knox (1772–1849), Bishop of Limerick.

== Education and career ==
Knox was educated at St Columba's College, Dublin and Keble College, Oxford. He was a barrister and member of Gray's Inn and Middle Temple. He became a Bencher at Gray's Inn 1906; Treasurer 1913, and Fellow at All Souls College, Oxford in 1886.

Knox was elected as Member of Parliament (MP) for West Cavan at an unopposed by-election on 26 March 1890, following the death of the nationalist MP Joseph Biggar, taking his seat in the House of Commons of the United Kingdom of Great Britain and Ireland.

He was re-elected as an Irish National Federation MP at the 1892 general election, with a majority of more than three-to-one over his sole opponent, a Unionist. At the 1895 election he was again returned unopposed in West Cavan, but also stood in Londonderry City, winning that seat by a slender majority over his unionist opponent. He chose to sit for Londonderry City, and held that seat until he resigned from Parliament on 9 December 1898 by becoming Steward of the Manor of Northstead.

== Personal life ==
Knox married firstly Annie Elizabeth Lloyd (died 1907), daughter of William Lloyd of Llanmaes, Glamorgan, and had a daughter and three sons.

- Lt. John Vesey Knox (1892–1918), killed in an accident while an instructor for the Royal Flying Corps during the First World War
- Capt. Columb "Collie" Thomas Knox (1897–1977), journalist and pilot
- Dilys Myfanwy Knox (1899–1990), married firstly Lt.-Col. David Charles Gilbert Dickinson (died 1943) and secondly Lt.-Col. Arthur Joseph Sullivan OBE
- Lt. Noel Lloyd Knox (1906–1962), member of the Ulster Special Constabulary

Parliament of the United Kingdom
Preceded by Joseph Biggar	Member of Parliament for West Cavan; 1890 – 1895	Succeeded by J. P. Farrell
Preceded by John Ross	Member of Parliament for Londonderry City; 1895 – 1898	Succeeded by Arthur John Moore
