= J. P. Farrell =

Irish politician (1865–1921)

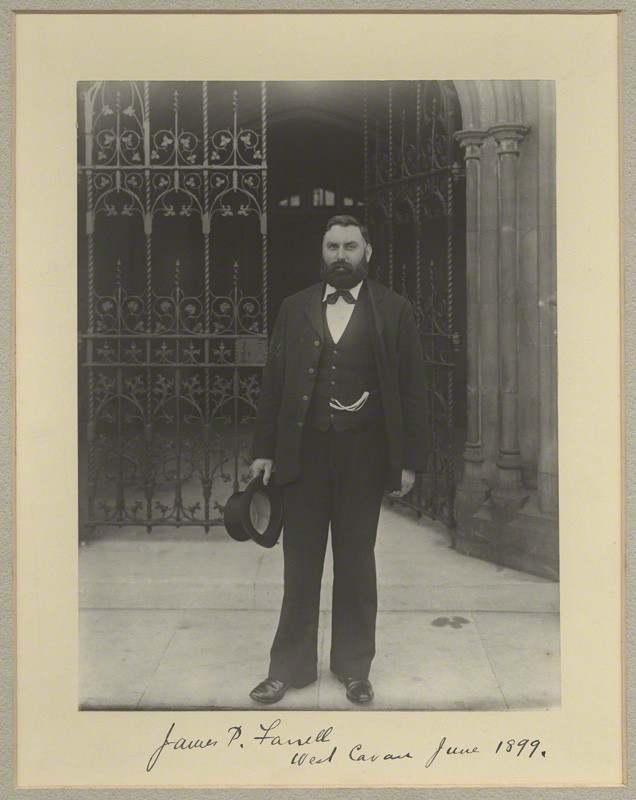
James Patrick Farrell, June 1899

James Patrick Farrell (13 May 1865 – 11 December 1921) was an Irish nationalist politician and Member of Parliament (MP) from 1895 to 1918, taking his seat in the House of Commons of the United Kingdom of Great Britain and Ireland. He was also founder (with fellow Nationalist M.P. Jasper Tully), owner and editor of the Longford Leader newspaper.

== Biography ==
Farrell was born in Longford on 13 May 1865, the son of Patrick Farrell of Longford, and Anne (née Lynam) of Strokestown, Co. Roscommon. He attended St. Mel's College, Longford. In 1888, he married Bride Fitzgerald, and they had five sons and two daughters.

An active campaigner on land and tenancy reform, Farrell was arrested and imprisoned for two months in 1889 over a speech deemed to be agitation. He stood as an Anti-Parnellite Irish National Federation candidate at the 1895 general election in Kilkenny City, where the outgoing Anti-Parnellite MP Thomas Curran was not standing again. Farrell lost narrowly to the Parnellite candidate, Patrick O'Brien by a margin of only 667 votes to 681. A vacancy arose immediately in West Cavan, where Edmund Vesey Knox the MP since 1890, was re-elected 1895 but also won a seat in Londonderry City, and chose to sit for the latter. The resulting by-election in West Cavan was held on 2 August 1895, and Farell was elected unopposed in the first by-election of that Parliament.

Farrell was a fervent supporter of land reform and spoke and wrote frequently on the subject. He was imprisoned four times between 1890 and 1910 and during his last imprisonment in Kilmainham Gaol contracted an illness which may have led to his death, aged 56, in 1921.

When the split in the Irish Parliamentary Party was resolved in time for the 1900 general election, Farrell did not seek re-election in Cavan, but stood instead in North Longford, where he was returned unopposed. He was re-elected unopposed in 1906, and at both elections in 1910, but at the 1918 general election he was heavily defeated in the new County Longford constituency by the Sinn Féin candidate Joseph McGuinness.

Parliament of the United Kingdom
Preceded by Edmund Vesey Knox	Member of Parliament for West Cavan; August 1895 – 1900	Succeeded by Thomas McGovern
Preceded by Justin McCarthy	Member of Parliament for North Longford; 1900 – 1918	Constituency abolished
