= East Waterford =

Former parliamentary constituency in the United Kingdom

- Former county constituency for the House of Commons

1885–1918
- Seats: 1
- Created from: County Waterford
- Replaced by: County Waterford

East Waterford was a United Kingdom Parliament constituency in Ireland, returning one Member of Parliament from 1885 to 1918.

Prior to the 1885 United Kingdom general election and after the dissolution of Parliament in 1918 the area was part of the County Waterford constituency.

== Boundaries ==
This constituency comprised the eastern part of County Waterford. It included the baronies of Gaultiere, Glenahiry, Middlethird, and Upperthird, and that part of the barony of Decies-without-Drum contained within the parishes of Ballylaneen, Clonea (excluding the townlands of Ballyrandle and Kilgrovan), Fews, Kilbarrymeaden, Kilrossanty, Monksland, Rossmire and Stradbally, and the townland of Lishane in the parish of Newcastle.

== Members of Parliament ==
Election	Member	Party
1885	Patrick Joseph Power	Nationalist
1892	Patrick Joseph Power	Anti-Parnellite Nationalist
1900	Patrick Joseph Power	Nationalist
1913	Martin Joseph Murphy	Nationalist
1918	Constituency abolished – see County Waterford	

== Elections ==
=== Elections in the 1880s ===
1885 general election: East Waterford
Party	Candidate	Votes	%	±%
Irish Parliamentary	Patrick Joseph Power	3,291	91.3	
Irish Loyal and Patriotic Union	William Gervase de la Poer	314	8.7	
Majority		2,977	82.6	
Turnout		3,605	63.5	
Registered electors		5,678		
Irish Parliamentary win (new seat)				

1886 general election: East Waterford
Party	Candidate	Votes	%	±%
Irish Parliamentary	Patrick Joseph Power	Unopposed		
Registered electors		5,678		
Irish Parliamentary hold				

=== Elections in the 1890s ===
1892 general election: East Waterford
Party	Candidate	Votes	%	±%
Irish National Federation	Patrick Joseph Power	2,562	71.1	N/A
Irish National League	Edmund Leamy	1,043	28.9	N/A
Majority		1,519	42.2	N/A
Turnout		3,605	56.2	N/A
Registered electors		6,411		
Irish National Federation gain from Irish Parliamentary		Swing	N/A	

1895 general election: East Waterford
Party	Candidate	Votes	%	±%
Irish National Federation	Patrick Joseph Power	Unopposed		
Registered electors		5,704		
Irish National Federation hold				

=== Elections in the 1900s ===
1900 general election: East Waterford
Party	Candidate	Votes	%	±%
Irish Parliamentary	Patrick Joseph Power	Unopposed		
Registered electors		4,922		
Irish Parliamentary hold				

1906 general election: East Waterford
Party	Candidate	Votes	%	±%
Irish Parliamentary	Patrick Joseph Power	Unopposed		
Registered electors		4,042		
Irish Parliamentary hold				

=== Elections in the 1910s ===
January 1910 general election: East Waterford
Party	Candidate	Votes	%	±%
Irish Parliamentary	Patrick Joseph Power	Unopposed		
Registered electors		4,216		
Irish Parliamentary hold				

December 1910 general election: East Waterford
Party	Candidate	Votes	%	±%
Irish Parliamentary	Patrick Joseph Power	Unopposed		
Registered electors		4,216		
Irish Parliamentary hold				

Power's death causes a by-election.

By-election, 1913: East Waterford
Party	Candidate	Votes	%	±%
Irish Parliamentary	Martin Joseph Murphy	Unopposed		
Registered electors		4,229		
Irish Parliamentary hold				
