= Collie Knox =

British author and journalist (1897–1977)

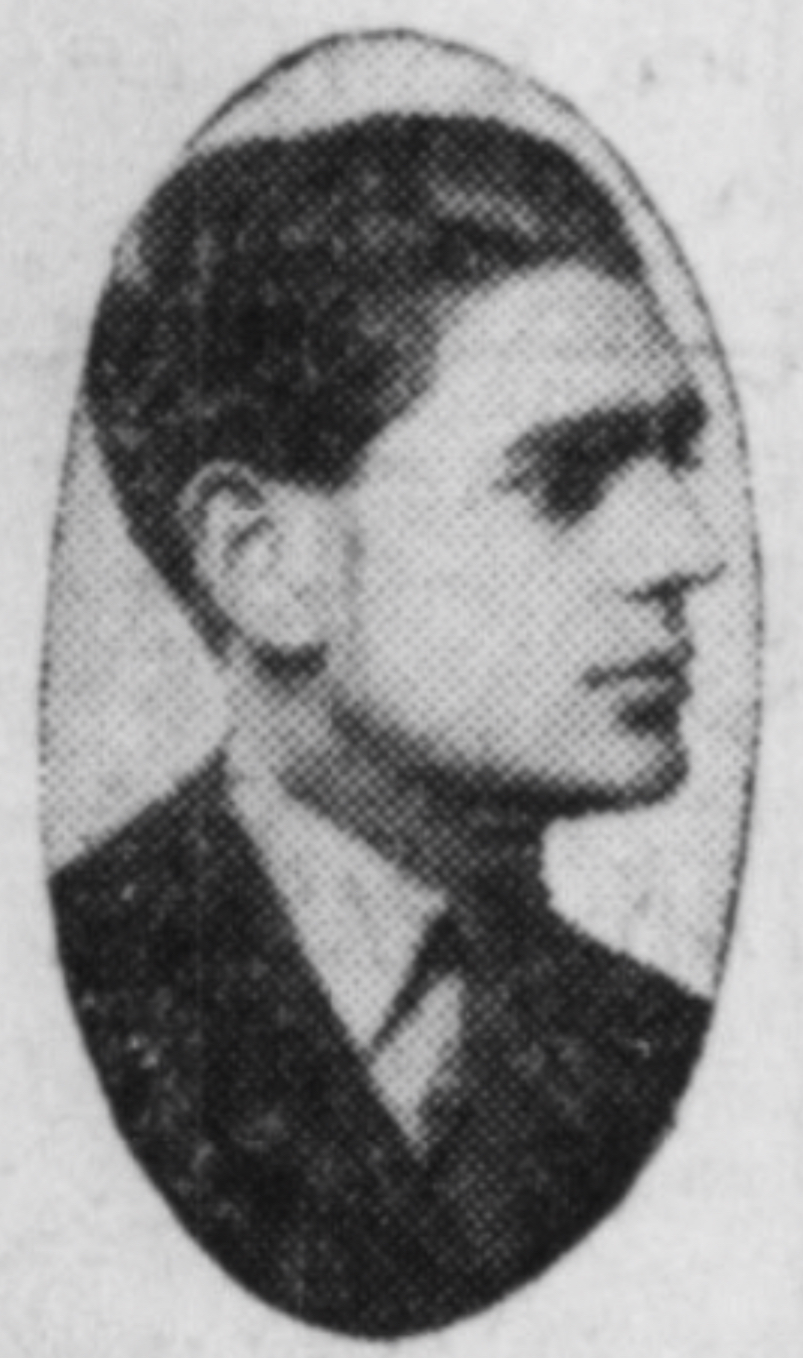
Daily Express (1931)

Capt. Columb "Collie" Thomas Knox (13 March 1897 – 3 May 1977) was a British writer and journalist active during World War II and the 1950s. After a varied military career, he joined the Daily Express before switching to the Daily Mail, which promoted him as a star journalist.

== Early life and education ==
Knox was born in London, the second son of Irish politician Edmund Vesey Knox M.P. and Annie Elizabeth Lloyd from Llanmaes, Glamorgan. He was of Ulster Scots descent, the great-great-grandson of Thomas Knox, 1st Viscount Northland. His uncles were Sir Alfred Knox and Sir Harry Knox.

He was educated at Rugby School and the Royal Military College, Sandhurst. He served in the Royal Flying Corps during the First World War. His elder brother Lt. John Vesey Knox (1892–1918) was killed in an accident while an instructor for the RFC.

== Personal life ==
In 1944, he married Gwendoline Frances Mary Mitchell, but they divorced in 1948.

For a time, he shared a flat in Brighton with landscape designer Peter Coats, and together with Sir David Webster, Robin Maugham, Douglas Byng, and others, became slightly notorious as one of that town's homosexual celebrities.

== Books ==
- Collie Knox Calling! A Selection of the famous Friday "Week-end" broadcasts now appearing in the Daily Mail, Chapman and Hall, (1937)
- Collie Knox Again, Chapman and Hall, (1938).
- It Might Have Been You, Chapman & Hall, (1939).
- Heroes All, Hodder & Stoughton, (1941).
- Atlantic Battle (1941).
- It had to be me , Methuen & Co., (1947).
- The Un-Beaten Track, Cassell and Company, (1944).
