= West Cavan =

UK parliamentary constituency in Ireland, 1885–1922

- Former county constituency for the House of Commons

1885–1922
- Seats: 1
- Created from: County Cavan
- Replaced by: Cavan

West Cavan was a parliamentary constituency in Ireland, which from 1885 to 1922 returned one Member of Parliament (MP) to the House of Commons of the United Kingdom of Great Britain and Ireland.

Prior to 1885 the area was part of the County Cavan constituency. After 1922, on the establishment of the Irish Free State, the area was not represented in the UK Parliament.

== Boundaries ==
This constituency comprised the western part of County Cavan, consisting of the baronies of Clanmahon, Loughtee Lower, Tullyhaw and Tullyhunco, that part of the barony of Loughtee Upper contained within the parishes of Annagelliff, Castleterra, Kilmore and Urney and the townland of Crumlin in the parish of Denn, and that part of the barony of Tullygarvey contained within the parish of Annagh.

== Members of Parliament ==
Election	Member	Party
1885	Joseph Biggar	Nationalist
1890(b)	Edmund Vesey Knox	Nationalist
1892	Edmund Vesey Knox	Irish National Federation (Anti-Parnellite)
1895(b)	J. P. Farrell	Irish National Federation (Anti-Parnellite)
1900	Thomas McGovern	Nationalist
1904(b)	Vincent Kennedy	Nationalist
1918	Peter Paul Galligan	Sinn Féin
1922	Constituency abolished: See Cavan (Dáil constituency).	

== Elections ==
=== Elections in the 1880s ===
General election 8 December 1885: West Cavan
Party	Candidate	Votes	%	±%
Irish Parliamentary	Joseph Biggar	6,425	78.3	
Irish Conservative	Samuel Saunderson	1,779	21.7	
Majority		4,646	56.6	
Turnout		8,204	81.2	
Registered electors		10,109		
Irish Parliamentary win (new seat)				

General election 8 July 1886: West Cavan
Party	Candidate	Votes	%	±%
Irish Parliamentary	Joseph Biggar	Unopposed		
Registered electors		10,109		
Irish Parliamentary hold				

=== Elections in the 1890s ===
By-election 26 March 1890: Cavan West
Party	Candidate	Votes	%	±%
Irish Parliamentary	Edmund Vesey Knox	Unopposed		
Registered electors		11,496		
Irish Parliamentary hold				

General election 14 July 1892: Cavan West
Party	Candidate	Votes	%	±%
Irish National Federation	Edmund Vesey Knox	6,458	76.8	N/A
Irish Unionist	Nugent Talbot Everard	1,950	23.2	New
Majority		4,508	53.6	N/A
Turnout		8,408	77.5	N/A
Registered electors		10,856		
Irish National Federation gain from Irish Parliamentary		Swing	N/A	

General election 16 July 1895: Cavan West
Party	Candidate	Votes	%	±%
Irish National Federation	Edmund Vesey Knox	Unopposed		
Registered electors		10,439		
Irish National Federation hold				

By-election 2 August 1895: Cavan West
Party	Candidate	Votes	%	±%
Irish National Federation	J. P. Farrell	Unopposed		
Registered electors		10,439		
Irish National Federation hold				

=== Elections in the 1900s ===
General election 4 October 1900: Cavan West
Party	Candidate	Votes	%	±%
Irish Parliamentary	Thomas McGovern	Unopposed		
Registered electors		9,944		
Irish Parliamentary hold				

By-election 11 June 1904: Cavan West
Party	Candidate	Votes	%	±%
Irish Parliamentary	Vincent Kennedy	Unopposed		
Registered electors		9,119		
Irish Parliamentary hold				

General election 16 January 1906: Cavan West
Party	Candidate	Votes	%	±%
Irish Parliamentary	Vincent Kennedy	Unopposed		
Registered electors		8,897		
Irish Parliamentary hold				

=== Elections in the 1910s ===
General election 18 January 1910: Cavan West
Party	Candidate	Votes	%	±%
Irish Parliamentary	Vincent Kennedy	Unopposed		
Registered electors		8,605		
Irish Parliamentary hold				

General election 5 December 1910: Cavan West
Party	Candidate	Votes	%	±%
Irish Parliamentary	Vincent Kennedy	Unopposed		
Registered electors		8,605		
Irish Parliamentary hold				

General Election 14 December 1918: Cavan West
Party	Candidate	Votes	%	±%
Sinn Féin	Peter Paul Galligan	Unopposed		
Registered electors		22,270		
Sinn Féin gain from Irish Parliamentary				
