= South Westmeath =

UK parliamentary constituency in Ireland, 1885–1918

- Former county constituency for the House of Commons

1885–1918
- Seats: 1
- Created from: Athlone; County Westmeath
- Replaced by: County Westmeath

South Westmeath was a constituency in Ireland, returning one Member of Parliament to the United Kingdom House of Commons from 1885 to 1918.

Prior to the 1885 general election and after the dissolution of Parliament in 1918 the area was part of the County Westmeath constituency.

== Boundaries ==
This constituency comprised the southern part of County Westmeath.

1885–1918: The baronies of Brawny, Clonlonan, Kilkenny West, Moycashel and Rathconrath, that part of the barony of Fartullagh not contained within the constituency of North Westmeath, that part of the barony of Moyashel and Magheradernon contained within the parish of Dysart (excluding the townlands of Ballyote, Slanebeg and Slanemore), and that part of the barony of Moyguish contained within the parish of Kilmacnevan.

== Members of Parliament ==
Years	Member	Party
1885–1890	Donal Sullivan	Irish Parliamentary Party
1891–1900	Donal Sullivan	Irish National Federation
1900–1907	Donal Sullivan	Irish Parliamentary Party
1907–1918	Sir Walter Nugent, Bt.	Irish Parliamentary Party

== Elections ==
=== Elections in the 1880s ===
1885 general election: South Westmeath
Party	Candidate	Votes	%	±%
Irish Parliamentary	Donal Sullivan	3,618	94.8	
Irish Loyal and Patriotic Union	Herman Smith	200	5.2	
Majority		3,418	89.6	
Turnout		3,818	70.5	
Registered electors		5,419		
Irish Parliamentary win (new seat)				

1886 general election: South Westmeath
Party	Candidate	Votes	%	±%
Irish Parliamentary	Donal Sullivan	Unopposed		
Registered electors		5,419		
Irish Parliamentary hold				

=== Elections in the 1890s ===
1892 general election: South Westmeath
Party	Candidate	Votes	%	±%
Irish National Federation	Donal Sullivan	2,535	70.1	N/A
Irish National League	Charles O'Donoghue	1,080	29.9	N/A
Majority		1,455	40.2	N/A
Turnout		3,615	68.2	N/A
Registered electors		5,304		
Irish National Federation gain from Irish Parliamentary		Swing	N/A	

1895 general election: South Westmeath
Party	Candidate	Votes	%	±%
Irish National Federation	Donal Sullivan	Unopposed		
Registered electors		5,280		
Irish National Federation hold				

=== Elections in the 1900s ===
1900 general election: South Westmeath
Party	Candidate	Votes	%	±%
Irish Parliamentary	Donal Sullivan	Unopposed		
Registered electors		6,600		
Irish Parliamentary hold				

1906 general election: South Westmeath
Party	Candidate	Votes	%	±%
Irish Parliamentary	Donal Sullivan	Unopposed		
Registered electors		5,379		
Irish Parliamentary hold				

Sullivan's death causes a by-election.

By-election, 1907: South Westmeath
Party	Candidate	Votes	%	±%
Irish Parliamentary	Walter Nugent	Unopposed		
Registered electors		5,958		
Irish Parliamentary hold				

=== Elections in the 1910s ===
January 1910 general election: South Westmeath
Party	Candidate	Votes	%	±%
Irish Parliamentary	Walter Nugent	Unopposed		
Registered electors		6,755		
Irish Parliamentary hold				

December 1910 general election: South Westmeath
Party	Candidate	Votes	%	±%
Irish Parliamentary	Walter Nugent	Unopposed		
Registered electors		6,755		
Irish Parliamentary hold				
