= Martin Murphy (politician) =

Irish politician (1862–1919)

Martin Joseph Murphy (1862 – 4 September 1919) was an Irish nationalist politician and Member of Parliament (MP) in the House of Commons of the United Kingdom of Great Britain and Ireland.

He was elected unopposed as an Irish Parliamentary Party MP at East Waterford by-election on 15 February 1913, following the death of the incumbent Irish Parliamentary Party MP, Patrick Joseph Power. He did not contest the 1918 general election.

Parliament of the United Kingdom
Preceded by Patrick Joseph Power	Member of Parliament for East Waterford; 1913 – 1918	Constituency abolished
