= Thomas McGovern (politician) =

British politician

Thomas McGovern (1851 – 6 April 1904) was an Irish nationalist politician. At the 1900 general election on 5 October 1900 he was elected unopposed as the Irish Parliamentary Party Member of Parliament (MP) for West Cavan, taking his seat in the House of Commons of the United Kingdom of Great Britain and Ireland. He was born in February 1851 on his father's farm in Gortmore, Bawnboy, County Cavan. He was the fourth son of Brian McGovern, farmer and contractor of Gortmore and his wife Anne Hassard, the daughter of Jason Hassard. He was educated at Bawnboy National School and became an auctioneer and farmer. He was a justice of the peace and county councillor for County Cavan, a Poor Law Governor for Bawnboy Poor Law Union and a director of Cavan and Leitrim Railway. He represented County Cavan on the Council of Agriculture, under the Agricultural and Technical Instruction Act. He had been ailing for some months before his death at Gortmore on 6 April 1904, aged 53.

His younger brother was Fr. Bernard Magauran. Born 1858 of Bernard Magauran and Anne Hassard, Gortmore, Templeport parish. Ordained St. Patrick's College, Cavan 13 September 1885. Curate in Arva parish 1885; Denn 1886; Killinagh 1888; Cavan 1892.

Parliament of the United Kingdom
Preceded by J. P. Farrell	Member of Parliament for West Cavan; 1900 – 1904	Succeeded by Vincent Kennedy
