= Vincent Kennedy =

Irish politician (1876–1943)

Vincent Paul Kennedy (15 February 1876 – 18 November 1943) was an Irish nationalist politician. He was Member of Parliament (MP) for West Cavan from 1904 to 1918, taking his seat as an Irish Parliamentary Party member in the House of Commons of what was then the United Kingdom of Great Britain and Ireland.

Kennedy was elected unopposed at a by-election on 11 June 1904, following the death of West Cavan's MP Thomas McGovern. He was returned unopposed in 1906, and at both the January and December elections in 1910., but like most Irish Parliamentary Party MPs, he did not stand at the 1918 general election, leaving the Sinn Féin candidate to be elected unopposed.

Parliament of the United Kingdom
Preceded by Thomas McGovern	Member of Parliament for West Cavan; 1904 – 1918	Succeeded by Peter Paul Galligan
