= Patrick Power (East Waterford MP) =

Irish politician

Patrick Joseph Power (17 November 1850 – 8 January 1913) was an Irish Catholic landlord and MP. He was elected Home Rule MP for County Waterford in 1884. After division of the County Waterford constituency, he was MP for East Waterford from 1885 until his death in 1913.

== Life ==
The son of Pierce Power (died 1887) and Eliza Hayden, Patrick Joseph Power was educated at Stonyhurst College. He owned 3,418 acres in counties Waterford and Tipperary, valued at £1000.

== Death ==
He died at his residence at 13 Templeton Place, London.

Parliament of the United Kingdom
Preceded by John Aloysius Blake; Henry Villiers-Stuart	Member of Parliament for County Waterford; 1884–1885; With: Henry Villiers-Stuart	Constituency abolished
New constituency	Member of Parliament for East Waterford; 1885–1913	Succeeded by Martin Joseph Murphy
