= 1913 East Waterford by-election =

UK Parliamentary by-election

The 1913 East Waterford by-election was held on 15 February 1913. The by-election was held due to the death of the incumbent Irish Parliamentary MP, Patrick Joseph Power. It was won by the Irish Parliamentary candidate Martin Joseph Murphy, who was unopposed.
