= Joseph Biggar =

Irish nationalist politician (c. 1828–1890)

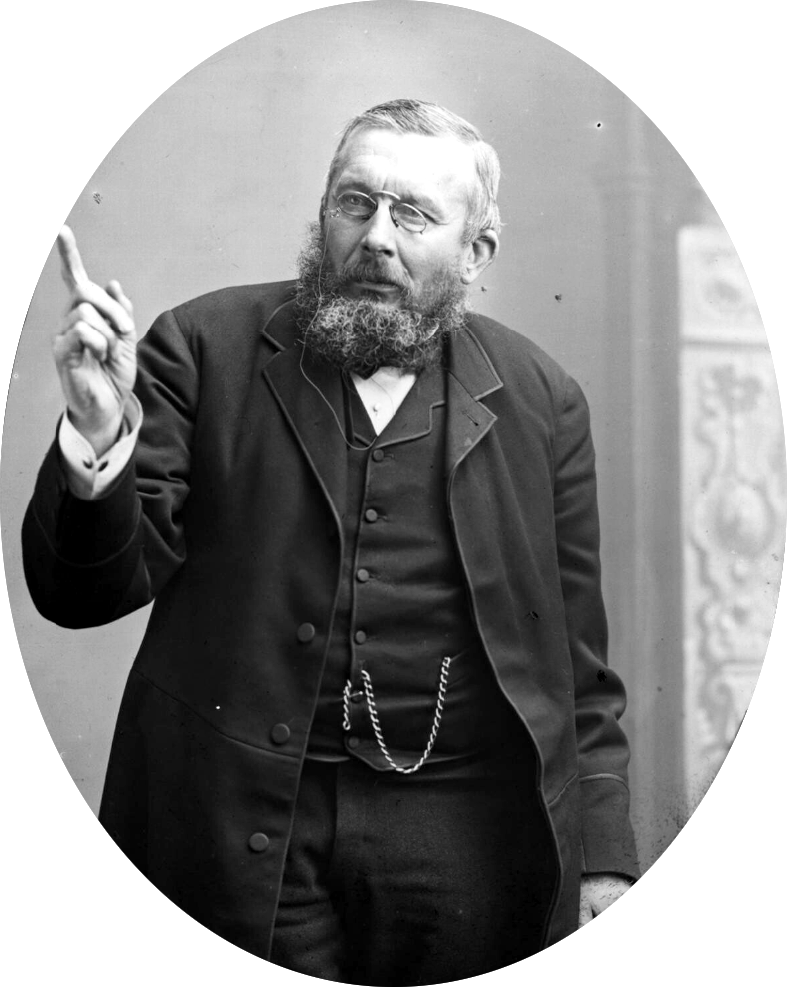
- Biggar, c. 1880s

Member of Parliament for West Cavan
- In office 1885–1890
- Preceded by: Constituency created
- Succeeded by: Edmund Vesey Knox

Member of Parliament for County Cavan
- In office 1874–1885
- Preceded by: Constituency disestablished

Personal details
- Born: 1828 Belfast, Ireland
- Died: 19 February 1890 (aged 62)
- Party: Irish Parliamentary Party
- Other political affiliations: Home Rule League (until 1882)
- Education: Belfast Royal Academy

Joseph Gillis Biggar (c. 1828 – 19 February 1890), commonly known as Joe Biggar or J. G. Biggar, was an Irish nationalist politician from Belfast. He served as an MP in the House of Commons of the United Kingdom of Great Britain and Ireland as member of the Home Rule League and later Irish Parliamentary Party for County Cavan from 1874 to 1885 and West Cavan from 1885 to his death in 1890. In the House of Commons, he was a pioneer and leader of Irish obstructionism.

== Origins ==
He was the eldest son of Joseph Bigger, merchant and chairman of the Ulster bank, by Isabella, daughter of William Houston of Ballyearl, Antrim. He was educated at the Belfast Academy, and, entering his father's business of a provision merchant, became head of the firm in 1861, and carried it on till 1880.

His surname was originally spelled Bigger, but he changed the spelling upon conversion and taking up his political career; which caused some confusion about his namesake (also a Protestant nationalist from Belfast, and Joseph Gillis' cousin once removed) Francis Joseph Bigger. He became a wealthy Belfast provision merchant and city councillor. He is believed to have converted to Catholicism in 1875 in solidarity with Irish nationalism. He lacked physical presence, being a 'diminutive hunchback'.

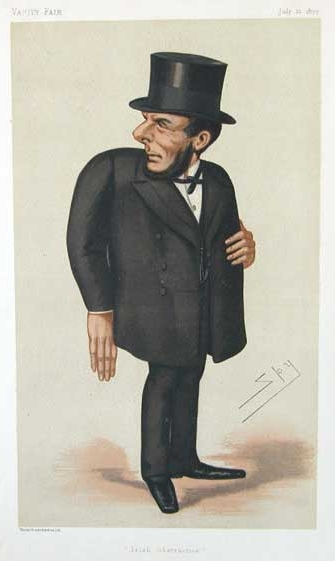
"Irish obstruction" Biggar as depicted by "Spy" (Leslie Ward) in Vanity Fair, 21 July 1877

From 1869 onwards, he took an active part in local politics at Belfast. In 1871, he was elected a town councillor, and he acted for several years as chairman of the Belfast Water Commission.

== Conversion to Catholicism ==
Biggar's parents were Presbyterians, but in 1877 he was formally received into the Roman Catholic Church. Biggar is reported to have said that he took Catholic communion to "annoy his sister". One biographer has opined that he converted to the majority church in Ireland "more from 'patriotic' than religious motivations".

Meeting Biggar in 1879 in Boulogne, John Devoy recalls bringing up the subject of his conversion to Catholicism:

[I said] I was sorry he had turned Catholic... Biggar asked sharply, "Why?" and I replied that he could be more useful as a Presbyterian. "Now", I said, "when young Protestants in Ulster showed a tendency towards Nationality their mothers would say to them: 'The next thing we'll know is that you've turned Papish like Joe Biggar'". "And what about my soul?" asked Biggar. "Oh, I'd be willing to see you damned for the sake of Ireland", I said jocularly. Biggar laughed and then... began a discussion of the Presbyterian doctrine of Predestination.

== Obstructionism ==
He is known for introducing in 1874 a new, more aggressive form of obstructionism in the British House of Commons. This new form was directed not just at the Government but at the institution of parliament itself, and lacked the previous traditional restraint exercised by oppositions who realised that they could expect like treatment when they attained government. This involved giving long speeches to delay passage (also known as filibustering) of Irish coercion acts and to generally obstruct the business of the House to force the Liberals and Conservatives to negotiate with Irish nationalists. Obstruction was opposed by Home Rule Party leader Isaac Butt but approved of by most Irish nationalists.

T. P. O'Connor refers to Biggar's attributes:

...the obstructionist wants, as a rule, strength of character rather than of oratory – as witness the extraordinary work in obstruction done by the late Mr. Biggar, who, by nature, was one of the most inarticulate of men. It was because Biggar had nerves of steel – a courage that did not know the meaning of fear, and that remained calm in the midst of a cyclone of repugnance, hatred, and menace...

...Joe Biggar, his [Parnell's] associate, was also able to speak in any circumstances with exactly the same ease of spirit. To him, speaking was but a means to an end, and whether people listened to him or not – stopped to hang on his words or fled before his grating voice and Ulster accent – it was all one to him.

The Freeman's Journal reported Biggar's obstruction of the Threshing Machines Bill on 27 February 1877:

With sturdy Northern resolution, Mr. Biggar in the last hour of the sitting of the House of Commons yesterday, assailed and defeated the Threshing Machines Bill. If your readers ask me why Mr. Biggar defeated the Threshing Machines Bill, I really must confess my inability to inform them. Perhaps it was that the Bill was proposed by Mr. Chaplin, and perhaps Mr. Biggar wished to punish Mr. Chaplin for his attack on Mr. Gladstone. It was a daring thing to do – I mean it was daring in one to get up with the knowledge that you must talk for a half an hour on Threshing Machines. But Mr. Biggar triumphed. Once or twice I really fancied all was over with the hon. member. He, to all appearance, had exhausted every possible branch of his subject, and Mr. Chaplin was already chuckling in anticipation of the break-down of his foe. But no! Mr. Biggar bethought him of "the old flail". It was a moment of inspiration. Who could not talk for fifteen minutes on " the old flail". A groan of mortal anguish escaped Mr. Chaplin as, in eloquently rounded periods, the honourable member for Cavan turned over, ogled, turned over again, and genially touched upon the beauties of flails. At length the hour struck. Mr. Biggar sank down victorious, and Mr. Chaplin rushed in anger from the House.

T. D. Sullivan refers to Biggar's preparation and delaying technique:

Of course he could not get the materials for his lengthy discourses "all out of his own head" but he knew whence there was a perfect mine of such matter, and thence he provided himself with supplies. He brought into the House from the Library bundles of parliamentary papers and Blue Books, and from these he proceeded to read copious extracts. Once when he had been at his work for more than two hours, without a pause – except to take an occasional sip of water – the chairman (the House being in Committee), thought to get him to resume his seat by telling him that his observations had become almost inaudible and unintelligible to the chair. Mr. Biggar tendered respectful apologies, said he felt conscious that his voice was growing somewhat indistinct, remarked that he was at rather too great a distance from the chair, but said he would be happy to improve matters by drawing nearer. Thereupon he gathered up his books and papers and moved up, with all the ease and confidence in the world, to the front bench on the opposition side, facing the table of the house – a place reserved by immemorial custom for ex-ministers and their leading supporters. Then, before resuming the thread, or rather the chain-cable- of his discourse, he informed the astonished functionary that if there was any part of his argument which had not reached his ears, he was quite willing to go over it again.

== Fenianism ==
Biggar sympathised with Fenianism but considered reliance on physical force Irish republicanism to be unrealistic. He joined the Irish Republican Brotherhood after his election to parliament in 1874 and accepted a seat on its Supreme Council, but 'only with a view to winning fenian support for parliamentary politics'. However, his involvement in constitutional politics did not sit well with his more radical IRB colleagues and he was expelled from its Supreme Council in 1876 according to Alvin Jackson. According to T. W. Moody he was expelled in March 1877 on the expiration of the August 1876 ultimatum of the I.R.B.'s supreme council to its members to cease involvement with the home rule movement.

In March 1879, in a meeting arranged by Michael Davitt, Biggar and fellow MP Charles Stewart Parnell met in Boulogne with John Devoy, the head of what was then the main Fenian organisation in America, Clan na Gael. Devoy described a "new departure" for the Fenians. They would abandon plans for armed revolt and support the drive for Irish home rule, provided the Home Rule League backed the campaign of tenant farmers against landlords.

== Land War ==
Biggar served as a nominal joint treasurer on the executive of the Irish National Land League from its formation on 21 October 1879, and was charged on 2 November 1880, together with the other Land League leaders, with conspiracy to prevent the payment of rent as violence broke out in the Land War.

As part of Parnell's attempt to widen the area of land reform agitation while remaining within constitutional bounds, Biggar on 26 March 1882 was elected to the executive committee of the new National Land League of Great Britain.

== Captain O'Shea ==
In early 1886 Parnell insisted on nominating Captain O'Shea, the separated husband of Katharine O'Shea with whom he lived in a family relationship, as the nationalist candidate for Galway – a move widely viewed as an attempt to buy O'Shea's silence. T.M. Healy, who initially opposed the nomination together with Biggar, describes Biggar's attitude to the issue:

Parnell's intrigue should not, Biggar said, be allowed to stand in the way of political obligations, and no seat should be sold to a worthless woman's husband. Biggar was not a purist, but urged that private vices should be kept private, and ought not to be imported into political issues. He was prepared to bring about the downfall of Parnell, in spite of the fact that Gladstone was in treaty with him for a Home Rule Bill. I differed.

On 9 February 1886 Parnell declared to the voters of Galway that "If my candidate is defeated, the news will spread round the universe that a disaster has overwhelmed Ireland. The world will say, 'Parnell is beaten. Ireland has no longer a leader.'" Biggar split with Parnell over this, declaring "Mr. Chairman, all I have to say is, I can't agree with what you state, and if Mr. Lynch [O'Shea's opponent] goes to the poll I'll support him!". Despite their differences, Biggar and Parnell retained their close alliance in subsequent years. Biggar died from heart disease in London – some months before the O'Shea scandal ended Parnell's career – and was buried in his native Belfast.

== Johnston and woman's suffrage ==
Following the defeat of a Women's Disability Bill in 1871, there was little debate in Parliament on votes for women until after Biggar's death in 1890. But Biggar did attend meetings in Belfast of Isabella Tod's North of Ireland Women's Suffrage Society. He did so alongside William Johnston, the unionist MP, nominee of the town's "Protestant Workingmen's Association", and a senior Orangeman, who, in the nineties, revived the legislative struggle for women's suffrage. When Johnston died in July 1902, The Irish News, commented on the courteous and friendly relationship between the two, otherwise fearsome, political opponents.

== Honours ==
The first GAA club in Ulster was founded in Ballyconnell in 1885 and named Ballyconnell Joe Biggars in his honour.

== Notes ==
- Clements, Paul (8 December 2007). "An Irishman's Diary". The Irish Times.
- Beiner, Guy (2012). "Revisiting F. J. Bigger: A "Fin-de-Siècle" Flourish of Antiquarian-Folklore Scholarship in Ulster". Béaloideas. 80. Folklore of Ireland Society: 142–162. JSTOR 24862874.

Attribution

This article incorporates text from a publication now in the public domain: Norgate, Gerald le Grys (1901). "Biggar, Joseph Gillis". In Lee, Sidney (ed.). Dictionary of National Biography (1st supplement). London: Smith, Elder & Co.

Parliament of the United Kingdom
Preceded by Edward James Saunderson	Member of Parliament for County Cavan; 1874–1885	Constituency abolished
New constituency	Member of Parliament for West Cavan; 1885–1890	Succeeded by Edmund Francis Vesey Knox
