= 1904 West Cavan by-election =

UK Parliamentary by-election

The 1904 West Cavan by-election was a parliamentary by-election held for the United Kingdom House of Commons constituency of West Cavan on 11 June 1904. The election was caused by the death of the sitting member, Thomas McGovern of the Irish Parliamentary Party. Only one candidate was nominated, Vincent Kennedy of the Irish Parliamentary Party, who was therefore elected unopposed.
