= Peter Paul Galligan =

Irish politician (1888–1966)

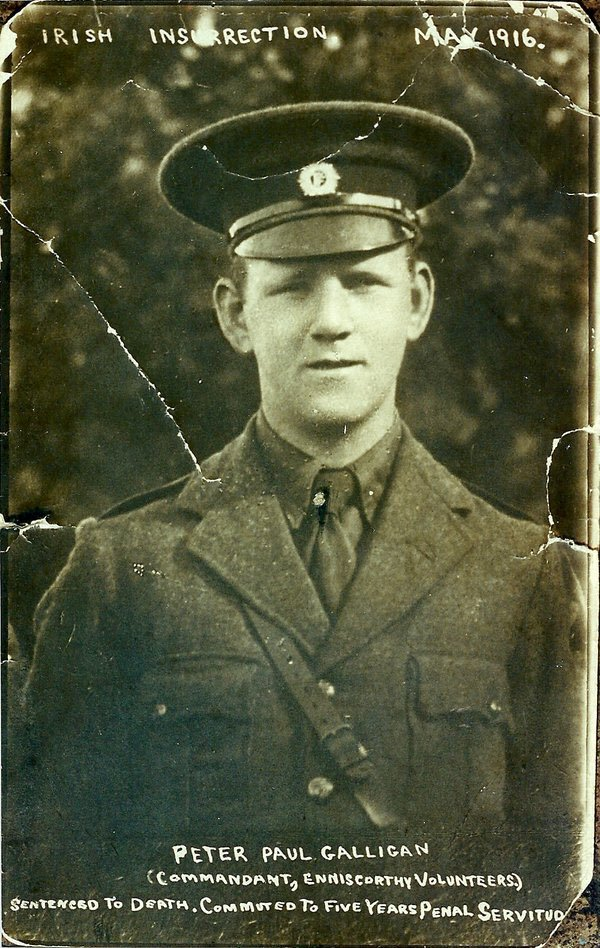
- Galligan in 1916

Teachta Dála
- In office May 1921 – June 1922
- Constituency: Cavan
- In office December 1918 – May 1921
- Constituency: Cavan West

Personal details
- Born: 20 June 1888 Carrigallen, County Leitrim, Ireland
- Died: 14 December 1966 (aged 78)
- Party: Sinn Féin
- Military service
- Allegiance: Irish Republic
- Service: Irish Volunteers; Irish Republican Army
- Service years: 1913–1922
- Rank: Commandant
- Commands: Commandant, Cavan Brigade, IRA; Vice-Commandant, Enniscorthy Battalion, Irish Volunteers
- Conflicts: Easter Rising; Irish War of Independence

Peter Paul Galligan (20 June 1888 – 14 December 1966) was an Irish Sinn Féin politician who would experience over five years in prison as a result of his republican activities during the 1916 Rising in Enniscorthy and the War of Independence in County Cavan.

Peter Paul Galligan was born in Carrigallen, County Leitrim and attended school at St Patrick's College, Cavan. A member of the Irish Republican Brotherhood and the Irish Volunteers, Galligan cycled from Dublin to Wexford during the Easter Rising. He was carrying James Connolly's battle orders to ensure that the volunteers in the area rose to support those in Dublin.

The Volunteers were ordered to destroy rail lines in order to prevent British reinforcements to Dublin from the south. Commandant Galligan and his men occupied Ferns, County Wexford and the surrounding areas. With 600 Volunteers in Enniscorthy under the command of Robert Brennan almost all of north Wexford was in rebel hands. When the volunteers disbanded he cycled back to County Cavan but was arrested at the family home. After his arrest Galligan was sentenced to death but that sentence was later reduced to five years penal servitude.

He was elected unopposed as the Sinn Féin MP for Cavan West at the 1918 general election. The following month, in January 1919, Sinn Féin MPs who had been elected in the Westminster elections of 1918 refused to recognise the Parliament of the United Kingdom and instead assembled in the Mansion House in Dublin as a revolutionary parliament called Dáil Éireann, though Galligan did not attend as he was in prison. He was arrested again in September 1920 and re-elected as a Sinn Féin Teachta Dála (TD) for the Cavan constituency at the 1921 elections. He supported the Anglo-Irish Treaty and voted in favour of it. He did not contest the 1922 general election and retired from politics.

== Sources ==
- Robert Brennan (1950), Allegiance.

Parliament of the United Kingdom
Preceded by Vincent Kennedy	Member of Parliament for Cavan West; 1918–1922	Constituency abolished
Oireachtas
New constituency	Teachta Dála for Cavan West; 1918–1921	Constituency abolished

Dáil	Election	Deputy (Party)	Deputy (Party)	Deputy (Party)	Deputy (Party)
2nd	1921	Arthur Griffith (SF)	Peter Paul Galligan (SF)	Seán Milroy (SF)	3 seats 1921–1923
3rd	1922	Arthur Griffith (PT-SF)	Walter L. Cole (PT-SF)	Seán Milroy (PT-SF)	3 seats 1921–1923
4th	1923	Patrick Smith (Rep)	John James Cole (Ind.)	Seán Milroy (CnaG)	Patrick Baxter (FP)
4th	1925 by-election	Patrick Smith (Rep)	John James Cole (Ind.)	John Joe O'Reilly (CnaG)	Patrick Baxter (FP)
5th	1927 (Jun)	Patrick Smith (FF)	John O'Hanlon (Ind.)	John Joe O'Reilly (CnaG)	Patrick Baxter (FP)
6th	1927 (Sep)	Patrick Smith (FF)	John O'Hanlon (Ind.)	John Joe O'Reilly (CnaG)	John James Cole (Ind.)
7th	1932	Patrick Smith (FF)	John O'Hanlon (Ind.)	John Joe O'Reilly (CnaG)	Michael Sheridan (FF)
8th	1933	Patrick Smith (FF)	Patrick McGovern (NCP)	John Joe O'Reilly (CnaG)	Michael Sheridan (FF)
9th	1937	Patrick Smith (FF)	Patrick McGovern (FG)	John James Cole (Ind.)	Michael Sheridan (FF)
10th	1938	Patrick Smith (FF)	Patrick McGovern (FG)	John James Cole (Ind.)	Michael Sheridan (FF)
11th	1943	Patrick Smith (FF)	Patrick O'Reilly (CnaT)	John James Cole (Ind.)	Michael Sheridan (FF)
12th	1944	Patrick Smith (FF)	Patrick O'Reilly (CnaT)	Tom O'Reilly (Ind.)	Michael Sheridan (FF)
13th	1948	Patrick Smith (FF)	John Tully (CnaP)	Patrick O'Reilly (Ind.)	Michael Sheridan (FF)
14th	1951	Patrick Smith (FF)	John Tully (CnaP)	Patrick O'Reilly (FG)	Michael Sheridan (FF)
15th	1954	Patrick Smith (FF)	John Tully (CnaP)	Patrick O'Reilly (FG)	Michael Sheridan (FF)
16th	1957	Patrick Smith (FF)	John Tully (CnaP)	Patrick O'Reilly (FG)	Michael Sheridan (FF)
17th	1961	Patrick Smith (FF)	Séamus Dolan (FF)	Patrick O'Reilly (FG)	3 seats 1961–1977
18th	1965	Patrick Smith (FF)	John Tully (CnaP)	Tom Fitzpatrick (FG)	3 seats 1961–1977
19th	1969	Patrick Smith (FF)	Patrick O'Reilly (FG)	Tom Fitzpatrick (FG)	3 seats 1961–1977
20th	1973	Patrick Smith (FF)	John Wilson (FF)	Tom Fitzpatrick (FG)	3 seats 1961–1977
21st	1977	Constituency abolished. See Cavan–Monaghan			
