= Donal Sullivan =

Irish politician

Donal Sullivan (1838 – 3 March 1907), was an Irish nationalist politician and Member of Parliament (MP) in the House of Commons of the United Kingdom of Great Britain and Ireland from 1885 to 1907. He was the younger brother of Alexander Martin Sullivan and of Timothy Daniel Sullivan, who were both prominent members of parliament. Like the Healy brothers Tim Healy and Maurice, the Sullivans were from Bantry, Co. Cork.

Donal Sullivan was first elected as an Irish Parliamentary Party MP for the new constituency of South Westmeath at the 1885 general election. His brother T. D. Sullivan was sitting as one of the two Westmeath MPs until that election, when he moved to Dublin College Green, and Donal had no difficulty in defeating a Loyalist candidate who won only 200 votes. Donal held the seat unopposed in 1886. When the Irish Party split over Parnell's leadership in 1890, Donal and T. D. both joined the Anti-Parnellites, and at the general election of 1892 Donal was opposed by a Parnellite candidate who took almost one third of the vote. Thereafter, Donal was returned unopposed until his death in 1907.

His nephew Serjeant Sullivan described him in 1927 as 'still well remembered at Westminster as the man who never made a speech and never missed a division during his long years of membership'. This does not seem to be quite true; for instance, Hansard records a speech on 14 September 1886 but most of his contributions appear to have been questions.

== Notes ==
Parliament of the United Kingdom
New constituency	Member of Parliament for South Westmeath; 1885 – 1907	Succeeded by Sir Walter Nugent, Bt
