= Walter Nugent =

Irish politician (1865–1955)

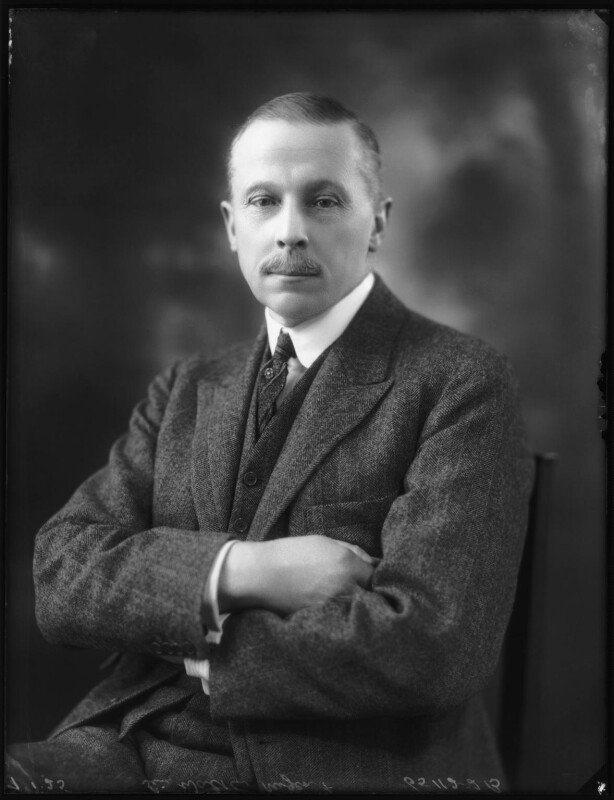
- Nugent in 1925

Senator
- In office 12 December 1928 – 9 December 1931

Member of Parliament
- In office April 1907 – December 1918
- Constituency: South Westmeath

Personal details
- Born: 12 December 1865 Blackrock, Dublin, Ireland
- Died: 12 November 1955 (aged 89) County Westmeath, Ireland
- Party: Irish Parliamentary Party; Independent
- Spouse: Aileen More O'Malley (m. 1916)
- Children: 3
- Education: Catholic University

Sir Walter Richard Nugent, 4th Baronet (12 December 1865 – 12 November 1955) was an Irish baronet, politician and member of parliament (MP) in the House of Commons from 1907 to 1918.

Nugent was elected unopposed to the House of Commons as an Irish Parliamentary Party MP for South Westmeath at a by-election in 1907, and held the seat through the January and December 1910 elections, until 1918. At the 1918 general election, he ran as an independent nationalist candidate in the County Westmeath constituency but was defeated by Sinn Féin's Laurence Ginnell.

In 1896, he had succeeded to the baronetcy of Donore in Multyfarnham, County Westmeath. He was a member of Seanad Éireann of the Irish Free State from 1928 to 1931.

He was the last High Sheriff of Westmeath in 1922.

Parliament of the United Kingdom
Preceded by Donal Sullivan	Member of Parliament for South Westmeath; 1907–1918	Constituency abolished
Baronetage of the United Kingdom
Preceded by Percy Nugent	Baronet (of Donore); 1896–1955	Succeeded by Peter Nugent
