= Irish National Federation =

Anti-Parnellite split in the Irish Parliamentary Party, 1891–1900

- Leader: Justin McCarthy; John Dillon
- Founded: 1891
- Dissolved: 1900
- Split from: Irish National League
- Merged into: United Irish League
- Ideology: Irish nationalism Religious conservatism Anti-Parnellite; Classical liberalism
- Political position: Centre-right
- Colours: Green

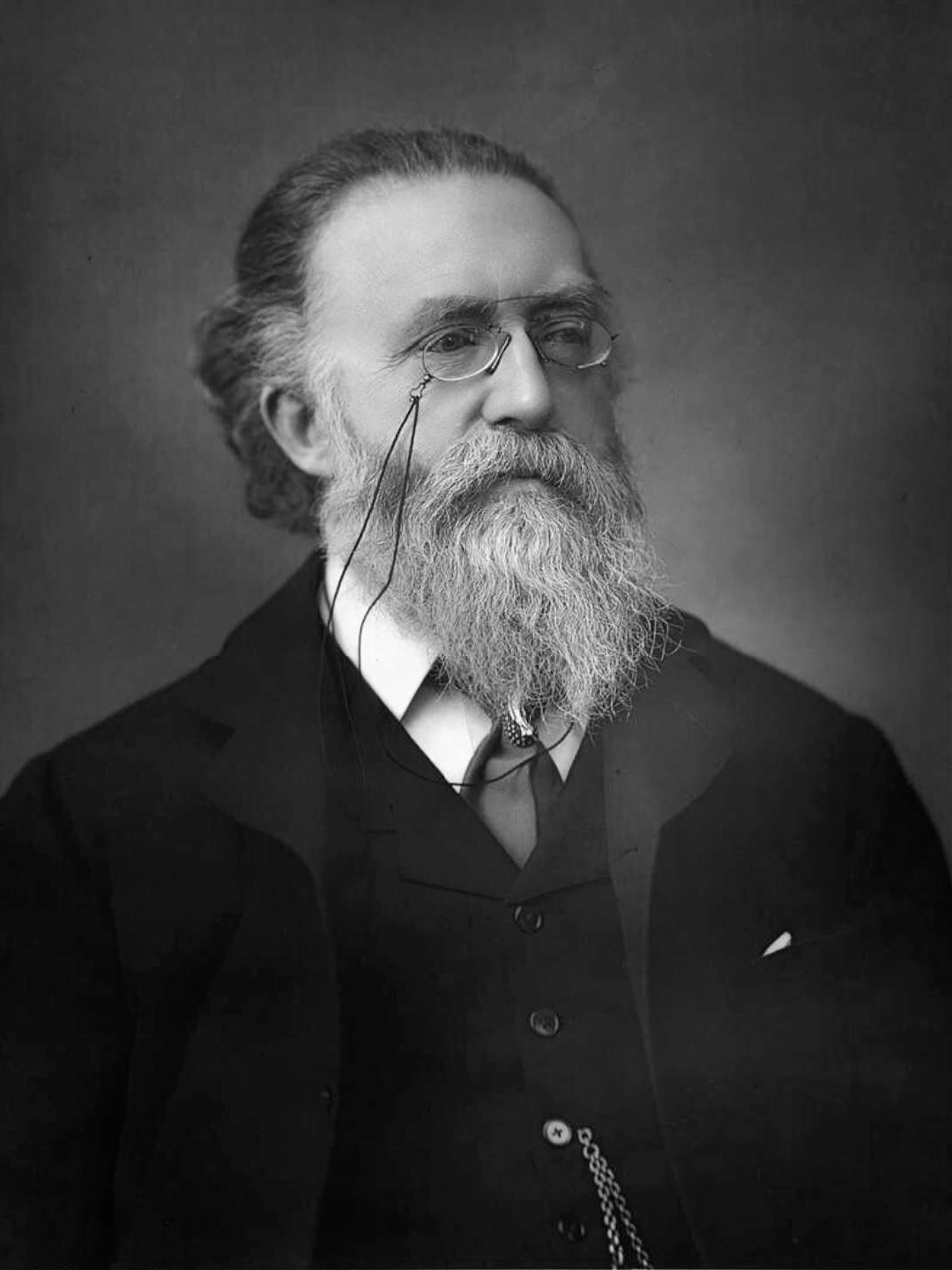
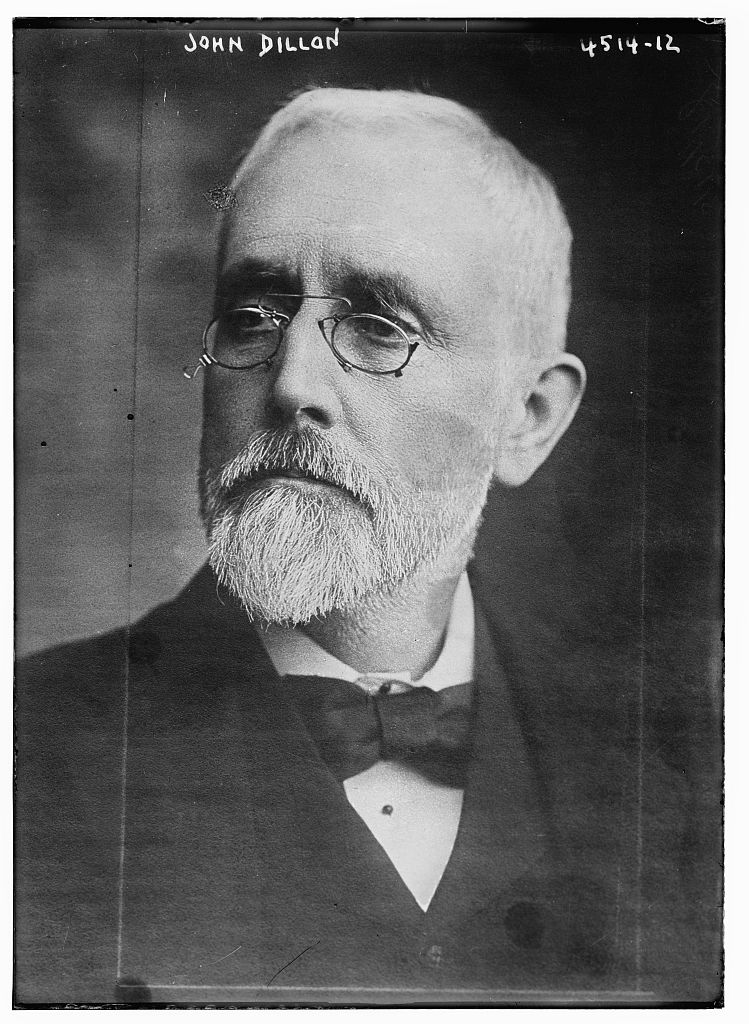
Justin McCarthy and then John Dillon served as the successive leaders of the party

The Irish National Federation (INF) was a nationalist political party in Ireland. It was founded in 1891 by former members of the Irish National League (INL), after a split in the Irish Parliamentary Party (IPP) on the leadership of Charles Stewart Parnell. Parnell had refused to resign his leadership of the party after being named in divorce proceedings against Katharine O'Shea by the former MP William O'Shea. In the aftermath of the divorce, William Ewart Gladstone, leader of the Liberal Party, had declared that he would not work with Parnell, damaging the parliamentary alliance between the IPP and the Liberals.

The group, which became known as the Anti-Parnellites, had a larger membership than the rump of the INL that stood by Parnell. It was led first by Justin McCarthy, then by John Dillon. The INF was supported by the Catholic clergy, who strongly influenced the general elections of 1892 and 1895, and the by-elections of the period. The Irish Times reported on 23 February 1893 that "the priests … swarmed at all the polling stations, and kept the voters constantly in view".

Membership of the INF declined after the United Irish League (UIL) was founded in 1898 by William O'Brien to promote unity between factions of Irish political nationalism. As a result, in 1900 the Federation joined the UIL in merging with the INL under the leadership of John Redmond, who had led the Irish National League after Parnell's death, in a newly reformed Irish Parliamentary Party.
