= List of MPs elected in the December 1910 United Kingdom general election in Ireland =

This is a list of the 103 MPs who were elected for Irish seats at the 1910 United Kingdom general election (December).

== Election result (Ireland only) ==
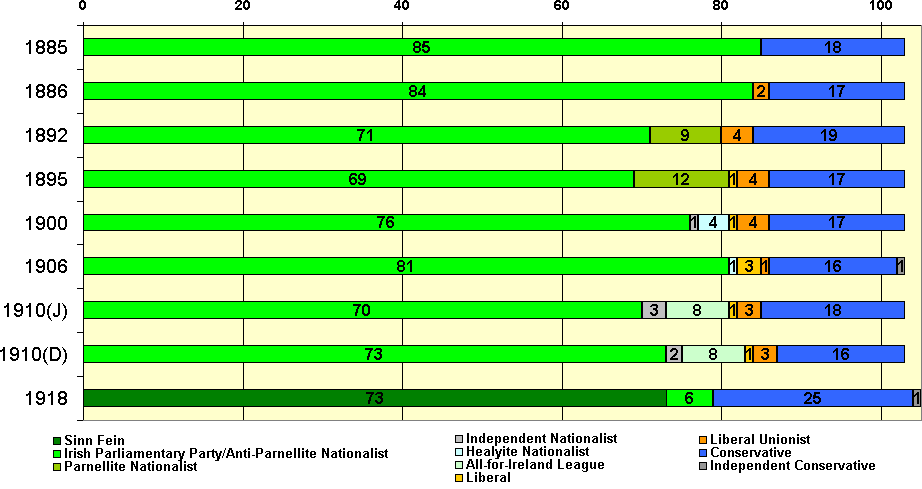
Graph of Irish UK MPs 1885–1918 in numbers

Party	Seats
Irish Parliamentary	73
Irish Unionist	18
All-for-Ireland	8
Independent Nationalist	2
Liberal Unionist	1
Liberal	1

== Members by constituency ==
Irish members of the House of Commons
Constituency	Name	Party
Antrim East	James McCalmont	Irish Unionist
Antrim Mid	Arthur O'Neill	Irish Unionist
Antrim North	Peter Kerr-Smiley	Irish Unionist
Antrim South	Charles Craig	Irish Unionist
Armagh Mid	John Lonsdale	Irish Unionist
Armagh North	William Moore	Irish Unionist
Armagh South	Charles O'Neill	Irish Parliamentary
Belfast East	R. J. McMordie	Irish Unionist
Belfast North	Robert Thompson	Irish Unionist
Belfast South	James Chambers	Irish Unionist
Belfast West	Joseph Devlin	Irish Parliamentary
County Carlow	Michael Molloy	Irish Parliamentary
Cavan East	Samuel Young	Irish Parliamentary
Cavan West	Vincent Kennedy	Irish Parliamentary
Clare East	Willie Redmond	Irish Parliamentary
Clare West	Arthur Lynch	Irish Parliamentary
Cork City	Maurice Healy	All-for-Ireland
Cork City	William O'Brien	All-for-Ireland
Cork East	Anthony Donelan	Irish Parliamentary
Cork Mid	D. D. Sheehan	All-for-Ireland
Cork North	Patrick Guiney	All-for-Ireland
Cork North East	Moreton Frewen	All-for-Ireland
Cork South	John Walsh	All-for-Ireland
Cork South East	Eugene Crean	All-for-Ireland
Cork West	James Gilhooly	All-for-Ireland
Donegal East	Edward Kelly	Irish Parliamentary
Donegal North	Philip O'Doherty	Irish Parliamentary
Donegal South	J. G. Swift MacNeill	Irish Parliamentary
Donegal West	Hugh Law	Irish Parliamentary
Down East	James Craig	Irish Unionist
Down North	William Mitchell-Thomson	Irish Unionist
Down South	Jeremiah McVeagh	Irish Parliamentary
Down West	William MacCaw	Irish Unionist
Dublin College Green	Joseph Nannetti	Irish Parliamentary
Dublin County North	J. J. Clancy	Irish Parliamentary
Dublin County South	William Francis Cotton	Irish Parliamentary
Dublin Harbour	William Abraham	Irish Parliamentary
Dublin St Patrick's	William Field	Irish Parliamentary
Dublin St Stephen's Green	P. J. Brady	Irish Parliamentary
Dublin University	James Campbell	Irish Unionist
Dublin University	Edward Carson	Irish Unionist
Fermanagh North	Godfrey Fetherstonhaugh	Irish Unionist
Fermanagh South	Patrick Crumley	Irish Parliamentary
Galway Borough	Stephen Gwynn	Irish Parliamentary
Galway Connemara	William O'Malley	Irish Parliamentary
Galway East	John Roche	Irish Parliamentary
Galway North	Richard Hazleton	Irish Parliamentary
Galway South	William Duffy	Irish Parliamentary
Kerry East	Timothy O'Sullivan	Irish Parliamentary
Kerry North	Michael Joseph Flavin	Irish Parliamentary
Kerry South	John Boland	Irish Parliamentary
Kerry West	Thomas O'Donnell	Irish Parliamentary
Kildare North	John O'Connor	Irish Parliamentary
Kildare South	Denis Kilbride	Irish Parliamentary
Kilkenny City	Pat O'Brien	Irish Parliamentary
Kilkenny North	Michael Meagher	Irish Parliamentary
Kilkenny South	Matthew Keating	Irish Parliamentary
Birr	Michael Reddy	Irish Parliamentary
Tullamore	Edmund Haviland-Burke	Irish Parliamentary
Leitrim North	Francis Meehan	Irish Parliamentary
Leitrim South	Thomas Smyth	Irish Parliamentary
Limerick City	Michael Joyce	Irish Parliamentary
Limerick East	Thomas Lundon	Irish Parliamentary
Limerick West	Patrick O'Shaughnessy	Irish Parliamentary
Londonderry City	James Hamilton	Irish Unionist
Londonderry North	Hugh T. Barrie	Irish Unionist
Londonderry South	John Gordon	Liberal Unionist
Longford North	J. P. Farrell	Irish Parliamentary
Longford South	John Phillips	Irish Parliamentary
Louth North	Richard Hazleton	Irish Parliamentary
Louth South	Joseph Nolan	Irish Parliamentary
Mayo East	John Dillon	Irish Parliamentary
Mayo North	Daniel Boyle	Irish Parliamentary
Mayo South	John Fitzgibbon	Irish Parliamentary
Mayo West	William Doris	Irish Parliamentary
Meath North	Patrick White	Irish Parliamentary
Meath South	David Sheehy	Irish Parliamentary
Monaghan North	James Lardner	Irish Parliamentary
Monaghan South	John McKean	Ind. Nationalist
Newry	John Mooney	Irish Parliamentary
Queen's County Leix	Patrick Meehan	Irish Parliamentary
Queen's County Ossory	William Delany	Irish Parliamentary
Roscommon North	James O'Kelly	Irish Parliamentary
Roscommon South	John Patrick Hayden	Irish Parliamentary
Sligo North	Thomas Scanlan	Irish Parliamentary
Sligo South	John O'Dowd	Irish Parliamentary
Tipperary East	Thomas Condon	Irish Parliamentary
Tipperary Mid	John Hackett	Irish Parliamentary
Tipperary North	John Esmonde	Irish Parliamentary
Tipperary South	John Cullinan	Irish Parliamentary
Tyrone East	William Redmond	Irish Parliamentary
Tyrone Mid	Richard McGhee	Irish Parliamentary
Tyrone North	Redmond Barry	Liberal
Tyrone South	Andrew Horner	Irish Unionist
Waterford City	John Redmond	Irish Parliamentary
Waterford East	Patrick Power	Irish Parliamentary
Waterford West	J. J. O'Shee	Irish Parliamentary
Westmeath North	Laurence Ginnell	Ind. Nationalist
Westmeath South	Sir Walter Nugent	Irish Parliamentary
Wexford North	Sir Thomas Esmonde	Irish Parliamentary
Wexford South	Peter Ffrench	Irish Parliamentary
Wicklow East	John Muldoon	Irish Parliamentary
Wicklow West	Edward Peter O'Kelly	Irish Parliamentary

== Membership changes ==
Below is a list of seats which changed parties in by-elections held between this general election and the next.

Winner	Party	Constituency	Date	Parliament	Outgoing	Party	Reason for vacancy
Augustine Roche	IPP	North Louth	15 March 1911		Richard Hazleton	IPP	Void election
Anthony Donelan	IPP	East Wicklow	13 July 1911		John Muldoon	IPP	Resignation ^{‡}
Timothy Healy	AFI	North East Cork	15 July 1911		Moreton Frewen	AFI	Resignation ^{‡‡}
John Muldoon	IPP	East Cork	15 July 1911		Anthony Donelan	IPP	Void election
Thomas Russell	Lib	North Tyrone	6 October 1911		Redmond Barry	Lib	Appointed; Lord Chancellor
David Hogg	Lib	Londonderry City	30 January 1913		James Hamilton	U	Hamilton succeeded as Duke of Abercorn ^{‡‡}
Martin Murphy	IPP	East Waterford	15 February 1913		Patrick Power	IPP	†
Robert McCalmont	U	East Antrim	19 February 1913		James McCalmont	U	†
Patrick Meehan	IPP	Queen's County Leix	9 June 1913		Patrick Meehan	IPP	†
John Guiney	AFI	North Cork	4 November 1913		Patrick Guiney	AFI	†
William O'Brien	AFI	Cork City	18 February 1914		William O'Brien	AFI	Resigned to re-contest ^{‡}
Robert Sharman-Crawford	U	Belfast East	6 April 1914		R. J. McMordie	U	†
Richard Hazleton	IPP	North Galway	21 July 1914		Richard Hazleton	IPP	Resigned to re-contest ^{‡}
John Donovan	IPP	West Wicklow	20 August 1914		Edward O'Kelly	IPP	†
Sir James Dougherty	Lib	Londonderry City	30 November 1914		David Hogg	Lib	†
James Cosgrave	IPP	East Galway	4 December 1914		John Roche	IPP	†
Edward Graham	IPP	Tullamore	8 December 1914		Edmund Haviland-Burke	IPP	†
Hugh O'Neill	U	Mid Antrim	19 February 1915		Arthur O'Neill	U	†
John Nugent	IPP	Dublin College Green	11 June 1915		Joseph Nannetti	IPP	†
John Esmonde	IPP	North Tipperary	17 June 1915		John Esmonde	IPP	†
Alfie Byrne	IPP	Dublin Harbour	1 October 1915		William Abraham	IPP	†
Patrick Whitty	IPP	North Louth	24 February 1916		Augustine Roche	IPP	†
William Coote	U	South Tyrone	28 February 1916		Andrew Horner	U	†
James Campbell	U	Dublin University	25 April 1916		James Campbell	U	Appointed; Attorney-General
John Fitzpatrick	IPP	Queen's County Ossory	28 April 1916		William Delany	IPP	†
Denis Henry	U	South Londonderry	22 May 1916		John Gordon	U	Resignation
Edward Archdale	U	North Fermanagh	27 October 1916		Godfrey Fetherstonhaugh	U	Resignation ^{‡‡}
Daniel O'Leary	IPP	West Cork	15 November 1916		James Gilhooly	AFI	†
George Noble Plunkett	SF	North Roscommon	3 February 1917		James O'Kelly	IPP	†
Arthur Samuels	U	Dublin University	5 February 1917		James Campbell	U	Appointed; Lord Chief Justice
William Lindsay	U	South Belfast	9 April 1917		James Chambers	U	Appointed; Solicitor-General
Joseph McGuinness	SF	South Longford	10 May 1917		John Phillips	IPP	†
Michael Hearn	IPP	South Dublin	6 July 1917		William Cotton	IPP	†
Éamon de Valera	SF	East Clare	10 July 1917		Willie Redmond	IPP	†
W. T. Cosgrave	SF	Kilkenny City	10 August 1917		Pat O'Brien	IPP	†
Arthur Samuels	U	Dublin University	5 October 1917		Arthur Samuels	U	Appointed; Solicitor-General
Sir William Allen	U	North Armagh	5 October 1917		Sir William Moore	U	Appointed; Judge of the High Court of Ireland
James Lonsdale	U	Mid Armagh	23 January 1918		Sir John Lonsdale	U	Resignation ^{‡}
Patrick Donnelly	IPP	South Armagh	2 February 1918		Charles O'Neill	IPP	†
William Redmond	IPP	Waterford City	22 March 1918		John Redmond	IPP	†
Thomas Harbison	IPP	East Tyrone	3 April 1918		William Redmond	IPP	Resignation ^{‡}
Patrick McCartan	SF	Tullamore	19 April 1918		Edward John Graham	IPP	†
Arthur Griffith	SF	East Cavan	20 June 1918		Samuel Young	IPP	†

^{†}Denotes members who Died in Office.

^{‡}Denotes members who was appointed to the office of the Crown Steward and Bailiff of the three Chiltern Hundreds of Stoke, Desborough and Burnham.

^{‡‡}Denotes members who was appointed to the office of the Crown Steward and Bailiff of the Manor of Northstead.
