= 1916 West Cork by-election =

UK Parliamentary by-election

A by-election in the constituency of West Cork was held on 15 November 1916, following the death of the incumbent All-for-Ireland League MP, James Gilhooly. It was won by Daniel O'Leary, who sat with the Irish Parliamentary Party candidate.

During World War I the major political parties observed an electoral truce and most elections were uncontested with the incumbent party nominating a successor who was returned unopposed. Unusually, when Gilhooly died, the seat was contested by three candidates none of whom had official recognition from the Irish nationalist political organisations but all of whom supported the broad nationalist agenda. The by-election was the third to be held in Ireland after the Easter Rising and the last in which the Irish Parliamentary Party captured a seat, the effective self-inflicted demise of the All-for-Ireland League and, in general, a pivotal point in the transition from one era to another. It was also the last contest between the political rivals William O'Brien's All-for-Ireland League and John Redmond's Irish Parliamentary Party.

== Candidates ==
Daniel O'Leary had pledged to join the Irish Parliamentary Party and was a supporter of John Redmond. However, the United Irish League, the official Nationalist organisation, had withheld approval of his candidacy.

Frank Healy was imprisoned in Frongoch internment camp for supposedly being associated with Sinn Féin, but Sinn Féin repudiated his candidacy for not revoking to take his seat at Westminster, instead he had been supported by William O'Brien, who was leader of the All-for-Ireland League.

Michael Shipsey was a local member of the All-for-Ireland League who stood in protest against William O'Brien's adoption of an unofficial candidate.

The 1916 by-election, which contrasted so obviously with Gilhooly's long tenure of the seat was viewed as a farce by Unionist opinion.

== Result ==
West Cork by-election, 1916
Party	Candidate	Votes	%	±%
Irish Parliamentary	Daniel O'Leary	1,866	46.8	–0.1
All-for-Ireland	Frank J. Healy	1,750	43.9	–9.2
Independent All-for-Ireland League	Michael B. Shipsey	370	9.3	N/A
Majority		116	2.9	N/A
Turnout		3,986	71.4	–1.5
Irish Parliamentary gain from All-for-Ireland		Swing	+4.6	
