= Mayo South =

Mayo South or South Mayo may refer to one of two parliamentary constituencies in County Mayo, Ireland:

- Mayo South (Dáil constituency) (1923–1969)
- South Mayo (UK Parliament constituency) (1885–1922)

See also

- County Mayo
