= 1900 South Mayo by-election =

UK Parliamentary by-election

The 1900 South Mayo by-election was a parliamentary by-election held for the United Kingdom House of Commons constituency of South Mayo on 27 February 1900. The vacancy arose because of the resignation of the sitting member Michael Davitt, of the Irish Parliamentary Party.

The by-election was won by John O'Donnell of the Irish Parliamentary Party.

== Result ==
1900 South Mayo by-election
Party	Candidate	Votes	%	±%
Irish Parliamentary	John O'Donnell	2,401	84.9	N/A
Ind. Nationalist	John MacBride	427	15.1	New
Majority		1,974	69.8	N/A
Turnout		2,828	31.2	N/A
Registered electors		9,055		
Irish Parliamentary hold		Swing	N/A	
