= South Cork (UK Parliament constituency) =

UK parliamentary constituency in Ireland, 1885–1922

- Former county constituency for the House of Commons

1885–1922
- Seats: 1
- Created from: County Cork
- Replaced by: Cork Mid, North, South, South East and West

South Cork, formally the Southern division of County Cork, was a parliamentary constituency in Ireland, represented in the Parliament of the United Kingdom. From 1885 to 1922 it returned one Member of Parliament (MP) to the House of Commons of the United Kingdom of Great Britain and Ireland.

Until the 1885 general election the area was part of the County Cork constituency. From 1922, on the establishment of the Irish Free State, it was not represented in the UK Parliament.

== Boundaries ==
This constituency comprised the southern part of County Cork, consisting of the barony of East Carbery, West Division, that part of the barony of Ibane and Barryroe not contained within the constituency of South East Cork, that part of the barony of West Carbery, East Division not contained within the constituency of West Cork, and that part of the barony of East Carbery, East Division contained within the parishes of Ballymoney, Desert, Desertserges, Island, Kilgarriff, Kilnagross and Templebryan.

== Members of Parliament ==
Election	Member	Party
1885	J. E. Kenny	Irish Parliamentary Party
1890	J. E. Kenny	Parnellite
1892	Edward Barry	Irish National Federation
1900	Edward Barry	Irish Parliamentary Party
1910 (Dec)	John P. Walsh	All-for-Ireland League
1918	Michael Collins	Sinn Féin
1922	constituency abolished	

== Elections ==
=== Elections in the 1880s ===
1885 general election: South Cork
Party	Candidate	Votes	%	±%
Irish Parliamentary	J. E. Kenny	4,823	96.1	
Irish Conservative	Francis McCarthy Connor	195	3.9	
Majority		4,628	92.2	
Turnout		5,018	68.7	
Registered electors		7,299		
Irish Parliamentary win (new seat)				

1886 general election: South Cork
Party	Candidate	Votes	%	±%
Irish Parliamentary	J. E. Kenny	Unopposed		
Irish Parliamentary hold				

=== Elections in the 1890s ===
1892 general election: South Cork
Party	Candidate	Votes	%	±%
Irish National Federation	Edward Barry	Unopposed		
Irish National Federation gain from Irish Parliamentary				

1895 general election: South Cork
Party	Candidate	Votes	%	±%
Irish National Federation	Edward Barry	Unopposed		
Irish National Federation hold				

=== Elections in the 1900s ===
1900 general election: South Cork
Party	Candidate	Votes	%	±%
Irish Parliamentary	Edward Barry	Unopposed		
Irish Parliamentary hold				

1906 general election: South Cork
Party	Candidate	Votes	%	±%
Irish Parliamentary	Edward Barry	Unopposed		
Irish Parliamentary hold				

=== Elections in the 1910s ===
January 1910 general election: South Cork
Party	Candidate	Votes	%	±%
Irish Parliamentary	Edward Barry	Unopposed		
Irish Parliamentary hold				

December 1910 general election: South Cork
Party	Candidate	Votes	%	±%
All-for-Ireland	John Walsh	2,346	51.8	N/A
Irish Parliamentary	Edward Barry	2,183	48.2	N/A
Majority		163	3.6	N/A
Turnout		4,529	73.1	N/A
Registered electors		6,199		
All-for-Ireland gain from Irish Parliamentary		Swing	N/A	

General election, 1918: South Cork
Party	Candidate	Votes	%	±%
Sinn Féin	Michael Collins	Unopposed		
Sinn Féin gain from All-for-Ireland				
