= Daniel O'Leary (Irish nationalist politician) =

Irish nationalist politician (1875–1954)

Daniel O'Leary (1875 – 23 December 1954) was an Irish nationalist politician and Member of Parliament (MP) in the House of Commons of the United Kingdom of Great Britain and Ireland.

He ran for election unsuccessfully as the Irish Parliamentary Party candidate for the West Cork constituency at the January 1910 and December 1910 general elections. O'Leary was elected at November 1916 West Cork by-election, following the death of the incumbent All-for-Ireland League MP, James Gilhooly. He did not contest the 1918 general election.

Parliament of the United Kingdom
Preceded by James Gilhooly	Member of Parliament for West Cork; 1916 – 1918	Succeeded by Seán Hayes
