= John O'Donnell (Irish politician, born 1866) =

Irish politician

John O’Donnell (1866–1920) was an Irish journalist, Nationalist politician and Member of Parliament (MP) in the United Kingdom House of Commons from 1900 to 1910.

He first became active in politics as an organiser for the United Irish League (UIL) in County Mayo during 1898–89 as a protégé of William O'Brien .

When the Irish Parliamentary Party (IPP) MP Michael Davitt resigned his seat in protest against the Second Boer War, O′Donnell was elected as MP for South Mayo in a by-election held 27 February 1900. He was re-elected in the October 1900 general election, and represented a newer generation of nationalist politicians. He became national secretary of the UIL, and remained loyal to William O’Brien even after O’Brien's resignation from the IPP in 1903, trying to orchestrate his return to the party. He was rewarded for this by the deputy leader of the IPP, John Dillon arranging at the next UIL convention in 1904, O’Donnell's replacement by his closest ally Joseph Devlin MP of Belfast, a first IPP move in gaining control of O’Brien's UIL.

O’Donnell bought the machinery of O’Briens closed down newspaper, the Irish People, moved to Galway and there set up the Connaught Champion. When land agitation flared up in 1905 he was imprisoned for his part in it to two months hard labour. He was re-elected in the January 1906 general election despite attempts by south Mayo priests to oppose him, squashed by O'Brien's threat to abandon a pact with the party to avoid contests at the election. After the election O’Donnell was identified as one of the little knot of O’Brien's die-hard supporters, both he and D. D. Sheehan being expelled that autumn from the IPP. In 1908 O’Donnell formally rejoined the party on the initiative of its leader John Redmond, in the interest of unity.

In the January 1910 general elections O’Donnell was returned for O’Brien's newly founded All-for-Ireland League, this time through clerical support against an anti-clerical opponent. However, in the subsequent December 1910 general elections he was forced to retire through lack of support, while an Irish Party boycott drove his newspaper out of business in 1911.

He retained links with O’Brien but never made a political comeback.

Parliament of the United Kingdom
Preceded by Michael Davitt	Member of Parliament for South Mayo; February 1900 – December 1910	Succeeded by John Fitzgibbon
