= John Fitzgibbon (politician) =

John Fitzgibbon (1845–1919) was an Irish politician. Fitzgibbon started his working life in his father's drapery business in Castlerea Seen as a spokesman for the tenant, Fitzgibbon exercised his powers of persuasion and oratory at meetings across Roscommon. His political life spanned 30 years, from the land war to the ranch war. He was also involved in the Gaelic League, the temperance movement and the Department of Agriculture and Technical Instruction for Ireland. At the December 1910 election, he became MP for South Mayo. He served on the Castlerea board of guardians and was a member (later chairman, 1901), of Roscommon County Council.

Michael Wheatley wrote of Fitzgibbon: 'He himself sold land to the Congested Districts Board for Ireland (CDB), oblivious to what a later age would call 'conflict of interest'. Wheatley was referring to the fact that Fitzgibbon was a member of the CDB in Castlerea when the transaction took place.

Parliament of the United Kingdom
Preceded by John O'Donnell	Member of Parliament for South Mayo; 1910 – 1918	Succeeded by William Sears
