= J. E. Kenny =

Irish doctor and politician

Joseph Edward Kenny
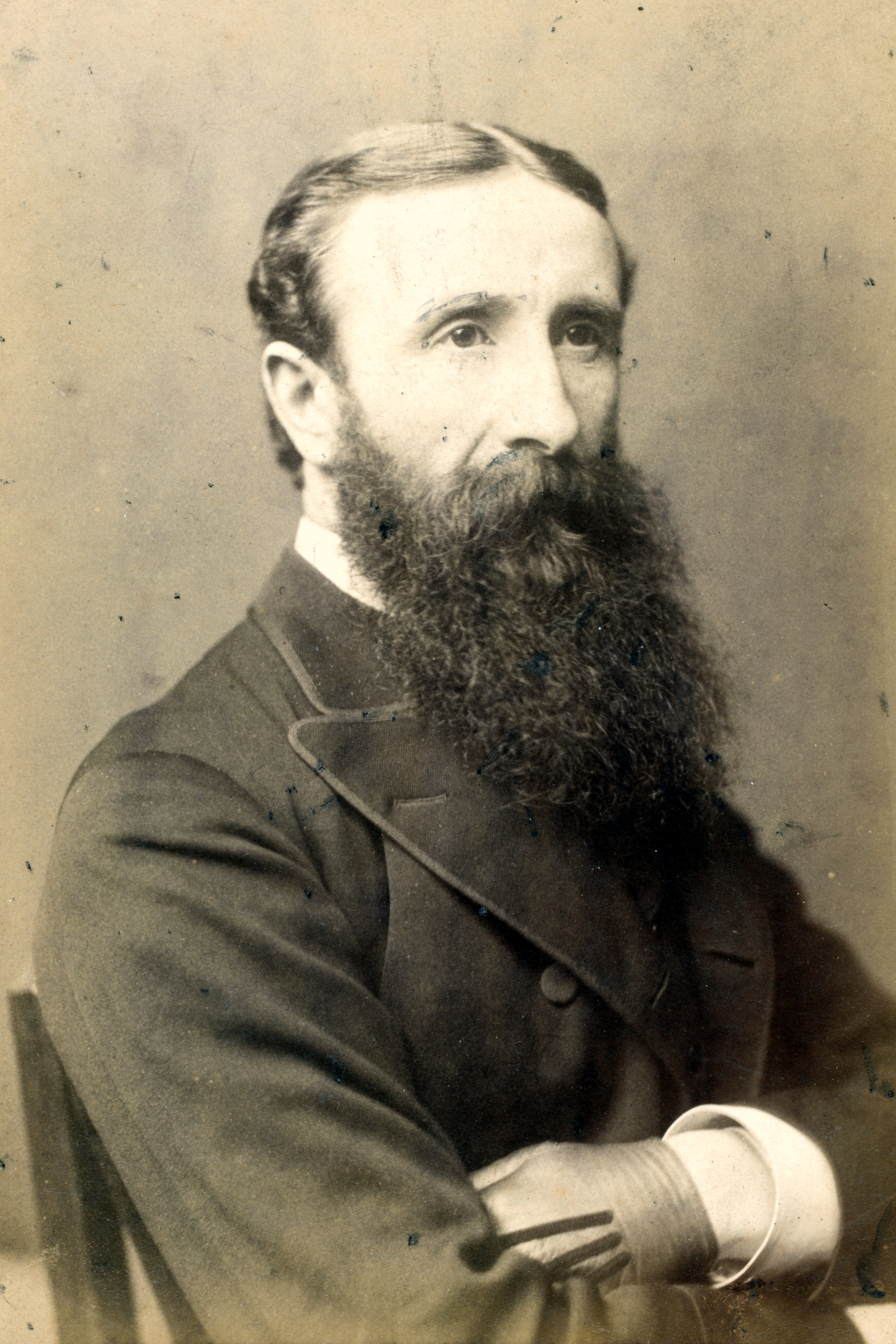
- Kenny, c. 1890

Member of Parliament for South Cork
- In office 27 November 1885 – 13 April 1890
- Preceded by: New constituency..
- Succeeded by: Edward Barry

Member of Parliament for Dublin College Green
- In office 1892–1896
- Preceded by: Timothy Daniel Sullivan
- Succeeded by: James Laurence Carew

Personal details
- Born: 1845 Dublin, Ireland
- Died: 9 April 1900 (aged 54–55)
- Party: Irish Parliamentary Party (until 1892); Irish National League

Joseph Edward Kenny (1845 – 9 April 1900) was an Irish physician, Coroner of the City of Dublin, nationalist politician and Member of Parliament (MP). In the House of Commons of the United Kingdom of Great Britain and Ireland, he was an Irish Parliamentary Party MP for South Cork from 1885 to 1892, and then a Parnellite MP for Dublin College Green from 1892 until his resignation in 1896.

Dr Joseph Kenny around 1895

Son of J. Kenny, manager of a lead mine at Palmerstown, County Dublin, he was educated at the Catholic University of Ireland in Dublin and at the University of Edinburgh, where he obtained his doctorate in medicine (M.D.) in 1870. After returning to Dublin, he became a medical officer to the North Dublin Union and in this role treated smallpox victims in the "sheds" at Glasnevin in the north Dublin epidemic of 1872. He caught the disease himself in spite of having been vaccinated.

An active Irish Nationalist, in 1881 he was arrested under the Coercion Act and confined in Kilmainham Jail. Here his status as a qualified physician was of considerable value to his fellow Nationalist prisoners, including Charles Stewart Parnell, because he was able to insist that the prison authorities provide proper medical care. As a result of this prison term he was dismissed from his post as a medical officer to the North Dublin Union by Chief Secretary W. E. Forster. The Prime Minister Gladstone ordered his reinstatement to this post after his case was raised by Irish members in the House of Commons. Kenny was one of the Treasurers of the Land League and later of the Irish National League. He later became physician to the Catholic national seminary at Maynooth.

At the 1885 general election, Kenny won South Cork by a huge majority over the Irish Conservative Party candidate. He was then returned unopposed in 1886. When the Irish Party split over Parnell's leadership in 1890, Kenny supported Parnell. As a result of the hostility of the Catholic Church to Parnell, Kenny was dismissed from his position as Medical Officer at Maynooth College on 23 October 1891, on straightforwardly political grounds. He was one of only nine Parnellites elected to Parliament in 1892, although he easily won Dublin College Green, securing just over 50 per cent of the vote in a three-cornered fight, and defeating the sitting anti-Parnellite T. D. Sullivan. He was then returned unopposed for the same seat in 1895. In July 1891 he was elected as Coroner for the City of Dublin (prior to the Local Government (Ireland) Act 1898, coroners in Ireland were elected). Kenny resigned his parliamentary seat in 1896 on the ground that he could no longer attend the House of Commons regularly.

He died in office as Coroner at the relatively young age of about 55, of blood poisoning after a tooth extraction.

One month after Kenny's death, an auction of his effects was carried out, which included a rare collection of books, pamphlets and plaster casts of the faces of Wolfe Tone, Robert Emmet, John Sheares, "and other famous Irishmen." Kenny had bought the cast of Emmet's face at the auction of Dr. R. R. Madden's possessions for £52 10s.

== Selected writings ==
- Report of the Medical Commission of the Mansion House Committee, by George Sigerson and Joseph E. Kenny, Dublin, Mansion House, 1880

== Sources ==
- Freeman's Journal, 10 April 1900
- Margaret Leamy, Parnell’s Faithful Few, New York, Macmillan, 1936
- F. S. L. Lyons, Charles Stewart Parnell, London, Collins, 1977, pp. 183–6
- The Times (London), 1 December 1885, 5 July 1892, 31 March 1896
- Brian M. Walker (ed.), Parliamentary Election Results in Ireland, 1801-1922, Dublin, Royal Irish Academy, 1978
- Who Was Who, 1897-1916

Parliament of the United Kingdom
New constituency	Member of Parliament for South Cork; 1885 – 1892	Succeeded by Edward Barry
Preceded by Timothy Daniel Sullivan	Member of Parliament for Dublin College Green; 1892 – 1896	Succeeded by James Laurence Carew
