= Edward Barry (Irish nationalist politician) =

Irish politician

Edward Barry (1852 – 7 December 1927), sometimes known as Ned Barry, was an Irish nationalist politician who served as Member of Parliament (MP) for South Cork from 1892 to 1910.

Barry was elected to the United Kingdom House of Commons at the 1892 general election as an Anti-Parnellite Irish National Federation candidate, and joined the Irish Parliamentary Party when the split was resolved in early 1900. He held his seat until the general election in December 1910.

He also served as chairman of Clonakilty board of guardians.

Her died at his residence at Rathbarry, Rosscarbery, County Cork, on 7 December 1927.

Parliament of the United Kingdom
Preceded by J. E. Kenny	Member of Parliament for South Cork; 1892 – December 1910	Succeeded by John P. Walsh
