= Seán Hayes (Cork politician) =

Irish politician (1884–1928)

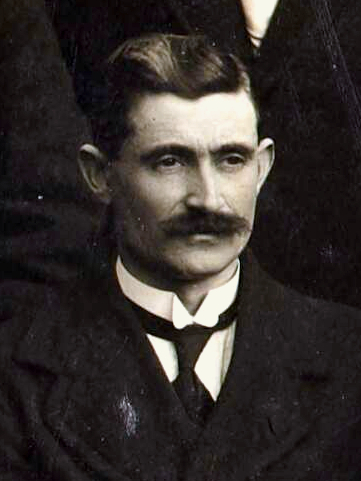
- Hayes in 1919

Teachta Dála
- In office May 1921 – August 1923
- Constituency: Cork Mid, North, South, South East and West
- In office December 1918 – May 1921
- Constituency: Cork West

Personal details
- Born: John Hayes; 29 March 1884 Glandore, County Cork, Ireland
- Died: 24 January 1928 (aged 43) Dublin, Ireland
- Party: Sinn Féin
- Spouse: Ciss Crowley

British Army military intelligence file for Seán Hayes

Seán Hayes (29 March 1884 – 24 January 1928) was a Sinn Féin member of Dáil Éireann in Ireland. He was a newspaper editor (the Cork County Southern Star of Skibbereen) and political propagandist.

John Hayes was born in Cregg, Glandore, County Cork in 1888, the son of Denis Hayes, a farmer. He joined the civil service working as a sorter in the GPO, London from 1904 to 1912, returning to work in Dublin following that time. Subsequently, working in Skibbereen for the weekly Southern Star as an editor and a manager. He was a participant in the 1916 Easter Rising at the GPO, Dublin, for which he was arrested and spent time interned in Wormwood Scrubs.

He was elected unopposed for Cork West at the 1918 general election. He did not take the seat he had won in the British House of Commons, but like other members of his party he joined the revolutionary First Dáil of 1919 to 1921. He represented the constituency of Cork Mid, North, South, South East and West from 1921 to 1923. He became a member of the pro-Treaty faction of Sinn Féin before the 1922 general election. He did not seek re-election at the 1923 general election.

Hayes was arrested by the British forces during a raid on party offices in Dublin in November 1919. As a result, he was sentenced to three months imprisonment. He was re-arrested in 1920 during the War of Independence. He was a member of the Irish Republican Army. He was also reputedly a member of Tom Barry's Flying Column in West Cork.

He married Ciss Crowley from Dunmanway, County Cork. They lived in Clontarf, Dublin. He died on 24 January 1928, and was buried in Glasnevin Cemetery on 26 January.

== Sources ==
- Who's Who of British Members of Parliament: Vol. III, edited by M. Stenton and S. Lees (The Harvester Press 1979)
- Townshend, Charles, Easter 1916: the Irish rebellion (London 2006)
- Townshend, C, The Republic: The Fight For Irish Independence (London 2014)

Parliament of the United Kingdom
Preceded by Daniel O'Leary	Member of Parliament for Cork West; 1918–1922	Constituency abolished
Oireachtas
New constituency	Teachta Dála for Cork West; 1918–1921	Constituency abolished

Dáil	Election	Deputy (Party)	Deputy (Party)	Deputy (Party)	Deputy (Party)	Deputy (Party)	Deputy (Party)	Deputy (Party)	Deputy (Party)
2nd	1921	Seán MacSwiney (SF)	Seán Nolan (SF)	Seán Moylan (SF)	Daniel Corkery (SF)	Michael Collins (SF)	Seán Hales (SF)	Seán Hayes (SF)	Patrick O'Keeffe (SF)
3rd	1922	Michael Bradley (Lab)	Thomas Nagle (Lab)	Seán Moylan (AT-SF)	Daniel Corkery (AT-SF)	Michael Collins (PT-SF)	Seán Hales (PT-SF)	Seán Hayes (PT-SF)	Daniel Vaughan (FP)
4th	1923	Constituency abolished. See Cork North and Cork West							
