= December 1910 United Kingdom general election in Ireland =

- 3–19 December 1910

103 of the 670 seats to the House of Commons
- Turnout: 74.8% (▼5.5 pp)
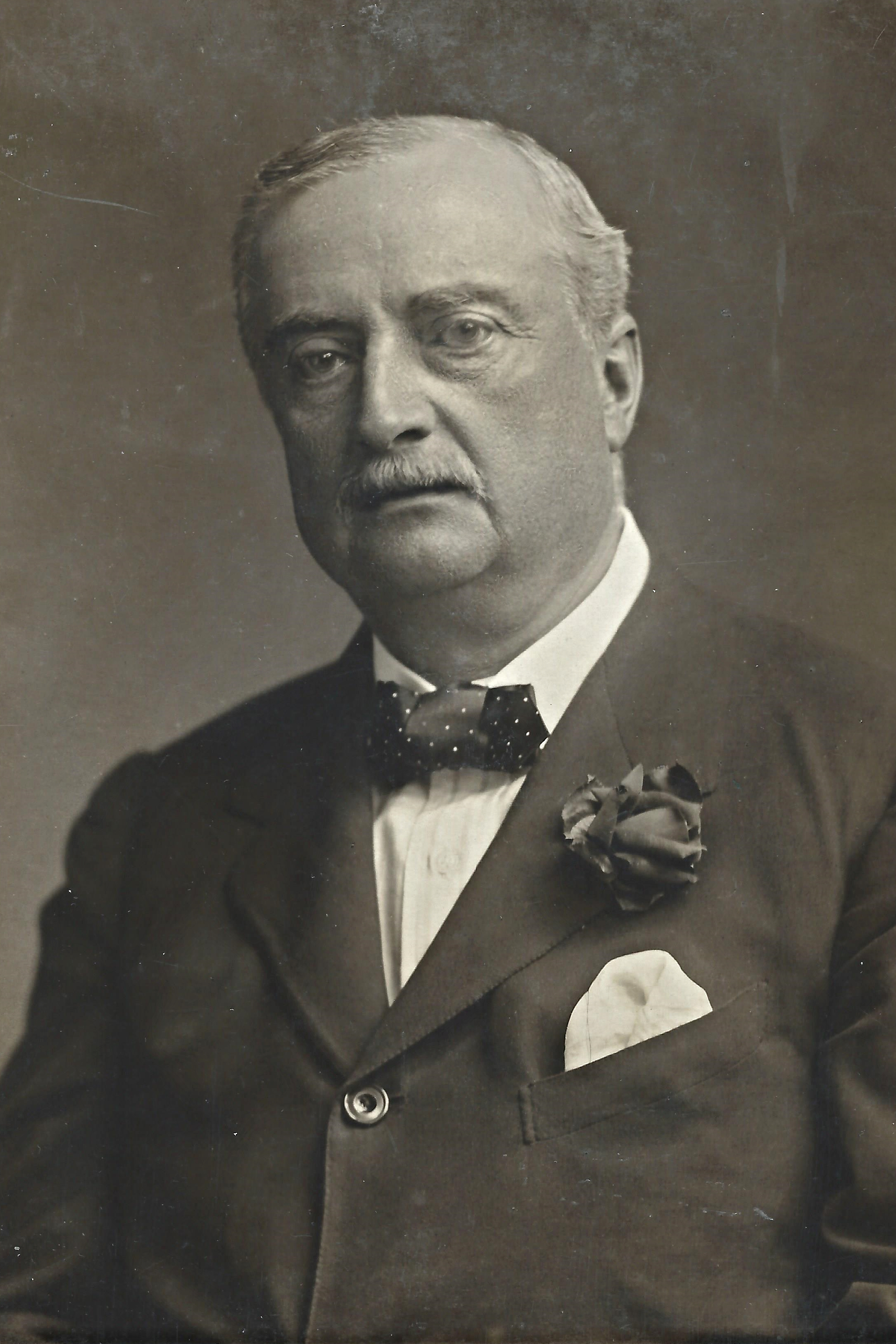

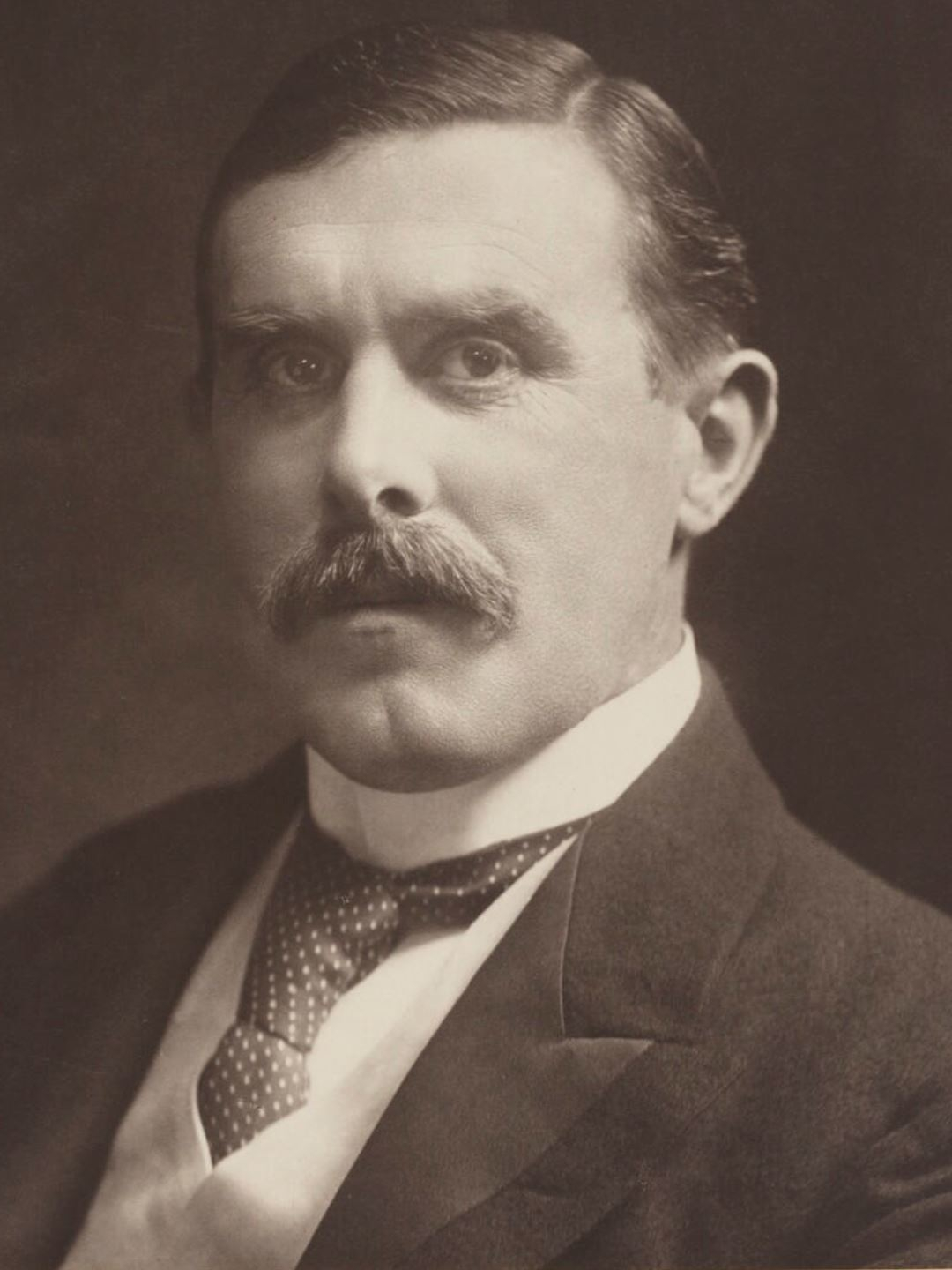

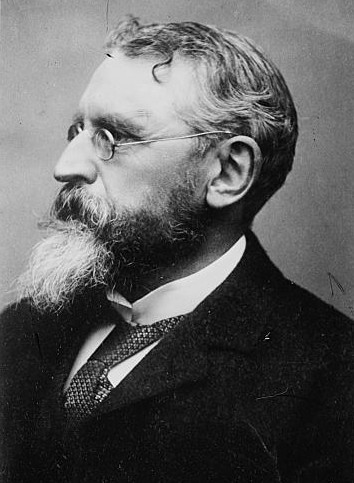

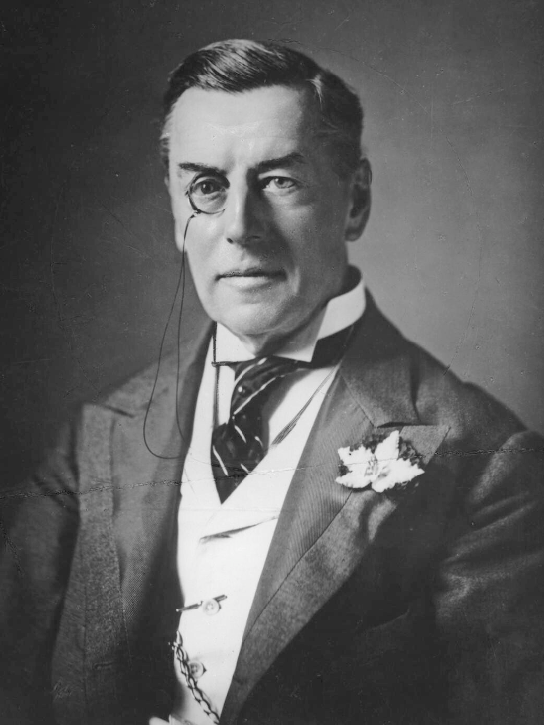

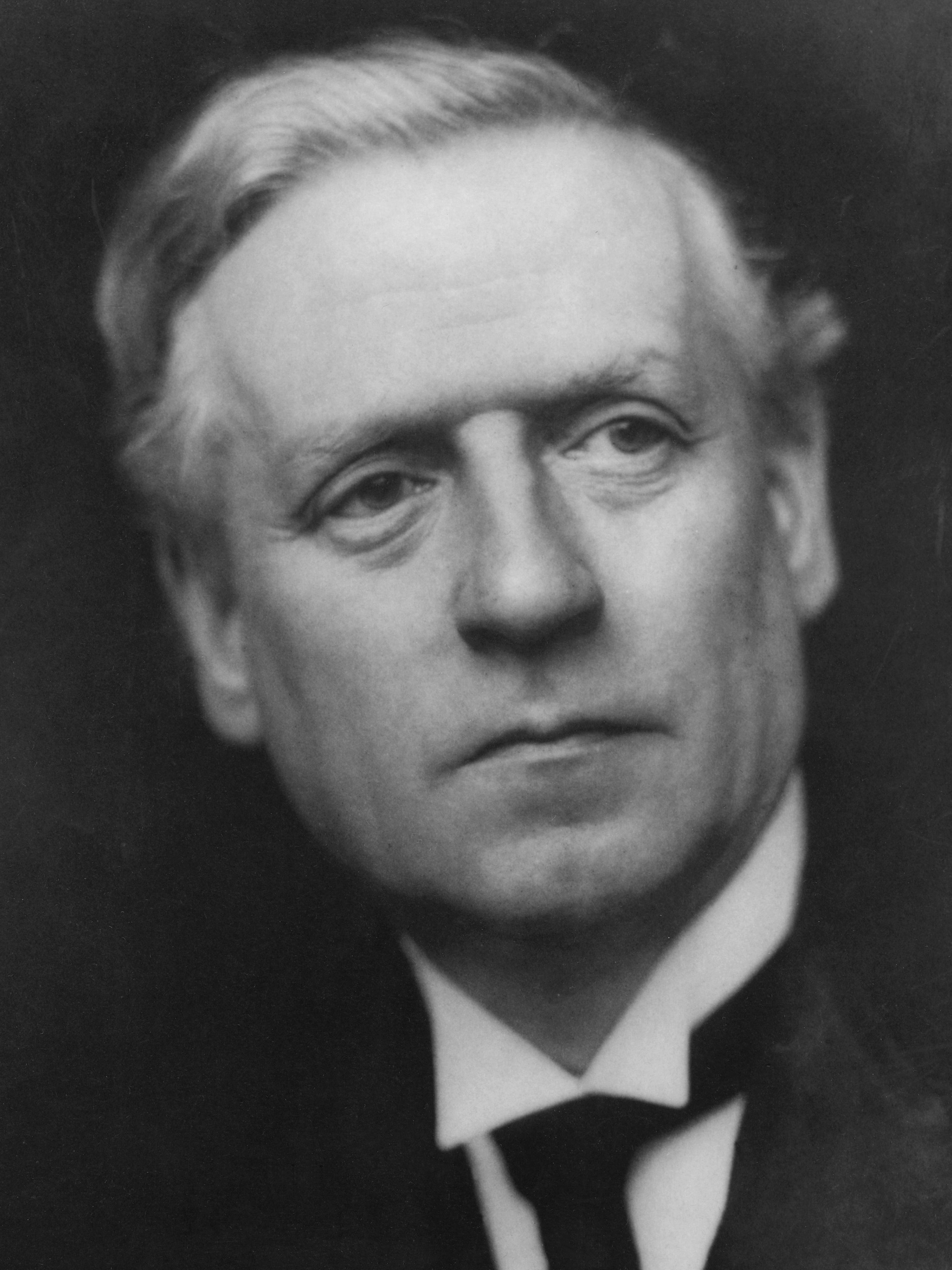
	First party	Second party	Third party
Leader	John Redmond	Viscount Midleton	William O'Brien
Party	Irish Parliamentary	Irish Unionist	All-for-Ireland
Alliance		Conservative-Liberal Unionist
Leader since	6 February 1900	10 February 1910	15 January 1910
Leader's seat	Waterford City	House of Lords	Cork City
Last election	70 seats, 33.4%	18 seats, 27.9%	8 seats, 12.7%
Seats won	73	16	8
Seat change	▲3	▼2	Steady
Popular vote	92,702	46,044	30,322
Percentage	42.7%	23.6%	17.2%
Swing	▲9.3 pp	▼4.3 pp	▲4.5 pp
	Fourth party	Fifth party
Leader	Joseph Chamberlain	H. H. Asquith
Party	Liberal Unionist	Liberal
Alliance	Conservative-Liberal Unionist
Leader since	1903	30 April 1908
Leader's seat	Birmingham West	East Fife
Last election	3 seats, 4.8%	1 seat, 9.6%
Seats won	3	1
Seat change	Steady	Steady
Popular vote	10,364	19,003
Percentage	5.0%	9.6%
Swing	▲0.2 pp	Steady
- Results of the 1910 election in Ireland. Cork City was a two-seat constituency, in this case both seats were won by the All-for Ireland League.

From 3 to 10 December 1910, the December 1910 United Kingdom general election was held in Ireland. Of the 670 seats in the House of Commons, 103 were in Ireland; 101 represented 100 county and borough territorial constituencies, with 2 seats representing Cork City; and two additional seats represented the Dublin University wherein only graduates of the university could vote.

Though the national result was a deadlock between the Conservatives and the Liberals, the result in Ireland was, as was the trend by now, a large victory for the Irish Parliamentary Party. The IPP supported the Liberals to form a government after the election. This was to be the party's last victory, however. Due to the outbreak of World War I in 1914, the next general election would not be held until 1918, by which time events both in Ireland and Britain and outside would conspire to see the rise of a new nationalist party, Sinn Féin, and the subsequent demise of the IPP.

It was the government formed by this election which brought in the final Home Rule Bill in 1912, enacted as the Government of Ireland Act 1914. The outbreak of the war led to its delay and eventual abandonment in response to the rise of Sinn Féin.

== Candidates ==
Below is a table summarising the candidates of the December 1910 general election in Ireland, excluding those who stood in the University constituency of Dublin University.

Affiliation	Candidates
Irish Parliamentary Party	80
Irish Unionist Party	23
All-for-Ireland League	21
Liberal Party	7
Independent Nationalist	4
Liberal Unionist Party	3 (Note: Candidates stood in North Antrim, South Londonderry and South Tyrone.)
Independent Unionist	2 (Note: The candidates that stood were Thomas Sloan stood in Belfast South and James Leslie Wanklyn in Galway Borough.)
Total	140

== Analysis ==
=== Nationalists ===
The Irish Parliamentary Party under John Redmond continued the run of success it had enjoyed since the 1880s, winning most seats in Leinster, Munster and Connacht. The party increased its seats from 70 to 73, taking two from the Irish Unionist Party and two other from All-for-Ireland and 1 from an Independent Nationalist, however, losing 2 to All-for-Ireland.

The Nationalist All-for-Ireland League, lost two seats in Counties Louth and Mayo ––being South Mayo and North Louth–– but gained two in County Cork, effectively isolating it to that county. All-for-Ireland therefore held 8 seats. These were its two seats in Cork City, with the party already holding the other of the two seats, along with Mid Cork, North Cork, North East Cork, South East Cork and West Cork. It also gained South Cork from the IPP.

Independent Nationalists held seats in South Monaghan and North Westmeath, however the IPP won East Kerry from an Independent Nationalist.

The war caused an unprecedented eight-year gap between this election and the next one. As a result, a large number of by-elections were held over the parliament's term. 1917 saw the first electoral victory for a new nationalist party, Sinn Féin, which won its first seat in the Roscommon North by-election of February 1917. The party would gain more seats in further by-elections, precipitating its landslide victory over the I.P.P. in the 1918 general election. Among the Sinn Féin MPs elected during this time were future Taoiseach and President of Ireland Éamon de Valera and future President of the Executive Council W. T. Cosgrave. Sinn Féin's cause was not Home rule but rather complete independence for an Irish Republic. The party and its members had been heavily involved in the Easter Rising of 1916, in which an unofficial republic had been declared. Its elected MPs operated by a policy of abstentionism from Westminster. Sinn Féin would use its success in the next election to form its own extra-legal parliament, Dáil Éireann in Dublin.

=== Unionists and Liberal Unionists ===
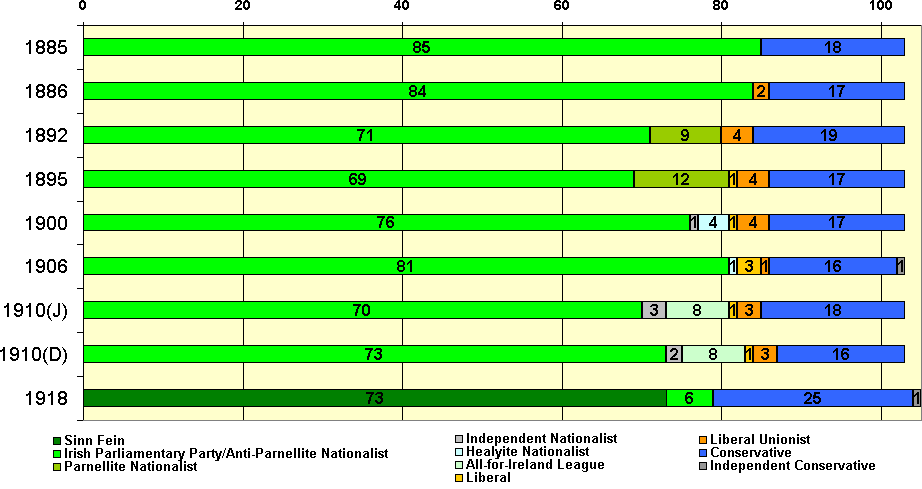
Graph of Irish UK MPs 1885–1918 in numbers

The Irish Unionist Party, led by new leader Viscount Midleton, in its national affiliation under the Conservative Party Whip, and its parliamentary allies the Liberal Unionist Party held most of their seats.

The Irish Unionists retained their northern seats of Belfast East, Belfast North, East Antrim, Mid Antrim, South Antrim, Londonderry City, North Londonderry, Mid Armagh, North Armagh, East Down, North Down, West Down and North Fermanagh. It also retained both its seats in Dublin University unopposed.

However, it otherwise lost Mid Tyrone, which it had won in the previous election, to the Irish Parliamentary Party. It also lost South Dublin to the Parliamentary Party. Consequently, the Irish Unionists retained the vast majority of it seats, but lost 2 with a swing of around 4.3% from it to 23.6%.

Much like in the previous election, records show some confusion in the division of seats between the Unionists and the Liberal Unionists. These seats were South Londonderry, North Antrim and South Tyrone. Brian M. Walker's collations for this election had pointed toward the Liberal Unionists holding no seats at the election, with all seats being held by the Unionists; however, later amended South Londonderry in the appendix to show a long-term Liberal Unionist MP John Gordon holding Londonderry South from the previous election. Later research by Liberal Unionist historian Wesley Ferris has subsequently presented that both Andrew Horner in South Tyrone and Peter Kerr-Smiley in North Antrim were, in fact, Liberal Unionists and therefore held the seats for the party.

As such the Liberal Unionist party held 3 seats in Ireland, with the party seeing a very small 0.2% swing in its favour. Overall between the Unionists and Liberal Unionists, the alliance saw a 4.1% drop in vote share, but an overall decrease by 2 seats when compared to January 1910. The alliance totalled 19 seats out of the 103 in Ireland. This was the last election in which the Liberal Unionists stood as a party. Though they had been electorally allied for decades, the Liberal Unionists officially merged with the Conservatives in 1912 to form the Conservative and Unionist Party.

=== Other parties ===
The Liberals again stood 7 candidates in Ireland, solely against Liberal Unionist and Irish Unionist Party candidates. It retained its single seat in North Tyrone, with no change in its vote share.

Although the Labour Party did not stand any candidates at this election, the Dublin College Green by-election of June 1915 saw the first electoral outing of the Irish Labour Party, founded two years previous by James Connolly and James Larkin. The party lost out to the IPP, and did not contest another election until the 1922 Irish general election.

== County and borough results ==
Party	Leader	Seats					Aggregate votes		
Party	Leader	Total	Gains	Losses	Net	Of total (%)	Total	Of total (%) (Note: Adjusted for multi-member constituencies.)	Change (%)
Irish Parliamentary	John; Redmond	73	5	2	▲3	72.3	92,702	42.7	▲9.3
Irish Unionist	Viscount; Midleton	14	0	2	▼2	15.8	46,044	23.6	▼4.3
All-for-Ireland	William; O'Brien	8	2	2	Steady	7.9	35,649	17.2	▲4.5
Liberal	H. H. Asquith	1	0	0	Steady	1.0	19,003	9.6	Steady
Liberal Unionist	Joseph; Chamberlain	3 (Note: North Antrim, South Londonderry and South Tyrone.)	0	0	Steady	3.0	10,364	5.0	▲0.2
Independent; Unionist	—N/a	0	0	0	Steady	—	2,925	1.4	▼0.3
Independent; Nationalist	—N/a	2	0	1	▼1	2.0	911	0.4	▼7.6
Total		101			0	100.0	207,598	100.0	0.0
Registered voters, and turnout							264,278 (Note: Electorate in contested constituencies. The total electorate was 683,767.)	74.8	▼5.5

=== Popular vote ===
Popular vote
IPP	42.7%
Irish Unionist	23.6%
All-for-Ireland	17.2%
Liberal	9.6%
Liberal Unionist	5.0%
Ind. Nationalist	0.4%

Popular vote (alliances)
IPP	42.7%
Con-LU	28.6%
All-for-Ireland	17.2%
Liberal	9.6%
Ind. Nationalist	0.4%

=== Parliament seats ===
Parliamentary seats
IPP	72.3%
Irish Unionist	15.8%
All-for-Ireland	7.9%
Liberal Unionist	3.0%
Ind. Nationalist	2.0%
Liberal	1.0%

Parliamentary seats (alliances)
IPP	72.3%
Con-LU	18.8%
All-for-Ireland	7.9%
Ind. Nationalist	2.0%
Liberal	1.0%

== Dublin University constituency result ==
December 1910 general election: Dublin University (2 seats)
Party	Candidate	Votes	%	±%
Irish Unionist	Edward Carson	Unopposed		
Irish Unionist	James Campbell	Unopposed		
Irish Unionist hold				
Irish Unionist hold				

== See also ==
- December 1910 United Kingdom general election in England
- December 1910 United Kingdom general election in Scotland
- December 1910 United Kingdom general election in Wales
- List of United Kingdom Parliament constituencies (1885–1918) by region
- History of Ireland (1801–1923)
- List of MPs elected in the December 1910 United Kingdom general election (Ireland)
- Parliamentary franchise in the United Kingdom 1885–1918
