= John Walsh (Irish politician) =

John Walsh (1856 – 26 August 1925) was a prominent Irish businessman, and a nationalist politician of the All-for-Ireland League. He was Member of Parliament (MP) for County Cork South from 1910 until 1918, taking his seat in the House of Commons of what was then the United Kingdom of Great Britain and Ireland.

Born in Bandon, County Cork, he was an extensive farmer and chairman of the Beamish and Crawford Bottling Co. Ltd. Cork., as well as head of J. P. Walsh & Co.. Was a member of the Cork County Council (1910–1920) in his capacity as chairman of the Bandon Rural District Council. J.P., co. Cork.

In the December 1910 general elections he was returned as MP for the constituency of South Cork, representing William O'Brien's All-for-Ireland League. Together with the other party members he did not contest his seat in the 1918 election.

He died at Kilbrittain on 26 August 1925 and was buried privately.

== Notes ==
Parliament of the United Kingdom
| Preceded by Edward Barry | Member of Parliament for South Cork; December 1910 – 1918 | Succeeded by Michael Collins |
