= All-for-Ireland League =

Defunct Irish nationalist political party

- Abbreviation: AFIL
- Leader: William O'Brien
- Chairman: James Gilhooly
- Founded: 1909
- Dissolved: 1918
- Ideology: Nonsectarian; Irish nationalism Liberalism
- Political position: Centre to centre-right
- Colours: Green

The All-for-Ireland League (AFIL) was an Irish, Munster-based political party (1909–1918). Founded by William O'Brien MP, it generated a new national movement to achieve agreement between the different parties concerned on the historically difficult aim of Home Rule for the whole of Ireland. The AFIL established itself as a separate non-sectarian party in the House of Commons of the United Kingdom of Great Britain and Ireland, binding a group of independent nationalists MPs to pursue a broader concept of Irish nationalism, a consensus of political brotherhood and reconciliation among all Irishmen, primarily to win Unionist consent to an All-Ireland parliamentary settlement.

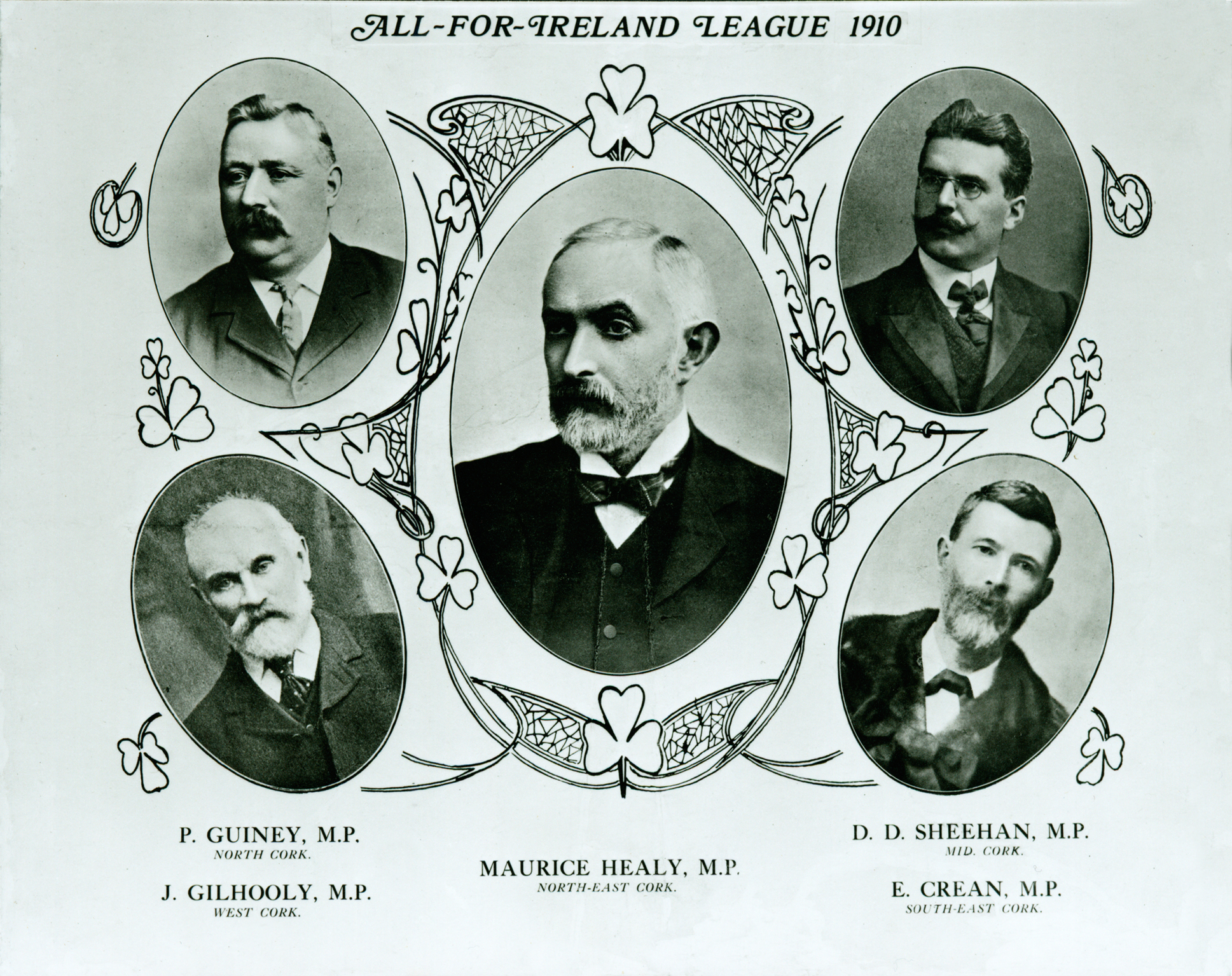
All-for-Ireland League group portrait of five of its Independent Members of Parliament, in the "Cork Free Press" 30 July 1910. These are: Patrick Guiney (North Cork), James Gilhooly (West Cork), Maurice Healy (North East Cork), D. D. Sheehan (Mid Cork) and Eugene Crean (South East Cork). The other MPs elected in January 1910 were: William O'Brien (Cork city), John O'Donnell (South Mayo) and Timothy Michael Healy (North Louth). Elected in December 1910 was John P. Walsh (South Cork). Maurice and Timothy Healy were brothers.

== Conciliation plus business ==
O'Brien's conciliatory initiation of the 1902 Land Conference, achieved with the backing of the United Irish League (UIL) which he had founded, led to agreement on the Land Purchase (Ireland) Act 1903, which resolved Ireland's century old land question. This was followed by the housing of agricultural labourers, settled under the Labourers (Ireland) Act 1906. With Irish local government already well established, O'Brien was convinced that to achieve the final hurdle of All-Ireland self-government, the success of the approach he used to win the Land Act, the "doctrine of conciliation" combined with "conference plus business", must also be applied to alleviate the fears and integrate the interests of the Protestant and Unionist community in their resistance to Irish Home Rule since 1886. The issue was a source of contention amongst a significant majority of Unionists (largely but not exclusively based in Ulster), who opposed Home Rule, fearing that a Catholic Nationalist ("Rome Rule") Parliament in Dublin would discriminate or retaliate against them, impose Roman Catholic doctrine, and impose tariffs on industry. While most of Ireland was primarily agricultural, six of the counties in Ulster were the location of heavy industry and would be affected by any tariff barriers imposed.

Following the success with the Land Purchase Act, the Irish Parliamentary Party (IPP) was long disrupted by internal dissensions after it had alienated William O'Brien from the party in November 1903. He was condemned by party leader John Dillon for allegedly making former tenant farmers less dependent on the party and for the manner in which he secured a new political base in Munster through his alliance with D. D. Sheehan and the Irish Land and Labour Association. In addition, forging further alliances with T. M. Healy and unionist devolutionists during 1904–05 in his engagement with the Irish Reform Association and ensuing support for the Irish Council Bill. By 1907 the country called for reunion of the split party ranks and in November O'Brien's proposals for his and other Independent's return to the Party were accepted. Their return to the Nationalist fold in mid-January 1908 was however to be short-lived, as conflict ensued from the government's intention to amend the Land Act 1903.

== Hibernian clash ==
O'Brien had always been gravely disturbed by the Irish Parliamentary Party's involvement with "that sinister sectarian secret society", the Ancient Order of Hibernians (AOH) also known as the Molly Maguires, or the Mollies – what he called "the most damnable fact in the history of this country", and was bitterly resentful and unsparing in his attacks upon it. AOH members represented deeply sectarian pseudo Gaelic-Catholic-nationalism of a Ribbon tradition, their Ulster Protestant counterpart the Orange Order. The AOH Grandmaster was a young Belfast man of remarkable political ability, Joseph Devlin MP, who attached himself to the Dillonite section of the Irish Party, as well as being General Secretary of its adopted United Irish League (UIL). Devlin was already known as "the real Chief Secretary of Ireland", his AOH spreading successfully and eventually saturating the entire island. Even in Dublin the AOH could draw large crowds and stage impressive demonstrations. In 1907, Devlin was able to assure John Redmond, the Irish Party leader, that a planned meeting of the UIL would be well attended because he would be able to get more than 400 AOH delegates to fill the hall.

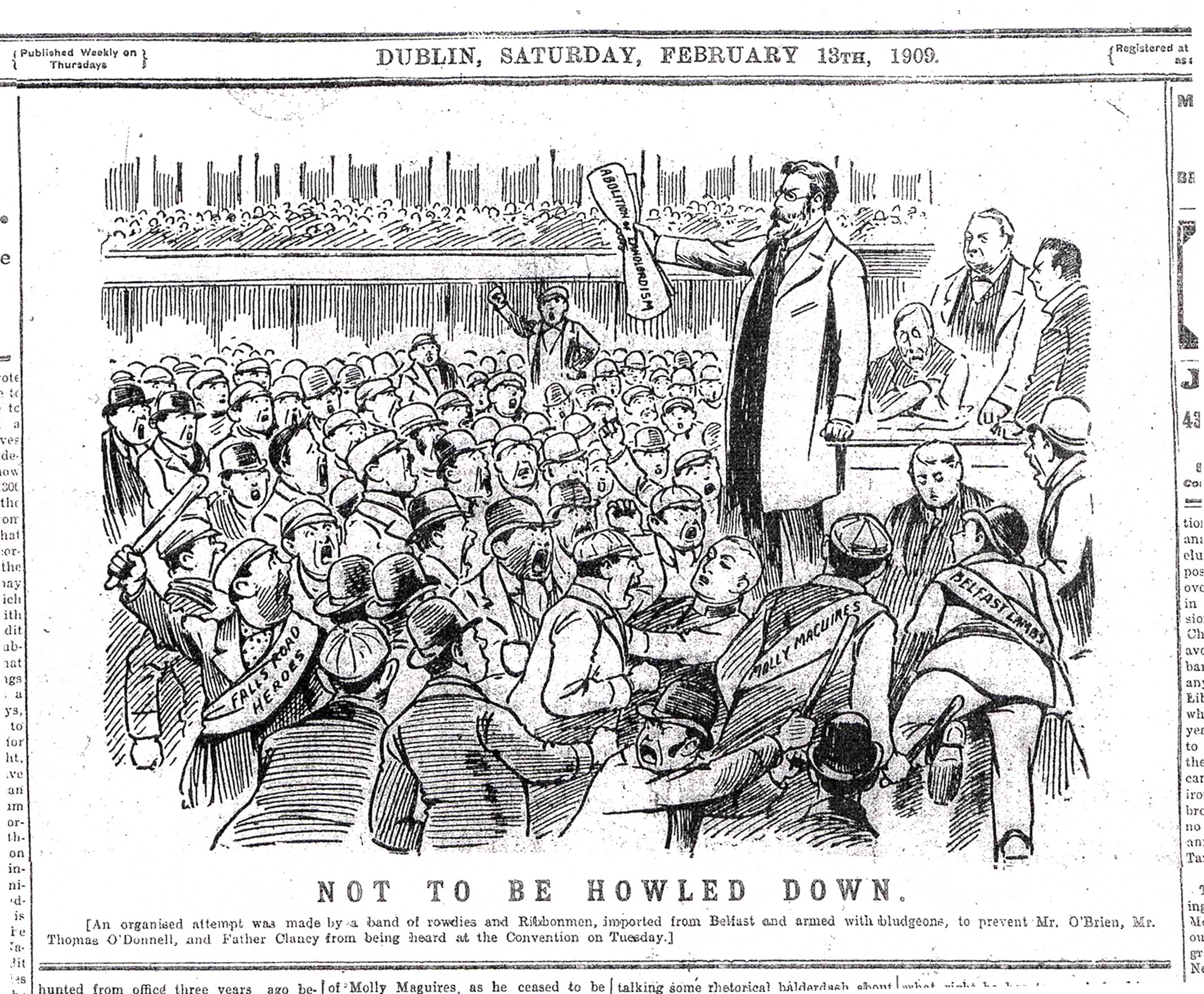
William O'Brien addressing the "Baton Convention" with Dillon, Redmond and Devlin looking on indifferently.

== Baton Convention ==
As prelude to O'Brien's formation of the AFIL, Redmond called a National Convention at the Mansion House, Dublin, 9 February 1909, to win support for a House of Commons bill introducing compulsory land purchase while curtailing funding of tenant land purchase under the Birrell Land Act (1909). Over 3000 UIL delegates attended. Redmond, who chaired the meeting, claimed it would burden the British Treasury and local ratepayers excessively. O'Brien argued that the curtailing Bill would kill land purchase by provoking refusal by landlords to sell and worsen relations between tenants and landlords. The convention was obviously loaded against O'Brien when delegates suspected of supporting him were excluded at the entrance and assaulted in "probably the stormiest meeting ever held by constitutional nationalists".

When he attempted to speak O'Brien was howled down by various contingents of Belfast Hibernians and midland cattle-drivers, their presence pre-organised by Devlin's AOH organisation. Its stewards, armed with batons, attacked O'Brien's follower who had gained entrance, their general order to "Let no one with a 'Cork accent' get near the platform". From which the event earned the name Baton Convention. When Eugene Crean MP for South East Cork was attacked on the platform, it developed into a mêlée with Devlin and his lodgemen, after D. D. Sheehan and James Gilhooly, MP for West Cork, intervened against Crean's assailants, this in Redmond's presence. Others targeted were members of the Young Ireland Branch, Frank Cruise O'Brien and Francis Sheehy-Skeffington, who called Devlin a brainless bludgeoner.

== League launched ==
Regarding himself as having been driven from the party by Hibernian hooligans, O'Brien's subsequent move was to officially constitute his new movement, the "All-for-Ireland League", its embryonic origins – the successful Land Conference of 1902, which he launched at a public rally in Kanturk in March 1909. It was immediately openly denounced by Redmond, and at an Irish party meeting held on 23 March, the party voted fifty to one that membership in the League was incompatible with party membership. O'Brien suffered a health breakdown in April, and retired from politics to Italy to recuperate. Control of the fledgling AFIL passed to a Provisional Committee led by D. D. Sheehan (MP) as Honorary Secretary, its foremost task to promote the League's principles and to hold O'Brien's seat in Cork at the inevitable by-election until his return.

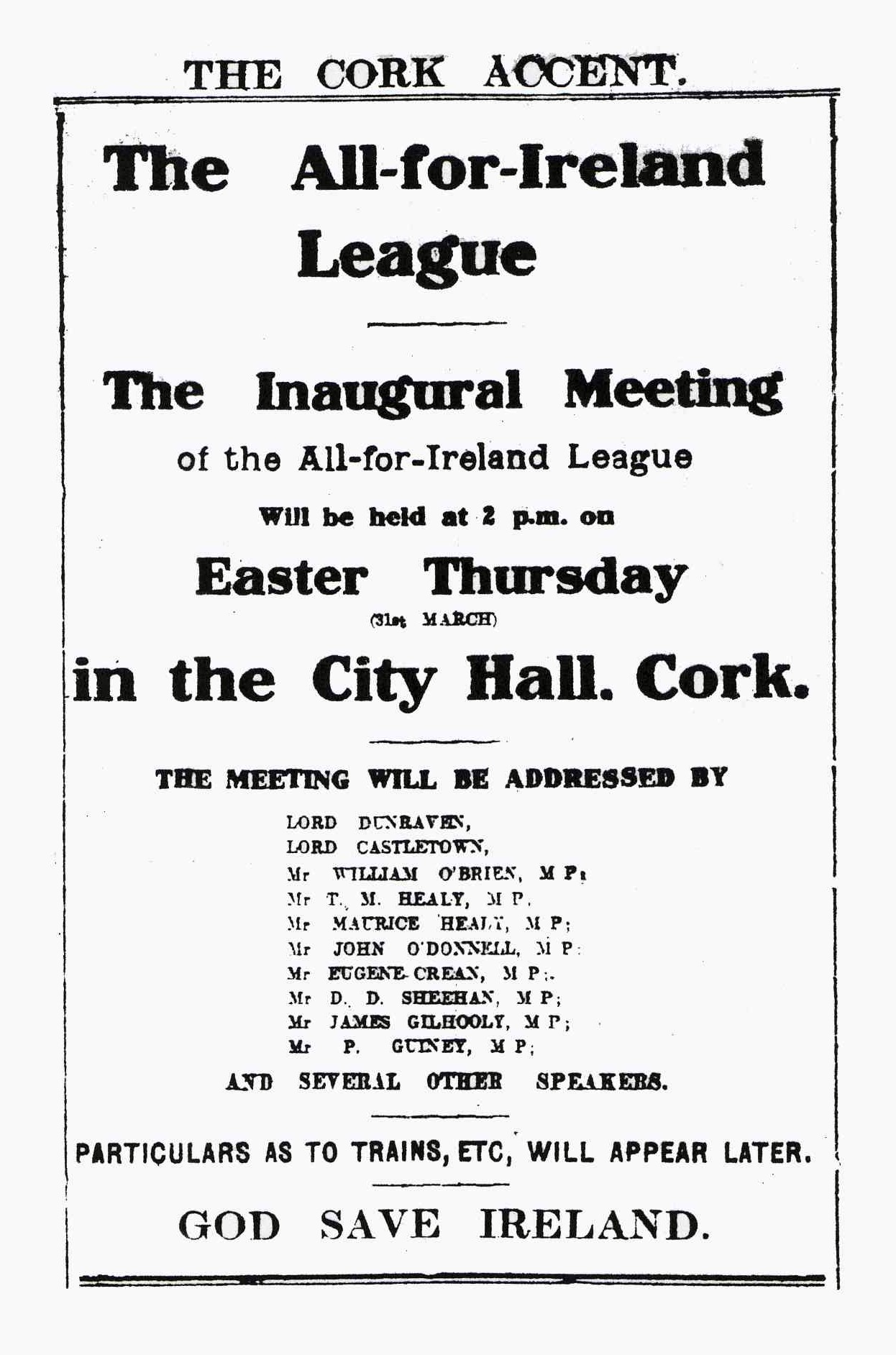
Announcement of the League's Inaugural Meeting 31 March 1910

From Italy O'Brien looked to an alliance with Arthur Griffith's moderate Sinn Féin movement through emissaries James Brady (a Dublin solicitor), John Shawe-Taylor and Tim Healy. O'Brien offered funds for Sinn Féin candidates to run in Dublin and funds to run its paper Sinn Féin, in return for Sinn Féin support of his candidates in the south. A special Sinn Feín executive council meeting called 20 December 1909 seriously considered these overtures, many present in favour of co-operation. Sinn Féin's William Sears reported the result: "Regret cannot cooperate because the Constitution will not allow us. Mr. Griffith was in favour of cooperation if possible". Nevertheless, in the following years O'Brien and his party continued to associate itself with Griffith's movement both in and out of Parliament. In June 1918, Griffith asked O'Brien to have the writ moved for his candidacy in the East Cavan by-election (moved by AFIL MP Eugene Crean) when Griffith was elected with a sizeable majority.

O'Brien returned from Italy for the January 1910 general election, which was marked by considerable turbulences in the county Cork constituencies. His electoral success must have exceeded his expectations. Eleven Nationalists independent of the official party returned, seven of them his League's followers who won all their contests. It rejuvenated his project of the All-for-Ireland League, as well as a new newspaper The Cork Accent, alluding to events at the Baton Convention.

He next framed the League's programme containing several unique points:

1. extension of the conciliatory spirit of the Land Conference to the larger problem of Irish self-government;
2. distrust of the Irish Party's alliance with the Liberals and specific opposition to Lloyd George's budget and Birrel's revision of the land settlement; and
3. hostility to the Ancient Order of Hibernians.

The League held its inaugural public meeting on 31 March 1910 in the City Hall, Cork. Its rules and constitution were formulated and endorsed at a public meeting on 12 April, where it announced its Home Rule manifesto and political policies to be:

- "the union and active co-operation in every department of our national life of all Irish men and women of all classes and creeds who believe in the principles of domestic self-government for Ireland.
- For the accomplishment of this object the surest means were to be a combination of all the elements of the Irish population in a spirit of mutual tolerance and patriotic goodwill, such as shall guarantee to the Protestant minority of our fellow-countrymen inviolable security for their rights and liberties, and win the friendship of the people of Great Britain without distinction of party."

== "Three C s" Banner ==
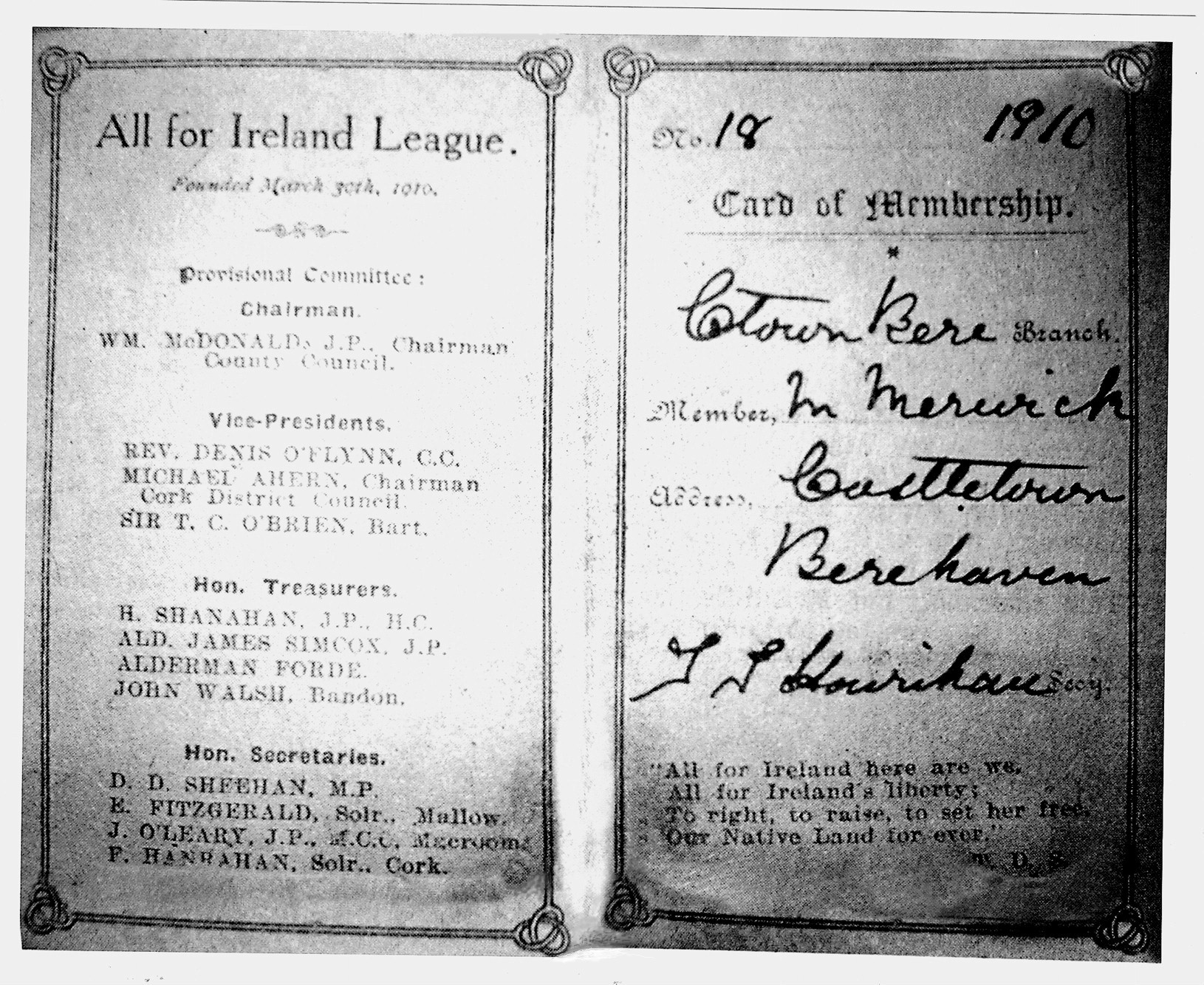
League's membership card endorsed: All for Ireland here are we, All for Ireland's liberty; To right, to raise, to set her free, Our Native Land for ever. T.D.S.

The application of the AFIL's principles of "Conference, Conciliation and Consent" (the Three C s), were to win All-Ireland Home Rule – or constitutional nationalism rather than an ultimately doomed path of militant physical force.

Many of the leading Protestant gentry of Munster, and representatives of the wealthy Protestant business and professional community joined the League. Lord Dunraven, Lord Barrymore, Lord Mayo and Lord Castletown, Sir John Keane of Cappoquin, Villiers Stuart of Dromana, Moreton Frewen and future, and last Irish Free State Senate Chairman Thomas Westropp Bennett (a first generation Roman Catholic, Gaelic speaking, from an old County Limerick Protestant family) were a few of the more notable adherents who supplied political and financial support. Even amongst the Orangemen the spirit of patriotism was stirring – hands were stretched out from Ulster to the Catholics of the South. Lord Rossmore, once Grandmaster of the Orange Institution, joined the League, Sharman Crawford and others. Unionism was declared by them to be a "discredited creed". Nationalist and Unionists were called upon to recognise the unwisdom of perpetuating a suicidal strife which sacrificed them to religious bigotry and the political exigencies of English partie. League Chairperson was James Gilhooly (MP), Honorary Secretary D. D. Sheehan (MP). A Central London branch was founded by Dr J. G. Fitzgerald (MP) as chairman, suggesting some disenchantment with his former Parnellite colleagues including John Redmond. Canon Sheehan of Doneraile, a founder member, spoke and wrote enthusiastically in favour of the Leagues doctrines. The Cork Free Press, published by O'Brien, appeared for the first time on 11 June 1910 as the League's official organ and organiser. It was a newspaper in the fullest sense, superseding the Cork Accent and was one of the three great radical newspapers published in Ireland – the other two being The Nation, published in Dublin in the 1840s, and The Northern Star, published in Belfast in the 1790s.

=== League's manifesto ===
Canon Sheehan wrote the manifesto of the movement for the first number of the Cork Free Press, and asked in a very long editorial:

We are a generous people; and yet we are told we must keep up a sectarian bitterness to the end; and the Protestant Ascendancy has been broken down, only to build Catholic Ascendancy on its ruins. Are we in earnest about our country at all or are we seeking to perpetuate our wretchedness by refusing the honest aid of Irishmen? Why should we throw unto the arms of England those children of Ireland who would be our most faithful allies, if we did not seek to disinherit them? A weaker brother disinherited by a stranger will naturally be his enemy ...
England owes her world-wide power ... to her supreme talent of attracting and assimilating the most hostile elements of her subject races ... Ireland, alas, has had the talent of estranging and expelling her own children, and turning them ... into her deadliest enemies. It is time that all this should cease, if we still retain the ambition of creating a nation.

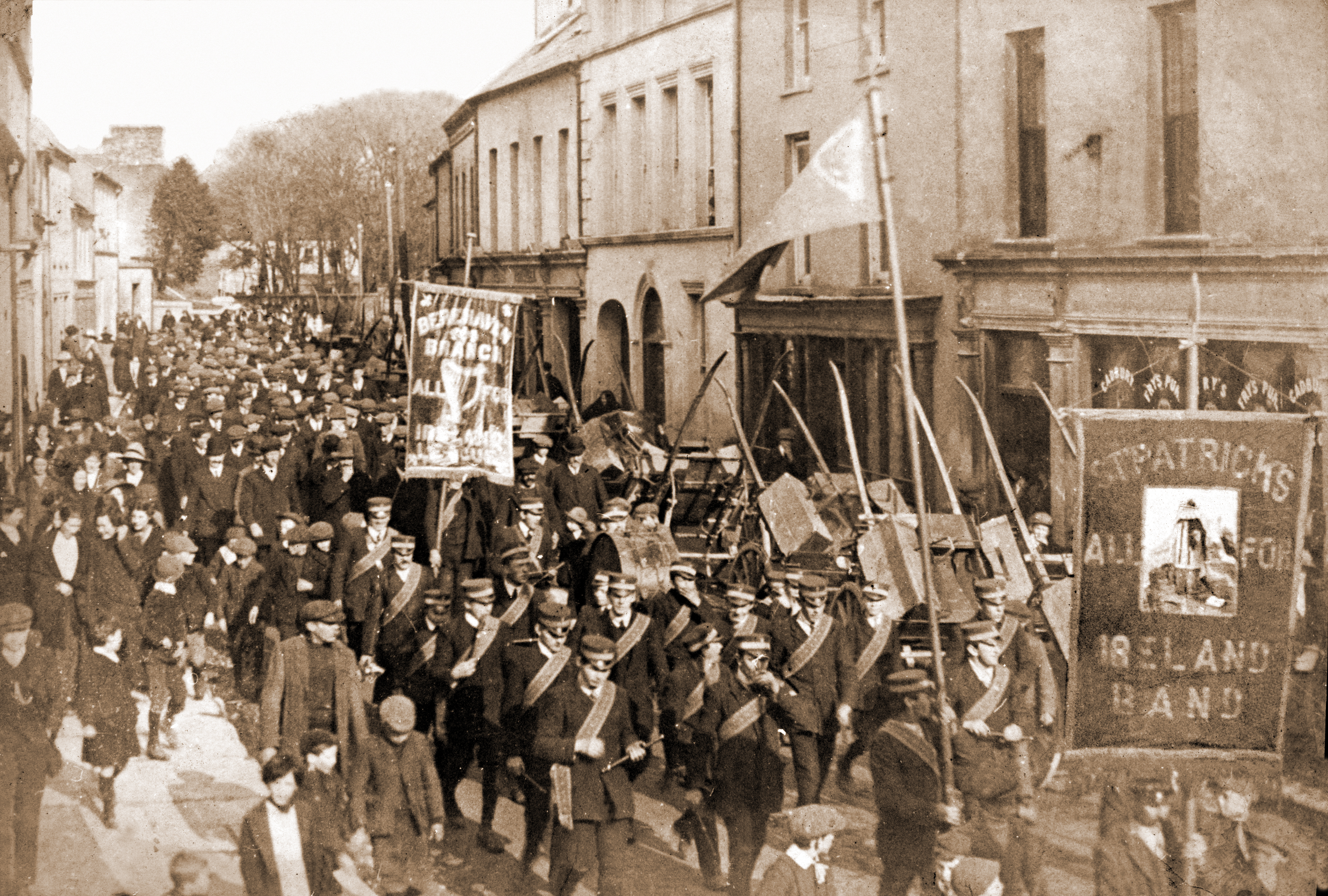
All-for-Ireland fife and drum band parading through Castletownbere County Cork in 1910. Towns often had rival AFIL and AOH bands, occasionally clashing on Sunday parades.

== Decisive election ==
Throughout the summer and autumn of 1910 the growth in strength of the AFIL continued in areas previously dominated by the UIL, which gave rise to considerable conflict. It was accompanied by repeatedly violent IPP-UIL hostilities towards O'Brien and his lieutenants wherever they endeavoured to spread his gospel of Conciliation. AFIL supporters retaliated with equally aggressive street fighting, at times RIC police forces being called upon in several towns to disperse rioting crowds. A renewed election was called on by the Prime Minister Asquith on 28 November due to a parliamentary stalemate at Westminster. In the up-and-coming election O'Brien's task was truly formidable. It was a case of AFIL versus UIL, his candidates earmarked for rejection not alone by the Irish Party's Hibernians. There was considerable adversity to O'Brien and his followers amongst many Catholic churchmen, who long regarded him as at heart an unreconstructed Parnellite, and latently anti-clerical. The Roman Catholic Church's forces were mobilised even more thoroughly against him when Cardinal Michael Logue expressed himself against O'Brien's and his League, and disapproved of 'Conciliationism'. All three County Cork RC bishops opposed O'Brien.

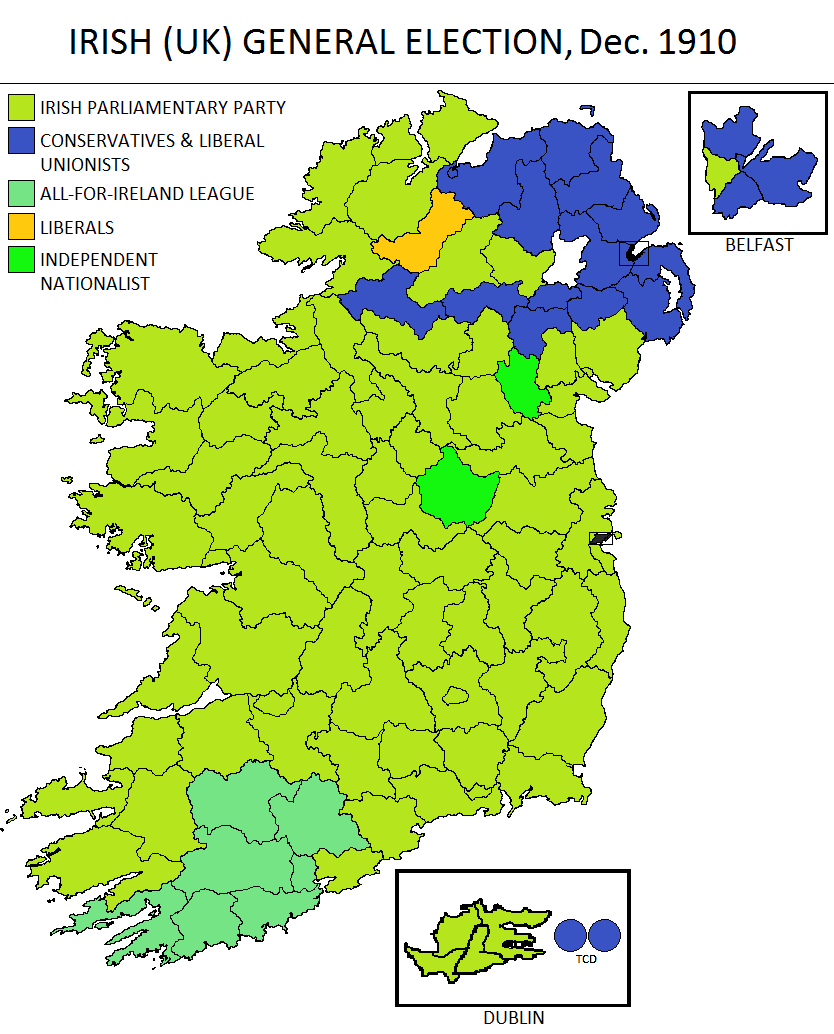
Distribution of party seats in the December 1910 election

O'Brien's antagonism towards the AOH was counter-productive in mobilising the Catholic clergy, with one or two exceptions, behind the official IPP-UIL candidates. O'Brien felt as if he were under siege from clerical forces and wrote despondently "We have to deal with a confederacy of the priests of this country to strangle the AFIL and to strike down its standard-bearers". The competition between the rival nationalist parties in Cork was, at times, extremely violent. In the general and council election contests of 1910 and 1914 in the city, a total of 11 people were shot and two killed in clashes between IPP-UIL and AFIL supporters. Many more injured in street brawls between the rival parties

== Supreme in Cork ==
Attempts to carry the contest into Irish Party territory failed; a meeting at Crossmolina, County Mayo ended almost fatally when revolver shots were fired and O'Brien's audience routed by toughs and priests. In the December 1910 general elections, the League, dependent almost entirely upon O'Brien's personal following amongst the rural community in Munster (the bulwark of Sheehan's Land and Labour Association) and though woefully lacking in clerical support, returned eight AFIL MPs (three further Nationalist Independents were also returned). In the end it was Cork, the country's largest county, which vindicated O'Brien's policies returning the eight seats to form his new political party. It included Timothy Healy who the previous November created the unusual AFIL coalescence of Healyism and O'Brienism. Healy lost his seat in North Louth, but was returned in a 1911 by-election after Moreton Frewen retired his seat in North East Cork.

The Cork Free Press gave the total Redmondite vote in the country as 92,709, and the Independent Nationalist's vote, largely supporting the principles of the League, as 39,729 (30.46%) which included the constituencies outside of Cork contested by fourteen AFIL candidates (Armagh south, Dublin Harbour, Kerry south and east, Limerick city, Limerick west and east, Louth north, Mayo west, Tipperary mid, Waterford west and Wexford south).

== Striking proposals ==
The AFIL party was convinced that the success of an Irish Parliament must depend upon it being won with the consent rather than by the compulsion of the Protestant minority. In a 1911 letter to the Prime Minister H.H. Asquith, the party specifically proposed Dominion Home Rule as the wisest of all solutions to the Irish question.

After the introduction of a new Third Home Rule Bill by Asquith in April 1912, an AFIL conference held in Cork on 25 May declared whole-hearted support of the Bill, subject to three amendments:

- firstly: safeguards providing against the apprehensions (however imaginary) of Ulster;
- secondly: the completion of the abolition of landlordism by the use of Imperial credit;
- thirdly: the empowering of the Irish Parliament to raise, as well as to spend, its revenue.

During the House of Commons second reading and debate of the third Government of Ireland Bill on 13 June 1912, an amendment had been moved to exclude the counties Antrim, Armagh, Down and Londonderry from the provisions of Home Rule, Sir Edward Carson, leader of the Ulster Unionists, called on Redmond to "listen to the Cork members", when he said:

There has been an attempt, and I admit it fully and frankly, by some few Irish members, led, I believe by the hon. Member for Cork (ironic Nationalist laughter). See how it is laughed at ! (Unionist cheers). The hon. Member for Cork is a Home Ruler. I differ from him just as much as I differ from any other Home Ruler. But let me say, that movement was a movement of conciliation. It commenced to a large extent in the Land Purchase Act that was passed by my right hon. friend, the Member for Dover (Mr Wyndham). The hon. Member for Cork, seeing the benefits of the Acts as they resulted in Ireland, has rightly adhered to it, and to every promise he made at the time, and largely because of that he is now driven outside the Irish Party. When the hon. Gentleman and some others proceeded to what they call trying to reconcile Ulster and the Protestants of Ireland, they made speeches which, if they had been made by the majority of the Nationalists for the last twenty years might, I admit, possibly have made some effect on some of the Unionists of Ireland. Their idea was certainly a worthy idea, nobody can deny that, of bringing about reconciliation and better feeling, and the moment they do that they are denounced and they are boycotted and they are persecuted. The hon. Member for Cork ----

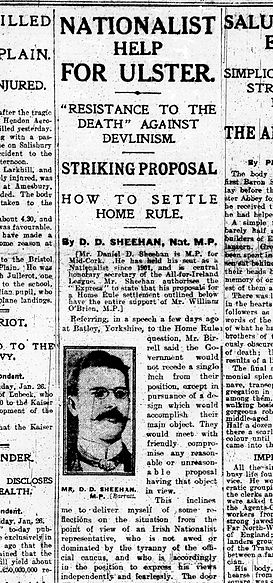
Proposals for Ulster settlement, Daily Express, 27 January 1914

The Speaker at this point called Carson to order, amid jeers.

In the course of the final two readings of the Bill in 1913 and 1914, O'Brien and his AFIL colleagues fought untiringly in the spirit of their electoral mandate for a non-sectarian solution to the "Irish question" and were adamant that through co-operation on specific matters of common interest to build and win Unionist confidence, goodwill and consent, and that there should be no limit to the concessions offered to Ulster to have it participate in an All-Ireland parliament. "Any price for a United Ireland, but partition never".

In January 1914 both O'Brien in his Cork Free Press and D. D. Sheehan in the London Daily Express simultaneously published a list of concessions they ascertained as acceptable to Ulster, enabling its participation in a Dublin parliament. The proposals in brief were:

1. That the representatives of Ulster should have an exercisable veto right over Irish legislation;
2. Ulster should have sixty representatives in the Irish House of Commons, out of a total of 164;
3. All representatives of the Irish Civil Service should be by competitive examination;
4. North-East Ulster should have its own appointment of court judges, district magistrates, inspectors of education.

== Historic protest ==
During the final stages of the second reading and debate on the Third Home Rule Bill in the House of Commons, which was accompanied by Asquith's guarantee that it would never be enforced without an Amending Bill enacting the exclusion of the six Ulster counties with a Protestant majority, O'Brien made a powerful lengthy speech on 1 April 1914 reiterating at length his proposals to enable Ulster remain within an All-Ireland settlement, by means of a suspensory veto upon any bill passed by a Dublin parliament, amongst other rights and protections. Stating "I condemn and abhor with all my heart the preparations of the Ulster Volunteers for even the possibility of slaughter between Irishmen and Irishmen". Otherwise Ireland once divided would remain divided and 'the line on which you are presently travelling will never bring you anything except division and disaster'.

When the Bill finally passed the Commons on 25 May, O'Brien's speech was the only protest by an Irish representative. In the course of his speech O'Brien said (in extract):

The game was lost for Ireland the day the honourable member for Waterford (Mr. Redmond) and his friends consented to the Partition of Ireland. Bitterly opposing any genuine concession to Ulster at the right time, now consenting to the concession of all which will not only fail to conciliate Ulster, but will rouse millions of the Irish race in revolt against your Bill. ... Any Bill that proposes to cut off Ulster permanently or temporarily from the body of Ireland is to me worse than nothingness, ... We are ready for almost any conceivable concession to Ulster that will have the effect of uniting Ireland, but we will struggle to our last breath against a proposal which will divide her, and divide her eternally, if Ireland's own representatives are once consenting parties. ... we regard this Bill as no longer a Home Rule Bill, but as a Bill for the murder of Home Rule as we have understood it all our lives, and we can have no hand, act or part in the operation. (Loud All-for-Ireland cheers).

The All-for-Irelanders resisted what they saw as a violation of Ireland's national unity, and holding to their pledge abstained in protest from voting for the Bill. As a result, they were assailed with accusations of being 'factionists' and 'traitors' by the Irish Party members. Instead, the uncompromising IPP/AOH stand taken by the Redmond-Dillon-Devlin alliance killed All-Ireland Home Rule, by aiming to force Ulster's acquiescence; "no Orange vetoes, no concessions, Ulster must follow", Ulster's Unionist leader Sir Edward Carson, proclaiming "Ulster can never be coerced, Ulster will fight and Ulster will be right".

== Calamities unfold ==
August saw the sudden beginning and the involvement of Ireland in World War I . The Government of Ireland Act 1914 receive the Royal Assent in September, but was suspended for the duration of the war. O'Brien and his party rallied in support of the Allied cause in support of Britain's war effort, as did the IPP and its National Volunteers in unison with most sections of Irish society. O'Brien perceived it as an opportunity for all Irishmen, Protestant and Catholic alike to unite and serve together in the long-term interest of attaining independent Irish self-government. The initial recruiting response to enlisting in Irish regiments of the 10th and 16th (Irish) Division was considerable. Ulstermen enlisted in their 36th (Ulster) Division.

By 1915 with stalemate on the Western Front and the losses of the 10th (Irish) Division in the Dardanelles at Cape Helles, enthusiasm began to wane. O'Brien had warned a decade earlier of the resurgence of revolutionary nationalism evolving out of the sectarian basis of national action, subsequently erupting in the 1916 Rebellion. This was to have serious ramifications for Ireland's subsequent history.

Despite his trenchant views up to 1914, on 13 June 1916 the AFIL's main opponent Joe Devlin chaired an AOH Convention in Dublin that approved the proposed partition of Ireland by 475 votes to 265.

O'Brien suffered closure of his newspaper, the Cork Free Press in 1916 soon after the appointment of Lord Decies as Chief Press Censor for Ireland. Decies warned the press to be careful about what they published. Such warnings had little effect when dealing with such papers as the Cork Free Press. It was suppressed after its IRA editor, Frank Gallagher, accused the authorities of lying about the conditions and situation of IRA prisoners in Frongoch internment camp.

== Convention boycott ==
Following the Easter Rising the Government's attempt in July 1916 to have Redmond and Carson agree on immediately introducing Home Rule, failed. The new Prime Minister Lloyd George proposed in May 1917, in what was a fifth attempt to implement Home Rule, that an Irish Convention, composed of representative Irishmen from all parties, should assemble to deliberate upon the best means of governing their country.

The AFIL Party was asked to nominate representatives to the convention. In reply O'Brien stated four essential conditions which first needed to be fulfilled if the convention was to succeed. He submitted a panel to the Cabinet limited to twelve leading representatives of the main bodies and parties involved. It was subsequently clear that such a prominent representation would not have separated without coming to agreement, but O'Brien's proposals were set aside. None of those he proposed were invited. Instead the ninety-five who agreed to attend in July were composed of nine-tenths representatives drawn from already elected representatives who had previously voted for the Home Rule settlement.

Lloyd George appealed to O'Brien to attend, but under the circumstances both he and Healy declined, despite the fact that for thirteen years he had been calling for a conference of all parties to settle the Irish question. O'Brien believed that the conclave would make "a hateful bargain for the partition of the country under a plausible disguise". What was needed instead was not a "heterogeneous assembly ... but a small round-table of representative Irishmen". As early as 18 May Sinn Féin declined to send representatives, the Dublin Trades Council, the Cork Trade and Labour Council, the Gaelic and National Leagues also refused.

The only constructive contribution which the Ulster delegates made to the Irish Convention was to propose in March 1918, the partition of Ireland with the exclusion of all of the province of Ulster.

== Handing over ==
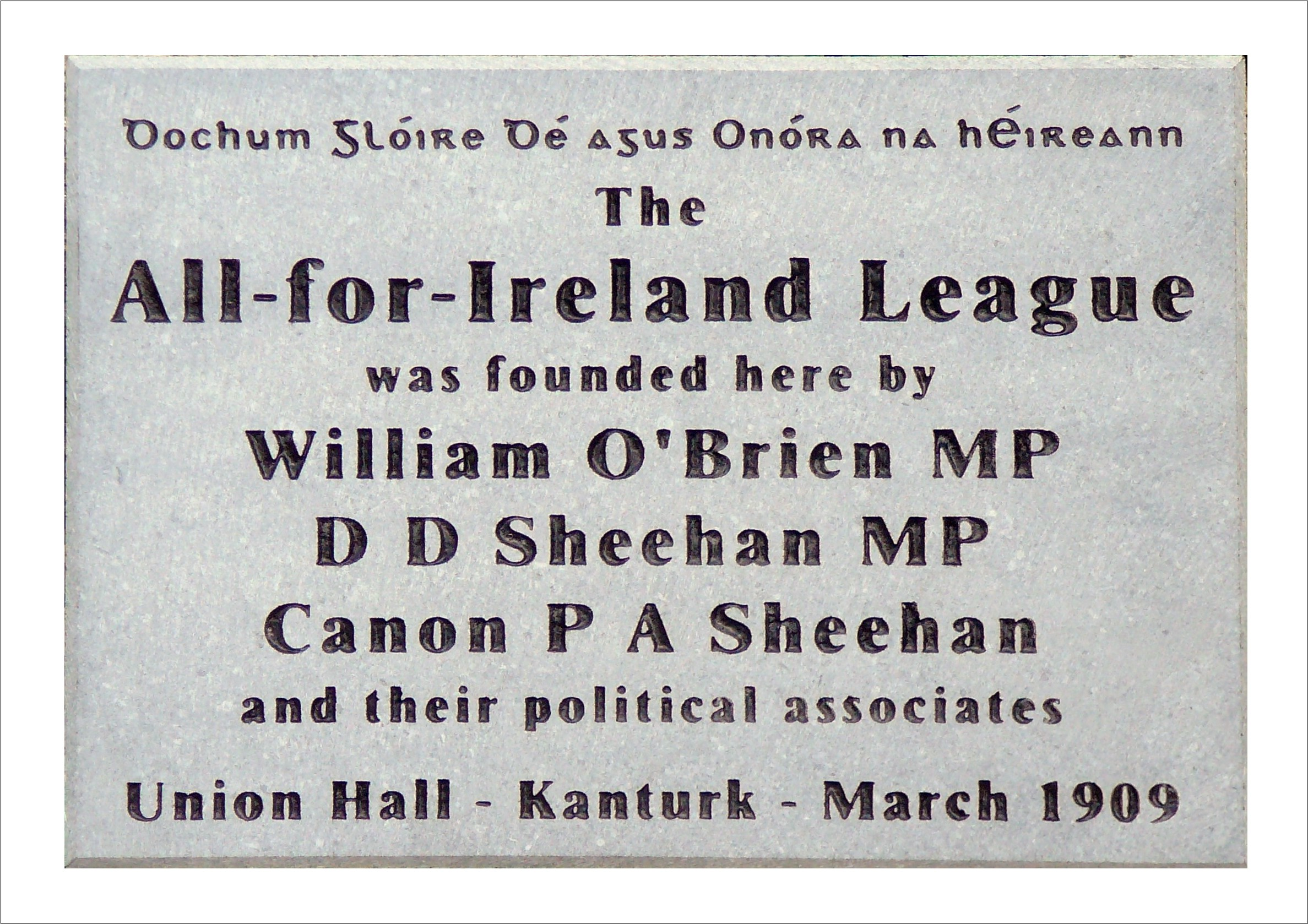
Kanturk Union Hall 1909 plaque commemorating the founding of the AFIL

A final contest between the old parliamentary rivals ensued on the death of AFIL party chairman James Gilhooly in October 1916. The West-Cork by-election has a place in history as the first after the Rising and the last in which the Irish Party narrowly captured a seat and as the self-induced demise of the AFIL. At stake in the bitterly fought by-election was not just one of the 105 seats in the House of Commons, the great issue was William O'Brien's AFIL versus John Redmond's Irish Party. In November three candidates were nominated, the third also a local AFIL supporter who stood in protest after O'Brien passed him over in favour of Frank Healy, a Sinn Féin close candidate who had been imprisoned in Frongoch, thereby splitting the AFIL vote to the detriment of O'Brien's party. (At that time seats were won by "candidates first past the post", or uncontested as in 1918 by Séan Hayes of Sinn Féin).

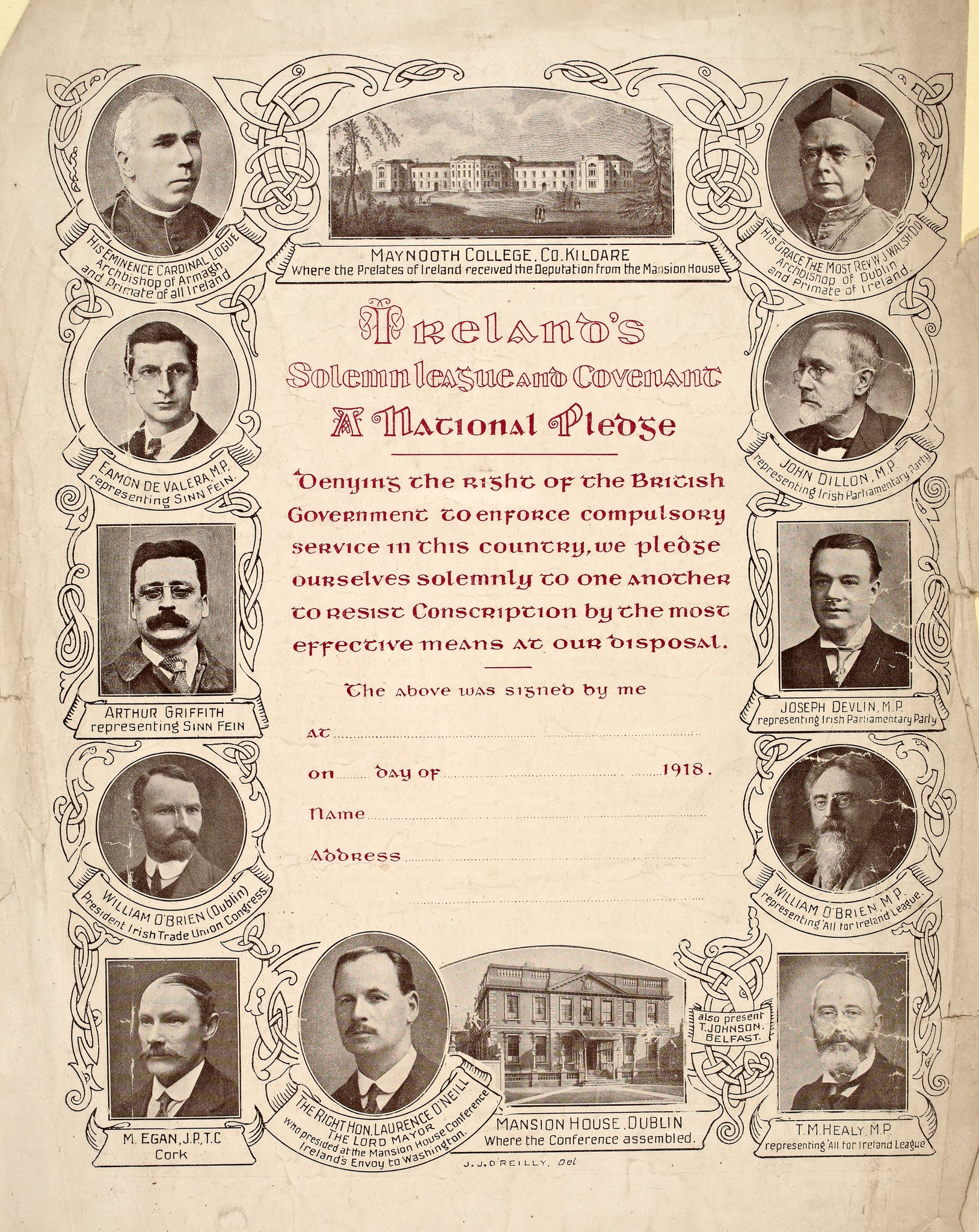
Ireland's Anti-Conscription Pledge, 1918

When Britain moved to introduce Home Rule in April 1918 as proposed by the Irish Convention, it unwisely did so when it linked its implementation with a conscription bill for Ireland after the collapse of the Allied, and Irish, divisions during the German spring offensive on the Western Front. This resulted in the "Irish conscription crisis". At its height the AFIL withdrew from Westminster while making a final damning anti-conscription speech, joining forces with the Irish Party, Sinn Féin and Labour in mass protest demonstrations in Dublin. Although the act was never put into force its crisis caused an unprecedented rise in popularity for Sinn Féin, destroying all interest in Home Rule and constitutional nationalism.

Towards the end of 1918, as a consequence that both the Irish Party and Britain failed to introduce Home Rule and maintain an undivided Ireland, and as it became evident that constitutional political concepts for attaining independent All-Ireland self-government were being displaced by a path of militant physical-force, the AFIL MPs recognised the futility of contesting the 1918 general election—O'Brien in an address to the election:

We cannot subscribe to a programme of armed resistance in the field, or even of permanent withdrawal from Westminster; but to the spirit of Sinn Féin, as distinct from its abstract programme, the great mass of independent single-minded Irishmen have been won over, and accordingly they ought now to have a full and sympathetic trial for enforcing the Irish nation's right of self-determination.

The party members issued a manifesto supporting the moderate Sinn Féin movement, and unanimously decided to retire from the election putting its seats at the disposal of its candidates, all of whom were returned unopposed as Sinn Féin representatives.

== Conclusion ==
The dual policy of the League aimed at attaining All-Ireland self-government, initially as Home Rule within the United Kingdom, then as a Dominion. It maintained that there could neither be any form of coercion of Unionist Ulster nor any question of partitioning Ireland. Instead it proposed achieving this by cultivating rapprochement between moderate Catholic and Protestant Irishmen through conference and conciliation as opposed to conflict. It also demanded guarantees for unlimited safeguards to protect the minority Protestant community. Its primal aspiration was to have the people on this island come to realise that it is possible for Irish of different persuasions to live together in mutual toleration.

It failed in these aims because most Nationalists underestimated the intensity of Unionist resistance to Home Rule and particularly due to the strong distrust influential Catholic clergy had towards the League. In all but two cases, the clergy acted substantially united behind Irish Party candidates, so that in the twenty-three constituencies AFIL candidates contested in the December 1910 election, the Church's forces were thoroughly mobilised against O'Brien's League, contributing to the subsequent polarisation of the political landscape.

From 1915 members of the League were defecting to Sinn Féin, the editorial of O'Brien's Cork Free Press stating in the issue of 30 September "It is to Sinn Féin that Ireland must now look to mould the future of her people". O'Brien was convinced that the only dignified course was to stand aside and let Sinn Féin exert pressure on England to come to terms. The party did not contest the December 1918 election.

Despite this, the AFIL continues to historically exert a certain fascination, undoubtedly due to the many strands encompassed underneath its umbrella. It was both an urban working-class and an agrarian-based movement, focused on reforming the political landscape in Ireland. O'Brien's oft quoted policy of 'the three Cs' is too readily dismissed by historians eager to hasten from the turbulent 1910 elections to events beyond the Home Rule crisis of 1912–14. Missing in so doing, to acknowledge the AFIL's mere existence, its actions and more importantly its rhetoric. The criticisms, arguments and the many plans it put forward for alternative Home Rule call for more thorough examination. A scrutiny of the social background and outlook of those nationalists and unionists who supported the AFIL during a vibrant period of modern Irish history could provide further insight into their cohesive interests, sympathies and traditions. The AFIL's claim to be heard in this regard deserves further study.

== League's Anthem ==
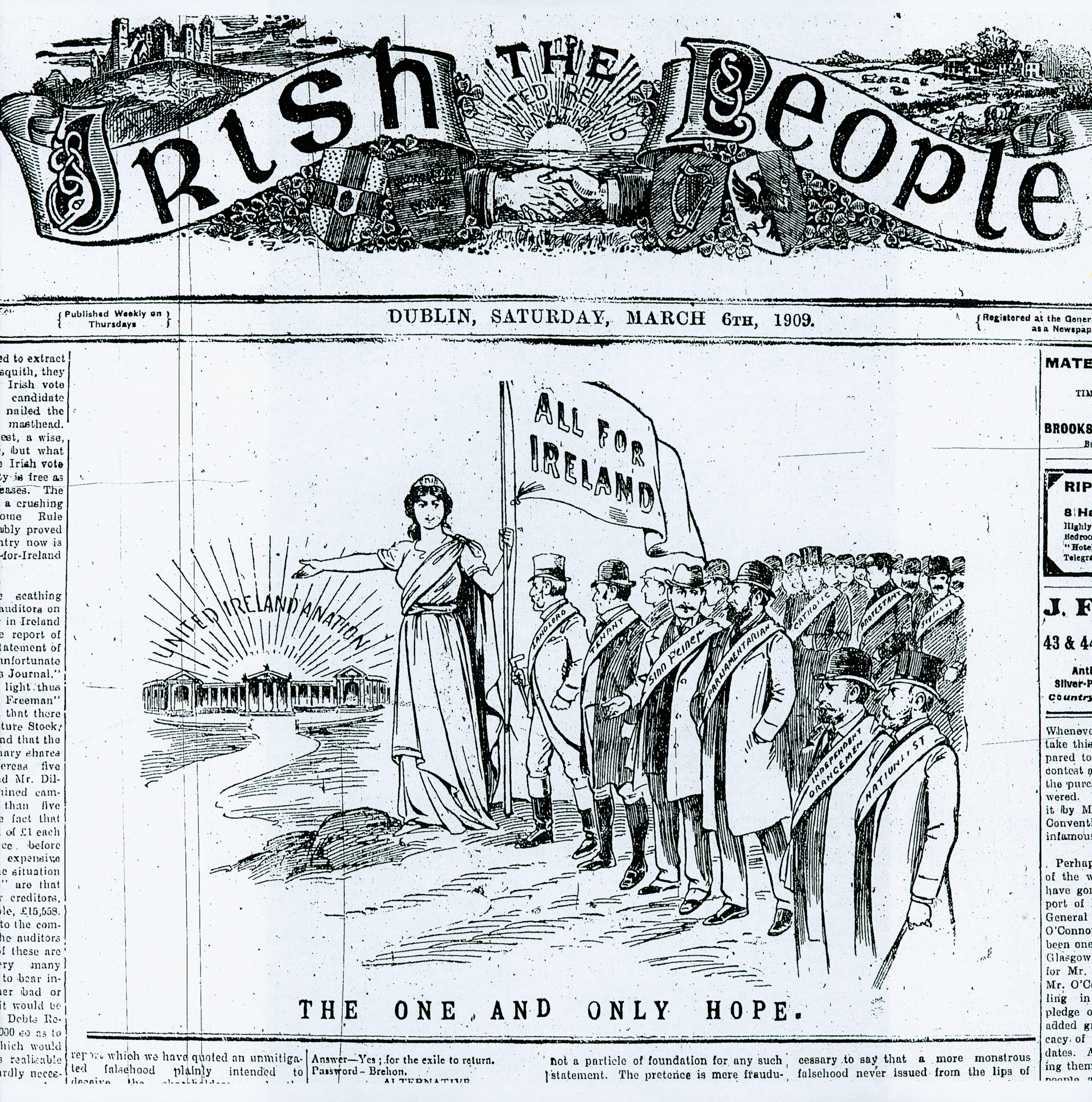
"The Irish People" March 1909 and O'Brien's vision: United Ireland a Nation – The One, and Only Hope! (sashes l-r): Landlord, Tenant, Sinn Féiner, Parliamentarian, Catholic, Protestant, Independent Orangemen, Nationalist ...

ALL–FOR–IRELAND

All for Ireland ! One and all !
Here we meet at Erin's call –
Meet, to pledge with heart and hand,
True fealty to our native land.

Many-minded though we be,
In this pact we all agree –
We must end the reign of wrong
That's wrecked our country's life so long.

Hostile sections in the past,
We shall now be friends at last:
All our classes, clans and creeds
Rivals but in patriot deeds.

Here we come at Erin's call,
From cottage home, and stately hall,
For her rights to stand or fall –
ALL FOR IRELAND ! ONE AND ALL !
T.D.S.

== See also ==
- Irish issue in British politics
