= William Sears (politician) =

Irish politician (1868–1929)

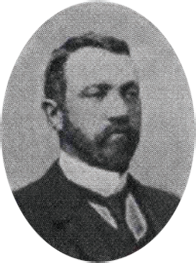
- Sears, c. 1910s

Senator
- In office 6 December 1928 – 23 March 1929

Teachta Dála
- In office August 1923 – June 1927
- Constituency: Mayo South
- In office May 1921 – August 1923
- Constituency: Mayo South–Roscommon South
- In office December 1918 – May 1921
- Constituency: Mayo South

Personal details
- Born: 1868 Neale, County Mayo, Ireland
- Died: 23 March 1929 (aged 60–61) Dublin, Ireland
- Party: Sinn Féin; Cumann na nGaedheal

William Frederick Sears (1868 – 23 March 1929) was an Irish Sinn Féin and later Cumann na nGaedheal politician.

Sears was born in Neale, County Mayo in 1868. He was elected as a Sinn Féin MP for the Mayo South constituency at the 1918 general election. In January 1919, Sinn Féin MPs refused to recognise the Parliament of the United Kingdom and instead assembled at the Mansion House in Dublin as a revolutionary parliament called Dáil Éireann, though Sears did not attend as he was in prison. He was elected unopposed as a Sinn Féin Teachta Dála (TD) for the Mayo South–Roscommon South constituency at the 1921 elections.

He supported the Anglo-Irish Treaty and voted for it. He was re-elected unopposed for the same constituency at the 1922 general election, this time as a pro-Treaty Sinn Féin TD. He was elected as a Cumann na nGaedheal TD for Mayo South constituency at the 1923 general election. He lost his seat at the June 1927 general election but was elected to the Seanad in 1928. He died in office in 1929 and the by-election for his seat was won by Sir Nugent Everard.

In 1902 he founded the Enniscorthy Echo in co-operation with Sir Thomas Esmonde.

Parliament of the United Kingdom
Preceded by John Fitzgibbon	Member of Parliament for Mayo South; 1918–1922	Constituency abolished
Oireachtas
New constituency	Teachta Dála for Mayo South; 1918–1921	Constituency abolished

Dáil	Election	Deputy (Party)	Deputy (Party)	Deputy (Party)	Deputy (Party)
2nd	1921	Harry Boland (SF)	Tom Maguire (SF)	Daniel O'Rourke (SF)	William Sears (SF)
3rd	1922	Harry Boland (AT-SF)	Tom Maguire (AT-SF)	Daniel O'Rourke (PT-SF)	William Sears (PT-SF)
4th	1923	Constituency abolished. See Roscommon and Mayo South			

Dáil	Election	Deputy (Party)	Deputy (Party)	Deputy (Party)	Deputy (Party)	Deputy (Party)
4th	1923	Tom Maguire (Rep)	Michael Kilroy (Rep)	William Sears (CnaG)	Joseph MacBride (CnaG)	Martin Nally (CnaG)
5th	1927 (Jun)	Thomas J. O'Connell (Lab)	Michael Kilroy (FF)	Eugene Mullen (FF)	James FitzGerald-Kenney (CnaG)	Martin Nally (CnaG)
6th	1927 (Sep)	Thomas J. O'Connell (Lab)	Michael Kilroy (FF)	Richard Walsh (FF)	James FitzGerald-Kenney (CnaG)	Martin Nally (CnaG)
7th	1932	Edward Moane (FF)	Michael Kilroy (FF)	Richard Walsh (FF)	James FitzGerald-Kenney (CnaG)	Martin Nally (CnaG)
8th	1933	Edward Moane (FF)	Michael Kilroy (FF)	Richard Walsh (FF)	James FitzGerald-Kenney (CnaG)	Martin Nally (CnaG)
9th	1937	Edward Moane (FF)	Micheál Clery (FF)	Richard Walsh (FF)	James FitzGerald-Kenney (FG)	Martin Nally (FG)
10th	1938	Mícheál Ó Móráin (FF)	Micheál Clery (FF)	Richard Walsh (FF)	James FitzGerald-Kenney (FG)	Martin Nally (FG)
11th	1943	Mícheál Ó Móráin (FF)	Micheál Clery (FF)	Joseph Blowick (CnaT)	James FitzGerald-Kenney (FG)	Dominick Cafferky (CnaT)
12th	1944	Mícheál Ó Móráin (FF)	Micheál Clery (FF)	Joseph Blowick (CnaT)	Richard Walsh (FF)	Dominick Cafferky (CnaT)
12th	1945 by-election	Mícheál Ó Móráin (FF)	Bernard Commons (CnaT)	Joseph Blowick (CnaT)	Richard Walsh (FF)	Dominick Cafferky (CnaT)
13th	1948	Mícheál Ó Móráin (FF)	Bernard Commons (CnaT)	Joseph Blowick (CnaT)	Richard Walsh (FF)	4 seats 1948–1969
14th	1951	Mícheál Ó Móráin (FF)	Seán Flanagan (FF)	Joseph Blowick (CnaT)	Dominick Cafferky (CnaT)	4 seats 1948–1969
15th	1954	Mícheál Ó Móráin (FF)	Seán Flanagan (FF)	Joseph Blowick (CnaT)	Henry Kenny (FG)	4 seats 1948–1969
16th	1957	Mícheál Ó Móráin (FF)	Seán Flanagan (FF)	Joseph Blowick (CnaT)	Henry Kenny (FG)	4 seats 1948–1969
17th	1961	Mícheál Ó Móráin (FF)	Seán Flanagan (FF)	Joseph Blowick (CnaT)	Henry Kenny (FG)	4 seats 1948–1969
18th	1965	Mícheál Ó Móráin (FF)	Seán Flanagan (FF)	Michael Lyons (FG)	Henry Kenny (FG)	4 seats 1948–1969
19th	1969	Constituency abolished. See Mayo East and Mayo West				
