= James Gilhooly =

Irish politician

Member of Parliament for West Cork
- In office 1885–1916
- Preceded by: Constituency created
- Succeeded by: Daniel O'Leary

Personal details
- Born: 1847 Bantry, County Cork, Ireland
- Died: 16 October 1916 (aged 68–69) Madame Goulding's Private Hospital, Cork, Ireland
- Resting place: Abbey Cemetery, Bantry
- Party: All-for-Ireland League (1910-1916)
- Other political affiliations: Irish Parliamentary Party (until 1891; 1900-1910); Irish National Federation (1891-1900); United Irish League; Irish National League

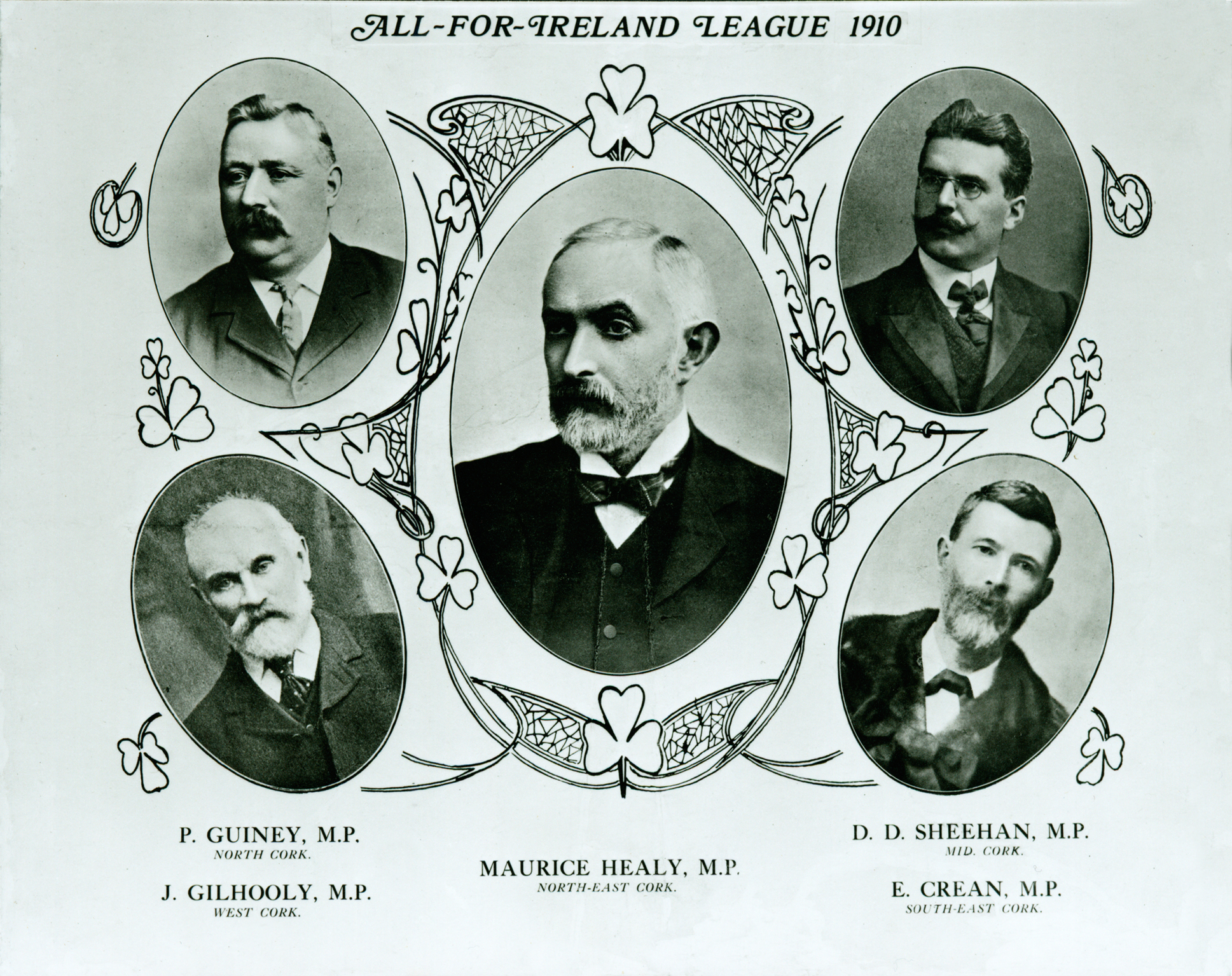
All-for-Ireland League group portrait of five of its Independent Members of Parliament, in the "Cork Free Press" July 30th 1910. These are: Patrick Guiney (North Cork), James Gilhooly (West Cork), Maurice Healy (North East Cork), D. D. Sheehan (Mid Cork), and Eugene Crean (South East Cork).

James Gilhooly (1847–1916) was an Irish nationalist politician and MP in the House of Commons of the United Kingdom of Great Britain and Ireland as member of the Irish Parliamentary Party, from 1910 the All-for Ireland Party, who represented the West Cork constituency from 1885 for 30 years until his death, retaining his seat in eight elections (four of them contested).

Educated privately, he was the son of a Coast Guard officer. As a draper and storekeeper by trade, he established an extensive grocery business in Bantry. He married Mary Collins in 1882.

In 1867, the authorities believed him to be a Fenian "Head Centre" in the Bantry area. During the Land League's Land War and the later Plan of Campaign in the late 1880s he was imprisoned several times under the Coercion Act, which permitted imprisonment without trial, and served a three-month sentence for his role in the No Rent Manifesto of 1881.

He was first elected to parliament in the 1885 general election as a member of the Irish Parliamentary Party (IPP).

As chair person of the local branch of the United Irish League he was some-time president of the local Irish National League. Involved in local politics, he served as Chairman of the Bantry town commissioners and at various times chairman of the Bantry Rural District Council and was a member of the Cork County Council as an ex officio member of the Bantry RDC from its establishment in 1899.

After the "Split" in the IPP over Parnell's leadership he joined the anti-Parnellite Irish National Federation majority group, then joined the re-united Irish Party again in 1900, for which he was elected in the 1900 general election. He was however one of William O'Brien's closest political supporters, joining his secession from the IPP in 1903, then elected in 1910 general election as a member of O'Briens's All-for-Ireland Party (AFIL), of which he was Chairman.

He died on 16 October 1916 at Madame Goulding's Private Hospital, Patrick's Place, Cork and was buried at Abbey Cemetery, Bantry, the town closing down for his funeral and many houses showed black crepe.

The ensuing bitter West-Cork by-election has a place in history as the first after the Rising and the last in which the Irish Party narrowly captured a seat and as the self-induced demise of the AFIL. At stake in the bitterly fought by-election was not just one of the 103 seats in the House of Commons. The great issue was William O’Brien's AFIL versus John Redmond's IPP. In November three candidates were nominated, the third also a local AFIL supporter and member who stood in protest after O’Brien had passed him over in favour of a Sinn Féin close candidate (Frank Healy), thereby splitting the AFIL vote to the detriment of O’Brien's party. (At that time seats were won by "candidates first past the post", or uncontested as in 1918 by Michael Collins of Sinn Féin)

== Sources ==
- Who's Who in British Members of Parliament 1886-1918, Michael Stenton and Stephen Lees, p. 136
- Who Was Who 1916–1928, Adam and Charles Black, London (1929), p. 407
- Who's Who in The long gestation, Patrick Maume (1999), p. 229
- A Biographical Dictionary of Cork, Tim Cadogan & Jeremiah Falvey (2006)

Parliament of the United Kingdom
New constituency	Member of Parliament for West Cork; 1885 – 1916	Succeeded by Daniel O'Leary
