= South Mayo (UK Parliament constituency) =

Former parliamentary constituency in the United Kingdom

- Former county constituency for the House of Commons

1885–1922
- Seats: 1
- Created from: County Mayo
- Replaced by: Mayo South–Roscommon South

South Mayo was a parliamentary constituency in Ireland, which returned one Member of Parliament (MP) to the House of Commons of the Parliament of the United Kingdom, elected on a system of first-past-the-post, from 1885 to 1922.

Prior to the 1885 general election the area was part of the two-seat County Mayo constituency. From 1922, on the establishment of the Irish Free State, it was not represented in the UK Parliament.

== Boundaries ==
This constituency comprised the southern part of County Mayo. In 1918, the constituency expanded to take in the district electoral divisions of Ballinchalla and Owenbrin from County Galway which had been transferred into County Mayo under the 1898 Local Government Act.

1885–1918: The baronies of Clanmorris and Kilmaine, that part of the barony of Costello contained within the parishes of Aghamore, Annagh, Bekan and Knock, and that part of the barony of Carra contained within the parish of Ballyovey.

1918–1922: The existing South Mayo constituency together with that part of the Galway Connemara constituency contained in the administrative county of Mayo.

== Members of Parliament ==
Years	Member	Party
1885–1890	J. F. X. O'Brien	Irish Parliamentary Party
1891–1895	J. F. X. O'Brien	Irish National Federation
1895–1900	Michael Davitt	Irish National Federation
1900 – January 1910	John O'Donnell	Irish Parliamentary Party
January–December 1910	John O'Donnell	All-for-Ireland League
1910–1918	John Fitzgibbon	Irish Parliamentary Party
1918–1922	William Sears	Sinn Féin

== Elections ==
=== Elections in the 1880s ===
General election 27 November 1885: South Mayo
Party	Candidate	Votes	%	±%
Irish Parliamentary	J. F. X. O'Brien	4,953	98.5	
Irish Conservative	George Orme Malley	75	1.5	
Majority		4,878	97.0	
Turnout		5,028	63.0	
Registered electors		7,980		
Irish Parliamentary win (new seat)				

General election 6 July 1886: South Mayo
Party	Candidate	Votes	%	±%
Irish Parliamentary	J. F. X. O'Brien	Unopposed		
Registered electors		7,980		
Irish Parliamentary hold				

=== Elections in the 1890s ===
General election 13 July 1892: South Mayo
Party	Candidate	Votes	%	±%
Irish National Federation	J. F. X. O'Brien	Unopposed		
Registered electors		9,723		
Irish National Federation gain from Irish Parliamentary				

General election 19 July 1895: South Mayo
Party	Candidate	Votes	%	±%
Irish National Federation	Michael Davitt	Unopposed		
Registered electors		10,033		
Irish National Federation hold				

=== Elections in the 1900s ===
South Mayo by-election 28 February 1900
Party	Candidate	Votes	%	±%
Irish Parliamentary	John O'Donnell	2,401	84.9	N/A
Ind. Nationalist	John MacBride	427	15.1	New
Majority		1,974	69.8	N/A
Turnout		2,828	31.2	N/A
Registered electors		9,055		
Irish Parliamentary hold		Swing	N/A	

General election 3 October 1900: South Mayo
Party	Candidate	Votes	%	±%
Irish Parliamentary	John O'Donnell	Unopposed		
Registered electors		9,055		
Irish Parliamentary hold				

General election 3 October 1906: South Mayo
Party	Candidate	Votes	%	±%
Irish Parliamentary	John O'Donnell	Unopposed		
Registered electors		8,110		
Irish Parliamentary hold				

=== Elections in the 1910s ===
January 1910 general election: South Mayo
Party	Candidate	Votes	%	±%
All-for-Ireland	John O'Donnell	2,667	54.5	N/A
Irish Parliamentary	Conor O'Kelly	2,226	45.5	N/A
Majority		441	9.0	N/A
Turnout		4,893	62.1	N/A
Registered electors		7,883		
All-for-Ireland gain from Irish Parliamentary		Swing	N/A	

December 1910 general election: South Mayo
Party	Candidate	Votes	%	±%
Irish Parliamentary	John Fitzgibbon	Unopposed		
Registered electors		7,883		
Irish Parliamentary gain from All-for-Ireland				

1918 general election: South Mayo
Party	Candidate	Votes	%	±%
Sinn Féin	William Sears	Unopposed		
Registered electors		21,567		
Sinn Féin gain from Irish Parliamentary				
