= West Cork (UK Parliament constituency) =

UK parliamentary constituency in Ireland, 1885–1922

- Former county constituency for the House of Commons

1885–1922
- Seats: 1
- Created from: County Cork
- Replaced by: Cork Mid, North, South, South East and West

West Cork, a division of County Cork, was a parliamentary constituency in Ireland, represented in the Parliament of the United Kingdom. From 1885 to 1922 it returned one Member of Parliament (MP) to the House of Commons of the United Kingdom of Great Britain and Ireland.

Until the 1885 general election the area was part of the County Cork constituency. From 1922, on the establishment of the Irish Free State, it was not represented in the Parliament of the United Kingdom.

== Boundaries ==
This constituency comprised the baronies of Bantry, Bear and West Carbery (West Division) and that part of the barony of West Carbery (East Division) consisting of the parishes of Aghadown, Clear Island, Creagh (except the townlands of Gortnaclohy and Smorane), and Tullagh.

== Members of Parliament ==
| Election | Member | Party |
|---|---|---|
| 1885 | James Gilhooly | Irish Parliamentary Party |
| 1891 | James Gilhooly | Irish National Federation |
| 1900 | James Gilhooly | Irish Parliamentary Party |
| 1910 | James Gilhooly | All-for-Ireland League |
| 1916 by-election | Daniel O'Leary | Irish Parliamentary Party |
| 1918 | Seán Hayes | Sinn Féin |
| 1922 | Constituency abolished | |

== Elections ==
=== Elections in the 1880s ===
1885 general election: West Cork
| Party | Candidate | Votes | % | ±% |
|---|---|---|---|---|
| Irish Parliamentary | James Gilhooly | 3,920 | 91.3 | |
| Irish Conservative | John Warren Payne | 373 | 8.7 | |
| Majority | | 3,547 | 82.6 | |
| Turnout | | 4,293 | 70.1 | |
| Registered electors | | 6,124 | | |
| Irish Parliamentary win (new seat) | | | | |

1886 general election: West Cork
| Party | Candidate | Votes | % | ±% |
|---|---|---|---|---|
| Irish Parliamentary | James Gilhooly | Unopposed | | |
| Irish Parliamentary hold | | | | |

=== Elections in the 1890s ===
1892 general election: West Cork
| Party | Candidate | Votes | % | ±% |
|---|---|---|---|---|
| Irish National Federation | James Gilhooly | 3,155 | 90.6 | N/A |
| Irish Unionist | Somers Payne | 329 | 9.4 | New |
| Majority | | 2,826 | 81.2 | N/A |
| Turnout | | 3,484 | 59.5 | N/A |
| Registered electors | | 5,854 | | |
| Irish National Federation gain from Irish Parliamentary | | Swing | N/A | |

1895 general election: West Cork
| Party | Candidate | Votes | % | ±% |
|---|---|---|---|---|
| Irish National Federation | James Gilhooly | Unopposed | | |
| Irish National Federation hold | | | | |

=== Elections in the 1900s ===
1900 general election: West Cork
| Party | Candidate | Votes | % | ±% |
|---|---|---|---|---|
| Irish Parliamentary | James Gilhooly | Unopposed | | |
| Irish Parliamentary hold | | | | |

1906 general election: West Cork
| Party | Candidate | Votes | % | ±% |
|---|---|---|---|---|
| Irish Parliamentary | James Gilhooly | Unopposed | | |
| Irish Parliamentary hold | | | | |

=== Elections in the 1910s ===
January 1910 general election: West Cork
| Party | Candidate | Votes | % | ±% |
|---|---|---|---|---|
| All-for-Ireland | James Gilhooly | 2,155 | 60.9 | N/A |
| Irish Parliamentary | Daniel O'Leary | 1,382 | 39.1 | N/A |
| Majority | | 773 | 21.8 | N/A |
| Turnout | | 3,537 | 61.8 | N/A |
| Registered electors | | 5,727 | | |
| All-for-Ireland gain from Irish Parliamentary | | Swing | N/A | |

December 1910 general election: West Cork
| Party | Candidate | Votes | % | ±% |
|---|---|---|---|---|
| All-for-Ireland | James Gilhooly | 2,218 | 53.1 | −7.8 |
| Irish Parliamentary | Daniel O'Leary | 1,959 | 46.9 | +7.8 |
| Majority | | 259 | 6.2 | −15.6 |
| Turnout | | 4,177 | 72.9 | +11.1 |
| Registered electors | | 5,727 | | |
| All-for-Ireland hold | | Swing | −7.8 | |

1916 by-election: West Cork
| Party | Candidate | Votes | % | ±% |
|---|---|---|---|---|
| Irish Parliamentary | Daniel O'Leary (Note: O'Leary had pledged to join the Irish Parliamentary Party and was a supporter of John Redmond. However, the United Irish League had withheld approval of his candidacy.) | 1,866 | 46.8 | −0.1 |
| All-for-Ireland | Frank Healy (Note: Healy was imprisoned in Frongoch internment camp for supposedly being associated with Sinn Féin, but Sinn Féin repudiated his candidacy for not revoking to take his seat at Westminster, instead he had been supported by William O'Brien, who was leader of the All-for-Ireland League.) | 1,750 | 43.9 | −9.2 |
| Independent All-for-Ireland League | Michael Birchmans Slipsey (Note: Slipsey was a local member of the All-for-Ireland League who stood in protest against William O'Brien's adoption of an unofficial candidate.) | 370 | 9.3 | N/A |
| Majority | | 116 | 2.9 | N/A |
| Turnout | | 3,986 | 71.4 | −1.5 |
| Registered electors | | 5,582 | | |
| Irish Parliamentary gain from All-for-Ireland | | Swing | +4.6 | |

Notes

The 1916 by-election, which contrasted so obviously with Gilhooly's long tenure of the seat, was viewed as a farce by Unionist opinion.

1918 general election: West Cork
| Party | Candidate | Votes | % | ±% |
|---|---|---|---|---|
| Sinn Féin | Séan Hayes | Unopposed | | |
| Sinn Féin gain from All-for-Ireland | | | | |

== Sources ==
- Tony Williams, House of Commons Information Office
- Walker, Brian M., ed. (1978). Parliamentary Election Results in Ireland, 1801–1922. Royal Irish Academy.
- Michael Stenton and Stephen Lees, Who's Who in British Members of Parliament 1919-1945 p. 156 (Hayes)
- Michael Stenton and Stephen Lees, Who's Who in British Members of Parliament 1886-1918 p. 136 (Gilhooley), p. 273 (O'Leary)
- Leigh Rayment's Historical List of MPs – Constituencies beginning with "C" (part 5)
