= James Gordon =

James or Jim Gordon may refer to:

== Arts and entertainment ==
- James Gordon (actor) (1871–1941), American actor
- Jim Gordon (sportscaster) (1927–2003), American sportscaster
- James Alexander Gordon (1936–2014), British radio presenter
- Jim Gordon (musician) (1945–2023), American rock drummer
- James Gordon (Canadian musician) (born 1955), Canadian singer-songwriter
- Jim Gordon (bassist), bassist on Sordid Humor
- Jim Gordon (jazz musician), on Home Plate
- James Gordon (poet) (1874-1949), Australian poet

== Military ==
- James Gordon, 2nd Viscount Aboyne (1620–1649), Scottish royalist commander in the Wars of the Three Kingdoms
- James Willoughby Gordon (1772–1851), British Army general and long-serving Quartermaster-General to the Forces
- James Gordon (Royal Navy officer) (1782–1869), British admiral
- James Gordon (British Army officer, died 1783), British Army officer who fought in the American War of Independence
- James B. Gordon (1822–1864), Confederate general
- James Gordon (Australian soldier) (1909–1986), awarded the Victoria Cross in 1941
- James Gordon (British Army officer, born 1957), British Army general

== Politics and law ==
- James Gordon (New York politician) (1739–1810), American Indian trader, US Congressman
- James Gordon Sr. (1750–1796), American politician
- James Gordon (MP) (c. 1758–1822), member of Parliament for Stockbridge, Truro, Clitheroe and Tregony
- James Gordon (Upper Canada politician) (1786–1865), Upper Canada political figure
- James Wright Gordon (J. Wright Gordon, 1809–1853), Whig politician from Michigan
- James Lindsay Gordon (1813–1877) attorney and member of the Virginia House of Delegates
- James Gordon (Mississippi politician) (1833–1912), American planter, US Senator
- James Gordon (Australian politician) (1845–1914), New South Wales politician
- James Lindsay Gordon (attorney) (1858–1904), American attorney and Virginia state senator, nephew of James Lindsay Gordon
- James Thomas Gordon (1859–1919), Canadian politician, Manitoba
- James H. Gordon (1868–1936), American judge, Justice of the Oklahoma Supreme Court
- James L. Gordon (1917–1967), American-Filipino politician
- James Fleming Gordon (1918–1990), U.S. federal judge
- Jim Gordon (politician) (born 1937), Canadian politician
- James Gordon (New Brunswick politician) (born 1949), Canadian politician
- James D. Gordon III (born 1954), American legal academic
- James Gordon (Alabama politician) (born 1964), American politician

== Religion ==
- James Gordon (Jesuit) (1541–1620), Scottish Jesuit
- James Gordon (vicar apostolic) (1665–1746), Vicar Apostolic of Scotland
- James Bentley Gordon (1750–1819), Irish clergyman and historian
- James Frederick Skinner Gordon (1821–1904), Scottish antiquary and Episcopal church minister
- James Gordon (missionary) (1832–1872), Scottish missionary to the New Hebrides
- James Henry Hamilton-Gordon (1845–1868), prospective missionary, son of George Hamilton-Gordon, 5th Earl of Aberdeen
- James Gordon (bishop of Jarrow) (1881–1938), Bishop of Jarrow in the Church of England

== Other people ==
- James Gordon (botanist) (1708–1780), gardener, nurseryman and seed merchant
- James Davidson Gordon (1835–1889), British civil servant and administrator
- James Edward Henry Gordon (1852–1893), British engineer
- James Gordon (sprinter) (1908–1997), American Olympic sprinter
- J. E. Gordon (James Edward Gordon, 1913–1998), British professor of materials science and biomechanics
- James P. Gordon (1928–2013), American physicist and engineer
- James Riely Gordon (1863–1937), American architect
- James Roycroft Gordon (1898-1980), Canadian industrialist and President of Inco Limited
- James Gordon, Baron Gordon of Strathblane (1936–2020), Scottish businessman
- James Gordon (American football) (born 1991), American football player
- James Samuel Gordon, American author and psychiatrist

== Fictional people ==
- Commissioner Gordon, fictional police commissioner of Gotham City in Batman comics
- James Gordon Jr., a supervillain in DC Comics
- James Gordon (Gotham), a fictional character in the Gotham television series, based on the Batman character of the same name

== See also ==
- Jay Gordon (disambiguation)
- Jimmy Gordon (disambiguation)
