= William F. Gordon =

American politician & lawyer (1787–1858)

Member of the U.S. House of Representatives from Virginia
- In office January 25, 1830 – March 3, 1835
- Preceded by: William C. Rives (10th); John J. Roane (12th)
- Succeeded by: Joseph Chinn (10th); James Garland (12th)
- Constituency: 10th district (1830-33); 12th district (1833–35)

Member of the Virginia Senate from Albemarle
- In office December 7, 1829 – January 24, 1830
- Preceded by: Charles Cocke
- Succeeded by: Thomas W. Gilmer

Member of the Virginia House of Delegates from Albemarle County
- In office December 3, 1822 – December 6, 1829 Serving with William C. Rives, Thomas Mann Randolph, Rice W. Wood, Charles Cocke, Hugh Nelson
- Preceded by: Charles Cocke
- Succeeded by: Thomas W. Gilmer
- In office December 7, 1818 – December 2, 1821 Serving with Samuel Carr, Thomas Mann Randolph
- Preceded by: Jesse W. Garth
- Succeeded by: Charles Cocker

Personal details
- Born: William Fitzhugh Gordon; January 13, 1787 Fredericksburg, Virginia, U.S.
- Died: July 21, 1858 (aged 71) Albemarle County, Virginia, U.S.
- Party: Democratic
- Spouse(s): Mary Robinson Rootes; Elizabeth Lindsay
- Children: James Lindsay Gordon
- Relatives: Armistead C. Gordon (grandson)

Military service
- Allegiance: United States
- Branch/service: Virginia Militia
- Rank: Major general
- Battles/wars: War of 1812

William Fitzhugh Gordon (January 13, 1787 – July 21, 1858) was a nineteenth-century lawyer, military officer, politician and planter from the piedmont region of Virginia. He served in the U.S. House of Representatives from 1830 to 1835.

== Early life and education ==
William Fitzhugh Gordon was born at Germanna to Elizabeth Gordon and her husband (and cousin) James Gordon, Jr. (1759-1799). His grandfather John Gordon had emigrated to the Virginia colony in 1738 from County Down in northern Ireland, as did his elder brother James Gordon (1711-1768), and they both became successful tobacco merchants and planters in Virginia's Tidewater region. John Gordon had initially joined his brother's business in Lancaster County, but moved across the Rappahannock River to Urbanna in Middlesex County and married Lucy Churchill, who bore a dozen children, including this man's father, who served in the Virginia House of Delegates alongside his cousin and father-in-law James Gordon Sr. (son of the immigrant James Gordon, and who inherited Verville plantation in Lancaster County). Although the immigrant John Gordon ultimately settled in Richmond County, James Gordon Jr. moved westward to near Germanna in what became Spotsylvania County and then Orange County, where he established a farm and plantation near an iron furnace established at the beginning of the century by former Virginia Governor Alexander Spotswood. In 1787, James Gordon owned 21 enslaved adults and 34 enslaved Africans younger than 16, along with 17 horses, a stud horse, 51 cattle and a 4-wheeled chaise carriage in Orange County. His maternal grandmother was a cousin of Benjamin Harrison, signer of the Declaration of Independence and governor of Virginia. Thus linked to the First Families of Virginia, William Gordon attended private schools appropriate to his class, including Spring Hill Academy. After completing those studies, he read law.

== Career ==
Admitted to the bar in 1808, Gordon began his legal career at Orange Court House. He moved to Charlottesville in Albemarle County in 1809. There he continued his practice and in 1812 won election as the city's commonwealth attorney.

=== Military officer ===
Gordon served in the War of 1812, then continued to serve in the Virginia Militia, in 1829 accepting a commission as brigadier general from then-governor William B. Giles, and becoming major general of the Second Brigade in 1840.

=== Politician ===
Following the war, Albemarle County voters elected Gordon as one of their representatives in the Virginia House of Delegates, and re-elected him annually to that part-time position basically for a decade except for the 1821-1822 session. Thus, Gordon served from 1818 to 1821 alongside first Samuel Carr, then Thomas Mann Randolph until legislators elected him governor, then Charles Everett, and during those sessions helped established the University of Virginia in his district. After the hiatus in which Everett and Charles Cocke represented Albemarle County, Gordon again won re-election several times until 1829, serving first alongside William C. Rives as well as again with Thomas Mann Randolph, then Rice W. Wood, Charles Cocke and Hugh Nelson. In 1829, Gordon won election to the Virginia Senate, where he represented Albemarle County, as well as nearby Amherst, Nelson, Fluvanna and Goochland Counties. Gordon also represented Albemarle, Amherst, Nelson, Fluvanna and Goochland counties in the Virginia Constitutional Convention of 1829-1830 alongside James Pleasants, Lucas P. Thompson and Thomas Massie Jr. He proposed the "mixed basis" compromise ultimately adopted when western representatives complained about the overrepresentation of Tidewater planters in the Virginia General Assembly.

In 1830, Gordon resigned from the Virginia Senate to succeed William Cabell Rives in the United States House of Representatives, and won re-election as a Jacksonian, serving until 1835. He earned the nickname "Sub-Treasury Gordon" for helping to devise the Sub-Treasury Act in 1844, an act that separated the federal government from banks.

Gordon attended the Southern Convention in Nashville, Tennessee in 1850 as a delegate. He served as a Democrat.

=== Planter ===
After failing to win reelection in 1835, Gordon returned to farming and his legal practice. Gordon lived in a planter economy largely dependent upon slavery, and as a landholder, his plantation operated with enslaved labor. He owned 29 slaves in Albemarle County in 1820, 44 slaves in the 1830 federal census. In both the 1840 federal census. and the 1850 federal census, Gordon owned 54 slaves.

== Personal life ==
Gordon married twice. His first wife, Mary Robinson Rootes, daughter of Thomas Reade Rootes of Fredericksburg died without bearing any children who survived. He remarried, to Elizabeth Lindsay, daughter of Col. Reuben Lindsay of Albemarle County, who had fought in the Continental Army during the American Revolutionary War. They had eight sons (six of whom became soldiers in the Confederate Army) and three daughters who reached maturity.

- James Lindsay Gordon (1813-1877) became an attorney and served many years as the Commonwealth attorney for Louisa County
- Twin brothers George Loyall Gordon (1829-1862) and Charles Henry Gordon (1829-1897) also became Confederate officers, with George Loyall Gordon dying at the Battle of Malvern Hill
- Reuben Lindsay Gordon (1820–1887) also became a lawyer and planter, as well as served one term representing Orange County in the Virginia House of Delegates
- Dr. John Churchill Gordon (1831–1919)
- Dr. Alexander Tazewell Gordon (1833–1903)
- Sgt. Mason Gordon (1840–1914) likewise survived the conflict
- Maria Lindsay Gordon (1815-1848), never married but took care of family members before dying of typhoid fever
- Hannah Elizabeth Gordon Robertson (1817-1861) married William Robertson and bore nine children before her death.

== Death and legacy ==
Gordon died at his Edgeworth plantation in Albemarle County, Virginia on July 21, 1858. He was interred at the family cemetery in Springfield, Virginia. His eldest son James Lindsay Gordon (1813-1877) became a lawyer and served two terms in the Virginia House of Delegates, but did not have any children. His brother George Loyall Gordon (1829-1862) followed a similar career path as a lawyer in Alexandria and Charlottesville but became a newspaper editor instead of a politician and married the eldest daughter of North Carolina judge Joseph J. Daniel. As the Civil War started, he joined the 15th North Carolina regiment (Edgecombe Guards) and died at the Battle of Malvern Hill. His son Armistead C. Gordon (W.F. Gordon's grandson), born at his grandfather's Edgeworth plantation and raised at Longwood plantation in North Carolina, became a lawyer and writer as well as mayor of Staunton, Virginia, and his brother James L. Gordon (1858-1904) also became lawyer, then followed his grandfather's and uncle's path into the Virginia state senate before moving to New York where he became an assistant district attorney and noted for his oratory.

U.S. House of Representatives
Preceded by William C. Rives	Member of the U.S. House of Representatives from Virginia's 10th congressional district January 25, 1830 – March 3, 1833	Succeeded by Joseph Chinn
Preceded by John J. Roane	Member of the U.S. House of Representatives from Virginia's 12th congressional district March 4, 1833 – March 3, 1835 (obsolete district)	Succeeded by James Garland
