= Jimmy Gordon =

Jimmy Gordon may refer to:

- Jimmy Gordon (Australian rules footballer) (1896–1918), Australian rules footballer for Essendon
- Jimmy Gordon (footballer, born 1886) (1886–1959), English football player (West Ham, Grimsby Town)
- Jimmy Gordon (footballer, born 1888) (1888–1954), Scottish football player (Rangers, Scotland)
- Jimmy Gordon (footballer, born 1915) (1915–1996), Scottish football player (Newcastle, Middlesbrough) and coach (Derby, Leeds, Nottingham Forest)
- Jimmy Gordon (politician), American politician serving in the Minnesota House of Representatives since 2024

== See also ==
- James Gordon (disambiguation)
