= Armistead C. Gordon =

American lawyer and writer

Armistead Churchill Gordon
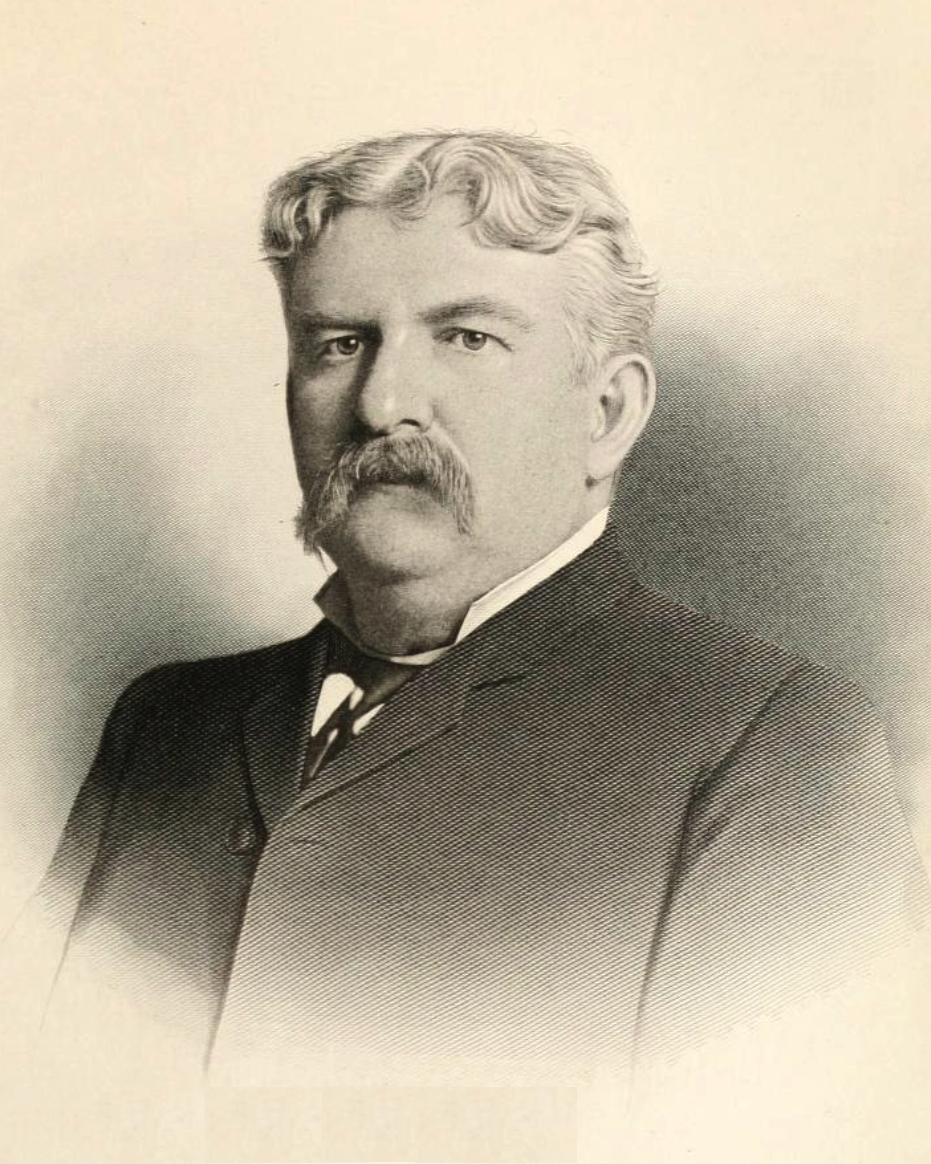
- Armistead in 1906 publication
- Born: December 20, 1855; Albemarle County, Virginia, U.S.
- Died: October 21, 1931 (aged 75); Staunton, Virginia, U.S.
- Education: University of Virginia; University of Virginia School of Law
- Spouse: Marie Breckinridge Catlett (m. 1883; died 1930)
- Children: 5
- Relatives: James Lindsay Gordon (brother); William F. Gordon (grandfather)

Armistead Churchill Gordon (December 20, 1855 – October 21, 1931) was a Virginia lawyer and a prolific writer of prose and poetry. He served as mayor of Staunton, Virginia.

== Early life ==
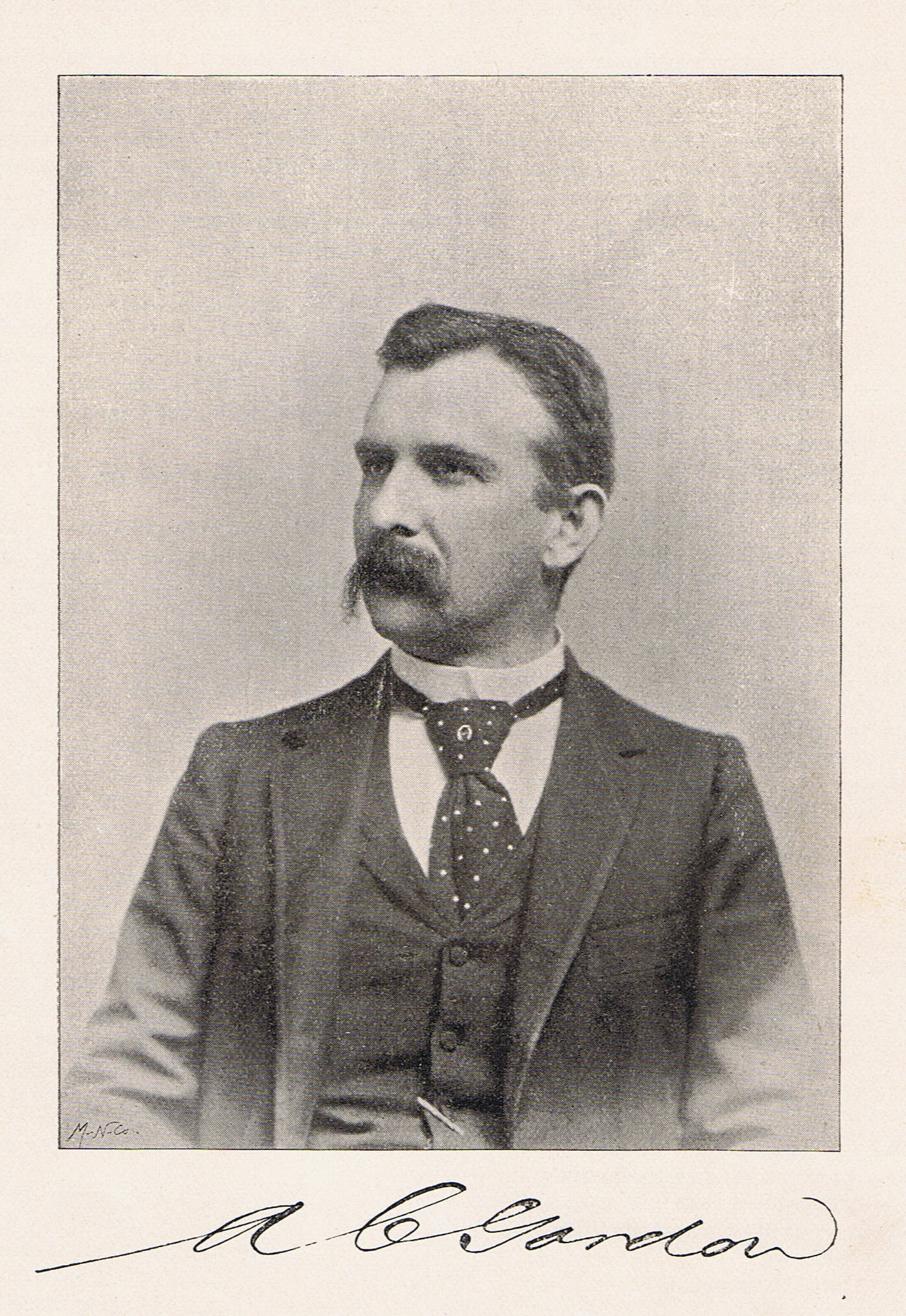
Portrait and signature from an 1892 periodical

Gordon was born on December 20, 1855, at his grandfather's Edgeworth plantation in Albemarle County, Virginia to George Loyall and Mary Long (Daniel) Gordon. His father had graduated from the University of Virginia and practiced law as well as edited the Alexandria Sentinel before his marriage, and would die fighting for the Confederacy with the 15th North Carolina (Edgecompe Guards) at the Battle of Malvern Hill in 1862. His grandfather, Congressman William F. Gordon, operated several plantations using enslaved labor and also served in both houses of the Virginia General Assembly and U.S. Congress. His maternal ancestors included William Randolph and John Stith, of the First Families of Virginia.

Gordon's parents lived at Longwood in Louisa County, Virginia. He had sisters and a younger brother James who would likewise become an attorney and serve in the state senate before moving to New York City. During the American Civil War, his mother moved the family to live on her family's cotton plantation in Halifax County, North Carolina. In 1868, he moved to Charlottesville, Virginia to live with his uncle, Mason Gordon. Gordon attended Charlottesville Institute. Gordon attended the University of Virginia for two years, beginning in 1873, and then taught at Charlottesville Institute and the high school. Gordon then studied law at the University of Virginia School of Law under John B. Minor. He was admitted to the bar in 1879.

== Career ==
=== Law career ===
Gordon started practicing law in Staunton, Virginia in October 1879. From 1883 to 1891, he became associated with Meade F. White and started the firm White and Gordon. During this time, he served as Commonwealth's Attorney for Staunton and then as Commonwealth's Attorney for Augusta County, Virginia. In January 1891, he practiced law under the firm Patrick and Gordon. He continued practicing with the firm until the death of his law partner, William Patrick, in 1909. He continued practicing law independently afterward.

=== Civic career ===
Gordon served as mayor of Staunton from 1884 to 1886. He served as the city attorney for Staunton for 10 years. He also served as the commissioner of chancery of Staunton in the Hustings Court and the Circuit Court, chairman of the city and county Democratic committees and president of the Staunton Chamber of Commerce.

He was a member of the Boards of Visitors of the College of William & Mary and the University of Virginia, where he also served as rector, and he served as the first chairman of the Virginia State Library Board from 1903 to 1919. His tenure on the University of Virginia board included the aftermath of the burning of The Rotunda. He was a president of The Virginia Bar Association, from 1920 to 1921.

== Personal life ==
Gordon married Marie Breckinridge Catlett on October 18, 1883. His wife died in 1930. Together, they had five children:

- Armistead C. Gordon Jr. (1897–1953), a professor of English literature at the University of Virginia
- George Loyall Gordon (1899–1918), died at the age of 18 during World War I
- James Lindsay Gordon (1895–1969)
- Margaret Douglas Gordon (1891–1930s)
- Mary Daniel Gordon (1893–1980)

== Awards ==
Gordon received an honorary Doctor of Laws degree from the College of William & Mary in 1906. He also received an honorary Doctor of Letters degree from Washington and Lee University in 1923.

== Death ==
Gordon died at his office in Staunton on October 21, 1931.

== Literary works ==
=== Poetry ===
Armistead Churchill Gordon & Thomas Nelson Page, Befo' de War: Echoes in Negro Dialect (New York: Charles Scribner's, 1888) (New York: C. Scribner's, 1893)

Armistead C. Gordon, For Truth and Freedom: Poems of Commemoration (Staunton, Virginia: A. Shultz, 1898)

Armistead C. Gordon, Vitali Lampada. A Song for a Centenary Year (1901)

Armistead C. Gordon, The Ivory Gate (New York: Neale Publishing Co., 1907)

Armistead C. Gordon, The Western Front (Staunton, Virginia: Privately Printed, 1928)

Armistead C. Gordon, The Fount of Castaly (Charlottesville, Virginia, 1934)

=== Law Poetry Anthologies ===
Armistead Churchill Gordon, "Law at our Boarding-House," in Ina Russelle Warren (ed.), The Lawyer's Alcove: Poems by the Lawyer, for the Lawyer and about the Lawyer 175-176 (New York: Doubleday, Page & Company, 1900) (Buffalo, New York: William S. Hein & Co., 1990)

=== Writings ===
Armistead C. Gordon, Congressional Currency. An Outline of the Federal Money System (New York: G.P. Putnam's Sons, 1895)

Armistead C. Gordon, The Gay Gordons: Ballads of an Ancient Scottish Clan (Staunton, Virginia: Albert Shultz, 1902)

Armistead C. Gordon, Gift of the Morning Star: A Story of Sherando (New York: Funk & Wagnalls, 1905)

Armistead C. Gordon, Robin Aroon, a Comedy of Manners (New York: Neale Pub. Co., 1908)

Armistead C. Gordon, William Fitzhugh Gordon. A Virginian of the Old School: His Life, Times, and Contemporaries (1787-1858)(New York: Neale Publishing Co., 1909)

Armistead C. Gordon & Edwin Alderman, J.L.M. Curry: A Biography (New York: Macmillan, 1911)

Armistead C. Gordon, Maje: A Love Story (New York: Charles Scribner's Sons, 1914)

Armistead C. Gordon, Ommirandy Plantation Life at Kingsmill (New York: Charles Scribner's Sons, 1917) (illustrated by Walter Biggs)

Armistead C. Gordon, Jefferson Davis. Figures From American History (New York: Charles Scribner's Sons, 1918)

Armistead C. Gordon, Gordons in Virginia: With Notes on Gordons of Scotland and Ireland (Hackensack, New Jersey: W. M. Clemens, 1918) (Rutland, Vermont: Tuttle Antiquarian Books, Inc., 1995) (Hackensack, New Jersey: W. M. Clemens, Limited ed., 1997)

Armistead C. Gordon, Some Lawyers in Colonial Virginia (Richmond, 1921)

Armistead C. Gordon (ed.), Virginian Writers of Fugitive Verse (:New York: J. T. White & Co., 1923)

Armistead C. Gordon (ed.), Men and Events: Chapters of Virginia History (Staunton, Virginia: The McClure Co., 1923)

Armistead C. Gordon, Memories and Memorials of William Gordon McCabe (Richmond: Old Dominion Press, 1925) (2 vols.)

Armistead C. Gordon, Allegra, The Story of Byron and Miss Clairmont Minton (Balch & Company, 1926)

Armistead C. Gordon, In the Picturesque Shenandoah Valley (Richmond: Garrett & Massie, Inc. 1930)

=== Bibliography ===
Armistead C. Gordon, A Bibliography of the Published Writings of Armistead C. Gordon, LL.D., LITT.D., 1923 (Staunton, Virginia: Priv. print. for the author by the McClure Co., 1923)

Besides these published volumes, Gordon wrote numerous other published works, including stories in Scribner's magazine and Harper's Magazine, and other works including a biographical sketch of William J. Robertson that was later published in a book of "Great Lawyers." His many public speeches include a speech from 1915 on the occasion of the unveiling of the monument to John Tyler in the Hollywood cemetery at Richmond, Virginia.

== See also ==
- List of mayors of Staunton, Virginia
