= 1906 Mid Cork by-election =

UK Parliamentary by-election

The 1906 Mid Cork by-election was held on 31 December. The by-election was held due to the resignation of the incumbent MP, D. D. Sheehan, who had been expelled from the Irish Parliamentary Party. Sheehan ran as Independent Labour and was elected unopposed. He remained as MP for the constituency until 1918.
