= Bud Davis =

American baseball player (1895–1967)

- Pitcher
- Born: December 7, 1895; Merry Point, Virginia, U.S.
- Died: May 26, 1967 (aged 71); Williamsburg, Virginia, U.S.
- Batted: Left Threw: Right

MLB debut
- April 19, 1915, for the Philadelphia Athletics

Last MLB appearance
- September 23, 1915, for the Philadelphia Athletics

MLB statistics
- Earned run average: 3.38
- Record: 0-1
- Strikeouts: 12
- Stats at Baseball Reference

Teams
- Philadelphia Athletics (1915)

John Wilbur Davis (December 7, 1895 in Merry Point, Virginia – May 26, 1967 in Williamsburg, Virginia) was an American Major League Baseball (MLB) pitcher who played for the Philadelphia Athletics in 1919. He would later re-establish himself as a hitter in the minor leaguers, becoming a star player at that level. He was nicknamed Bud and Country.

Davis began his major league career at the age of 19, making his debut on April 19, 1919. He spent 18 games with the Athletics that year (all but two of which were relief appearances), going 0–2 with a 4.05 ERA. In 66 2/3 innings, he allowed 59 walks and had only 18 strikeouts.

As a batter, he appeared in 21 games, being used as a pinch hitter a few times. In 26 major league at-bats, he hit .308 with three RBIs. He appeared in his final major league game on September 23, 1915 – however, that was not the end of his professional career.

From 1916 to 1922 (save for 1919, in which he did not play), Davis was used as a batter and a pitcher, posting a pitching record of 20–13 with a 1.93 ERA in 37 games with the Augusta Georgians in 1921. As a batter he hit .340 in 98 games that year.

Following the 1922 season, Davis switched to playing first base full-time. As a minor league player, Davis hit .331 with 253 home runs, 2,720 hits, 477 doubles and 131 triples in a 19-year career. He played in 2,244 games. As a pitcher, he went 47–49 in 122 games over a span of six seasons.

Following his death he was interred at Williamsburg Memorial Park.
