= D. D. Sheehan =

Irish politician

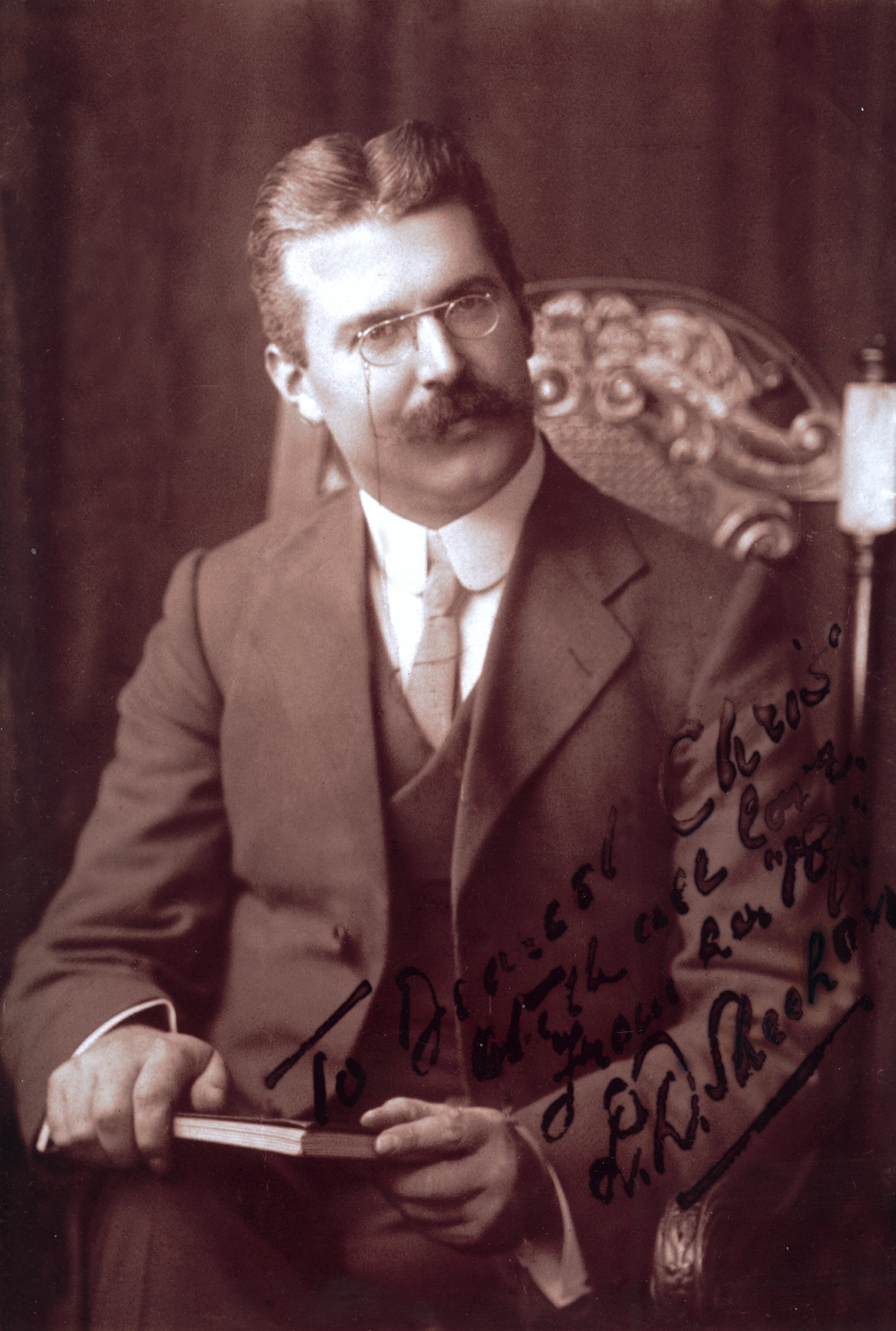
- Sheehan in 1910

Member of Parliament for Mid Cork
- In office 17 May 1901 – 14 December 1918
- Preceded by: Charles K. D. Tanner
- Succeeded by: Terence MacSwiney

Personal details
- Born: 28 May 1873 Kanturk, County Cork, Ireland
- Died: 28 November 1948 (aged 75) London, England
- Party: Irish Parliamentary Party, All-for-Ireland League
- Spouse: Mary Pauline O'Connor
- Occupation: Barrister, journalist, author

Military service
- Allegiance: United Kingdom of Great Britain and Ireland
- Branch/service: British Army
- Rank: Captain
- Unit: Royal Munster Fusiliers
- Battles/wars: World War I: Battle of Loos; Battle of the Somme

Daniel Desmond Sheehan, usually known as D. D. Sheehan (28 May 1873 – 28 November 1948) was an Irish nationalist, politician, labour leader, journalist, barrister and author. He served as Member of Parliament (MP) in the House of Commons of the United Kingdom of Great Britain and Ireland representing Mid-Cork from 1901 to 1918, a constituency comprising the districts of Ahadallane, Ballincollig, Ballyvourney, Blarney, Coachford, Farran, Inchigeelagh, Macroom, Millstreet and Shandangan. As co-founder and President of the Irish Land and Labour Association, he was credited with considerable success in land reform, labour reforms and in rural state housing. From 1909, he was General Secretary of the Central Executive of the All-for-Ireland League, favouring a policy of National reconciliation between all creeds and classes in Ireland. During World War I he served as Irish regiments officer with the 16th (Irish) Division in France, 1915–16. He resigned his parliamentary seat in 1918 and lived in England for several years, returning to Dublin following the ending of the civil war, when he was appointed editor of the Dublin Chronicle.

== Journalistic beginnings ==
Sheehan was born in Dromtariffe, near Kanturk, County Cork, Ireland, the second eldest of three sons and one daughter of Daniel Sheehan senior and Ellen Sheehan (née Fitzgerald). His father was an old Fenian, Kinsman of Canon P. A. Sheehan and tenant farmer. He was educated at the local primary school; in 1880 when he was seven years old, the family experienced eviction from the family homestead at the onset of the Irish Land League's Land War, when tenant farmers united to protest against landlords' excessive unjust rents by withholding payment.

Sheehan's family were supporters of the Fenian tradition, and his experience of discrimination made him a strong supporter of Irish nationalism. Sheehan was a continued supporter of Charles Stewart Parnell after the 'Parnell split' of 1890 in the Irish Parliamentary Party (IPP) and became a pro-Parnellite. He always remembered his only meeting with Parnell at Tralee, when Parnell was presented with a loyal address (drafted by Sheehan) from his Killarney supporters.

He began his career as a schoolteacher at the age of 16, studying land law and legal procedure when time allowed. He undertook part-time journalism from 1890 and was otherwise self-educated to a high literary degree. Sheehan was correspondent for the Kerry Sentinel, and later special correspondent to the Cork Daily Herald in Killarney. After he married in 1894, he moved in pursuit of journalistic experience temporarily to Scotland where in 1896 he joined the staff of the Glasgow Observer, then becoming London editor of the Catholic News in Preston, England.

In 1898, with the beginning of national self-reliance under the revolutionary Local Government Act (1898), which established the enfranchment of local electors and the creation of Local County Councils for the first time, allowing the development of a new political class capable of taking local affairs into their own hands, Sheehan returned to Ireland. He worked initially on various papers in Munster including the Cork Constitution and from 1899 until 1901 as editor of The Southern Star, Skibbereen, in which role it assured for the ILLA as well as the recently founded United Irish League that their branch reports were given weekly press coverage, particularly crucial for the expansion and growth of the UIL in Cork.

== Land and Labour leader ==
Early in his life when appointed correspondence secretary of the Kanturk Trade and Labour Council, Sheehan began active involvement in labour and trade union affairs – "I was engaged in an attempt to lead the labourers out of the poverty and misery that encompassed them" he wrote.

In August 1894 the Irish Land and Labour Association (ILLA) was formed to agitate on behalf of small tenant farmers and agrarian labourers as follower organisation to the Irish Democratic Trade and Labour Federation, setting forth Michael Davitt's achievements. As ILLA chairman, Sheehan in alliance with its secretary the Clonmel, County Tipperary solicitor J. J. O'Shee (Member of Parliament for West Waterford from 1895), they campaigned for radical changes both to the Irish Land Acts and the land and labour laws, in particular the granting of smallholdings to rural labourers. After Sheehan returned from a journalistic mission to England in 1898 he threw himself into organising the ILLA, at the same time convinced that social change could only be advanced by means of political and constitutional agitation, but at no times through physical force.

In the towns and in the country, labourers had to live in hovels and mud-wall cabins which bred death and disease, huddled together in indiscriminate wretchedness, landless and starving, the last word in pitiful rags and bare bones. The grant of Local Government and the extension of the franchise, enabled the labourers to eventually take a mighty stride in the assertion of their independent claims. Sheehan recorded that

"Those of us who had taken up the labourer’s cause . . . went our way building up branches, extending knowledge of the labourers' claims, educating these humble folk into a sense of their civic rights and citizen responsibilities . . . It was all desperate hard, uphill work, with little to encourage and no reward beyond the consciousness that one was reaching out a helping hand to the most neglected, despised and unregarded class in the community"

Under his leadership as president, the ILLA spread rapidly across Munster and later Connacht, campaigning vigorously on behalf of small tenant farmers for their tenant rights as well as claiming against the pitiful plight of the rural labourers, demanding sweeping changes, as P. F. Johnson before him, to the inadequate Land Acts, duly acknowledged by government. By 1900 he had helped found and organize nearly one hundred ILLA branches, mostly in County Cork, County Tipperary, and County Limerick, which increased to 144 by 1904.

The achievement was not without considerable middle-class hostility to the labourer movement. Farmer, shopkeeper, clerical and political party hostility originated not alone locally, ill-will was equally noticeable at a national level. The Irish Party leadership refused to consider direct Parliamentary representation to the Land and Labour Association, an indication of the middle-class determination with maintaining its hold over national politics.

=== Member of Parliament ===
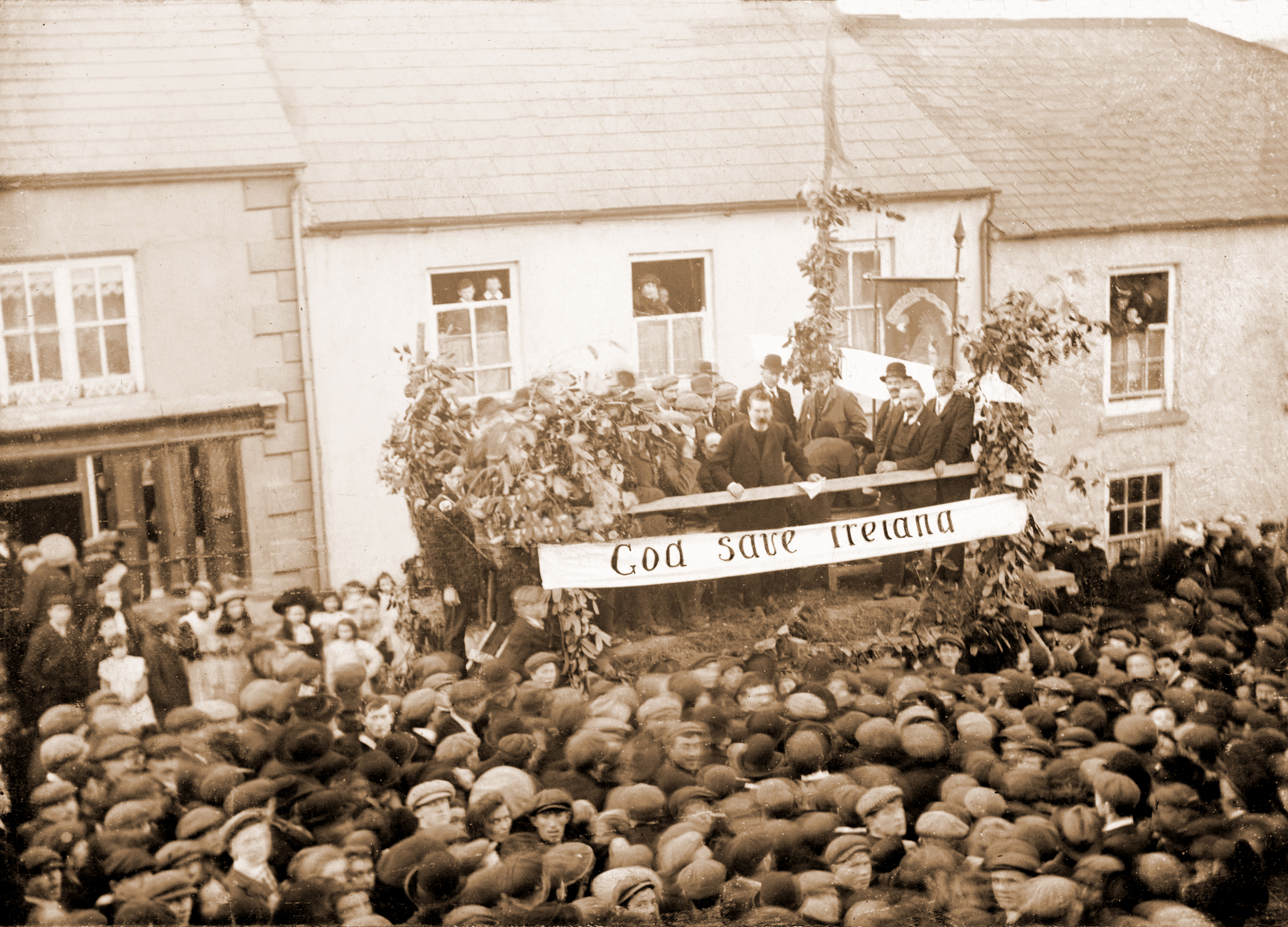
D. D. Sheehan MP (standing centre balcony), addressing large All-for-Ireland League rally in 1910 at Newmarket, County Cork.

Following the death of Dr C. K. D. Tanner (former Mid-Cork anti-Parnellite Nationalist MP from 1895), a United Irish League selection convention was called for 10 May 1901 in Macroom to decide between three candidates for the up-coming by-election. Standing as ILLA candidate on a solely labour platform, "D. D.", as he was popularly known, defeated the official local Irish Parliamentary Party (IPP) candidate Cornelelius O'Callaghan of Millstreet after a second ballot, amidst turbulent and occasionally violent scenes following an initial attempt by Joseph Devlin (representing the UIL National Directory), to exclude a number of ILLA branches from the convention. Sheehan was carried triumphantly from the venue and when finally returned as MP in the by-election of 17 May, he wrote:

My heart was with the neglected labourer and I stood, accordingly, as a Labour candidate, my programme being the social elevation of the masses, employment and wages. . . . .
This was heralded as a tremendous triumph for the Labour movement, . . . . .

Aged twenty-eight, he was the youngest, and one of the most outspoken, Irish nationalist party members of parliament at the House of Commons. Although admitted to the Party, his position as a labour representative, his own personal independence and not being a member of the United Irish League, made him something of an outsider. He wrote: "I was in the Party for one purpose, and one alone, of pushing the labourers' claims upon the notice of the leaders and of ventilating their grievances in the House of Commons whenever occasion offered" But from the outset in 1894, those Party leaders considered the ILLA to be a dangerous deviation from the party line.

=== Agrarian resurgence ===
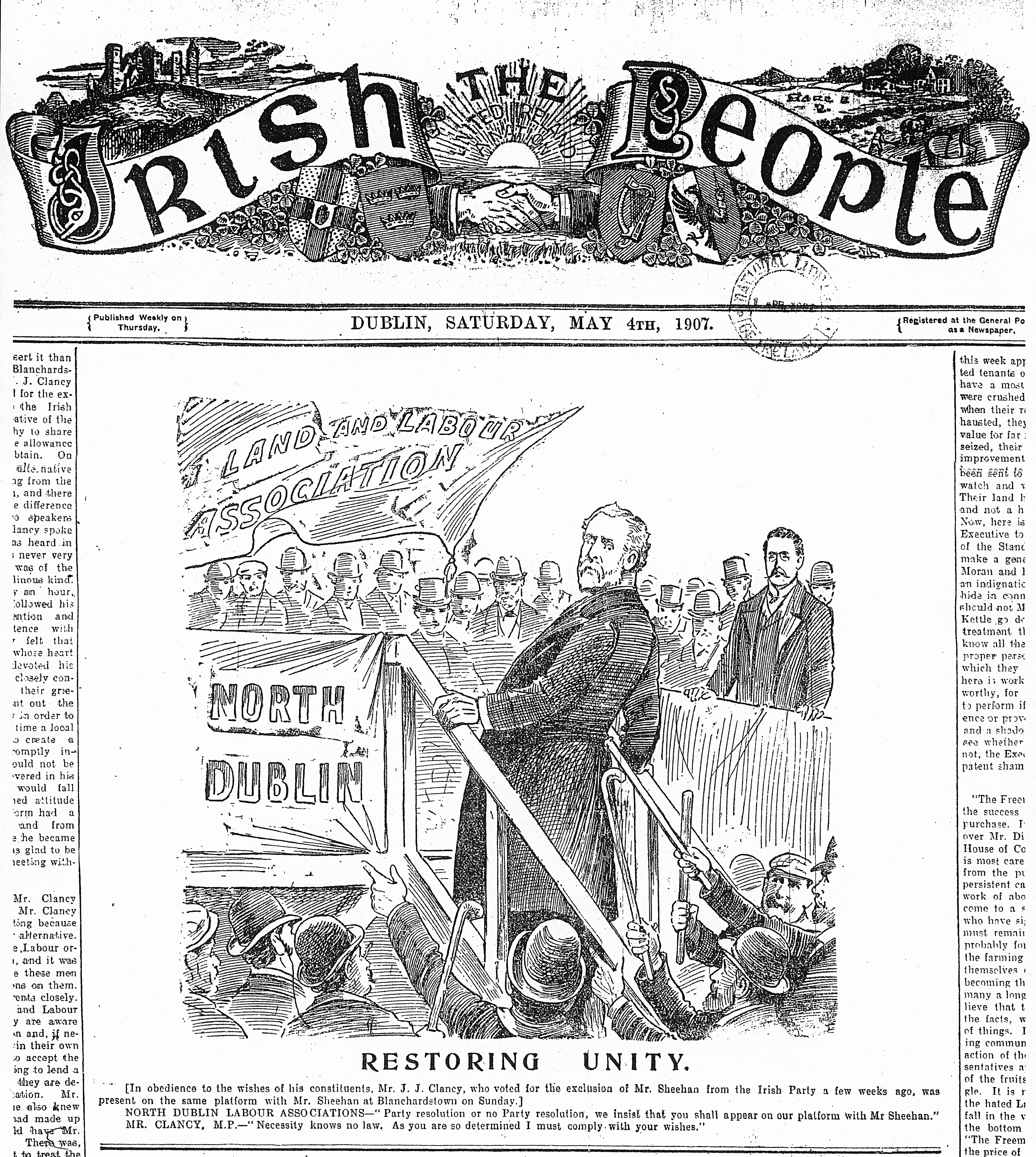
Sheehan MP (r), 1907, commanding the platform at a North County Dublin Land and Labour meeting.

Long associated with land agitation, Sheehan settled many disputes between landlord gentry and their under-privileged tenant farmers. In his capacity as honorary secretary of the Cork Advisory Committee, he was foremost in ending centuries of oppressive "landlordism" under the far reaching Irish Land Act 1903 (3 Edw. 7. c. 37). Crafted through Parliament following the 1902 Land Conference by his Mallow compatriot, William O'Brien MP, Sheehan successfully negotiated the larger number of the 16,159 tenant land purchases in Munster that decade. In his own words: "changing rack-rented farmers into peasant proprietors". The act was later extended to introduce compulsory purchase under the Birrell Land Purchase (Ireland) Act (1909).

From 1904 Sheehan was drawn to O’Brien for his willingness to agitate for a "settlement of the Irish labourers' grievances", and allied himself after O’Brien was alienated from the Irish Party for his conciliatory approach in securing the Land Act. Sheehan brought O’Brien the ally whose organisational skills and social programme secured him a County Cork base, his talents and ILLA branches placed at the disposal of the O'Brienite organisation in rural Munster. Sheehan and O'Brien established a Cork Advisory Committee which produced a higher rate of land purchase at lower prices than in any other county.

The January 1906 general election returned Sheehan unopposed. The IPP deputy leader John Dillon set about splitting the ILLA, forming a new ILLA group under its secretary, the Dillon and IPP loyal J. J. O'Shee (MP), – to confine Sheehan's movement, otherwise "the whole of Munster will be poisoned and no seat safe on vacancy". Later that year, the Irish Party mounted a feud against Sheehan for being a "factionist" by supporting a policy of Conciliation and for not allowing his labourers' movement be subservient to the Party autocracy, his reason being "to realize the great democratic principle of the government of the people, by the people and for the people". Also for not adhering to the party pledge and expelled both him and John O'Donnell from its ranks. It deprived them both of the quarterly party stipend provided for attendance at Westminster, particularly damaging because the first regular salary for an MP was set in 1911. Sheehan retaliated by resigning his seat in November and challenged the IPP to stand against him. He was re-elected unopposed as Ireland's first Independent Nationalist Labour MP on 31 December 1906. His income from then depended on constituent's collections at church gates on Sundays.

=== Sheehans' cottages ===
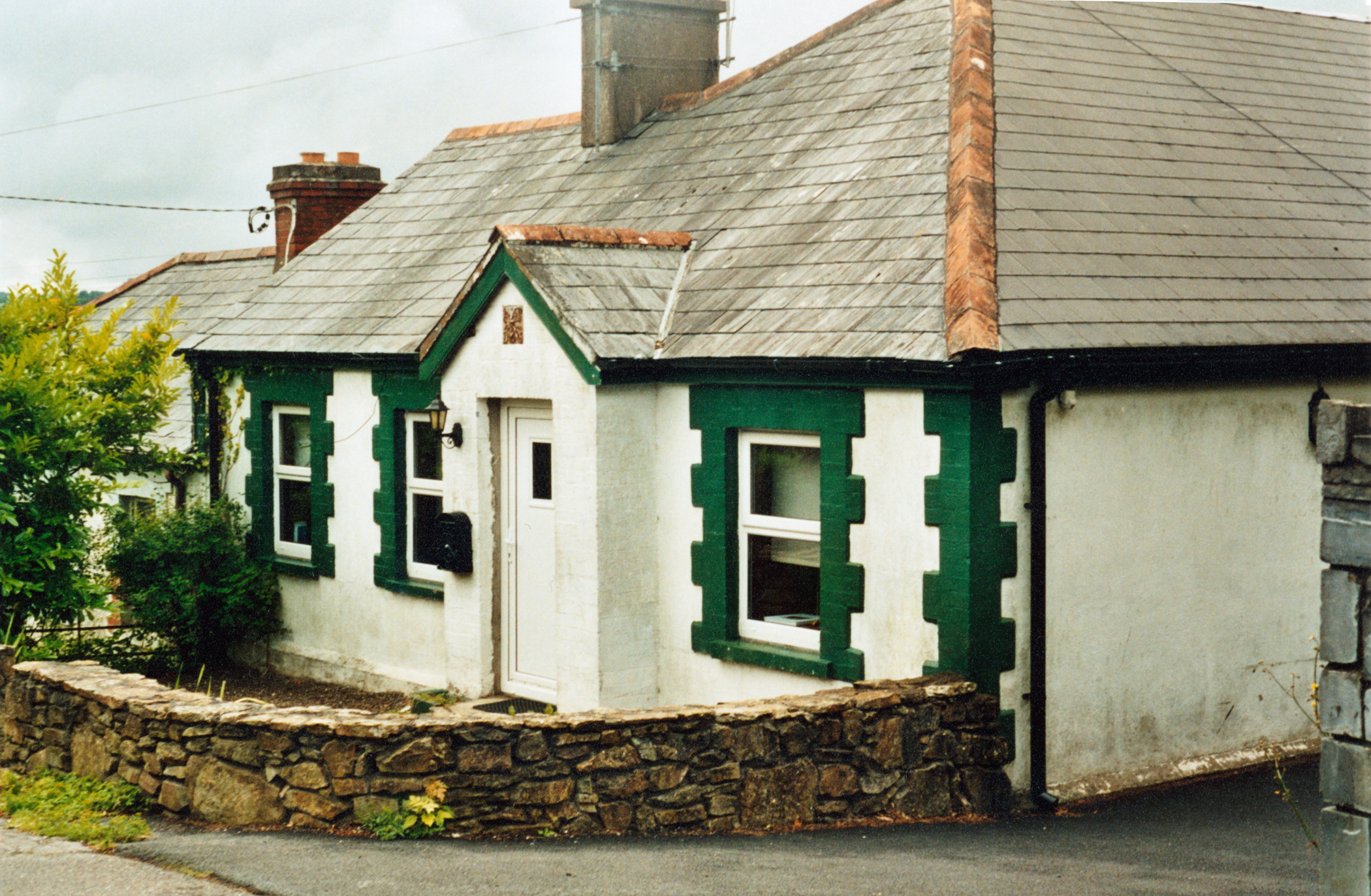
A Tower Model Village "Sheehans' cottage"

At countrywide ILLA meetings and in leading articles and editorials, Sheehan strove vigorously to attain betterment for the working Irish as in his June 1904 Commons speech on the Labourers (Ireland) Bill. Together with O'Brien under the "Macroom programme" their unabated pressure helped win passage of the exceptional Bryce Labourers (Ireland) Act (1906), remarkable its financial features for state sponsored rural housing, several provisions of which Sheehan suggested and drafted. He was convinced that nothing could be either final or satisfactory which did not ultimately "root the labourers in the soil".

The Act provided for the erection of over 40,000 cottages each on an acre of land, 7,560 alone in county Cork, known locally as Sheehans' cottages. It was followed by the Birrell Labourers (Ireland) Act (1911) with provision for further 5,000 dwellings. The dwellings provided homes for over 60,000 landless labourers and their families, comprising a rural population of a quarter of a million previously living wretchedly, mostly together with their livestock, in one room stone cabins and sod hovels.

Within a few years the resulting changes heralded an unprecedented socio-economic agrarian revolution in rural Ireland, with widespread decline of rampant tuberculosis, typhoid and scarlet fever.

A further important D. D. Sheehan landmark was his Tower Model Village scheme at Tower, near Blarney. He initiated, organised and furthered the completion of this unique co-operative project, developed in unison with a prominent local land owner, the ILLA branch and the Cork Rural District Council, initially comprising 17 cottages, provided with all local amenities including school, laundry and community hall on which he reported:

The decay of village life in Ireland constitutes one of the most tragic chapters of our history for the past half century. .... But even if we cannot resurrect the spirit of our former village life it is, however, well within our power to reconstruct ...... a Model Village on up-to-date and practical lines – a village which we trust may become a pattern and an example to be copied with profit and advantage in other parts of Ireland.

These achievements, won together with the local Land and Labour Associations, laid a solid foundation for the later successes of the labour movement in the province of Munster.

== All-for-Ireland League ==
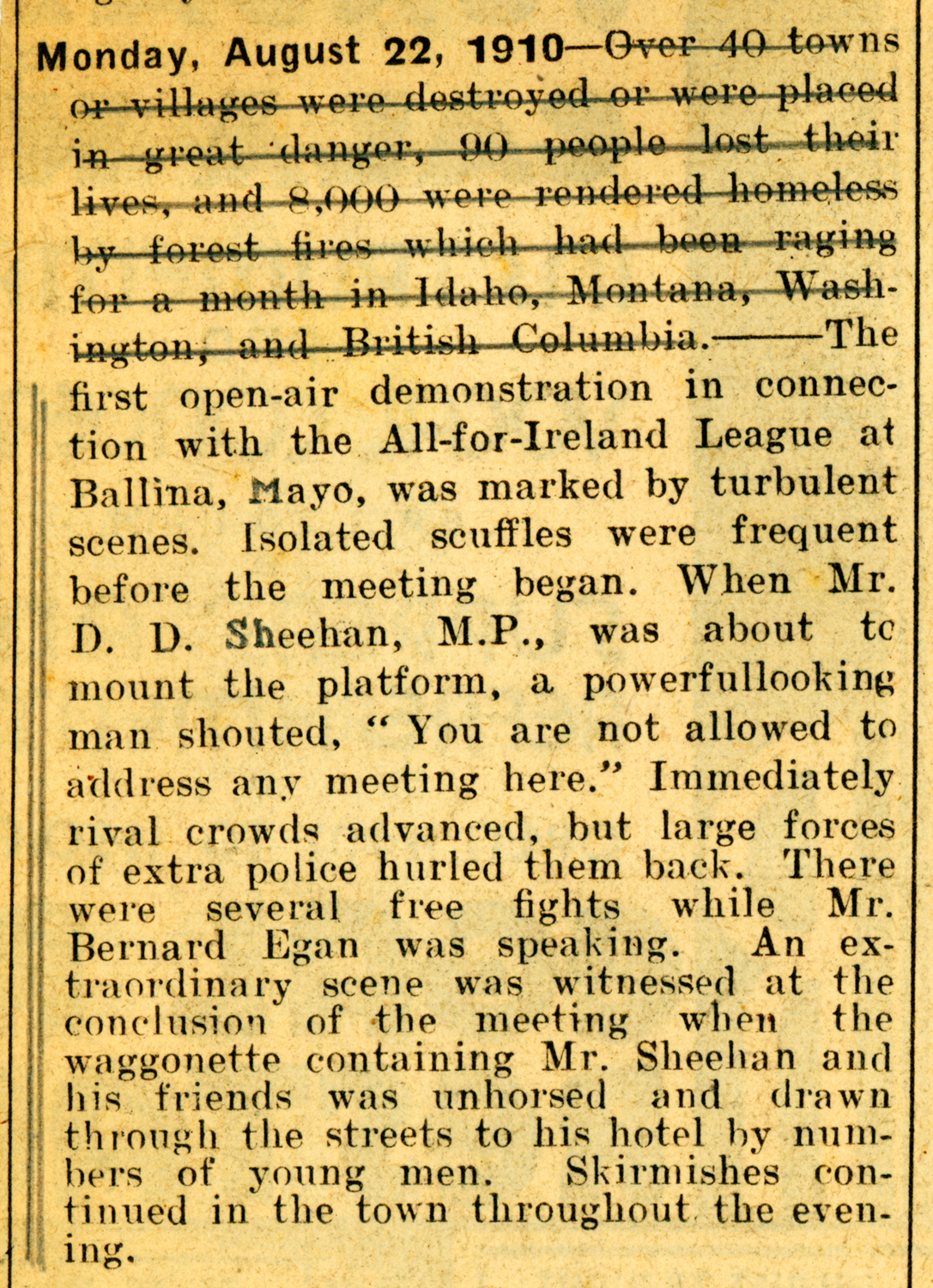
Turbulent AFIL demonstration at Ballina, County Mayo, 1910.

By 1907 there were seven earlier Irish Party MPs outside of the party. Proposals to reunite the party were made by both O'Brien and the Irish Party leader John Redmond with a meeting summoned for the Mansion House, Dublin in April 1908. Sheehan, O'Brien and others rejoined the party temporarily for the sake of unity. However, when Redmond called a National Convention for February 1909 to discuss amended funding of the 1903 Land Purchase Act, it ended with O'Brien and Sheehan being again driven from the party at what became known as the Baton Convention. It was "probably the stormiest meeting ever held by constitutional nationalists".

Subsequently, together with D. D. Sheehan as its organising honorary secretary, William O'Brien then inaugurated his new political movement, the All-for-Ireland League (AFIL) in Kanturk, March 1909. The League was a distinctively new political group whose deep conviction was that the success of a United Ireland parliament must depend on Irish Home Rule being won with the consent rather than by the compulsion of the Protestant minority. The political slogan of the AFIL was "the Three C's" – for Conference, Conciliation and Consent as applied to Irish politics, particularly to Home Rule. Sheehan rejected the Party leader Redmond's uncompromising "Ulster will have to follow" approach to Home Rule. The political activist Canon Sheehan of Doneraile was also a central AFIL founder member.

Prophetically farsighted, both Sheehan and O'Brien advocated granting Ulster every conceivable concession to overcome its fears of a Catholic-dominated Dublin parliament, as otherwise an All-Ireland settlement would fail. The two Sheehans contributed regularly to the League's newspaper the Cork Free Press, before it was suppressed in 1916 by the Chief Press Censor.

=== 1910 general elections ===
In autumn 1909 a Divisional Conference of the Irish Party was summoned for the purpose of "organising" Sheehan out of Mid-Cork and taking over his constituency. But whenever their delegations made an appearance in Cork they were quickly put to rout by Sheehan's followers. Opposed by the official IPP+UIL+AOH nominee William Fallon in the 24 January 1910 general election, as well as denounced by Catholic clerics for pitting labourer against farmer, he was returned with 2824 votes against 1999 for his opponent. Sheehan later commented on the contest:

I was left to fight my battle almost single handed, having arrayed against me two canons of my Church, and every Catholic clergyman in the constituency, with two or three notable exceptions. The odds seamed hopeless . . . . . . . but . . . I scored a surprising majority . ., and I have good reason for stating that 95 percent of the illiterate votes were cast in my favour, although a most powerful personal canvass was made of every vote in the constituency by the clergy.

Throughout 1910 he turned to promoting the conciliatory and political principles of the All-for-Ireland League. The growth in strength of the AFIL in areas previously dominated by the UIL was accompanied by considerable conflict and hostilities. A renewed election was called on 28 November due to a parliamentary stalemate at Westminster. Sheehan campaigned for the AFIL's policies at large meetings across counties Cork and Limerick, in Mayo together with O'Brien – coming under revolver fire at Crossmolina – their party generally handicapped by lack of clerical support. In the December 1910 election he retained his seat with 2738 votes against 2115 for his IPP opponent T. Corcoran. The AFIL Party returned eight MPs in the nine Cork constituencies.

At election times broadsheets and ballads sung to popular airs extolling the candidates' merits were commonplace, one such entitled The Ballad of D. D. Sheehan made the rounds in 1910, was re-published in 1968.

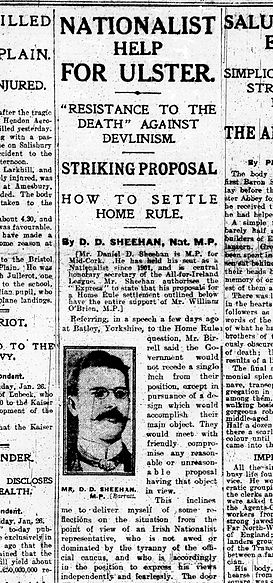
Sheehan's proposals for Ulster, Daily Express, 27 January 1914

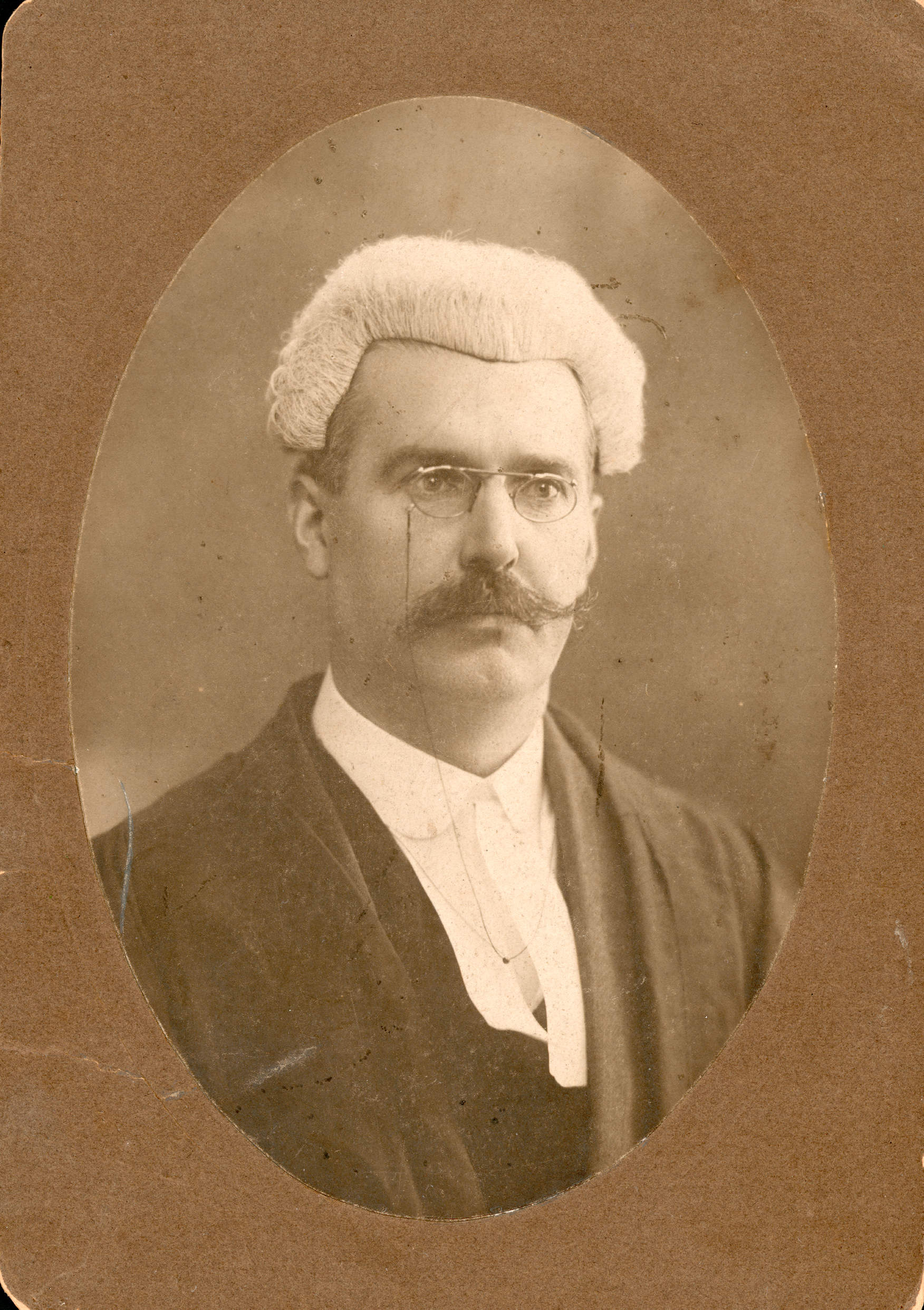
D. D. Sheehan BL as barrister 1911 in wig and gown

=== Barrister-at-law ===
While in parliament he was called to the Irish Law Bar as barrister on 3 July 1911, having been exhibitioner and prizeman in law University College Cork (1908–09) and honoursman King's Inns Dublin (1910), practising on the Munster circuit.

=== Dominion Home Rule ===
In 1911 the All-for-Ireland Party specifically proposed Dominion Home Rule in a letter to Prime Minister Asquith as the wisest of all solutions for Ireland. During 1913–1914, Sheehan was active in promoting an Imperial Federation League having as its immediate object a federal settlement of the Home Rule question as the alternative to Ulster's threat of partition. He later became vice-chairman of the League.

In January 1914 he published specific proposals and concessions the AFIL perceived acceptable to Ulster to enable them to come in on an All-Ireland Home Rule settlement, which however the Irish Party and Dillon turned down with "no concessions to Ulster". Later in the Commons, Sir Edward Carson, the Ulster Unionist Party leader, acknowledged that concessions proposed by the AFIL for Ulster to participate in Home Rule were praiseworthy, adding that had they been earlier supported rather than thwarted by the Irish Parliamentary Party, Ulster's objections might have been overcome.

In May 1914, the AFIL resolutely resisted the violation of Ireland's national unity and as a final protest before history, abstained from voting on the amended Third Home Rule Act which provided for the temporary exclusion of six Ulster counties in what the AFIL called would be an irreversible partition deal.

== Great War ==
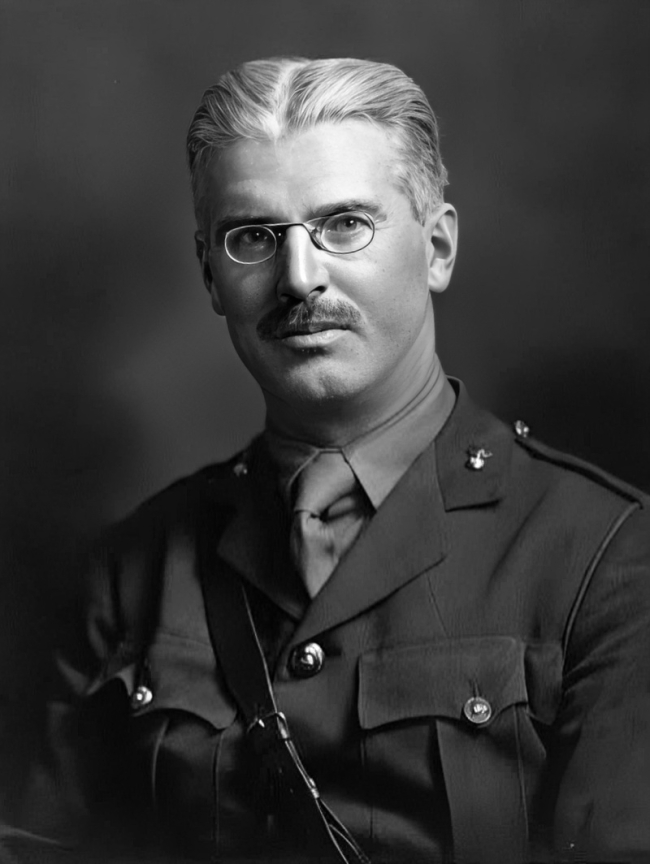
in his RMF military uniform 1917

=== Armageddon ===
With the involvement of Ireland in World War I when war was declared with Germany in August 1914, Sheehan gave support to William O'Brien's call for voluntary enlistment in the Irish regiments of Kitchener's New Service Army, regarding service to be both in the interest of the Allied cause of a Europe free from oppression as well as in the interest of an All-Ireland Home Rule settlement.

In November, despite being aged 41 and father of a large family, he offered himself for enlistment, as did the National Volunteers and four other Irish nationalist MPs, J. L. Esmonde, Stephen Gwynn, Willie Redmond and William Redmond and former MP Tom Kettle. Trained at Buttevant barracks County Cork, gazetted lieutenant, he practically raised the 9th (Service) Battalion of the Royal Munster Fusiliers, a regiment of the 16th (Irish) Division. Due to manpower casualty shortages in other RMF regiments Sheehan was re-drafted on 30 May 1915 to the 2nd RMF (Regular) Battalion.

Three of his sons also joined. One, aged 16, was in 1915 the youngest commissioned officer on the Western Front. Sheehan's two other sons were killed serving with the Royal Flying Corps/Royal Air Force; his daughter, a VAD front nurse, was disabled in a bombing raid. A brother serving with the Irish Guards severely disabled and a brother-in-law killed at Passchendaele.

In the spring and summer of 1915, Sheehan undertook the organisation and leadership of voluntary enlistment campaigns in County Cork, County Limerick, and County Clare. Receiving Captaincy and Company command in July 1915, he served with the 2nd RMF Battalion along the Loos salient in France under Irish Major General William Hickie. From early 1916, he contributed a series of widely quoted articles from the trenches to the London Daily Express, the Irish Times, and the Cork Constitution.

Deafness by shellfire and ill-health necessitated his transfer to the 3rd RMF (Reserve) Battalion at Aghada, then Ballincollig barracks, County Cork. Hospitalised often, he was decommissioned late 1917, with a bulletin stating that he "relinquished his commission on account of ill-health contracted on active service, and is granted the permanent honorary rank of Captain, 13 Jan.1918". Sheehan was awarded the World War I campaign medals: 1914–15 Star, British War Medal, Victory Medal and Silver War Badge.

Those Irish who died in the war are commemorated at the Island of Ireland Peace Park, Messines, Belgium and the Irish National War Memorial Gardens, Dublin, Ireland as well as by Sheehan in his verse A Tribute and a Claim.

=== Making way ===
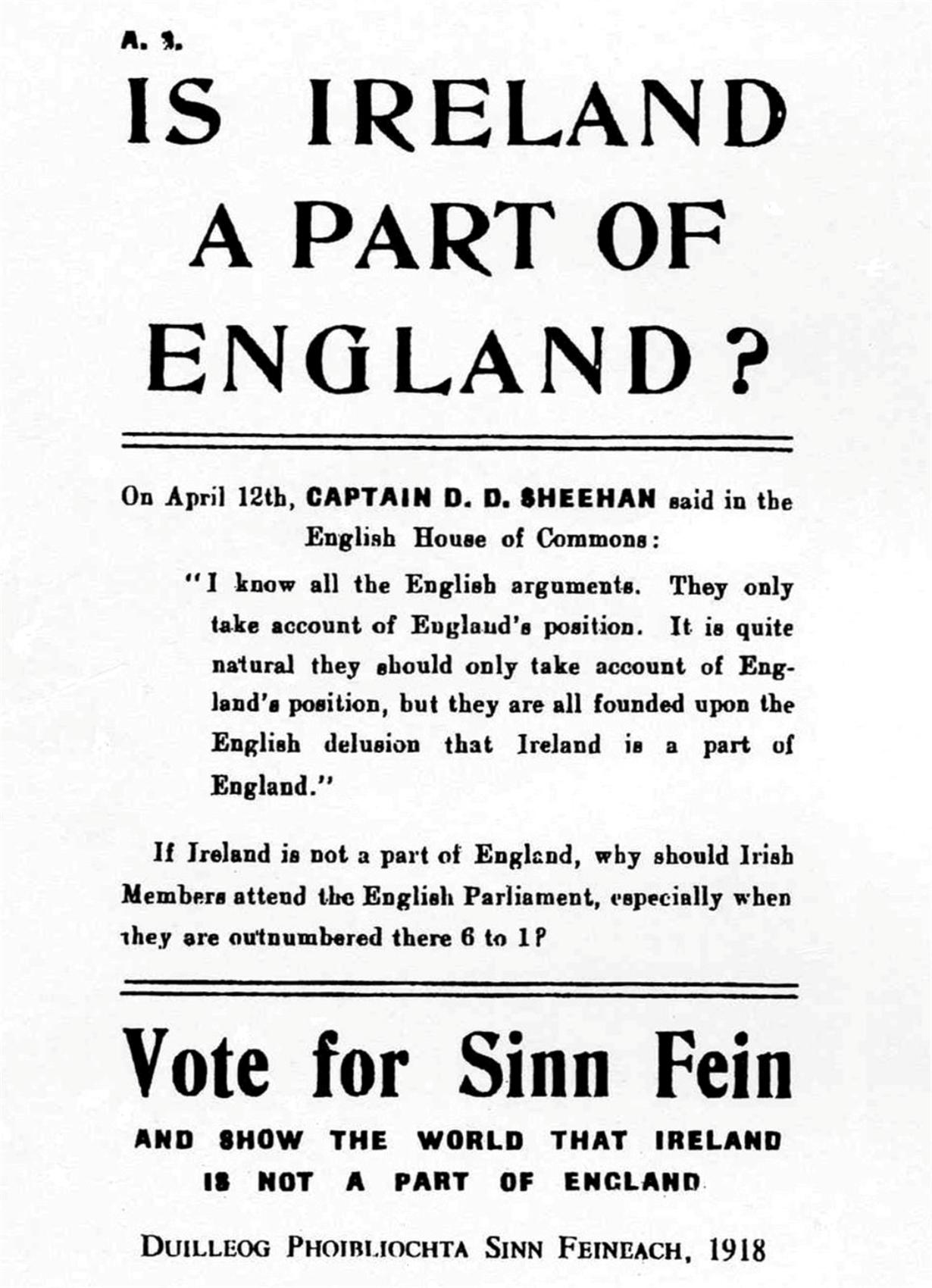
1918 SF election poster cites Sheehan's Commons speech.

Continuing to pursue Irish interests in parliament, he vehemently condemned British mishandling of Irish affairs, during the April Conscription Crisis threatening in a dramatic anti-conscription speech in the Commons "to fight you if you enforce conscription on us".

Sheehan later expressed disillusionment at Britain's and the Irish Party's failure to agree on All-Ireland Home Rule. The AFIL members, seeing their political concepts for an All-Ireland settlement displaced by the path of militant physical-force, recognised the futility of contesting the 1918 general election in December. William O'Brien had been co-operating since 1910 with, and acting as spokesman in parliament for Arthur Griffith's moderate Sinn Féin movement, so that as Sheehan confirmed:

at the general election O'Brien and all the other members of the Independent Nationalist group the present writer included, withdrew from the contest and signed a manifesto calling upon their followers to support the new movement. This appeal of ours met with enthusiastic response, Sinn Féin candidates being elected for our constituencies in every instance.

Terence MacSwiney followed Sheehan as MP for mid-Cork. In the changed political climate strongly opposed to Sheehan's earlier army service and recruiting, and faced with intimidation, he and his family abandoned their Cork city home and exiled to London, as recorded.

=== Labour allegiance ===
During the Commons debate in October 1918 on the Irish Land (Provision for Soldiers) Bill, in the course of a lengthy speech Sheehan said:

... even although it may only benefit 3,000 or 4,000 of those Irish soldiers who have patriotically fought for their country and for the liberties of the world ... I want this measure to become law and to become operative ...

With an election demand of "Land for fighters" aimed at returned ex-servicemen, Sheehan contested in December the 1918 general election as the Labour Party candidate for the Limehouse division of Stepney in London's East End and polled 2,470 votes second to the returned Liberal, over a million demobilised servicemen still in Europe were unfortunately unable to vote. His demand was vindicated by the government's subsequent "Land for Soldiers" small holdings and cottage scheme announced in January. It became the Irish Land (Provision for Sailors and Soldiers) Act, 1919 which provided thousands of cottages for Irish ex-servicemen and their dependents. His engagement with Labour paved the way for his successor in this constituency, the later Labour Prime Minister Clement Attlee.

1918 general election: Stepney, Limehouse
Party		Candidate	Votes	%	±%
C	Liberal	William Pearce	5,860	59.9	+5.3
	Labour	D. D. Sheehan	2,470	25.2	N/A
	National	Charles Herbert Roswell	1,455	14.9	N/A
Majority			3,390	34.7	+25.5
Turnout			29,275	33.4	−39.7
	Liberal hold		Swing	N/A	
C indicates candidate endorsed by the coalition government.

From 1920 he eked out a living in journalism, in 1921 published his authoritative book, Ireland since Parnell, covering the period Parnell to Sinn Féin. Unable to practise at the bar due to impaired hearing (sustained in the war), made some business endeavours, for a time Literary Editor, leader writer and dramatic critic of the Sunday National News, and in 1925 publisher and editor of The Stadium, a daily newspaper for sportsmen.

== New beginnings ==
After earlier intimidations ceased to be an impediment, he returned to Dublin in 1926 (his ailing wife died soon afterwards). He was managing editor of the Irish Press and Publicity Services and from 1928 co-publisher and editor of the South Dublin Chronicle, a weekly newspaper (3 Jan 1925 – 13 July 1929) covering township and district news. In July 1929 the paper was re-titled the Dublin Chronicle (20 July 1929 – 1 Aug 1931) by a new directorate, with Sheehan as managing director and editor. Its editorial objectives were:

To pursue a policy of fearless independence. Remove all barriers of distrust that separate North and South on the question of National Unity. Land and Labour as the most important factors of Irish life. Putting deep sea fisheries on an economic basis. Social issues, the grave evil of the slums – the need to speed up housing of the impoverished masses.

=== Labour "Chronicle" ===
In a series of six front pages articles in the Dublin Chronicle under his name during 1929, Sheehan exposed and highlighted with harrowing descriptions the lives of the slum poor:

The Frightful Slums of Dún Laoghaire – Avoca Square the Gateway to hell, its horrors (14 Sept.)
The Council as Slum Owners – The Scandal of Crofton Parade, consumption takes its toll (28 Sept.)
Housing in Bray – An Appalling Report- Would not pass as cattle stables (9 Nov.)

Interviews followed with Lord Longford and General Richard Mulcahy, Minister for Local Government, on means to house the great numbers of poor people. On a wider range of important issues, he admonished the Irish Labour Party (ILP) for neither having an active agricultural policy nor a fighting programme. He rigorously demanded national de-rating for farmers and objected to the County Council "manager system", proposing instead the establishment of separate independent coastal Boroughs north and south of Dublin. Sheehan repeatedly stressed the need for the housing of labourers and unskilled worker and the abolition of slums.

Sheehan condemned Republicans for two militant articles they published in An Phoblacht criticising Irish ex-servicemen of the Great War "that they fought for England ... and so forth". He countered:

Nothing of the kind! They fought for liberty, they fought for the freedom of humanity, and against the spirit of Prussianism, which if it had prevailed would put the whole world under the sway of an atrocious tyranny. ...... The thing is too absurd and ridiculous for words, yet it is those puerile arguments that are being trotted out again and again by those who never spared the art of lying and wilful perversion when dealing with Irishmen of the Great War.

Controversial themes continued to be highlighted during 1930 in the Dublin Chronicle, particularly when calling for freedom of speech after the "disgraceful breaking up" of the new Labour Party's inaugural meeting on 8 April in the Mansion House by organised gangs of Fianna Fáil and Peadar O'Donnell followers shouting "Up de Valera" and "Up Devlin".

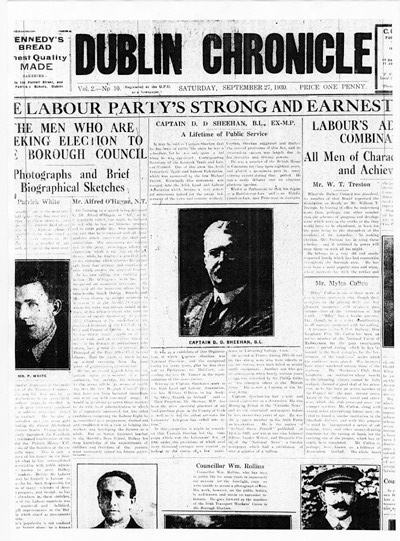
D. D. Sheehan (centre) campaigning with Labour Party team in the elections

=== Parting hurrah ===
Leading up to 29 September 1930, Dublin County Council and Borough elections and the August nomination of eight official Labour candidates, Sheehan held town hall meetings from Bray to Balbriggan, emphasising:

When he consented to become a candidate in that election, he did so on account of one thing only – the betterment of his fellowmen, and the progress and advancement of all classes. ....... He had done that all his life .... such record as he possessed was one that had been always associated with Labour.

The Dublin Chronicle gave broad promotional support to Labour prior to the election, unlike the very reserved announcement of the election in the official ILP's Irishman. But it was not to be. Only the three previous Labour councillors were re-elected. Sheehan finished mid-field in the list of candidates, his housing campaign hijacked by the larger party rivals Fianna Fáil and Cumann na nGaedheal.

The election epitomised the dilemma of the Labour Party. In contrast to Sheehan's policy of basic social change and political inclusiveness, the ILP confused voters with a mixed message. The party's new March constitution abandoned its working class character and diluted its objectives, in its desire and in order to broaden the class basis of the new party to appeal to white-collar professionals. In the long term it also failed due to lack of branch organisation (Dublin having only one branch) so that in the following 1932 general election its number of Dáil seats sank to an all-time low of 7, from 13 in September 1927 (and 22 in 1922).

=== Service – not self ===
In January 1931 the Dublin Chronicle promoted a new Irish Industries Purchasing League with a campaign advocating the need to Buy Irish Goods, which was welcomed and supported by Irish manufacturers and retail outlets alike. Sheehan relentlessly pursued the unresoved questions of slums and housing. He then called for the early selection of suitable candidates to stand for Labour at the next (1932) general election. Publication of the Chronicle ended in August 1931 brought on by the world economic Great Depression.

From the 1930s, unable to practise in court due to impaired hearing from the war, as advocate Sheehan provided legal advice and assistance to former constituents, to help them defend against claims on their right to security of tenure and ownership entitlements of their lands, granted under earlier legislation. Also helped unemployed Irish ex-servicemen of the Great War, many sons of families he once housed and later recruited, supported Old Comrades Associations (O.C.A's) providing lines of communication and information north and south of the Free State border, editing the Northern and Southern Ireland edition of their central council's Annual Journal, its motto "Service – not self". In 1945, reporting on its work he wrote:

It has been beset by many difficulties, has had to overcome prejudice and to surmount numerous other obstacles, yet its work of helping the Irish ex-serviceman and his dependants has been carried on with unwearied effort and considerable success.

Sheehan tried unsuccessfully to regain his Cork seat in the early 1940s when Paddy McAuliffe was selected to run for Labour in the 1943 general election for the North Cork constituency. Pressed by former political friends Sheehan then proposed to General Richard Mulcahy that he stand as candidate for Fine Gael in the Cork South-East constituency (which included part of his old Mid-Cork constituency and other areas where ex-servicemen lived), but his offer was declined.

== Personal background ==
On 6 February 1894, he married Mary Pauline O'Connor, daughter of Martin O'Connor, Bridge Street, Tralee, County Kerry;
they had five sons (and five daughters, the youngest Mona b. 1912 (Ms Rutland-Barsby) died 24 Sep 2008):

- Daniel Joseph Sheehan (2nd Lt Royal Flying Corps) – killed May 1917 on active service during World War I (1894–1917).
  He is buried in the Commonwealth War Graves Commission's Cabaret Rouge Cemetery, France; Grave no. N16.
- Martin Joseph Sheehan (2nd Lt Royal Air Force) – killed October 1918 on active service during World War I (1896–1918).
  He is buried in the Commonwealth War Graves Commission's Anneux World War I Cemetery, France; Grave no. H21.
- Michael Joseph Sheehan (Brigadier, OBE, CBE, Indian Army, Burma Campaign World War II) (1899–1975)
- Patrick A. Sheehan (later known as Pádraig A. Ó Síocháin SC), (Honorable Society of King's Inns) (1905–1995)
- John F. Sheehan (Surgeon, Lt-Colonel, Medical Corps Indian Army, Burma Campaign World War II), (later Harley Street surgeon) (1909–1985)
- Sgt Robert O'Connor (Leinster Regiment), (brother-in-law), killed at Passchendaele during World War I (1880–1917)

(All family members settled in England, except P. A. Ó Síocháin, a staunch nationalist).

Sheehan died on 28 November 1948, aged 75, while visiting his daughter Mona in Queen Anne Street, London.

== Sources and references ==
=== Works ===
- Writing: Ireland since Parnell (1921)
- Speeches (Commons)
- Poems
- Articles
- Works in Wikisource

=== References ===
- O'Brien, William: An Olive Branch in Ireland pp. 388–392, (1910) University College Cork, Library
- O'Brien, Joseph: William O'Brien and the course of Irish politics pp. 166–7, 170, 172, 179, 192, 194, 198, 204, University of California Press (1976), ISBN 0-520-02886-4
- Ó Síocháin, P. A. S.C.: Ireland journey to freedom (1990), Foilsiúcháin Éireann (1990) ISBN 1-872490-02-6
- Denman, Terence: Ireland's unknown soldiers, Irish Academic Press (1992) ISBN 0-7165-2495-3
- Lane, Pádraig G., The Land and Labour Association 1894–1914, Journal of the Cork Historical and Archaeological Society, Vol.98, pp. 90–106 (1993), Cork City Council Library
- Maume, Patrick: The Long Gestation, Irish Nationalist Life 1891–1918 pp. 70–72, 74, 81, 76, 95, 99, 100, 101, 104, 105, 107, 127, 152–3, 160, 172, 243,
  Gill & Macmillan (1999) ISBN 0-7171-2744-3
- Maume, Patrick in: McGuire, James and Quinn, James (eds): Dictionary of Irish Biography From the Earliest Times to the Year 2002;
  Royal Irish Academy Vol. 7, pp. 875–78; Cambridge University Press (2009) ISBN 978-0-521-19981-0
- Galvin, Michael M.: Kilmurry 1906-1910; People and Politics The Year of Two Elections 1910, D.D. Sheehan Triumphant, pp. 74–104, Kilmurry Archaeological and Historical Society, Carrig Print (2011)
- O’Donovan, John: Class, Conflict, and the United Irish League in Cork, 1900-1903 in SAOTHAR 37 pp. 19–29, Journal of the Irish Labour History Society, D. D. Sheehan pp. 20–22, (2012) ISSN 0332-1169
- Dillon, John: DD Sheehan BL MP, His Life and Times, Foilsiúcháin Éireann Nua (2013) ISBN 978-0-9576456-1-5
- O'Donovan, John: Daniel Desmond (D. D.) Sheehan and the Rural Labour Question in Cork (1894-1910) Ch.13 pp. 220–237 in
  Casey, Brian (Ed.) Defying the Law of the Land: Agrarian Radicals in Irish History, History Press (2013) ISBN 978-1-8458880-1-5
- Bunbury, Turtle: The Glorious Madness, Tales of The Irish and The Great War;
  Captain D D Sheehan, MP for Mid-Cork, pp. 61–73 Gill & Macmillan, Dublin 12 (2014) ISBN 978 0717 16234 5

Parliament of the United Kingdom
Preceded by Charles Kearns Deane Tanner	Member of Parliament for Mid Cork; 1901 – 1918	Succeeded by Terence MacSwiney
