= Charles Kearns Deane Tanner =

Irish surgeon and politician

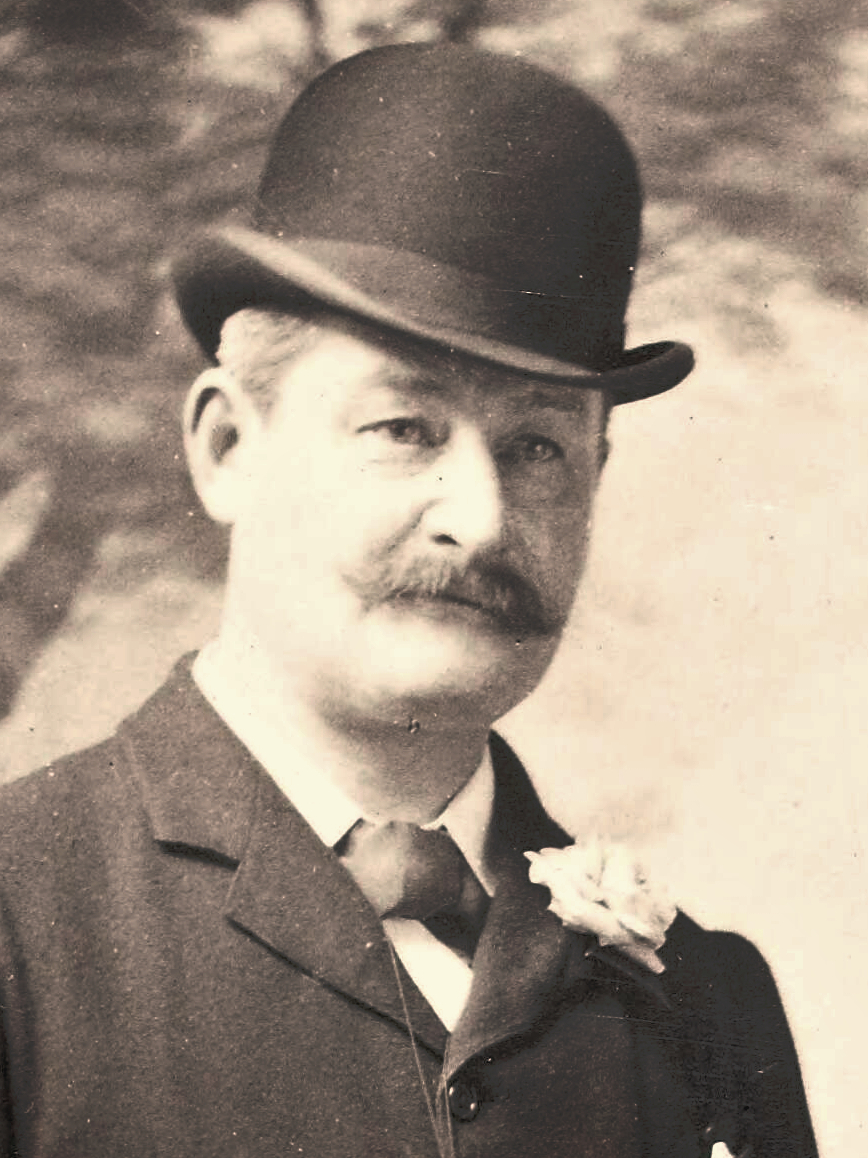
Tanner, c. 1890s

Dr Charles Kearns Deane Tanner (20 September 1849 – 21 April 1901) was an Irish surgeon and politician.

Dr. Charles Kearns Deane-Tanner was the uncle of early Hollywood director William Cunningham Deane-Tanner, better known as William Desmond Taylor.

== Life ==
Tanner was born in Cork, the son of notable surgeon Dr. William Kearns Deane-Tanner and Eliza Sharpe, educated in Paris and Winchester, and studied arts and medicine at Queen's College, Cork and the Universities of Leipzig and Berlin. He practised as a surgeon at South Cork Infirmary and County Hospital and lectured on anatomy at Queen's College.

In the general election of 1885, Tanner was elected Irish Parliamentary Party MP for the Mid Cork constituency, and was re-elected unopposed for the seat until his death. Like other activists for Home Rule, his involvement in Parliament was controversial, as his behaviour was often obstructive. The Times remarked after his death that "it was difficult to regard him as a serious politician ... he came repeatedly under the censure of the Speaker".

The Church Standard remarked that "there was scarcely a session that he did not make a fierce attack upon the ministry" and he "was credited with the record of having been more frequently "suspended" from the House of Commons for violent speech than any other member of the body". He was actively involved in the Plan of Campaign, and was a supporter of Parnell until Parnell made an adverse comment about Tanner's father. When the Parnell split occurred, Tanner joined the Anti-Parnellite Irish National Federation. Tanner's politics were at odds with many in his Anglo-Irish family. This caused quite a bit of controversy within the family.

== Death ==
He died in 1901 of consumption and was buried at Kensal Green Cemetery, London next to the grave of his brother Dr. Lombard John Newman Deane-Tanner.

== Notes ==
Parliament of the United Kingdom
New constituency	Member of Parliament for Mid Cork; 1885 – 1901	Succeeded by Daniel Desmond Sheehan
