= James Garland (Virginia politician) =

American politician

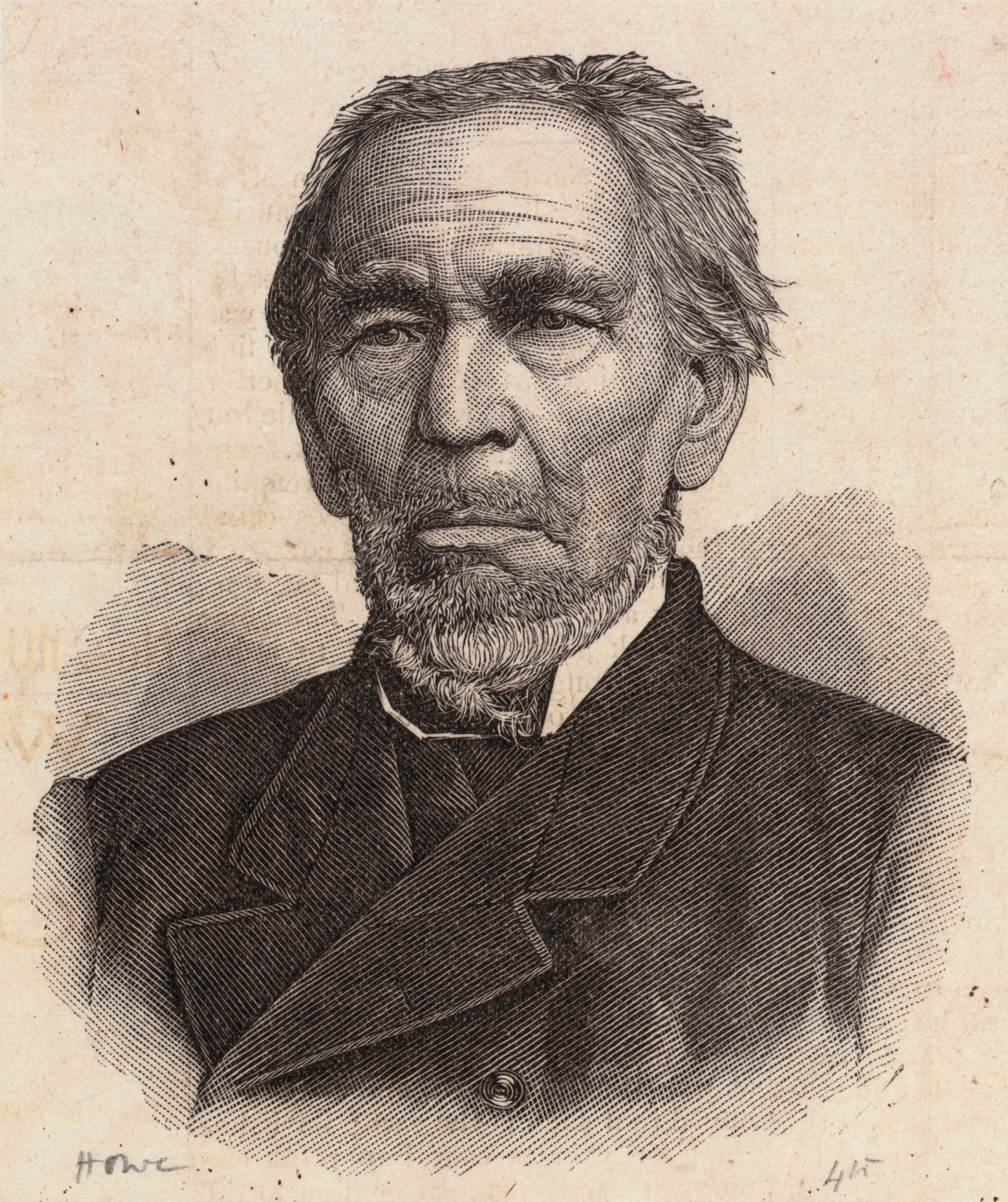

Member of the U.S. House of Representatives from Virginia's 12th district
- In office March 4, 1835 – March 3, 1841
- Preceded by: William F. Gordon
- Succeeded by: Thomas W. Gilmer

Member of the Virginia House of Delegates
- In office December 7, 1829 – December 4, 1831
- Preceded by: Robert Rives, Jr.
- Succeeded by: Joseph C. Cabell

Personal details
- Born: June 6, 1791 Ivy Depot, Virginia, U.S.
- Died: August 8, 1885 (aged 94) Lynchburg, Virginia, U.S.
- Spouse: Sarah Burch
- Profession: lawyer

James Garland (June 6, 1791 – August 8, 1885) was a 19th-century politician, military officer, planter, lawyer and judge from Virginia. From 1835 to 1841, he was a member of the U.S. House of Representatives for three terms. He had previously served in the War of 1812.

== Early and family life ==
Born in Ivy Depot, Albemarle County, Virginia, James Garland was the eldest of four sons born to Hudson Martin Garland (1773–1863) and his wife, the former Elizabeth Penn (née Phillips) Garland (1763–1846). His mother was the grandniece of William Penn. His father was one of many lawyer Garlands in Albemarle County, but moved to Amherst County (from which Nelson County was divided) after the death of his father (another James Garland) in 1781. Hudson Garland represented Amherst County in the Virginia General Assembly for one term (December 3, 1804 – February 1, 1805) and served as a captain in the war of 1812. Another of Hudson Garland's sons became General John Garland, who continued his Army career through the war with Mexico, and served briefly during the American Civil War, but died of disease in New York City on June 5, 1861); his daughter had become the wife of Lt. Confederate General James Longstreet. Another brother, Samuel Garland Sr., became a successful lawyer in Lynchburg, as well as a landowner (for whom Garland Hill was named), and the uncle of Confederate Brig. General Samuel Garland, Jr. (who died in September 1862).

This James Garland received a private education and began reading law, and married Sarah Burch in the newly created Nelson County on September 22, 1814. They had at least one daughter who survived them (Sallie B. Garland Christian, 1837–1928). By 1820, the Garland household included five free people (including two sons and a daughter younger than 10) and nine slaves.

== Career ==
After reading law and being admitted to the Virginia bar, Garland began practicing law practice in Lovingston, Virginia, the seat of Nelson County. He left practice for a short time to serve in the War of 1812.

=== State house ===
James Garland represented Nelson County in the Virginia House of Delegates from 1829 to 1831 (initially alongside Zachariah Nevil and then winning election as the county's only delegate).

=== Congress ===
He was later elected to the United States House of Representatives, initially as a Jacksonian Democrat and later a Conservative, serving from 1835 to 1841.

=== Later political career ===
After losing a contest for reelection in 1840 to Virginia governor Thomas W. Gilmer, a Whig, Garland moved to Campbell County, Virginia and resumed his legal practice in Lynchburg.

Garland was elected the city's prosecutor and clerk of court in 1841, and served 18 years until removed by Gen. John Schofield during Congressional Reconstruction. In the Presidential election of 1860, he supported Stephen A. Douglas, and when that Democratic candidate lost to Republican Abraham Lincoln, Garland in January 1861 presided over a meeting of conservative citizens who wanted to preserve the Union. He was then elected to the Hustings Court, and Aurelius Christian succeeded him as Commonwealth's attorney.

=== Retirement ===
He retired due to blindness at age 91, after a ceremonial dinner in his honor, and was succeeded by Charles P. Latham.

== Death and legacy ==
After leaving the court (as the Commonwealth's oldest presiding judge), James Garland died in Lynchburg on August 8, 1885, aged 94. The courthouse bell tolled to mark his funeral, and suitable resolutions were recorded.

U.S. House of Representatives
Preceded by William F. Gordon	Member of the U.S. House of Representatives from Virginia's 12th congressional district March 4, 1835 – March 3, 1841 (obsolete district)	Succeeded by Thomas W. Gilmer
