= 1901 Mid Cork by-election =

UK parliamentary by-election

The 1901 Mid Cork by-election was a parliamentary by-election held for the United Kingdom House of Commons constituency of Mid Cork on 17 May 1901. The vacancy arose because of the death of the sitting member, Dr Charles Tanner of the Irish Parliamentary Party.

Various candidates were mooted, including John O'Connor, former MP for South Tipperary. However, the final choice for the Irish Parliamentary Party was D. D. Sheehan, considered as representing the interests of labour. Sheehan was the only candidate nominated, and therefore elected unopposed. Sheehan sat as MP for the constituency until 1918.
