= Mid Cork (UK Parliament constituency) =

UK parliamentary constituency in Ireland, 1885–1922

- Former county constituency for the House of Commons

1885–1922
- Seats: 1
- Created from: County Cork
- Replaced by: Cork Mid, North, South, South East and West

Mid Cork, a division of County Cork, was a parliamentary constituency in Ireland, represented in the Parliament of the United Kingdom. From 1885 to 1922 it returned one Member of Parliament (MP) to the House of Commons of the United Kingdom of Great Britain and Ireland.

Until the 1885 general election the area was part of the County Cork constituency. From 1922, on the establishment of the Irish Free State, it was not represented in the UK Parliament.

== Boundaries ==
This constituency comprised the central part of County Cork, consisting of the baronies of East Muskerry and West Muskerry and that part of the barony of Barretts not contained within the constituency of North East Cork.

== Members of Parliament ==
Election	Member	Party
1885	Charles Kearns Deane Tanner	Irish Parliamentary Party
1891	Charles Kearns Deane Tanner	Irish National Federation
1900	Charles Kearns Deane Tanner	Irish Parliamentary Party
1901 by-election	D. D. Sheehan	Irish Parliamentary Party
1906	D. D. Sheehan	Irish Parliamentary Party
1906 by-election	D. D. Sheehan	Independent Labour
1910 (Jan)	D. D. Sheehan	All-for-Ireland League
1910 (Dec)	D. D. Sheehan	All-for-Ireland League
1918	Terence McSwiney	Sinn Féin
1920	vacant	
1922	constituency abolished	

== Elections ==
=== Elections in the 1880s ===
1885 general election: Mid Cork
Party	Candidate	Votes	%	±%
Irish Parliamentary	Charles Kearns Deane Tanner	5,033	97.9	
Irish Loyal and Patriotic Union	Arthur St George Patton	106	2.1	
Majority		4,927	95.8	
Turnout		5,139	69.4	
Registered electors		7,409		
Irish Parliamentary win (new seat)				

1886 general election: Mid Cork
Party	Candidate	Votes	%	±%
Irish Parliamentary	Charles Kearns Deane Tanner	Unopposed		
Irish Parliamentary hold				

=== Elections in the 1890s ===
1892 general election: Mid Cork
Party	Candidate	Votes	%	±%
Irish National Federation	Charles Kearns Deane Tanner	Unopposed		
Irish National Federation gain from Irish Parliamentary				

1895 general election: Mid Cork
Party	Candidate	Votes	%	±%
Irish National Federation	Charles Kearns Deane Tanner	Unopposed		
Irish National Federation hold				

=== Elections in the 1900s ===
1900 general election: Mid Cork
Party	Candidate	Votes	%	±%
Irish Parliamentary	Charles Kearns Deane Tanner	Unopposed		
Irish Parliamentary hold				

By-election 1901: Mid Cork
Party	Candidate	Votes	%	±%
Irish Parliamentary	D.D. Sheehan	Unopposed		
Irish Parliamentary hold				

1906 general election: Mid Cork
Party	Candidate	Votes	%	±%
Irish Parliamentary	D.D. Sheehan	Unopposed		
Irish Parliamentary hold				

Sheehan was expelled from the IPP on the grounds of being a "factionist" and, in protest and to re-emphasize his public support, he resigned the seat and re-stood as an Independent (Labour) candidate in the resulting by-election.

By-election, 1906: Mid Cork
Party	Candidate	Votes	%	±%
Independent Labour	D.D. Sheehan	Unopposed		
Independent Labour gain from Irish Parliamentary				

=== Elections in the 1910s ===
January 1910 general election: Mid Cork
Party	Candidate	Votes	%	±%
All-for-Ireland	D.D. Sheehan	2,824	58.6	N/A
Irish Parliamentary	William Fallon	1,999	41.4	N/A
Majority		825	17.2	N/A
Turnout		4,823	73.1	N/A
Registered electors		6,599		
All-for-Ireland gain from Independent Labour		Swing	N/A	

December 1910 general election: Mid Cork
Party	Candidate	Votes	%	±%
All-for-Ireland	D.D. Sheehan	2,738	56.4	−2.2
Irish Parliamentary	Timothy Corcoran	2,115	43.6	+2.2
Majority		623	12.8	−4.4
Turnout		4,853	73.5	+0.4
Registered electors		6,599		
All-for-Ireland hold		Swing	−2.2	

1918 general election: Mid Cork
Party	Candidate	Votes	%	±%
Sinn Féin	Terence MacSwiney	Unopposed		
Sinn Féin gain from All-for-Ireland				
