= Jay Gordon =

Jay Gordon may refer to:

- Jay Gordon (blues musician), American blues rock guitarist
- Jay Gordon (physician) (born 1948), American pediatrician, lecturer, and author
- Jay Gordon (singer) (born 1967), American singer
- Jay H. Gordon, (1930–2007), American politician
- Jay Gordon (Ninjago), a character in Ninjago

== See also ==
- James Gordon (disambiguation)
