= James Gordon (botanist) =

James Gordon (1708–1780) was a gardener who became a nurseryman, and later a seed merchant in London, specializing in exotics such as camellias and rhododendrons. He is also credited with the introduction of the American elm, Ulmus americana, in 1752. Appointed gardener to James Sherard at Eltham in 1730, he progressed to Lord Petre's estate at Thorndon Hall, Essex, in 1738 before starting a nursery at Mile End in 1742, later moving to Bow, and establishing a seed shop at the Thistle & Crown, 25 Fenchurch Street. His sons, William, James, and Alexander, assumed control of the nursery in 1776. Although a correspondent of Linnaeus, he never wrote works of his own. "He had more knowledge in vegetation than all the gardeners and writers in England put together, but is too modest to publish anything". He died at Barking, Essex, on 20 December 1780.
