= Jimmy Gordon (footballer, born 1886) =

English footballer

Personal information
- Full name: James Thornton Gordon
- Date of birth: 1886
- Place of birth: Barking, England
- Date of death: 8 December 1959 (aged 72–73)
- Height: 5 ft 11 in (1.80 m)
- Position: Centre-half

Senior career*
Years	Team	Apps	(Gls)
1901–1908	Barking Victoria		
1908	Barking		
1908–1910	West Ham United		
1910–1915	Grimsby Town	126	(7)
- * Club domestic league appearances and goals

James Thornton Gordon (1886 – 8 December 1959) was an English professional footballer who played as a centre-half.
