= James Lindsay Gordon (attorney) =

American lawyer

James L. Gordon

Member of the Virginia Senate for Albemarle and Greene Counties
- In office 1886 – December 3, 1889
- Preceded by: J. Richard Wingfield
- Succeeded by: Thomas M. Dunn

Personal details
- Born: 1858 Albemarle County, Virginia
- Died: November 30, 1904 (aged 45–46) New York City
- Spouse: Martha Hastings Winston
- Parent(s): George Loyall Gordon, Mary Long Daniel
- Relatives: James Lindsay Gordon (uncle); William F. Gordon (grandfather)
- Occupation: lawyer and politician

James Lindsay Gordon (1858-November 30, 1904) was an American lawyer who briefly served in the Virginia Senate and practiced in Virginia and New York City, where he died. He was the grandson of U.S. Congressman William F. Gordon, son of attorney and newspaper editor George Loyall Gordon (who died fighting for the Confederacy at the Battle of Malvern Hill) and nephew of James Lindsay Gordon who served in the Virginia House of Delegates.
