= Cork Constitution (newspaper) =

The name Cork Constitution can refer to two different newspapers that were published in Cork city.

The Cork Advertiser, which was published from 1799 to 1824, called itself the Cork Constitution in 1823.

The Cork Morning Post, which started publication in 1822 and ceased in 1924 renamed itself the Cork Constitution in 1873. In 1892, the newspaper's staff founded the rugby club of the same name, which still exists.

In its second incarnation, the Cork Constitution supported the union of Ireland with Great Britain, was the paper favoured by the Protestant population and patronised by clergymen of the Church of Ireland as well by officers of the British Army who were stationed in the area.

The paper ceased publication shortly after Irish independence.
