= Verville (Merry Point, Virginia) =

Historic house in Virginia, United States

- U.S. National Register of Historic Places
- Virginia Landmarks Register
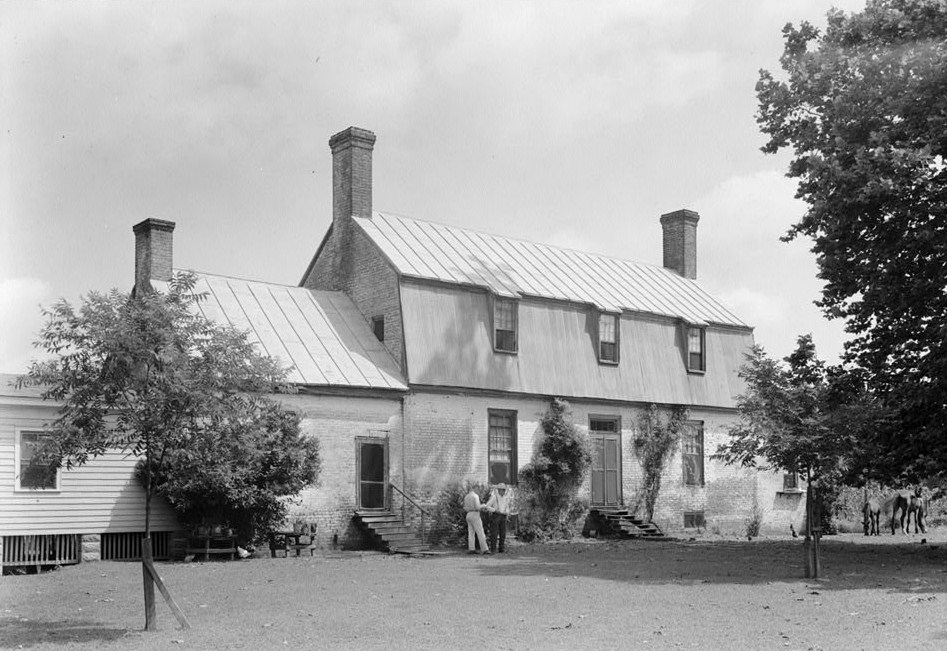
- Verville, HABS Photo

- Location within Virginia Location within the United States
- Location: VA 611, near Merry Point, Virginia
- Coordinates: 37°43′11″N 76°28′40″W
- Area: 5 acres (2.0 ha)
- Built: 1742-1749, 1803-1815
- Architectural style: Colonial, Federal
- NRHP reference No.: 87000609
- VLR No.: 051-0026

Significant dates
- Added to NRHP: April 24, 1987
- Designated VLR: December 9, 1986

Verville is a historic plantation house located near Merry Point, Lancaster County, Virginia. It was built about 1742, and is a 1 1/2-story, brick Colonial-style dwelling. It has a single-pile, central-passage plan. The gambrel roof and all woodwork was changed to conform with Federal-style tastes in the late-18th or early-19th century.

== Early history (Dale/Carter family) ==
In 1668, Major Edward Dale purchased 500 acres (200 ha) of land including a hill that overlooked the confluence of the east and west branches of the Corrotoman River, and in 1674 gave it and one "negro" as a wedding present to his eldest daughter Katherine and her new husband, Capt. Thomas Carter (d. 1700). Carter may have been related to planter Col. John Carter, who came from the same village and who in 1654 financed and sold land to Thomas Carter, who had paid tithes on 4 servants in 1653 and gained additional land in 1657 and 1661 for paying for the transportation of other persons to the colony. Thomas Carter became a local justice of the peace in 1663 and after his marriage built a house on the property, which he called "Barford" after the parish in his family's ancestral home near Kempson in Hertfordshire, England. Katherine Dale Carter survived her husband by three years and bore seven sons. Her husband's will bequeathed her the negro Dick, and allocated his property mostly to his firstborn son Edward (who would die in 1743, and had two sons who survived him but never paid taxes on more than two tithables), then his next three sons: Thomas (who would die in 1733), John (who vanished from local records in 1703) and Henry (who was England when his father died and would himself die in 1743). Thomas became the most financially successful brother (perhaps in part because of his business relationship with distant kinsman Robert Carter I) and purchased 1,023 acres (414 ha) of land in other Northern Neck counties, and his middle brother James moved to Stafford County. Elizabeth Dale Carter's two daughters (Elizabeth and Katherine) and youngest sons Peter and Joseph had received enslaved children or other property from their grandfather Edward Dale.

== Gordon family ==
In 1742 Scots-Irish merchant James Gordon (1714–1768) began purchasing parcels of the Barford plantation, and nearby properties. He also founded the Presbyterian meetinghouse in Lancaster County by 1763, hosted visiting preachers including George Whitefield and Samuel Davies, and kept a diary later published by the College of William & Mary. In 1767, Gordon's daughter Mary married Rev. James Waddel in the mansion and the couple took up residence in the "Honeymoon Cottage" nearby. However, the pioneering Presbyterian Gordon died the following year, leaving a widow, several young children, several stores, 1,500 acres (610 ha) of land, 58 slaves and personal property worth more than 8000 pound sterling.

In 1782 his son James Gordon Sr. (who died in 1790 and by primogeniture had inherited most of his father's estate, accepted responsibility for raising his younger siblings, and became a member of the House of Delegates) purchased the parcel held by Edward Carter, Dale's great-great-great-grandson. At some point one of the Gordons renamed the plantation "Gordonsville", as well as raised the house's walls to add a gambrel roof and modified the interior woodwork to conform the Federal-era tastes. His son James Gordon Jr. also allied with the Revolutionary cause and represented nearby Richmond County, Virginia in the House of Delegates.

== Currie family and modern history ==
In 1803, Col. James Gordon's children sold the property to delegate (and eventually Judge) Ellyson Currie, who renamed the property "Verville," as well as added wings to each side and renovated the flooring and joists. The house remained in the Currie family for 156 years until it was sold in 1959 to Walter and Elizabeth Oliver, who hired noted restorationist Walter Macumber to restore it.

It was listed on the National Register of Historic Places in 1987.
