= James Bentley Gordon =

Irish historian and geographer (1750–1819)

James Bentley Gordon (1750 – 10 April 1819) was an Irish clergyman, and a geographer and historian. He published a history of the Irish Rebellion of 1798, soon after the events.

== Life ==
Gordon was the son of the Rev. James Gordon of Neeve Hall in County Londonderry; he entered Trinity College Dublin in 1768, and graduated B.A. in 1772. On leaving college he was ordained in the Church of Ireland in 1773, and in 1776 became tutor to the sons of Lord Courtown. About 1779 he tried managing a boarding-school at Marlfield in County Wexford, but the enterprise was not successful. In 1796 he was presented to the living of Cannaway in County Cork, and in 1799 to that of Killegney in County Wexford, both of which he retained until his death.

His sight was severely affected by a long illness; he was said to have an awkward and peculiar manner, probably caused by his sight problems. His abilities declined in later years, and he died on 10 April 1819.

== Family ==
He married in 1779 a daughter of Richard Bookey of Wicklow, and they had several children; his eldest son, James George, entered the army, and was killed at Fort Sandusky in Canada on 25 August 1813; another son, Richard Bentley, was prebendary of Ferns and Leighlin from 1819 to 1823; a daughter was married to his biographer, Thomas Jones.

== Works ==
He published:

1. Terraquea, or a New System of Geography and Modern History (1790–1798, 6 volumes). Work on this was interrupted by the Irish Rebellion of 1798.
2. A History of the Rebellion in Ireland in 1798 (1801; 2nd edition, with additions, 1803). His purpose was to give an objective account, and reconcile his countrymen of all backgrounds.
3. A History of Ireland (1805; 2nd edition 1806); translated into French in 1808.
4. A History of the British Islands from the earliest Accounts to the Present Time (1815).

Gordon also left copious manuscripts, chiefly in continuation of his Terraquea, of which a portion was printed in 1820 as An Historical and Geographical Memoir of the North American Continent. With a Summary Account of Gordon's Life, Writings, and Opinions, by T. Jones. Another work left in manuscript was An Historical Memoir of the Church of Ireland; a summary of this is given in Jones's Account.
