= Merry Point, Virginia =

Unincorporated community in Virginia, United States

- Unincorporated community
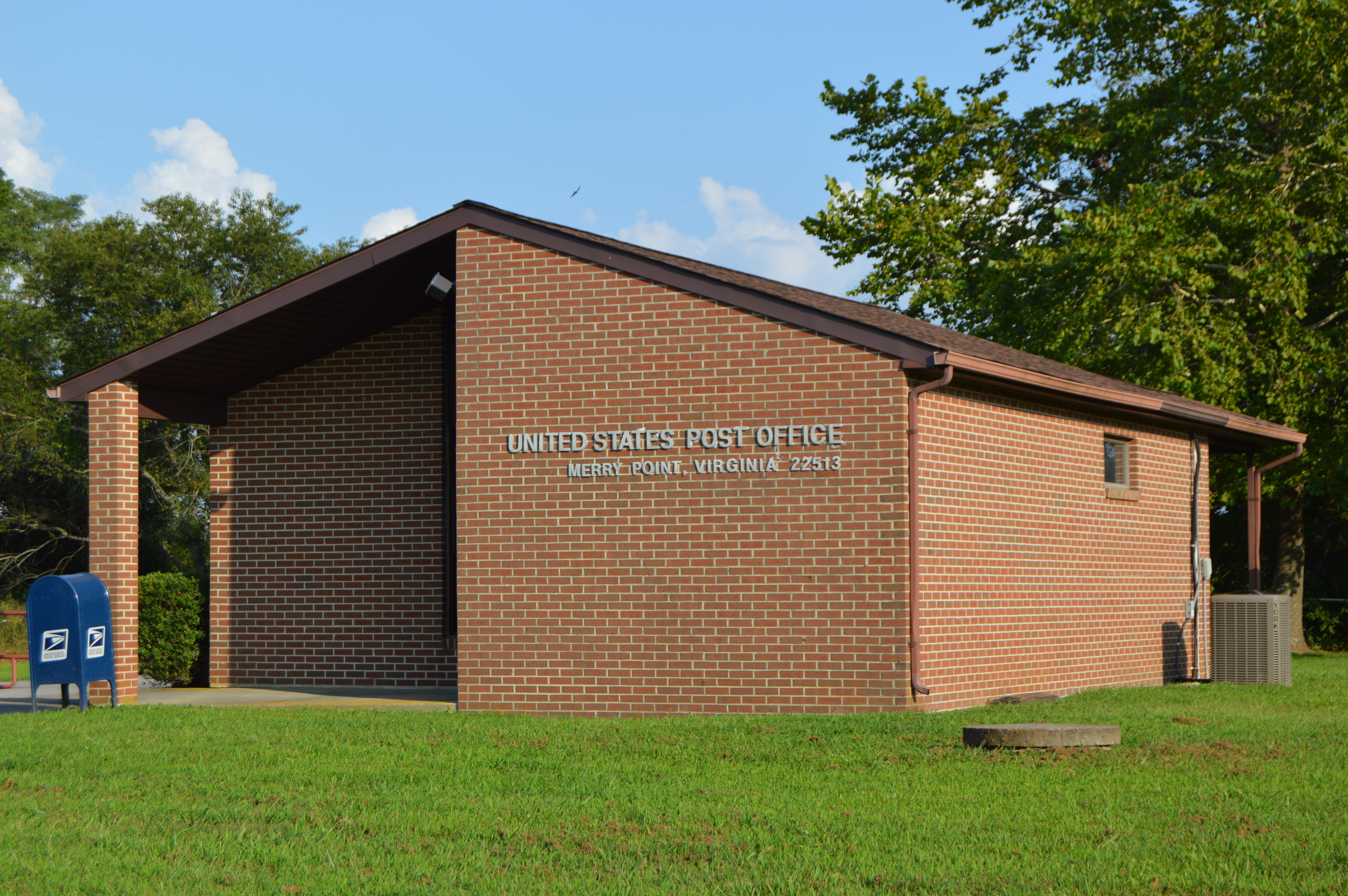
- Post office

- Location in Virginia Location in the United States
- Coordinates: 37°44′02″N 76°28′57″W
- Country: United States
- State: Virginia
- County: Lancaster
- Time zone: UTC−5 (Eastern (EST))
  - Summer (DST): UTC−4 (EDT)

Merry Point is an unincorporated community in Lancaster County in the U. S. state of Virginia.

Verville, a historic plantation house built c. 1742, was listed on the National Register of Historic Places in 1987.
