= Canovee =

Village in County Cork, Ireland

- Location in Ireland
- Coordinates: 51.8892°N 8.8553°W
- Country: Ireland
- Province: Munster
- County: County Cork
- Time zone: UTC+0 (WET)
  - Summer (DST): UTC-1 (IST (WEST))

Canovee (Irish: Ceannmhaí) is a rural region, with a village nucleus, in the Lee valley in County Cork, Ireland. The toponym 'Canovee' is synonymous with the official version 'Cannaway' (as in the civil parish of Cannaway), and the electoral division of Cannaway.

== Geography ==
=== "Island" of Canavoy ===
Canovee has sometimes been referred to as an 'island', because most of the civil parish's boundaries are formed by bodies of water. For example, the River Lee constituting its north-eastern, northern and north-western borders, the Kame River and one of its tributaries lie to the east, and the Aghthying Stream is to the west.

=== Civil parish ===
The civil parish of Cannaway corresponds to the 'Island of Canavoy'. Civil parishes were ecclesiastical units of territory based on Gaelic tuatha, or early Christian and monastic settlements from the 12th century. They were later adopted by the Church of Ireland, and subsequently became civil administrative areas.

The official names of the constituent townlands of the civil parish of Cannaway, as per the Placenames (County Cork) Order 2012 include:

- Bawnatemple- Bán an Teampaill
- Classes- Na Clasa Fada
- Cooldrum- Cúldrom
- Coolnacarriga- Cúil na Carraige
- Coolnashamroge- Cúil na Seamróg
- Coolnasoon Cúil na Suan
- Killinardrish Cill an Ard-dorais
- Knockavullig- Cnoc an Mhullaigh
- Lehenagh- Leitheanach
- Loughleigh; An Loch Liath
- Mahallagh- Maigh Shalach
- Monallig- Maigh nDealg
- Nettleville Demesne- Nettleville
- Rathonoane- Ráth Ó nDúbháin
- Shandangan East- An Seandaingean Thoir
- Shandangan West- An Seandaingean Thiar

=== Electoral division ===
The electoral division of Cannaway, number 18201, includes the 16 townlands of the civil parish of Cannaway, as well as Rooves Beg (An Rú Beag), which is a constituent townland of the neighbouring civil parish of Aglish.

== Demographics ==
As per the CSO, the population of the Cannaway Electoral Division (21.6km2) in 2011 was 595, with 293 males and 302 females. There was an increase of 13.8% since 2006.

== History ==
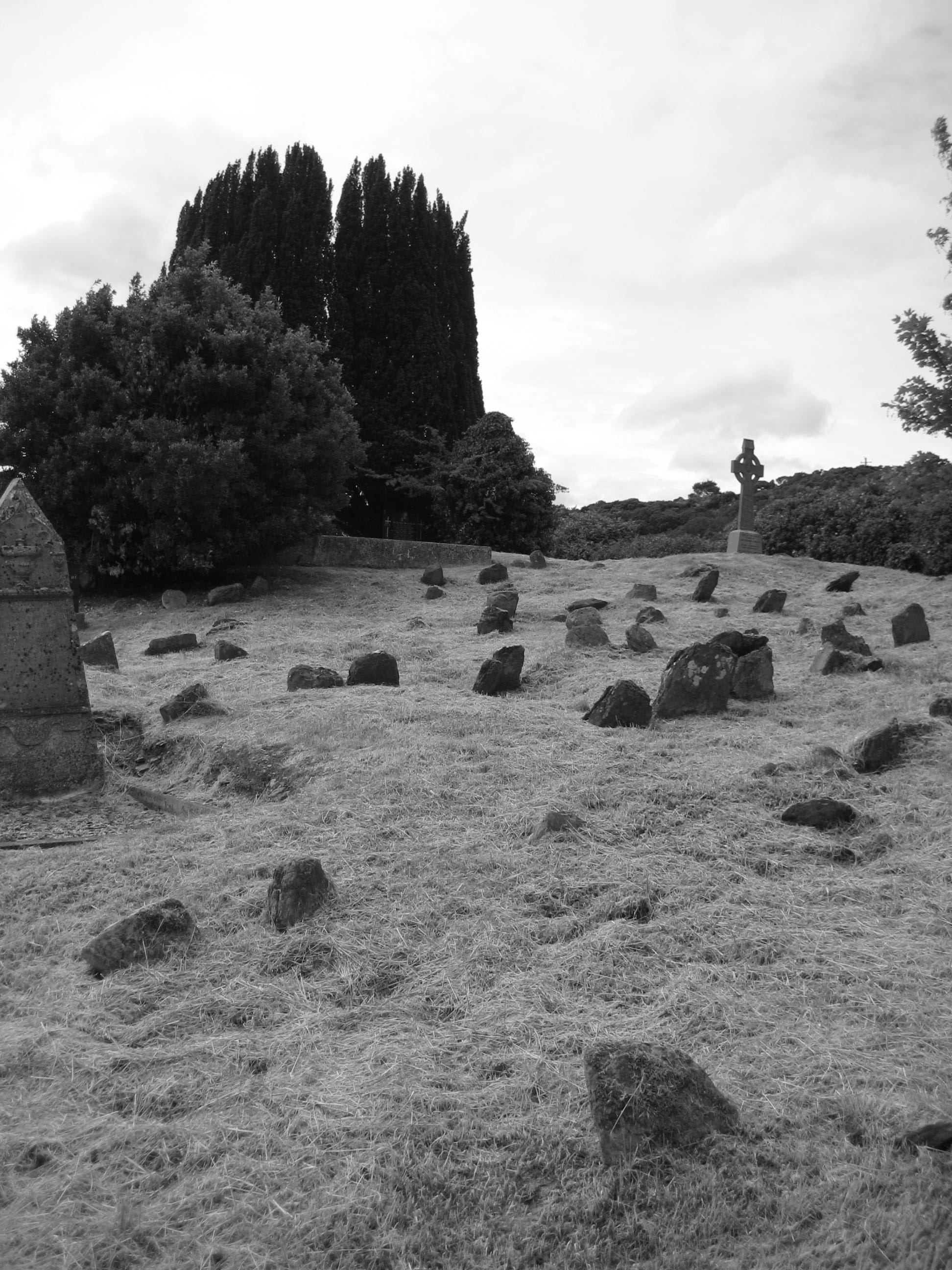
Cannaway cemetery

=== 17th century ===
==== Civil Survey Of The Barony Of Muskerry (1656) ====
The Civil Survey of 1656 was a cadastral survey of landholdings in Ireland by the Cromwellian administration, showing proprietors and property as they stood at the outbreak of the Irish Rebellion of 1641. It was organised by parish, barony and county and identified proprietors by religion, in preparation for redistribution of forfeited estates to establish a new social and political order in Ireland.

Canavoy Parish, consisting of 'ten Plowlands and an half' is said to be "mear'd & bounded on the East with the Parish of Aglish, and distinguish'd from it by a small Brook running into the River Lee, on the South with the Parish of Moviddy, on West with the Parish of Kilmurry, and on the North West, & North with the River Lee, the said Parish is in Length from Carrigadrohid on the North, to the little ford call'd Ahanaboy on the South two Miles & in Breadth from the Lands of Rooves on the East, to the Lands of Ballytrasny in the West one Mile & half. For the Generality of the Soyl it's Cold and Indifferent good for tillage, if Manur'd with Lyme or sea sand, which lyeth remote from it. Here are some Timber Wood & Coppices...

Here is the Parochial Church of the said Parish, standing about the bottom of the said Island of Canavoy near the River Lee. Nothing remains thereof but ye Walls, And on the North side near the same standeth the Walls of a large Ancient House, Which belongeth to the Chief Proprietor of the said Island, being the Famely of the Longs."

- Modern-day Lehenagh: The proprietor of Lehanah/ Lehanagh- which was by estimation one plowland or 214 acres- was one John Long of Mount Long, Irish Papist (deceased). There was an old house on the premises. Lehanah was valued at £24.
- Modern-day Cooldrum, Coolnacarriga, Classis & Coolnasoon: John Long/ O Long was also the proprietor of Cooldram, Coolenacarrigy/ Coolenicarrigy, Clasfaddy and Coolnasoon/ Coorenasoone/ Coornasoon- approximately two plowlands, or 472 acres. On the premises were about three small thatched houses. These townlands were valued at £53.
- Modern-day Monallig & Killinardrish: John Long was cited as the proprietor of Mannollig, Inishmore and Killanardorish/ Killanardoris- approximately one and a half plowlands, or 327 acres. A Grist Mill, worth £5 sterling and 'some small Cabbins' near Carrigadrohid not Valuable'. These townlands were valued at £60.
- Modern-day Mahallagh, Loughleigh & Nettleville Demesne: Mahallagh/ Mahallogh/ Mohallagh/ Mahollagh- two plowlands, or 441 acres approximately- belonged to the Lord Of Muskery, Irish Papist. There was a thatched house and garden valued at £5 and 'some Cabbins not Valuable'. There was Timber wood fit for all uses valued at £100 in Mahallagh, and the townland itself was valued at £50.
- Modern-day Rathonoane & Knockavullig: Rathonoane/ Rathonuane and Knockavollig belonged to the Lord of Muskery, Irish Papist, had a 'decay'd Thatch'd house & some Cabbins not Valuable'. Estimated as one and a half plowlands, or 497 acres, and valued at £50.
- Modern-day Coolnashamroge: Coolenashamroge/ Coolnashamroge, half a plowland or approximately 100 acres, belonged to Pierce Gould of Corke, deceased merchant and Irish Papist. Valued at £12.
- Modern-day Shandangan: Shandangen/ Shandangan belonged to Derm'd McTeige Carthy of Inshyrahill (Inchirahilly), deceased Irish Papist. Estimated to be two plowlands or approximately 617 acres. Valued at £48. There was an old ruinous thatched house, not valuable on the premises.
- Church Land- the 'Gleab of this Parish', was described as being surrounded on all sides with the land of Coolnacarrigy, being approximately 6 acres in size and being worth three and four pence.
- In Rooves (Rooves More and Rooves Beg- a constituent of the modern Electoral Division of Cannaway) were a grist mill, valued at £4 sterling, and a tucking mill, valued at £2 sterling.

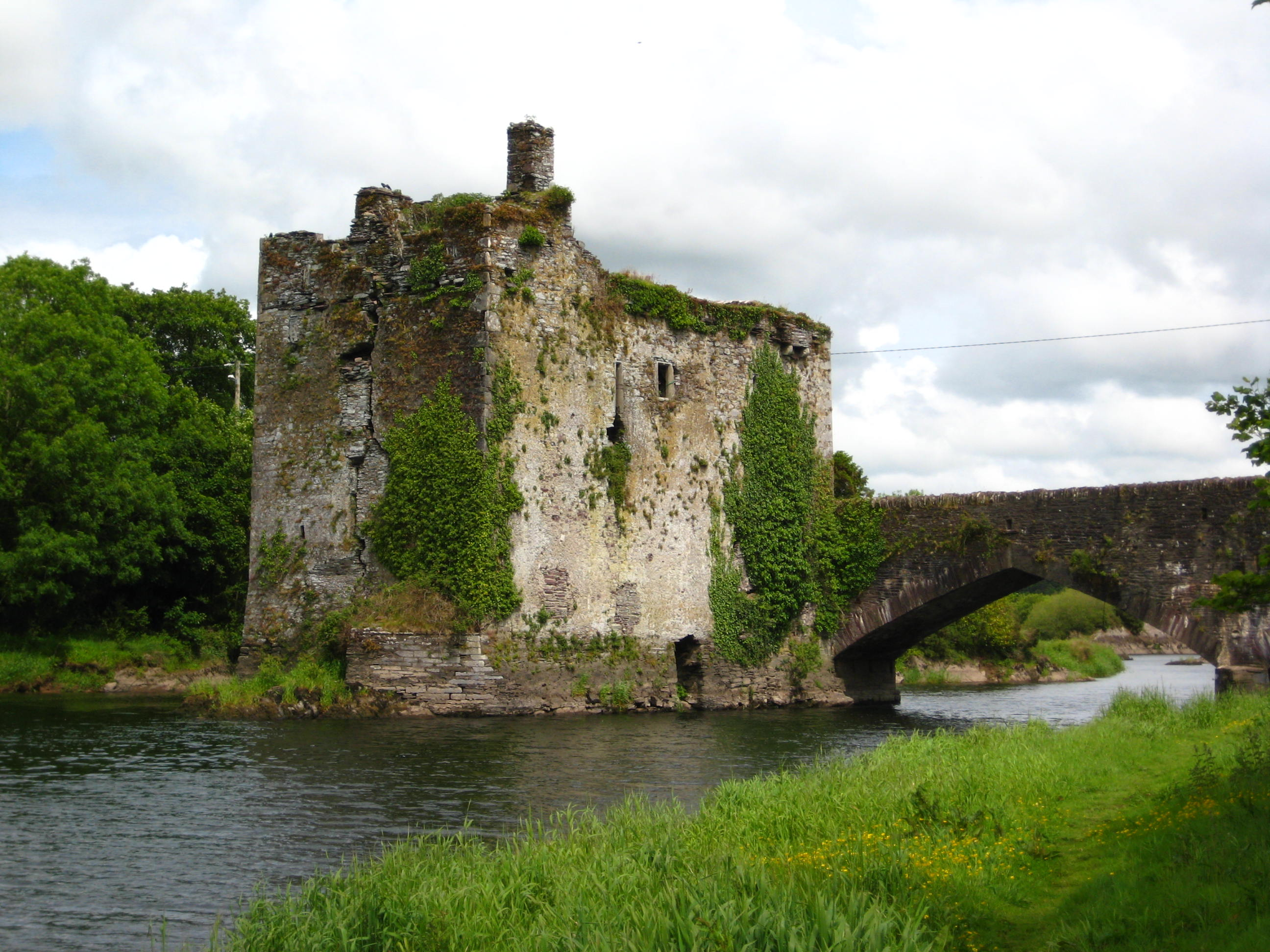
Carrigadrohid castle

To the north in the neighbouring village of Carrigadrohid, the castle 'Situated on a rock in the midst of the River Lee' was valued at £100, the bridge across the Lee was made of timber and although out of repair, was passable on foot. There were six small houses and Cabbins and gardens- not valuable.

=== 18th century ===
==== Compleat Irish Traveller- 'Irish Traveller' (1788) ====
"At Mahallagh, five miles east from Macroomp, is a pleasant seat on the south bank of the Lee. Four miles east by south from Macroomp, in the parish of Canaboy, is a pleasant seat, graced with an handsome house, good gardens, large orchards, fish ponds, and a great number of trees planted. In the same parish is Shandangan, a mile south- west of the former, another pretty seat; the gardens lie to the west of the house, and are formed out of a drained bog, which is now cut into pleasant ponds; here are good orchards, and a deer park."

=== 19th century ===
==== Topographical Dictionary Of Ireland (1810) N. Carlisle ====
Connoway, or Canaboy, in the Barony of Muskerry, County Cork is mentioned. It is described as having neither church, nor Glebe House. In 1806, the vicar was one James Bentley Gordon, who resided in the Diocese of Ferns and 'occasional duties' were performed by a curate residing in an adjoining parish 'at a salary of 10'.

==== Topographical Dictionary of Great Britain and Ireland (1833) John Gorton ====
The parish of Cannaway, or Canaboy, in the barony of Muskerry upon the River Lee in County Cork was named as one of the five Established Church parishes that constituted the Union of Killaspugmullane. The population was 1470 and the parish had an annual value of £230.

==== Longs ====
In M.C. O'Laughlin's Families Of County Cork, Ireland, the Longs are mentioned as having been erenaghs for Cannaway, or Canovee. The author goes on to mention that in the Civil Survey of the 1650s, the Longs are given as proprietors of Cannaway Island, and the remains of a large house of theirs was found on the north side of the River Lee.
