= James Lindsay Gordon =

American lawyer (1813–1877)

James L. Gordon

Member of the Virginia House of Delegates for Louisa County
- In office December 2, 1844 – December 6, 1846
- Preceded by: William Jackson
- Succeeded by: John Poindexter Jr.

Personal details
- Born: October 13, 1813 Albemarle County, Virginia, U.S.
- Died: December 7, 1877 (aged 64) Louisa County, Virginia, U.S.
- Spouse: Martha Hastings Winston
- Parent: William F. Gordon (father)
- Occupation: lawyer and politician

James L. Gordon (October 13, 1813 – December 7, 1877) was a Virginia lawyer and politician in Louisa County who served two terms in the Virginia House of Delegates. He was the son of Elizabeth Lindsay and U.S. Congressman William F. Gordon, who served in both houses of the Virginia General Assembly and operated plantations using enslaved labor.
