= James Gordon Sr. =

American politician (1750–1796)

Member of the Virginia House of Delegates for Lancaster County
- In office October 16, 1786 – October 1787 Serving with Cyrus Griffin
- Preceded by: James Ball, Jr.
- Succeeded by: James Wallace Ball
- In office October 7, 1776 – May 3, 1778 Serving with Jesse Ball, Cyrus Griffin
- Preceded by: position created
- Succeeded by: John Selden

Personal details
- Born: August 2, 1750 Lancaster County, Colony of Virginia
- Died: September 29, 1796 (aged 46) Lancaster County, Virginia
- Spouse: Diana Skipwith Dale
- Occupation: planter, government official and politician

James Gordon Sr. (August 2, 1750 – September 29, 1796) was a planter, military officer and politician in Lancaster County, Virginia. The son of a Scots-Irish merchant who emigrated to Virginia's Northern Neck, he became one of Lancaster County's representatives at the convention that wrote the first Virginia constitution in 1776, as well as the first Virginia House of Delegates, and supported ratification at the Virginia Ratification Convention of 1788. His daughter married his nephew, who became known as James Gordon, Jr. and also served in the Virginia House of Delegates as well as voted for ratification at the 1788 Virginia Convention. He inherited a plantation which he called Gordonville and operated using enslaved labor, but which his heirs sold to a family who renamed it Verville, which is now on the National Register of Historic Places.
