= List of airports in the Republic of Ireland =

Locations of Irish airports with commercial airline services. Bold indicates international airports.

This is a list of airports, airfields and aerodromes in the Republic of Ireland, grouped by type and sorted by location. For those marked *, the link is to an article on the locale, rather than just the airport or aerodrome.

== Airports ==
Airport names shown in bold indicate the airport has scheduled service on commercial airlines.

City or area served / location	County	Province	ICAO	IATA	Airport name	Rwy Length		Notes
City or area served / location	County	Province	ICAO	IATA	Airport name	(m)	(ft)	Notes
Cork	County Cork	Munster	EICK	ORK	**Cork Airport**	2,133	6,998	
Northwest of Ireland / Dungloe	County Donegal	Ulster	EIDL	CFN	**Donegal Airport**	1,496	4,908	
Dublin	Fingal	Leinster	EIDW	DUB	**Dublin Airport**	3,110	10,203	
Dublin / Leixlip	South Dublin / County Kildare	Leinster	EIWT		Weston Airport	924	3,030	
Galway / Carnmore	County Galway	Connacht	EICM	GWY	Galway Airport	1,289	4,230	
Southwest of Ireland / Farranfore	County Kerry	Munster	EIKY	KIR	**Kerry Airport** (Farranfore Airport)	2,000	6,562	
County Mayo and near / Charlestown near Knock	County Mayo	Connacht	EIKN	NOC	**Ireland West Airport**	2,340	7,700	
County Clare, County Limerick and near / Shannon Town	County Clare	Munster	EINN	SNN	**Shannon Airport**	3,199	10,495	
Strandhill	County Sligo	Connacht	EISG	SXL	Sligo Airport	1,199	3,933	
Waterford	County Waterford	Munster	EIWF	WAT	Waterford Airport	1,433	4,701	
**Licensed aerodromes**								
Abbeyshrule	County Longford	Leinster	EIAB		Abbeyshrule Aerodrome	620	2,000	
Athboy (Baile Átha Buí)	County Meath	Leinster	EIMH		Athboy Aerodrome	600	1,968	
Bantry	County Cork	Munster	EIBN	BYT	Bantry Aerodrome	390	1,280	Owned by a pharmaceutical company
Belmullet	County Mayo	Connacht	EIBT	BLY	Belmullet Aerodrome	450	1,476	
Birr	County Offaly	Leinster	EIBR		Birr Aerodrome	570	1,870	
Clonbullogue	County Offaly	Leinster	EICL		Clonbullogue Aerodrome	770	2,526	Base of the Irish Parachute Club
Connemara / Inverin	County Galway	Connacht	EICA	NNR	**Connemara Airport** (Minna Airport)	600	1,969	
Coonagh / Limerick	County Limerick	Munster	EICN		Coonagh Aerodrome	416	1,365	
Inisheer (Inis Oírr)	County Galway	Connacht	EIIR	INQ	**Inisheer Aerodrome**	520	1,706	
Inishmaan (Inis Meáin)	County Galway	Connacht	EIMN	IIA	**Inishmaan Aerodrome**	534	1,752	
Inishmore (Inis Mór)	County Galway	Connacht	EIIM	IOR	**Inishmore Aerodrome**	490	1,608	
Kildare / Kilrush	County Kildare	Leinster	EIKH		Kilrush Aerodrome			
Kilkenny	County Kilkenny	Leinster	EIKK	KKY	Kilkenny Airport	930	3,051	
Nenagh / Capperoe	County Tipperary	Munster	EIER		Erinagh Aerodrome			
Newcastle	County Wicklow	Leinster	EINC		Newcastle Aerodrome	690	2,264	
Rathcoole Aerodrome, Mallow	County Cork	Munster	EIRT		Rathcoole Aerodrome	450	1,476	
Trevet Farm, Dunshaughlin	County Meath	Leinster	EITT		Trevet Aerodrome			
Trim	County Meath	Leinster	EITM		Trim Aerodrome	560	1,837	
**Other airfields**								
Abbeyfeale	County Limerick	Munster			Abbeyfeale Aerodrome	690	2,264	
Trim	County Meath	Leinster			Trim Airfield			
Ardagh, County Limerick	County Limerick	Munster			Ardagh Airfield			
Ballyboughal	Fingal	Leinster	EIBB		Ballyboughal Airfield*			
Brittas, County Limerick	County Limerick	Munster			Brittas House Airstrip			
Hacketstown	County Carlow	Leinster	EIHN		Hacketstown Airfield			
Kilcock / Maynooth	County Kildare	Leinster	EIMY		Moyglare Airfield			
Killenaule	County Tipperary	Munster	EIKI		Killenaule Airfield			
Letterkenny	County Donegal	Ulster	EILT	LTR	Letterkenny Airfield			
Naas	County Kildare	Leinster	EIGN		Gowran Grange Airfield	472	1,548	
Powerscourt Estate / Enniskerry	County Wicklow	Leinster	EIPT		Powerscourt Airfield			
Spanish Point	County Clare	Munster	EISP		Spanish Point Airfield			
Thurles	County Tipperary	Munster	EIMY		Moyne Aerodrome	355	1,165	
**Military**								
Bundoran	County Donegal	Ulster	EIFR		Finner Camp (heliport)			
Baldonnel	South Dublin	Leinster	EIME		Casement Aerodrome (Baldonnel Aerodrome)	1,829	6,001	
**Closed**								
Brittas Bay	County Wicklow	Leinster	EIBB		Brittas Bay Airfield			
Castlebar	County Mayo	Connacht	EICB	CLB	Castlebar Airfield			
Castleforbes	County Longford	Leinster	EICS		Castleforbes Airfield			
Dundalk	County Louth	Leinster			Dundalk Aerodrome			
Dunmore East	County Waterford	Leinster			Dunmore East Aerodrome			
Fethard	County Tipperary	Munster	EIFT		Fethard Airstrip*	490	1,376	
Gormanston	County Meath	Leinster	EIGM		Gormanston Aerodrome (closed 2002)			
Inishbofin	County Galway	Connacht	EIIB		Inishbofin Airport	563.3	1,848	Unused
Kells / Headfort House	County Meath	Leinster			Headfort Aerodrome			
Killarney	County Kerry	Munster			Killarney (Race Course) Airfield			
Moneygall	County Offaly	Leinster	EIMG		Moneygall Aerodrome*			
Oranmore	County Galway	Connacht			Oranmore Aerodrome*			
Tallaght	County Dublin	Leinster			Tallaght Aerodrome			
Wicklow / Glenealy	County Wicklow	Leinster			Ballyfree Aerodrome			

== See also ==
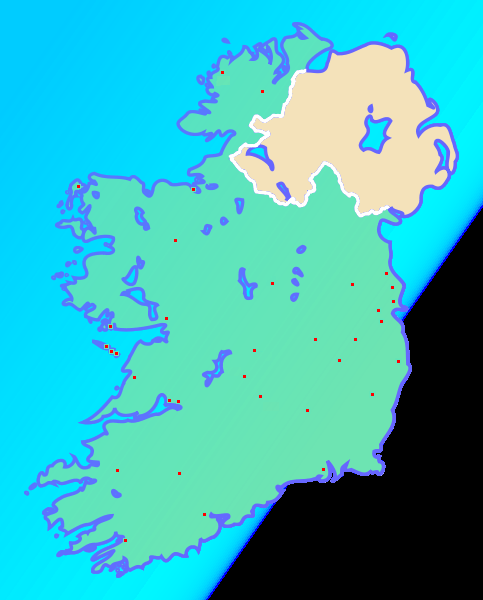
Irish airports and aerodromes

- Irish Aviation Authority
- Transport in Ireland
- List of airports by ICAO code: EH-EY#EI - Ireland
- List of airports in Northern Ireland
