= Coonagh =

Coonagh may refer to

- Coonagh, Limerick City, bordering County Clare
  - Coonagh Aerodrome
- Coonagh (barony), County Limerick, bordering County Tipperary
