= Rathcoole =

Rathcoole may refer to several things on the island of Ireland:

- Rathcoole, County Dublin, a village on the outskirts of Dublin city
- Rathcoole (Newtownabbey), County Antrim, a large housing estate
  - Rathcoole F.C., a football club in Newtownabbey
- Rathcoole, County Cork, a village
  - Rathcoole Aerodrome, by the County Cork village
- Rathcoole, County Kilkenny, a parish
