= Coonagh, Limerick City =

Area of the city of Limerick, Ireland

Coonagh Cuanach
- Suburb
- Location in Ireland
- Coordinates: 52°40′01″N 8°41′20″W
- Country: Ireland
- Province: Munster
- County: County Limerick
- Time zone: UTC+0 (WET)
  - Summer (DST): UTC-1 (IST (WEST))
- Irish Grid Reference: R531575

Coonagh (Irish: Cuanach, meaning 'winding, abounding in hollows, estuary') is an area, comprising the townlands of:

- Coonagh West (a.k.a. "Upper Coonagh", "the village", or "Faha", typically meaning "exercise green" in Irish)
- Coonagh East (a.k.a. "Lower Coonagh")

Coonagh is situated in County Limerick, Ireland, on the banks of the River Shannon near the border with County Clare. A 2008 boundary extension resulted in its inclusion within Limerick city. It is part of the Catholic parish Parteen-Meelick-Coonagh in the diocese of Limerick, with several generations of Coonagh families having attended Meelick National School (Scoil Mhuire Miliuc), County Clare. In 1111 AD, Parteen, Meelick and Coonagh were assigned to the Diocese of Limerick at the Synod of Ráth Breasail when the boundaries of the dioceses were drawn up.

The Tithe Applotments of County Clare also indicate that Coonagh was part of the parish of Killeely in 1833.

== History ==
=== Archaeology ===
Excavations conducted prior to commencement of building the Limerick Southern Ring Road and Limerick Tunnel uncovered items such as penannular ring pins, and several post-medieval brick-making kilns. Also recovered were a copper-alloy stick pin, a needle, two saddle querns, burnt stone deposits, and very high quantities of animal bone (including worked antler handles, horn cores, and spindle whorls, indicating textile making), alder wood charcoal, and charred hazelnut shells. The largest site uncovered was an Early Christian ditched enclosure at Coonagh West with a diameter of 40m that exploited a glacial drumlin, including a series of shallow gullies and oak post holes both internal and external to the enclosure, indicative of houses having been present dating back to the 16th century BC, a 27m trackway that enabled access to and from the river, pits, a hearth, as well as some pottery. Archaeologists suggested that it may have been a type of ringfort that exploited a dry gravel mound in a predominantly wet and marginal landscape.

One site in Coonagh indicated evidence for human occupation in the Mesolithic, Neolithic, and Bronze Age periods. Six stone axeheads, a blade, a knife, arrowheads, and scrapers were uncovered. There was also evidence of charred cereal, and findings that cattle, sheep/goat, and pig were kept and eaten. The houses at Coonagh West 4 appear to be the earliest settlement, producing radiocarbon dates of 1745-1541 BC. There is also evidence of stone troughs, with one in particular indicating that the opening of a natural spring was enlarged and lined with stones through which water could percolate. Some may also have served as boiling pits. A forked branch that had been cut using an axe was also found, which may have been used as a spit. Soil samples from one of the troughs found in Coonagh indicate non-local soil samples rich in minerals, that could have been used in dyeing, or tanning and cleaning animal skins.

Iron Age activity was revealed in the Eastern end of the excavation area, including the base of a small metal-working furnace cut into the gravel, and the fragment of a crucible (a vessel in which metal was melted before being poured into a mould). Analysis of the crucible indicate it was possibly used to manufacture 'leaded gunmetal', a copper and lead alloy. A possible whistle, or part of a set of pipes that were found, evokes images of social occasions and entertainment at the site. Age/slaughter patterns of animal remains found at the site indicate that the demand for meat took precedence over the demand for milk and other live animal products.

Overall, the evidence shows that Coonagh was populated from Mesolithic Stone Age times through the Bronze and Iron Ages to modern day.

In addition, while determining the history of the embankments along the Shannon, the excavation indicated that the reclaimed salt marshes south of Coonagh Point had only been reclaimed from the Shannon as recently as the 1820s.

The Civil Survey of 1654 records that there were two fishing weirs on the Shannon in Coonagh, owned by the Earl of Thomond and Sir Nichollas Comyne. These weirs were probably those rented by John Darcy in 1678 for two shillings a year. The lease - which was to expire in 1739 - was for a 'flood weir and ebb weir belonging to Coonagh'.

=== Traditional jobs ===
Coonagh's residents traditionally made their living from the nearby Shannon River by drift-net fishing for salmon in gandelow boats, cutting reed that grows along the Shannon for sale as thatch, brick making, and farming.

==== Brick making ====
Coonagh men would harvest clay from the "brick holes" in Coonagh West. Coonagh brick was used in the building of many Georgian red brick buildings in Limerick City, including Patrick Street in Limerick, presumably in the houses on Arthur's Quay, which were constructed by Frances Arthur between 1771 and 1791, as well as Newtown Pery. The brick was transported by river from Coonagh to Limerick City Docks. The Ordnance Survey Map of 1844 highlights brick manufacturing areas, as well as brick clamps that were excavated at Coonagh West, and the quay from which bricks were shipped. In 1901, only one brick-maker was named in the Census for Coonagh East and West, and by the 1930s, local brick making had ceased completely.

Bricks from Coonagh were hand-made and fired in temporary structures called brick clamps. Water and turf (to aid combustion) were added to the clay and the mixture was worked with the bare feet of the brick-makers. The clay was then shaped by hand in wooden moulds and afterwards, unfired or 'green bricks' were allowed to dry on straw or in long rows of stacked bricks called 'hacks', with the straw imprint on the brick being a trademark of Coonagh brick. Mineralogical analyses of Coonagh brick indicate it was fired at a temperature ranging from 500 °C to 1000 °C. It is not known when brick making in Coonagh first started, but it is said that Coonagh bricks were used in Limerick City from at least the 18th century.

==== Reed cutting ====
Coonagh men used sickles to cut reed that grows along the shore of the Shannon Estuary to sell as thatch, which was gathered into sheaves. After the dredging of Meelick and Cratloe Creeks in the 1960s, the sheaves were transported by gandelow to nearby Lansdowne Bridge or Sandy Bridge, where it was then loaded onto lorries for distribution. Prior to this, local farmers originally bought the reed as they were the only ones with access to the river through their own lands, either via horse and cart or later tractor and trailer. The reeds were typically used as roofing for "story and a half" thatched cottages in Coonagh and further afield, which usually consisted of a downstairs living room/kitchen with one or sometimes two rooms located off it, and a single room upstairs, similar to those that can be found in Adare and Bunratty Folk Park. The last thatched cottage in Coonagh, until recently maintained and re-thatched frequently by its owner, the late Coonagh farmer James "Jimmy" Hickey, has fallen into disrepair with his passing in March 2008.

==== Salmon fishing and gandelow racing ====
Coonagh men continued to fish and cut thatch until recently, but these traditions are slowly fading away due to the introduction of an outright ban on drift-net fishing on the Shannon in 2006, which Coonagh fishermen protested against, and the decline in demand for thatched roofing. However, gandelow racing (a tradition on the Shannon dating as far back as 1864, if not further) is still featured as part of Limerick's annual Riverfest festival, with Coonagh crews taking part each year and often winning. Crews from Coonagh have had victories in rowing in the Currach League, four Ocean to City titles in Cork, and two Barcelona regattas. Their greatest victory was the International Great River Race on the Thames in 2008. The race is 22 miles long with 300 boats participating. The three fishermen in that crew were Thomas Davis, Robert Kenny, and Mike Grimes, whose families have fished the Shannon from Coonagh for generations.

Traditional gandelows can still be seen moored on the banks of the Shannon in Coonagh West, near the toll gates north-west of the Limerick Tunnel on the M7 motorway that now passes through the area, as well as fishing cabins where the fishermen would keep their nets, oars, and other equipment. Gandelows continued to be made by hand in Coonagh until the 2006 fishing ban. As an acknowledgement of Coonagh's heritage, the emblem of Coonagh Utd. A.F.C. contains a salmon leaping from the Shannon.

The fishing season would officially open on 1 February and continue to July, although it was not unusual for some households to dine on salmon instead of turkey on Christmas day. Three-man crews were the norm for Spring fishing because they were more likely to encounter severe gales and storms on the Shannon. During severe weather, two men would row the boat, keeping her head into the wind and swells. The third man would pay out and haul the 150-yard long net. In milder weather, a two-man crew was sufficient, with one man rowing and the other hauling net. Coonagh fishermen had excellent knowledge of the estuary, knowing where every rock and snag was to avoid damaging their nets, especially at low tide. The estuary was divided into drifts from Coonagh Point to the mouth of the Fergus, and were fished one boat on a drift at a time.

The best salmon seasons in Coonagh were probably the 1970s, when some crews had catches of up to 100 salmon after a long day's fishing. Rene Cusack was the main fish buyer at that time, with fish being taken to O'Halloran's shop in Upper Coonagh to be weighed by the proprietors, Bessie or Josie Holloran, on their old-style weighing scale and rounded to the nearest half-pound weight. The fish were then wrapped in newspaper and sold to the customer.

=== History of flooding ===
The Down Survey of 1654–1656 (National Archives) shows land on the north bank of the Shannon as 'pasture overflowen [sic] every tide'. The embankments appear not to have fared well and in 1808, their poor condition and failure to resist floods of Spring tides was lamented by Dutton (1808, 225) in his Statistical Survey of the County of Clare:

"Nothing can possibly be worse than the embankments along the Shannon and Fergus to keep out flood-water....as no proper person is appointed... to superintend them, it often happens, that, from the indolence or ignorance of one proprietor, the property of many others is greatly injured; when a breach is made, it is so badly repaired, that it probably stands but a very short time."

Royal Navy mapping of the upper Shannon estuary in 1839 labelled these embankments as 'Old Embankment' and shows the river's main channel and wide floodplain. Dutton's words may have hit home, because sometime between 1824 and 1828, Eugene O'Curry was employed as overseer during the erection of a new embankment at Coonagh. This was not adequate however, as in 1843 it was observed that the river flats are still often overflowed by the Shannon; and along the high road that traverses them, stone pillars were raised at frequent intervals as indexes of its limits on such occasions. The embankments were successful, at least in part, as they did enable the earlier 18th-century Ennis to Limerick road to move from the higher ground of the Cratloe Hills to a lower position in the alluvial flats, which stretch from the shores of the river to the base of the highlands, which rise behind the woods of Cratloe, as shown in Taylor and Skinner's map in the 1780s.

In October 1961, the River Shannon again burst its banks, flooding almost all of Coonagh as far as the current site of the Coonagh Roundabout, causing much damage to homes, with many having to be temporarily abandoned. In places, the water rose to 5m high, and Coonagh once again became an island for a short time. Children had to be ferried out of Coonagh in gandelows to attend school. To prevent future flooding, higher banks were erected along the Shannon using mud and clay from the brick holes in Coonagh, and the N18 dual-carriageway now runs parallel with, and over, these embankments. Due to the floodwaters spreading fertile silt from the Shannon onto agricultural land, for many years after the flood Coonagh was a renowned spot for picking wild mushrooms.

=== Coast Guard station and riots of 1848 ===
According to papers preserved by University of Southampton Library's Digitisation Unit, Coonagh was in the mid-1800s home to a Coast Guard Station. In a documented report that references the Coast Guard station at Coonagh on 23 June 1848 and mentions the location of Coonagh as a "few miles below Limerick", a Captain Montagu Pasco, Royal Navy, Inspecting Commander, describes the events of the previous day outlining a riot on the Shannon while he was stationed at the Cooonagh Coast Guard Station. In his report, he indicates that 300–400 cot fishermen proceeded down river, destroying all the salmon weirs between the Coast Guard Station in Coonagh and Grass Island (at the eastern entrance to the Maigue River), with the exception of two or three that he managed to protect. He mentions that only for the intervention of the Royal Navy at Green's Island (located near a creek that runs to Bunratty Castle), the police would have been hurt as the fishermen chased them through the mud. He mentions that there was no breach of the peace, however, apart from the cutting of the weirs, but that the proprietors of the weirs knew all the men involved and so would be able to prosecute. He goes on to mention that he decided not to use his arms, as he could only do so if required for self-defence.

=== Military history: HMS Goliath and the Dardanelles ===
Coonagh is also known for having the highest death toll per head of population in World War I, with many Coonagh men enlisting as crew for naval operations in the Dardanelles Campaign due to their nautical experience as fishermen on the Shannon, with at least 8 Coonagh men confirmed as having lost their lives when HMS Goliath was sunk on 13 May 1915 in Morto Bay off Cape Helles, Gallipoli by torpedo fired from the Ottoman destroyer Muâvenet-i Millîye. A memorial was erected in Coonagh to commemorate these men on the centennial anniversary of their deaths in May 2015. The names of these Coonagh men are also commemorated with their HMS Goliath comrades at the Plymouth Naval Memorial in Devon, UK. Descendants of the Coonagh men who died on board Goliath, as well as descendants of those who survived the sinking, as well as other battles during World War I, still live in Coonagh.

Coonagh lost 11 men in total during World War I.

The following 8 are confirmed as having lost their lives on board Goliath, which was the last ship of the Royal Navy to be lost during the First World War:

1. Richard Allen
2. Maurice Cronin
3. Patrick Cronin
4. Patrick Darby
5. John Davis
6. Thomas Davis
7. Thomas Grimes
8. Michael Hickey

Three men from Coonagh survived the attack:

1. Patrick Barrett
2. Patrick Hickey
3. Michael O’Connor

Another Coonagh man, Denis Hogan, had been transferred off the Goliath just a short while before. Two others from Coonagh were lost in 1917. These were John Grimes on the minesweeper Redcar, off Gravelines, France, and his older brother Michael on the drifter Deliverer, just outside Dublin Bay. Patrick Davis of Coonagh lost his life when the minesweeper HMS Ascot was involved in action with a submarine, near the Farne Islands off the English coast on 10 November 1918, the day before the war ended. His brother had gone down with Goliath in 1915.

Thomas (Billy) Grimes, more commonly known as "Tommy Billy", born Apr 1882, served on board HMS Collingwood, HMS Sappho, SS Cevic, RMS Baltic, RMS Carpathia, RMS Mauretania, RMS Caronia, HMS Carnarvon, HMS Orcoma, SS Vauban, and SS Tropic as gun crew, serving during World War I, with some indications he served during World War II also, as his last known seaman's identity card was renewed on 9 August 1943 at the age of 62. He started his naval career by training for 3 months in Bantry on board HMS Collingwood, and then went on to travel to locations including Devonport, Liverpool, the Suez Canal, New York, and Australia, returning to being a fisherman in Coonagh in between as evidenced by Census records. He was also on board SS Statesman during the Dardanelles campaign, supplying HMS Defence with munitions during blockade duty.

In October 1912, he was awarded a Royal Navy Reserve Medal for Long Service and Good Behaviour. He was awarded a Good Conduct Badge (GCB) with four chevrons on 1 Aug 1917 for his service from 1914 to 1917. On 24 Aug 1925, he was awarded the 1914-15 Star, a British War Medal and a Victory Medal.

Michael Grimes (who lost his life when the drifter Deliverer was sunk on 3 November 1917) and his brother John Grimes were also recipients of the 1914-15 Star, British War Medal, and Victory Medal, with Michael Grimes' widow Mary being presented the medals on his behalf.

== Places of interest ==
=== Facilities ===
The Coonagh Aerodrome is home to the Limerick Flying Club

Coonagh Cross Shopping Centre is a shopping centre situated on the west bank of the River Shannon in the Shannon Airport and Ennis direction, when departing from Limerick city centre.

Coonagh is also home a golf driving range (Limerick Driving Range) and to an equestrian centre.

There are plans in place to build a road linking Coonagh Roundabout to Knockalisheen Road, as part of the Limerick Northern Distributor Road.

=== Place names ===
Other landmarks and placenames of note in Coonagh include:

- Thady's Lamp: an unmanned metal lamp tower erected to warn ships navigating the Shannon of shallow waters. Traditionally lit by oil lanterns, the lamp was replaced in recent years with solar-powered electric lighting. A second river-based lamp known as the Rock Lamp is also located nearby.
- Bawneen (Irish: Bàinìn, usually meaning "a loose whitish man's work jacket of homemade undyed flannel or sheep's wool, typically worn by men at outdoor work in the west of Ireland, and the traditional garb of the currach fisherman." Aran jumpers are notably made of bawneen.) However, Coonagh oral history maintains that Báinín means "the small white rock".
- Cealtrach (Irish, commonly used to mean "burial ground"), also known as Craggen, is an infant graveyard and a place for unbaptised children in the townland of Clonconane in Coonagh East.
- Coreen Castle - a castle apparently built by the O'Briens in the 15th century. While marked on older maps of Coonagh, no remains of the castle now stand. Shannon RFC's grounds now occupy the site of what was once Coreen Castle.
- Coonagh House: "Situated near the townland of Coonagh West and about 15 chains east of Coreen Castle, and about 10 chains north-west of Craggen burial ground. This house, once the seat of the Sextons, was built by the family some time around 1700. It was two stories high until 1831, when it was burned and a thatched house built on its site." Records show that a James Sexton, Sherriff and a Thomas Fitzgibbon Sexton, Sherriff, lived in Coonagh House in 1838 and 1839, respectively.
- The Fairy Fort
- Molly Allen's Bush
- The Brick Holes
- Johnny's Road
- Gallymuckle
- Badger setts are also visible just below Thady's Lamp, and Coonagh once had a large population of badgers, although illegal badger baiting in recent decades has resulted in a decline of the native population

== Sport ==
=== Soccer ===
Coonagh Utd. A.F.C. (founded in 1971) play their soccer at their home venue, Coonagh Road, boasting pitches and a clubhouse that Coonagh residents developed and fundraised for over many decades. Coonagh Utd. have had success in both the Clare and Limerick leagues over the years at various age groups, but has been part of the Limerick leagues in recent years, with a league and cup double for the junior team in 2003 a recent highlight. Prior to soccer being hosted at Coonagh Road, Coonagh United's home pitch was located in nearby Clondrinagh (Irish: Cluain Draighneach, meaning a place or meadow abounding in blackthorns.)

=== Gaelic games ===
Many Coonagh men also played gaelic football with the now disbanded Lansdowne Rovers club, with nearby Na Piarsaigh in Caherdavin now being the nearest G.A.A. club for Coonagh residents wanting to play Gaelic football and hurling.

=== Rugby ===
The rugby union side Shannon R.F.C. have made Coonagh West their home ground, on the site of what was once known as Cusack's Farm, and prior to this, the site of Coreen Castle.

== Gallery ==
Photos of Coonagh

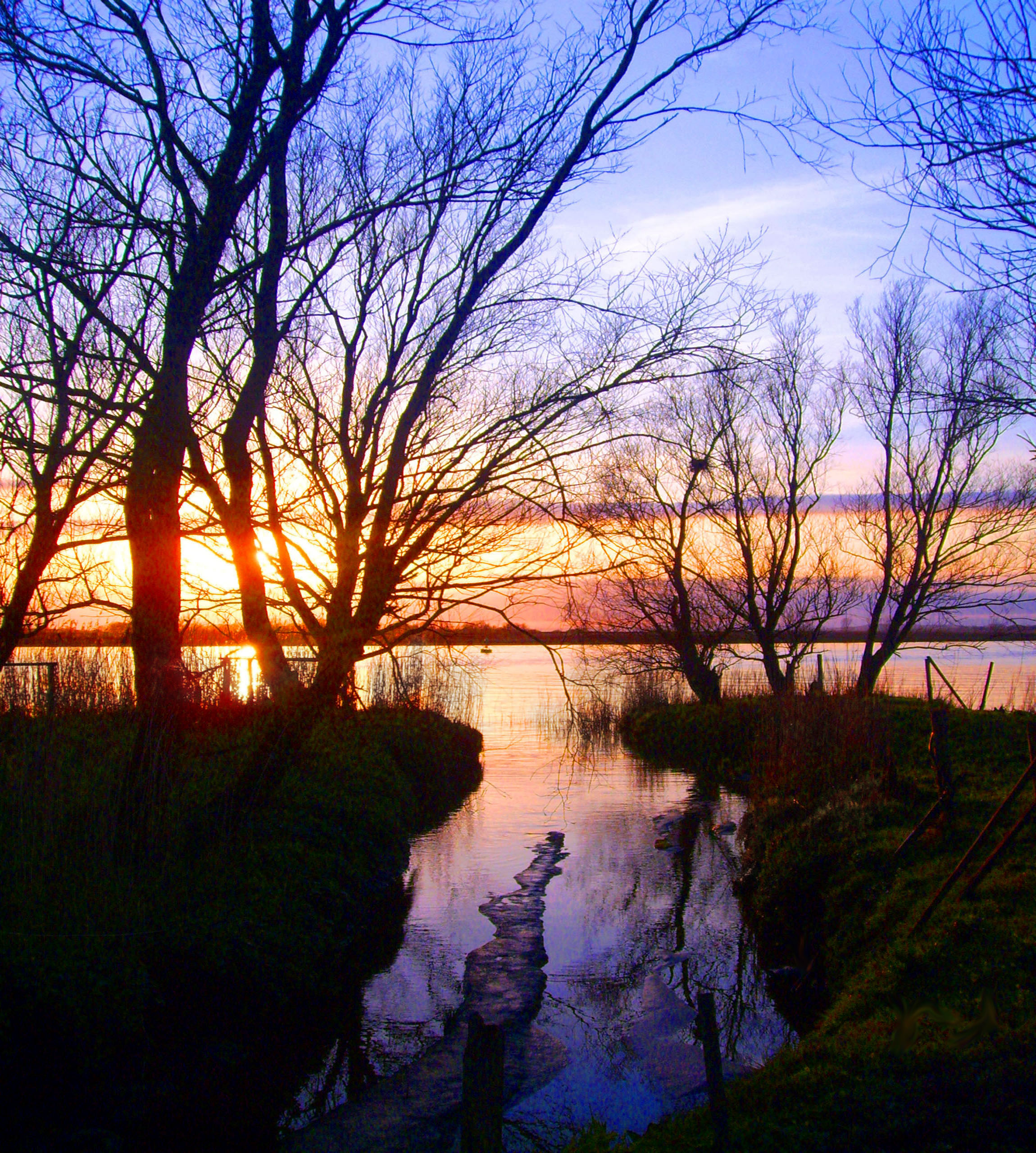
Sunset on the Shannon, showing one of the boat beds in Coonagh where fishermen moored their gandelows

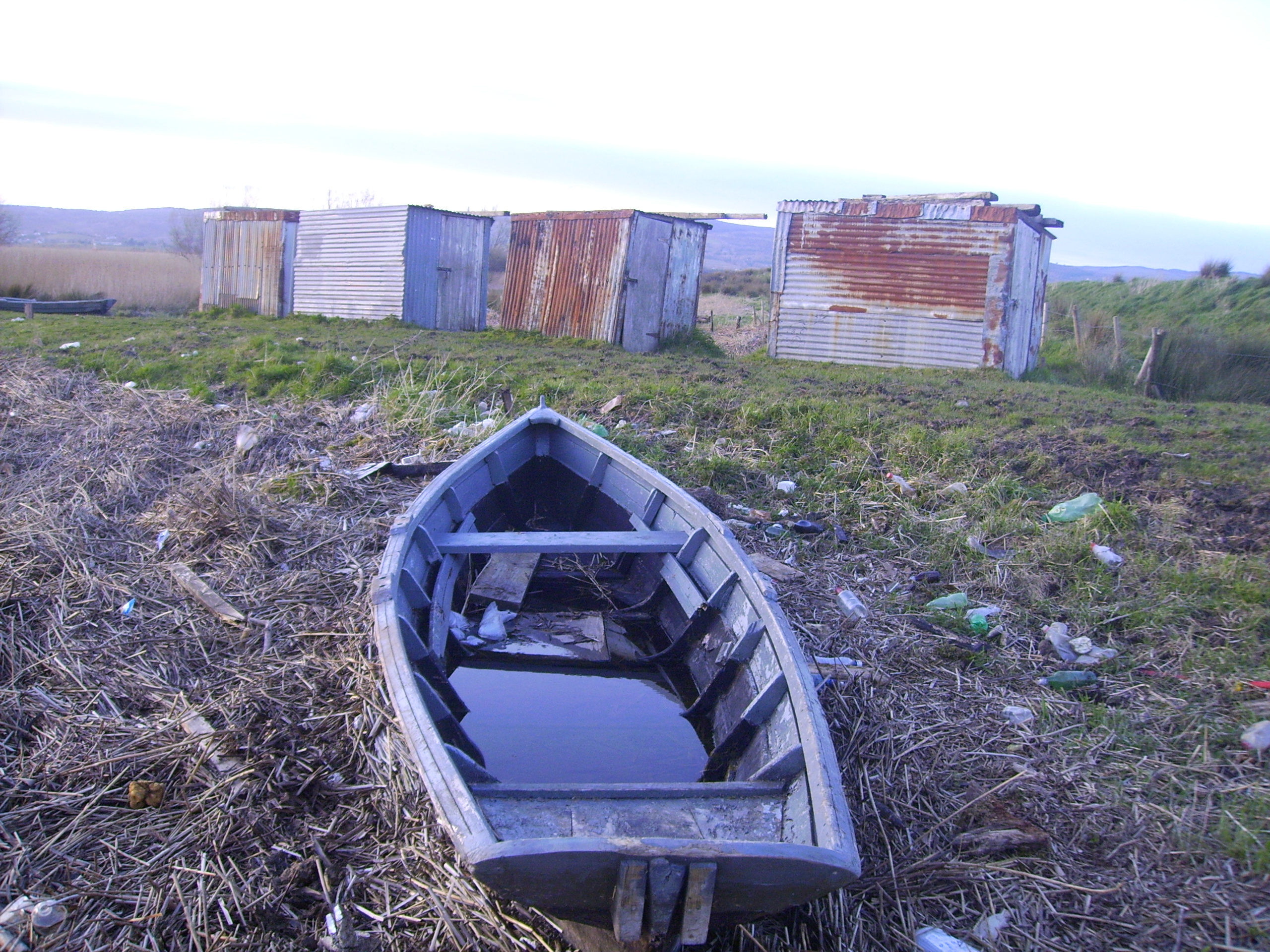
A gandelow used by the fishermen of Coonagh, with fishermens' cabins in the background

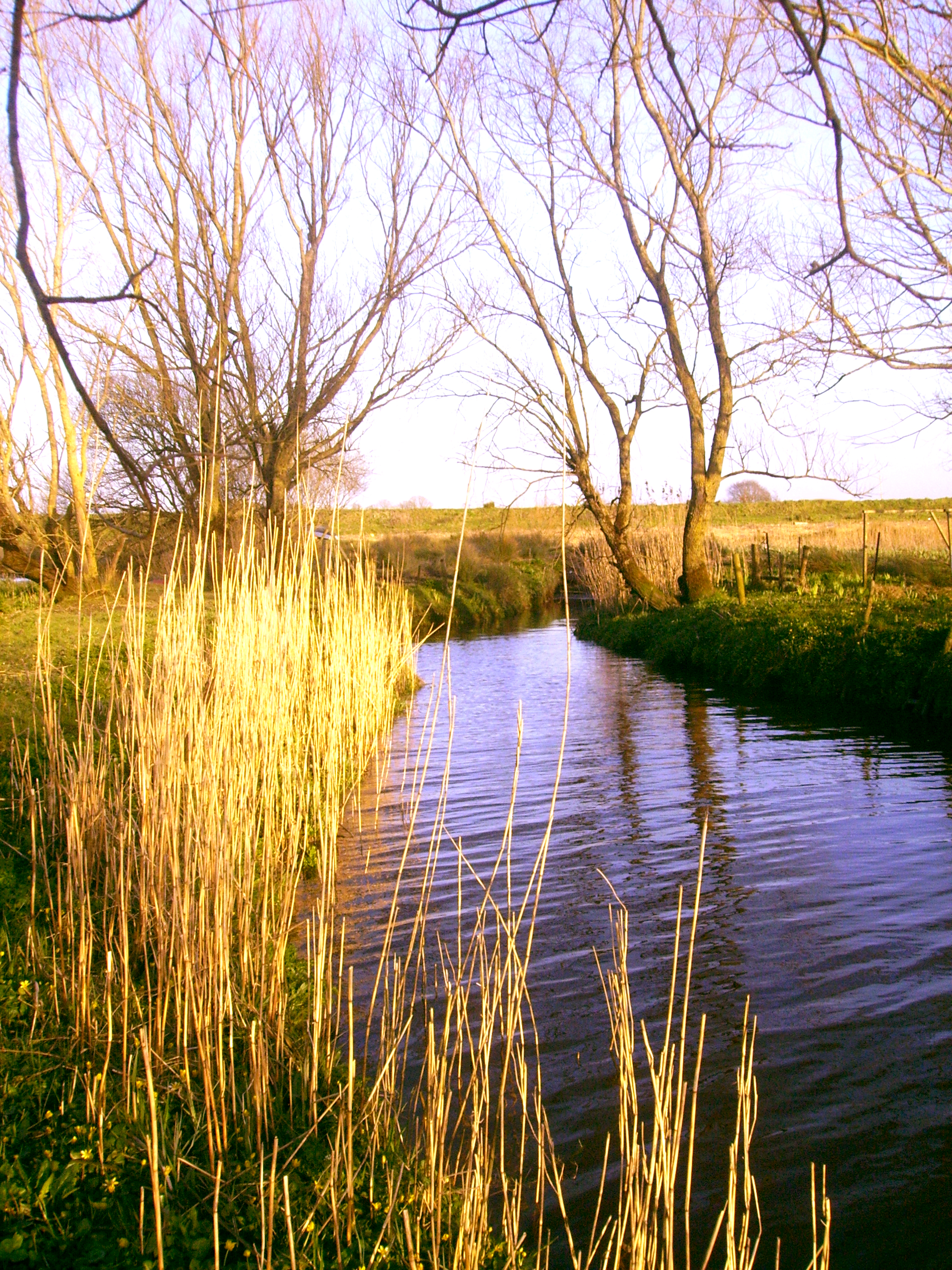
Reeds growing on the banks of the Shannon in Coonagh, traditionally harvested by Coonagh men for thatching

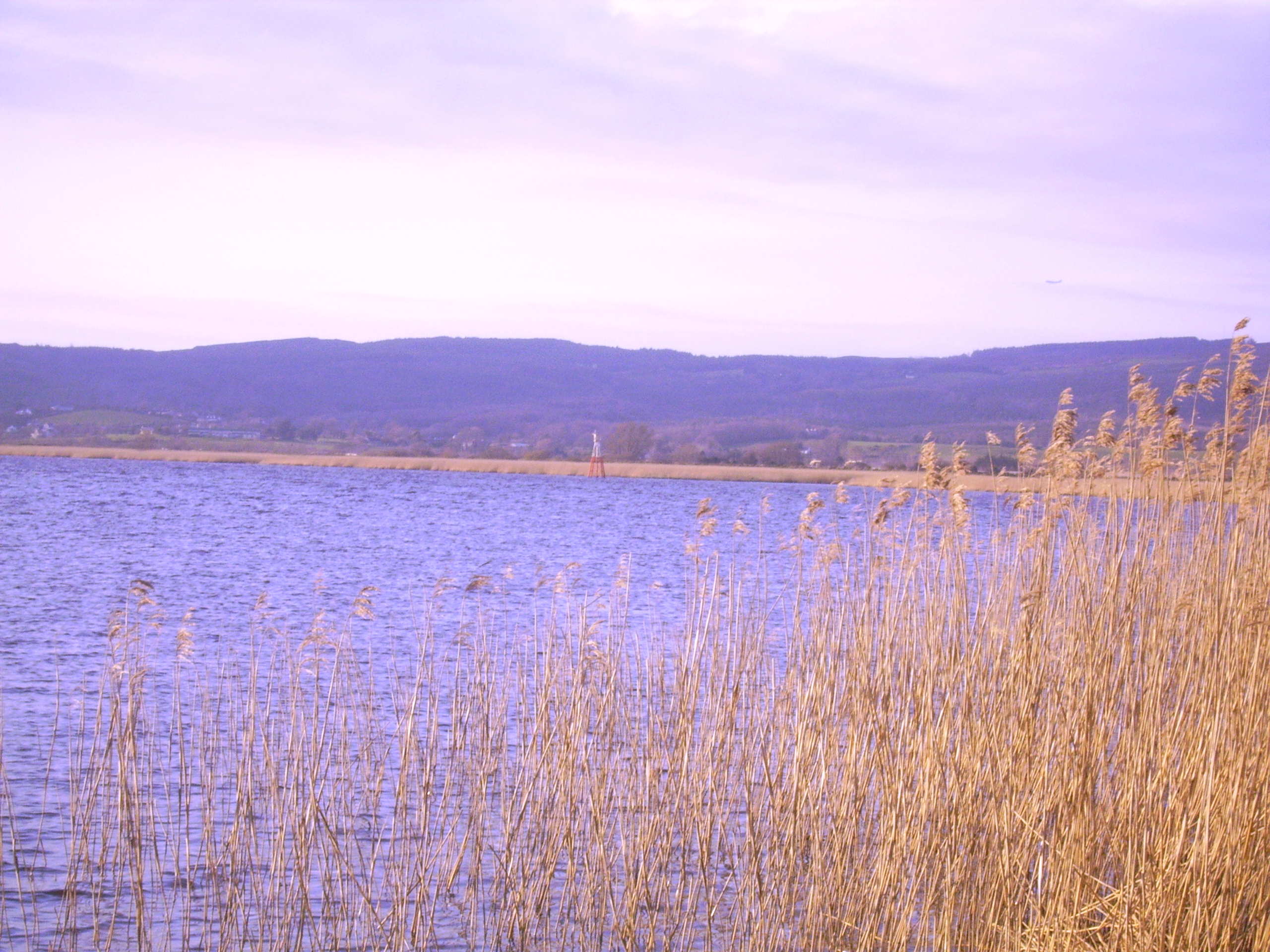
Reed growing on the banks of the Shannon in Coonagh, with the Rock Lamp visible in the background

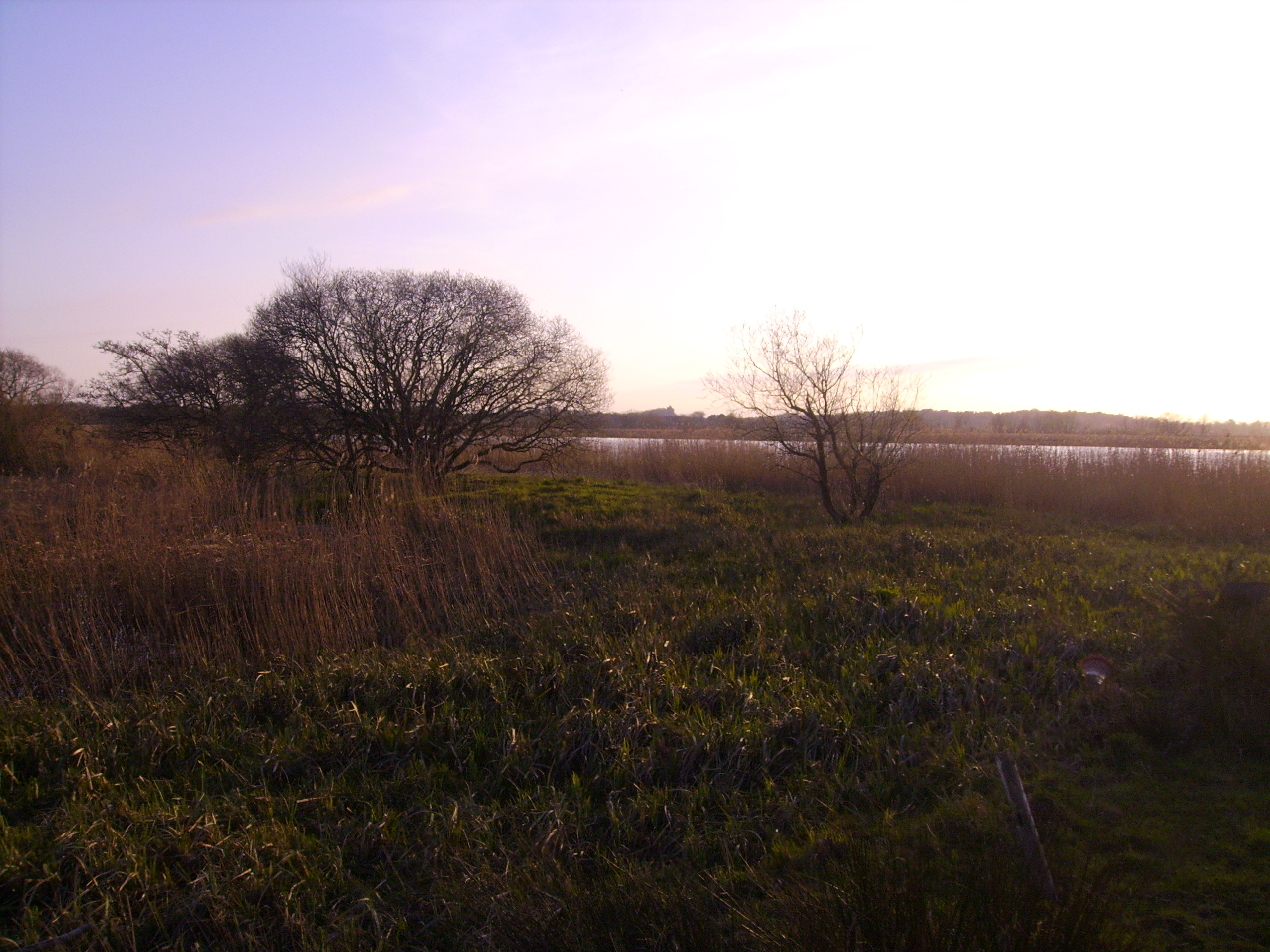
A view of Carrigogunnell Castle (visible in the background), from the Coonagh side of the Shannon

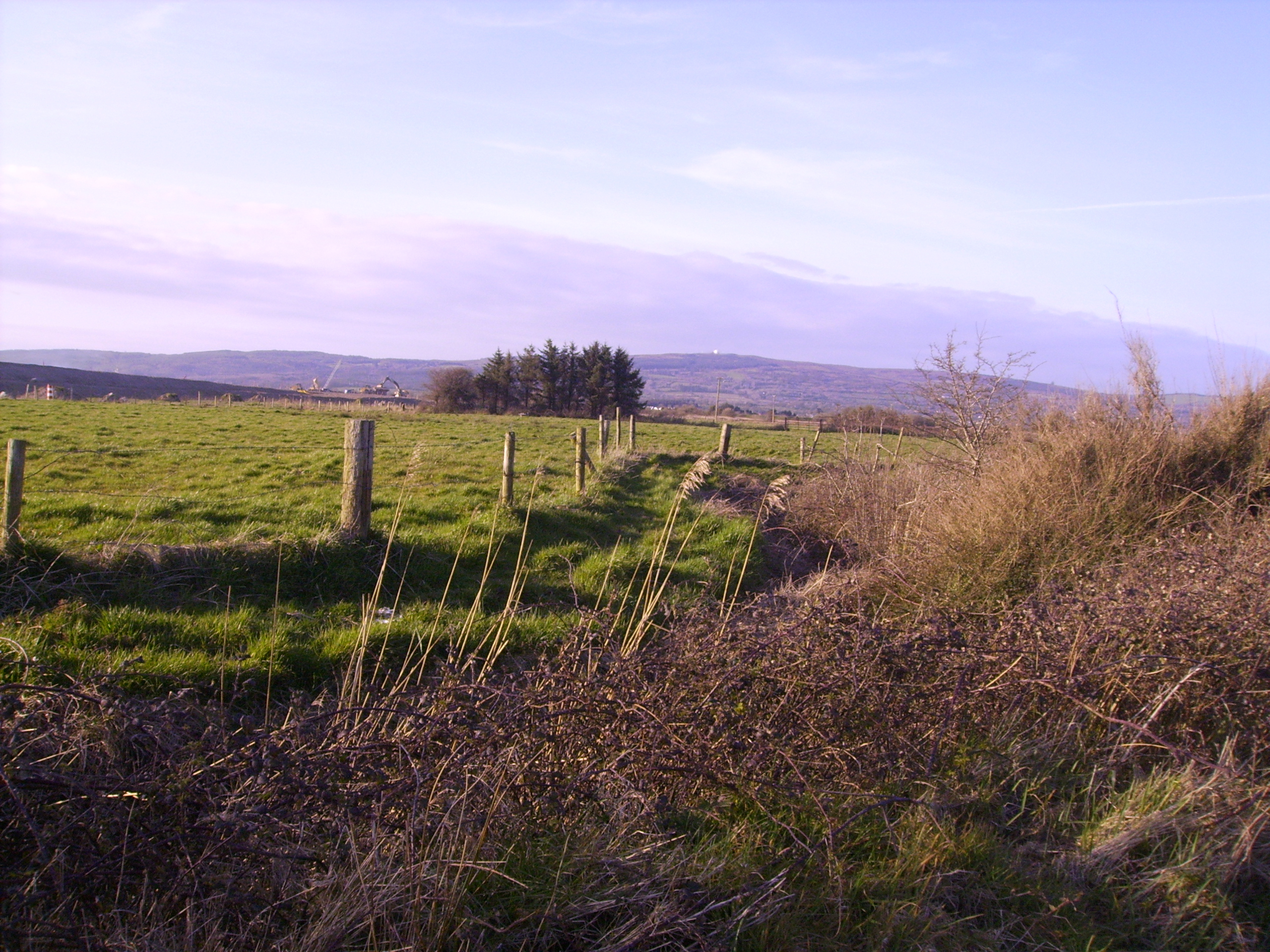
A view of Gallows Hill, Cratloe from the Shannonside in Coonagh. Heavy machinery building the M7 motorway also visible.

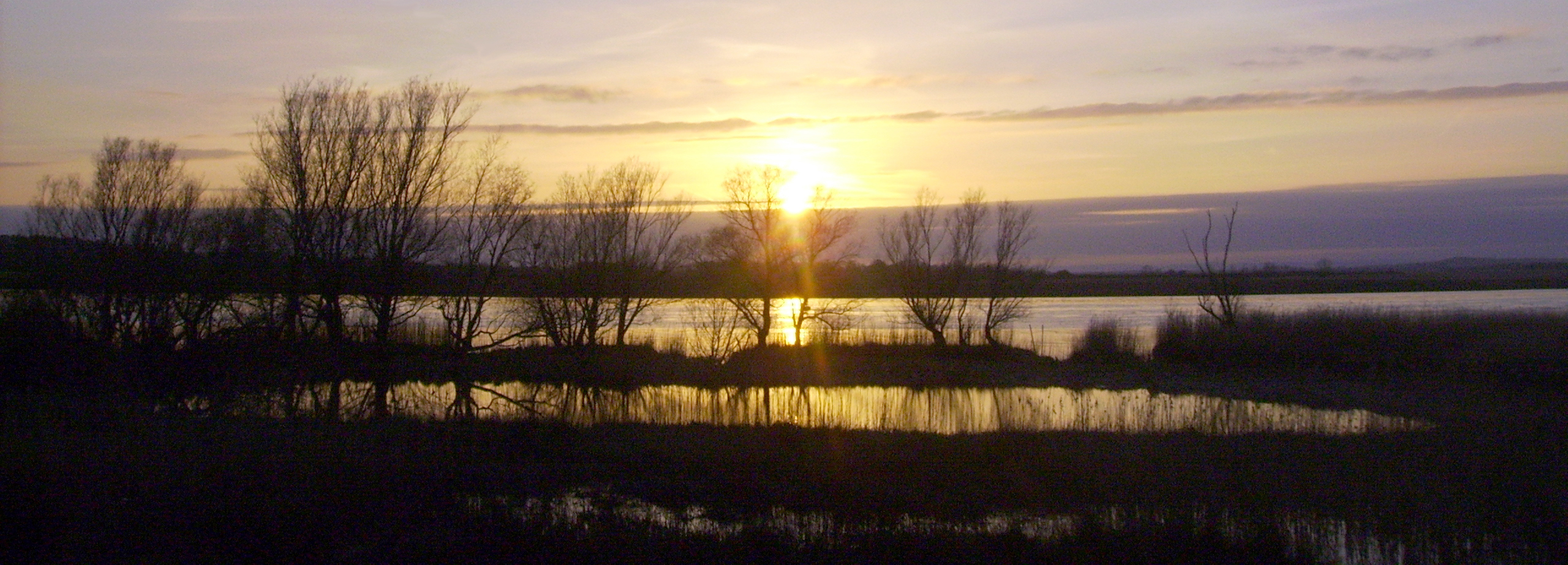
A spring sunset over the Shannon in April, taken from Coonagh

== See also ==
- List of towns and villages in Ireland
- History of Limerick
