= General Brennan =

General Brennan may refer to:

- John W. Brennan (fl. 2010s–2020s), U.S. Army major general
- Kieran Brennan (born 1957), Irish Army major general
- Michael Brennan (Lieutenant-General) (1896–1986), Irish Defence Forces general

== See also ==
- John Milton Brannan (1819−1882), Union Army brigadier general
