= Parteen-Meelick-Coonagh =

Parish in the Republic of Ireland

- Roman Catholic parish
- Location in Ireland
- Coordinates: 52°42′3.05″N 8°39′11.13″W
- Country: Ireland
- Province: Munster
- County: County Clare
- Time zone: UTC+0 (WET)
  - Summer (DST): UTC-1 (IST (WEST))

Parteen-Meelick-Coonagh is a parish in the Roman Catholic Diocese of Limerick. It straddles the counties of Limerick and Clare in Ireland. The areas around Meelick and Parteen are situated in County Clare while the area around Coonagh is in County Limerick. The parish priest (2021) is Thomas Carroll.

The main church of the parish is the Church of St. Patrick in Parteen, completed in 1835. It replaced an earlier chapel. The second church of the parish is the "Church of St. John the Baptist" in Meelick. It was built in the 1830s. The Coonagh section has no own church.
