= 1902 West Donegal by-election =

UK Parliamentary by-election

The 1902 West Donegal by-election was a parliamentary by-election held for the United Kingdom House of Commons constituency of West Donegal on 25 April 1902. The vacancy arose because of the resignation of the sitting member James Boyle, of the Irish Parliamentary Party.

Only one candidate was nominated, Hugh Law of the Irish Parliamentary Party, who was elected unopposed.

== Result ==
1902 West Donegal by-election
Party	Candidate	Votes	%	±%
Irish Parliamentary	Hugh Law	Unopposed		
Registered electors		7,303		
Irish Parliamentary hold				
