= List of airports in Ireland =

List of airports in Ireland may refer to:

- List of airports in the Republic of Ireland
- List of airports in the United Kingdom and the British Crown Dependencies#Northern Ireland
