= Caherdavin =

Suburb of Limerick, Ireland

Coordinates: 52°40′15″N 8°39′53″W

Caherdavin (Irish: Cathair Dháibhín, meaning 'stone fort of Dáibhín') is a northern suburban district of Limerick city in the mid-west of Ireland. As of 2022, the population of Caherdavin was 7,364. It is around 2.5 km west of the city centre.

Local landmarks include the Moylish campus of Technological University of the Shannon (formerly Limerick Institute of Technology), a third level college and research centre, the Jetland Shopping Centre which opened in 2005, Christ the King Church which opened in September 1985, with adjoining primary boys' and girls' schools (Christ the King N.S and Mary Queen of Ireland N.S respectively), alongside Thomond Community College (formerly St. Nessan's Community College), a secondary school in Moylish Park. Both the Gaelic Grounds and Thomond Park are nearby.

== History ==
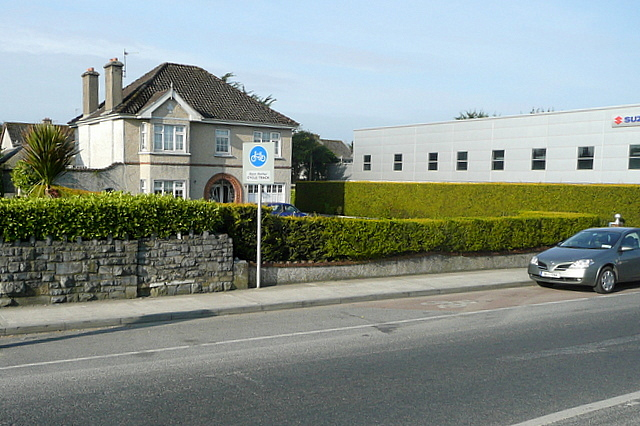
Caherdavin Park

Caherdavin was originally part of the "Northern Liberties" granted to Limerick Corporation in 1216 by King John. It remained part of Limerick City until 1840 when it became part of the new Limerick County Council; it returned to Limerick City in 2008. It was part of the parish of St. Munchin, which originally extended to Cratloe in County Clare, until Christ the King parish was formed after the 1960s housing boom in the area.

The site of Caherdavin was developed for housing in the 1960s and has grown rapidly since then. Industry is confined to the Clondrinagh Industrial Estate which houses mainly workshop units. The other form of employment in the area, as of 2024, is the services industry (including shops, a doctor's surgery and Lidl supermarket).

In 2005, the large Jetland Shopping Centre opened, providing new retail space and a Dunnes Stores supermarket, refurbished in 2021. Ivan's shop was a longstanding cornerstone of Caherdavin Cross before closing in 2019. A Laya Healthcare clinic now occupies the former Ivan's shop. A Bank of Ireland branch, previously located in Melvin Grove but moved to the Jetlands S.C, closed in 2019. A Limerick & District Credit Union branch (formerly Caherdavin Credit Union) is located in Redgate. A Tesco supermarket and adjoining Certa service station are located in Coonagh Cross Shopping Centre in the neighbouring Coonagh area.

== Organisation ==
The district includes the townlands of Ballygrennan, Clonmacken, Caherdavin, Clonconane, Clondrinagh, Coonagh, Knock and Shannabummy. As of November 2016, this area is part of Limerick city. To the south and west is the River Shannon whilst to the east is the old Limerick city boundary Borough and to the north is the boundary with County Clare.

The area is broken up into four sub-districts by the Clonmacken Road, the Ennis road and the Cratloe road. There is Caherdavin Lawn, Caherdavin Park, and Caherdavin Heights. Caherdavin is approximately 1.5 miles north from Limerick city centre.

== Clubs ==
The 23rd Limerick Scout Group has its hall beside the primary schools and has been active for over 30 years. The Community Centre houses a branch of Limerick City and County Council's library service. The Irish Girl Guides are active in the area. The Na Piarsaigh GAA clubhouse and grounds is at Caherdavin Lawn, along with the Crowley School of Ballet and Tap Dancing.

The local church hosts three choirs - The Senior Choir, the Folk Choir, and the Taize Choir. The Caherdavin Youth Club, which is one of Limerick's longest running youth clubs, operates from the community centre.

There is a playing field in Caherdavin Park, near the Greenhills hotel, which is used by youth soccer teams such as Caherdavin Celtic FC and for other community sports.

== Transport ==
Roads run over the three Shannon bridges from the city centre through Caherdavin in the direction of Shannon Airport, Ennis, and Galway, as well as for the Limerick Tunnel. Many of Caherdavin's residents work in the local area or travel to other city suburbs such as Raheen, Dooradoyle and Castletroy.

Bus Éireann operates route 302 between Caherdavin and the city centre serving Technological University of the Shannon (TUS; formerly LIT), Thomond Park, Thomondgate and Clancy's Strand. Bus lanes were built on the Ennis Road (city direction) in 2007 to help alleviate congestion and prioritise buses for users to the city centre. Route 343 towards Shannon Airport and Ennis serves the nearby Jetlands S.C and Coonagh.

In 2010, the Limerick Tunnel, built underneath the River Shannon, opened near to Caherdavin, providing a cross-city connection avoiding the city centre and Condell Road bypass.

The Coonagh Aerodrome, a few kilometres west of Caherdavin, provides access for small aircraft. Larger commercial aircraft use Shannon Airport, which lies 20km west in County Clare.
