= 1890 West Donegal by-election =

UK Parliamentary by-election

The 1890 West Donegal by-election was a parliamentary by-election held for the United Kingdom House of Commons constituency of West Donegal on 30 May 1890. The vacancy arose because of the resignation of the sitting member, Patrick O'Hea of the Irish Parliamentary Party. Only one candidate was nominated, J. J. Dalton of the Irish Parliamentary Party, who was elected unopposed.

== Result ==
1890 West Donegal by-election
Party	Candidate	Votes	%	±%
Irish Parliamentary	J. J. Dalton	Unopposed	N/A	N/A
Irish Parliamentary hold				
