= Patrick O'Hea =

Patrick O'Hea (born 1848) was an Irish nationalist politician and a Member of Parliament (MP) from 1885 to 1890.

At the 1885 general election he was elected unopposed as an Irish Parliamentary Party MP for the newly created West Donegal constituency. He was re-elected unopposed in 1886, and resigned from the House of Commons of the United Kingdom on 19 May 1890 by becoming Steward of the Manor of Northstead.

Parliament of the United Kingdom
New constituency	Member of Parliament for West Donegal; 1885 – 1890	Succeeded by J. J. Dalton
