= Timothy Daniel Sullivan =

Irish nationalist, journalist, politician and poet (1827–1914)

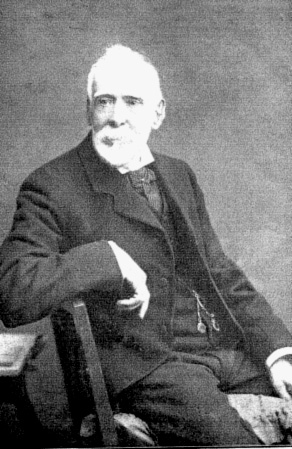

Member of Parliament for West Donegal
- In office 7 July 1892 – 25 October 1900
- Preceded by: J. J. Dalton
- Succeeded by: James Boyle

Member of Parliament for Dublin College Green
- In office 1 December 1885 – 5 July 1892
- Preceded by: New office
- Succeeded by: J. E. Kenny

Member of Parliament for County Westmeath
- In office 1 April 1880 – 25 November 1885
- Preceded by: Patrick James Smyth; Lord Robert Montagu
- Succeeded by: Office abolished

Lord Mayor of Dublin
- In office 4 July 1886 – 15 July 1888
- Preceded by: John O'Connor
- Succeeded by: Thomas Sexton

Personal details
- Born: 29 May 1827 Bantry, County Cork, Ireland
- Died: 14 March 1914 (aged 86) Dublin, Ireland
- Party: Irish Parliamentary Party
- Spouse: Catherine Healy (m. 1856–1899)
- Relations: Alexander Martin Sullivan (brother); Donal Sullivan (brother); Kevin O'Higgins (grandson); Tom O'Higgins (great-grandson); Michael O'Higgins (brother-in-law); Tim Healy (brother-in-law)
- Children: 3
- Education: Trinity College Dublin

Timothy Daniel Sullivan (29 May 1827 – 31 March 1914) was an Irish nationalist, journalist, politician and poet who wrote the Irish national hymn "God Save Ireland", in 1867. He served as Lord Mayor of Dublin from 1886 to 1888 and a Member of Parliament (MP) from 1880 to 1900.

== Politician ==
Sullivan was a member of the Home Rule League, supporting Charles Stewart Parnell in the 1880 general election, being "convinced that without self-government there could never be peace, prosperity or contentment in Ireland". He joined the Irish Parliamentary Party when it was established in 1882. When the party split in 1891, he became an Anti-Parnellite until the Nationalist factions were reunited in 1900.

Sullivan represented a number of constituencies in the House of Commons of the United Kingdom of Great Britain and Ireland. He was elected as an MP for County Westmeath in 1880 and served until 1885. In 1885, he was elected to the newly created constituency of Dublin College Green. He joined the anti-Parnellite Irish National Federation in 1891, and was defeated by a Parnellite in the 1892 general election. Four days later he was returned unopposed for West Donegal which he represented until he retired in 1900.

He was Lord Mayor of Dublin in 1886 and 1887.

== Publicist ==
He owned and edited a number of publications (The Nation, Dublin Weekly News and Young Ireland). In December 1887, he published reports of meetings by the Irish National League. As a result, he was convicted and imprisoned for two months under the Crimes Act.

As well as writing the Irish national hymn "God Save Ireland", he wrote the adopted anthem of the All-for-Ireland League: "All for Ireland! One for all! and popular pieces such as Dear Old Ireland, "Song from the Backwoods" and "Michael Dwyer".

== Family ==
He was married to Catherine (Kate) Healy who was the sister of Tim Healy, the first Governor General of the Irish Free State in 1922. A number of his descendants were people of outstanding distinction. His son Timothy was Chief Justice of Ireland from 1936 to 1946. His daughter Frances was an Irish-language activist in Craobh an Chéitinnigh, the Keating branch of the Gaelic League (Conradh na Gaeilge) and a lecturer in Irish. His daughter Anne (who had sixteen children) was the mother of politician Kevin O'Higgins, one of the dominant political figures of the 1920s. Sullivan's great-grandson Tom O'Higgins served as Chief Justice of Ireland from 1974 to 1985.

His brother, Alexander Martin Sullivan, author of New Ireland and a fervent constitutional and cultural nationalist, was the owner and editor of The Nation after Gavan Duffy, and prior to Timothy Daniel Sullivan.

== Notes ==
- Sullivan, T.D. (1905) Recollections of Troubled Times in Irish Politics. Dublin: Sealy, Bryers & Walker; M.H. Gills & Son, Ltd. Retrieved on 30 March 2011.

Parliament of the United Kingdom
| Preceded by Patrick James Smyth; Lord Robert Montagu | Member of Parliament for County Westmeath; 1880 – 1885; With: Henry Gill 1880–1883; Timothy Harrington 1883–1885 | Constituency divided |
| New constituency | Member of Parliament for Dublin College Green; 1885 – 1892 | Succeeded by J. E. Kenny |
| Preceded by J. J. Dalton | Member of Parliament for West Donegal; 1892 – 1900 | Succeeded by James Boyle |
Civic offices
| Preceded by John O'Connor | Lord Mayor of Dublin; 1886–1888 | Succeeded by Thomas Sexton |
