= West Donegal (UK Parliament constituency) =

UK parliamentary constituency in Ireland, 1885–1922

- Former county constituency for the House of Commons

1885–1922
- Seats: 1
- Created from: County Donegal
- Replaced by: Donegal

West Donegal was a UK Parliament constituency in Ireland, returning one Member of Parliament from 1885 to 1922.

Prior to the 1885 United Kingdom general election the area was part of the County Donegal constituency. From 1922, on the establishment of the Irish Free State, it was not represented in the UK Parliament.

== Boundaries ==
This constituency comprised the western part of County Donegal, consisting of the barony of Boylagh and that part of the barony of Kilmacrenan contained within the parishes of Clondahorky, Gartan, Kilmacrenan, Mevagh, Raymunterdoney and Tullaghobegly and the townlands of Ballybolander, Boheolan, Cabra Brook, Cabra Glebe, Carnatreantagh, Carrick, Carrickyscanlan, Cloncarney, Dromore, Drumcavany, Keeloges, Maghernagran, Pollans, Roshin, Stackarnagh, Temple Douglas, Treanbeg and Tullanascreen in the parish of Conwal.

== Members of Parliament ==
Election	Member	Party	Note
1885, December 1	Patrick O'Hea	Irish Parliamentary	Resigned
1890, May 30	J. J. Dalton	Irish Parliamentary	Party split
1890, December ^{1}	J. J. Dalton	Irish National League	
1892, July 11	Timothy Daniel Sullivan	Irish National Federation	
1900, October 3	James Boyle	Irish Parliamentary	Resigned
1902, April 25	Hugh Law	Irish Parliamentary	
1918, December 14 ^{2}	Joseph Sweeney	Sinn Féin	Did not take his seat at Westminster
1922, October 26	UK constituency abolished		

Note:-

- ^{1} Not an election, but the date of a party change. The Irish Parliamentary Party had been created in 1882, on the initiative of Charles Stewart Parnell's Irish National League. Both the IPP and the INL split into Parnellite and Anti-Parnellite factions, in December 1890. The Parnellites remained members of the Irish National League after the split and the Anti-Parnellites organised the Irish National Federation in March 1891. The two organisations and the United Irish League merged in 1900, to re-create the Irish Parliamentary Party.
- ^{2} Date of polling day. The result was declared on 28 December 1918, to allow time for votes cast by members of the armed forces to be included in the count.

== Elections ==
=== Elections in the 1880s ===
General election 1 December 1885: Donegal West
Party	Candidate	Votes	%	±%
Irish Parliamentary	Patrick O'Hea	Unopposed		
Registered electors		7,377		
Irish Parliamentary win (new seat)				

General election 6 July 1886: Donegal West
Party	Candidate	Votes	%	±%
Irish Parliamentary	Patrick O'Hea	Unopposed		
Registered electors		7,377		
Irish Parliamentary hold				

=== Elections in the 1890s ===
By-election 30 May 1890: Donegal West
Party	Candidate	Votes	%	±%
Irish Parliamentary	J. J. Dalton	Unopposed		
Registered electors		5,536		
Irish Parliamentary hold				

General election 11 July 1892: Donegal West
Party	Candidate	Votes	%	±%
Irish National Federation	Timothy Daniel Sullivan	Unopposed		
Registered electors		5,279		
Irish National Federation gain from Irish Parliamentary				

General election 18 July 1895: Donegal West
Party	Candidate	Votes	%	±%
Irish National Federation	Timothy Daniel Sullivan	Unopposed		
Registered electors		6,254		
Irish National Federation hold				

=== Elections in the 1900s ===
General election 3 October 1900: Donegal West
Party	Candidate	Votes	%	±%
Irish Parliamentary	James Boyle	Unopposed		
Registered electors		9,475		
Irish Parliamentary hold				

By-election 25 April 1902: Donegal West
Party	Candidate	Votes	%	±%
Irish Parliamentary	Hugh Law	Unopposed		
Registered electors		7,303		
Irish Parliamentary hold				

General election 20 January 1906: Donegal West
Party	Candidate	Votes	%	±%
Irish Parliamentary	Hugh Law	Unopposed		
Registered electors		6,958		
Irish Parliamentary hold				

=== Elections in the 1910s ===
General election 22 January 1910: Donegal West
Party	Candidate	Votes	%	±%
Irish Parliamentary	Hugh Law	Unopposed		
Registered electors		6,642		
Irish Parliamentary hold				

General election 10 December 1910: Donegal West
Party	Candidate	Votes	%	±%
Irish Parliamentary	Hugh Law	Unopposed		
Registered electors		6,642		
Irish Parliamentary hold				

General Election 14 December 1918: Donegal West
Party	Candidate	Votes	%	±%
Sinn Féin	Joseph Sweeney	6,712	62.0	New
Irish Parliamentary	Daniel McMenamin	4,116	38.0	N/A
Majority		2,596	24.0	N/A
Turnout		10,828	56.1	N/A
Registered electors		19,296		
Sinn Féin hold		Swing	N/A	

== Sources ==
- Walker, Brian M., ed. (1978). Parliamentary Election Results in Ireland, 1801–1922. Dublin: Royal Irish Academy. ISBN 0901714127.
