= James Boyle (Irish Parliamentary Party politician) =

Irish politician

James Boyle MP

James Boyle (1863 – 1 December 1936) was a solicitor and Irish Nationalist politician from Stranorlar in County Donegal, who served in the United Kingdom House of Commons as a member of the Irish Parliamentary Party at the start of the 20th century.

Boyle was a delegate to the Irish Race Convention held in Dublin in September 1896, and at the general election in October 1900 he was elected unopposed as Member of Parliament for West Donegal. He told the Irish Party's leader John Redmond in March 1902 of his intention to resign his seat, and he formally resigned from the Commons on 10 April.

A coroner before his election to Parliament, he was listed in the 1901 edition of Who's Who as being over 200 years old (and therefore having lived in for centuries). Boyle died in 1936, aged 73, and was buried in the family burial grounds at Dungloe after requiem mass in Stranorlar. The mourners at his funeral included his widow and two daughters.

Parliament of the United Kingdom
| Preceded by Timothy Daniel Sullivan | Member of Parliament for West Donegal; 1900 – 1902 | Succeeded by Hugh Law |
