= St Patrick's (civil parish, Clare and Limerick) =

Civil parish in Ireland

St. Patrick's Cill Chuáin Kilquane
- Civil parish
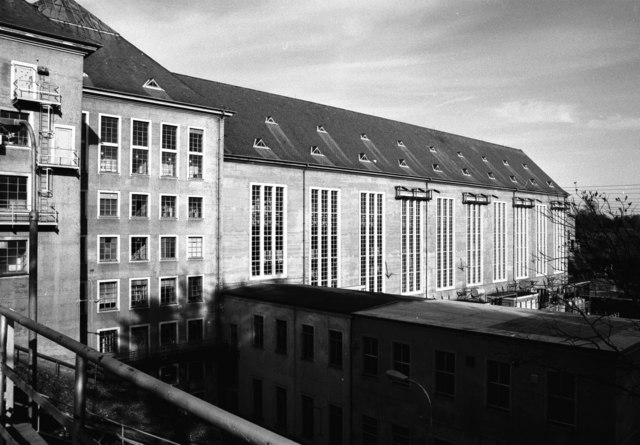
- Ardnacrusha hydroelectric power station 1985

- Location within Ireland
- Coordinates: 52°42′32″N 8°36′40″W
- Country: Ireland
- Province: Munster
- County: County Clare, County Limerick
- Time zone: UTC+0 (WET)
  - Summer (DST): UTC-1 (IST (WEST))

St. Patrick's, or Kilquane (Irish: Cill Chuáin), is a civil parish situated on both banks of the River Shannon near the city of Limerick in Ireland. It is unusual in that it is distributed over three baronies: Bunratty Lower, Clanwilliam and the barony of the City of Limerick. Besides the suburbs of the city, it also contains the villages of Ardnacrusha and Parteen. It is known for the Ardnacrusha power plant, a major hydroelectric plant.

== Location ==
The parish lies on both sides of the River Shannon. As of 1845 the portion of the parish in County Limerick was partly in the borough of Limerick, where it included the Chapelry of Singland, and partly in the barony of Clanwilliam. The portion in County Clare was in the barony of Bunratty Lower, and was known as the Kilquane district. It contains the village of Ardnacrusha. The parish is 4 by 2.5 miles (6.4 by 4.0 km) and covers 722 acres (292 ha) of the borough, 793 acres (321 ha) of Clanwilliam and 3,894 acres (1,576 ha) of Bunratty. The Blackwater river, which runs into the Shannon from the north, at one time powered flour mills.

Ardnacrusha is the site of a major hydroelectric power plant driven by water diverted from the Shannon near Parteen Villa, and carried by canal to the site.

== Antiquities ==
There are, or were, three castles. King John’s Castle was built by John, King of England (ruled 1199–1216) at Parteen on the bank of the Shannon. Castlebank, a stronghold of the Earls of Thomond that was completely ruined by 1897, was not mentioned in the list of Thomond castles of 1580. It had probably not yet been built. Dromin Castle is also not in the 1580 list. The bridge at Parteen has a Latin inscription saying it was made by Peter Creagh, son of Andrew, at the expense of the city of Limerick in 1635.

In 1841 the total population was 4,132 in 656 houses.

== Catholic parish ==
The name Kilquane (Cill Chuáin) means 'church of Chuáin', the patron saint of the parish. The ruins of the church of Kilquane, with a graveyard beside it, stand in the townland of Kilquane near the Shannon. The site is about 10 metres (33 ft) from the river on a low, sandy ridge that runs parallel to the river. It is flooded annually. It contains large tombs of members of the Holmes and Fitzgerald families.

In 1849 Kilquane was part of the Catholic district of Parteen, which also includes the parish of Killely or Meelick. It contained the chapels of Ardnacrusha, a handsome building of hewn stone, and of Parteen. Kilquane is now in the parish of St. Patrick's in Parteen, a parish in the Roman Catholic Diocese of Limerick.

== Townlands ==
- Located in the barony of Bunratty Lower, in the county of Clare

Athlunkard, Ballycannan, Ballyfinneen, Ballyglass, Ballykeelaun, Blackwater, Castlebank, Cloonoughter, Drummin, Fairyhill, Garraun, Gortatogher, Kilquane, Knockballynameath, Lakyle, Parkroe, Parteen, Quinspool North, Quinspool South, Reanabrone, Rosmadda East, Rosmadda West and Shannakyle.

- Located in the barony of Clanwilliam, in the county of Limerick

Park, Reboge, Reboge Meadows, Singland

- Located in the barony of the City of Limerick

Corbally, Grove Island, Reboge Island
