= Moyne Aerodrome =

Moyne Aerodrome (Closed)
- IATA: none; ICAO: none

Summary
- Airport type: Private
- Serves: Thurles
- Location: Moyne
- Elevation AMSL: 58 m (190 ft)
- Coordinates: 52°42′11.1″N 07°42′19.8″W
- Interactive map of Moyne Aerodrome (Closed)

Runways
Direction	Length		Surface
Direction	m	ft	Surface
02/20	355	1,165	grass

Moyne Aerodrome was an aerodrome situated north east of Thurles, County Tipperary in Ireland. The aerodrome is no longer operational. As of 2008, it was one of only two official aerodromes in County Tipperary.

From the air, this aerodrome was known to be difficult to find, as there is nothing remarkable that stands out in the vicinity of the airfield. There is a large factory building about one km (0.62 mi) west of the field which may be the best landmark for the airfield. Features include a small hangar in the northwest corner of the field and a small windsock about 100 metres (330 ft) into the field from the threshold of runway 20. Overhead power cables on the approach to runway 20 should be considered when approaching. The aerodrome has been closed since approximately 2016.

== See also ==
- Aerodromes of Ireland
