= Joseph Sweeney (Irish politician) =

Irish politician and military commander (1897–1980)

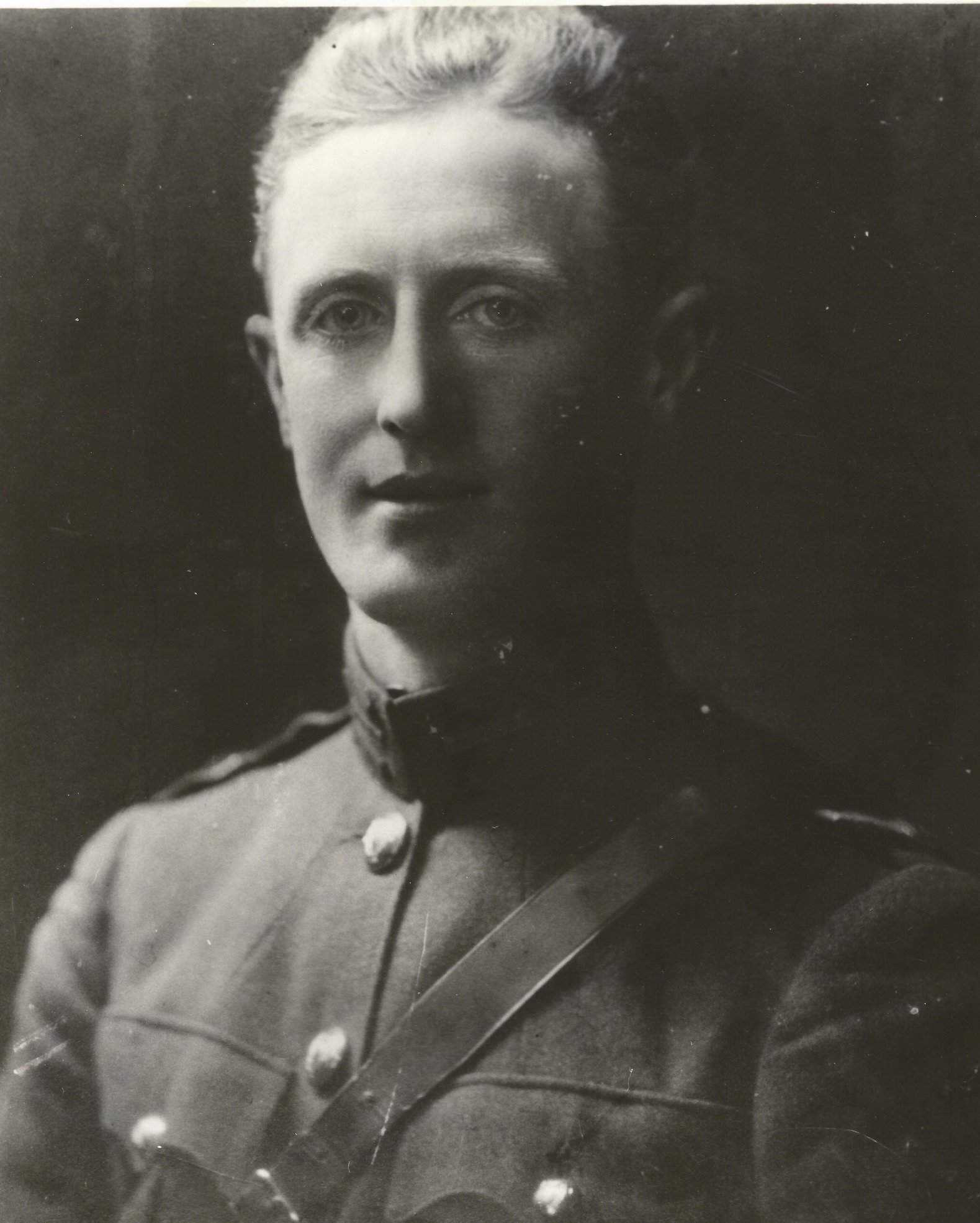
- Sweeney in 1929

Chief of Staff of the Defence Forces
- In office October 1929 – October 1931
- Preceded by: Seán Mac Eoin
- Succeeded by: Michael Brennan
- Constituency: Donegal

Teachta Dála
- In office June 1922 – August 1923
- In office December 1918 – May 1921
- Constituency: Donegal West

Personal details
- Born: 13 May 1897 Burtonport, County Donegal, Ireland
- Died: 25 November 1980 (aged 83) Dublin, Ireland
- Party: Sinn Féin (Pro-Treaty); Cumann na nGaedheal
- Children: 3

Military service
- Allegiance: Irish Republic (until 1922); Irish Free State (from 1922)
- Branch/service: Irish Volunteers (1914–1919); Irish Republican Army (1919–1922); National Army (1922–1940)
- Rank: Chief of Staff of the Defence Forces
- Battles/wars: Easter Rising; Irish War of Independence; Irish Civil War

Joseph Aloysius Sweeney (13 June 1897 – 25 November 1980) was an Irish politician and military commander. He fought in the Easter Rising in the GPO and was a member of the IRA during the war of independence. He later became Chief of Staff of the Irish Army.

== Background ==
Sweeney was born and raised in Burtonport, a town in The Rosses, a district in the west of County Donegal. He was the son of general merchant and hotelier John Sweeney and Margaret O'Donnell. He came from an Irish Nationalist family; his father had been jailed during the Land War as well as being a president of the local branch of the Ancient Order of Hibernians and a founder of the Irish Volunteers in Donegal. He received his secondary education at St Eunan's College in Letterkenny and St. Enda's School in Rathfarnham, where Patrick Pearse was Headmaster. Pearse solidified Sweeney's nationalist beliefs, and in 1914 Sweeney joined the Irish Volunteers himself. By September 1914 he was a student in University College Dublin and he had transferred to Pearse's unit in the Dublin Brigade, which styled itself "Pearse's own" and had many former students of Pearse amongst their number. In 1915 Sweeney was sworn into the Irish Republican Brotherhood by Pearse.

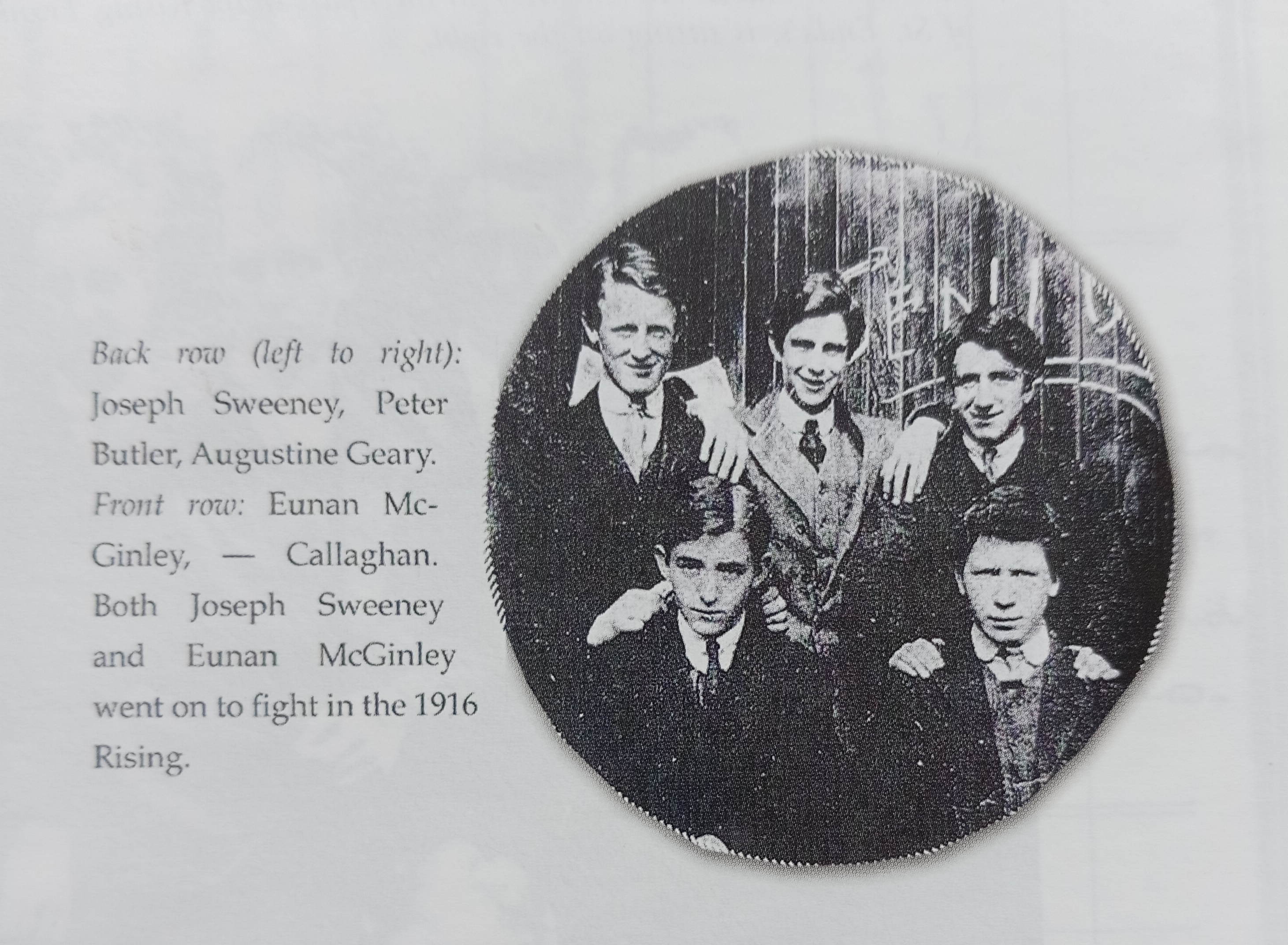
St Enda's Students. Back Row: Joe Sweeney, Peter Butler, Augustine Geary. Front Row: Eunan Mc Ginley, Callaghan

== Easter Rising ==
Sweeney was active during the events of the Easter Rising, where he fought in Dublin's Liberty Hall and later the GPO where he was a stretcher bearer for the wounded James Connolly. Following the surrender of rebel forces, Sweeney was taken to Stafford Jail, and was later interned in Frongoch internment camp in Wales. By October 1916, he had been released, whereupon he rejoined the Volunteers and once again resumed his studies at UCD. During the following summers he returned to Donegal and reorganised the Volunteers in that county.

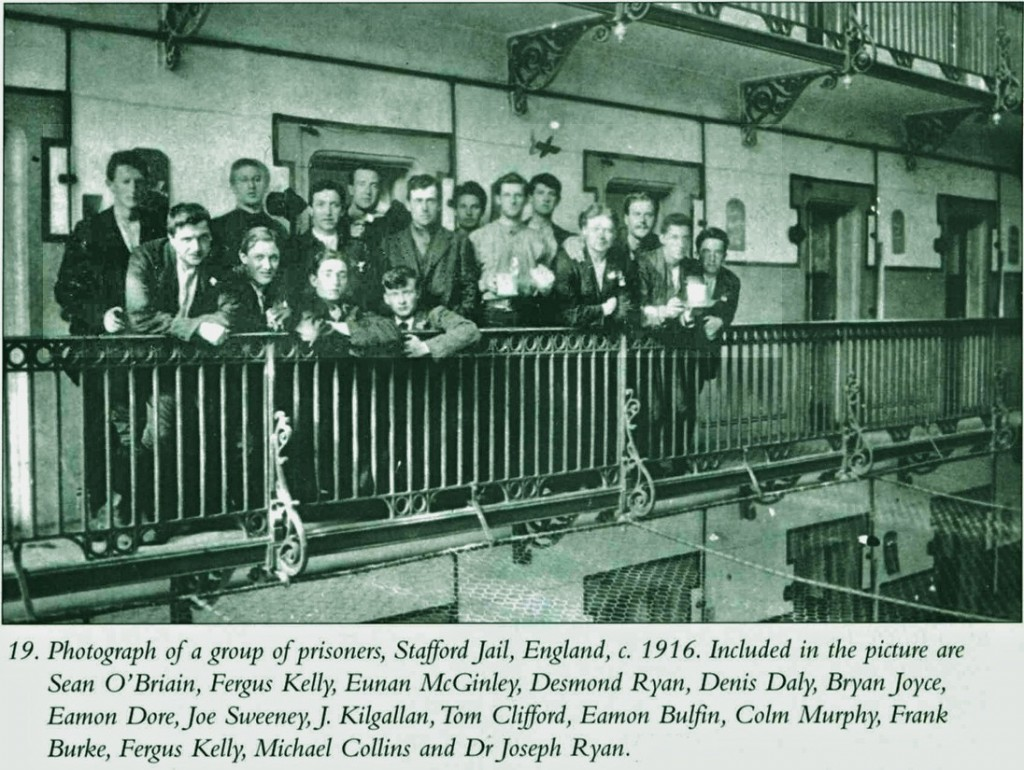
Joe Sweeney, with other 1916 rebels, including Michael Collins and fellow Donegal connection and St Enda's pupil Eunan Mc Ginley (son of PT Mc Ginley), in Stafford Jail, England, c 1916

== Irish revolutionary period ==
In 1918 Sweeney was suffering from influenza and decided to take a break from UCD and return to Donegal. While there he was appointed a commandant of the local Volunteers as well as being elected as a Sinn Féin MP for Donegal West in the 1918 Irish general election, defeating the sitting nationalist Hugh Law. Aged 21, had he taken his seat in the British Commons he would have been the youngest member of the house, however, as per Sinn Féin's abstentionist policy he did not and instead attended the meeting of the First Dáil, the new parliament of Ireland created by the Nationalists. He was the youngest Teachta Dála that day and he remains second youngest ever TD to date.

In March 1920 he was arrested and jailed by the British authorities, first being sent to Belfast before being transferred to Wormwood Scrubs, London. He was released in April 1920 following his participation in a mass hunger strike by Irish prisoners against their imprisonment. Following his release, he became Officer Commanding of the West Donegal Brigade of the Irish Republican Army and fought in the Irish War of Independence. During that time he rose through the ranks and became the commanding officer of the 1st Northern Division.

Following the end of the War of Independence and the signing of the Anglo-Irish Treaty, Sweeney chose the Pro-Treaty side in the Irish Civil War. In the lead-up to the civil war, he was involved in smuggling arms across the border to northern nationalists, which lead to clashes with British troops. During one such clash seven of his men were killed at Pettigo.

In 1921 he was one of six Sinn Féin candidates elected unopposed to the House of Commons of Southern Ireland for Donegal. Again, Sinn Féin did not attend and instead formed the Second Dáil. In 1922 he was re-elected as a Pro-Treaty Sinn Féin candidate for Donegal and participated in the 3rd Dáil.

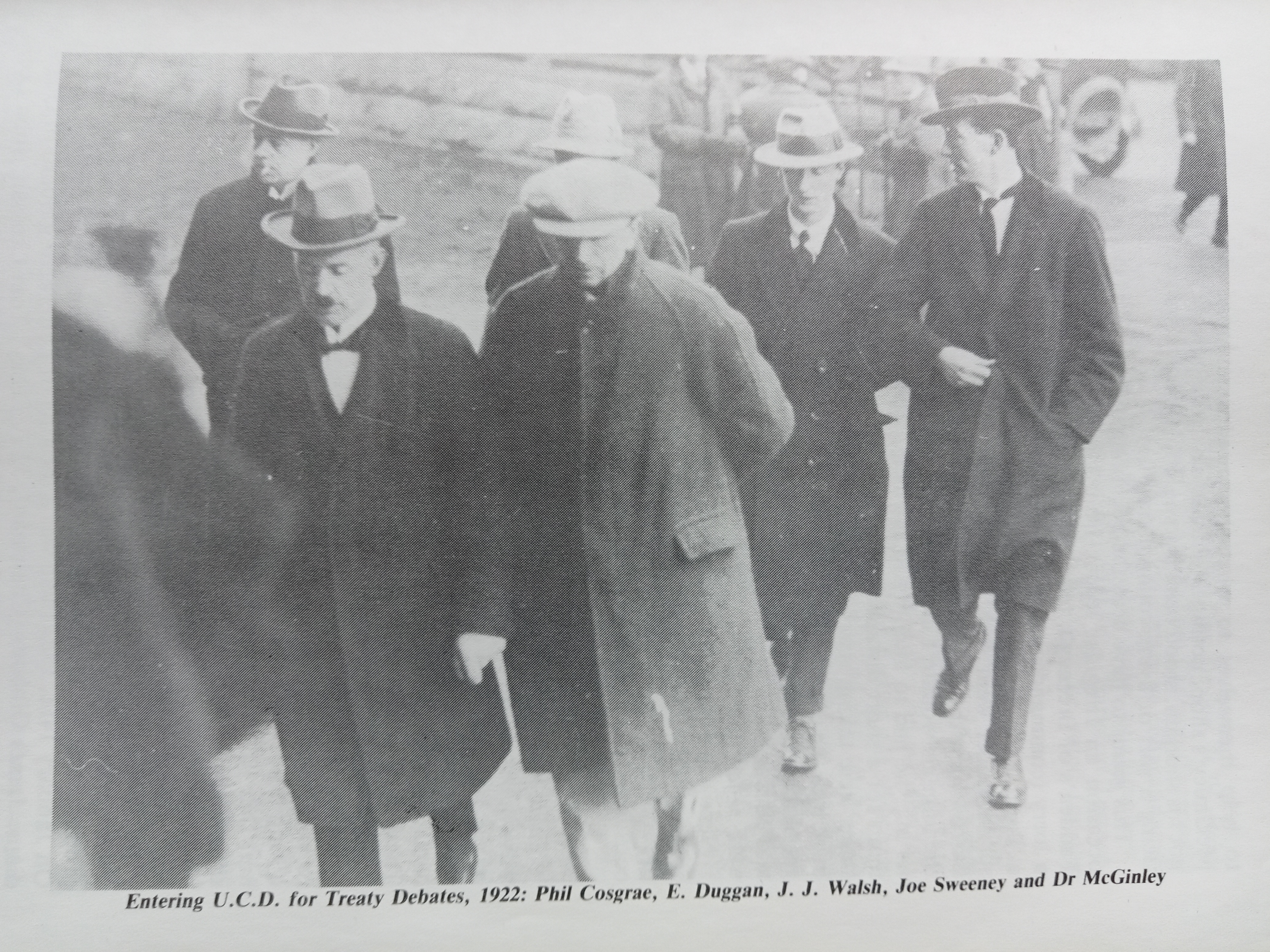
Entering UCD for the Treaty Debates, 1922. Phil Cosgrave, E. Duggan, J.J. Walsh, Joe Sweeney, and Dr JP McGinley.

During the Civil War, he was made a General in the newly formed National Army and placed in command of its units in the North-West of the Island. The period saw Sweeney ordered by the Irish Government to execute four captured Republicans, including a former friend, Charlie Daly. The men had been captured and tried under the public safety bill by which anyone who was caught bearing arms against the state could be put to death. The men were in captivity without sentencing for a long period until the killing of Captain Bernard Cannon in Creeslough, County Donegal forced the Government to react and they ordered the men to be executed. Before their executions on 14 March 1923, the four men had all been offered a reprieve if they signed a document worded 'Declaration": "I promise that I will not use arms against the Parliament elected by the Irish people, or the Government for the time being responsible to that Parliament, and that I will not support in any way such action. Nor will I interfere with the property or person of others."' All refused.

== Life in the Irish Free State ==
In 1923 he choose to leave politics and did not try to retain his seat as a TD. Instead, he remained in the National Army. In 1924 he was briefly acting Chief of Staff during the Irish Army Mutiny. By 1929 he had risen to the rank of Chief of Staff proper, a promotion that happened to coincide with the rise of Fianna Fáil to government. Many feared an outbreak of violence once again if Cumann na nGaedheal did not accept this change. Sweeney declared his view on the matter, stating that the will of the people would be protected under his command.

He had the honour of being the president of the 1916–1921 Club, open to anyone who fought in the war of independence regardless of stance taken in the civil war and one of whose principal aims was to foster reconciliation between the two opposing civil war factions, at the time of the 50th anniversary of the Easter rising in 1966.

Sweeney remained in the Army until his retirement in December 1940. He later became Secretary of the Irish Red Cross in the Republic of Ireland.

A devout catholic, he was a member of the third order of Saint Francis.

Sweeney died on 25 November 1980 aged 83 at St Vincent's private nursing home in Dublin, before being buried in a full military ceremony back in his native Burtonport.

British Army intelligence file for Joseph Sweeney

Parliament of the United Kingdom
Preceded by Hugh Law	Member of Parliament for Donegal West; 1918–1922	Constituency abolished
Preceded by Edward Stanley	Baby of the House; 1918–1919	Succeeded by Esmond Harmsworth
Oireachtas
New constituency	Teachta Dála for Donegal West; 1918–1921	Constituency abolished
New office	Baby of the Dáil; 1918–1923	Succeeded by ?
Military offices
Preceded by Seán Mac Eoin	Chief of Staff of the Defence Forces; 1929–1931	Succeeded by Michael Brennan

Dáil	Election	Deputy (Party)	Deputy (Party)	Deputy (Party)	Deputy (Party)	Deputy (Party)	Deputy (Party)	Deputy (Party)	Deputy (Party)
2nd	1921	Joseph O'Doherty (SF)	Samuel O'Flaherty (SF)	Patrick McGoldrick (SF)	Joseph McGinley (SF)	Joseph Sweeney (SF)	Peter Ward (SF)	6 seats 1921–1923	
3rd	1922	Joseph O'Doherty (AT-SF)	Samuel O'Flaherty (AT-SF)	Patrick McGoldrick (PT-SF)	Joseph McGinley (PT-SF)	Joseph Sweeney (PT-SF)	Peter Ward (PT-SF)	6 seats 1921–1923	
4th	1923	Joseph O'Doherty (Rep)	Peadar O'Donnell (Rep)	Patrick McGoldrick (CnaG)	Eugene Doherty (CnaG)	Patrick McFadden (CnaG)	Peter Ward (CnaG)	James Myles (Ind.)	John White (FP)
4th	1924 by-election	Joseph O'Doherty (Rep)	Peadar O'Donnell (Rep)	Patrick McGoldrick (CnaG)	Eugene Doherty (CnaG)	Patrick McFadden (CnaG)	Denis McCullough (CnaG)	James Myles (Ind.)	John White (FP)
5th	1927 (Jun)	Frank Carney (FF)	Neal Blaney (FF)	Daniel McMenamin (NL)	Eugene Doherty (CnaG)	Michael Óg McFadden (CnaG)	Hugh Law (CnaG)	James Myles (Ind.)	John White (FP)
6th	1927 (Sep)	Frank Carney (FF)	Neal Blaney (FF)	Archie Cassidy (Lab)	Eugene Doherty (CnaG)	Michael Óg McFadden (CnaG)	Hugh Law (CnaG)	James Myles (Ind.)	John White (FP)
7th	1932	Frank Carney (FF)	Neal Blaney (FF)	Brian Brady (FF)	Eugene Doherty (CnaG)	Daniel McMenamin (CnaG)	James Dillon (Ind.)	James Myles (Ind.)	John White (CnaG)
8th	1933	Joseph O'Doherty (FF)	Neal Blaney (FF)	Brian Brady (FF)	Hugh Doherty (FF)	Daniel McMenamin (CnaG)	James Dillon (NCP)	James Myles (Ind.)	Michael Óg McFadden (CnaG)
9th	1937	Constituency abolished. See Donegal East and Donegal West							

Dáil	Election	Deputy (Party)	Deputy (Party)	Deputy (Party)	Deputy (Party)	Deputy (Party)
21st	1977	Hugh Conaghan (FF)	Joseph Brennan (FF)	Neil Blaney (IFF)	James White (FG)	Paddy Harte (FG)
21st	1980 by-election	Hugh Conaghan (FF)	Clement Coughlan (FF)	Neil Blaney (IFF)	James White (FG)	Paddy Harte (FG)
22nd	1981	Constituency abolished. See Donegal North-East and Donegal South-West				

Dáil	Election	Deputy (Party)	Deputy (Party)	Deputy (Party)	Deputy (Party)	Deputy (Party)
32nd	2016	Pearse Doherty (SF)	Pat "the Cope" Gallagher (FF)	Thomas Pringle (Ind.)	Charlie McConalogue (FF)	Joe McHugh (FG)
33rd	2020	Pearse Doherty (SF)	Pádraig Mac Lochlainn (SF)	Thomas Pringle (Ind.)	Charlie McConalogue (FF)	Joe McHugh (FG)
34th	2024	Pearse Doherty (SF)	Pádraig Mac Lochlainn (SF)	Charles Ward (100%R)	Charlie McConalogue (FF)	Pat "the Cope" Gallagher (FF)
