= Abbeyfeale Aerodrome =

Airport in Abbeyfeale, Ireland

- IATA: none; ICAO: none

Summary
- Airport type: Private
- Serves: Abbeyfeale, Republic of Ireland
- Elevation AMSL: 300 ft / 91 m
- Coordinates: 52°23′45″N 9°20′25″W

Map
- Location in Ireland

Runways
Direction	Length		Surface
Direction	m	ft	Surface
09/27	690	2,264	Asphalt
- Source: OurAirports GoogleMaps

Abbeyfeale Aerodrome is a recreational airfield serving Abbeyfeale, a town in County Limerick in Ireland. It is 3 kilometres (2 mi) west-northwest of Abbeyfeale.

The runway has a 30 metres (98 ft) displaced threshold on each end.

Abbeyfeale is not a licensed airfield.

== See also ==
- Transport in the Republic of Ireland
- List of airports in the Republic of Ireland
