= Michael Brennan (Irish republican) =

Irish republican (1896–1986)

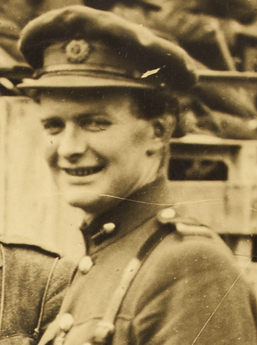
- Brennan during the civil war c. 1922
- Born: 2 February 1896; Meelick, County Clare, Ireland
- Died: 24 October 1986 (aged 90); Killiney, Dublin, Ireland
- Spouse: Bridget Conheady
- Military career
- Allegiance: Irish Republic; Irish Free State
- Branch: Irish Volunteers; Irish Republican Army; National Army; Irish Defence Forces
- Service years: 1913–1940
- Rank: Lieutenant General
- Commands: Chief of Staff; Inspector General; GOC Southern Command; GOC Limerick Command; OC 1st Western Division; OC East Clare Brigade
- Conflicts: Easter Rising; War of Independence; Civil War; The Emergency

Lieutenant-General Michael Brennan (2 February 1896 – 24 October 1986) was an Irish republican who became Chief of Staff of the Irish Defence Forces from October 1931 until January 1940.

Brennan was born in Meelick, County Clare, and joined the Irish Republican Brotherhood in 1911. Two years later, he helped form the Irish Volunteers in Limerick city and soon he was training men in and around Meelick. He took part in preparations for the Easter Rising and spent the next five years in and out of prison and trouble, becoming the OC East Clare Brigade in December 1918.

In May 1920, men under Brennan's command became overcome by fumes when thawing out gelegnite for an attack on Sixmilebridge police barracks. He blamed Ernie O'Malley for failing to warn his men of the dangers involved with such explosives but O'Malley pinned responsibility on Brennan. Brennan recalled how the Auxiliaries nearly captured him three nights in a row later in 1920. In May 1921, he was appointed OC 1st Western Division which included the Clare and south Galway brigades.

Brennan took the pro-Treaty side in the Irish Civil War. In July 1922, he secured Limerick and Clare and was appointed GOC Limerick Command in January 1923, and later Southern Command in February 1924. In 1925, he was appointed Adjutant-General, and Army Chief of Staff in 1931. His republican credentials and refusal to side with Eoin O'Duffy in opposing the new Fianna Fail secured his tenure for several years. During his tenure, the Army fell to its lowest strength and as war loomed he was unable to convince the government of the need to improve defences. In December 1940, he was removed as Chief of Staff and retired from military service.

Military offices
Preceded by Joseph Sweeney	Chief of Staff of the Defence Forces; 1931–1940	Succeeded by Daniel McKenna
