= Moyglare Airfield =

Private airfield in County Kildare, Ireland

- IATA: none; ICAO: EIMY

Summary
- Serves: Dublin, Kildare & Meath Ireland
- Elevation AMSL: 220 ft (67 m)
- Coordinates: 53°24′15″N 006°38′13″W
- Interactive map of Moyglare Airfield

Runways
Direction	Length		Surface
Direction	m	ft	Surface
07/25	675	1,312	bitumen
- Source: Website

Moyglare Airfield is a private airfield established in 2007. It is located 1.5 nautical miles (3 km; 2 mi) northwest of Maynooth (Irish: Maigh Nuad), a town in County Kildare, Ireland.

== Facilities ==
At an elevation of 220 feet (67 m) above mean sea level. It has one runway designated 07/25 with a bitumen surface measuring 675 by 10 metres (2,215 by 33 ft). Mogas is available on site. The airfield is mainly active over the summer months during daylight hours.
