= Parteen =

Village in County Clare, Ireland

Parteen An Pairtín
- Village
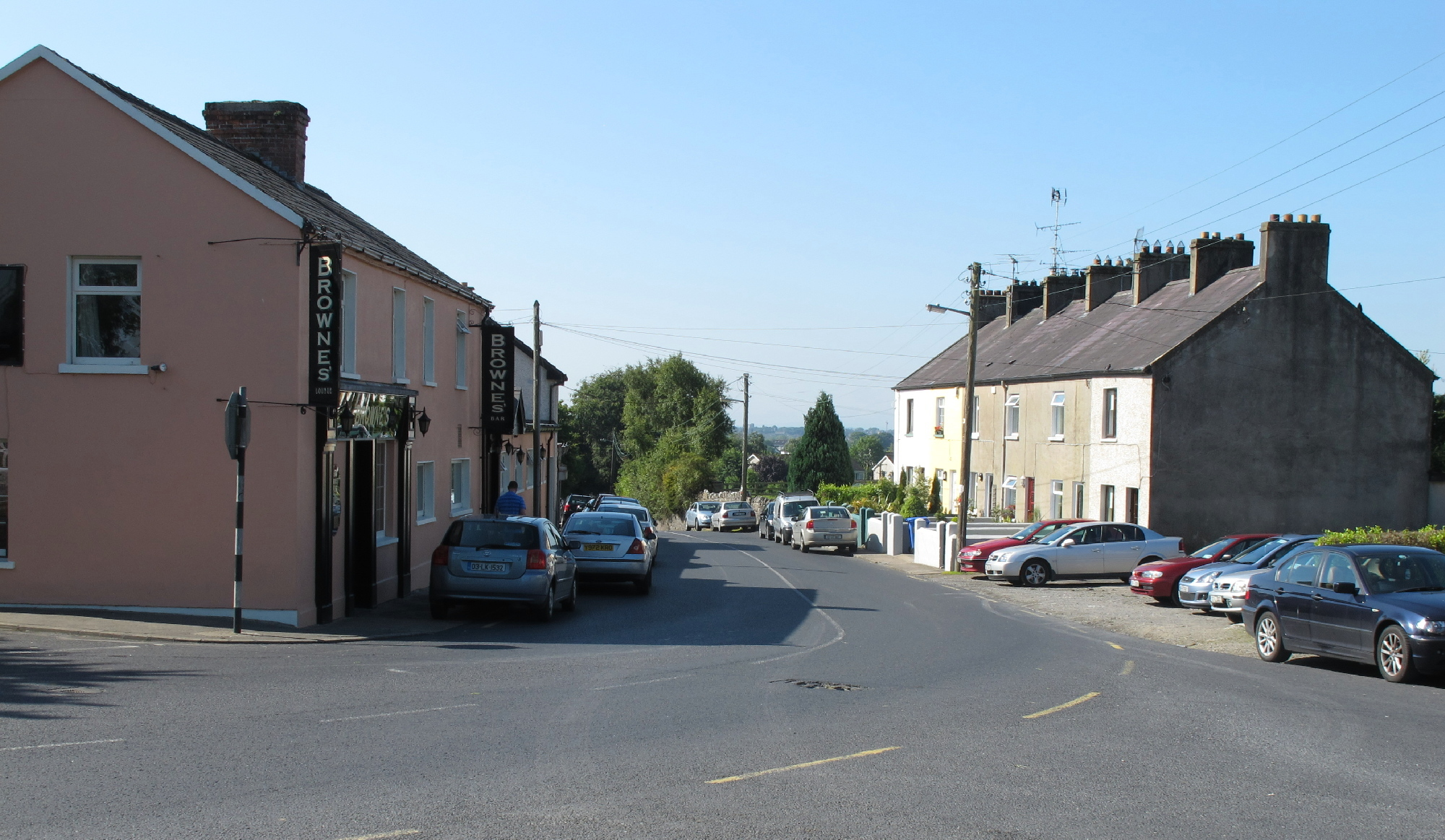
- The R464 road through the village

- Location in Ireland
- Coordinates: 52°41′47″N 8°36′55″W
- Country: Ireland
- Province: Munster
- County: County Clare

Population (2022)
  - Total: 889
- Time zone: UTC+0 (WET)
  - Summer (DST): UTC-1 (IST (WEST))

Parteen (Irish: An Pairtín) is a village in County Clare, Ireland. It is situated in the townland of the same name that is part of the civil parish of St Patrick's. It is also part of the ecclesiastical parish of Parteen-Meelick-Coonagh in the Roman Catholic Diocese of Limerick. The village has a large church (St Patrick's), three public houses, a national school, and one shop. It is within sight of the Ardnacrusha hydroelectric power station.

The village of Parteen was previously known as Ardnacrusha until the construction of the Ardnacrusha hydroelectric power station. In response to the naming of the power station, the inhabitants chose to rename their village to Parteen.

The village is just north of Limerick on the R464 road. It is on the left bank of the River Shannon near the suburb of Corbally.

Kilquane Graveyard is situated around the site of the church ruin in the parish of St. Patrick's in Parteen. It is located in the back of the Shannon Banks Estate in Corbally and is on the Clare bank of the Shannon.

The village had a pitch and putt course until 2021. It was also home to Parteen St. Nicholas' GAA which, in 2022, merged with neighbouring Meelick GAA to form Parteen/Meelick GAA.

== Notable people ==
- Paddy Lane, politician and Member of the European Parliament (MEP) from Quinpool, Parteen
- Joel Coustrain, footballer from Limerick who attended Parteen National School

== See also ==
- List of towns and villages in Ireland
