= Gowran Grange Airfield =

Aerodrome near Nass, County Kildare, Ireland

- IATA: none; ICAO: EIGN

Summary
- Airport type: Private
- Operator: Dublin Gliding Club
- Location: Naas, County Kildare
- Elevation AMSL: 490 ft / 149 m
- Coordinates: 53°10′40″N 006°38′08″W

Map
- Location of airfield in Ireland

Runways
Direction	Length		Surface
Direction	m	ft	Surface
03/21	472	1,548	Grass

Gowran Grange Airfield (ICAO: EIGN) is an airfield located 2.65 nautical miles (4.91 km; 3.05 mi) south-southeast of the town of Naas, County Kildare in Ireland. The airfield is one of two in County Kildare, with the other one being Kilrush Aerodrome. Gowran Grange has been a licensed airfield since the early 1930s, and home to Dublin Gliding Club since 1980.

== History ==
Baron Martin De Robeck, who farmed near Punchestown, Naas, owned a 40-acre field which had been a licensed airfield since the 1930s. His father had been an aviation enthusiast and he welcomed Dublin Gliding Club to Gowran Grange in the early 1970s as it was becoming impossible for them to continue operating out of Baldonnel Aerodrome (ICAO: EIME) due to increasing military activity by the Irish Air Corps at that airfield. The club experimented with flying from Gowran Grange while continuing to operate from Baldonnel between 1976-1979. The last flight from Baldonnel took place in November 1980 and Gowran Grange has been the club’s base ever since.

== Facilities ==
Gowran Grange Airfield lies at an elevation of 490 feet AMSL (149 metres). It has one runway, designated 03/21 with a grass surface measuring 472 by 20 m (1,549 by 66 ft).

== Incidents and accidents ==
- On 24 October 2010, a 1981 Schleicher ASK 21 glider, registered EI-GLB and owned by Dublin Gliding Club, was operating a short training flight in the early afternoon. The flight departed from Runway (RWY) 21 at Gowran Grange. The glider was towed to 3,000 ft and operated to the southwest of the airfield before returning to land on RWY 03, the same grass runway but in the opposite direction. The Student stated that the initial approach was high and he made turns to lose height. He unlocked the airbrakes, using up to half. Later in the approach the Instructor took control and side-slipped, which the Student had not experienced before. The Instructor said that the glider did not come out of the side-slip as he expected and by the time it did they were close to the ground. At 13:15 local time, the glider landed heavily in the touchdown area of RWY 03, 150 metres from the threshold. The aircraft bounced back up into the air, before touching down again 57 metres further down and to the right hand side of the runway in a right wing, nose down attitude. It then proceeded to rapidly rotate 180-degrees before coming to rest. The glider was substantially damaged, and fortunately neither occupant was injured. The official accident report was published by the Air Accident Investigation Unit Ireland in 2012 and is available.
