= Hugh Law (Cumann na nGaedheal politician) =

Irish politician (1872–1943)

Teachta Dála
- In office June 1927 – February 1932
- Constituency: Donegal

Member of Parliament
- In office 25 April 1902 – 14 December 1918
- Preceded by: James Boyle
- Succeeded by: Joseph Sweeney
- Constituency: West Donegal

Personal details
- Born: 28 July 1872 Dublin, Ireland
- Died: 2 April 1943 (aged 70) Dublin, Ireland
- Party: Cumann na nGaedheal
- Other political affiliations: Farmers' Party; Irish Parliamentary Party
- Spouse: Charlotte Stuart
- Children: 4
- Parent: Hugh Law (father)
- Education: University College, Oxford

Hugh Alexander Law (28 July 1872 – 2 April 1943) was an Irish nationalist politician. He represented constituencies in County Donegal as a Member of Parliament (MP) in the British House of Commons and later as a Teachta Dála (TD) in Dáil Éireann.

A barrister, he was the second son of Hugh Law, who had been Lord Chancellor of Ireland from 1881 to 1883, and his wife Helen White, and was educated in England at Rugby School and University College, Oxford.

He was returned as an Irish Parliamentary Party member of the Westminster parliament for West Donegal at an unopposed by-election in April 1902, and was unopposed at successive general elections. He retired at the 1918 general election, and the seat was won by Joseph Sweeney of Sinn Féin.

A supporter of the pro-war policy of John Redmond during World War I, he held a number of administrative positions in London: in the secretariat of the Ministry of Munitions (1915–1916), the news department of the Foreign Office (1916–1918), and the advisory council of the Ministry of Reconstruction (1918).

At the 1923 Irish general election he was an unsuccessful Farmers' Party candidate for the 5th Dáil in the Donegal constituency. He stood again as a Cumann na nGaedheal candidate at the June 1927 general election and was elected to the 6th Dáil. Law was re-elected at the September 1927 general election, but lost his seat at the 1932 general election, and did not stand again.

Parliament of the United Kingdom
Preceded by James Boyle	Member of Parliament for West Donegal; 1902–1918	Succeeded by Joseph Sweeney

Dáil	Election	Deputy (Party)	Deputy (Party)	Deputy (Party)	Deputy (Party)	Deputy (Party)	Deputy (Party)	Deputy (Party)	Deputy (Party)
2nd	1921	Joseph O'Doherty (SF)	Samuel O'Flaherty (SF)	Patrick McGoldrick (SF)	Joseph McGinley (SF)	Joseph Sweeney (SF)	Peter Ward (SF)	6 seats 1921–1923	
3rd	1922	Joseph O'Doherty (AT-SF)	Samuel O'Flaherty (AT-SF)	Patrick McGoldrick (PT-SF)	Joseph McGinley (PT-SF)	Joseph Sweeney (PT-SF)	Peter Ward (PT-SF)	6 seats 1921–1923	
4th	1923	Joseph O'Doherty (Rep)	Peadar O'Donnell (Rep)	Patrick McGoldrick (CnaG)	Eugene Doherty (CnaG)	Patrick McFadden (CnaG)	Peter Ward (CnaG)	James Myles (Ind.)	John White (FP)
4th	1924 by-election	Joseph O'Doherty (Rep)	Peadar O'Donnell (Rep)	Patrick McGoldrick (CnaG)	Eugene Doherty (CnaG)	Patrick McFadden (CnaG)	Denis McCullough (CnaG)	James Myles (Ind.)	John White (FP)
5th	1927 (Jun)	Frank Carney (FF)	Neal Blaney (FF)	Daniel McMenamin (NL)	Eugene Doherty (CnaG)	Michael Óg McFadden (CnaG)	Hugh Law (CnaG)	James Myles (Ind.)	John White (FP)
6th	1927 (Sep)	Frank Carney (FF)	Neal Blaney (FF)	Archie Cassidy (Lab)	Eugene Doherty (CnaG)	Michael Óg McFadden (CnaG)	Hugh Law (CnaG)	James Myles (Ind.)	John White (FP)
7th	1932	Frank Carney (FF)	Neal Blaney (FF)	Brian Brady (FF)	Eugene Doherty (CnaG)	Daniel McMenamin (CnaG)	James Dillon (Ind.)	James Myles (Ind.)	John White (CnaG)
8th	1933	Joseph O'Doherty (FF)	Neal Blaney (FF)	Brian Brady (FF)	Hugh Doherty (FF)	Daniel McMenamin (CnaG)	James Dillon (NCP)	James Myles (Ind.)	Michael Óg McFadden (CnaG)
9th	1937	Constituency abolished. See Donegal East and Donegal West							

Dáil	Election	Deputy (Party)	Deputy (Party)	Deputy (Party)	Deputy (Party)	Deputy (Party)
21st	1977	Hugh Conaghan (FF)	Joseph Brennan (FF)	Neil Blaney (IFF)	James White (FG)	Paddy Harte (FG)
21st	1980 by-election	Hugh Conaghan (FF)	Clement Coughlan (FF)	Neil Blaney (IFF)	James White (FG)	Paddy Harte (FG)
22nd	1981	Constituency abolished. See Donegal North-East and Donegal South-West				

Dáil	Election	Deputy (Party)	Deputy (Party)	Deputy (Party)	Deputy (Party)	Deputy (Party)
32nd	2016	Pearse Doherty (SF)	Pat "the Cope" Gallagher (FF)	Thomas Pringle (Ind.)	Charlie McConalogue (FF)	Joe McHugh (FG)
33rd	2020	Pearse Doherty (SF)	Pádraig Mac Lochlainn (SF)	Thomas Pringle (Ind.)	Charlie McConalogue (FF)	Joe McHugh (FG)
34th	2024	Pearse Doherty (SF)	Pádraig Mac Lochlainn (SF)	Charles Ward (100%R)	Charlie McConalogue (FF)	Pat "the Cope" Gallagher (FF)
