= Shannon FIR =

Flight information region of Ireland

Shannon FIR is the flight information region (FIR) for the country of Ireland. The Irish Aviation Authority is responsible for regulating Irish aviation, and has delegated the provision of air navigation services (including air traffic control services) to Airnav Ireland.

Its ICAO code is EISN.

Its boundaries are from surface to flight level (FL) 660. The class G airspace exists outside the control zones (CTRs – class C airspace) and control areas (CTAs - class A & C airspace), up to FL75. The high level (FL245-FL660) above the area around Donegal Co., is controlled by the Scottish Control (EGPX).

The Shannon FIR contains the SOTA (Shannon Oceanic Transition Area) and NOTA (North Oceanic Transition Area), as of the start of 2006. The airspace is class A airspace from FL55 to FL660.
