= J. J. Dalton =

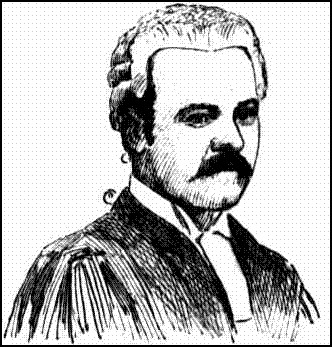
James Joseph Dalton in 1893

James Joseph Dalton (6 February 1861 – 10 July 1924) was an Irish nationalist Member of Parliament (MP) for West Donegal from 1890 to 1892.

James Joseph Dalton was born in Orange, New South Wales, of an old Irish family. He was the second son of James Dalton and Margaret Collins. His half-sister Johanna married John Redmond, later leader of the Irish Parliamentary Party, in 1883, and another sister (or half-sister), Eleanor, married John Redmond's brother Willie Redmond, also an Irish Party MP, in 1886. He was educated at St Stanislaus College, Bathurst, where he was captain of the football team.

A few years later he travelled to Ireland, and studied law at Trinity College Dublin. He was called to the Irish bar in 1888, and took part in the defence of activists during the Land War of the later 1880s. In 1892 he married Frances Delaney of Dublin.

He was elected unopposed to represent West Donegal at a by-election in May 1890, taking his seat in the House of Commons of the United Kingdom of Great Britain and Ireland. When the Irish Parliamentary Party split in December 1890 over the leadership of Charles Stewart Parnell, he supported Parnell. In this he must have been influenced to some extent by his family relationship with John and Willie Redmond, both of whom were leading Parnellites. In the general election of 1892 he contested South Meath as a Parnellite, obtaining 2,199 votes to the 2,212 of the Anti-Parnellite candidate Patrick Fullam, a losing margin of only 13 votes. He contested the result through a successful petition to the courts, alleging improper interference by the Catholic clergy. A new writ was issued, but in the ensuing by-election in February 1893, Dalton again lost narrowly, obtaining 2,638 votes while the new Anti-Parnellite candidate Jeremiah Jordan had 2,707. The course and outcome of Dalton's challenge to the clergy in 1892 were almost identical to those experienced by his Parnellite colleague Pierce Mahony at North Meath.

Returning to Australia, he practised as a barrister and acted as director of the family business. He ran for the New South Wales Legislative Assembly in 1895 as a Protectionist, contesting the seat of Orange.

== Notes ==
Parliament of the United Kingdom
Preceded by Patrick O'Hea	Member of Parliament for Donegal West; 1890 – 1892	Succeeded by Timothy Daniel Sullivan
