= Athboy Aerodrome =

Small airfield in northeastern Ireland

Athboy Aerodrome Ballyboy Airfield
- IATA: none; ICAO: EIMH

Summary
- Operator: Ballyboy House
- Serves: Athboy, County Meath, Ireland
- Elevation AMSL: 230 ft / 70 m
- Coordinates: 53°38′16″N 6°52′43″W
- Website: https://www.ballyboyairfield.com

Map
- Location of airport in Ireland

Runways
Direction	Length		Surface
Direction	m	ft	Surface
11/29	600	1,968	Tarmac
- Source: Ireland AIS

Athboy Aerodrome (ICAO: EIMH) is a small airfield located 2 nautical miles (4 km; 2 mi) northeast of Athboy (Irish: Baile Átha Buí), a town in County Meath (Contae na Mí), Ireland. This aerodrome is licensed by the Aeronautical Services Department of the Irish Aviation Authority. It is also known as Ballyboy Airfield.

The first plane to land in Ballyboy was in 1994, on a grass runway cut between two fields on the Ballyboy Farm of near east–west orientation.

== Facilities ==
Ballyboy is located outside controlled airspace and has a 600 metre tarmac runway, hangarage, and Avgas and Jet A-1 fuel systems, with mogas available by arrangement from Athboy town (2 km). It lies at an elevation of 230 feet (70 m) above mean sea level

Ballyboy has aircraft parking and limited maintenance facilities.

== Airfield information ==
GPS coordinates: N53°38'27 W006°52'72.

- 600m grass runway 29/11
- Avgas and Jet A-1 fuel
- Mogas available in Athboy town (2 Km)
- Licensed by the Aeronautical Services Department of the Irish Aviation Authority
