= Rathcoole, County Cork =

Village in County Cork, Ireland

Rathcoole Irish: Ráth Cúil Rathcool
- Village
- Location in Ireland
- Coordinates: 52.096°N 8.975°W
- Country: Ireland
- Province: Munster
- County: County Cork

Population (2022)
  - Total: 218
- Time zone: UTC+0 (WET)
  - Summer (DST): UTC-1 (IST (WEST))

Rathcoole, also spelled Rathcool (Irish: Ráth Cúil) is a village in the north west of County Cork, Ireland. It is in civil parish of Dromtarrife in the barony of Duhallow. Rathcoole is within the Dáil constituency of Cork North-West.

== Location and amenities ==
Rathcoole is located south of the River Blackwater in between Millstreet and Banteer. Rathcoole once had a train station on the Mallow–Tralee line but it closed in 1963. The nearest station is now Banteer railway station. There is a primary school located in the village called St. Brendan's national school.

== Sport ==
In Gaelic football and hurling, Dromtarriffe GAA club represents Rathcoole, and the club's sports ground is located just outside the village.

Rathcoole also has a soccer team called Rathcoole Rovers F.C.

== Aerodrome ==
Rathcoole Aerodrome is located 1 km north of the village, and there is a community-funded rescue helicopter located there.
