= Rathcoole Aerodrome =

Rathcoole Aerodrome Rathcoole Airfield
- IATA: none; ICAO: EIRT

Summary
- Operator: Rathcoole Flying Club
- Location: Rathcoole, County Cork, Ireland
- Elevation AMSL: 281 ft / 86 m
- Coordinates: 52°06′20″N 008°59′00″W
- Interactive map of Rathcoole Aerodrome

Runways
Direction	Length		Surface
Direction	m	ft	Surface
09/27	450	1,476	Grass
- Source: Ireland AIS

Rathcoole Aerodrome (ICAO: EIRT) is located in Rathcoole, 13 nautical miles (24 km; 15 mi) west of Mallow, in County Cork, Ireland. This aerodrome, which has a single grass-strip runway, is licensed by the Aeronautical Services Department of the Irish Aviation Authority. It is operated by Rathcoole Flying Club.

== Facilities ==
Rathcoole Aerodrome is at an elevation of 281 feet (86 m) above mean sea level. It has one runway, designated 09/27, which as a grass surface measuring 450 by 18 metres (1,476 by 59 ft).
