= Coonagh Aerodrome =

Aerodrome near Limerick city, Ireland

- IATA: none; ICAO: EICN

Summary
- Airport type: Private
- Operator: D. Lehane
- Serves: Limerick, Ireland
- Location: Coonagh
- Elevation AMSL: 6 ft / 1.8 m
- Coordinates: 52°39′59″N 008°40′55″W
- Interactive map of Coonagh Aerodrome

Runways
Direction	Length		Surface
Direction	m	ft	Surface
09/27	416	1,365	Bituminous
- Source: Ireland AIS

Coonagh Aerodrome (ICAO: EICN) is located near Coonagh, 2 nautical miles (3.7 km; 2.3 mi) west of the city of Limerick (Irish: Luimneach) in County Limerick (Contae Luimnigh), Ireland. This aerodrome is licensed by the Aeronautical Services Department of the Irish Aviation Authority. It is home to the Limerick Flying Club.

== Facilities ==
Coonagh Aerodrome lies at an elevation of 6 feet (1.8 m) above mean sea level. It has one runway designated 10/28 with a bituminous pavement measuring 416 by 9 metres (1,365 by 30 ft).

Extreme care must be taken when operating into Coonagh as the narrow runway may give the impression of a long runway. Coonagh lies very close to the Shannon CTR, just 1.5 NM (2.8 km; 1.7 mi). Shannon CTA over the field stretches from 1,000 ft (305 m) to 5,000 ft (1,524 m).

== Aircraft ==
Limerick Flying Club, based at Coonagh, currently operates three Tecnam P-2002-JF Sierra aircraft. There are also a number of privately owned aircraft based at Coonagh.
