= Meelick, County Clare =

Village near Limerick city, Ireland

Meelick Míleac
- Village
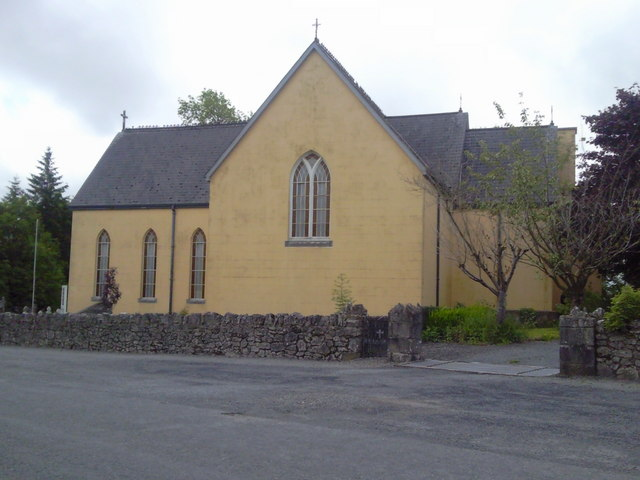
- Catholic church in Meelick (built c. 1850)

- Location in Ireland
- Coordinates: 52°42′4″N 8°39′11″W
- Country: Ireland
- Province: Munster
- County: County Clare
- Time zone: UTC+0 (WET)
  - Summer (DST): UTC-1 (IST (WEST))

Meelick (Irish: Míleac, meaning 'marshy land') is a small village and townland in County Clare, Ireland, situated a few kilometres north of Limerick city in the Mid-West Region.

== Location ==
Historically the village of Meelick was located in an area near Stonepark townland, where the church is located.

In the late 20th and early 21st century, new housing estates were developed in other areas, including at Ballycannon Heights, Elton Court, Kylevoher, Elmwood and Glen Abhainn. Other residential areas near Meelick include Cappantymore, Moneen, Stonepark (the original location of the village centre), Woodcock Hill and Ballycannon North.

== History ==
Evidence of ancient settlement in Meelick and Stonepark townlands include a number of ringfort and enclosure sites. Meelick Bridge, which spans the River Crompaun (Meelick Creek) between Clonconane and Meelick townlands, was built c. 1800. The parish church at Meelick, the Catholic Church of Saint John the Baptist in Stonepark, was built c. 1850.

From 1956, the area was home to 161 Hungarian refugees fleeing the Soviet repression in that country (see 1956 Hungarian Revolution). They were housed in Knockalisheen Camp, a disused army barracks dating from the Emergency. In 1957, complaints and disputes between the refugees and the authorities over living conditions and enforced idleness led to a mass hunger strike. After three days, the Dáil and the Irish Red Cross negotiated an end to the strike. By the summer of 1958, most of the refugees were allowed to move to Germany and the USA while a few chose to remain in Ireland. During their stay at the camp, the 51 children attended the local St Munchin's Girls' School where they were taught both the English and Irish languages. Since the 1990s, the camp has again been used to house asylum seekers.

== Amenities ==
The village has a local GAA club and a community centre. Meelick's national (primary) school, Scoil Mhuire, had an enrollment of over 90 pupils as of 2023. While the village also previously had a tavern and shop, these have since closed.

== People ==
- Michael Brennan (Lieutenant-General), the Irish Defence Forces Chief of Staff 1931–1940, was born in Meelick.

== See also ==
- List of towns and villages in Ireland
