= Second Salisbury ministry =

Government of the United Kingdom

- 1886–1892
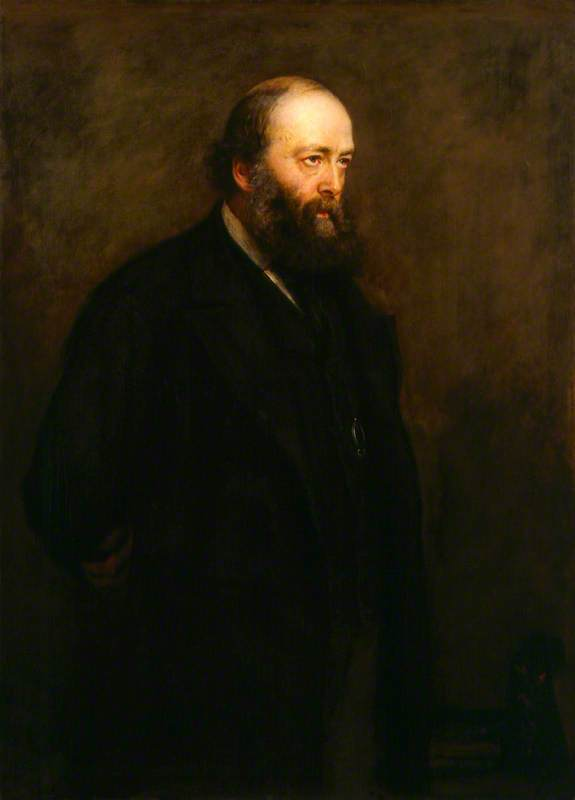
- Portrait of the Marquess of Salisbury by John Everett Millais (1883)
- Date formed: 25 July 1886
- Date dissolved: 11 August 1892

People and organisations
- Monarch: Victoria
- Prime Minister: Lord Salisbury
- Total no. of members: 113 appointments
- Member parties: Conservative Party
- Status in legislature: Minority dependent on Liberal Unionist support
- Opposition party: Liberal Party
- Opposition leaders: William Ewart Gladstone in the House of Commons; Lord Granville (1886–1891); Lord Kimberley (1891–1892) in the House of Lords

History
- Election: 1886 general election
- Outgoing election: 1892 general election
- Legislature terms: 24th UK Parliament; 25th UK Parliament lost a vote of confidence
- Predecessor: Third Gladstone ministry
- Successor: Fourth Gladstone ministry

Robert Gascoyne-Cecil, 3rd Marquess of Salisbury formed his second ministry, in an alliance with the Liberal Unionist Party, following the 1886 general election and his reappointment as the British prime minister by Queen Victoria.

== Cabinet ==
Cabinet members
Portfolio	Minister	Took office	Left office	Party
First Lord of the Treasury	Robert Gascoyne-Cecil, 3rd Marquess of Salisbury (head of ministry)	25 July 1886	11 August 1892	Conservative
First Lord of the Treasury	William Henry Smith	14 January 1887	6 October 1891	Conservative
First Lord of the Treasury	Arthur Balfour	6 October 1891	15 August 1892	Conservative
Leader of the House of Lords	Robert Gascoyne-Cecil, 3rd Marquess of Salisbury (head of ministry)	25 July 1886	11 August 1892	Conservative
Lord Chancellor	Hardinge Giffard, 1st Baron Halsbury	3 August 1886	11 August 1892	Conservative
Lord President of the Council	Gathorne Gathorne-Hardy, 1st Viscount Cranbrook	3 August 1886	18 August 1892	Conservative
Lord Privy Seal	George Cadogan, 5th Earl Cadogan	3 August 1886	11 August 1892	Conservative
Secretary of State for the Home Department	Henry Matthews	3 August 1886	15 August 1892	Conservative
Secretary of State for Foreign Affairs	Stafford Northcote, 1st Earl of Iddesleigh	3 August 1886	12 January 1887	Conservative
Secretary of State for Foreign Affairs	Robert Gascoyne-Cecil, 3rd Marquess of Salisbury (head of ministry)	14 January 1887	11 August 1892	Conservative
Secretary of State for the Colonies	Edward Stanhope	3 August 1886	14 January 1887	Conservative
Secretary of State for the Colonies	Henry Holland, 1st Baron Knutsford	14 January 1887	11 August 1892	Conservative
Secretary of State for War	William Henry Smith	3 August 1886	14 January 1887	Conservative
Secretary of State for War	Edward Stanhope	14 January 1887	11 August 1892	Conservative
Secretary of State for India	R. A. Cross, 1st Viscount Cross	3 August 1886	11 August 1892	Conservative
First Lord of the Admiralty	Lord George Hamilton	9 August 1886	11 August 1892	Conservative
Chancellor of the Exchequer	Lord Randolph Churchill	3 August 1886	14 January 1887	Conservative
Chancellor of the Exchequer	George Goschen	14 January 1887	11 August 1892	Liberal Unionist
Leader of the House of Commons	Lord Randolph Churchill	3 August 1886	14 January 1887	Conservative
Leader of the House of Commons	William Henry Smith	14 January 1887	6 October 1891	Conservative
Leader of the House of Commons	Arthur Balfour	6 October 1891	15 August 1892	Conservative
President of the Board of Trade	Frederick Stanley, Lord Stanley of Preston	3 August 1886	21 February 1888	Conservative
President of the Board of Trade	Sir Michael Hicks Beach, 9th Baronet	21 February 1888	11 August 1892	Conservative
Chancellor of the Duchy of Lancaster	Gathorne Gathorne-Hardy, 1st Viscount Cranbrook	3 August 1886	16 August 1886	Conservative
Chancellor of the Duchy of Lancaster	John Manners, 7th Duke of Rutland	16 August 1886	11 August 1892	Conservative
Chief Secretary for Ireland	Sir Michael Hicks Beach, 9th Baronet	5 August 1886	7 March 1887	Conservative
Chief Secretary for Ireland	Arthur Balfour	7 March 1887	9 November 1891	Conservative
Chief Secretary for Ireland	William Jackson	9 November 1891	11 August 1892	Conservative
Secretary for Scotland	Arthur Balfour	5 August 1886	11 March 1887	Conservative

=== Changes ===
- January 1887 a Liberal Unionist, George Goschen, joined the ministry, succeeding Churchill as Chancellor of the Exchequer.^{[C. K. 1975]} On the death of Lord Iddesleigh, Lord Salisbury succeeds him as Foreign Secretary. W.H. Smith succeeds Salisbury as First Lord of the Treasury. Edward Stanhope succeeds Smith as Secretary for War. Sir Henry Holland succeeds Stanhope as Colonial Secretary.
- February 1888 – Sir Michael Hicks Beach succeeds Lord Stanley of Preston as President of the Board of Trade.
- September 1889 – Henry Chaplin enters the Cabinet as President of the Board of Agriculture.
- October 1891 – Arthur Balfour succeeds the late William Henry Smith as First Lord of the Treasury and Leader of the House of Commons. William Jackson succeeds him as Chief Secretary for Ireland.

== List of ministers ==
Note: Cabinet members are listed in bold face.

Office	Name	Tenure
Prime minister (Note: The position of prime minister was not a formal ministerial office.); Leader of the House of Lords	Robert Gascoyne-Cecil, 3rd Marquess of Salisbury	25 July 1886 – 11 August 1892
First Lord of the Treasury	Robert Gascoyne-Cecil, 3rd Marquess of Salisbury	9 August 1886
First Lord of the Treasury	William Henry Smith (Note: Also served as Leader of the House of Commons.)	17 January 1887
First Lord of the Treasury	Arthur Balfour	October 1891
Chancellor of the Exchequer	Lord Randolph Churchill	3 August 1886
Chancellor of the Exchequer	George Goschen	14 January 1887
Parliamentary Secretary to the Treasury	Aretas Akers-Douglas	3 August 1886
Financial Secretary to the Treasury	William Jackson	3 August 1886
Financial Secretary to the Treasury	John Eldon Gorst	9 November 1891
Junior Lords of the Treasury	Sidney Herbert	9 August 1886 – 11 August 1892
Junior Lords of the Treasury	William Walrond (Note: Walrond inherited a baronetcy in 1889.)	9 August 1886 – 11 August 1892
Junior Lords of the Treasury	Sir Herbert Maxwell, 7th Baronet	9 August 1886 – 11 August 1892
Lord Chancellor	Hardinge Giffard, 1st Baron Halsbury	3 August 1886
Lord President of the Council	Gathorne Gathorne-Hardy, 1st Viscount Cranbrook	3 August 1886
Lord Privy Seal	George Cadogan, 5th Earl Cadogan (Note: Entered the Cabinet in April 1887.)	3 August 1886
Secretary of State for the Home Department	Henry Matthews	3 August 1886
Under-Secretary of State for the Home Department	Charles Stuart-Wortley	4 August 1886
Secretary of State for Foreign Affairs	Stafford Northcote, 1st Earl of Iddesleigh	3 August 1886
Secretary of State for Foreign Affairs	Robert Gascoyne-Cecil, 3rd Marquess of Salisbury	14 January 1887
Under-Secretary of State for Foreign Affairs	Sir James Fergusson, 6th Baronet	4 August 1886
Under-Secretary of State for Foreign Affairs	James Lowther	22 September 1891
Secretary of State for War	William Henry Smith	3 August 1886
Secretary of State for War	Edward Stanhope	14 January 1887
Under-Secretary of State for War	George Harris, 4th Baron Harris	4 August 1886
Under-Secretary of State for War	Adelbert Brownlow-Cust, 3rd Earl Brownlow	1 January 1890
Financial Secretary to the War Office	St John Brodrick	4 August 1886
Surveyor-General of the Ordnance (Note: Office abolished in 1888.)	Henry Northcote	4 August 1886
Secretary of State for the Colonies	Edward Stanhope	3 August 1886
Secretary of State for the Colonies	Henry Holland (Note: Holland was created Baron Knutsford on 23 February 1888.)	14 January 1887
Under-Secretary of State for the Colonies	Windham Wyndham-Quin, 4th Earl of Dunraven and Mount-Earl	3 August 1886
Under-Secretary of State for the Colonies	William Onslow, 4th Earl of Onslow	16 February 1887
Under-Secretary of State for the Colonies	Baron Henry de Worms	20 February 1888
Secretary of State for India	R. A. Cross, 1st Viscount Cross	3 August 1886
Under-Secretary of State for India	John Eldon Gorst	4 August 1886
Under-Secretary of State for India	George Curzon	9 November 1891
First Lord of the Admiralty	Lord George Hamilton	9 August 1886
Parliamentary and Financial Secretary to the Admiralty	Arthur Forwood	9 August 1886
Civil Lord of the Admiralty	Ellis Ashmead-Bartlett	9 August 1886
President of the Board of Agriculture	Henry Chaplin	9 September 1889
Chief Secretary for Ireland	Sir Michael Hicks Beach, 9th Baronet	5 August 1886
Chief Secretary for Ireland	Arthur Balfour	7 March 1887
Chief Secretary for Ireland	William Jackson	9 November 1891
Lord Lieutenant of Ireland	Charles Vane-Tempest-Stewart, 6th Marquess of Londonderry	3 August 1886
Lord Lieutenant of Ireland	Lawrence Dundas, 3rd Earl of Zetland	30 July 1889
Lord Chancellor of Ireland	Edward Gibson, 1st Baron Ashbourne	3 August 1886
Chancellor of the Duchy of Lancaster	Gathorne Gathorne-Hardy, 1st Viscount Cranbrook	3 August 1886
Chancellor of the Duchy of Lancaster	Lord John Manners (Note: Manners succeeded as the 7th Duke of Rutland on 4 March 1888.)	16 August 1886
President of the Local Government Board	Charles Ritchie	3 August 1886
Parliamentary Secretary to the Local Government Board	Walter Long	3 August 1886
Minister without Portfolio	Sir Michael Hicks Beach, 9th Baronet	7 March 1887 – 20 February 1888
Secretary for Scotland	Arthur Balfour (Note: Balfour entered the Cabinet in November 1886.)	5 August 1886
Secretary for Scotland	Schomberg Kerr, 9th Marquess of Lothian	11 March 1887
President of the Board of Trade	Frederick Stanley (Note: Stanley was created Baron Stanley of Preston on 27 August 1886.)	3 August 1886
President of the Board of Trade	Sir Michael Hicks Beach, 9th Baronet	21 February 1888
Parliamentary Secretary to the Board of Trade	Baron Henry de Worms	4 August 1886
Parliamentary Secretary to the Board of Trade	William Onslow, 4th Earl of Onslow	21 February 1888
Parliamentary Secretary to the Board of Trade	Alexander Bruce, 6th Lord Balfour of Burleigh	1 January 1889
Vice-President of the Committee on Education	Henry Holland	3 August 1886
Vice-President of the Committee on Education	William Hart Dyke	25 January 1887
Paymaster General	Frederick Lygon, 6th Earl Beauchamp	19 August 1886
Paymaster General	Adelbert Brownlow-Cust, 3rd Earl Brownlow	March 1887
Paymaster General	Victor Child Villiers, 7th Earl of Jersey	1889
Paymaster General	Robert Windsor-Clive, Baron Windsor	December 1890
Postmaster General	Henry Cecil Raikes	19 August 1886
Postmaster General	Sir James Fergusson, 6th Baronet	21 September 1891
First Commissioner of Works	David Plunket	5 August 1886
Attorney General	Richard Webster	5 August 1886
Solicitor General	Edward Clarke	6 August 1886
Judge Advocate General	William Thackeray Marriott	9 August 1886
Lord Advocate	John Macdonald	6 August 1886
Lord Advocate	James Robertson	27 October 1888
Lord Advocate	vacant	20 August 1891
Lord Advocate	Charles Pearson	1 October 1891
Solicitor General for Scotland	James Robertson	6 August 1886
Solicitor General for Scotland	Moir Tod Stormonth Darling	27 October 1888
Solicitor General for Scotland	Charles Pearson	31 October 1890
Solicitor General for Scotland	Andrew Murray	1 October 1891
Attorney-General for Ireland	Hugh Holmes	August 1886
Attorney-General for Ireland	John George Gibson	1887
Attorney-General for Ireland	Peter O'Brien	1888
Attorney-General for Ireland	Dodgson Hamilton Madden	1890
Solicitor-General for Ireland	John George Gibson	August 1886
Solicitor-General for Ireland	Dodgson Hamilton Madden	1888
Solicitor-General for Ireland	John Atkinson	1890
Solicitor-General for Ireland	Edward Carson	June 1892
Lord Steward of the Household	William Edgcumbe, 4th Earl of Mount Edgcumbe	16 August 1886
Lord Chamberlain of the Household	Edward Bootle-Wilbraham, 1st Earl of Lathom	5 August 1886
Vice-Chamberlain of the Household	William Legge, Viscount Lewisham	5 August 1886
Vice-Chamberlain of the Household	Brownlow Cecil, Baron Burghley	24 November 1891
Master of the Horse	William Cavendish-Bentinck, 6th Duke of Portland	9 August 1886
Treasurer of the Household	William Pleydell-Bouverie, Viscount Folkestone (Note: Folkestone succeeded as the 5th Earl of Radnor on 11 March 1889.)	5 August 1886
Treasurer of the Household	Lord Walter Gordon-Lennox	20 November 1891
Comptroller of the Household	Lord Arthur Hill	5 August 1886
Captain of the Gentlemen-at-Arms	George Barrington, 7th Viscount Barrington	5 August 1886
Captain of the Gentlemen-at-Arms	Robert St Clair-Erskine, 4th Earl of Rosslyn	24 November 1886
Captain of the Gentlemen-at-Arms	Charles Pelham, 4th Earl of Yarborough	11 August 1890
Captain of the Yeomen of the Guard	Algernon Keith-Falconer, 9th Earl of Kintore	5 August 1886
Captain of the Yeomen of the Guard	William Pery, 3rd Earl of Limerick	29 January 1889
Master of the Buckhounds	George Coventry, 9th Earl of Coventry	16 August 1886
Mistress of the Robes	Louisa Montagu Douglas Scott, Duchess of Buccleuch	5 August 1886
Lords-in-Waiting	William Onslow, 4th Earl of Onslow	5 August 1886 – 21 February 1887
Lords-in-Waiting	William Pery, 3rd Earl of Limerick	5 August 1886 – 29 January 1889
Lords-in-Waiting	John Henniker-Major, 5th Baron Henniker	5 August 1886 – 11 August 1892
Lords-in-Waiting	John Hope, 7th Earl of Hopetoun	5 August 1886 – 12 August 1889
Lords-in-Waiting	William Elphinstone, 15th Lord Elphinstone	5 August 1886 – 11 August 1892
Lords-in-Waiting	Dudley FitzGerald-de Ros, 23rd Baron de Ros	5 August 1886 – 11 August 1892
Lords-in-Waiting	William Waldegrave, 9th Earl Waldegrave	5 August 1886 – 11 August 1892
Lords-in-Waiting	Alexander Bruce, 6th Lord Balfour of Burleigh	21 February 1887 – 18 March 1889
Lords-in-Waiting	Charles Marsham, 4th Earl of Romney	5 February 1889 – 11 August 1892
Lords-in-Waiting	George Byng, 8th Viscount Torrington	18 March 1889 – 20 October 1889
Lords-in-Waiting	Victor Spencer, 3rd Baron Churchill	12 August 1889 – 11 August 1892
Lords-in-Waiting	Edward Fellowes, 1st Baron de Ramsey	10 March 1890 – 11 August 1892
Extra Lord in Waiting	Mortimer Sackville-West, 1st Baron Sackville	1 October 1876 – 1 October 1888

== Notes ==
Preceded by Third Gladstone ministry	Government of the United Kingdom; 1886–1892	Succeeded by Fourth Gladstone ministry
