= Second Gladstone ministry =

Members of the government of the United Kingdom from 1880–1885

- 1880–1885
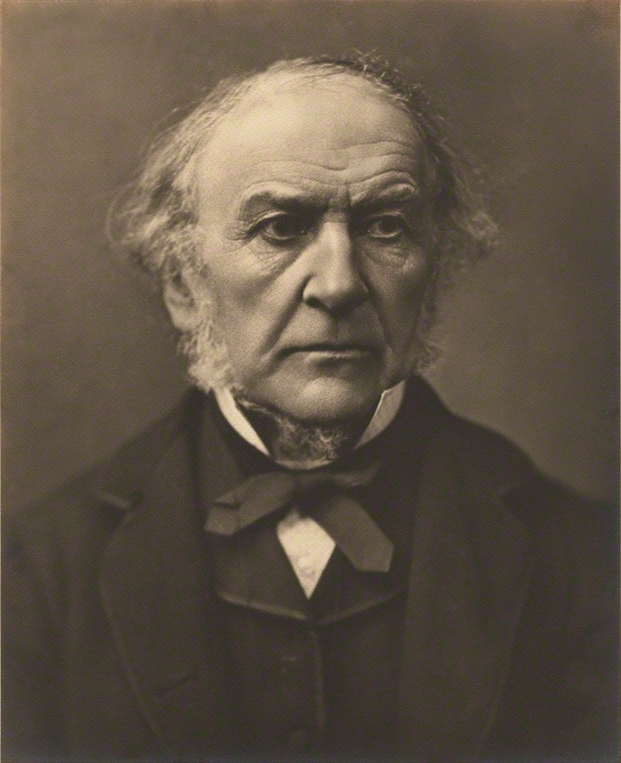
- Gladstone (1879)
- Date formed: 23 April 1880
- Date dissolved: 9 June 1885

People and organisations
- Monarch: Victoria
- Prime Minister: William Ewart Gladstone
- Total no. of members: 118 appointments
- Member party: Liberal Party
- Status in legislature: Majority
- Opposition party: Conservative Party
- Opposition leaders: Sir Stafford Northcote in the House of Commons; Lord Beaconsfield (1880–1881); Lord Salisbury (1881–1885) in the House of Lords

History
- Election: 1880 general election
- Legislature terms: 22nd UK Parliament lost a vote of confidence
- Predecessor: Second Disraeli ministry
- Successor: First Salisbury ministry

After campaigning against the foreign policy of the Beaconsfield ministry, William Ewart Gladstone led the Liberal Party to victory in the 1880 general election. The nominal leader of the Party, Spencer Cavendish, Marquess of Hartington, resigned in Gladstone's favour and Gladstone was appointed Prime Minister of the United Kingdom for a second time by Queen Victoria. He pursued a policy of parliamentary reform, but his government became wildly unpopular after the death of General Gordon in 1885. Gladstone was held responsible, and resigned, leaving the way free for the Conservatives under Robert Gascoyne-Cecil, 3rd Marquess of Salisbury to form a government.

== Cabinet; April 1880 – June 1885 ==
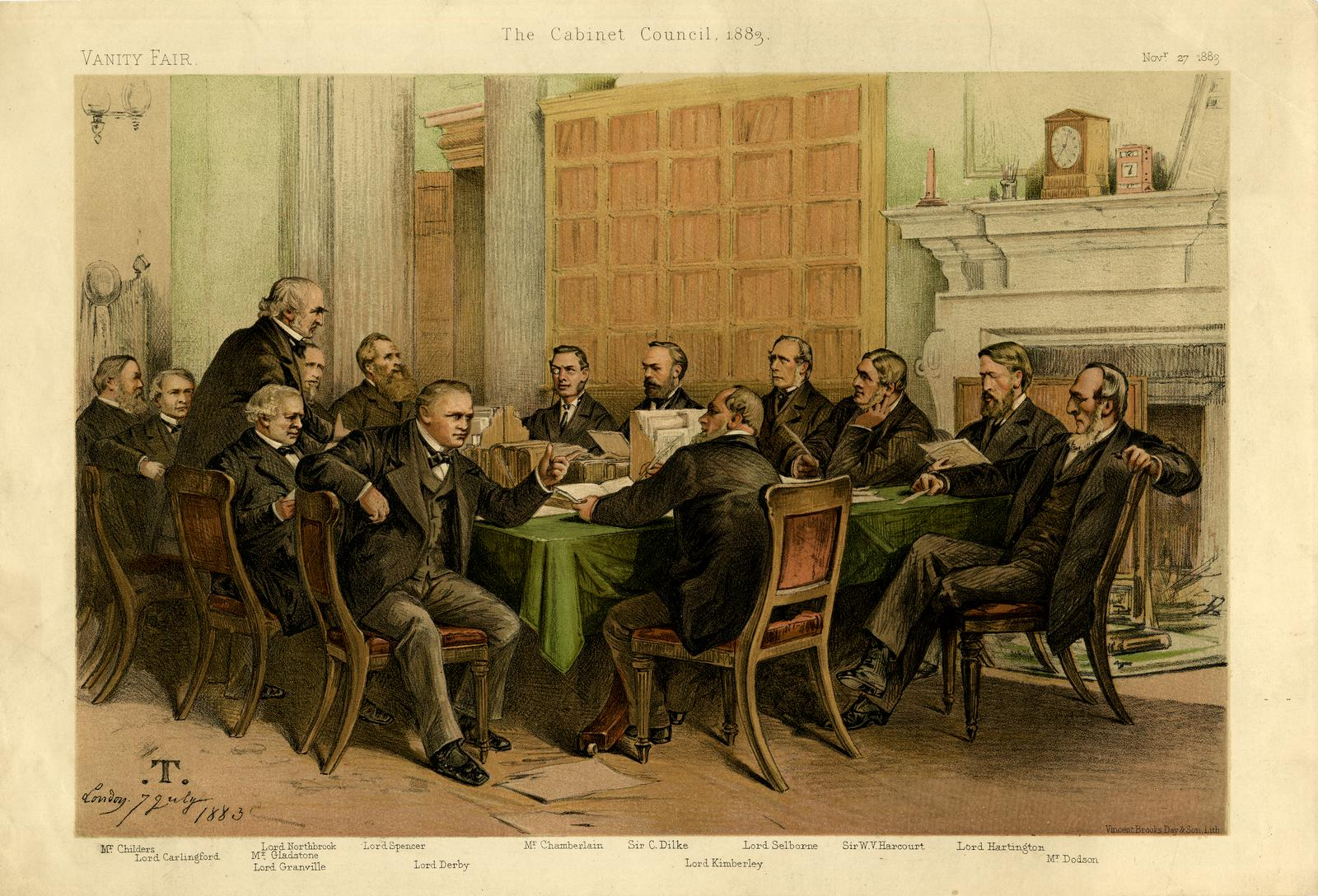
The Cabinet Council, 1883 by Théobald Chartran, published in Vanity Fair, 27 November 1883

Office	Name	Term
First Lord of the Treasury; Leader of the House of Commons	William Ewart Gladstone	April 1880 – June 1885
Lord Chancellor	Roundell Palmer, 1st Baron Selborne†	April 1880 – June 1885
Lord President of the Council	John Spencer, 5th Earl Spencer	April 1880 – March 1883
Lord President of the Council	Chichester Parkinson-Fortescue, 1st Baron Carlingford	March 1883 – June 1885
Lord Privy Seal	George Campbell, 8th Duke of Argyll	April 1880 – May 1881
Lord Privy Seal	Chichester Parkinson-Fortescue, 1st Baron Carlingford	May 1881 – March 1885
Lord Privy Seal	Archibald Primrose, 5th Earl of Rosebery	March 1885 – June 1885
Home Secretary	Sir William Harcourt	April 1880 – June 1885
Foreign Secretary; Leader of the House of Lords	Granville Leveson-Gower, 2nd Earl Granville	April 1880 – June 1885
Secretary of State for the Colonies	John Wodehouse, 1st Earl of Kimberley	April 1880 – December 1882
Secretary of State for the Colonies	Edward Stanley, 15th Earl of Derby	December 1882 – June 1885
Secretary of State for War	Hugh Childers	April 1880 – December 1882
Secretary of State for War	Spencer Cavendish, Marquess of Hartington	December 1882 – June 1885
Secretary of State for India	Spencer Cavendish, Marquess of Hartington	April 1880 – December 1882
Secretary of State for India	John Wodehouse, 1st Earl of Kimberley	December 1882 – June 1885
Chancellor of the Exchequer	William Ewart Gladstone	April 1880 – December 1882
Chancellor of the Exchequer	Hugh Childers	December 1882 – June 1885
First Lord of the Admiralty	Thomas George Baring, 1st Earl of Northbrook	April 1880 – June 1885
President of the Board of Trade	Joseph Chamberlain	April 1880 – June 1885
President of the Local Government Board	John George Dodson	April 1880 – December 1882
President of the Local Government Board	Sir Charles Dilke	December 1882 – June 1885
Chancellor of the Duchy of Lancaster	John Bright	April 1880 – July 1882
Chancellor of the Duchy of Lancaster	John Wodehouse, 1st Earl of Kimberley	July 1882 – December 1882
Chancellor of the Duchy of Lancaster	John George Dodson	December 1882 – October 1884
Chancellor of the Duchy of Lancaster	George Otto Trevelyan	October 1884 – June 1885
Postmaster General	Henry Fawcett	3 May 1880 – 6 November 1884
Postmaster General	George John Shaw-Lefevre	7 November 1884 – 9 June 1885
Chief Secretary for Ireland	William Edward Forster	April 1880 – May 1882
Chief Secretary for Ireland	successor not in the cabinet	
Lord Lieutenant of Ireland	John Spencer, 5th Earl Spencer	April 1882 – June 1885

†Created Earl of Selborne in 1882.

=== Notes ===
- William Gladstone served as both First Lord of the Treasury and Chancellor of the Exchequer between April 1880 and December 1882.
- The Earl Spencer served as both Lord President and Lord Lieutenant of Ireland between April 1882 and March 1883.
- The Earl of Kimberley served as both Colonial Secretary and Chancellor of the Duchy of Lancaster between July and December 1882.
- The Lord Carlingford served as both Lord Privy Seal and Lord President between March 1883 and March 1885.

=== Changes ===
- May 1881: Lord Carlingford succeeds the Duke of Argyll as Lord Privy Seal.
- April 1882: Earl Spencer becomes Lord Lieutenant of Ireland, but retains his seat in the cabinet and his position as Lord President.
- May 1882: William Edward Forster resigns as Chief Secretary for Ireland. His successor is not in the cabinet.
- July 1882: The Earl of Kimberley succeeds John Bright as Chancellor of the Duchy of Lancaster remaining also Colonial Secretary.
- December 1882: Hugh Childers succeeds William Gladstone as Chancellor of the Exchequer. Lord Hartington succeeds Childers as Secretary for War. Kimberley succeeds Hartington as Secretary for India. The Earl of Derby succeeds Kimberley as Colonial Secretary. John George Dodson succeeds Kimberley as Chancellor of the Duchy of Lancaster. Sir Charles Dilke succeeds Dodson as President of the Local Government Board.
- March 1883: Carlingford succeeds Spencer as Lord President, remaining also Lord Privy Seal. Spencer remains in the Cabinet as Lord Lieutenant of Ireland.
- October 1884: George Otto Trevelyan succeeds Dodson as Chancellor of the Duchy of Lancaster.
- March 1885: The Earl of Rosebery succeeds Carlingford as Lord Privy Seal. Carlingford remains Lord President. George John Shaw-Lefevre enters the cabinet as Postmaster-General.

== List of ministers ==
Cabinet members are listed in bold face.

Office	Name	Date
Prime Minister, First Lord of the Treasury and Leader of the House of Commons	**William Ewart Gladstone**	23 April 1880 – 9 June 1885
Chancellor of the Exchequer	**William Ewart Gladstone**	28 April 1880
Chancellor of the Exchequer	**Hugh Childers**	16 December 1882
Parliamentary Secretary to the Treasury	Lord Richard Grosvenor	28 April 1880
Financial Secretary to the Treasury	Lord Frederick Cavendish	28 April 1880
Financial Secretary to the Treasury	Leonard Courtney	8 May 1882
Financial Secretary to the Treasury	John Tomlinson Hibbert	12 December 1884
Junior Lords of the Treasury	Sir Arthur Hayter	5 May 1880 – 26 June 1882
Junior Lords of the Treasury	John Holms	5 May 1880 – 26 June 1882
Junior Lords of the Treasury	Charles Cecil Cotes	5 May 1880 – 9 June 1885
Junior Lords of the Treasury	Herbert Gladstone	24 August 1881 – 9 June 1885
Junior Lords of the Treasury	Robert Duff	26 June 1882 – 9 June 1885
Lord Chancellor	**Roundell Palmer, 1st Baron Selborne** (Note: Created Earl of Selborne on 30 December 1882.)	28 April 1880
Lord President of the Council	**John Spencer, 5th Earl Spencer**	28 April 1880
Lord President of the Council	**Chichester Parkinson-Fortescue, 1st Baron Carlingford**	19 March 1883
Lord Privy Seal	**George Campbell, 8th Duke of Argyll**	28 April 1880
Lord Privy Seal	**Chichester Parkinson-Fortescue, 1st Baron Carlingford**	2 May 1881
Lord Privy Seal	**Archibald Primrose, 5th Earl of Rosebery**	5 March 1885
Secretary of State for the Home Department	**Sir William Vernon Harcourt**	28 April 1880
Under-Secretary of State for the Home Department	Arthur Wellesley Peel	28 April 1880
Under-Secretary of State for the Home Department	Leonard Courtney	1 January 1881
Under-Secretary of State for the Home Department	Archibald Primrose, 5th Earl of Rosebery	8 August 1881
Under-Secretary of State for the Home Department	John Tomlinson Hibbert	7 June 1883
Under-Secretary of State for the Home Department	Henry Fowler	12 December 1884
Secretary of State for Foreign Affairs and Leader of the House of Lords	**Granville Leveson-Gower, 2nd Earl Granville**	28 April 1880
Parliamentary Under-Secretary of State for Foreign Affairs	Sir Charles Dilke, 2nd Baronet	28 April 1880
Parliamentary Under-Secretary of State for Foreign Affairs	Lord Edmond FitzMaurice	1 January 1883
Secretary of State for War	**Hugh Childers**	28 April 1880
Secretary of State for War	**Spencer Cavendish, Marquess of Hartington**	16 December 1882
Under-Secretary of State for War	Albert Parker, 3rd Earl of Morley	1 May 1880
Financial Secretary to the War Office	Henry Campbell-Bannerman	28 April 1880
Financial Secretary to the War Office	Arthur Hayter	13 May 1882
Surveyor-General of the Ordnance	Sir John Miller Adye	1 June 1880
Surveyor-General of the Ordnance	Henry Brand	17 January 1882
Secretary of State for the Colonies	**John Wodehouse, 1st Earl of Kimberley**	28 April 1880
Secretary of State for the Colonies	**Edward Stanley, 15th Earl of Derby**	16 December 1882
Under-Secretary of State for the Colonies	Mountstuart Elphinstone Grant Duff	29 August 1880
Under-Secretary of State for the Colonies	Leonard Courtney	6 August 1881
Under-Secretary of State for the Colonies	Evelyn Ashley	12 May 1882
Secretary of State for India	**Spencer Cavendish, Marquess of Hartington**	28 April 1880
Secretary of State for India	**John Wodehouse, 1st Earl of Kimberley**	16 December 1882
Under-Secretary of State for India	Henry Petty-Fitzmaurice, 5th Marquess of Lansdowne	29 April 1880
Under-Secretary of State for India	George Byng, Viscount Enfield	1 September 1880
Under-Secretary of State for India	John Kynaston Cross	16 January 1883
First Lord of the Admiralty	**Thomas Baring, 1st Earl of Northbrook**	28 April 1880
Parliamentary Secretary to the Admiralty	George Shaw-Lefevre	28 April 1880
Parliamentary Secretary to the Admiralty	George Trevelyan	29 November 1880
Parliamentary Secretary to the Admiralty	Henry Campbell-Bannerman	10 May 1882
Parliamentary Secretary to the Admiralty	Sir Thomas Brassey	23 October 1884
Civil Lord of the Admiralty	Thomas Brassey	12 May 1880
Civil Lord of the Admiralty	George Wightwick Rendel	22 July 1882
Chief Secretary for Ireland	**William Edward Forster**	30 April 1880
Chief Secretary for Ireland	Lord Frederick Cavendish	6 May 1882
Chief Secretary for Ireland	George Trevelyan	9 May 1882
Chief Secretary for Ireland	Henry Campbell-Bannerman	23 October 1884
Lord Lieutenant of Ireland	Francis Cowper, 7th Earl Cowper	4 May 1880
Lord Lieutenant of Ireland	**John Spencer, 5th Earl Spencer**	4 May 1882
Chancellor of the Duchy of Lancaster	**John Bright**	28 April 1880
Chancellor of the Duchy of Lancaster	**John Wodehouse, 1st Earl of Kimberley**	25 July 1882
Chancellor of the Duchy of Lancaster	**John George Dodson**	28 December 1882
Chancellor of the Duchy of Lancaster	**George Trevelyan**	29 October 1884
President of the Local Government Board	**John George Dodson**	3 May 1880
President of the Local Government Board	**Sir Charles Dilke, 2nd Baronet**	28 December 1882
Parliamentary Secretary to the Local Government Board	John Tomlinson Hibbert	3 May 1880
Parliamentary Secretary to the Local Government Board	George W. E. Russell	7 June 1883
Postmaster-General	Henry Fawcett	3 May 1880
Postmaster-General	**George Shaw-Lefevre**	7 November 1884
President of the Board of Trade	**Joseph Chamberlain**	3 May 1880
Parliamentary Secretary to the Board of Trade	Evelyn Ashley	29 April 1880
Parliamentary Secretary to the Board of Trade	John Holms	15 May 1882
First Commissioner of Works	William Patrick Adam	3 May 1880
First Commissioner of Works	George Shaw-Lefevre	29 November 1881
First Commissioner of Works	**Archibald Primrose, 5th Earl of Rosebery**	13 February 1885
Vice-President of the Committee on Education	A. J. Mundella	3 May 1880
Paymaster General	George Glyn, 2nd Baron Wolverton	24 May 1880
Attorney General	Sir Henry James	3 May 1880
Solicitor General	Sir Farrer Herschell	3 May 1880
Judge Advocate General	George Osborne Morgan	7 May 1880
Lord Advocate	John McLaren	5 May 1880
Lord Advocate	John Balfour	19 August 1881
Solicitor General for Scotland	John Balfour	6 May 1880
Solicitor General for Scotland	Alexander Asher	19 August 1881
Attorney General for Ireland	Hugh Law	10 May 1880
Attorney General for Ireland	William Moore Johnson	17 November 1881
Attorney General for Ireland	Andrew Marshall Porter	3 January 1883
Attorney General for Ireland	John Naish	19 December 1883
Attorney General for Ireland	Samuel Walker	1885
Solicitor General for Ireland	William Moore Johnson	24 May 1880
Solicitor General for Ireland	Andrew Marshall Porter	18 November 1881
Solicitor General for Ireland	John Naish	9 January 1883
Solicitor General for Ireland	Samuel Walker	19 December 1883
Solicitor General for Ireland	Hugh Hyacinth O'Rorke MacDermot	1885
Lord Steward of the Household	John Townshend, 1st Earl Sydney	3 May 1880
Lord Chamberlain of the Household	Valentine Browne, 4th Earl of Kenmare	3 May 1880
Vice-Chamberlain of the Household	Lord Charles Bruce	3 May 1880
Master of the Horse	Hugh Grosvenor, 1st Duke of Westminster	3 May 1880
Treasurer of the Household	Gavin Campbell, 7th Earl of Breadalbane	3 May 1880
Comptroller of the Household	William Edwardes, 4th Baron Kensington	3 May 1880
Captain of the Gentlemen-at-Arms	Alexander Duff, 6th Earl Fife	3 May 1880
Captain of the Gentlemen-at-Arms	Charles Gordon, 11th Marquess of Huntly	21 January 1881
Captain of the Gentlemen-at-Arms	Charles Wynn-Carington, 3rd Baron Carrington	27 June 1881
Captain of the Yeomen of the Guard	William Monson, 7th Baron Monson	3 May 1880
Master of the Buckhounds	Richard Boyle, 9th Earl of Cork	3 May 1880
Mistress of the Robes	Elizabeth Russell, Duchess of Bedford	3 May 1880
Mistress of the Robes	Anne Innes-Ker, Duchess of Roxburghe	11 January 1883
Lords in Waiting	Frederick Methuen, 2nd Baron Methuen	10 May 1880 – 9 June 1885
Lords in Waiting	Lawrence Dundas, 3rd Earl of Zetland	10 May 1880 – 14 September 1880
Lords in Waiting	William Hare, 3rd Earl of Listowel	10 May 1880 – 14 September 1880
Lords in Waiting	Thomas Lister, 4th Baron Ribblesdale	10 May 1880 – 9 June 1885
Lords in Waiting	Charles Hanbury-Tracy, 4th Baron Sudeley	10 May 1880 – 9 June 1885
Lords in Waiting	Arthur Wrottesley, 3rd Baron Wrottesley	10 May 1880 – 9 June 1885
Lords in Waiting	George Byng, Viscount Enfield	20 May 1880 – 1 September 1880
Lords in Waiting	George Byng, 7th Viscount Torrington (Note: Permanent.)	23 June 1859 – 27 April 1884
Lords in Waiting	John William Ramsay, 13th Earl of Dalhousie	14 September 1880 – 9 June 1885
Lords in Waiting	William Mansfield, 2nd Baron Sandhurst	14 September 1880 – 9 June 1885
Lords in Waiting	Thomas Hovell-Thurlow-Cumming-Bruce, 5th Baron Thurlow	14 September 1880 – 9 June 1885
Lords in Waiting	Alexander Hood, 1st Viscount Bridport (1814-1904)	30 June 1884 – 18 February 1901
Extra Lord in Waiting	Mortimer Sackville-West, 1st Baron Sackville	1 October 1876 – 1 October 1888

Notes

Preceded by Second Disraeli ministry	Government of the United Kingdom; 1880–1885	Succeeded by First Salisbury ministry
