= Gerald Fitzgibbon =

Irish judge and politician (1866–1942)

Judge of the Supreme Court
- In office 11 March 1924 – 23 July 1938
- Nominated by: Government of Ireland
- Appointed by: Tim Healy

Teachta Dála
- In office May 1921 – August 1923
- Constituency: Dublin University

Personal details
- Born: 8 October 1866 Dublin, Ireland
- Died: 6 December 1942 (aged 76) Dublin, Ireland
- Education: Clifton College; Trinity College Dublin; King's Inns

Gerald Fitzgibbon (8 October 1866 – 6 December 1942) was an Irish judge who served on the Supreme Court from 1924 to 1938. He was also elected for the Dublin University constituency at the 1921 and 1922 Irish elections. Following the 1921 elections, he sat in the House of Commons of Southern Ireland rather than the 2nd Dáil; after the 1922 election, he served in the 3rd Dáil.

== Early life and education ==
Fitzgibbon was born in Dublin in 1866, into an Anglican family. He was the eldest son of Gerald Fitzgibbon and Margaret Anne Fitzgerald. He was educated at Clifton College, Bristol, and Trinity College Dublin, where he took his degree of Bachelor of Arts. He was called to the Irish Bar in 1887, practised on the Munster Circuit, became a King's Counsel in 1908, and a Bencher of the King's Inns in 1912.

Fitzgibbon came from a noted legal family, his grandfather, Gerald Fitzgibbon, was a Queen's Counsel and Master in Chancery and his father, also Gerald Fitzgibbon, was a Lord Justice of the pre-independence Irish Court of Appeal: along with Christopher Palles and Hugh Holmes, the second Gerald Fitzgibbon was credited with making the Court of Appeal a tribunal whose judgements are still quoted with respect today. Mr. Justice Fitzgibbon through his mother was the grandson of Francis Alexander FitzGerald, Baron of the Court of Exchequer.

== Political career ==
He was elected unopposed to the House of Commons of Southern Ireland at the 1921 elections, representing the Dublin University constituency as an Independent Unionist, and acted as Speaker at its single session, with only four representatives attending. As a unionist he did not participate in the Second Dáil. He was re-elected for the same constituency at the 1922 general election and became a member of the 3rd Dáil. He did not contest the 1923 general election.

== Judicial career ==
In 1924, the forced retirement of almost all the senior judges of the former regime made the selection of suitable replacements a serious issue. Hugh Kennedy, the new Chief Justice of Ireland, recommended Fitzgibbon as a judge of the Supreme Court of Ireland simply on account of his legal ability, despite their serious differences on political issues, which Hogan refers to as a clash between Kennedy's "enthusiastic nationalism" and Fitzgibbon's "pessimistic scepticism".

=== Conflict with Hugh Kennedy ===
Kennedy soon came to regret his decision to recommend Fitzgibbon for appointment to the bench. Kennedy's diary records the increasing tension between the two men. Although Fitzgibbon was a Protestant Unionist, his friends insisted that he was by no means opposed to the new regime and indeed if he had been, he would hardly have accepted high office in it. However, he seems to have become deeply disillusioned with the increasingly Roman Catholic Irish Free State, and by 1929, he and Chief Justice Kennedy are said to have regarded each other with deep suspicion.

The tension came to a head in 1935, when Fitzgibbon was in the majority in State (Ryan) v Lennon; over Kennedy's strong dissenting judgment, he found that the Constitution of the Irish Free State contained provisions for its own amendment which allowed for the suspension of the most basic human rights.

In Re Westby in 1934, on the straightforward question of whether a Protestant ward of court should or should not be educated at an English public school, Chief Justice Kennedy's decision that the boy should be educated in Ireland was overruled by the Supreme Court of the Irish Free State, presided over by Fitzgibbon. Kennedy regarded Fitzgibbon's judgment as a personal attack on him.

=== Later years on the Supreme Court ===
He took some interest in the enactment of the 1937 Constitution of Ireland and made some suggestions on the procedure for referring a Bill to the Supreme Court under Article 26 by the President of Ireland as a reserve power.

Despite his obvious unhappiness in his professional life, he remained on the Supreme Court of Ireland until he reached retirement age in 1938; Chief Justice Kennedy believed that his somewhat unsatisfactory pension arrangements made Fitzgibbon cling to an office he had come to despise. Hogan points out that in this regard at least Fitzgibbon had good reason to be bitter with his treatment by the Government, because he was required on age grounds to retire 9 months before he qualified for the full amount, he seems to have received a pension equivalent to only 42% of his salary.

== Arms ==
Coat of arms of Gerald Fitzgibbon
Motto Nil Admirari (Let nothing astonish you)

Dáil	Election	Deputy (Party)	Deputy (Party)	Deputy (Party)	Deputy (Party)
1st	1918	Arthur Samuels (U)	Robert Woods (Ind U)	2 seats under 1918 Act	
1st	1919 by-election	William Jellett (U)	Robert Woods (Ind U)	2 seats under 1918 Act	
2nd	1921	Ernest Alton (Ind U)	James Craig (Ind U)	William Thrift (Ind U)	Gerald Fitzgibbon (Ind U)
3rd	1922	Ernest Alton (Ind.)	James Craig (Ind.)	William Thrift (Ind.)	Gerald Fitzgibbon (Ind.)
4th	1923	Ernest Alton (Ind.)	James Craig (Ind.)	William Thrift (Ind.)	3 seats from 1923
5th	1927 (Jun)	Ernest Alton (Ind.)	James Craig (Ind.)	William Thrift (Ind.)	3 seats from 1923
6th	1927 (Sep)	Ernest Alton (Ind.)	James Craig (Ind.)	William Thrift (Ind.)	3 seats from 1923
7th	1932	Ernest Alton (Ind.)	James Craig (Ind.)	William Thrift (Ind.)	3 seats from 1923
8th	1933	Ernest Alton (Ind.)	James Craig (Ind.)	William Thrift (Ind.)	3 seats from 1923
8th	1933 by-election	Ernest Alton (Ind.)	Robert Rowlette (Ind.)	William Thrift (Ind.)	3 seats from 1923
