= John Naish (judge) =

Irish judge

John Naish, PC (Ire), QC (15 August 1841 – 17 August 1890) was an Irish lawyer and judge, who held a number of senior offices, including Lord Chancellor of Ireland.

== Early life ==
Born in Limerick on 15 August 1841, son of Carroll Naish of Ballycullen and his second wife Anne Margaret Carroll or O'Carroll, Naish was educated at Clongowes Wood School and Trinity College Dublin. He was an outstanding student, gaining numerous distinctions in mathematics, physics and natural science, as well as law. He got his BA in mathematics in 1862.

== Early career ==
He was called to the Irish Bar in 1865, and practised on the Munster Circuit, becoming a QC in 1880. His reputation as a barrister was mixed: he was considered too nervous and retiring to be a good advocate, and disliked the rough-and-tumble of Court practice but hard work and academic brilliance compensated for this. He appeared in the celebrated libel action brought by Canon O'Keeffe against Cardinal Cullen (who had placed the Canon under an interdict) and co-wrote with the future Mr. Justice Edmund Bewley an influential textbook on the Common Law Procedure Acts.

== Law officer ==
He became Law Adviser to the Lord Lieutenant of Ireland (a deputy to the two senior law officers) in 1880. The office had become a very onerous one and its holder was often criticised for its excessively political nature since one of the Law Adviser's responsibilities was to advise magistrates on how to deal with proceedings with a political element. Naish is credited with having advised that magistrates in dealing with the Irish National Land League should rely on a fourteenth-century statute, the Justices of the Peace Act 1361 (34 Edw. 3. c. 1) to imprison those who could not find sureties for their good behaviour. This was a misinterpretation of the statute, which was clearly aimed only at cases of riot. These concerns about his obviously political conduct may explain why the office of Law Adviser was left vacant after his promotion to higher office.

== Judge ==
He was Solicitor-General for Ireland from January 1883 and Attorney-General for Ireland from December 1883. He stood for the House of Commons at Mallow as the Government candidate in 1883, but in the fraught political atmosphere which followed the Phoenix Park murders, he was crushingly defeated by William O'Brien. He was appointed to the Privy Council of Ireland in 1885 and served as Lord Chancellor of Ireland from May to July 1885 and again from February to June 1886; he was a Lord Justice of the Irish Court of Appeal 1885-6 and 1886–90.

== Death and family ==
Naish's health failed when he was still in his late forties: he travelled to the Continent in hope of a cure, but died at the German spa town of Bad Ems on 17 August 1890, two days after his forty-ninth birthday, and was buried there. His memorial can still be seen.

He married Maud Dease of County Westmeath and they had three children. J. Carrol Naish, the Hollywood actor, was his great nephew, the grandson of his elder half-brother Carroll Naish.

== Reputation ==
Delaney, in his biography of Christopher Palles, calls Naish an outstanding judge, even in an age when the Irish judiciary included such eminent figures as Christopher Palles himself, Gerald FitzGibbon, and Hugh Holmes. Elrington Ball, on the other hand, thought him a poor choice as Lord Chancellor: in Ball's view, Naish was a good academic lawyer but an unsuccessful barrister and a failure as a politician. As a Roman Catholic, however, he was an acceptable choice of Chancellor to Nationalists. The Dictionary of National Biography praises him as a brilliant academic, and while accepting that he had his faults as a barrister, agrees with Delaney that he was a great judge, perhaps the most eminent Irish judge of his time.

Legal offices
Preceded by Andrew Porter	Solicitor-General for Ireland; 1883	Succeeded by Samuel Walker
Preceded by Andrew Porter	Attorney-General for Ireland; 1883 – 1885	Succeeded by Samuel Walker
Political offices
Preceded by Sir Edward Sullivan, Bt	Lord Chancellor of Ireland; May–July 1885	Succeeded by The Lord Ashbourne
Preceded by The Lord Ashbourne	Lord Chancellor of Ireland; Feb-June 1886	Succeeded by The Lord Ashbourne
