= First Salisbury ministry =

Government of the United Kingdom

- Caretaker government of the United Kingdom
- 1885–1886
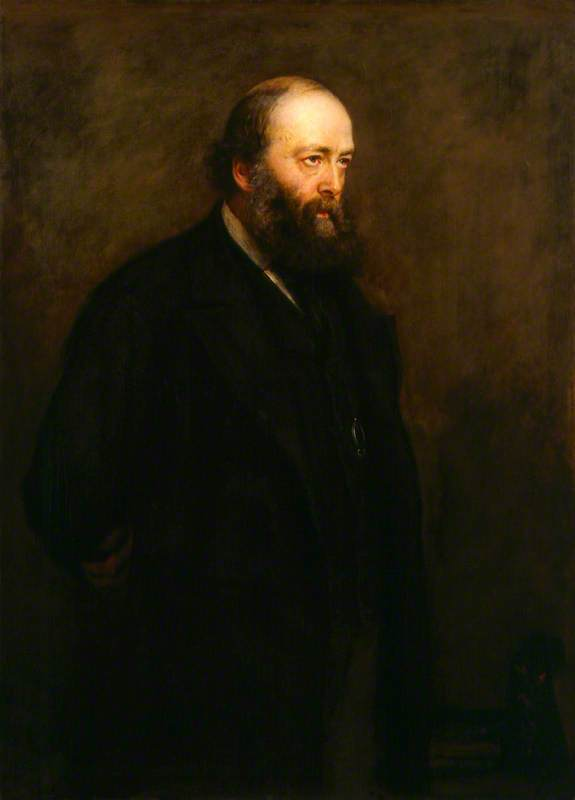
- Portrait of the Marquess of Salisbury by John Everett Millais (1883)
- Date formed: 23 June 1885
- Date dissolved: 28 January 1886

People and organisations
- Monarch: Victoria
- Prime Minister: Robert Gascoyne-Cecil, 3rd Marquess of Salisbury
- Total no. of members: 70 appointments
- Member party: Conservative Party
- Status in legislature: Minority dependent on IPP support
- Opposition party: Liberal Party
- Opposition leaders: William Ewart Gladstone in the House of Commons; Lord Granville in the House of Lords

History
- Outgoing election: 1885 general election
- Legislature terms: 22nd UK Parliament; 23rd UK Parliament lost a vote of confidence
- Predecessor: Second Gladstone ministry
- Successor: Third Gladstone ministry

Robert Gascoyne-Cecil, 3rd Marquess of Salisbury formed a government in June 1885, upon his appointment as Prime Minister of the United Kingdom by Queen Victoria, succeeding William Ewart Gladstone. His ministry lasted for over seven months.

== Cabinet ==
Cabinet members
Portfolio	Minister	Took office	Left office
Secretary of State for Foreign Affairs; Leader of the House of Lords	Robert Gascoyne-Cecil, 3rd Marquess of Salisbury (head of ministry)	23 June 1885	6 February 1886
First Lord of the Treasury	Stafford Northcote, 1st Earl of Iddesleigh	29 June 1885	1 February 1886
Lord Chancellor	Hardinge Giffard, 1st Baron Halsbury	24 June 1885	28 January 1886
Lord President of the Council	Gathorne Gathorne-Hardy, 1st Viscount Cranbrook	24 June 1885	6 February 1886
Lord Privy Seal	Dudley Ryder, 3rd Earl of Harrowby	24 June 1885	28 January 1886
Secretary of State for the Home Department	Sir Richard Cross	24 June 1885	1 February 1886
Secretary of State for the Colonies	Frederick Stanley	24 June 1885	28 January 1886
Secretary of State for War	William Henry Smith	24 June 1885	21 January 1886
Secretary of State for War	Gathorne Gathorne-Hardy, 1st Viscount Cranbrook	21 January 1886	6 February 1886
Secretary of State for India	Lord Randolph Churchill	24 June 1885	28 January 1886
First Lord of the Admiralty	Lord George Hamilton	1885	1886
Chancellor of the Exchequer; Leader of the House of Commons	Sir Michael Hicks Beach, 9th Baronet	24 June 1885	28 January 1886
President of the Board of Trade	Charles Gordon-Lennox, 6th Duke of Richmond	24 June 1885	19 August 1885
President of the Board of Trade	Edward Stanhope	19 August 1885	28 January 1886
Chief Secretary for Ireland	William Henry Smith	23 January 1886	28 January 1886
Postmaster General	Lord John Manners	1885	1886
Lord Lieutenant of Ireland	Henry Herbert, 4th Earl of Carnarvon	27 June 1885	28 January 1886
Lord Chancellor of Ireland	Edward Gibson, 1st Baron Ashbourne	1885	February 1886
Secretary for Scotland	Charles Gordon-Lennox, 6th Duke of Richmond	17 August 1885	28 January 1886
Vice-President of the Council	Edward Stanhope	24 June 1885	17 September 1885

=== Changes ===
- August 1885 – The Duke of Richmond becomes Secretary for Scotland. Edward Stanhope succeeds him at the Board of Trade; his successor as Vice-President of the Council is not in the Cabinet.
- January 1886 –
  - The Lord-Lieutenantship of Ireland goes into commission.
  - William Henry Smith becomes Chief Secretary for Ireland. Lord Cranbrook succeeds him as Secretary for War while remaining Lord President.

== List of ministers ==
Office	Name	Date
Prime minister (Note: The position of Prime Minister was not a formal ministerial office.); Leader of the House of Lords	Robert Gascoyne-Cecil, 3rd Marquess of Salisbury	23 Jun 1885 – 28 Jan 1886
First Lord of the Treasury	Stafford Northcote, 1st Earl of Iddesleigh	24 Jun 1885
Chancellor of the Exchequer; Leader of the House of Commons	Sir Michael Hicks Beach, 9th Baronet	24 Jun 1885
Parliamentary Secretary to the Treasury	Aretas Akers-Douglas	24 Jun 1885
Financial Secretary to the Treasury	Sir Henry Holland	24 Jun 1885
Financial Secretary to the Treasury	Sir Matthew White Ridley	1885
Financial Secretary to the Treasury	William Jackson	1886
Junior Lords of the Treasury	Charles Dalrymple	29 Jun 1885 – 28 Jan 1886
Junior Lords of the Treasury	Sidney Herbert	29 Jun 1885 – 28 Jan 1886
Junior Lords of the Treasury	William Walrond	29 Jun 1885 – 28 Jan 1886
Lord Chancellor	Hardinge Giffard, 1st Baron Halsbury	24 Jun 1885
Lord President of the Council	Gathorne Gathorne-Hardy, 1st Viscount Cranbrook	24 Jun 1885
Lord Privy Seal	Dudley Ryder, 3rd Earl of Harrowby	24 Jun 1885
Secretary of State for the Home Department	Sir R. A. Cross	24 Jun 1885
Under-Secretary of State for the Home Department	Charles Stuart-Wortley	30 Jun 1885
Secretary of State for Foreign Affairs	Robert Gascoyne-Cecil, 3rd Marquess of Salisbury	24 Jun 1885
Under-Secretary of State for Foreign Affairs	Robert Bourke	25 Jun 1885
Secretary of State for War	William Henry Smith	24 Jun 1885
Under-Secretary of State for War	William Keppel, Viscount Bury	26 Jun 1885
Financial Secretary to the War Office	Henry Northcote	26 Jun 1885
Surveyor-General of the Ordnance	Guy Dawnay	27 Jun 1885
Secretary of State for the Colonies	Frederick Stanley	24 Jun 1885
Under-Secretary of State for the Colonies	Windham Wyndham-Quin, 4th Earl of Dunraven and Mount-Earl	24 Jun 1885
Secretary of State for India	Lord Randolph Churchill	24 Jun 1885
Under-Secretary of State for India	George Harris, 4th Baron Harris	25 Jun 1885
First Lord of the Admiralty	Lord George Hamilton	24 Jun 1885
Parliamentary Secretary to the Admiralty	Charles Ritchie	1 Jul 1885
Civil Lord of the Admiralty	Ellis Ashmead-Bartlett	1 Jul 1885
Vice-President of the Committee on Education	Edward Stanhope	24 Jun 1885
Vice-President of the Committee on Education	Sir Henry Holland	17 Sep 1885
Chief Secretary for Ireland	Sir William Hart Dyke, 7th Baronet	25 Jun 1885
Chief Secretary for Ireland	William Henry Smith	23 Jan 1886
Lord Lieutenant of Ireland	Henry Herbert, 4th Earl of Carnarvon	27 Jun 1885
Lord Chancellor of Ireland	Edward Gibson, 1st Baron Ashbourne	27 Jun 1885
Postmaster General	Lord John Manners	24 Jun 1885
Secretary for Scotland	Charles Gordon-Lennox, 6th Duke of Richmond	17 Aug 1885
President of the Board of Trade	Charles Gordon-Lennox, 6th Duke of Richmond	24 Jun 1885
President of the Board of Trade	Edward Stanhope	19 Aug 1885
Parliamentary Secretary to the Board of Trade	Baron Henry de Worms	24 Jun 1885
Chancellor of the Duchy of Lancaster	Henry Chaplin	24 Jun 1885
President of the Local Government Board	Arthur Balfour	24 Jun 1885
Parliamentary Secretary to the Local Government Board	Adelbert Brownlow-Cust, 3rd Earl Brownlow	24 Jun 1885
Paymaster General	Frederick Lygon, 6th Earl Beauchamp	24 Jun 1885
First Commissioner of Works	David Robert Plunket	24 Jun 1885
Attorney General	Sir Richard Webster	27 Jul 1885
Solicitor General	John Eldon Gorst	2 Jul 1885
Judge Advocate General	William Thackeray Marriott	13 Jul 1885
Lord Advocate	John Macdonald	2 Jul 1885
Solicitor General for Scotland	James Robertson	2 Jul 1885
Attorney-General for Ireland	Hugh Holmes	3 Jul 1885
Solicitor-General for Ireland	John Munroe	3 Jul 1885
Solicitor-General for Ireland	John George Gibson	1885
Lord Steward of the Household	William Edgcumbe, 4th Earl of Mount Edgcumbe	27 Jun 1885
Lord Chamberlain of the Household	Edward Bootle-Wilbraham, 1st Earl of Lathom	27 Jun 1885
Vice-Chamberlain of the Household	William Legge, Viscount Lewisham	27 Jun 1885
Master of the Horse	Orlando Bridgeman, 3rd Earl of Bradford	1 Jul 1885
Treasurer of the Household	William Pleydell-Bouverie, Viscount Folkestone	27 Jun 1885
Comptroller of the Household	Lord Arthur Hill	27 Jun 1885
Captain of the Gentlemen-at-Arms	George Coventry, 9th Earl of Coventry	6 Jul 1885
Captain of the Yeomen of the Guard	George Barrington, 7th Viscount Barrington	27 Jun 1885
Master of the Buckhounds	John Beresford, 5th Marquess of Waterford	27 Jun 1885
Mistress of the Robes	Louisa Montagu Douglas Scott, Duchess of Buccleuch	27 Jun 1885
Lords in Waiting	Dudley FitzGerald-de Ros, 23rd Baron de Ros	27 Jun 1885 – 28 Jan 1886
Lords in Waiting	Algernon Keith-Falconer, 9th Earl of Kintore	27 Jun 1885 – 28 Jan 1886
Lords in Waiting	Cornwallis Maude, 4th Viscount Hawarden	27 Jun 1885 – 28 Jan 1886
Lords in Waiting	John Henniker-Major, 5th Baron Henniker	27 Jun 1885 – 28 Jan 1886
Lords in Waiting	John Hope, 7th Earl of Hopetoun	27 Jun 1885 – 28 Jan 1886
Lords in Waiting	William Elphinstone, 15th Lord Elphinstone	27 Jun 1885 – 28 Jan 1886
Lords in Waiting	George Irby, 6th Baron Boston	6 Jul 1885 – 28 Jan 1886
Extra Lord in Waiting	Mortimer Sackville-West, 1st Baron Sackville	1 Oct 1876 – 1 Oct 1888

== Notes ==
Preceded by Second Gladstone ministry	Government of the United Kingdom; 1885–1886	Succeeded by Third Gladstone ministry
