= Bradford Corporation v Pickles =

Leading English tort law decision

- Court: House of Lords
- Full case name: The Mayor, Aldermen and Burgesses of the Borough of Bradford v Edward Pickles
- Decided: 29 July 1895
- Citation: [1895] AC 587
- Transcript: Full text of House of Lords decision

Case history
- Prior action: Court of Appeal

Court membership
- Judges sitting: Lord Halsbury, LC; Lord Watson; Lord Ashbourne; Lord Macnaghten

Case opinions
- Lord Halsbury, LC; Lord Watson; Lord Ashbourne; Lord Macnaghten

Bradford Corporation v Pickles [1895] AC 587 is a leading English tort law case on the role of malice in determining liability. It established that a lawful act does not become unlawful purely because it is done so with malicious intent. Specifically, one may exercise their statutory property rights however they see fit, even if done so with malicious intent.

The claimants, the Corporation of Bradford, alleged that Pickles had deliberately interfered with the groundwater supply on his land that fed into the local authority's waterworks, seeking to force the claimants to purchase his land. On appeal, the House of Lords dismissed the case and awarded costs to Pickles.

== Facts ==
The respondent, Edward Pickles, was the owner of an area of land bordering and percolating groundwater to Many Wells, a spring west of Bradford, Yorkshire. Water from the spring supplied the town's waterworks, and had done so for some 40 years. Pickles decided in the 1890s to install shafts and drain the water from the strata under his land, thus depriving the town of its water source. The Corporation alleged that, in doing so, Pickles sought to force it to buy the land at an above-market price.

The Corporation's defence relied primarily on the local act that governed the waterworks and its access to water, specifically section 49:

It shall not be lawful for any Person other than the [Bradford Waterworks] Company to divert, alter, or appropriate in any other Manner than by Law they may be legally entitled any of the Waters supplying or flowing from certain Streams and Springs called "Many Wells" … whereby the Waters of the said Springs may be drawn off or diminished in Quantity

— Bradford Waterworks Act 1854, s. 49.

The Corporation also argued that, in attempting to force the purchase of his land, Pickles was acting "maliciously".

== Judgement ==
On being appealed to the House of Lords, the case came before Lords Halsbury, LC, Watson, Ashbourne, and Macnaghten. They unanimously ruled that the appeal should be dismissed, with costs. It was agreed that the motive of an act does not determine its legality, even if malicious. It was further agreed that doing so with intention to force purchase of the land was similarly acceptable.
