= Sir Samuel Walker, 1st Baronet =

Irish politician, lawyer and judge (1832–1911)

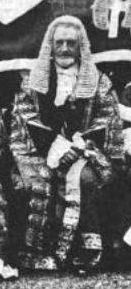
- In The Sketch, 4 November 1896
- Born: 19 June 1832; Gore Port, Finea, Ireland
- Died: 13 August 1911 (aged 79); Dublin, Ireland
- Burial place: Mount Jerome Cemetery
- Education: Trinity College Dublin
- Occupations: Politician, lawyer, judge
- Political party: Liberal
- Spouses: Cecilia Charlotte Greene (m. 1855; died 1880) Eleanor McLaughlin (m. 1881)
- Children: 8

Sir Samuel Walker, 1st Baronet, PC (Ire), KC (19 June 1832 – 13 August 1911) was an Irish Liberal politician, lawyer and judge. He was the first of the Walker baronets of Pembroke House.

== Career ==
He was born at Gore Port, Finea, County Westmeath, a younger son of Captain Alexander Walker and his wife Elizabeth Elliott, and younger brother of Mark Walker VC. He was educated at Portarlington School and Trinity College Dublin. He entered Gray's Inn before being called to the bar in 1855.

Walker quickly became one of the leaders of the Irish Chancery bar; in 1872 he was made a Queen's Counsel, and eleven years later he became Ireland's Solicitor General. The following year, he was elected Liberal Member of Parliament for Londonderry, a seat he held for little more than a year before the constituency was divided. In 1885 he was for a period the island's Attorney-General. His celebrated remark that on entering the House of Commons "he was amazed to hear Members making factual statements without sworn affidavits to support them" was probably a joke. He himself rarely spoke in the House, but his speeches were enlivened by a dry wit.

An advocate for Home Rule, Walker remained within the Liberal Party after its split, and was eventually appointed Lord Chancellor of Ireland when Gladstone returned to power in 1892. When Lord Rosebery's ministry fell three years later, he was made a Lord Justice of Appeal, and remained in this capacity until his reappointment as Lord Chancellor by the Liberal government in 1905. He lived at Pembroke Hall, Upper Mount Street in Dublin. He was created a baronet the following year, and died rather suddenly, while still in office, at his house on 13 August 1911. He is buried in Mount Jerome Cemetery, beside his first wife Cecilia and his daughter Alice.

== Character and reputation ==
He was a lawyer of great ability, and went on to become one of a group of Irish judges, which included Christopher Palles (served 1874–1916), Gerald FitzGibbon (served 1878–1909), and Hugh Holmes (served 1897–1913), who gave the Irish Court of Appeal, in the years 1890–1910, a reputation for judicial eminence.

Maurice Healy praised him as "a loyal friend and a man of courage" but thought that these qualities sometimes led him into acts of political recklessness. His insistence on appointing Matthias Bodkin, a leading journalist and a staunch political ally, to a County Court judgeship, was a serious political blunder. Although Bodkin was a qualified barrister, legitimate doubts had been raised by Walker's political opponents as to whether he had the necessary years of practice to qualify for appointment to the Bench. The result was an action for quo warranto challenging the validity of Bodkin's appointment. This embarrassed the government, although no harm ultimately came of it: the case was resolved amicably and Bodkin, by general agreement, proved to be an excellent judge.

== Family ==
In 1855 he married Cecilia Charlotte Greene, daughter of Arthur Greene and Frances Shaw, and a niece of the judge Richard Wilson Greene. The couple had six children, including Alexander, the second baronet, and Alice, who died in 1949. Cecilia died in 1880.

In 1881 he married Eleanor McLaughlin, with whom he had two more children, including Cecil, who succeeded his half-brother Alexander as third baronet.

== Arms ==
Coat of arms of Sir Samuel Walker, 1st Baronet

Notes
Granted by Sir Arthur Vicars, Ulster King of Arms, 13 July 1906.
Crest
On a wreath of the colours on a Roman fasces fesswise Or banded Azure a dove of the second holding in its bill a trefoil slipped of the first.
Escutcheon
Ermine on a chevron engrailed plain cotised Azure between three hurts each charged with a portcullis Or as many trefoils slipped of the last.
Motto
Premo Ad Honorem

Parliament of the United Kingdom
| Preceded by Sir Thomas McClure, 1st Bt; Andrew Marshall Porter | Member of Parliament for Londonderry; 1884 – 1885; With: Sir Thomas McClure, 1st Bt | Constituency abolished |
Legal offices
| Preceded by John Naish | Solicitor-General for Ireland; 1883 – 1885 | Succeeded by The MacDermot |
| Preceded by John Naish | Attorney-General for Ireland; 1885 | Succeeded by Hugh Holmes |
| Preceded by Hugh Holmes | Attorney-General for Ireland; 1886 | Succeeded by Hugh Holmes |
Political offices
| Preceded by The Lord Ashbourne | Lord Chancellor of Ireland; 1892 – 1895 | Succeeded by The Lord Ashbourne |
| Preceded by The Lord Ashbourne | Lord Chancellor of Ireland; 1905 – 1911 | Succeeded by Redmond Barry |
Baronetage of the United Kingdom
| New creation | Baronet (of Pembroke House); 1906–1911 | Succeeded by Alexander Arthur Walker |
