= Court of Appeal in Ireland =

Final appellate court within Ireland, 1877 to 1924

- Established: 1877
- Dissolved: 1924
- Jurisdiction: Ireland, within the United Kingdom of Great Britain and Ireland
- Location: Four Courts, Dublin
- Authorised by: Supreme Court of Judicature Act (Ireland) 1877
- Appeals to: House of Lords

Lord Chancellor of Ireland

Lord Chief Justice of Ireland

The Court of Appeal in Ireland was created by the Parliament of the United Kingdom of Great Britain and Ireland under the Supreme Court of Judicature Act (Ireland) 1877 as the final appellate court within Ireland, then under British rule. A last appeal from this court could be taken to the House of Lords in London.

== Personnel ==
The Lord Chancellor of Ireland was President of the Court of Appeal. As in England, the full-time judges had the title Lord Justice of Appeal. Other senior judges such as the Chief Baron of the Irish Exchequer, sat as additional judges of appeal when required.

The following judges held the title of Lord Justice of the Court of Appeal in Ireland from the court's creation in 1878 to the abolition of the pre-independence courts in 1924.

Year appointed	Name	Year left office	Reason for leaving office
1878 (Note: Previously served as Lord Justice of Appeal in Chancery in Ireland)	Jonathan Christian	1878	Retirement
1878	Rickard Deasy	1883	Death
1878	Gerald FitzGibbon	1909	Death
1883	Charles Robert Barry	1897	Death
1885	John Naish	1886	Re-appointment as Lord Chancellor of Ireland
1886	John Naish (again)	1890	Death
1895	Samuel Walker	1905	Re-appointment as Lord Chancellor of Ireland
1897	Hugh Holmes	1913	Retirement
1909	Richard Cherry	1914	Appointment as Lord Chief Justice of Ireland
1913	John Moriarty	1915	Death
1915	Stephen Ronan	1924	Retirement
1915	Thomas Molony	1918	Appointment as Lord Chief Justice of Ireland
1918	James O'Connor	1924	Retirement

== High Court of Appeal for Ireland ==
The partition of Ireland by the Government of Ireland Act 1920 created separate jurisdictions of Northern Ireland and Southern Ireland; the Supreme Court of Judicature of Ireland was abolished and replaced by parallel Supreme Courts of Northern and Southern Ireland, each comprising a High Court and Court of Appeal. A new High Court of Appeal for Ireland was created to hear appeals from both the Court of Appeal in Southern Ireland and the Court of Appeal in Northern Ireland. Further appeal lay from the new court to the Law Lords in Westminster. The four judges (other than the Lord Chancellor) of the abolished Court of Appeal chose to join the new Southern court rather than the Northern one.

The Lord Chancellor of Ireland (John Ross), Lord Chief Justice of Southern Ireland (Thomas Molony), and Lord Chief Justice of Northern Ireland (Denis Henry) were ex officio members of the new High Court of Appeal. By default, an appeal was heard by the Lord Chancellor and one judge from each jurisdiction; in the absence of the Lord Chancellor, it could be heard by two judges from each jurisdiction; for important cases, the Lord Chancellor could mandate a five-judge court, himself and two from each jurisdiction. Each Lord Chief Justice could nominate one member of his Supreme Court to hear an appeal instead of or in addition to himself.

The High Court of Appeal was constituted on 1 October 1921 and abolished on 6 December 1922 by the Irish Free State (Consequential Provisions) Act 1922, passed in consequence of the replacement of Southern Ireland by the Irish Free State. Among the judges who sat in the court were James Andrews from Northern Ireland and Stephen Ronan from Southern Ireland. In its brief lifespan at least ten of its judgments were reported. The most significant, Leyburn v. Armagh Co. Co., was that, since it was a new court with wider powers than the 1877 Court of Appeal, the 1921 High Court of Appeal was not bound by the former's precedents (stare decisis). Three of the High Court of Appeal's judgments, relating to cases from Southern Ireland, were appealed to the House of Lords and overturned there. Two of the Lords' rulings were after the creation of the Irish Free State.

== After abolition ==
=== Northern Ireland ===
After the abolition of the High Court of Appeal for Ireland, appeals from the Court of Appeal in Northern Ireland were directly to the House of Lords. In 1930 a separate Court of Criminal Appeal in Northern Ireland was established. The Judicature (Northern Ireland) Act 1978 reconstituted the courts of Northern Ireland, with the new Court of Appeal replacing the old Court of Appeal and the Court of Criminal Appeal.

=== Irish Free State ===
The Court of Appeal in Southern Ireland continued in the Irish Free State as a transitional measure, until the courts specified by the Free State Constitution were brought into being by the Courts of Justice Act 1924. Hugh Kennedy, the Attorney-General, objected to Thomas Molony's continued use of "Southern Ireland" in the court's documents. In March 1923 a statutory order was made changing "in Southern Ireland" to "Saorstát Éireann". (Note: Saorstát Éireann was the Irish-language name of the Irish Free State.) The Constitution specified that final appeal from the Free State courts was to the Judicial Committee of the Privy Council rather than the Lords.

The 1924 act transferred criminal appeals to the new Court of Criminal Appeal and most other functions of the old Court of Appeal to the new Supreme Court of Justice, which also heard appeals from the Court of Criminal Appeal. The Supreme Court's judgments became final when Privy Council appeals were abolished by the Constitution (Amendment No. 22) Act 1933.

Charles O'Connor was the only one of the four members of the abolished Court of Appeal retained on the new Supreme Court. The other three—Thomas Molony, Stephen Ronan, and James O'Connor—were obliged to retire; their historical unionist sympathies meant neither they nor the Free State government desired that they should continue. This cancellation of the life tenure under which the judges had been appointed was authorised by the Irish Free State (Consequential Provisions) Act 1922, as compensation for which they received higher than usual pensions, which were paid from the British Exchequer rather than the Irish.

== Reputation ==
During the first three decades of its existence, the reputation of the Court of Appeal was very high, probably higher than that of any other tribunal in Irish legal history. Maurice Healy, writing in 1939, thought that the Court as it was constituted in the early 1900s "could compare with any college of justice in history". V.T.H. Delaney, writing in 1960, believed that all Irish barristers would choose the old Court of Appeal as representing the Irish judiciary at their best. This reputation depended largely on the quality of the individual judges; Christopher Palles is still often called "the greatest of Irish judges", and Gerald FitzGibbon, Hugh Holmes and Lord Ashbourne were his intellectual equals. Unfortunately, when these men were gone, there was a problem in finding replacements of equal calibre, and from about 1916, after the death of Fitzgibbon (in 1909), and the retirement of Holmes (in 1913) and Palles (in 1916), the reputation of the Court declined. In its last years, according to Healy, the judges were notable only for their constant quarrelling among themselves.
