= Third Gladstone ministry =

Government of the United Kingdom

- February–July 1886
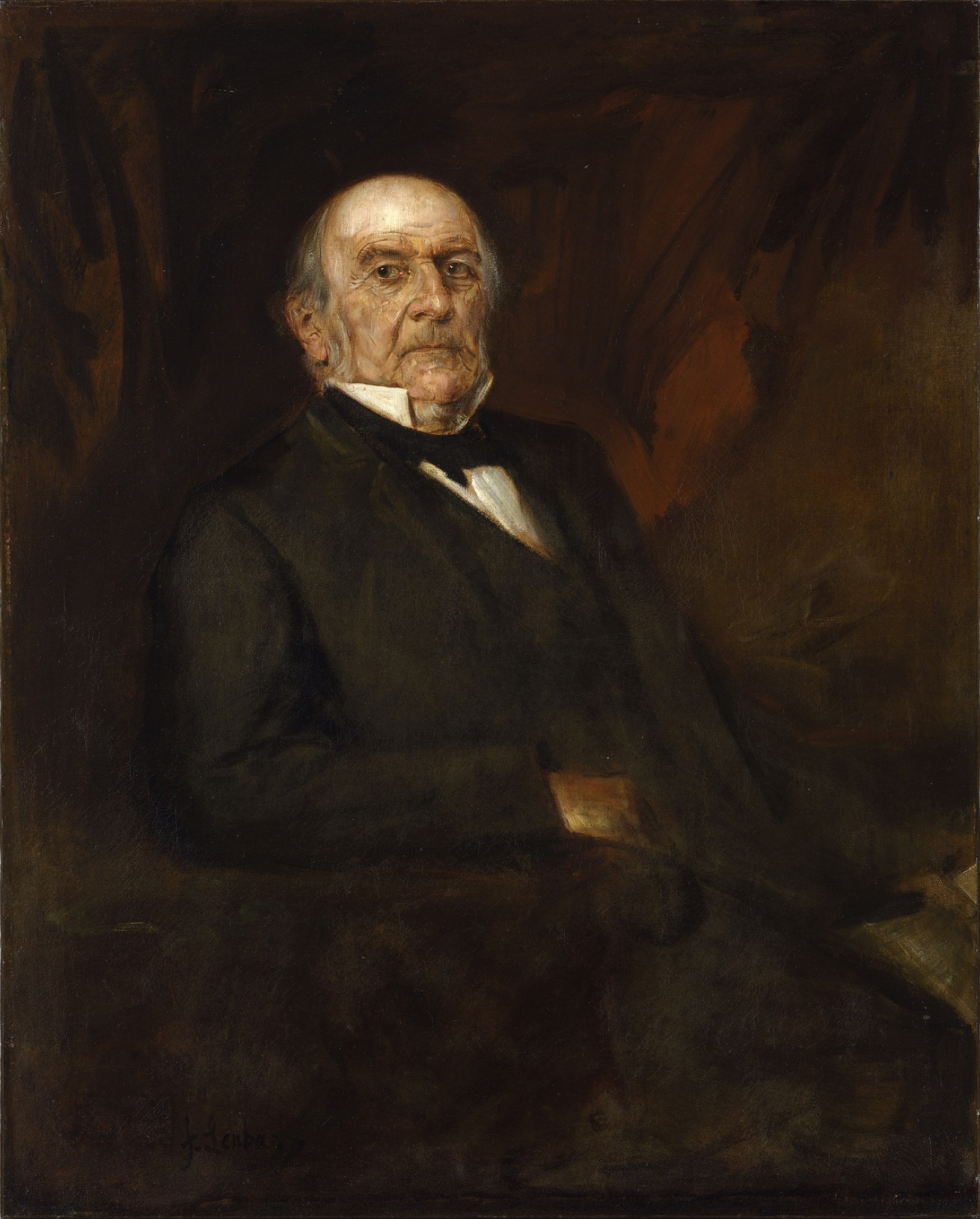
- Gladstone (1886)
- Date formed: 1 February 1886
- Date dissolved: 20 July 1886

People and organisations
- Monarch: Victoria
- Prime Minister: William Ewart Gladstone
- Total no. of members: 68 appointments
- Member party: Liberal Party
- Status in legislature: Minority
- Opposition party: Conservative Party
- Opposition leaders: Sir Michael Hicks Beach in the House of Commons; Lord Salisbury in the House of Lords

History
- Election: 1885 general election
- Outgoing election: 1886 general election
- Legislature terms: 23rd UK Parliament lost a vote of confidence
- Predecessor: First Salisbury ministry
- Successor: Second Salisbury ministry

The third Gladstone ministry was one of the shortest-lived ministries in British history. It was led by William Ewart Gladstone of the Liberal Party upon his reappointment as Prime Minister of the United Kingdom by Queen Victoria. It lasted five months until July 1886.

== Formation ==
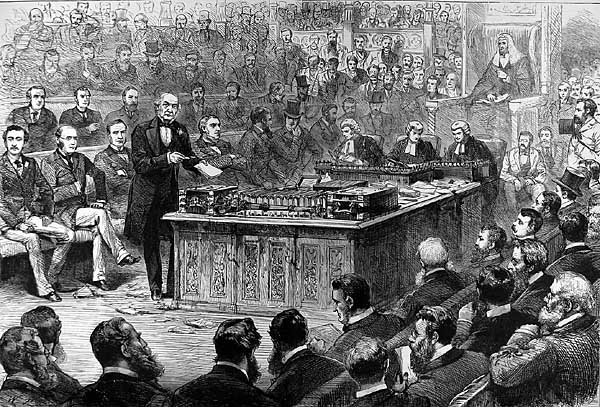
Gladstone speaking during a Commons debate on Irish Home Rule on 8 April 1886.

The Liberal Party under the leadership of William Gladstone came to power in the United Kingdom in February 1886 after they, with the support of the Irish Nationalists, defeated the Conservative government of Lord Salisbury. The ministry was to become one of the most short-lived in British history. Gladstone, aged 76, became Prime Minister of the United Kingdom for the third time. Sir William Vernon Harcourt became Chancellor of the Exchequer, Hugh Childers Home Secretary and future prime minister the Earl of Rosebery Foreign Secretary. Lord Selborne and Sir Henry James both rejected the Lord Chancellorship, a post, which, however, was accepted by Sir Farrer Herschell, who was ennobled as Baron Herschell. Former Foreign Secretary Lord Granville became Secretary of State for the Colonies, while another political veteran, Lord Kimberley, resumed the post of Secretary of State for India which he had held from 1882 to 1885. The influential Joseph Chamberlain was appointed President of the Local Government Board while future party leader and Prime Minister Henry Campbell-Bannerman was made Secretary of State for War. The government also saw John Morley hold his first ministerial post as Chief Secretary for Ireland.

The ministry is chiefly remembered for Gladstone's first attempt to introduce the Home Rule Bill for Ireland. The bill was defeated by a majority of 30 (93 Liberal MP's having voted against it) on 8 June and on 26 June Parliament was dissolved. The issue split the Liberal Party. Lord Hartington, who had refused to serve under Gladstone because of his Irish policies, became leader of the Liberal Unionists. He was joined by Joseph Chamberlain, who had resigned over Home Rule in April.

== Fate ==
The Conservative Party, with the support of the Liberal Unionists, gained a decisive victory in the July 1886 general election, and Lord Salisbury once again became prime minister. The Liberals were to remain out of office until 1892, when Gladstone became prime minister for a fourth time.

== Cabinet ==
=== February 1886 to August 1886 ===
Cabinet
| Portfolio | Minister | Took office | Left office |
|---|---|---|---|
| First Lord of the Treasury; Lord Privy Seal; Leader of the House of Commons | William Ewart Gladstone (head of ministry) | 1 February 1886 | 20 July 1886 |
| Lord Chancellor | Farrer Herschell, 1st Baron Herschell | 6 February 1886 | 3 August 1886 |
| Lord President of the Council | John Spencer, 5th Earl Spencer | 6 February 1886 | 3 August 1886 |
| Secretary of State for the Home Department | Hugh Childers | 6 February 1886 | 3 August 1886 |
| Secretary of State for Foreign Affairs | Archibald Primrose, 5th Earl of Rosebery | 6 February 1886 | 3 August 1886 |
| Secretary of State for the Colonies; Leader of the House of Lords | Granville Leveson-Gower, 2nd Earl Granville | 6 February 1886 | 3 August 1886 |
| Secretary of State for War | Henry Campbell-Bannerman | 6 February 1886 | 3 August 1886 |
| Secretary of State for India | John Wodehouse, 1st Earl of Kimberley | 6 February 1886 | 3 August 1886 |
| Chancellor of the Exchequer | Sir William Harcourt | 6 February 1886 | 3 August 1886 |
| First Lord of the Admiralty | George Robinson, 1st Marquess of Ripon | 6 February 1886 | 3 August 1886 |
| President of the Board of Trade | A. J. Mundella | 6 February 1886 | 3 August 1886 |
| President of the Local Government Board | Joseph Chamberlain | 6 February 1886 | 3 April 1886 |
| President of the Local Government Board | James Stansfeld | 3 April 1886 | 3 August 1886 |
| Chief Secretary for Ireland | John Morley | 6 February 1886 | 3 August 1886 |
| Secretary for Scotland | Sir George Trevelyan, 2nd Baronet | 6 February 1886 | 3 April 1886 |

==== Changes ====
April 1886: James Stansfeld succeeds Joseph Chamberlain at the Local Government Board. George Otto Trevelyan leaves the Cabinet. His successor as Secretary for Scotland is not in the Cabinet.

== List of ministers ==
Cabinet members are listed in bold face.

| Office | Name | Date |
|---|---|---|
| Prime Minister (Note: The position of Prime Minister was not a formal ministerial office..) | **William Ewart Gladstone** | 1 February 1886 – 20 July 1886 |
| First Lord of the Treasury | **William Ewart Gladstone** | 1 February 1886 – 20 July 1886 |
| Leader of the House of Commons | **William Ewart Gladstone** | 1 February 1886 – 20 July 1886 |
| Chancellor of the Exchequer | **Sir William Vernon Harcourt** | 6 February 1886 |
| Parliamentary Secretary to the Treasury | Arnold Morley | 6 February 1886 |
| Financial Secretary to the Treasury | Henry Fowler | 6 February 1886 |
| Junior Lords of the Treasury | Sir Edward James Reed | 13 February 1886 – 20 July 1886 |
| Junior Lords of the Treasury | Cyril Flower | 13 February 1886 – 20 July 1886 |
| Junior Lords of the Treasury | George Leveson-Gower | 13 February 1886 – 20 July 1886 |
| Lord Chancellor | **Sir Farrer Herschell** (Note: Created Lord Herschell on 8 February 1886.) | 6 February 1886 |
| Lord President of the Council | **John Spencer, 5th Earl Spencer** | 6 February 1886 |
| Lord Privy Seal | **William Ewart Gladstone** | 17 February 1886 |
| Secretary of State for the Home Department | **Hugh Childers** | 6 February 1886 |
| Under-Secretary of State for the Home Department | Henry Broadhurst | 6 February 1886 |
| Secretary of State for Foreign Affairs | **Archibald Primrose, 5th Earl of Rosebery** | 6 February 1886 |
| Parliamentary Under-Secretary of State for Foreign Affairs | James Bryce | 7 February 1886 |
| Secretary of State for War | **Henry Campbell-Bannerman** | 6 February 1886 |
| Under-Secretary of State for War | William Mansfield, 1st Viscount Sandhurst | 6 February 1886 |
| Financial Secretary to the War Office | Herbert Gladstone | 6 February 1886 |
| Surveyor-General of the Ordnance | William Woodall | 6 February 1886 |
| Secretary of State for the Colonies and Leader of the House of Lords | **Granville Leveson-Gower, 2nd Earl Granville** | 6 February 1886 |
| Under-Secretary of State for the Colonies | George Osborne Morgan | 6 February 1886 |
| Secretary of State for India | **John Wodehouse, 1st Earl of Kimberley** | 6 February 1886 |
| Under-Secretary of State for India | Sir Ughtred Kay-Shuttleworth | 7 February 1886 |
| Under-Secretary of State for India | Stafford Howard | 12 April 1886 |
| First Lord of the Admiralty | **George Robinson, 1st Marquess of Ripon** | 9 February 1886 |
| Parliamentary and Financial Secretary to the Admiralty | John Tomlinson Hibbert | 9 February 1886 |
| Civil Lord of the Admiralty | Robert Duff | 15 February 1886 |
| Chief Secretary for Ireland | **John Morley** | 6 February 1886 |
| Lord Lieutenant of Ireland | John Hamilton-Gordon, 1st Marquess of Aberdeen and Temair | 8 February 1886 |
| President of the Local Government Board | **Joseph Chamberlain** | 6 February 1886 |
| President of the Local Government Board | **James Stansfeld** | 3 April 1886 |
| Parliamentary Secretary to the Local Government Board | Jesse Collings | 6 February 1886 |
| Parliamentary Secretary to the Local Government Board | William Copeland Borlase | 3 April 1886 |
| Secretary for Scotland | **George Trevelyan** | 8 February 1886 |
| Secretary for Scotland | John Ramsay, 13th Earl of Dalhousie | 5 April 1886 |
| President of the Board of Trade | **A. J. Mundella** | 17 February 1886 |
| Parliamentary Secretary to the Board of Trade | Charles Dyke Acland | 6 February 1886 |
| Vice-President of the Committee on Education | Sir Lyon Playfair | 13 February 1886 |
| Chancellor of the Duchy of Lancaster | Edward Heneage | 6 February 1886 |
| Chancellor of the Duchy of Lancaster | Sir Ughtred Kay-Shuttleworth | 16 April 1886 |
| Paymaster General | Thomas Hovell-Thurlow-Cumming-Bruce, 5th Baron Thurlow | 3 April 1886 |
| Postmaster-General | George Glyn, 2nd Baron Wolverton | 17 February 1886 |
| First Commissioner of Works | Albert Parker, 3rd Earl of Morley | 17 February 1886 |
| First Commissioner of Works | Victor Bruce, 9th Earl of Elgin | 16 April 1886 |
| Attorney General | Sir Charles Russell | 9 February 1886 |
| Solicitor General | Sir Horace Davey | 16 February 1886 |
| Judge Advocate General | John William Mellor | 22 February 1886 |
| Lord Advocate | John Balfour | 13 February 1886 |
| Solicitor General for Scotland | Alexander Asher | 13 February 1886 |
| Attorney General for Ireland | Samuel Walker | February 1886 |
| Solicitor General for Ireland | Hugh Hyacinth O'Rorke MacDermot | February 1886 |
| Lord Steward of the Household | John Townshend, 1st Earl Sydney | 10 February 1886 |
| Lord Chamberlain of the Household | Valentine Browne, 4th Earl of Kenmare | 10 February 1886 |
| Vice-Chamberlain of the Household | Frederick Lambert, Viscount Kilcoursie | 19 February 1886 |
| Master of the Horse | Richard Boyle, 9th Earl of Cork | 10 February 1886 |
| Treasurer of the Household | Victor Bruce, 9th Earl of Elgin | 17 February 1886 |
| Comptroller of the Household | Edward Marjoribanks | 10 February 1886 |
| Captain of the Gentlemen-at-Arms | Charles Hanbury-Tracy, 4th Baron Sudeley | 10 February 1886 |
| Captain of the Yeomen of the Guard | William Monson, 7th Baron Monson | 10 February 1886 |
| Master of the Buckhounds | Charles Harbord, 5th Baron Suffield | 17 February 1886 |
| Mistress of the Robes | vacant | — |
| Lords in Waiting | Frederick Methuen, 2nd Baron Methuen | 16 February 1886 – 20 July 1886 |
| Lords in Waiting | Thomas Hovell-Thurlow-Cumming-Bruce, 5th Baron Thurlow | 16 February 1886 – 20 July 1886 |
| Lords in Waiting | Francis Stonor, 4th Baron Camoys | 16 February 1886 – 20 July 1886 |
| Lords in Waiting | Robert Offley Ashburton Milnes, 2nd Baron Houghton | 16 February 1886 – 20 July 1886 |
| Lords in Waiting | William Edwardes, 4th Baron Kensington | 1 March 1886 – 20 July 1886 |
| Lords in Waiting | Henry Tufton, 1st Baron Hothfield | 1 March 1886 – 20 July 1886 |
| Lords in Waiting | Thomas Lister, 4th Baron Ribblesdale | 1 March 1886 – 27 March 1886 |
| Extra Lord in Waiting | Mortimer Sackville-West, 1st Baron Sackville | 1 October 1876 – 1 October 1888 |

Notes

| Preceded by First Salisbury ministry | Government of the United Kingdom; 1886 | Succeeded by Second Salisbury ministry |
