= Stephen Ronan =

Irish lawyer and judge

Stephen Ronan, PC (13 April 1848 – 3 October 1925) was an Irish lawyer and judge. He was Irish Lord Justice of Appeal from 1915 to 1924.
