= Gerald FitzGibbon (judge, born 1837) =

Irish barrister and judge

The Right Honourable Gerald FitzGibbon
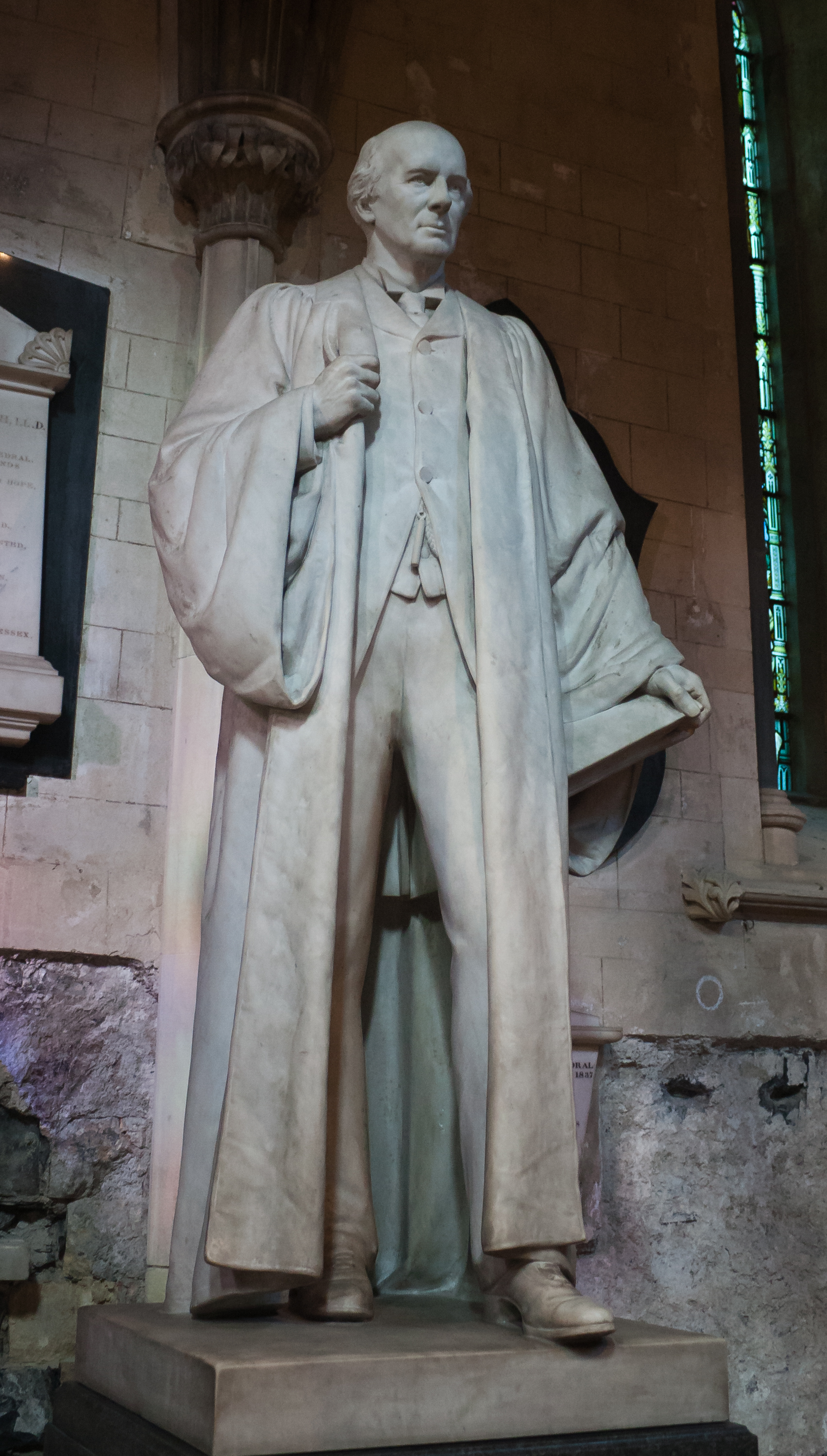
- FitzGibbon's statue in St. Patrick's Cathedral, Dublin.

Lord Justice of the Irish Court of Appeal
- In office 1878–1909
- Monarch: Victoria
- Preceded by: Rickard Deasy
- Succeeded by: Charles Robert Barry

Solicitor-General for Ireland
- In office 3 March 1877 – 1878
- Monarch: Victoria
- Preceded by: Hon. David Plunket
- Succeeded by: Hugh Holmes

Personal details
- Born: 1837
- Died: 14 October 1909 (aged 71–72)
- Spouse: Margaret Ann FitzGerald
- Children: 7, including Gerald
- Education: Trinity College Dublin

Gerald FitzGibbon PC (1837 – 14 October 1909) was an Irish barrister and judge, who is regarded as one of the outstanding Irish jurists of his time. He came from a family which produced three generations of eminent lawyers, with the father, son and grandson each bearing the name Gerald FitzGibbon.

== Background and early career ==
He was the elder of the two sons of Gerald FitzGibbon, QC, Master in Chancery (1793-1882), and his wife Ellen Patterson (died 1885), daughter of John Patterson of Belfast; his younger brother Henry (died 1912) was a distinguished doctor. The younger Gerald was educated at Trinity College Dublin, where he was elected a Scholar. He retained deep feelings of affection and loyalty towards Trinity College throughout his life, and gave evidence on its behalf before a Royal Commission in 1906.

He entered Lincoln's Inn in 1857. He was called to the Irish Bar in 1860 and to the English Bar the following year. He went on the Munster Circuit, where he quickly acquired a large practice. He was a fine lawyer and an eloquent public speaker. Maurice Healy recalled his "beautiful voice", which was sometimes compared to that of the great Russian singer Feodor Chaliapin: this, combined with a certain natural acting ability, made his arguments extraordinarily persuasive.

His courtroom victories included the libel action O'Keeffe v Cardinal Cullen, an unprecedented legal victory by a Catholic priest against Cardinal Paul Cullen (although the verdict was reversed on appeal).

Another triumph was in the disputed will case of Bagot v Bagot, where he appeared for Mrs. Alice Bagot (née Verner), daughter of Sir William Verner, 2nd Baronet and Mary Pakenham, and widow of Christopher Nevile Bagot, of Aughrane Castle, Justice of the Peace for County Galway. Her husband had denied paternity of her son, William, and disinherited him in favour of Christopher's brother John. Fitzgibbon's eloquence, in the teeth of formidable medical evidence on the paternity issue produced by John Bagot, who was the beneficiary under his brother's will, persuaded the jury that Christopher Bagot was under a temporary mental delusion when he wrote his will, and that the child was his.

Having initially declined to take silk in 1868, he became Queen's Counsel in 1872. He was a Bencher of the King's Inns, and his portrait hangs in the Dining Hall there.

In 1876 he became Law Adviser to the Lord Lieutenant of Ireland, and the following year he became Solicitor General for Ireland.

== Lord Justice of Appeal ==
In 1878 he was appointed to the Bench as Lord Justice of the Court of Appeal in Ireland, with the general approval of the legal profession, and also the Press, who praised both his political moderation and his legal ability. He served on that Court with immense distinction for more than thirty years.

=== Reputation ===
The old Court of Appeal has been described as probably the strongest judicial tribunal ever to exist in Ireland, due to the presence of such exceptional judges as Fitzgibbon himself, Hugh Holmes, Christopher Palles and Lord Ashbourne. While Palles is usually regarded as the greatest of the Irish judges of his time, some contemporaries thought that FitzGibbon was at least his equal: it is noteworthy that when the House of Lords heard appeals from decisions where FitzGibbon had dissented, they almost always preferred his view to that of his colleagues.

Maurice Healy believed that FitzGibbon as a judge fell short of true greatness due to a certain lack of judicial impartiality, in that if he had a strong sympathy for one party to the appeal, he always found a way of deciding the case in their favour. On the other hand, Healy thought that the courtesy with which he conducted every appeal, and the deep interest he took in the legal arguments, made appearing in front of him "an intellectual treat". Delaney praises Fitzgibbon both for his profound erudition and his innate sense of justice. However he agrees with Healy that FitzGibbon, like Lord Ashbourne, was a pragmatist, who would always try to find in favour of the party he believed to have justice on their side, even if the precedents pointed the other way. Palles and Holmes, by contrast, although they were no less anxious to do justice between the parties, went strictly by the precedents.

=== Quinn v Leathem ===
Fitzgibbon went regularly on assizes, most often to Belfast. It was there in 1896 that he sat as the trial judge, with a jury, in the controversial case of Quinn v Leathem. The House of Lords subsequently found that for several members of a trade union to ask a businessman only to deal with customers who employ union labour amounts to a conspiracy to injure him, even though such a request, when made by an individual, had previously been found by the same tribunal in Allen v Flood to be perfectly lawful. While the judgment on appeal aroused great indignation among trade unions, FitzGibbon, from the report of his summing up to the jury, seems to have stated the law (as it stood at the time) correctly.

=== Judicial style ===
His judgments were written in a clear, sharp and decisive style, often with an abrupt opening sentence such as: "I doubt that the [Court of] King's Bench can have been conscious of the consequences of its decision in this case".

A good example of his judicial style can be found in Aaron's Reefs v Twiss, where the Court of Appeal divided on the question of whether certain statements in a company's prospectus were simply "optimistic" or actually fraudulent. FitzGibbon found that there is no legal difference between a company which omits crucial facts from its prospectus and one which deliberately misrepresents the facts, remarking that: "if a company cannot be floated if the whole truth be disclosed by its prospectus, it cannot be honestly launched at all". To the argument that the application of this standard of commercial honesty would be fatal to most company prospectuses, he observed drily: "So much the better".

== Political and social life ==
He was a Conservative in politics, and a close friend of Lord Randolph Churchill; it was in a letter to FitzGibbon in 1886 that Churchill remarked that to effectively oppose the support of Liberal Party Prime Minister Gladstone for Irish Home Rule, "the Orange card would be the one to play". Yet FitzGibbon was noted for his political moderation: he had a wide circle of friends of differing political views, and his daughter Anne married a close relative of Gladstone. His house, Kilrock, on the Hill of Howth, was one of the centres of Dublin social life: here he entertained not only his legal colleagues, but many of the leading Irish and British politicians of the day. His Christmas parties at Kilrock were for many years one of the high points of the Dublin social calendar.

He was a man of great erudition, and had numerous interests outside the law. He was a devoted member of the Church of Ireland, and spoke eloquently in 1904 of his confidence in the future of "the Church which I love". He was a member of the General Synod of the Church: he was called the most influential Protestant laymen of his time, and was rewarded with a statue in St. Patrick's Cathedral. At the same time he was an active Freemason, and contributed much of his time and money to Masonic causes and charities.

He took a deep interest in the future of Irish education, and chaired a committee on educational endowments from 1885 to 1897. He gave evidence to the Royal Commission on the future of Trinity College Dublin, and the University of Dublin in 1906. He strongly defended the university's policy on the admission of Catholics, pointing out that Chief Baron Palles – one of his most distinguished colleagues on the Bench – was a Catholic graduate of the same university, and shared FitzGibbon's deep attachment to it. He generously praised Clongowes Wood College, Palles's old school, as an example of the best of Roman Catholic education.

He was a member of both the Privy Council of Ireland and from 1900 of the British Privy Council.

== Death and tributes ==
He died rather suddenly at Kilrock on 14 October 1909. The next day the Lord Chief Justice of England in open court paid tribute to "that great judge, profound lawyer and man of wide and varied learning". This is apparently the only time an Irish judge has been honoured in this way. The Times paid him an equally glowing tribute, describing him as a man whose gifts could have easily seen him rise to the top of the political rather than the judicial sphere.

He is buried in old St. Fintan's Cemetery, Sutton, near the ruined church. His statue (picture above) stands in the North Aisle of St Patrick's Cathedral, Dublin.

== Family ==
He married in 1864 Margaret Ann FitzGerald, daughter of Francis Alexander FitzGerald, Baron of the Court of Exchequer and his wife Janet Burton. They had seven children, including Gerald Fitzgibbon the third, who represented the Dublin University from 1921 to 1923 and served as a judge of the Supreme Court of Ireland from 1924 to 1938. Of his daughters Janet married General Sir William Shone, and Anne married John Gladstone, great-nephew of the celebrated statesman. The family were members of the Church of Ireland.

== In literature ==
He appears briefly in Ulysses by James Joyce.

Legal offices
Preceded by Hon. David Plunket	Solicitor-General for Ireland; 1878–1880	Succeeded by Hugh Holmes
