= Valentine Holmes (barrister) =

British barrister

Sir Valentine Holmes, QC (24 July 1888 – 19 November 1956) was a British barrister who served as Junior Counsel to the Treasury (Common Law), commonly known as Treasury Devil, from 1935 to 1945. Almost uniquely among treasury devils, he was not elevated to the High Court bench, but instead remained at the bar after his service.

The third son of Hugh Holmes, an Irish Unionist politician and judge, Valentine Holmes was educated at Charterhouse and Trinity College, Dublin, before being called to the English bar at the Inner Temple and the Middle Temple in 1913. During the First World War, he served in the Royal Artillery. After the war, he joined the chambers of Sir Leslie Scott and although the development of his practice was initially slow, he soon acquired a large practice, as well as a reputation as a libel specialist.
