= Sir Andrew Porter, 1st Baronet =

British politician (1837–1919)

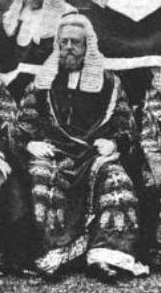
- In The Sketch, 4 November 1896
- Born: 27 June 1837; Belfast, Ireland
- Died: 9 January 1919 (aged 81); Dublin, Ireland
- Education: Royal Belfast Academical Institution; Queen's University, Belfast
- Occupations: Lawyer, judge
- Spouse: Agnes Horsburgh
- Children: 6, including John and Andrew
- Parents: John Scott Porter (father); Margaret Marshall (mother)

Sir Andrew Marshall Porter, 1st Baronet PC, QC (27 June 1837 – 9 January 1919) was an Irish lawyer and judge.

== Background and education ==
Porter was born in Belfast, the son of Reverend John Scott Porter and his wife Margaret Marshall. He was educated at the Royal Belfast Academical Institution, and Queen's University, Belfast.

== Legal and judicial career ==
In 1860 Porter was called to the Bar and by 1872 had become Queen's Counsel. He sat as Member of Parliament for County Londonderry from 1881 to 1884 and served under William Ewart Gladstone as Solicitor-General for Ireland from 1881 to 1882 and as Attorney-General for Ireland from 1882 to 1883: he was deeply involved in the trials following the Phoenix Park murders. He was appointed Master of the Rolls in Ireland in 1883 and served in that post until 1907. It was announced that he would receive a baronetcy in the 1902 Coronation Honours list published on 26 June 1902 for the (subsequently postponed) coronation of King Edward VII, and on 24 July 1902, he was created a Baronet, of Merrion square, in the city and county of Dublin.

A. M. Sullivan described him as "a fine lawyer of noble presence and true dignity" who did not tolerate any disturbance to the decorum of his Court. As a judge, Sullivan ranked him as one of the four greatest he had ever known, and perhaps the equal of the celebrated Christopher Palles.

== Family ==
Porter married Agnes Horsburgh and they had six children:

- Helen Violet Porter (d. 1961), unmarried
- Margaret Porter, married Capt. Cuthbert Avenal John Vernon
- Sir John Scott Horsburgh-Porter, 2nd Baronet (1871–1953), succeeded his father in the title
- Alexander Porter (1872–1946)
- Andrew Marshall Porter (1874–1900), a noted sportsman who was killed in the Second Boer War
- William Francis Porter (1878–1903)

While living in Dublin, Porter resided at 42 Merrion Square East, as noted in Ulysses by James Joyce. He died there on 9 January 1919.

== Arms ==
Coat of arms of Sir Andrew Porter, 1st Baronet
Notes Granted 1 September 1902 by Sir Arthur Edward Vicars, Ulster King of Arms Crest On a wreath of the colours on a fasces fesswise a cherub Proper. Escutcheon Argent on a bend Azure three bells of the field in chief a portcullis and in base two keys in saltire Sable. Motto J'ayme Porter Sacours

Parliament of the United Kingdom
Preceded by Sir Thomas McClure, Bt; Hugh Law	Member of Parliament for Londonderry; 1881–1883; With: Sir Thomas McClure, Bt	Succeeded by Samuel Walker; Sir Thomas McClure, 1st Bt
Legal offices
Preceded by William Moore Johnson	Solicitor-General for Ireland; 1881–1882	Succeeded by John Naish
Preceded by William Moore Johnson	Attorney-General for Ireland; 1882–1883	Succeeded by John Naish
Preceded by Edward Sullivan	Master of the Rolls in Ireland; 1883–1906	Succeeded by Richard Edmund Meredith
Peerage of the United Kingdom
New creation	Baronet (of Merrion Square); 1902–1919	Succeeded by John Scott Horsbrugh-Porter
