= Edmund Thomas Bewley =

Irish lawyer and genealogist

Sir Edmund Thomas Bewley
- Born: 1837
- Died: 1908

Sir Edmund Thomas Bewley (1837–1908), Irish lawyer and genealogist.

He was the son of Edward Bewley (1806–1876), licentiate of the Royal Colleges of Surgeons and Physicians, Ireland, by his wife Mary, daughter of Thomas Mulock of Kilnagarna, King's County (1791–1857).

== Life ==
Born in Dublin on 11 January 1837, entering Trinity College, Dublin, in 1855, he obtained a classical scholarship in 1857, and a first senior moderatorship and gold medal in experimental science in 1859. In 1860 he graduated with a BA and in 1863 M.A. In 1885, he gained his LL.D. In 1861 he obtained the degree of BA, ad eundem, and also that of MA, with honours and first gold medal in experimental science, in the Queen's (afterwards Royal) Queen's University of Ireland. Called to the Irish Bar in 1862, he practised successfully for some years, and in 1882 took silk. From 1884 to 1890 he was Regius Professor of Feudal and English Law at Trinity College Dublin, and in 1890 became a judge of the supreme court of judicature of Ireland, and judicial commissioner of the Irish Land Commission. Owing to declining health he retired in 1898, when he was knighted by the Lord Lieutenant of Ireland. He was elected F.S.A. on 10 January 1908, and died at Dublin on 27 June 1908.

Bewley married in 1866 Anna Sophie Stewart Colles, daughter of Henry Colles, a member of the Irish bar, and his wife Elizabeth Mayne, and granddaughter of the eminent surgeon Abraham Colles, and by her had two sons and one daughter. Edward Gibson, 1st Baron Ashbourne, Lord Chancellor of Ireland, was his brother-in-law.

== Genealogical work ==
Bewley spent his leisure in genealogical pursuits. He was a frequent contributor to the Genealogist, Ancestor, and other genealogical periodicals. His most important researches were privately printed. His three books, The Bewleys of Cumberland (1902), The Family of Mulock (1905), and The Family of Poe (1906) are investigations into family history; in the monograph on the Poe family, he proved that Edgar Allan Poe was descended from a family of Powell, for generations tenant-farmers in County Cavan.

== Other works ==
Bewley was also the author of:

- The Law and Practice of Taxation of Costs (1867)
- A Treatise on the Common Law Procedure Acts (1871)

and joint-author of A Treatise on the Chancery (Ireland) Act, 1867 (1868). (Note: The Bewleys of Cumberland, 1902; The Times, 29 June 1908; Dublin Nat, Libr. Catalogue; Irish Times, 28 June 1908.])

== Arms ==
Coat of arms of Edmund Thomas Bewley
Notes Confirmed 1 November 1901 by Sir Arthur Edward Vicars, Ulster King of Arms Crest On a wreath of the colours an ibex's head Or issuant from the centre of a rose Gules stalked and leaved Proper. Escutcheon Argent a chevron Sable between three Cornish choughs' heads erased Proper in chief an Ermine spot. Motto Virtutis Cloria Merces
