= Edward Gibson, 1st Baron Ashbourne =

Anglo-Irish lawyer (1837–1913)

The Right Honourable The Lord Ashbourne PC KC
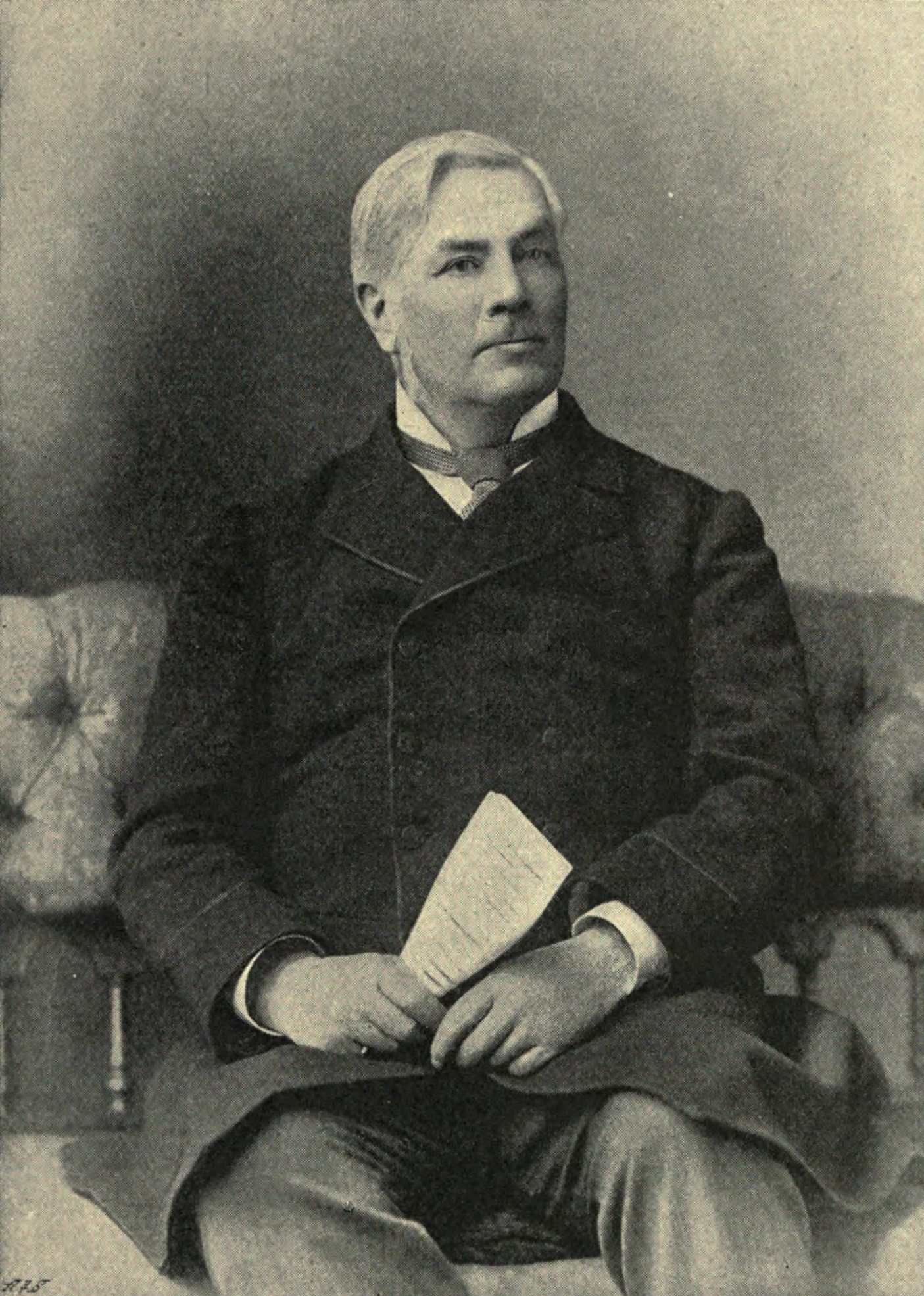
- Lord Ashbourne, by Dickinson.

Lord Chancellor of Ireland
- In office 1885–1886
- Monarch: Victoria
- Preceded by: John Naish
- Succeeded by: John Naish
- In office 1886–1892
- Monarch: Victoria
- Preceded by: John Naish
- Succeeded by: Samuel Walker
- In office 1895–1905
- Monarchs: Victoria; Edward VII
- Preceded by: Samuel Walker
- Succeeded by: Samuel Walker

Attorney-General for Ireland
- In office 1877–1880
- Monarch: Victoria
- Preceded by: George Augustus Chichester May
- Succeeded by: Hugh Law

Member of Parliament for Dublin University alongside David Robert Plunket
- In office 1875–1885
- Preceded by: John Thomas Bell
- Succeeded by: Hugh Holmes

Personal details
- Born: 4 September 1837 Dublin, Ireland
- Died: 22 May 1913 (aged 75) London, England
- Spouse: Frances Maria Adelaide Colles (m. 1868)
- Children: 8, including William and Violet
- Education: Trinity College Dublin

Edward Gibson, 1st Baron Ashbourne PC KC (4 September 1837 – 22 May 1913), was an Anglo-Irish lawyer and Lord Chancellor of Ireland.

== Background and education ==
Born at 22 Merrion Square, Dublin, Gibson was the son of William Gibson J.P. (1808–1872), of Rockforest, County Tipperary, and Merrion Square, Dublin, by his first wife, Louisa, daughter of Joseph Grant, barrister of Dublin. He was the elder brother of John George Gibson, who was also a distinguished lawyer and judge of the High Court. He was educated at Trinity College Dublin, graduating BA in 1858, winning the gold medal in History, English Literature and Political Science. He was also an Auditor and a Gold Medallist of the College Historical Society, and became its president in 1883.

== Legal and judicial career ==
Having been called to the Irish bar in 1860, Gibson was made an Irish Queen's Counsel in 1872 and three years later was elected Conservative Member of Parliament for Dublin University after unsuccessfully contesting Waterford. Enjoying the patronage of Benjamin Disraeli, Sir Stafford Northcote and Lord Randolph Churchill, he was appointed Attorney-General for Ireland in 1877, before being admitted to the Irish Privy Council, and then appointed Lord Chancellor of Ireland in 1885, becoming a British Privy Counsellor that same year.

On his appointment as Lord Chancellor, Gibson was raised to the peerage as Baron Ashbourne, of Ashbourne in the County of Meath, in 1885. He was almost single-handedly responsible for the drafting of the Purchase of Land (Ireland) Act 1885 which was commonly known as the Ashbourne Act.

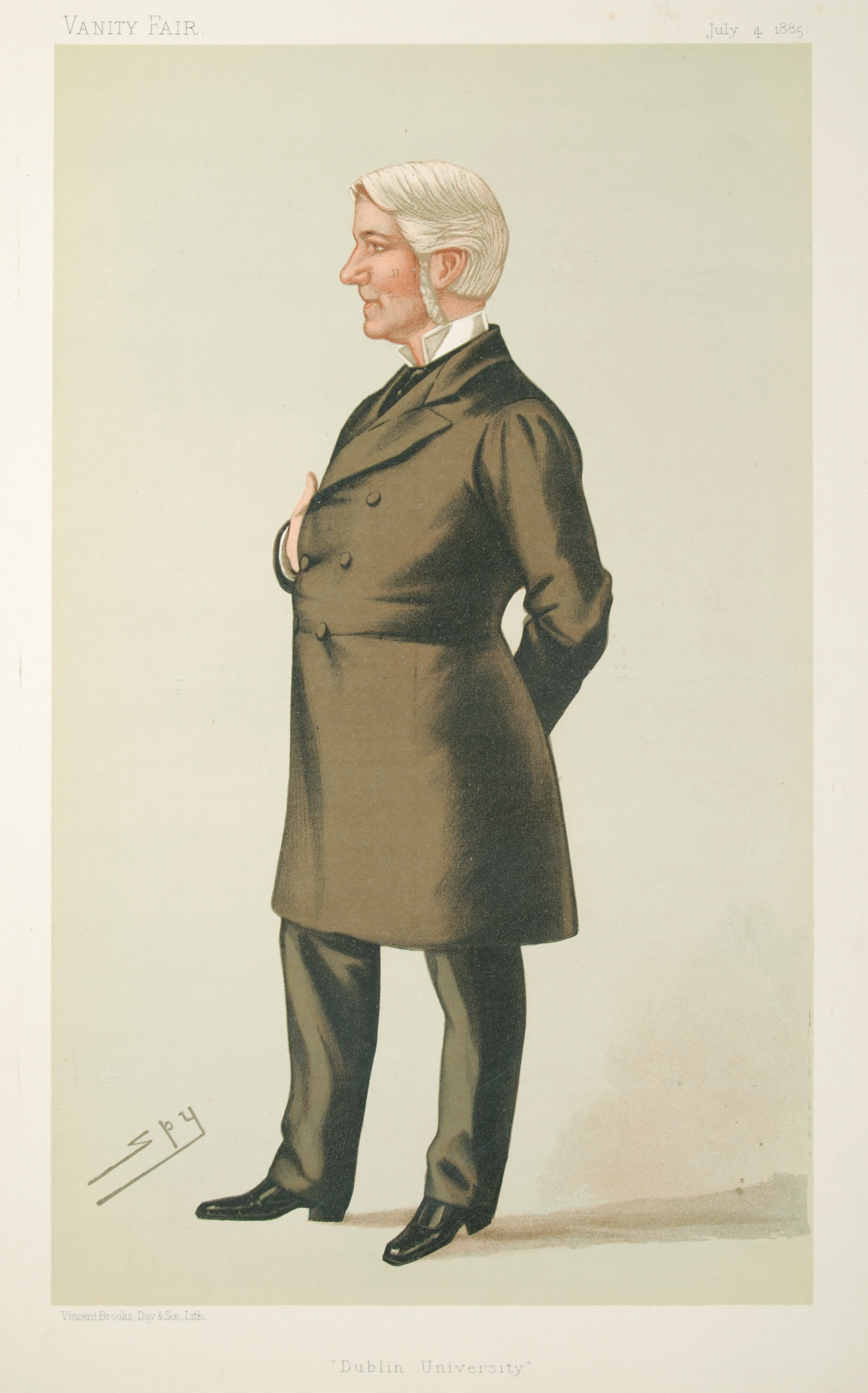
Lord Ashbourne by Leslie Ward, 1885.

He resigned the Lord Chancellor's office in February 1886 on the return of the Liberals to power, but was reappointed by Lord Salisbury in August of that year. For the next twenty years (with a short interval of three years when Gladstone returned to power in 1892), Lord Ashbourne held office as Lord Chancellor of Ireland, finally retiring at the age of 68. He was highly regarded as a judge even at a time when the Irish Bench boasted such outstanding judges as Gerald FitzGibbon, Hugh Holmes and Christopher Palles. It was in part at least due to his presidency that the Irish Court of Appeal gained a reputation as the strongest court ever to sit in Ireland.

In 1900, Winston Churchill's agent Gerald Christie secured Ashbourne's services to take the chair and introduce the journalist politician's Dublin lecture on his South African Adventures.

== Family ==
Lord Ashbourne married Frances Maria Adelaide Colles (1849–1926), daughter of barrister Henry Jonathan Cope Colles and his wife Elizabeth Mary, daughter of John Mayne of Dublin, in 1868. Lady Ashbourne was a niece of John Dawson Mayne and granddaughter of Abraham Colles; her sister Anna married another eminent judge Sir Edmund Thomas Bewley.

They lived in Fitzwilliam Square and produced four sons, the eldest son and heir being William Gibson, 2nd Baron Ashbourne, and four daughters. One of their daughters, Violet Gibson, made an attempt to assassinate Benito Mussolini in 1926. Lord Ashbourne died in London in 1913 and was cremated at Golders Green Crematorium, his ashes being placed in Mount Jerome Cemetery, Dublin. In Dublin, he was a member of the Kildare Street Club.

== Arms ==
Coat of arms of Edward Gibson, 1st Baron Ashbourne
Crest On a bank of reeds a pelican in her piety all Proper. Escutcheon Ermine three keys fesswise in pale Azure and in chief as many trefoils slipped Vert. Supporters Dexter a female figure representing Mercy her interior hand resting on a sword point downwards all Proper; sinister a female figure representing Justice holding in her left hand a sword point upwards and in her right hand a balance all Proper; each charged on the breast with a trefoil slipped Vert and each standing on a fasces also Proper. Motto Coelestes Pandite Portae

Parliament of the United Kingdom
Preceded by John Thomas Ball; David Plunket	Member of Parliament for Dublin University; 1875–1885; With: David Plunket	Succeeded by Hugh Holmes; David Plunket
Legal offices
Preceded by George Augustus Chichester May	Attorney-General for Ireland; 1877–1880	Succeeded by Hugh Law
Political offices
Preceded by John Naish	Lord Chancellor of Ireland; 1885–1886	Succeeded by John Naish
Preceded by John Naish	Lord Chancellor of Ireland; 1886–1892	Succeeded by Samuel Walker
Preceded by Samuel Walker	Lord Chancellor of Ireland; 1895–1905	Succeeded by Samuel Walker
Peerage of the United Kingdom
New creation	Baron Ashbourne; 1886–1913	Succeeded by William Gibson
