= David Plunket, 1st Baron Rathmore =

Irish lawyer and politician

The Right Honourable The Lord Rathmore PC KC
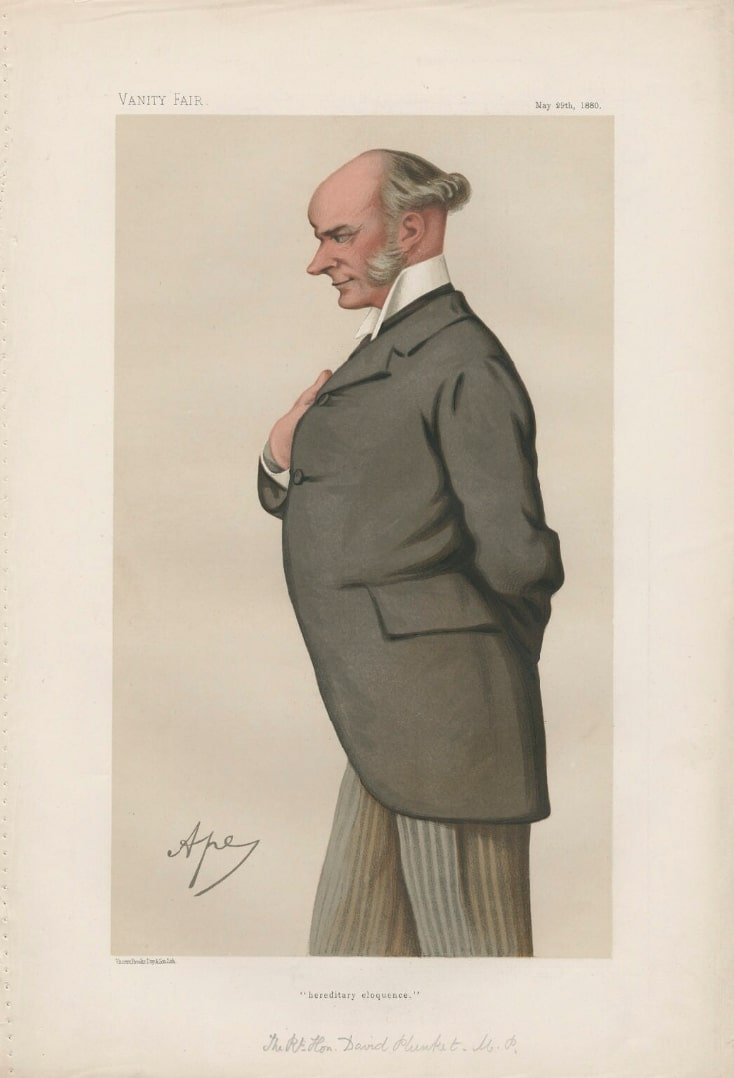
- "hereditary eloquence" Plunket as caricatured by Ape (Carlo Pellegrini) in Vanity Fair, May 1880

Paymaster General
- In office 24 March 1880 – 21 April 1880
- Monarch: Victoria
- Prime Minister: The Earl of Beaconsfield
- Preceded by: Sir Stephen Cave
- Succeeded by: The Lord Wolverton

First Commissioner of Works
- In office 24 June 1885 – 28 January 1886
- Monarch: Victoria
- Prime Minister: The Marquess of Salisbury
- Preceded by: The Earl of Rosebery
- Succeeded by: The Earl of Morley
- In office 5 August 1886 – 11 August 1892
- Monarch: Victoria
- Prime Minister: The Marquess of Salisbury
- Preceded by: The Earl of Elgin
- Succeeded by: George Shaw-Lefevre

Personal details
- Born: 3 December 1838
- Died: 22 August 1919 (aged 80) Greenore, County Louth
- Resting place: Putney Vale Cemetery, London; 51.440739°N 0.238533°W
- Party: Conservative
- Education: Trinity College Dublin

David Robert Plunket, 1st Baron Rathmore PC, KC (3 December 1838 – 22 August 1919) was an Irish lawyer and Conservative politician.

== Background and education ==
Plunket was the third son of John Plunket, 3rd Baron Plunket, second son of William Plunket, 1st Baron Plunket, Lord Chancellor of Ireland. His mother was Charlotte, daughter of Charles Kendal Bushe, Lord Chief Justice of Ireland, while the Most Reverend William Plunket, 4th Baron Plunket, Archbishop of Dublin, was his elder brother. He was educated at Trinity College Dublin and was called to the Irish Bar in 1862.

== Political and legal career ==
After practising on the Munster Circuit for a number of years, Plunket was made a Queen's Counsel in 1868, and became Law Adviser to the Lord Lieutenant of Ireland that same year. In 1870, he was elected Conservative Member of Parliament for Dublin University, and was Solicitor General for Ireland under Benjamin Disraeli from 1875 to 1877. He was then briefly Paymaster General under Disraeli (then known as the Earl of Beaconsfield) in 1880 and was sworn of the Privy Council the same year. In 1885 he became First Commissioner of Works in Lord Salisbury's first ministry, a post he held until January 1886. He resumed the same post in August of the same year when the Conservatives returned to power, and held it until 1892. On his retirement from the House of Commons in 1895 he was elevated to the peerage as Baron Rathmore, of Shanganagh in the County of Dublin.

Apart from his political and legal career he was a director of the Suez Canal Company, Chairman of the North London Railway for many years and a director of the Central London Railway at its opening in 1900..

== Personal life ==
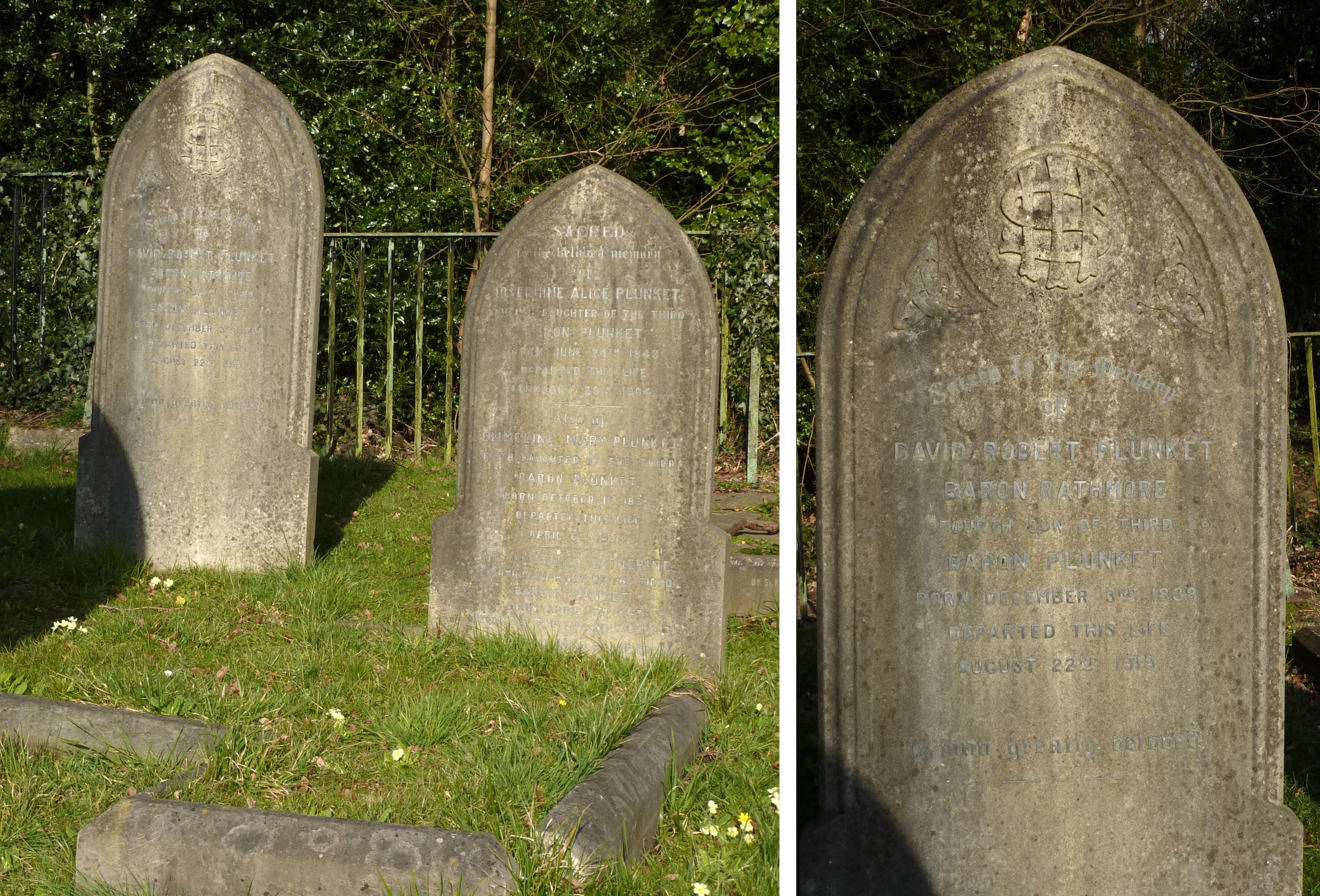
The grave of David Plunket and other family members at Putney Vale Cemetery, London, in 2015

In Dublin, Rathmore was a member of the Kildare Street Club. He died in August 1919, unmarried, at the age of eighty, in the Railway Hotel in Greenore, County Louth and is buried at Putney Vale Cemetery in London. His peerage became extinct at his death.

Parliament of the United Kingdom
Preceded by Anthony Lefroy; John Thomas Ball	Member of Parliament for Dublin University; 1870–1895; With: John Thomas Ball 1870–1875; Edward Gibson 1875–1885; Hugh Holmes 1885–1887; Dodgson Hamilton Madden 1887–1892; Edward Carson 1892–1895	Succeeded by Edward Carson; W. E. H. Lecky
Political offices
Preceded by Sir Stephen Cave	Paymaster General; 1880	Succeeded by The Lord Wolverton
Preceded by The Earl of Rosebery	First Commissioner of Works; 1885–1886	Succeeded by The Earl of Morley
Preceded by The Earl of Elgin	First Commissioner of Works; 1886–1892	Succeeded by George Shaw-Lefevre
Legal offices
Preceded by Henry Ormsby	Solicitor General for Ireland; 1875–1877	Succeeded by Gerald Fitzgibbon
Peerage of the United Kingdom
New creation	Baron Rathmore; 1895–1919	Extinct
