= Hugh Holmes =

Irish politician (1840–1916)

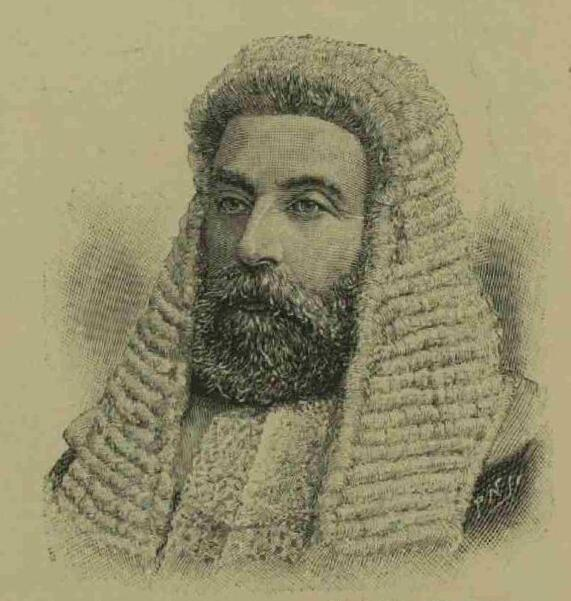
- Born: 17 February 1840; Dungannon, Ireland
- Died: 18 April 1916 (aged 76); Dublin, Ireland
- Education: Royal School Dungannon; Trinity College Dublin
- Occupations: Politician, judge
- Political party: Conservative
- Spouse: Olivia Moule (m. 1869; died 1901)
- Children: 7, including Valentine

Hugh Holmes QC (17 February 1840 – 18 April 1916) was an Irish Conservative Party, then after 1886 a Unionist Member of Parliament (MP) in the United Kingdom Parliament and subsequently a Judge of the High Court and Court of Appeal in Ireland.

== Background and education ==
Holmes was born in Dungannon, County Tyrone, the son of William Holmes of Dungannon and Anne Maxwell. He attended the Royal School Dungannon and Trinity College Dublin. He was called to the English bar in 1864 and to the Irish Bar in 1865.

== Legal and judicial career ==
Holmes became a Queen's Counsel (QC) in 1877. He was appointed Solicitor General for Ireland on 14 December 1878 and served until the Conservative government was defeated in 1880. He served as Attorney General for Ireland from 1885 to 1886 and again from 1886 to 1887. He was made a member of the Privy Council of Ireland on 2 July 1885. He was MP for Dublin University from 1885 to 1887.

Holmes resigned from the House of Commons on his appointment as a judge in 1887. He was a Justice of the Common Pleas Division of the High Court of Justice in Ireland until 1888 when he became a Justice of the Queen's Bench Division. He was promoted to be a Lord Justice of Appeal in 1897. Ill health caused his retirement in 1914.

He appeared to be a stern judge, who did not suffer fools gladly and often imposed exceptionally severe sentences in criminal cases. Although the story is often thought to be apocryphal, Maurice Healy maintained that Holmes did once sentence a man of great age to 15 years in prison, and when the prisoner pleaded that he could not do 15 years, replied "Do as much of it as you can". His judgments did, however, display some good humour and humanity, and the sentences he imposed often turned out to be less severe in practice than those he announced in Court.

The quality of his judgments was very high and Holmes, together with Christopher Palles and Gerald FitzGibbon, is credited with earning for the Irish Court of Appeal its reputation as perhaps the strongest tribunal in Irish legal history. His retirement, followed by that of Palles (FitzGibbon had died in 1909), caused a loss of expertise in the Court of Appeal from which its reputation never recovered. Among his more celebrated remarks is that the Irish "have too much of a sense of humour to dance around a maypole". His judgment in The SS Gairloch remains the authoritative statement in Irish law on the circumstances in which an appellate court can overturn findings of fact made by the trial judge.

== Family ==
In 1869 Hugh Holmes married Olivia Moule, daughter of J.W. Moule of Sneads Green House, Elmley Lovett, Worcestershire and Jane Harvie; she died in 1901. Her sister Elizabeth married another prominent Irish judge, John Monroe. Hugh and Olivia had seven children, including Hugh junior, Sir Valentine Holmes QC (1888-1956), who like his father was a very successful barrister, and a noted expert on the law of libel, Violet (died 1966), who married Sir Denis Henry, 1st Baronet, the first Lord Chief Justice of Northern Ireland, Elizabeth, who married the politician and academic Harold Lawson Murphy, author of a well known History of Trinity College Dublin, and Alice (died 1942), who married the politician and judge Edward Sullivan Murphy, Attorney General for Northern Ireland and Lord Justice of Appeal in Northern Ireland.

Hugh Holmes died at his home in Dublin on 18 April 1916.

Parliament of the United Kingdom
Preceded by David Plunket; Edward Gibson	Member of Parliament for Dublin University; 1885–1887; With: David Plunket	Succeeded by David Plunket; Dodgson Hamilton Madden
Legal offices
Preceded by Gerald FitzGibbon	Solicitor-General for Ireland; 1878–1880	Succeeded by William Moore Johnson
Preceded by Samuel Walker	Attorney-General for Ireland; 1885–1886	Succeeded by Samuel Walker
Preceded by Samuel Walker	Attorney-General for Ireland; 1886–1887	Succeeded by John George Gibson
