= Maurice Healy (writer) =

Irish writer (1887–1943)

Maurice F. Healy BL, MC (1887–1943) was an Irish lawyer and author, who is best remembered for his legal memoir The Old Munster Circuit.

He was born in Cork, son of the well-known solicitor Maurice Healy and nephew of Tim Healy, the first Governor-General of the Irish Free State. His mother was a sister of A.M. Sullivan, who was the last barrister to hold the title Serjeant, and was noted for his unsuccessful defence of Roger Casement. Timothy Sullivan, the second Chief Justice of Ireland, was a cousin of Maurice, as was Kevin O'Higgins, a leading figure in the early Irish Free State Government.

Maurice was educated at Clongowes Wood College and University College Dublin. He was called to the Irish Bar in 1910, and to the English Bar in 1914 and saw action in the First World War on the Western Front and at Gallipoli. He received the MC in 1919 after serving in France and also in Germany during the immediate post-war occupation.

Maurice stood for Parliament in the December 1910 United Kingdom general election as a All-for-Ireland League candidate for West Waterford. After the Irish War of Independence, while several of his close relatives became prominent political figures in the Irish Free State, he chose to practice at the English Bar. While he would have been happy enough to see Ireland gain Home Rule by peaceful means, he had a horror of revolutionary violence (although he also denounced the crimes committed by the Black and Tans) and he seems to have found life in the Irish Free State uncongenial. He was made King's Counsel in 1931. He became Recorder of Coventry in 1941; it was suggested this might be the prelude to a High Court judgeship, but any such hope was cut short by his premature death.

He wrote celebrated books on wine – Claret and the white wines of Bordeaux (1934), and Stay me with Flagons (1940). He also wrote poetry, mostly light and humorous. His most famous work is The Old Munster Circuit (1939), an affectionate and nostalgic portrait of life at the Irish Bar, especially on the Munster (Southern) Circuit between 1900 and 1920. The book was an instant success; The Spectator called it "Entirely delightful to read" and it has retained its popularity ever since.

With André Simon (who referred to Healy as 'my dearly beloved disciple') and others he founded the Saintsbury Club in 1931, which still meets today, reportedly stating that it should be created `to perpetuate and honour his name' (Professor George Saintsbury).

A popular wit and conversationalist, Healy also made a number of celebrated BBC broadcasts during the war years.
