= Christopher Palles =

Irish judge (1831–1920)

Chief Baron Christopher Palles
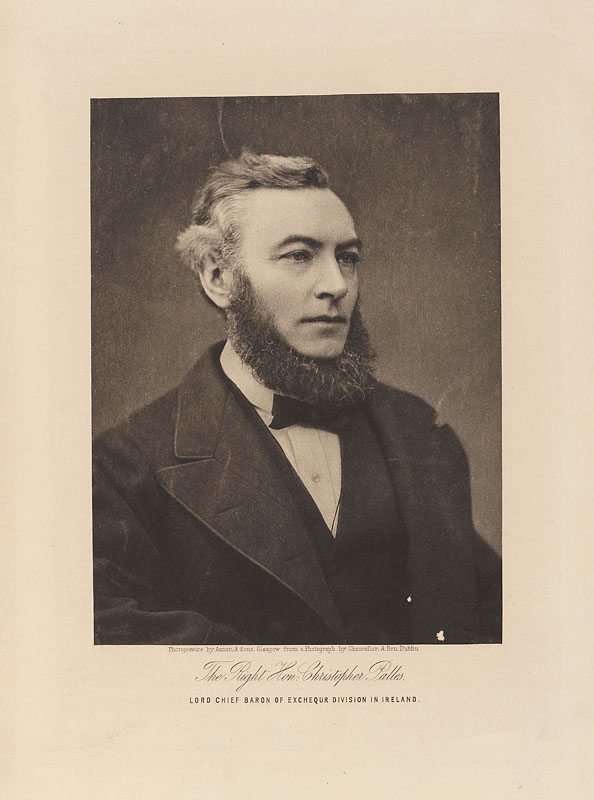

Lord Chief Baron of the Exchequer in Ireland
- In office 1874–1916
- Preceded by: David Richard Pigot
- Succeeded by: None

Attorney General for Ireland
- In office 1872–1873
- Preceded by: Richard Dowse
- Succeeded by: Hugh Law

Personal details
- Born: 25 December 1831 Lower Gardiner Street, Dublin, Ireland
- Died: 14 February 1929 (aged 97) Dublin, Ireland

Christopher Palles (25 December 1831 – 14 February 1920) was an Irish barrister, Solicitor-General, Attorney-General and a judge for over 40 years. His biographer, Vincent Thomas Hyginus Delany, described him as "the greatest of the Irish judges". He served as the last Lord Chief Baron of the Exchequer from 1874 until his retirement from the bench in 1916.

== Early life ==
Palles was born on Christmas Day 1831 on Lower Gardiner Street in Dublin City. He was the third son of Andrew Christopher Palles (1801–1880), a solicitor, and his wife Eleanor Mary Palles née Plunkett) (1801–1877). Another son was Andrew Christopher Palles, who became an architect. Palles's ancestors (the earliest known version of the surname is de Palatio) were of Italian origin, and came to Ireland in the late fifteenth century in the entourage of their relative Ottaviano Spinelli de Palatio, who was Papal Legate, and Archbishop of Armagh from 1478 to 1513.

Palles was educated at Clongowes Wood College and Trinity College Dublin, from where he graduated in 1852, having been a non-Foundation Scholar (Catholics were not allowed to be full 'Scholars of the House') in Mathematics and Physics. He subsequently attended King's Inns and Gray's Inn in London.

== Career as a barrister 1853–1874 ==
Palles was called to the Irish Bar in 1853. He became Doctor of Laws and Queen's Counsel (Q.C.) in 1865. He was Solicitor General from February to November 1872. He was appointed Attorney General in that year and made a member of the Privy Council. He unsuccessfully contested the parliamentary constituency of Londonderry City in 1872: his failure to get elected was a cause of annoyance to the Government, which normally relied on the Irish Attorney General to defend its Irish policies from the floor of the House of Commons. His political positions included support for non-denominational university education.

== Chief Baron, 1874–1916 ==
In 1874 he was appointed to the bench, becoming Lord Chief Baron of the Exchequer. In 1898 the Exchequer division was merged in the Queen's Bench Division of the High Court of Justice in Ireland. From that time the Chief Baron sat as one of the judges of the Queen's Bench Division, and also as a judge of appeal. As a result of that merger, he was known as "last of the Chief Barons". During his 40 years on the Bench, he gained a reputation for eminence which has never been equalled by any other Irish judge.

In his lifetime he was considered the greatest Irish judge of his age; and he has been so regarded ever since, though his few critics attacked his tendency to decide cases on technical points rather than on the merits. Although more than 80 men held that office, V.T.H. Delaney in his biography of Palles said: "In Ireland there is only one Chief Baron". Alexander Sullivan, with his long experience of both Irish and English judges, ranked him one of the four greatest judges he had known on either the Irish or the English bench.

Maurice Healy in his memoir The Old Munster Circuit paints an affectionate picture of Chief Baron Palles as an awe-inspiring but kindly old judge; describing his manner and reputation as striking terror into young barristers, yet "we were all devoted to him". Despite his stern appearance, he had a sense of humour. Delaney records the story of a nervous Queen's Counsel who blurted out that his junior counsel did not want the judge to see a certain document: Palles, much amused, replied: "Mr O'Brien, you must never do anything of which your junior would not approve". His (judicial) portrait (1903) by Sir Hubert von Herkomer hangs in Trinity College and a copy still hangs in the Bencher's Room in the King's Inns.

In 1897 he heard French v. West Clare Railway Co. This was the West Clare Railway Company's unsuccessful appeal against an award of damages in favour of the songwriter Percy French, who sued for loss of earnings after his train arrived at Kilkee more than four hours late, causing him to miss a performance. The case did not raise any important point of law, but is still remembered as the basis for French's celebrated song Are Ye Right There Michael, which ridiculed the railway company's poor timekeeping and general inefficiency.

Palles was named in the Irish Universities Act 1908 as one of the founding Commissioners of the National University of Ireland and was chairperson of the Dublin Commissioners established under the Act. In that role, he was involved in making the first appointments of professors and lecturers in the new colleges. He became a founding member of the Governing Body of University College Dublin (UCD) on its establishment in 1909.

== Retirement and death ==
Chief Baron Palles retired from the bench, owing to age and increasing ill-health, in 1916, by letter to Prime Minister H. H. Asquith who replied that for many years to come the words of "Palles CB" would be cited with approval, a prognostication which proved to be true.

Palles died in Dublin in 1929 and is buried in Glasnevin Cemetery, Dublin.

== Personal life ==
Palles married Ellen Doyle in a Catholic ceremony in Dublin in 1862 and they had one son, also named Christopher (1863–1953). The family lived in Mountjoy Square in Dublin, then moved out to Mountanville in Clonskeagh to a site subsequently named "Knockrabo", where they cultivated a peach orchard, and to 28 Fitzwilliam Place where a town-brick neo-gothic oratory was added (and can still be seen from Leeson Street). According to his biographer, the founding meeting of the Clongowes Union was held in Palles' house in Fitzwilliam Place, with Palles presiding.

Palles's family life was not altogether happy: his wife's health was never good, and their son, as his father's will shows, needed special care throughout his very long life. Ellen Palles died on 22 June 1885.

His older brother Andrew Palles (1829–1900), who was also educated at Clongowes Wood School and Trinity College, Dublin, was a civil engineer who later became the Chief Baron's Registrar. Andrew's daughter, Elizabeth, moved in with her uncle after Mrs Palles's death and managed the household for the rest of his life.

== Legacy ==
Palles CB has left a significant and unsurpassed legacy in jurisprudence. As of 2017, over 1,000 judgments over a period of 143 years either consist of or cite his decisions, from his first reported case in Brew v. Conole (1874) 9 I.R. C.L. 151 to Kerins v. McGuinness.

His judgments are commonly cited to this day; in 1960 Delaney wrote that judges were still regularly asking "what did Palles have to say on the point?" Examples include the following:

- McGrath v. Bourne (1876) I.R. 10 C.L. 160 was considered in Rossiter (A Minor) v. Dun Laoghaire Rathdown County Council and Gough v. Neary
- R v. Faullkner (1877) 13 Cox C.C. 550 was cited in D.P.P. v. Smith [1961] AC 290 to support an objective test for mens rea in murder. The Chief Baron said (at 561) "In my judgment the law imputes to a person who wilfully commits a criminal act an intention to do everything which is the probable consequence of the act constituting the corpus delicti which actually ensues."
- Hegarty v Shine (1878) 4 LR Ir 288 was cited by the President of the High Court in Anderson v. Cooke.
- Stephenson v. Weir (1879) 4 LR Ir 369 was referred to in December 2006 in Motor Insurers Bureau of Ireland v. Hanley.
- Dillon v. O'Brien and Davis (1887) 20 LR Ir 300 was cited in Braddish v. DPP and McGrath v. DPP & Bowes v. DPP.
- Bell v. the Great Northern Railway Company of Ireland (1890) 26 LR Ir 428 was cited in Fletcher v. Commissioner of Public Works in Ireland and more recently in D.J. v. Minister for Health
- Herron v. Rathmines and Rathgar Improvement Commissioners (1890) 27 LR Ir 179 was referred to in Crilly & Farrington v. Eastern Health Board.
- National Bank v. Cullen [1894] 2 I.R. 683, a case in which Palles C.B. was a member of the Irish Court of Appeal, was cited in Smyth v. Tunney.
- Palles C.B.'s analysis in Crowley v O'Sullivan [1900] 2 I.R. 477 of the case law relating to the part performance doctrine under the Statute of Frauds was mentioned in Dakota Packaging Ltd v. AHP Manufacturing BV Trading As Wyeth Medica Ltd.
- Williamson v. Rover Cycle Company (1901) 2 IR 615 was discussed by the Supreme Court in O'Mahony v. Tyndale.
- Palles C.B.'s "[f]amous" definition of "public bar" (deriving from Quinn v. Bourke [1906] 2 I.R. 94 at 97) was cited in Ampleforth Ltd t/a The Fitzwilliam Hotel v. Cherating Ltd.
- Keogh v. Dental Hospital [1910] I.R. at p. 166 was cited in Byrne & Anor v. Radio Telefís Éireann.
- Cox v. Dublin City Distillery (No. 2) [1915] 1 IR 345 was mentioned in Carroll v. The Law Society of Ireland.
- On 18 March 2005, two judges of the High Court cited judgments of Palles C.B., in Mitchell v. Ireland (Cox v. Dublin City Distillery (No. 2) [1915] 1 I.R. 345) and Honniball v. Cunningham (McDonagh v. Davis (1875) I.R. 9 CL 300) respectively.

Palles is mentioned in the novel Ulysses by James Joyce.

His papers are held in UCD, a college he helped establish. The Palles Collection was donated to UCD in 1921 and for many years formed the basis of UCD's Law Library.

In November 2018, the Palles Society for Private Law was established, named in honour of Palles CB.

Legal offices
Preceded by Richard Dowse	Solicitor General for Ireland; 1872	Succeeded by Hugh Law
Preceded by Richard Dowse	Attorney General for Ireland; 1872–1873	Succeeded by Hugh Law
