= King's Inns =

Irish legal society

The Honorable Society of King's Inns
- Cumann Onórach Óstaí an Rí
- Type: Inn of Court
- Established: 1541; 485 years ago
- Founder: Henry VIII
- Chairperson: Hugh I. Mohan SC
- CEO and Under Treasurer: Mary Griffin
- Location: Henrietta Street, Dublin 1, Dublin, D01 KF59, Ireland; 53°21′10″N 6°16′17″W
- Website: www.kingsinns.ie

The Honorable Society of King's Inns (Note: The society uses the spelling "Honorable", although "Honourable" is now standard in Ireland and Britain.) (Irish: Cumann Onórach Óstaí an Rí) is the Inn of Court for the Bar of Ireland. Established in 1541, King's Inns is Ireland's oldest school of law and one of Ireland's significant historical environments.

The benchers of King's Inns award the degree of barrister-at-law (BL) necessary to qualify as a barrister and be called to the bar in Ireland. As well as training future and qualified barristers, the school extends its reach to a diverse community of people from legal and non-legal backgrounds offering a range of accessible part-time courses in specialist areas of the law.

== History ==
The King's Inns society was granted a royal charter by King Henry VIII in 1541, 51 years before Trinity College Dublin was founded, making it one of the oldest professional and educational institutions in the English-speaking world. The founders named their society in honour of King Henry VIII of England and his newly established Kingdom of Ireland. Initially, the society was housed in an appropriated Dominican friary in Dublin, and secured a lease of lands, originally called "Blackfriars", at Inns Quay on the north bank of the River Liffey in Dublin.

The society was reconstituted in 1607 after a period of inactivity and lost possession of its original premises twice, once at the end of the 16th century and again in the mid-18th century. A period of recovery in the 1780s led to the acquisition of the present Constitution Hill site.

In 1790, the Inns Quays site was acquired for the purposes of the Four Courts; the foundation stone at the present building at the top of Henrietta Street was laid on 1 August 1800, with James Gandon being commissioned as the architect. The building was completed by his pupil Henry Aaron Baker. Turn Again Lane, adjacent to the grounds, was renamed King's Inns Street.

For much of its history, the society functioned more as a club than an educational institution. Irishmen who wished to practise as barristers were primarily educated at the English Inns of Court in London until the late 19th century. It was only from the mid-18th century onwards that courses of legal education were provided at King's Inns.

Some academics have cited the early history of the King's Inns as an instrument by the colonial power for controlling Irish lawyers due to its practice of excluding Catholics from legal practice until the late 18th century until the overturning of Penal laws.

King's Inns initially hoped the 1920–1922 partition of Ireland would not end its all-island remit, and it set up a "Committee of Fifteen" Northern Ireland benchers in 1922. These sought more independence, and separatism was fuelled by King's Inns admitting in 1925 as a barrister Kevin O'Higgins, who had not sat the exams but was Minister for Justice in the Irish Free State. In 1926, a separate inn of court in Northern Ireland catered for the Bar of Northern Ireland. In 1929, Hugh Kennedy succeeded in making knowledge of Irish compulsory for admission to King's Inns.

== List of Treasurers from 1804 to 1979 ==
List of treasurers from 1804 to 1979 (Note: Notes on list: LCJ: Lord Chief Justice; MR: Master of the Rolls; KC: King's Counsel; QC: Queen's Counsel; SC: Senior Counsel)
1804–1805 Viscount Avonmore
1805–1806 William Downes
1806–1807 Lord Norbury
1807–1808 S. O'Grady
1808–1809 No name
1809–1810 Mr. Justice Day
1810–1811 No name
1811–1812 Mr. Justice Fox
1812–1813 No name
1813–1814 W.C. Smith
1814–1815 Charles Osbourne
1815–1816 Baron McCleland
1816–1817 Judge Mayne
1817–1818 Mr. Justice Fletcher
1818–1819 Judge Arthur Moore
1819–1820 Judge Johnson
1820–1821 Judge Jebb
1821–1822 No name
1822–1823 Mr. Justice Burton
1823–1824 Baron Pennefather
1824–1825 Charles Kendal Bushe, LCJ
1825–1826 Mr. Justice Vandeleur
1826–1827 Mr. Justice Torrens
1827–1828 William MacMahon, Master of the Rolls in Ireland
1828–1829 Lord Plunket
1829–1830 No name
1830–1831 S. O'Grady
1831–1832 Sir William Smith. Bt.
1832–1833 John Leslie Foster
1833–1834 John Doherty
1834–1835 Henry Joy
1835–1836 Mr. Justice Burton
1836–1837 No name
1837–1838 Mr. Justice Torrens
1838–1839 Baron Foster
1839–1840 Judge Crampton
1840–1841 Judge Perrin
1841–1842 No name
1842–1843 Baron Richards
1843–1844 Nicholas Ball
1844–1845 No name
1845–1846 Thomas Lefroy
1846–1847 Edward Pennefather, LCJ
1847–1848 Francis Blackburn, LCJ
1848–1849 T. B. C. Smith, MR
1849–1850 David R. Pigot
1850–1851 Judge Moore
1851–1852 James Henry Monahan, LCJ of the Common Pleas Court
1852–1853 The Lord Chancellor
1853–1854 Baron Greene
1854–1855 No name
1855–1856 Thomas Lefroy
1856–1857 T. B. C. Smith, MR
1857–1858 No name
1858–1859 James Henry Monahan, LCJ of the Common Pleas Court
1859–1860 Mr. Justice Christian
1860–1861 Mr. Justice O'Brien
1861–1862 Mr. Justice Hayes
1862–1863 Baron Fitzgerald
1863–1864 No name
1864–1865 Baron Fitzgerald
1865–1866 Baron Deasy
1866–1867 Mr. Justice O'Hagan
1867–1868 James Whiteside, LCJ
1868–1869 The Lord Chancellor
1869–1870 No name
1870–1871 Mr. Justice Lawson
1871–1872 George Battersby, QC
1872–1873 Lord Justice Gerald FitzGibbon
1873–1874 Baron Dowse
1874–1875 Michael Morris, Baron Morris
1875–1876 Robert Warren, Judge of the Irish Court of Probate
1876–1877 Hewitt Poole Jellett
1877–1878 Mr. Justice Barry
1878–1879 James Murphy QC
1879–1880 George Augustus Chichester May
1880–1881 Edward Pennefather, QC
1881–1882 Mr. Justice Michael Harrison
1882–1883 Mr. Serjeant David Sherlock (First Serjeant at Law)
1883-1884 Judge John FitzHenry Townsend
1884–1885 Thomas De Moleyns, QC
1885–1886 Andrew M. Porter, MR
1886–1887 Piers F. White, QC
1887–1888 The Lord Chief Baron of the Exchequer
1888–1889 Arthur Stanley Jackson, QC
1889–1890 Lord Justice FitzGibbon
1890–1891 John Richardson, QC
1891–1892 Mr. Justice Hugh Holmes
1892–1893 Sir Samuel Walker, 1st Baronet
1893–1894 Judge Miller
1894–1895 Charles Hare Hemphill, QC, Solicitor General
1895–1896 Mr. Justice Johnson
1896–1897 William Bennett Campion, QC
1897–1898 Mr. Justice O'Brien
1898–1899 No name
1899–1900 Mr. Justice Andrews
1900–1901 John H. Twigg, QC
1902–1903 Stephen Ronan KC
1903–1904 Sir Walter Boyd, 1st Baronet
1904–1905 Mr. Serjeant William Huston Dodd (Third Serjeant-at-law (Ireland))
1905-1906 Mr. Justice Madden
1906–1907 James Campbell, 1st Baron Glenavy
1907–1908 Mr. Justice Kenny
1908–1909 Charles L. Matheson, KC
1909–1910 Mr. Justice White
1910–1911 Charles Andrew O'Connor, KC, Solicitor General for Ireland
1911–1912 Mr. Justice Dunbar Barton
1912–1913 John Gordon, KC
1913–1914 Mr. Justice William E. Wylie
1914–1915 Sir Denis Henry, 1st Baronet, later first Lord Chief Justice of Northern Ireland
1915–1916 Gerald Fitzgerald
1916–1917 Arthur Samuels, KC
1917–1918 Thomas Lopdell O'Shaughnessy (Last Recorder of Dublin)
1918–1919 Godfrey Fetherstonhaugh, KC
1919–1920 Sir William Moore, 1st Baronet, later Lord Chief Justice of Northern Ireland
1920–1921 Robert F. Harrison
1921–1922 Mr. Justice John Blake Powell
1922–1923 William Jellett, KC, MP
1923–1924 Thomas Francis Molony, LCJ (Last Lord Chief Justice of Ireland)
1924–1925 Samuel L. Brown, KC
1925–1926 Mr. Justice Gerald Fitzgibbon
1926–1927 Alexander F. Blood, KC
1927–1928 Mr. Justice Henry Hanna
1928–1929 Garrett William Walker
1929–1930 Mr. Justice William E. Wylie
1930–1931 Hewitt R. Poole
1931–1932 Mr. Justice Timothy Sullivan (First President of the High Court)
1932–1933 Frederick W. Price
1933–1934 Frederick W. Price
1934–1935 Mr. Justice James Creed Meredith
1935–1936 Ernest J. Phelps, SC
1936–1937 Mr. Justice Johnson
1937–1938 Frederick F. Denning
1938–1939 Mr. Justice James Murnaghan
1939–1940 Andrew Kingsbury Overend, KC
1940–1941 Mr. Justice John O'Byrne
1941–1942 Thomas S. McCann
1942–1943 Conor Alexander Maguire (Second President of the High Court)
1943–1944 Patrick Lynch, KC
1944–1945 Mr Justice James Geoghegan
1945–1946 J. M. Fitzgerald, SC
1946–1947 Mr. Justice Cahir Davitt
1947–1948 John Aloysius Costello
1948–1949 Mr. Justice George Gavan Duffy (Third President of the High Court)
1949–1950 R. G. L. Leonard, KC
1950–1951 Mr. Justice George William Shannon (First President of the Circuit Court)
1951–1952 Vincent Rice, SC
1952–1953 Mr. Justice Cecil Lavery
1953–1954 Frank Fitzgibbon, QC
1954–1955 Mr. Justice Martin C. Maguire
1955–1956 Mr. Carson
1956–1957 Mr Justice Kevin Haugh
1957–1958 P. McCarthy
1958–1959 Mr. Justice T.C. Kingsmill Moore
1959–1960 Henry J. Molony
1960–1961 Mr. Justice Carroll O'Daly
1961–1962 Richard McGonigal, SC
1962–1963 Mr. Justice Gardner Budd
1963–1964 Thomas F. Bacon
1964–1965 Mr. Justice George D. Murnaghan
1965–1966 Mr Campbell
1966–1967 Mr. Justice Richard McLoughlin
1967–1968 Denis Pringle
1968–1969 Mr. Justice William FitzGerald
1969–1970 G. Micks
1970–1971 Mr. Justice Thomas Teevan
1971–1972 T. K. Liston, SC
1972–1973 Mr. Justice Aindrias Ó Caoimh (Fifth President of the High Court)
1973–1974 Thomas B. Hannin
1974–1975 Mr. Justice Brian Walsh
1975–1976 Ernest M. Wood
1976–1977 Mr. Justice John Kenny
1977–1978 Oliver D. Gogarty, SC
1978–1979 Mr. Justice Séamus Henchy
1979–1980 Thomas Vincent Davy, SC (The last officeholder to hold the position as Treasurer)

The library collection dates from the end of the 18th century (when it also adopted its motto 'Nolumus mutari'), and was based in part on that of Christopher Robinson, senior puisne judge of the Court of King's Bench (Ireland), who died in 1787.

The books were sold at auction at Sotheby's, London, and a considerable stock of them was sold to clients outside Ireland. This was seen at the time as a major cultural outflow, as many of the books were of historical and cultural significance. In addition, its library had received an annual grant since 1945 for the upkeep of the books from the Irish Exchequer.

== Profile ==
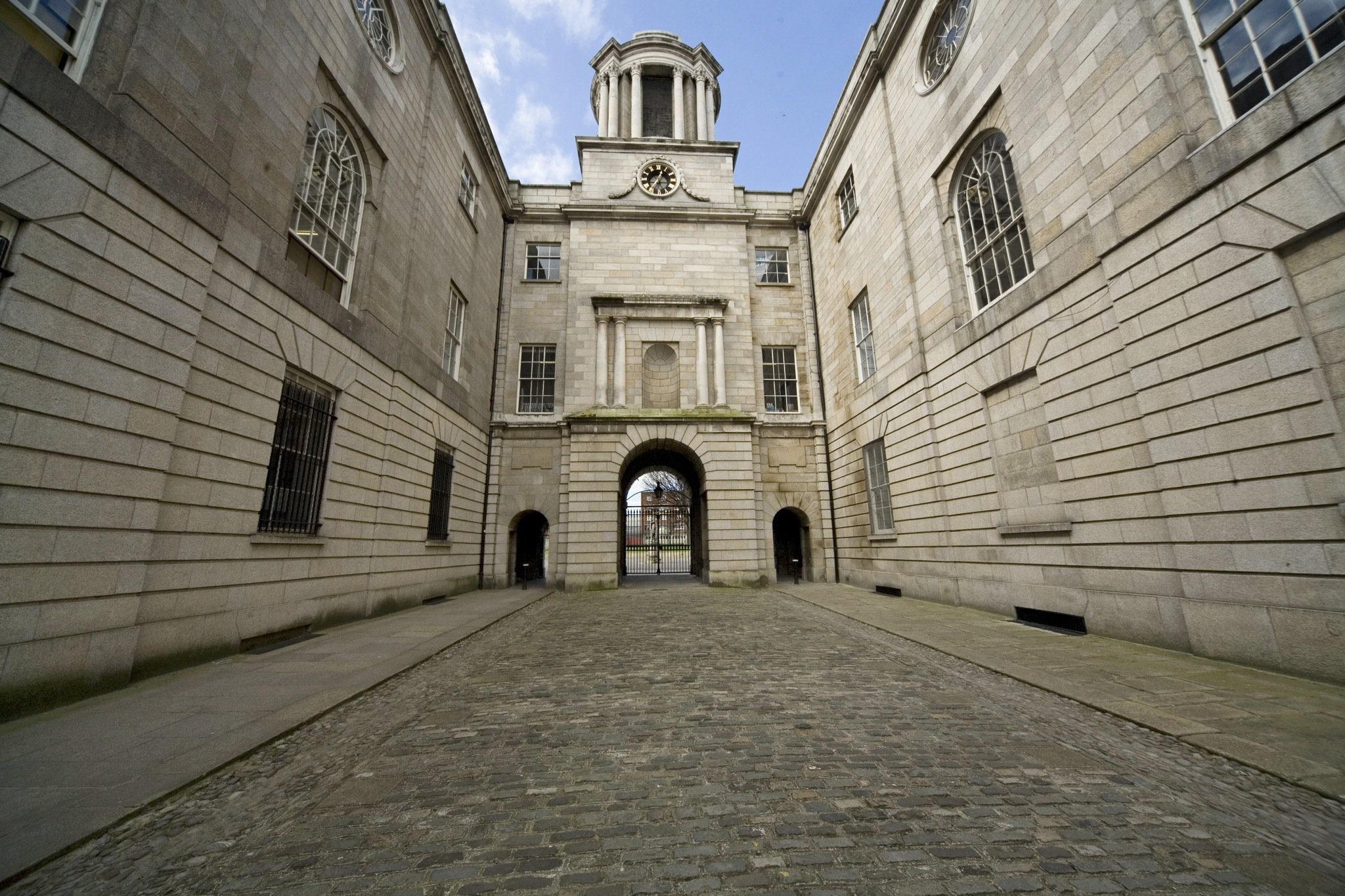
King's Inns courtyard on Henrietta Street

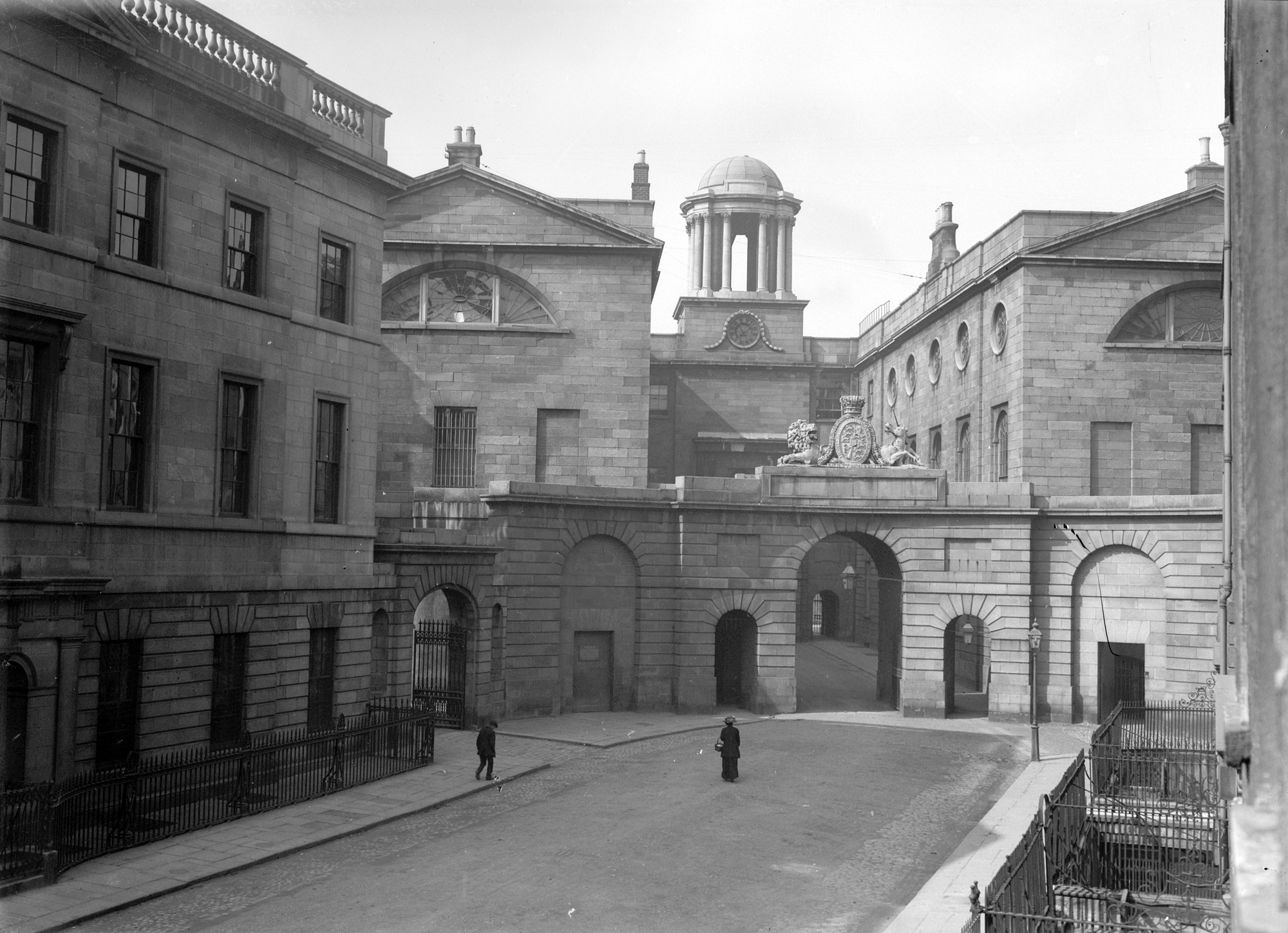
King's Inns courtyard at the turn of the 20th century

The society has generally kept a low profile in current affairs in Ireland.

A King's Inns team or individual has often won the Irish Times National Debating Championship, and in 2010 won the European Universities Debating Championships. In 2006 the Inns' hurling team competed in and won the Fergal Maher Cup (3rd Level Division 3) in their inaugural year and subsequently reached the final and semi-final.

The Hungry Tree, a London Plane that encapsulates a park bench, lies in the grounds of the King's Inns, near the south gate.

== Architecture and facilities ==
The King's Inns complex, situated near Henrietta Street in Dublin, is considered a significant example of neo-classical architecture. It is often cited as an integral part of Dublin's architectural heritage.

=== Initial design and construction ===
The complex was initially designed by architect James Gandon, who was well known for his work on the Custom House and Four Courts. Construction began in 1800, with the first stone laid by Lord Chancellor John FitzGibbon, Earl of Clare on 1 August of that year. Gandon's original design featured two parallel buildings connected by a narrow bridge-like structure at the west front. This structure had three openings and was crowned by a cupola—a domed structure supported by columns.

Due to various delays and funding issues, Gandon resigned from the project in 1808. His assistant, Henry A. Baker, took over and completed the project by 1816.

=== Extensions and modifications ===
The complex underwent extensions in the mid-19th century. Architect Frederick Darley added three bays to the north end in 1846, while Jacob Owen extended the south end by three bays in 1849. These extensions were designed to include fireproof strong rooms for storing records, toilets, a carpenters' shop, and a bookbinder.

=== Architectural features ===
The King's Inns complex is notable for its use of Portland stone caryatids, which symbolise themes like Plenty, Bacchante, Security, and Law. The building also features a copper dome, a design element that Gandon popularised in Dublin.

=== Reception, renovations, and conservation ===
The architecture of King's Inns has been the subject of various opinions. Some consider its gable end to be in the style of Louis Sullivan, a renowned architect known for his work in Chicago.

In 1998, a major refurbishment project was carried out in the Registry of Deeds. This renovation included updates to the entrance lobby and conservation work on the staircase, windows, and roof.

== Notable alumni and academics ==
See also: Category:Irish barristers

- Henry Grattan
- Bartholomew Thomas Duhigg
- Theobald Wolfe Tone
- Daniel O'Connell
- Christopher Palles
- Edward Carson
- John Redmond
- Patrick Pearse
- John A. Costello
- Averil Deverell
- Frances Kyle
- V. V. Giri
- Jack Lynch
- Liam Cosgrave
- Charles Haughey
- Mella Carroll
- Catherine McGuinness
- Mary Robinson
- Mary Laffoy
- Susan Denham
- John Bruton
- Mary Irvine

== See also ==
- Northern Ireland Inn of Court
- Inns Of Court
- 18th-century Western domes
