= Tamworth Manifesto =

British political manifesto issued by Robert Peel

The Tamworth Manifesto was a political manifesto issued by Sir Robert Peel in December 1834 to the voters of Tamworth prior to the 1835 United Kingdom general election. It begins with "I accept defeat"; it is widely credited by historians as having laid down the principles upon which the modern British Conservative Party is based.

In November 1834, King William IV removed the Whig Prime Minister Lord Melbourne and asked the Duke of Wellington, a Tory, to form a ministry. Wellington was reluctant; he formed a caretaker government but recommended that the king choose Peel, who was abroad. After Peel took over in December, an election was called. Perhaps owing to Wellington's endorsement, Peel intended from the start, as the historian S. J. Lee tells, "to fully convince the country and electorate that there was a substantial difference between his brand of conservatism and that of his predecessor and 'old tory' Wellington."

With that in mind, on 18 December the Tamworth Manifesto was published by the press and read around the country. Like many other manifestos in nineteenth-century British politics it was formally an address to the electors of the leader's own constituency, but reproduced widely. In the event Tamworth was uncontested in 1835: Peel and his brother William were the only candidates – they were elected, i.e. "returned", unopposed. Nationally, Peel's party made gains, but the Whigs retained an overall majority and Melbourne returned to power in April.

== Peel's aims dictated in the Tamworth Manifesto ==
The main aim of the manifesto was to appeal to the electorate in the new Parliament.

- Peel accepted that the Reform Act 1832 was "a final and irrevocable settlement of a great constitutional question".
- He promised that the Conservatives would undertake a "careful review of institutions, civil and ecclesiastical".
- Where there was a case for change, he promised "the correction of proved abuses and the redress of real grievances".
- Peel offered to look at the question of church reform in order to preserve the "true interests of the Established religion".
- Peel's basic message, therefore, was that the Conservatives "would reform to survive".
- However, he opposed what he saw as unnecessary change, fearing "a perpetual vortex of agitation".

== See also ==
- Antidisestablishmentarianism
- Roman Catholic Relief Act 1829
- High Church
- High Tory
