= Second Melbourne ministry =

Government of the United Kingdom

- 1835–1841
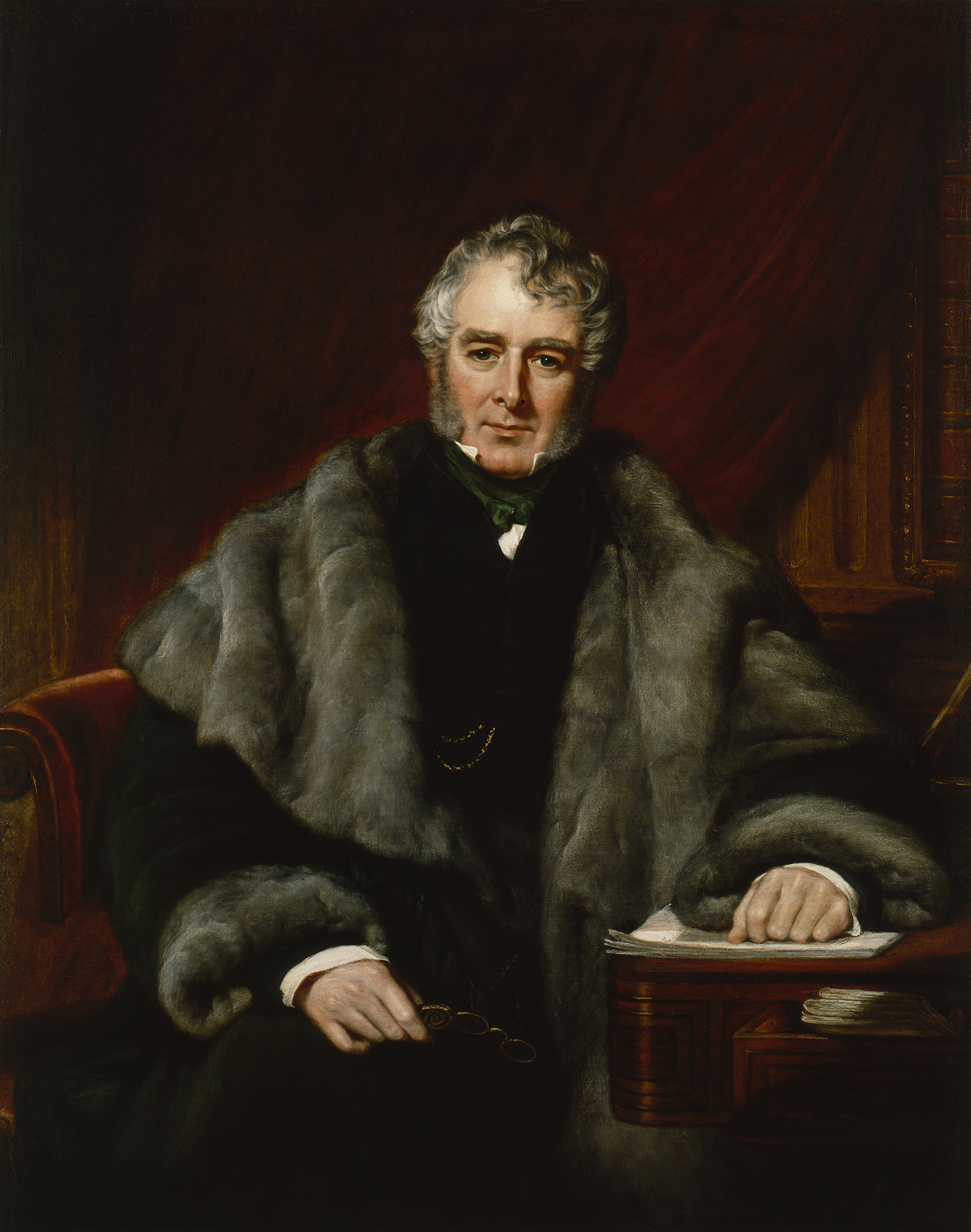
- Portrait of Lord Melbourne by John Partridge
- Date formed: 8 April 1835
- Date dissolved: 30 August 1841

People and organisations
- Monarch: William IV; Victoria
- Prime Minister: William Lamb, 2nd Viscount Melbourne

History
- Election: 1835 general election
- Outgoing election: 1841 general election
- Predecessor: First Peel ministry
- Successor: Second Peel ministry

The second Lord Melbourne ministry was formed in the United Kingdom of Great Britain and Ireland by the William Lamb, 2nd Viscount Melbourne in 1835.

== History ==
Lord Melbourne's second government came to power after Sir Robert Peel's minority government resigned in 1835. Henry John Temple, 3rd Viscount Palmerston returned as Foreign Secretary while Lord John Russell held his first major office as Home Secretary.

In 1837 Queen Victoria succeeded to the throne, and as was usual for a queen regnant, the Royal Household was appointed by the prime minister. The young queen was so attached to her Whig ladies of the bedchamber that after Melbourne's resignation in 1839, she refused to let Sir Robert Peel replace them with Conservative ladies. This was known as the Bedchamber Crisis, and led to Peel's refusal to form a government. Melbourne therefore resumed, and continued in office until the Conservatives finally won a House of Commons majority in the General Election of 1841. He was succeeded by Sir Robert Peel's second government.

== 1841 votes of no confidence ==
The 1841 votes of no confidence against the government of Viscount Melbourne were votes of no confidence in the government of William Lamb, 2nd Viscount Melbourne which occurred on 7 June 1841. Melbourne lost the vote by only one vote and dissolved Parliament leading to an election in July 1841. Melbourne lost a second vote of confidence shortly after the election in August, leading to his resignation.

== Cabinets ==
=== April 1835 – August 1839 ===
| Office | Name | Term |
|---|---|---|
| First Lord of the Treasury | William Lamb, 2nd Viscount Melbourne | April 1835 – August 1839 |
| Lord Chancellor | In Commission | April 1835 – January 1836 |
| Lord Chancellor | Charles Pepys, 1st Baron Cottenham | January 1836 – August 1839 |
| Lord President of the Council | Henry Petty-Fitzmaurice, 3rd Marquess of Lansdowne | April 1835 – August 1839 |
| Lord Privy Seal | John Ponsonby, Viscount Duncannon | April 1835 – August 1839 |
| Home Secretary | Lord John Russell | April 1835 – August 1839 |
| Foreign Secretary | Henry John Temple, 3rd Viscount Palmerston | April 1835 – August 1839 |
| Secretary of State for War and the Colonies | Charles Grant, 1st Baron Glenelg | April 1835 – February 1839 |
| Secretary of State for War and the Colonies | Constantine Henry Phipps, 1st Marquess of Normanby | February–August 1839 |
| First Lord of the Admiralty | George Eden, 2nd Baron Auckland | April–September 1835 |
| First Lord of the Admiralty | Gilbert Elliot-Murray-Kynynmound, 2nd Earl of Minto | September 1835 – August 1839 |
| Chancellor of the Exchequer | Thomas Spring Rice | April 1835 – August 1839 |
| President of the Board of Trade | Charles Poulett Thomson | April 1835 – August 1839 |
| President of the Board of Control | Sir John Cam Hobhouse | April 1835 – August 1839 |
| First Commissioner of Woods and Forests | John Ponsonby, Viscount Duncannon | April 1835 – August 1839 |
| Chancellor of the Duchy of Lancaster | Henry Richard Vassall-Fox, 3rd Baron Holland | April 1835 – August 1839 |
| Secretary at War | Henry Grey, Viscount Howick | April 1835 – August 1839 |

==== Notes ====
- Viscount Duncannon served concurrently as Lord Privy Seal and First Commissioner of Woods and Forests.

=== August 1839 – September 1841 ===
| Office | Name | Term |
|---|---|---|
| First Lord of the Treasury; Leader of the House of Lords | William Lamb, 2nd Viscount Melbourne | August 1839 – September 1841 |
| Lord Chancellor | Charles Pepys, 1st Baron Cottenham | August 1839 – September 1841 |
| Lord President of the Council | Henry Petty-Fitzmaurice, 3rd Marquess of Lansdowne | August 1839 – September 1841 |
| Lord Privy Seal | John Ponsonby, Viscount Duncannon | August 1839 – January 1840 |
| Lord Privy Seal | George Villiers, 4th Earl of Clarendon | January 1840 – September 1841 |
| Home Secretary | Constantine Henry Phipps, 1st Marquess of Normanby | August 1839 – September 1841 |
| Foreign Secretary | Henry John Temple, 3rd Viscount Palmerston | August 1839 – September 1841 |
| Secretary of State for War and the Colonies; Leader of the House of Commons | Lord John Russell | August 1839 – September 1841 |
| First Lord of the Admiralty | Gilbert Elliot-Murray-Kynynmound, 2nd Earl of Minto | August 1839 – September 1841 |
| Chancellor of the Exchequer | Francis Thornhill Baring | August 1839 – September 1841 |
| President of the Board of Trade | Henry Labouchere | August 1839 – September 1841 |
| President of the Board of Control | Sir John Cam Hobhouse | August 1839 – September 1841 |
| First Commissioner of Woods and Forests | John Ponsonby, Viscount Duncannon | August 1839 – September 1841 |
| Chancellor of the Duchy of Lancaster | Henry Richard Vassall-Fox, 3rd Baron Holland | August 1839 – October 1840 |
| Chancellor of the Duchy of Lancaster | George Villiers, 4th Earl of Clarendon | October 1840 – June 1841 |
| Chancellor of the Duchy of Lancaster | Sir George Grey, 2nd Baronet | June–September 1841 |
| Secretary at War | Thomas Babington Macaulay | August 1839 – September 1841 |
| Chief Secretary for Ireland | George Howard, Viscount Morpeth | August 1839 – September 1841 |

==== Notes ====
- Viscount Duncannon served concurrently as Lord Privy Seal and First Commissioner of Woods and Forests between August 1839 and January 1840.
- Lord Clarendon served concurrently as Lord Privy Seal and Chancellor of the Duchy of Lancaster between October 1840 and June 1841.

== List of ministers ==
Members of the Cabinet are indicated by bold face.

| Office | Name | Date |
|---|---|---|
| Prime Minister First Lord of the Treasury Leader of the House of Lords | William Lamb, 2nd Viscount Melbourne | 18 April 1835 – 30 August 1841 (Note: The Government resigned on 7 May 1839 following a defeat in Parliament. Queen Victoria invited Sir Robert Peel to form a government, who declined. Melbourne resumed in office from 10 May 1839.) |
| Chancellor of the Exchequer | Thomas Spring Rice | 18 April 1835 |
| Chancellor of the Exchequer | Francis Baring | 26 August 1839 |
| Parliamentary Secretary to the Treasury | Edward Stanley | 21 April 1835 |
| Parliamentary Secretary to the Treasury | ir Denis Le Marchant | 19 June 1841 |
| Financial Secretary to the Treasury | Francis Baring | 21 April 1835 |
| Financial Secretary to the Treasury | Robert Gordon | 6 September 1839 |
| Financial Secretary to the Treasury | Richard More O'Ferrall | 9 June 1841 |
| Junior Lords of the Treasury | Edward Seymour, Baron Seymour | 18 April 1835 – 2 November 1839 |
| Junior Lords of the Treasury | William Ord | 18 April 1835 – 18 July 1837 |
| Junior Lords of the Treasury | Robert Steuart | 18 April 1835 – 26 May 1840 |
| Junior Lords of the Treasury | Richard More O'Ferrall | 16 May 1835 – 28 August 1839 |
| Junior Lords of the Treasury | John Parker | 18 July 1837 – 23 June 1841 |
| Junior Lords of the Treasury | Thomas Wyse | 28 August 1839 – 30 August 1841 |
| Junior Lords of the Treasury | Henry Tufnell | 2 November 1839 – 30 August 1841 |
| Junior Lords of the Treasury | Edward Horsman | 26 May 1840 – 30 August 1841 |
| Junior Lords of the Treasury | William Cowper | 23 June 1841 – 30 August 1841 |
| Lord Chancellor | in commission | 23 April 1835 |
| Lord Chancellor | Charles Pepeys, 1st Baron Cottenham | 16 January 1836 |
| Lord President of the Council | Henry Petty-FitzMaurice, 3rd Marquess of Lansdowne | 23 April 1835 |
| Lord Privy Seal | John Ponsonby, Viscount Duncannon | 23 April 1835 |
| Lord Privy Seal | George Villiers, 4th Earl of Clarendon | 15 January 1840 |
| Secretary of State for the Home Department | Lord John Russell (Note: Also Leader of the House of Commons.) | 18 April 1835 |
| Secretary of State for the Home Department | Constantine Phipps, 1st Marquess of Normanby | 30 August 1839 |
| Under-Secretary of State for the Home Department | Fox Maule | 18 April 1835 |
| Under-Secretary of State for the Home Department | Edward Seymour, Baron Seymour | 15 June 1841 |
| Secretary of State for Foreign Affairs | Henry John Temple, 3rd Viscount Palmerston | 18 April 1835 |
| Under-Secretary of State for Foreign Affairs | William Fox-Strangways | 18 April 1835 |
| Under-Secretary of State for Foreign Affairs | Granville Leveson-Gower, Viscount Leveson | 7 March 1840 |
| Secretary of State for War and the Colonies | Charles Grant (Note: Created Baron Glenelg 8 May 1835.) | 18 April 1835 |
| Secretary of State for War and the Colonies | Constantine Phipps, 1st Marquess of Normanby | 20 February 1839 |
| Secretary of State for War and the Colonies | Lord John Russell (Note: Also Leader of the House of Commons.) | 30 August 1839 |
| Under-Secretary of State for War and the Colonies | Sir George Grey, 2nd Baronet | 18 April 1835 |
| Under-Secretary of State for War and the Colonies | Henry Labouchere | 28 February 1839 |
| Under-Secretary of State for War and the Colonies | Robert Vernon Smith | 31 August 1839 |
| First Lord of the Admiralty | George Eden, 2nd Baron Auckland | 22 April 1835 |
| First Lord of the Admiralty | Gilbert Elliot-Murray-Kynynmound, 2nd Earl of Minto | 15 September 1835 |
| First Secretary of the Admiralty | Charles Wood | 27 April 1835 |
| First Secretary of the Admiralty | Richard More O'Ferrall | 4 October 1839 |
| First Secretary of the Admiralty | John Parker | 9 June 1841 |
| Civil Lord of the Admiralty | Archibald Primrose, Lord Dalmeny | 23 April 1835 |
| President of the Board of Control | Sir John Hobhouse | 23 April 1835 |
| Joint Secretaries of the Board of Control | Robert Gordon | 21 April 1835 – 30 September 1839 |
| Joint Secretaries of the Board of Control | Robert Vernon Smith | 21 April 1835 – 30 September 1839 |
| Joint Secretaries of the Board of Control | Edward Seymour, Baron Seymour | 30 September 1839 – 15 June 1841 |
| Joint Secretaries of the Board of Control | William Clay | 30 September 1839 – 30 August 1841 |
| Joint Secretaries of the Board of Control | Charles Buller | 21 June 1841 – 30 August 1841 |
| Chief Secretary for Ireland | George Howard, Viscount Morpeth (Note: Entered the Cabinet 20 February 1839.) | 22 April 1835 |
| Lord Lieutenant of Ireland | Constantine Phipps, 2nd Earl of Mulgrave | 29 April 1835 |
| Lord Lieutenant of Ireland | Hugh Fortescue, Viscount Ebrington | 13 March 1839 |
| Chancellor of the Duchy of Lancaster | Henry Richard Vassall-Fox, 3rd Baron Holland | 20 February 1835 |
| Chancellor of the Duchy of Lancaster | George Villiers, 4th Earl of Clarendon | 31 October 1840 |
| Chancellor of the Duchy of Lancaster | Sir George Grey, 2nd Baronet | 23 June 1841 |
| President of the Board of Trade | Charles Poulett Thomson | 18 April 1835 |
| President of the Board of Trade | Henry Labouchere | 29 August 1839 |
| Vice-President of the Board of Trade | Henry Labouchere | 6 May 1835 |
| Vice-President of the Board of Trade | Richard Lalor Sheil | 29 August 1839 |
| Vice-President of the Board of Trade | Fox Maule | 28 June 1841 |
| Secretary at War | Henry Grey, Viscount Howick | 18 April 1835 |
| Secretary at War | Thomas Babington Macaulay | 27 September 1839 |
| First Commissioner of Woods and Forests | John Ponsonby, Viscount Duncannon | 28 April 1835 |
| Master of the Mint | Henry Labouchere | 25 April 1835 |
| Treasurer of the Navy (Note: Office merged to become Paymaster-General 1 December 1836.) | Sir Henry Parnell | 20 April 1835 |
| Master-General of the Ordnance | Sir Hussey Vivian (Note: Created Baron Vivian 19 August 1841.) | 4 May 1835 |
| Treasurer of the Ordnance | Sir Henry Parnell | 9 May 1835 |
| Surveyor-General of the Ordnance | Sir Rufane Shaw Donkin | 20 April 1835 |
| Surveyor-General of the Ordnance | Charles Richard Fox | 5 May 1841 |
| Clerk of the Ordnance | Andrew Leith Hay | 20 April 1835 |
| Clerk of the Ordnance | James Whitley Deans Dundas | 21 March 1838 |
| Clerk of the Ordnance | George Anson | 23 June 1841 |
| Storekeeper of the Ordnance | George Anson | 25 April 1835 |
| Storekeeper of the Ordnance | James Hanway Plumridge | 23 June 1841 |
| Paymaster of the Forces | Sir Henry Parnell | 28 April 1835 |
| Paymaster General | Sir Henry Parnell | 27 April 1835 |
| Paymaster General | Edward Stanley | 19 June 1841 |
| Postmaster-General | Francis Conyngham, 2nd Marquess Conyngham | 30 April 1835 |
| Postmaster-General | Thomas Anson, 1st Earl of Lichfield | 22 May 1835 |
| Attorney General | Sir John Campbell | 30 April 1835 |
| Attorney General | Sir Thomas Wilde | 3 July 1841 |
| Solicitor General | Sir Robert Rolfe | 4 May 1835 |
| Solicitor General | Sir Thomas Wilde | 2 December 1839 |
| Judge Advocate General | Robert Cutlar Fergusson | 20 April 1835 |
| Judge Advocate General | William St Julien Arabin | 24 November 1838 |
| Judge Advocate General | Sir George Grey, 2nd Baronet | 15 February 1839 |
| Judge Advocate General | Richard Lalor Sheil | 23 June 1841 |
| Lord Advocate | John Murray | 20 April 1835 |
| Lord Advocate | Andrew Rutherfurd | 20 April 1839 |
| Solicitor General for Scotland | John Cunninghame | 22 April 1835 |
| Solicitor General for Scotland | Andrew Rutherfurd | 9 February 1837 |
| Solicitor General for Scotland | James Ivory | 20 April 1839 |
| Solicitor General for Scotland | Thomas Maitland | 9 May 1840 |
| Attorney General for Ireland | Louis Perrin | 29 April 1835 |
| Attorney General for Ireland | Michael O'Loghlen | 31 August 1835 |
| Attorney General for Ireland | John Richards | 10 November 1836 |
| Attorney General for Ireland | Stephen Woulfe | 3 February 1837 |
| Attorney General for Ireland | Nicholas Ball | 11 July 1838 |
| Attorney General for Ireland | Maziere Brady | 23 February 1839 |
| Attorney General for Ireland | David Richard Pigot | 11 August 1840 |
| Solicitor General for Ireland | Michael O'Loghlen | 29 April 1835 |
| Solicitor General for Ireland | John Richards | 21 September 1835 |
| Solicitor General for Ireland | Stephen Woulfe | 10 November 1836 |
| Solicitor General for Ireland | Maziere Brady | 3 February 1837 |
| Solicitor General for Ireland | David Richard Pigot | 11 February 1839 |
| Solicitor General for Ireland | Richard Moore | 14 August 1840 |
| Lord Steward of the Household | George Campbell, 6th Duke of Argyll | 23 April 1835 |
| Lord Steward of the Household | William Hay, 18th Earl of Erroll | 21 November 1839 |
| Lord Chamberlain of the Household | Richard Wellesley, 1st Marquess Wellesley | 23 April 1835 |
| Lord Chamberlain of the Household | Francis Conyngham, 2nd Marquess Conyngham | 22 May 1835 |
| Lord Chamberlain of the Household | Henry Paget, Earl of Uxbridge | 6 May 1839 |
| Vice-Chamberlain of the Household | Lord Charles FitzRoy | 29 June 1835 |
| Vice-Chamberlain of the Household | George Chichester, Earl of Belfast | 27 April 1838 |
| Master of the Horse | William Keppel, 4th Earl of Albemarle | 25 April 1835 |
| Treasurer of the Household | Sir William Henry Fremantle | 27 May 1826 – Continued in office |
| Treasurer of the Household | Henry Fitzalan-Howard, Earl of Surrey | 17 July 1837 |
| Treasurer of the Household | George Byng | 23 June 1841 |
| Comptroller of the Household | George Byng | 6 May 1835 |
| Comptroller of the Household | Lord Marcus Hill | 23 June 1841 |
| Captain of the Gentlemen-at-Arms | Thomas Foley, 4th Baron Foley | 6 May 1835 |
| Captain of the Yeomen of the Guard | Archibald Acheson, 2nd Earl of Gosford | 23 April 1835 |
| Captain of the Yeomen of the Guard | Henry Fox-Strangways, 3rd Earl of Ilchester | 5 August 1835 |
| Captain of the Yeomen of the Guard | Henry Fitzalan-Howard, Earl of Surrey | 6 July 1841 |
| Master of the Buckhounds | William Hay, 18th Earl of Erroll | 30 April 1835 |
| Master of the Buckhounds | George Kinnaird, 9th Lord Kinnaird | 21 December 1839 |
| Mistress of the Robes | Harriet Sutherland-Leveson-Gower, Duchess of Sutherland | 29 August 1837 |
| Lords in Waiting | Thomas Taylour, 2nd Marquess of Headfort | 17 July 1837 – 30 August 1841 |
| Lords in Waiting | John Douglas, 7th Marquess of Queensberry | 17 July 1837 – 30 August 1841 |
| Lords in Waiting | Lucius Cary, 10th Viscount Falkland | 17 July 1837 – 4 February 1840 |
| Lords in Waiting | George Byng, 7th Viscount Torrington | 17 July 1837 – 30 August 1841 |
| Lords in Waiting | George Byron, 7th Baron Byron (Note: Permanent.) | 17 July 1837 – 31 March 1860 |
| Lords in Waiting | Alan Gardner, 3rd Baron Gardner | 17 July 1837 – 1 July 1840 |
| Lords in Waiting | Thomas Powys, 3rd Baron Lilford | 17 July 1837 – 30 August 1841 |
| Lords in Waiting | Arthur Chichester, 1st Baron Templemore | 17 July 1837 – 26 September 1837 |
| Lords in Waiting | Henry Paget, Earl of Uxbridge | 11 October 1837 – 6 May 1839 |
| Lords in Waiting | Arthur Plunkett, 9th Earl of Fingall | 11 December 1837 – 30 August 1841 |
| Lords in Waiting | William Hare, 2nd Earl of Listowel | 4 February 1840 – 30 August 1841 |
| Lords in Waiting | Charles Gordon, Earl of Aboyne | 1 July 1840 – 30 August 1841 |

Notes

| Preceded by First Peel ministry | Government of the United Kingdom; 1835–1841 | Succeeded by Second Peel ministry |
