= Melbourne ministry =

Melbourne ministry may refer to:

- First Melbourne ministry, the British government led by Lord Melbourne from July to November 1834
- Second Melbourne ministry, the British government led by Lord Melbourne from 1835 to 1841
