= Attorney General O'Loghlen =

Attorney General O'Loghlen may refer to:

- Bryan O'Loghlen (1828–1905), Attorney General of Victoria
- Michael O'Loghlen (1789–1842), Attorney General for Ireland
