= Wellington ministry =

Wellington ministry may refer to:

- Wellington–Peel ministry, the British government led by the Duke of Wellington from 1828 to 1830
- Wellington caretaker ministry, the British government led by the Duke of Wellington from November to December 1834
