= John George Gibson =

Irish lawyer, judge and Conservative politician

John George Gibson PC, QC (13 February 1846 – 28 June 1923), was an Irish lawyer, judge and Conservative politician.

== Background and education ==
Gibson was the youngest son of William Gibson of Merrion Square, Dublin, and Rockforest, County Tipperary, and his first wife Louisa Grant, daughter of Joseph Grant, barrister, of Dublin. Edward Gibson, 1st Baron Ashbourne, was his elder brother. He was educated at Trinity College Dublin and was called to the bar at the King's Inns, Dublin in 1870.

== Legal career ==
Gibson was made an Irish Queen's Counsel in 1880, and Third Irish Serjeant in 1885. In 1885 he was elected Member of Parliament for Liverpool Walton. He was Solicitor General for Ireland from November 1885 to January 1886 and Attorney-General for Ireland from 1887 to 1888. He resigned his seat in 1888 to become an Irish High Court Judge.

Maurice Healy in his memoir The Old Munster Circuit praises Gibson's charm, eloquence, dignity and sense of fairness, although he rated him below his brother Lord Ashbourne as a lawyer. Arguably Healy underestimated Gibson as a judge: his judgment in Fox v. Higgins remains the definitive analysis of the curious "triangular" employment situation in Ireland involving an individual teacher, the school board and the Minister for Education, and it is still regularly quoted.

== Family ==
In 1871, Gibson married his cousin, Ann Sophia Matilda Hare, daughter of Reverend John Hare of Deer Park, County Tipperary and Mary Pennefather, and had eight children, of whom only four - John, William, Anne, and Charlotte - survived infancy. Anne died in 1911, aged only 34. Maurice Healy in The Old Munster Circuit records the touching story of how her father, despite his desperate concern about Anne's serious illness, tried to hold the Cork assizes in the normal way: but the members of the Irish Bar, out of compassion, found excuses to adjourn all the cases in the legal calendar. Gibson, a man of strong emotions, was so moved by this kindness that he burst into tears.

He lived at 38 Fitzwilliam Place, Dublin. His elder brother Edward Gibson became Baron Ashbourne and Lord Chancellor of Ireland. Gibson died at the age of 77. His widow died in 1939.

Parliament of the United Kingdom
| New constituency | Member of Parliament for Liverpool Walton; 1885 – 1888 | Succeeded by Miles Walker Mattinson |
Legal offices
| Preceded by John Monroe | Solicitor-General for Ireland; 1885–1886 | Succeeded by Hugh Hyacinth O'Rorke MacDermot |
| Preceded by Hugh Hyacinth O'Rorke MacDermot | Solicitor-General for Ireland; 1886–1887 | Succeeded by Peter O'Brien |
| Preceded by Hugh Holmes | Attorney-General for Ireland; 1887 | Succeeded by Peter O'Brien |
