= John Monroe (lawyer) =

Irish lawyer and judge (1839–1899)

John Monroe PC QC

Solicitor-General for Ireland
- In office July 1885 – November 1885
- Monarch: Victoria
- Preceded by: Hugh Hyacinth O'Rorke MacDermot
- Succeeded by: John George Gibson

Personal details
- Born: 1839 Moira, County Down, Ireland
- Died: September 1899 (aged 59–60) Dalkey, County Dublin, Ireland
- Spouse: Elizabeth Moule (m. 1867)
- Children: Walter S. Monroe
- Relatives: Moses Monroe (brother); Hugh Holmes (brother-in-law); Frederick C. Alderdice (nephew)
- Education: Queens College Galway; King's Inns
- Occupation: Lawyer

John Monroe PC, QC (1839 – September 1899), was an Irish lawyer and judge.

== Background and education ==
Monroe was born at Moira, County Down, eldest son of John Monroe senior and Jane Harvey. He was educated at Queens College Galway, where he was auditor of the college's Literary and Debating Society for two years, from 1860 to 1862, and at the King's Inns, where he was auditor of the Law Students' Debating Society of Ireland for the 1862–1863 session.

== Legal career ==
Monroe was called to the Irish Bar in 1863; he took silk in 1877 and became a Bencher of the King's Inns in 1884. For a short period (1879 to 1880) he was Law Adviser to the Lord Lieutenant of Ireland. He was appointed Solicitor-General for Ireland in June 1885 but relinquished the post in November upon his appointment to a judgeship of the Landed Estates Court. Failing health caused him to resign this post in 1893. He was appointed to the Irish Privy Council in 1886. He had a good reputation in the legal field and was regarded as an expert on the Irish Land situation.

== Personal life ==
Monroe died at Dalkey, County Dublin, in September 1899. He married Elizabeth Moule, daughter of John Watkins Moule and Jane Harvie, of the prominent Moule family of Elmley Lovett, Worcestershire, in 1867, and had seven children. Their eldest son, Walter Stanley Monroe, later became Prime Minister of Newfoundland. A younger son, Horace, became a clergyman attached to St. Patrick's Cathedral, Dublin , and wrote a short history of his mother's family. The Moule marriage created a family tie with one of Ireland's foremost judges, Hugh Holmes, who married Elizabeth's sister Olivia.

Legal offices
Preceded by Hugh Hyacinth O'Rorke MacDermot	Solicitor-General for Ireland; July–November 1885	Succeeded by John George Gibson
