= John Doherty (Irish politician) =

Irish politician and judge

John Doherty, Q.C. (1785–1850) was an Irish politician, Solicitor-General for Ireland and senior judge, who became Chief Justice of the Irish Common Pleas.

== Background and education ==
Doherty was born in Dublin, the second surviving son of John Doherty and his wife Margaret Verney. His father, an attorney, died before 1803. He was educated at Chester School and Trinity College Dublin, entered the King's Inns, and was called to the Bar 1808. He had a family connection through his father with the leading statesman George Canning, which was useful to him in his career. Doherty's father's mother (so his grandmother) was Abigail Canning, the sister of George Canning's grandfather.

== Legal and judicial career ==
Doherty was made a King's Counsel in 1823 (becoming a Queen's Counsel with the accession of Queen Victoria to the Throne in 1837). He was Member of Parliament for New Ross, Kilkenny City and Newport (Cornwall) and served as Solicitor-General for Ireland from 1827 to 1830. He was a Bencher of the King's Inns. In 1830 he was appointed Chief Justice of the Irish Common Pleas, in which office he remained until his death from heart disease in 1850. As a judge, he was described as courteous and painstaking, but not deeply learned.

As Solicitor-General he is remembered mainly for prosecuting the 'Doneraile Conspiracy' case in 1829, and for his ferocious clashes with Daniel O'Connell, who appeared as defence counsel for several of the accused and secured their acquittals. O'Connell attacked both Doherty's tactics and his integrity, openly accusing him of conniving in the conviction of innocent men: he repeated the attacks in Parliament where Doherty successfully defended his conduct. The enmity between the two men lasted till death.

== Reputation ==
While O'Connell had a very poor opinion of Doherty (as he did of many of the Irish judges at the time, notably Thomas Lefroy), and treated his appointment as Chief Justice as a personal insult, most of his colleagues on the Bench admired Doherty's legal ability (though not a profound legal scholar, he had a great knowledge of Court procedures). At the same time, they probably agreed with O'Connell that his rapid advancement was due to his reputation as a safe "Government man". However, he did have certain principles: in particular, he was a convinced believer in Catholic Emancipation. As a judge he lobbied repeatedly for a peerage, but without success.

== Personal life ==
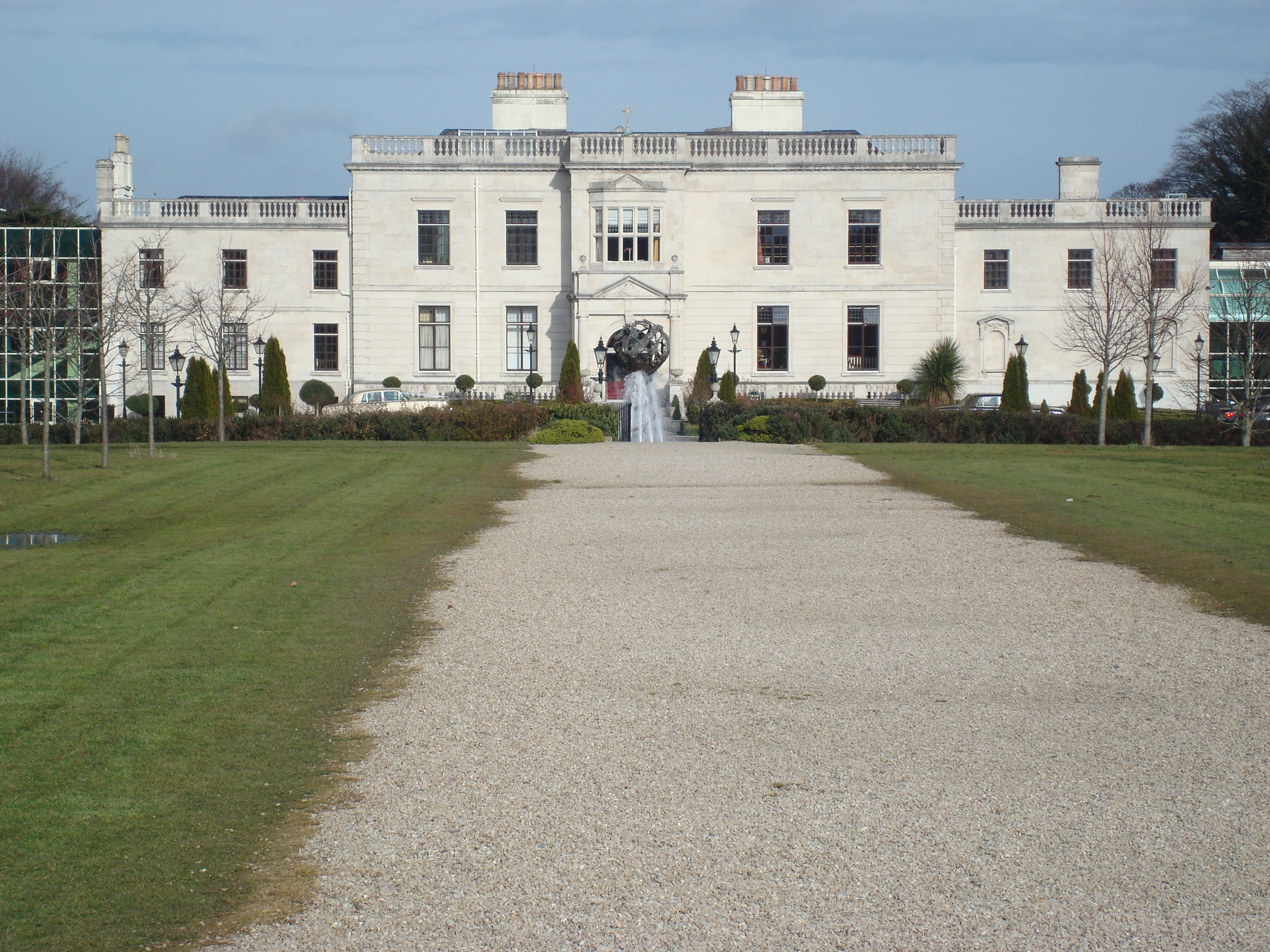
St. Helen's, Booterstown, where Doherty lived from 1830

Doherty married Elizabeth Lucy Wall, daughter of Charles William Wall, in 1822. They had seven children, including John, the eldest son and heir. His main residence was St. Helen's, Booterstown, which he bought in 1830, and to which he made several improvements. He also had a townhouse at Ely Place and a farm, called "Blacklion", in County Carlow. He died while on his annual summer holiday at Beaumaris in Anglesey.

In private life, he was noted as a keen coin collector and for his speculations, often unlucky, on the Stock Exchange. Due to his exceptional height, he was nicknamed "Long Jack". His courtroom manner was described as "theatrical and pompous", and his consciously "refined" accent made him an easy target for parody by opponents. On the other hand, his charm and sense of humour made him a popular figure in Dublin society.

Parliament of the United Kingdom
Preceded by Francis Leigh	Member of Parliament for New Ross; 1824–1826	Succeeded by William Wigram
Preceded by Denis Browne	Member of Parliament for Kilkenny City; 1826 – 1830	Succeeded by Nicholas Philpot Leader
Preceded by William Vesey-FitzGerald; Jonathan Raine	Member of Parliament for Newport; 1830; With: Jonathan Raine	Succeeded by Henry Hardinge; Jonathan Raine
Legal offices
Preceded by Henry Joy	Solicitor-General for Ireland; 1827–1830	Succeeded by Philip Cecil Crampton
Preceded by The Lord Plunket	Chief Justice of the Irish Common Pleas; 1830–1850	Succeeded by James Henry Monahan
