= Hugh Hyacinth O'Rorke MacDermot =

Irish lawyer

Hugh Hyacinth O'Rorke MacDermot, Prince of Coolavin PC, JP, DL, QC (1 July 1834 – 6 February 1904), was an Irish lawyer.

== Political and legal career ==
MacDermot served as Solicitor-General for Ireland in the Liberal government of 1886. He unsuccessfully contested the parliamentary constituency of West Derbyshire at the 1892 United Kingdom general election. He served as Attorney-General for Ireland in 1892, when he was made a member of the Irish Privy Council.

== Personal life ==
MacDermot was the eldest son of Charles Joseph MacDermot by his wife Arabella Mary, only child of Hyacinth O'Rorke, representative of the House of O'Rorke of Breffny. He succeeded his father 5 September 1873 as The Mac Dermot, Prince of Coolavin.

MacDermot died on 6 February 1904, and was succeeded by his eldest son, Charles Edward MacDermot. His grandson (by his fourth son, Henry) Niall MacDermot was a British Labour MP and junior minister between 1957 and 1970. His youngest son, Frank MacDermot, served as a member of both Dáil Éireann and Seanad Éireann between 1932 and 1942.

== See also ==
- Chiefs of the Name
- Kings of Moylurg

== Notes ==
Legal offices
Preceded by Samuel Walker	Solicitor-General for Ireland; 1885	Succeeded by John Monroe
Preceded by John George Gibson	Solicitor-General for Ireland; 1886	Succeeded by John George Gibson
Preceded by John Atkinson	Attorney-General for Ireland; 1892–1895	Succeeded by John Atkinson
Regnal titles
Preceded by Charles Joseph MacDermot	Prince of Coolavin; 1873–1904	Succeeded by Charles Edward MacDermot
