= Baron St Leonards =

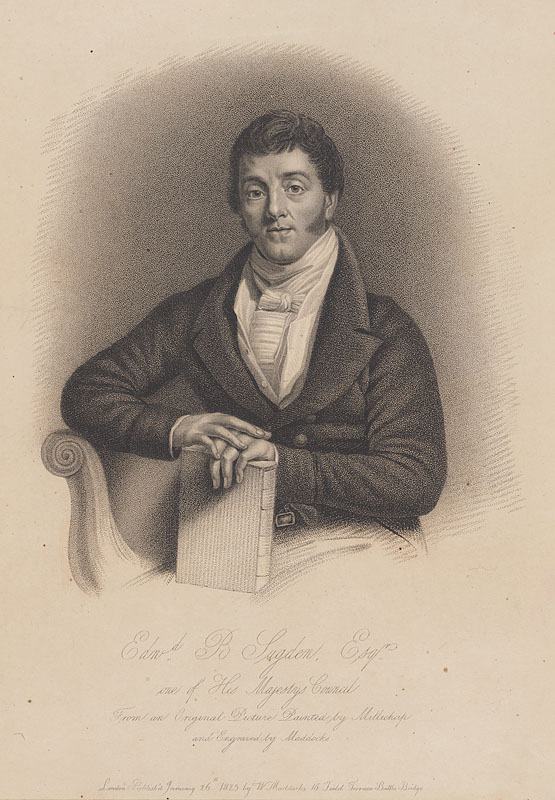
Edward Sugden, 1st Baron St Leonards.

Baron Saint Leonards, of Slaugham in the County of Sussex, was a title in the Peerage of the United Kingdom. It was created in 1852 for Sir Edward Sugden, Lord Chancellor in Lord Derby's 1852 administration. He was succeeded by his grandson, the second Baron. He was the son of the Hon. Henry Sugden, eldest son of the first Baron. He was succeeded by his nephew, the third Baron. He was the son of the Hon. Henry Frank Sugden, next brother of the second Baron. The title became extinct on the early passing of the fourth Baron in 1985.

== Barons Saint Leonards (1852) ==
- Edward Burtenshaw Sugden, 1st Baron St Leonards (1781–1875)
  - The Hon. Henry Sugden (1811–1866)
- Edward Burtenshaw Sugden, 2nd Baron Saint Leonards (1847–1908)
- Frank Edward Sugden, 3rd Baron Saint Leonards (1890–1972)
- John Gerald Sugden, 4th Baron Saint Leonards (1950–1985)

== Arms ==
Coat of arms of Baron St Leonards
Crest A leopard's head erased sable spotted and gorged with a baron's coronet or. Escutcheon Azure on a fess or between in chief two maidens' heads couped at the shoulders proper and in base a leopard's head erased of the second spotted sable an annulet gules. Supporters On either side a leopard or pellety and gorged with a baron's coronet of the first lined azure. Motto Labore vinces (You will overcome with effort).
