= Philip Cecil Crampton =

Irish judge

Solicitor-General for Ireland
- In office 1830–1834
- Preceded by: John Doherty
- Succeeded by: Michael O'Loghlen

Member of Parliament for Saltash
- In office February 1831 – May 1831
- Preceded by: Earl of Darlington
- Succeeded by: Frederick Villiers, Bethell Walrond

Member of Parliament for Milborne Port
- In office July 1831 – 1832
- Preceded by: Richard Lalor Sheil
- Succeeded by: Constituency abolished

Judge of the Court of Queen's Bench (Ireland)
- In office 1834–1859

Member of the Privy Council of Ireland

Personal details
- Born: May 1783 Dublin, Ireland
- Died: 29 December 1862 (aged 79)
- Spouse(s): Sidney Mary Browne (1817–1839), Margaret Duffy
- Education: Trinity College Dublin
- Occupation: Judge, Politician, Solicitor-General for Ireland

Philip Cecil Crampton PC (May 1783 in Dublin – 29 December 1862) was a judge, politician and Solicitor-General for Ireland. He was also a noted supporter of the cause of total abstinence from alcohol.

He was born in Dublin, the fourth son of the Reverend Cecil Crampton, vicar of Headfort, County Galway, and Nicola Mary Marsh, daughter of the Rev. Jeremy Marsh, rector of Athenry, aunt of Sir Henry Marsh and great-granddaughter of Archbishop Francis Marsh. His namesake, the celebrated doctor Sir Philip Crampton, 1st Baronet, was a cousin, a fact which benefitted his career. Another useful family connection was Charles Kendal Bushe, Lord Chief Justice of Ireland, who married the Baronet's sister Anne.

He was educated at Trinity College Dublin, where he was an outstanding student, and gold medallist; later becoming a Fellow of the university (1807–16) and Regius Professor of Law in 1816. He entered Lincoln's Inn in 1808. He was called to the Irish Bar in 1810.

He was appointed Solicitor-General in 1830. He was elected Member of Parliament (MP) for Saltash in February 1831, and MP for Milborne Port in July 1831. He was judge of the Court of Queen's Bench (Ireland) 1834–1859.

In politics, he was a Whig and a strong supporter of progressive Whig causes such as Parliamentary reform and abolition of the slave trade. Though a fine academic lawyer and a "pleasant and tactful" advocate, he was not considered much of a politician. His various proposals to reform the Irish legal system met with little support, and he clashed repeatedly with Daniel O'Connell (he was to be one of the judges at O'Connell's trial in 1844).

O'Connell opposed Crampton's appointment to the Bench, calling him "utterly incompetent", lacking in integrity, and chosen only due to his friendships with senior judges. O'Connell however disliked and despised nearly all the Irish judges of his time, and his low opinion of Crampton was not generally shared: when he retired, it was said that no judge's reputation stood higher. Most contemporaries praised him as "a true gentleman, a true Christian, and a noted philanthropist".

He married firstly in 1817 Sidney Mary Browne, who died in 1839, and secondly Margaret Duffy, daughter of John Duffy. By his second marriage, he had one son, Cecil, who died at nineteen.

He lived in considerable state at his home St. Valery, near Bray, County Wicklow, but was not noted for hospitality. A strict advocate of temperance, who maintained that two-thirds of crime in Ireland was drink related, he refused to serve alcohol to his guests, and according to a much-repeated story, poured the entire contents of the St. Valery wine cellar into the nearby River Dargle.

He retired from the Bench in 1859 and died at St. Valery in 1862. Cecil, his only son, died four years later while still in his teens. The estate passed to another branch of the Crampton family.

Parliament of the United Kingdom
Preceded by Earl of Darlington; John Gregson	Member of Parliament for Saltash; February 1831 – May 1831; With: Earl of Darlington	Succeeded by Frederick Villiers; Bethell Walrond
Preceded by Richard Lalor Sheil; George Byng	Member of Parliament for Milborne Port; July 1831–1832; With: George Byng	Constituency abolished
Legal offices
Preceded by John Doherty	Solicitor-General for Ireland; 1830–1834	Succeeded by Michael O'Loghlen
