= Ebenezer Jacob =

Irish politician

Member of Parliament for Dungarvan
- In office 1834–1835
- Preceded by: George Lamb
- Succeeded by: Michael O'Loghlen

Personal details
- Died: c. 1839

Ebenezer Jacob (died about 1839) was an Irish politician.

Jacob lived at Silver Spring in County Wexford. In 1827, he was reported as having fought a duel with Lieutenant Goodwin, the pair firing two shots each before they were arrested and bound over to keep the peace.

Jacob stood in the February 1834 Dungarvan by-election as a Radical, with the support of Daniel O'Connell. He topped the poll, but the election was declared void on petition. The May 1834 Dungarvan by-election was held, which Jacob again won, this time taking the seat in Parliament. He stood down at the 1835 UK general election.

From 1838, Jacob lived in London, and when arrested over a debt in 1839, he declared that he no longer owned any property in Ireland.

Parliament of the United Kingdom
Preceded by George Lamb	Member of Parliament for Dungarvan; 1834–1835	Succeeded by Michael O'Loghlen
