= Stephen Woulfe =

Irish barrister and Whig politician

Stephen Woulfe (1787 – 2 July 1840) was an Irish barrister and Whig politician. He served as Solicitor-General for Ireland in 1836 and as Attorney-General for Ireland in 1838. He was the first Roman Catholic to be appointed Chief Baron of the Irish Exchequer. He died young, due to a combination of chronic ill-health and overwork.

== Life ==
Woulfe was born at Tiermaclane House, Ennis, County Clare in 1787, second son of Stephen Woulfe and Honora Woulfe (née McNamara), daughter of Michael Macnamara and Bridget Waters. His father was a third cousin to the great general James Wolfe; his mother was a sister of Admiral James Macnamara. Stephen was a younger son, and the family estates passed to his elder brother Peter.

He was educated at the lay college at St Patrick's College, Maynooth, before becoming one of the first Catholics to attend Trinity College Dublin, where he studied law, before being called to the Bar in 1814.

He was elected Member of Parliament (MP) for Cashel at a by-election in 1835, and held the seat until his resignation from the House of Commons in 1838. He contributed little to the debates, due to his chronic ill-health. He showed great zeal in the fight for Catholic Emancipation; but incurred the hostility of Daniel O'Connell by arguing that the Government was entitled to exercise a royal veto of the appointment of bishops. O'Connell subjected Woulfe to public ridicule, asking "are the sheep to be left to the mercy of this wolf (Woulfe)"? Woulfe's views endeared him to the Government and this, together with his undoubted legal ability, ensured his rapid promotion to Law Officer, and then the Bench.

The phrase "racy of the soil", though strongly associated with the Young Ireland movement, was originally coined by Woulfe, in a speech supporting the setting up of municipal corporations in Ireland.

== Family ==
He was married to Frances Hamill, daughter of Roger Hamill of Dowth, County Meath, and had a son and a daughter. His son Stephen Roland Woulfe inherited the family estates from his uncle Peter in 1865 (but not Tiermacrane House, which was by then in a ruinous state). The judge's grandson Edward Sheil, the son of his daughter Mary Leonora Woulfe (died 1869) who married Sir Justin Sheil, was an Irish Nationalist MP. Lady Sheil was the author of Glimpses of Manners and Life in Persia (1856). Her daughter Laura married the Spanish diplomat Pedro de Zulueta and was the mother of Francis de Zulueta, Regius Professor of Law at the University of Oxford. Another daughter Maria Emily married her cousin, the leading journalist John Woulfe Flanagan.

His sister Mary, who married Terence Flanagan of Knockahill, County Roscommon, named her son Stephen Woulfe Flanagan. The nephew followed his uncle to the Bar and Bench, ending his career as justice of the Court of Chancery (Ireland).

== Chief Baron ==
According to Elrington Ball, the Court of Exchequer (Ireland) at this time had the heaviest workload of any of the Irish superior Courts, and its Chief Baron needed a strong physical constitution to cope with the burden of office. Despite his undoubted legal ability, Woulfe's chronic ill-health made him a very poor choice for the office, and indeed he did not seek it: Maziere Brady and Edward Pennefather were his own suggested candidates for Chief Baron. He finally yielded, though, to his party's pleas to take office and, in Ball's phrase, "the job killed him in two years". He went to Baden-Baden in hope of a cure, but his health did not improve, and he died there on 2 July 1840 following an unsuccessful operation.

== Character and appearance ==
Woulfe was described as a man "careless of attire, awkward and angular in his movements, but very effective in his utterances; no profound lawyer, but a man of quick and shrewd observation."

Parliament of the United Kingdom
Preceded by Louis Perrin	Member of Parliament for Cashel; 1835–1838	Succeeded by Joseph Stock
Legal offices
Preceded by John Richards	Solicitor-General for Ireland; 1836–1837	Succeeded by Maziere Brady
Preceded by John Richards	Attorney-General for Ireland; 1837–1838	Succeeded by Nicholas Ball
Preceded by Henry Joy	Chief Baron of the Irish Exchequer; 1838–1840	Succeeded by Maziere Brady
