= Frederick Villiers Meynell =

British Whig politician

Frederick Villiers Meynell (24 March 1801 – 27 May 1872) was a British Whig politician.

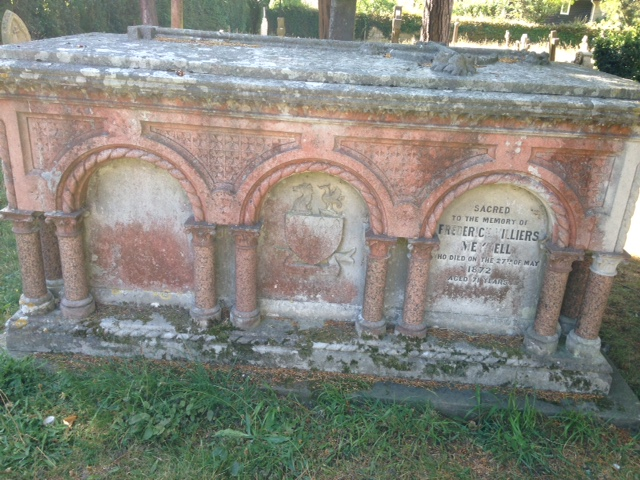
Frederick Villiers Maynell's tomb, St Wilfrid's Churchyard, Haywards Heath

Villiers, or Meynell, was the natural son of a Mr Meynell and a Miss Hunlocke. Sponsored by the Villiers family, although not related to it, in early life he was known as Frederick Villiers. He was educated at Eton and Trinity College, Cambridge, where he became known as "Savage Villiers" (while Charles Villiers was "Civil Villiers") and was called to the Bar from Lincoln's Inn. He later adopted his biological father's surname of Meynell.

He was returned to parliament for the rotten borough of Saltash in 1832, but lost his seat the following year when the constituency was abolished in the Great Reform Act. In January 1835 he was elected for Canterbury. However, he was unseated on petition already in March of that year on the grounds that he had not enough real estate income and for having bribed the voters. He stood for the same constituency in 1837 but was heavily defeated. In 1841 he returned to the House of Commons when he was elected for Sudbury alongside David Ochterlony Dyce Sombre, who spent approximately £3,000 on the election. In parliament he notably spoke against the Corn Laws. However, in April 1842 his and Dyce Sombre's elections were declared void due to "gross, systematic and extensive bribery". In 1844 the constituency was disfranchised on the grounds of corruption.

He was later given a sinecure by Lord Chief Justice Sir Alexander Cockburn, a Cambridge contemporary, who appointed him a Registrar of Deeds for Middlesex. The actual work was done by a deputy.

Meynell died in May 1872, aged 71. He was buried in Haywards Heath, Sussex.

Parliament of the United Kingdom
Preceded by Earl of Darlington; Philip Cecil Crampton	Member of Parliament for Saltash; 1831–1832; With: Bethell Walrond	Constituency abolished
Preceded by Richard Watson; Viscount Fordwich	Member of Parliament for Canterbury; January–March 1835; With: Lord Albert Conyngham	Succeeded by Lord Albert Conyngham; Stephen Rumbold Lushington
Preceded by Joseph Bailey; George Tomline	Member of Parliament for Sudbury; 1841–1842; With: David Ochterlony Dyce Sombre	Constituency disenfranchised
