= Henry Joy (judge) =

Irish judge

Henry Joy (born 7 January 1766; died 5 June 1838 in Rathfarnham, near Dublin) was an Irish judge. He was appointed Solicitor-General for Ireland in 1822, and Attorney-General for Ireland in 1827. He was made Chief Baron of the Irish Exchequer in 1831, a position he held until his death in 1838. He was a cousin of the United Irishmen leader, Henry Joy McCracken.

== Family ==
He was born in Belfast, son of Henry Joy and grandson of Francis Joy; his mother was Barbara Dunbar, daughter of George Dunbar from Dungannon. The Joy family, who were of Huguenot origin, were among Belfast's leading industrialists, and Francis founded the Belfast News Letter. Henry's aunt Ann was the mother of Henry Joy McCracken. The future judge did not share his cousin's passion for politics; although he opposed the Act of Union 1800, he was generally considered to be a strictly "non-political" judge. Although he had a deep personal affection for his cousin, disapproved strongly of McCracken's role in the republican insurrection of 1798, and for which he was executed. He also admired another United Irishman, Thomas Russell, and unsuccessfully defended him on a charge of treason, following the Irish Rebellion of 1803.

== Career ==
He was educated at Trinity College Dublin, entered Middle Temple in 1783 and was called to the Bar in 1788. He went on the northeast circuit and specialised in equity. He was an acknowledged expert in this field of law, but his career progressed slowly, due perhaps due to his lack of interest in politics. He took silk in 1808, and became Third Sergeant in 1814, Second Sergeant in 1816 and First Sergeant in 1817.

According to Elrington Ball, his promotion from Attorney-General to Chief Baron was a purely political decision. Although Joy was well qualified for the position on grounds of legal ability, the appointment was intended to please Daniel O'Connell. O'Connell, however, had quarrelled with Joy, as he had with most of the Irish judiciary, accusing him of deep hostility towards Roman Catholics. So far from being pleased with Joy's elevation, O'Connell unsuccessfully sought his removal from the Bench.

Joy died in 1838 at his residence Woodtown Park, Rathfarnham, County Dublin, and was buried in Monkstown. He never married, sharing Woodtown with his sisters Harriet and Grace.

== Character ==
A popular verse, punning on his surname, suggests that he was a rather dour character: "tho' he smiles, 'tis less with mirth than pleasure". He was noted for his dedication to the law and lack of interest in politics, but he did not lack other enthusiasms. He was deeply interested in ornithology and arboriculture, and kept a small private museum at Woodtown. He was a noted traveller, who went as far as Constantinople.

Legal offices
Preceded by Charles Kendal Bushe	Solicitor-General for Ireland; 1822–1827	Succeeded by John Doherty
Preceded by William Plunket	Attorney-General for Ireland; 1827–1830	Succeeded by Edward Pennefather
Preceded by Standish O'Grady	Chief Baron of the Irish Exchequer; 1831–1838	Succeeded by Stephen Woulfe
