= William Plunket, 1st Baron Plunket =

Irish politician and lawyer

The Right Honourable The Lord Plunket QC PC
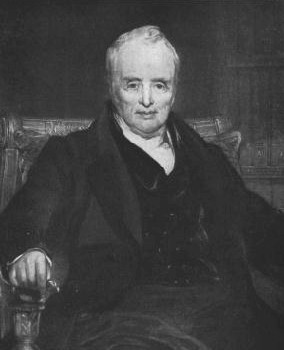
- Lord Plunket.

Lord Chancellor of Ireland
- In office 23 December 1830 – November 1834
- Monarch: William IV
- Prime Minister: The Earl Grey; The Viscount Melbourne
- Preceded by: Sir Anthony Hart
- Succeeded by: Sir Edward Sugden
- In office 30 April 1835 – 1841
- Monarchs: William IV; Queen Victoria
- Prime Minister: The Viscount Melbourne
- Preceded by: Sir Edward Sugden
- Succeeded by: Sir John Campbell

Personal details
- Born: 1 July 1764 Enniskillen, County Fermanagh
- Died: 5 January 1854 (aged 89) County Wicklow
- Party: Whig
- Spouse: Catherine MacCausland
- Education: Trinity College Dublin

William Conyngham Plunket, 1st Baron Plunket, PC (Ire), QC (1 July 1764 – 5 January 1854) was an Irish politician and lawyer. After gaining public notoriety as the prosecutor in the treason trial of Robert Emmet in 1803, he rose rapidly in government service. He became Lord Chancellor of Ireland in 1830 and served, with a brief interruption, in that post until his retirement in 1841.

== Background and education ==
The son of a Presbyterian minister, Reverend Thomas Plunket of Dublin, and his wife Mary (née Conyngham), Plunket was born in Enniskillen, County Fermanagh, and educated at Trinity College Dublin. After graduating in 1784, he was admitted as a student at Lincoln's Inn, and was called to the Irish bar three years later.

== Prosecution of Robert Emmet and political career ==
Plunket was made a King's Counsel in 1795, and three years later was elected to the Irish House of Commons as a Member of Parliament for Charlemont. After the Act of Union was passed, Plunket lost his seat, and failed to be elected to Westminster for Dublin University in 1802. He was restored to prominence in September 1803 as the prosecuting counsel in the treason trial of Robert Emmet.

Lord Castlereagh, as a principal architect of the Acts of Union, had been acutely embarrassed by Emmet's abortive rising in Dublin. He advised that "the best thing would be to go into no detail whatever upon the case, to keep the subject clearly standing on its own narrow base of a contemptible insurrection without means or respectable leaders". It is an instruction that Plunket appears to have followed.

The prosecution itself presented no difficulty: the evidence was overwhelming and the Crown had taken the extra precaution of suborning Emmet's defence attorney, Leonard McNally, for £200 and a pension. But when McNally announced that the trial was concluded because his client wished to call no witnesses nor "take up the time of the court", Plunket took to his feet to berate the prisoner. He mocked Emmet as the deluded leader of a conspiracy encompassing "the bricklayer, the old clothes man, the hodman and the hostler".

Plunket was made Solicitor-General for Ireland and, in 1805, Attorney-General for Ireland. He was also raised to the Irish Privy Council. As Solicitor General, Plunket was one of the Irish officials singled out for attack in a series of scurrilous letters published by the radical journalist William Cobbett in his weekly newspaper Political Register.

Plunket was alluded to as "the viper" who "in an unheard of exercise of prerogative" had "wantonly lashed [...] the dying son of his former friend [Emmet's father at whose table it was alleged Plunket had often dined], when that dying son produced no evidence, and had made no defence; but on the contrary had acknowledged his offence and submitted to his fate". Plunket was able to bring successful libel cases both against Cobbett and against the author of the letters, "Juverna" (a variant of Hibernia, Ireland) whom he had unmasked as Robert Johnson, a judge of the Court of Common Pleas (Ireland), who was forced to resign from the Bench as a result.

In January 1807, Plunket was returned to British House of Commons as a Whig member for Midhurst, representing the constituency for only three months, although he subsequently returned to the House of Commons in 1812 as the member for Dublin University, a seat which he continued to represent until May 1827.

In 1822 he was reappointed to the office of Attorney-General for Ireland, since William Saurin (Attorney General 1807–22) was implacably opposed to Catholic emancipation, which the Crown now accepted was inevitable. Plunket, unlike Saurin, supported Emancipation and was able to work in reasonable harmony with Daniel O'Connell to secure it.

In 1827, relinquishing his seat in the House of Commons, he was raised to the Peerage of the United Kingdom as Baron Plunket, of Newton in the County of Cork and was appointed Chief Justice of the Irish Common Pleas.

He was an advocate of Catholic emancipation, and served as Lord Chancellor of Ireland from 1830 to 1841, with a brief interval when the Tories were in power between 1834 and 1835. He was forced into retirement to allow Sir John Campbell to assume office.

His tenure as Chancellor was not without controversy: opponents accused him of political partisanship, lengthy absences from work, and nepotism on a scale unusual even in an age when it was understood that officeholders took care of their relatives.

== Family ==
Plunket was married to Catherine McCausland, daughter of John McCausland of Strabane and Elizabeth Span, daughter of Reverend William Span of Ballmacove, County Donegal. Their son Thomas became Church of Ireland Bishop of Tuam, Killala and Achonry. Thomas's eldest daughter the Honourable Katherine Plunket (1820–1932) was the longest-lived Irish person ever. Their other children included sons Patrick (died 1859), judge of the Court of Bankruptcy, and Robert (Dean of Tuam from 1850), and a daughter, Louisa. In Dublin, Plunket was a member of Daly's Club. He died in January 1854, aged 89, at his country house, Old Connaught, near Bray, County Wicklow, and was succeeded in the barony by his eldest son, Thomas.

He lived in considerable state: Sir Walter Scott, who visited him at Old Connaught, left a glowing tribute to Plunket's charm and hospitality, and the excellence of his food and wine.

Coat of arms of William Plunket, 1st Baron Plunket
| Crest A horse passant Argent charged on the shoulder with a portcullis. Escutcheon Sable a bend a castle in chief and a portcullis in base Argent. Supporters Dexter an antelope Proper sinister a horse Argent both charged on the shoulder with a portcullis Sable. Motto Festina Lente |

Parliament of Ireland
| Preceded by Richard Mountney Jephson; Viscount Caulfeild | Member of Parliament for Charlemont; 1798 – 1801; With: Richard Mountney Jephson 1798; Francis Dobbs 1798–1801 | Succeeded by Parliament of the United Kingdom |
Parliament of the United Kingdom
| Preceded by John Smith; William Wickham | Member of Parliament for Midhurst; 1807; With: Henry Watkin Williams-Wynn | Succeeded by Samuel Smith; James Abercromby |
| Preceded by John Leslie Foster | Member of Parliament for Dublin University; 1812–1827 | Succeeded by John Wilson Croker |
Legal offices
| Preceded by James McClelland | Solicitor-General for Ireland; 1803–1805 | Succeeded by Charles Kendal Bushe |
| Preceded by Standish O'Grady | Attorney-General for Ireland; 1805–1807 | Succeeded by William Saurin |
| Preceded by William Saurin | Attorney-General for Ireland; 1822–1827 | Succeeded by Henry Joy |
| Preceded by The Earl of Norbury | Chief Justice of the Irish Common Pleas; 1827–30 | Succeeded by John Doherty |
Political offices
| Preceded by Sir Anthony Hart | Lord Chancellor of Ireland; 1830–1834 | Succeeded by Sir Edward Sugden |
| Preceded by Sir Edward Sugden | Lord Chancellor of Ireland; 1835–1841 | Succeeded by Sir John Campbell |
Peerage of the United Kingdom
| New creation | Baron Plunket; 1827–1854 | Succeeded by Thomas Plunket |
