= Luke Fox (judge) =

Luke Fox (c. 1757 – c. 1819) was a judge of the Court of Common Pleas in Ireland in the early 19th century. In 1805, he was accused of judicial misconduct over his handling of a number of cases. Three petitions were presented to the House of Lords alleging that he had allowed his political preferences to sway his conduct as a judge. He was accused of trying to persuade a grand jury to find a verdict for political reasons, fining a High Sheriff for tardiness without good cause, insulting a trial jury, and defaming John Hamilton, 1st Marquess of Abercorn, who was described as "the last man whom one could attack with impunity".

The Prime Minister urged the Lords to abandon the case against Fox; they complied with his request, and Fox continued to serve for a further eleven years, altogether he had sought early retirement quite soon after his appointment.

He was initially, but wrongly suspected of being the author of the notoriously scurrilous "Juverna" letters, whose publication caused a major political scandal in 1803-5.

== Biography ==
He was born in County Leitrim, the fifth son of Michael Fox of Tully, a small landowner, and Margaret Coane. Fox was privately educated by a Dr. Armstrong. He graduated from Trinity College Dublin in 1779 and entered Lincoln's Inn in 1781. His father was not a rich man, and had a large family to support, and Luke paid his way through university by giving private tuition lessons. He was called to the Irish Bar in 1784 and practised on the north-western circuit. He was an excellent lawyer. He joined the Whig Club and wrote political pamphlets for the Whig Party.

In 1790 he made an extremely advantageous marriage to Anne, daughter of Richard Annesley and Mary Tottenham, and niece of Charles Loftus, 1st Marquess of Ely. They had three children, including Michael who married Katherine Bushe, daughter of Charles Kendal Bushe, Lord Chief Justice of Ireland. He had a townhouse on Harcourt Street in central Dublin and a country residence at Trimleston near Clonskeagh, now a suburb in South Dublin.

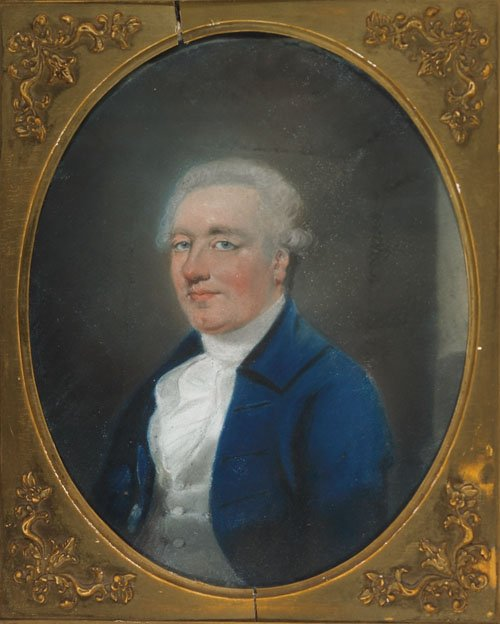
Charles Loftus, 1st Marquess of Ely, Luke's uncle by marriage, who acted as his political patron

== MP and judge ==
Proceedings Against Luke Fox Act 1805
- Act of Parliament
- Parliament of the United Kingdom
- Long title: An Act to continue the Proceedings in the House of Lords touching the Conduct of Luke Fox, Esquire, One of the Judges of the Court of Common Pleas of that Part of the United Kingdom called Ireland, not-withstanding any Prorogation or Dissolution of Parliament.
- Citation: 45 Geo. 3. c. 117
- Territorial extent: United Kingdom

Dates
- Royal assent: 10 July 1805
- Commencement: 10 July 1805 (Note: The Acts of Parliament (Commencement) Act 1793.)
- Repealed: 6 August 1872
Other legislation
Repealed by	Statute Law Revision Act 1872

Status: Repealed

Text of statute as originally enacted

Through Lord Ely's patronage he entered the Irish House of Commons as MP for Fethard, and later sat for Clonmines and then for Mullingar. He and Ely later quarrelled over his initial attitude to the Act of Union 1800, which was ambiguous. He later became a strong supporter of the Union, and in the last stages of the passing of the Bill for the Union, his services were of such value to the Crown that he was among the first barristers to be appointed to the bench after the Union.

His conduct after his elevation seemed to be specially designed to irritate the Government: apart from his extraordinary behaviour on circuit in 1803, which led to the attempt to remove him from office, he was often absent from duty in England for months on end. He also applied for compensation for the delay in issuing his patent.

He died suddenly three years after his retirement, at Harrogate. His widow married Thomas West in 1831.

== Character ==
Fox was a superb advocate, but notoriously bad-tempered, and so untrustworthy that it was said that "Fox" was the perfect name for him. Daniel O'Connell described him as "morose, sour and impetuous", while another critical witness described him as "vulgar, coarse, harsh and cunning". He was a firm believer in judicial independence. His strange conduct while on the North-West circuit in 1803, which led to his abortive impeachment, is difficult to explain, even allowing for his hot temper: Ball states that he "lost his head completely". He was accused of partisan political motives; on the other hand, as Ball remarks, the Robert Emmet rising and the murder of the Lord Chief Justice of Ireland, Arthur Wolfe, 1st Viscount Kilwarden, had left the whole judiciary in an extremely agitated state, and better-tempered men than Fox were behaving strangely.

== The Juverna affair ==
Fox's eventual acquittal on the charges of misconduct did not redeem his reputation with his colleagues, many of whom thought him unfit for office. It is significant that when in 1803 a series of scurrilous attacks on the Irish Government was published by the radical English journalist William Cobbett by a writer using the pen-name "Juverna", who from the internal evidence can only have been a senior Irish judge, Fox was immediately suspected of being the author, despite his vehement denials. In fact, the author was another High Court judge, Robert Johnson, who after a long delay was prosecuted and convicted of seditious libel, and forced to retire under threat of being removed from office. Fox managed with some difficulty to convince his colleagues of his innocence, but he could not alter their low opinion of him.

== Bibliography ==
- Volcansek, Mary L. (1996). Judicial Misconduct: A Cross-National Comparison. Gainesville, Fla.: University Press of Florida. ISBN 0-8130-1421-2.
