= George Grenville Wandisford Pigott =

English politician (1796–1865)

George Grenville Wandisford Pigott (10 March 1796 – 4 January 1865) was MP for St. Mawes from 3 May 1830 till 1832.

== Family and education ==
He was the first son of William Pigott (died 1838) and Anne, the daughter of Rev. William King. He was educated at Rugby College and matriculated in 1808. On 26 October 1822, he married his first wife, Charlotte, the daughter of Edward Beeston Long and she died at Torquay on 20 March 1823. On 30 October 1838, he married his second wife, Charlotte, the daughter of William Lloyd and they had one son and one daughter.

== Parliamentary career ==
In 1823, he secured a position as attaché to the Württemberg embassy. From 1825 till early 1830, he served in Denmark, effectively acting as secretary of legation. In May 1830, he entered Parliament for St. Mawes. On 17 May 1830, he voted for Jewish emancipation. On 21 June and 1 July 1830, he opposed amendments to the beer bill. In summer 1830, he was re-elected for St. Mawes. In 1832, his parliamentary career ended when St. Mawes was disfranchised.

== Later life ==
In 1832, he published Letter on the Present Corn Laws. In 1839, he published Manual of Scandinavian Mythology. From 1845 till c. 1862, he served as assistant poor law commissioner. Upon his retirement, he published a pamphlet on poor law reform (Laws of Settlement and Removal). He died in January 1865 and his estate passed to his son, William Harvey Pigott (1848–1924).
