= James McClelland (solicitor-general) =

Irish politician

James McClelland (born c. 1768, died 1831 in Annaverna) was an Irish politician, Solicitor-General, and Baron of the Court of Exchequer (Ireland). He is mainly remembered for the crushing remark by Daniel O'Connell that McClelland was no example to his profession either as a barrister or a judge.

== Biography ==
He was the son of James McClelland of Millmount, County Down. He attended Trinity College Dublin, entered Middle Temple in 1787, and was called to the Irish Bar in 1790. He became the Member of Parliament for Randalstown in 1798, and was appointed as Solicitor-General in 1801, as a reward for his support for the Act of Union 1801. He was raised to the Bench in 1803 as Baron of the Exchequer (rather against his own wish, since aged only 35 he felt he was too young for high office), and served to his retirement in 1830. He married Charlotte Thompson of County Louth in 1797. They are buried at Ballymascanlon, where a memorial was erected to them.

In 1819 he was accused of judicial misconduct in ordering soldiers to clear the public out of his courtroom: but the House of Commons decided not to pursue the matter, since the allegations, even if true, did not amount to misconduct.

Daniel O'Connell, who despised most of the Irish judges of his time, had a particularly low opinion of McClelland. Although no precise date can be given, historians accept the truth of the story that McClelland saw O'Connell sitting in Court in a case he was not briefed in, in the apparent hope that a younger barrister would ask him to assist him in conducting the case. McClelland said that he personally had never behaved in such a way as a barrister: O'Connell sternly replied that McClelland had never been his model as a barrister, and he did not propose to take directions from him as a judge.

Parliament of Ireland
| Preceded by Isaac Corry; George Jackson | Member of Parliament for Randalstown; 1798 – 1801; With: George Jackson | Succeeded by Parliament of the United Kingdom |
Legal offices
| Preceded by William Cusack-Smith | Solicitor-General for Ireland; 1801–1803 | Succeeded by William Plunket |
