= First Peel ministry =

Government of the United Kingdom

- 1834–1835
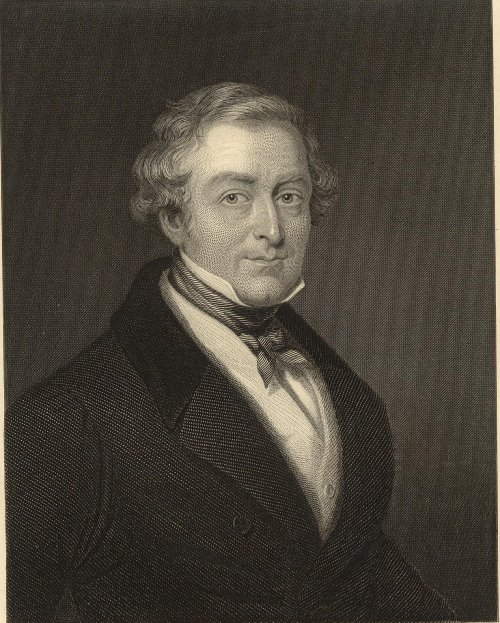
- Sir Robert Peel
- Date formed: 10 December 1834
- Date dissolved: 8 April 1835

People and organisations
- Monarch: William IV
- Prime Minister: Sir Robert Peel
- Status in legislature: Minority
- Opposition leaders: Lord John Russell in the House of Commons; The Viscount Melbourne in the House of Lords

History
- Outgoing election: 1835 general election
- Predecessor: Wellington caretaker ministry
- Successor: Second Melbourne ministry

Sir Robert Peel's first government succeeded the caretaker ministry of Arthur Wellesley, 1st Duke of Wellington. Peel was also Chancellor of the Exchequer while the Duke of Wellington served as Foreign Secretary. A young William Ewart Gladstone held office as a Junior Lord of the Treasury, his first governmental post in a ministerial career that would span for the next sixty years.

The Peel ministry was a minority government, and relied on Whig support. However, this the Whigs felt disinclined to give, joining with the Irish radicals to defeat the Conservatives at every turn. After a reign of only four months, the government felt obliged to resign, whereupon the Whig leader William Lamb, 2nd Viscount Melbourne formed his second government.

== Cabinet ==
=== December 1834 – April 1835 ===
Office	Name	Term
First Lord of the Treasury; Chancellor of the Exchequer; Leader of the House of Commons	Sir Robert Peel	December 1834 – April 1835
Lord Chancellor	John Copley, 1st Baron Lyndhurst	December 1834 – April 1835
Lord President of the Council	James St Clair-Erskine, 2nd Earl of Rosslyn	December 1834 – April 1835
Lord Privy Seal	James Stuart-Wortley-Mackenzie, 1st Baron Wharncliffe	December 1834 – April 1835
Home Secretary	Henry Goulburn	December 1834 – April 1835
Foreign Secretary; Leader of the House of Lords	Arthur Wellesley, 1st Duke of Wellington	December 1834 – April 1835
Secretary of State for War and the Colonies	George Hamilton-Gordon, 4th Earl of Aberdeen	December 1834 – April 1835
First Lord of the Admiralty	Thomas Robinson, 2nd Earl de Grey	December 1834 – April 1835
Master-General of the Ordnance	Sir George Murray	December 1834 – April 1835
President of the Board of Trade; Master of the Mint	Alexander Baring	December 1834 – April 1835
President of the Board of Control	Edward Law, 2nd Baron Ellenborough	December 1834 – April 1835
Paymaster of the Forces	Sir Edward Knatchbull, 9th Baronet	December 1834 – April 1835
Secretary at War	John Charles Herries	December 1834 – April 1835

== List of ministers ==
Members of the Cabinet are indicated by bold face.

Office	Name	Date
Prime Minister, First Lord of the Treasury and Leader of the House of Commons	Sir Robert Peel	10 December 1834 – 8 April 1835
Chancellor of the Exchequer	Sir Robert Peel	10 December 1834
Financial Secretary to the Treasury	Sir Thomas Fremantle	20 December 1834
Parliamentary Secretary to the Treasury	Sir George Clerk, 6th Baronet	19 December 1834
Junior Lords of the Treasury	William Yates Peel	26 December 1834 – 8 April 1835
Junior Lords of the Treasury	Henry Pelham-Clinton, Earl of Lincoln	26 December 1834 – 8 April 1835
Junior Lords of the Treasury	William Murray, Viscount Stormont	26 December 1834 – 8 April 1835
Junior Lords of the Treasury	Charles Ross	26 December 1834 – 8 April 1835
Junior Lords of the Treasury	William Ewart Gladstone	26 December 1834 – 27 January 1835
Junior Lords of the Treasury	John Iltyd Nicholl	14 March 1835 – 8 April 1835
Lord Chancellor	John Copley, 1st Baron Lyndhurst	21 November 1834
Lord President of the Council	James St Clair-Erskine, 2nd Earl of Rosslyn	15 December 1834
Lord Privy Seal	James Stuart-Wortley-Mackenzie, 1st Baron Wharncliffe	15 December 1834
Secretary of State for the Home Department	Henry Goulburn	15 December 1834
Under-Secretary of State for the Home Department	William Gregson	3 January 1835
Secretary of State for Foreign Affairs and Leader of the House of Lords	Arthur Wellesley, 1st Duke of Wellington	17 November 1834
Under-Secretary of State for Foreign Affairs	Philip Stanhope, Viscount Mahon	17 December 1834
Secretary of State for War and the Colonies	George Hamilton-Gordon, 4th Earl of Aberdeen	20 December 1834
Under-Secretary of State for War and the Colonies	John Stuart-Wortley	20 December 1834
Under-Secretary of State for War and the Colonies	William Ewart Gladstone	27 January 1835
First Lord of the Admiralty	Thomas Robinson, 2nd Earl de Grey	22 December 1834
First Secretary of the Admiralty	George Robert Dawson	24 December 1834
Civil Lord of the Admiralty	Anthony Ashley-Cooper, Baron Ashley	22 December 1834
President of the Board of Control	Edward Law, 2nd Baron Ellenborough	18 December 1834
Secretary of the Board of Control	Winthrop Mackworth Praed (Note: Joint Secretaries from 8 January 1835.)	20 December 1834 – 8 April 1835
Secretary of the Board of Control	Sidney Herbert	8 January 1835 – 8 April 1835
Master-General of the Ordnance	Sir George Murray	18 December 1834
Treasurer of the Ordnance	Thomas Creevey	Continued in office
Treasurer of the Ordnance	Alexander Perceval	12 January 1835
Surveyor-General of the Ordnance	Lord Edward Somerset	22 December 1834
Clerk of the Ordnance	Sir Edward Owen	22 December 1834
Storekeeper of the Ordnance	Francis Robert Bonham	22 December 1834
Paymaster of the Forces	Sir Edward Knatchbull, 9th Baronet	23 December 1834
President of the Board of Trade	Alexander Baring	15 December 1834
Vice-President of the Board of Trade	William Lowther, Viscount Lowther	20 December 1834
Secretary at War	J. C. Herries	16 December 1834
Chief Secretary for Ireland	Sir Henry Hardinge	16 December 1834
Lord Lieutenant of Ireland	Thomas Hamilton, 9th Earl of Haddington	1 January 1835
Chancellor of the Duchy of Lancaster	Charles Williams-Wynn	26 December 1834
Master of the Mint	Alexander Baring	23 December 1834
Treasurer of the Navy	William Lowther, Viscount Lowther	22 December 1834
Postmaster-General	William Wellesley-Pole, 1st Baron Maryborough	23 December 1834
First Commissioner of Woods and Forests	Lord Granville Somerset	23 December 1834
Attorney General	Sir Frederick Pollock, 1st Baronet	17 December 1834
Solicitor General	Sir William Webb Follett	20 December 1834
Judge Advocate General	Sir John Beckett, 2nd Baronet	18 December 1834
Lord Advocate	Sir Sir William Rae, 3rd Baronet	19 December 1834
Solicitor General for Scotland	Duncan McNeill	7 January 1835
Attorney General for Ireland	vacant	
Solicitor General for Ireland	Edward Pennefather	27 January 1835
Lord Steward of the Household	Thomas Egerton, 2nd Earl of Wilton	2 January 1835
Lord Chamberlain of the Household	George Child-Villiers, 5th Earl of Jersey	15 December 1834
Vice-Chamberlain of the Household	Frederick Stewart, Viscount Castlereagh	29 December 1834
Master of the Horse	Charles Sackville-Germain, 5th Duke of Dorset	1 January 1835
Treasurer of the Household	Sir William Henry Fremantle	27 May 1826 – Continued in office
Comptroller of the Household	Henry Lowry-Corry	29 December 1834
Captain of the Gentlemen-at-Arms	Henry Devereux, 14th Viscount Hereford	29 December 1834
Captain of the Yeomen of the Guard	James Stopford, 3rd Earl of Courtown	5 January 1835
Master of the Buckhounds	George Stanhope, 6th Earl of Chesterfield	30 December 1834

Notes

Preceded by Wellington caretaker ministry	Government of the United Kingdom; 1834–1835	Succeeded by Second Melbourne ministry
