= Edward Pennefather =

Irish barrister, Law Officer and judge

Edward Pennefather PC, KC (22 October 1774 – 6 September 1847) was an Irish barrister, Law Officer and judge of the Victorian era, who held office as Lord Chief Justice of Ireland.

== Early life ==
Pennefather was born in County Tipperary, the second son of William Pennefather of Knockeevan, member of the Irish House of Commons for Cashel, and his wife Ellen Moore, daughter of Edward Moore, Archdeacon of Emly and Ellen Dobson. He went to school in Clonmel and graduated from Trinity College Dublin. He was called to the Irish Bar in 1795. He lived at Rathsallagh House, near Dunlavin, County Wicklow.

His brother Richard Pennefather (1773–1859) had a longer and more successful career as a judge: appointed a Baron of the Court of Exchequer in 1821, he served for nearly 40 years and was held in universal regard; with the general support of the profession he remained on the Bench until shortly before his death at eighty-six, by which time he was blind. Edward and Richard, "the two Pennefathers", were leading practitioners in the Court of Chancery (Ireland).

Edward was generally regarded as more gifted, a master of the law of equity and also a skilled libel lawyer. In 1816 he was one of the lead counsel in the celebrated libel case of Bruce v. Grady, which arose from the publication of a scurrilous poem called "The Nosegay", written by a barrister Thomas Grady about his former friend, the notably eccentric banker George Evans Brady of Hermitage House, Castleconnell. The quarrel is said to have arisen from a dispute over money which Bruce had loaned to Grady. The plaintiff claimed £20000; the jury awarded £500.

== Law officer and judge ==
He was made a King's Counsel by 1816. He was very briefly Attorney-General for Ireland in 1830, and was made Third Serjeant-at-law (Ireland) in the same year. He became Second Serjeant and First Serjeant in the two following years. He was Solicitor-General for Ireland in the First Peel ministry in 1835 and again in the Second Peel ministry in 1841. In the latter year, he was appointed Lord Chief Justice of the Queen's Bench for Ireland and held the position until he resigned on health grounds in 1846.

== Reputation ==
According to Elrington Ball, Pennefather was considered to be one of the greatest Irish advocates of his time, and one with few rivals in any age, but he did not live up to expectations as a judge, due largely to his age and increasing ill-health. As a judge he is remembered mainly for presiding at the trial of Daniel O'Connell in 1843 for sedition, where his alleged bias against the accused damaged his reputation: he was accused of acting as prosecutor rather than judge, and his summing-up was described as simply an extra speech for the prosecution. Further damage to his reputation was done by the majority decision of the House of Lords quashing the verdict in the O'Connell case: while many of the errors were the fault of the prosecution, the Law Lords did not spare Pennefather for his conduct of the proceedings, and in particular for his summing-up. The Law Lords commented severely that the course of the trial, if condoned, would make a mockery of trial by jury in Ireland.

The related trial of Sir John Grey descended into farce when the Attorney General, Sir Thomas Cusack-Smith, who was noted for his hot temper, challenged one of the defence counsel Gerald Fitzgibbon to a duel, for having allegedly accused him of improper motives. Pennefather told the Attorney General severely that a man in his position had no excuse for such conduct, whereupon the Attorney General agreed to let the matter drop. The public noted with interest that Fitzgibbon's wife and daughter had been present in Court during the contretemps.

== Family ==
In 1806 he married Susannah Darby, eldest daughter of John Darby of Leap Castle, County Offaly, and his wife Anne Vaughan, and sister of John Nelson Darby, one of the most influential of the early Plymouth Brethren. They had ten children, including Edward, the eldest son and heir; Richard, Auditor General of Ceylon; Ellen, who married James Thomas O'Brien, Bishop of Ossory, Ferns and Leighlin, and Dorothea, (Dora) (1825–1859), who married in 1850, as his second wife, James Stopford, 4th Earl of Courtown, and had three sons. Two of Dora's sons, General Sir Frederick Stopford, commander at the Landing at Suvla Bay, and Admiral Walter Stopford, became famous.

Legal offices
Preceded by Henry Joy	Attorney-General for Ireland; 1830–1831	Succeeded by Francis Blackburne
Preceded by Michael O'Loghlen	Solicitor-General for Ireland; 1835	Succeeded by Michael O'Loghlen
Preceded by Richard Moore	Solicitor-General for Ireland; 1841	Succeeded by Joseph Devonsher Jackson
Preceded by Charles Kendal Bushe	Lord Chief Justice of Ireland; 1841–1846	Succeeded by Francis Blackburne
