= John Richards (Attorney General) =

Irish lawyer and judge

John Richards PC (1790 – 1872) was an Irish lawyer and judge.

== Early life ==
Richards was born in 1790 in Dublin, the younger son of John Nunn Richards (died 1821), solicitor, and his first wife Elizabeth Fitzgerald, daughter of Oliver Fitzgerald. His father's family originally came from Rathaspick, County Wexford, and his father had a country house at nearby Hermitage. The Richards family of Macmine Castle, Wexford, were close relatives. He graduated from Trinity College Dublin.

== Career ==
He was called to the Bar in 1811, and became King's Counsel in 1830.

He was a protégé of Daniel O'Connell, and in later years recalled with gratitude O'Connell, coming to his assistance in a case where the judges would not hear him: O'Connell argued the case on his behalf with frequent references to what "Mr. Richards would have said if he had been permitted to". Richards never ceased to praise O'Connell's "ability and perseverance". Like O'Connell, he was a staunch supporter of Catholic Emancipation.

He was appointed a judge at Madras (now Chennai) in India in 1835 but resigned that office in order to become Solicitor-General for Ireland in the same year, and he became Attorney-General for Ireland the following year. He was appointed a Baron of the Court of Exchequer (Ireland) in 1837 and held that office until 1859; he also served as a judge of the Encumbered Estates Court.

== Family and personal life ==
Richards married firstly in 1815 Catherine Moloney, daughter of Henry Gonne Moloney, barrister, of Tulla, County Clare, and his wife Caroline Walker, by whom he had seven children, three sons and four daughters: John, William, Oswald, Elizabeth who married a Mr. Rolleston, Catherine who married Thomas Spunner, Charlotte who married a Mr. Symes, and Henrietta-Caroline, who married Robert King Piers, nephew of Sir Robert King, 2nd Baronet of the King Baronets, of Charlestown, in 1844.

He married secondly in 1832 Christiana O'Brien, daughter of Christopher James O'Brien, but had no further issue.

His eldest son John became a County Court judge. One of the younger John's sons, Sir Henry George Richards, also became a judge, serving as Chief Justice of the Allahabad High Court, India, from 1911 to 1919.

He was elected a member of the Royal Dublin Society in 1831. In Dublin he lived in Dalkey, and later Dundrum, and he also had a country house in County Clare.

Ball describes him as one of the finest Irish judges of his time.

Legal offices
Preceded by Michael O'Loghlen	Solicitor-General for Ireland; 1835–1836	Succeeded by Stephen Woulfe
Preceded by Michael O'Loghlen	Attorney-General for Ireland; 1836–1837	Succeeded by Stephen Woulfe
