= Michael O'Loghlen =

Irish judge and politician

Micheal O'Loghlen

Solicitor-General for Ireland
- In office 1834–1834
- Preceded by: Philip Cecil Crampton
- Succeeded by: Edward Pennefather
- In office 1835–1835
- Preceded by: Edward Pennefather
- Succeeded by: John Richards

Attorney-General for Ireland
- In office 1835–1836
- Preceded by: Louis Perrin
- Succeeded by: John Richards

Member of Parliament for Dungarvan
- In office 1835–1837
- Preceded by: Ebenezer Jacob
- Succeeded by: John Power

Master of the Rolls
- In office 1837–1842
- Preceded by: Sir William MacMahon
- Succeeded by: Francis Blackburne

Personal details
- Born: 6 October 1789 Port Ruan, Ennis, County Clare
- Died: 28 September 1842 (aged 52) London, England

Sir Michael O'Loghlen, 1st Baronet (6 October 1789 – 28 September 1842) was an Irish judge and politician.

He was born at Port Ruan, Ennis, County Clare, the third son of Colman O'Loghlen and his second wife, Susannah Finucane, daughter of Dr. Michael Finucane. The O'Loghlens were descended from the princes of Corcomroe, in the Burren. He was educated in Trinity College Dublin and was called to the Irish Bar in 1811. Through sheer hard work, he gained a reputation as an outstanding pleader.

In 1817 he married Bidelia Kelly l, daughter of Daniel Kelly from Dublin. They had four sons, Colman, Hugh, Bryan and Michael and four daughters, Maria, Susan, Bidelia and Lucy.

In 1815 Sir Michael was junior counsel to Daniel O’Connell, whose friendship was of great assistance to him. In 1834 he became Solicitor-General for Ireland and was elected MP for Dungarvan from 1835 to 1837. He brought in the O'Loghlen Act for the Suppression of Drunkenness, which cleared the way for Father Mathew's temperance movement. In 1835 became Attorney-General for Ireland and was elevated to the Irish Bench as Baron of the Court of Exchequer in 1836, the first Roman Catholic to occupy a seat on the bench since 1688. He relinquished this office the following year on being appointed Master of the Rolls in Ireland. In July 1838 he was created a Baronet, of Drumcanora in Ennis.

O'Loghlen died in London. He is buried in the family vault at the old graveyard in Ruan. His mausoleum is an impressive Egyptian Revival tomb. A statue of Sir Michael O’Loghlen can be seen at the Ennis Courthouse. He was succeeded as baronet by his eldest son Colman, and on Colman's death by his younger son Bryan, Premier of Victoria.

Parliament of the United Kingdom
Preceded by Ebenezer Jacob	Member of Parliament for Dungarvan; 1835–1837	Succeeded by John Power
Political offices
Preceded by Philip Cecil Crampton	Solicitor-General for Ireland; 1834	Succeeded by Edward Pennefather
Preceded by Edward Pennefather	Solicitor-General for Ireland; 1835	Succeeded by John Richards
Preceded by Louis Perrin	Attorney-General for Ireland; 1835–1836	Succeeded by John Richards
Preceded by William MacMahon	Master of the Rolls in Ireland; 1837–1842	Succeeded by Francis Blackburne
Baronetage of the United Kingdom
New title	Baronet (of Drumcanora); 1838–1842	Succeeded by Colman Michael O'Loghlen
