= Wellington caretaker ministry =

Brief premiership of the Duke of Wellington in 1834

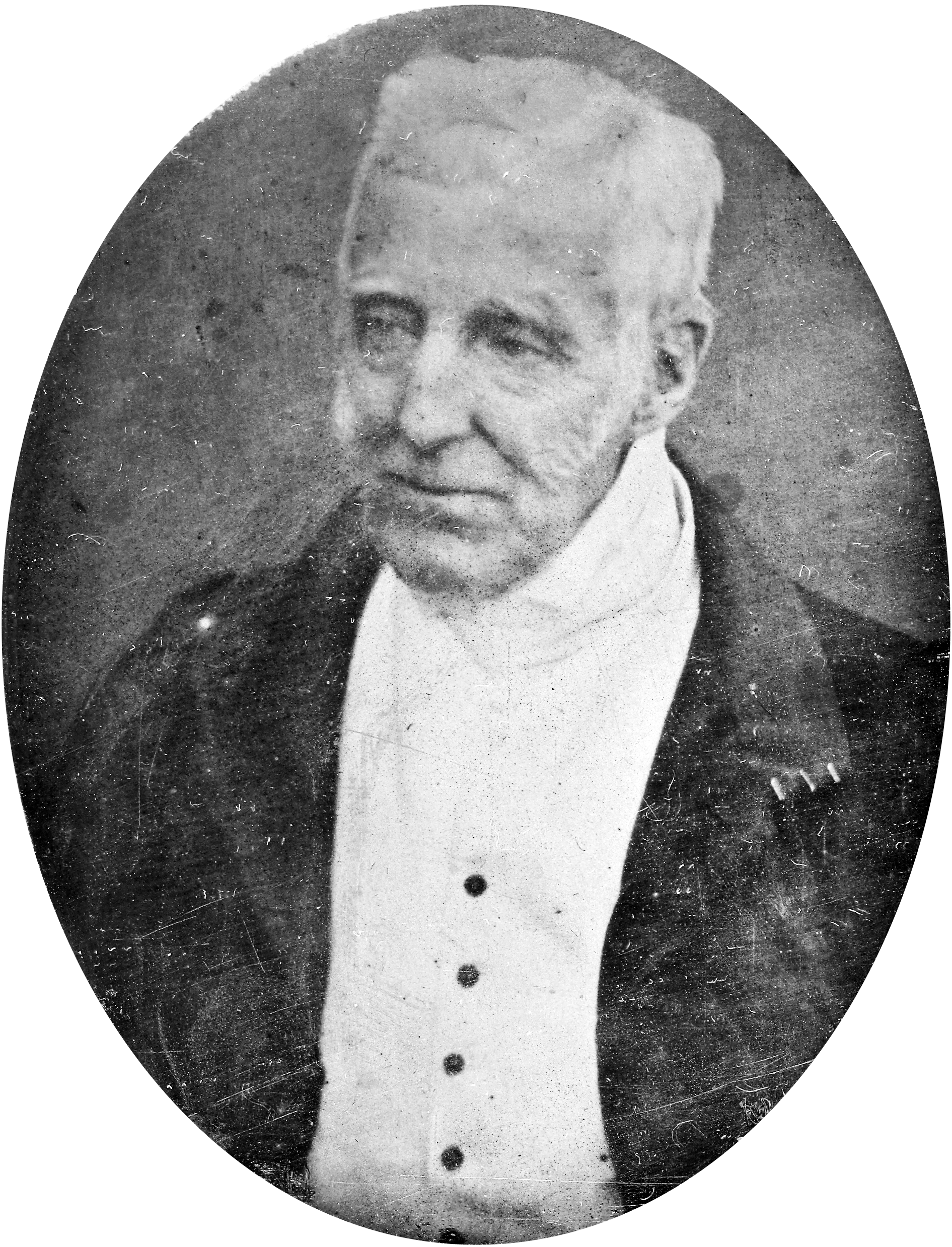
Daguerreotype of Wellington, aged 74 or 75, by Antoine Claudet, 1844. This is the earliest photograph known to have been taken of anyone who had been the British prime minister.

The Wellington caretaker ministry was the government of the United Kingdom led by the Duke of Wellington from 17 November to 9 December 1834. It followed the First Melbourne ministry and was succeeded by the First Peel ministry. During the caretaker government there was no Cabinet. Wellington served simultaneously as prime minister, Leader of the House of Lords and the only secretary of state, while most other offices were held in commission.

== List of ministers ==
During the caretaker government there was no Cabinet.

Ministers
Office	Name	Date
Prime Minister; Leader of the House of Lords; Secretary of State	Arthur Wellesley, 1st Duke of Wellington	17 November 1834 – 9 December 1834
Lord Chancellor	John Copley, 1st Baron Lyndhurst	21 November 1834
Chancellor of the Exchequer (interim)	Thomas Denman, 1st Baron Denman	15 November 1834
Lords Commissioners of the Treasury	Arthur Wellesley, 1st Duke of Wellington	21 November 1834
Lords Commissioners of the Treasury	James St Clair-Erskine, 2nd Earl of Rosslyn	21 November 1834
Lords Commissioners of the Treasury	Edward Law, 2nd Baron Ellenborough	21 November 1834
Lords Commissioners of the Treasury	William Wellesley-Pole, 1st Baron Maryborough	21 November 1834
Lords Commissioners of the Treasury	Sir John Beckett, 2nd Baronet	21 November 1834
Lords Commissioners of the Treasury	Joseph Planta	21 November 1834

=== Notes ===
- Wellington was the only Secretary of State.
- As no separate Chancellor of the Exchequer had been appointed, Denman held the post pro tempore by virtue of being Lord Chief Justice.
- Most offices were in commission.

Preceded by First Melbourne ministry	Government of the United Kingdom; 1834	Succeeded by First Peel ministry
