= Charles Kendal Bushe =

Irish lawyer and judge (1767–1843)

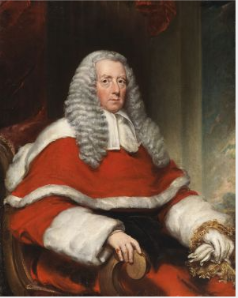
- 1828 portrait by Martin Cregan

Lord Chief Justice of the King's Bench for Ireland
- In office 1822–1841

Solicitor-General for Ireland
- In office 1805–1822

Personal details
- Born: 1767
- Died: 10 July 1843 (aged 75–76)

Charles Kendal Bushe (1767 – 10 July 1843) was an Irish lawyer and judge. Known as "silver-tongued Bushe" because of his eloquence, he was Solicitor-General for Ireland from 1805 to 1822 and Lord Chief Justice of the King's Bench for Ireland from 1822 to 1841.

== Background and education ==
Bushe was born at Kilmurry House, near Thomastown, County Kilkenny, the only son of the Reverend Thomas Bushe, rector of Mitchelstown, and his wife Katherine Doyle, daughter of Charles Doyle of Bramblestown, near Gowran. Kilmurry House had been built by the Bushe family in the 1690s; his father was forced to sell it to pay his debts, but Charles was able to repurchase it in 1814. He went to the celebrated Quaker academy, Shackleton's School in Ballitore, County Kildare, then graduated from the Trinity College Dublin, where his eloquence had made him a star of the College Historical Society, and was called to the Bar in 1790.

== Legal and judicial career ==
Bushe was a member of the Irish Parliament for Callan from 1796 to 1799, and for Donegal Borough from 1799 to 1800. He was Escheator of Leinster in 1799; by this time the office was a sinecure. He was vehemently opposed to the Act of Union 1800, referring emotionally to Britain's subjection of Ireland as "six hundred years of uniform oppression and injustice", a phrase which quickly became a proverb. Although he had refused an offer of a place on the Bench as a bribe for supporting the Union, cynics noted that his staunch opposition to the Union did not prevent him accepting high office under the British Crown afterwards. He was appointed Solicitor-General for Ireland in 1805 and held the office for 17 years until in 1822 he was appointed Lord Chief Justice of the King's Bench for Ireland (although only after William Saurin, the equally long-serving Attorney-General, had refused the position). He retired in 1841.

As an advocate "silver-tongued Bushe" was legendary for his eloquence, and as a politician, he was admired by his English contemporaries like Sir Robert Peel and Lord Brougham. As a judge, according to Elrington Ball, he did not live up to expectations, although, if not an outstanding judge, he was an impressive and dignified one. As a statesman he was often accused of double-dealing: having opposed the Act of Union, he had few scruples about accepting office under the new regime; and while himself supporting Catholic Emancipation, he prosecuted members of the Catholic Association for sedition, merely for advocating the same cause.

In Dublin, he was a member of Daly's Club.

== Family ==
In 1793, Bushe married Anne (Nancy) Crampton (died 1857), daughter of John Crampton of Dublin and Anne Verner, and sister of Sir Philip Crampton, 1st Baronet, President of the Royal College of Physicians of Ireland. They had ten children:

- John Thomas (1794–1870) married Lady Louisa Hare, daughter of William Hare, 1st Earl of Listowel, and his first wife, Mary Wrixon, only daughter of Henry Wrixon.
- Elizabeth, died unmarried
- Charlotte (1797–1848), married John Plunket, 3rd Baron Plunket and was the mother of William Plunket, 4th Baron Plunket, Church of Ireland Archbishop of Dublin, and David Plunket, 1st Baron Rathmore.
- Rev. Charles (1800–1866), Church of Ireland clergyman who became rector of Castlehaven, County Cork, was by his second wife Emmeline Coghill the father of another eminent barrister, Seymour Coghill Bushe.
- Thomas Francis (1801–1865), married Alicia Jane Phillips
- Anna Maria (1802–1848), married in 1819 as his second wife of Sir Josiah Coghill Coghill, 3rd Baronet: her stepdaughter Emmeline married Anna Maria's brother Charles as his second wife.
- Arthur (1803–1876), married firstly in 1827 Mary Anne Christian, married secondly in 1853 Marion Martin
- Katherine (1805–1879), married Michael Charles Fox, son of his judicial colleague Luke Fox and Anne Annesley, a niece of Charles Loftus, 1st Marquess of Ely
- Maria Belissa (1809–1908), married Rev. John Harris, rector of Shercock, Co. Cavan
- Henrietta Sarah (1812–1887), married in 1834 Robert Fergusson Franks, mother of eminent physician Sir Kendal Matthew St. John Franks and solicitor Sir John Hamilton Franks

=== Descendants ===
Dunbar Barton, a leading Irish High Court judge of the early 1900s, was descended from Bushe.

Joscelyn Plunket Bushe-Fox was the grandson of his daughter Katherine.

Seymour Coghill Bushe (1853–1922) was a leading barrister whose career in Ireland was largely destroyed by his role as co-respondent in a much publicised criminal conversation case, followed by divorce, Brooke v Brooke (1886), and thereafter largely confined his legal practice to England. He was the judge's grandson, his parents being the Reverend Charles Bushe and his second wife Emmeline Coghill, daughter of Sir Josiah Coghill Coghill, 3rd Baronet of the Coghill Baronets and his first wife Sophia Dodson. He married Lady Kathleen Maude, daughter of Cornwallis Maude, 1st Earl de Montalt and Clementina Fleeming, and the defendant in Brooke v. Brooke, after her divorce from her first husband, Gerald Brooke. She died in 1939.

Bushe was the great-grandfather of the writing duo Somerville and Ross, who were second cousins.

Parliament of Ireland
Preceded by William Meeke; Hon. Francis Mathew	Member of Parliament for Callan; 1796–1799; With: William Meeke 1796–1797; Patrick Welch 1797–1799	Succeeded by Patrick Welch; James Savage
Preceded by Hugh O'Donnell; William Cusack-Smith	Member of Parliament for Donegal Borough; 1799–1801; With: William Cusack-Smith	Constituency abolished
Political offices
Preceded by William Plunket	Solicitor-General for Ireland; 1805–1822	Succeeded by Henry Joy
Preceded by William Downes	Lord Chief Justice of the King's Bench for Ireland; 1822–1841	Succeeded by Edward Pennefather
