= Solicitor-General for Ireland =

Irish government position

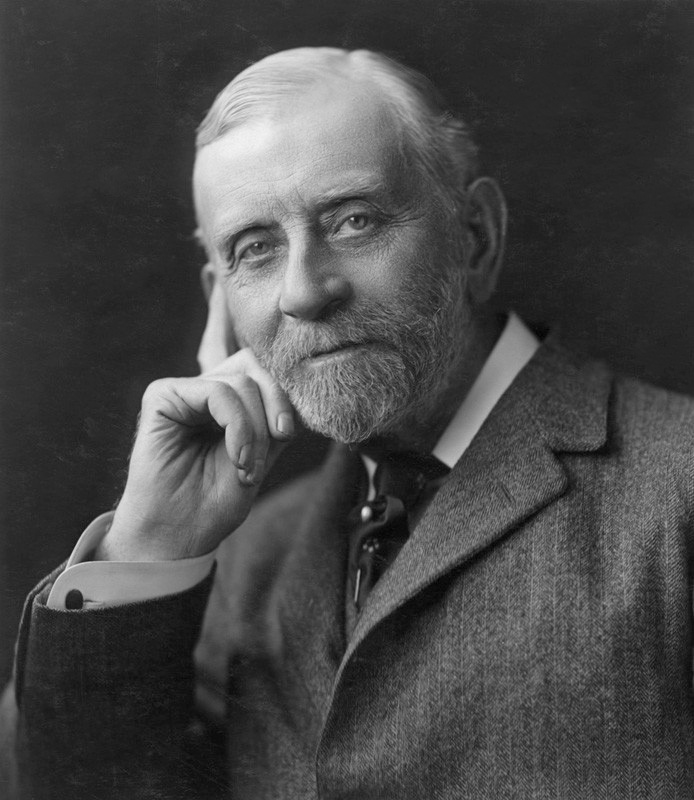
Lord Atkinson, Solicitor-General for Ireland from 1890 to 1892

The Solicitor-General for Ireland was the holder of an Irish and then (from the Act of Union 1800) United Kingdom government office. The holder was a deputy to the Attorney-General for Ireland, and advised the Crown on Irish legal matters. On rare occasions, there was also a Deputy Attorney-General, who was distinct from the Solicitor-General. At least two holders of the office, Patrick Barnewall (1534–1550) and Sir Roger Wilbraham (1586–1603), played a leading role in Government, although in Barnewall's case, this may be partly because he, was also King's Serjeant. As with the Solicitor General for England and Wales, the Solicitor-General for Ireland was usually a barrister rather than a solicitor.

The first record of a Solicitor General is in 1511, although the office may be older than that as the records are incomplete; on the other hand, the equivalent English office is a relatively recent creation, dating from 1461. Early Solicitors almost always held the like of Serjeant-at-law. For some forty years in the sixteenth century a Principal Solicitor for Ireland shared the duties of the office: confusingly both were referred to as "the Solicitor". The Principal Solicitor might also be a Serjeant-at-law, as Richard Finglas was.

Elizabeth I thought poorly of most of her Irish-born Law Officers (there were a few exceptions like James Dowdall) and Richard Finglas, and from 1584 onwards there was a practice, which lasted for several decades, of appointing English-born lawyers as Solicitor General. At least one of them, Sir Roger Wilbraham (in office 1586–1603), was a key figure in the Dublin government for many years.

Unlike the Attorney General, the Solicitor was not, as a rule, a member of the Privy Council of Ireland, although he might be summoned by the council to advise it.

With the establishment of the Irish Free State in 1922, the duties of both the Attorney General and Solicitor General for Ireland were taken over by the Attorney General of Ireland, and the office of Solicitor General was abolished, apparently as an economy measure. This led to complaints for many years about the undue burden of work which was placed on the Attorney General, whose office was seriously understaffed until the 1930s.

== Solicitors-General for Ireland (1511–1922) ==
=== 16th century ===
- Thomas Rochfort: appointed 1511
- Thomas Luttrell: 9 September 1532 – 1534
- Patrick Barnewall: 17 October 1534 – 1550
- John Bathe: 16 October 1550 – 1554
- James Dowdall: 20 July 1554 – 1565
- Nicholas Nugent: 17 April 1565 – 1574
- Richard Bellings: February 1574 – 1584
- Jesse Smythes: 7 July 1584 – 1586
- Roger Wilbraham: 11 February 1586 – 1603

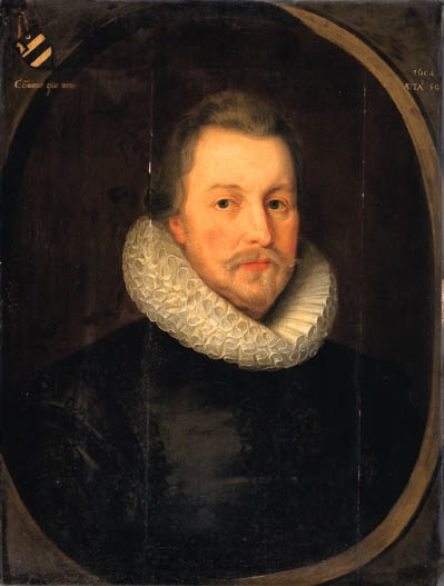
Sir Roger Wilbraham, Solicitor-General for Ireland 1586-1603

=== 17th century ===
- Sir John Davies: 18 September 1603 – 1606
- Sir Robert Jacobe: 19 April 1606 – 1618
- Sir Richard Bolton: 31 December 1618 – 1622
- Sir Edward Bolton: 5 December 1622 – 1640
- Sir William Sambach: 8 June 1640 – ?

Office vacant c.1640-1657

- William Ellice: 1657 – 1658 (Commonwealth)
- Robert Shapcote: 1658 – 1660 (Commonwealth)
- Sir John Temple: 10 July 1660 – 1689
- Sir Theobald Butler: 1689 – 25 July 1689
- Sir Richard Levinge, 1st Baronet 3 November 1689 – 1695
- Alan Brodrick: 10 May 1695 – 1704

=== 18th century ===
- Sir Richard Levinge, 1st Baronet: 4 April 1704 – 1709
- John Forster: 8 September 1709 – 24 December 1709
- William Whitshed: 24 December 1709 – 1711
- Francis Bernard: 4 June 1711 – 1714
- John Rogerson: 8 November 1714 – 14 May 1720
- Thomas Marlay: 13 October 1720 – 1727
- Robert Jocelyn: 5 April 1727 – 29 September 1730
- John Bowes: 29 September 1730 – 3 September 1739
- St George Caulfeild: 24 September 1739 – 23 December 1741
- Warden Flood: 24 December 1741 – 27 August 1751
- Philip Tisdall: 27 August 1751 – 31 July 1760
- John Gore: 31 July 1760 – 24 August 1764
- Marcus Paterson: 29 August 1764 – 18 June 1770
- Godfrey Lill: 18 June 1770 – 1774
- John Scott: 13 July 1774 – 17 October 1777
- Robert Hellen: 31 October 1777 – 1779
- Hugh Carleton: 7 April 1779 – 30 April 1787
- Arthur Wolfe: 1 May 1787 – 16 July 1789
- John Toler: 16 July 1789 – 26 June 1798
- John Stewart: 26 June 1798 – 9 December 1799

=== 19th century ===
- William Cusack-Smith: 6 December 1800 – 1801
- James McClelland: 17 December 1801 – 1803
- William Conynham Plunket: 22 October 1803 – 15 October 1805
- Charles Kendal Bushe: 15 October 1805 – 14 February 1822
- Henry Joy: 20 February 1822 – 18 June 1827
- John Doherty: 18 June 1827 – 23 December 1830
- Philip Cecil Crampton: 23 December 1830 – 21 October 1834
- Michael O'Loghlen: 21 October 1834 – 1834
- Edward Pennefather: 27 January 1835 – 1835
- Michael O'Loghlen: 29 April 1835 – 1835
- John Richards: 21 September 1835 – 10 November 1836
- Stephen Woulfe: 10 November 1836 – 3 February 1837
- Maziere Brady: 3 February 1837 – February 1839
- David Richard Pigot: 11 February 1839 – 14 August 1840
- Richard Moore: 14 August 1840 – 1841
- Edward Pennefather 21 September 1841 – 1841
- Joseph Devonsher Jackson: 10 November 1841 – 9 September 1842
- Thomas Cusack-Smith: 21 September 1842 – 1 November 1842
- Richard Wilson Greene: 1 November 1842 – 2 February 1846
- Abraham Brewster: 2 February 1846 – June 1846
- James Henry Monahan: 16 July 1846 – 24 December 1847
- John Hatchell: 24 December 1847 – 23 September 1850
- Henry George Hughes: 26 September 1850 – February 1852
- James Whiteside: February 1852 – December 1852
- William Keogh: April 1853 – March 1855
- John FitzGerald: March 1855 – March 1856
- Jonathan Christian: March 1856 – February 1858
- Henry George Hughes: February 1858 – 1858
- Edmund Hayes: 1858 – June 1859
- John George: June 1859 – 1859
- Rickard Deasy: 1859 – February 1860
- Thomas O'Hagan: February 1860 – 1861
- James Anthony Lawson: 1861 – 1865
- Edward Sullivan: 1865 – June 1866
- Michael Morris: 3 August 1866 – 1 November 1866
- Hedges Eyre Chatterton: 8 November 1866 – 1867
- Robert Warren: 1867 – 1867
- Michael Harrison: 1867 – 1868
- John Thomas Ball: 1868 – 1868
- Henry Ormsby: 1868 – 1868
- Charles Robert Barry: 12 December 1868 – 26 January 1870
- Richard Dowse: 14 February 1870 – 13 January 1872
- Christopher Palles: 6 February 1872 – 5 November 1872
- Hugh Law: 18 November 1872 – February 1874
- Henry Ormsby: 12 March 1874 – 21 January 1875
- Hon. David Plunket: 29 January 1875 – 1877
- Gerald FitzGibbon: 3 March 1877 – 1878
- Hugh Holmes: 14 December 1878 – April 1880
- William Moore Johnson: 24 May 1880 – 17 November 1881
- Andrew Porter: 18 November 1881 – 3 January 1883
- John Naish: 9 January 1883 – 19 December 1883
- Samuel Walker: 19 December 1883 – 1885
- The MacDermot: 1885 – June 1885
- John Monroe: 3 July 1885 – November 1885
- John George Gibson: 1885 – January 1886
- The MacDermot: February 1886 – July 1886
- John George Gibson: August 1886 – 1887
- Peter O'Brien: 1887 – 1888
- Dodgson Hamilton Madden: 1888 – 1890
- John Atkinson: 1890 – 1892
- Edward Carson: June 1892 – August 1892
- Charles Hare Hemphill: August 1892 – 1895
- William Kenny: 28 August 1895 – 1898
- Sir Dunbar Barton: 1898 – 1900

=== 20th century ===
- George Wright: 30 January 1900 – 1901
- James Campbell: October 1901 – 1905
- Redmond Barry: 20 December 1905 – 2 December 1909
- Charles O'Connor: 2 December 1909 – 26 September 1911
- Ignatius O'Brien: 19 October 1911 – 24 June 1912
- Thomas Molony: 24 June 1912 – 10 April 1913
- John Moriarty: 25 April 1913 – 20 June 1913
- Jonathan Pim: 20 June 1913 – 1 July 1914
- James O'Connor: 1 July 1914 – 8 January 1917
- James Chambers: 19 March 1917 – June 1917
- Arthur Samuels: 12 September 1917 – 7 April 1918
- John Blake Powell: 7 April 1918 – 1918
- Denis Henry: 27 November 1918 – 6 July 1919
- Daniel Martin Wilson: 6 July 1919 – June 1921
- Thomas Watters Brown: 12 June 1921 – 5 August 1921
- Office abolished thereafter

== Principal Solicitors for Ireland (1537–1574) ==
- Walter Cowley: 7 September 1537 – 1546
- John Bathe: 7 February 1546 – 1550
- Richard Finglas: 17 October 1550 – 1574
- James Dowdall: 20 July 1554 – 1565
- Lucas Dillon 1565 – 1566
- John Bathe (cousin of the earlier John Bathe): 20 October 1570 – 1574
