= Norrington =

Norrington is a surname. Notable people with the surname include:

- Arthur Lionel Pugh Norrington (1899–1982), English publisher
- Humphrey Thomas Norrington, British banker
- Roger Norrington (1934–2025), British conductor
- Stephen Norrington (born 1964), English film director

== Fictional characters ==
- James Norrington, a character in the Pirates of the Caribbean films

== See also ==
- Norrington Manor, Alvediston, Wiltshire, England
- Norrington Table, an annual ranking of the colleges of the University of Oxford, England, refined by Arthur Norrington
