= Maud Cattell =

- Born: Fanny Maud Cattell; 23 April 1857; Sheldon, West Midlands, England
- Died: 25 June 1947 (aged 90); Sheldon, West Midlands, England
- Occupations: deaconess, hospital administrator
- Known for: Matron of a hospital
- Relatives: Clara Cattell (sister)

Maud Cattell (23 April 1857 – 25 June 1947) was a British nurse who ran the Mildmay Mission Hospital in London. She was assisted by her sister Clara Cattell.

== Life ==
Cattell was born in Sheldon, West Midlands in 1857. Her parents were Fanny Mary (born Pate) and John Cattell and she was the second of their ten children. One of her sisters Emma Maria was disabled after an accident with a donkey and looking after her was one of the ways that she gained an interest and learnt about nursing. Maud's early education is thought to be by governesses. Another sister Clara Jane Cattell was three years younger than her and she would train in Liverpool and Switzerland before becoming a deaconess at Mildmay Mission.

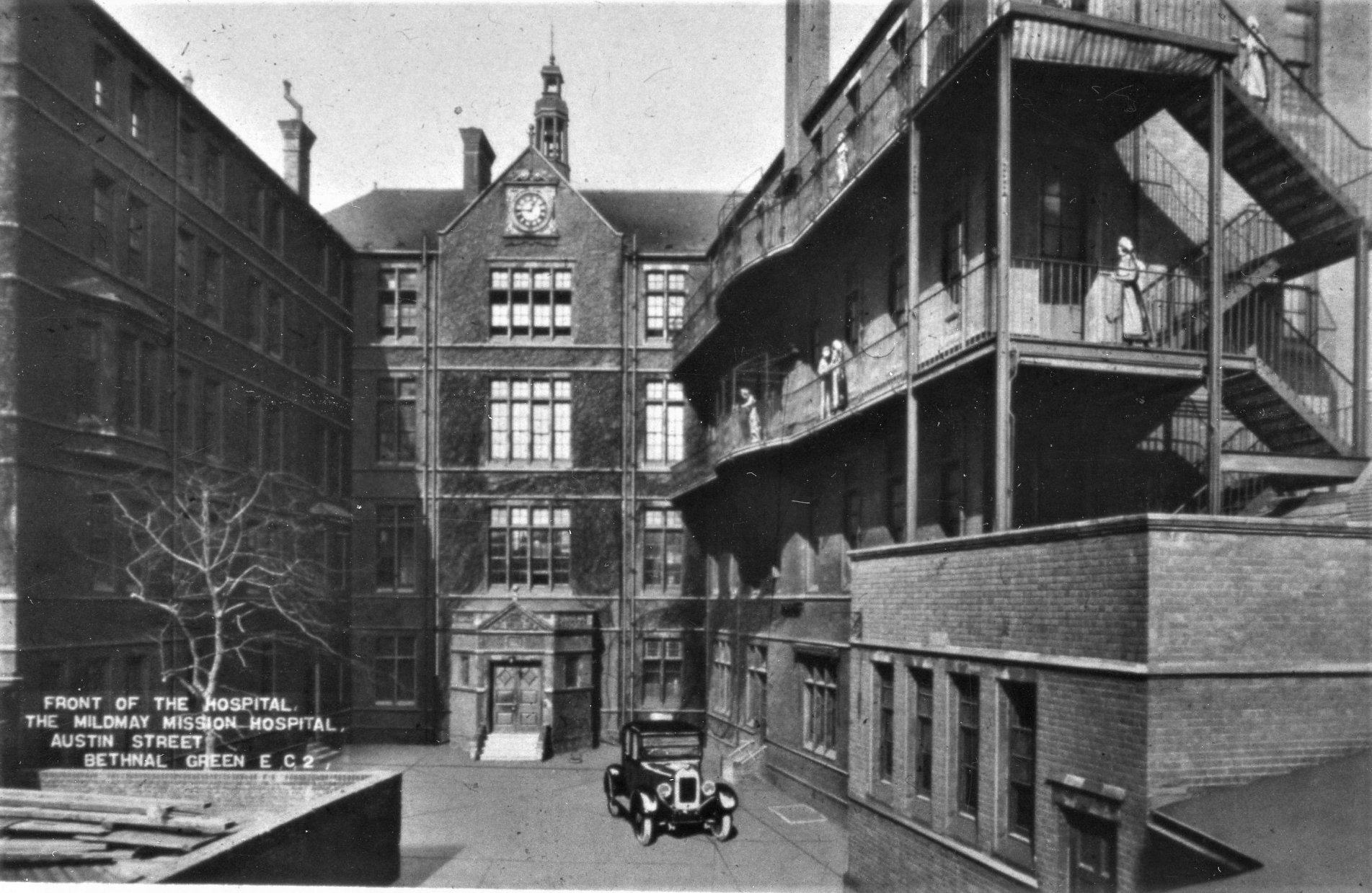
Mildmay Mission Hospital in 1892

The Mildmay Mission Hospital had been opened by Catherine Pennefather in 1877. It was based at Central Hall, close to the Royal London Hospital. Cattell joined the mission in 1886 and was trained by Pennefather. Her sister, Clara, also worked at the hospital and was promoted to lead the men's ward. Clara left in 1907 to look after their parents.

During the first world war Maud had a challenging time running the hospital. In 1916, the hospital's drains were so poor that the hospital had to close. Cattell was able to gain support and assistance from the Elizabeth Garrett Anderson Hospital and it reopened in part. In 1917 they suddenly received 36 casualties due to enemy bombing. Her workload wasn't helped when the Mildmay mission closed its admin section that year. The following year she had to run the hospital and undertake all the cooking for over eight weeks.

She eventually retired when she realised that a younger person was required to run the hospital and she took time to train Dora Woodhouse who became her replacement in August 1919. She returned to her father and her sisters in Sheldon and she lived with Clara, Emma and Hannah May (Kemp). It was Hannah May who nursed her.

== Death and legacy ==
Cattell died in 1946 in the Sheldon area of Birmingham.

The hospital she had led was meant to be closed in 1988 but Helen Taylor Thompson led the campaign to keep it open and it became Europe's first AIDS hospital.
