= William Pennefather =

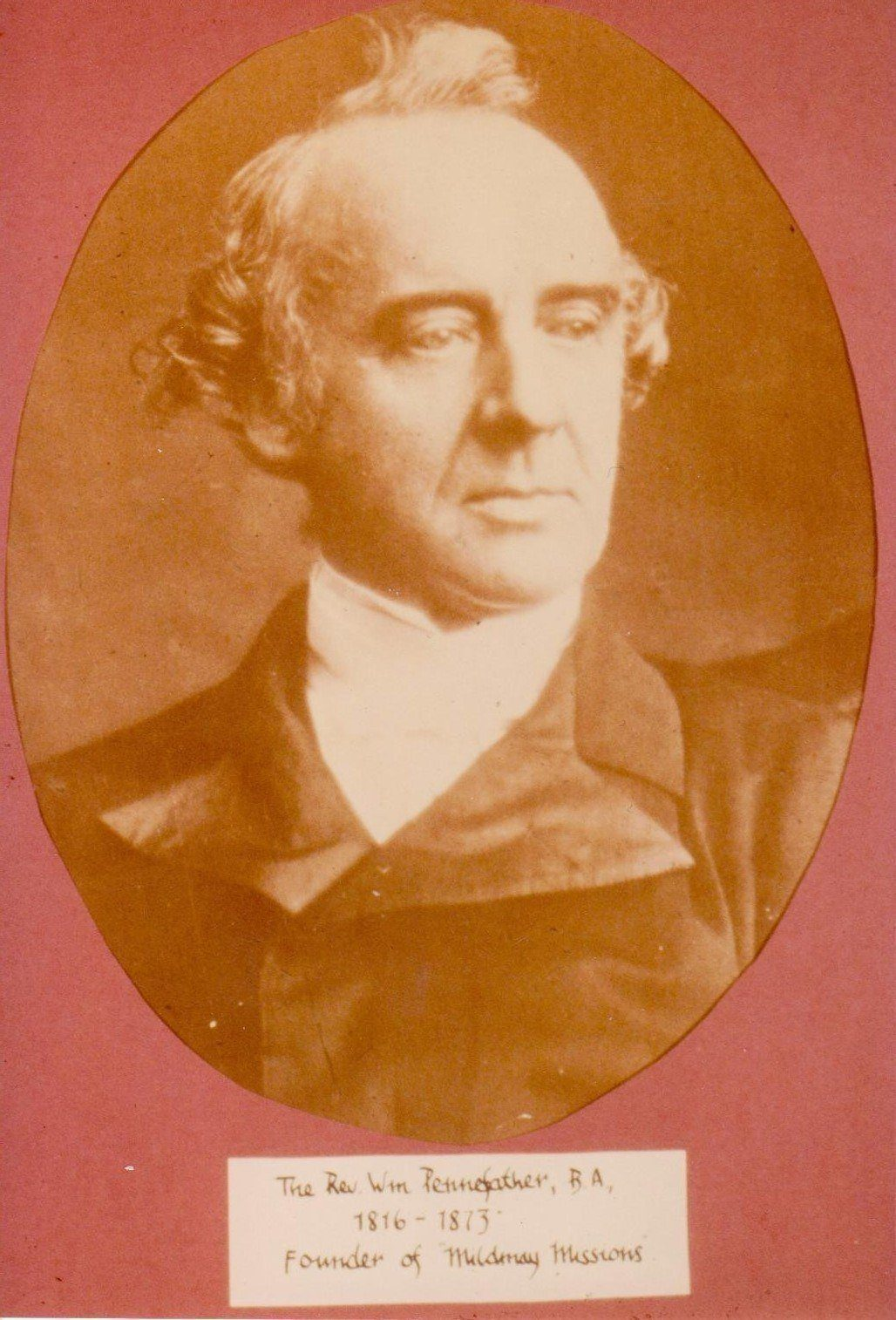
- Born: 5 February 1816; Dublin
- Died: 30 April 1873 (aged 57); London
- Occupation: cleric
- Known for: missionary work with Catherine Pennefather
- Spouse: Catherine Pennefather

William Pennefather (1816–1873) was an Irish Anglican cleric who spent most of his adult life in England. He was famous for his hymns and sermons, and also for missionary work with his wife Catherine Pennefather. Catherine founded several projects in his name in the twenty years after his death.

== Early life ==
He was born in Dublin, youngest son of the highly respected High Court judge Richard Pennefather, and his wife Jane Bennet. His father came from a long established family of landowners in County Tipperary, while his mother was the daughter of another High Court judge, John Bennett. One of his uncles was Edward Pennefather, a distinguished barrister and judge. Among his cousins was General Sir John Pennefather.

He went to school first in Dublin, then to a private school at Westbury on Trym near Bristol, where he was nicknamed "the saintly boy". Due to his chronic ill-health he was then placed with a private tutor, Mr Stephens, at Levens near Kendal, Cumbria. He entered Trinity College, Dublin in 1834 but due to his constant health problems, he did not matriculate until 1840.

== Early career ==
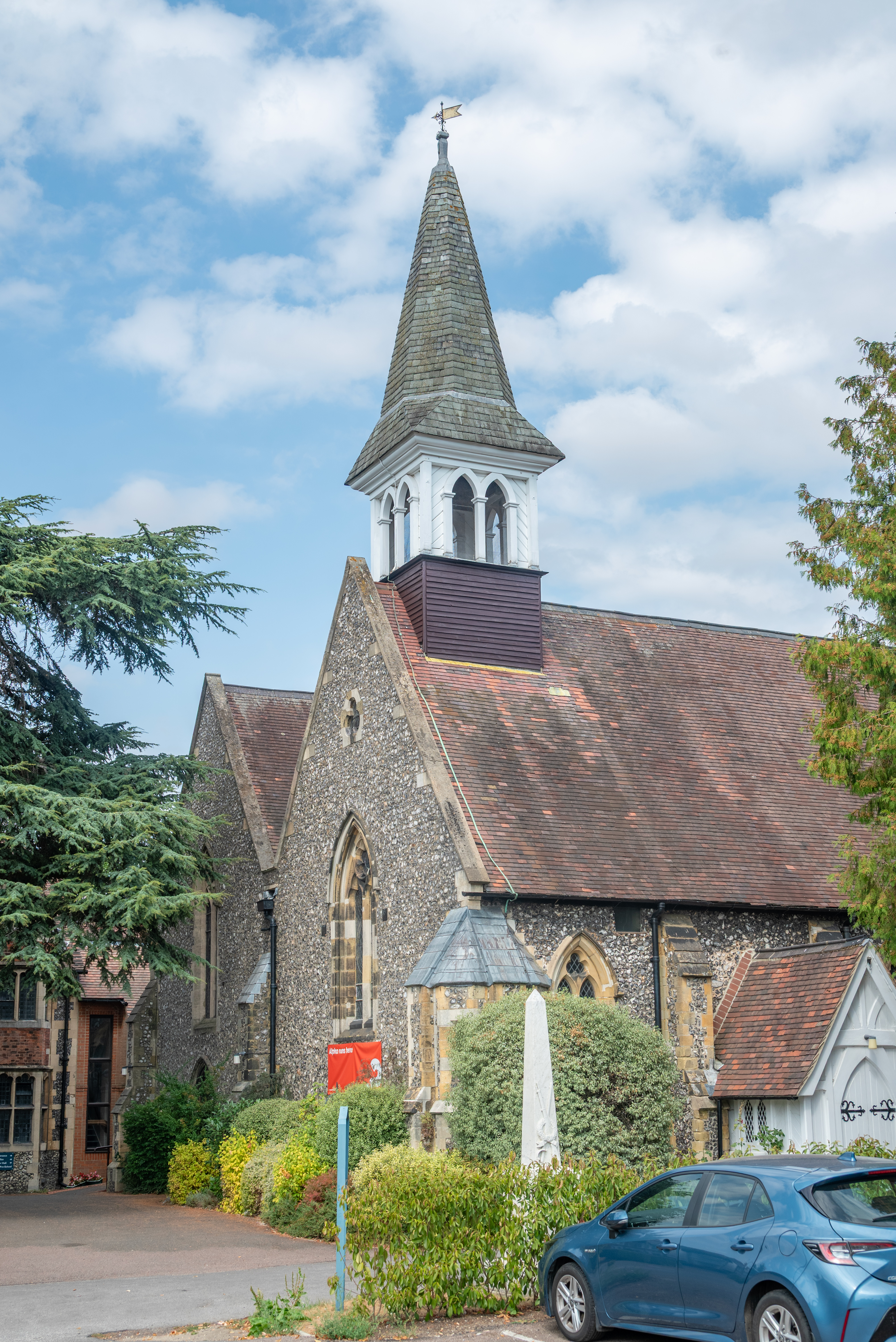
Christ Church, Barnet- William was vicar here from 1852 to 1864.

He entered holy orders in 1842. He became curate of Ballymacash, near Lisburn, in 1843 and of Mellifont the following year. During the Great Irish Famine he was noted for his charity to all those who lived in his parish, regardless of whether they were Catholics or Protestants. He then left Ireland, and spent the rest of his life working in England, mostly in or near London.

In 1848 he was appointed vicar of Holy Trinity Church, Walton, near Aylesbury. This was a very difficult parish to work in as he had no vicarage and the income was small, but he is said to have gained the trust and respect of his parishioners.

In 1852 he was transferred to Christ Church, Barnet, where he rapidly built up a considerable influence. For example, his parishioner Emma Robarts founded the Prayer Union, which decades later merged into the YWCA. His house in Barnet became a meeting place for evangelicals of all social classes and walks of life "from noblemen to farmers", and he began in 1856 a famous series of conferences on inter-denominational missionary work. Shortly before his arrival, the ancient village had been linked to central London by the opening of its railway station, making it easy to make and receive visits. There in 1860 he and his wife began to train deaconesses, a role similar to a nurse (not then a fully respectable occupation) and a social worker (then unknown). This became the Deaconess Institution, the first in the English-speaking world. When Florence Nightingale decided on a nursing career, she had to travel to Kaiserswerth to train with the deaconesses.

== Mildmay ==
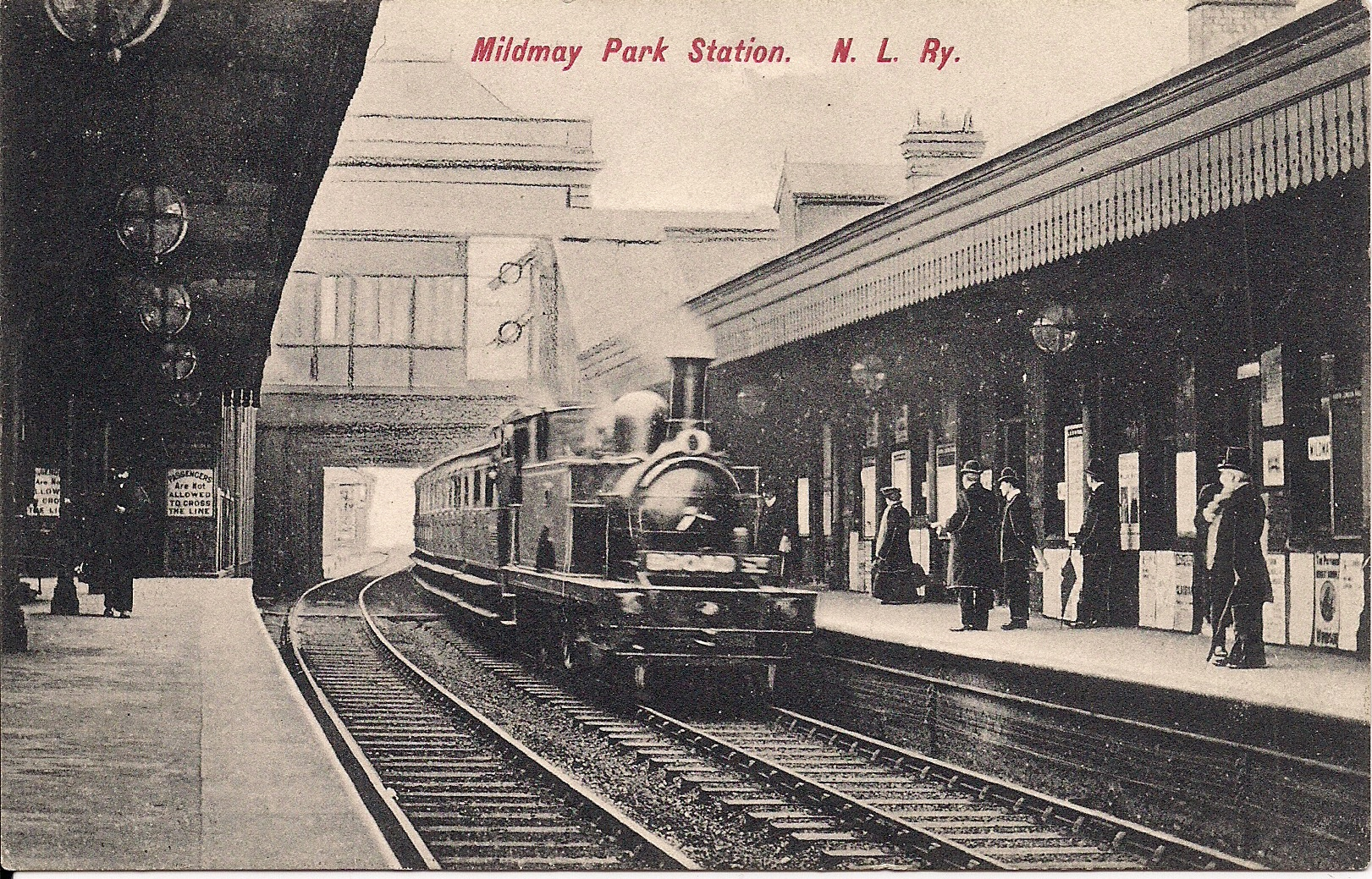
Mildmay Park railway station

In 1864 the Pennefathers were transferred to St Jude's Church, Mildmay Park in London; the annual assemblies became known as the Mildmay Conferences. Islington was undergoing great changes as Victorian housing sprawled over the ancient villages, and what had been built as desirable residences soon became overcrowded Dickensian slums. The Pennefathers rose to the occasion of the cholera epidemic of 1866, seeing it as an opportunity for domestic mission. The organisation he and his wife founded was the Mildmay Mission, judged "one of most influential home and overseas missionary organizations" in the country, "which led to founding of many other bodies".

The Deaconess Institution trained well-educated young women in theory and practice for two years at Mildmay, before sending them to full-time careers in outlying missions in London or further afield. There were "About 200 deaconesses at any one time; [their] distinctive uniform allowed them to work in roughest areas unmolested". The uniforms had been designed by Elizabeth Baxter who had joined in 1866 and had then led the institution for two years.

In 1869 the Pennefathers built a large hall at Mildmay, to host the annual conferences and to serve as the centre for several missionary organisations. The Conference Hall, abutting the south side of Newington Green, had three stories and sat up to 3000 people. It was used throughout the week by 20 organisations, and on Sunday the services were led by different denominations. Up to 600 men attended its night school. Mildmay founded or nurtured organisations such as the Dorcas Society, a charitable sewing circle; Caroline Hanbury's initiative to distribute flowers to hospitals; an orphanage training girls for domestic service; Mildmay Lads' Institute, to keep boys out of trouble; Metropolitan Free Dormitory Association, a homeless shelter involving Lord Shaftesbury; children's services, stimulated by a visit from American evangelist Edward Payson Hammond. The Railway Mission and the Young Women's Christian Association were for a time headquartered at Mildmay Mission. Mrs Pennefather brought together the Working Girls' Institute (founded 1855) to form the YWCA.

== Later life and legacy ==
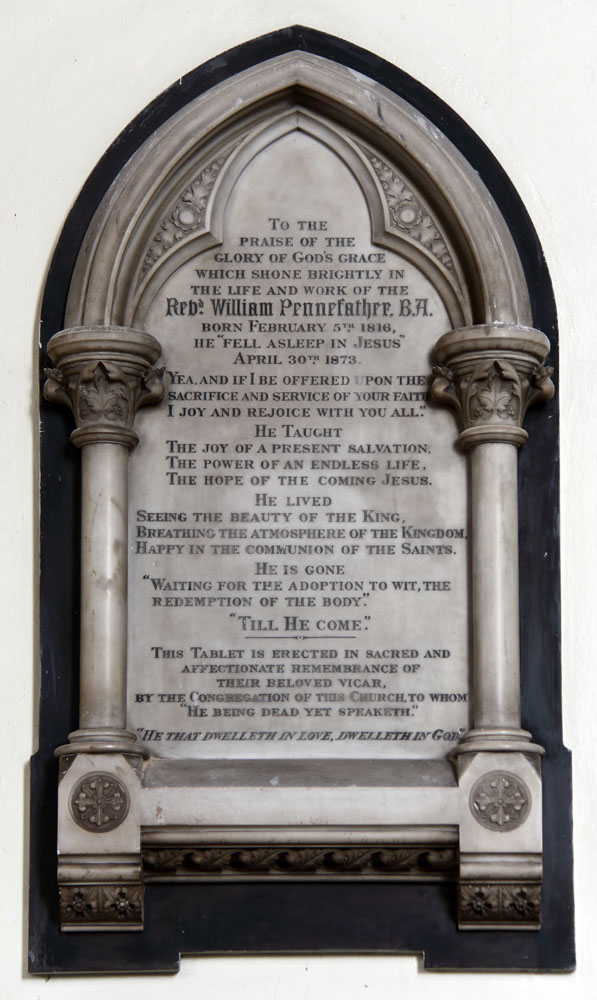
Wall monument in St Jude's, Mildmay Grove

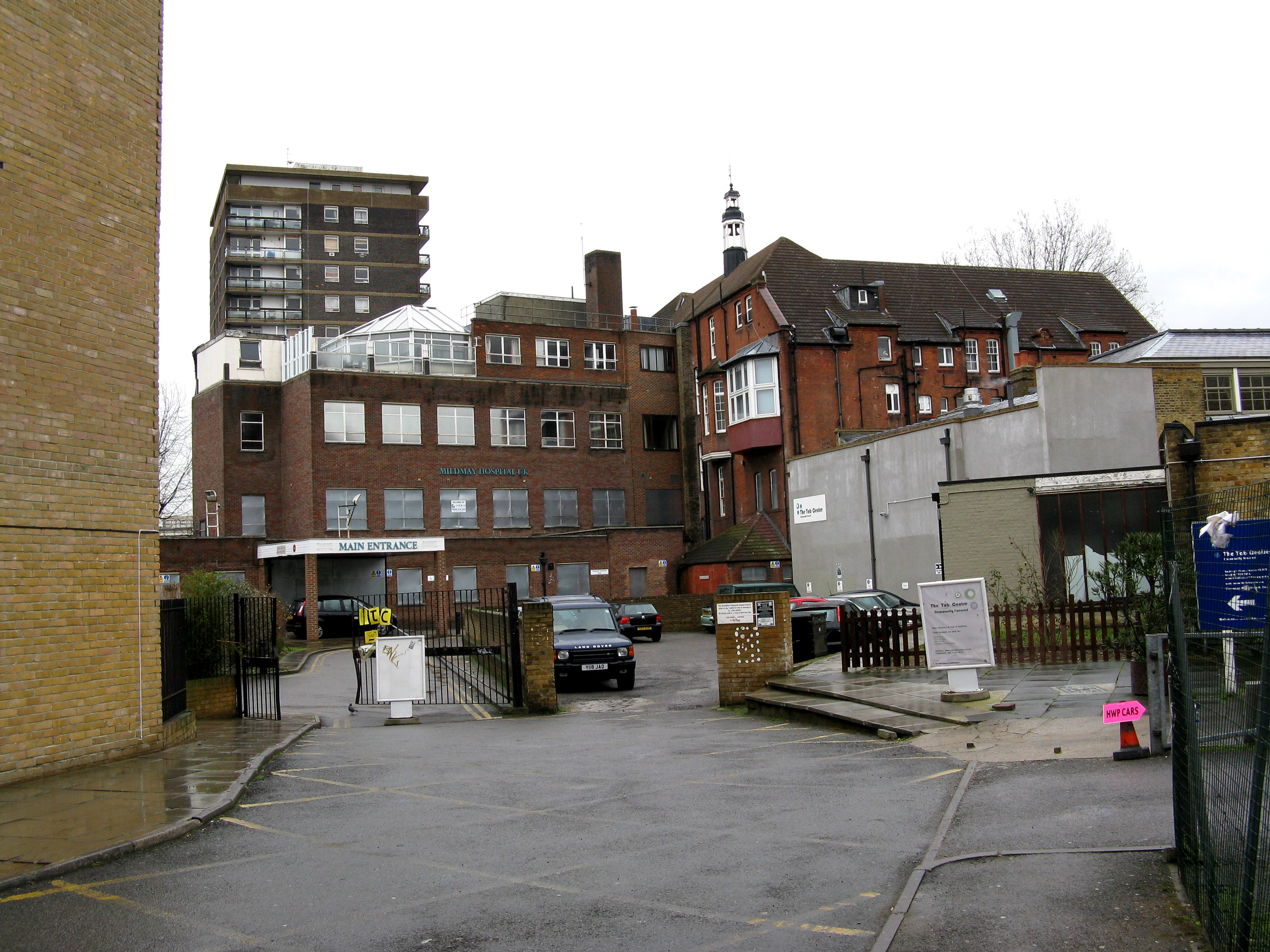
Now-demolished Mildmay Hospital building (1988–2011)

He continued to hold conferences on missionary work until his sudden death on 30 April 1873. This interdenominational initiative, and his evident piety, were precursors of the Keswick Convention.

The leader of the Church Mission Society, Eugene Stock, called him "the George Mueller of the Church of England".

He was remembered as one of the most influential mission preachers of his time. He was the author of numerous hymns, of which probably the best-known is "Jesus, Stand Among Us". He also published several books of sermons.

The Mildmay Conference Hall was demolished in the 1940s; council housing was built on its site.

Mildmay is an HIV charity which traces its roots back to Pennefather and his Church-sponsored hospital. Mildmay Mission Hospital operates in London, with related work abroad.

== Sources ==
- Buckland, Augustus Richard. "William Pennefather" Dictionary of National Biography 1885-1900 Vol. 44 p. 327
- Ball, F. Elrington. The Judges in Ireland 1221-1921 London John Murray 1926
