= Richard Pennefather (judge) =

Irish lawyer and judge

Richard Pennefather (1773–1859) was an Irish lawyer and judge of the nineteenth century, who enjoyed a reputation for legal ability and integrity. He has been highly praised, in particular, for his scrupulously impartial conduct of the politically sensitive Doneraile Conspiracy Trials of 1829. He was the elder brother of Edward Pennefather, Lord Chief Justice of Ireland.

== Family ==
He was the eldest son of William Pennefather of Knockeevan, of Darling Hill, County Tipperary, who was a member of the Irish House of Commons for Cashel, and his wife, Ellen Moore, daughter of Edward Moore, Archdeacon of Emly, and his wife Ellen Dobson. They were a junior branch of the long-established Pennefather family of Newpark, County Tipperary. The family emigrated to Ireland in about 1665. One of his brothers was Edward Pennefather, who was also a distinguished barrister and judge, and ended his career as Lord Chief Justice of Ireland. Another of his brothers, the Rev. John Pennefather, was the father of the distinguished soldier, General Sir John Pennefather.

=== Wife and children ===
He married in 1798 Jane Bennett of Cork, daughter of John Bennett, judge of the Court of King's Bench (Ireland) and his wife Jane Lovett of Liscombe, Buckinghamshire, sister of Sir Jonathan Lovett, 1st Baronet. Richard and Jane had eight children, of whom six reached adulthood and five, two sons and three daughters, survived their father. Their sons who reached adulthood were:

- the eldest, Richard (died 1849), a senior Crown official, who married Lady Emily Butler, daughter of Richard Butler, 1st Earl of Glengall and Emily Jeffries, and was the father of
  - Richard
  - Evelyn, who married Arthur Philip Stanhope, 6th Earl Stanhope.
- John (1814–1855), a barrister of the King's Inn.
- the youngest, William Pennefather (1816–1873), a noted preacher and author of several hymns; his wife, Catherine King (1817–1893), daughter of Admiral James William King, also wrote hymns.

Their daughters were:

- Dorothea (1824–1861), who married as his first wife Somerset Maxwell, 8th Baron Farnham.
- Ellen
- Susan.

Pennefather employed the architect William Tinsley, later famous for his work in the United States, to rebuild Darling Hill.

== Early career ==
He went to school in Portarlington, County Laois and then in Clonmel, graduated from Trinity College Dublin in 1794 and entered Middle Temple in 1792. He was called to the Irish Bar in 1795. He and his brother "the two Pennefathers" were among the leading practitioners in the Court of Chancery (Ireland), although Richard was generally regarded as a less gifted barrister than Edward. He became King's Counsel in 1816 and was appointed a Baron of the Court of Exchequer (Ireland) in 1821. He served on the Court for 38 years.

== Doneraile trials ==
=== Background ===
While the Crown's motives in prosecuting the Doneraile conspiracy trials have been questioned, many historians accept that there was a genuine conspiracy and that it formed part of a wider pattern of agrarian disturbance, which had begun with the Whiteboys organisation in the previous century. There is credible evidence of a plot to murder several unpopular landlords in the Doneraile area, notably Michael Creagh, the former High Sheriff of County Cork. In January 1829 a local doctor, John Norcott, was shot at, almost certainly by mistake for Michael Creagh. Several local landlords expressed their fears to the authorities that an uprising was imminent, and in April, two informers, Patrick Daly and his cousin Owen, came forward with evidence that at a fair in Rathclare, near Buttevant, a few days earlier, a number of men had entered a sworn agreement to kill several local landlords, including Michael Creagh. On foot of their evidence, 21 men were arrested and sent for trial. A Special Commission was set up to try them consisting of Pennefather and Mr. Justice Torrens, with John Doherty, the Solicitor General for Ireland, prosecuting. It sat in Cork City in October 1829.

How much truth there was in the Dalys' testimony is difficult to determine. As Geoghegan remarks, it is likely that a few of the accused were guilty at least of the attack on Norcott, but that most of them were innocent of any crime. The danger, as in most conspiracy trials, was that no distinction would be made between the innocent and the guilty. That a major miscarriage of justice was averted owes a good deal to the eloquence of Daniel O'Connell but also to the integrity of the judges, Torrens and Pennefather.

=== The course of the Trials ===
On 23 October 1829 four of the accused – John Leary, James Roche, James McGrath and William Shine – were tried. No criticism has been made of the judges' conduct of the trial, but partly because they lacked defence counsel of the skill of O'Connell, all were found guilty and sentenced to death (their sentences were later commuted to transportation).

In desperation, William Burke, a brother of John Burke, one of the accused, raised 100 guineas and rushed to O'Connell's home, Derrynane, to plead with him to take the case. O'Connell who had previously refused to take the brief, now accepted it and started out for Cork immediately. He arrived in Court just as the second trial – of Edmund Connors, Michael Wallace, Patrick Lynch and Timothy Barrett- was beginning. Pennefather- an old friend and colleague from the Munster Circuit- allowed O'Connell to appear for the defence and, to the annoyance of the prosecution, even allowed him to eat his breakfast in Court. O'Connell subjected the Crown's witnesses, in particular Patrick Daly, to merciless cross-examination and pointed to numerous inconsistencies in their evidence.

The jury deliberated for so long that it became known as the "40-hour jury". Eventually, it acquitted Timothy Barrett but could not agree on a verdict in the other 3 cases.

=== Judge's ruling ===
On 29 October, John Burke and William Shine stood trial. At the start of their trial, Pennefather called O'Connell to the Bench and handed him a document. It turned out to be Patrick Daly's original sworn deposition about the alleged conspiracy, which was utterly inconsistent with the testimony that he had given at the trials. Pennefather, who had sent to Doneraile for the original deposition, realised that it was evidence the defence must see. He then charged the jury in such a manner that a verdict of not guilty was inevitable. The Solicitor General stated that no further trials would take place, and the Special Commission came to an end.

== Later life ==
Pennefather remained on the Bench until he was 86; he was held in such high esteem that the Bar resisted any suggestion that he should be asked to retire, even after he went blind. An inquiry by the House of Commons in 1856 into the alleged incapacity of a number of Irish High Court judges pointed to Pennefather's age and physical disabilities, but the Bar responded with so eloquent a tribute to his ability that the matter was dropped. He eventually retired a few months before his death. He died rather suddenly at his home at Knockeevan, County Tipperary, and was buried in Cahir.

== Character ==
Elrington Ball called him a model of "what is distinguished in professional, and admirable in private life". Geoghegan calls him "one of the finest judges of the period and a model of integrity". The Dictionary of National Biography describes him as a "sound, able, and upright judge, skilled in the digestion and elucidation of evidence, courteous in his bearing and in criminal cases lenient". He was well versed in every branch of jurisprudence; and yet curiously, he was a judge who left behind very few judgments of any importance.

His conduct of the Doneraile Trials, and in particular his ruling that the prosecution have an absolute duty to disclose all relevant evidence to the accused, was cited with approval by the Supreme Court of Ireland in 2007.
