= Mildmay Mission Hospital =

- Registered Charity Number: 292058
- Location in Tower Hamlets

Geography
- Location: 19 Tabernacle Gardens, London, United Kingdom
- Coordinates: 51°31′40″N 0°04′33″W

Organisation
- Care system: Charitable
- Type: Specialist
- Affiliated university: None
- Patron: See below

Services
- Emergency department: No Accident & Emergency
- Beds: 27
- Speciality: HIV/AIDS

History
- Founded: 1892 (first hospital); 1988 (reopened); 2014 (new premises)
- Closed: 1916; 1984

Links
- Website: www.mildmay.nhs.uk
- Lists: Hospitals in the United Kingdom

Mildmay Mission Hospital is a specialist voluntary charitable hospital and rehabilitation centre in Bethnal Green located in the London Borough of Tower Hamlets and is close to Shoreditch in the London Borough of Hackney. It is the only hospital in the United Kingdom specialising in the care of HIV/AIDS and related conditions, and the only one in Europe specialising in the treatment and rehabilitation of HIV-associated neurocognitive disorders.

The first Mildmay Hospital was established in 1877 by Catherine Pennefather and a group of deaconesses of the Mildmay Mission in a warehouse near Shoreditch Church. In 1892 it moved to purpose-built premises on Austin Street, Bethnal Green, to serve the population of the nearby Old Nichol rookery and, later, the Boundary Estate. It was incorporated into the National Health Service (NHS) in 1948 and continued to operate as a cottage hospital until 1982, when it was closed as part of a broader administrative reorganisation of the NHS. After extensive campaigning by Helen Taylor Thompson and others, in 1985 Mildmay was reopened, first as a nursing home and then as an AIDS hospice; in 1988, it resumed operations in new premises at Tabernacle Gardens, off Hackney Road, and has remained primarily dedicated to HIV/AIDS care since.

Further redevelopment of the area led to demolition of the 1980s building, and in 2014 the hospital moved into its latest premises at the same location. During the COVID-19 pandemic in the United Kingdom, Mildmay became the primary referral unit for homeless Londoners with COVID-19 requiring non-intensive inpatient care. After renewed threats of closure in 2020, its services were expanded to non-HIV care pathways, including step-down care for rough sleepers recovering from illness or injury, post-detoxification care (since 2022), and general neurorehabilitation (since 2023).

Since its reopening, Mildmay has operated as an independent organisation which provides healthcare and social services under contract to the NHS. Approximately 80% of its expenses are funded by the NHS, with the remainder covered by donations and fundraising activities. As a tertiary referral hospital, Mildmay has no A&E department and, since the COVID-19 pandemic, has offered no outpatient or day-hospital services. Referrals for inpatient admission are accepted from anywhere in the UK.

As of 2024, Mildmay is rated "Good" by the Care Quality Commission (down from "Outstanding" in 2017). Its CEO is Geoff Coleman, and its president is Lord Fowler, former Secretary of State for Health and Social Services and Speaker of the House of Lords.

== Early history ==
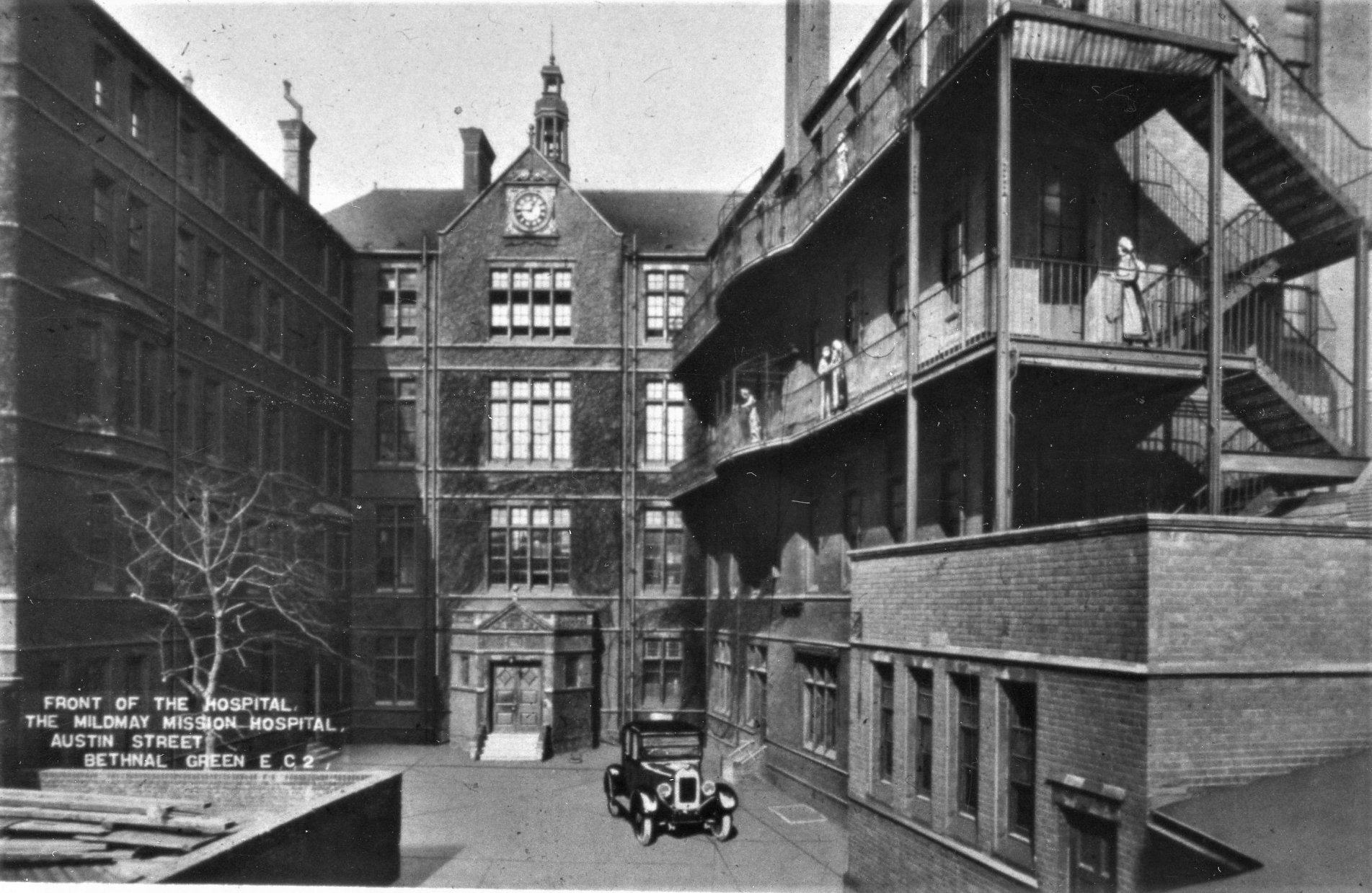
Austin Street premises of Mildmay Mission Hospital in 1892

Mildmay Mission Hospital was opened in 1877 by Catherine Pennefather (widow of Reverend William Pennefather) and a group of other so-called Mildmay Deaconesses in a disused warehouse behind St Leonard's Church, Shoreditch, in the heart of the Old Nichol rookery. With 27 beds, the staff consisted of a doctor and three nurses, as well as a number of Deaconesses who trained as nurses from 1883 onwards. Despite its strong evangelical Christian orientation, patients were admitted regardless of religion, and the hospital often treated members of the East End's Jewish community.

In 1886, Maud Cattell joined Mildmay Mission and was trained as a nurse by Pennefather; she would ultimately run the hospital for the next 30 years. In anticipation of slum clearances by the London County Council, construction was begun in 1890 of a new, larger hospital on Austin Street off Hackney Road; it opened in 1892 with 50 beds and additional staff. Pennefather died shortly afterwards, in January 1893.

The First World War posed particular challenges, and in 1916 the hospital closed for the first time due to drainage issues. With assistance from Elizabeth Garrett Anderson, Cattell was able to reopen the facilities partially, but in 1917 the hospital was overwhelmed with casualties from the Gotha raids. By 1918 Cattell was running the hospital alone, in charge of not only nursing but also administrative activities (the administrative section of Mildmay Mission had closed earlier that year) and even cooking patients' meals. In August 1919, Cattell appointed Dora Woodhouse as her replacement and retired from Mildmay.

With the establishment of the National Health Service in 1948, Mildmay Hospital was incorporated into the NHS as part of the North East Metropolitan Regional Hospital Board. Kenneth Buxton became the medical superintendent in 1954 and oversaw significant work on the hospital premises, including the construction of a residential wing for the nursing staff and a 1965 extension inaugurated by Princess Alexandra; he held the position until 1974, when the hospital was transferred to the Tower Hamlets Health District. Mildmay continued to serve the community as a general cottage hospital until 1982.

== Closure and reopening ==
In December 1980, the Tower Hamlets Health Authority set up a working group to decide on the future of Mildmay Hospital, initially with a view to using the hospital's facilities to cover services considered underprovided in the area. However, loss of staff positions and pressure to reduce NHS spending made the proposal untenable, and in September 1982 it was rejected in favour of the hospital's closure. Despite a temporary reprieve and alternative proposals, services were effectively wound down over a 3-month period starting November 1982.

Soon afterwards, Helen Taylor Thompson, then chair of the recently defunct Hospital Advisory Committee (and a member of the Mildmay Board of Trustees since 1952), began campaigning for the hospital's continued operation and, ultimately, reopening. Further attempts to change the hospital's provision of services were proposed, ranging from a walk-in minor injuries unit to a day centre for elderly residents of the community, but all were unsuccessful, as was an attempt to base a GP practice on the hospital premises. On 12 March 1984, the final decision to close the hospital permanently was announced.

On the basis of a feasibility study conducted the year before and presented to Norman Fowler, then Secretary of State for Health and Social Services, it was finally proposed that the facility be reopened as a voluntary charitable hospital, fully independent of the NHS. The core argument was that voluntary hospitals which had been transferred to NHS management under the National Health Service Act 1946 but were affiliated with a particular religious denomination were entitled to having their denominational character preserved, and closure would run counter to this legal provision (which applied to only six hospitals in the UK, one being Mildmay). This proposal was successful, and in October 1985 Mildmay was officially reopened in premises leased from the NHS at a "peppercorn" rent. Initially it was registered as a nursing home, not a hospital, and could accept no more than 14 inpatients; medical cover was provided by an adjoining GP surgery. Until late 1986, the patient population comprised chronically ill and disabled young adults from the community, as well as convalescents who were well enough to be discharged from acute hospital beds but needed further care.

=== The AIDS crisis ===
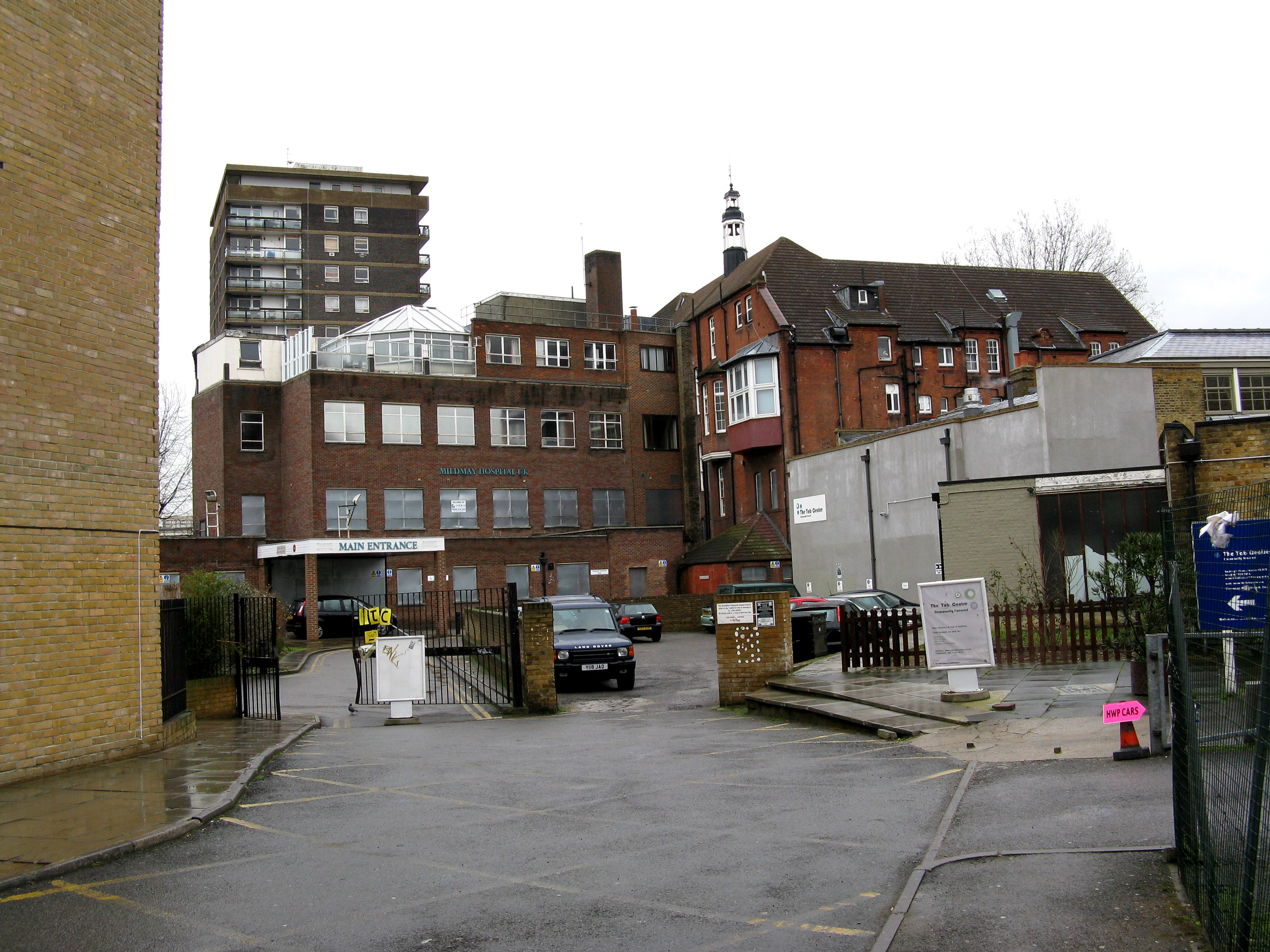
Now-demolished Mildmay Hospital building (1988–2011)

In late 1986, CARE TRUST, a now defunct Christian charity, approached Taylor Thompson and suggested that Mildmay could be well-placed to provide hospice care for people with AIDS. At the time there was still great uncertainty surrounding the care of these patients (the UK's first dedicated AIDS ward, Broderip Ward in Middlesex Hospital, had not yet opened), and the proposal was discussed with senior staff at major London hospitals and with the local health authority in Tower Hamlets. Despite initial resistance both from church leaders on the Mildmay board and from organisations representing the gay community, a rapport was quickly established, and in January 1987 work was started to convert one of the nursing home's wards into a dedicated AIDS hospice, which would become the first of its kind in Europe.

Several members of the hospital's medical staff (including Veronica Moss, its superintendent since October 1986) made visits to San Francisco to learn more about HIV/AIDS and current care practices. These visits informed the design of the wards and the decision to "beautify" the facilities, making them more welcoming for end-of-life patients. The first patient was admitted in February 1988, and Mildmay was officially reopened as a hospital on 19 May, in a ribbon-cutting ceremony again led by Princess Alexandra.

Before her death in 1997, Diana, Princess of Wales visited the hospital frequently as part of her HIV/AIDS advocacy efforts.

=== Redevelopment ===
In 2014, as part of the "New Mildmay" redevelopment project led by the hospital and Shoreditch Tabernacle Baptist Church, new purpose-built premises on Tabernacle Gardens off Hackney Road were designed by Feilden Clegg Bradley Studios and Matthew Lloyd Architects. The new hospital, constructed within the footprint of the demolished 1980s building, opened in September 2014 and was inaugurated on 14 December 2015 by Prince Harry. The clock of the original 1892 Mildmay Mission Hospital features prominently on the façade.

During the COVID-19 pandemic in the United Kingdom, Mildmay became the main referral hospital for homeless Londoners with COVID-19 requiring non-intensive inpatient care, via the so-called Step-Down COVID-Care Pathway. Four inpatient beds were designated for this purpose, and referrals were accepted from outreach teams and homeless hostels, including of patients not registered with a GP. The pathway remained in place through 2020.

In 2020, Mildmay was again threatened with closure as clinical commissioning groups (CCGs) objected to its high rates of admission of patients from outside East London and elsewhere in the UK. The NHS justified the decision by arguing that improvements in HIV treatment had greatly reduced the need for inpatient care of this patient population. Protests were raised by MP Rushanara Ali and several HIV/AIDS advocates, and a Change.org petition was created to keep the hospital open. Days before its planned closure, Mildmay was authorised to start operating the Step-down Homeless Medical Care Pathway, a new service designed to provide supportive and rehabilitative care for unhoused patients who have been discharged from acute-care hospitals but are still recovering from illness or trauma. This was first service of its kind in London, and was recognised by the Care Quality Commission as an area of "outstanding practice" in its 2021 inspection report. Since then, the hospital had added two further specialist care pathways: REBUILD, established in 2022 for inpatient post-alcohol- and drug detoxification care of patients who are sleeping rough, living in hostels, or at high risk of returning to homelessness; and Neuro 2B, a general specialist neurorehabilitation pathway established in 2023 for patients discharged from acute medical/surgical beds. CCGs were abolished in 2022, and in May 2023 the hospital officially declared it was no longer in danger of closure. In 2024, the London Overground line running from Stratford to Richmond/Clapham Junction was named the Mildmay line, in honour of the hospital's work during the HIV/AIDS crisis in the 1980s and 1990s.

== Patronage ==
As of 2024, the patrons of Mildmay Mission Hospital include Lord Darzi, Martyn Lewis, Judi Dench, Cliff Richard, the Lord McColl of Dulwich, Humphrey Thomas Norrington, and Roger Royle.
