= Elizabeth Baxter =

- Born: 16 December 1837; Evesham
- Died: 19 December 1926 (aged 89); Hove

Elizabeth (Lizzie) Baxter born Elizabeth (Lizzie) Foster (16 December 1837 – 19 December 1926) was a British evangelist.

== Life ==
Baxter was born in Evesham in 1837. Her parents were Edith and Thomas Foster. They had a comfortable life as her father had a food-processing business. She was taught by a governess until she went to school in Worcester.

At the age of 21, she reported a spiritual event that led her to become a religious leader. For a short time she helped Robert Aitken.

She was invited to assist William Pennefather at his Mildmay Mission where Deaconesses were trained. Well-educated young women were educated in theory and practice for two years at Mildmay, before sending them to full-time careers in outlying missions. Whilst she was there she designed their bonnet and dress uniforms. It was said that there were "About 200 deaconesses at any one time; [their] distinctive uniform allowed them to work in roughest areas unmolested." She joined in 1866 and had then led the institution for two years.

She then married Michael Paget Baxter who she had met through the Mildmay Mission. Michael came from a religious family. His father had published his prophecies, but was embarrassed when his predictions failed to appear. Her husband was an ordained deacon. He had spent time in Canada, became known as "Prophet Baxter", and toured preaching about the imminent return of Christ. Two years before they married he started the Christian Herald.

She and her husband were both of significant assistance to the American evangelists Ira D. Sankey and Dwight L. Moody when Sankey and Moody came to the UK on revivalist preaching tours. Elizabeth believed in the power of prayer to bring healing and she founded the Bethshan Home in Islington with Charlotte Murray in 1882. This was an important moment to the founders of the Pentecostal church. Next door to the home in Islington she founded a training centre for missionaries and over 300 were trained before the end of the nineteenth century at that house. The Bethshan (house of healing) was a quick success and buildings changed three times by 1884 when a hall was being used that could hold 600 people. That year Elizabeth became the editor of Thy Healer which was published giving first-hand accounts of those who were healed by their faith. In 1894 Elizabeth went on a "world tour" to speak about her work including a mission in India. Five years later she made a second trip to see the progress in India.

Baxter died in Hove.
