= Kenneth Buxton =

Medical missionary (b. 1909, d. 2001)

Kenneth Buxton was a prominent leader in the medical missionary world working in the mid-20th century in Africa. Buxton was born July 19, 1909, in Hertfordshire, England, and died November 1, 2001, in Wallingford, Oxfordshire.

He started a medical school in Addis Ababa, Ethiopia. He eventually was evacuated from Ethiopia because of the Italian Invasion by Mussolini and returned to England. However, he returned to Burundi in 1938 which was then part of Ruanda-Urundi administered by Belgium through a League of Nations mandate. With very minimal resources and external funding, he built a hospital at Ibuye for the Ruanda Mission, simultaneously in charge of the surgery and medical procedures while also training nurses and other doctors. In 1954, he returned to England to work as Medical Superintendent for Mildmay Mission Hospital.

== Early life ==
Buxton was born in England and attended Trinity College, Cambridge. He then worked as a surgeon and casualty officer at St. Thomas' before being called to service as a medical missionary.

== Missionary work ==
Buxton initially went to work in Ethiopia, however in 1935, Emilio De Bono made it into Ethiopia from Eritrea, which led Ethiopia to declare war on Italy. Buxton returned home with the exiled King of Ethiopia, Haile Selassie.

He eventually returned to Africa in 1938 where he was tasked with creating and running a hospital in Ibuye, Burundi, working under the Ruanda Mission. The Ruanda Mission was founded by two physicians: Dr. Len Sharp and Dr. Algie Stanley Smith.

He and his wife, a trained nurse, as well as three trained local staff started the hospital in 1939. Buxton was without running water or electricity and had very little help from other people. Buxton built the hospital from bricks he made from clay from a valley and because of the lack of resources, surgical instruments were only able to be sterilized by a pressure cooker. Buxton worked in a grass shack for the first five years of his service. In May 1945, the 36 bed hospital was opened at Ibuye with the wards built in memory of Rev. J. E. Cox. He also added a nurse and midwifery training school to the hospital to train local nurses as well as the Canon Warner Memorial Theological College. The theological college was founded with Lawrence Barham, father of Ken Barham. Despite these successes, Buxton still had to often plead for more supplies from England, especially in 1945, because of the increase of patients with typhus. There were a multitude of diseases that Buxton had to deal with ranging from malaria to typhus epidemics. Buxton implemented his Christian faith into his service and often went to inter-mission African conventions.

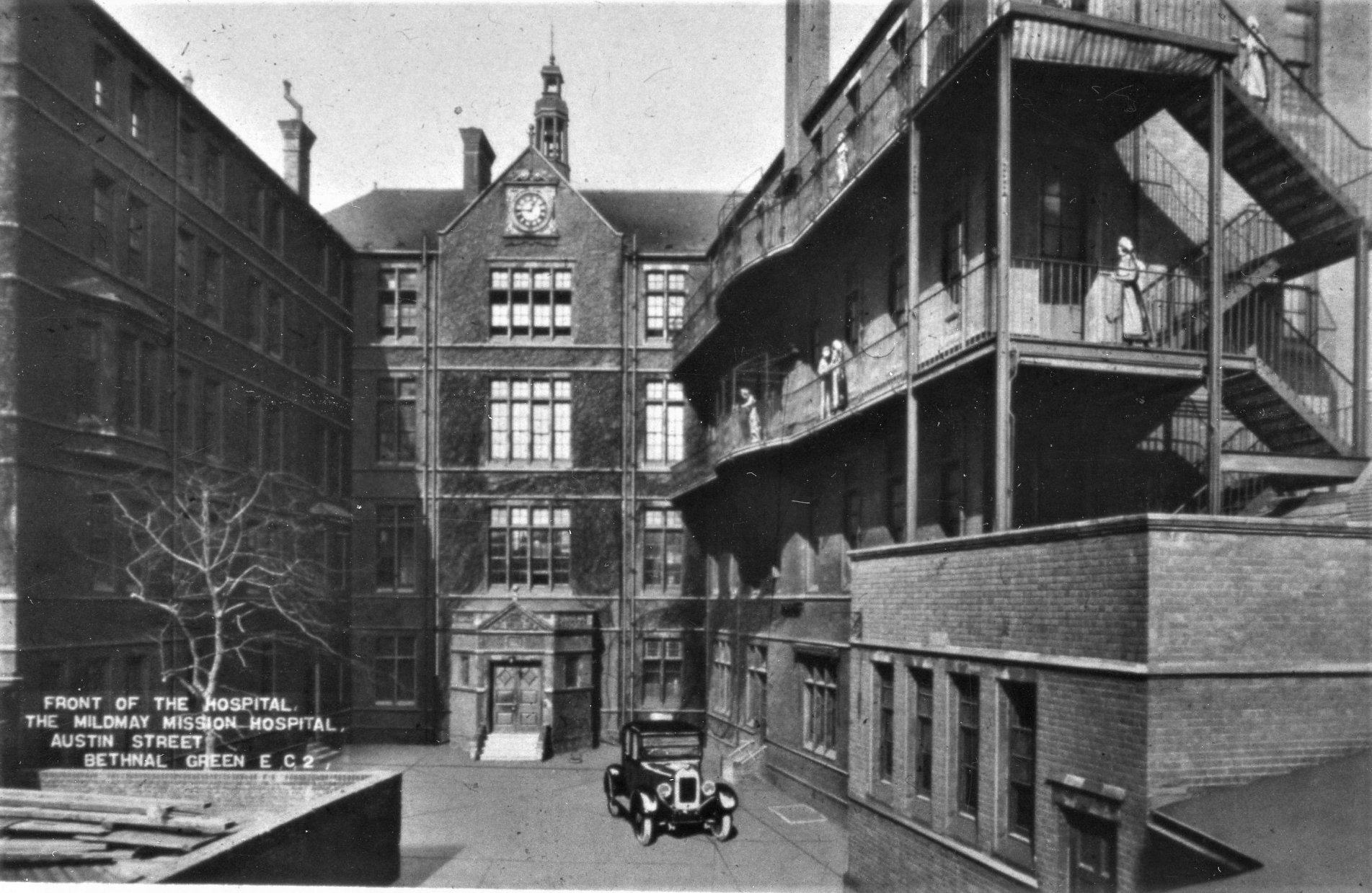
Mildmay Mission Hospital

After fifteen years of service, where he treated hundreds of cases in six mission hospitals, Buxton returned home to England to work at Mildmay Mission Hospital.

== Legacy ==
Buxton's legacy included leaving behind a mission hospital in Burundi, which is still there. Additionally, Buxton worked for Mildmay Mission Hospital, which was reopened in 1988 as Europe's first hospice for people with AIDS. It was also the first hospital to be guaranteed a private charter from the NHS. Buxton used the knowledge of diseases that he had experienced in Burundi to write articles on issues like peptic ulcerations so that people in Europe were aware of the diseases that he faced while abroad. Buxton went on to become the chairman of the Ruanda Mission from 1965 to 1974 and was Medical Superintendent at Mildmay Hospital from 1954 to 1974.

== Personal life ==
Buxton had many family members who were also medical missionaries. His older sister Hannah was a nurse in Ceylon and his other sister Ruth was a nurse in Kenya. His daughter, Angela Buxton, would work as a medical missionary in Burundi.

He ended his life with his wife, Agnes, four children, and nine grandchildren. He found great joy in gardening and the countryside. He was a man of deep Christian faith and used that faith in how he practiced medicine both abroad and at home.
