= Tompkins Table =

Table that ranks Cambridge Colleges

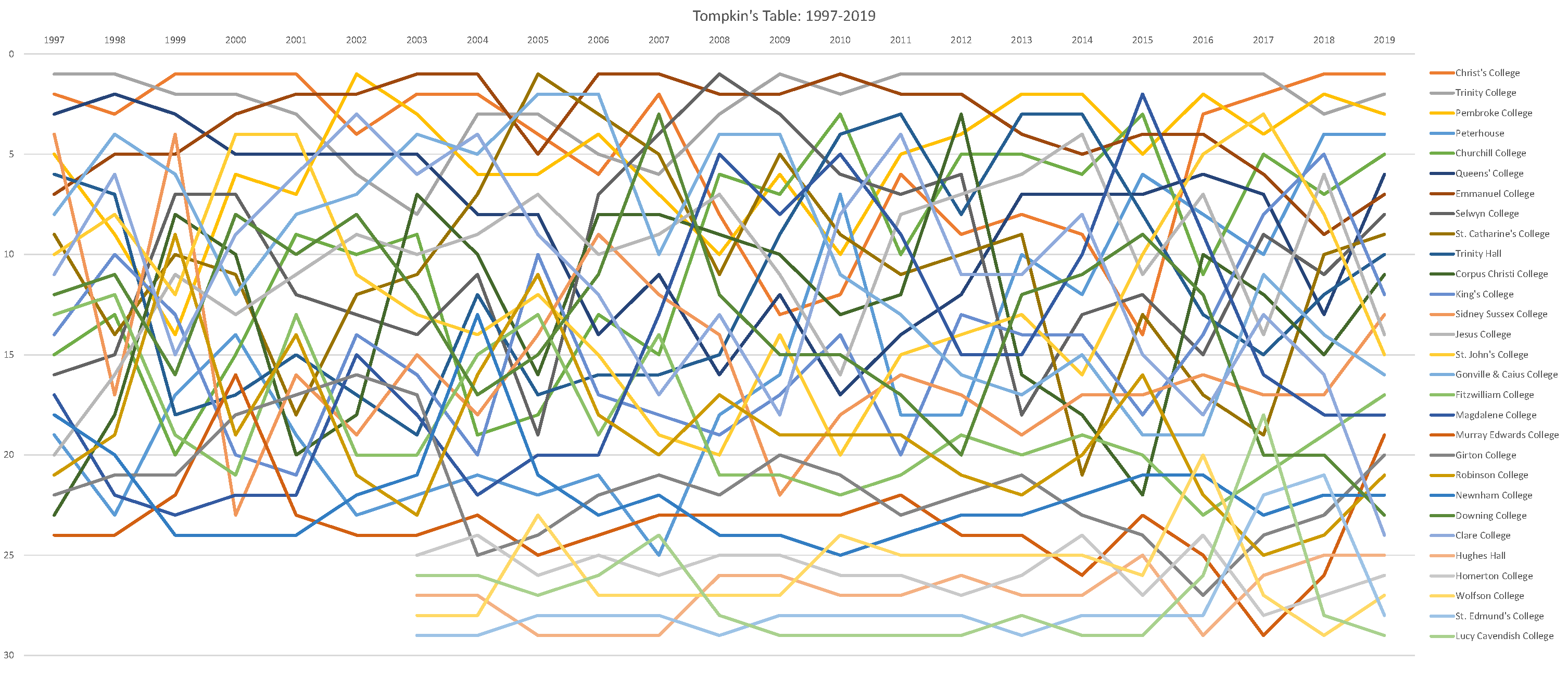
A chart of the Tompkins Table from 1997 to 2019

The Tompkins Table is an annual ranking that lists the Colleges of the University of Cambridge in order of their undergraduate students' performances in that year's examinations. Two colleges—Darwin and Clare Hall—do not have undergraduate students and do not feature in the list. It was created in 1981 by Peter Tompkins, then a third-year undergraduate mathematics student at Trinity College, who compiled it for many years. It was formerly published by The Independent. Since 2016, it has been published by Varsity, a student newspaper of the University of Cambridge. It is not an official University of Cambridge table. It does not take account of students who are not candidates for Honours degrees, or those who have failed to gain a degree. It was not published in 2020 or 2021 as a result of the restrictions to the examination process brought about as a result of the COVID-19 pandemic. It was also not published in 2023.

== Rankings ==
=== Current rankings ===
Initially, it only included final year exams but since 1997 has covered all exams for which grades are allocated. The table allocates 5 points for a First Class degree, 3 points for an Upper Second (known also as a 2.i), 2.5 points for a Second Undivided (A second class degree that is not divided into Upper or Lower), 2 points for a Lower Second (a 2.ii), 1 point for a Third and no points for someone only granted an allowance towards an Ordinary Degree. The scores in each subject are then weighted to a common average, to avoid the bias towards colleges with higher proportions of students entered for subjects which receive higher average grades. The result is expressed as a percentage of the total number of points available. The differences between the highest places on the table are usually very slight. Christ's College was the top college in 2019, after coming top in 2018 following seven years in which Trinity College came top. The rankings are not officially endorsed by the University. Since Darwin College and Clare Hall admit only graduate students, they do not feature in this undergraduate ranking. Some of the mature colleges, including St. Edmund's College, Hughes Hall, and Wolfson College, tend to perform relatively poorly in the Tompkins Table, but have significantly more graduate students than undergraduate students, so the results here are not representative of the majority of the student population of each of these colleges.

The following table applies the points system to the University of Cambridge's published examination results for 2025-26: five points for a first, three for an upper second, 2.5 for an undivided second, two for a lower second, and one for a third. Scores are expressed as percentages of the maximum available points, excluding “Other results”. These calculations use aggregate college results without subject weighting.

Varsity reported that Trinity, Christ's, and Selwyn occupied the first three positions in the 2026 Tompkins Table, followed by Queens' and Gonville and Caius.

Calculated rankings from 2025–26 examination results
Position	College	Score (%)	Change in rank (since 2025)
1	Trinity	75.49	0
2	Christ's	74.23	0
3	Selwyn	74.15	0
4	Queens'	73.60	1
5	Gonville and Caius	73.22	6
6	St John's	73.03	2
7	Pembroke	72.53	9
8	Emmanuel	72.34	-1
9	Clare	71.36	0
10	Jesus	70.83	4
11	Magdalene	70.65	6
12	Churchill	70.08	-8
13	Wolfson	69.89	0
14	Corpus Christi	69.77	1
15	Downing	69.56	-9
16	Sidney Sussex	69.20	2
17	Trinity Hall	69.08	2
18	St Catharine's	67.99	-6
19	Peterhouse	67.61	-9
20	Hughes Hall	67.57	3
21	King's	66.94	6
22	Robinson	66.93	-2
23	Fitzwilliam	66.63	-2
24	Newnham	66.47	1
25	Lucy Cavendish	66.17	-3
26	St Edmund's	65.35	-2
27	Murray Edwards	65.16	-1
28	Girton	64.09	0
29	Homerton	63.52	0

Positive changes indicate a rise in rank. Scores are calculated from the displayed counts and rounded to two decimal places.

=== Past rankings ===
The 2026 column contains the calculated rankings above. The mean is the arithmetic mean of the ranks in the 16 years displayed.

College	2008	2009	2010	2011	2012	2013	2014	2015	2016	2017	2018	2019	2022	2024	2025	2026	Mean
Christ's College	8	13	12	6	9	8	9	14	3	2	1	1	1	2	2	2	5.81
Churchill College	6	7	3	10	5	5	6	3	11	5	7	5	8	6	4	12	6.44
Clare College	13	18	11	4	11	11	8	15	18	13	16	24	12	12	9	9	12.75
Corpus Christi College	9	10	13	12	3	16	18	22	10	12	15	11	9	3	15	14	12.00
Downing College	12	15	15	17	20	12	11	9	12	20	20	23	13	11	6	15	14.44
Emmanuel College	2	2	1	2	2	4	5	4	4	6	9	7	11	9	7	8	5.19
Fitzwilliam College	21	21	22	21	19	20	19	20	23	21	19	17	20	21	21	23	20.50
Girton College	22	20	21	22	22	21	23	24	27	24	23	20	25	28	28	28	23.63
Gonville & Caius College	4	4	11	13	16	17	15	19	19	11	14	16	7	10	11	5	12.00
Homerton College	25	25	26	26	27	26	24	27	24	28	27	26	26	25	29	29	26.25
Hughes Hall	26	26	27	27	26	27	27	25	29	26	25	25	23	29	23	20	25.69
Jesus College	7	11	16	8	7	6	4	11	7	14	6	14	4	18	14	10	9.81
King's College	19	17	14	20	13	14	14	18	14	8	5	12	22	24	27	21	16.38
Lucy Cavendish College	28	29	29	29	29	28	29	29	26	18	28	29	29	23	22	25	26.88
Magdalene College	5	8	9	9	15	15	10	2	9	16	18	18	18	16	17	11	12.25
Murray Edwards College	24	23	23	22	24	24	26	23	25	29	26	19	27	26	26	27	24.63
Newnham College	23	24	25	24	23	23	22	21	21	23	22	22	24	27	25	24	23.31
Pembroke College	10	6	10	5	4	2	2	5	2	4	2	3	5	4	16	7	5.44
Peterhouse	18	16	18	18	18	10	12	6	8	10	4	4	15	15	10	19	12.56
Queens' College	16	12	17	14	12	7	7	7	6	7	13	6	10	7	5	4	9.38
Robinson College	17	19	19	19	21	22	20	16	22	25	24	21	17	17	20	22	20.06
Selwyn College	1	3	6	7	6	18	13	12	15	9	11	8	14	5	3	3	8.38
Sidney Sussex College	14	22	18	16	17	19	17	17	16	17	17	13	16	20	18	16	17.06
St. Catharine's College	11	5	9	11	10	9	21	13	17	19	10	9	3	8	12	18	11.56
St. Edmund's College	29	28	28	28	28	29	28	28	28	22	21	28	28	13	24	26	26.00
St. John's College	20	14	20	15	14	13	16	10	5	3	8	15	6	14	8	6	11.69
Trinity College	3	1	2	1	1	1	1	1	1	1	3	2	2	1	1	1	1.44
Trinity Hall	15	9	4	3	8	3	3	8	13	15	12	10	19	19	19	17	11.06
Wolfson College	27	27	24	25	25	25	25	26	20	27	29	27	21	22	13	13	23.50

=== Past rankings ===
College	2008	2009	2010	2011	2012	2013	2014	2015	2016	2017	2018	2019	2022	2024	2025	Mean
Christ's College	8	13	12	6	9	8	9	14	3	2	1	1	1	2	2	6.93
Churchill College	6	7	3	10	5	5	6	3	11	5	7	5	8	6	4	6.27
Clare College	13	18	11	4	11	11	8	15	18	13	16	24	12	12	9	13.40
Corpus Christi College	9	10	13	12	3	16	18	22	10	12	15	11	9	3	15	12.00
Downing College	12	15	15	17	20	12	11	9	12	20	20	23	13	11	6	14.07
Emmanuel College	2	2	1	2	2	4	5	4	4	6	9	7	11	9	7	5.07
Fitzwilliam College	21	21	22	21	19	20	19	20	23	21	19	17	20	21	21	20.14
Girton College	22	20	21	22	22	21	23	24	27	24	23	20	25	28	28	23.93
Gonville & Caius College	4	4	11	13	16	17	15	19	19	11	14	16	7	10	11	12.40
Homerton College	25	25	26	26	27	26	24	27	24	28	27	26	26	25	29	26.07
Hughes Hall	26	26	27	27	26	27	27	25	29	26	25	25	23	29	23	25.73
Jesus College	7	11	16	8	7	6	4	11	7	14	6	14	4	18	14	10.20
King's College	19	17	14	20	13	14	14	18	14	8	5	12	22	24	27	16.60
Lucy Cavendish College	28	29	29	29	29	28	29	29	26	18	28	29	29	23	22	27.40
Magdalene College	5	8	9	9	15	15	10	2	9	16	18	18	18	16	17	12.40
Murray Edwards College	24	23	23	22	24	24	26	23	25	29	26	19	27	26	26	24.13
Newnham College	23	24	25	24	23	23	22	21	21	23	22	22	24	27	25	23.20
Pembroke College	10	6	10	5	4	2	2	5	2	4	2	3	5	4	16	5.47
Peterhouse	18	16	18	18	18	10	12	6	8	10	4	4	15	15	10	12.13
Queens' College	16	12	17	14	12	7	7	7	6	7	13	6	10	7	5	9.80
Robinson College	17	19	19	19	21	22	20	16	22	25	24	21	17	17	20	19.80
Selwyn College	1	3	6	7	6	18	13	12	15	9	11	8	14	5	3	8.87
Sidney Sussex College	14	22	18	16	17	19	17	17	16	17	17	13	16	20	18	17.27
St. Catharine's College	11	5	9	11	10	9	21	13	17	19	10	9	3	8	12	11.13
St. Edmund's College	29	28	28	28	28	29	28	28	28	22	21	28	28	13	24	26.40
St. John's College	20	14	20	15	14	13	16	10	5	3	8	15	6	14	8	12.07
Trinity College	3	1	2	1	1	1	1	1	1	1	3	2	2	1	1	1.40
Trinity Hall	15	9	4	3	8	3	3	8	13	15	12	10	19	19	19	10.33
Wolfson College	27	27	24	25	25	25	25	26	20	27	29	27	21	22	13	24.53

== Similar league tables ==
=== Baxter tables ===
Certain Colleges of the University of Cambridge commission similar tables called Baxter Tables from Martin Baxter who is a financial analyst specialising in mathematical modelling and who developed the Electoral Calculus website. Baxter tables rank colleges' undergraduate students by their year and subject separately and are delivered in July or August. They are compiled using published Class Lists, which do not include students who are not candidates for Honours degrees, or those who have failed to gain a degree, or those whose names the Council have determined should be withheld from public display. They are meant for internal use of Colleges but not the University, being distributed to the Senior Tutors of the Colleges, with the full tables not being published publicly or outside of the Colleges, and some students being unaware of their existence. However, the rankings of Colleges in the Baxter Tables are sometimes referred to by Colleges in publicly available literature, and the methodology used to compile the Baxter Tables is also available. There is also a 'value-added' table, which shows how students' results improve over the course of their years at Cambridge, and is intended to give a measure or indication of the quality of teaching at the different Colleges. However, with such small sample sizes, the amount of meaningful information which can be extracted from these tables is questionable.

=== Norrington table ===
The corresponding ranking for Oxford colleges is the Norrington Table. Since 1986, when the University of Oxford adopted split second-class degrees, the Norrington Table has adopted the same method of scoring as the Tompkins Table, but without the weighting attached to individual subject scores.

=== Oxbridge College League Table ===
Starting in 2020, The Telegraph compiled an Oxbridge college league table, drawing on both academic and other factors, including accommodation, lifestyle and wealth.

== See also ==
- Norrington Table
