= Patrick Reilly =

British diplomat (1909-1999)

Sir D'Arcy Patrick Reilly, GCMG (17 March 1909 – 6 October 1999) was a British diplomat who served as ambassador to the USSR and France. He held several senior posts and was called "the perfect mandarin."

== Early life and education ==
D'Arcy Patrick Reilly was born at Ooty, India, the only son of Sir (Henry) D'Arcy Cornelius Reilly, ICS (1876–1948), Chief Justice of Mysore. He was educated at Winchester College and New College, Oxford, where he was awarded BA in 1932. He won a Laming Travelling Fellowship at the Queen's College and was a Fellow of All Souls from 1932 to 1939, the same year as Isaiah Berlin. He joined the Diplomatic Service in 1933.

== Career ==
Reilly was 3rd Secretary in Teheran from 1935 to 1938 and then had a brief period in the UK Delegation to the League of Nations Assembly. From 1939 to 1942, he worked at the Ministry of Economic Warfare and was awarded the OBE in 1942. In 1942 he was seconded to take up the post of Private Secretary to 'C', Major-General Sir Stewart Menzies, the Chief of the Secret Service. He became First Secretary under Harold Macmillan at Algiers in 1943, and under Duff Cooper at Paris in 1944. He became First Secretary at Athens in 1945, and then Counsellor from 1947 to 1948 during the height of the Greek Civil War. In 1949 he was at the Imperial Defence College, and was appointed CMG.

In 1950 he became Assistant Secretary at the Foreign Office. After serving as Minister in Paris from 1953, he returned to the Foreign Office as Deputy Secretary in 1956. In 1957 he was awarded KCMG and became British Ambassador to Russia playing a central role in the Summit meeting of 1959 alongside Macmillan and Selwyn Lloyd. In 1960 he returned to the Foreign Office as Deputy Secretary. He led the UK Delegation to the Icelandic Fisheries Negotiations in 1960 and in 1964 headed the British party at the UN Conference on Trade and Development. Much of his time however was spent on British membership of the EEC and Franco-British relations. In 1965 he became British Ambassador to France until 1968 when George Brown effectively terminated Reilly's career abruptly and with scant courtesy, having concluded that he was the wrong man in Paris. Brown, with his comparatively poor upbringing, resented those of privileged background, had accordingly disliked Reilly, and was moved to 'loutish and drunken displays of rudeness' in the face of Reilly's 'natural courtesy'.

Reilly was awarded the GCMG in 1968. After retiring, Reilly became Chairman of the Banque Nationale de Paris Ltd (formerly British and French Bank) until 1980. He was Chairman of the London Chamber of Commerce Standing Committee for Common Market Countries from 1970 to 1972. He also became a member of the Council of Bedford College, University of London, in 1970 and was on the London University Management Committee of the British Institute in Paris from 1970 to 1979. He was president of the London Chamber of Commerce between 1972 and 1975, and was vice president thereafter. He was a member of the Légion d’Honneur in 1979 and was awarded Honorary D.Litt. at Bath University in 1981. He died in 1999, aged 90.

== Personal life ==
Reilly married Rachel Mary Sykes, daughter of Sir Percy Sykes. After her death in 1984, Reilly married Ruth Norrington, widow of Sir Arthur Norrington (in 1987).

Diplomatic posts
Preceded by Sir Pierson Dixon	British Ambassador to France; 1965–1968	Succeeded by Sir Christopher Soames
