= Holy Trinity Church, Walton =

Church in Somerset, England

Holy Trinity Church
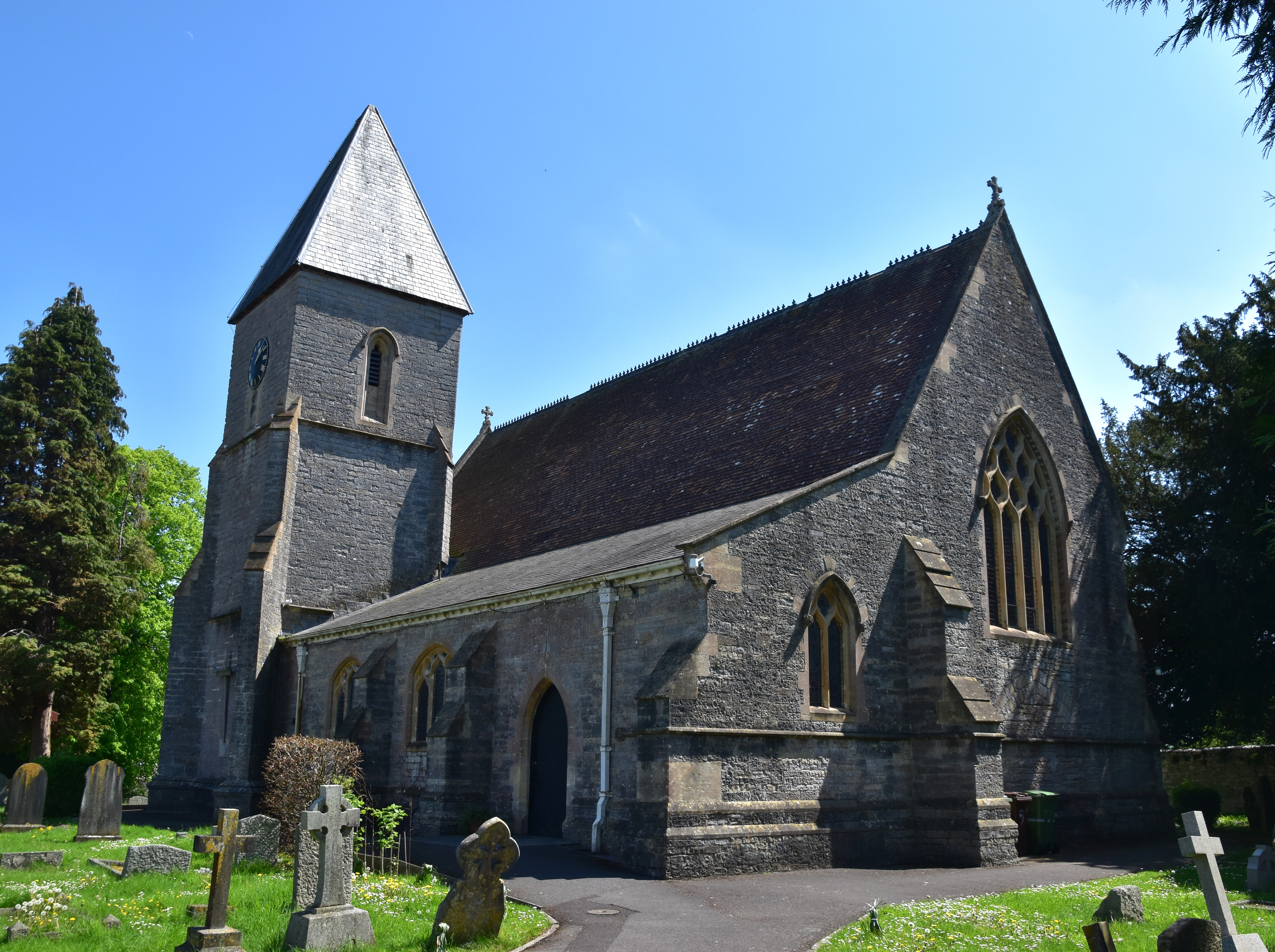

Religion
- Affiliation: Church of England
- Ecclesiastical or organizational status: Active
- Year consecrated: 1866

Location
- Location: Walton, Somerset, England
- Interactive map of Holy Trinity Church
- Coordinates: 51.1235°N 2.7710°W

Architecture
- Architect: Rev. J. F. Turner
- Type: Church
- Style: Decorated style

Holy Trinity Church is a Church of England church in Walton, Somerset, England. It was rebuilt in 1865–66 to the design of Rev. J. F. Turner and is a Grade II listed building.

== History ==
The earliest reference to a church at Walton dates to 1168, when one was recorded as being in the possession of Glastonbury Abbey. Walton formed a benefice with Street from at least the middle of the 13th century, with Walton being considered an annexed chapelry. The church was dedicated to St. Nicholas in 1546 and later rededicated to Holy Trinity in the early 18th century. In its final form, the church was made up of a nave, chancel, porch and tower with five bells. It is believed to have been of 12th-century origin, with a major rebuild of the 14th century, during which time the north and south porches were added. The south porch was later converted into a vestry. The original central tower and part of the nave were demolished in 1836 and a new tower built on the north side of the church.

By the middle of the 19th century, the church was in a dilapidated condition. The rector, Rev. James George Hickley, embarked on a rebuilding scheme, with much of the work being funded by Rev. Hickley and the Marquess of Bath, John Thynne, the patron of the living, lord of the manor and chief landowner. Construction began in 1865. The church was rebuilt by Mr. Frederick Merrick of Glastonbury to the plans of Rev. J. F. Turner, with Mr. Robert Close acting as clerk of the works.

As part of the rebuilding project, a north aisle was added to provide additional accommodation and a vestry added to the north side of the chancel. The tower of 1836 was retained, with its buttresses repaired and the slopes covered with Doulting stone. As it was intended to heighten the tower and add a spire, the pinnacles were removed in anticipation of this. A wooden spire covered in slate, surmounted by a weathervane, was later added in 1886. A clock was installed on the tower at the same time, in memory of Rev. D. A. Phillips, a former rector.

The church was consecrated on 3 May 1866 by the Right Rev. Bishop Anderson, the incumbent of Clifton, in the absence of the Bishop of Bath and Wells. Walton became its own parish in 1886, but was later reunited with Street in 1978. Today the church forms part of the Benefice of Street, Walton and Compton Dundon.

== Architecture ==
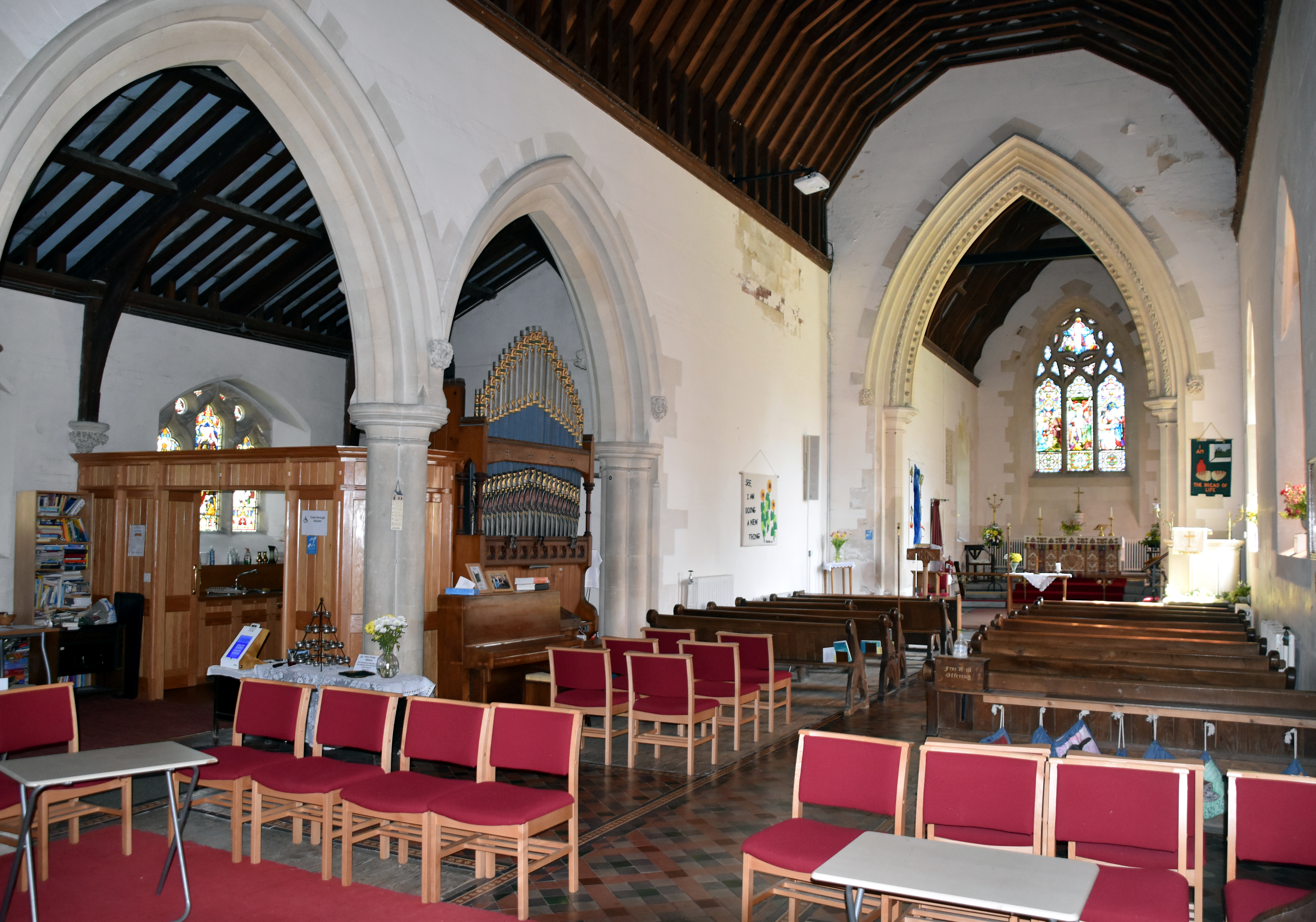
The interior of Holy Trinity.

Holy Trinity is built of Blue Lias stone with dressings of ground Box stone. The Blue Lias stone was sourced from quarries in the parish owned by the Marquess of Bath. The roof of the nave is laid with red Roman tiles. The north aisle roof was most recently laid with Welsh slate in the 20th century. The church is made up of a three-bay nave, north aisle, chancel, north vestry, south porch and three-stage tower. The interior of the walls are of Bath stone with courses of red brick, and the pillars of the north aisle are also of Bath stone. The corbels were carved by Mr. John Seymour of Taunton and Mr. Albert Merrick of Glastonbury. The roof of the nave is made of red deal shingle, with varnished cross ties. The chancel has a similar roof, but with curved ribs in lieu of cross ties.

The church's pews and the altar are of oak, the pulpit of Bath stone and the lectern of iron and brass. The font, gifted by Lord John Thynne, is largely made of Caen stone, with four pillars of polished Devonshire marble. Three memorial tablets were retained from the old church, as was the top of a tomb of 14th-century origin, which was fixed in the north-west corner of the church. The south side of the chancel has a stained glass window in memory of the incumbent's first wife, Sophia Mary Hickley, who died in 1857. The stained glass window near the south porch was erected by Rev. Hickley in memory of his mother, Elizabeth Ann Hickley, who died in 1863. The stained glass window at the west end of the north aisle was gifted by Mr. Horner of Mells. All of the glazing was done by Messrs. Munden of Glastonbury. The church received choir stalls in 1933 and a new lectern in c. 1951.

The church's tower contains five bells, including one by Richard Austen, dated 1637, one by Thomas Purdue, dated 1687, and another by William Purdue, undated. One bell was cast by William Cockey in 1730 and another recast by Thomas Mears in 1814. All bells underwent repair in 1840 and were recast in 1935.

== Notable incumbents ==
- William Pennefather became the perpetual curate assisted by his wife Catherine in 1848. They moved on to Barnet in 1852.
