= Helen Taylor Thompson =

British aid worker (1924–2020)

- Born: 7 August 1924
- Died: 6 September 2020 (aged 96)
- Known for: co-founded Europe's first AIDS hospice

Helen Margaret Taylor Thompson OBE, née Laurie Walker (7 August 1924 – 6 September 2020) was a British aid worker who co-founded Europe's first AIDS hospice.

== Life ==
Helen was born to George Laurie Walker, Chairman of Africa Inland Mission, and Helen MacDonald Glegg, who died shortly after giving birth to her. She had one older brother, Stuart Alastair Laurie Walker, and was orphaned aged nine, when her father also died, shortly after helping to set up Kapsowar Hospital. She was raised under the care of her step-mother.

Helen's maternal family were a notable Anglo-Scottish one; Sir Alexander Glegg JP, one-time Mayor of Wandsworth and Chairman of the Council of the Congregational Union of England and Wales, was her grandfather, while her uncle was the well-known evangelist A. Lindsay Glegg.

On her paternal side, she believed that David Livingstone was a distant cousin of her father.

Helen had hoped to become a doctor, but this ambition was thwarted by the outbreak of World War II. In 1942, she joined the Special Operations Executive, signing the Official Secrets Act aged nineteen; she sent coded messages to agents in the field and arranged airdrops into occupied France, including a third of a million counterfeit pounds for the French Resistance. She had been invited to serve as an agent in the field herself, but was told that Eisenhower had said "he will not have the women on his conscience", as he felt none would return; Helen was reportedly 'furious'. After the war, she ran her own successful business for several years, and then turned for the rest of her life to charity work.

In 1952, Helen became a member of the board of the Mildmay Mission Hospital. The hospital had been founded by Catherine Pennefather in 1877 in a converted warehouse in Old Nichol slums behind Shoreditch Church. It was meant to be closed in the 1980's, but Helen led the campaign to keep it open and, inspired by Jesus' love for the outcast, converted it into Europe's first AIDS hospital, in the face of strong opposition.

With Lord Andrew Mawson and Adele Blakebrough, in 1995 Helen organised a meal for 33,000 people of a range of backgrounds to enjoy together. Termed the 'Great Banquet', this prompted the formation of the Community Action Network in 1998, which continues to provide support for other charities.

In 2000, Helen founded the charity 'Education Saves Lives', designed to educate children in the developing world about health issues.

Helen died in September 2020, at the age of 96. Her funeral was held in the Chapel of the Order of the British Empire in St Paul's Cathedral with a eulogy given by The Lord Chartres.

== Awards ==
In 1990, Helen was awarded the MBE and, in 2005, the OBE.

In 2018, she was chosen as one of the BBC's 100 Women who have made an impact.

In 2019, she was awarded an MD (Hon) from the University of Buckingham for her charitable work, particularly in the field of medicine.

== Personal life ==
Helen married John Derek Taylor-Thompson CB in late 1954. He was one of Her Majesty's Commissioners of Inland Revenue and died in 2014.

Helen adopted a little girl from Cambodia at the height of Pol Pot's atrocities.
