= Doneraile conspiracy =

Event in Irish history

The Doneraile conspiracy was an event and subsequent trial, during a time of agrarian unrest in Ireland, when many tenant farmers experienced extreme poverty and hardship at the hands of their landlords. Since the 18th century, the secret oath-bound society called the Whiteboys became very prominent in the Doneraile area. After a collapse of prices for agricultural produce after the Napoleonic Wars, and Napoleon’s defeat at Waterloo, and high rents of agricultural holdings, a rumour that murders of local landlords of the district were being planned. After a number of local people were indicted and brought to trial before a special commission, Daniel O’Connell, a famous lawyer and parliamentarian, became involved, leading to the discharge of many of the accused. O'Connell's victory was seen as one of his greatest triumphs and added to his national and international reputation.

== Prelude ==
Three Doneraile landlords were particularly hated for the treatment of tenant farmers. They were Michael Creagh, Rear Admiral Evans and George Bond Lowe. During January 1829, a dinner party was held at the seat of Rear Admiral Evans at Oldtown near Shanballymore. After the party, the carriage of Dr. Norcott was mistaken for that of Michael Creagh. The carriage was fired upon. Two coachmen were injured. George Bond Lowe was also shot at when at home in Clogher, and in a second incident, his horse was shot on his way home from Mallow Fair. The landlords in the area arrested over 21 Doneraile men from Doneraile in County Cork. They were caught up in a conspiracy when they were alleged to have been heard in a tent at Doneraile Fair conspiring to kill local landlords. Paid informers provided the evidence.

== The Trial-Part 1 ==
The Trial began on 22 October 1829 at the County Courthouse in Cork City. Rather than being tried by a Petit Jury, which considers the evidence at a trial and decides on the guilt or innocence of the accused, the accused were tried by a Grand Jury. This was a system of local administration, controlled by landlords and the legal profession.

The Commission was opened by Baron Pennefather and Mr. Justice Torrens. They were accompanied by the High Sheriff and the Solicitor General, Mr. John Doherty. Also in attendance were Crown Prosecutors on the Munster circuit, Sergt. Gould and Mr. Bennet K.C. The prosecution alleged that a number of farmers in the neighbourhood of Doneraile in County Cork had assembled in a tent at a fair in Rathclaire allegedly conspired to murder three landlords. They were overheard by Patrick Daly, who had attended the fair as a spy for Colonel Richard Hill. Daly (a former Whiteboy), saw that 22 men were arrested and charged.

They were brought before the Special Commission with a Grand Jury presided over by Baron Pennefather. The trial commenced on Friday 23 October, when four prisoners were put the bar: John Leary (Rossagh), James Roche (Wallstown), James McGrath (Wallstown), and William Shine (Carker). Five informer or approver witnesses gave evidence for the prosecution, including Patrick Daly (the spy), and Owen (Clampar) Daly, cousin of Patrick. The four were found guilty by the jury and sentenced to death by hanging.

The jury had taken twenty minutes.

== The Trial-Part 2 ==
On the second day, four more prisoners were scheduled to be put on trial. They were Edmund Connors, Michael Wallace, Patrick Lynch, and Timothy Barrett. As it was Saturday, the trial was postponed until the following Monday. The delay provided time for relatives to again seek to retain Daniel O’Connell, a famous lawyer and parliamentarian.

The families and friends of the accused men sent William Burke of Ballyhea to Daniel O’Connell, who was in his home in Derrynane in County Kerry. William Burke was the brother of one of the prisoners, John Burke.

O'Connell had been asked at the start of the summer to defend the men, but he had refused. Because the remaining prisoners were so afraid after the first trial, a further attempt was made, and they collected a sum of 100 guineas to retain him.

William Burke left Cork on the evening of Saturday 24 October 1829, for a night ride on one horse to O'Connell’s residence in Derrynane, a distance of 90 miles. He arrived at Derrynane at 8:30am.

Canon Sheehan in his book, Glenanaar

It is a wet, warm night, dark as Erebus; and the twain, steed and rider, knew nothing of the road. All they knew was that they should follow for some time the course of the river which they could hear murmuring on the left as it tore over stones and pebbles on its mad rush to the sea. They were soon splashed with mud from head to heel, and the soft, warm rain had penetrated under and through the light garments the rider wore, that his weight might lie easy on the gallant animal, on whose endurance and swiftness so many lives were now depending. But neither animal nor rider felt aught but the stimulus of some mighty force that summoned all their energies, and would make their success a triumph beyond description, and their failure-well, as the thought of its possibility flashed across the young man’s mind, a great lump came into his throat, and he had to gulp down his emotion.

O'Connell agreed to defend the prisoners after hearing Burke, who rested and refreshed his horse. He used the same animal and reached Cork on Monday morning. The round journey of 180 miles had taken 38 hours.

O'Connell set out for Cork that day on a coach with two horses. The roads were very bad, and he travelled the greater portion of the night. He used a light country gig, which he drove himself. He had slept at Macroom for three or four hours and set off in the morning for Cork, which he did not reach until about ten o'clock. And by three changes of horses, he arrived in Cork just as the court was resuming.

Baron Pennefather refused to adjourn the case until O’Connell’s arrival.

The jury deliberated for over 40 hours, and the men were acquitted. The length, compared to the first trial, led the deliberation to be called "The Forty Hour Jury". Eventually, Timothy Barrett was acquitted. One Catholic jury member, Mr. Edward Morrogh, of Glanmire, was the chief obstacle on agreeing about the other three - Connors, Wallace, and Lynch. By Tuesday evening, the jury was discharged without reaching a verdict, and it was agreed that the re-trial of the three men would be postponed until the Spring of 1830.

On the morning of Thursday 29 October, two more prisoners were put forward for trial. They were John Burke and John Shine. Shine's brother, William, had been condemned to death at the first trial, while Burke's brother William had ridden to Derrynane. This jury brought in a verdict of not guilty.

== The Trial-Part 3 ==
The final trial was held at the end of March 1830. The three men, Lynch, Connors, and Wallace, about whom the jury had disagreed at the Special Commission, were again tried. Daniel O'Connell was not present. Mr. Deane Freeman defended the prisoners. Connors and Wallace were acquitted, but Lynch was found guilty and transported to New South Wales.

Eventually, the conspiracy trails wound down.

== Daniel O’Connell ==
What ensued went down in local and legal history. For O'Connell, this was his last great trial. It was covered by papers worldwide and is seen as an important part of his national and international legacy. O’Connell’s court career effectively ended in 1830.

== Transportation ==
The men who had been sentenced to hanging were instead transported to Botany Bay in Australia. On 23 April 1830, the five men, John Leary, James McGrath, James Roche, William Shine and Patrick Lynch, were taken with other convicts from the County Gaol in Cork, for transportation to New South Wales.
