= Humphrey Thomas Norrington =

British banker

Humphrey Thomas Norrington OBE is a British music producer who was also vice-chair of Barclays and has been a trustee of various charities including World Vision UK, Mildmay Mission Hospital and Premier Christian Media Trust.

== Family ==
The second son of the publisher and university administrator Sir Arthur Norrington and Edith Carver, he is the younger brother of the conductor Sir Roger Norrington.
