= John Pennefather =

British Army general

General Sir John Pennefather GCB
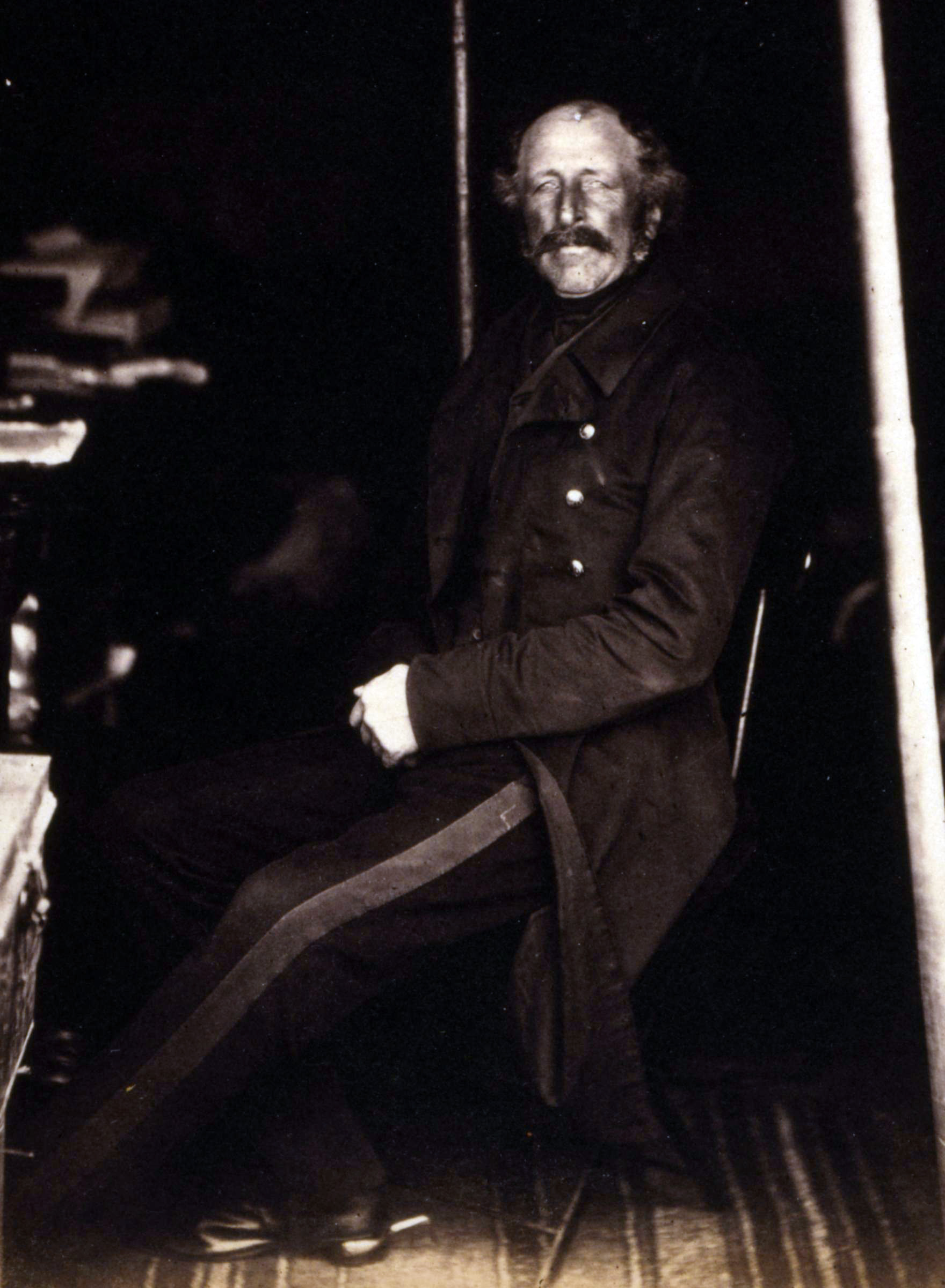
- Pennefather in the Crimea in 1855, photographed by Roger Fenton
- Born: 9 September 1798
- Died: 9 May 1872 (aged 73)
- Military career
- Allegiance: United Kingdom
- Branch: British Army
- Rank: General
- Commands: Northern District; Aldershot Division
- Conflicts: British conquest of Sindh; Crimean War
- Awards: Knight Grand Cross of the Order of the Bath

General Sir John Lysaght Pennefather GCB (9 September 1798 – 9 May 1872) was a British soldier who won two very remarkable victories. First, at Meanee, India, where it was said that 500 British soldiers defeated 35,000 Indians. Second, at the Battle of Inkerman on 5 November 1854 during the Crimean War, where he commanded the 2nd Division, a force of 3,000 soldiers who fought in the fog and played a key role in the defeat of 35,000 Russians.

== Early life ==
He was born on 9 September 1798, the third son of the Rev. John Pennefather of County Tipperary and Elizabeth Percival, and nephew of Richard Pennefather, Baron of the Court of Exchequer (Ireland). The Pennefathers of Darling Hill were a junior branch of a long-established landowning family which came to Ireland in about 1665.

== Career ==
He entered the army on 14 January 1818 as a Cornet in the 7th Dragoon Guards, became a Lieutenant on 20 February 1823, and a Captain on half-pay on 5 November 1825. On 8 April 1826 he was appointed to the 22nd Regiment of Foot (the Cheshire regiment), in which he became Major on 22 March 1831, and Lieutenant-Colonel on 18 October 1839. He rose by the regular grades of promotion without having purchased any of his grades.

Up to this time he had seen no active service, but in 1843 his was the one European regiment in the small force with which Sir Charles Napier won the battle of Miani (Meanee) (17 February), and it bore the brunt of that action, in which two thousand men defeated thirty-five thousand. The battalion was about five hundred strong, nearly all Irishmen, like their Colonel and their General. "The noble soldier, Pennefather" (as Napier described him), fell wounded mortally, it was thought, on the top of the bank that bordered the riverbed and formed the crest of the Baluchis' position. He was made a C.B., and received the thanks of Parliament.

In 1848 he gave up the command of the 22nd regiment, and was placed on half-pay, and in the following year, he was appointed assistant quartermaster-general in the Cork district. In 1854 he was given command of the first brigade of the 2nd Division (Sir De Lacy Evans's) in the army that was dispatched, and on 20 June he was made Major-General.

His brigade consisted of the 30th, 55th, and 95th regiments. He commanded it with credit at the battle of the Alma, and in the affair of 26 October, when a sortie in force was made from Sebastopol against the heights held by the 2nd Division on the extreme right of the allies. But he had more opportunity of distinguishing himself ten days later, when the attack, for which this sortie was only preparatory, was made by the Russians, and the battle of Inkerman was fought (5 November).

Owing to the illness of Evans, Pennefather was in command of the division on that day. He had less than three thousand men under him, while thirty-five thousand Russian infantry were converging upon him. On 26 October Evans had drawn up his force on the ridge immediately in front of the camp of the division, and allowed his pickets to be driven in rather than leave his chosen ground. Pennefather adopted an opposite course. He disputed every inch of ground, kept only a few men in hand on the ridge, but pushed forward all the men he could to support his pickets in resisting the several masses of the enemy. The thickness of the weather favoured these tactics, and the result justified them. As reinforcements, English and French, came up, they were similarly thrown forward by fractions. Lord Raglan was soon on the ground, and Sir De Lacy Evans came up from Balaclava during the course of the morning; but Pennefather was left to direct the fight, so far as any one person could direct it. "Always undaunted, always kindling with warlike animation, he was a very power in himself." Even when his radiant countenance could not be seen, there was comfort in the sound of his voice, "and the 'grand old boys' favourite oaths roaring cheerily down through the smoke".

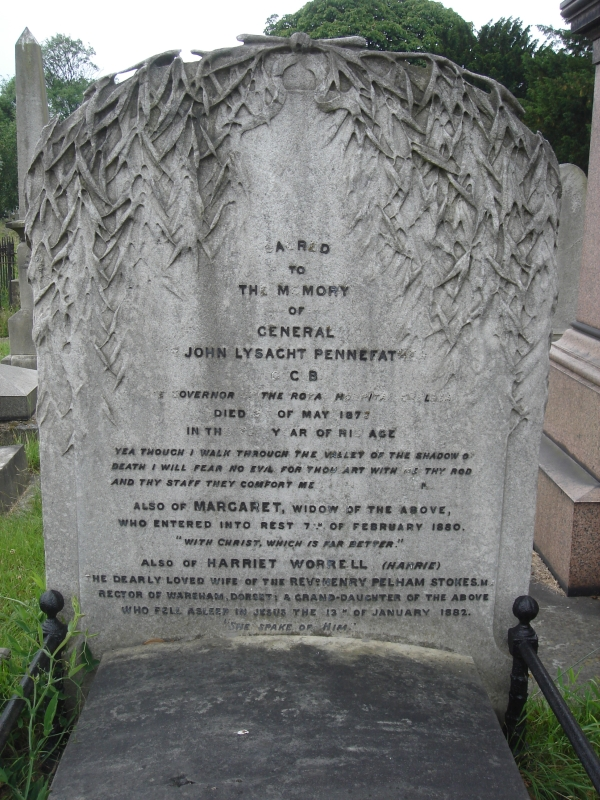
Funerary monument, Brompton Cemetery, London

The battle lasted about six hours from daybreak to 1 p.m. then the Russians began their retreat, having lost nearly twelve thousand men. Pennefather's "admirable behaviour" was mentioned in Lord Raglan's despatch. A fortnight afterwards he was given the colonelcy of the 46th regiment, and he succeeded to the command of the 2nd Division when Evans returned to England in the latter part of November. He was invalided from the Crimea in July 1855, and on 25 September he was appointed to command the troops in Malta, with the local rank of Lieutenant-General. He remained there for nearly five years, and after a short term of service in the Northern District, he commanded Aldershot Division from 1860 to 1865.

He exchanged the colonelcy of the 46th for that of his old regiment, the 22nd, on 13 February 1860. On 12 November of that year he became Lieutenant-General on the establishment, and on 9 May 1868 he became General. He had been made a K.C.B. on 5 July 1855, and received the G.C.B. on 13 May 1867. He was also a commander of the Sardinian Order of St. Maurice and St. Lazarus, a Grand Officer of the Legion of Honour, and in the Second Class of the Order of the Medjidie. He was Governor of the Royal Hospital Chelsea from 1870 until his death in 1872.

He died on 9 May 1872, and was buried in Brompton Cemetery. In 1834 he had married Katherine, eldest daughter of John Carr, Esq., of Mountrath, Queen's County.

Military offices
Preceded by Sir Harry Smith	GOC Northern District; 1859–1860	Succeeded by Sir George Wetherall
Preceded by Sir William Knollys	GOC-in-C Aldershot Division; 1860–1865	Succeeded by Sir James Scarlett
Preceded by Sir William Francis Patrick Napier	Colonel of the 22nd (The Cheshire) Regiment of Foot; 1860–1872	Succeeded by George Thomas Conolly Napier
Honorary titles
Preceded by Sir Alexander Woodford	Governor, Royal Hospital Chelsea; 1870–1872	Succeeded by Sir Sydney Cotton
