= Roger Norrington =

British conductor (1934–2025)

Sir Roger Norrington CBE
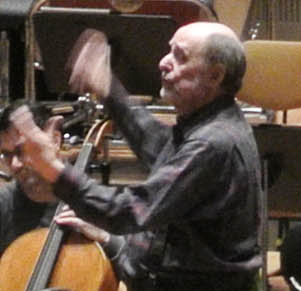
- Norrington conducting at rehearsal
- Born: Roger Arthur Carver Norrington; 16 March 1934; Oxford, England
- Died: 18 July 2025 (aged 91); Devon, England
- Occupations: Conductor; advisor
- Organizations: London Classical Players; Camerata Salzburg; Stuttgart Radio Symphony Orchestra
- Spouses: Susan McLean May (m. 1964; div. 1982); Kay Lawrence (m. 1986; died 2024)
- Children: 3

Sir Roger Arthur Carver Norrington (16 March 1934 – 18 July 2025) was an English conductor, best known for historically informed performances of baroque, classical, and romantic music, which often entailed minimal use of vibrato and applying historically informed principles to modern orchestras.

He was the musical director at the Kent Opera, the London Classical Players, Bournemouth Sinfonietta and Orchestra of St. Luke's. From the 1990s he was the principal conductor of the Camerata Salzburg and Stuttgart Radio Symphony Orchestra, where he developed the "Stuttgart Sound". He was a guest conductor for major orchestras and an advisor to musical societies.

== Life and career ==
Norrington was born in Oxford on 16 March 1934, the son of Edith Joyce (née Carver) and Arthur Norrington, who later became president of Trinity College, Oxford. His younger brother was Humphrey Thomas Norrington. During World War II, the family was evacuated to Canada. Returning when he was age 10, he took violin lessons, and acted in school productions at Dragon School and Westminster School. He then served in the army in Bournemouth as an RAF fighter controller.

Norrington studied history and literature at Clare College, Cambridge from 1954 to 1957, graduating with a Bachelor of Arts. He sang in the Clare College Choir, and studied music simultaneously: violin with Beryl Ireland and voice with Roy Henderson. He then worked for Oxford University Press publishing religious books. He also played as an amateur violinist in an orchestra and in chamber music ensembles, and sang tenor in choirs; he gained opera experience by performing and conducting with the Chelsea Opera Group.

=== Schütz Choir ===
Norrington discovered the music of Heinrich Schütz in the early 1960s, and founded the Schütz Choir (later the Schütz Choir of London) in 1962, planning to perform as much of the composer's music as possible. Keith Falkner, principal of the Royal College of Music, was in the audience at one of their concerts, and encouraged Norrington to study conducting. Norrington resigned his publishing post and studied conducting with Sir Adrian Boult, among others, from 1962 to 1964. The Schütz Choir's first concert with an orchestra on period instruments was Handel's Messiah in 1972, followed by Monteverdi's Vespro della Beata Vergine.

=== Conducting in Great Britain and the US ===
From 1969 to 1984, Norrington was the music director of Kent Opera, where he conducted over 400 performances of more than 40 productions. In 1978, he founded the London Classical Players. Their recording of Beethoven's Symphonies, from 1987 to 1990, caused a sensation by using period instruments, placing the second violins opposite the first, having a different relation of string players to winds and brass, and in fast tempo according to Beethoven's metronome markings. They then explored the repertoire further. Norrington remained their musical director until 1997. From 1985 to 1989, he was the principal conductor of the Bournemouth Sinfonietta. He was also president of the Oxford Bach Choir. From 1990 to 1994, he was music director of the Orchestra of St. Luke's in New York City.

With his wife, the choreographer Kay Lawrence, he formed in 1984 the Early Opera Project to complement his concert work in period-style opera, beginning with Monteverdi's L'Orfeo at the Maggio Musicale Fiorentino that year, and touring Britain in 1986.

=== Salzburg and Stuttgart ===
In Europe, Norrington was the principal conductor of Camerata Salzburg from 1997 to 2007, and the principal conductor of the Stuttgart Radio Symphony Orchestra from 1998 to 2011. On 28 July 2016, he conducted the final concert of the Stuttgart Radio Symphony Orchestra in London at the Royal Albert Hall as part of The Proms, before its scheduled merger with the SWR Sinfonieorchester Baden-Baden und Freiburg.

=== Other activities: Boston, Paris, Bremen, Zurich ===
Norrington was an artistic advisor to the Boston Handel and Haydn Society from 2006 to 2009. He was the principal guest conductor of the Orchestre de chambre de Paris and the Deutsche Kammerphilharmonie Bremen, and the principal conductor of the Zurich Chamber Orchestra from 2011 to 2016. He appeared regularly with the Berlin Philharmonic, the Vienna Philharmonic, and major orchestras throughout the world.

=== Historically informed performance ===
Norrington became best known for historically informed performances of not only Baroque music, but also music from the Classical and Romantic periods. He advocated limited or no use of vibrato in orchestral performances, claiming that orchestras did not use it until the 1930s, which brought him controversial criticism. He followed Beethoven's original metronome markings in his symphonies strictly, rejecting the common speculation that these markings were "miscalculated". With sparse use of vibrato, often very fast tempos, and a different placement of the instruments, especially first and second violins on opposite sides of the podium, he developed a specific sound, especially with the Stuttgart Radio Symphony Orchestra, which was often dubbed by the trade press as Stuttgart Sound. This refers to the synthesis of historically informed music making with the means of a flexible modern orchestra. Symphonic cycles that Norrington interpreted with the orchestra have received worldwide acclaim. Critics included Hermann Voss, the violist of the Melos Quartet, who drew two tough caricatures of Norrington's vibrato-free string sound in 2005, adding: "Except for the Stuttgart Feuilleton, the New Stuttgart Style finds only contempt and scorn."

=== Television ===
In August 2008, Norrington appeared in the reality TV talent show-themed television series Maestro on BBC Two, leading the judging panel. He conducted the First Night of The Proms in 2006 and the Last Night of The Proms in 2008.

=== Personal life ===
Norrington was married twice. He married Susan McLean May in 1964, with whom he had two children. The couple divorced in 1982. In 1986, he married Kay Lawrence, a dancer and choreographer; the couple had one child.

In November 2021, Norrington announced his retirement.

Norrington, who lived near Exeter in Devon, died at home on 18 July 2025, aged 91.

== Awards and honours ==
Norrington was appointed OBE in 1980, CBE in 1990, and Knight Bachelor in 1997. He was awarded the Cavaliere of the Italian Republic in 1980 and the Order of Merit of the Federal Republic of Germany in 2012.

=== Honorary doctorates ===
- 1991 University of York
- 1995 University of Kent
- 2016 Royal College of Music and 1997 Prince Consort Professor of Historical Performance

== Recordings ==
Norrington conducted recordings of Haydn, Mozart, Beethoven, Schubert, Berlioz, Brahms, Tchaikovsky, Dvorak, Bruckner, and Mahler on both period and modern instruments.

=== Decca ===
Recordings with Decca Records include:

- Heroes, 1999, with Andreas Scholl and the Orchestra of the Age of Enlightenment OCLC 1454977512
- Bach: Cantatas Nos. 82, 158 & 56, 1999, with Matthias Goerne and Camerata Salzburg OCLC 44119025

=== EMI ===
- The Rossini Bicentennial Birthday Gala, 1994 OCLC 659123457

=== Erato Records ===
Recordings with Erato Records include:

- The Complete Erato Recordings, 2022, OCLC 1353602532
- Brahms: Symphonies Nos. 1–4, 2022, with London Classical Players (LCP) OCLC 1371105826
- Brahms: Symphony No. 2, Haydn-Variationen & Tragische Ouvertüre, 2022, LCP OCLC 1371107276
- Mozart: Don Giovanni (Prague Version), 2022, LCP OCLC 1371111381
- Bruckner: Symphony No. 3 "Wagner Symphony" (1873 Version), 2022, LCP OCLC 1371112921
- Wagner: Preludes & Overtures, 2022, LCP OCLC 1371111519
- Schubert: Symphony No. 9 "The Great" & Rosamunde Overture, 2022, LCP OCLC 1371111479
- Mozart: Don Giovanni (Vienna Version), 2022
- Weber: Symphonies Nos. 1 & 2, Konzertstück & Oberon Overture, 2022 LCP OCLC 1371108490
- Beethoven: Choral Fantasy & Piano Concertos Nos. 3 & 5, 2022, Schütz Choir, Melvyn Tan (piano), LCP OCLC 1350739105
- Beethoven: Symphony No. 9 "Choral" & Egmont Overture, 2022, Schütz Choir, LCP OCLC 1350738363
- Schumann: Symphonies Nos. 3 & 4, 2018, LPC OCLC 885040349
- Brahms, Mozart: Requiem, 2013
- Mozart: Requiem, Ave verum corpus, 2013 Schütz Choir, LCP OCLC 900166389
- Beethoven Symphonies & Concertos, 2011
- Mozart: Requiem, Ave verum corpus, 2011
- Haydn: Symphonies Nos. 99–104, 2010, LPC OCLC 1077734021
- Schubert: Symphonies 4–6, 8, Rosamunde, 2003, LPC OCLC 961806246
- Beethoven: Complete Symphonies, 1998

=== Sony Classical Records ===
Recordings with Sony Classical Records include:

- Beethoven and Mendelssohn Violin Concertos, 2002 with Joshua Bell (violin), Camerata Salzburg OCLC 314084714

=== SWR Classic ===
Recordings with SWR Classic, with the Stuttgart Radio Symphony Orchestra, include:

- Beethoven: Overtures, 2022, OCLC 1373413474
- Beethoven: Complete Symphonies (Live), 2020, Gächinger Kantorei OCLC 1255958866
- Beethoven: Missa Solemnis In D Major, Op. 123, 2007, NDR Chor, SWR Vokalensemble OCLC 840104675
- Beethoven: Symphonies Nos. 1–8 (Fragments), 2003 OCLC 1444814926

Cultural offices
Preceded by Ronald Thomas	Principal Conductor, Bournemouth Sinfonietta; 1985–1989	Succeeded by Tamás Vásáry
Preceded by no predecessor	Music Director, Orchestra of St. Luke's; 1990–1994	Succeeded by Sir Charles Mackerras
Preceded by Sándor Végh	Principal Conductor, Camerata Salzburg; 1997–2006	Succeeded by Leonidas Kavakos
Preceded by Muhai Tang	Principal Conductor, Zurich Chamber Orchestra; 2011–2016	Succeeded by Daniel Hope
