= Arthur Norrington =

British publisher and Vice-Chancellor

Sir Arthur Lionel Pugh Norrington
- Norrington in 1956
- Born: 27 October 1899; Kenley, Surrey, England
- Died: 21 May 1982 (aged 82); Oxford, Oxfordshire, England
- Occupations: Publisher, Vice Chancellor of Oxford University
- Spouse: Edith Joyce Carver
- Children: Roger Arthur Carver Norrington

Sir Arthur Lionel Pugh Norrington (27 October 1899 – 21 May 1982) was a British publisher, President of Trinity College, Oxford, Vice-Chancellor of Oxford University, and creator, in 1963, of a scoring system for The Times' table of Oxford colleges' examination results which since then has been known as the Norrington Table.

== Early life ==
Norrington was born at Normandy Villa, Godstone Road, Kenley, Surrey, England, the only son and eldest child of Arthur James Norrington, a merchant in the City of London, and his wife, Gertrude Sarah Elizabeth, daughter of William Pugh, a merchant from Montgomeryshire. He was a scholar at Winchester College from 1913, where he earned the nickname Thomas because of his scepticism of received lore. In 1918, he enlisted with the Royal Field Artillery and though he did not see active service, he lost a little finger in an accident. In 1919, he matriculated as a scholar to Trinity College, Oxford, achieving a first class in classical Honour Moderations in 1920, followed by a second in Literae Humaniores in 1923.

== Career ==
Moving to London, he worked for the Oxford University Press, who posted him to their branch in India. Returning to Oxford in 1925, he took the post of junior assistant secretary to the Delegates of the Press. Norrington became assistant secretary to the Delegates of Oxford University Press in 1942; in 1948, he took the post of senior administrative officer of the Press and was elected a professorial fellow of Trinity College. Norrington focussed on expanding the range of the Press's educational books, particularly the successful 'Great Wartime Series' Oxford Pamphlets. He was instrumental in expanding the Press' recognition outside Oxford University. Norrington was a keen musician and contributed a great deal to the Press' music publishing as well as being a member of the Oxford Bach Choir, he became chairman of its committee in 1949.

In 1952, he was invited to become the next president of Trinity College, which he accepted and took up in 1954. He took the affairs of the University seriously, both on the council and on the general board. He also held a post on the revising committee for the New English Bible, and in 1960 became the first chairman of the government committee for the publication of cheap books abroad. His name in Oxford is remembered for having devised the Norrington Table, a system of assessing the results of the Oxford colleges in final examinations, the table continues to be compiled and the results published in the national press.

In 1960, Norrington became Vice-Chancellor of Oxford University and proceeded to spend time looking at the status of dons who were not fellows of colleges, and to the future planning of the Science Area. In 1968, he received a knighthood.

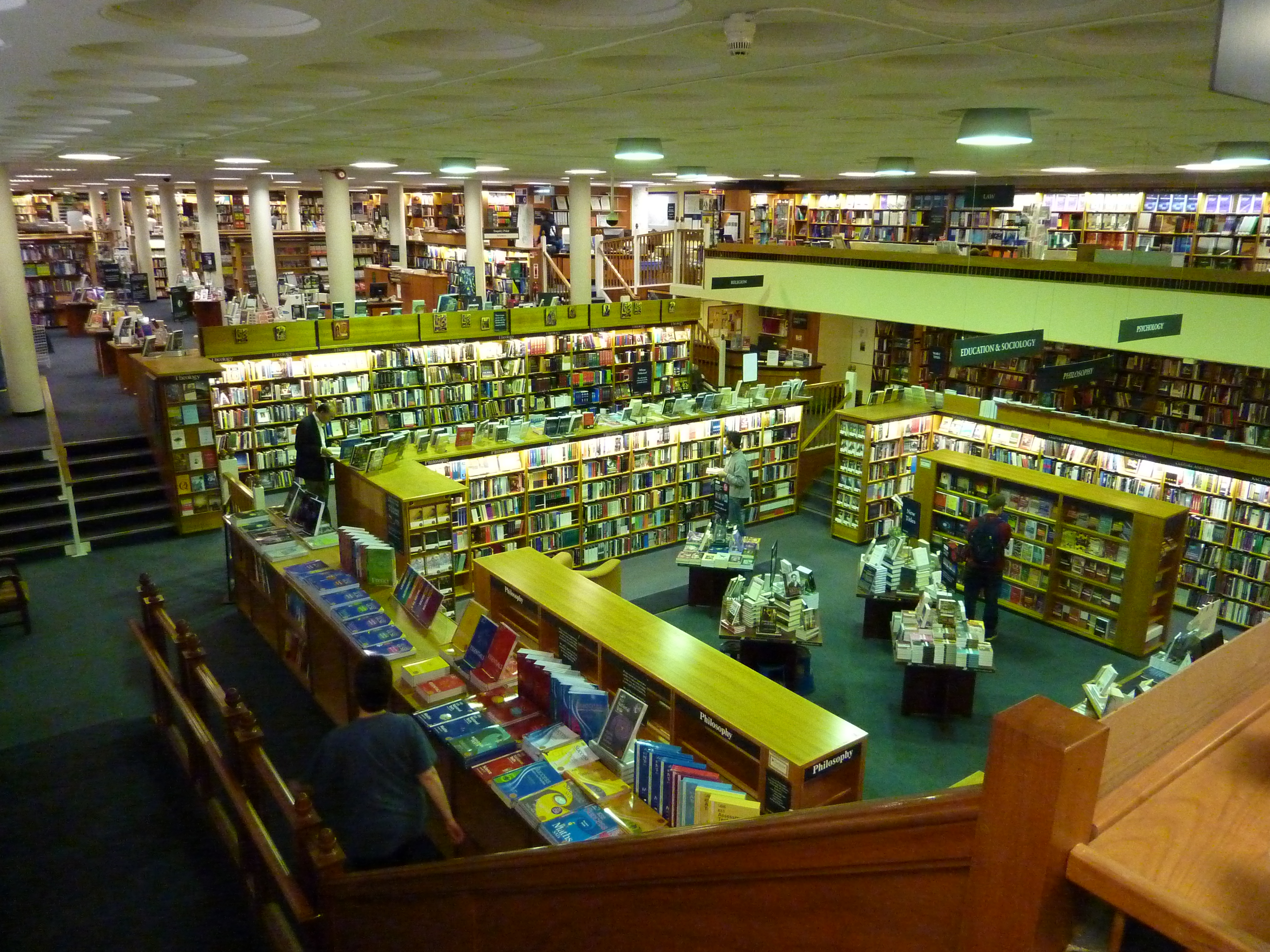
The 10,000 square feet (930 m^{2}) underground Norrington Room in Blackwell's bookshop in Oxford contains more than 160,000 books on over three miles of shelving.

As well as publishing, with professors H. F. Lowry and F. L. Mulhauser, an edition of the poems of Arthur Hugh Clough in 1951, he wrote Blackwell's, 1879–1979: the history of a family firm, published posthumously in 1983. Retiring from Trinity in 1970, he became Warden of Winchester College until 1974.

== Awards and legacy ==
He was made an honorary fellow of Trinity, St Cross College, and Wolfson College. He became an officer of the Légion d'honneur in 1962.

Blackwell's bookshop in Broad Street, Oxford created a large room in 1966 under Trinity College land and named it the "Norrington Room" after him.

== Inspiration for other ranking tables ==
As well as the Norrington Table, other tables ranking different Oxford colleges have drawn upon Norrington's name, such as the "Vegetarian Norrington Table". First published in 2016, this table ranked the best and worst colleges in Oxford for their vegetarian and vegan food, using data provided by students of the University. The use of Norrington's name in this table was not without controversy, however, and drew criticism from a number of college bursars.

== Personal life ==
Norrington married Edith Joyce Carver on 15 September 1928 and were the parents of the conductor Sir Roger Arthur Carver Norrington (1934−2025) and the music producer Humphrey Thomas Norrington. Edith died at an early age in 1964 and on 9 December 1969 Norrington married Ruth (née Cude, later Davies, then Waterlow) - after Sir Arthur died she married the retired diplomat Sir Patrick Reilly.

Norrington died in the John Radcliffe Hospital, Oxford, on 21 May 1982.

Academic offices
Preceded by John Weaver	President of Trinity College, Oxford; 1954–1970	Succeeded by Alexander George Ogston
Preceded by T. S. R. Boase	Vice-Chancellor of Oxford University; 1960–1962	Succeeded by Walter Fraser Oakeshott
