= Norrington Table =

Table that ranks Oxford Colleges

The Norrington Table is a ranking of the colleges of the University of Oxford based on a score computed from the proportions of undergraduate students earning each of the various degree classifications based on that year's final examinations. Rankings were last published by the university in 2022 but undergraduates continue to be members of colleges and receive degree classifications meaning that rankings can still be calculated.

== Overview ==
The rankings of each college in the Norrington Table may be calculated by awarding 5 points for a student who receives a First Class degree, 3 points for a 2:1, 2 points for a 2:2 and 1 point for a Third Class degree; the total is then divided by the maximum possible score (i.e. the number of finalists in that college multiplied by 5), and the result for each college is expressed as a percentage, rounded to 1 or 2 decimal places.

Initially the University declined to endorse an official table, leading to inaccuracies (see Criticisms below), until Oxford finally published its own rankings using examination results from all final year undergraduates in 2005.

In November 2024, the Conference of Colleges expressed disapproval of the system, stating that the Norrington Table did not "encapsulate the added value given by college teaching" and that "it [did not] relate to differences at the level of specific degree courses”, evidence of the system being unfit for purpose. Discussions as to a replacement system are ongoing.

However, the Norrington Table can be constructed by anyone wishing to look at the continuity of results. If the data is not published by the University, the examination results by college can be obtained by submitting a freedom of information (FOI) request. Data for 2023 and 2024, for example, is available at the WhatDoTheyKnow website that records FOI requests.

== History ==
Contrary to popular belief, the Norrington Table was not created in 1962 by Sir Arthur Norrington, who was then president of Trinity College. Norrington did not invent the idea of producing a table of the results of Oxford colleges. Rather, he suggested a refinement to the weightings given to results in an existing table. Norrington's scoring system was suggested in 1963 and abandoned after 1985, owing to changes in the Oxford examination system.

On 5 September 1963, Norrington had a letter published in The Times, in which he objected to the table that their correspondent had published two days earlier (3 September 1963, p. 12). The Times had previously published a table of Oxford colleges' results in 1962 (29 August 1962, p. 5).

Norrington wrote: "Your Correspondent has analysed the final examination results this year and gives an order of merit, among the first colleges, based on the percentage of Firsts and Seconds. This, in effect, is the same as basing it on the percentage of Thirds, and gives it no extra credit for Firsts. College A, for example, that gets 20 Firsts, 60 Seconds, and 20 Thirds scores less by this method than College B that gets no Firsts, 81 Seconds and 19 Thirds, but surely A has, in reality, done much better than B. A better result, I submit, is obtained by a points system in which a First scores more than a second and a Second more than a Third. If you make the points 3, 2, and 1 respectively and calculate what percentage of its "possible" each college has secured, you will find that College A, with 200 points out of 300, has scored 66.67 per cent, and B, with 181, only 60 per cent. This method of calculation will be found to promote Magdalen and Merton, which come surprisingly low in your Correspondent's order." (5 September 1963, p. 13)

In 1986, when Oxford for the first time split Second Class honours into Upper Seconds and Lower Seconds, The Times unilaterally adopted the Tompkins Table, which gives more weight to a First class degree: five points for a First, three for a 2.1, two for a 2.2, and one for a Third. This system was devised in 1981 by Peter Tompkins, of Birkenhead, to classify the results of Cambridge colleges, and a table compiled by Tompkins on this basis was published on 28 August by The Times (28 Aug 1981, p. 10) alongside a table using the Norrington scoring system, which had been compiled by the Cambridge Evening News. The Tompkins Table became the preferred rating for Cambridge colleges and has prevailed for Oxford colleges as well since 1986.

=== Recent rankings ===
Below is the Norrington Table for the academic years 2023/24 2022/23 2021/22 and 2019/20 along with mean values for the period 2006 to 2019. The results for 2022/23 and 2023/24 make use of data released by the University in response to a freedom of information request submitted to it (see note 2). St Benet's closed after 2022.

College/ Hall	2024 Score %	2023 Score %	2022 Score %	2020 Score %	Mean Score (2006–2019) %
Merton	77.3	75.9	80.9	81.0	75.60
Lincoln	73.7	73.8	80.7	79.5	71.06
Harris Manchester	73.1	73.8	77.7	77.4	65.90
Queen's	70.6	77.6	77.7	81.7	69.90
St Peter's	73.0	71.2	77.6	81.5	67.94
St Catherine's	72.5	73.4	77.2	82.5	70.48
Wadham	72.7	74.1	76.8	80.9	71.91
St John's	76.6	74.5	76.5	80.2	74.49
Somerville	68.5	70.6	76.4	72.8	68.27
Pembroke	68.2	72.2	75.8	78.0	69.03
Keble	75.8	75.7	75.8	76.6	69.65
Magdalen	77.9	74.5	75.7	77.4	75.42
Mansfield	73.0	69.4	75.6	75.5	68.44
New College	76.2	75.0	75.5	83.5	74.65
Brasenose	73.1	76.2	74.9	80.4	70.81
Worcester	68.5	72.0	74.4	78.8	71.52
Oriel	67.7	68.0	74.3	79.8	69.54
University	69.8	73.9	74.1	78.9	70.85
St Hilda's	68.8	72.4	73.9	78.3	67.99
Balliol	71.9	68.0	73.7	78.6	72.62
Corpus Christi	66.3	68.6	73.6	77.0	71.00
St Anne's	70.8	71.5	72.8	77.0	69.51
Christ Church	71.5	75.0	72.5	75.6	72.02
St Edmund Hall	66.8	72.5	71.8	76.5	68.08
St Benet's Hall	00.0	00.0	71.7	69.5	62.76
St Hugh's	70.0	73.1	71.2	78.8	68.55
Hertford	68.6	72.8	70.6	79.2	70.39
Trinity	70.0	71.2	70.3	79.1	71.30
Lady Margaret Hall	69.2	71.9	69.7	75.7	68.11
Jesus	75.7	69.6	68.5	78.0	71.26
Exeter	74.6	70.7	68.0	75.8	69.09
Wycliffe Hall	64.7	60.0	60.0	63.6	67.43
Regent's Park	67.5	69.6	68.9	74.3	64.13
St Stephen's House	80.0	60.0	50.0	80.0	59.46

=== Past rankings ===
Norrington Table rankings from 2006 to 2019 by college, ordered by mean rank, and omitting all PPHs since they take very few undergraduates, with the exception of Regent's Park:

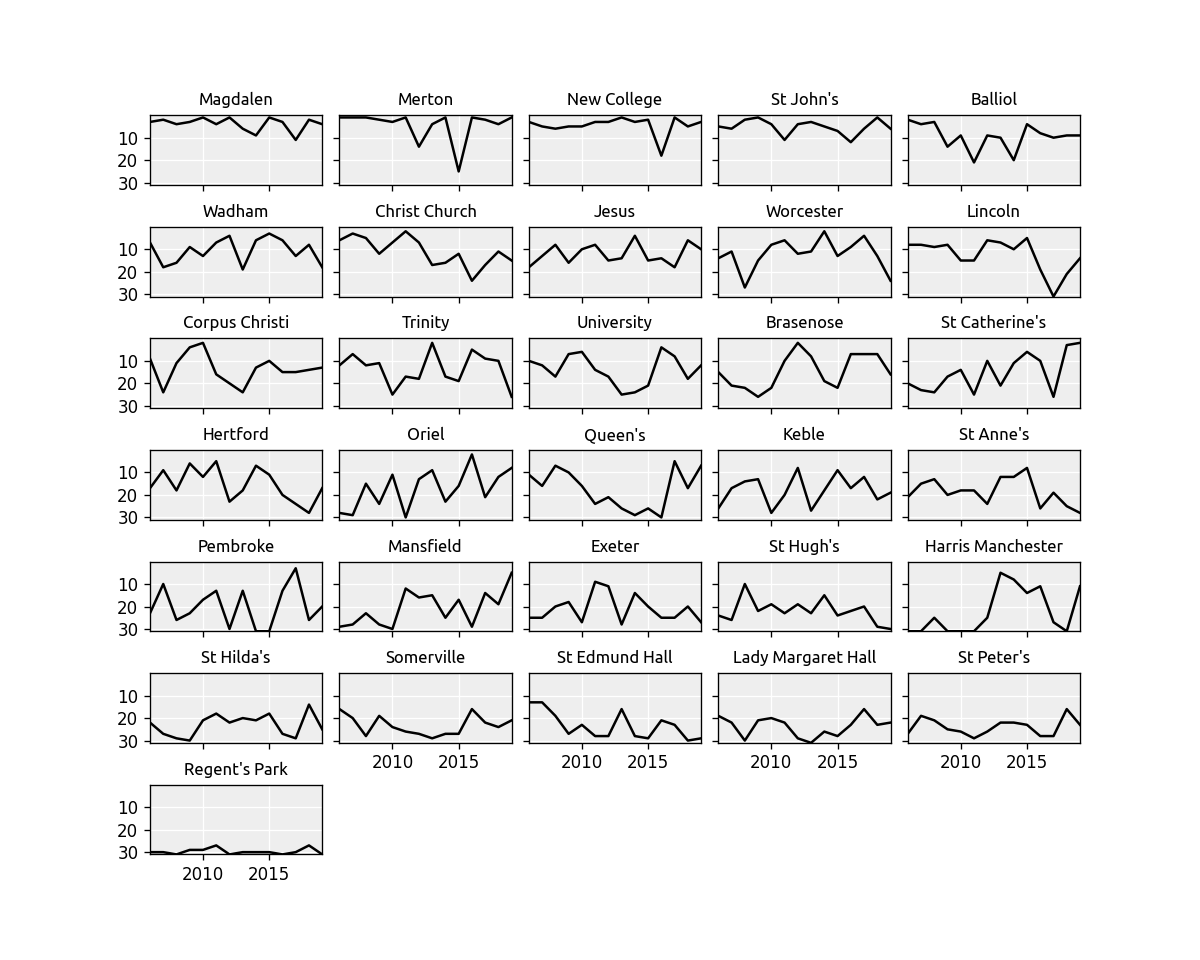

== Criticisms ==
The table is biased towards colleges with above average proportions of students in science subjects such as chemistry and mathematics, in which a higher proportion attain a first-class degree compared to subjects such as Law or PPE (in which more students attain a 2:1). The corresponding Tompkins Table at Cambridge makes an adjustment for this feature.

John Lucas, Fellow of Merton, presented a critique of the Norrington Table in a 1980 article titled "Norrington Blues".

== Other tables and debate over use of Norrington name ==
The Norrington Table has inspired other tables ranking the performance of Oxford colleges, such as the "Vegetarian Norrington Table", which was first published in 2016. A play on the original, the Vegetarian Norrington Table ranks the best and worst colleges in Oxford not for their undergraduate examination results, but for the quality of their vegetarian and vegan food, using data collected from staff and students of the University. The table caused some controversy, however, as a number of college bursars argued that it bore no relation to the original and further questioned its metrics. The current top-ranked college in the Vegetarian Norrington Table is Mansfield College, followed by Worcester College, with Kellogg College in third.

There have been attempts to rework the original Norrington Table, specifically in light of debates surrounding access and the equality of Oxford University § Admission process. In 2018, one article used geographical data to rank colleges based on the percentage of undergraduate students from less affluent backgrounds. In this same report, the Vice President of the Oxford University Student Union announced work was underway on an "alternative Norrington Table" which would seek to measure social mobility as well as academic success in colleges. Only Oxford’s independent Examination Boards release factual results, however, meaning that any ranking system must work with degree classifications in order to be credible. Publication of the table enables prospective applicants to compare colleges if they so wish.

== See also ==
- Tompkins Table
