= Catherine Pennefather =

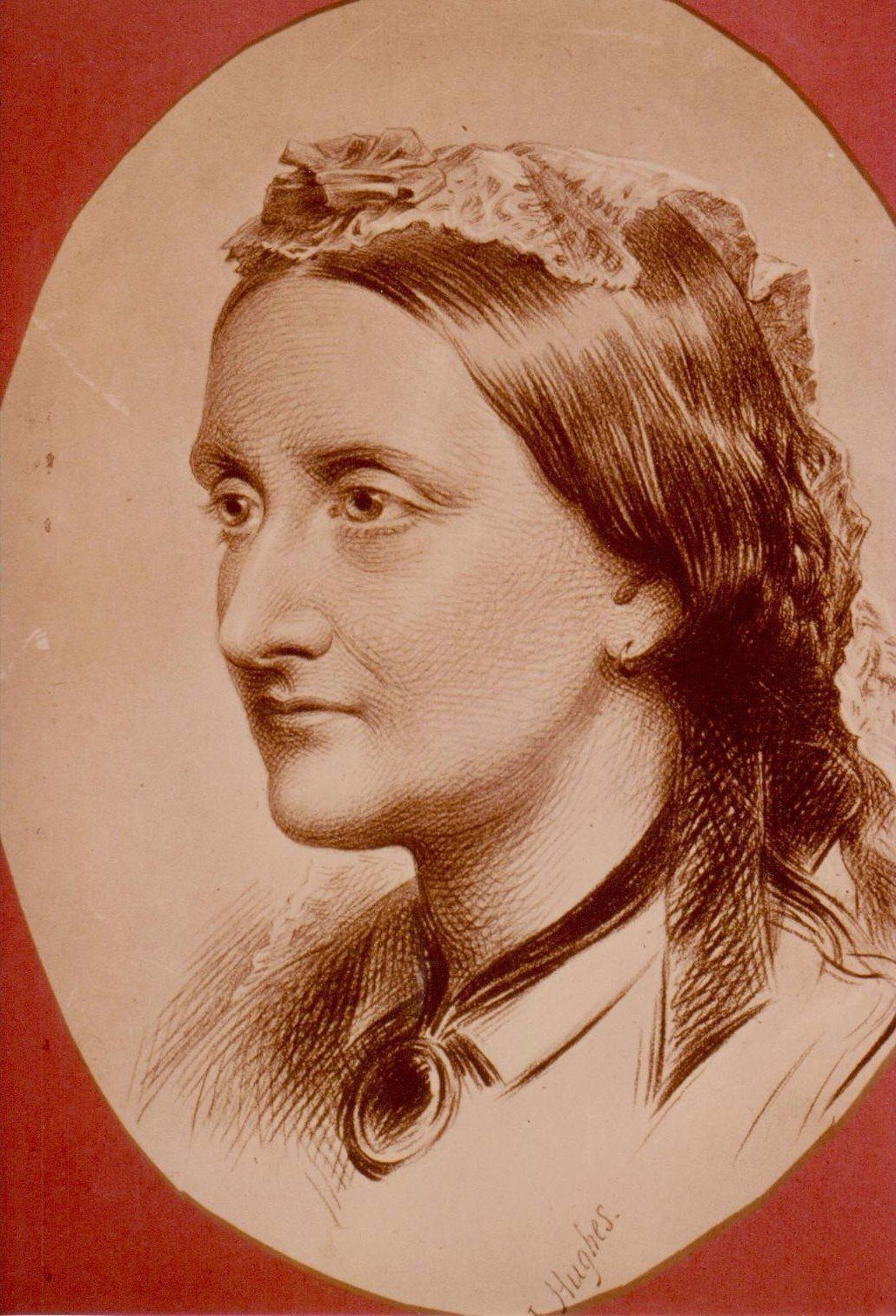
- Born: Catherine King c. 1818; Fulham
- Died: 12 January 1893; Islington
- Known for: mission work
- Spouse: William Pennefather
- Children: none
- Parent(s): James King, Caroline Cleaver

Catherine Pennefather born Catherine King (c. 1818 – 12 January 1893) was an English home mission worker. She was president of the Association of Female Workers, and she edited a magazine and wrote. She created a cottage hospital in Bethnal Green.

== Life ==
Pennefather was born about 1818 in Fulham. Her father was Rear Admiral James William King, son of the Earl of Kingston, and her mother was Caroline Cleaver, the daughter of Euseby Cleaver, the Archbishop of Dublin and his wife Catherine Wynne.

In 1847 she married William Pennefather, an Anglican minister. She participated fully in her husband's work and was regarded as an equal partner. He was appointed as the perpetual curate to Holy Trinity Church, Walton near Aylesbury in 1848. In 1852 she and William moved to Barnet.

She also wrote several hymns.

From 1858 she was president of the Association of Female Workers, connected first with Barnet and then with the Mildmay area of Islington. She worked again with orphans in 1872. Her husband died on 30 April 1873 at their home in Muswell Hill. The Mildmay Mission Hospital was credited to him and his deaconesses, but it was opened four years after he died by a dozen women including Catherine in an old warehouse near the church in Shoreditch. The hospital had a doctor, 27 beds, three nurses and five deaconesses in training.

In 1876 she opened a mission to the Jews, and the following year she created a medical mission in Bethnal Green. A cottage hospital followed in 1883. Catherine has been credited with bringing together the Working Girls' Institute which was founded in 1855 to link those engaged in social work for girls in 1877 which led to the creation of the Y.W.C.A. The YMCA's main offices were in Mildmay until 1884. Other sources credit Emma Robarts and Lady Mary Jane Kinnaird. Pennefather was engaged in training deaconesses for the mission including Maud Cattell in 1886 who went to lead Mildmay Mission Hospital.

Pennefather died in Islington on 12 January 1893. She had survived William by nearly twenty years. They had no children.
