= Second Peel ministry =

Government of the United Kingdom

- 1841–1846
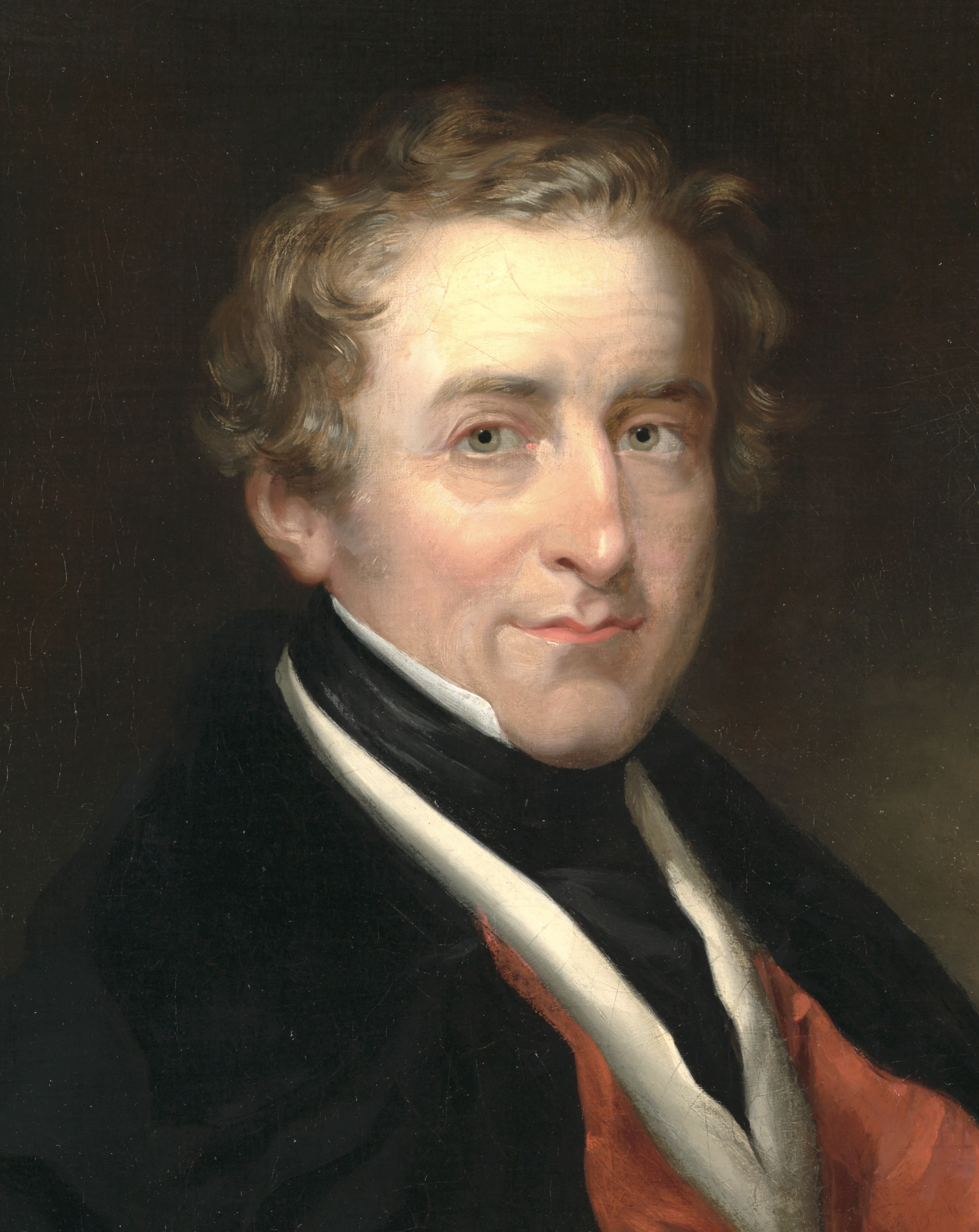
- Peel by Robert Richard Scanlan
- Date formed: 30 August 1841
- Date dissolved: 29 June 1846

People and organisations
- Monarch: Queen Victoria
- Prime Minister: Sir Robert Peel
- Member parties: Conservative Party
- Opposition party: Whigs
- Opposition leaders: Lord John Russell in the House of Commons; The Viscount Melbourne (1841–1842); The Marquess of Lansdowne (1842–1846) in the House of Lords

History
- Election: 1841 general election
- Predecessor: Second Melbourne ministry
- Successor: First Russell ministry

The second Peel ministry was formed by Sir Robert Peel in the United Kingdom of Great Britain and Ireland in 1841.

== History ==
Peel came to power for a second time after the Conservative victory in the General Election caused the Whig government of Lord Melbourne to resign.

Henry Goulburn was Chancellor of the Exchequer, the future Prime Minister Lord Aberdeen Foreign Secretary and Sir James Graham Home Secretary. William Gladstone, who was yet to join the Liberal Party, became a member of the cabinet for the first time in 1843 when he was appointed President of the Board of Trade. His future rival Benjamin Disraeli was overlooked by Peel and was a sharp critic of the government.

The government was brought down by Peel's decision in 1846 to support the repeal of the Corn Laws, leading to a split in the Tory party and the formation of a Whig government under Lord John Russell.

== Cabinet ==
=== September 1841 – July 1846 ===
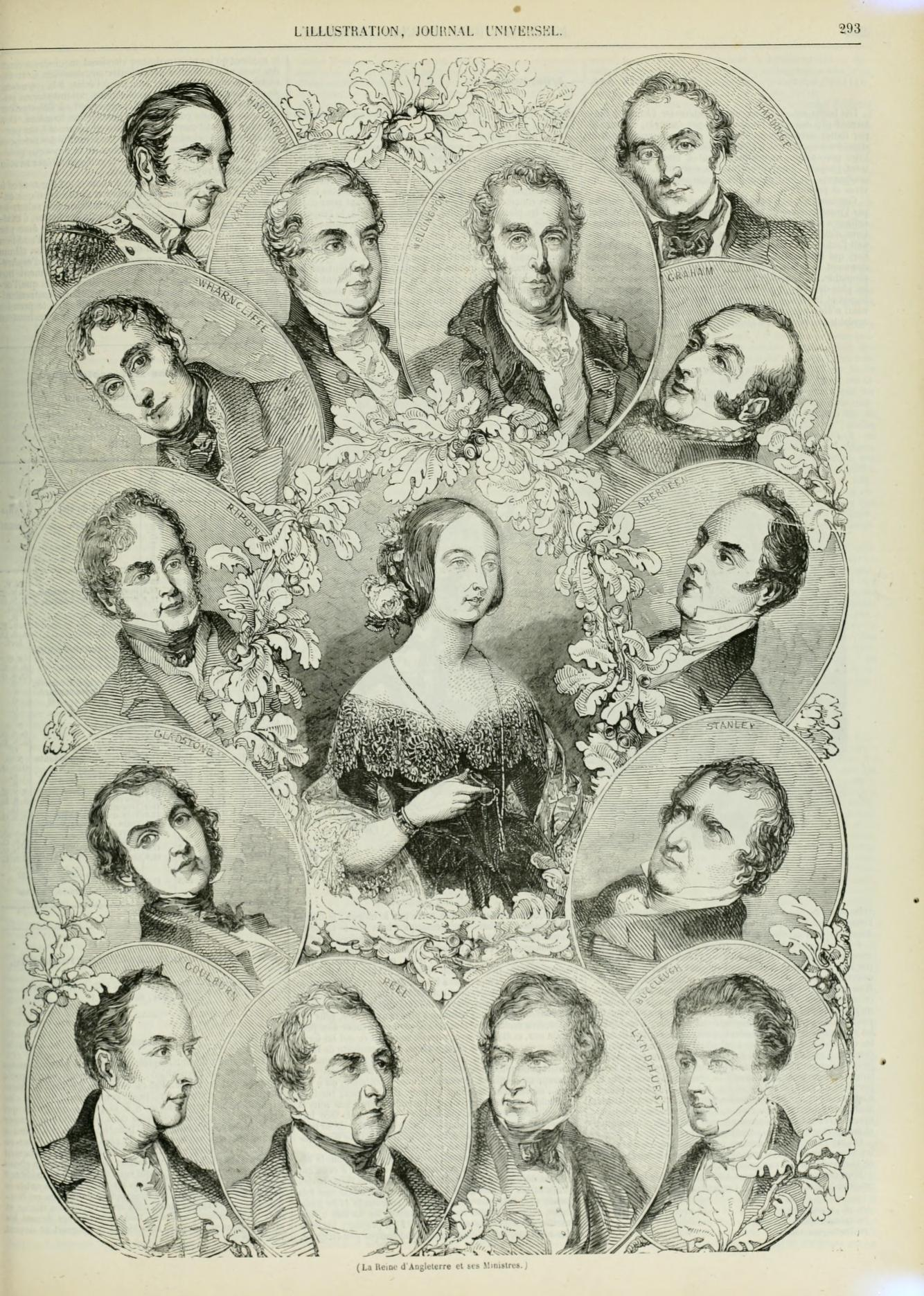
Contemporary engraving showing the members of the Peel ministry

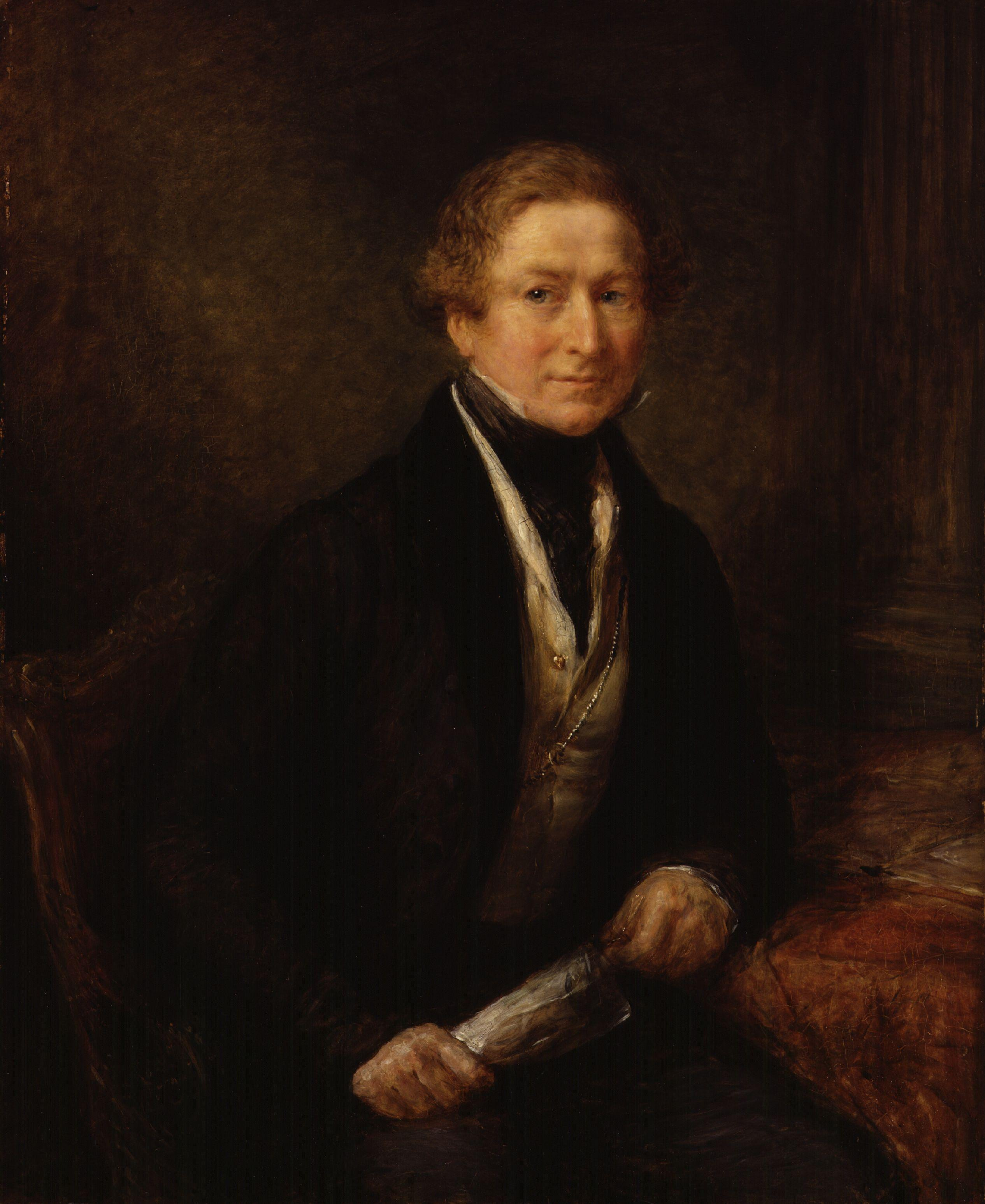
Portrait of Sir Robert Peel by John Linnell

Office	Name	Term
First Lord of the Treasury; Leader of the House of Commons	Sir Robert Peel	September 1841 – July 1846
Lord Chancellor	John Copley, 1st Baron Lyndhurst	September 1841 – July 1846
Lord President of the Council	James Stuart-Wortley-Mackenzie, 1st Baron Wharncliffe	September 1841 – December 1845
	Walter Montagu-Douglas-Scott, 5th Duke of Buccleuch	December 1845 – July 1846
Lord Privy Seal	Richard Temple-Nugent-Brydges-Chandos-Grenville, 2nd Duke of Buckingham and Chandos	September 1841 – February 1842
	Walter Montagu-Douglas-Scott, 5th Duke of Buccleuch	February 1842 – January 1846
	Thomas Hamilton, 9th Earl of Haddington	January–July 1846
Home Secretary	Sir James Graham, 2nd Baronet	September 1841 – July 1846
Foreign Secretary	George Hamilton-Gordon, 4th Earl of Aberdeen	September 1841 – July 1846
Secretary of State for War and the Colonies	Edward Smith-Stanley, Baron Stanley	September 1841 – December 1845
	William Gladstone	December 1845 – July 1846
First Lord of the Admiralty	Thomas Hamilton, 9th Earl of Haddington	September 1841 – January 1846
	Edward Law, 1st Earl of Ellenborough	January–July 1846
Chancellor of the Exchequer	Henry Goulburn	September 1841 – July 1846
President of the Board of Control	Edward Law, 2nd Baron Ellenborough	September–October 1841
	William Vesey-FitzGerald, 2nd Baron FitzGerald and Vesey	October 1841 – May 1843
	Frederick Robinson, 1st Earl of Ripon	May 1843 – July 1846
President of the Board of Trade	Frederick Robinson, 1st Earl of Ripon	September 1841 – May 1843
	William Gladstone	May 1843 – January 1845
First Commissioner of Woods and Forests	Henry Pelham-Clinton, Earl of Lincoln	February 1845 – January 1846
Chancellor of the Duchy of Lancaster	Lord Granville Somerset	May 1844 – July 1846
Secretary at War	Sir Henry Hardinge	September 1841 – January 1845
	Sidney Herbert	January 1845 – July 1846
Paymaster General	Sir Edward Knatchbull, 9th Baronet	September 1841 – January 1845
Chief Secretary for Ireland	Henry Pelham-Clinton, Earl of Lincoln	January–July 1846
Minister without Portfolio; Leader of the House of Lords	Arthur Wellesley, 1st Duke of Wellington	September 1841 – July 1846

==== Changes ====
- October 1841: Lord FitzGerald succeeds Lord Ellenborough as President of the Board of Control.
- February 1842: The Duke of Buccleuch succeeds the Duke of Buckingham as Lord Privy Seal.
- May 1843: Lord Ripon succeeds FitzGerald as President of the Board of Control. William Gladstone succeeds Ripon at the Board of Trade.
- May 1844: Lord Granville Somerset, Chancellor of the Duchy of Lancaster, enters the Cabinet. Sir Henry Hardinge leaves the cabinet. His successor as Secretary at War is not in the Cabinet.
- February 1845: William Gladstone resigns as President of the Board of Trade. His successor in that post is not in the Cabinet. The First Commissioner of Woods and Forests, Lord Lincoln, enters the Cabinet, while Sir Edward Knatchbull, the Paymaster, leaves it.
- May 1845: Sidney Herbert, the Secretary at War, enters the Cabinet.
- December 1845: Gladstone succeeds Lord Stanley as Secretary for War and the Colonies.
- January 1846: The Duke of Buccleuch succeeds Lord Wharnecliffe as Lord President. Lord Haddington succeeds Buccleuch as Lord Privy Seal. Ellenborough succeeds Haddington as First Lord of the Admiralty. Lincoln becomes Chief Secretary for Ireland. His successor as First Commissioner of Woods and Forests is not in the Cabinet.

== List of ministers ==
Members of the Cabinet are indicated by bold face.

Office	Name	Date
Prime Minister First Lord of the Treasury Leader of the House of Commons	Sir Robert Peel	30 August 1841 – 29 June 1846 (Note: Resigned 6 December 1845 and resumed 20 December 1845.)
Chancellor of the Exchequer	Henry Goulburn	4 September 1841
Parliamentary Secretary to the Treasury	Sir Thomas Fremantle	8 September 1841
Parliamentary Secretary to the Treasury	John Young	21 May 1844
Financial Secretary to the Treasury	Sir George Clerk, 6th Baronet	8 September 1841
Financial Secretary to the Treasury	Edward Cardwell	4 February 1845
Junior Lords of the Treasury	James Milnes Gaskell	6 September 1841 – 11 March 1846
Junior Lords of the Treasury	Henry Bingham Baring	6 September 1841 – 27 June 1846
Junior Lords of the Treasury	Alexander Perceval	6 September 1841 – 16 September 1841
Junior Lords of the Treasury	Alexander Pringle	6 September 1841 – 26 April 1845
Junior Lords of the Treasury	John Young	16 September 1841 – 21 May 1844
Junior Lords of the Treasury	Lord Arthur Lennox	21 May 1844 – 8 August 1845
Junior Lords of the Treasury	William Forbes Mackenzie	26 April 1845 – 11 March 1846
Junior Lords of the Treasury	William Cripps	8 August 1845 – 27 June 1846
Junior Lords of the Treasury	Swynfen Carnegie	11 March 1846 – 27 June 1846
Junior Lords of the Treasury	Ralph Neville	11 March 1846 – 27 June 1846
Lord Chancellor	John Singleton Copley, 1st Baron Lyndhurst	3 September 1841
Lord President of the Council	James Stuart-Wortley-Mackenzie, 1st Baron Wharncliffe	3 September 1841
Lord President of the Council	Walter Montagu-Douglas-Scott, 5th Duke of Buccleuch	21 January 1846
Lord Privy Seal	Richard Temple-Grenville, 2nd Duke of Buckingham and Chandos	3 September 1841
Lord Privy Seal	Walter Montagu-Douglas-Scott, 5th Duke of Buccleuch	2 February 1842
Lord Privy Seal	Thomas Hamilton, 9th Earl of Haddington	21 January 1846
Secretary of State for the Home Department	Sir James Graham, 2nd Baronet	3 September 1841
Under-Secretary of State for the Home Department	John Manners-Sutton	3 September 1841
Secretary of State for Foreign Affairs	George Hamilton-Gordon, 4th Earl of Aberdeen	3 September 1841
Parliamentary Under-Secretary of State for Foreign Affairs	Charles Canning, 2nd Viscount Canning	4 September 1841
Parliamentary Under-Secretary of State for Foreign Affairs	George Smythe	27 January 1846
Secretary of State for War and the Colonies	Edward Smith-Stanley, Baron Stanley	3 September 1841
Secretary of State for War and the Colonies	William Gladstone	23 December 1845
Under-Secretary of State for War and the Colonies	George William Hope	8 September 1841
Under-Secretary of State for War and the Colonies	George Lyttelton, 4th Baron Lyttelton	8 January 1846
First Lord of the Admiralty	Thomas Hamilton, 9th Earl of Haddington	6 September 1841
First Lord of the Admiralty	Edward Law, 1st Earl of Ellenborough	8 January 1846
First Secretary of the Admiralty	Sidney Herbert	10 September 1841
First Secretary of the Admiralty	Henry Lowry-Corry	4 February 1845
Civil Lord of the Admiralty	Henry Lowry-Corry	6 September 1841
Civil Lord of the Admiralty	Henry Fitzroy	10 February 1845
President of the Board of Control	Edward Law, 2nd Baron Ellenborough (Note: Created Earl of Ellenborough 22 October 1844.)	4 September 1841
President of the Board of Control	William Vesey-FitzGerald, 2nd Baron FitzGerald and Vesey	23 October 1841
President of the Board of Control	Frederick Robinson, 1st Earl of Ripon	17 May 1843
Joint Secretaries of the Board of Control	James Emerson Tennent	8 September 1841 – 5 August 1845
Joint Secretaries of the Board of Control	Bingham Baring	8 September 1841 – 17 February 1845
Joint Secretaries of the Board of Control	Robert Jocelyn, Viscount Jocelyn	17 February 1845 – 27 June 1846
Joint Secretaries of the Board of Control	Philip Stanhope, Viscount Mahon	5 August 1845 – 27 June 1846
Chancellor of the Duchy of Lancaster	Lord Granville Somerset (Note: Entered the Cabinet May 1844.)	3 September 1841
Paymaster General	Sir Edward Knatchbull, 9th Baronet	8 September 1841
Paymaster General	Bingham Baring	1 March 1845
Minister without Portfolio Leader of the House of Lords	Arthur Wellesley, 1st Duke of Wellington	3 September 1841
President of the Board of Trade	Frederick Robinson, 1st Earl of Ripon	3 September 1841
President of the Board of Trade	William Gladstone	15 May 1843
President of the Board of Trade	James Broun-Ramsay, 10th Earl of Dalhousie	5 February 1845
Vice-President of the Board of Trade	William Gladstone	3 September 1841
Vice-President of the Board of Trade	James Broun-Ramsay, 10th Earl of Dalhousie	10 June 1843
Vice-President of the Board of Trade	Sir George Clerk, 6th Baronet	5 February 1845
Secretary at War	Sir Henry Hardinge	4 September 1841
Secretary at War	Sir Thomas Fremantle	17 May 1844
Secretary at War	Sidney Herbert (Note: Entered the Cabinet May 1845.)	4 February 1845
First Commissioner of Woods and Forests	Henry Pelham-Clinton, Earl of Lincoln (Note: Entered the Cabinet February 1845.)	16 September 1841
First Commissioner of Woods and Forests	Charles Canning, 2nd Viscount Canning	2 March 1846
Chief Secretary for Ireland	Edward Eliot, Baron Eliot	6 February 1841
Chief Secretary for Ireland	Sir Thomas Fremantle	1 February 1845
Chief Secretary for Ireland	Henry Pelham-Clinton, Earl of Lincoln	14 February 1846
Lord Lieutenant of Ireland	Thomas Robinson, 2nd Earl de Grey	11 September 1841
Lord Lieutenant of Ireland	William à Court, 1st Baron Heytesbury	17 July 1844
Master of the Mint	William Gladstone	9 September 1841
Master of the Mint	Sir George Clerk, 6th Baronet	12 February 1845
Master-General of the Ordnance	Sir George Murray	9 September 1841
Surveyor-General of the Ordnance	Jonathan Peel	9 September 1841
Clerk of the Ordnance	Henry George Boldero	9 September 1841
Clerk of the Ordnance	Lord Arthur Lennox	7 August 1845
Storekeeper of the Ordnance	Francis Robert Bonham	9 September 1841
Storekeeper of the Ordnance	Sir Thomas Hastings	25 July 1845
Postmaster-General	William Lowther, Viscount Lowther (Note: Succeeded as 2nd Earl of Lonsdale 19 March 1844.)	9 September 1841
Postmaster-General	Edward Eliot, 3rd Earl of St Germans	30 December 1845
Attorney General	Sir Frederick Pollock, 1st Baronet	6 September 1841
Attorney General	Sir William Webb Follett	15 April 1844
Attorney General	Sir Frederic Thesiger	29 June 1845
Solicitor General	Sir William Webb Follett	6 September 1841
Solicitor General	Sir Frederic Thesiger	29 June 1844
Solicitor General	Sir Fitzroy Kelly	17 July 1845
Judge Advocate General	John Iltyd Nicholl	8 September 1841
Judge Advocate General	James Stuart-Wortley	24 January 1846
Lord Advocate	Sir William Rae, 3rd Baronet	4 September 1841
Lord Advocate	Duncan McNeill	26 October 1842
Solicitor General for Scotland	Duncan McNeill	9 September 1841
Solicitor General for Scotland	Adam Anderson	8 November 1842
Attorney General for Ireland	Francis Blackburne	23 September 1841
Attorney General for Ireland	Thomas Cusack-Smith	10 November 1842
Attorney General for Ireland	Richard Wilson Greene	2 February 1846
Solicitor General for Ireland	Edward Pennefather	23 September 1841
Solicitor General for Ireland	Joseph Devonsher Jackson	10 November 1841
Solicitor General for Ireland	Thomas Cusack-Smith	21 September 1842
Solicitor General for Ireland	Richard Wilson Greene	1 November 1842
Solicitor General for Ireland	Abraham Brewster	2 February 1846
Lord Steward of the Household	Charles Jenkinson, 3rd Earl of Liverpool	3 September 1841
Lord Chamberlain of the Household	George Sackville-West, 5th Earl De La Warr	8 September 1841
Vice-Chamberlain of the Household	Lord Ernest Bruce	7 September 1841
Master of the Horse	George Child-Villiers, 5th Earl of Jersey	4 September 1841
Treasurer of the Household	Frederick Hervey, Earl Jermyn	9 September 1841
Comptroller of the Household	George Dawson-Damer	9 September 1841
Captain of the Gentlemen-at-Arms	John Weld-Forester, 2nd Baron Forester	8 September 1841
Captain of the Yeomen of the Guard	John Kerr, 7th Marquess of Lothian	8 September 1841
Captain of the Yeomen of the Guard	George Percy, Earl of Beverley	15 January 1842
Master of the Buckhounds	James St Clair-Erskine, 3rd Earl of Rosslyn	10 September 1841
Chief Equerry and Clerk Marshal	Lord Charles Wellesley	10 September 1841
Mistress of the Robes	Charlotte Montagu-Douglas-Scott, Duchess of Buccleuch	10 September 1841
Lords in Waiting	John Butler, 2nd Marquess of Ormonde	10 September 1841 – 27 June 1846
Lords in Waiting	Henry Greville, 3rd Earl of Warwick	10 September 1841 – 27 June 1846
Lords in Waiting	George Douglas, 17th Earl of Morton	10 September 1841 – 27 June 1846
Lords in Waiting	Charles Yorke, 4th Earl of Hardwicke	10 September 1841 – 31 January 1846
Lords in Waiting	George Pitt-Rivers, 4th Baron Rivers	10 September 1841 – 27 June 1846
Lords in Waiting	Cornwallis Maude, 3rd Viscount Hawarden	15 September 1841 – 27 June 1846
Lords in Waiting	George Murray, Baron Glenlyon	31 January 1846 – 27 June 1846

Notes

Preceded by Second Melbourne ministry	Government of the United Kingdom; 1841–1846	Succeeded by First Russell ministry
