= Maziere Brady =

Irish judge

Sir Maziere Brady, 1st Baronet, PC (Ire) (20 July 1796 – 13 April 1871) was an Irish judge, notable for his exceptionally long, though not particularly distinguished tenure as Lord Chancellor of Ireland.

== Background ==
Brady was born at his parents' house on Parliament Street, Dublin, the second son of Francis Tempest Brady of Booterstown, a manufacturer of gold and silver thread, and his wife Charlotte Hodgson, daughter of William Hodgson of Castledawson, County Londonderry. He was baptised at St Werburgh's Church, Dublin. He was the brother of Sir Nicholas Brady, Lord Mayor of Dublin, and uncle of the eminent ecclesiastical historian William Maziere Brady.

The Bradys were an old and distinguished Munster family who were particularly associated with the town of Bandon, County Cork. Probably the most celebrated of his ancestors was the poet and psalmist Nicholas Brady (1659–1726), who collaborated with Nahum Tate, the Poet Laureate, on New Version of the Psalms of David.

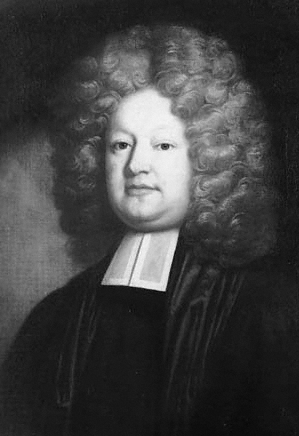
Nicholas Brady (1659-1726), the poet, ancestor of Maziere Brady

Other notable forebears include Hugh Brady, the first Protestant Bishop of Meath (d. 1584), his father-in-law Robert Weston who, like Maziere served as Lord Chancellor of Ireland, and the judge and author Luke Gernon (d. 1672), who is now best remembered for his work A Discourse of Ireland (1620), which gives a detailed and (from the English colonial point of view) not unsympathetic picture of the state of Ireland in 1620.

== Education ==
He was educated at Trinity College Dublin, and took his Bachelor of Arts degree in 1816. He entered the Middle Temple in 1816, was called to the Bar in 1819 and became King's Counsel in 1835.

== Legal and Judicial career ==
In politics he was a Liberal and supported Catholic Emancipation. He sat on a commission of inquiry into Irish municipal corporations in 1833. He was appointed Solicitor-General for Ireland in 1837 and Attorney-General for Ireland the following year. In 1840 he was appointed Lord Chief Baron of the Exchequer in Ireland. In 1846 he was appointed Lord Chancellor of Ireland and served in that office, with short intervals for the next 20 years. He retired in 1866 and was made a baronet, of Hazelbrook in the County of Dublin, in 1869. His appointment ended the practice which grew up after the Act of Union 1800 of appointing only English lawyers as Lord Chancellor of Ireland (with the exception of William Plunket, 1st Baron Plunket who served from 1830 to 1834 and from 1835 to 1841). He sat on the Government Commission on Trinity College Dublin in 1851, and was nominated as Vice-Chancellor of Queen's University Belfast in 1850. All through his life, he showed a keen interest in education.

== Reputation ==
According to Elrington Ball, Brady's Lord Chancellorship was notable for its length but for nothing else. Ball called him "a good Chief Baron spoiled to make a bad Chancellor". By general agreement he had been an excellent Chief Baron of the Exchequer, having a reputation for being fair-minded, courteous and approachable, but in Ball's view, the more onerous (and partly political) office of Lord Chancellor was beyond his capacity. Unlike some judges whose training had been in the common law, he never quite mastered the separate code of equity. Delaney takes a somewhat more favourable view of Brady as Lord Chancellor, arguing that while his judgements do not show any great depth of learning they do show an ability to identify the central issue of any case and to apply the correct legal principle to it.

An anonymous pamphlet from 1850, which was highly critical of the Irish judiciary in general, described Brady as being unable to keep order in his Court, and easily intimidated by counsel, especially by that formidable trio of future judges, Jonathan Christian, Francis Alexander FitzGerald, and Abraham Brewster. The author painted an unflattering picture of Brady as sitting "baffled and bewildered" in a Court where he was "a judge but not an authority". On the other hand, Jonathan Christian, who had often clashed with Brady in Court, later praised him as "no ordinary man" despite his shortcomings as a judge: Christian described him as "independent-minded, patriotic, natural and unaffected".

== Family and personal life ==
He was a founder member of the Stephen's Green Club and a member of the Royal Dublin Society and the Royal Irish Academy. As well as the arts he showed a keen interest in science, especially after his retirement. Like most judges of the time, he had both a townhouse in central Dublin and a place some way out of the city centre. His country house was Hazelbrook, Terenure, Dublin; he changed his townhouse several times, settling finally in Pembroke Street, where he died in 1871. He is buried in Mount Jerome Cemetery.

Brady married firstly Elizabeth Anne Buchanan, daughter of Bever Buchanan, apothecary of Dublin, and his wife Eleanor Hodgson, in 1823 and they had five children:

- Sir Francis William Brady, 2nd Baronet (1824–1909), who succeeded to the title, followed his father to the Bar and later became a County Court judge
- Maziere, who was also a barrister
- Eleanor (d. 1891) who married the Reverend Benjamin Puckle, Rector of Graffham, but had no issue
- Charlotte (1829–1913) who married the Reverend John Westropp Brady, Rector of Slane
- Elizabeth-Anne

== Remarriage and death ==
Elizabeth Buchanan Brady died in 1858. In 1860, Brady remarried Mary Hatchell, daughter of John Hatchell, Attorney General for Ireland and Elizabeth Waddy, who survived him. He died on 13 April 1871.

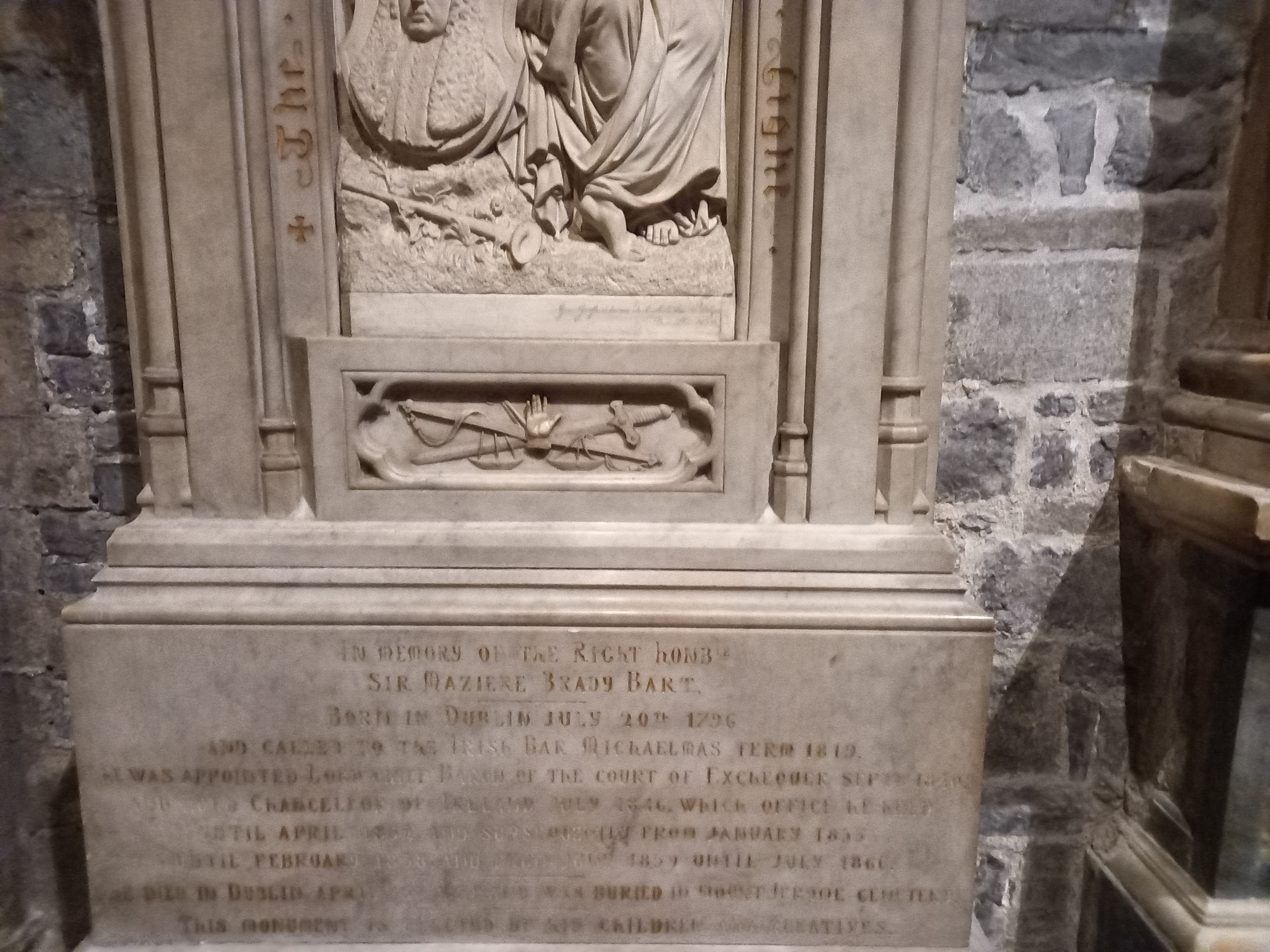
Tomb of Sir Maziere in St Patrick's Cathedral, Dublin.

== Arms ==
Coat of arms of Maziere Brady
Notes Confirmed 9 December 1868 by Sir John Bernard Burke, Ulster King of Arms. Crest A martlet Or charged on the breast with a trefoil slipped Vert. Escutcheon A saltire engrailed Or between four martlets Argent on a chief Gules three dishes each holding a boar's head couped of the second. Motto Vincit Pericula Virtus ("Virtue conquers dangers")

Legal offices
Preceded by Stephen Woulfe	Solicitor-General for Ireland; 1837–1839	Succeeded by David Richard Pigot
Preceded by Nicholas Ball	Attorney-General for Ireland; 1839–1840	Succeeded by David Richard Pigot
Preceded by Stephen Woulfe	Chief Baron of the Irish Exchequer; 1840–1846	Succeeded by David Richard Pigot
Preceded by Sir Edward Sugden	Lord Chancellor of Ireland; 1846–1852	Succeeded by Francis Blackburne
Preceded by Francis Blackburne	Lord Chancellor of Ireland; 1852–1858	Succeeded by Sir Joseph Napier
Preceded by Sir Joseph Napier	Lord Chancellor of Ireland; 1859–1866	Succeeded by Francis Blackburne
Baronetage of the United Kingdom
New creation	Baronet (of Hazelbrook); 1869–1871	Succeeded by Francis William Brady
