= En ventre sa mere =

The Law French phrase en ventre sa mere ("in its mother's womb") refers to a fetus in utero and is commonly used in Legal English.

An unborn fetus, which is thus still "en ventre sa mere", may be accepted to be a beneficiary for some purposes if it is subsequently born alive. Such a fetus is treated as born if it thereby takes a direct benefit.

The use of this concept in legal language can be traced to English cases in the 19th century. In Occleston v Fullalove (1873–74) L.R. 9 Ch. App. 147, a case heard in the Court of Appeal in Chancery, it was argued for the Appellant that although the child in question was "en ventre sa mère" at the date of the will subject to the litigation, there was neither principle nor authority against such a child having a reputation of paternity. The court allowed the after-born child to share with her sisters under the will.

The concept is used in common law jurisdictions and has been extended beyond the law of wills and succession so that claims in the law of torts are also recognised. In the Australian case Watt v. Rama [1972] VR 353 it was deemed that a fetus is a person entitled, once born, to compensation as a plaintiff for injury caused while en ventre sa mère.

Some U.S. cases have removed the requirement that the fetus actually be born. In Amadio v. Levin, 509 Pa. 199 (1985), the Supreme Court of Pennsylvania held that "it makes no difference in liability under the wrongful death and survival statutes whether the child dies of the injuries just prior to or just after birth." In Farley v. Sartin Trucking, 195 W.Va. 671, the Supreme Court of Appeals of West Virginia did away with a requirement that a tortiously killed fetus be viable outside the womb at the time the tort was committed. The deceased unborn child's personal representative may maintain an action pursuant to the state's wrongful death statute, the court held, cautioning that the cause of action does not extend against a woman who has a legal abortion.

In current spoken French, the phrase would now be rendered as "dans le ventre de sa mère".

== See also ==
- Nasciturus pro iam nato habetur, quotiens de commodis eius agitur
