= Court of Appeal in Chancery =

The Court of Appeal in Chancery was created in 1851 to hear appeals of decisions and decrees made in the Chancery Court. The appeals in the court were heard by the Lord Chancellor alone, or as a tripartite panel (supplemented by two Lords Justices of Appeal). Cases here could be further appealed to the House of Lords.

== Previous mechanism ==
Prior to the creation of the Court of Appeal in Chancery, the Lord Chancellor of the Chancery Court heard appeals as part of the Chancery Court caseload.

== Functions ==
The court was created in 1851 to hear appeals of decisions made by the Vice Chancellors and the Master of the Rolls in Chancery Court. The appeals in the court were heard by the Lord Chancellor alone as under the previous mechanism, or as a tripartite panel (supplemented by two Lords Justices of Appeal). Cases here could be further appealed to the House of Lords.

== Successor court ==
The Court of Appeal in Chancery became incorporated into and superseded by Court of Appeal of England and Wales, uniting the other common branches of the civil law and all of the criminal law, which was established later in 1875.

== Ireland ==
Analogous to the English court, the Court of Appeal in Chancery in Ireland was created in 1857 to hear appeals from the Irish Court of Chancery, and also from the Encumbered Estates' Court. It was subsumed into the Court of Appeal in Ireland created by the Supreme Court of Judicature Act (Ireland) 1877. Sitting with the Lord Chancellor of Ireland was a single Lord Justice of Appeal in Chancery in Ireland, Francis Blackburne until 1866, Abraham Brewster from 1866 until 1867 and Jonathan Christian from 1867.
