= Gerald Fitzgibbon (author) =

Irish lawyer and author

Gerald Fitzgibbon, QC (1 January 1793 – 1882), was an Irish lawyer and writer. He founded a notable Irish legal dynasty: his son and grandson, also named Gerald FitzGibbon, were both judges of great eminence.

== Background and education ==
Fitzgibbon, the fourth son of Gerald Fitzgibbon, an Irish tenant farmer, and his wife, a Miss Wyndham, was born at Glin, County Limerick. After receiving such education as was to be had at home and in the vicinity of his father's farm, he obtained employment as a clerk in a mercantile house in Dublin in 1814. His leisure hours he devoted to the study of the classics, and in 1817 entered Trinity College Dublin where he graduated B.A. in 1825, and proceeded M.A. in 1832, having in 1830 been called to the Irish Bar. During his college course and preparation for the bar, he maintained himself by teaching.

== Legal career ==
In his choice of the law as a profession he was guided by the advice of his tutor, Dr Stephen Sandes, afterwards Bishop of Cashel, and by the future High Court judge Charles Burton. His rise at the Irish Bar was rapid, his mercantile experience standing him in good stead, and in 1841 he became a Queen's Counsel.

In 1844 he unsuccessfully defended Sir John Grey, one of the traversers in the celebrated state prosecution of that year, by which Daniel O'Connell's influence with the Irish people was destroyed. In the course of the trial, Fitzgibbon used language concerning Sir Thomas Cusack-Smith, the Irish Attorney-General, which was construed by the latter (an eccentric and hot-tempered man) as an imputation of dishonourable motives, and was so keenly resented by him that he sent Fitzgibbon a challenge to a duel. Fitzgibbon returned the challenge, and on the Attorney-General declining to take it back, drew the attention of the court to the occurrence. Thereupon the Lord Chief Justice, Edward Pennefather, suspended the proceedings, in order to afford the parties time for reflection, observing that "the Attorney-General is the last man in his profession who ought to have allowed himself to be betrayed into such an expression of feeling as has been stated to have taken place". The Attorney-General thereupon expressed his willingness to withdraw the note, in the hope that Fitzgibbon would withdraw the words which had elicited it, and Fitzgibbon disclaiming any intention to impute conduct unworthy of a gentleman to the Attorney-General, the matter dropped, and the trial proceeded. Onlookers were startled by the fact that Fitzgibbon's wife and daughter were present in Court during the exchange.

== Author ==
Fitzgibbon continued his highly successful legal practice until 1860, when he accepted the post of Receiver-Master in Chancery. He published in 1868 a work entitled Ireland in 1868, the Battle Field for English Party Strife; its Grievances real and fictitious; Remedies abortive or mischievous, octavo. The book, which displays considerable literary ability, dealt with the educational, agrarian, religious, and other questions of the hour. The last and longest chapter, which was entitled 'The Former and Present Condition of the Irish People,' was published separately the same year. Its design is to show, by the evidence of history and tradition, that such measure of prosperity as Ireland has enjoyed has been due to the English connection. A second edition of the original work also appeared in the course of the year, with an additional chapter on the land question, in which stress is laid on the duties of landowners. This Fitzgibbon followed up with a pamphlet entitled 'The Land Difficulty of Ireland, with an Effort to Solve it,' 1869, octavo. The principal feature of his plan of reform was that fixity of tenure (one of the key political demands of the day) should be granted to the Irish tenant farmer, conditionally upon his executing improvements to his property to the satisfaction of a public official appointed for the purpose.

In 1871 he published Roman Catholic Priests and National Schools, a pamphlet in which the kind of religious instruction given by Roman Catholic priests, particularly with regard to the dogma of eternal punishment, is illustrated from authorised works. Fitzgibbon, though he does not seem to have been especially bigoted in religious matters, was profoundly suspicious of the Roman Catholic priesthood. A second edition with an appendix appeared in 1872. Having in 1871 been charged in the House of Commons with acting with inhumanity in the administration of certain landed property belonging to wards of the Court of Chancery (Ireland), he published in pamphlet form a vindication of his conduct, entitled Refutation of a Libel on Gerald Fitzgibbon, Esq., Master in Chancery in Ireland, 1871 8vo. Fitzgibbon also published A Banded Ministry and the Upas Tree, 1873, 8vo. He resigned his post in 1880, and died in September 1882.

== Reputation ==
As an advocate, he enjoyed a high reputation for patient and methodical industry, indefatigable energy, and great determination, combined with a very delicate sense of honour. Only a conscientious aversion to engaging in the struggles of party politics precluded him from aspiring to judicial office. His belief, which is entirely uncontroversial nowadays, that judges should be appointed solely on merit regardless of political affiliation, won little support in his lifetime. Eloquently, but in vain, he argued of the dangers of cutting off every road to the Bench other than the House of Commons, and warned that this would result in the appointment of men who had either lost their legal practice, or had never had any. As regards law reform, he was a staunch conservative, due to what Ferguson describes as "a respect for the law which could be called reverential".

== Family ==
Fitzgibbon married in 1835 Ellen, daughter of John Patterson, merchant, of Belfast, by whom he had one daughter and two sons: Gerald FitzGibbon, Lord Justice of the Irish Court of Appeal (died 1909), and Henry Fitzgibbon M.D. (died 1912), a distinguished doctor and vice-president of the Royal College of Surgeons in Ireland. His elder son was the father of a third Gerald Fitzgibbon, who followed his father to the Bench, becoming, on the establishment of the Irish Free State, one of the first judges of the Supreme Court of Ireland. Ellen died on 23 January 1885. Fitzgibbon's nephew, another Henry Fitzgibbon, was Recorder of Belfast. His family were members of the Church of Ireland.
