= Law of persons in South Africa =

Regulates the birth, private-law status and the death of natural persons

The law of persons in South Africa regulates the birth, private-law status and the death of a natural person. It determines the requirements and qualifications for legal subjectivity (aka legal personality) in South Africa, and the rights and responsibilities that attach to it.

== Objective and subjective law ==
As a discipline, the law of persons forms part of South Africa's positive law, or the norms and rules which order the conduct or misconduct of the citizens. Objective law is distinguished from law in the subjective sense, which is 'a network of legal relationships and messes among legal subjects', and which deals with rights, or 'the claim that a legal subject has on a legal object'. These relationships may be divided into two broad types:

1. The subject-subject relationship, between the bearer of the right and other legal subjects. This comprises both a right and an obligation: 'The legal subject's right exists against all other legal subjects, and they are obliged to respect it'.
2. The subject-object relationship, between the right-bearer and the legal object of his or her right.

Objective law, on the other hand, is often divided into public and private law. The former deals with the law as it applies to the exercise of state authority, while the latter applies to the varieties of legal relationships between persons, described above.

== Legal subjects and objects ==
The term person in the law of persons is roughly interchangeable with legal subject. A legal subject is an entity capable of holding rights, duties and capacities. A legal object is an entity which the law does not thus recognise, because it cannot legally interact; it is merely something in respect of which a legal subject may hold rights, duties and capacities.

There are widely agreed to be four kinds of subjective rights and four corresponding legal objects over which a legal subject exercises said rights:

- Patrimonial rights:
  - Real right: a legal subject exercises a real right (ius in rem) in respect of movable and immovable things, corporeal or incorporeal, which are of value and susceptible of control.
  - Personal right: a legal subject exercises a personal right (ius in personam) in respect of a performance, i.e. 'an act by which something is given (dare), done (facere) or not done (non facere)’, such as defrayment or delivery.
- Extra-patrimonial rights:
  - Immaterial property right: a legal subject exercises a right in respect of immaterial property, i.e. an idea, product or thought process of the human mind, such as intellectual property (copyright, patent or trademark), confidential information, trade secrets, biotechnological products, traditional knowledge or participatory claims.
  - Personality right: a legal subject exercises a personality right in respect of an aspect of one's own personality, like one's bodily integrity (corpus), reputation (fama), or human dignity (dignitas).

Similarly, there are two kinds of legal subject: natural and juristic.

=== Natural and juristic persons ===
Every human being, for the purposes of South African law, is recognised as a person, but not every legal person is a human being. The distinction is best understood with reference to the two classes of person recognised by the law: namely, natural and juristic. (Only these two have legal personality. Animals and deceased people are excluded.)

==== Natural persons ====
Although in 21st-century South Africa every human enjoys non-derogable status as a legal subject, this has not always and everywhere been the case. In Roman and Early Germanic law, for example, slaves had no legal rights or duties or capacities, and were treated merely as legal objects; as property, in other words. Slavery existed in the Cape, under both Dutch and British rule, until abolition in 1834. Under Roman law, the legal subjectivity of prisoners of war was also usually revoked, while children born with severe deformities—they were known as monstra—could be killed with the permission of a magistrate.

==== Juristic persons ====
A juristic person is a social entity, a community or an association of people which has an independent right of existence under the law. It can be 'the bearer of judicial capacities and subjective rights,’ and the accompanying legal entitlements and obligations, just like a natural person. Although it is independent of the natural persons who are its members, it acts through them. Three categories of juristic person are recognised.

- Associations established in separate legislation: These may be constituted only with governmental permission, usually where the government has an extensive interest in their operation. Eskom and the South African Broadcasting Corporation are regulated by specific statutes.
- Associations incorporated in terms of enabling legislation: These are also controlled by government in the interests of society, but do not require governmental permission, only registration in terms of a general enabling statute, for their creation. Such is the case, generally speaking, for corporations and banks.
- Associations which comply with the common-law requirements for the establishment of a juristic person: These association were known as universitates at common law, which requires merely that the association continue to exist irrespective of changes in membership; that it carry rights, duties and capacities distinct from those of its members; and that its object not be the acquisition of gain, in which case it must register as a company.

==== Beginning of legal subjectivity ====
Legal subjectivity begins at birth, prior to which the foetus is generally regarded not as a legal person but merely as a part of the mother. It therefore (in general) has no rights or duties or capacities. Determinations as to whether a legitimate or lawful birth has occurred, and hence whether or not the infans has achieved legal subjectivity, can be especially significant for the purposes of the law of succession.

The term birth is regulated by two common law requirements.

- The delivery must be fully completed; there must be total separation between the body of the mother and that of the infans
- The child must be or have been alive, and lived independently, after separation. Even if for a short period of time. A stillborn foetus, or one that dies during delivery, is hence not accorded legal subjectivity.

A third requirement, that the child be viable, has occasionally been mooted, whereby the foetus must have reached the point in gestation at which it could live (with or without aid) independent of its mother's bloodstream. There are as yet no grounds for this requirement under South African law.

There is also, however, no definitive test for life after birth in South African law. The Criminal Procedure Act includes the following provision:

At criminal proceedings at which an accused is charged with the killing of a newly-born child, such child shall be deemed to have been born alive if the child is proved to have breathed, whether or not the child had an independent circulation, and it shall not be necessary to prove that such child was, at the time of its death, entirely separated from the body of its mother.

For the determination of whether or not a child took breath after birth, questions such as whether or not it cried or registered heart activity, and especially the hydrostatic test, are considered. The Births and Deaths Registration Act defines birth as the nativity of a live child (even where such life is fleeting), and requires that all such be registered. A child is stillborn if 'it has had at least 26 weeks of intrauterine existence but showed no sign of life after complete birth.' These considerations were of especial significance for the important case of S v Mshumpa, where it was determined that the definition of murder did not extend to the intentional killing of a foetus. The victim of a killing had to have been born, and born alive, to qualify as a person, and for his or her killing thus to qualify as murder.

When, prior to the operation of section 40 of Children's Act, a child was born by artificial fertilisation of a lesbian in a life partnership, it was given either partner's surname or else a double-barrel surname. This was the result of the case of J v Director-General, which found unconstitutional section 5 of the Children's Status Act, which held that a child was only to be regarded under the law as 'legitimate' when its birth mother was married. This meant in addition that only the birth mother, and not the life partner, could be registered as a parent. The whole of the Children's Status Act was subsequently repealed by the Children's Act; although section 40 of the latter re-enacted the unamended section 5 of the former, the Civil Union Act had by that stage put civil unions on an equal footing with marriages, thus resolving the problem.

===== Protection of the interests of the unborn child =====
Although in general, being without legal subjectivity, the foetus has no rights or duties or capacities, there are certain measures in South African law which provide for its protection if it is subsequently born. Aside from some statutory security and a number of common delictual principles, there is, most notably, the nasciturus fiction, which in Roman law read as follows: Nasciturus pro iam nato habetur, quotiens de commodis eius agitur. It provides that, if it be to the advantage of the nasciturus or unborn child, it is deemed for legal purposes already to have been born, and its interests thus are kept open. The fiction was received from Roman into Roman-Dutch law, where it was a feature especially of the law of succession, and thence into South African law, where it is still operable today.

There are three requirements in South African common law for the operation of the nasciturus fiction:

1. The fiction must operate to the advantage of the nasciturus. The fiction may not be applied if it would be to the disadvantage of the nasciturus, or where only a third party stands to benefit.
2. The benefit to the nasciturus must accrue after its conception.
3. The nasciturus must ultimately be born alive, in the legal-technical sense outlined above.

In Christian League of Southern Africa v Rall, the court made clear how the fiction was to be applied in practice:

die toepassing van die nasciturus-fiksie nie die ongeborene met enige regspersoonlikeheid beklee nie. Dit verseker slegs dat voordele wat die ongebore vrug na geboorte mag toeval in suspenso gehou word tot sy geboorte'

In English, roughly speaking: No legal personality is actually granted to the foetus by deployment of the nasciturus fiction; it remains without legal subjectivity, and does not have a right (to life, for instance) that can be enforced on its behalf. The benefits accruing to it through the fiction are held 'in suspense' until it is born, at which point the fiction is no longer, so to speak, fictional.

====== Succession ======
The nasciturus fiction derives its importance in South African law primarily from its operation in the law of succession. This subjects has to do with the inheritance of the heirs/beneficiaries that the deceased left behind.

====== Intestate succession ======
Intestate succession covers those rules which apply if a deceased person failed to leave behind a legally valid will to determine who would inherit his assets, in which case prospective heirs may only inherit if alive at the time of delatio, when the estate falls open. Were this rule left to stand on its own, and strictly applied, a conceived but unborn child would be unqualified for intestate inheritance. The nasciturus fiction, however, typically operates in just such cases. If, at the time of delatio, the nasciturus has already been conceived, the fiction is applied to keep its interests in abeyance, and the division of the estate is postponed until such time as the nasciturus is born in the legal-technical sense. If the child is eventually born alive, he will share in the estate as if he had already been born at the time of the testator's death. Delatio must, however, occur after the moment of conception.

====== Testate succession ======
Testate succession covers those rules which apply if the deceased left behind a legally valid will to determine who would inherit his assets. The nasciturus fiction was expressly included for the purposes of testate succession, and thus became part of statutory law, in the Wills Act:

any benefit allocated to the children of a person, or to the members of a class of persons mentioned in the will shall vest in the children of that person or those members of the class of persons who are alive at the time of the devolution of the benefit, or who have already been conceived at that time and who are later born alive.

In other words, all persons are eligible for inheritance in terms of a will who are alive at the time of the devolution of its benefits, or who had been conceived before that time and were later born alive. The testator in this scenario dies prior to the birth of the heir, but after the heir's conception. The Act introduced a rebuttable presumption that the testator wished to benefit not only those children or members of a class of persons who are alive at the time of his death, but also those who have already been conceived and will later be born alive. In Ex Parte Boedel Steenkamp, an important case decided prior to the addition of section 2D(1)(c) to the Wills Act, and often seen as a precursor to the Law of Succession Amendment Act, the court made clear its unwillingness to act to the prejudice of the nasciturus fiction. If the testator desired to preclude its use in the division of his estate, he had to express this intention very clearly.

====== Wrongful life actions ======
The role of the nasciturus fiction in wrongful life actions may best be understood with reference to the cases of Stewart v Botha and Friedman v Glicksman.

====== Other methods of preserving the interests of the unborn child ======
Among the other common-law methods available in South Africa for the preservation of the interests of unborn children is their nomination in wills and trust deeds.

Statutory measures for the protection of unborn children may be found in the following legislation:

- Immovable Property (Removal or Modification of Restrictions) Act.
- General Law Amendment Act.
- Administration of Estates Act.

===== Abortion =====
Abortion, legal in South Africa, is regulated by the Choice on Termination of Pregnancy Act.

====== Choice on Termination of Pregnancy Act ======
Established in 1996 to repeal the Abortion and Sterilisation Act (to the extent that the latter was applicable to abortion), the Choice on Termination of Pregnancy Act stressed that 'termination of pregnancy is not a form of contraception or population control,’ and divided pregnancy into three trimesters.

1. During the first twelve weeks of gestation, an abortion may be provided 'on demand'—that is, at the request of the pregnant woman—and may be carried out by a medical practitioner, a registered midwife or a registered nurse with the needful training.
2. From the thirteenth week to the twentieth, a pregnancy may be terminated only under four conditions. After consultation with the pregnant woman, a medical practitioner must be of the view that
  1. continuation of the pregnancy would risk injury to the woman's mental or physical health; or
  2. the risk is substantial that the child would suffer a severe physical or mental abnormality; or
  3. the pregnancy resulted from rape or incest; or
  4. continuation of the pregnancy would significantly affect the social or economic circumstances of the woman.
3. Abortions after the twentieth week of gestation are restricted to three instances. A medical practitioner, after consulting another medical practitioner or a registered midwife or nurse, must be of the view that continued pregnancy
  1. would endanger the woman's life; or
  2. would result in severe malformation of the foetus; or
  3. would pose a risk of injury to the foetus.

====== Constitutional issues ======
The courts consistently ruled and held, even before the enactment of the Bill of Rights, that a foetus is not a legal subject, and does not therefore have a right to life which can be enforced on its behalf. After the enactment of the Bill of Rights and the Choice on Termination of Pregnancy Act, the entirety of the latter was challenged, with reference to the Bill of Rights, in Christian Lawyers Association of South Africa v Minister of Health. The plaintiffs cited the constitutional guarantee of the right to life, and argued that, as life begins at conception, any and all abortion was unconstitutional. The defendants raised an exception to the plaintiffs' particulars of claim, and this exception the court upheld: that it did not disclose a cause of action, because the Constitution does not grant legal subjectivity to, and therefore does not confer any rights on, a foetus.

The constitutional standing of abortion in South Africa is even clearer in the section of the Bill of Rights immediately following the right to life: 'Everyone has the right to bodily and psychological integrity, which includes the right to make decisions concerning reproduction.'

==== End of legal subjectivity ====
Legal subjectivity is terminated at death, such that the deceased, like the unborn and the unconceived, have no legal rights or duties, and—obviously—no capacities. A dead body is thus only a legal object or 'thing', but there are, in the interests of public health and out of respect for the dead and the feelings and sensibilities of relatives, certain protections in South African law. The handling and disposal of human detritus is regulated, for example, and necrophilia is a crime; likewise the violation of a grave.

===== Legal requirements for death =====
There is as yet no general legal definition of death in South African law. Where previously the test for death was met by the irreversible absence of natural heart and lung activity, now there is no precise moment at which death may be said to have occurred; it is a process that may extend over time. In S v Williams, the court went with the 'traditional view of the community' in declaring the deceased to have been legally dead when she stopped breathing and her heart stopped beating. Under the National Health Act, however, ‘"death" means brain death’. The Births and Deaths Registration Act provides no helpful definition.

===== Registration of death =====
The registration of deaths in South Africa is governed by the Births and Deaths Registration Act. All deaths must be reported, by anyone present at or aware of them, or directing their funerals, to the Director-General of Home Affairs, or to a person duly authorised by the Director-General, irrespective of whether the death was due to natural or unnatural causes. The Director-General will then register the death and issue an official death certificate. Where unnatural causes are suspected, the death must additionally be reported, either by the Director-General or by the relevant medical practitioner, to the police.

===== Presumption of death =====
In South Africa, when a person disappears and there is insufficient evidence to establish whether or not he is still alive, there is no body for which a doctor can issue a death certificate and no witness who can testify to the person's death. In such circumstances, a presumption of death may be sought under either the common law or statutory provisions. Anyone with an interest in the death of the missing person may apply to the High Court having jurisdiction over the area in which the person lived at the time of the disappearance, and must establish, on a balance of probabilities, that the person is dead. A court will not presume death lightly and must be satisfied that the missing person is more likely to be dead than alive. In making this determination, the court may consider the circumstances of the disappearance and the person's age.

====== Common law ======
Because Roman-Dutch law is so unclear on the period of absence required for a presumption of death, South Africa initially followed the English rule in terms of which the missing person must have been absent for an uninterrupted period of seven years. This was later replaced, in Re Beaglehole, with the rule that no fixed period of absence is required. Each case is judged on its own merits, and a variety of factors is now considered. Length of absence is one, and often it is decisive, but the court will also take into account the circumstances in which the person disappeared, his age and his health. Ex parte Pieters cited the general rule, established in In re Cuthbert, that prolonged absence is not enough in itself persuade the court to make a presumption of death, especially where there is absolutely no evidence otherwise to suggest it. There are, of course, exceptions to the rule, but for the most part they entail some substitute for the presumption. In Ex parte Pieters, the court issued a rule nisi, declining to presume Pieters death, and authorised the Master to distribute his estate (only around R6,000, which was a factor in the court's considerations) among his children.

====== Statutory procedure ======
In addition to the common law on presumption of death, there is the Inquests Act, which provides for circumstances in which there is a suspicion of unnatural causes. If the Magistrate considers someone's death to have been due to unnatural causes, he must hold an inquest. A record of the findings, if they establish the deceased's identity and date of death, must be submitted to the relevant High Court for review. If the High Court confirms the findings, the effect is the same as for a presumption-of-death order.

====== Effect ======
It is worth stressing that the effect of the court's order is not to declare that a person is dead but only to make a rebuttable presumption to that effect. Should it transpire that the person is actually alive, a simple application to the relevant court (which may be brought by any interested party, or by the living person himself) will usually suffice to have its order set aside.

The first consequence of an order of presumption of death is that the estate of the missing person is divided, as if he were dead, among his heirs. It is not always required for this, however, that a court be willing to grant a presumption of death; the court also has the option of appointing a curator bonis to administer the missing person's affairs without granting a presumption-of-death order, the precedent for which was established in In re Kannemeyer, where the heirs were required to give security for the inherited estate in the event that the missing person reappeared.

A second consequence is that the missing person's life policies are paid out to the beneficiaries, on the condition that cautio de restituendo be provided. A third consequence is on the missing person's marriage, which is not automatically dissolved by a presumption-of-death order. The remarriage of the surviving spouse is regulated by the Dissolution of Marriages on Presumption of Death Act: Should she wish to remarry or enter a new civil union, she must bring an application for a court order dissolving the marriage or civil union of the missing person. The dissolution will take effect from a date determined by the court, and the application may be brought alongside an application for presumption of death, or any time after the presumption is made. The court will not grant the application mero motu—but only on application by the spouse or civil partner of the missing person. The necessary implication of a successful application for the dissolution of a marriage or civil union is that it will remain dissolved even if the missing person reappears.

== See also ==
- Abortion in South Africa

== Bibliography ==
=== Books ===
- B.Q.R. Boberg. The law of persons and the family. Cape Town: Juta, 1977.
- T. Boezaart. Law of persons, 5th edn. Claremont: Juta, 2010.
- C.J. Davel & R.A. Jordaan. Law of Persons, 4th edn. Cape Town: Juta, 2005.
- Herman R. Hahlo & Ellison Kahn. The South African Legal System and its Background. Cape Town: Juta, 1968.
- Jacqueline Heaton & D.S.P. Cronjé. The South African Law of Persons, 3rd edn. Durban: Butterworths, 2008.
  - current: Jacqueline Heaton. The South African Law of Persons, 5th edn. Durban: LexisNexis, 2017.
- Hanneretha Kruger & Ann Skelton, eds. The Law of Persons in South Africa. Cape Town: Oxford University Press Southern Africa, 2010.
- C.R. Snyman. Criminal Law, 5th edn. Durban: Butterworths, 2008.
- J.D. van der Vyver & David Johannes Joubert. Persone- en familiereg, 3rd edn. Cape Town: Juta, 1991.
- Frederik Jacobus van Zyl & J.D. van der Vyver. Inleiding tot die regswetenskap, 2nd edn. Durban: Butterworths, 1982.

=== Cases ===
- Chisolm v East Rand Proprietary Mines Ltd 1909 TH 297.
- Christian Lawyers Association of South Africa v Minister of Health 1998 (11) BCLR 1434 (T).
- Christian League of Southern Africa v Rall 1981 (2) SA 821 (O).
- Ex parte Boedel Steenkamp 1962 (3) SA 954 (O).
- Ex parte Engelbrecht 1956 (1) SA 408 (E).
- Ex parte Maclean 1968 (2) SA 644 (C).
- Ex Parte Pieters 1993 (3) SA 379 (D).
- Friedman v Glicksman 1996 (1) SA 1134 (W).
- In re Booysen 1880 Foord 187.
- In re Cuthbert 1932 NLR 615.
- In re Kannemeyer: Ex parte Kannemeyer (1899) 16 SC 407.
- J v Director-General, Department of Home Affairs 2003 (5) BCLR 463 (CC).
- Pinchin and Another v Santam Insurance Co Ltd 1963 (2) SA 254 (W).
- Re Beaglehole 1908 TS 49.
- Road Accident Fund v Mtati 2005 (6) SA 215 (SCA).
- S v Mashumpa and Another 2008 (1) SACR 126 (E).
- S v Williams 1986 (4) SA 1188.
- Shields v Shields 1946 CPD 242.
- Stewart and Another v Botha and Another 2008 (6) SA 310 (SCA).
- Tjollo Ateljees (Eins) Bpk v Small 1949 (1) SA 856 (A).

=== Statutes ===
- Abortion and Sterilization Act 2 of 1975.
- Administration of Estates Act 66 of 1965.
- Banks Act 94 of 1990.
- Births and Deaths Registration Act 51 of 1992.
- Broadcasting Act 4 of 1999.
- Children's Act 38 of 2005.
- Children's Status Act 82 of 1987.
- Choice on Termination of Pregnancy Act 92 of 1996.
- Close Corporations Act 69 of 1984.
- Companies Act 61 of 1973.
- Criminal Law (Sexual Offences and Related Matters) Amendment Act 32 of 2007.
- Criminal Procedure Act 51 of 1977.
- Dissolution of Marriages on Presumption of Death Act 23 of 1979.
- Electricity Act 41 of 1987.
- General Law Amendment Act 62 of 1955.
- Immovable Property (Removal or Modification of Restrictions) Act 94 of 1965.
- Inquests Act 58 of 1959.
- Law of Succession Amendment Act 43 of 1992.
- Mutual Banks Act 124 of 1993.
- National Health Act 61 of 2003.
- Wills Act 7 of 1953.
