= S v Mshumpa =

South African legal case

S v Mshumpa and Another was a South African case with special significance for the law of persons and succession.

== Background ==
Melissa Shelver, a young pregnant woman, was shot in the abdomen with the (successful) intention of killing her unborn child. The shooter and first accused, Ludwe Mshumpa, had entered into a conspiracy with the baby's father and second accused, David Best, who had paid him to commit the crime. In order to make the attack appear genuine, and thus to clear himself of suspicion, Best had arranged for Mshumpa to shoot him as well. Both Best and Shelver barely survived.

== Case ==
The court was first tasked with determining whether or not Mshumpa should be convicted of the attempted murder of the mother. It found that the risk of death to the mother was eminently foreseeable in the act of shooting (it was established that she would have died had she not received medical treatment), and that dolus eventualis could not be excluded merely because the shooter's intention was only to kill the foetus. As a result, Mshumpa was found guilty of the attempted murder of Shelver.

The court's next consideration was whether to convict Mshumpa of the attempted murder of Best. As neither suicide nor attempted suicide is a crime in South Africa, Best could not be found guilty as co-perpetrator of his own attempted murder. Mshumpa, however, was convicted, along the same lines as his conviction for the attempted murder of Shelver; he must have foreseen that there was a risk of death if he shot Best. The fact that Best had consented to be shot did not render such shooting lawful.

The court also had to determine whether Mshumpa's intentional killing of Shelver's unborn child amounted to the crime of murder. Because this would entail extending the definition of "murder," and because such extension would offend the constitutional principle of legality, the court declined to do, reasoning that the legislature was better suited to broaden "murder" to include the killing of an unborn child.
