= Brady baronets =

Extinct baronetcy in the Baronetage of the United Kingdom

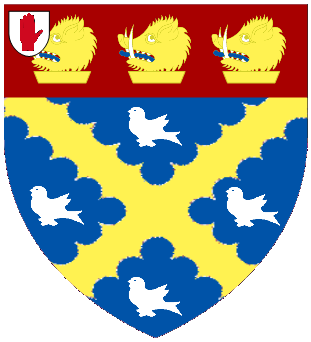
- Escutcheon of the Brady baronets of Hazelbrook
- Creation date: 1869
- Status: extinct
- Extinction date: 1927
- Motto: Vincit pericula virtus (Virtue conquers dangers)
- Arms: A saltire engrailed Or between four martlets argent on a chief gules three dishes each holding a boar's head couped of the second. Confirmed 9 December 1868 by Sir John Bernard Burke, Ulster King of Arms.
- Crest: A martlet or charged on the breast with a trefoil slipped vert

The Brady Baronetcy, of Hazelbrook in the County of Dublin, was a title in the Baronetage of the United Kingdom.

== History ==
It was created on 19 January 1869 for Maziere Brady, three times Lord Chancellor of Ireland. The title became extinct on the death of the fourth Baronet in 1927,

Sir Nicholas Brady, brother of the first Baronet, was Lord Mayor of Dublin from 1839 to 1840. His son, William Maziere Brady, was a priest, ecclesiastical historian and journalist. The family was descended from the Right Reverend Hugh Brady, Bishop of Meath from 1563 to 1584.

== Brady baronets, of Hazelbrook (1869) ==
- Sir Maziere Brady, 1st Baronet (1796–1871)
- Sir Francis William Brady, 2nd Baronet (1824–1909)
- Sir Robert Maziere Brady, 3rd Baronet (1854–1909)
- Sir William Longfield Brady, 4th Baronet (1864–1927)
