= Law Adviser to the Lord Lieutenant of Ireland =

The Law Adviser to the Lord Lieutenant of Ireland was a Law Officer of the English Crown in nineteenth-century Ireland. The office lapsed in the 1880s, due apparently to concerns that it was becoming too political, but was briefly revived in the early twentieth century. It was abolished on the establishment of the Irish Free State in 1922.

The office was created in 1831 to ease the heavy workload of the existing Irish Law Officers, the Attorney General for Ireland and the Solicitor General for Ireland.

== Role of the Law Adviser ==
No specific duties were assigned to the Law Adviser when the office was created: he acted simply as a general assistant to the senior Law Officers. Later he was given the tasks of drafting Parliamentary bills relating to Ireland, and of advising lay magistrates on any legal problems which they referred to him. Cases involving State security also fell under his remit: Denis Caulfield Heron, the Law Adviser in 1867, was heavily occupied in prosecuting the trials which followed the Fenian Rising.

At first, the Law Adviser was usually chosen from among the Serjeants-at-law, but in time the position was opened up to rising junior barristers, many of whom hoped in due course to be appointed to the Bench. Later it was decided that the offices of Serjeant and Law Adviser should be separate. There may have been a feeling that some of the work of the Law Adviser was beneath the dignity of the holder of the ancient and prestigious office of Serjeant. However, the Law Adviser might still hope to be appointed a Serjeant at a later date, as James Robinson was. Some holders of the office had a very brief tenure: Jonathan Christian resigned after a few months because the work was interfering with his private practice, and Robinson after a similarly brief time resigned to become Chairman of Quarter Sessions. The appointment could be "non-political": Richard Wilson Greene, the first Law Adviser, was generally seen as an opponent of the Government which appointed him.

The Attorney General normally had the final word in the appointment of the Law Adviser: certainly, this was so in 1841 when Francis Blackburne insisted on the appointment of Abraham Brewster as Adviser, despite strong opposition from Daniel O'Connell, who disliked Brewster. Blackburne said that he would not tolerate a refusal to ratify the appointment, an interesting glimpse of the influence he wielded in the Dublin administration at the time.

The Law Adviser's function of advising magistrates on points of law was open to criticism as an interference by the Crown with the independence of the judiciary. In particular John Naish, the last nineteenth-century Law Adviser, was attacked by his political opponents for assisting magistrates in suppressing the Irish National Land League. He was criticised in particular for advising that they should use a fourteenth century statute, the Justices of the Peace Act 1361 (34 Edw. 3. c. 1) to imprison those who could not find surety for their good behaviour. Since the statute had clearly been intended only to deal with cases of riot, this was a misreading of the law.

== End of the Office of Law Adviser ==
Perhaps because of the controversy over Naish's advice to magistrates on dealing with the Land League, the office was left vacant after his promotion to the office of Solicitor General for Ireland in December 1883. Earlier the same year, a Government spokesman had revealed in the House of Commons that the Government itself had doubts about the Law Adviser's role in advising magistrates, and it is likely that this led to a comprehensive review of the role of, and need for the Law Adviser, which led in turn to his position being left vacant. In 1886 the Government confirmed that "there were no plans" to appoint another Law Adviser.

The office was briefly revived in 1919, but lapsed a year later, and was finally abolished by the Irish Free State in 1924.

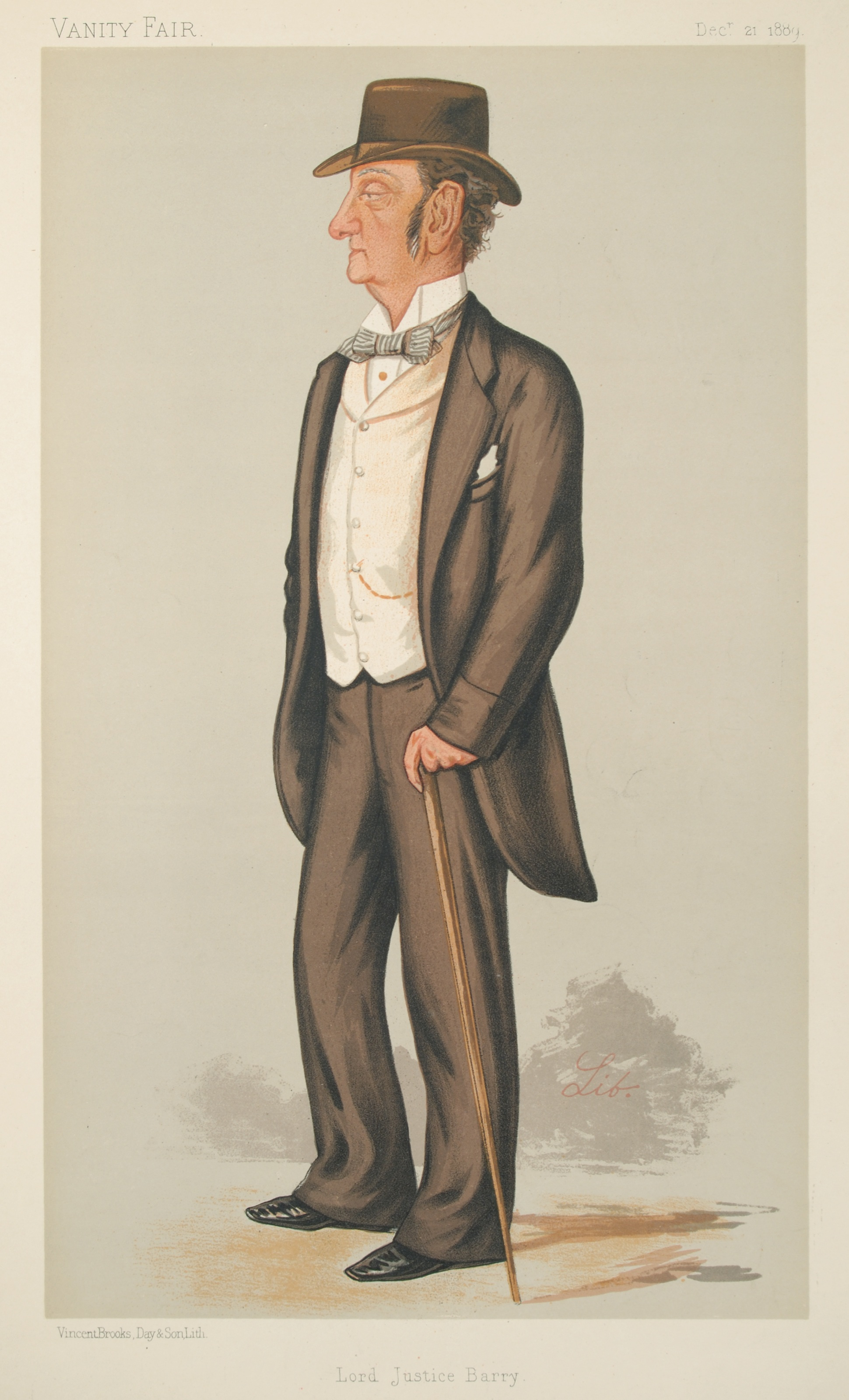
Sketch of Charles Robert Barry, Law Adviser 1865-1866

== List of Law Advisers 1831-1883,1919-1920 ==
incomplete

- 1831 Richard Wilson Greene
- 1841 Abraham Brewster
- 1850 Jonathan Christian
- 1852 Edmund Hayes
- 1858 James Anthony Lawson
- 1859 James Robinson
- 1859 Andrew Vance
- 1861 Sir Edward Sullivan, 1st Baronet
- 1865 Charles Robert Barry
- 1866 Denis Caulfield Heron
- 1868 David Plunket, 1st Baron Rathmore
- 1868 Hugh Law
- 1874 George Augustus Chichester May
- 1875 Sir Frederick Falkiner
- 1876 Gerald FitzGibbon
- 1879 John Monroe
- 1880 John Naish

The office was vacant 1883-1919

- 1919 William Wylie

The office lapsed in 1920 and was abolished in 1924
