= Nasciturus pro iam nato habetur, quotiens de commodis eius agitur =

Latin legal maxim

Nasciturus pro iam nato habetur, quotiens de commodis eius agitur is a Latin legal maxim that refers to a law that grants or protects the right of a fetus to inherit property. The maxim translates, "The unborn is deemed to have been born to the extent that his own benefits are concerned". "Nasciturus" literally translates to "one who is to be born" and refers to a conceived foetus: a living child who has not yet been born. Pursuant to the legal principle, the fetus is presumed to have been born for the purposes of inheritance. The principle was reified in Roman law and continues to be implemented today in most European nations, in the Americas (where the fetus is sometimes legally considered to be a person), and in South Africa.

When considered a legal exception, it is thought to apply exclusively for the purposes of inheritance and that conditions must be satisfied for it to be valid, primarily that the fetus has to be born.

== Historical instances ==
Notable cases of the application of the maxim include the following monarchs:

John I, the short-lived, posthumous son of King Louis X, who inherited the throne of France in utero and, upon birth, he reigned for the five days of his post-natal life in 1316.

In 1439, king Albert II of Germany died and next year his son Ladislaus the Posthumous succeeded him in Bohemia and Austria. In 1444, he was proclaimed King in Hungary and Croatia after the interim King Vladislaus I Jagiellon died at the Battle of Varna. Germany went to Albert's second cousin, who became Frederick III, Holy Roman Emperor, due to its elective monarchy.

In 1650 and 1711, William II and John William Friso, Princes of Orange died before their sons and heirs William III and William IV were born.

When Victoria inherited the British throne in 1837, her proclamation of accession specified that she inherited it from her uncle "saving the rights of any issue of his late Majesty King William IV, which may be born of his late Majesty's consort, Queen Adelaide", because any such unborn progeny would have had a prior claim to the throne under primogeniture. They would have ipso facto displaced her as British monarch at birth. (William IV had then recently died, hence there was still a very remote chance of Adelaide's being pregnant with his offspring at the time of Victoria's accession, but Adelaide did not in fact go on to carry any further pregnancies to term, so the anticipated possibility this caveat accounted for did not eventuate.)

In 1885, king Alfonso XII of Spain died and was provisionally succeeded by his daughter María de las Mercedes, Princess of Asturias until his wife's pregnancy turned out to be a boy, who became Alfonso XIII of Spain upon birth.

== See also ==
- En ventre sa mere
- Law of persons in South Africa
- Fetal rights
