= Andrew Vance =

Irish barrister

Andrew Vance (1815–1862) was an Irish barrister and government official.

He was born in Dublin, third son of Andrew Vance of Rutland Square and Mary Falls, daughter of James Falls of Aughnacloy, County Tyrone. The Vance family is thought to have emigrated from Scotland to Ulster. A brother, John Vance (1808–1875), was MP for Dublin City, who coined the phrase "Home Rule will be Rome Rule" (i.e. Irish Home Rule equals the rule of the Catholic Church).

Andrew was called to the bar, built up a flourishing practice, and in 1859 served as Law Adviser to the Lord Lieutenant of Ireland, a deputy to the Attorney General of Ireland and the Solicitor General for Ireland. He had two daughters, and their mother passed before Vance’s death, after he suffered from serious ill health in middle age, dying after a long illness at Nice in November 1862.

Her had was a legal writer, publishing articles in legal periodicals. Shortly before his death, he published "The Green Book", a casebook and commentary on the leading Irish statutes.

== Sources ==
- Irish Law Times November 1862
- Irish Jurist Vol. 8 (1859)
- O'Hart, John Irish Pedigrees 5th Edition Dublin 1892
