= Rathfarnham Castle =

Fortified house in Ireland

- Caisleán Rath Fearnáin
- Near Dublin in Ireland
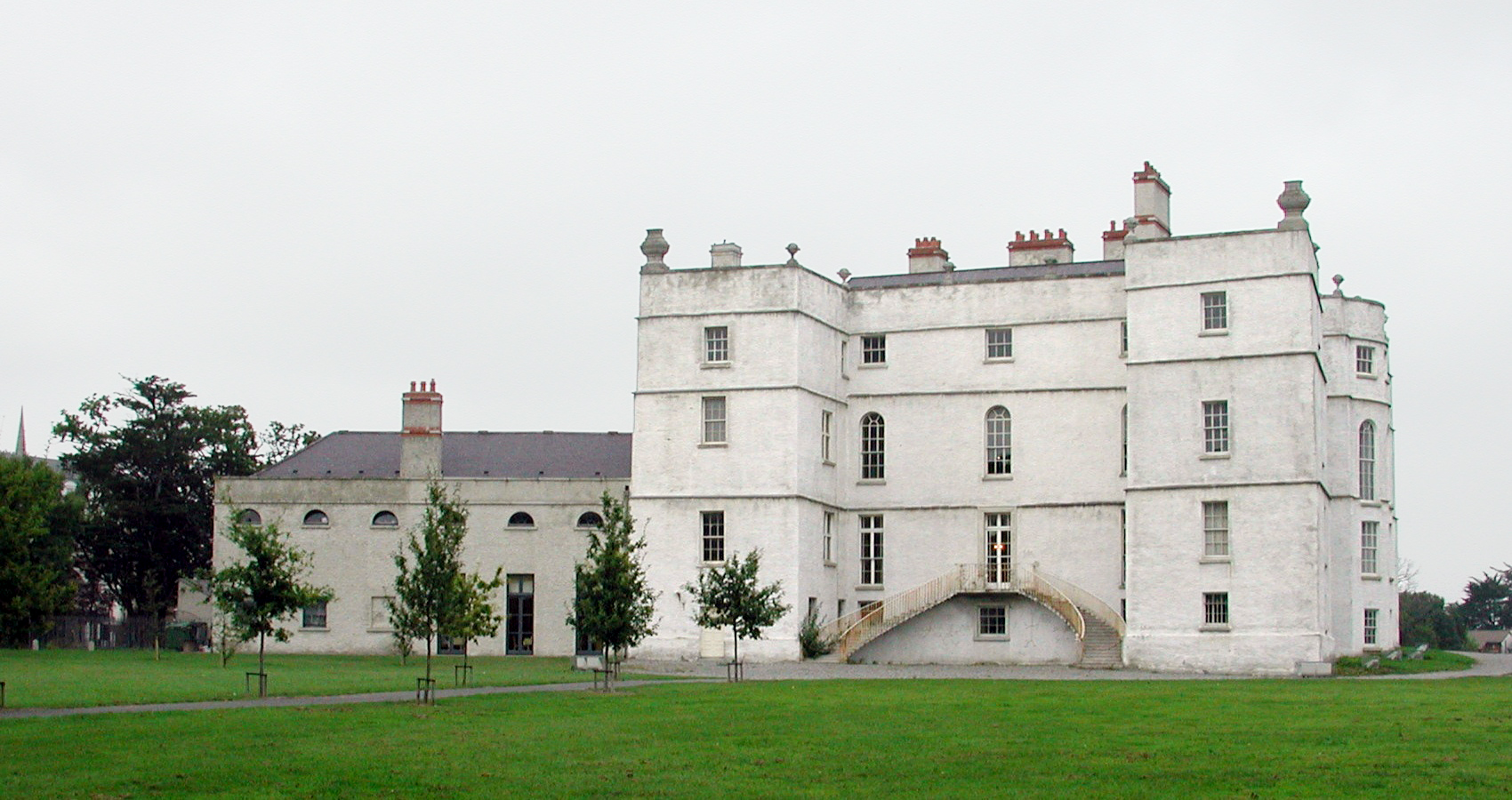

Site information
- Owner: Ireland (managed by the Office of Public Works)
- Open to the public: Yes
- Website: heritageireland.ie/visit/places-to-visit/rathfarnham-castle/

Location
- Location within Dublin
- Coordinates: 53.2981°N 6.2836°W

Site history
- Built: c. 1583
- Built by: Adam Loftus
- Materials: Sandstone

National monument of Ireland
- Official name: Rathfarnham Castle
- Reference no.: 628

Rathfarnham Castle (Irish: Caisleán Rath Fearnáin) is a 16th-century fortified house in Rathfarnham, Dublin, Ireland. Originally a semi-fortified and battlemented structure, it underwent extensive alterations in the 18th century. It is in the care of the state, has been restored and is open to the public.

== History ==
=== Early stages ===
An earlier Irish castle on the site was occupied by the Harold family, who held it as tenants of the le Bret family. It was replaced by the present building, built on lands confiscated from the Eustace family of Baltinglass, to whom it had passed, because of their involvement in the Second Desmond Rebellion. The Geraldines defended the Pale from the Irish clans in the nearby Wicklow Mountains. Rathfarnham was described as a "waste village" when Adam Loftus bought it. It is believed the present castle was built around 1583 for then-Archbishop Loftus. The castle was not long built when in 1600 it had to withstand an attack by the Wicklow clans during the Nine Years' War.

=== English Civil war ===
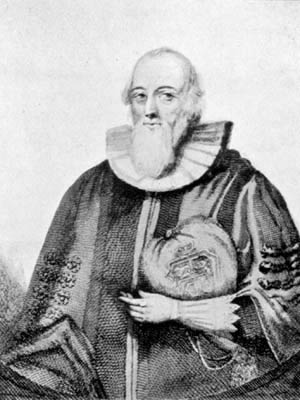
Built c. 1583 for Adam Loftus.

Archbishop Loftus left the castle to his son, Dudley and it then passed in turn to his son Adam in 1616. During Adam's ownership, the castle came under siege in the 1641 rebellion. It was able to hold out against the Confederate army when the surrounding country was overrun. Adam Loftus opposed the treaty of cessation in order to stop the fighting between the Irish Confederates and the English Royalists. Consequently, he was imprisoned in Dublin Castle.

During the subsequent Irish Confederate Wars (1641–53), the castle changed hands several times. From 1641 to 1647, it was garrisoned by English Royalist troops. In 1647, Ormonde, commander of the Royalists in Ireland, surrendered Dublin to the English Parliament and Parliamentary troops were stationed at the castle until 1649 when a few days before the Battle of Rathmines, the castle was stormed and taken without a fight by the Royalists as part of the Siege of Dublin. However, the Roundheads re-occupied it after their victory at the Battle of Rathmines. It has also been reported that Oliver Cromwell held a council there during his campaign in Ireland before going south to besiege Wexford. Adam Loftus, who recovered his castle and lands under Cromwell, sided with the Parliamentarians and was killed at the Siege of Limerick in 1651.

After the English Civil War, the Loftus family retained ownership of the castle. In 1659, Dr. Dudley Loftus, great-grandson of Archbishop Loftus, took over the castle. During his lifetime, Dudley held the posts of Commissioner of Revenue, Judge of the Court of Admiralty, Master in Chancery, representative for Kildare & Wicklow in the Protectorate Parliament and MP for Naas, Bannow and Fethard (Co Wexford). His body is interred at St. Patrick's Cathedral.

=== The eighteenth century ===
The property then passed by marriage to Philip Wharton. The young man lost his money in the South Sea Bubble and in 1723 the castle was sold for £62,000 to the Right Hon William Conolly, speaker of the Irish House of Commons. In 1742, its leasehold was sold to Dr. Hoadly, Archbishop of Armagh, and on his death four years later it passed to his son-in-law Bellingham Boyle. In 1767, Boyle sold his interest in the property to Nicholas Hume-Loftus, second Earl of Ely, a descendant of Adam Loftus, the original builder of the castle; a small head rent to the Conolly family remained.

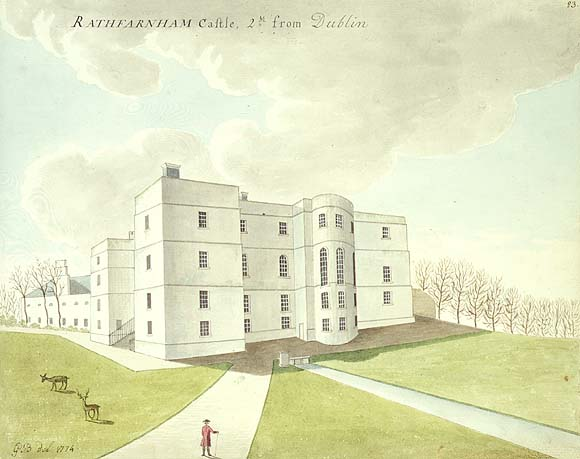
The castle in 1774

Nicholas died within a few years, probably as an indirect result of great hardships which he had suffered in his youth, and the estate passed to his uncle, Hon. Henry Loftus, who was created Earl of Ely in 1771. Henry Loftus, Earl of Ely, was responsible for much of the work of converting the medieval fortified house into a Georgian mansion, and employed renowned architects Sir William Chambers and James 'Athenian' Stuart to carry out these works. The mullioned windows were enlarged and the battlements replaced by a coping with ornamental urns. A semi-circular extension was added to the east side and an entrance porch approached by steps, on the north. The interior was decorated in accordance with the tastes of the period and leading artists, including Angelica Kauffman were employed in the work. Writers of the period who visited the house have left extravagant descriptions of its splendour.

Henry died in 1783 and was succeeded by his nephew Charles Tottenham, who subsequently became Marquess of Ely as a reward for his vote at the time of the Union.

=== The nineteenth and twentieth centuries ===
In 1812, the family leased the estate to the Ropers and removed their valuable possessions to Loftus Hall in County Wexford. The lands and castle were then used for dairy farming and fell into disrepair. To quote a contemporary account from 1838:

Crossing the Dodder by a ford, and proceeding along its southern bank towards Rathfarnham, a splendid gateway at left, accounted among the best productions of that species of architecture in Ireland, invites the tourist to explore the once beautiful grounds of Rathfarnham Castle, but they are now all eloquently waste, the undulating hills covered with rank herbage, the rivulet stagnant and sedgy, the walks scarce traceable, the ice-houses open to the prying sun, the fish-pond clogged with weeds, while the mouldering architecture of the castle, and the crumbling, unsightly offices in its immediate vicinity,…The castle, so long the residence of the Loftus family, and still the property of the Marquis of Ely, subject, however, to a small chief rent to Mr. Conolly, is an extensive fabric,.....The great hall is entered from a terrace, by a portico of eight Doric columns, which support a dome, painted in fresco with the signs of the Zodiac and other devices. This room was ornamented with antique and modern busts, placed on pedestals of variegated marble, and has three windows of stained gloss, in one of which is an escutcheon of the Loftus arms, with quarterings finely executed. Several other apartments exhibited considerable splendour of arrangement, and contained, until lately, numerous family portraits, and a valuable collection of paintings by ancient masters. But, when it is mentioned, that this structure has been for years a public dairy, and the grounds to the extent of 300 acres (1.2 km^{2}) converted to its uses, some notion may be formed of their altered condition.

In 1852, the estate was bought by the Lord Chancellor, Francis Blackburne, whose family resided there for three generations.

=== Division of the estate ===
The property developers Bailey & Gibson acquired the castle in 1912 and divided up the estate. The eastern part became the Castle Golf Club, the castle and the southwestern portion were bought in 1913 by the Jesuit Order and the northwestern part was devoted to housing.

An auction of the contents of the house occurred on the 2nd of April 1913 and was conducted by Battersby and Company. The Jesuits acquired a number of the contents.

One of the Jesuits, Father O'Leary S.J. constructed a seismograph. This machine could detect earth tremors and earthquakes from anywhere in the world and for a time, Rathfarnham Castle became a source of earthquake information for the national media. Jesuits would spend part of their religious formation, the Tertianship, at Rathfarnham.

In 1986, the Jesuits sold Rathfarnham Castle but before leaving, they removed the stained glass windows, designed by Harry Clarke, from the chapel and donated some to Tullamore Catholic Church, which had been destroyed by fire in 1983. Other windows were donated to Our Lady's Hospice in Harold's Cross, and Temple Street Children's Hospital in Dublin.

=== Preservation ===
The castle was sold to Delaware Properties in 1985 and it was feared that it was facing demolition. After immense public pressure to save the building, in 1987 it was purchased by the State and declared a National Monument. the Office of Public Works carried out extensive refurbishment throughout the castle, while keeping it open to the public during the summer months (5 May - 12 October), allowing visitors to observe conservation work, and aspects of the castle's earlier existence uncovered during the process.

== Structures ==
=== Castle ===
The castle consisted of a square building four stories high with a projecting tower at each corner, the walls of which were an average of 5 feet (1.5 m) thick. On the ground level are two vaulted apartments divided by a wall nearly 10 feet (3.0 m) thick which rises to the full height of the castle. On a level with the entrance hall are the 18th-century reception rooms and above this floor, the former ballroom, later converted into a chapel.

=== Ely's Arch ===
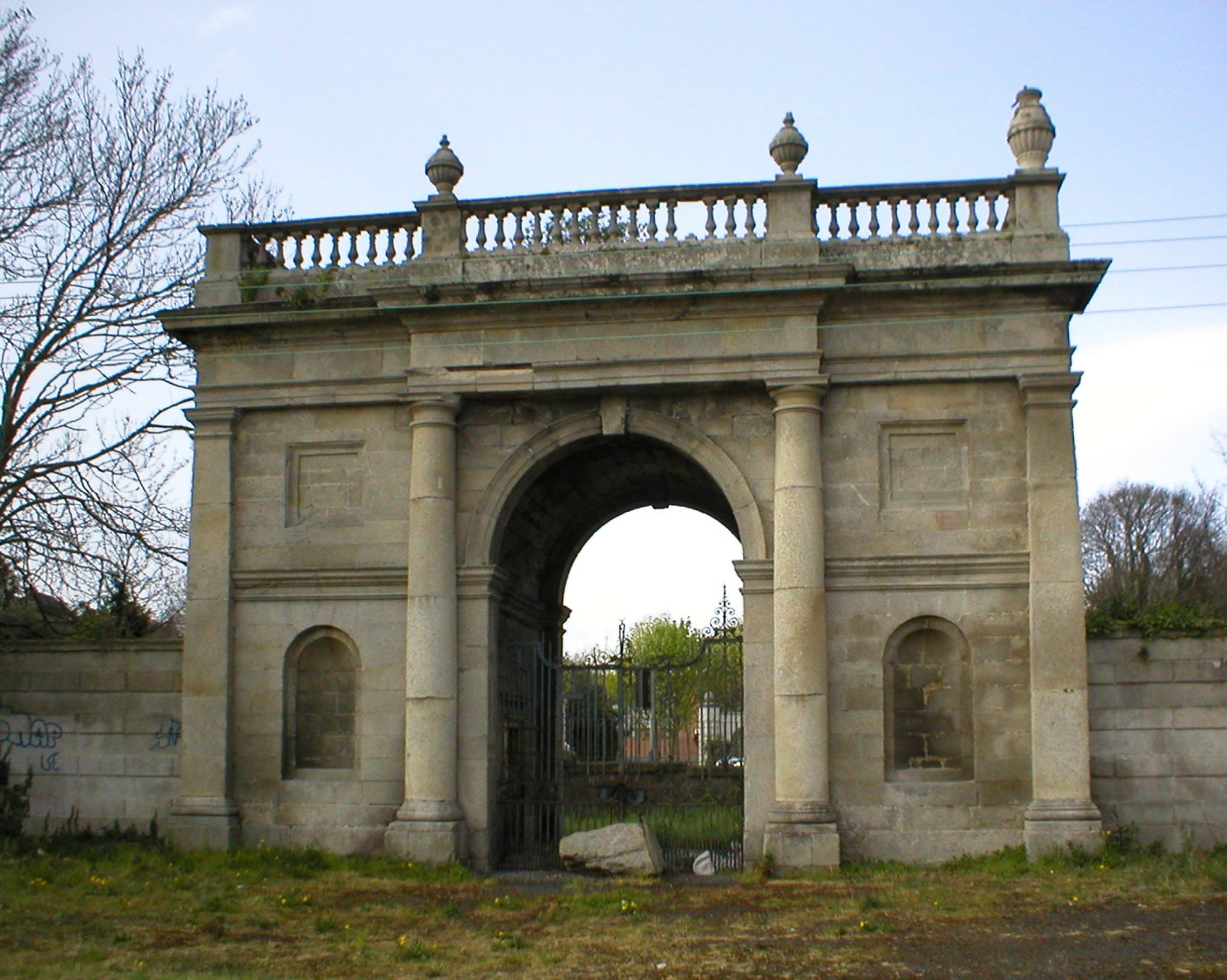
Dodder Lodge or Ely's Arch

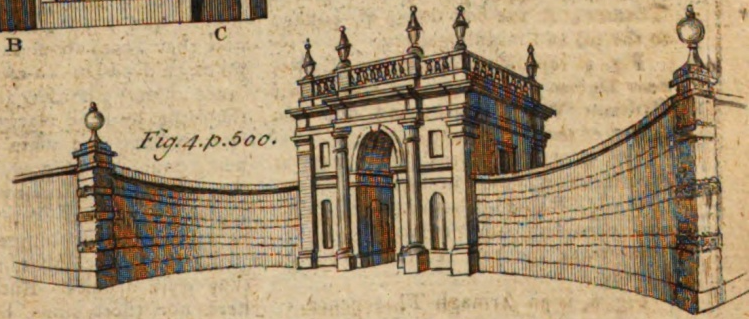
The arch from an illustration in the Gentleman's Magazine of 1789.

In commemoration of regaining ownership and of Henry being made Earl of Ely in 1771, the Loftus family constructed another entrance for the castle in the form of a Roman Triumphal Arch.

Now usually referred to Ely's arch, the triumphal entrance gate was constructed around 1769-1779 and appears on a 1779 map of Dublin when it is referred to as 'the new gate'. Various architects have been proposed as the designer although evidence of a definitive architect is scant. It is based loosely on the Porta Portese in Rome and is made of Irish granite with a coade stone keystone.

=== Palladian temple ===
Not far from the Golf Club's clubhouse was a small Palladian temple with a surrounding colonnade built of granite and brick, another relic of Lord Ely's occupation of Rathfarnham and likely constructed in the last quarter of the 18th century. It was in disrepair but could have been restored; however, by decision of the club committee, it was demolished in 1979.

=== Cromwell's Court ===
To the north of the castle was a long vaulted chamber formerly known as Cromwell’s Court or Fort. This was apparently a barn or storehouse erected as part of the castle farm and had narrow loopholes in its 5-foot (1.5 m) thick walls. In 1922, it was incorporated into a new retreat house, of which it formed the ground storey, and its character was concealed from the outside by a uniform covering of cement plaster.
