= S v Williams =

South African legal case

S v Williams, an important case in South African law, with significant implications specifically for the law of persons and criminal law, was heard in the Appellate Division of the Supreme Court on 19 September 1986, with judgment handed down on 30 September. The bench comprised Chief Justice Rabie and Judges of Appeal Corbett, Hoexter, Botha and Van Heerden, who found that, when a person is kept alive artificially by means of respirator, its eventual disconnection is not in legal terms the act which causes death; it merely constitutes the termination of a fruitless attempt to avert the consequences of the wounding. The causal connection between the wounding and the eventual death exists from beginning to end, in other words; it is not interrupted by the disconnection of the respirator. The court avoided the question of whether or not brain death, in line with medical science, should amount to legal death.

== Facts ==
The accused had broken into the home of the deceased with the intention of robbing her. On entering her bedroom, he shot her in the neck. She was still breathing on her admission to hospital. Two days later, her doctors declared that she showed no sign of brain activity. The brainstem had ceased to function; she was effectively dead. Two days further, after thorough neurologic scrutiny, the ventilator was disconnected, and after ten minutes she registered no heart activity.

== Judgment ==
Facing a charge of murder, the accused argued that the cause of death had not been the discharge of lead into the deceased's neck, but rather the disconnection of the ventilator: a novus actus interveniens. It was the doctor, in other words, who ought to be held liable for her death. Both the trial court (the Cape Provincial Division) and the Appellate Division rejected this defence. The trial court held that the moment of death occurred when the brain ceased to function, so she would have been long dead when the doctor disconnected the ventilator.

The Appellate Division found that it was unnecessary to decide on the legal propriety of this view (which was the one held by medical science), and resolved the matter instead on the basis of the "traditional view of the community," which is that one is dead when one stops breathing and one's heart stops beating.

The court emphasised that its silence on the issue of brain death should not be taken to be an indication that the approach of the trial court ought to be accepted. The question then was left open, and there remains to this day no general legal definition of death in South African law. What was clear was that, where a person is so seriously wounded that he would, in the absence of prompt medical intervention, very soon be dead, and is kept alive artificially by means of a respirator, the eventual disconnection of the respirator could not be seen as the act which caused the death. It was merely the termination of a fruitless attempt to save a life: that is, to avert the consequences of the wounding. The causal connection between the wounding of the deceased and his eventual death exists from beginning to end, and is not interrupted and eliminated by the disconnection of the respirator.

== See also ==
- Artificial respiration
- Brain death
- Death
- Law of persons in South Africa
- Murder
- South African criminal law
