= Richard Wilson Greene =

Irish barrister and judge (1791–1861)

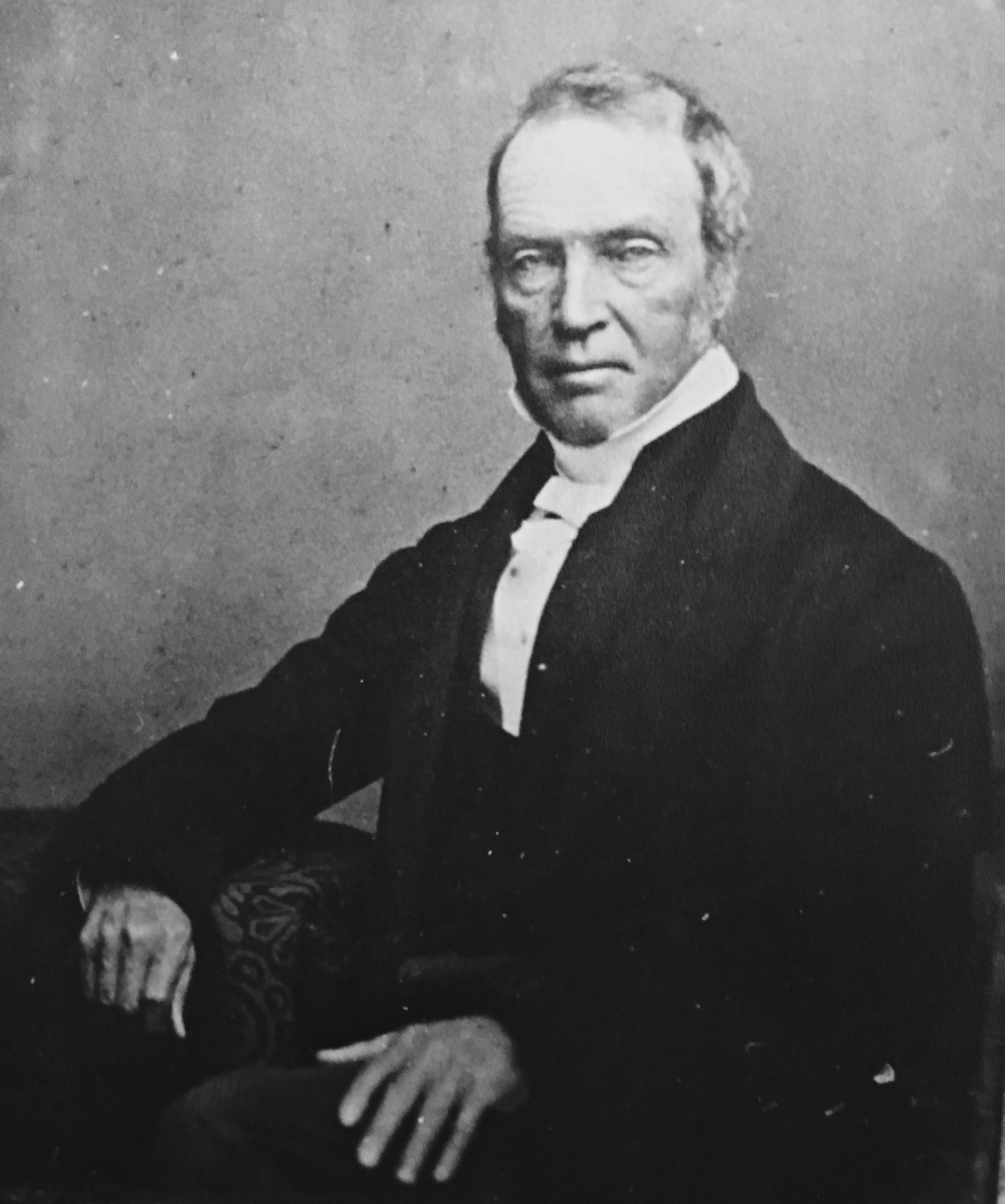
A photo of Richard Wilson Greene 1791-1861 (Irish Judge)

Richard Wilson Greene PC, KC (1791–1861) was an Irish barrister and judge.

He was born in Dublin, the son of Sir Jonas Greene, who was Recorder of Dublin from 1822 until his death in 1828, and his wife, the leading actress Marianne Hitchcock, daughter of the playwright Robert Hitchcock (died 1809) and his wife Sarah Webb. Robert, originally from York, was an author and playwright, who was deputy manager of the Theatre Royal, Dublin: he is best remembered for his book An Historical View of the Irish Stage. Sarah Hitchcock like her daughter was a very popular actress on the London and Dublin stages. Richard attended Trinity College Dublin, where he was auditor of the College Historical Society. He was called to the Bar in 1814 and became King's Counsel in 1830.

As a young barrister he attended (without a brief) the hearing of R. v Waller O'Grady, a much publicised quo warranto case concerning the power of patronage of Standish O'Grady, the Chief Baron of the Irish Exchequer, who had sought to appoint his younger son Waller to the office of Clerk of the Pleas in the Court of Exchequer. Greene co-wrote an account of the case which he published and which gained him some favourable attention.

In 1831 he was the first person to be appointed to the new position of Law Adviser to the Lord Lieutenant of Ireland, which ranked below the two senior law officers, but was nonetheless a very onerous Crown office. The choice of Greene for the position was an interesting one since he was generally regarded as a political opponent of the Government of the day. He quickly gained the respect of both political parties.

He became Solicitor-General for Ireland in 1842 and was Attorney-General for Ireland briefly in 1846. He was raised to the Bench as Baron of the Court of Exchequer (Ireland) in 1852 and served on that Court until shortly before his death in 1861.

He married Elizabeth Wilson, daughter of Thomas Wilson of Fulford, North Yorkshire in 1819, and took her surname as well as his own. They had six children, five sons and a daughter.

He made his reputation as an advocate with an impressive closing speech for the Crown at the trial of Daniel O'Connell in 1844. According to Elrington Ball, his appointment to the Bench was due to the personal regard which Lord Derby, the Prime Minister, who had known him for many years, had for him.

One of his sons was William, Dean of Christ Church Cathedral, Dublin and one of his grandsons was Sir William Conyngham Greene, a noted diplomat who became Ambassador to Japan. There was also a family connection to another eminent judge, Sir Samuel Walker, 1st Baronet, whose first wife was Greene's niece Cecilia, daughter of his brother Arthur. Another son, Richard Jonas Greene, the father of Sir William Conyngham Greene, followed his father and grandfather to the Bar. He married the children's writer Louisa Plunket. Their other children included the famous baritone Professor Harry Plunket Greene.

Legal offices
Preceded by Thomas Cusack-Smith	Solicitor-General for Ireland; 1842–1846	Succeeded by Abraham Brewster
Preceded by Thomas Cusack-Smith	Attorney-General for Ireland; February–July 1846	Succeeded by Richard Moore
