= Francis Blackburne =

Irish judge

The Right Honourable Francis Blackburne KS
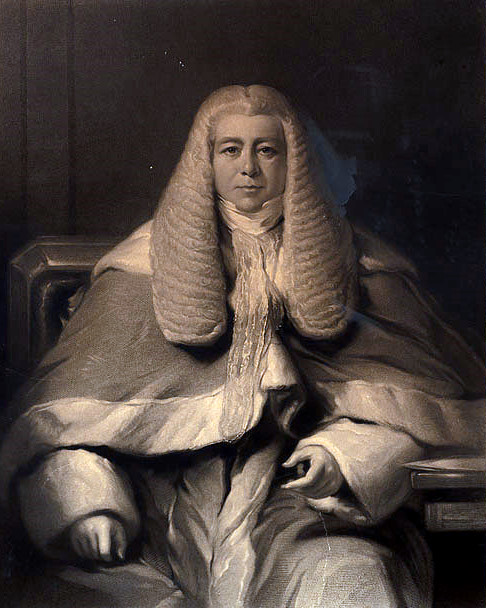

Lord Chancellor of Ireland
- In office 1866–1867
- Preceded by: Maziere Brady
- Succeeded by: Abraham Brewster

Personal details
- Born: 11 November 1782 Footstown Great
- Died: 17 September 1867 (aged 84) Rathfarnham Castle
- Education: Trinity College Dublin

Francis Blackburne PC (Ire) KS (11 November 1782 – 17 September 1867) was an Irish judge and eventually became Lord Chancellor of Ireland.

== Background ==
Born at Great Footstown in County Meath, he was the son of Richard Blackburne of Great Footstown and nephew of Anthony Blackburne, Deputy Lieutenant and High Sheriff of Meath. His mother, Elizabeth, was the daughter of Francis Hopkins (1724–1778) of Gillstown, County Meath and Darvistown, County Westmeath, a first cousin of Sir Francis Hopkins M.P., 1st Baronet of Athboy, County Meath; they were two of the great-grandsons of Ezekiel Hopkins, Bishop of Derry during the Siege of Derry, by his second wife, Araminta, daughter of John Robartes, 1st Earl of Radnor.

Blackburne was educated in Dublin at the school of Rev. William White before entering Trinity College Dublin in 1798, later winning a scholarship, gold medal (1803) and other distinctions. He finally graduated in 1806 (M.A.) and was a member of the Old Historical Society.

== Judicial career ==
He was called to the Irish Bar in 1805 and practised with great success on the home circuit. He was noted for his mastery of all branches of the Law, and his great powers of mental concentration. Blackburne was nominated a King's Counsel in 1822, and administered the Insurrection Act in Limerick for two years, effectually restoring order in the district. In 1826, he became the King's Third Serjeant-at-law and in 1830 was advanced to the Second Serjeant.

A year later, he was appointed Attorney-General for Ireland in the Whig administration of Earl Grey 'though known to be a tory ... with a view to the Irish administration having a broad political base' and on this occasion was sworn of the Privy Council of Ireland.

He held the post as Attorney-General until 1834; he was readmitted in 1841 and after serving for a year, became Master of the Rolls in Ireland. As Attorney General he clashed with Daniel O'Connell, with whom his relations were always bad, when he insisted, against O'Connell's wishes, on the appointment of Abraham Brewster as Law Adviser to the Lord Lieutenant of Ireland (in effect, a deputy to Brewster himself). Blackburne's statement that he "would not tolerate a refusal to ratify the appointment", is an indication of the influence which could then be wielded by a strong Attorney General. In 1845, he was chosen as Chief Justice of the Court of Queen's Bench. In January 1848, Blackburne sat as Lord Chief Justice, alongside Lord Chief Baron David Richard Pigot, on the Special Commission for County Clare held at Ennis to try cases arising from agrarian disturbance.

Blackburne was appointed Lord Chancellor of Ireland in February 1852, but was replaced in October. After a break of four years, he became Lord Justice of Appeal in Chancery in Ireland. In 1858, "he was invited by Lord Derby again to become lord chancellor, but he declined on account of his advanced age and failing health. He changed his mind, however, and decided to accept Derby's offer but was told that the position had been offered to and accepted by Joseph Napier".

He was bitterly disappointed, referring to the decision as "a harsh and cruel blow" and a poor reward for the sacrifices he had made. In 1866, he began a second term as Lord Chancellor, which ended with his death in the next year.

Blackburne prosecuted Daniel O'Connell (who regarded him as a personal enemy) and presided at the trial of William Smith O'Brien. From 1851, he was Vice-Chancellor of the University of Dublin.

A devoted member of the Church of Ireland, he opposed any measure hostile to its interests, arguing that an attack on the Church was an attack on the Union itself.

== Family ==
In 1809, he married Jane Martley, daughter of William Martley of Ballyfallen, County Meath and his wife Elizabeth, daughter of Richard Rothwell of Berford, County Meath. They were the parents of six sons and three daughters, of whom only five outlived their father. Blackburne bought Rathfarnham Castle in 1852, where his family continued to reside for three generations. Their son Edward Blackburne (1823–1902) inherited Rathfarnham.

== Notes ==
Legal offices
Preceded by Edward Pennefather	Attorney-General for Ireland; 1831–1834	Vacant Title next held by Louis Perrin
Preceded by David Richard Pigot	Attorney-General for Ireland; 1841–1842	Succeeded by Thomas Cusack-Smith
Preceded by Michael O'Loghlen	Master of the Rolls in Ireland; 1842–1845	Succeeded by Thomas Cusack-Smith
Preceded by Edward Pennefather	Lord Chief Justice of the Queen's Bench for Ireland; 1846–1852	Succeeded by Thomas Langlois Lefroy
Political offices
Preceded by Maziere Brady	Lord Chancellor of Ireland; February – October 1852	Succeeded by Maziere Brady
Preceded by Maziere Brady	Lord Chancellor of Ireland; 1866–1867	Succeeded by Abraham Brewster
