= Thomas Cusack-Smith =

Irish politician and judge

Sir Thomas Berry Cusack-Smith PC (1795 – 13 August 1866) was an Irish politician and judge. He was nicknamed "TBC Smith" or "Alphabet Smith".

== Family and education ==
He was the younger son of Sir William Cusack-Smith, 2nd Baronet, Baron of the Exchequer and his wife Hester Berry, daughter of Major Thomas Berry (Irish Volunteers) of Eglish Castle, sole signatory of the Birr Declaration in 1782. He was grandson of Sir Michael Smith, 1st Baronet, Master of the Rolls in Ireland from 1801 to 1806 and his first wife Maryanne Cusack. He was educated at Trinity College Dublin. He entered Lincoln's Inn in 1817 and was called to the Irish Bar in 1819. He married Louisa Smith-Barry, daughter of James Hugh Smith-Barry, of the well-known Smith-Barry family who owned Fota Island, Cork. They had one son, William and five daughters, Hester, Marianne, Anne, Caroline and Frances.

== Career ==
He was appointed Solicitor-General for Ireland briefly in 1842, and then Attorney-General for Ireland from 1842 until 1846, in which role he prosecuted Daniel O'Connell. His conduct of the trial attracted severe criticism, and the House of Lords later quashed the guilty verdict due to gross irregularities in the proceedings. He was a Member of Parliament for Ripon from 1843 to 1846. He became Master of the Rolls in Ireland in 1846, holding that office until his death, which occurred at Blairgowrie and Rattray in Scotland.

== Character and appearance ==
Like his father he had a reputation for eccentricity and bad temper: during the trial of Daniel O'Connell he challenged one of the opposing counsel, Gerald Fitzgibbon, to a duel, for having allegedly accused him of acting from "private and dishonourable motives". The judges, gravely embarrassed, strongly criticised Cusack-Smith for his actions and persuaded him to drop the matter. To the public, a particularly startling aspect of the matter was that Fitzgibbon's wife and daughter were present in Court throughout. Cussck-Smith's frequent outbursts of ill-temper were attributed by his friends to chronic indigestion.

An admirer described him as having "a touch of genius" but admitted that he was rough and harsh in manner. Charles Gavan Duffy described him as "dignified" but so unhealthy and ghastly in appearance that he resembled "an owl in daylight". Daniel O'Connell called him "the vinegar cruet".

== Sources ==
- Concise Dictionary of National Biography

Parliament of the United Kingdom
Preceded by Thomas Pemberton Leigh; George Cockburn	Member of Parliament for Ripon; 1843 – 1846; With: George Cockburn	Succeeded by Edwin Lascelles; George Cockburn
Legal offices
Preceded by Joseph Devonsher Jackson	Solicitor-General for Ireland; Sep-Nov 1842	Succeeded by Richard Wilson Greene
Preceded by Francis Blackburne	Attorney-General for Ireland; 1842 – 1846	Succeeded by Richard Wilson Greene
Preceded by Francis Blackburne	Master of the Rolls in Ireland; 1846–1866	Succeeded by John Edward Walsh
