= Court of Chancery (Ireland) =

Court in the Irish legal system

- Established: 1292
- Dissolved: 1877
- Jurisdiction: Lordship of Ireland, Kingdom of Ireland, and Ireland within the United Kingdom
- Location: Dublin, from 18th century within Four Courts, Inns Quay

Lord Chancellor of Ireland

The Court of Chancery was a court which exercised equitable jurisdiction in Ireland until its abolition as part of the reform of the court system in 1877. It was the court in which the Lord Chancellor of Ireland presided. Its final sitting place was at the Four Courts in Dublin, which still stands.

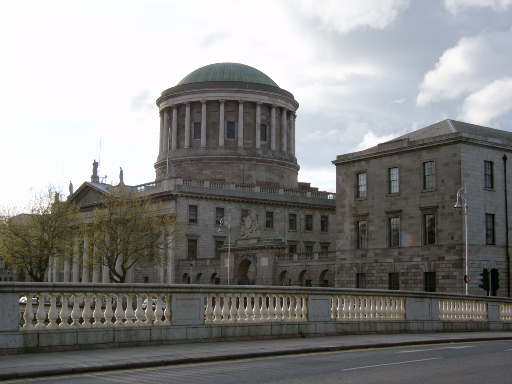
Four Courts, Dublin, present day

== History ==
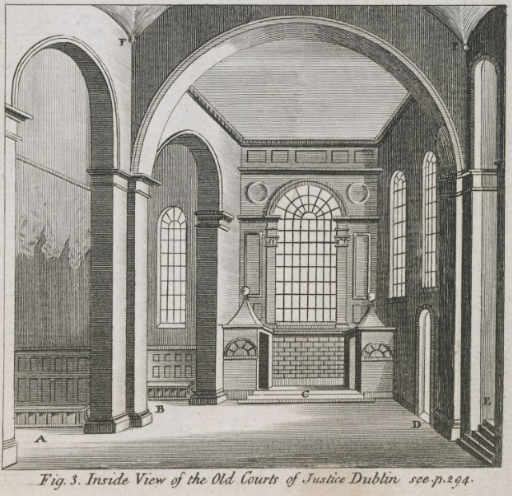
Location of the old Court of Chancery within the Four Courts complex on St Michael's Hill beside Christchurch cathedral noted 'C' on the illustration.

The Chancery in Ireland was set up in 1232, following the model of the Court of Chancery of England. The court was abolished under the Supreme Court of Judicature Act (Ireland) 1877 and its jurisdiction transferred to the Chancery Division of the newly established High Court of Justice in Ireland, while the Lord Chancellor presided over the Court of Appeal in Ireland. In 1920, the High Court was split into separate courts for Northern Ireland and Southern Ireland under the Government of Ireland Act 1920. While the Northern Ireland court still maintains a separate Chancery Division, the Irish Free State abolished the divisions of the High Court under the Courts of Justice Act 1924. The High Court of Ireland still maintains a "chancery list", although any judge of the Court may now exercise its jurisdiction in equity.

== Lord Chancellor of Ireland ==
In the early centuries of the office, the Lord Chancellor was a senior cleric, usually though not invariably an Englishman by birth. In the 15th and 16th centuries, a nobleman sometimes held the office, acting through a deputy. From the Reformation on, he was usually a trained lawyer, though the practice of appointing a senior cleric only ended with Michael Boyle, Archbishop of Armagh, who retired in 1686.

In addition to his judicial functions, the Lord Chancellor had a key political role. Until the Acts of Union 1800, he was Speaker of the Irish House of Lords even though he often did not hold a peerage. After the Union, he was still required to advise both British and Irish Governments on a range of political and legal matters. He was often called on to steer legislation through the House of Lords: Lord O'Hagan was created a peer so that he might assist in passing the Supreme Court of Judicature Act.

== Other office-holders ==
The office of Master of the Rolls in Ireland existed from the 14th century. Originally his functions were clerical, but in time he became in effect an assistant Lord Chancellor. In the 17th and 18th centuries, the office was notoriously a sinecure for absentee English politicians, but from 1800 on a determined effort was made to appoint judges of real ability.

In 1867 a new office of Vice-Chancellor was created to assist the Master of the Rolls at first instance. It was abolished in 1904; throughout its existence, the office was only held by one man, Hedges Eyre Chatterton.

The Court of Appeal in Chancery in Ireland was created in 1857. The Lord Chancellor sat as a judge of appeal, with a single Lord Justice of Appeal in Chancery in Ireland to assist him. The drawback to this arrangement was that the two might disagree as Lord O'Hagan and Jonathan Christian frequently did. In contrast, when the Court of Appeal in Ireland was set up in 1878, it sat as a bench of three.

== Business of the Court ==
Originally the Lord Chancellor was "keeper of the king's conscience", charged with giving relief in any case where the courts of common law could not supply a remedy. In time, as in England, equity developed into a fully-fledged legal system in its own right, parallel to the common law.

James Roderick O'Flanagan, writing in 1870, examined the Calendar of the Irish Court of Chancery in the reigns of Henry VIII and Elizabeth I, and found the ordinary business of the Court then to be quite similar to that of his own time: injunctions to stay proceedings in a common law court, proceedings to compel a trustee to make over an estate to the plaintiff, discovery of deeds, and actions to set aside deeds obtained by fraud.

Apart from the ordinary business of the Court, certain functions were reserved to the Lord Chancellor: care of minors and wards of court, discipline of solicitors and coroners, and removal of justices of the peace. In 1924 the special functions of the Lord Chancellor were vested in the Chief Justice of Ireland; in 1936 responsibility for minors and wards of court was transferred to the President of the High Court and in 1960 discipline of solicitors was transferred to the President of the High Court.
