= Abraham Brewster =

Irish jurist

The Right Honourable Abraham Brewster
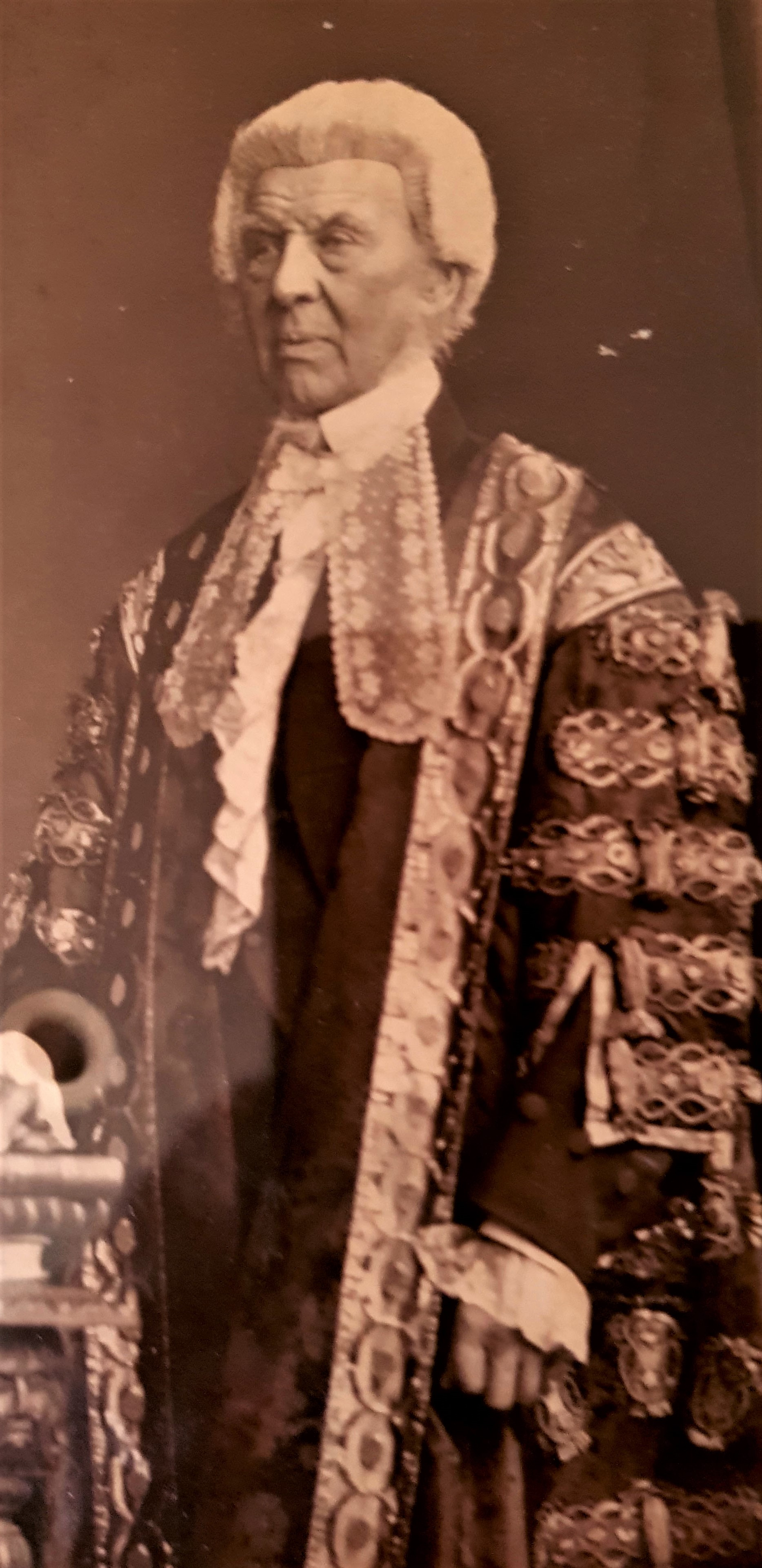
- Right Honourable Abraham Brewster photographed by Thomas Cranfield, 1861

Lord Chancellor of Ireland
- In office 1867–1868
- Preceded by: Francis Blackburne
- Succeeded by: Thomas O'Hagan, 1st Baron O'Hagan

Attorney-General for Ireland
- In office 1853–1855
- Preceded by: Joseph Napier
- Succeeded by: William Keogh

Solicitor-General for Ireland
- In office February 1846 – June 1846
- Preceded by: Richard Wilson Greene
- Succeeded by: James Henry Monahan

Personal details
- Born: 1796
- Died: 26 July 1874 (aged 77–78) Dublin, Ireland
- Spouse: Mary Ann Gray
- Children: 1 son, 1 daughter
- Education: Kilkenny College, Trinity College Dublin
- Occupation: Judge, Politician

Abraham Brewster PC (Ire) (April 1796 – 26 July 1874) was an Irish judge and Lord Chancellor of Ireland.

== Background and education ==
Brewster was born at Ballinulta, the son of William Bagenal Brewster, of Ballinulta, County Wicklow, by his wife Mary, daughter of Thomas Bates. He received his earlier education at Kilkenny College, then proceeded to Trinity College Dublin in 1812, took his B.A. degree in 1817, and long after, in 1847, his M.A. degree.

== Legal and judicial career ==
Brewster was called to the Irish bar in 1819, and, having chosen Leinster for his circuit, soon acquired the reputation of a sound lawyer and a powerful speaker. Lord Plunket honoured him with a silk gown on 13 July 1835. Notwithstanding the opposition of Daniel O'Connell, who disliked him, he was appointed Law Adviser to the Lord Lieutenant of Ireland on 10 October 1841, and was Solicitor-General for Ireland from 2 February 1846 until 16 July. By the influence of his friend Sir James Graham, First Lord of the Admiralty, he was Attorney-General for Ireland from 10 January 1853 until the fall of the Aberdeen ministry on 10 February 1855.

In 1854, Brewster was appointed to the Royal Commission for Consolidating the Statute Law, a royal commission to consolidate existing statutes and enactments of English law.

Brewster was very active in almost all branches of his profession after his resignation, and his reputation as an advocate may be gathered from the pages of the Irish Law and Equity Reports, and in the later series of the Irish Common Law Reports, the Irish Chancery Reports, and the Irish Jurist, in all of which his name very frequently appears. Among the most important cases in which he took part were the Mountgarrett case in 1854, involving a peerage and an estate of £10,000 a year; the Carden abduction case in July of the same year; the Yelverton case, 1861; the Egmont will case, 1863; the Marquess of Donegall's ejectment action; and lastly, the great will cause of Fitzgerald v. Fitzgerald, in which Brewster's statement for the plaintiff is said to have been one of his most successful efforts.

On Lord Derby becoming prime minister, Brewster succeeded Francis Blackburne as Lord Justice of Appeal in Ireland in July 1866, and Lord Chancellor of Ireland in the month of March following. As Lord Chancellor, he sat in his court for the last time on 17 December 1868, when Benjamin Disraeli's government resigned. He then retired from public life.

There are in print only three or four judgments delivered by him, either in the Court of Appeal or the Court of Chancery (Ireland). As far back as January 1853, he had been made a Privy Counsellor in Ireland. His judicial manner was quiet, but with what was called "a touch of serviceable fierceness" which kept order in Court. He was highly regarded by his colleagues; even the bitter-tongued Jonathan Christian, who despised most of his fellow judges, deferred to Brewster.

== Family ==
Brewster died at his residence, 26 Merrion Square South, Dublin, on 26 July 1874, and was buried at Tullow, County Carlow, on 30 July. By his marriage in 1819 with Mary Ann, daughter of Robert Gray of Upton House, County Carlow, who died in Dublin on 24 November 1862, he had issue one son, Colonel William Bagenal Brewster, and one daughter, Elizabeth Mary, wife of Mr. Henry French, both of whom died in the lifetime of their father. His estates were inherited by Elizabeth's son Robert French-Brewster, who adopted his grandfather's surname. A nephew, Edward Brewster, studied under Abraham Brewster and became a lawyer and politician in New South Wales. Edward's brother John Grey Brewster also emigrated to Australia, where he became a prosperous grazier and company director: in later years he retired to England, where he died in 1897.

== Notes ==
Legal offices
Preceded by Richard Wilson Greene	Solicitor-General for Ireland; February–June 1846	Succeeded by James Henry Monahan
Preceded by Joseph Napier	Attorney-General for Ireland; 1853–1855	Succeeded by William Keogh
Preceded by Francis Blackburne	Lord Chancellor of Ireland; 1867–1868	Succeeded by The Lord O'Hagan
