= Jonathan Christian =

Irish judge

Jonathan Christian, SL, QC, PC (I) (17 February 1808 in Carrick-on-Suir, County Tipperary – 29 October 1887 in Dublin), was an Irish judge. He served as Solicitor-General for Ireland from 1856 to 1858. He was a judge of the Court of Common Pleas (Ireland) from 1858 to 1867 when he was appointed Lord Justice of Appeal in Chancery. On the creation of the new Irish Court of Appeal in 1878 he served briefly on that Court, but retired after a few months.

Christian was considered one of the best Irish lawyers of his time, but as a judge, he regularly courted controversy. His bitter and sarcastic temper and open contempt for most of his colleagues led to frequent clashes both in Court and in the Press. Though he was rebuked for misconduct several times by the House of Commons, no serious thought seems to have been given to removing him from office.

== Family ==
He was born in Carrick-on-Suir, third son of George Christian, a solicitor, and his wife Margaret Cormack. He was educated at the Trinity College Dublin, entered Gray's Inn in 1831 and was called to the Irish Bar in 1834. He married Mary Thomas in 1859 and had four sons and four daughters. He lived at Ravenswell, Bray, County Wicklow.

== Early career ==
His early years at the Bar were not successful, and he admitted to being near to despair at times about his prospects. His practice lay in the Court of Chancery (Ireland): Chancery procedures then were extremely complex and he found them at first almost unintelligible. Gradually he mastered the intricacies of Chancery practice became a leader of the Bar, and took silk in 1841. It was said that his expertise in Chancery procedures left even the Lord Chancellor himself quite unable to argue with him.

He was appointed Law Adviser to the Lord Lieutenant of Ireland, an influential post which involved assisting the Attorney General and Solicitor General in advising the Crown in 1850, but resigned after only a few months, on the ground that it interfered with his private practice. He was appointed Third Sergeant later the same year but resigned in 1855, allegedly because he was disappointed at not receiving further promotion. Promotion did in time come his way: he was appointed Solicitor General the following year and a judge of the Court of Common Pleas in 1858. He was unusual in having no strong political loyalty: it was said that his political allegiance was known only to himself.

== Controversy ==
As a judge of the Court of Common Pleas, Christian got on well with his colleagues, and any dissenting judgements he wrote were short and courteous. It was after his appointment as a Lord Justice of Appeal in Chancery in 1867 that his behaviour began to attract unfavourable comment, as he went out of his way to court controversy on a wide variety of topics.

=== Law Reports ===
Christian developed a deep contempt for the Irish Reports, castigating them in open Court as "nonsense", "worthless rubbish" and "disjointed twaddle". All attempts by colleagues to get him to moderate his language failed. Christian threatened to refuse to let his judgements be reported, and in his last years, his relations with the law reporters were so bad that they simply published their uncorrected notes of his decisions rather than sending them to the judge for revision.

=== Vice-Chancellor ===
In 1867 a new office of Vice-Chancellor for Ireland was created; it was filled throughout its existence by one man, Hedges Eyre Chatterton, who retired in 1904. Despite his length of service, he was not considered a judge of the first rank, and Christian evidently combined feelings of professional contempt with a personal dislike for him. Christian usually voted on appeals to overturn his judgments, and frequently added personal attacks on Chatterton, despite protests from his colleagues. The feud between the two judges reached the Press in 1870 when the Irish Times, without naming them, quoted one judge's opinion that another was "lazy, stupid, conceited and dogmatic". Although Christian denied it, it was universally believed that he was the author of the remarks, which were aimed at Chatterton. Chatterton was fortunate in enjoying the support of the Lord Chancellor of Ireland, Thomas O'Hagan, 1st Baron O'Hagan, who was also on bad terms with Christian.

=== Lord O'Hagan ===
Christian had worked well with Abraham Brewster, O'Hagan's predecessor, whom he respected. For O'Hagan on the other hand he felt the same dislike and contempt which he felt for Chatterton. Although they had served together in the Court of Common Pleas without any obvious conflict, Christian considered O'Hagan's appointment as Lord Chancellor to be a purely political act, and that he was unfit to be either head of the judiciary or an appeal judge in Chancery; he also complained of what he saw as O'Hagan's laziness, which put an extra burden on him. During O'Hagan's first term as Chancellor Christian subjected him to constant criticism; unwisely he did not confine these attacks to the Courtroom but published numerous pamphlets, which was widely seen as improper conduct in a judge. When O'Hagan became Chancellor for the second time, a friend congratulated him on escaping from "the misnamed Christian " who had retired two years earlier.

It was probably his feud with O'Hagan which led to his extraordinary decision to publicly attack the House of Lords for reversing, by a majority including O'Hagan, his judgment in O'Rorke v Bolingbroke. In a letter to The Times in 1877, whose content has been described as "astounding", Christian questioned the Law Lords knowledge of equity: while he singled out Lord Blackburn for criticism, it is likely that he also intended to harm O'Hagan's reputation.

=== Irish Land Acts ===
A major source of contention between Christian and O'Hagan was the First Irish Land Act 1870, which O'Hagan steered through Parliament. The Act provided for compensation for tenants in the event of eviction. Christian, though he was not a landowner and was not as a rule much interested in politics, objected strongly to the policy of the Act, which he believed to be most unjust to landlords. His attacks from the Bench on the Act led to serious rebukes both from the House of Commons and from the Press, which commented on the impropriety of a judge attacking an Act of Parliament, which it was his duty to enforce.

== Later years ==
O'Hagan's retirement did nothing to lessen Christian's ill-temper; other judges came in for attack, including Chief Justice James Whiteside, whom he accused of speaking constantly on matters of which he was ignorant. In his later years, he seems to have been a lonely and isolated figure: his vigorous opposition to the Supreme Court of Judicature (Ireland) Act 1877 was entirely unsuccessful. A feeling of isolation may partly explain his decision to retire, though certainly his increasing deafness also played a part.

== Assessment ==
Delaney praises Christian as a great master of equity, a man of great learning and a judge with a great desire to see justice done, but he does not deny that Christian loved controversy. Even his supporters spoke of "arrows too sharply pointed "; critics spoke of his "spirit of personal sarcasm, cold, keen and cynical". No doubt Christian was genuinely concerned to uphold high standards of judicial conduct, but as Hogan points out, his own conduct struck most observers as far more improper than anything he complained of in others.

== Arms ==
Coat of arms of Jonathan Christian

Crest
Out of a naval crown a unicorn's head Proper.
Escutcheon
Party per pale Azure and Or dexter a chevron couped between three urns Argent sinister an eagle displayed Proper.
Motto
Salus Per Christum

Legal offices
Preceded by John FitzGerald	Solicitor-General for Ireland; 1856–1858	Succeeded by Henry George Hughes
