= Palmerston ministry =

Palmerston ministry may refer to:

- First Palmerston ministry, the British minority (later majority) government led by Lord Palmerston from 1855 to 1858
- Second Palmerston ministry, the British majority government led by Lord Palmerston from 1859 to 1865
