= First Palmerston ministry =

Government of the United Kingdom

- 1855–1858
- Palmerston (1857)
- Date formed: 6 February 1855
- Date dissolved: 19 February 1858

People and organisations
- Monarch: Victoria
- Prime Minister: Henry John Temple, 3rd Viscount Palmerston
- Total no. of members: 110 appointments
- Member party: Whig Party
- Status in legislature: Minority (1855–1857); Majority (1857–1858)
- Opposition party: Conservative Party
- Opposition leaders: Benjamin Disraeli in the House of Commons; Earl of Derby in the House of Lords

History
- Election: 1857 general election
- Legislature terms: 16th UK Parliament lost a vote of confidence; 17th UK Parliament lost a vote of confidence
- Predecessor: Aberdeen ministry
- Successor: Second Derby–Disraeli ministry

Lord Palmerston, of the Whigs, first formed a government by popular demand in 1855, after the resignation of the Aberdeen Coalition. Initially, the government was a continuation of the previous coalition administration but lost three Peelites (William Ewart Gladstone, Sir James Graham and Sidney Herbert) within a few weeks. However, other Peelites like the Duke of Argyll and Lord Canning remained in office. Palmerston was heavily criticised by Parliament in 1857 over the conduct of the Second Opium War and called a dissolution, but the nation voiced its support in the resulting general election and he returned with a Whig majority.

In 1858, the Government resigned when defeated (on a measure for removing conspiracies to murder abroad from the class of misdemeanour to that of felony, which was introduced in consequence of Felice Orsini's attempt on the life of Napoleon III the emperor of the French) and was succeeded by another short-lived Conservative government under Disraeli and Lord Derby.

== Cabinet ==
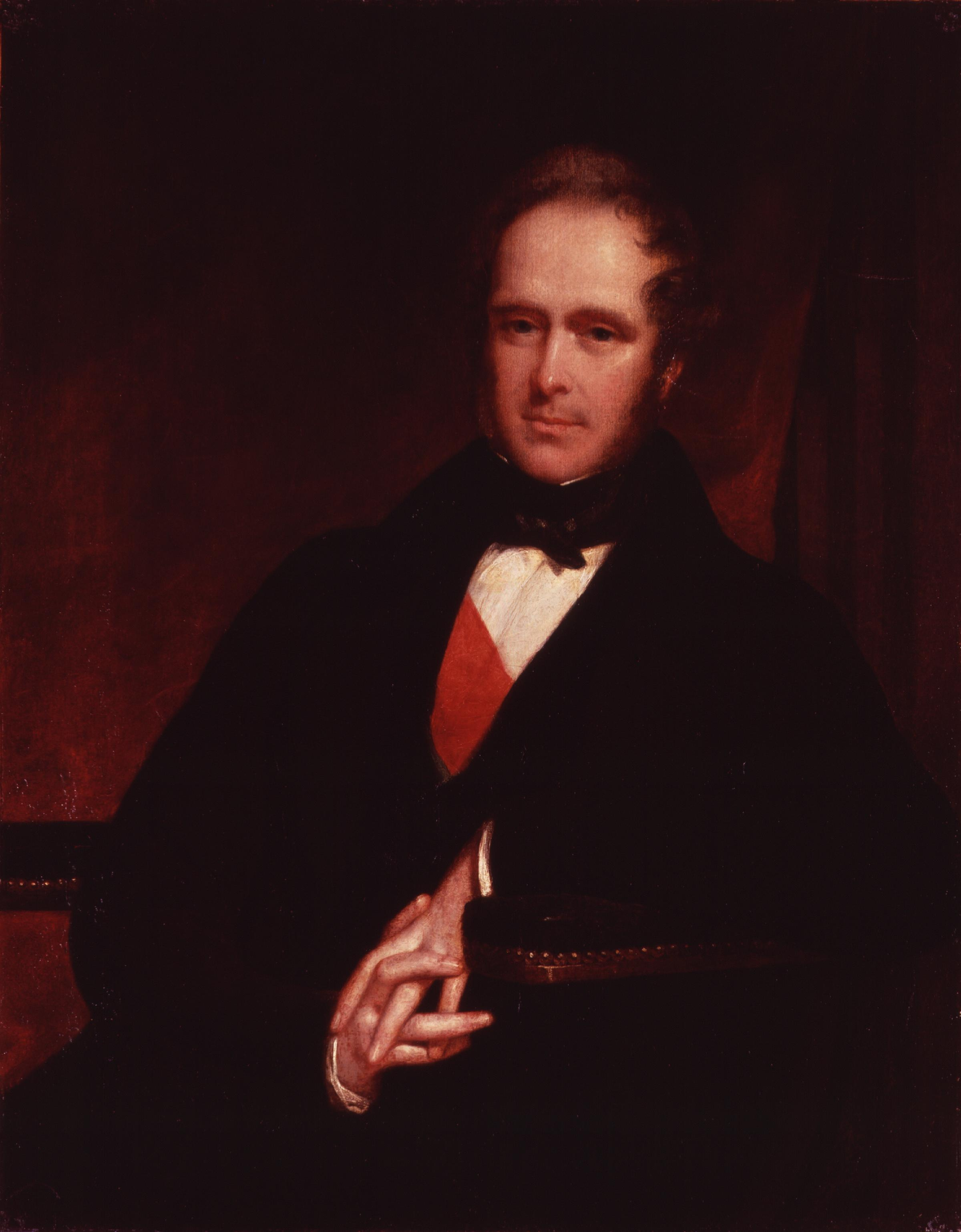
Portrait of Lord Palmerston by John Partridge

=== February 1855 – February 1858 ===
Cabinet members
Portfolio	Minister	Took office	Left office
First Lord of the Treasury; Leader of the House of Commons	Henry John Temple, 3rd Viscount Palmerston (head of ministry)	6 February 1855	21 February 1858
Lord Chancellor	Robert Rolfe, 1st Baron Cranworth	28 December 1852	21 February 1858
Lord President of the Council; Leader of the House of Lords	Granville Leveson-Gower, 2nd Earl Granville	8 February 1855	21 February 1858
Lord Privy Seal	George Campbell, 8th Duke of Argyll	4 January 1853	7 December 1855
Lord Privy Seal	Dudley Ryder, 2nd Earl of Harrowby	7 December 1855	3 February 1858
Lord Privy Seal	Ulick de Burgh, 1st Marquess of Clanricarde	3 February 1858	21 February 1858
Secretary of State for the Home Department	Sir George Grey, 2nd Baronet	8 February 1855	26 February 1858
Secretary of State for Foreign Affairs	George Villiers, 4th Earl of Clarendon	21 February 1853	26 February 1858
Secretary of State for the Colonies	Sidney Herbert	8 February 1855	21 February 1855
Secretary of State for the Colonies	Lord John Russell	23 February 1855	21 July 1855
Secretary of State for the Colonies	Sir William Molesworth, 8th Baronet	21 July 1855	22 October 1855
Secretary of State for the Colonies	Henry Labouchere	21 November 1855	21 October 1858
Secretary of State for War	Fox Maule-Ramsay, Lord Panmure	8 February 1855	21 February 1858
First Lord of the Admiralty	Sir James Graham, 2nd Baronet	30 December 1852	13 March 1855
First Lord of the Admiralty	Sir Charles Wood, 3rd Baronet	13 March 1855	8 March 1858
Chancellor of the Exchequer	William Ewart Gladstone	30 December 1852	5 March 1855
Chancellor of the Exchequer	Sir George Cornewall Lewis, 2nd Baronet	5 March 1855	26 February 1858
President of the Board of Control	Sir Charles Wood, 3rd Baronet	30 December 1852	3 May 1855
President of the Board of Control	Robert Vernon	3 May 1855	21 February 1858
President of the Board of Trade	Edward Stanley, 2nd Baron Stanley of Alderley	27 November 1855	21 February 1858
Chancellor of the Duchy of Lancaster	Dudley Ryder, 2nd Earl of Harrowby	31 March 1855	7 December 1855
Chancellor of the Duchy of Lancaster	Matthew Talbot Baines	7 December 1855	21 February 1858
First Commissioner of Works	Sir William Molesworth, 8th Baronet	5 January 1853	21 July 1855
Postmaster General	Charles Canning, 2nd Viscount Canning	5 January 1853	1855
Postmaster General	George Campbell, 8th Duke of Argyll	30 November 1855	21 February 1858
Minister without portfolio	Henry Petty-Fitzmaurice, 3rd Marquess of Lansdowne	28 December 1852	21 February 1858

==== Changes ====
- Later in February 1855 – Sir George Cornewall Lewis succeeds Gladstone as Chancellor of the Exchequer. Lord John Russell succeeds Herbert as Colonial Secretary. Sir Charles Wood succeeds Sir James Graham as First Lord of the Admiralty. R.V. Smith succeeds Wood as President of the Board of Control
- July 1855 – Sir William Molesworth succeeds Russell as Colonial Secretary. Molesworth's successor as First Commissioner of Public Works is not in the Cabinet.
- November 1855 – Henry Labouchere succeeds Molesworth as Colonial Secretary
- December 1855 – The Duke of Argyll succeeds Lord Canning as Postmaster-General. Lord Harrowby succeeds Argyll as Lord Privy Seal. Harrowby's successor as Chancellor of the Duchy of Lancaster is not in the Cabinet
- 1857 – Matthew Talbot Baines, the Chancellor of the Duchy of Lancaster, enters the Cabinet.
- February 1858 – Lord Clanricarde succeeds Harrowby as Lord Privy Seal.

== List of ministers ==
Members of the Cabinet are indicated by bold face.

Office	Name	Date	Notes
Prime Minister, First Lord of the Treasury and Leader of the House of Commons	Henry Temple, 3rd Viscount Palmerston	6 February 1855 – 21 February 1858	
Chancellor of the Exchequer	William Ewart Gladstone	30 December 1852	continued in office
Chancellor of the Exchequer	Sir George Cornewall Lewis	28 February 1855	
Parliamentary Secretary to the Treasury	William Goodenough Hayter	5 January 1853	continued in office
Financial Secretary to the Treasury	James Wilson	5 January 1853	continued in office
Junior Lords of the Treasury	Lord Alfred Hervey	1 January 1853 – 7 March 1855	continued in office
Junior Lords of the Treasury	Francis Charteris, Lord Elcho	1 January 1853 – 7 March 1855	continued in office
Junior Lords of the Treasury	Chichester Fortescue	6 March 1854 – 16 April 1855	continued in office
Junior Lords of the Treasury	Charles Stanley Monck, 4th Viscount Monck	7 March 1855 – 21 February 1858	
Junior Lords of the Treasury	Adam Haldane-Duncan, Viscount Duncan	7 March 1855 – 21 February 1858	
Junior Lords of the Treasury	Henry Brand	16 April 1855 – 21 February 1858	
Lord Chancellor	Robert Rolfe, 1st Baron Cranworth	28 December 1852	continued in office
Lord President of the Council and Leader of the House of Lords	Granville Leveson-Gower, 2nd Earl Granville	8 February 1855	
Lord Privy Seal	George Campbell, 8th Duke of Argyll	4 January 1853	continued in office
Lord Privy Seal	Dudley Ryder, 2nd Earl of Harrowby	7 December 1855	
Lord Privy Seal	Ulick de Burgh, 1st Marquess of Clanricarde	3 February 1858	
Secretary of State for the Home Department	Sir George Grey, 2nd Baronet	8 February 1855	
Under-Secretary of State for the Home Department	Henry Fitzroy	28 December 1852	continued in office
Under-Secretary of State for the Home Department	William Cowper	16 February 1855	
Under-Secretary of State for the Home Department	William Nathaniel Massey	13 August 1855	
Secretary of State for Foreign Affairs	George Villiers, 4th Earl of Clarendon	21 February 1853	continued in office
Parliamentary Under-Secretary of State for Foreign Affairs	John Wodehouse, 3rd Baron Wodehouse	28 December 1852	continued in office
Parliamentary Under-Secretary of State for Foreign Affairs	Henry Petty-Fitzmaurice, Earl of Shelburne	5 July 1856	
Secretary of State for War	Fox Maule-Ramsay, Lord Panmure	8 February 1855	
Under-Secretary of State for War	Frederick Peel	February 1855	
Under-Secretary of State for War	Sir John Ramsden	May 1857	
Secretary of State for the Colonies	Sidney Herbert	8 February 1855	
Secretary of State for the Colonies	Lord John Russell	23 February 1855	
Secretary of State for the Colonies	Sir William Molesworth, 8th Baronet	21 July 1855	
Secretary of State for the Colonies	Henry Labouchere	21 November 1855	
Under-Secretary of State for the Colonies	John Ball	8 February 1855	
Under-Secretary of State for the Colonies	Chichester Fortescue	June 1857	
First Lord of the Admiralty	Sir James Graham, 2nd Baronet	30 December 1852	continued in office
First Lord of the Admiralty	Sir Charles Wood, 3rd Baronet	13 March 1855	
First Secretary of the Admiralty	Ralph Bernal Osborne	6 January 1853	continued in office
Civil Lord of the Admiralty	Sir Robert Peel, 3rd Baronet	13 March 1855	
Civil Lord of the Admiralty	Thomas Baring	27 May 1857	
President of the Board of Control	Sir Charles Wood, 3rd Baronet	30 December 1852	continued in office
President of the Board of Control	Robert Vernon Smith	3 March 1855	
Joint Secretary to the Board of Control	Henry Danby Seymour	3 April 1855	
Chancellor of the Duchy of Lancaster	vacant		
Chancellor of the Duchy of Lancaster	Dudley Ryder, 2nd Earl of Harrowby	31 March 1855	
Chancellor of the Duchy of Lancaster	Matthew Talbot Baines	7 December 1855	
Minister without Portfolio	Henry Petty-FitzMaurice, 3rd Marquess of Lansdowne	28 December 1852 – 21 February 1858	
Postmaster-General	Charles Canning, 2nd Viscount Canning	5 January 1853	continued in office
Postmaster-General	George Campbell, 8th Duke of Argyll	30 November 1855	
President of the Board of Trade	Edward Cardwell	28 December 1852	continued in office
President of the Board of Trade	Edward Stanley, 2nd Baron Stanley of Alderley	31 March 1855	entered the Cabinet 27 November 1855
Vice-President of the Board of Trade	Edward Stanley, 2nd Baron Stanley of Alderley	4 January 1853	continued in office
Vice-President of the Board of Trade	Edward Pleydell-Bouverie	31 March 1855	
Vice-President of the Board of Trade	Robert Lowe	13 August 1855	
First Commissioner of Works	Sir William Molesworth, 8th Baronet	5 January 1853	continued in office
First Commissioner of Works	Sir Benjamin Hall	21 July 1855	
Vice-President of the Committee on Education	William Cowper	5 February 1857	
President of the Board of Health	Sir Benjamin Hall	14 January 1854	continued in office
President of the Board of Health	William Cowper	13 August 1855	
President of the Board of Health	William Monsell	9 February 1857	
President of the Board of Health	William Cowper	24 September 1857	
Chief Secretary for Ireland	Sir John Young	6 January 1853	continued in office
Chief Secretary for Ireland	Edward Horsman	1 March 1855	
Chief Secretary for Ireland	Henry Arthur Herbert	27 May 1857	
Lord Lieutenant of Ireland	George Howard, 7th Earl of Carlisle	7 March 1855	
Master-General of the Ordnance	Fitzroy Somerset, 1st Baron Raglan	30 September 1852	Board of Ordnance abolished 25 May 1855 and duties vested in Secretary of State for War; the post of Surveyor-General remained but was not filled.
Lieutenant-General of the Ordnance	Sir Hew Dalrymple Ross	6 May 1854	Board of Ordnance abolished 25 May 1855 and duties vested in Secretary of State for War; the post of Surveyor-General remained but was not filled.
Surveyor-General of the Ordnance	vacant	—	Board of Ordnance abolished 25 May 1855 and duties vested in Secretary of State for War; the post of Surveyor-General remained but was not filled.
Storekeeper of the Ordnance	Sir Thomas Hastings	25 July 1845	Board of Ordnance abolished 25 May 1855 and duties vested in Secretary of State for War; the post of Surveyor-General remained but was not filled.
Clerk of the Ordnance	William Monsell	13 January 1853	clerkship abolished 1857
Paymaster General	Edward Stanley, 2nd Baron Stanley of Alderley	4 January 1853	continued in office
Paymaster General	Edward Pleydell-Bouverie	31 March 1855	
Paymaster General	Robert Lowe	13 August 1855	
President of the Poor Law Board	Matthew Talbot Baines	30 December 1852	continued in office
President of the Poor Law Board	Edward Pleydell-Bouverie	13 August 1855	
Parliamentary Secretary to the Poor Law Board	Grenville Berkeley	7 January 1853	continued in office
Parliamentary Secretary to the Poor Law Board	Ralph Grey	9 May 1856	
Attorney General	Sir Alexander Cockburn, 12th Baronet	28 December 1852	continued in office
Attorney General	Sir Richard Bethell	15 November 1856	
Solicitor General	Sir Richard Bethell	28 December 1852	continued in office
Solicitor General	James Stuart-Wortley	22 November 1856	
Solicitor General	Sir Henry Singer Keating	28 May 1857	
Judge Advocate General	Charles Pelham Villiers	30 December 1852	continued in office
Lord Advocate	James Moncreiff	30 December 1852	continued in office
Solicitor General for Scotland	Edward Maitland	14 February 1855	
Attorney General for Ireland	Abraham Brewster	April 1853	continued in office
Attorney General for Ireland	William Keogh	March 1855	
Attorney General for Ireland	John Fitzgerald	March 1856	
Solicitor General for Ireland	William Keogh	April 1853	continued in office
Solicitor General for Ireland	John Fitzgerald	March 1855	
Solicitor General for Ireland	Jonathan Christian	March 1856	
Lord Steward of the Household	Frederick Spencer, 4th Earl Spencer	10 January 1854	continued in office
Lord Steward of the Household	Edward Eliot, 3rd Earl of St Germans	23 November 1857	
Lord Chamberlain of the Household	John Campbell, 2nd Marquess of Breadalbane	15 January 1853	continued in office
Vice-Chamberlain of the Household	Lord Ernest Bruce	30 December 1852	continued in office
Master of the Horse	Arthur Wellesley, 2nd Duke of Wellington	21 January 1853	continued in office
Treasurer of the Household	George Phipps, Earl of Mulgrave	4 January 1853	continued in office
Comptroller of the Household	Archibald Douglas, Viscount Drumlanrig	4 January 1853	continued in office
Comptroller of the Household	Valentine Browne, Viscount Castlerosse	25 July 1856	
Captain of the Gentlemen-at-Arms	Thomas Foley, 4th Baron Foley	30 December 1852	continued in office
Captain of the Yeomen of the Guard	John Townshend, 3rd Viscount Sydney	30 December 1852	continued in office
Master of the Buckhounds	John Ponsonby, 5th Earl of Bessborough	30 December 1852	continued in office
Chief Equerry and Clerk Marshal	Lord Alfred Paget	30 December 1852	continued in office
Mistress of the Robes	Harriet Sutherland-Leveson-Gower, Duchess of Sutherland	15 January 1853	continued in office
Lords in Waiting	Charles Somers-Cocks, 3rd Earl Somers	13 January 1853 – 22 February 1857	
Lords in Waiting	Thomas Stonor, 3rd Baron Camoys	13 January 1853 – 21 February 1858	
Lords in Waiting	George Pitt-Rivers, 4th Baron Rivers	13 January 1853 – 21 February 1858	
Lords in Waiting	Henry Cavendish, 3rd Baron Waterpark	13 January 1853 – 21 February 1858	
Lords in Waiting	George Warren, 2nd Baron de Tabley	13 January 1853 – 21 February 1858	
Lords in Waiting	William Hare, 2nd Earl of Listowel	1 October 1853 – 21 February 1856	
Lords in Waiting	Frederick Hamilton-Temple-Blackwood, 5th Baron Dufferin and Clandeboye	28 November 1854 – 21 February 1858	
Lords in Waiting	James Sinclair, 14th Earl of Caithness	15 April 1856 – 21 February 1858	
Lords in Waiting	Richard Dawson, 3rd Baron Cremorne	22 February 1857 – 21 February 1858	

== Notes ==
Preceded by Aberdeen ministry	Government of the United Kingdom; 1855–1858	Succeeded by Second Derby–Disraeli ministry
