= Second Derby–Disraeli ministry =

Conservative government of the United Kingdom between 1858–1859

- 1858–1859
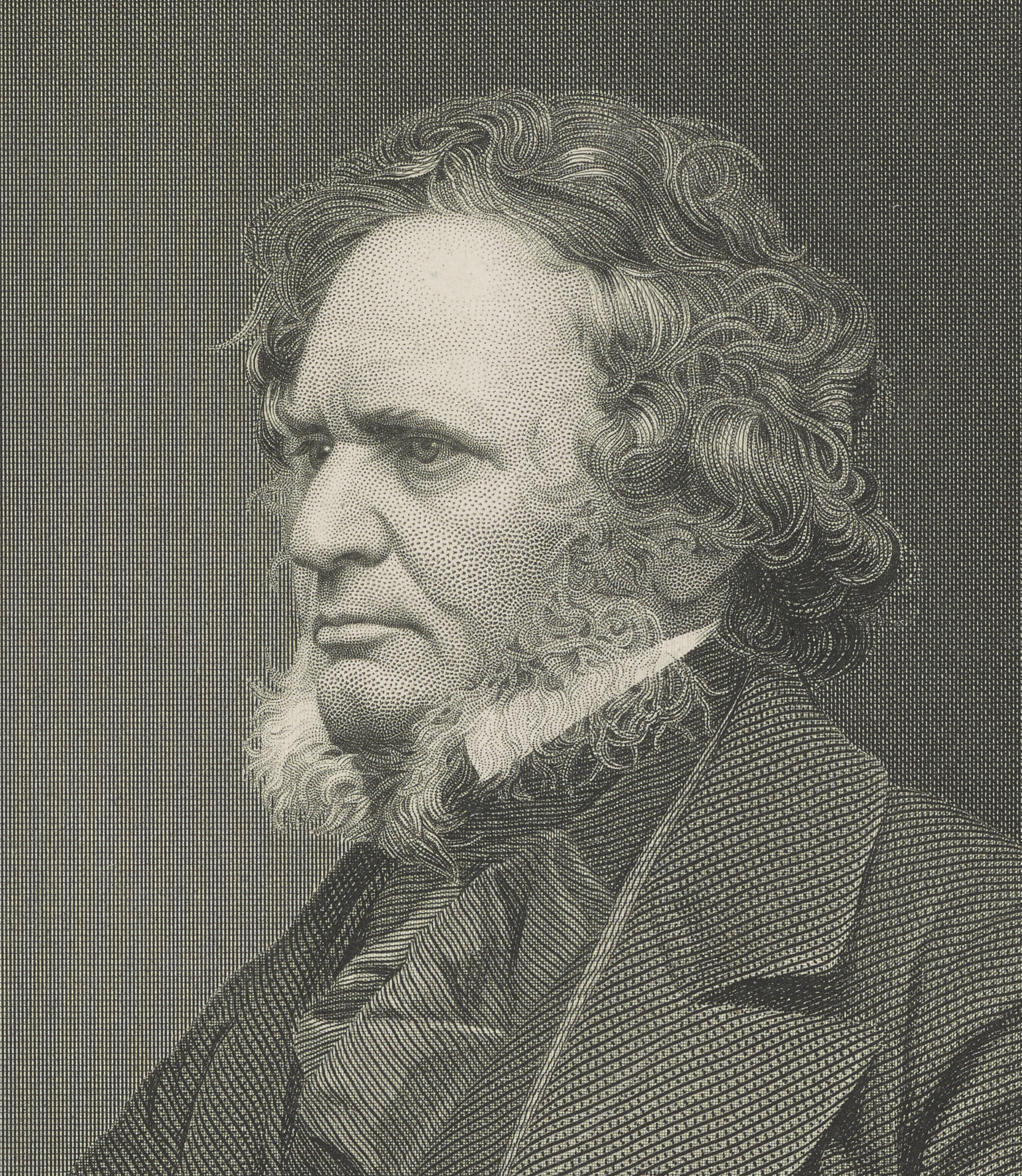
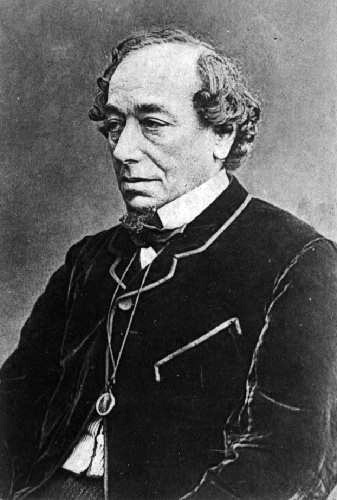
- Date formed: 20 February 1858
- Date dissolved: 11 June 1859

People and organisations
- Monarch: Victoria
- Prime Minister: Edward Smith-Stanley, 14th Earl of Derby
- Chancellor of the Exchequer: Benjamin Disraeli
- Total no. of members: 78 appointments
- Member party: Conservative Party
- Status in legislature: Minority
- Opposition party: Liberal Party
- Opposition leaders: Henry John Temple, 3rd Viscount Palmerston in the House of Commons; Granville Leveson-Gower, 2nd Earl Granville in the House of Lords

History
- Outgoing election: 1859 general election
- Legislature terms: 17th UK Parliament
- Predecessor: First Palmerston ministry
- Successor: Second Palmerston ministry

The Conservative government of the United Kingdom of Great Britain and Ireland that began in 1858 and ended in 1859 was led by Edward Smith-Stanley, 14th Earl of Derby in the House of Lords and Benjamin Disraeli in the House of Commons.

== History ==
After the collapse of Lord Palmerston's first government, the Conservative leader Lord Derby again formed a minority government, with Benjamin Disraeli as Chancellor of the Exchequer. The government oversaw the establishment of Crown rule in India, but was still not strong enough to retain power, falling in June 1859. Lord Palmerston then returned, forming his second ministry.

== Cabinet ==
=== February 1858 – June 1859 ===
Office	Name	Term
First Lord of the Treasury; Leader of the House of Lords	Edward Smith-Stanley, 14th Earl of Derby	February 1858 – June 1859
Lord Chancellor	Frederic Thesiger, 1st Baron Chelmsford	February 1858 – June 1859
Lord President of the Council	James Brownlow William Gascoyne-Cecil, 2nd Marquess of Salisbury	February 1858 – June 1859
Lord Privy Seal	Charles Philip Yorke, 4th Earl of Hardwicke	February 1858 – June 1859
Home Secretary	Spencer Horatio Walpole	February 1858 – March 1859
Home Secretary	T.H.S. Sotheron Estcourt	March–June 1859
Foreign Secretary	James Howard Harris, 3rd Earl of Malmesbury	February 1858 – June 1859
Secretary of State for the Colonies	Lord Stanley	February–June 1858
Secretary of State for the Colonies	Sir Edward Bulwer-Lytton	June 1858 – June 1859
Secretary of State for War	General Jonathan Peel	February 1858 – June 1859
Secretary of State for India	Lord Stanley	September 1858 – June 1859
First Lord of the Admiralty	Sir John Pakington, Bt	February 1858 – June 1859
President of the Board of Control	Edward Law, 1st Earl of Ellenborough	February–June 1858
President of the Board of Control	Lord Stanley	June–September 1858
	replaced by the India Office	
Chancellor of the Exchequer; Leader of the House of Commons	Benjamin Disraeli	February 1858 – June 1859
President of the Board of Trade	J.W. Henley	February 1858 – June 1859
First Commissioner of Works	Lord John Manners	February 1858 – June 1859

== List of ministers ==
Cabinet members are listed in bold face.

Office	Name	Date
Prime Minister First Lord of the Treasury Leader of the House of Lords	**Edward Smith-Stanley, 14th Earl of Derby**	21 February 1858 – 11 June 1859
Chancellor of the Exchequer Leader of the House of Commons	**Benjamin Disraeli**	26 February 1858
Parliamentary Secretary to the Treasury	Sir William Jolliffe	2 March 1858
Financial Secretary to the Treasury	George Alexander Hamilton	2 March 1858
Financial Secretary to the Treasury	Sir Stafford Northcote	21 January 1859
Junior Lords of the Treasury	Lord Henry Lennox	1 March 1858 – 14 March 1859
Junior Lords of the Treasury	Thomas Edward Taylor	1 March 1858 – 11 June 1859
Junior Lords of the Treasury	Henry Whitmore	1 March 1858 – 11 June 1859
Junior Lords of the Treasury	Peter Blackburn	15 March 1859 – 11 June 1859
Lord Chancellor	**Frederic Thesiger, 1st Baron Chelmsford**	26 February 1858
Lord President of the Council	**James Gascoyne-Cecil, 2nd Marquess of Salisbury**	26 February 1858
Lord Privy Seal	**Charles Philip Yorke, 4th Earl of Hardwicke**	26 February 1858
Secretary of State for the Home Department	**Spencer Horatio Walpole**	26 February 1858
Secretary of State for the Home Department	**Thomas H. Sotheron-Estcourt**	3 March 1859
Under-Secretary of State for the Home Department	Gathorne Hardy	26 February 1858
Secretary of State for Foreign Affairs	**James Howard Harris, 3rd Earl of Malmesbury**	26 February 1858
Parliamentary Under-Secretary of State for Foreign Affairs	William Robert Seymour Vesey Fitzgerald	26 February 1858
Secretary of State for War	**Jonathan Peel**	26 February 1858
Under-Secretary of State for War	Charles Hardinge, 2nd Viscount Hardinge	8 March 1858
Under-Secretary of State for War	James St Clair-Erskine, 3rd Earl of Rosslyn	3 March 1859
Surveyor-General of the Ordnance	vacant	—
Secretary of State for the Colonies	**Lord Stanley**	26 February 1858
Secretary of State for the Colonies	**Sir Edward Bulwer-Lytton**	5 June 1858
Under-Secretary of State for the Colonies	Henry Herbert, 4th Earl of Carnarvon	26 February 1858
Secretary of State for India	**Lord Stanley**	2 September 1858
Under-Secretary of State for India	Henry James Baillie	30 September 1858
First Lord of the Admiralty	**Sir John Pakington**	8 March 1858
First Secretary of the Admiralty	Henry Thomas Lowry Corry	9 March 1858
Civil Lord of the Admiralty	Lord Lovaine	8 March 1858
Civil Lord of the Admiralty	Frederick Lygon	9 March 1859
President of the Board of Control	**Edward Law, 1st Earl of Ellenborough**	6 March 1858
President of the Board of Control	**Lord Stanley** (Note: Board of Control abolished 2 August 1858.)	5 June 1858
Joint Secretary to the Board of Control	Henry James Baillie	6 March 1858
President of the Board of Trade	**Joseph Warner Henley**	26 February 1858
President of the Board of Trade	Richard John Hely-Hutchinson, 4th Earl of Donoughmore	3 March 1859
Vice-President of the Board of Trade	Richard John Hely-Hutchinson, 4th Earl of Donoughmore	6 April 1858
Vice-President of the Board of Trade	Lord Lovaine	3 March 1859
First Commissioner of Works	**Lord John Manners**	26 February 1858
Vice-President of the Committee on Education	Charles Bowyer Adderley	12 March 1858
President of the Board of Health	Charles Bowyer Adderley	8 March 1858 (Note: Office abolished in 1858.)
Chief Secretary for Ireland	Lord Naas	4 March 1858
Lord Lieutenant of Ireland	Archibald William Montgomerie, 13th Earl of Eglinton	8 March 1858
Chancellor of the Duchy of Lancaster	James Graham, 4th Duke of Montrose	26 February 1858
Paymaster General	Richard John Hely-Hutchinson, 4th Earl of Donoughmore	6 April 1858
Paymaster General	Lord Lovaine	3 March 1859
President of the Poor Law Board	T.H.S. Sotheron Estcourt	6 March 1858
President of the Poor Law Board	Earl of March	7 March 1859
Parliamentary Secretary to the Poor Law Board	Frederick Winn Knight	12 March 1858
Postmaster-General	Charles Edward Abbott, 2nd Baron Colchester	13 March 1858
Attorney General	Sir Fitzroy Kelly	26 February 1858
Solicitor General	Sir Hugh Cairns	26 February 1858
Judge Advocate General	John Mowbray	13 March 1858
Lord Advocate	John Inglis	1 March 1858
Lord Advocate	Charles Baillie	10 July 1858
Lord Advocate	David Mure	15 April 1859
Solicitor General for Scotland	Charles Baillie	17 March 1858
Solicitor General for Scotland	David Mure	12 July 1858
Solicitor General for Scotland	George Patton	3 May 1859
Attorney General for Ireland	James Whiteside	February 1858
Solicitor General for Ireland	Henry George Hughes	February 1858
Solicitor General for Ireland	Edmund Hayes	1859
Lord Steward of the Household	Brownlow Cecil, 2nd Marquess of Exeter	26 February 1858
Lord Chamberlain of the Household	George John Sackville-West, 5th Earl De La Warr	26 February 1858
Master of the Horse	Henry Charles Fitzroy Somerset, 8th Duke of Beaufort	26 February 1858
Treasurer of the Household	Lord Claud Hamilton	26 February 1858
Comptroller of the Household	George Weld-Forester	26 February 1858
Captain of the Gentlemen-at-Arms	Henry John Chetwynd-Talbot, 18th Earl of Shrewsbury	26 February 1858
Captain of the Yeomen of the Guard	William Lennox Lascelles FitzGerald-de Ros, 23rd Baron de Ros	17 March 1858
Master of the Buckhounds	John William Montagu, 7th Earl of Sandwich	26 February 1858
Chief Equerry and Clerk Marshal	Charles Colville, 1st Viscount Colville of Culross	26 February 1858
Mistress of the Robes	The Duchess of Manchester	26 February 1858
Lords in Waiting	James Grimston, 2nd Earl of Verulam	26 February 1858 – 11 June 1859
Lords in Waiting	George Holroyd, 2nd Earl of Sheffield	26 February 1858 – 11 June 1859
Lords in Waiting	William Drummond, 7th Viscount Strathallan	26 February 1858 – 11 June 1859
Lords in Waiting	Henry Hepburne-Scott, 7th Lord Polwarth	26 February 1858 – 11 June 1859
Lords in Waiting	Edward Crofton, 2nd Baron Crofton	26 February 1858 – 11 June 1859
Lords in Waiting	William Bateman-Hanbury, 2nd Baron Bateman	26 February 1858 – 11 June 1859
Lords in Waiting	Richard Somerset, 2nd Baron Raglan	26 February 1858 – 11 June 1859

Notes

Preceded by First Palmerston ministry	Government of the United Kingdom; 1858–1859	Succeeded by Second Palmerston ministry
