= Russell ministry =

Russell ministry may refer to:

- First Russell ministry, the British government led by Lord John Russell from 1846 to 1852
- Second Russell ministry, the British government led by Lord Russell from 1865 to 1866
