= Aberdeen ministry =

Government of the United Kingdom

- 1852–1855
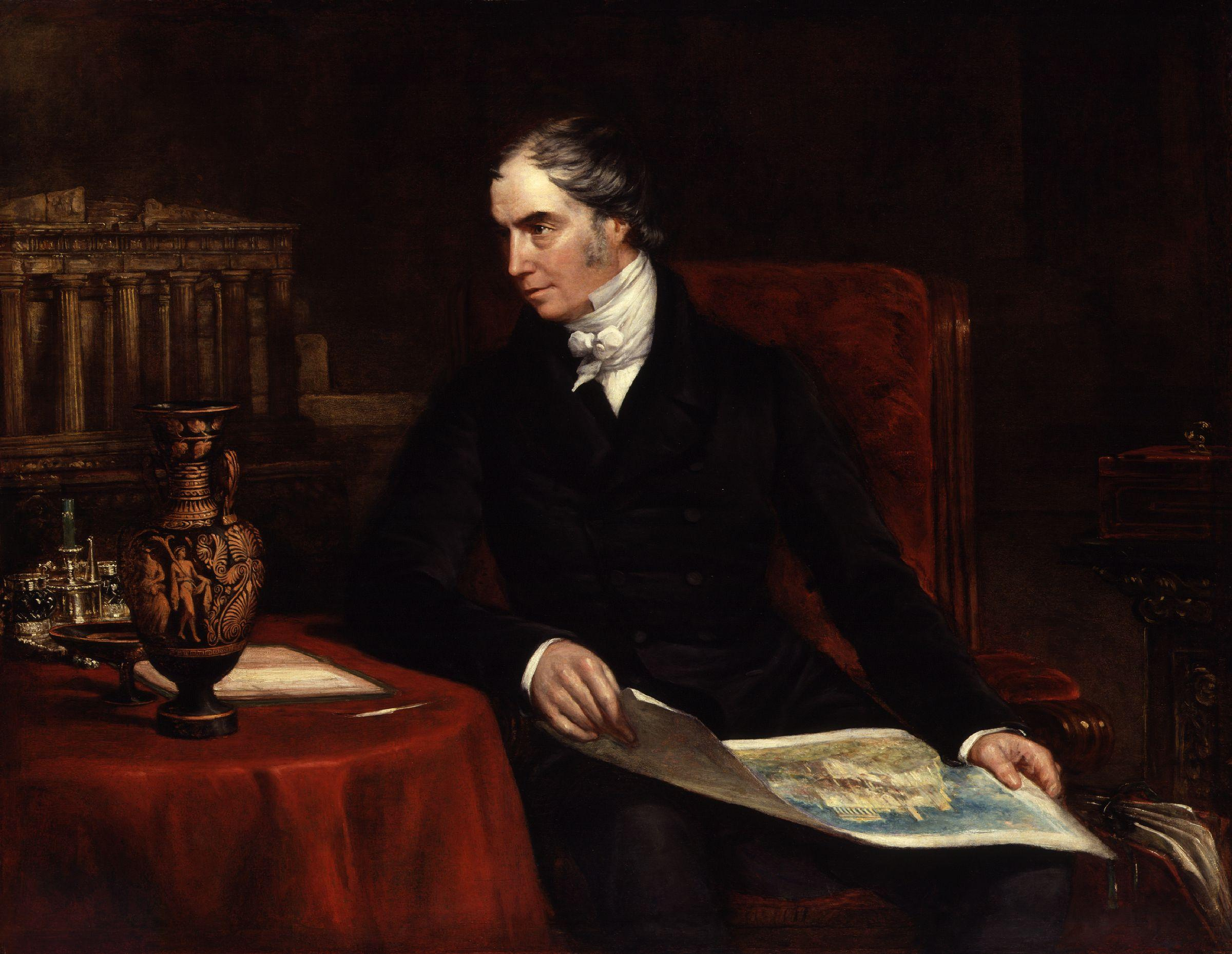
- Aberdeen (circa 1847)
- Date formed: 19 December 1852
- Date dissolved: 30 January 1855

People and organisations
- Monarch: Queen Victoria
- Prime Minister: George Hamilton-Gordon, 4th Earl of Aberdeen
- Member parties: Peelites; Whigs
- Opposition party: Conservative Party
- Opposition leaders: Benjamin Disraeli in the House of Commons; The Earl of Derby in the House of Lords

History
- Predecessor: Who? Who? ministry
- Successor: First Palmerston ministry

After the collapse of Lord Derby's minority government, the Whigs and Peelites formed a coalition under the Peelite leader George Hamilton-Gordon, 4th Earl of Aberdeen. The government resigned in early 1855 after a large parliamentary majority voted for a select committee to enquire into the incompetent management of the Crimean War. The former Home Secretary, Lord Palmerston, then formed his first government.

== Cabinet ==
=== December 1852 – February 1855 ===
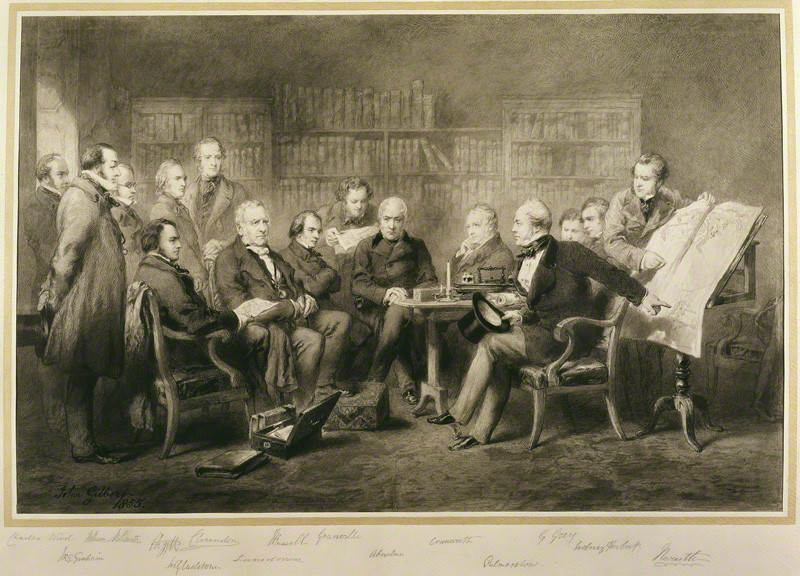
The Coalition Ministry of 1854 as painted by Sir John Gilbert (1855)

Cabinet members
Portfolio	Minister	Took office	Left office	Party
First Lord of the Treasury; Leader of the House of Lords	George Hamilton-Gordon, 4th Earl of Aberdeen (head of ministry)	19 December 1852	30 January 1855	Peelite
Lord Chancellor	Robert Rolfe, 1st Baron Cranworth	28 December 1852	21 February 1858	Whig
Lord President of the Council	Granville Leveson-Gower, 2nd Earl Granville	28 December 1852	12 June 1854	Whig
Lord President of the Council	Lord John Russell	12 June 1854	8 February 1855	Whig
Lord Privy Seal	George Douglas Campbell, 8th Duke of Argyll	4 January 1853	7 December 1855	Peelite
Secretary of State for the Home Department	Henry Temple, 3rd Viscount Palmerston	28 December 1852	6 February 1855	Whig
Secretary of State for Foreign Affairs	Lord John Russell	28 December 1852	12 February 1853	Whig
Secretary of State for Foreign Affairs	George Villiers, 4th Earl of Clarendon	21 February 1853	26 February 1858	Whig
Secretary of State for the Colonies	Sir George Grey, 2nd Baronet	12 June 1854	8 February 1855	Whig
Secretary of State for War and the Colonies†	Henry Pelham-Clinton, 5th Duke of Newcastle	28 December 1852	30 January 1855	Peelite
Chancellor of the Exchequer	William Ewart Gladstone	28 December 1852	28 February 1855	Peelite
First Lord of the Admiralty	Sir James Graham, 2nd Baronet	30 December 1852	13 March 1855	Peelite
President of the Board of Control	Sir Charles Wood	30 December 1852	3 March 1855	Whig
Chancellor of the Duchy of Lancaster	Granville Leveson-Gower, 2nd Earl Granville	21 June 1854	30 January 1855	Whig
First Commissioner of Works	Sir William Molesworth, 8th Baronet	5 January 1853	30 January 1855	Radical
Secretary at War	Sidney Herbert	30 December 1852	28 February 1855	Peelite
Minister without portfolio	Henry Petty-FitzMaurice, 3rd Marquess of Lansdowne	28 December 1852	21 February 1858	Whig
Minister without portfolio	Lord John Russell	26 February 1853	8 June 1854	Whig

† After June 1854 office became Secretary of State for War.

==== Notes ====
- Lord John Russell served as Leader of the House of Commons from December 1852 to February 1855.

==== Changes ====
- February 1853: Lord John Russell becomes Minister without Portfolio, remaining Leader of the Commons. Lord Clarendon succeeds him as Foreign Secretary.
- June 1854: Lord Granville becomes Chancellor of the Duchy of Lancaster. Lord John Russell succeeds him as Lord President, remaining also Leader of the Commons. The Secretaryship of State for War and the Colonies is split up. The Duke of Newcastle stays on as Secretary of State for War, while Sir George Grey becomes Secretary of State for the Colonies.

== List of ministers ==
Members of the Cabinet are indicated by bold face.

Office	Name	Party	Date	Notes
Prime Minister, First Lord of the Treasury and Leader of the House of Lords	George Hamilton-Gordon, 4th Earl of Aberdeen	Peelite	19 December 1852 – 30 January 1855	
Chancellor of the Exchequer	William Ewart Gladstone	Peelite	30 December 1852	
Parliamentary Secretary to the Treasury	William Goodenough Hayter	Whig	5 January 1853	
Financial Secretary to the Treasury	James Wilson	Whig	5 January 1853	
Junior Lords of the Treasury	Lord Alfred Hervey	Peelite	1 January 1853 – 7 March 1855	
Junior Lords of the Treasury	Francis Charteris, Lord Elcho	Whig	1 January 1853 – 7 March 1855	
Junior Lords of the Treasury	John Sadleir	Independent Irish Party	1 January 1853 – 6 March 1854	
Junior Lords of the Treasury	Chichester Fortescue	Whig	6 March 1854 – 16 April 1855	
Lord Chancellor	Robert Rolfe, 1st Baron Cranworth	Whig	28 December 1852	
Lord President of the Council	Granville Leveson-Gower, 2nd Earl Granville	Whig	28 December 1852	
Lord President of the Council	Lord John Russell	Whig	12 June 1854	also Leader of the House of Commons
Lord Privy Seal	George Campbell, 8th Duke of Argyll	Peelite	4 January 1853	
Secretary of State for the Home Department	Henry John Temple, 3rd Viscount Palmerston	Whig	28 December 1852	
Under-Secretary of State for the Home Department	Henry Fitzroy	Peelite	28 December 1852	
Secretary of State for Foreign Affairs	Lord John Russell	Whig	28 December 1852	also Leader of the House of Commons
Secretary of State for Foreign Affairs	George Villiers, 4th Earl of Clarendon	Whig	21 February 1853	
Under-Secretary of State for Foreign Affairs	John Wodehouse, 3rd Baron Wodehouse	Whig	28 December 1852	
Secretary of State for War and the Colonies	Henry Pelham-Clinton, 5th Duke of Newcastle	Peelite	28 December 1852	department abolished 10 June 1854
Under-Secretary of State for War and the Colonies	Frederick Peel	Peelite	28 December 1852	department abolished 10 June 1854
Secretary of State for War	Henry Pelham-Clinton, 5th Duke of Newcastle	Peelite	12 June 1854	
Under-Secretary of State for War	Henry Roberts		12 June 1854	
Secretary of State for the Colonies	Sir George Grey, 2nd Baronet	Whig	12 June 1854	
Under-Secretary of State for the Colonies	Frederick Peel	Whig	12 June 1854	
First Lord of the Admiralty	Sir James Graham, 2nd Baronet	Peelite	30 December 1852	
First Secretary of the Admiralty	Ralph Bernal Osborne	Whig	6 January 1853	
Civil Lord of the Admiralty	William Francis Cowper	Whig	30 December 1852	
President of the Board of Control	Sir Charles Wood, 3rd Baronet	Whig	30 December 1852	
Joint Secretaries to the Board of Control	Robert Lowe	Whig	30 December 1852	
Joint Secretaries to the Board of Control	Sir Thomas Redington	Whig	30 December 1852	(permanent)
Chancellor of the Duchy of Lancaster	Edward Strutt	Radical	3 January 1853	
Chancellor of the Duchy of Lancaster	Granville George Leveson-Gower, 2nd Earl Granville	Whig	21 June 1854	
Minister without Portfolio	Henry Petty-FitzMaurice, 3rd Marquess of Lansdowne	Whig	28 December 1852 – 21 February 1858	
Minister without Portfolio	Lord John Russell	Whig	26 February 1853 – 8 June 1854	also Leader of the House of Commons
Secretary at War	Sidney Herbert	Peelite	30 December 1852	
First Commissioner of Works	Sir William Molesworth, 8th Baronet	Radical	5 January 1853	
President of the Board of Health	Sir Benjamin Hall, 1st Baronet	Whig	14 January 1854	
Chief Secretary for Ireland	Sir John Young, 2nd Baronet	Peelite	6 January 1853	
Lord Lieutenant of Ireland	Edward Eliot, 3rd Earl of St Germans	Peelite	5 January 1853	
Master-General of the Ordnance	Fitzroy Somerset, 1st Baron Raglan	non-party	30 September 1852	continued in office
Lieutenant-General of the Ordnance	Sir Hew Dalrymple Ross	non-party	6 May 1854	
Surveyor-General of the Ordnance	Lauderdale Maule	Whig	5 January 1853	died 1 August 1854
Clerk of the Ordnance	William Monsell	Whig	13 January 1853	
Storekeeper of the Ordnance	Sir Thomas Hastings	non-party	25 July 1845	continued in office
Paymaster General	Edward John Stanley, 2nd Baron Stanley of Alderley	Whig	5 January 1853	
Postmaster-General	Charles Canning, 2nd Viscount Canning	Peelite	5 January 1853	
President of the Poor Law Board	Matthew Talbot Baines	Whig	30 December 1852	
Parliamentary Secretary to the Poor Law Board	Grenville Berkeley	Whig	7 January 1853	
President of the Board of Trade	Edward Cardwell	Peelite	28 December 1852	
Vice-President of the Board of Trade	Edward Stanley, 2nd Baron Stanley of Alderley	Whig	4 January 1853	
Attorney General	Sir Alexander Cockburn, 12th Baronet	Whig	28 December 1852	
Solicitor General	Sir Richard Bethell	Whig	28 December 1852	
Judge Advocate General	Charles Pelham Villiers	Whig	30 December 1852	
Lord Advocate	James Moncreiff	Whig	30 December 1852	
Solicitor General for Scotland	Robert Handyside		17 January 1853	
Solicitor General for Scotland	James Craufurd		16 November 1853	
Solicitor General for Scotland	Thomas Mackenzie		11 January 1855	
Attorney General for Ireland	Abraham Brewster	Peelite	April 1853	
Solicitor General for Ireland	William Keogh	Independent Irish Party	April 1853	
Lord Steward of the Household	Henry Charles Fitzalan-Howard, 13th Duke of Norfolk	Whig	4 January 1853	
Lord Steward of the Household	Frederick Spencer, 4th Earl Spencer	Whig	10 January 1854	
Lord Chamberlain of the Household	John Campbell, 2nd Marquess of Breadalbane	Whig	15 January 1853	
Vice-Chamberlain of the Household	Lord Ernest Bruce	Peelite	30 December 1852	
Master of the Horse	Arthur Wellesley, 2nd Duke of Wellington	Conservative	21 January 1853	
Treasurer of the Household	George Phipps, Earl of Mulgrave	Whig	4 January 1853	
Comptroller of the Household	Archibald Douglas, Viscount Drumlanrig	Conservative	4 January 1853	
Captain of the Gentlemen-at-Arms	Thomas Foley, 4th Baron Foley	Whig	30 December 1852	
Captain of the Yeomen of the Guard	John Townshend, 3rd Viscount Sydney	Whig;	30 December 1852	
Master of the Buckhounds	John Ponsonby, 5th Earl of Bessborough	Whig	30 December 1852	
Chief Equerry and Clerk Marshal	Lord Alfred Paget	Whig	30 December 1852	
Mistress of the Robes	Harriet Sutherland-Leveson-Gower, Duchess of Sutherland	Whig	15 January 1853	
Lords in Waiting	John Butler, 2nd Marquess of Ormonde	Whig	11 January 1853 – 25 September 1854	
Lords in Waiting	Charles Somers-Cocks, 3rd Earl Somers	Peelite	13 January 1853 – 22 February 1857	
Lords in Waiting	Thomas Stonor, 3rd Baron Camoys	Whig	13 January 1853 – 21 February 1858	
Lords in Waiting	John Elphinstone, 13th Lord Elphinstone	Whig	13 January 1853 – 1 October 1853	
Lords in Waiting	George Pitt-Rivers, 4th Baron Rivers	Peelite	13 January 1853 – 21 February 1858	
Lords in Waiting	Henry Cavendish, 3rd Baron Waterpark	Whig	13 January 1853 – 21 February 1858	
Lords in Waiting	George Warren, 2nd Baron de Tabley	Whig	13 January 1853 – 21 February 1858	
Lords in Waiting	William Hare, 2nd Earl of Listowel	Whig	1 October 1853 – 21 February 1856	
Lords in Waiting	Frederick Hamilton-Temple-Blackwood, 5th Baron Dufferin and Clandeboye	Whig	28 November 1854 – 21 February 1858	

Preceded by Who? Who? ministry	Government of the United Kingdom; 1852–1855	Succeeded by First Palmerston ministry
