= Foreign Secretary (United Kingdom) =

Member of the Cabinet of the United Kingdom

United Kingdom Secretary of State for Foreign, Commonwealth and Development Affairs
- Royal Arms of His Majesty's Government

- Incumbent; Ed Miliband since 20 July 2026
- Foreign, Commonwealth and Development Office
- Style: Foreign Secretary (informal); The Right Honourable (within the UK and Commonwealth); His Excellency (diplomatic)
- Type: Minister of the Crown
- Status: Secretary of State; Great Office of State
- Member of: Cabinet; Privy Council; National Security Council
- Reports to: The Prime Minister
- Residence: No. 1 Carlton Gardens (official); Chevening (country house)
- Nominator: The Prime Minister
- Appointer: The Monarch; (on the advice of the Prime Minister)
- Term length: At His Majesty's pleasure
- Formation: 27 March 1782 (as Secretary of State for Foreign Affairs); 2 September 2020 (as Secretary of State for Foreign, Commonwealth and Development Affairs)
- First holder: Charles James Fox (as Secretary of State for Foreign Affairs)
- Deputy: Minister of State for Development
- Salary: £106,363 per annum (2022)
- Website: gov.uk/government/ministers/secretary-of-state-for-foreign-commonwealth-and-development-affairs

The secretary of state for foreign, Commonwealth and development affairs, commonly known as the foreign secretary, is a secretary of state in the Government of the United Kingdom, with responsibility for the Foreign, Commonwealth and Development Office. The role is one of the most senior ministers in the UK Government and is a Great Office of State. The incumbent is a member of the Cabinet of the United Kingdom and National Security Council, and reports directly to the prime minister.

The officeholder works alongside the other Foreign Office ministers. The corresponding shadow minister is the shadow foreign secretary. The Foreign Affairs Select Committee also evaluates the secretary of state's performance.

The current foreign secretary is Ed Miliband. He was appointed by Prime Minister Andy Burnham on 20 July 2026.

== Responsibilities ==
The foreign secretary is responsible for overseeing the United Kingdom's foreign policy and international relations. The role broadly corresponds to that of a foreign minister in many other countries, while also encompassing additional responsibilities.

The foreign secretary's remit includes:

- Conducting relations with foreign states and international organisations
- Promoting British interests abroad
- Overseeing matters pertaining to the Commonwealth of Nations and the British Overseas Territories
- Responsibility for the activities of the Secret Intelligence Service (MI6) and the Government Communications Headquarters (GCHQ), including ministerial authorisation of certain intelligence operations

== Residence ==
The official residence of the foreign secretary is 1 Carlton Gardens in London. The foreign secretary also has the use of Chevening House, a country house in Kent.

== History ==
History of English and British government departments with responsibility for foreign affairs and those with responsibility for the colonies, dominions and the Commonwealth
Northern Department; 1660–1782; Secretaries — Undersecretaries	Southern Department; 1660–1768; Secretaries — Undersecretaries		—
Northern Department; 1660–1782; Secretaries — Undersecretaries	Southern Department; 1768–1782; Secretaries — Undersecretaries; 1782: diplomatic responsibilities transferred to new Foreign Office	Colonial Office; 1768–1782; Secretaries — Undersecretaries	—
Foreign Office; 1782–1968; Secretaries — Ministers — Undersecretaries	Home Office; 1782–1794; Secretaries — Undersecretaries		—
Foreign Office; 1782–1968; Secretaries — Ministers — Undersecretaries	War Office; 1794–1801; Secretaries — Undersecretaries		—
Foreign Office; 1782–1968; Secretaries — Ministers — Undersecretaries	War and Colonial Office; 1801–1854; Secretaries — Undersecretaries		—
Foreign Office; 1782–1968; Secretaries — Ministers — Undersecretaries	Colonial Office; 1854–1925; Secretaries — Undersecretaries		India Office; 1858–1937; Secretaries — Undersecretaries
Foreign Office; 1782–1968; Secretaries — Ministers — Undersecretaries	Colonial Office; 1925–1966; Secretaries — Ministers — Undersecretaries	Dominions Office; 1925–1947; Secretaries — Undersecretaries	India Office; 1858–1937; Secretaries — Undersecretaries
Foreign Office; 1782–1968; Secretaries — Ministers — Undersecretaries	Colonial Office; 1925–1966; Secretaries — Ministers — Undersecretaries	Dominions Office; 1925–1947; Secretaries — Undersecretaries	India Office and Burma Office; 1937–1947; Secretaries — Undersecretaries
Foreign Office; 1782–1968; Secretaries — Ministers — Undersecretaries	Colonial Office; 1925–1966; Secretaries — Ministers — Undersecretaries	Commonwealth Relations Office; 1947–1966; Secretaries — Ministers — Undersecretaries	
Foreign Office; 1782–1968; Secretaries — Ministers — Undersecretaries	Commonwealth Office; 1966–1968; Secretaries — Ministers — Undersecretaries		
Foreign and Commonwealth Office; 1968–2020; Secretaries — Ministers — Undersecretaries			Department for International Development; 1997–2020; Secretaries
Foreign, Commonwealth and Development Office; Since 2020; Secretaries — Ministers — Undersecretaries

The title of secretary of state in the government of England dates back to the early 17th century. The position of secretary of state for foreign affairs was created in the British governmental reorganisation of 1782, in which the Northern Department and Southern Department became the Foreign Office and Home Office respectively. The India Office was closed down in 1947. It had been a constituent predecessor department of the Foreign Office, like the Colonial Office and the Dominions Office.

The position of secretary of state for foreign and Commonwealth affairs came into existence in 1968 with the merger of the functions of secretary of state for foreign affairs and the secretary of state for Commonwealth affairs into a single department of state. Margaret Beckett, appointed in 2006 by Tony Blair, was the first woman to hold the post.

The post of secretary of state for foreign, Commonwealth and development affairs was created in 2020 when position holder Dominic Raab absorbed the responsibilities of the secretary of state for international development. The position was incorporated as a corporation sole later that year.

The deputy secretary of state for foreign, Commonwealth and development affairs, also known as the deputy foreign secretary, was a minister of state position from 2023 to 2024, with responsibility to represent the foreign secretary in the House of Commons. It was created due to prime minister Rishi Sunak appointing former prime minister David Cameron a life peer in November 2023 to serve as foreign secretary from the House of Lords. Andrew Mitchell was the only holder of the office.

== List of foreign secretaries ==
=== Secretaries of state for foreign affairs (1782–1968) ===
Secretary of State for Foreign Affairs
Portrait	Name (Note: Including honorifics and constituencies for elected MPs.)	Term of office		Party	Ministry	Monarch (Reign)
	Charles James Fox; MP for Westminster	27 March 1782	5 July 1782	Whig	Rockingham II	George III (1760–1820) (Note: The Prince of Wales served as prince regent from 5 February 1811.)
	Thomas Robinson; 2nd Baron Grantham	13 July 1782	2 April 1783	Whig	Shelburne (Whig–Tory)	George III (1760–1820)
	Charles James Fox; MP for Westminster	2 April 1783	19 December 1783	Whig	Fox–North	George III (1760–1820)
	George Nugent-Temple-Grenville; 3rd Earl Temple	19 December 1783	23 December 1783	Tory	Pitt I	George III (1760–1820)
	His Grace; Francis Osborne; 5th Duke of Leeds	23 December 1783	May 1791	Tory	Pitt I	George III (1760–1820)
	William Grenville; 1st Baron Grenville	8 June 1791	20 February 1801	Tory	Pitt I	George III (1760–1820)
	Robert Jenkinson; 2nd Baron Hawkesbury; MP for Rye (Note: Elevated to the Peerage of the United Kingdom in November 1803.)	20 February 1801	14 May 1804	Tory	Pitt I	George III (1760–1820)
	Robert Jenkinson; 2nd Baron Hawkesbury; MP for Rye	20 February 1801	14 May 1804	Tory	Addington	George III (1760–1820)
	Dudley Ryder; 2nd Baron Harrowby	14 May 1804	11 January 1805	Tory	Pitt II	George III (1760–1820)
	Henry Phipps; 3rd Baron Mulgrave	11 January 1805	7 February 1806	Tory	Pitt II	George III (1760–1820)
	Charles James Fox; MP for Westminster	7 February 1806	13 September 1806^{†}	Whig	All the Talents (Whig–Tory)	George III (1760–1820)
	Charles Grey; Viscount Howick; MP for Northumberland	24 September 1806	25 March 1807	Whig	All the Talents (Whig–Tory)	George III (1760–1820)
	George Canning MP for Newtown (Isle of Wight) → Hastings (Note: Elected to a new constituency in the 1807 general election.)	25 March 1807	11 October 1809	Tory	Portland II	George III (1760–1820)
	Henry Bathurst; 3rd Earl Bathurst	11 October 1809	6 December 1809	Tory	Perceval	George III (1760–1820)
	Richard Wellesley; 1st Marquess Wellesley	6 December 1809	4 March 1812	Independent	Perceval	George III (1760–1820)
	Robert Stewart; 2nd Marquess of Londonderry MP for 3 constituencies respectively	4 March 1812	12 August 1822^{†}	Tory	Liverpool	George III (1760–1820)
	Robert Stewart; 2nd Marquess of Londonderry MP for 3 constituencies respectively	4 March 1812	12 August 1822^{†}	Tory	Liverpool	George IV
	George Canning; MP for 3 constituencies respectively	16 September 1822	30 April 1827	Tory	Liverpool	George IV
	John Ward; 1st Earl of Dudley	30 April 1827	2 June 1828	Tory	Canning (Canningite–Whig)	George IV
	John Ward; 1st Earl of Dudley	30 April 1827	2 June 1828	Tory	Goderich	George IV
	John Ward; 1st Earl of Dudley	30 April 1827	2 June 1828	Tory	Wellington–Peel	George IV
	George Hamilton-Gordon; 4th Earl of Aberdeen	2 June 1828	22 November 1830	Tory	Wellington–Peel	George IV
	George Hamilton-Gordon; 4th Earl of Aberdeen	2 June 1828	22 November 1830	Tory	Wellington–Peel	William IV
	Henry John Temple; 3rd Viscount Palmerston; MP for 3 constituencies respectively	22 November 1830	14 November 1834	Whig	Grey	William IV
	Henry John Temple; 3rd Viscount Palmerston; MP for 3 constituencies respectively	22 November 1830	14 November 1834	Whig	Melbourne I	William IV
	Arthur Wellesley; 1st Duke of Wellington	14 November 1834	18 April 1835	Tory	Wellington Caretaker	William IV
	Arthur Wellesley; 1st Duke of Wellington	14 November 1834	18 April 1835	Conservative	Peel I	William IV
	Henry John Temple; 3rd Viscount Palmerston; MP for Tiverton	18 April 1835	2 September 1841	Whig	Melbourne II	William IV
	Henry John Temple; 3rd Viscount Palmerston; MP for Tiverton	18 April 1835	2 September 1841	Whig	Melbourne II	Victoria (1837–1901)
	George Hamilton-Gordon; 4th Earl of Aberdeen	2 September 1841	6 July 1846	Conservative	Peel II	Victoria (1837–1901)
	Henry John Temple; 3rd Viscount Palmerston; MP for Tiverton	6 July 1846	26 December 1851	Whig	Russell I	Victoria (1837–1901)
	Granville Leveson-Gower; 2nd Earl Granville	26 December 1851	27 February 1852	Whig	Russell I	Victoria (1837–1901)
	James Howard Harris; 3rd Earl of Malmesbury	27 February 1852	28 December 1852	Conservative	Who? Who?	Victoria (1837–1901)
	Lord John Russell; MP for the City of London	28 December 1852	21 February 1853	Whig	Aberdeen (Peelite–Whig)	Victoria (1837–1901)
	George Villiers; 4th Earl of Clarendon	21 February 1853	26 February 1858	Whig	Aberdeen (Peelite–Whig)	Victoria (1837–1901)
	George Villiers; 4th Earl of Clarendon	21 February 1853	26 February 1858	Whig	Palmerston I	Victoria (1837–1901)
	James Howard Harris; 3rd Earl of Malmesbury	26 February 1858	18 June 1859	Conservative	Derby–Disraeli II	Victoria (1837–1901)
	John Russell; 1st Earl Russell	18 June 1859	3 November 1865	Liberal	Palmerston II	Victoria (1837–1901)
	George Villiers; 4th Earl of Clarendon	3 November 1865	6 July 1866	Liberal	Russell II	Victoria (1837–1901)
	Edward Stanley; Lord Stanley; MP for King's Lynn	6 July 1866	9 December 1868	Conservative	Derby–Disraeli III	Victoria (1837–1901)
	George Villiers; 4th Earl of Clarendon	9 December 1868	6 July 1870	Liberal	Gladstone I	Victoria (1837–1901)
	Granville Leveson-Gower; 2nd Earl Granville	6 July 1870	21 February 1874	Liberal	Gladstone I	Victoria (1837–1901)
	Edward Stanley; 15th Earl of Derby	21 February 1874	2 April 1878	Conservative	Disraeli II	Victoria (1837–1901)
	Robert Gascoyne-Cecil; 3rd Marquess of Salisbury	2 April 1878	28 April 1880	Conservative	Disraeli II	Victoria (1837–1901)
	Granville Leveson-Gower; 2nd Earl Granville	28 April 1880	24 June 1885	Liberal	Gladstone II	Victoria (1837–1901)
	Robert Gascoyne-Cecil; 3rd Marquess of Salisbury	24 June 1885	6 February 1886	Conservative	Salisbury I	Victoria (1837–1901)
	Archibald Primrose; 5th Earl of Rosebery	6 February 1886	3 August 1886	Liberal	Gladstone III	Victoria (1837–1901)
	Stafford Northcote; 1st Earl of Iddesleigh	3 August 1886	12 January 1887^{†}	Conservative	Salisbury II	Victoria (1837–1901)
	Robert Gascoyne-Cecil; 3rd Marquess of Salisbury	14 January 1887	11 August 1892	Conservative	Salisbury II	Victoria (1837–1901)
	Archibald Primrose; 5th Earl of Rosebery	18 August 1892	11 March 1894	Liberal	Gladstone IV	Victoria (1837–1901)
	John Wodehouse; 1st Earl of Kimberley	11 March 1894	21 June 1895	Liberal	Rosebery	Victoria (1837–1901)
	Robert Gascoyne-Cecil; 3rd Marquess of Salisbury	29 June 1895	12 November 1900	Conservative	Salisbury (III & IV) (Con.–Lib.U.)	Victoria (1837–1901)
	Henry Petty-Fitzmaurice; 5th Marquess of Lansdowne	12 November 1900	4 December 1905	Liberal Unionist	Salisbury (III & IV) (Con.–Lib.U.)	Victoria (1837–1901)
	Henry Petty-Fitzmaurice; 5th Marquess of Lansdowne	12 November 1900	4 December 1905	Liberal Unionist	Salisbury (III & IV) (Con.–Lib.U.)	Edward VII (1901–1910)
	Henry Petty-Fitzmaurice; 5th Marquess of Lansdowne	12 November 1900	4 December 1905	Liberal Unionist	Balfour	Edward VII (1901–1910)
	Sir Edward Grey, 3rd Bt. MP for Berwick-upon-Tweed	10 December 1905	10 December 1916	Liberal	Campbell-Bannerman	Edward VII (1901–1910)
	Sir Edward Grey, 3rd Bt. MP for Berwick-upon-Tweed	10 December 1905	10 December 1916	Liberal	Asquith (I–III)	Edward VII (1901–1910)
	Sir Edward Grey, 3rd Bt. MP for Berwick-upon-Tweed	10 December 1905	10 December 1916	Liberal	Asquith (I–III)	George V
	Sir Edward Grey, 3rd Bt. MP for Berwick-upon-Tweed	10 December 1905	10 December 1916	Liberal	Asquith Coalition (Lib.–Con.–et al.)	George V
	Arthur Balfour; MP for the City of London	10 December 1916	23 October 1919	Conservative	Lloyd George (I & II)	George V
	George Curzon; 1st Marquess Curzon of Kedleston	23 October 1919	22 January 1924	Conservative	Lloyd George (I & II)	George V
	George Curzon; 1st Marquess Curzon of Kedleston	23 October 1919	22 January 1924	Conservative	Law	George V
	George Curzon; 1st Marquess Curzon of Kedleston	23 October 1919	22 January 1924	Conservative	Baldwin I	George V
	Ramsay MacDonald; MP for Aberavon	22 January 1924	3 November 1924	Labour	MacDonald I	George V
	Austen Chamberlain; MP for Birmingham West	6 November 1924	4 June 1929	Conservative	Baldwin II	George V
	Arthur Henderson; MP for Burnley	7 June 1929	24 August 1931	Labour	MacDonald II	George V
	Rufus Isaacs; 1st Marquess of Reading	25 August 1931	5 November 1931	Liberal	National I (N.Lab.–Con.–et al.)	George V
	Sir John Simon; MP for Spen Valley	5 November 1931	7 June 1935	Liberal National	National II	George V
	Sir Samuel Hoare, 2nd Bt. MP for Chelsea	7 June 1935	18 December 1935	Conservative	National III (Con.–N.Lab.–et al.)	George V
	Anthony Eden; MP for Warwick & Leamington	22 December 1935	20 February 1938	Conservative	National III (Con.–N.Lab.–et al.)	George V
	Anthony Eden; MP for Warwick & Leamington	22 December 1935	20 February 1938	Conservative	National III (Con.–N.Lab.–et al.)	Edward VIII (1936)
	Anthony Eden; MP for Warwick & Leamington	22 December 1935	20 February 1938	Conservative	National III (Con.–N.Lab.–et al.)	George VI
	Anthony Eden; MP for Warwick & Leamington	22 December 1935	20 February 1938	Conservative	National IV	George VI
	Edward Wood; 3rd Viscount Halifax	21 February 1938	22 December 1940	Conservative	National IV	George VI
	Edward Wood; 3rd Viscount Halifax	21 February 1938	22 December 1940	Conservative	Chamberlain War	George VI
	Edward Wood; 3rd Viscount Halifax	21 February 1938	22 December 1940	Conservative	Churchill War (All parties)	George VI
	Anthony Eden; MP for Warwick & Leamington	22 December 1940	26 July 1945	Conservative	Churchill War (All parties)	George VI
	Anthony Eden; MP for Warwick & Leamington	22 December 1940	26 July 1945	Conservative	Churchill Caretaker (Con.–Lib.N.)	George VI
	Ernest Bevin MP for Wandsworth Central → Woolwich East (Note: Elected to a new constituency in the 1950 general election.)	27 July 1945	9 March 1951	Labour	Attlee (I & II)	George VI
	Herbert Morrison; MP for Lewisham South	9 March 1951	26 October 1951	Labour	Attlee (I & II)	George VI
	Anthony Eden; MP for Warwick & Leamington	28 October 1951	7 April 1955	Conservative	Churchill III	George VI
	Anthony Eden; MP for Warwick & Leamington	28 October 1951	7 April 1955	Conservative	Churchill III	Elizabeth II
	Harold Macmillan; MP for Bromley	7 April 1955	20 December 1955	Conservative	Eden	Elizabeth II
	Selwyn Lloyd; MP for Wirral	20 December 1955	27 July 1960	Conservative	Eden	Elizabeth II
	Selwyn Lloyd; MP for Wirral	20 December 1955	27 July 1960	Conservative	Macmillan (I & II)	Elizabeth II
	Alec Douglas-Home; 14th Earl of Home	27 July 1960	18 October 1963	Conservative	Macmillan (I & II)	Elizabeth II
	Richard Austen Butler; MP for Saffron Walden	20 October 1963	16 October 1964	Conservative	Douglas-Home	Elizabeth II
	Patrick Gordon Walker; Neither an MP nor a Lord (Note: Walker was the MP for Smethwick and Labour's shadow foreign secretary, prior to the 1964 general election. He lost his seat in the election but was appointed to the post anyway. He resigned after fighting and losing a 1965 by-election in Leyton.)	16 October 1964	22 January 1965	Labour	Wilson (I & II)	Elizabeth II
	Michael Stewart; MP for Fulham	22 January 1965	11 August 1966	Labour	Wilson (I & II)	Elizabeth II
	George Brown; MP for Belper	11 August 1966	16 March 1968	Labour	Wilson (I & II)	Elizabeth II
	Michael Stewart; MP for Fulham	16 March 1968	17 October 1968	Labour	Wilson (I & II)	Elizabeth II

^† Died in office.

=== Secretaries of state for foreign and Commonwealth affairs (1968–2020) ===
Post created through the merger of the Foreign Office and the Commonwealth Office.

Secretary of state for foreign and Commonwealth affairs
Portrait	Name (Note: Including honorifics and constituencies for elected MPs.) (birth–death)	Term of office		Party	Ministry	Sovereign (Reign)
	Michael Stewart; MP for Fulham (1906–1990)	17 October 1968	19 June 1970	Labour	Wilson (I & II)	Elizabeth II (1952–2022)
	Alec Douglas-Home; MP for Kinross and Western Perthshire (1903–1995)	20 June 1970	4 March 1974	Conservative	Heath	Elizabeth II (1952–2022)
	James Callaghan; MP for Cardiff South East (1912–2005)	5 March 1974	5 April 1976	Labour	Wilson (III & IV)	Elizabeth II (1952–2022)
	Anthony Crosland; MP for Great Grimsby (1918–1977)	8 April 1976	19 February 1977^{†}	Labour	Callaghan	Elizabeth II (1952–2022)
	David Owen; MP for Plymouth Devonport (born 1938)	22 February 1977	4 May 1979	Labour	Callaghan	Elizabeth II (1952–2022)
	Peter Carington; 6th Baron Carrington (1919–2018)	4 May 1979	5 April 1982	Conservative	Thatcher I	Elizabeth II (1952–2022)
	Francis Pym; MP for Cambridgeshire (1922–2008)	6 April 1982	11 June 1983	Conservative	Thatcher I	Elizabeth II (1952–2022)
	Geoffrey Howe; MP for East Surrey (1926–2015)	11 June 1983	24 July 1989	Conservative	Thatcher II	Elizabeth II (1952–2022)
	Geoffrey Howe; MP for East Surrey (1926–2015)	11 June 1983	24 July 1989	Conservative	Thatcher III	Elizabeth II (1952–2022)
	John Major; MP for Huntingdon (born 1943)	24 July 1989	26 October 1989	Conservative	Thatcher III	Elizabeth II (1952–2022)
	Douglas Hurd; MP for Witney (born 1930)	26 October 1989	5 July 1995	Conservative	Thatcher III	Elizabeth II (1952–2022)
	Douglas Hurd; MP for Witney (born 1930)	26 October 1989	5 July 1995	Conservative	Major I	Elizabeth II (1952–2022)
	Douglas Hurd; MP for Witney (born 1930)	26 October 1989	5 July 1995	Conservative	Major II	Elizabeth II (1952–2022)
	Malcolm Rifkind; MP for Edinburgh Pentlands (born 1946)	5 July 1995	2 May 1997	Conservative	Major II	Elizabeth II (1952–2022)
	Robin Cook; MP for Livingston (1946–2005)	2 May 1997	8 June 2001	Labour	Blair I	Elizabeth II (1952–2022)
	Jack Straw; MP for Blackburn (born 1946)	8 June 2001	5 May 2006	Labour	Blair II	Elizabeth II (1952–2022)
	Jack Straw; MP for Blackburn (born 1946)	8 June 2001	5 May 2006	Labour	Blair III	Elizabeth II (1952–2022)
	Margaret Beckett; MP for Derby South (born 1943)	5 May 2006	28 June 2007	Labour	Blair III	Elizabeth II (1952–2022)
	David Miliband; MP for South Shields (born 1965)	28 June 2007	11 May 2010	Labour	Brown	Elizabeth II (1952–2022)
	William Hague; MP for Richmond (Yorks) (born 1961)	12 May 2010	14 July 2014	Conservative	Cameron–Clegg (Con.–L.D.)	Elizabeth II (1952–2022)
	Philip Hammond; MP for Runnymede and Weybridge (born 1955)	14 July 2014	13 July 2016	Conservative	Cameron–Clegg (Con.–L.D.)	Elizabeth II (1952–2022)
	Philip Hammond; MP for Runnymede and Weybridge (born 1955)	14 July 2014	13 July 2016	Conservative	Cameron II	Elizabeth II (1952–2022)
	Boris Johnson; MP for Uxbridge and South Ruislip (born 1964) Tenure	13 July 2016	9 July 2018	Conservative	May I	Elizabeth II (1952–2022)
	Boris Johnson; MP for Uxbridge and South Ruislip (born 1964) Tenure	13 July 2016	9 July 2018	Conservative	May II	Elizabeth II (1952–2022)
	Jeremy Hunt; MP for South West Surrey (born 1966)	9 July 2018	24 July 2019	Conservative	May II	Elizabeth II (1952–2022)
	Dominic Raab; MP for Esher and Walton (born 1974)	24 July 2019	2 September 2020	Conservative	Johnson I	Elizabeth II (1952–2022)
	Dominic Raab; MP for Esher and Walton (born 1974)	24 July 2019	2 September 2020	Conservative	Johnson II	Elizabeth II (1952–2022)

=== Secretaries of state for foreign, Commonwealth and development affairs (2020–present) ===
Post created through the merger of the Foreign and Commonwealth Office and the Department for International Development.

Portrait	Name (Birth–Death)	Term of office		Party	Ministry	Sovereign (Reign)
	Dominic Raab; MP for Esher and Walton (born 1974)	2 September 2020	15 September 2021	Conservative	Johnson II	Elizabeth II (1952–2022)
	Liz Truss; MP for South West Norfolk (born 1975)	15 September 2021	6 September 2022	Conservative	Johnson II	Elizabeth II (1952–2022)
	James Cleverly; MP for Braintree (born 1969)	6 September 2022	13 November 2023	Conservative	Truss	
	James Cleverly; MP for Braintree (born 1969)	6 September 2022	13 November 2023	Conservative	Truss	Charles III (2022–present)
	James Cleverly; MP for Braintree (born 1969)	6 September 2022	13 November 2023	Conservative	Sunak	Charles III (2022–present)
	David Cameron; Sits in the House of Lords (born 1966)	13 November 2023	5 July 2024	Conservative	Sunak	Charles III (2022–present)
	David Lammy; MP for Tottenham (born 1972)	5 July 2024	5 September 2025	Labour	Starmer	Charles III (2022–present)
	Yvette Cooper; MP for Pontefract, Castleford and Knottingley (born 1969)	5 September 2025	20 July 2026	Labour	Starmer	Charles III (2022–present)
	Ed Miliband MP for Doncaster North (born 1969)	20 July 2026	Incumbent	Labour	Burnham	Charles III (2022–present)

== See also ==
- Parliamentary Under-Secretary of State for Foreign, Commonwealth and Development Affairs
- Permanent Under-Secretary of State for Foreign Affairs
- Secretary of State for Commonwealth Affairs
- Secretary of State for Commonwealth Relations
- Secretary of State for the Colonies
- Secretary of State for Dominion Affairs
- Ministry of foreign affairs
- Great Offices of State
