= First Commissioner of Works =

Former UK government role

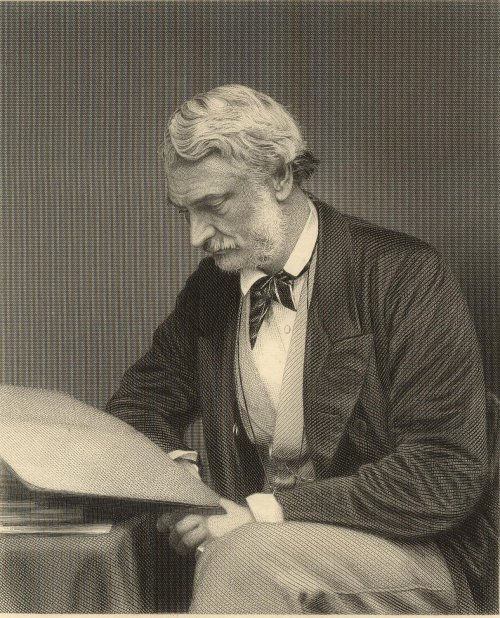
Lord John Manners, later 7th Duke of Rutland, who served thrice as First Commissioner of Works in the 1850s and 1860s

The First Commissioner of Works and Public Buildings was a position within the government of the United Kingdom of Great Britain and Ireland, and subsequent to 1922, within the government of the United Kingdom of Great Britain and Northern Ireland. It took over some of the functions of the First Commissioner of Woods and Forests in 1851 when the portfolio of Crown holdings was divided into the public and the commercial. The position was frequently of cabinet level. The office was renamed Minister of Works and Buildings and First Commissioner of Works in 1940, Minister of Works and Planning upon receiving statutory planning powers from the Ministry of Health in 1942, Minister of Works when those planning powers were moved to the Ministry of Town and Country Planning in 1943, and finally Minister of Public Buildings and Works in 1962. In this last form the commissioner had "additional responsibility for studying the problems of the building industry". On 15 October 1970 the role was amalgamated with the Minister of Transport and the Minister of Housing and Local Government in the Department of the Environment.

== List of Works Commissioners and Ministers ==
=== First Commissioners of Works (1851–1940) ===
First Commissioner of Works
Portrait	Name (Birth–Death)	Term of office		Party	Ministry
	Edward Seymour; Lord Seymour; MP for Totnes (1804–1885)	1 August 1851	21 February 1852	Whig	Russell I
	Lord John Manners; MP for Colchester (1818–1906)	4 March 1852	17 December 1852	Conservative	Who? Who?
	Sir William Molesworth; 8th Baronet; MP for Southwark (1810–1855)	5 January 1853	21 July 1855	Radical	Aberdeen (Peelite–Whig)
	Sir Benjamin Hall; 1st Baronet; MP for Marylebone (1802–1867)	21 July 1855	21 February 1858	Whig	Palmerston I
	Lord John Manners; MP for Leicestershire North (1818–1906)	26 February 1858	11 June 1859	Conservative	Derby–Disraeli II
	Henry FitzRoy; MP for Lewes (1807–1859)	18 June 1859	17 December 1859	Liberal	Palmerston II
	William Cowper; MP for Hertford (1811–1888)	9 February 1860	26 June 1866	Liberal	Palmerston II
	William Cowper; MP for Hertford (1811–1888)	9 February 1860	26 June 1866	Liberal	Russell II
	Lord John Manners; MP for Leicestershire North (1818–1906)	6 July 1866	1 December 1868	Conservative	Derby–Disraeli III
	Austen Henry Layard; MP for Southwark (1817–1894)	9 December 1868	26 October 1869	Liberal	Gladstone I
	Acton Smee Ayrton; MP for Tower Hamlets (1816–1886)	26 October 1869	11 August 1873	Liberal	Gladstone I
	William Patrick Adam; MP for Clackmannanshire and Kinross-shire (1823–1881)	11 August 1873	17 February 1874	Liberal	Gladstone I
	Lord Henry Lennox; MP for Chichester (1821–1886)	21 March 1874	14 August 1876	Conservative	Disraeli II
	Gerard Noel; MP for Rutland (1823–1911)	14 August 1876	21 April 1880	Conservative	Disraeli II
	William Patrick Adam; MP for Clackmannanshire and Kinross-shire (1823–1881)	3 May 1880	1880	Liberal	Gladstone II
	George Shaw Lefevre; MP for Reading (1831–1928)	29 November 1881	13 February 1885	Liberal	Gladstone II
	Archibald Primrose; 5th Earl of Rosebery (1847–1929)	13 February 1885	9 June 1885	Liberal	Gladstone II
	David Plunket; MP for Dublin University (1838–1919)	24 June 1885	28 January 1886	Conservative	Salisbury I
	Albert Parker; 3rd Earl of Morley (1843–1905)	17 February 1886	16 April 1886	Liberal	Gladstone III
	Victor Bruce; 9th Earl of Elgin (1849–1917)	16 April 1886	20 July 1886	Liberal	Gladstone III
	David Plunket; MP for Dublin University (1838–1919)	5 August 1886	11 August 1892	Conservative	Salisbury II
	George Shaw Lefevre; MP for Bradford Central (1831–1928)	18 August 1892	10 March 1894	Liberal	Gladstone IV
	Herbert Gladstone; MP for Leeds West (1854–1930)	10 March 1894	21 June 1895	Liberal	Rosebery
	Aretas Akers-Douglas; MP for St Augustine's (1851–1926)	4 July 1895	11 August 1902	Conservative	Salisbury (III & IV) (Con.–Lib.U.)
	Robert Windsor-Clive; 14th Baron Windsor (1857–1923)	11 August 1902	4 December 1905	Conservative	Balfour (Con.–Lib.U.)
	Lewis Vernon Harcourt; MP for Rossendale (1863–1922)	10 December 1905	3 November 1910	Liberal	Campbell-Bannerman
	Lewis Vernon Harcourt; MP for Rossendale (1863–1922)	10 December 1905	3 November 1910	Liberal	Asquith (I–III)
	William Lygon; 7th Earl Beauchamp (1872–1938)	3 November 1910	6 August 1914	Liberal	Asquith (I–III)
	Alfred Emmott; 1st Baron Emmott (1858–1926)	6 August 1914	25 May 1915	Liberal	Asquith (I–III)
	Lewis Vernon Harcourt; MP for Rossendale (1863–1922)	25 May 1915	10 December 1916	Liberal	Asquith Coalition (Lib.–Con.–Lab.)
	Sir Alfred Mond; 1st Baronet; MP for Swansea West (1868–1930) (Note: MP for Swansea until 1918; MP for Swansea West thereafter)	10 December 1916	1 April 1921	Liberal	Lloyd George (I & II) (Lib.–Con.–Lab.)
	David Lindsay; 27th Earl of Crawford (1871–1940)	1 April 1921	19 October 1922	Conservative	Lloyd George (I & II) (Lib.–Con.–Lab.)
	Sir John Baird; 2nd Baronet; MP for Ayr Burghs (1874–1941)	31 October 1922	22 January 1924	Conservative	Law
	Sir John Baird; 2nd Baronet; MP for Ayr Burghs (1874–1941)	31 October 1922	22 January 1924	Conservative	Baldwin I
	Fred Jowett; MP for Bradford East (1864–1944)	22 January 1924	3 November 1924	Labour	MacDonald I
	William Wellesley Peel; 2nd Viscount Peel (1867–1937)	10 November 1924	18 October 1928	Conservative	Baldwin II
	Charles Vane-Tempest-Stewart; 7th Marquess of Londonderry (1878–1949)	18 October 1928	4 June 1929	Conservative	Baldwin II
	George Lansbury; MP for Bow and Bromley (1859–1940)	7 June 1929	24 August 1931	Labour	MacDonald II
	Charles Vane-Tempest-Stewart; 7th Marquess of Londonderry (1878–1949)	25 August 1931	5 November 1931	Conservative	National I (N.Lab.–Con.–Lib.N.–Lib.)
	William Ormsby-Gore; MP for Stafford (1885–1964)	5 November 1931	16 June 1936	Conservative	National II (N.Lab.–Con.–Lib.N.–Lib.)
	William Ormsby-Gore; MP for Stafford (1885–1964)	5 November 1931	16 June 1936	Conservative	National III (Con.–N.Lab.–Lib.N.)
	James Stanhope; 7th Earl Stanhope (1880–1967)	16 June 1936	27 May 1937	Conservative	National III (Con.–N.Lab.–Lib.N.)
	Sir Philip Sassoon; 3rd Baronet; MP for Hythe (1888–1939)	27 May 1937	7 June 1939	Conservative	National IV (Con.–N.Lab.–Lib.N.)
	Herwald Ramsbotham; MP for Lancaster (1887–1971)	7 June 1939	3 April 1940	Conservative	National IV (Con.–N.Lab.–Lib.N.)
	Herwald Ramsbotham; MP for Lancaster (1887–1971)	7 June 1939	3 April 1940	Conservative	Chamberlain War (Con.–N.Lab.–Lib.N.)
	Herbrand Sackville; 9th Earl De La Warr (1900–1976)	3 April 1940	18 May 1940	National Labour	Chamberlain War (Con.–N.Lab.–Lib.N.)
	George Tryon; 1st Baron Tryon (1871–1940)	18 May 1940	3 October 1940	Conservative	Churchill War (All parties)

=== Ministers of Works & Buildings and First Commissioner of Works (1940–1942) ===
Minister of Works & Buildings and First Commissioner of Works
Portrait	Name (Birth–Death)	Term of office		Party	Ministry
	John Reith; 1st Baron Reith (1889–1971) (Note: MP for Southampton until 21 October 1940; elevated to the House of Lords as Baron Reith thereafter)	3 October 1940	11 February 1942	Independent (National)	Churchill War (All parties)

=== Ministers of Works and Planning (1942–1943) ===
Minister of Works and Planning
Portrait	Name (Birth–Death)	Term of office		Party	Ministry
	John Reith; 1st Baron Reith (1889–1971)	3 October 1940	11 February 1942	Independent (National)	Churchill War (All parties)
	Wyndham Portal; 1st Baron Portal (1885–1949)	22 February 1942	February; 1943	Conservative	Churchill War (All parties)

=== Ministers of Works (1943–1962) ===
Minister of Works
Portrait	Name (Birth–Death)	Term of office		Party	Ministry
	Wyndham Portal; 1st Baron Portal (1885–1949)	February; 1943	21 November 1944	Conservative	Churchill War (All parties)
	Duncan Sandys; MP for Norwood (1908–1987)	21 November 1944	26 July 1945	Conservative	Churchill War (All parties)
	Duncan Sandys; MP for Norwood (1908–1987)	21 November 1944	26 July 1945	Conservative	Churchill Caretaker (Con.–N.Lib.)
	George Tomlinson; MP for Farnworth (1890–1952)	4 August 1945	10 February 1947	Labour	Attlee (I & II)
	Charles Key; MP for Bow and Bromley (1883–1964)	10 February 1947	28 February 1950	Labour	Attlee (I & II)
	Richard Stokes; MP for Ipswich (1897–1957)	28 February 1950	26 April 1951	Labour	Attlee (I & II)
	George Brown; MP for Belper (1914–1985)	26 April 1951	26 October 1951	Labour	Attlee (I & II)
	Sir David Eccles; MP for Chippenham (1904–1999)	1 November 1951	18 October 1954	Conservative	Churchill III
	Nigel Birch; MP for West Flintshire (1906–1981)	18 October 1954	20 December 1955	Conservative	Churchill III
	Patrick Buchan-Hepburn; MP for Beckenham (1901–1974)	20 December 1955	16 January 1957	Conservative	Eden
	Hugh Molson; MP for High Peak (1903–1991)	16 January 1957	22 October 1959	Conservative	Macmillan (I & II)
	Lord John Hope; MP for Edinburgh Pentlands (1912–1996)	22 October 1959	16 July 1962	Conservative	Macmillan (I & II)

=== Ministers of Public Buildings and Works (1962–1970) ===
Minister of Public Buildings and Works
Portrait	Name (Birth–Death)	Term of office		Party	Ministry
	Geoffrey Rippon; MP for Norwich South (1924–1997)	16 July 1962	10 October 1964	Conservative	Macmillan (I & II)
	Geoffrey Rippon; MP for Norwich South (1924–1997)	16 July 1962	10 October 1964	Conservative	Douglas-Home
	Charles Pannell; MP for Leeds West (1902–1980)	19 October 1964	6 April 1966	Labour	Wilson (I & II)
	Reg Prentice; MP for East Ham North (1923–2001)	6 April 1966	29 August 1967	Labour	Wilson (I & II)
	Bob Mellish; MP for Bermondsey (1913–1998)	29 August 1967	30 April 1969	Labour	Wilson (I & II)
	John Silkin; MP for Deptford (1923–1987)	30 April 1969	19 June 1970	Labour	Wilson (I & II)
	Julian Amery; MP for Brighton Pavilion (1919–1996)	23 June 1970	15 October 1970	Conservative	Heath
