= Great Offices of State =

Four senior ministerial offices in the UK government

The Great Offices of State are senior political offices in important ministerial portfolios in the UK government. They are (in order of seniority) the Prime Minister, the Chancellor of the Exchequer, the Foreign Secretary, and the Home Secretary.

== History ==
=== Roles and early history ===
The Great Offices of State are derived from the most senior positions in the Royal Household – the Great Officers of State. These eventually became largely hereditary and mostly honorary titles, while the substantive duties of the respective officers passed to leading, powerful, individual politicians, each of whom sat usually in the House of Commons, who were appointed by the monarch to their various ministries on the advice of the Prime Minister.

John Simon, 1st Viscount Simon became the first person to have held three of the Great Offices of State other than Prime Minister. He served as Home Secretary from 1915 to 1916 and from 1935 to 1937, Foreign Secretary from 1931 to 1935, and then as Chancellor of the Exchequer from 1937 to 1940. Rab Butler became the second person to have held all three of the offices but not Prime Minister, having served as Chancellor of the Exchequer from 1951 to 1955, Home Secretary from 1957 to 1962, and as Foreign Secretary 1963 and 1964.

James Callaghan is the only person to have served in all four positions.

=== Truss and Sunak government ===
The Truss ministry formed on 6 September 2022 and initially had no white men holding positions in the Great Offices of State, for the first time in British political history. This remained the case for just 38 days until the appointment of Jeremy Hunt as Chancellor of the Exchequer on 14 October 2022, replacing Kwasi Kwarteng who had been the first black Chancellor. Five days later on 19 October 2022, Grant Shapps was appointed Home Secretary, replacing Suella Braverman, although Braverman was then reappointed by incoming Prime Minister Rishi Sunak just six days later.

Following Sunak's reshuffle in November 2023, this marked the first instance since May 2010 where no women occupied a Great Office of State. It also marked the first 21st century instance of a former prime minister holding another Great Office of State, with newly appointed Lord temporal David Cameron being appointed as Foreign Secretary in the Sunak ministry, becoming the first former prime minister to serve in a ministerial post since Alec Douglas-Home in 1970−1974.

=== Starmer government ===
Following the general election on 4 July 2024, Prime Minister Keir Starmer appointed Rachel Reeves as Chancellor of the Exchequer, thus making Reeves the first female Chancellor in the 708-year history of HM Treasury. Starmer appointed women to a record half of all cabinet posts, including three of the top five positions in the government: along with Reeves, Angela Rayner became Deputy Prime Minister and Yvette Cooper was made Home Secretary.

Following the 2025 cabinet reshuffle, which occurred after the resignation of Rayner, Shabana Mahmood was appointed Home Secretary, while Cooper was appointed Foreign Secretary, and Reeves stayed in position. This marked the first time in British political history where three of the great offices of state were held by women.

=== Public views ===
According to a YouGov poll conducted in 2017, the British public view the three most senior cabinet ministers as the Chancellor of the Exchequer, the Secretary of State for Health and Social Care, and the Secretary of State for Defence, with the office of Home Secretary coming in fourth place, and that of Foreign Secretary in just ninth place, preceded by the Secretary of State for Work and Pensions and followed by the Secretary of State for International Trade. The office of Secretary of State for Digital, Culture, Media and Sport was viewed as least important, with just 3% of respondents saying they viewed it as one of the most important positions.

== Current ==
Great Offices of State of His Majesty's Government
Burnham ministry
Office	Name		Start	Concurrent government office(s)	Most recent cabinet role(s)
Prime Minister	Andy Burnham	Andy Burnham; MP for Makerfield	20 July 2026 (3 months ago)	First Lord of the Treasury; Minister for the Civil Service; Minister for the Union	Health Secretary (2009–2010)
Chancellor of the Exchequer		John Healey; MP for Rawmarsh and Conisbrough	20 July 2026 (3 months ago)	Second Lord of the Treasury	Defence Secretary (2024–2026)
Foreign Secretary (Secretary of State for Foreign, Commonwealth and Development Affairs)		Ed Miliband; MP for Doncaster North	20 July 2026 (3 months ago)		Energy Secretary (2024–2026)
Home Secretary (Secretary of State for the Home Department)		Shabana Mahmood; MP for Birmingham Ladywood	5 September 2025 (13 months ago)		Justice Secretary and Lord Chancellor (2024–2025)

== See also ==
- Cabinet of the United Kingdom
- List of shadow holders of the Great Offices of State
