= Liberal government, 1859–1866 =

Government of Great Britain and Ireland

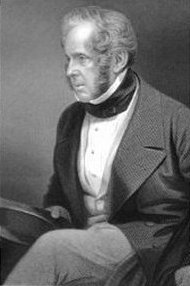
Lord Palmerston led the Government until his death from 1859–1865 and was succeeded by Lord Russell.

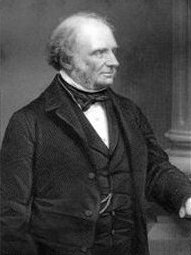
Russell led the Government after Palmerston died in 1865. His government was replaced in 1866.

The Liberal government of the United Kingdom of Great Britain and Ireland that began in 1859 and ended in 1866 consisted of two ministries: the second Palmerston ministry and the second Russell ministry.

== History ==
After the fall of the second of Lord Derby's short-lived attempts at governments in 1859, Henry John Temple, 3rd Viscount Palmerston returned to power, this time in alliance with his former rival, John Russell, 1st Earl Russell, in the first Liberal government. Palmerston remained as prime minister until his death in 1865, when Russell succeeded him. However, disunity within the party caused the fall of the government in the following year, and Edward Smith-Stanley, 14th Earl of Derby formed another Conservative ministry.

== Cabinets ==
=== The Viscount Palmerston's Cabinet, June 1859 – October 1865 ===
- Henry John Temple, 3rd Viscount Palmerston– First Lord of the Treasury and Leader of the House of Commons
- John Campbell, 1st Baron Campbell – Lord Chancellor
- Granville George Leveson-Gower, 2nd Earl Granville – Lord President of the Council and Leader of the House of Lords
- George Douglas Campbell, 8th Duke of Argyll – Lord Privy Seal
- Sir George Cornewall Lewis – Secretary of State for the Home Department
- Lord John Russell – Secretary of State for Foreign Affairs
- Henry Pelham-Clinton, 5th Duke of Newcastle – Secretary of State for the Colonies
- Sidney Herbert – Secretary of State for War
- Sir Charles Wood, 3rd Baronet – Secretary of State for India
- Edward Adolphus Seymour, 12th Duke of Somerset – First Lord of the Admiralty
- William Ewart Gladstone – Chancellor of the Exchequer
- Edward Cardwell – Chief Secretary for Ireland
- Thomas Milner Gibson – President of the Board of Trade and of the Poor Law Board
- Sir George Grey, 2nd Baronet – Chancellor of the Duchy of Lancaster
- James Bruce, 8th Earl of Elgin – Postmaster-General

==== Changes ====
- July 1859 – Charles Pelham Villiers succeeds Milner-Gibson as President of the Poor Law Board (Milner-Gibson remains at the Board of Trade)
- May 1860 – Edward Stanley, 2nd Baron Stanley of Alderley succeeds Lord Elgin as Postmaster-General
- June 1861 – Richard Bethell, 1st Baron Westbury succeeds Lord Campbell as Lord Chancellor
- July 1861 – Sir George Cornewall Lewis succeeds Herbert as Secretary for War. Sir George Grey succeeds Lewis as Home Secretary. Edward Cardwell succeeds Grey as Chancellor of the Duchy of Lancaster. Cardwell's successor as Chief Secretary for Ireland is not in the Cabinet.
- April 1863 – George Robinson, 3rd Earl de Grey becomes Secretary for War following Sir George Lewis's death.
- April 1864 – Edward Cardwell succeeds the Duke of Newcastle as Colonial Secretary. George Villiers, 4th Earl of Clarendon succeeds Cardwell as Chancellor of the Duchy of Lancaster.
- July 1865 – Robert Rolfe, 1st Baron Cranworth succeeds Lord Westbury as Lord Chancellor

=== The Earl Russell's Cabinet, October 1865 – June 1866 ===
Office	Name	Term
First Lord of the Treasury; Leader of the House of Lords	John Russell, 1st Earl Russell	October 1865 – June 1866
Lord Chancellor	Robert Rolfe, 1st Baron Cranworth	October 1865 – June 1866
Lord President of the Council	Granville Leveson-Gower, 2nd Earl Granville	October 1865 – June 1866
Lord Privy Seal	George Campbell, 8th Duke of Argyll	October 1865 – June 1866
Chancellor of the Exchequer; Leader of the House of Commons	William Ewart Gladstone	October 1865 – June 1866
Home Secretary	Sir George Grey, 2nd Baronet	October 1865 – June 1866
Foreign Secretary	George Villiers, 4th Earl of Clarendon	October 1865 – June 1866
Secretary of State for the Colonies	Edward Cardwell	October 1865 – June 1866
Secretary of State for War	George Robinson, 3rd Earl de Grey	October 1865 – February 1866
	Spencer Cavendish, Marquess of Hartington	February–June 1866
Secretary of State for India	Sir Charles Wood, 3rd Baronet	October 1865 – February 1866
	George Robinson, 3rd Earl de Grey	February–June 1866
First Lord of the Admiralty	Edward Seymour, 12th Duke of Somerset	October 1865 – June 1866
President of the Board of Trade	Thomas Milner Gibson	October 1865 – June 1866
Chancellor of the Duchy of Lancaster	George Goschen	January–June 1866
President of the Poor Law Board	Charles Pelham Villiers	October 1865 – June 1866
Postmaster General	Edward Stanley, 2nd Baron Stanley of Alderley	October 1865 – June 1866

==== Changes ====
- February 1866: The Lord de Grey succeeds Sir Charles Wood as Secretary for India. Lord Hartington succeeds Grey as Secretary for War.

== List of ministers ==
Cabinet members are listed in bold face.

Office	Name	Date
Prime Minister First Lord of the Treasury	**Henry John Temple, 3rd Viscount Palmerston** (Note: Also Leader of the House of Commons.)	12 June 1859 – 18 October 1865
Prime Minister First Lord of the Treasury	**John Russell, 1st Earl Russell** (Note: Also Leader of the House of Lords 29 October 1865 – 26 June 1866.)	29 October 1865 – 26 June 1866
Chancellor of the Exchequer	**William Ewart Gladstone** (Note: Also Leader of the House of Commons 1865–1866.)	18 June 1859
Parliamentary Secretary to the Treasury	Henry Brand	24 June 1859
Financial Secretary to the Treasury	Samuel Laing	24 June 1859
Financial Secretary to the Treasury	Frederick Peel	2 November 1860
Financial Secretary to the Treasury	Hugh Childers	19 August 1865
Junior Lords of the Treasury	Edward Knatchbull-Hugessen	24 June 1859 – 21 April 1865
Junior Lords of the Treasury	Sir William Dunbar, 7th Baronet	24 June 1859 – 21 April 1865
Junior Lords of the Treasury	John Bagwell	24 June 1859 – 25 March 1862
Junior Lords of the Treasury	Luke White	25 March 1862 – 2 June 1866
Junior Lords of the Treasury	William Patrick Adam	21 April 1865 – 26 June 1866
Junior Lords of the Treasury	John Bonham Carter	2 June 1866 – 26 June 1866
Junior Lords of the Treasury	John Esmonde	2 June 1866 – 26 June 1866
Lord Chancellor	**John Campbell, 1st Baron Campbell**	18 June 1859
Lord Chancellor	**Richard Bethell, 1st Baron Westbury**	26 June 1861
Lord Chancellor	**Robert Rolfe, 1st Baron Cranworth**	7 July 1865
Lord President of the Council	**Granville Leveson-Gower, 2nd Earl Granville** (Note: Also Leader of the House of Lords 18 June 1859 – 29 October 1865.)	18 June 1859
Lord Privy Seal	**George Campbell, 8th Duke of Argyll**	18 June 1859
Secretary of State for the Home Department	**Sir George Cornewall Lewis**	18 June 1859
Secretary of State for the Home Department	**Sir George Grey, 2nd Baronet**	25 July 1861
Under-Secretary of State for the Home Department	George Clive	18 June 1859
Under-Secretary of State for the Home Department	Henry Bruce	14 November 1862
Under-Secretary of State for the Home Department	Thomas Baring	25 April 1864
Under-Secretary of State for the Home Department	Edward Knatchbull-Hugessen	25 May 1866
Secretary of State for Foreign Affairs	**Lord John Russell** (Note: Created Earl Russell on 30 July 1861.)	18 June 1859
Secretary of State for Foreign Affairs	**George Villiers, 4th Earl of Clarendon**	3 November 1865
Under-Secretary of State for Foreign Affairs	John Wodehouse, 3rd Baron Wodehouse	19 June 1859
Under-Secretary of State for Foreign Affairs	Austen Henry Layard	15 August 1861
Secretary of State for War	**Sidney Herbert** (Note: Created Baron Herbert of Lea on 15 January 1861.)	18 June 1859
Secretary of State for War	**Sir George Cornewall Lewis**	22 July 1861
Secretary of State for War	**George Robinson, 3rd Earl de Grey**	28 April 1863
Secretary of State for War	**Spencer Cavendish, Marquess of Hartington**	16 February 1866
Under-Secretary of State for War	George Robinson, 3rd Earl de Grey	18 June 1859
Under-Secretary of State for War	Thomas Baring	21 January 1861
Under-Secretary of State for War	George Robinson, 3rd Earl de Grey	31 July 1861
Under-Secretary of State for War	Spencer Cavendish, Marquess of Hartington	28 April 1863
Under-Secretary of State for War	Frederick Hamilton-Temple-Blackwood, 5h Baron Dufferin and Clandeboye	17 February 1866
Secretary of State for the Colonies	**Henry Pelham-Clinton, 5th Duke of Newcastle**	18 June 1859
Secretary of State for the Colonies	**Edward Cardwell**	7 April 1864
Under-Secretary of State for the Colonies	Chichester Fortescue	18 June 1859
Under-Secretary of State for the Colonies	William Edward Forster	25 November 1865
Secretary of State for India	**Sir Charles Wood, 3rd Baronet**	18 June 1859
Secretary of State for India	**George Robinson, 3rd Earl de Grey**	16 February 1866
Under-Secretary of State for India	Thomas Baring	25 June 1859
Under-Secretary of State for India	George Robinson, 3rd Earl de Grey	21 January 1861
Under-Secretary of State for India	Thomas Baring	31 July 1861
Under-Secretary of State for India	John Wodehouse, 3rd Baron Wodehouse	25 April 1864
Under-Secretary of State for India	Frederick Hamilton-Temple-Blackwood, 5th Baron Dufferin and Clandeboye	16 November 1864
Under-Secretary of State for India	James Stansfeld	17 February 1866
First Lord of the Admiralty	**Edward Seymour, 12th Duke of Somerset**	27 June 1859
First Secretary of the Admiralty	Lord Clarence Paget	30 June 1859
First Secretary of the Admiralty	Thomas Baring	30 April 1866
Civil Lord of the Admiralty	Samuel Whitbread	27 June 1859
Civil Lord of the Admiralty	Spencer Cavendish, Marquess of Hartington	23 March 1863
Civil Lord of the Admiralty	James Stansfeld	2 May 1863
Civil Lord of the Admiralty	Hugh Childers	21 April 1864
Civil Lord of the Admiralty	Henry Fenwick	22 January 1866
Civil Lord of the Admiralty	Lord John Hay	7 April 1866
Civil Lord of the Admiralty	George Shaw-Lefevre	8 May 1866
Chief Secretary for Ireland	**Edward Cardwell**	24 June 1859
Chief Secretary for Ireland	Sir Robert Peel, 3rd Baronet	29 July 1861
Chief Secretary for Ireland	Chichester Fortescue	7 December 1865
Lord Lieutenant of Ireland	George Howard, 7th Earl of Carlisle	24 June 1859
Lord Lieutenant of Ireland	John Wodehouse, 3rd Baron Wodehouse	1 November 1864
Chancellor of the Duchy of Lancaster	**Sir George Grey, 2nd Baronet**	22 June 1859
Chancellor of the Duchy of Lancaster	**Edward Cardwell**	25 July 1861
Chancellor of the Duchy of Lancaster	**George Villiers, 4th Earl of Clarendon**	7 April 1864
Chancellor of the Duchy of Lancaster	vacant	3 November 1865
Chancellor of the Duchy of Lancaster	**George Goschen**	26 January 1866
President of the Poor Law Board	**Thomas Milner Gibson**	24 June 1859
President of the Poor Law Board	**Charles Pelham Villiers**	9 July 1859
Parliamentary Secretary to the Poor Law Board	Charles Gilpin	28 June 1859
Parliamentary Secretary to the Poor Law Board	George Byng	22 February 1865
Postmaster-General	**James Bruce, 8th Earl of Elgin**	24 June 1859
Postmaster-General	**George Campbell, 8th Duke of Argyll**	11 May 1860
Postmaster-General	**Edward Stanley, 2nd Baron Stanley of Alderley**	17 August 1860
President of the Board of Trade	vacant	
President of the Board of Trade	**Thomas Milner Gibson**	6 July 1859
Vice-President of the Board of Trade	James Wilson	18 June 1859
Vice-President of the Board of Trade	William Francis Cowper	12 August 1859
Vice-President of the Board of Trade	William Hutt (Note: Knight Commander of the Order of the Bath from 27 November 1865.)	22 February 1860
Vice-President of the Board of Trade	George Goschen	29 November 1865
Vice-President of the Board of Trade	William Monsell	12 March 1866
Vice-President of the Committee on Education	Robert Lowe	24 June 1859
Vice-President of the Committee on Education	Henry Bruce	26 April 1864
Paymaster General	James Wilson	18 June 1859
Paymaster General	William Francis Cowper	12 August 1859
Paymaster General	William Hutt	22 February 1860
Paymaster General	George Goschen	29 November 1865
Paymaster General	William Monsell	12 March 1866
First Commissioner of Works	Henry Fitzroy	18 June 1859
First Commissioner of Works	William Francis Cowper	9 February 1860
Attorney General	Sir Richard Bethell	18 June 1859
Attorney General	Sir William Atherton	4 July 1861
Attorney General	Sir Roundell Palmer	2 October 1863
Solicitor General	Sir Henry Keating	18 June 1859
Solicitor General	Sir William Atherton	16 December 1859
Solicitor General	Sir Roundell Palmer	8 July 1861
Solicitor General	Sir Robert Collier	2 October 1863
Judge Advocate General	Thomas Emerson Headlam	24 June 1859
Lord Advocate	James Moncreiff	24 June 1859
Solicitor General for Scotland	Edward F. Maitland	27 June 1859
Solicitor General for Scotland	George Young	11 November 1862
Attorney General for Ireland	John David Fitzgerald	June 1859
Attorney General for Ireland	Rickard Deasy	February 1860
Attorney General for Ireland	Thomas O'Hagan	1861
Attorney General for Ireland	James Anthony Lawson	1865
Solicitor General for Ireland	John George	June 1859
Solicitor General for Ireland	Rickard Deasy	1859
Solicitor General for Ireland	Thomas O'Hagan	February 1860
Solicitor General for Ireland	James Anthony Lawson	1861
Solicitor General for Ireland	Edward Sullivan	1865
Lord Steward of the Household	Edward Eliot, 3rd Earl of St Germans	18 June 1859
Lord Steward of the Household	John Ponsonby, 5th Earl of Bessborough	20 January 1866
Lord Chamberlain of the Household	John Townshend, 3rd Viscount Sydney	23 June 1859
Vice-Chamberlain of the Household	Valentine Browne, Viscount Castlerosse	23 June 1859
Master of the Horse	George Brudenell-Bruce, 2nd Marquess of Ailesbury	24 June 1859
Treasurer of the Household	William Keppel, Viscount Bury	23 June 1859
Treasurer of the Household	Lord Otho Fitzgerald|	8 May 1866
Comptroller of the Household	Granville Proby, Baron Proby	23 June 1859
Captain of the Gentlemen-at-Arms	Thomas Foley, 4th Baron Foley	28 June 1859
Captain of the Yeomen of the Guard	Henry Reynolds-Moreton, 3rd Earl of Ducie	28 June 1859
Master of the Buckhounds	John Ponsonby, 5th Earl of Bessborough	18 June 1859
Master of the Buckhounds	Richard Boyle, 9th Earl of Cork	23 January 1866
Chief Equerry and Clerk Marshal	Lord Alfred Paget	1 July 1859
Mistress of the Robes	Harriet Sutherland-Leveson-Gower, Duchess of Sutherland	22 June 1859
Mistress of the Robes	Elizabeth Wellesley, Duchess of Wellington	25 April 1861
Lords in Waiting	James Sinclair, 14th Earl of Caithness	23 June 1859 – 26 June 1866
Lords in Waiting	Thomas Stonor, 3rd Baron Camoys	23 June 1859 – 26 June 1866
Lords in Waiting	George Pitt-Rivers, 4th Baron Rivers	23 June 1859 – 28 April 1866
Lords in Waiting	George Warren, 2nd Baron de Tabley	23 June 1859 – 26 June 1866
Lords in Waiting	Richard Dawson, 3rd Baron Cremorne	23 June 1859 – 26 June 1866
Lords in Waiting	Frederick Methuen, 2nd Baron Methuen	23 June 1859 – 26 June 1866
Lords in Waiting	George Byng, 7th Viscount Torrington (Note: Permanent.)	23 June 1859 – 27 April 1884
Lords in Waiting	George Byron, 7th Baron Byron	17 July 1837 – 31 March 1860
Lords in Waiting	George Harris, 3rd Baron Harris	31 March 1860 – 4 May 1863
Lords in Waiting	James Talbot, 4th Baron Talbot of Malahide	4 May 1863 – 26 June 1866
Lords in Waiting	George Phipps, 2nd Marquess of Normanby	8 May 1866 – 26 June 1866
Extra Lord in Waiting	George Byron, 7th Baron Byron	31 March 1860 – 3 March 1868

Notes

Preceded by Second Derby–Disraeli ministry	Government of the United Kingdom; 1859–1866	Succeeded by Third Derby–Disraeli ministry
