= Home Secretary =

Member of the Cabinet of the United Kingdom

United Kingdom Secretary of State for the Home Department
- Royal Arms as used by the Home Office

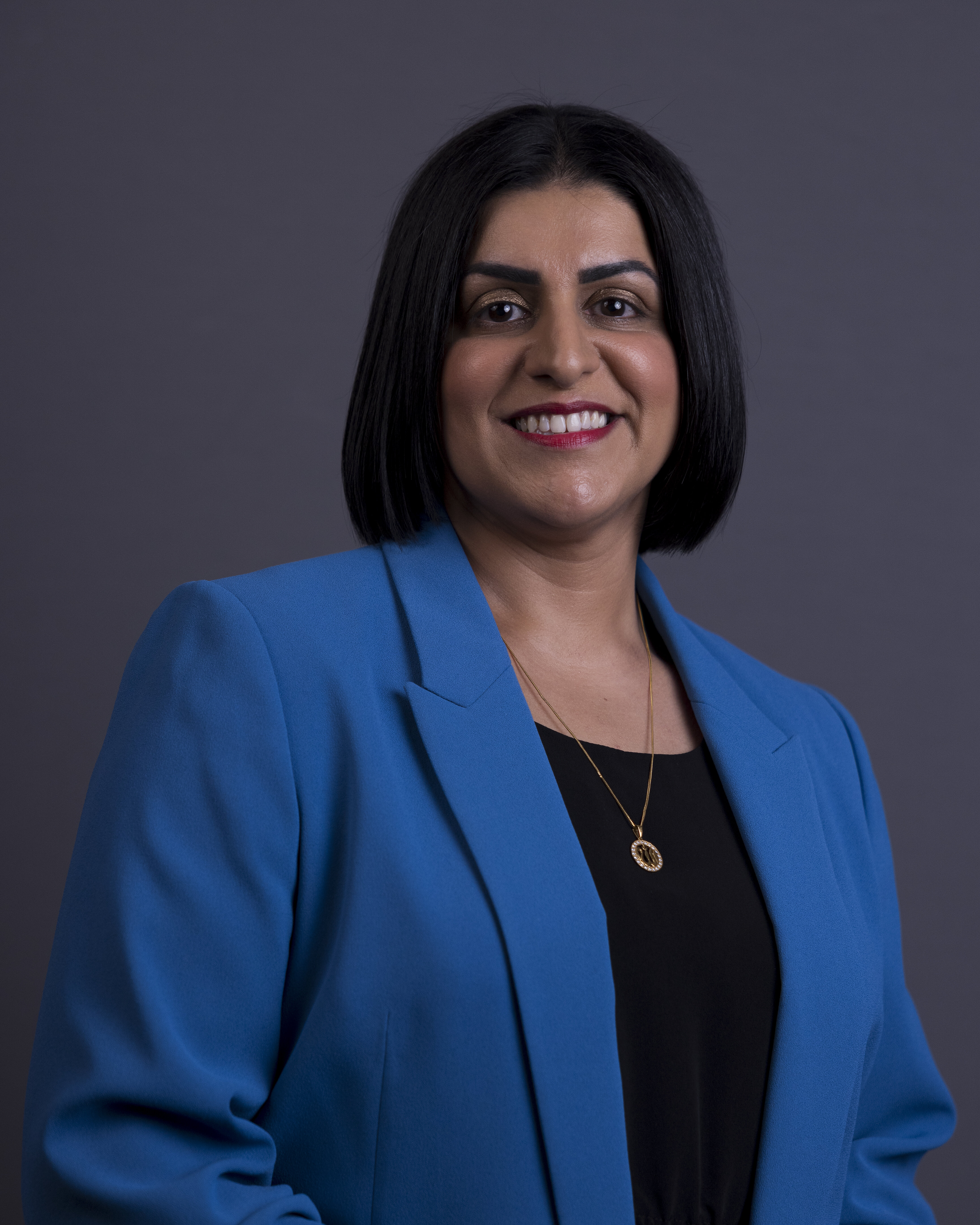
- Incumbent; Shabana Mahmood since 5 September 2025
- Home Office
- Style: Home Secretary (informal); The Right Honourable (within the UK and Commonwealth)
- Type: Minister of the Crown
- Status: Secretary of State; Great Office of State
- Member of: Cabinet; Privy Council; National Security Council
- Reports to: The Prime Minister
- Seat: Westminster
- Nominator: The Prime Minister
- Appointer: The Monarch; (on the advice of the Prime Minister)
- Term length: At His Majesty's pleasure
- Formation: 27 March 1782
- First holder: Earl of Shelburne
- Deputy: Minister of State for Security
- Salary: £159,038 per annum (2022) (including £86,584 MP salary)
- Website: www.gov.uk/government/ministers/secretary-of-state-for-the-home-department

The secretary of state for the Home Department, more commonly known as the home secretary, is a senior minister of the Crown in the Government of the United Kingdom and the head of the Home Office, equivalent to an interior minister. The position is a Great Office of State, making the home secretary one of the most senior and influential ministers in the government. The incumbent is a statutory member of the British Cabinet and National Security Council.

The position was created in 1782, though its responsibilities have changed many times. Past office holders have included the prime ministers Lord North, Robert Peel, the Duke of Wellington, Lord Palmerston, Winston Churchill, James Callaghan and Theresa May. The longest-serving home secretary is Henry Addington, 1st Viscount Sidmouth, who held the post continuously for 9 years, 221 days. The shortest-serving home secretary is Grant Shapps, who served in the position for the final six days of the premiership of Liz Truss. In 2007, Jacqui Smith became the first female home secretary. The incumbent home secretary is Shabana Mahmood, who has served since 5 September 2025 and was reappointed on the formation of the Burnham ministry on 20 July 2026.

The office holder works alongside the other Home Office ministers and the permanent under-secretary of state of the Home Office. The corresponding shadow minister is the shadow home secretary, and the performance of the home secretary is also scrutinized by the Home Affairs Select Committee in the House of Commons and the Justice and Home Affairs Committee in the House of Lords.

Historically, the role has been regarded as a political dead end for aspiring politicians, due to the numerous potential issues and controversies it tends to involve.

== Responsibilities ==
Corresponding to what is generally known as an interior minister in many other countries, the home secretary's remit includes:

- Oversight of Home Office ministers
- Law enforcement in England and Wales and UK wide elements of policing, that are not devolved. (Note: While the Home Secretary has direct oversight over all law enforcement in England and Wales, they also have some oversight over areas in Scotland and Northern Irelands relating to matters such as counter-terrorism and oversight of UK Wide law enforcement organisations such the National Crime Agency and Immigration Enforcement.)
- Matters of national security and counter-terrorism
- Matters of immigration and border security
- Oversight of the Security Service (MI5).

Formerly, the home secretary was the minister responsible for prisons and probation in England and Wales; however in 2007 those responsibilities were transferred to the Ministry of Justice under the lord chancellor.

From the birth of King Edward VIII in 1894 until the birth of Princess Alexandra of Kent in 1936, the home secretary would be present at all royal births to verify that the baby and potential heir to the throne was a descendent of the monarch, and not an imposter. Prior to this, a wider range of privy counsellors would attend. The practice was abolished by King George VI shortly before the birth of King Charles III.

== History ==
The title Secretary of State in the government of England dates back to the early 17th century. The position of Secretary of State for the Home Department was created in the British governmental reorganisation of 1782, in which the responsibilities of the Northern and Southern Departments were reformed into the Foreign Office and Home Office.

In 2007, the new Ministry of Justice took on the criminal justice functions of the Home Office and its agencies.

== List of home secretaries ==
Secretary of State for the Home Department Including constituencies for elected MPs.	Term of office		Party	Ministry	Monarch (Reign)
William Petty; 2nd Earl of Shelburne	27 March 1782	10 July 1782	Whig	Rockingham II	George III (1760–1820) (Note: The Prince of Wales served as prince regent from 5 February 1811.)
Thomas Townsend; MP for Whitchurch	10 July 1782	2 April 1783	Whig	Shelburne (Whig–Tory)	George III (1760–1820)
Frederick North; Lord North; MP for Banbury	2 April 1783	19 December 1783	Tory	Fox–North	George III (1760–1820)
George Nugent-Temple-Grenville; 3rd Earl Temple	19 December 1783	23 December 1783	Tory	Pitt I	George III (1760–1820)
Thomas Townsend; 1st Baron Sydney	23 December 1783	5 June 1789	Whig	Pitt I	George III (1760–1820)
William Grenville; 1st Baron Grenville; MP for Buckinghamshire (Note: Elevated to the Peerage of Great Britain in 1790.) (1759–1834)	5 June 1789	8 June 1791	Tory	Pitt I	George III (1760–1820)
Henry Dundas; MP for Edinburgh	8 June 1791	11 July 1794	Tory	Pitt I	George III (1760–1820)
William Cavendish-Bentinck; 3rd Duke of Portland	11 July 1794	30 July 1801	Tory	Pitt I	George III (1760–1820)
William Cavendish-Bentinck; 3rd Duke of Portland	11 July 1794	30 July 1801	Tory	Addington	George III (1760–1820)
Thomas Pelham; 4th Baron Pelham of Stanmer	30 July 1801	17 August 1803	Whig	Addington	George III (1760–1820)
Charles Philip Yorke; MP for Cambridgeshire	17 August 1803	12 May 1804	Tory	Addington	George III (1760–1820)
Robert Jenkinson; 2nd Baron Hawkesbury	12 May 1804	5 February 1806	Tory	Pitt II	George III (1760–1820)
George Spencer; 2nd Earl Spencer	5 February 1806	25 March 1807	Whig	All the Talents (Whig–Tory)	George III (1760–1820)
Robert Jenkinson; 2nd Earl of Liverpool	25 March 1807	1 November 1809	Tory	Portland II	George III (1760–1820)
Richard Ryder; MP for Tiverton	1 November 1809	8 June 1812	Tory	Perceval	George III (1760–1820)
Henry Addington; 1st Viscount Sidmouth	11 June 1812	17 January 1822	Tory	Liverpool	George III (1760–1820)
Henry Addington; 1st Viscount Sidmouth	11 June 1812	17 January 1822	Tory	Liverpool	George IV (1820–1830)
Robert Peel; MP for Oxford University	17 January 1822	10 April 1827	Tory	Liverpool	George IV (1820–1830)
William Sturges Bourne; MP for Ashburton	30 April 1827	16 July 1827	Tory	Canning (Canningite–Whig)	George IV (1820–1830)
Henry Petty-Fitzmaurice; 3rd Marquess of Lansdowne	16 July 1827	22 January 1828	Whig	Canning (Canningite–Whig)	George IV (1820–1830)
Henry Petty-Fitzmaurice; 3rd Marquess of Lansdowne	16 July 1827	22 January 1828	Whig	Goderich	George IV (1820–1830)
Robert Peel; MP for 3 constituencies respectively (1788–1850)	26 January 1828	22 November 1830	Tory	Wellington–Peel	George IV (1820–1830)
Robert Peel; MP for 3 constituencies respectively (1788–1850)	26 January 1828	22 November 1830	Tory	Wellington–Peel	William IV (1830–1837)
William Lamb; 2nd Viscount Melbourne	22 November 1830	16 July 1834	Whig	Grey	William IV (1830–1837)
John Ponsonby; 1st Baron Duncannon	19 July 1834	15 November 1834	Whig	Melbourne I	William IV (1830–1837)
Arthur Wellesley; 1st Duke of Wellington	15 November 1834	15 December 1834	Tory	Wellington Caretaker	William IV (1830–1837)
Henry Goulburn; MP for Cambridge University	15 December 1834	18 April 1835	Conservative	Peel I	William IV (1830–1837)
Lord John Russell; MP for Stroud	18 April 1835	30 August 1839	Whig	Melbourne II	William IV (1830–1837)
Lord John Russell; MP for Stroud	18 April 1835	30 August 1839	Whig	Melbourne II	Victoria (1837–1901)
Constantine Phipps; 1st Marquess of Normanby	30 August 1839	30 August 1841	Whig	Melbourne II	Victoria (1837–1901)
Sir James Graham; 2nd Baronet; MP for Dorchester	6 September 1841	30 June 1846	Conservative	Peel II	Victoria (1837–1901)
Sir George Grey; 2nd Baronet MP for Devonport → North Northumberland (Note: Elected to a new constituency in the 1847 general election.)(1799–1882)	8 July 1846	23 February 1852	Whig	Russell I	Victoria (1837–1901)
Spencer Horatio Walpole; MP for Midhurst	27 February 1852	19 December 1852	Conservative	Who? Who?	Victoria (1837–1901)
Henry John Temple; 3rd Viscount Palmerston; MP for Tiverton	28 December 1852	6 February 1855	Whig	Aberdeen (Peelite–Whig)	Victoria (1837–1901)
Sir George Grey; 2nd Baronet; MP for Morpeth	8 February 1855	26 February 1858	Whig	Palmerston I	Victoria (1837–1901)
Spencer Horatio Walpole; MP for Cambridge University	26 February 1858	3 March 1859	Conservative	Derby–Disraeli II	Victoria (1837–1901)
Thomas Henry Sutton Sotheron-Estcourt; MP for North Wiltshire	3 March 1859	18 June 1859	Conservative	Derby–Disraeli II	Victoria (1837–1901)
George Cornewall Lewis; MP for Radnor	18 June 1859	25 July 1861	Liberal	Palmerston II	Victoria (1837–1901)
Sir George Grey; 2nd Baronet; MP for Morpeth	25 July 1861	28 June 1866	Liberal	Palmerston II	Victoria (1837–1901)
Sir George Grey; 2nd Baronet; MP for Morpeth	25 July 1861	28 June 1866	Liberal	Russell II	Victoria (1837–1901)
Spencer Horatio Walpole; MP for Cambridge University	6 July 1866	17 May 1867	Conservative	Derby–Disraeli III	Victoria (1837–1901)
Gathorne Gathorne-Hardy; MP for Oxford University	17 May 1867	3 December 1868	Conservative	Derby–Disraeli III	Victoria (1837–1901)
Henry Bruce; MP for Merthyr Tydfil → Renfrewshire (Note: Lost seat in the 1868 general election and elected to a new constituency in the Renfrewshire by-election.)(1815–1895)	9 December 1868	9 August 1873	Liberal	Gladstone I	Victoria (1837–1901)
Robert Lowe; MP for London University	9 August 1873	20 February 1874	Liberal	Gladstone I	Victoria (1837–1901)
R. A. Cross; MP for South West Lancashire	21 February 1874	23 April 1880	Conservative	Disraeli II	Victoria (1837–1901)
William Harcourt; MP for Derby	28 April 1880	23 June 1885	Liberal	Gladstone II	Victoria (1837–1901)
R. A. Cross; MP for Newton	24 June 1885	1 February 1886	Conservative	Salisbury I	Victoria (1837–1901)
Hugh Childers; MP for Edinburgh South	6 February 1886	25 July 1886	Liberal	Gladstone III	Victoria (1837–1901)
Henry Matthews; MP for Birmingham East	3 August 1886	15 August 1892	Conservative	Salisbury II	Victoria (1837–1901)
H. H. Asquith; MP for East Fife	18 August 1892	25 June 1895	Liberal	Gladstone IV	Victoria (1837–1901)
H. H. Asquith; MP for East Fife	18 August 1892	25 June 1895	Liberal	Rosebery	Victoria (1837–1901)
Matthew White Ridley; MP for Blackpool	29 June 1895	12 November 1900	Conservative	Salisbury (III & IV) (Con.–Lib.U.)	Victoria (1837–1901)
Charles Ritchie; MP for Croydon	12 November 1900	11 August 1902	Conservative	Salisbury (III & IV) (Con.–Lib.U.)	Victoria (1837–1901)
Charles Ritchie; MP for Croydon	12 November 1900	11 August 1902	Conservative	Salisbury (III & IV) (Con.–Lib.U.)	Edward VII (1901–1910)
Charles Ritchie; MP for Croydon	12 November 1900	11 August 1902	Conservative	Balfour	Edward VII (1901–1910)
Aretas Akers-Douglas; MP for St Augustine's	11 August 1902	5 December 1905	Conservative	Balfour	Edward VII (1901–1910)
Herbert Gladstone; MP for Leeds West	11 December 1905	19 February 1910	Liberal	Campbell-Bannerman	Edward VII (1901–1910)
Herbert Gladstone; MP for Leeds West	11 December 1905	19 February 1910	Liberal	Asquith (I–III)	Edward VII (1901–1910)
Winston Churchill; MP for Dundee	19 February 1910	24 October 1911	Liberal	Asquith (I–III)	Edward VII (1901–1910)
Winston Churchill; MP for Dundee	19 February 1910	24 October 1911	Liberal	Asquith (I–III)	George V (1910–1936)
Reginald McKenna; MP for North Monmouthshire	24 October 1911	27 May 1915	Liberal	Asquith (I–III)	George V (1910–1936)
John Simon; MP for Walthamstow	27 May 1915	12 January 1916	Liberal	Asquith Coalition (Lib.–Con.–et al.)	George V (1910–1936)
Herbert Samuel; MP for Cleveland	12 January 1916	7 December 1916	Liberal	Asquith Coalition (Lib.–Con.–et al.)	George V (1910–1936)
George Cave; 1st Viscount Cave; MP for Kingston (Note: Ennobled on the day of the 1918 election, which he did not contest.) (1856–1928)	11 December 1916	14 January 1919	Conservative	Lloyd George (I & II)	George V (1910–1936)
Edward Shortt; MP for Newcastle upon Tyne West	14 January 1919	23 October 1922	National Liberal	Lloyd George (I & II)	George V (1910–1936)
William Bridgeman; MP for Oswestry	25 October 1922	22 January 1924	Conservative	Law	George V (1910–1936)
William Bridgeman; MP for Oswestry	25 October 1922	22 January 1924	Conservative	Baldwin I	George V (1910–1936)
Arthur Henderson; MP for Burnley (Note: Elected on 28 February 1924 in the Burnley by-election.) (1863–1935)	23 January 1924	4 November 1924	Labour	MacDonald I	George V (1910–1936)
William Joynson-Hicks; MP for Twickenham	7 November 1924	5 June 1929	Conservative	Baldwin II	George V (1910–1936)
John Robert Clynes; MP for Manchester Platting	8 June 1929	26 August 1931	Labour	MacDonald II	George V (1910–1936)
Herbert Samuel; MP for Darwen	26 August 1931	1 October 1932	Liberal	National I (N.Lab.–Con.–et al.)	George V (1910–1936)
Herbert Samuel; MP for Darwen	26 August 1931	1 October 1932	Liberal	National II	George V (1910–1936)
Sir John Gilmour; 2nd Baronet; MP for Glasgow Pollok	1 October 1932	7 June 1935	Unionist	National II	George V (1910–1936)
John Simon; MP for Spen Valley	7 June 1935	28 May 1937	Liberal National	National III (Con.–N.Lab.–et al.)	George V (1910–1936)
John Simon; MP for Spen Valley	7 June 1935	28 May 1937	Liberal National	National III (Con.–N.Lab.–et al.)	Edward VIII (1936)
John Simon; MP for Spen Valley	7 June 1935	28 May 1937	Liberal National	National III (Con.–N.Lab.–et al.)	George VI (1936–1952)
Samuel Hoare; MP for Chelsea	28 May 1937	3 September 1939	Conservative	National IV	George VI (1936–1952)
John Anderson; MP for Combined Scottish Universities	4 September 1939	4 October 1940	Independent (National)	Chamberlain War	George VI (1936–1952)
John Anderson; MP for Combined Scottish Universities	4 September 1939	4 October 1940	Independent (National)	Churchill War (All parties)	George VI (1936–1952)
Herbert Morrison; MP for Hackney South	4 October 1940	23 May 1945	Labour	Churchill War (All parties)	George VI (1936–1952)
Donald Somervell; MP for Crewe	25 May 1945	26 July 1945	Conservative	Churchill Caretaker (Con.–Lib.N.)	George VI (1936–1952)
James Chuter Ede; MP for South Shields	3 August 1945	26 October 1951	Labour	Attlee (I & II)	George VI (1936–1952)
David Maxwell Fyfe; MP for Liverpool West Derby	27 October 1951	19 October 1954	Conservative	Churchill III	George VI (1936–1952)
David Maxwell Fyfe; MP for Liverpool West Derby	27 October 1951	19 October 1954	Conservative	Churchill III	Elizabeth II (1952–2022)
Gwilym Lloyd George; MP for Newcastle upon Tyne North	19 October 1954	14 January 1957	National Liberal & Conservative	Churchill III	Elizabeth II (1952–2022)
Gwilym Lloyd George; MP for Newcastle upon Tyne North	19 October 1954	14 January 1957	National Liberal & Conservative	Eden	Elizabeth II (1952–2022)
Rab Butler; MP for Saffron Walden	14 January 1957	13 July 1962	Conservative	Macmillan (I & II)	Elizabeth II (1952–2022)
Henry Brooke; MP for Hampstead	14 July 1962	16 October 1964	Conservative	Macmillan (I & II)	Elizabeth II (1952–2022)
Henry Brooke; MP for Hampstead	14 July 1962	16 October 1964	Conservative	Douglas-Home	Elizabeth II (1952–2022)
Frank Soskice; MP for Newport	18 October 1964	23 December 1965	Labour	Wilson (I & II)	Elizabeth II (1952–2022)
Roy Jenkins; MP for Birmingham Stechford	23 December 1965	30 November 1967	Labour	Wilson (I & II)	Elizabeth II (1952–2022)
James Callaghan; MP for Cardiff South East	30 November 1967	19 June 1970	Labour	Wilson (I & II)	Elizabeth II (1952–2022)
Reginald Maudling; MP for Barnet	20 June 1970	18 July 1972	Conservative	Heath	Elizabeth II (1952–2022)
Robert Carr; MP for Carshalton	18 July 1972	4 March 1974	Conservative	Heath	Elizabeth II (1952–2022)
Roy Jenkins; MP for Birmingham Stechford	5 March 1974	10 September 1976	Labour	Wilson (III & IV)	Elizabeth II (1952–2022)
Roy Jenkins; MP for Birmingham Stechford	5 March 1974	10 September 1976	Labour	Callaghan	Elizabeth II (1952–2022)
Merlyn Rees; MP for Leeds South	10 September 1976	4 May 1979	Labour	Callaghan	Elizabeth II (1952–2022)
William Whitelaw; MP for Penrith and The Border	4 May 1979	11 June 1983	Conservative	Thatcher I	Elizabeth II (1952–2022)
Leon Brittan; MP for Richmond (Yorks)	11 June 1983	2 September 1985	Conservative	Thatcher II	Elizabeth II (1952–2022)
Douglas Hurd; MP for Witney	2 September 1985	26 October 1989	Conservative	Thatcher II	Elizabeth II (1952–2022)
Douglas Hurd; MP for Witney	2 September 1985	26 October 1989	Conservative	Thatcher III	Elizabeth II (1952–2022)
David Waddington; MP for Ribble Valley	26 October 1989	28 November 1990	Conservative	Thatcher III	Elizabeth II (1952–2022)
Kenneth Baker; MP for Mole Valley	28 November 1990	10 April 1992	Conservative	Major I	Elizabeth II (1952–2022)
Kenneth Clarke; MP for Rushcliffe	10 April 1992	27 May 1993	Conservative	Major II	Elizabeth II (1952–2022)
Michael Howard; MP for Folkestone and Hythe	27 May 1993	2 May 1997	Conservative	Major II	Elizabeth II (1952–2022)
Jack Straw; MP for Blackburn	2 May 1997	8 June 2001	Labour	Blair I	Elizabeth II (1952–2022)
David Blunkett; MP for Sheffield Brightside	8 June 2001	15 December 2004	Labour	Blair II	Elizabeth II (1952–2022)
Charles Clarke; MP for Norwich South	15 December 2004	5 May 2006	Labour	Blair II	Elizabeth II (1952–2022)
Charles Clarke; MP for Norwich South	15 December 2004	5 May 2006	Labour	Blair III	Elizabeth II (1952–2022)
John Reid; MP for Airdrie and Shotts	5 May 2006	28 June 2007	Labour	Blair III	Elizabeth II (1952–2022)
Jacqui Smith; MP for Redditch	28 June 2007	5 June 2009	Labour	Brown	Elizabeth II (1952–2022)
Alan Johnson; MP for Hull West and Hessle	5 June 2009	11 May 2010	Labour	Brown	Elizabeth II (1952–2022)
Theresa May; MP for Maidenhead Tenure	12 May 2010	13 July 2016	Conservative	Cameron–Clegg (Con.–L.D.)	Elizabeth II (1952–2022)
Theresa May; MP for Maidenhead Tenure	12 May 2010	13 July 2016	Conservative	Cameron II	Elizabeth II (1952–2022)
Amber Rudd; MP for Hastings and Rye	13 July 2016	29 April 2018	Conservative	May I	Elizabeth II (1952–2022)
Amber Rudd; MP for Hastings and Rye	13 July 2016	29 April 2018	Conservative	May II	Elizabeth II (1952–2022)
Sajid Javid; MP for Bromsgrove	30 April 2018	24 July 2019	Conservative	May II	Elizabeth II (1952–2022)
Priti Patel; MP for Witham	24 July 2019	6 September 2022	Conservative	Johnson I	Elizabeth II (1952–2022)
Priti Patel; MP for Witham	24 July 2019	6 September 2022	Conservative	Johnson II	Elizabeth II (1952–2022)
Suella Braverman; MP for Fareham	6 September 2022	19 October 2022	Conservative	Truss	Elizabeth II (1952–2022)
Suella Braverman; MP for Fareham	6 September 2022	19 October 2022	Conservative	Truss	Charles III (2022–present)
Grant Shapps; MP for Welwyn Hatfield	19 October 2022	25 October 2022	Conservative	Truss	Charles III (2022–present)
Suella Braverman; MP for Fareham	25 October 2022	13 November 2023	Conservative	Sunak	Charles III (2022–present)
James Cleverly; MP for Braintree	13 November 2023	5 July 2024	Conservative	Sunak	Charles III (2022–present)
Yvette Cooper; MP for Pontefract, Castleford and Knottingley	5 July 2024	5 September 2025	Labour	Starmer	Charles III (2022–present)
Shabana Mahmood; MP for Birmingham Ladywood	5 September 2025	Incumbent (Note: Mahmood remained in office upon the formation of the Burnham ministry, being reappointed by Prime Minister Andy Burnham on 20 July 2026.)	Labour	Starmer	Charles III (2022–present)
Shabana Mahmood; MP for Birmingham Ladywood	5 September 2025	Incumbent	Labour	Burnham	Charles III (2022–present)

== See also ==
- British government departments
- Cabinet (government)
- Great Offices of State
- Interior minister
- List of British governments
- List of current interior ministers
- List of permanent under secretaries of state of the Home Office
- Ministry of Justice
- Shadow Home Secretary
- Home Office under Theresa May
- Under Secretary of State for the Home Department
