= Edward Maitland, Lord Barcaple =

Scottish advocate and judge (1803–1870)

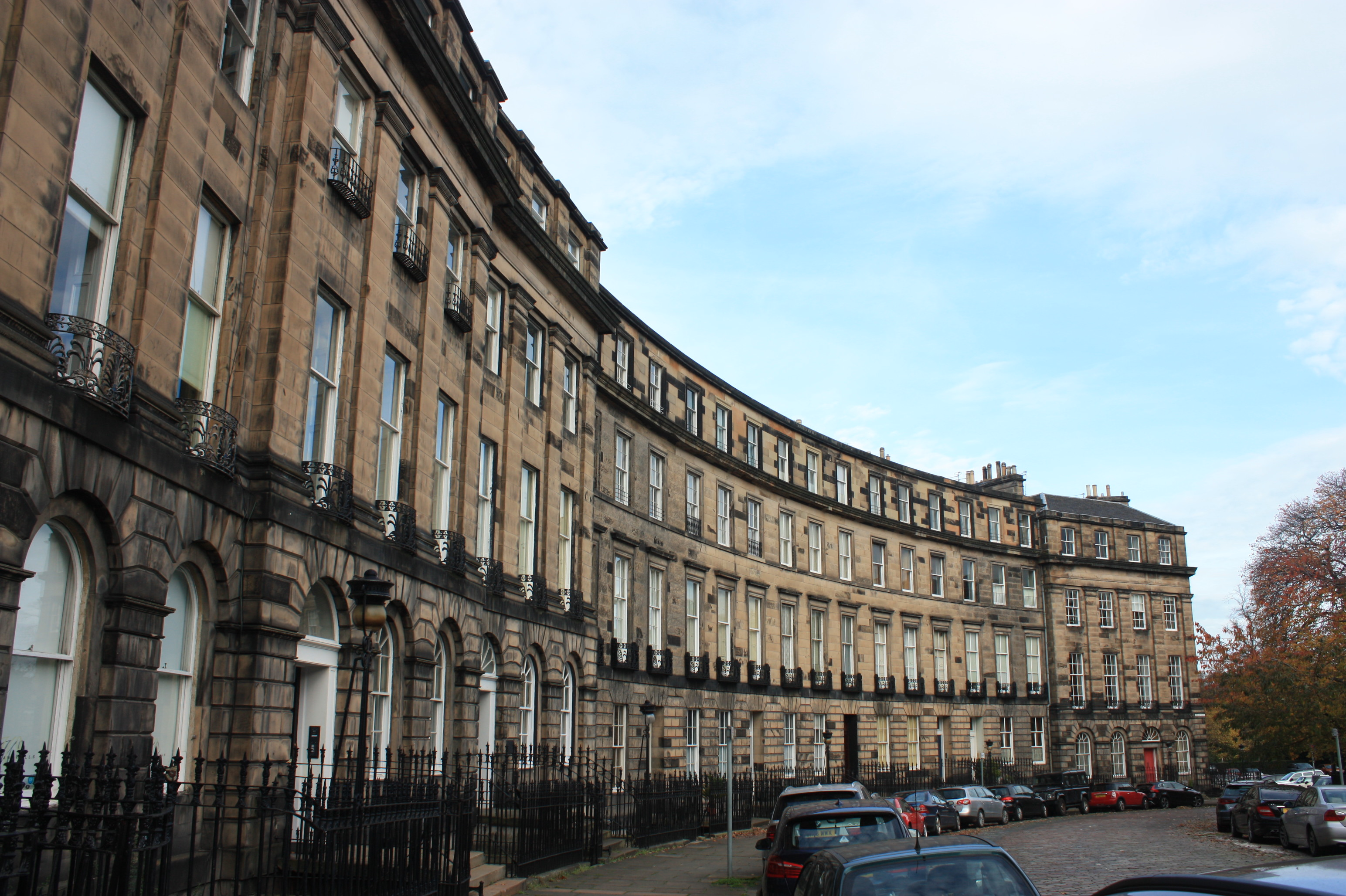
Ainslie Place in Edinburgh

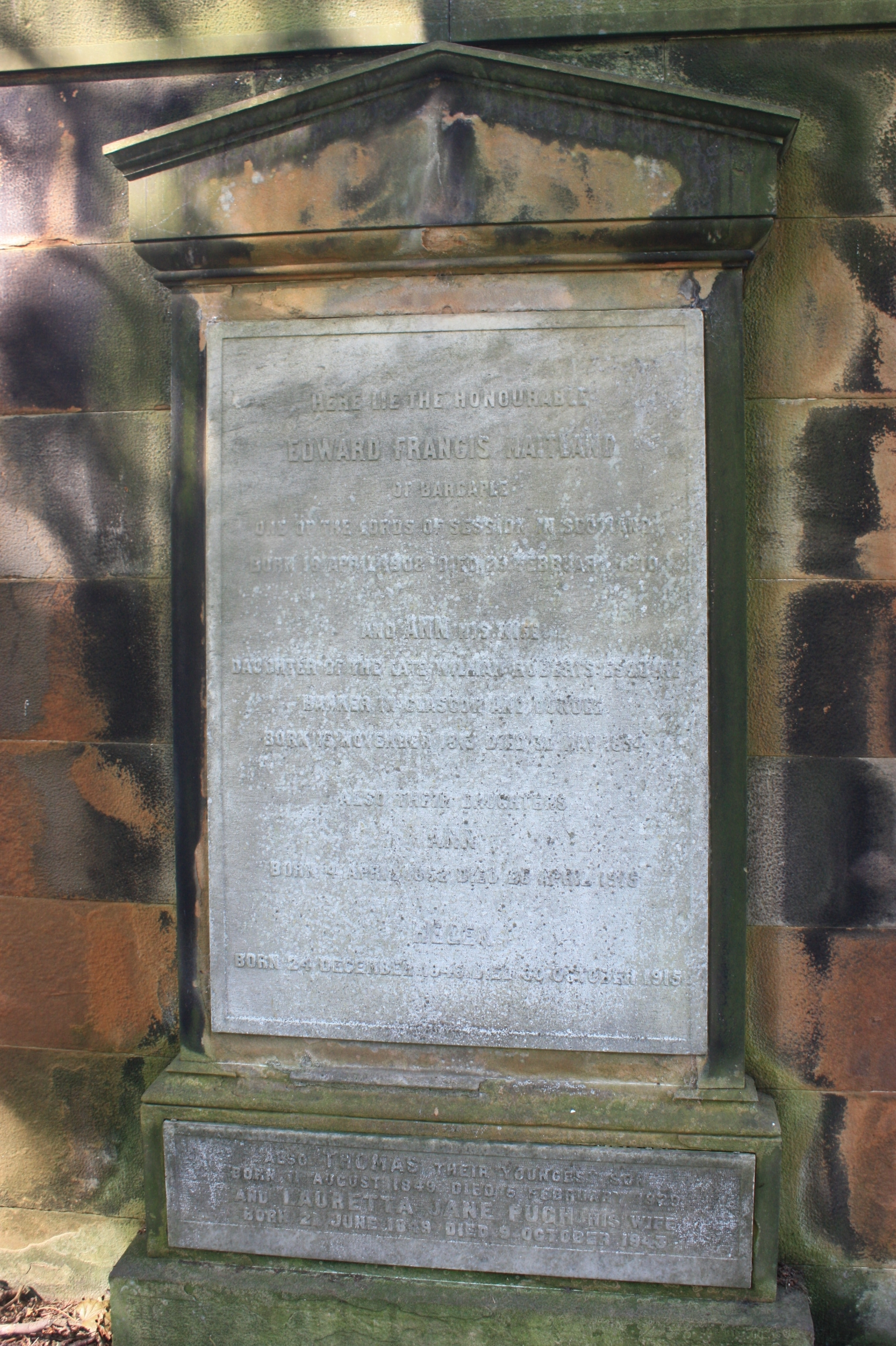
Lord Barcaple's grave, Dean Cemetery

Edward Francis Maitland, Lord Barcaple FRSE LLD (1803–1870) was a Scottish advocate and judge and Senator of the College of Justice.

== Life ==
He was born at 36 George Square in Edinburgh on 16 April 1808, the son of Adam Maitland of Dundrennan. He was educated at the High School in Edinburgh then studied law at the University of Edinburgh, graduating with an MA.

The brother of Thomas Maitland, Lord Dundrennan, he became an advocate in 1831, and served in government as Solicitor General for Scotland from 1855–1858 and from 1859–1862. He was appointed a Lord of Session, with the judicial title Lord Barcaple, in 1862. In the same year he was elected a Fellow of the Royal Society of Edinburgh his proposer was James Thomson Gibson-Craig.

He served as Sheriff of Argyllshire from 9 July 1851, until becoming solicitor-general for Scotland under Lord Palmerston from 14 February 1855 to 17 March 1858, and from 27 June 1859 to 10 November 1862.

As a lord of the court of session, with the title of Lord Barcaple, he sat on the bench from 10 November 1862 till his death. He was curator and assessor of the University of Edinburgh in 1859, and rector of the University of Aberdeen in 1860. The University of Edinburgh awarded him an honorary doctorate (LLD) in later life.

He died at 3 Ainslie Place, on the Moray Estate in west Edinburgh, on 23 February 1870. He is buried on the north wall of Dean Cemetery adjacent to the central gap leading to the north extension.

== Family ==
In 1840, he married Emily Roberts (1813–1854) a daughter of William Roberts, a Glasgow banker.

They had daughters Ann Maitland (1852–1915) and Helen (1846–1915) and a son Thomas (1849–1929).

== Arms ==
Coat of arms of Edward Maitland, Lord Barcaple

Crest
A demi-monk vested Grey holding in the dexter hand a crucifix Argent in the sinister a rosary Proper.
Escutcheon
Quarterly 1st & 4th a lion rampant dechanssé within a bordure embattled Gules 2nd & 3rd the ruins of an old abbey on a piece of ground Proper.
Motto
Esse Quam Videri

Legal offices
Preceded by Thomas Mackenzie	Solicitor General for Scotland; 1855–1858	Succeeded by Charles Baillie
Preceded by George Patton	Solicitor General for Scotland; 1859–1862	Succeeded by George Young
Academic offices
New university	Rector of the University of Aberdeen; 1860–1863	Succeeded by Earl Russell
