= Clerk Marshal =

Official of the British Royal Household

The Clerk Marshal (also spelled Clerk Martial) was an official of the British Royal Household in the department of the Master of the Horse. From the Restoration the office was held with that of Avenor until the latter post was abolished in 1793. The office of Clerk Marshal was then combined with that of First or Chief Equerry until 1874. From 1841 the holder was a member of the Government, but the office ceased to be a political one from 1866.

The duties of the Clerk Marshal were to swear in the officers of the Master of the Horse's department, and for the payment of all officers and servants. He was also responsible for submitting the accounts of the department to the Board of Green Cloth. Clerks Marshal were appointed in the households of other members of the Royal Family as well.

== List of Clerks Marshal ==
=== to Charles II ===
- 8 June 1660: George Barker
- 18 August 1660: Richard Mason
- 10 September 1671: Joseph Cragg

=== to James II ===
- 21 April 1685: Thomas Morley

=== to William III and Mary II ===
- 10 April 1688: William Ryder
- 12 March 1689: Anthony Rowe
- 27 April 1694: John Latton

=== to Anne ===
- 23 June 1702: Hugh Chudleigh
- 6 November 1707: Thomas Lister
- 12 June 1711: Conyers Darcy

=== to George I ===
- 29 September 1714: Conyers Darcy
- 10 June 1717: Francis Negus

=== to George II ===
- 20 June 1727: Francis Negus
- 9 September 1732: vacant
- 22 April 1734: James Lumley
- 11 March 1741: Edmund Charles Blomberg
- 8 November 1757: Courthorpe Clayton

=== to George III ===
- 15 December 1760: Timothy Carr
- 6 April 1771: Benjamin Carpenter (Chief Equerry from 1 January 1783)
- 9 March 1788: Philip Goldsworthy
- 6 January 1801: Robert Manners

=== to the Prince Regent, later George IV ===
- 24 March 1812: Benjamin Bloomfield (knighted 1815)
- 25 August 1817: Francis Thomas Hammond (knighted 1819)

=== to William IV ===
- 16 July 1830: Sir Andrew Francis Barnard

=== to Queen Adelaide ===
- 2 January 1846: Sir Andrew Francis Barnard

=== to Queen Victoria ===
- 20 July 1837: Henry Frederick Compton Cavendish
- 10 September 1841: Lord Charles Wellesley
- 7 July 1846: Lord Alfred Paget
- 28 February 1852: Charles John Colville, 1st Viscount Colville of Culross
- 30 December 1852: Lord Alfred Paget
- 26 February 1858: Lord Colville of Culross
- 1 July 1859: Lord Alfred Paget (held office until 1892)

=== to Prince Albert ===
- 2 January 1842: William Wemyss
- 8 March 1853: Alexander Nelson Hood

=== to Edward VII ===
- 1 January 1904: Sir Stanley Calvert Clarke (also Chief Equerry until 9 October 1908)
