= John Bedford Leno =

English author, radical and publisher

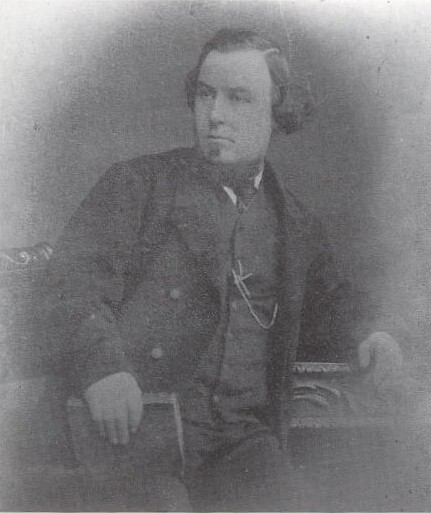
- Born: 29 June 1826; Uxbridge, Middlesex, England
- Died: 31 October 1894 (aged 68); Uxbridge, Middlesex, England
- Occupations: Printer, Poet, Songwriter, Author, Publisher & Radical
- Known for: Reform League, Reform Act 1867
- Notable work: "The Song of the Spade", "King Labour"

John Bedford Leno (29 June 1826 – 31 October 1894) was a Chartist, radical, poet, and printer who acted as a "bridge" between Chartism and early Labour movements, as well as between the working and ruling classes. He campaigned to give the vote to all common men and women, driven by a strong desire for "justice and freedom for all mankind". He was a leading figure in the Reform League, which campaigned for the Reform Act 1867. He was called the "Burns of Labour" and "the poet of the poor" for his political songs and poems, which were sold widely in penny publications, and recited and sung by workers in Britain, Europe and America. He was an entertaining and persuasive orator and his speeches were in great demand around London. He owned, edited and contributed to Radical and Liberal newspapers and journals, and printed and distributed bills advertising London Reform meetings and demonstrations. He wrote the international hit 'The Song of the Spade'.

== Roots ==
John Bedford Leno was born on 29 June 1826 at 14 Bell Yard, Uxbridge, Middlesex, England. He was the eldest child of John Leno (1800–1885) (Gentleman's footman, baker and publican) and Phoebe Bedford (1801–1875) (lady's maid, needlewoman & teacher in a Dame's school) who met whilst working for Mr. Chippendale, a well known Uxbridge philanthropist.

== Early years ==
Although not well educated, John Bedford Leno's mother taught him to read and it is to her he attributed his love of learning. He was sent to preparatory school at the age of eight but was quickly expelled on the grounds of telling a falsehood. He maintained that this was untrue. He suspected that the lie had been fabricated by a few of the better off scholars who found out that he hailed from Bell Yard, and thought it degrading to have to associate with someone of such poor standing.

He was then sent to live with his aunt at Stanwell Moor. She was in charge of the parish poor house, along with her husband, in which they had apartments. He found the workhouse a "queer" place. In a strange twist of fate he next worked as a cleaner and errand boy at the very same school he had been expelled from. At the age of twelve he worked for a firework maker whom he disliked for making false marketing claims and building sub-standard squibs.

He became a rural postboy under the Uxbridge post master, who was also a printer and stationer. John Bedford Leno delivered to the Uxbridge Common, Ickenham, Ruislip and Eastcote areas, walking twenty miles every day, from 6am to dinner time before returning to finish off the day with some print work. It is during his time as postboy that his theatrical interest was aroused; he was often called upon to read out the contents of letters to the villagers, many of whom were illiterate. He found that he had the power to "create smiles and draw forth tears" and found this very satisfying.

This lasted for twelve months before he became so useful in the print office that he was enrolled as a printer's apprentice. Due to his incomplete education he struggled for three years and made little progress. Despite this, he persevered and was given extra instruction after work by the most able, and benevolent, printer in the office called Mr. Kingsbury, who he felt indebted to for the rest of his life.

== Theatre, singing, poetry & gambling ==
During this time, Uxbridge was regularly visited by theatre groups and John Bedford Leno watched numerous actors perform with admiration. When one of the visiting theatre companies hit some bad luck, and was on the verge of bankruptcy, John Bedford Leno was spurred into action. Despite never having acted before, he and three friends decided to put on an amateur performance of Roundheads and Cavaliers, with the proceeds going to the manager of the impoverished theatre company. John Bedford Leno played the lead character and also arranged for billings to be distributed around the town. The identities of the actors were not revealed and rumours were circulated that they were persons of "the highest social position". The performance was a sell out and was followed by one of the bankrupt theatre company's own plays. This proved so successful that it then played in Uxbridge for the next nine months and saved the company from ruin. The manager of the company later became wealthy and attributed much of his success to John Bedford Leno and his three enterprising friends.

John Bedford Leno's father bought a malthouse with an inheritance gained from his recently deceased brother, Mathew Leno, who had won the grand prize in a government lottery a few years earlier. John Bedford Leno had bad memories of this place and some of the rogues that filled it. He was often called upon to sing to customers, having a good voice, and to take part in singing competitions which he usually won. However, his interest in poetry was sparked here by a customer leaving a copy of Lives of The Poets by Samuel Johnson. John Bedford Leno read and re-read it and decided to become a poet.

== Introduction to politics ==
John Bedford Leno was also introduced to politics at his father's malthouse. He became friends with a Chartist, Fred Farrell, who used to argue about various theories with Mr. Kingsbury, from the print office, who was a conventional Liberal. He was introduced to The Examiner newspaper, Star, New Moral World and other various publications and could soon hold his own in arguments about one tenet or another.

He became converted to Chartism and joined at the first opportunity. He formed a branch in his home town and became its branch secretary, buying and selling Chartist publications to the residents of Uxbridge.

== Printing ==
Towards the end of his apprenticeship John Bedford Leno grew to be more competent than some of his more qualified colleagues and became office foreman. After seven years he finished his apprenticeship but parted ways with his employer due largely to the financial difficulties of the business and ensuing tensions between the two of them. He found work in another printing works in Eton, Berkshire for a while before again being released due to tensions with his foreman (JBL was quick-witted and had a strong sense of justice which, when combined with an exploitative or dishonest employer, landed him in trouble). Printing was suffering a slump and so John Bedford Leno decided his best chance of employment was to be found in the country. He travelled far and wide, surviving by singing and reciting poetry in exchange for food or money and travelled over a thousand miles around the country before deciding to head back to Uxbridge. Upon his return he was persuaded to hold a Benefit Concert for himself at the town hall, which he did and raised £40. He bought himself his own printing press and set up shop in Windsor St, Uxbridge.

== Chartism ==
As well as founding the Uxbridge Chartist branch John Bedford Leno also daringly established the Eton branch in Windsor which was the home of Queen Victoria. He also served as a Delegate of the Chartist movement.

His first publication was the Manuscript Newspaper, of which he was co-editor. This was then succeeded by the Uxbridge Pioneer which was edited by Gerald Massey, Kimber, Hudson, Gurney and a few others who had all been elected by the Uxbridge Young Men's Improvement Society. Political differences soon caused a split in this group and John Bedford Leno and Gerald Massey went on to produce their own paper: Spirit of Freedom, and Working Man's Vindicator. This was printed for the next year until Massey left Uxbridge to work as the secretary for the Tailor's Association in London. Here Gerald met the "Promoters", a body of gentleman who were known as Christian Socialists (now known as the Christian Socialist Movement) and included many eminent men. They decided to set up a Working Printers' Association which they invited John Bedford Leno to take charge of. He declined however, on the grounds that they would be setting up in opposition to some of his old friends who had just set up their own "Co-operative Printers' Association" in London, which he joined as a rank and file printer. When their existence became known to the heads of the Christian Socialists, they received considerable financial support, from the likes of Frederick Maurice and Thomas Hughes, the author of Tom Brown's Schooldays. The "Co-operative Printers' Association" disbanded after three years and John Bedford Leno set up his own printing shop in Drury Lane, London in which he lived with his family for most of the rest of his life.

One of John Bedford Leno's first London experiences was attending the Chartist rally at Clerkenwell Green in 1848. This was disbanded by an army of police constables who swept the green. When asked to disperse by a plain clothes policeman John Bedford Leno at first refused, whereupon he was battered in the face with a truncheon.

== International Socialism ==
In 1848 John Bedford Leno joined the First International [this is not correct First International formed Sep. 28, 1864], which had been started by his friend, George Julian Harney [??? needs a source]. He attended International Meetings (the first international) at Jacques, a café kept by a French exile in Chapel St. just off of Oxford Street, London.

After one such meeting he was approached by the Russian revolutionary, Alexander Herzen, who inquired whether he would mind running an underground printing office for him. It would be used to print leaflets which were to be used to flood Russia with revolutionary literature. John Bedford Leno eagerly agreed and they arranged to meet again. Herzen never showed up and it seems he had been forced to flee, later being caught and thrown into prison in Siberia.

John Bedford Leno met Karl Marx several times while he was in London. After a public meeting of the Reform League in 1855 an impromptu committee meeting was held in the parlour of a tavern in Chancery Lane. Here John Bedford Leno reminisced about conversing with the Russian who he found to "be deeply interested, a firm believer in the doctrines and who never ceased to advocate".

When Napoleon III visited England in 1858 Leno arranged for an "appropriate welcome" to be made. Leno had a hatred of Napoleon because of his "betrayal of the French Republic" (Napoleon became Emperor of the French after a coup in 1851), and believed he was no friend of England. This view was shared by other Chartists, Lord John Russell, Gladstone and John Bright. Leno printed 10,000 leaflets advertising Napoleon's visit and called for demonstrations at Cheapside and Long Acre. The French refugees in London responded in great numbers, wanting revenge for their expatriation. Napoleon was the main subject of debate in London debating halls at this time and it was in one of these that Leno gave a speech arguing for regicide in certain circumstances i.e., when a monarch used a nation's troops for their own or unconstitutional ends, as Napoleon had done.

John Bedford Leno was also a Delegate of the International and a member of the committee appointed to meet Lajos Kossuth in 1851 and Giuseppe Garibaldi in 1864, the Hungarian and Italian revolutionaries.

== Post-Chartism ==
He spent much time attending meetings, making speeches, giving council or writing political articles or songs during this period. He was a regular contributor to the weekly journal the Christian Socialist and served as a representative to the Christian Socialists.

Jones offered to pay Leno to join him in his battle against Harney for leadership of the Chartist movement. However, Leno declined, having just started his own group (known as the Propagandists who pledged to speak on behalf of the working class, free of pay). They met weekly to hold discussions at the "Windsor Castle", Holborn and leading members included George Odger, William Randal Cremer, George Howell, Robert Applegarth, William Davis & John Henriette.

Most of the Propagandists joined the Universal League for the Material Elevation of the Industrious Classes in 1863, of which Leno was made chairman. It was from the nucleus of this group that the Reform League was formed in 1865.

== The Reform League and the Reform Act 1867 ==
When the Reform League was established to press for manhood suffrage and the ballot, John Bedford Leno was elected a member of its council almost unanimously. The Reform League was the successor of Chartism and achieved much success unlike its predecessor.

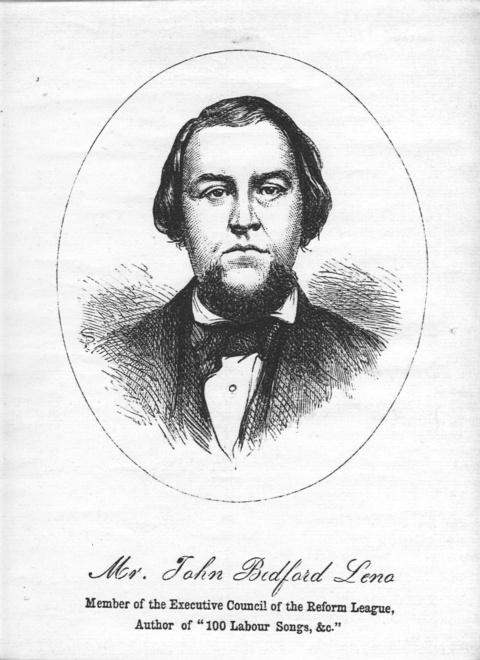
John Bedford Leno aged 40

== Hyde Park demonstration ==
At the height of the Reform League's popularity it arranged for a meeting to be held at Hyde Park. The authorities declared it to be illegal but the Reform League thought otherwise and was determined it should be held.

The procession started off from the Reform League's headquarters, at 8 Adelphi Terrace, headed by a cab containing the Reform League's president, Edmond Beales, his friend Colonel Dickson and a few other aristocratic supporters. As they headed up Regent Street it was decided that these gentlemen would visit Gunter's Tea Shop in Berkeley Square and so left the procession.

This left John Bedford Leno, his brother and a few others, at the head of the procession. When they reached Marble Arch they were confronted by a line of policemen. They demanded to be let through, but were refused, and so signified their intention to break through the line. This they tried, only to be laughed at. While arguing with the police, Leno's friend, Humphreys, noticed that the railings would stand no pressure and began to sway them backwards and forwards. He was soon helped by the masses and the railings fell. The people flooded into Hyde Park despite the efforts of the police to restrain them.

Simultaneously, two other parts of the demonstration also broke into the park; one from Knightsbridge headed by Charles Bradlaugh, and another from Park Lane.

The meeting then proceeded as planned under the Reformer's Tree. At its end it was decided to hold another meeting the next evening in Trafalgar Square. Leno and the leaders of the Reform League heard a rumour that the government was determined to oppose it and so decided to confront the Home Secretary, Walpole. They pointed out to him that if the police or military stepped in bloodshed would ensue. With tears in his eyes Walpole agreed that restraint was the best option. Leno and George Odger went back to the crowds and announced the next evening's meeting at Trafalgar Square. The crowds dispersed and the police and military held back, out of sight, and the meeting passed without violence.

The next evening's meeting at Trafalgar Square was chaired by Leno and was also peaceful.

== A Second English Civil War ==
Gustave Paul Cluseret fled Ireland and arrived in London just after the Reform League's Hyde Park demonstration in 1867. He met a dozen members of the Reform League, including John Bedford Leno, in a private room of the "White Horse" in Rathbone Place. He proposed that they create civil war in England and offered the service of two thousand sworn members of the Fenian body, and that he would act as their leader.

John Bedford Leno was the first to reply and denounced the proposal, stating that it would surely lead to their "discomfiture and transportation", and added that the government would surely hear of the plot. During subsequent speeches Leno noticed that only a matchboard partition divided the room they occupied, with another adjoining room, and that voices could be heard on the other side. Leno declared his intention to leave at once, the others agreed, and the room was soon cleared. The next day the meeting was fully reported in The Times, although Leno's speech had been attributed to George Odger, who had in fact supported Cluseret's proposal. Leno concluded that there had been a leak and that the traitor had been none other than Robert Hartwell, the editor of The Bee-Hive journal.

John Bedford Leno was fully satisfied with the success of the Reform League and, being opposed to unnecessary violence, bitterly opposed the interference of Cluseret, as did most of the other members of the Reform League. Cluseret's "call to arms" was rejected and he left England for Paris to start his War of the Commune.

== Working class Liberal ==
In 1868 John Bedford Leno and William Worley helped Gladstone and the Liberal party assess which boroughs would have strong support for working class Liberal candidates. They visited thirty-three boroughs in all. The Liberal Whip thanked them in a letter stating that "none had gauged events with equal accuracy". At the time of the General Election Leno was rewarded by being chosen as the parliamentary agent of the former secretary of the Reform League, George Howell, in the Aylesbury division. Unfortunately, they were faced by millionaire bankers, John Abel Smith and Lionel de Rothschild, who could afford to transport all of their voters to the poll, and Howell lost by two hundred votes.

John Bedford Leno also strove hard for the abolition of liability of the goods of poor tenants for rent, for limited liability with regard to investments, for the spread of education, for the abolition of drunkenness, although he was not an abstainer, and rushed to the assistance of Joseph Arch in his support for the agricultural labourer in 1872.

He thought there was justice underlying Socialism, but felt that it was coming piecemeal and that its advocates were too eager.

Whenever it was thought advisable to send deputations on questions affecting the working classes he was generally chosen, and so would meet with Palmerston, Disraeli, Derby and Gladstone. He was intimate with almost all of the working class leaders of the day and stood in the foremost rank of those selected as future working class members of the British House of Commons, although he never took up this post.

== Publishing ==
Throughout his adult life Leno published a wide variety of literature. As well as political matter he published trade journals (his handbook of shoemaking became the definitive cobblers book for the next seventy years), newspapers (he set up the first newspaper in Westminster) and non-fiction books such as The History of Temple Bar.

It was for his poems and songs, however, that he was best known, and was most proud of. He reminisced that Ernest Jones had once said to him "Do you think, Leno, that a writer of lyrics could ever acquire a big reputation?". Leno's "Song of the Spade" was published in most European languages, to at least four different tunes, in Europe and America, and was proclaimed by the Athenaeum as "being one of the best songs we possess", as well as giving him the title of the "Burns of Labour".

His admirers included Gladstone, Thornton Hunt and William Morris amongst others.

== Demise ==
In his sixties his health slowly declined, including his voice which he had used to such a great effect in singing and oration. He suffered from gout, which sometimes limited his mobility. His eldest son died in 1882, followed by his wife Sarah (née. Thrift) in 1886 and then his eldest daughter.

He wrote an autobiography which was published with a collection of his poems in 1892 and was called The Aftermath with Autobiography of the Author.

In late 1892 he was incapacitated from work by paralysis and received financial support from William Randal Cremer M.P., William Bowen Rowlands and several other members of Parliament. In 1893 he was granted a gratuity of £50 from the Royal Bounty by Prime Minister Gladstone.

He spent the last two years of his life in Windsor St, Uxbridge where he died on 31 October 1894, aged 68. He was buried at Hillingdon parish church and was survived by one son and three daughters.

== Songs ==
"Mr. Leno is a working man to the backbone. He believes in the honour and dignity of labour, and sings while he toils in a right royal spirit. He is a Radical, but a poetic Radical, which is being a Radical with a difference." – Birmingham Daily Gazette, 9 January 1868

"Drury Lane Lyrics show keen relish for eternal beauty and deep sympathy with human nature under various circumstances." – Athenaeum, 28 March 1868

"Mr. Leno's 'Lyrics' are on the side of labour and struggling humanity, and will serve in no small degree to cheer the working man" – Falmouth and Penryn Weekly Times, 11 January 1868

=== The Song of the Spade ===
His most popular song.

"We are not surprised that so spirit-stirring a song should find a home on the other side of the Atlantic; indeed, it is as well known there as in the author's native land. We may here add that the Chevalier de Chatelaine, the able French translator of Chaucer and Shakespeare, has not deemed this song of Mr. Leno's beneath his dignity; for he has rendered it familiar to his countrymen in a translation of uncommon excellence." – Woolwich Gazette, 18 January 1868

Give me the spade, and the man who can use it,
A fig for your Lord and his soft silken hand;
Let the man who has strength never stop to abuse it,
Give it back to the giver – the land, boys, the land!
There's no bank like the earth to deposit your labour,
The more you deposit, the more you shall have;
If there's more than you can give to your neighbour,
And your name shall be dear to the true and the brave.

Give me the spade! England's hope, England's glory!
That fashioned the field from the bleak barren moor.
Let us blazon its rare deeds in ballad and story,
While 'tis brightened with labour – not tarnished with gore.
It was not the sword that won our last battle,
Created our commerce – extended our trade, –
Gave food to our loving wives children, and cattle,
But the queen of all weapons – the spade, boys, the spade.

Give me the spade! There's a magic about it
That turns the black soil into bright shining gold,
What would our fathers have done, boys, without it, –
When the land lay all bare, and the night winds blew cold?
Where the tall forest stood, and the wild beasts were yelling,
And our stout-hearted ancestors shrank back afraid, –
The rich corn-stack is raised, and man claims a dwelling,
Then hurrah! for our true friend – the spade, boys, the spade!

=== Judge not a Man ===
"The Music is melodious and facile – the Words straight forward and sensible, such as we should be glad to see more frequently wedded to sweet Music – and is likely to prove a favourite" – The Sunday Times, October 1857

Judge not a man by the cost of his clothing,
Unheeding the life-path that he may pursue,
Or oft you'll admire a heart that needs loathing,
And fail to give honour where honour is due.
The palm may be hard, the fingers stiff jointed, –
The coat may be tattered, the cheek worn with tears;
But greater than kings are labour's anointed!
You can't judge a man by the coat that he wears.

Give me the man as a friend and a neighbour
Who toils at the loom – with the spade – or the plough;
Who wins his diploma of manhood by labour,
And purchases wealth by the sweat of his brow.
Why should the broad cloth alone be respected –
The man be despised who in fustian appears?
The angels in heaven have their limbs unprotected!
Then why judge a man by the coat that he wears.

Judge a man by the work he is doing,
Speak of a man as his actions demand;
Watch well the life that each is pursuing,
And let the most worthy be chief of the land,
That man shall be found midst the close ranks of labour,
Be known by the work that his industry rears;
His chiefdom when worn shall be dear to his neighbour,
We'll honour the man whatever he wears!

== Poems ==
"Mr. Leno is, beyond all question, the poet of the poor. His language consists of the choicest Saxon, and his thoughts are the every day thoughts of the great mass of his countrymen, sublimated by a rich and vigorous fancy. He is the very antithesis of the modern poet, and as such, objects to the use of all glitter and tinsel. What Ebeneezer Elliott was to the principles of Free Trade in Corn, John Bedford Leno is to the more enduring theme of Labour – Equally strong, plain, and uncompromising" – Woolwich Gazette, 18 January 1868

=== King Labour ===
The Wizard, King Labour, walked over the land,
And the spade for a sceptre he bore;
And each step he took left an Eden behind,
While the desert untamed frowned before.
He levelled huge mountains, and blasted the rocks,
Where for ages vast treasures lay hid;
And shewed Heaven the coffer where Earth stored her wealth,
And laughed loud as he shattered the lid.

I marked every step the magic king took,
Till he bounded the wide spreading plain,
And I marked how the eye of God followed his path
While the heavens sang a gladsome refrain,
And this was its burthen – "There's plenty for all,
Look abroad in the light of the day,
And view the corn challenge the sickel and scythe,
With its lances well poised for the fray."

The harvest well-garnered-Toils heralds went forth,
Their speed by Good-Humour increased,
And they said to each child of the universe, "Come!
And let none be shut out from the feast!"
"Come, come" said King Labour, "Earth's treasures are mine,
Bid the tyrants of earth to beware;
Their bride may be Death, if they court Famine's hand,
For still there's the Sword of Despair."

=== Sample titles of other poems ===
- England's Glory
- Liberty
- My Father's Sword
- Up, Brothers, Up
- Freedom's Day
- There's Plenty For All
- Toil On, Toil On
- Song of the Slopworker
- What Is Labour
- A Harvest Song
- The Weaver's Song
- The Shoemaker's Linnet
- The Injured Peasant
- Ben The Miner
- Give Me A Thousand Warriors
- The Ostler's Song
- Gather Ye, Gather Ye
- The Last Idler
- A Modern Inferno
- The World Is Moving

== Bibliography (books & essays) ==
- 1853 Herne's Oak; and other miscellaneous poems – published by W. Freeman, London
- 1857 King Labour's Song-Book
- 1861 An Essay on the Nine Hours Movement – published London
- 1863 Female Labour – published by Farrah and Dunbar, London
- 1864 Muscular Poetry or Songs for the Toilers – published by Farrah and Dunbar, London
- 1865 Penny Pamphlet on life and times of Lord Palmerstone
- 1866/7 The Reformers Book of Songs – published by The Commonwealth, London
- 1868 Drury Lane Lyrics And Other Poems – published by J.B. Leno, London
- 1874 The History of Temple Bar, the City Golgotha – published under the pseudonym of J.BONEL which is J.B and then LENO backwards)
- 1885 The Art of Boot and Shoemaking: A Practical Handbook – reprinted 1895, 1915 and 1949
- 1889 The Last Idler and Other Poems – published by Reeves & Turner, London
- 1889 Kimburton A Story of Village Life – published by J.B. Leno, London
- 1892 The Aftermath with Autobiography of the Author – published by Reeves & Turner, London

== Bibliography (newspapers & journals) ==
- 184x Manuscript newspaper – Co-Editor
- 1846 Attempt newspaper
- 1849 Uxbridge Pioneer
- 1849 Uxbridge Spirit of Freedom, and Working Man's Vindicator – Co-Editor & Contributor
- 185x Christian Socialist journal – Contributor
- 185x Commonwealth newspaper – Editor
- 1858 National Union: A Political and Social Record – Contributor
- 1861 The Poetic Magazine – Editor & Contributor
- 1865 Miner and Workman’s Advocate paper – Proprietor
- 1869 St. Crispin boot and shoemaker and leather trades journal – Owner & Editor
- 18?? Westminster News newspaper – Owner
- 1881 The Anti-Tithe journal – Editor
- 1890 Commonweal Liberal newspaper (not the same as the Commonwealth newspaper) – Contributor

== Political career ==
- 184x Founder & Branch Secretary of Uxbridge Chartists
- 184x Founder & Branch Secretary of Eton Chartists
- 1851 Member of committee appointed to meet Lajos Kossuth
- 185x Chartist Delegate
- 185x Christian Socialist Representative
- 185x Founder of The Propagandists
- 1863 Chairman of the Universal League for the Material Elevation of the Industrious Classes
- 1864 Member of committee appointed to meet Giuseppe Garibaldi
- 1865 Member of the Executive Committee of the Reform League
- 1868 Liberal Party election agent
- 1870 Director of Adelphi Permanent Building Society
