= Lothian Sheffield Dickson =

British Army officer and campaigner (1806–1894)

Lieutenant-Colonel Lothian Sheffield Dickson (1806 – 1894) was an English soldier and a prominent member of the Reform League who took part in demonstrations that formed the background to the passing of the Reform Act 1867.

Dickson attended the Royal Military College, Sandhurst, and joined the British Army in 1824. He served in India, and during the Carlist Wars in Spain, was commander of the 7th Regiment of the British Auxiliary Legion. He joined the Tower Hamlets militia in 1846 as a major, and was promoted to lieutenant-colonel in 1855, but was demoted in 1858 without any public explanation being given.

Dickson stood unsuccessfully as a Conservative for Norwich alongside the son of the Duke of Wellington. He stood unsuccessfully as a Radical for Marylebone in 1859 general election.

During the 1850s and 1860s, Dickson was active in the campaign for manhood suffrage, working closely with Edmond Beales. He was elected to the executive of the Reform League, and served as vice-president of its general council. He also spoke widely in support of the Paris Commune. He stood again for Parliament in Hackney at the 1868 United Kingdom general election, but was once more defeated.
