= The Bee-Hive (journal) =

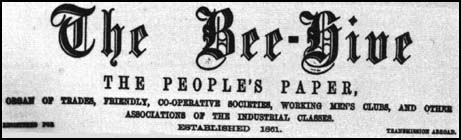
Headline of the Bee-Hive for 20 May 1871

The Bee-Hive was a trade unionist journal published weekly in the United Kingdom between 1861 and 1878.

The Bee-Hive was established in 1861 by George Potter, with professional journalist George Troup as editor and Robert Hartwell as the main contributor. Cooperative Society activist Lloyd Jones was a leader writer for the Bee-hive. It advocated strike action and supported the New Model Trade Unions of the 1860s and had been set up to support the builders' struggle which had started in 1858. It was swiftly adopted as the official journal of the London Trades Council (LTC), but by 1862 only had a circulation of 2700, and had led to Potter accumulating debts of £827.

Some members of the LTC complained that the Bee-Hive gave its support too unreservedly to strike action, with Robert Applegarth accusing Potter of being a "manufacturer of strikes". Potter defended the policy by arguing that each strike had been judged as necessary by a trade union, and therefore deserved the full support of the Bee-Hive.

The support of London labour groups was split between the London Trades Council leadership (known as the Junta) and Potter's supporters who feuded furiously. In particular there was great animosity between George Howell and Potter which resulted in the exclusion of supporters of the Bee-Hive from the early meetings of the Reform League and frequent outbursts in the Bee-Hive against the Reform League and Howell. Howell wrote about Potter and Hartwell in a letter to Edmond Beales:-

"They live on slander and falsehood. They slandered good Mr. Lincoln. They slandered Mr. Gladstone. They have inserted the Trade slanders against Mr. Bright. In fact, who have they not slandered? I leave them in contempt and disgust."

Beales became exasperated by the disruptive effect the scurrilous attacks were having on the Reform movement and resented the need to refute Hartwell's misrepresentation of the facts. Applegarth lead an investigation into the Bee-Hive's reporting in 1865, and accused Potter of personal dishonesty and maladministration regarding the journal's coverage of an industrial dispute in North Staffordshire. As a result, the Bee-Hive ceased to be the LTC's official journal and Potter lost his seat on the executive board.

Potter went on to establish the London Working Men's Association (LWMA), with the Bee-Hive as its official journal. The journal continued to advocate rights for trade unions and supported the more radical members of the Liberal Party. Potter took up editing of the Bee-Hive, but it sold poorly and was only saved from bankruptcy when Samuel Morley (a Liberal MP) and Daniel Platt bought up shares in the newspaper in June 1868.

During 1870 Rev. Henry Solly, the veteran founder of working men's clubs and institutes, took over as editor and introduced a less radical tone. Articles such as "Men who have Risen", "The Origin of Prussian Greatness" and the ultra-submissive "Letters to Statesman" were typical of this time. In early 1871 Platt ran into financial difficulties and Solly departed as editor. Potter returned, albeit in a more sober guise.

A thawing between Potter and Howell took place and from 1871 Howell became a frequent contributor to the Bee-Hive. In 1877 the Bee-Hive changed its name to the Industrial Review.

In late 1878 it was on the verge of collapse and Potter offered Howell co-partnership and full editorial control if he could raise £150. The Bee-Hive had been a losing proposition for nearly a decade so no-one could be found who was willing to put up the money. It was subsequently declared bankrupt, with debts of over £2000.

Potter attempted to continue his business by publishing political pamphlets and biographies but this too ended in failure.

The natural successor to the Bee-Hive was The Labour Standard which was published from 1881 to 1885.

== Editors ==
1861: George Troup
1863: Robert Hartwell
1870: Henry Solly
1871: George Potter
