= Sir Daniel Cooper, 1st Baronet =

Australian politician

Sir Daniel Cooper Bt GCMG
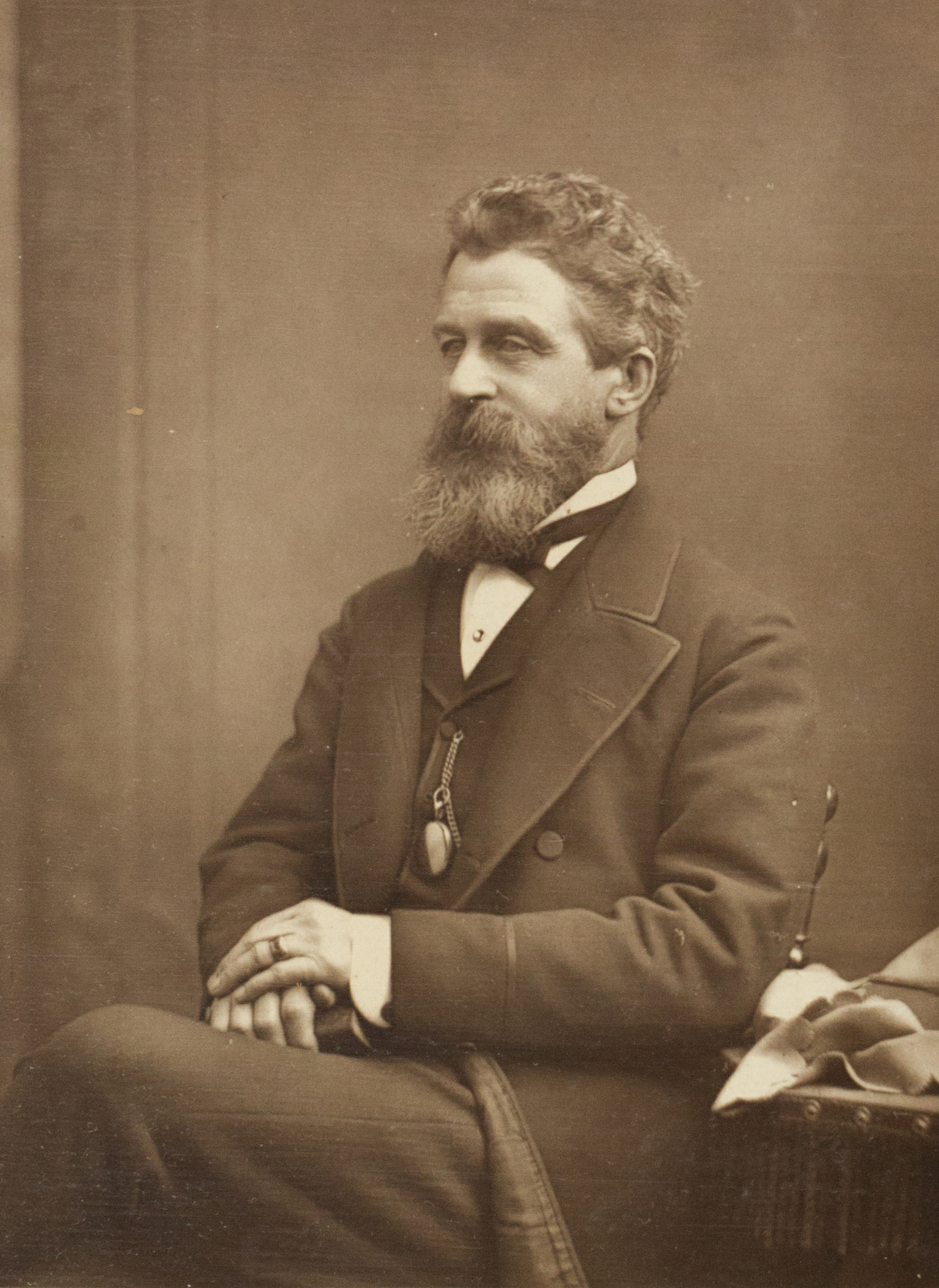

1st Speaker of the New South Wales Legislative Assembly
- In office 22 May 1856 – 31 January 1860
- Monarch: Victoria
- Premier: Sir Stuart Donaldson; Sir Charles Cowper; Sir Henry Parker; William Forster
- Governor: Sir William Denison
- Succeeded by: Sir Terence Aubrey Murray
- Constituency: Sydney Hamlets; Paddington

Personal details
- Born: 1 July 1821 Bolton-le-Moors, England
- Died: 5 June 1902 (aged 80) Kensington, London, England
- Party: Independent, Imperial Federationist
- Spouse(s): Lady Cooper, Elizabeth Hill (m.1846)
- Relations: Daniel Cooper (uncle); Douglas Cooper (great-grandson)
- Known for: Cooper baronets of Woollahra

Sir Daniel Cooper, 1st Baronet GCMG (1 July 1821 – 5 June 1902) was a nineteenth-century politician, merchant and philanthropist in the Colony of New South Wales. He served as the first speaker of the Legislative Assembly of the colony and was a noted philatelist.

Cooper was given the hereditary title of Cooper baronet of Woollahra in 1863, the second of four baronetcies conferred to British expatriates in the Australian colonies.

== Early life ==
Cooper was born at Bolton, Lancashire, England, the son of Thomas Cooper, merchant, and his wife Jane Ramsden. He was the nephew of the emancipated convict and extraordinarily successful businessman, Daniel Cooper, who supported his education. As a child his family moved to Sydney, but he returned to Britain in 1835 and studied at University College London for four years.

Cooper began business at Le Havre, France. He invested in a business, which was renamed D. Cooper and Company, and its success made him wealthy. Like his uncle, he invested in the whaling industry in Sydney. He owned two vessels that made six whaling voyages from Port Jackson between 1836 and 1852.

In 1853 he inherited the bulk of the enormous fortune of his uncle, Daniel, who had no children.

== Political career ==
In June 1849, at the age of 27, Cooper was elected a member of the unicameral Legislative Council at the by election for Counties of St Vincent and Auckland. The district was abolished on 30 June 1851 and he did not contest the 1851 election. Cooper returned to the Legislative Council in 1855 at the by election for Counties of Murray and St Vincent.

New South Wales obtained self-government in 1856, the Legislative Council was abolished and replaced with an elected Legislative Assembly and an appointed Legislative Council. Cooper was elected as the first of 2 members for the district of Sydney Hamlets, which included what were then outer suburbs of Sydney and are now the inner suburbs of Paddington, Surry Hills, Redfern, Chippendale, Glebe, Camperdown, O'Connell Town (north Newtown), Balmain, North Sydney, Kirribilli and McMahons Point. He was re-elected in 1858. The district was abolished in 1859 and replaced by four single member districts. Cooper successfully stood for Paddington from 1859 to 1860. At the first meeting of the Legislative Assembly, Cooper was elected Speaker, defeating Henry Parker by one vote. He successfully established rules of procedure and parliamentary conventions, which influenced the Parliament in the following years.

In politics, he was close to Charles Cowper and Henry Parkes and financially supported Parkes' newspaper The Empire. In return it described his political principles as being 'of so liberal a cast that, were he less identified with the great interests of property, he would be set down as a dangerous democrat'.

== Family ==
Cooper married, in 1846, Elizabeth Hill, daughter of William Hill of Sydney and Mary Johnson, both convicts, and they had two sons and five daughters.

Cooper died on 5 June 1902 in Kensington, London, and was survived by his wife and by two sons and three of their daughters. He was buried in Brompton Cemetery, London. The eldest son, Daniel Cooper (1848–1909), succeeded as second Baronet, but had only daughters and was himself succeeded by his brother William Charles Cooper (1851–1925) as third Baronet. His great-grandson was the art collector and historian Douglas Cooper.

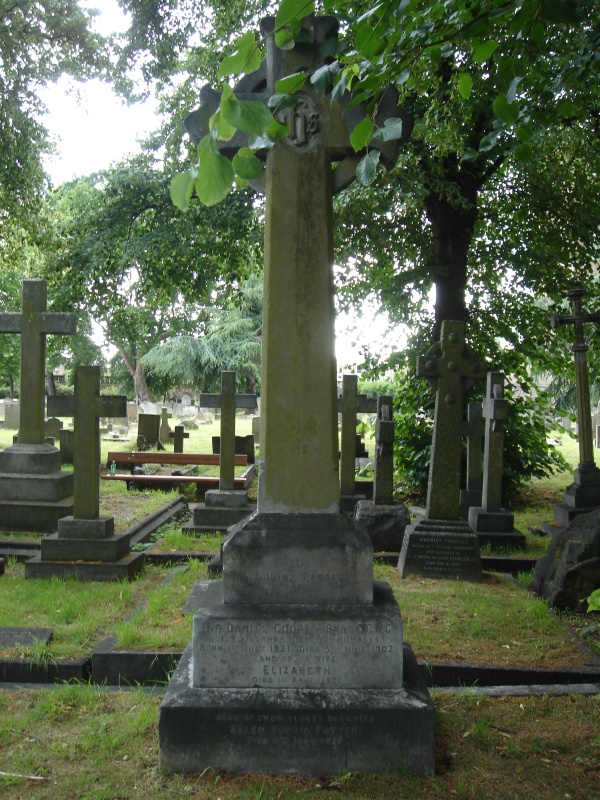
Funerary monument, Brompton Cemetery, London

== Philately ==
Cooper was a founder and the first president (1869–78) of the Philatelic Society of London, the predecessor of today's Royal Philatelic Society London. His Australian postage stamps, sold to Judge Frederick Philbrick in 1878 for £3,000 (the first four-figure price for a collection), became part of Ferrary's celebrated collection. The Sir Daniel Cooper Lectures, sponsored by the Royal Philatelic Society, are in his honour.

== Honours ==
Cooper was knighted in 1857, created a baronet of Woollahra in 1863, appointed a Knight Commander of the Order of St Michael and St George (KCMG) in 1880 and upgraded to a Knight Grand Cross (GCMG) of the order in 1888.

== See also ==
Political families of Australia: Wentworth/Hill/Griffiths/Scott/Cooper family

== Notes ==
Parliament of New South Wales
New South Wales Legislative Council
| Preceded by George Hill | Member for Counties of St Vincent and Auckland; 1849–1851 | District abolished |
| Preceded by Alick Osborne | Member for Counties of Murray and St Vincent; 1855–1856 | Council abolished |
New South Wales Legislative Assembly
| New parliament | Speaker of the Legislative Assembly; 1856–1860 | Succeeded by Terence Murray |
| New parliament | Member for Sydney Hamlets; 1856–1859 | District abolished |
| New district | Member for Paddington; 1859–1860 | Succeeded by John Sutherland |
Diplomatic posts
| Preceded by Sir Saul Samuel | Agent-General for New South Wales; 1897 – 1899 | Succeeded by Julian Salomons |
Baronetage of the United Kingdom
| New title | Baronet (of Woollahra); 1863–1902 | Succeeded by Daniel Cooper |
