= Universal League for the Material Elevation of the Industrious Classes =

- Chairperson: John Bedford Leno
- Vice-president: Edmond Beales
- Founder: John Townshend
- Founded: December 14, 1863
- Dissolved: February 23, 1865
- Succeeded by: Reform League
- Ideology: Radicalism; Trade unionism
- Political position: Left-wing

The Universal League for the Material Elevation of the Industrious Classes was a 19th-century English political movement and organization.

It was founded on 14 December 1863 by Marquis Townshend, who was one of the few aristocrats to support the reform movement. It was made up of Radicals and trade union representatives. It was chaired by John Bedford Leno, and its vice-presidents included Edmond Beales, J.A. Nicholay and Captain E. Dresser Rogers who were all to become Reform League officials.

Its aims were ambitious and were to:

- reduce working hours
- promote franchise extension
- promote the international fraternity of workers
- increase recreational and educational opportunities

Townshend obtained rooms at 18 Greek Street to use as the Universal League's headquarters. They were also used as the home of the International Working Men's Association a few months later.

Initial efforts concentrated on the right to public assembly and the amendment of the Master and Servant Act but once Gladstone declared his conversion to parliamentary reform the League's efforts were redirected to suffrage. A Universal League Reform Committee was formed to concentrate on manhood suffrage, however Townshend objected to its formation as he feared control was being wrested from his hands. This did not go down too well with the other League members who made plans throughout the autumn and winter of 1864–5 to form a separate Reform League. As a result, the Reform League was inaugurated on the 23 February 1865, leaving the Universal League defunct.
