= George Troup (journalist) =

Scottish Journalist and publisher

George Troup (1821 – 4 December 1879) was a Scottish journalist and newspaper editor.

Born in Stonehaven, Troup was raised as a member of the Free Church of Scotland. He became a newspaper editor, initially of the Montrose Review, then of the Aberdeen Banner, before moving to Belfast to edit the Banner of Ulster. In 1847, he returned to Scotland, becoming the founding editor of the North British Daily Mail, the nation's first daily newspaper.

During the 1840s, Troup was a supporter of the Chartist movement, and he also campaigned against free trade, in favour of the promotion of trade within the British Empire - to this end, he founded the West of Scotland Reciprocity Association. He also supported emigration schemes for poor workers.

In 1861, Troup became the first editor of The Bee-Hive, a trade union newspaper, but he was sacked two years later due to his support for the south in the American Civil War. Despite this, he remained friendly with its owner, George Potter, who allowed him to write articles supporting his position. From 1866 to 1867, he was a member of the London Working Men's Association.

Media offices
| Preceded by New position | Editor of the North British Daily Mail; 1847–1849 | Succeeded by Robert Somers |
| Preceded by New position | Editor of The Bee-Hive; 1861–1863 | Succeeded by Robert Hartwell |
