= Electoral district of Counties of St Vincent and Auckland =

Former legislative council electoral district of New South Wales, Australia

Counties of St Vincent and Auckland New South Wales—Legislative Council
- State: New South Wales
- Created: 1843
- Abolished: 1851
- Namesake: St Vincent County & Auckland County
- Coordinates: 35°51′26″S 150°10′44″E

The Electoral district of Counties of St Vincent and Auckland was an electorate of the partially elected New South Wales Legislative Council, created for the first elections for the Council in 1843. The electoral district consisted of the two south coast counties of St Vincent and Auckland, extending from Jervis Bay south to Eden and west to Braidwood. Polling took place at Jervis Bay, Ulladulla, Braidwood, Broulee and Eden. The district was abolished with the expansion of the Council in 1851. St Vincent was combined with Murray to the west as the Counties of Murray and St Vincent while Auckland became part of the Pastoral District of Maneroo.

== Members ==
Member	Term
John Coghill	Jun 1843 – Mar 1845
Robert Lowe	Apr 1845 - Jun 1848
George Hill	Jul 1848 – May 1849
Daniel Cooper	Jun 1849 - Jun 1851

== Election results ==
=== 1843 ===
1843 New South Wales colonial election, 21 June: Counties of St Vincent and Auckland
Candidate	Votes	%
John Coghill	unopposed	

=== 1845 ===
Coghill resigned in March 1845.

1845 Counties of St Vincent and Auckland by-election 19 April
Candidate	Votes	%
Robert Lowe	unopposed	

=== 1848 ===
1848 New South Wales colonial election, 31 July: Counties of St Vincent and Auckland
Candidate	Votes	%
George Hill (elected)	14	56
Robert Lowe	11	44
Total votes	25	100

The writ was not returned in time and the Governor issued a proclamation declaring the election was valid despite the delay.

=== 1849 ===
Hill resigned in May 1849. Both Arthur Holroyd and Edward Flood advertised that they would be standing, however neither were nominated.

1849 Counties of St Vincent and Auckland by-election 20 June
Candidate	Votes	%
Daniel Cooper	19	54.29
Alick Osborne	16	45.71
Total votes	35	100.00

== See also ==
- Members of the New South Wales Legislative Council, 1843–1851
