= Gustave Paul Cluseret =

French soldier and politician

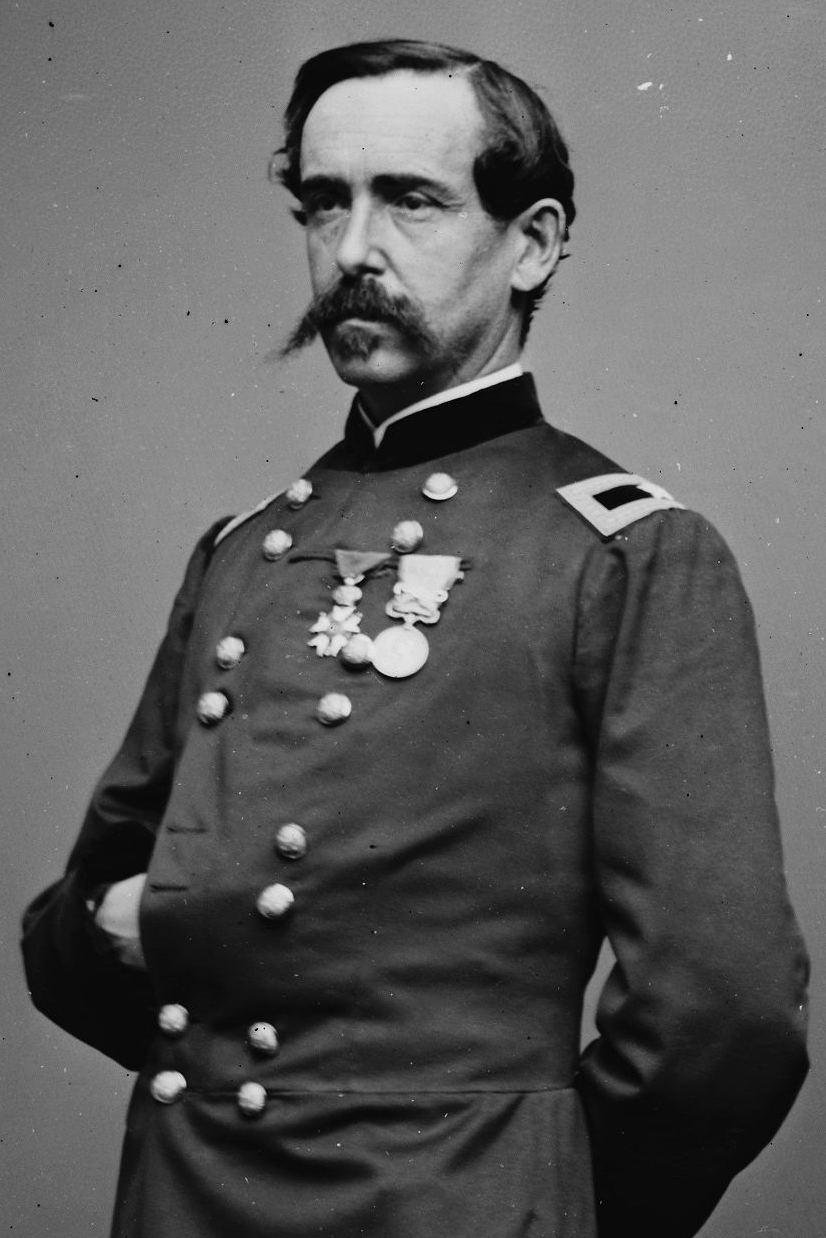
- General Gustave Paul Cluseret, during the American Civil War
- Born: 13 June 1823; Suresnes, France
- Died: 22 August 1900 (aged 77); Toulon, France
- Burial place: Suresnes Old Cemetery, Suresnes, France
- Military career
- Allegiance: Second French Republic; Second French Empire; United States of America; Union; Irish Republican Brotherhood
- Branch: French Army; United States Army / Union Army; Communards
- Service years: 1843 – 1860 (France); 1861 – 1863 (USA)
- Rank: Captain (France); Brigadier General (USA)
- Conflicts: American Civil War; Fenian Rising; Paris Commune

Gustave Paul Cluseret (13 June 1823 – 22 August 1900) was a French soldier and politician who served as a general in the Union Army during the American Civil War, and Delegate for War during the Paris Commune.

== Biography ==
=== In the French Army ===
Cluseret was born on 13 June 1823 in Suresnes, Hauts-de-Seine. In 1841 he entered the Saint-Cyr military academy, and was commissioned in the French Army in 1843. He was made captain of the 23rd Mobile Guard battalion following the February revolution of 1848, and participated in the suppression of the June Days Uprising which was to later earn him hostility in certain socialist quarters. His support for an anti-Bonapartist demonstration on 29 January 1849 saw him demoted from command of his battalion, and he fled to London after Louis-Napoléon Bonaparte's December 1851 coup.

He was reinstated as a lieutenant in early 1853 and took part in several expeditions to Algeria. He served in the Crimean War, and was wounded during the siege of Sebastopol. It was at this time that he acquired the nickname of "Captain Tin Can", derived from his hoarding of canned meat and bread rations at the expense of his troops. He resigned from the army in July 1858.

=== With Garibaldi's Volunteers ===
After brief spells in Northern Algeria and New York City, he travelled to Naples in 1860 and participated in the foundation of the De Flotte Legion, a French Corps to assist in the fight for Italian unification, of which he was soon given command. The legion was subsequently disbanded into the Piedmontese army, and Cluseret lost his colonelship.

=== In the American Civil War ===
In 1861, Cluseret returned to America to 'participate in the triumph of freedom'. He served under Fremont and McClellan, and actively lobbied to secure his promotion to the rank of brigadier general. Cluseret later served under Robert H. Milroy, in the 2nd division of Robert C. Schenck's VIII Corps. Many national officers perceived him as a soldier of fortune. He received orders from Milroy to take his brigade through the Allegheny Mountains into the Shenandoah Valley, which he obliged. Cluseret entered the valley with his brigade and occupied the town of Strasburg at first, skirmishing with Confederate troops and capturing some. Cluseret then marched northwards for the town of Winchester, Virginia, which he occupied on the Christmas Eve of 1862 with his force of 3,000 men. A few days after marching into Winchester, Cluseret's forces were harassed by Confederate cavalry. Allegedly, his command was so chaotic and disorganized that Cluseret accidentally ordered his troops to fire on his own cavalry, which killed one of their horses, causing consternation and a torrent of complaints by officers of his brigade to the division commander, General Milroy. Later on, several officers of Cluseret's brigade sent a formal petition to Milroy complaining of Cluseret's "tyrannical behavior" and rudeness, his lack of fluency in English and his European background which they viewed made it impossible for him to "understand the genius of our institutions" and (abridged) "inability of a commander of European conscripts to command American volunteer armies".

Milroy arrived soon after to occupy the town. Milroy and Cluseret then frequently quarreled; Milroy was an unrestrained and radical abolitionist, and actively enforced the Emancipation Proclamation. His treatment of the pro-confederate civilian population was also harsh. Milroy's frequent arrests or exiles of women in particular outraged Cluseret greatly. Due to these disagreements Milroy pushed for Cluseret's dismissal, writing several letters to his superior Schenck to describe Cluseret's lack of rapport with his subordinates, his overbearing behavior to his men, but avoided mentioning Cluseret's lack of enthusiasm in enforcing the emancipation proclamation. Cluseret was finally forced to relinquish command in the second week of January 1863, but did not formally resign his commission until March of that year.

Following his resignation he co-founded the New York City-based newspaper New Nation with Fremont, which adopted a radical Republican perspective, criticising Lincoln's gradualist approach to the issue of slavery. After an acrimonious dispute between the two leading to a lawsuit, Cluseret had to pay Fremont a £1,148 fine, although he remained proprietor of the New Nation for a further year.

=== The Fenian Brotherhood and Reform League ===
In 1866, the governor of New York, Reuben Fenton, entrusted Cluseret with a mission to organise the Fenian Brotherhood as part of a diversionary plan to undermine British influence in the Mediterranean. He participated in the Fenian Rising of 1867, escaping arrest on the collapse of the movement, but was condemned to death in his absence.

He fled Ireland and arrived in London just after the Reform League's Hyde Park demonstration in 1867. He met a dozen members of the Reform League, including John Bedford Leno, in a private room of the "White Horse" in Rathbone Place. He proposed that they create civil war in England and offered the service of two thousand sworn members of the Fenian body, and that he would act as their leader. John Bedford Leno was the first to reply and denounced the proposal, stating that it would surely lead to their "discomfiture and transportation", and added that the government would surely hear of the plot. During subsequent speeches, Leno noticed that only a matchboard partition divided the room they occupied with another adjoining room, and that voices could be heard the other side. Leno declared his intention to leave at once; the others agreed and the room was soon cleared. The next day the meeting was fully reported in The Times, although Leno's speech had been attributed to George Odgers, who had in fact been the only person to support Cluseret's proposal. John Bedford Leno was fully satisfied with the success the Reform League had met and, being opposed to unnecessary violence, bitterly opposed the interference of Cluseret, as did most of the other members of the Reform League. Cluseret's "call to arms" was rejected and he left England for Paris.

=== Paris Commune ===
He soon incurred the wrath of the French authorities, serving two months at Sainte-Pélagie Prison for an antimilitarist article published in his newly founded newspaper L'Art. At this time he met several members of the International Workingmen's Association. Although he claimed to have had an interest in socialist ideas since 1848, it appears he did not join the International Workingmen's Association until his detainment, although he later claimed to have been a member since 1865. He made a brief return to America to avoid further imprisonment, arriving back in France upon the proclamation of the Third Republic in 1870.

After his initial attempts to obtain a commission in the French army were refused he set to work to organize the social revolution, first at Lyon and afterwards at Marseille. Mikhail Bakunin placed much of the blame for the failure of the Lyon Commune revolution on Cluseret's refusal to arm the local volunteers. On the news of the Communard rising of 18 March 1871 he hastened to Paris, where he was appointed Delegate of War by the Commune's Executive Commission. He quickly set about reorganising the National Guard, but his attempts to introduce a centralised militarism led to friction with the federalist Central Committee who withdrew their willing co-operation, and routinely censored his proclamations. On 16 April he was elected a member of the commune, and subsequently reelected its Delegate of War. Disagreements with the other leaders of the Commune led to his arrest on 1 May, on a false charge of betraying the cause. On 21 May he appeared before an ad hoc court and was acquitted. During the occupation of Paris by the Versailles troops he hid at a priest's house, and in November left the city disguised as a priest and crossed into Belgium and from there onto Switzerland where he stayed until 1877. Cluseret published his Mémoires (of the Commune) at Paris in 1887–88.

=== After the Commune ===
Following the suppression of the Commune many Communards fled to Geneva. This allowed Cluseret to remain politically active although he was dogged with allegations of being a Prussian spy. His apparently comfortable living conditions were interpreted as a give-away. His time in Geneva was however largely uneventful and with new adventure in mind, he departed for the Ottoman Empire in late September 1877 intent on recruiting volunteers to found a republic in Turkey. After several months travelling through the Balkans, Cluseret made it to Constantinople, but little is known of his involvement in the Russo-Turkish war.

He made a brief return to France in 1880 following the amnesty offered to Communards, but again had to flee, this time for penning an article critical of General Ernest Courtot de Cissey. He returned to Constantinople where he stayed until 1886, making a living as an artist and porcelain maker, and providing the US government with a report on Turkish cotton.

After his return to France he settled in Hyères, a town near Toulon. In 1888, 1889, 1893 and 1898 he was returned to the Chamber of Deputies as a socialist by the electorate of Toulon, but forfeiting his alliance with the Guesdists in 1889. This commenced his steady drift away from socialism, leaving the International Workingmen's Association in 1893, and siding with the anti-Dreyfusards during the Dreyfus Affair. From this point on, he consistently emphasised nationalist, over socialist perspectives, and regularly engaged in increasingly anti-Semitic diatribes.

Cluseret died on 22 August 1900.

== See also ==
- List of American Civil War generals (Union)
