= James Finlen =

British radical activist

James Finlen (probably born 1829) was a British Chartist and radical activist who was noted as an orator but attracted notoriety for his support for Irish republicanism and alleged neglect of his family.

Finlen was very probably born in London, the child of Irish Roman Catholic parents. He was apprenticed as a french polisher, a skilled artisan craft. Finlen was active in the Chartist movement by 1851, when he represented Finsbury at its convention. He was elected to the executive of the National Charter Association (NCA) in 1852, and was a delegate to the Manchester Labour Parliament in 1854. He began working closely with Ernest Jones, the two launching the People's Paper, and with Jones' support he became joint leader of the NCA in 1856. In 1857, Finlen fell out with Jones. He moved to Glasgow, where he attempted to launch a new newspaper, as a rival to the People's Paper. He later lived in Manchester and in 1860 - by now married - returned to London.

In 1866, Finlen began working for the Reform League as a travelling lecturer. He was also associated with the decidedly ultra-radical Holborn branch of the Reform League and developed a reputation as a theatrical but effective orator. At open-air meetings, Finlen also championed Irish republicanism and argued vociferously against death sentences passed on the Fenian Martyrs and other convicted Fenians. On one occasion, he led a deputation to the Home Office which - on failing to secure a meeting with the Home Secretary - staged an impromptu demonstration within the ministry buildings.

A Fenian bomb attack in London in December 1867 known as the Clerkenwell explosion or Outrage led to a chorus of press complaints about Fenian sympathisers among London radicals. Newspapers also accused Finlen of neglecting his family when his wife was admitted to an asylum and his children taken into the workhouse. Cartoons disparaged Finlen in an attempt to mock the Reform League and to taint the mainstream Liberal Party leader, William Ewart Gladstone.

With few friends left and little money, James Finlen dropped out of active politics. Well-wishers sought to raise funds to allow Finlen to emigrate to the United States. But in 1888, his onetime colleague in the Reform League, George Howell came across Finlen living near Warrington under an assumed name. His date and place of death have not been established.

== Publications ==
- A Warning and an Example! Maximilian, his life and death, 1867
- Mr J. Finlen's Defence of Himself against the Attacks made upon him by the Parliament and Press of England, 1868
