= Henry Solly =

Henry Solly (17 November 1813 – 27 February 1903) was an English social reformer. William Beveridge said of him: "He was a restless, inventive, constructive spirit, part author of at least three large living movements; charity organisation, working men's clubs, and garden cities".

== Life ==
He was the son of Isaac Solly, a merchant in the Baltic trade. He became a Chartist. He supported many Radical causes, such as universal suffrage, free education, repeal of the Corn Laws, co-operatives, anti-slavery, and early closing for shops and Sunday opening for museums. In the early 1860s he took a leading part in founding working men's clubs, setting up the Working Men's Club and Institute Union, though as a teetotaller he did not want them to sell alcohol.

In June 1868 Solly's paper, titled ‘How to deal with the Unemployed Poor of London and with its “Roughs” and Criminal Classes’ was read at a meeting of the Society of Arts, chaired by the Bishop of London, A. C. Tait. This led to plans for the Charity Organization Society.

In 1877 Solly founded the Workmen's Social Education League. By 1879 John Robert Seeley had become president, a position he retained until 1883. In 1879 the organisation was renamed the Social and Political Education League.

In 1884 Solly founded the Society for the Promotion of Industrial Villages. Although this was a failure, it led to Sir Ebenezer Howard's Garden City movement.

Solly died of a brain haemorrhage in 1903. B. T. Hall, the secretary of the Working Men's Club and Institute Union, wrote a year later: "If the work that the Clubs do, if their influence on personal character and their contribution to the sum total of human happiness be correctly appreciated...then shall the investigator reckon Henry Solly amongst the constructive statesmen of our time".

He spent the first half of his adult life as a Unitarian minister, and after he left the profession, continued to worship at Rosslyn Hill Unitarian Chapel.

== Family ==
Solly had four daughters, one of whom married Philip Wicksteed, and one son, who wrote the biography of Henry Morley. One of his students, Anna Evans, who stayed with his family later achieved fame under the pen name "Allen Raine".

== Notes ==
Media offices
Preceded by Robert Hartwell	Editor of The Bee-Hive; 1870	Succeeded by George Potter
