= Electoral district of Counties of Murray and St Vincent =

Former legislative council electoral district of New South Wales, Australia

Counties of Murray and St Vincent New South Wales—Legislative Council
- State: New South Wales
- Created: 1851
- Abolished: 1856
- Namesake: Murray County & St Vincent County
- Coordinates: 32°55′S 151°45′E

The Electoral district of Counties of Murray and St Vincent was an electorate of the New South Wales Legislative Council at a time when some of its members were elected and the balance were appointed by the Governor. It was a new electorate created in 1851 by the expansion of the Legislative Council to 54, 18 to be appointed and 36 elected. The district consisted of the rural areas of Murray County, which had previously been part of Counties of Murray, King and Georgiana, and St Vincent County, which had previously been part of Counties of St Vincent and Auckland. The towns of Braidwood and Queanbeyan were not part of the district, being included in Southern Boroughs.

In 1856 the unicameral Legislative Council was abolished and replaced with an elected Legislative Assembly and an appointed Legislative Council. The district was represented by the Legislative Assembly electorate of United Counties of Murray and St Vincent.

== Members ==
Member	Term
Alick Osborne	Sep 1851 – Feb 1855
Daniel Cooper	Mar 1855 – Feb 1856

== Election results ==
=== 1851 ===
1851 New South Wales colonial election, 23 September: Counties of Murray and St Vincent
Candidate	Votes	%
Alick Osborne	103	56.91
Charles Campbell	78	43.09
Total votes	181	100.00

=== 1855 ===
Alick Osborne resigned in February 1855.

Counties of Murray and St Vincent by-election 19 March 1855
Candidate	Votes	%
Daniel Cooper	169	80.09
Dr William Sherwin	42	19.91
Total votes	211	100
