= A fair day's wage for a fair day's work =

American Federation of Labor slogan and goal

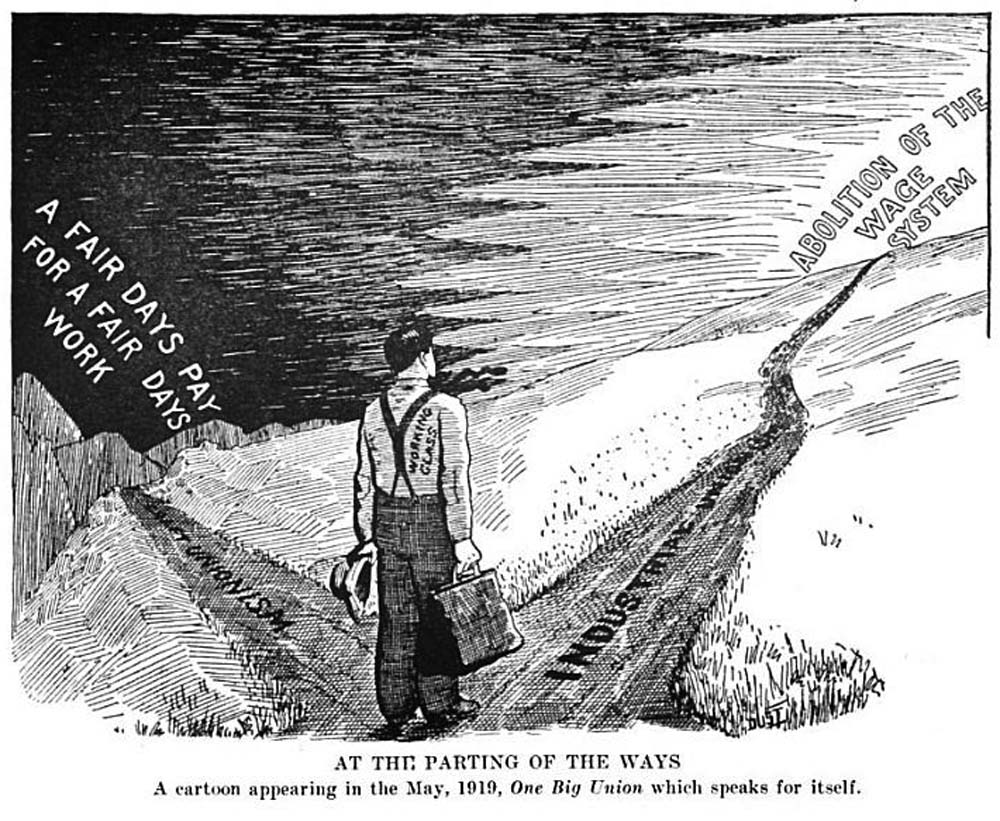
"A fair day's pay for a fair day's work" vs "Abolition of the Wages System", One Big Union, May 1919

A fair day's wage for a fair day's work is an objective of the labor movement, trade unions and other workers' groups, to increase pay, and adopt reasonable hours of work. It is a motto of the American Federation of Labor.

== Critique ==
In 1881 Frederick Engels criticised the slogan in the first issue of The Labour Standard. He argued that workers exchange their full labour power for a day in return for the subsistence necessary to maintain them for a day: "The workman gives as much, the Capitalist gives as little, as the nature of the bargain will admit." He also points out that capitalists can force a better bargain as they can live off their capital, but workers, without reserves, will be forced to accept work at a less advantageous rate. As innovation continually replaces workers with machines, he argues, workers come to form an industrial reserve army. Further, he argues that the wealth of capitalists has been accumulated through the exploitation of workers. He ends up calling for the old motto to be buried for ever and replaced by another motto: "Possession of the Means of Work, Raw Material, Factories, Machinery, By the Working People Themselves."

That critique was taken up by Karl Marx, who in Value, Price and Profit said:

"Instead of the conservative motto, 'A fair day's wage for a fair day's work!' they ought to inscribe on their banner the revolutionary watchword: 'Abolition of the wage system!'"
