= Cooper baronets of Woollahra (1863) =

Escutcheon of the Cooper baronets of Woollahra

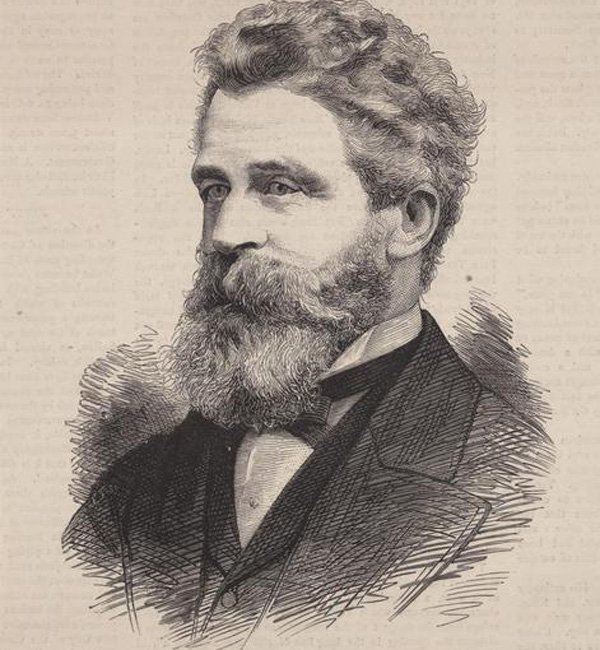
Sir Daniel Cooper, 1st Baronet, of Woollahra

The Cooper baronetcy, of Woollahra in New South Wales, was created in the Baronetage of the United Kingdom on 26 January 1863 for the Australian politician Daniel Cooper.

== Cooper baronets of Woollahra (1863) ==
- Sir Daniel Cooper, 1st Baronet, GCMG (1821–1902)
- Sir Daniel Cooper, 2nd Baronet (1848–1909)
- Sir William Charles Cooper, 3rd Baronet (1851–1925)
- Sir William George Daniel Cooper, 4th Baronet (1877–1954)
- Sir Charles Eric Daniel Cooper, 5th Baronet (1906–1984)
- Sir William Daniel Charles Cooper, 6th Baronet (born 1955)

The heir presumptive to the baronetcy is George John Cooper (born 1956), brother of the 6th Baronet.

Cooper baronets of Woollahra line of succession
- Sir Daniel Cooper, 1st Baronet, of Woollahra, in New South Wales (1821–1902)
  - Sir Daniel Cooper, 2nd Baronet (1848–1909)
  - Sir William Charles Cooper, 3rd Baronet (1851–1925)
    - Sir William George Daniel Cooper, 4th Baronet (1877–1954)
      - Sir Charles Eric Daniel Cooper, 5th Baronet (1906–1984)
        - Sir William Daniel Charles Cooper, 6th Baronet (born 1955)
        - (1) George John Cooper (b. 1956)
    - Maj. Arthur Hamilton Cooper (1881–1973)
      - (Arthur William) Douglas Cooper (1911–1984)
      - Robert Henry Cooper (1922–1994)
        - (2) William Jeremy Daniel Cooper (b. 1951)
          - (3) Daniel Alexander Westrow Cooper (b. 1982)
          - (4) Richard Gregory Christopher Cooper (b. 1984)
          - (5) Samuel Robert Paul Cooper (b. 1988)
        - (6) Westrow Gerald Alan Cooper (b. 1956)
