= Adullamites =

Anti-reform faction within the UK Liberal Party

The Adullamites were a short-lived anti-reform faction within the UK Liberal Party in 1866. The name was a biblical reference to the cave of Adullam where David and his allies sought refuge from Saul.

After the death of Palmerston in 1865, a second Reform Act became a priority for the Liberal Party. However, not all sections of the party agreed with that agenda. The most important internal opposition came from the so-called Adullamites. The name, coined by John Bright, was a biblical reference that would have been widely understood at the time.

The Adullamite faction was led by Robert Lowe and Lord Elcho. After repeated attacks on Gladstone's bill, they eventually defeated the government over an amendment to the Bill on 18 June 1866, by 315 votes to 304. The vote gave the Prime Minister, John Russell, cause to resign. There was an abortive attempt to form a Conservative/Adullamite coalition. However, the Adullamites were not prepared to accept Disraeli as leader and negotiations broke down. That led to the formation of the Third Derby–Disraeli ministry which, ultimately, proposed its own reform bill. With some exceptions, the Adullamites then returned to the Liberal Party.

== Prominent Adullamites ==
- Augustus Anson
- Sir George Bowyer, Bt.
- Frederick Doulton
- Lord Dunkellin
- Lord Elcho
- Edward Ellice
- William Henry Gregory
- The Earl Grey
- Earl Grosvenor
- Gilbert Heathcote
- Edward Horsman
- Samuel Laing
- The Marquess of Lansdowne
- The Earl of Lichfield
- Robert Lowe
- Sir Robert Peel, Bt.
- Sir Richard Williams-Bulkeley, Bt.

== See also ==
- Liberal Unionist Party - split from the Liberals in 1886 over Irish Home Rule
- National Liberal Party (UK, 1931)
- Social Democratic Party (UK) - split from the Labour Party in 1981 and ultimately merged with the Liberals
