= Spirit of Freedom, and Working Man's Vindicator =

The Spirit of Freedom, and Working Man's Vindicator was a Chartist publication noted for its rigorous and untiring determination to call a "man a man, and a spade a spade". It was "full of fire and breathed the spirit of republicanism".

It was written in 1849 in Uxbridge by John Bedford Leno and Gerald Massey who were new converts to Chartism. Neither had much writing experience and based its contents upon the Northern Star and other Chartist publications and "had formed the opinion that the effectiveness of an article was dependent upon the amount of treason it contained". Much to their surprise it was quite successful, although reviews were mixed;

"they were highly praised as the naturally indignant outpurings of the wronged, and condemned as the venom of snakes; they were the words of patriots and of men charged with treason; they were full of wisdom and insanity"

It was received by the locals of Uxbridge with some scepticism; an ironmonger wrote upon a shovel "This is a spade" and stuck it outside his door; a witty baker travestied the title into "Spirit of Mischief, or Working Man's Window Breaker" and the parson warned his flock not to be led astray by the "inculcators of treason".

However, Chartists in London and the north were impressed that such a publication could be produced in a relatively contented suburb such as Uxbridge and it became popular. It was still remembered by the press, over forty years later, when John Bedford Leno received a grant from Parliament in 1893.

It was published for a year before John Bedford Leno and Gerald Massey left Uxbridge for London and went their separate ways.
