= Reform League =

Former political movement in United Kingdom

- President: Edmond Beales
- Secretary: George Howell
- Founded: February 23, 1865
- Dissolved: March 1869
- Preceded by: Universal League for the Material Elevation of the Industrious Classes
- Succeeded by: Democratic and Trades Alliance Association
- Newspaper: Workman's Advocate
- Ideology: Reformism; Liberalism; Radicalism
- Political position: Left-wing

The Reform League was established in 1865 to press for manhood suffrage and the ballot in Great Britain. It collaborated with the more moderate and middle class Reform Union and gave strong support to the abortive Reform Bill 1866 and the successful Reform Act 1867. It developed into a formidable force of agitation at the very heart of the country.

== Origins ==
During the autumn and winter of 1864–65 members of the Universal League for the Material Elevation of the Industrious Classes planned to form a new organisation which would concentrate solely on manhood suffrage. As a result, the Reform League was established on 23 February 1865 and the Universal League for the Material Elevation of the Industrious Classes became defunct. The leadership of the League, which was to remain consistent throughout its life, drew heavily on personalities from the International Working Men's Association, including George Howell, George Odger, William Cremer and Benjamin Lucraft. The father of the International, Karl Marx was delighted but he soon came to be disappointed by the outlook of the League. The League leadership also included a number of respectable figures including the barrister, Edmond Beales, as President of the League and Sir Wilfrid Lawson.

The League excluded a number of trade unionists, including Thomas Vize of the Painters and John Bedford Leno the shoemaker poet because they had supported the South during the American Civil War.

During the first few months of the League's existence, it proved important that Howell's role was a full-time one that was paid for by a few wealthy supporters. This enabled him to concentrate on marketing the League in newspapers and communicating announcements of the Reform League's Executive Committee. This helped recruit supporters. New branches were rapidly opened in both London and the provinces. During its first year the League received donations of £621, of which £476 came from rich Radicals such as P.A. Taylor MP, Samuel Morley MP and Sir Wilfred Lawson MP.

The Liberals remained in power after the 1865 election.

== Reform Bill 1866 ==
Support quickly grew for the League and meetings were held in pubs all over London. It provided left-wing leadership to a broader-based national movement that built up rapidly over the winter of 1865–6.

William Ewart Gladstone introduced a Reform Bill in March 1866. It was criticised on all quarters; some thought it went too far, others that it didn't go far enough.

Three months later an amendment to the bill brought down the Russell-Gladstone government in June and the bill was dropped. Robert Lowe, 1st Viscount Sherbrooke a Liberal M.P., enraged the working class by describing them as "impulsive, unreflecting, violent people" guilty of "venality, ignorance, drunkenness and intimidation". "Eight years in Australia and a visit to America had left him a convinced opponent of democracy." A succession of Tory Ministers further frustrated the working classes and the Reform League saw the chance to start major agitations which were to achieve pre-eminent national importance and put the Reform Union in the shade.

== Trafalgar Square demonstration of 1866 ==
Disappointed with the failure of the Bill, the Reform League, organised a series of demonstrations throughout the nation. The radical MPs John Bright and Charles Bradlaugh were prominent in these public meetings which attracted crowds in the hundred thousands. At one such meeting, in Trafalgar Square on 29 June 1866, speeches were made which refused support for any future Reform Bill which was not based on the League's programme. It was also declared that the advent of Tories to power was "destructive to freedom at home and favourable to despotism abroad". Red flags and the cap of liberty were sported by a march from Clerkenwell Green. Crowds cheered the Liberal Reform Club in Pall Mall and Gladstone's house in Carlton House Terrace and jeered loudly outside the Conservative Carlton Club.

A second meeting on 2 July 1866 was even more heated, with rioting in the West End by a "fortuitous concourse of the waifs and strays and roughs of a great city".

== Hyde Park demonstration of 1866 ==
Reform leaguers at the Marble Arch in 1866 (illustration by W. H. Overend)

The Trafalgar Square meetings were followed by a giant meeting held at Hyde Park on 23 July 1866. The Tory Home Secretary, Spencer Horatio Walpole declared it to be illegal, and issued a Police Notice, but the Reform League resolved to attempt to enter the Park and, if this failed, to move on to Trafalgar Square.

The procession started off from the Reform League's headquarters, at 8 Adelphi Terrace, headed by a cab containing the Reform League's president, Edmond Beales, his friend Colonel Dickson and a few other aristocratic supporters.

The procession was so vast that when the leading carriage reached Bond Street, the last had not yet left Holborn. When the procession reached Marble Arch they were confronted by a line of policemen and the park's gates were chained. 1600 constables, on foot and mounted, guarded Marble Arch alone. Barricades of omnibuses were on every side; the carriages of the wealthy blocked the way. A massive crowd assembled at the Arch and Beales attempted to enter the park. The police prevented this amid scuffles. Three days of what are variously described as "skirmishes" or "riots" ensued.

While arguing with the police, John Bedford Leno's friend, Humphreys, noticed that the railings would stand no pressure and began to sway them backwards and forwards. He was soon helped by the masses and the railings fell in what was to become known as the "Hyde Park Railings Affair". The people flooded into Hyde Park despite the efforts of the police to restrain them.

Simultaneously, two other parts of the demonstration also broke into the park; one from Knightsbridge headed by Charles Bradlaugh, and another from Park Lane. In addition to the members of the procession, large numbers of bystanders, who were sympathetic to the cause, joined in the storming of Hyde Park and the police were overwhelmed "like flies before a waiter's napkin". It is estimated that 200,000 people invaded the park leading the police to call for military support. When the Royal Horse Guards arrived the crowds cried "Three cheers for the Guards - the people's Guards!". The soldiers held back and merely manoeuvred at a distance, despite the police commissioner, Sir Richard Mayne, and others being stoned by the mob.

The meeting proceeded as planned under the Reformer's Tree. At its end it was decided to hold another meeting the next evening in Trafalgar Square. John Bedford Leno and the leaders of the Reform League heard a rumour that the government was determined to crack down on the demonstrators and so decided to confront the Home Secretary, Walpole. They pointed out to him that if the police or military stepped in bloodshed would ensue. With tears in his eyes Walpole agreed that restraint was the best option. John Bedford Leno and George Odger went back to the crowds and announced the next evening's meeting at Trafalgar Square. As the sun set the crowds dispersed and the police and military held back, out of sight, and the meeting passed without undue violence.

The next evening's meeting at Trafalgar Square was chaired by John Bedford Leno and was also peaceful.

The "Hyde Park Railings Affair" was widely reported and made the Reform League's leaders household names. They were in hot demand to speak at public meetings and demonstrations across the country and saw a rapid increase in support of the Reform League.

== Winter of discontent ==
During the next few months the Reform League expanded its branches and demonstrations around the country. A notable success was achieved at the Birmingham Reform demonstrations on 28 Aug 1866 which allowed a Midland Department of the Reform League to be formed. This prospered and boasted almost 10,000 members and held great mass meetings at critical stages of the Reform campaign of 1867.

The Reform League thought it vital to embrace the more middle-class supporters of the Reform Union and were careful to avoid violence or illegitimate actions. Meetings were closely controlled with one reputedly having 10,000 stewards. They encouraged John Bright to speak at events as he was one of the Reform movement's intellectual leaders. Bright addressed meetings including Manchester (24 September), West Riding/Leeds (8 October), Glasgow (16 October) and Dublin (2 November).

Keen to avoid scaring their new-found middle-class supporters the Reform League's London Executive decided to avoid holding meetings in central London for a while. On 3 December 1866 thousands of League supporters marched from Whitehall to the grounds of Beaufort House, Fulham to hold a meeting. The march was made in a dispiriting downpour, but the fine discipline displayed by the rain-sodden men gave their leaders another claim to public attention. The next day it was reported in the Times that the working men had done enough to show they were earnest in their demand for enfranchisement and asked them to stop their disturbing actions and to wait for the reforms that the Parliament was now certain to make.

In the winter of 1866 discontent increased as cold gripped the nation with great East End distress, a growing Fenian problem in Ireland and amongst the Irish in English cities, Trade Union restlessness grew and a feverish international atmosphere followed Bismarck's foundation of an apparent democracy in the North German Confederation. The Reform League continued to campaign and soon found that it was supported by most of the British working-class.

== Agricultural Hall, Islington meeting of 1867 ==
The Reform League's leaders were determined not to make the mistake of easing off that they had made at the time of the Reform Bill 1866, and so continued demonstrating. On 11 February 1867, the very day the Tory government had fixed for the announcement of its reforms, the League arranged an impressive demonstration that started from Trafalgar Square and ended at a meeting at the Agricultural Hall in Islington. The procession included every sort of Trade Union and Reform League branch from all around the country, all carrying banners and accompanied by bands.

That evening a number of "advanced Liberal" MPs freshly arrived from a sitting at the House of Commons with news of how "unsatisfactory" the Tory government's proposals for reform were. This made the working men at the meeting all the more determined not to relinquish their efforts for "pressure from without" until the Tory cabinet made much more generous proposals for reform.

== Hyde Park demonstration of 1867 ==
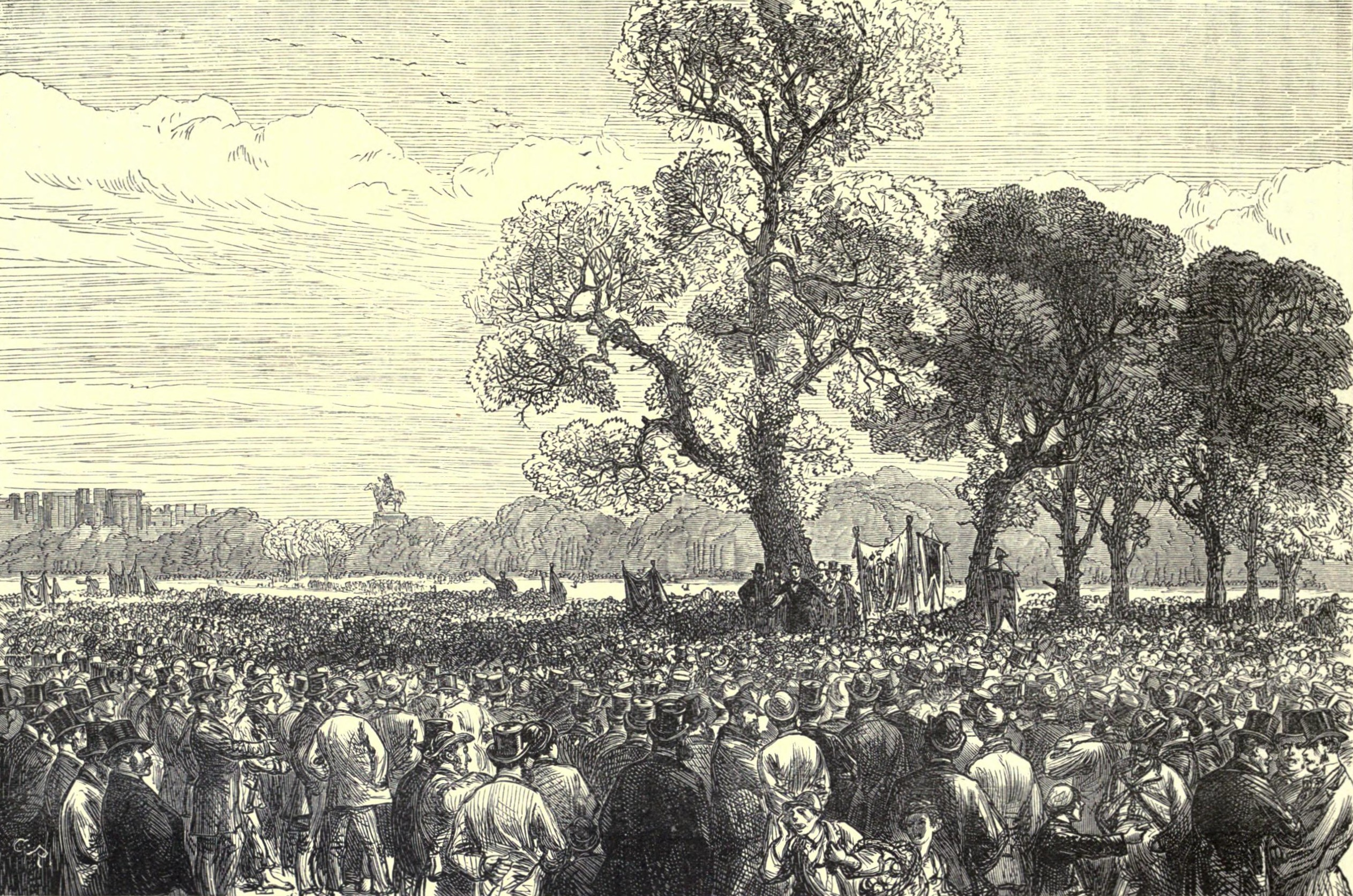
Meeting at the Reformers tree, Hyde Park 1867

The league now numbered one hundred branches in London alone and its deputations to Gladstone on 30 March 1867 and to Disraeli on 2 April 1867 were received with great attention.

Lord Shaftesbury's appeal to the Reform League to cancel a proposed Good Friday procession to Hyde Park, due to fear of a gigantic "profanation", was accepted by the League's leaders as they were concerned it might mobilise religious sentiment against them. This was a disappointment as the prospect of a procession on a bank holiday, like Good Friday, was an excellent opportunity to draw large crowds of workers who had the day off.

As pressure for reform built up nationally, the League decided to hold another Hyde Park meeting. The government banned it, saying it was illegal, but the League countered that the ban itself was illegal and posted posters to this effect on 1 May. The government backed down. Eventually 200,000 met at Hyde Park on 6 May and speeches were made on ten different platforms. The government planned to use violence, having sworn in large numbers of special constables on 4 May, but backed down at the last minute.

Walpole subsequently resigned over the confusion of free speech in Hyde Park and it was never again questioned.

== English Civil War ==
Gustave Paul Cluseret fled Ireland and arrived in London immediately after the Reform League's Trafalgar Square meeting. He met a dozen members of the Reform League, including John Bedford Leno, in a private room of the "White Horse" in Rathbone Place. He proposed that they create civil war in England and offered the service of two thousand sworn members of the Fenian body, and that he would act as their leader.

John Bedford Leno was the first to reply and denounced the proposal, stating that it would surely lead to their "discomfiture and transportation", and added that the government would surely hear of the plot. During subsequent speeches Leno noticed that only a matchboard partition divided the room they occupied, with another adjoining room, and that voices could be heard on the other side. Leno declared his intention to leave at once, the others agreed, and the room was soon cleared. The next day the meeting was fully reported in The Times, although Leno's speech had been attributed to George Odger, who had in fact supported Cluseret's proposal. Leno concluded that there had been a leak and that the traitor had been Robert Hartwell, the editor of The Bee-Hive journal.

John Bedford Leno was fully satisfied with the success the Reform League had met and, being opposed to unnecessary violence, bitterly opposed the interference of Cluseret, as did most of the other members of the Reform League. Cluseret's "call to arms" was rejected and he left England for Paris to start his "War of the Commune".

== The End of the League ==
The Reform League's campaigning culminated in the passing of the Reform Act 1867 which gave the vote to representatives of working class men for the first time.

Despite a Reform Bill being on the Statute Book by mid-August, the League's leaders resolved that the organisation needed to be kept going to watch over the Scottish and Irish Representation Bills, whose enactment was reserved for 1868, and to forward Vote by Ballot and a wider county franchise.

They received support from John Bright, who hoped the League would be spurred on by its success and would continue to campaign for the ballot. Tories were alarmed at the prospect of two permanent bodies of agitation (the League and the Union) of a kind they had never known before.

Demonstrations continued, culminating in the surprisingly successful "working men's" assembly of 11 Nov 1867 in Crystal Palace. However, the focus of the league started to recede once most "respectable" working men had received the householder or lodger vote. Years of demonstrations began to tire the workers and the thought of many more years of the same no longer held the same appeal.

In addition, the Sheffield Outrages and the Fenian "martyrdoms" took over as the main working class issues of the day. Notable events of this time include the "funeral processions" of 24 Nov 1867 and the "Fenian Outrage" at Clerkenwell Prison on 13 Dec 1867. Pro-Fenian indiscretions by some members of the Reform League, such as George Odger and James Finlen were seized by the Tory press as chances to scare the population that the Reform League would continue agitation indefinitely.

"Advanced Liberal" politicians of respectability, who had worked with the League in 1866–7 and had tasted its power to cause reform, were determined not to let the League die at a time when they needed support against Conservative resistance to changes in Ireland. The very wealthy Samuel Morley gave the League £250 in November 1867, followed by £25 from P. A. Taylor and £20 from Abraham Walter Paulton in January 1868, £100 from Titus Salt in April 1868 and £100 from Thomas Thomasson in June 1868. However, Samuel Morley gave another donation of £1,900 which enabled the League to send out numerous "deputations" to boroughs where a useful Trade Union and working-class vote might be won for the "advanced Liberalism" of the General Election of Nov 1868. Their help was gratefully received and enough "advanced Liberals" were elected in Nov 1868 to cause the immediate resignation of Benjamin Disraeli's cabinet.

As reward for their help, Morley had also allowed some of his £1,900 to finance a number of the Reform League's leaders (e.g., Edmond Beales in Tower Hamlets, George Howell (aided by John Bedford Leno) in Aylesbury and William Randal Cremer in Warwick, etc.) to stand themselves in the election. None succeeded, mainly due to a lack of respectability and also due to a failure of negotiations to allow them to contest suitable constituencies.

The Reform League was dissolved in March 1869, and some of its members went on to become Liberal MPs or activists.
