= Robert Somers =

Scottish journalist and author

Robert Somers (1822–1891) was a Scottish journalist and author.

== Life ==
The son of Robert Somers and his wife, Jane Gordon Gibson, he was born at Newton Stewart in Wigtownshire, on 14 September 1822, of English extraction on his father's side and Scottish on his mother's. In early life he was known as a lecturer on social and political questions.

In 1844 Somers published a pamphlet Scottish Poor Laws, containing a criticism of the Poor Law Amendment Act then passing through parliament. After its publication he became editor of the Scottish Herald, a weekly newspaper then being started in Edinburgh. It was shortly managed with The Witness edited by Hugh Miller, whose colleague and assistant Somers became.

Somers went to Glasgow in 1847, to join the staff of the North British Daily Mail; in the autumn of that year he was sent to the Highlands by the paper, to inquire into the distress in north-west Scotland after the failure of the potato crop in 1846. From 1849 to 1859 he was editor at Glasgow of the North British Daily Mail and, then for the next 11 years, of the Morning Journal.

In 1870–1 Somers travelled for six months in the USA, investigating the effect on the economic condition of the South of the political changes introduced by the American Civil War. He died in London on 7 July 1891, after several years of impaired health.

== Works ==
Somers was known for The Southern States Since the War. 1870-1 (London and New York, 1871). He took the view that the early Reconstruction Era in the South was a time of African-American political power.

He became a recognised authority on monetary and commercial questions, published pamphlets dealing with banking, education, and labour issues, and contributed articles in these areas to the Encyclopædia Britannica ninth edition. He also wrote:

- Letters from the Highlands (London, 1848).
- Sheriff Court Reform, or Cheap and Speedy Justice, Edinburgh, 1853.
- Results of an Inquiry into the State of Education in Glasgow, London and Glasgow, 1857.
- The Secular Theory of Education examined, Edinburgh, 1872.
- The Education (Scotland) Act of 1872, with notes, London, 1873,
- Scotch Banks and their System of Issue, London, 1873.
- The Martyr of Glencree, historical romance, London, 1878.

== Notes ==
Media offices
Preceded by George Troup	Editor of the North British Daily Mail; 1849–1859	Succeeded by Charles Cameron
