= Social and Political Education League =

The Social and Political Education League was a nineteenth century English educational organisation. It was founded as the Workmen's Social Education League in 1877 by Henry Solly and in 1879 John Robert Seeley had become president. In 1881 it was renamed the Social and Political Education League.
