= George Potter (trade unionist) =

English trade unionist

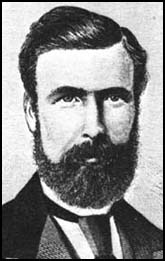
George Potter

George Potter (1832 – 3 June 1893) was an English trade unionist.

== Biography ==
George Potter was born in Kenilworth. He was educated for a short time at a local dame school, but left to work at a young age to supplement his father's income of three shillings a day. He worked as a farm labourer until he was sixteen, when he moved to Coventry where he became an apprentice joiner and cabinet-maker. In 1854 he moved to London to work as a carpenter.

In London, he joined a small trade union, the Progressive Society of Carpenters and Joiners, to which he was elected secretary in 1854, and chairman in 1858. He believed that progress could be made if all trade unions representing the building trades were united in one society, so in 1859 organised the Building Trades Conference. At the conference, the unions agreed to demand a maximum working day of nine hours from their employers. The employers refused, resulting in strike action and a lockout. Eventually the unions conceded, but due to his actions Potter became a prominent figure in the New Model Unions movement. He was regarded as a more intellectual, 'respectable' trade unionist, due in part to his smart appearance and restrained public speaking style. He was made an executive member of the London Trades Council (LTC).

Potter established a weekly trade unionist journal, the Bee-Hive in 1861 edited by the journalist George Troup. It was adopted as the official journal of the LTC, but by 1862 only had a circulation of 2700, while Potter had debts of £827. Some members of the LTC complained that the Bee-Hive gave its support too unreservedly to strike action, with Robert Applegarth accusing Potter of being a "manufacturer of strikes". Potter defended the policy by arguing that each strike had been judged as necessary by a trade union, and therefore deserved the full support of the LTC.

Applegarth lead an investigation into the Bee-Hive's reporting in 1865, and accused Potter of personal dishonesty and maladministration regarding the journal's coverage of an industrial dispute in North Staffordshire. As a result, the Bee-Hive ceased to be the LTC's official journal and Potter lost his seat on the executive board.

John Bedford Leno noted that in 1867 Robert Hartwell was the real editor of the Bee-Hive, and that Potter had assumed the credit for it.

Potter went on to establish the London Working Men's Association (LWMA), with the Bee-Hive as its official journal. The journal continued to advocate rights for trade unions and supported the more radical members of the Liberal Party. Potter took up editing of the Bee-Hive, but it sold poorly and he was only saved from bankruptcy when Samuel Morley (a Liberal MP) and Daniel Platt bought up shares in the newspaper in June 1868.

In March 1871 Potter was elected first President of the Trades Union Congress (TUC), and made chairman of the Parliamentary Committee on Trade Unions. He also joined (along with Applegarth and Howell) the Working Men's Committee for Promoting the Separation of Church and State.

In 1873 Potter was elected to the London School Board. He represented Westminster on the school board until 1882, being re-elected on two occasions. At the 1882 school board election he was unseated, coming last of seven candidates.

In 1878 the Bee-Hive was declared bankrupt, with debts of over £2000. Potter attempted to continue his business by publishing political pamphlets and biographies but this too ended in failure.

He twice contested parliamentary elections for the Liberal Party, but failed to win a seat. He was a candidate at Peterborough in 1874 and at Preston in 1886.

On 8 April 1893 Potter took part in a demonstration in Trafalgar Square against the Direct Veto Bill, a piece of proposed legislation controlling the opening hours of public houses. The demonstration descended into violence with police clearing the square. Potter became ill at the event, and never returned to work. He died at his home at Marney Road, Clapham Common from "paralysis of the brain" on 3 June 1893.

Trade union offices
Preceded by W. H. Wood	Secretary of the Parliamentary Committee of the TUC; 1869–1872	Succeeded by George Odger
Preceded by New position	Chairman of the Parliamentary Committee of the TUC; 1869–1872	Succeeded by Alexander Macdonald
Preceded by T. J. Wilkinson	President of the Trades Union Congress; 1870	Succeeded by W. H. Leatherland
Media offices
Preceded by Henry Solly	Editor of The Bee-Hive; 1871–1878	Succeeded by Publication closed
