= National Reform Union =

Former political organisation in Britain

The National Reform Union (NRU) was a British political organisation formed in 1864 and was composed mainly of Liberal Party members. At the start of 1867 the Reform Union had 150 branches compared to the Reform League's 400.

The Reform Union was more intellectual than the similarly motived Reform League but was less influential. It enjoyed the support of the prosperous middle class whereas the Reform League enjoyed the support of trade unionists, ex-Chartists and the working class and were perceived as a threat by the establishment due to the agitation it could create.
