= The Labour Standard =

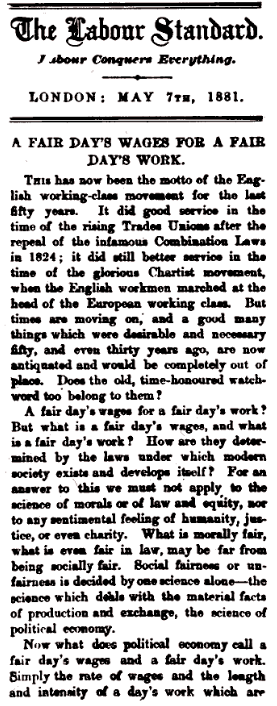
Engels article "A fair day's wage for a fair day's work"

The Labour Standard was a short-lived trade unionist newspaper in London, published between May 1881 and July 1885. It described itself as 'the recognised industrial journal of the organised trades of the United Kingdom'.

The paper's initial editor was George Shipton, Secretary of the London Trades Council. In February 1884 Shipton was replaced by William Barnett, who edited it until its closure.

The paper was published every Saturday and sold for one penny. Each edition consisted of eight pages.

The paper is principally remembered for publishing a number of articles by Frederick Engels. Engels ceased to be a contributor after Shipton complained that an article by Karl Kautsky was "too strong"; Engels remarked that as some of his own articles would be even stronger, it would be best if he did not submit further articles.

== The Labour Standard online ==
- "A Fair Day's Wages for a Fair Day's Work" Fredrick Engels No. 1 7 May 1881
- "The Wages System" Fredrick Engels No. 3, 21 May 1881
- "Trades Unions, part 1 & part 2" Fredrick Engels No. 4, 28 May, & No. 5, 4 June 1881
- "The French Commercial Treaty" Fredrick Engels No. 7, 18 June 1881
- "Two Model Town Councils" Fredrick Engels No. 8, 25 June 1881
- "American Food and the Land Question" Fredrick Engels No. 9, 2 July 1881
- "The Wages Theory of the Anti-Corn Law League" Fredrick Engels No. 10, 9 July 1881
- "A Working Men's Party" Fredrick Engels No. 12, 23 July 1881
- "Bismarck and the German Working Men's Party" Fredrick Engels No. 12, 23 July 1881
- "Cotton and Iron" Fredrick Engels No. 13, 30 July 1881
- "Social Classes — Necessary and Superfluous No. 14, 6 August 1881
