= Robert Lowe =

British Liberal politician (1811–1892)

The Right Honourable The Viscount Sherbrooke GCB PC
- Lowe c. 1873

Chancellor of the Exchequer
- In office 9 December 1868 – 11 August 1873
- Monarch: Victoria
- Prime Minister: William Ewart Gladstone
- Preceded by: George Ward Hunt
- Succeeded by: William Ewart Gladstone

Home Secretary
- In office 9 August 1873 – 20 February 1874
- Monarch: Victoria
- Prime Minister: William Ewart Gladstone
- Preceded by: Henry Bruce
- Succeeded by: R. A. Cross

Personal details
- Born: 4 December 1811 Bingham, Nottinghamshire
- Died: 27 July 1892 (aged 80)
- Party: Liberal
- Spouses: Georgiana Orred (d. 1884); Caroline Anne Sneyd (d. 1914)
- Education: University College, Oxford

Robert Lowe, 1st Viscount Sherbrooke, GCB, PC (4 December 1811 – 27 July 1892), was a British statesman and Liberal politician who helped shape British politics in the latter half of the 19th century. He held office under William Ewart Gladstone as Chancellor of the Exchequer between 1868 and 1873 and as Home Secretary between 1873 and 1874. Lowe is remembered for his work in education policy, his opposition to electoral reform and his contribution to modern UK company law. Gladstone appointed Lowe as Chancellor expecting him to hold down public spending. Public spending rose, and Gladstone pronounced Lowe "wretchedly deficient"; most historians agree. Lowe repeatedly underestimated the revenue, enabling him to resist demands for tax cuts and to reduce the national debt instead. He insisted that the tax system be fair to all classes. By his own main criterion of fairness — that the balance between direct and indirect taxation remain unchanged — he succeeded. Even in his time, however, this concept of fiscal incidence was obsolescent.

== Early life ==
Lowe was born in Bingham, Nottinghamshire, England, the second son of the Reverend Robert Lowe (rector of St Mary and All Saints, Bingham). His mother was Ellen, the daughter of the Rev. Reginald Pyndar. Lowe had albinism, and his sight was so weak that initially it was thought he was unfit to be sent to school.

In 1822, he went to a school at Southwell, then Latin House, Risley, and in 1825 to Winchester as a commoner. In Lowe's fragment of autobiography he shows an unpleasing picture of the under-feeding and other conditions of the school life of the time. The languages of Latin and Greek were the main subjects of study and Lowe records that both were easy for him.

Lowe then attended University College, Oxford, and enjoyed the change; there as a pupil of Benjamin Jowett he gained a first class degree in Literae Humaniores and a second class in mathematics, besides taking a leading part in the Union debates.

In 1835, he won a fellowship at Magdalen, but vacated it on marrying, on 26 March 1836, Georgiana Orred (d. 1884). Lowe was for a few years a successful tutor at Oxford, but in 1838 was disappointed at not being elected to the professorship of Greek at the University of Glasgow.

== Australia ==
In 1841 Lowe moved to London to read for the Bar, but his eyesight showed signs of serious weakness, and, acting on medical advice, he sailed to Sydney in the colony of New South Wales, where he set to work in the law courts. On 7 November 1843 he was nominated by Sir George Gipps, the Governor of New South Wales, to a seat in the New South Wales Legislative Council replacing Robert Jones who had to resign from the Council due to insolvency.

Owing to a difference of opinion with Gipps, Lowe resigned from the council on 9 September 1844, but was elected in April 1845 for Counties of St Vincent and Auckland. Lowe held that seat until 20 June 1848 and was elected for City of Sydney in July 1848, a seat he held until November 1849.

Lowe soon made his mark in the political world by his clever speeches, particularly on finance and education; and besides obtaining a large legal practice, he was involved with the founding and was one of the principal writers for the Atlas newspaper.

In 1844, Lowe defended a Royal Navy captain, John Knatchbull, on a charge of murdering a widowed shopkeeper named Ellen Jamieson; he was one of the earliest to raise in a British court the plea of moral insanity (unsuccessfully). Knatchbull was hanged on 13 February 1844. Lowe and his wife adopted Mrs. Jamieson's two orphaned children, Bobby and Polly Jamieson.

On 27 January 1850, the Lowes and the two Jamieson children sailed to England.

== British politics ==
=== Early years ===
Lowe's previous university reputation and connections combined with his colonial experience stood him in good stead; The Times was glad to employ him, and, as one of its ablest leader-writers, he made his influence widely felt. In 1852, he was returned to Parliament for Kidderminster in the Liberal interest. In the House of Commons, his acute reasoning made a considerable impression, and, under successive Liberal ministries (1853–1858), he obtained official experience as Secretary to the Board of Control and Vice-President of the Board of Trade. During his time there, he saw the Joint Stock Companies Act 1856 passed – the first nationwide codification of company law in the world. He has been referred to as "the father of modern company law". This status was again referred to in the presentation by Lord Sainsbury of the second reading leading up to the new United Kingdom Companies Act 2006:

One hundred and fifty years ago, my predecessor Robert Lowe, later First Viscount Sherbrooke, brought forward the Bill that created the joint stock limited liability company. It was the first nationwide codification of company law in the world, and he has recently been described as "the father of modern company law". Our company law continues to have an excellent record. Since 1997 new incorporations have risen by over 60 per cent and the number of foreign firms incorporating in the UK has more than quadrupled. No doubt this is because, according to the World Bank's assessment, it is quicker and cheaper for companies to set up in the UK than in any other EU member state.

In 1859, Lowe went to the Education Office as Vice-President of the Committee of the Council on Education in Lord Palmerston's ministry; there he pursued a vigorous policy, insisting on payment by results, and bringing in the revised code (1862), which embodied this principle and made an examination in "the three R's" the test for grants of public money. He felt then, and still more after the Reform Act 1867, that "we must educate our masters," and he rather scandalized his old university friends by the stress he laid on physical science as opposed to classical studies. Considerable opposition was aroused by the new regime at the Education Office, and, in 1864, Lowe was driven to resign by an adverse vote in Parliament with reference to the way in which inspectors' reports were "edited." This was the result of the strong feelings that had been aroused against Lingen's administration of the Education Office.

=== Reform ===
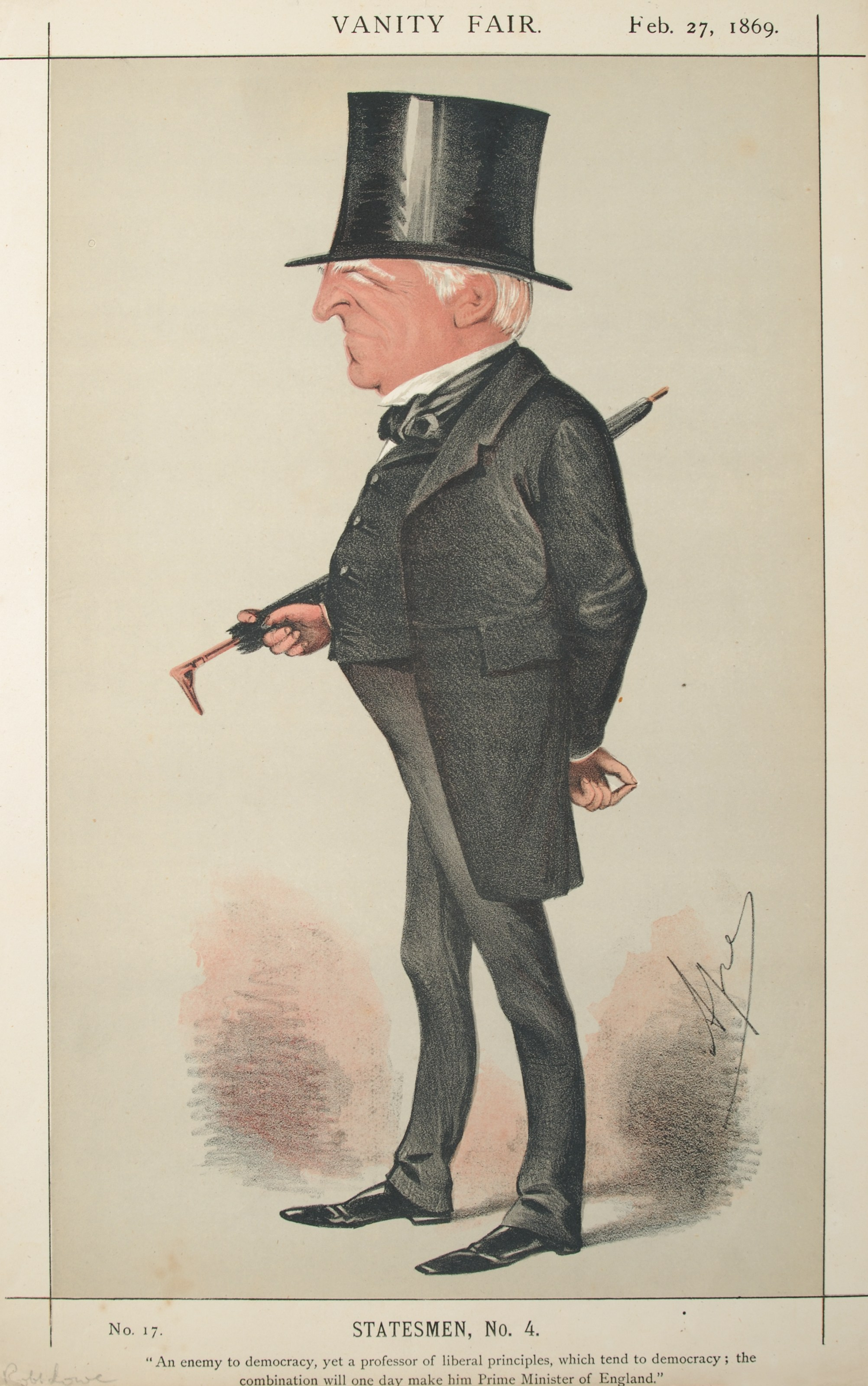
Robert Lowe, Vanity Fair, 1869

Lord Palmerston had been a towering opponent to widening democratic participation and his death in October 1865 opened the way to the Russell–Gladstone reform ministry, which introduced the Reform Bill of 1866. Lowe carried on his former Prime Minister's views, as part of the Canning and Peel Liberal school. Moreover, he had been heavily shocked by his experiences of the comparatively developed union movement in his time in Australia in a less rigid class system. He had already made known his objections to the advance of "democracy", notably in his speech in 1865 on Sir Edward Baines's Borough Franchise Bill. He was not invited to join the new ministry. Lowe retired into what Bright called the "Cave of Adullam", and with other Liberals and Whig peers (known collectively as the 'Adullamites' ) opposed the bill in a series of brilliant speeches, which raised his reputation as an orator to its highest point and helped to cause government's downfall.

However, Benjamin Disraeli who led the subsequent Conservative government proposed his own Reform Bill, which by splitting the parties succeeded to become the Reform Act 1867. As he said in the third reading of the Bill, Lowe thought any step towards democracy was bad because it engendered "a right existing in the individual as opposed to general expediency… numbers as against wealth and intellect". So the bill contained "the terms of endless agitation".

Proponents of the Bill argued a lower property qualification would give the vote to respectable members of the working class. But Lowe thought:

the elite of the working classes you are so fond of, are members of trades unions... founded on principles of the most grinding tyranny not so much against masters as against each other... It was only necessary that you should give them the franchise, to make those trades unions the most dangerous political agencies that could be conceived; because they were in the hands, not of individual members, but of designing men, able to launch them in solid mass against the institutions of the country.

Being a man of company law, Robert Lowe saw unions as a threat to the order, which as he drafted, allowed only for social participation through investment of capital, not investment of labour. As it was the case that participation in Parliament was also only possible through possession of property, Lowe was fearful that a change in one part of the world he understood would lead to another, ending in unforeseeable chaos.

This principle of equality which you have taken to worship, is a very jealous power; she cannot be worshipped by halves, and like the Turk in this respect, she brooks no rival near the throne. When you get a democratic basis for your institutions, you must remember that you cannot look at that alone, but you must look at it in reference to all your other institutions. When you have once taught the people to entertain the notion of the individual rights of every citizen to share in the Government, and the doctrine of popular supremacy, you impose on yourselves the task of re-modelling the whole of your institutions, in reference to the principles that you have set up...

Lowe concluded his speech with considerable flair.

You must take education up the very first question, and you must press it on without delay for the peace of the country. Sir, I was looking to-day at the head of the lion which was sculptured in Greece during her last agony after the battle of Chaeronea, to commemorate that event, and I admired the power and the spirit which portrayed in the face of that noble beast the rage, the disappointment, and the scorn of a perishing nation and of a down-trodden civilization, and I said to myself, "O for an orator, O for an historian, O for a poet, who would do the same thing for us!" We also have had our battle of Chaeronea; we too have had our dishonest victory. That England, that was wont to conquer other nations, has now gained a shameful victory over herself; and oh! that a man would rise in order that he might set forth in words that could not die, the shame, the rage, the scorn, the indignation, and the despair with which this measure is viewed by every cultivated Englishman who is not a slave to the trammels of party, or who is not dazzled by the glare of a temporary and ignoble success!

=== Gladstone Ministry ===
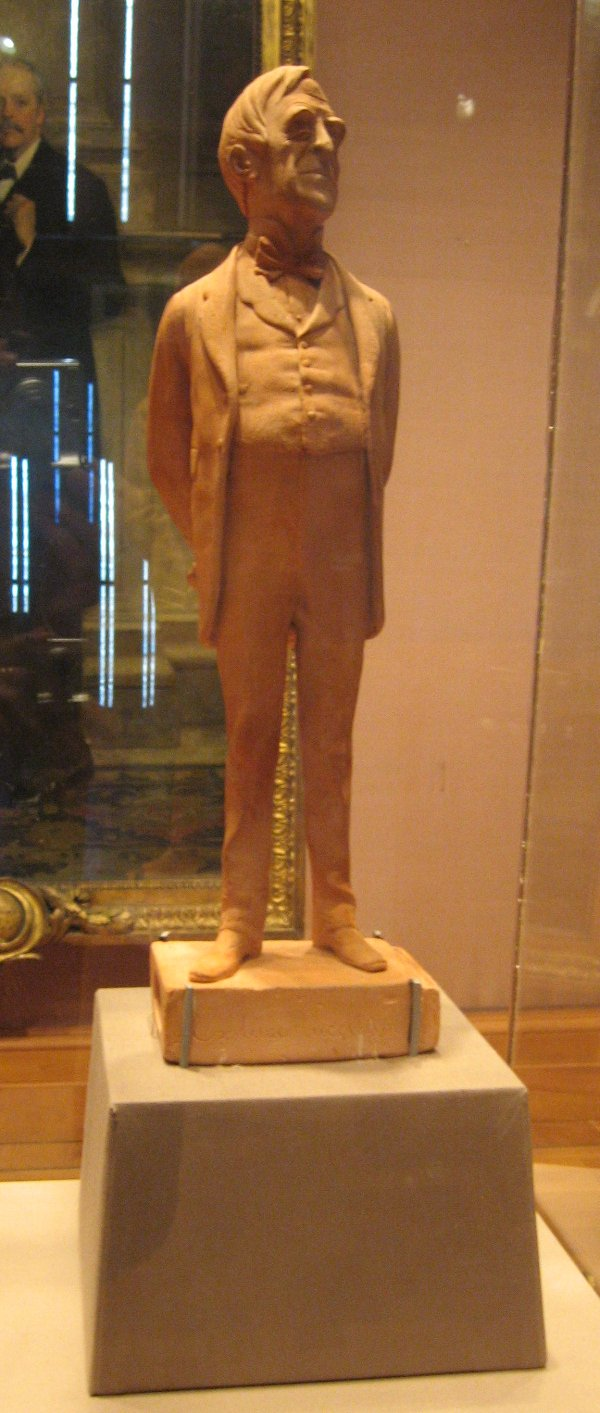
A terracotta statuette dated 1873 by caricaturist Carlo Pellegrini of Lowe standing on a box of matches inscribed 'Ex luce lucellum'

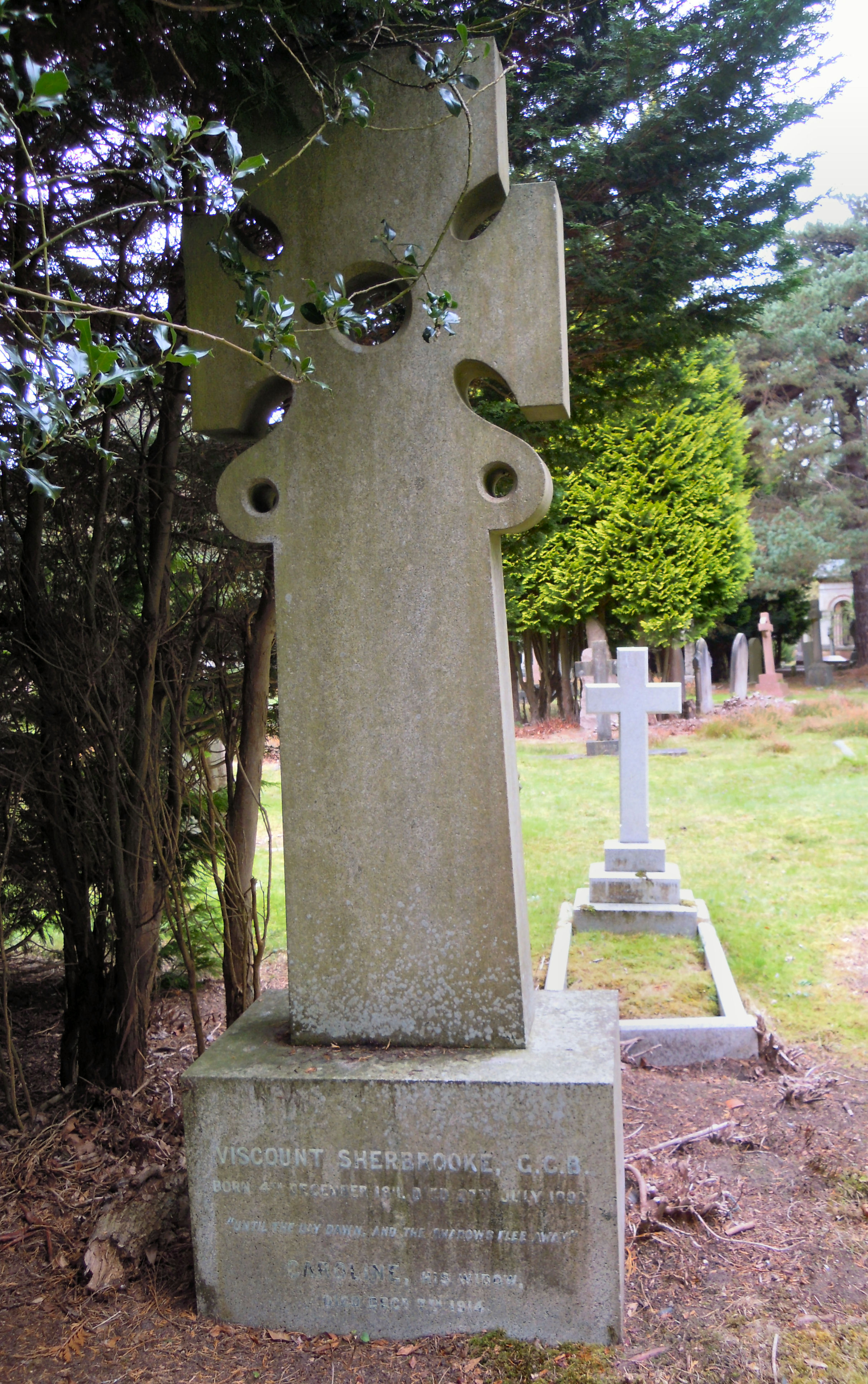
Lowe's grave in Brookwood Cemetery

In spite of the fact that his appeals did not prevent the passing of the Second Reform Act, Robert Lowe beat Walter Bagehot in the next election to become the first Member of Parliament (MP) for the London University, a new constituency created by the very Act he opposed. In 1868 he accepted office in the Gladstone Cabinet as Chancellor of the Exchequer, an office that he described in the following terms in the House of Commons on 11 April 1870: "The Chancellor of the Exchequer is a man whose duties make him more or less of a taxing machine. He is entrusted with a certain amount of misery which it is his duty to distribute as fairly as he can."

Lowe was a rather cut-and-dried economist, who prided himself that during his four years of office he took twelve millions off taxation; but later opinion has hardly accepted his removal of the shilling registration duty on corn (1869) as good statesmanship, and his failures are remembered rather than his successes. His proposed tax of a halfpenny a box on Lucifer matches in 1871 (for which he suggested the epigram ex luce lucellum, "out of light a little profit") roused a storm of opposition, and had to be dropped. In 1873 he was transferred to the Home Office, but in 1874 the government resigned.

== Later years ==
Lowe spoke against the Royal Titles Bill 1876 at East Retford and implied that Queen Victoria had been responsible for the bill's introduction. As a result, when the Liberals returned to power in 1880, Victoria made it clear that she would not accept any ministry that included Lowe. Nevertheless, he was raised to the peerage as Viscount Sherbrooke, of Sherbrooke in the County of Surrey (a peerage that would become extinct on his death), against the express wishes of Queen Victoria, but with the backing of William Gladstone. In 1885, he was also further honoured by being created Knight Grand Cross of the Order of the Bath. But from 1875 till his death at Warlingham, Surrey, his health was constantly failing, and by degrees he figured less and less in public life. He became a supporter of the Liberal Unionist party in 1886.

During the 1870s the following epitaph was suggested for him by one of the wits of his day:

Here lies poor old Robert Lowe;
Where he's gone to I don't know;
If to the realms of peace and love,
Farewell to happiness above;
If, haply, to some lower level,
We can't congratulate the devil.

Lowe was delighted with this, and promptly translated it into Latin, as follows:

Continentur hac in fossa
Humilis Roberti ossa;
Si ad coelum evolabit,
Pax in coelo non restabit;
Sin in inferis jacebit,
Diabolum ejus poenitebit.

On his death he was buried in Brookwood Cemetery.

== Australian federal electoral division ==
The Division of Lowe, a now abolished Australian electoral division located in Sydney, was named after him.

== Arms ==
Coat of arms of Robert Lowe
Crest In front a wolf’s head erased Proper gorged with a collar gemel Or two mullets also Or pierced Gules. Escutcheon Gules three mullets fesswise Argent pierced of the field between two wolves passant of the second. Supporters On the dexter side a wolf Proper and on the sinister side a bay horse each gorged with a chain and therefrom suspended a portcullis Or. Motto Ne Quid Nimis

== See also ==
- Liberal Party (UK)
- Reform Act 1867
- UK company law

== Bibliography ==
=== Own works ===
- Poems of a Life (1884)

=== Sources ===
- Briggs, Asa. “Robert Lowe and the Fear of Democracy," in Briggs, Victorian People (1955) pp. 232–263. online
- Knight, R. (1966). Illiberal Liberal – Robert Lowe in New South Wales, 1842–1850. Melbourne University Press.
- Maloney, John (2006). "Gladstone's Gladstone? The Chancellorship of Robert Lowe, 1868–73". Historical Research. 79 (205): 404–428. doi:10.1111/j.1468-2281.2006.00384.x.
- Martin, Arthur Patchett (1889). "Robert Lowe, Viscount Sherbrooke, in Sydney". Australia and the Empire. pp. 1–29. Wikidata Q107340676.
- Martin, A.Patchett (1893). Life and Letters of the Rt Hon Robert Lowe, Viscount Sherbrooke. Vol. 2 Vols. London.
- Marcham, A.J. (1973). "Educating our masters: political parties and elementary education 1867 to 1870". British Journal of Educational Studies. 21 (2): 180–191. doi:10.1080/00071005.1973.9973377.

New South Wales Legislative Council
Preceded by Richard Jones	Appointed member 7 November 1843 – 9 September 1844	Succeeded by John Lamb
Preceded by John Coghill	Member for Counties of St Vincent and Auckland; April 1845 – June 1848	Succeeded by George Hill
Preceded by William Bland	Member for City of Sydney; July 1848 – November 1849; With: William Wentworth	Succeeded by William Bland
Parliament of the United Kingdom
Preceded by John Best	Member of Parliament for Kidderminster; 1852–1859	Succeeded by Alfred Bristow
Preceded by Sir William Williams, Bt	Member of Parliament for Calne; 1859–1868	Succeeded by Lord Edmond Petty-Fitzmaurice
New constituency	Member of Parliament for London University; 1868–1880	Succeeded by Sir John Lubbock, Bt
Political offices
Preceded by Henry Baillie; Charles Bruce	Joint Secretary to the Board of Control; 1852–1855	Succeeded by Henry Danby Seymour
Preceded by Hon. Edward Pleydell-Bouverie	Paymaster General; 1855–1858	Succeeded by The Earl of Donoughmore
Preceded by Hon. Edward Pleydell-Bouverie	Vice-President of the Board of Trade; 1855–1858	Succeeded by The Earl of Donoughmore
Preceded by Charles Adderley	Vice-President of the Committee of the Council on Education; 1859–1864	Succeeded by Henry Bruce
Preceded by George Ward Hunt	Chancellor of the Exchequer; 1868–1873	Succeeded by William Ewart Gladstone
Preceded by Henry Bruce	Home Secretary; 1873–1874	Succeeded by Sir R. A. Cross
Peerage of the United Kingdom
New creation	Viscount Sherbrooke; 1880–1892	Extinct
