= Robert Hartwell =

Robert John Hartwell (1810 – 1875) was a British radical trade unionist and newspaper editor.

Hartwell worked as a compositor, and in his spare time occasionally wrote newspaper articles. In this role, he took part in the "War of the Unstamped" in the early 1830s. He supported the Tolpuddle Martyrs, and was treasurer of the Fund for the Relief of the Dorchester Labourers. He joined the London Working Men's Association in 1836, and in 1837 chaired the meeting at which the People's Charter was originally proposed. In 1839, he edited The Charter newspaper, in support of the movement, but he soon left political activity.

In 1861, Hartwell worked with George Potter to establish The Bee-Hive, a newspaper which supported trade unionism. The main contributor to the newspaper, he was also its editor from 1863. He also chaired the first meeting of the Reform League, in 1865.

Hartwell announced that he would contest Lambeth as an independent workingmen's candidate, but he withdrew before the poll was taken.

Media offices
Preceded by George Troup	Editor of The Bee-Hive; 1863–1870	Succeeded by Henry Solly
