= Edmond Beales =

British political activist (1803–1881)

Edmond Beales (1803–1881) was an English radical and judge. He was the President of the Reform League and was a central figure in the 19th century British reform movement.

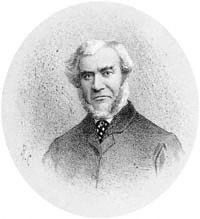
Edmond Beales

== Biography ==
Edmond Beales was the son of Samuel Pickering Beales, a merchant of Newnham, Cambridgeshire and was born on 3 July 1803. He was educated at Eton and Trinity College, Cambridge, gaining a B.A. in 1825 and an M.A. in 1828. He became a barrister in 1830. He married Elizabeth, the daughter of James Marshall, manager of the Provincial Bank of Ireland.

Beales is best known as the President of the Reform League who campaigned for representation of the working classes in parliament and whose efforts culminated in the Reform Act 1867. The League is principally remembered for two great demonstrations in Hyde Park both of which were banned by the Government. At the first, on 23 July 1866, the League resolved to assemble at Marble Arch outside the Park and attempt to enter. A massive crowd assembled at the Arch and Beales attempted to enter the Park. The police prevented this amid scuffles. Part of the crowd then pulled down the railings and entered the Park. Three days of what are variously described as "skirmishes" or "riots" ensued. The disturbances ceased after Beales met with the Home Secretary and offered to talk the revellers into leaving the Park.

The second great Hyde Park rally was on 6 May 1867. The rally was again banned by the Government but they were unable to stop it taking place due to the massive numbers who turned out. The procession started off from the Reform League's headquarters, at 8 Adelphi Terrace, headed by a cab containing Beales, his friend Colonel Dickson and a few other aristocratic supporters. As they headed up Regent Street it was decided that these gentlemen would visit Gunter's Tea Shop in Berkeley Square and so left the procession. This left John Bedford Leno and a few others, at the head of the procession who proceeded to face the police at Marble Arch and to hold the famous 1867 Hyde Park demonstration.

As a result of his participation in the Hyde Park rally, Beales was deprived of his appointment as one of the revising barristers for Middlesex. It was said that 'he lost his practice, his office, his voice, his health in the people's cause.'" By way of compensation, Lord Chancellor Hatherley appointed Beales to a County Court judgeship in 1870, which provoked protests.

Edmond died at Osborne House, Bolton Gardens South, Brompton, Middlesex on 26 June 1881.

== Career ==
- 25 Jun 1830 - Barrister M.T. (Conveyancer)
- 1862-66 - Revising Barrister for Middlesex
- 1863 - President of National League for Independence of Poland
- ???? - Chairman of Circassian Committee
- 1865-69 - President of the Reform League
- 1868 - Parliamentary Candidate for Tower Hamlets
- 1870-81 - Judge for county courts of Beds and Cambs
