= Alick Osborne =

Irish-Australian politician (1792/93–1856)

Alick Osborne (1792 or 1793 – 12 March 1856) was an Irish-born Australian politician.

He was born at Dirnaseer in County Tyrone to Archie Osborne; He was a ship's surgeon in the Royal Navy and then a pastoralist in the Illawarra. Osborne was elected to the New South Wales Legislative Council as the member for the Counties of Murray and St Vincent from 1851 to 1855. His brother, Henry, would also serve in the New South Wales Parliament.

After resigning his seat in January 1855, he left for Europe. He died at Omagh, Ireland on 12 March 1856 (aged 63).
