= Reform Act 1867 =

Act of the Parliament of the United Kingdom concerning elections in England and Wales

Representation of the People Act 1867 (Note: Section 1.)
- Act of Parliament
- Parliament of the United Kingdom
- Long title: An Act further to amend the Laws relating to the Representation of the People in England and Wales.
- Citation: 30 & 31 Vict. c. 102
- Territorial extent: England and Wales (Note: Section 2.)

Dates
- Royal assent: 15 August 1867
- Commencement: 1 January 1868 (Note: Section 3.)
Other legislation
Amended by	Statute Law Revision Act 1875; Representation of the People Act 1918; Rating and Valuation Act 1925; Local Government Act 1948; Representation of the People Act 1949; Fixed-term Parliaments Act 2011; Dissolution and Calling of Parliament Act 2022
Relates to	Representation of the People (Scotland) Act 1868; Representation of the People (Ireland) Act 1868; Reform Act 1884

Status: Amended

Text of statute as originally enacted

Revised text of statute as amended

Text of the Representation of the People Act 1867 as in force today (including any amendments) within the United Kingdom, from legislation.gov.uk.

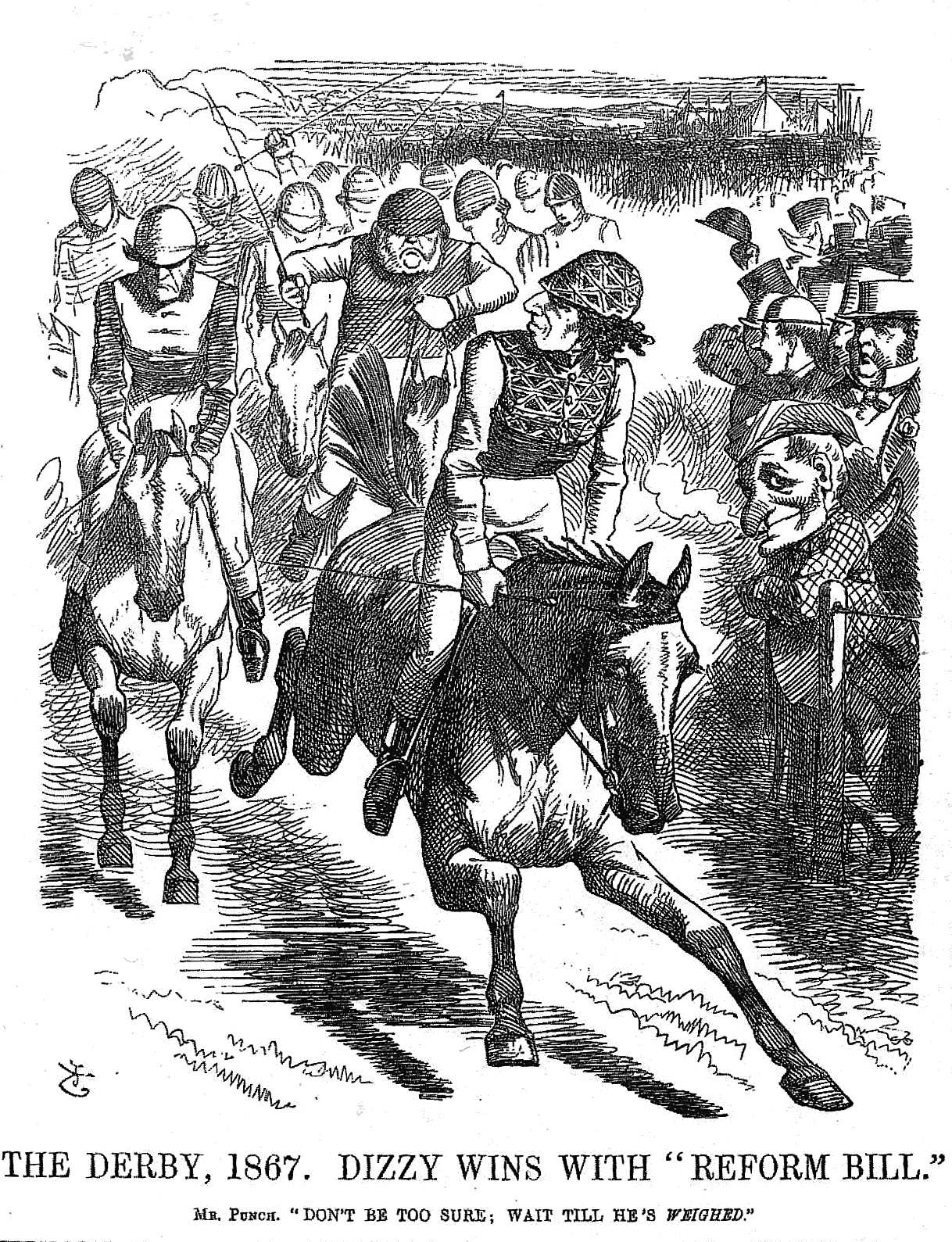
Contemporary cartoon of Mr Punch (right) observing as Disraeli outpaces Gladstone (left) and John Bright (behind him) at the Derby, parodying the perceived victor in debates in a split Liberal-led Commons while Disraeli's fellow Conservative, Lord Derby led as Prime Minister from the House of Lords.

The Representation of the People Act 1867 (30 & 31 Vict. c. 102), known as the Reform Act 1867 or the Second Reform Act, is an act of the Parliament of the United Kingdom that enfranchised part of the urban male working class in England and Wales for the first time, extending the franchise from landowners of freehold property above a certain value, to leaseholders and rental tenants as well. It took effect in stages over the next two years, culminating in full commencement on 1 January 1869.

Before the act, one million of the seven million adult men in England and Wales could vote; the act immediately doubled that number. Further, by the end of 1868 all male heads of household could vote, having abolished the widespread mechanism of the deemed rentpayer or ratepayer being a superior lessor or landlord who would act as middleman for the money paid ("compounding"). The act introduced a near-negligible redistribution of seats, far short of the urbanisation and population growth since 1832.

The intent of the bill was to help the Conservative Party, Benjamin Disraeli expecting a reward to his party for the sweeping reforms, yet they resulted in his government's defeat in the 1868 general election.

== Background ==
For the decades after the Representation of the People Act 1832 (2 & 3 Will. 4. c. 45) (the First Reform Act), cabinets (in that era leading from both Houses) had resisted attempts to push through further reform, and in particular left unfulfilled the six demands of the Chartist movement. After 1848, this movement declined rapidly, but elite opinion began to pay attention. It was thus only 27 years after the initial, quite modest, Great Reform Act 1832 that leading politicians thought it prudent to introduce further electoral reform. Following an unsuccessful attempt by Benjamin Disraeli to introduce a reform bill in 1859, Lord John Russell, who had played a major role in passing the Reform Act 1832, attempted this in 1860; but the Prime Minister, Lord Palmerston, a fellow Liberal, was against any further electoral reform.

The Union victory in the American Civil War in 1865 emboldened the forces in Britain that demanded more democracy and public input into the political system, to the dismay of the upper class landed gentry who identified with the US Southern States planters and feared the loss of influence and a popular radical movement. Influential commentators included Walter Bagehot, Thomas Carlyle, Anthony Trollope, Karl Marx and John Stuart Mill. Proponents used two arguments: the balance of the constitution and "moral right". They emphasized that deserving, skilled, sober, thrifty, and deferential artisans deserve the franchise. Liberal William Gladstone emphasized the "moral" improvement of working men and felt that they should therefore have the opportunity of "demonstrating their allegiance to their betters". However the opposition warned against the "low-class democracy" of the United States and the Australian Colonies.

Palmerston's death in 1865 opened the floodgates for reform. In 1866 Russell (Earl Russell as he had been since 1861, and now Prime Minister for the second time), introduced a Reform Bill. It was a cautious bill, which proposed to enfranchise "respectable" working men, excluding unskilled workers and what was known as the "residuum", those that the MPs of the time described as feckless and criminal poor. This was ensured by a £7 annual rent qualification to vote—or 2 shillings and 9 pence (2s 9d) a week. (Note: £137 per week or £594 per month in present terms based on CPI inflation) This entailed two "fancy franchises", emulating measures of 1854, a £10 lodger qualification for the boroughs, and a £50 savings qualification in the counties. Liberals claimed that "the middle classes, strengthened by the best of the artisans, would still have the preponderance of power".

When it came to the vote, however, this bill split the Liberal Party: a split partly engineered by Benjamin Disraeli, who incited those threatened by the bill to rise up against it. On one side were the reactionary conservative Liberals, known as the Adullamites; on the other were pro-reform Liberals who supported the Government. The Adullamites were supported by Tories and the liberal Whigs were supported by radicals and reformists.

The bill was thus defeated and the Liberal government of Russell resigned.

== Birth of the act ==
The Conservatives formed a ministry on 26 June 1866, led by Lord Derby as Prime Minister and Disraeli as Chancellor of the Exchequer. They were faced with the challenge of reviving Conservatism: Henry John Temple, 3rd Viscount Palmerston, the powerful Liberal leader, was dead and the Liberal Party was split and defeated. Thanks to manoeuvring by Disraeli, Derby's Conservatives saw an opportunity to be a strong, viable party of government; however, there was still a Liberal majority in the House of Commons.

The Adullamites, led by Robert Lowe, had already been working closely with the Conservative Party. The Adullamites were anti-reform, as were the Conservatives, but the Adullamites declined the invitation to enter into Government with the Conservatives as they thought that they could have more influence from an independent position. Despite the fact that he had blocked the Liberal Reform Bill, in February 1867, Disraeli introduced his own Reform Bill into the House of Commons.

By this time the attitude of many in the country had ceased to be apathetic regarding reform of the House of Commons. Huge meetings, especially the ‘Hyde Park riots', and the feeling that many of the skilled working class were respectable, had persuaded many that there should be a Reform Bill. However, wealthy Conservative MP Lord Cranborne resigned his government ministry in disgust at the bill's introduction.

The Reform League, agitating for universal suffrage, became much more active, and organized demonstrations of hundreds of thousands of people in Manchester, Glasgow, and other towns. Though these movements did not normally use revolutionary language as some Chartists had in the 1840s, they were powerful movements. The high point came when a demonstration in May 1867 in Hyde Park was banned by the government. Thousands of troops and policemen were prepared, but the crowds were so huge that the government did not dare to attack. The Home Secretary, Spencer Walpole, was forced to resign.

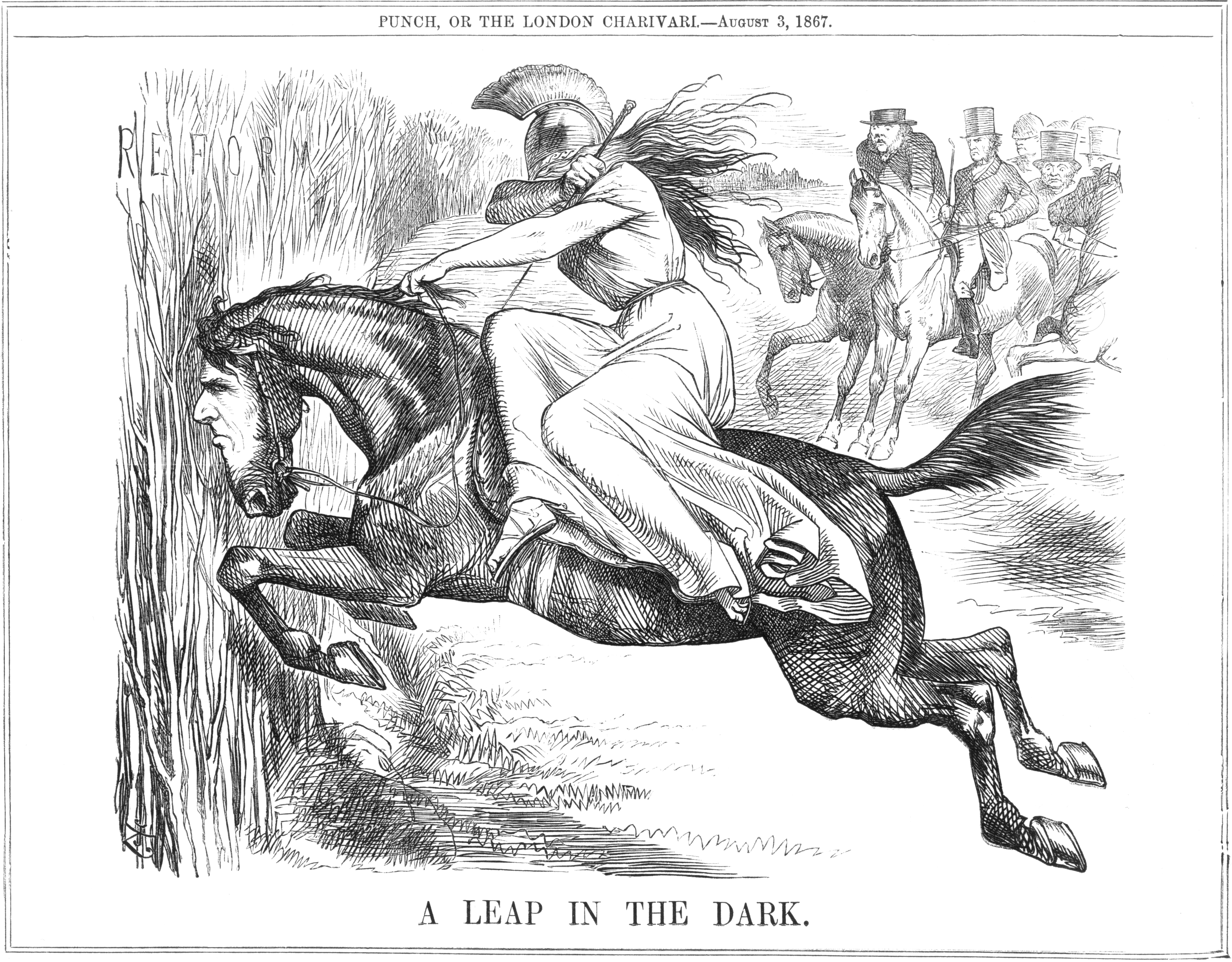
A Punch cartoon from August 1867 portraying Disraeli as a horse, taking Britannia on a leap in the dark

Faced with the possibility of popular revolt going much further, the government rapidly included into the bill amendments which enfranchised far more people. Consequently, the bill was more far-reaching than any Members of Parliament had thought possible or really wanted; Disraeli appeared to accept most reform proposals, so long as they did not come from Gladstone. An amendment tabled by the opposition (but not by Gladstone himself) trebled the new number entitled to vote under the bill; yet Disraeli simply accepted it. The bill enfranchised most men who lived in urban areas. The final proposals were as follows: a borough franchise for all who paid rates in person (that is, not compounders), men who paid more than £10 rent per year, and extra votes for graduates, professionals and those with over £50 savings. These last "fancy franchises" were seen by Conservatives as a weapon against a mass electorate.

However, Gladstone attacked the bill; a series of sparkling parliamentary debates with Disraeli resulted in the bill becoming much more radical. Having been given his chance by the belief that Gladstone's bill had gone too far in 1866, Disraeli had now gone further.

Disraeli was able to persuade his party to vote for the bill on the basis that the newly enfranchised electorate would be grateful and would vote Conservative at the next election. Despite this prediction, in 1868 the Conservatives lost the first general election in which the newly enfranchised electors voted.

The bill ultimately aided the rise of the radical wing of the Liberal Party and helped Gladstone to victory. The Act was tidied up with many further Acts to alter electoral boundaries.

== Provisions of the act ==
=== Reduced representation ===
==== Disenfranchised boroughs ====
Four electoral boroughs were disenfranchised by the act, for corruption:

- Totnes, Devon
- Great Yarmouth, Norfolk
- Lancaster, Lancashire
- Reigate, Surrey

Seven English boroughs were disenfranchised by the Representation of the People (Scotland) Act 1868 the next year:

- Arundel, Sussex
- Ashburton, Devon
- Dartmouth, Devon
- Honiton, Devon
- Lyme Regis, Dorset
- Thetford, Norfolk
- Wells, Somerset

==== Halved representation ====
The following boroughs were reduced from electing two MPs to one:

- Andover, Hampshire
- Bodmin, Cornwall
- Bridgnorth, Shropshire
- Bridport, Dorset
- Buckingham, Buckinghamshire
- Chichester, Sussex
- Chippenham, Wiltshire
- Cirencester, Gloucestershire
- Cockermouth, Cumberland
- Devizes, Wiltshire
- Dorchester, Dorset
- Evesham, Worcestershire
- Guildford, Surrey
- Harwich, Essex
- Hertford, Hertfordshire
- Huntingdon, Huntingdonshire
- Knaresborough, West Riding of Yorkshire
- Leominster, Herefordshire
- Lewes, Sussex
- Lichfield, Staffordshire
- Ludlow, Shropshire
- Lymington, Hampshire
- Maldon, Essex
- Marlow, Buckinghamshire
- Malton, North Riding of Yorkshire
- Marlborough, Wiltshire
- Newport, Isle of Wight
- Poole, Dorset
- Richmond, North Riding of Yorkshire
- Ripon, West Riding of Yorkshire
- Stamford, Lincolnshire
- Tavistock, Devon
- Tewkesbury, Gloucestershire
- Windsor, Berkshire
- Wycombe, Buckinghamshire

Three further boroughs (Honiton, Thetford, Wells) were also due to have their representation halved under the 1867 act, but before this reduction took effect they were disenfranchised altogether by the 1868 Scottish Reform Act as noted above.

=== Enfranchisements ===
The Act created nine new single-member borough seats:

- Burnley, Lancashire
- Darlington, County Durham
- Dewsbury, West Riding of Yorkshire
- Gravesend, Kent
- Hartlepool, County Durham
- Middlesbrough, North Riding of Yorkshire
- Stalybridge, Cheshire
- Stockton, County Durham
- Wednesbury, Staffordshire

The following two boroughs were enfranchised with two MPs:

- Chelsea, Middlesex
- Hackney, Middlesex

The following two were enlarged:

- Salford and Merthyr Tydfil were given two MPs, up from one.
- Birmingham, Leeds, Liverpool and Manchester now had three MPs, up from two.

=== Other changes ===
- The West Riding of Yorkshire divided into three districts each returning two MPs.
- Cheshire, Derbyshire, Devonshire, Essex, Kent, Lincolnshire, Norfolk, Somerset, Staffordshire and Surrey divided into three districts instead of two, each returning two MPs.
- Lancashire divided into four two-member districts instead of a three-member district and a two-member district.
- University of London was given one seat.
- Parliament was allowed to continue sitting through a Demise of the Crown.
- MPs exempted from having to seek re-election upon changing offices.
- Fourteen districts electing more than two members were switched from plurality block voting to limited voting, which they used until 1885. Birmingham and 12 other districts elected 3, and each voter cast up to two votes. The City of London riding elected four and each voter cast up to three votes. The use of limited voting mostly prevented a clean sweep of district seats by one party (although on two occasions a one-party sweep happened).

== Reforms in Scotland and Ireland ==
The reforms for Scotland and Ireland were carried out by two subsequent acts, the Representation of the People (Ireland) Act 1868 and the Representation of the People (Scotland) Act 1868.

In Scotland, five existing constituencies gained members, and three new constituencies were formed. Two existing county constituencies were merged into one, giving an overall increase of seven members; this was offset by seven English boroughs (listed above) being disenfranchised, leaving the House with the same number of members.

The representation of Ireland remained unchanged.

== Effects ==
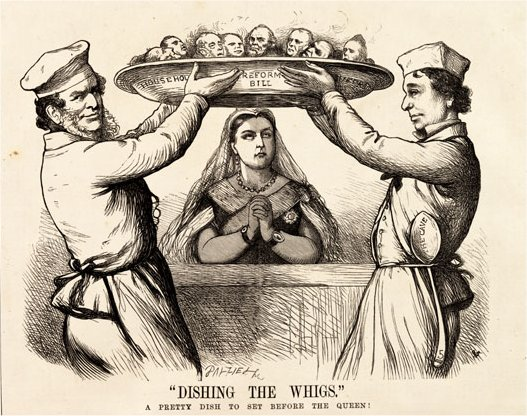
"Dishing the Whigs", Fun cartoon. Lord Derby and Benjamin Disraeli "dish" their Whig opponents by introducing more liberal reforms than they had contemplated; their heads are presented on a platter to Queen Victoria.

=== Direct effects of the act ===
The slur of local bribery and corruption dogged early debates in 1867–68. The whips' and leaders' decision to steer away discussion of electoral malpractice or irregularity to 1868's Election Petitions Act facilitated the progress of the main Reform Act.

The unprecedented extension of the franchise to all householders effectively gave the vote to many working-class men, quite a considerable change. Jonathan Parry described this as a "borough franchise revolution"; Overwhelming election of the landed class or otherwise very wealthy to the Commons would no longer be assured by money, bribery and favours, those elected would reflect the most common sentiment of local units of the public. The brand-new franchise provisions were briefly flawed; the act did not address the issues of compounding and of not being a ratepayer in a household. Compounding (counting of one's under-tenants payments and using that count as a qualification) as to all rates and rents was made illegal, abolished in the enactment of a bill tabled by Liberal Grosvenor Hodgkinson. This meant that all male tenants would have to pay the parish/local rates directly and thus thereafter qualified for the vote.

A 2022 study found that the Act reduced political violence in the UK.

=== Unintended effects ===
Increased amounts of party spending and political organisation at both a local and national level—politicians had to account themselves to the increased electorate, which without secret ballots meant an increased number of voters to treat or bribe.

The redistribution of seats actually served to make the House of Commons increasingly dominated by the upper classes. Only they could afford to pay the huge campaigning costs and the abolition of certain rotten boroughs removed some of the middle-class international merchants who had been able to obtain seats.

The Liberal Party was worried about the prospect of a socialist party taking the bulk of the working-class vote, so they moved to the left, while their rivals the Conservatives initiated occasional intrigues to encourage socialist candidates to stand against the Liberals.

== Reform Act in literature ==
Thomas Carlyle's essay "Shooting Niagara: And After?" compares the Second Reform Act and democracy generally to plunging over Niagara Falls. His essay provoked a response from Mark Twain, "A Day at Niagara" (1869). Trollope's Phineas Finn is concerned almost exclusively with the parliamentary progress of the Second Reform Act, and Finn sits for one of the seven fictional boroughs that are due to be disenfranchised.

== See also ==
- Ballot Act 1872
- Reform Acts
- Representation of the People Act
- Representation of the People Act 1884 (or Third Reform Act)
- Representation of the People Act 1918 (Fourth Reform Act)
- Redistribution of Seats Act 1885
- Benjamin Disraeli
- William Ewart Gladstone
- Chartism
