= Derby–Disraeli ministry =

Derby–Disraeli ministry may refer to three ministries of the United Kingdom of Great Britain and Ireland:

- First Derby–Disraeli ministry, the British government under Lord Derby and Benjamin Disraeli (February–December 1852)
- Second Derby–Disraeli ministry, the British government under Lord Derby and Benjamin Disraeli (1858–1859)
- Third Derby–Disraeli ministry, the British government under Lord Derby and Benjamin Disraeli (1866–1868)

== See also ==
- Derby ministry (disambiguation)
- Disraeli ministry (disambiguation)
