= Sir Robert Warren, 1st Baronet =

Anglo-Irish landowner and businessman

Sir Robert Warren, 1st Baronet JP (20 August 1723 – 1811) was an Anglo-Irish landowner and businessman who owned Warrenscourt House (which was bought by his grandfather, Wallis Warren, in 1703) and Crookstown House (which he inherited from his father's marriage to Anne Crooke) in County Cork.

== Life ==
He was the eldest son of Robert Warren, of Warrenscourt House, and Anne Crooke, a descendant of Sir Thomas Crooke, 1st Baronet, who founded the town of Baltimore, County Cork.

In 1768 he, Richard Tonson, Sir James St Jeffryes and James Bernard founded Tonson's Bank, later to be called Warren's Bank, in Cork. Warren's Bank, which had over £500,000 on its launch in 1768, funded elections and loaned money to contractors in the American War of Independence. Warren's Bank collapsed in September 1784 owing to mismanagement.

In 1750 he was made a Justice of the Peace for County Cork and in 1752 he served as High Sheriff of County Cork. Warren also helped to set up the Muskerry militia and target the Whiteboy movement.

He was made a Baronet, of Warren's Court, on 7 July 1784.

== Children ==
He married, firstly, Mary Carré, daughter of Augustus Carre (or Carey), a wealthy merchant of Cork city, in 1748 and with her had issue:

- Sir Augustus Louis Carré Warren, 2nd Baronet (1754-1821).
- William Warren of Lisgoold, County Cork.
- Thomas Warren (MP for Charleville and Castlebar from 1783-1790).
- John Warren of Codrum House, County Cork.
- Rev. Robert Warren of Crookstown House, County Cork.
- Rev. Edward Warren.
- Mary Warren (who married Daniel Gibbs, J.P., Deputy Governor of County Cork). Her daughter Anne Gibbs married Richard Nettles, J.P., of Nettleville House, County Cork., and was, through her daughter Esther Nettles (who married Rev. Hume Babington), a great-grandmother of Sir Anthony Babington, the Attorney General for Northern Ireland from 1925-1937.
- Rose Warren.
- Charlotte Warren.
- Anne Warren.

He married, secondly, Elizabeth Lawton, daughter of John Lawton, in 1780 and with her had issue:

- Richard Benson Warren, Second Serjeant-at-law (Ireland). One of his daughters, Martha Elinor Warren, married James Robert Stewart, of Gortleitragh House, Dublin, and was the mother of both Robert Warren Stewart and George Francis Stewart.
- Henry Warren, who married Catherine Stewart. His son was Robert Warren, the politician and judge.
- Elizabeth Warren. She married John Bradshaw and her daughter, Mary Anne Bradshaw, married Matthew Barnewall, 6th Viscount Barnewall as his second wife (they had no issue).
- Alice Warren. She married twice, firstly to Rev. John Townsend and secondly to Major Robert Wolseley, having issue from both marriages.

== Ancestry ==
Through his great-great-great-grandfather, Sir George Shurley, Lord Chief Justice of Ireland, he was a direct descendant of Sir William Boleyn and his wife Lady Margaret Butler through their daughter Margaret Boleyn, an aunt of Anne Boleyn. Margaret Boleyn had married John Sackville, whose daughter Anne Sackville, a first cousin to Anne Boleyn, married Sir Nicholas Pelham. One of Sir Nicholas Pelham's daughters with Anne Sackville, Anne Pelham, had married Thomas Shurley and was the mother of Sir George Shirley.

Ancestors of Sir Robert Warren, 1st Baronet

4. Wallis Warren
2. Robert Warren of Warrenscourt House
5. Elizabeth Knolles
1. Sir Robert Warren, 1st Baronet
24. Sir Samuel Crooke, 2nd Baronet
12. Sir Thomas Crooke, 3rd Baronet
25. Judith Shurley (daughter of Sir George Shurley)
6. Thomas Crooke
13. Ellen MacDermot MacCarthy
3. Anne Crooke
14. William Field (Mayor of Cork)
7. Alice Field
30. Henry Becher
15. Susannah Becher
31. Elizabeth Note

Baronetage of Ireland
New creation	Baronet (of Warren's Court); 1784–1811	Succeeded by Augustus Louis Carre Warren
