= Warren baronets of Warren's Court (1784) =

Dormant baronetcy in Ireland

Escutcheon of the Warren baronets of Warren's Court

The Warren baronetcy, of Warren's Court in the County of Cork, was created in the Baronetage of Ireland on 7 July 1784 for Robert Warren, High Sheriff of County Cork in 1752.

The 5th Baronet served in the Crimean War and in the Indian Rebellion of 1857 and was High Sheriff of County Cork in 1867. The 8th Baronet was a colonel in the Royal Army Service Corps and served as Chief Constable of Buckinghamshire in 1928.

As of 2026 the title is marked dormant on the Official Roll of the Baronetage.

== Warren baronets, of Warren's Court (1784) ==
- Sir Robert Warren, 1st Baronet (1723–1811)
- Sir Augustus Louis Carré Warren, 2nd Baronet (1754–1821)
- Sir Augustus Warren, 3rd Baronet (1791–1863)
- Sir John Borlase Warren, 4th Baronet (1800–1863)
- Sir Augustus Riversdale Warren, 5th Baronet (1833–1914)
- Sir Augustus Riversdale John Blennerhasset Warren, 6th Baronet (1865–1914)
- Sir Augustus George Digby Warren, 7th Baronet (1898–1958)
- Sir Thomas Richard Pennefather Warren, 8th Baronet (1885–1961)
- Sir (Brian) Charles Pennefather Warren, 9th Baronet (1923–2006)

== Extended family ==
- Thomas Warren, third son of the 1st Baronet, was a Member of the Parliament of Ireland. His sixth son Brisbane Warren was the father of the Very Reverend Thomas Brisbane Warren, Dean of Cork.
- Richard Warren (1828–1913), second son of Rev. Robert Warren, eldest son of Rev. Robert Warren, fifth son of the first baronet, was a major-general in the Royal Engineers.
- Augustus Edmund Warren, second son of Richard Benson Warren, serjeant-at-law, seventh son of the 1st Baronet, was a major-general in the Seaforth Highlanders.
- Robert Warren, eldest son of Captain Henry Warren, eighth son of the 1st Baronet, was a politician and judge.
