= Anne Sackville =

Anne Sackville may refer to:

- Lady Anne Clifford (1590–1676), married name Anne Sackville, wife of the 3rd Earl of Cumberland
- Anne Fiennes (died 1595), née Anne Sackville, daughter of Sir Richard Sackville
- Anne Sackville, Countess of Dorset (died 1618)
