= Anne Dacre =

Anne Dacre may refer to:

- Anne Howard, Countess of Arundel, née Anne Dacre, (1557–1630), English poet, noblewoman, and religious conspirator
- Anne, Lady Dacre (died 1595), English gentlewoman and benefactress
