= John Sackville (died 1557) =

English politician (1484–1557)

- Born: before 17 March 1484
- Died: 26 September 1557
- Spouses: Margaret Jean Boleyn; Anne Torrell
- Children: Sir Richard Sackville Lady Gervase Sachville Wilford; Christopher Sackville; John Sackville; Isabel Sackville; Anne Sackville; Mary Sackville
- Parent(s): Richard Sackville, Isabel Digges

John Sackville MP (before 17 March 1484 – 26 September 1557) was a member of parliament for East Grinstead, and a local administrator in Essex, Sussex and Surrey. His first wife was Margaret Boleyn, they had a illegitimate daughter before they were married named Gervase Sachville. Margaret is an aunt of Henry VIII's second Queen, Anne Boleyn, and a great-aunt of Queen Elizabeth I.

== Family ==
John Sackville, born before 17 March 1484, was the son of Richard Sackville (d. 28 July 1524), esquire, and Isabel Digges, the daughter of John Digges, esquire, of Barham, Kent, by Joan Clifton, the daughter and co-heiress of Sir Gervase Clifton. He was the grandson of Humphrey Sackville (d. 24 January 1489) and Katherine Browne, daughter of Sir Thomas Browne (beheaded 20 July 1460), Treasurer of the Household to King Henry VI, by Eleanor Arundel, and the great-grandson of Edward Sackville (d. 1459) and his wife, Margaret Wakehurst.

Sackville had three brothers and seven sisters:

- Richard Sackville, who married the daughter of Thomas Thatcher, esquire, of Sussex, by whom he had an only daughter, Anne.
- John (or William), a priest.
- Edward Sackville.
- Joan Sackville, who married John Parker, esquire, of Willingdon, East Sussex.
- Mildred Sackville, who married Sir William Fitzwilliam, of Gaynes Park Hall, Essex.
- Mary Sackville, who married Robert Roberts, esquire, of Glastenbury, Kent.
- Catherine Sackville, who married Sir John Baker of Sissinghurst, Kent.
- Margaret Sackville, who married Sir Thomas Palmer.
- Isabel Sackville (d. 21 October 1570), last prioress of St Mary's, Clerkenwell.
- Constance Sackville (d. 29 March 1554), who married firstly, William Heneage (d. 10 June 1525), and secondly Sir Christopher More.

== Career ==
During the early part of his career, Sackville resided and held office in Essex, where he was justice of the peace from 1513 to 1524, and a commissioner for the Subsidy in 1523 and 1524, but after his father's death in 1524 his career was confined to Sussex and Surrey. He was a justice of the peace in Sussex from 1524 until his death, was commissioner for the musters in Sussex in 1539, and served as Sheriff of Sussex and Surrey for two terms, in 1527–28 and 1540–41, before being elected to Parliament for East Grinstead, Sussex in 1542. In 1546–47 he again served as Sheriff of Sussex and Surrey.

Sackville is said to have derived little benefit from his first marriage into the Boleyn family, and to have done 'little on his own account to augment his inheritance'. However his eldest son and heir, Sir Richard Sackville, later became 'notorious' for his 'acquisitiveness', and it may thus have been on Richard's initiative that in 1544 Sackville and his son acquired over £900 worth of former monastic lands in Surrey, Sussex and London, selling them for a profit over the succeeding two years.

Sackville resided for the latter part of his life at Chiddingly, Sussex, where on 1 July 1556 he made his last will, requesting a requiem Mass at his funeral, and bequeathing money to the poor in five villages in Sussex and Mount Bures in Essex. His household goods at Chiddingly were left to his second wife, Anne, with remainder to his three daughters. He left his wife his livestock as well, together with the effects in his house called Buckhurst at Withyham. As executors he appointed his wife and his son-in-law, Sir Nicholas Pelham. Sackville died 26 September 1557, and was buried in the parish church at Withyham on 5 October. For reasons which are unclear, Sackville omitted all mention in his will of his eldest son and heir, Sir Richard Sackville. Sir Richard challenged the will, and was granted administration by the court in October 1559.

== Marriages and issue ==
Sackville married first, by 1507, Margaret Boleyn, the daughter of Sir William Boleyn of Blickling and Margaret Ormond (otherwise Butler) (d. before 20 March 1540), daughter and co-heiress of Thomas Butler, 7th Earl of Ormond (died 3 August 1515), by his first wife, Anne Hankford. Margaret's brother, Thomas Boleyn, 1st Earl of Wiltshire, was the father of King Henry VIII's second queen, Anne Boleyn, and Margaret was thus an aunt of Queen Anne and a great-aunt of Queen Elizabeth I. John Sackville and Margaret Boleyn had three sons and three daughters:

- Sir Richard Sackville (c.1507– 21 April 1566) of Ashburnham and Buckhurst, Sussex, who married Winifred Brydges (d.1586), daughter of Sir John Brydges, draper, Lord Mayor of London in 1520, and his wife, Agnes Ayloffe. They had a son Thomas Sackville, 1st Earl of Dorset, and a daughter, Anne Sackville (d. 14 May 1595), who married Gregory Fiennes, 10th Baron Dacre (1539–1594).
- Christopher Sackville (c.1519–1558/9), who married, by 1541, Constance Culpeper, the daughter of Thomas Culpeper of Bedgebury, Kent, by whom he had at least two sons and a daughter.
- John Sackville (by 1523–1547x52).
- Isabel Sackville, who married Richard Ashburnham.
- Anne Sackville, who married Sir Nicholas Pelham. They had five sons and three daughters.
- Mary Sackville, who married John Lunsford.

After the death of Margaret Boleyn, Sackville married secondly, Anne Torrell (d. 13 April 1582), daughter of Humphrey Torrell of Torrells Hall, Willingale Doe, Essex, and Alice Leventhorpe, by whom he had no issue.
