= John Shurley =

Sir John Shurley (died 3 August 1527) was an English noble who held the financial office of Cofferer to the King during the reign of Henry VIII.

He was married twice. Firstly to Parnell (or Petronella) Grandford, daughter of John Graunford, King's bailiff of Rye and himself son of onetime Mayor of Rye Babylon Graundfote. Secondly to Margery Goring. He had at least five children, including Edward, his heir, John, William, Bridget and Joanne.

The surname seems to have come from Shurley Manor, which was located in Herefordshire, and the surname is commonly spelt Shirley today. He was the son of Roger Shurley of Presteign in Radnorshire, Wales. His mother was a daughter of William Walker, also of Presteign.

Eventually, the Shurley family became chief residents of Isfield in East Sussex, and Sir John and many of his family are buried at Isfield Church. The inscription over his tomb describes Sir John as "chef clerke of the kechen to our souayn kyng henry ye viii".

There is a description of him performing his duties as cofferer in "his own quaint way". This included leaving Court for the summer months to repair to Isfield: "a lamentable example to his staff" said his critics.

He had two prominent great-grandsons: Sir John Shurley, the politician and MP, and his brother Sir George Shurley, Lord Chief Justice of Ireland.
