= First Gladstone ministry =

Government of the United Kingdom

- 1868–1874
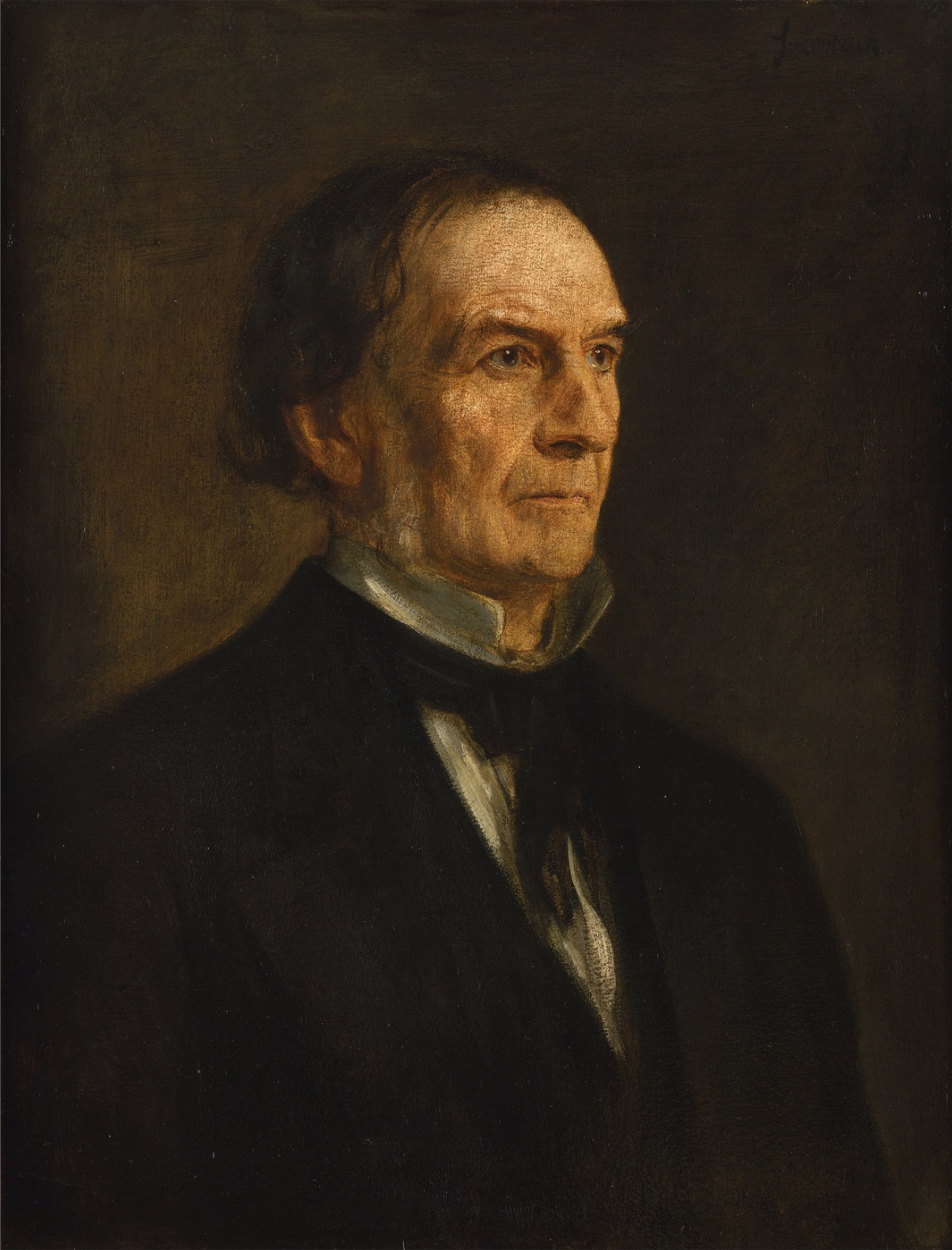
- Gladstone (1874)
- Date formed: 3 December 1868
- Date dissolved: 17 February 1874

People and organisations
- Monarch: Victoria
- Prime Minister: William Ewart Gladstone
- Total no. of members: 125 appointments
- Member party: Liberal Party
- Status in legislature: Majority
- Opposition party: Conservative Party
- Opposition leaders: Benjamin Disraeli in the House of Commons; Lord Malmesbury (1868–1869); Lord Cairns (1869–1870); Duke of Richmond (1870–1874) in the House of Lords

History
- Election: 1868 general election
- Outgoing election: 1874 general election
- Legislature terms: 20th UK Parliament lost a vote of confidence
- Predecessor: Third Derby–Disraeli ministry
- Successor: Second Disraeli ministry

The Conservative government under Benjamin Disraeli had been defeated at the 1868 general election, so in December 1868 the victorious William Ewart Gladstone formed his first government. He introduced reforms in the British Army (including the abolition of the purchase system), the legal system (establishing the Supreme Court of Judicature) and the Civil Service, and disestablished the Church of Ireland. In foreign affairs he pursued a peaceful policy. His ministry was defeated in the 1874 election, whereupon Disraeli formed a ministry and Gladstone retired as Leader of the Liberal Party.

== Cabinet ==
=== December 1868 – February 1874 ===
Office	Name	Term
First Lord of the Treasury; Leader of the House of Commons	William Ewart Gladstone	December 1868 – February 1874
Lord Chancellor	William Wood, 1st Baron Hatherley	December 1868 – October 1872
	Roundell Palmer, 1st Baron Selborne	October 1872 – February 1874
Lord President of the Council	George Robinson, 3rd Earl de Grey†	December 1868 – August 1873
	Henry Austin Bruce, 1st Baron Aberdare	August 1873 – February 1874
Lord Privy Seal	John Wodehouse, 1st Earl of Kimberley	December 1868 – July 1870
	Charles Wood, 1st Viscount Halifax	July 1870 – February 1874
Home Secretary	Henry Austin Bruce‡	December 1868 – August 1873
	Robert Lowe	August 1873 – February 1874
Foreign Secretary	George Villiers, 4th Earl of Clarendon	December 1868 – July 1870
	Granville Leveson-Gower, 2nd Earl Granville	July 1870 – February 1874
Secretary of State for the Colonies	Granville Leveson-Gower, 2nd Earl Granville	December 1868 – July 1870
	John Wodehouse, 1st Earl of Kimberley	July 1870 – February 1874
Secretary of State for War	Edward Cardwell	December 1868 – February 1874
Secretary of State for India	George Douglas Campbell, 8th Duke of Argyll	December 1868 – February 1874
Chancellor of the Exchequer	Robert Lowe	December 1868 – August 1873
	William Ewart Gladstone	August 1873 – February 1874
First Lord of the Admiralty	Hugh Childers	December 1868 – March 1871
	George Goschen	March 1871 – February 1874
President of the Board of Trade	John Bright	December 1868 – January 1871
	Chichester Fortescue	January 1871 – February 1874
President of the Poor Law Board	George Goschen	December 1868 – March 1871
	replaced by the Local Government Board	
President of the Local Government Board	James Stansfeld	March 1871 – February 1874
Chancellor of the Duchy of Lancaster	Hugh Childers	August 1872 – September 1873
	John Bright	September 1873 – February 1874
Postmaster General	Spencer Cavendish, Marquess of Hartington	December 1868 – January 1871
	incumbent not in cabinet	
Chief Secretary for Ireland	Chichester Fortescue	December 1868 – January 1871
	Spencer Cavendish, Marquess of Hartington	January 1871 – February 1874
Vice President of the Council	William Edward Forster	July 1870 – February 1874
Leader of the House of Lords	Granville Leveson-Gower, 2nd Earl Granville	December 1868 – February 1874

==== Notes ====
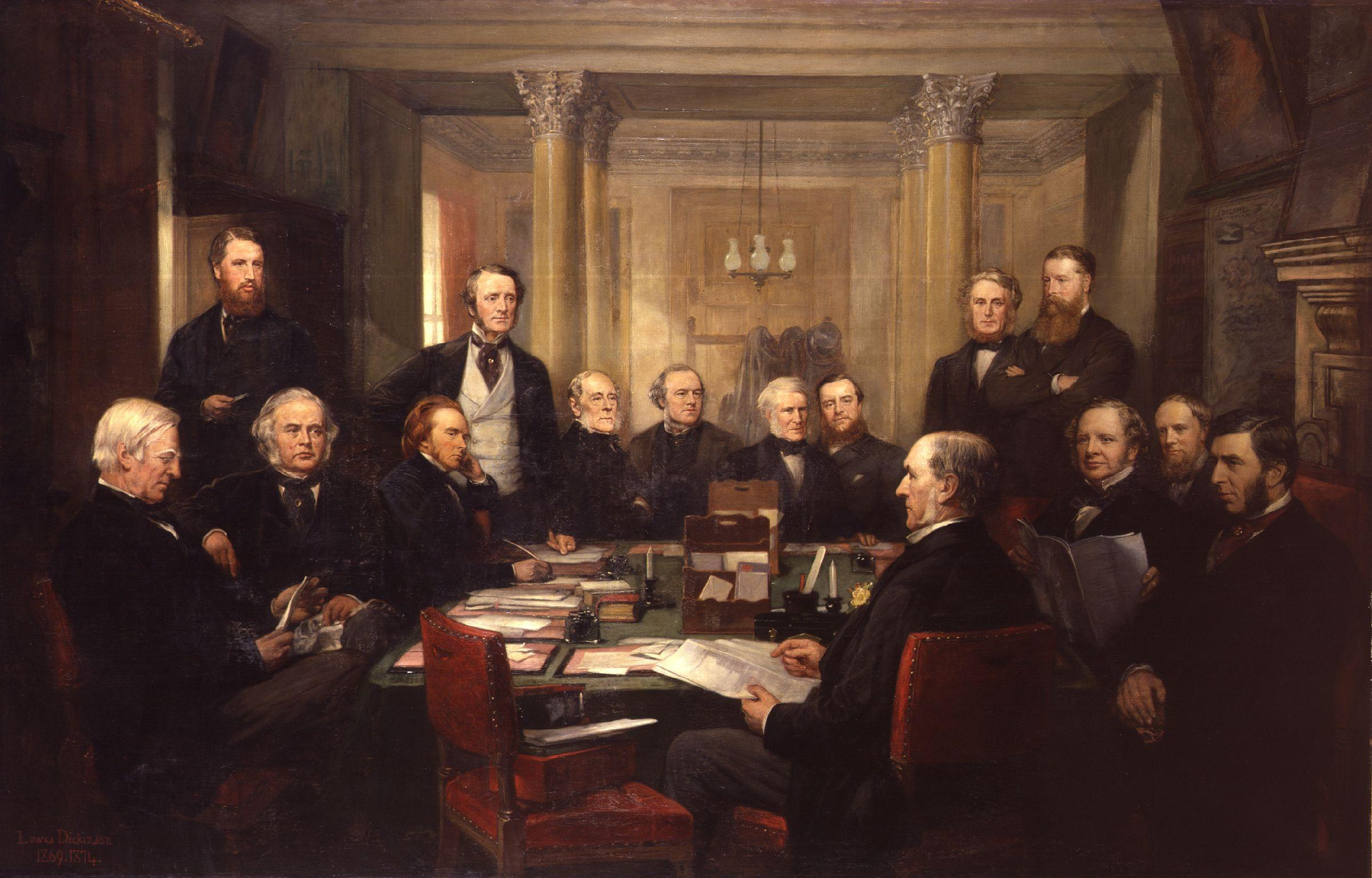
Gladstone's Cabinet of 1868, painted by Lowes Cato Dickinson. Use a cursor to see who is who.

† The Earl de Grey was created the Marquess of Ripon in 1871.
‡ Henry Austin Bruce was created Baron Aberdare in 1873.

- William Gladstone served as both First Lord of the Treasury and Chancellor of the Exchequer between August 1873 and February 1874.

==== Changes ====
- July 1870: On the death of Lord Clarendon, Lord Granville succeeds him as Foreign Secretary. Lord Kimberley succeeds Granville as Colonial Secretary, and Lord Halifax succeeds Kimberley as Lord Privy Seal. W.E. Forster enters the cabinet as vice president of the council.
- January 1871: Chichester Fortescue succeeds Bright at the Board of Trade. Lord Hartington succeeds Fortescue as Chief Secretary for Ireland. Hartington's successor as Postmaster-General is not in the Cabinet.
- March 1871: G.J. Goschen succeeds Childers at the Admiralty. James Stansfeld succeeds Goschen at the Poor Law Board (which becomes the Local Government Board later that year).
- August 1872: Hugh Childers returns to the Cabinet as Chancellor of the Duchy of Lancaster.
- October 1872: Lord Selborne succeeds Lord Hatherley as Lord Chancellor.
- August 1873: Lord Aberdare (formerly Henry Austin Bruce) succeeds Lord Ripon as Lord President. Robert Lowe succeeds Aberdare as Home Secretary. Gladstone himself takes over the Exchequer.
- September 1873: John Bright returns to the Cabinet, succeeding Childers at the Duchy of Lancaster.

== List of ministers ==
Cabinet members are listed in bold face.

Office	Name	Date
Prime Minister	**William Ewart Gladstone**	3 December 1868 – 17 February 1874 (Note: The Government resigned 13 March 1873 and resumed 19 March 1873.)
First Lord of the Treasury	**William Ewart Gladstone**	3 December 1868 – 17 February 1874
Leader of the House of Commons	**William Ewart Gladstone**	3 December 1868 – 17 February 1874
Chancellor of the Exchequer	**Robert Lowe**	9 December 1868
Chancellor of the Exchequer	**William Ewart Gladstone**	11 August 1873
Parliamentary Secretary to the Treasury	George Glyn	9 December 1868
Parliamentary Secretary to the Treasury	Arthur Peel	1 August 1873
Financial Secretary to the Treasury	Acton Smee Ayrton	9 December 1868
Financial Secretary to the Treasury	James Stansfeld	2 November 1869
Financial Secretary to the Treasury	William Edward Baxter	17 March 1871
Financial Secretary to the Treasury	John Dodson	11 August 1873
Junior Lords of the Treasury	James Stansfeld	16 December 1868 – 2 November 1869
Junior Lords of the Treasury	Henry Petty-FitzMaurice, 5th Marquess of Lansdowne	16 December 1868 – 25 April 1872
Junior Lords of the Treasury	William Patrick Adam	16 December 1868 – 8 August 1873
Junior Lords of the Treasury	John Cranch Walker Vivian	16 December 1868 – 4 August 1870
Junior Lords of the Treasury	William Henry Gladstone	2 November 1869 – 17 February 1874
Junior Lords of the Treasury	Lord Frederick Cavendish	8 August 1873 – 17 February 1874
Junior Lords of the Treasury	Algernon Greville	8 August 1873 – 17 February 1874
Lord Chancellor	**William Wood, 1st Baron Hatherley**	9 December 1868
Lord Chancellor	**Roundell Palmer, 1st Baron Selborne**	15 October 1872
Lord President of the Council	**George Robinson, 3rd Earl de Grey** (Note: Created Marquess of Ripon on 23 June 1871.)	9 December 1868
Lord President of the Council	**Henry Bruce** (Note: Created Baron Aberdare on 23 August 1873.)	9 August 1873
Lord Privy Seal	**John Wodehouse, 1st Earl of Kimberley**	9 December 1868
Lord Privy Seal	**Charles Wood, 1st Viscount Halifax**	6 July 1870
Secretary of State for the Home Department	**Henry Bruce**	9 December 1868
Secretary of State for the Home Department	**Robert Lowe**	9 August 1873
Under-Secretary of State for the Home Department	Edward Knatchbull-Hugessen	10 December 1868
Under-Secretary of State for the Home Department	George Shaw-Lefevre	11 January 1871
Under-Secretary of State for the Home Department	Henry Winterbotham	17 March 1871
Secretary of State for Foreign Affairs	**George Villiers, 4th Earl of Clarendon**	9 December 1868
Secretary of State for Foreign Affairs	**Granville Leveson-Gower, 2nd Earl Granville** (Note: Also Leader of the House of Lords.)	6 July 1870
Under-Secretary of State for Foreign Affairs	Arthur Otway	12 December 1868
Under-Secretary of State for Foreign Affairs	George Byng, Viscount Enfield	9 January 1871
Secretary of State for War	**Edward Cardwell**	9 December 1868
Under-Secretary of State for War	Thomas Barin, 2nd Baron Northbrook	10 December 1868
Under-Secretary of State for War	Henry Petty-FitzMaurice, 5th Marquess of Lansdowne	26 April 1872
Financial Secretary to the War Office	John Cranch Walker Vivian	5 August 1870
Financial Secretary to the War Office	Henry Campbell-Bannerman	15 November 1871
Surveyor-General of the Ordnance	Sir Henry Storks	5 August 1870
Secretary of State for the Colonies	**Granville Leveson-Gower, 2nd Earl Granville**	9 December 1868
Secretary of State for the Colonies	**John Wodehouse, 1st Earl of Kimberley**	6 July 1870
Under-Secretary of State for the Colonies	William Monsell	10 December 1868
Under-Secretary of State for the Colonies	Edward Knatchbull-Hugessen	14 January 1871
Secretary of State for India	**George Campbell, 8th Duke of Argyll**	9 December 1868
Under-Secretary of State for India	M. E. Grant Duff	10 December 1868
First Lord of the Admiralty	**Hugh Childers**	9 December 1868
First Lord of the Admiralty	**George Goschen**	24 March 1871
First (later Parliamentary) Secretary to the Admiralty	William Edward Baxter	18 December 1868
First (later Parliamentary) Secretary to the Admiralty	George Shaw-Lefevre	17 March 1871
Civil Lord of the Admiralty	George Trevelyan	21 December 1868
Civil Lord of the Admiralty	Robert Haldane-Duncan, 3rd Earl of Camperdown	11 July 1870
Vice-President of the Committee on Education	**William Edward Forster** (Note: Entered the Cabinet in July 1870.)	9 December 1868
Chief Secretary for Ireland	**Chichester Fortescue**	16 December 1868
Chief Secretary for Ireland	**Spencer Cavendish, Marquess of Hartington**	12 January 1871
Lord Lieutenant of Ireland	John Spencer, 5th Earl Spencer	18 December 1868
Chancellor of the Duchy of Lancaster	Frederick Hamilton-Temple-Blackwood, 5th Baron Dufferin and Clandeboye (Note: Created Earl of Dufferin on 13 November 1871.)	12 December 1868
Chancellor of the Duchy of Lancaster	**Hugh Childers**	9 August 1872
Chancellor of the Duchy of Lancaster	**John Bright**	30 September 1873
President of the Poor Law Board	**George Goschen**	9 December 1868
President of the Poor Law Board	**James Stansfeld** (Note: Board abolished on 14 August 1871.)	24 March 1871
Parliamentary Secretary to the Poor Law Board	Arthur Peel	10 December 1868
President of the Local Government Board	**James Stansfeld**	19 August 1871
Parliamentary Secretary to the Local Government Board	John Tomlinson Hibbert	19 August 1871
Postmaster-General	**Spencer Cavendish, Marquess of Hartington**	9 December 1868
Postmaster-General	William Monsell	14 January 1871
Postmaster-General	Lyon Playfair	18 November 1873
President of the Board of Trade	**John Bright**	9 December 1868
President of the Board of Trade	**Chichester Fortescue**	14 January 1871
Parliamentary Secretary to the Board of Trade	George Shaw-Lefevre	9 December 1868
Parliamentary Secretary to the Board of Trade	Arthur Peel	14 January 1871
Paymaster General	Frederick Hamilton-Temple-Blackwood, 5th Baron Dufferin and Clandeboye	12 December 1868
Paymaster General	Hugh Childers	9 August 1872
Paymaster General	William Patrick Adam	30 September 1873
First Commissioner of Works	Austen Henry Layard	9 December 1868
First Commissioner of Works	Acton Smee Ayrton	26 October 1869
First Commissioner of Works	William Patrick Adam	11 August 1873
Attorney General	Sir Robert Collier	12 December 1868
Attorney General	Sir John Coleridge	10 November 1871
Attorney General	Sir Henry James	20 November 1873
Solicitor General	Sir John Coleridge	12 December 1868
Solicitor General	Sir George Jessel	10 November 1871
Solicitor General	Sir Henry James	26 September 1873
Solicitor General	Sir William Vernon Harcourt	20 November 1873
Judge Advocate General	Sir Colman O'Loghlen	16 December 1868
Judge Advocate General	John Robert Davison	28 December 1870
Judge Advocate General	Sir Robert Phillimore	17 May 1871
Judge Advocate General	Acton Smee Ayrton	21 August 1873
Lord Advocate	James Moncreiff	10 December 1868
Lord Advocate	George Young	14 October 1869
Solicitor General for Scotland	George Young	14 December 1868
Solicitor General for Scotland	Andrew Rutherfurd-Clark	14 October 1869
Attorney General for Ireland	Edward Sullivan	12 December 1868
Attorney General for Ireland	Charles Robert Barry	26 January 1870
Attorney General for Ireland	Richard Dowse	13 January 1872
Attorney General for Ireland	Christopher Palles	5 November 1872
Solicitor General for Ireland	Charles Robert Barry	12 December 1868
Solicitor General for Ireland	Richard Dowse	14 February 1870
Solicitor General for Ireland	Christopher Palles	6 February 1872
Solicitor General for Ireland	Hugh Law	18 November 1872
Lord Steward of the Household	John Ponsonby, 5th Earl of Bessborough	12 December 1868
Lord Chamberlain of the Household	John Townshend, 1st Earl Sydney	9 December 1868
Vice-Chamberlain of the Household	Valentine Browne, Viscount Castlerosse (Note: Succeeded as 4th Earl of Kenmare on 26 December 1871.)	12 December 1868
Vice-Chamberlain of the Household	Lord Richard Grosvenor	25 February 1872
Master of the Horse	George Brudenell-Bruce, 2nd Marquess of Ailesbury	12 December 1868
Treasurer of the Household	George Fleming Warren, 2nd Baron De Tabley	12 December 1868
Treasurer of the Household	Augustus Bampfylde, 2nd Baron Poltimore	1 March 1872
Treasurer of the Household	William Monson, 7th Baron Monson	1 January 1874
Comptroller of the Household	Lord Otho FitzGerald	12 December 1868
Captain of the Gentlemen-at-Arms	Thomas Foley, 4th Baron Foley	12 December 1868
Captain of the Gentlemen-at-Arms	George Phipps, 2nd Marquess of Normanby	27 December 1869
Captain of the Gentlemen-at-Arms	Francis Cowper, 7th Earl Cowper	20 April 1871
Captain of the Gentlemen-at-Arms	Henry Fox-Strangways, 5th Earl of Ilchester	1 January 1874
Captain of the Yeomen of the Guard	William Beauclerk, 10th Duke of St Albans	22 December 1868
Master of the Buckhounds	Richard Boyle, 9th Earl of Cork	12 December 1868
Mistress of the Robes	Elizabeth Campbell, Duchess of Argyll	17 December 1868
Mistress of the Robes	Anne Sutherland-Leveson-Gower, Duchess of Sutherland	22 January 1870
Lords in Waiting	George Phipps, 2nd Marquess of Normanby	17 December 1868 – 27 December 1869
Lords in Waiting	Robert Haldane-Duncan, 3rd Earl of Camperdown	17 December 1868 – 11 July 1870
Lords in Waiting	Francis Stonor, 4th Baron Camoys	17 December 1868 – 17 February 1874
Lords in Waiting	Charles Harbord, 5th Baron Suffield	17 December 1868 – 25 February 1872
Lords in Waiting	Frederick Methuen, 2nd Baron Methuen	17 December 1868 – 17 February 1874
Lords in Waiting	Albert Parker, 3rd Earl of Morley	22 December 1868 – 17 February 1874
Lords in Waiting	Charles Brownlow, 2nd Baron Lurgan	27 January 1869 – 17 February 1874
Lords in Waiting	Arthur Wrottesley, 3rd Baron Wrottesley	27 December 1869 – 17 February 1874
Lords in Waiting	Charles Gordon, 11th Marquess of Huntly	21 July 1870 – 1 March 1873
Lords in Waiting	Valentine Browne, 4th Earl of Kenmare	25 February 1872 – 17 February 1874
Lords in Waiting	Gavin Campbell, 7th Earl of Breadalbane	1 March 1873 – 17 February 1874

Notes

Preceded by Third Derby–Disraeli ministry	Government of the United Kingdom; 1868–1874	Succeeded by Second Disraeli ministry
