= Gladstone's Cabinet of 1868 =

Painting by Lowes Cato Dickinson

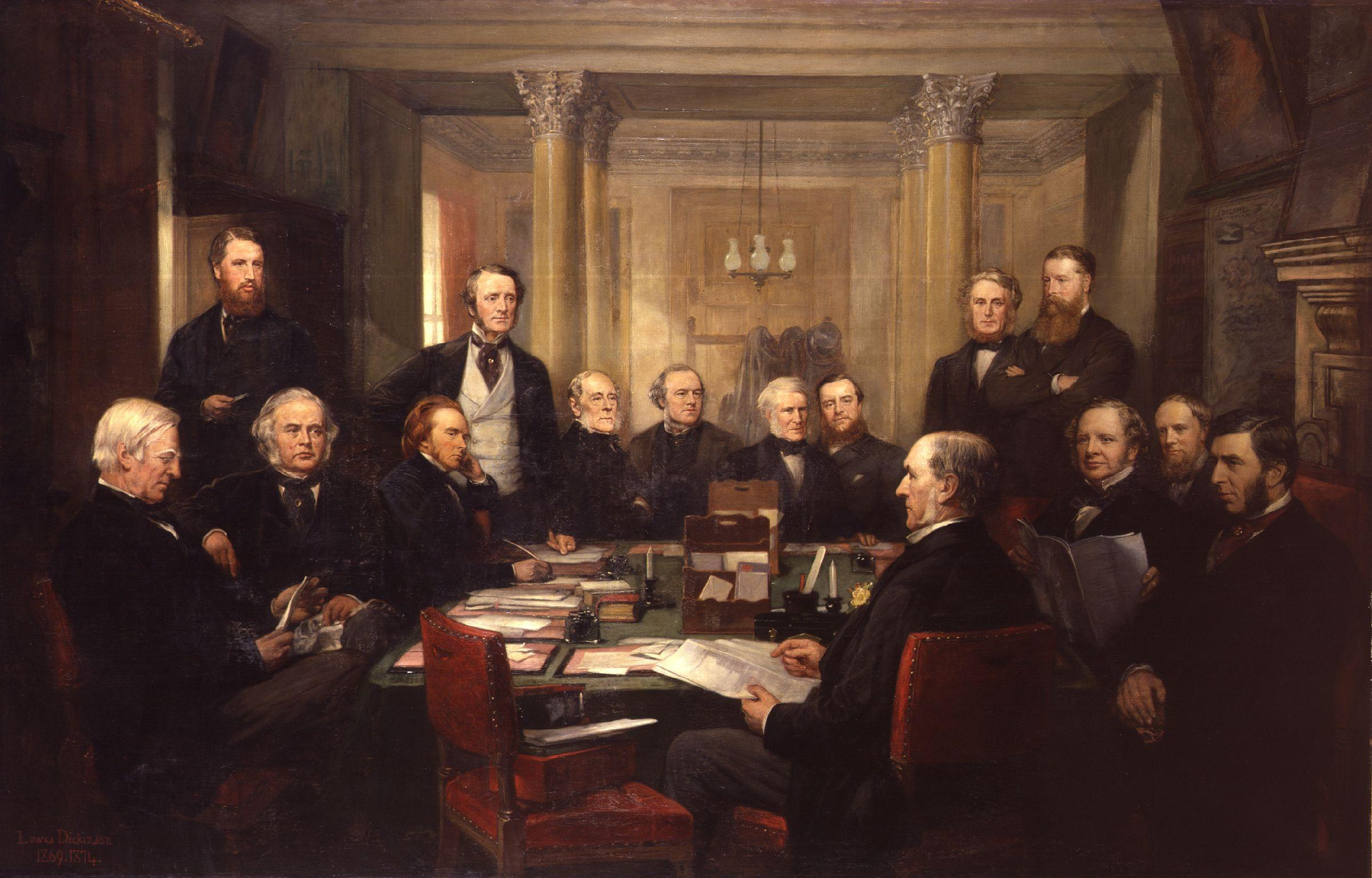
- Artist: Lowes Cato Dickinson
- Year: 1869–74
- Type: Oil on canvas, portrait painting
- Dimensions: 204.5 cm × 317.5 cm (80.5 in × 125.0 in)
- Location: National Portrait Gallery; London

Gladstone's Cabinet of 1868 is a group portrait painting by the British artist Lowes Cato Dickinson. It shows the leading members of the First Gladstone ministry seated in the Cabinet Room of 10 Downing Street. Led by William Ewart Gladstone they had defeated the Conservatives of Benjamin Disraeli at the 1868 general election.

Today the painting is part of the collection of the National Portrait Gallery in London having been purchased in 1977.

== Bibliography ==
- Leonard, Dick. The Great Rivalry: Gladstone and Disraeli. Bloomsbury Publishing, 2013.
- Saywell, David & Simon, Jacob. National Portrait Gallery: Complete Illustrated Catalogue. National Portrait Gallery, 2004.
- Shannon, Richard. Gladstone: Volume 2. University of North Carolina Press, 1984.
