= Disraeli ministry =

Disraeli ministry may refer to:

- First Derby–Disraeli ministry, the British government under Lord Derby and Benjamin Disraeli (February–December 1852)
- Second Derby–Disraeli ministry, the British government under Lord Derby and Benjamin Disraeli (1858–1859)
- Third Derby–Disraeli ministry, the British government under Lord Derby and Benjamin Disraeli (1866–1868)
- First Disraeli ministry, the British minority government led by Benjamin Disraeli (February–December 1868)
- Second Disraeli ministry, the British majority government led by Benjamin Disraeli, 1st Earl of Beaconsfield (1874–1880)

== See also ==
- Premierships of Benjamin Disraeli
