= John Shurley (died 1631) =

English politician (1568–1631)

Sir John Shurley (20 April 1568 – 25 April 1631) was an English politician who sat in the House of Commons in 1625.

Shurley was the son of Thomas Shurley of Isfield, Sussex, by his first wife Anne Pelham, daughter of Sir Nicholas Pelham of Laughton, East Sussex and Anne Sackville; and great-grandson of John Shurley (died 1527) who held the office of Cofferer to King Henry VIII. Sir George Shurley, Lord Chief Justice of Ireland, was his younger brother. Through his mother, he had a useful family connection to Elizabeth I: his grandmother was a first cousin of Anne Boleyn. He matriculated on entry to Hart Hall, Oxford on 22 June 1582, aged 14. He was a student of the Middle Temple in 1591. He succeeded his father in 1579 and was knighted on 11 May 1603.

In 1593 he was elected MP for East Grinstead, in 1597 for Steyning and in 1604 for Bramber. He was appointed High Sheriff of Surrey and Sussex for 1616–17. In 1625, he was elected member of parliament for Sussex.

Shurley died at Lewes at the age of about 62. He had married firstly his cousin Jane Shurley, daughter of Sir Thomas Shurley, and secondly Dorothy Goring, daughter of George Goring of Danny House, Sussex and Mary Everard, and widow of the wealthy ironmaster Sir Henry Bowyer. Her husband praised Dorothy as being "the kindest of stepmothers" to his children by Jane. He was survived by five daughters from his first marriage but had no surviving son, and Isfield passed to his brother George's son Robert, and later by marriage into the Radcliffe family. Sir John's best-known daughter was Jane (died 1666), who married as her third husband the leading statesman Denzil Holles, 1st Baron Holles.

Parliament of England
Preceded by Algernon Lord Peircy; Thomas Pelham	Member of Parliament for Sussex; 1625; With: Thomas Pelham	Succeeded by Sir Walter Covert; Sir Alexander Temple
