= Richard Benson Warren =

Irish barrister (1784–1848)

Richard Benson Warren (1784 – 1848) was an Irish barrister and Law Officer who held the position of Serjeant-at-law.

== Biography ==
He was born in 1784, at Warrens Court, near Macroom, County Cork, the seventh son of Sir Robert Warren, 1st Baronet, and the eldest by his father's second marriage to Elizabeth Lawton. The Warrens had been prominent landowners in Cork since about 1700, and had acquired the lands of the Crooke family (who founded the town of Baltimore, County Cork) by his grandfather's marriage to Anne Crooke. Warrens Court was burnt to the ground in 1921 during the Irish War of Independence.

He entered Trinity College Dublin in 1800. He was called to the Irish Bar in 1806, and became King's Counsel in 1824. He became a Bencher of the King's Inns in 1839. He was appointed Third Serjeant in 1841, and Second Serjeant in 1842, holding the latter office until his death in 1848.

He married Elizabeth Pendleton, daughter of Philip Pendelton of Mooretown, County Meath, and had seven children. Of their sons Robert, like his father, was a barrister, while Augustus was a distinguished soldier who rose to the rank of Major General. Their daughter Martha married James Stewart, a land agent, and was the mother of Robert Warren Stewart, a well-known missionary who was murdered in China, and of George Francis Stewart, Governor of the Bank of Ireland.

Warren died in 1848, aged 63 or 64. Robert Warren, judge of the Irish Probate Court 1868–1897, was his nephew, the son of his brother Captain Henry Warren.
