= Sir Augustus Warren, 2nd Baronet =

Anglo-Irish politician (1754–1821)

Sir Augustus Louis Carré Warren, 2nd Baronet (1754 – 30 January 1821) was an Anglo-Irish politician.

Warren was the son of Sir Robert Warren, 1st Baronet and Mary Carré. He married Mary Bernard, daughter of James Bernard and Esther Smith, in 1778.

He was the Member of Parliament for Cork City in the Irish House of Commons between 1783 and 1790. In 1811 Warren succeeded to his father's baronetcy. He was succeeded by his eldest son, also called Augustus.

Parliament of Ireland
| Preceded by John Hely-Hutchinson; William Ponsonby | Member of Parliament for Cork City; 1783–1790; With: John Hely-Hutchinson | Succeeded by John Hely-Hutchinson; Richard Longfield |
Baronetage of Ireland
| Preceded by Robert Warren | Baronet (of Warren's Court); 1811–1821 | Succeeded by Augustus Warren |
