= John Ross of the Inner Temple =

John Ross (Latin: Johannes Rossus) (1563–1607) was an English barrister and poet.

== Life ==
Ross was born at Waddesdon, Buckinghamshire, and educated at Westminster School. He entered the Inner Temple in 1584, having attended Trinity College, Cambridge as a sizar without taking a degree, and then moving to Lyon's Inn.

== Works ==
- Britannica, sive de regibus veteris Britanniae usque ad exitium gentis, & Saxonum imperium, historia versibus expressa (1607)
- Ad Praesens Tempus Apostrophe on the Gunpowder Plot
- Tractatus Apologeticus defending the historian Geoffrey of Monmouth
- Memorial poem for Sir William Sackville, knighted by Henry IV of France and killed fighting for him.
