= Edmund Pelham =

Member of the Parliament of England

Sir Edmund (or Edward) Pelham (c.1533 – 1606) was a member of the Pelham family of Laughton, East Sussex. He was a judge in Ireland who held the office of Chief Baron of the Irish Exchequer, and was the first judge to hold assizes in Ulster.

His career suffered due to suspicions that he was secretly a Roman Catholic. These suspicions were due partly to his marriage into a recusant family, and partly due to the open indifference which both he and his wife showed to the Anglican faith.

== Background ==
Pelham was the fifth son of Sir William Pelham of Laughton in East Sussex and his second wife Mary Sandys, daughter of William Sandys, 1st Baron Sandys of the Vyne and Margaret Bray. Sir William Pelham, Lord Justice of Ireland (died 1587) was his full brother, and Sir Nicholas Pelham (1517-60) was his older half-brother.

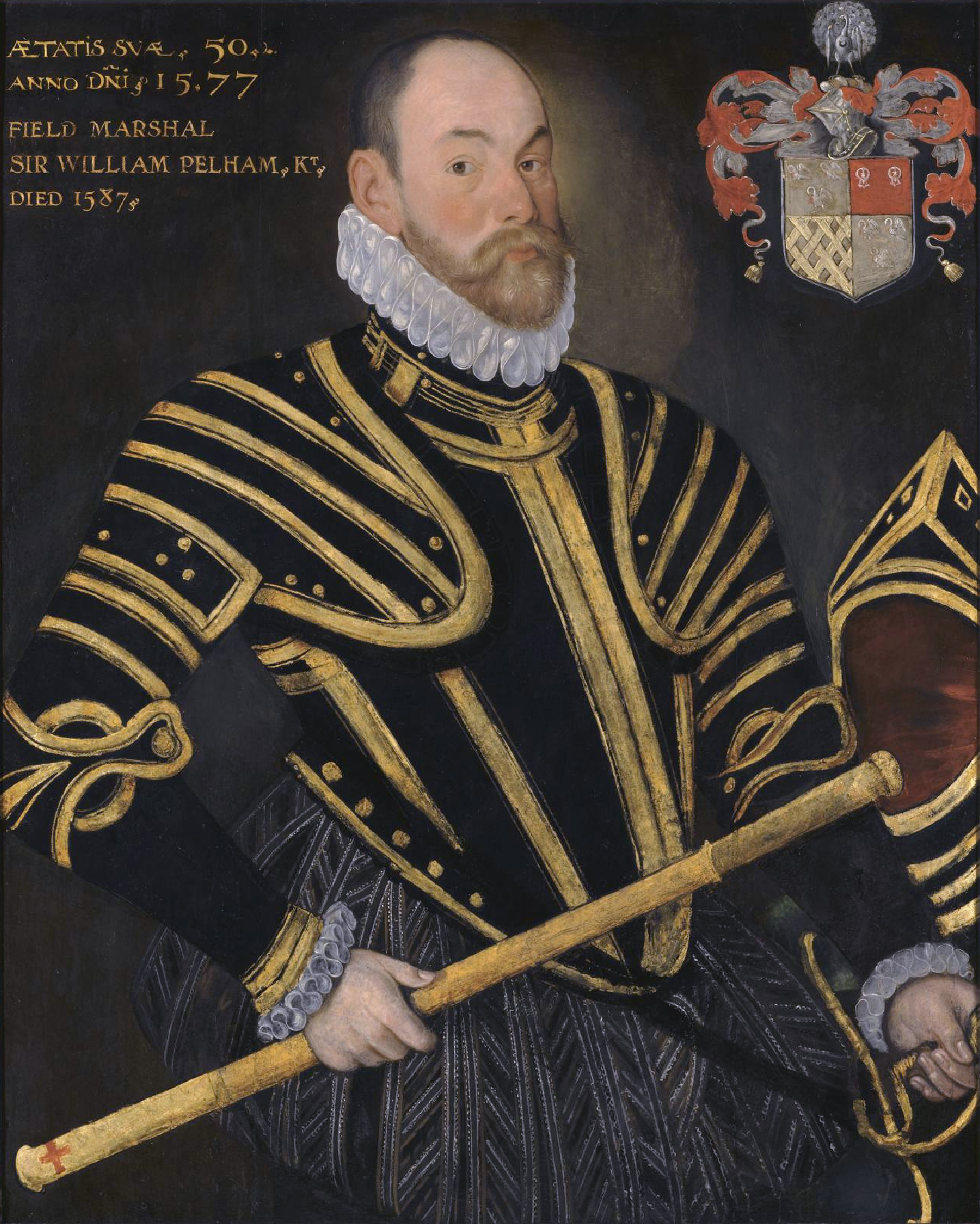
Sir William Pelham, Lord Justice of Ireland, Edmund's elder brother

== Early career ==
Pelham's father died when he was about five years old. Little is recorded of his life until 1563 when he was admitted to Gray's Inn; he was called to the bar in 1574. He remained at Gray's Inn for 40 years, becoming Reader and Ancient of the Inn, but he does not seem to have advanced far in his legal career, although he was elected to the House of Commons as member for Hastings in 1597. The fact that his wife Ellen Darrell belonged to an openly Roman Catholic family no doubt hindered his career. His enemies accused him, if not of actual Catholic sympathies, at least of being a "cold professor" of the Protestant faith. He rarely and only with reluctance attended Church of England services, and even more rarely took Holy Communion, at a time when failure to attend Church once a week and take Communion at least once a year was a breach of the law, and evidence of recusancy.

== In Ireland ==
In 1601 he finally became Serjeant-at-law: since he was now close to 70, this might reasonably have been expected to mark the high point of his career. However, in 1602 Sir Robert Napier, who had long been recognised as unfit for high office, was at last removed as the Irish Chief Baron, and Pelham, perhaps because of his brother's long experience as Lord Justice in Ireland, was chosen to replace him. His enemies noted with glee that the Spanish invasion of Ireland and the ensuing Battle of Kinsale filled him with trepidation, and he was accused of deliberately delaying his departure to Ireland until peace was restored. It appears that he only accepted the office in the mistaken belief that it was for one year only. On his arrival, he became involved in a row with Napier as to who was entitled to the last quarter's salary.

As Chief Baron, he is best remembered for holding the first assizes in Donegal in 1603. Allowing for an element of self-congratulation in his own description of the assizes, he seems to have been highly successful in this task: he wrote that "the people reverenced him as though he had been an angel from Heaven, and prayed him on their knees to return to minister justice unto them".

He was knighted by King James I of England at Greenwich in 1604. He sat on a commission to inquire into damage suffered by landowners during the Nine Years War, went on the Leinster assize in 1605, and acted as Commissioner of the Great Seal the same year. However, he was now an old and sick man: he went to Bath to recover his health in 1606, but died at Chester on 4 June. Sir Arthur Chichester, the Lord Deputy of Ireland, praised him as a diligent and very worthy judge, but regretted that his illness had impaired the efficient running of the Exchequer.

== Family ==
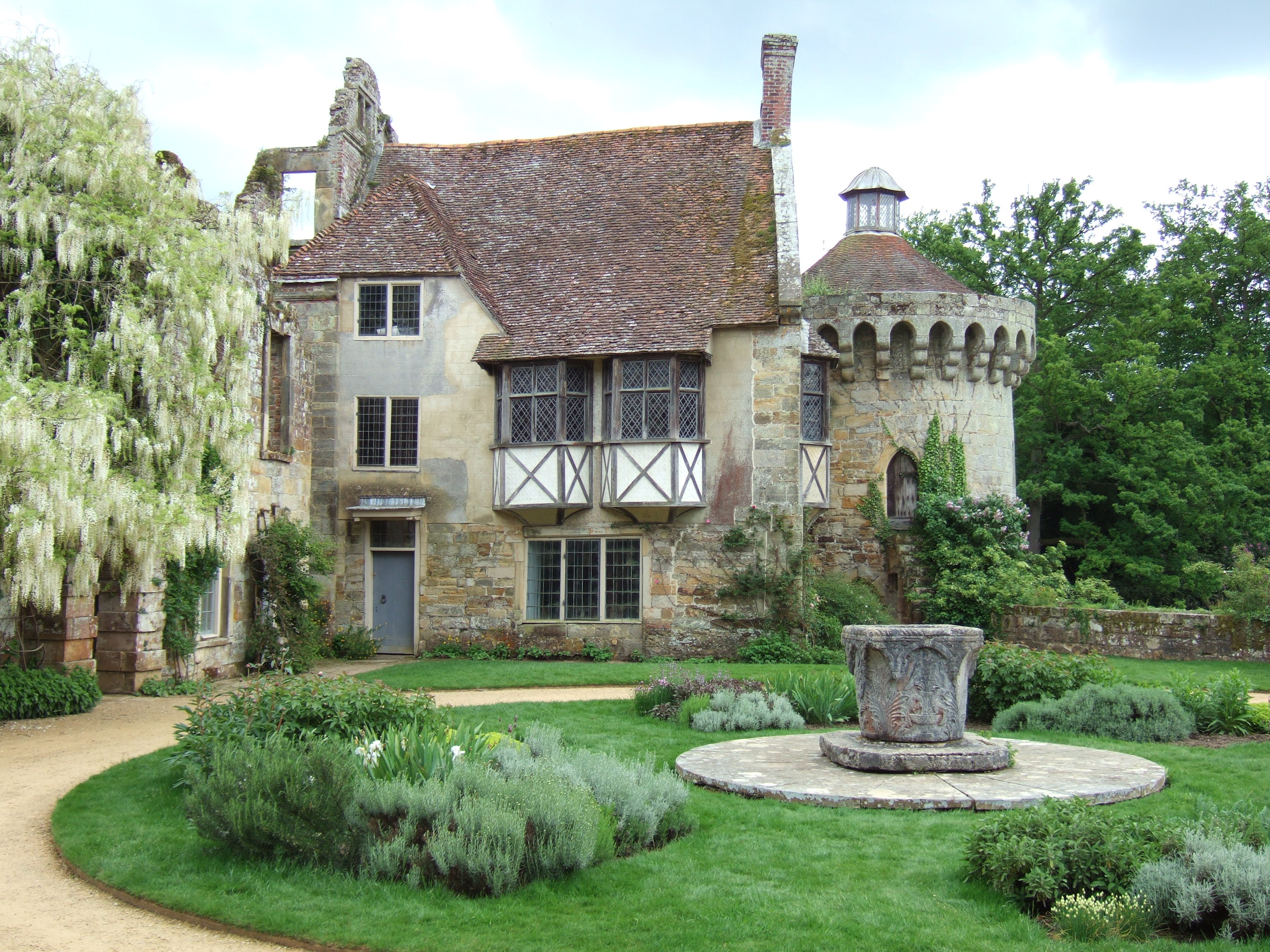
Scotney Castle, the home of Pelham's wife Ellen Darrell

His marriage to Ellen (or Helen) Darrell, daughter of Thomas Darrell of Scotney Castle, Sussex, and his second wife Mary Roydon, was a surprising one for an ambitious lawyer, since the Darrells were notorious recusants who allowed the Jesuits to use Scotney as a refuge. He had five sons including his eldest son and heir Herbert (born 1587), ancestor of the Pelhams of Catsfield, and three daughters, including Ellen (who was still alive in 1609). His widow continued to suffer legal troubles after his death, on account of her Catholic faith. Edmund was on good terms with his wife's brothers George and Christopher, and became a partner in their iron foundry.

Little appears to be known of Edmunds' children, except for his eldest son, Herbert, and his daughter Ellen, who was charged with recusancy in 1609, along with her mother. Her brother Herbert, by contrast, was reputed to be a strong Puritan, who was opposed, like most Puritans, to the wearing by the local vicar of the surplice. He compared the practice colourfully to a pig wearing a saddle, for which remark he was reported to the authorities by the local churchwarden in 1611.
