= G. F. Stewart =

Irish land agent and public servant (1851–1928)

The Right Honourable G. F. Stewart JP DL
- Born: George Francis Stewart; 1 November 1851; Gortleitragh House, County Dublin, Ireland
- Died: 12 August 1928 (aged 76)
- Occupation(s): Land agent, public servant
- Relatives: Robert Stewart (brother); Richard Benson Warren (grandfather); Sir Robert Warren, 1st Baronet (great-grandfather)

George Francis Stewart PC (Ire) JP DL (1 November 1851 – 12 August 1928) was an Irish land agent and public servant.

== Biography ==
Stewart was born on 1 November 1851, at Gortleitragh House, County Dublin, to James Robert Stewart, a wealthy land agent, and Martha his wife Martha, daughter of the eminent barrister Richard Benson Warren, and granddaughter of Sir Robert Warren, 1st Baronet, the head of a leading landowning family from County Cork. The prominent missionary Robert Warren Stewart, who was murdered in China in 1895, was his elder brother.

Stewart was educated at Marlborough College and Trinity College, Dublin, graduating in 1872. He set up in business as a land agent in County Leitrim and acquired extensive interests. He was chairman of the Irish branch of the Surveyors' Institute and later of the institute itself and of the Land Agents' Association. In 1919, he was appointed Governor of the Bank of Ireland. He was a Unionist member of the Irish Convention, and served as the Vice-Chairman of the Irish Unionist Alliance. Stewart was appointed to the Privy Council for Ireland in the 1921 Birthday Honours, entitling him to the style "The Right Honourable".

Stewart married Georgiana Lavinia Quin, daughter of Richard Quin of Torquay, in 1881; they had four children. He died on 12 August 1928, aged 76.
