= Derby ministry =

Derby ministry may refer to:

- First Derby ministry, the British government led by Lord Derby from February to December 1852
- Second Derby ministry, the British government led by Lord Derby from 1858 to 1859
- Third Derby ministry, the British government led by Lord Derby from 1866 to 1868
