= Third Derby–Disraeli ministry =

Government of the United Kingdom

- 1866–1868; 1868
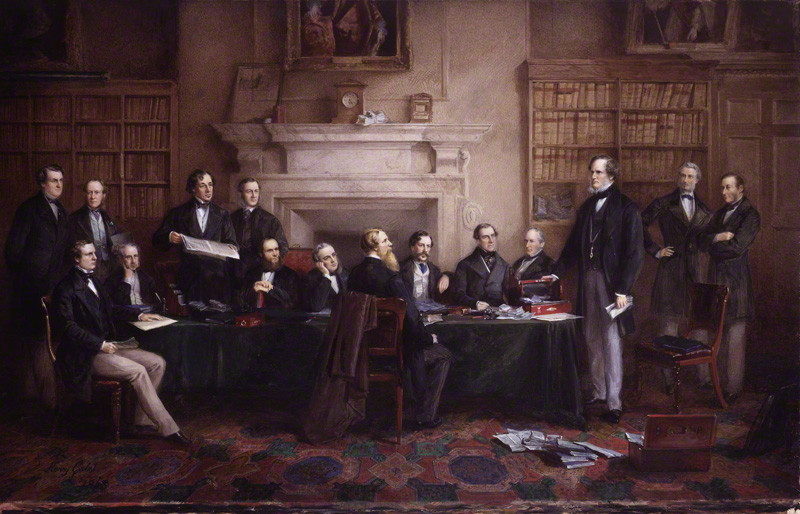
- The Derby Cabinet of 1867 as painted by Henry Gales.
- Date formed: 28 June 1866
- Date dissolved: 1 December 1868

People and organisations
- Monarch: Victoria
- Prime Minister: Edward Smith-Stanley, 14th Earl of Derby (1866–1868); Benjamin Disraeli (1868)
- Chancellor of the Exchequer: Benjamin Disraeli (1866–1868)
- Total no. of members: 105 appointments
- Member party: Conservative Party
- Status in legislature: Minority dependent on Adullamite support
- Opposition party: Liberal Party
- Opposition leaders: William Ewart Gladstone in the House of Commons; Lord Russell (1866–1868); Lord Granville (1868) in the House of Lords

History
- Outgoing election: 1868 general election
- Legislature terms: 19th UK Parliament
- Predecessor: Second Russell ministry
- Successor: First Gladstone ministry

The Conservative government of the United Kingdom of Great Britain and Ireland that began in 1866 and ended in 1868 was led by Edward Smith-Stanley, 14th Earl of Derby in the House of Lords and Benjamin Disraeli in the House of Commons.

== History ==
Lord Derby became prime minister for the third time, after the fall of John Russell, 1st Earl Russell's Liberal government, in 1866. His Chancellor of the Exchequer, Benjamin Disraeli, was instrumental in passing the Second Reform Act in 1867.

After the parliamentary session, which produced the Second Reform Bill, Disraeli's eventual assumption of the leadership of the Conservative Party was all but assured. While he was still opposed by elements of the party's right wing (most notably Robert Gascoyne-Cecil, 3rd Marquess of Salisbury, himself a future prime minister), his role in securing the passage of the bill, in particular his showing against William Ewart Gladstone, had won him the adulation of a wide base of the parliamentary party. The only unknown was the health of the Earl of Derby, still very much prime minister, Conservative leader, and Disraeli's colleague.

Derby's health, however, had been in decline for some time, and he finally resigned in February and advised Queen Victoria to send for Disraeli. Thus on 27 February 1868 Benjamin Disraeli became Prime Minister of the United Kingdom. He reportedly said of the event later, "I have climbed to the top of the greasy pole." However, the Conservatives were still a minority in the House of Commons, and the enaction of the Reform Bill required the calling of new election. Disraeli's term as prime minister would therefore be fairly short, unless the Conservatives managed to win the general election.

Although all the cabinet posts were at his disposal, Disraeli made only a few changes: he replaced Lord Chelmsford as Lord Chancellor with Lord Cairns, and brought in George Ward Hunt as Chancellor of the Exchequer. Disraeli and Chelmsford had never got on, and in Disraeli's view, Cairns was a far stronger minister. He also chose the Earl of Malmesbury to succeed Derby as Leader in the House of Lords.

=== The Irish Church ===
The principal issue of the 1868 parliamentary session was the Irish question, manifested this time in the debate over the Anglican Church of Ireland.

=== Fate ===
The Conservatives were defeated by the Liberals in the general election of 1868, and the new Liberal leader William Ewart Gladstone formed his first government.

== Cabinets ==
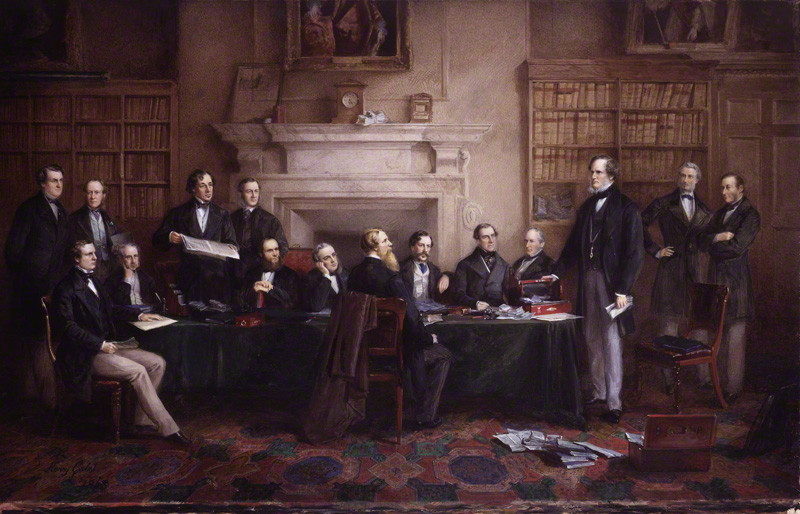
The Derby Cabinet of 1867 as painted by Henry Gales.

=== June 1866 – February 1868 ===
Office	Name	Term
First Lord of the Treasury; Leader of the House of Lords	Edward Smith-Stanley, 14th Earl of Derby	June 1866 – February 1868
Lord Chancellor	Frederic Thesiger, 1st Baron Chelmsford	June 1866 – February 1868
Lord President of the Council	Richard Temple-Nugent-Brydges-Chandos-Grenville, 3rd Duke of Buckingham and Chandos	June 1866 – March 1867
Lord President of the Council	John Spencer-Churchill, 7th Duke of Marlborough	March 1867 – February 1868
Lord Privy Seal	James Howard Harris, 3rd Earl of Malmesbury	June 1866 – February 1868
Home Secretary	Spencer Horatio Walpole	June 1866 – May 1867
Home Secretary	Gathorne Hardy	May 1867 – February 1868
Foreign Secretary	Edward Stanley, Lord Stanley	June 1866 – February 1868
Secretary of State for the Colonies	Henry Herbert, 4th Earl of Carnarvon	June 1866 – March 1867
Secretary of State for the Colonies	Richard Temple-Nugent-Brydges-Chandos-Grenville, 3rd Duke of Buckingham and Chandos	March 1867 – February 1868
Secretary of State for War	Jonathan Peel	June 1866 – March 1867
Secretary of State for War	Sir John Pakington, 1st Baronet	March 1867 – February 1868
First Lord of the Admiralty	Sir John Pakington, 1st Baronet	June 1866 – March 1867
First Lord of the Admiralty	Henry Thomas Lowry-Corry	March 1867 – February 1868
Secretary of State for India	Robert Gascoyne-Cecil, Viscount Cranborne	June 1866 – March 1867
Secretary of State for India	Sir Stafford Northcote, 8th Baronet	March 1867 – February 1868
Chancellor of the Exchequer; Leader of the House of Commons	Benjamin Disraeli	June 1866 – February 1868
President of the Board of Trade	Sir Stafford Northcote, 8th Baronet	June 1866 – March 1867
President of the Board of Trade	Charles Gordon-Lennox, 6th Duke of Richmond	March 1867 – February 1868
President of the Poor Law Board	Gathorne Hardy	June 1866 – May 1867
President of the Poor Law Board	incumbent not in the cabinet	
First Commissioner of Works	Lord John Manners	June 1866 – February 1868
Chief Secretary for Ireland	Richard Bourke, Baron Naas	June 1866 – February 1868
Minister without Portfolio	Spencer Horatio Walpole	May 1867 – February 1868

==== Notes ====
- This Cabinet of Derby's is the first for which a complete collection of photographs exists of its members.

==== Changes ====
- March 1867: Lord Carnarvon, Lord Cranborne, and General Peel resign from the cabinet over the Reform Bill. They are succeeded by the Duke of Buckingham, Sir Stafford Northcote, and Sir John Pakington, respectively. Taking their places were three new members of the cabinet: the Duke of Marlborough, the Duke of Richmond, and Henry Lowry-Corry.
- May 1867: Gathorne Hardy replaces Spencer Walpole as Home Secretary. Walpole remains in the cabinet as Minister without Portfolio. Hardy's replacement as President of the Poor Law Board is not in the cabinet.

=== February 1868 – December 1868 ===
Office	Name	Term
First Lord of the Treasury; Leader of the House of Commons	Benjamin Disraeli	February–December 1868
Lord Chancellor	Hugh Cairns, 1st Baron Cairns	February–December 1868
Lord President of the Council	John Spencer-Churchill, 7th Duke of Marlborough	February–December 1868
Lord Privy Seal; Leader of the House of Lords	James Howard Harris, 3rd Earl of Malmesbury	February–December 1868
Home Secretary	Gathorne Hardy	February–December 1868
Foreign Secretary	Edward Stanley, Lord Stanley	February–December 1868
Secretary of State for the Colonies	Richard Temple-Nugent-Brydges-Chandos-Grenville, 3rd Duke of Buckingham and Chandos	February–December 1868
Secretary of State for War	Sir John Pakington, 1st Baronet	February–December 1868
Secretary of State for India	Sir Stafford Northcote, 8th Baronet	February–December 1868
Chancellor of the Exchequer	George Ward Hunt	February–December 1868
First Lord of the Admiralty	Henry Thomas Lowry-Corry	February–December 1868
President of the Board of Trade	Charles Gordon-Lennox, 6th Duke of Richmond	February–December 1868
First Commissioner of Works	Lord John Manners	February–December 1868
Chief Secretary for Ireland	Richard Bourke, 6th Earl of Mayo	February–September 1868
	successor not in the cabinet	

==== Changes ====
- September 1868: The Earl of Mayo leaves the cabinet to become Viceroy of India. His successor is not in the cabinet.

== List of ministers ==
Cabinet members are listed in bold face.

Office	Name	Date
Prime Minister First Lord of the Treasury	**Edward Smith-Stanley, 14th Earl of Derby** (Note: Also Leader of the House of Lords.)	28 June 1866 – 25 February 1868
Prime Minister First Lord of the Treasury	**Benjamin Disraeli** (Note: Also Leader of the House of Commons.)	27 February 1868 – 1 December 1868
Chancellor of the Exchequer	**Benjamin Disraeli** (Note: Also Leader of the House of Commons.)	6 July 1866
Chancellor of the Exchequer	**George Ward Hunt**	29 February 1868
Parliamentary Secretary to the Treasury	Thomas Edward Taylor	14 July 1866
Parliamentary Secretary to the Treasury	Gerard Noel	11 November 1868
Financial Secretary to the Treasury	George Ward Hunt	14 July 1866
Financial Secretary to the Treasury	George Sclater-Booth	4 March 1868
Junior Lords of the Treasury	Gerard Noel	12 July 1866 – 2 November 1868
Junior Lords of the Treasury	Sir Graham Graham-Montgomery	12 July 1866 – 1 December 1868
Junior Lords of the Treasury	Henry Whitmore	12 July 1866 – 1 December 1868
Junior Lords of the Treasury	Lord Claud Hamilton	2 November 1868 – 1 December 1868
Lord Chancellor	**Frederic Thesiger, 1st Baron Chelmsford**	6 July 1866
Lord Chancellor	**Hugh Cairns, 1st Baron Cairns**	29 February 1868
Lord President of the Council	**Richard Temple-Nugent-Brydges-Chandos-Grenville, 3rd Duke of Buckingham and Chandos**	6 July 1866
Lord President of the Council	**John Spencer-Churchill, 7th Duke of Marlborough**	8 March 1867
Lord Privy Seal	**James Harris, 3rd Earl of Malmesbury** (Note: Also Leader of the House of Lords 27 February 1868 – 1 December 1868.)	6 July 1866
Secretary of State for the Home Department	**Spencer Horatio Walpole**	6 July 1866
Secretary of State for the Home Department	**Gathorne Hardy**	17 May 1867
Under-Secretary of State for the Home Department	Somerset Lowry-Corry, 4th Earl Belmore	10 July 1866
Under-Secretary of State for the Home Department	Sir James Fergusson, 6th Baronet	1 August 1867
Under-Secretary of State for the Home Department	Sir Michael Hicks Beach, 9th Baronet	10 August 1868
Secretary of State for Foreign Affairs	**Edward Stanley, Lord Stanley**	6 July 1866
Under-Secretary of State for Foreign Affairs	Edward Egerton	6 July 1866
Secretary of State for War	**Jonathan Peel**	6 July 1866
Secretary of State for War	**Sir John Pakington 1st Baronet**	8 March 1867
Under-Secretary of State for War	William Pakenham, 4th Earl of Longford	7 July 1866
Surveyor-General of the Ordnance	vacant	—
Secretary of State for the Colonies	**Henry Herbert, 4th Earl of Carnarvon**	6 July 1866
Secretary of State for the Colonies	**Richard Temple-Nugent-Brydges-Chandos-Grenville, 3rd Duke of Buckingham and Chandos**	8 March 1867
Under-Secretary of State for the Colonies	Charles Adderley	6 July 1866
Secretary of State for India	**Robert Gascoyne-Cecil, Viscount Cranborne**	6 July 1866
Secretary of State for India	**Sir Stafford Northcote, 8th Baronet**	8 March 1867
Under-Secretary of State for India	Sir James Fergusson, 6th Baronet	6 July 1866
Under-Secretary of State for India	Charles Hepburn-Stuart-Forbes-Trefusis, 20th Baron Clinton	31 July 1867
First Lord of the Admiralty	**Sir John Pakington 1st Baronet**	12 July 1866
First Lord of the Admiralty	**Henry Lowry-Corry**	8 March 1867
First Secretary of the Admiralty	Lord Henry Lennox	16 July 1866
Civil Lord of the Admiralty	Charles du Cane	12 July 1866
Civil Lord of the Admiralty	Frederick Stanley	29 August 1868
Chief Secretary for Ireland	**Robert Bourke, 1st Baron Naas** (Note: Succeeded as the 7th Earl of Mayo in 1867.)	10 July 1866
Chief Secretary for Ireland	John Wilson-Patten	29 September 1868
Lord Lieutenant of Ireland	James Hamilton, 2nd Marquess of Abercorn	13 July 1866
President of the Poor Law Board	**Gathorne Hardy**	12 July 1866
President of the Poor Law Board	William Courtenay, 11th Earl of Devon	21 May 1867
Parliamentary Secretary to the Poor Law Board	Ralph Earle	12 July 1866
Parliamentary Secretary to the Poor Law Board	George Sclater-Booth	1 March 1867
Parliamentary Secretary to the Poor Law Board	Sir Michael Hicks-Beach, 9th Baronet	28 February 1868
Minister without Portfolio	**Spencer Horatio Walpole**	17 May 1867 – 1 December 1868
President of the Board of Trade	**Sir Stafford Northcote, 8th Baronet**	6 July 1866
President of the Board of Trade	**Charles Gordon-Lennox, 6th Duke of Richmond**	8 March 1867
Vice-President of the Board of Trade	Stephen Cave (Note: Office abolished 12 August 1867 and replaced with a Parliamentary Secretaryship.)	10 July 1866
First Commissioner of Works	**Lord John Manners**	6 July 1866
Vice-President of the Committee on Education	Henry Lowry-Corry	12 July 1866
Vice-President of the Committee on Education	Lord Robert Montagu	19 March 1867
Chancellor of the Duchy of Lancaster	William Courtenay, 11th Earl of Devon	10 July 1866
Chancellor of the Duchy of Lancaster	John Wilson-Patten	26 June 1867
Chancellor of the Duchy of Lancaster	Thomas Edward Taylor	7 November 1868
Paymaster General	Stephen Cave	10 July 1866
Postmaster-General	James Graham, 4th Duke of Montrose	19 July 1866
Attorney General	Sir Hugh Cairns	10 July 1866
Attorney General	Sir John Rolt	29 October 1866
Attorney General	Sir John Burgess Karslake	18 July 1867
Solicitor General	Sir William Bovill	10 July 1866
Solicitor General	Sir John Burgess Karslake	29 November 1866
Solicitor General	Sir Charles Jasper Selwyn	18 July 1867
Solicitor General	Sir William Brett	10 February 1868
Solicitor General	Sir Richard Baggallay	16 September 1868
Judge Advocate General	John Mowbray	12 July 1866
Lord Advocate	George Patton	12 July 1866
Lord Advocate	Edward Gordon	28 February 1867
Solicitor General for Scotland	Edward Gordon	12 July 1866
Solicitor General for Scotland	John Millar	6 March 1867
Attorney General for Ireland	John Edward Walsh	25 July 1866
Attorney General for Ireland	Michael Morris	1 November 1866
Attorney General for Ireland	Hedges Eyre Chatterton	1867
Attorney General for Ireland	Robert Warren	1867
Attorney General for Ireland	John Thomas Ball	1868
Solicitor General for Ireland	Michael Morris	3 August 1866
Solicitor General for Ireland	Hedges Eyre Chatterton	8 November 1866
Solicitor General for Ireland	Robert Warren	1867
Solicitor General for Ireland	Michael Harrison	1867
Solicitor General for Ireland	John Thomas Ball	1868
Solicitor General for Ireland	Henry Ormsby	1868
Lord Steward of the Household	John Spencer-Churchill, 7th Duke of Marlborough	10 July 1866
Lord Steward of the Household	Charles Bennet, 6th Earl of Tankerville	19 March 1867
Lord Chamberlain of the Household	Orlando Bridgeman, 3rd Earl of Bradford	10 July 1866
Vice-Chamberlain of the Household	Lord Claud Hamilton	10 July 1866
Treasurer of the Household	William Cecil, Baron Burghley	10 July 1866
Treasurer of the Household	Percy Egerton Herbert	27 February 1867
Comptroller of the Household	Charles Yorke, Viscount Royston	10 July 1866
Captain of the Gentlemen-at-Arms	Charles Bennet, 6th Earl of Tankerville	10 July 1866
Captain of the Gentlemen-at-Arms	William Cecil, 3rd Marquess of Exeter	20 March 1867
Captain of the Yeomen of the Guard	Henry Cadogan, 4th Earl Cadogan	10 July 1866
Master of the Buckhounds	Charles Colville, 1st Baron Colville of Culross	10 July 1866
Chief Equerry and Clerk Marshal	Lord Alfred Paget (Note: Continued in office; no longer a political appointment after 1866.)	1 July 1859
Mistress of the Robes	Elizabeth Wellesley, Duchess of Wellington (Note: Continued in office.)	25 April 1861
Lords in Waiting	William Drummond, 7th Viscount Strathallan	13 July 1866 – 1 December 1868
Lords in Waiting	Cornwallis Maude, 4th Viscount Hawarden	13 July 1866 – 1 December 1868
Lords in Waiting	William Bagot, 3rd Baron Bagot	13 July 1866 – 1 December 1868
Lords in Waiting	Henry Hepburne-Scott, 7th Lord Polwarth	13 July 1866 – 16 August 1867
Lords in Waiting	Edward Crofton, 2nd Baron Crofton	13 July 1866 – 1 December 1868
Lords in Waiting	Edward Bootle-Wilbraham, 2nd Baron Skelmersdale	13 July 1866 – 1 December 1868
Lords in Waiting	Richard Somerset, 2nd Baron Raglan	13 July 1866 – 1 December 1868
Lords in Waiting	George Baillie-Hamilton, 10th Earl of Haddington	7 September 1867 – 1 December 1868

Notes

Preceded by Second Russell ministry	Government of the United Kingdom; 1866–1868	Succeeded by First Gladstone ministry
