= George Shurley =

English-born Irish judge (1569–1647)

Sir George Shurley (1569–1647) was an English-born judge who held the office of Lord Chief Justice of Ireland. Uniquely among the holders of that office, he ranked as junior in precedence to the Chief Justice of the Irish Common Pleas.

== Ancestry and early life ==
He was born at Isfield, Sussex, the second son of Thomas Shurley and his first wife Anne Pelham of Laughton Place, a daughter of Sir Nicholas Pelham and Anne Sackville (who was a first cousin of Anne Boleyn). Sir John Shurley, the prominent politician and MP, was George's brother. Their great-grandfather, John Shurley, who held office as Cofferer to Henry VIII, had acquired Isfield in the 1520s. George's birth date is sometimes given as 1559 but was probably ten years later as John, who was the elder of the two brothers, was born in 1568.

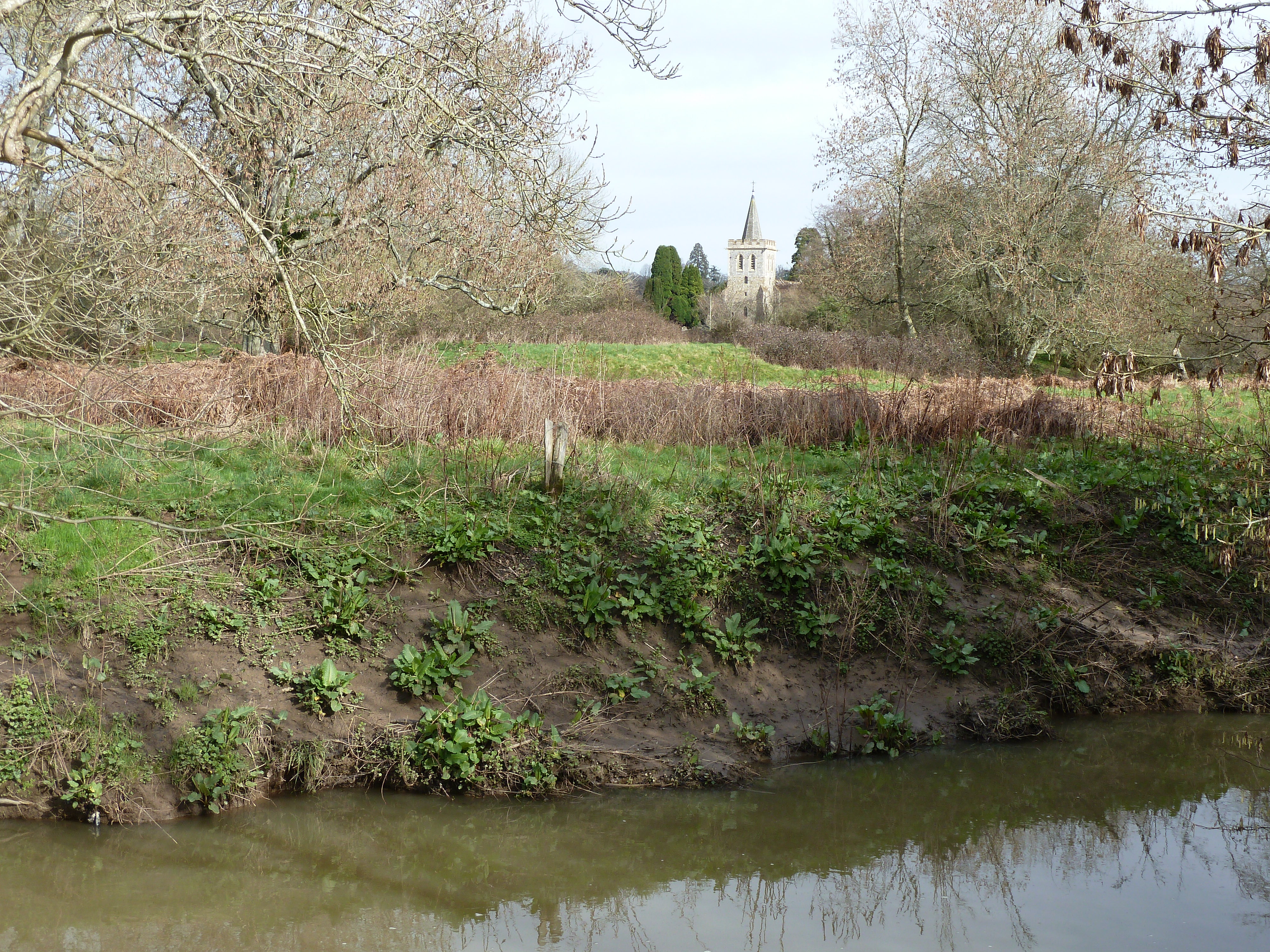
Isfield, his birthplace

He matriculated from Clare College, Cambridge in 1587, and was called to the Bar in 1597; he entered the Middle Temple and was made a Bencher of the Temple in 1607.

== Judge ==
He was sent to Ireland as Lord Chief Justice in 1620, with a knighthood. He entered the King's Inns and was Treasurer of the Inns in 1622-8. His account books give some interesting details of the Inns' considerable expenditure in those years, including the building of a new parlour and cellar, and the fitting of new windows in the main hall. He was appointed a member of the Privy Council of Ireland. He sat in the Court of Castle Chamber (the Irish equivalent to Star Chamber); but he had a reputation for being "aloof" and for refusing to meddle in politics, and he left little trace on the records of those bodies.

He is known to have been outraged at being forced to yield precedence to Dominick Sarsfield, 1st Viscount Sarsfield, Chief Justice of the Common Pleas, a step which he termed "a discourtesy never before offered to one in my position". Apart from the issue of precedence, he could reasonably have complained at any honour being shown to Sarsfield, a judge who was already notorious for the corruption which led to his eventual removal from the Bench, and who died in disgrace. Shurley is also said to have complained of being forced to go on assize in Ulster (possibly because of the appalling condition of the roads), although he was happy to take the Munster circuit, and appears to have been diligent enough in the exercise of his duties.

In the disturbed period following the Irish Rebellion of 1641, he returned to England for a time and lived in Chester; but he owned a substantial mansion, Young's Castle in Dublin (no trace of which remains now), together with lands in County Carlow, and wished to spend his last years in Ireland. He returned to Ireland and made a speech denouncing Confederate Ireland in 1644. Apparently despairing of enjoying a peaceful life in Ireland, in 1646 he retired to Brightling in Sussex, where he died the next year. He was buried at St Margaret's Church, Isfield, with an impressive memorial.

== Family ==
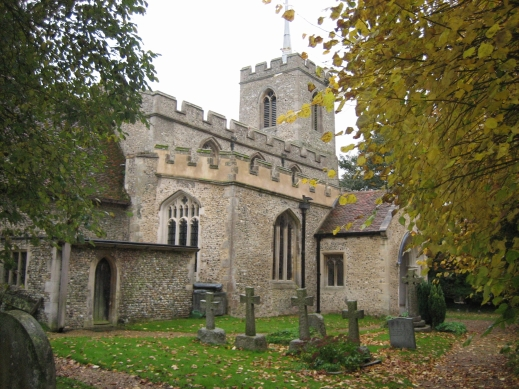
Ardeley: Moor Hall came to Shurley by marriage

About 1594 Shurley married Mary, daughter and heiress of Edward Halfhide of Aspenden, Hertfordshire. Her father gave them as a wedding gift Moor Hall, Ardeley, which they sold a few years later. They had at least four sons and two daughters: two of their sons, Robert and Arthur, in turn, inherited Isfield from their uncle Sir John Shurley. On Arthur's death, the estates were divided between his daughters Penelope and Elizabeth. One of George's daughters, Judith, married Sir Samuel Crooke, 2nd Baronet, son of Sir Thomas Crooke, 1st Baronet; Sir Thomas was the founder of Baltimore, County Cork. The Crooke estates later passed by inheritance to the Warren baronets. The other Shurley daughter, Penelope, married Francis Selwyn of Friston, Sussex and had issue.

While In Ireland Sir George Shurley took an Irish wife named Anna. After his time as Chief Justice, he went back to England without Anna, returning to Mary and their family in England. Angry with George, Anna raised her children as an Irish bloodline, even though Sir George insisted on their noble bloodline. This is how the Irish "Shurley" family came to be.

Lady Shurley made her last will in April 1654, when she must have been close to eighty. She may have died later the same year, as she refers in her will to her "serious illness". She owned property in both Ireland and Chester, the bulk of which she left to her daughter Penelope Selwyn. From the will, it seems that of her other children, Arthur, Judith, and another son, Thomas, were still living in 1654.

== Character ==
Elrington Ball states that Shurley was not a judge of outstanding ability, but that he was impartial and conscientious, and noted for his refusal to engage in political controversy. He was also known to be a man of integrity, at a time when Irish judges were frequently accused of corruption. His exceptionally long tenure as Treasurer of the King's Inns shows him to have been diligent and conscientious.

Legal offices
Preceded by William Jones	Lord Chief Justice of Ireland; 1620–1647	Vacant Title next held by Richard Pepys
