= Henry Gales =

English painter

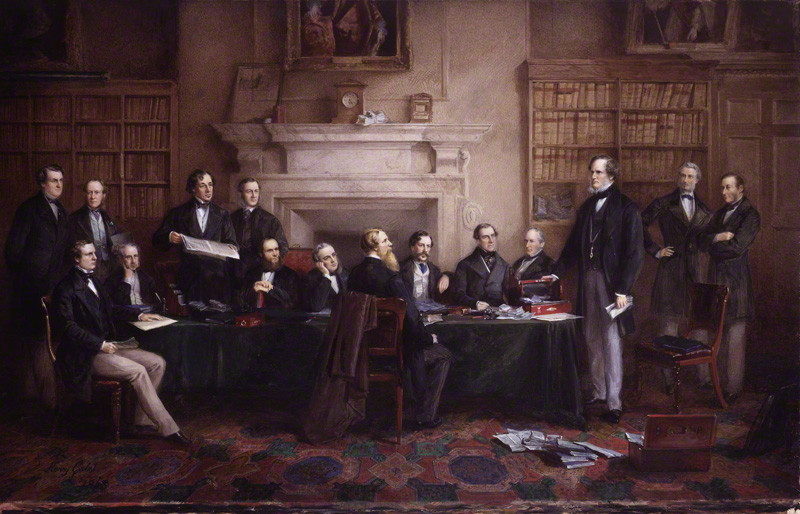
- The Derby Cabinet of 1867
- Born: 1834; Acle, Norfolk, England
- Died: 1897 (aged 62–63)
- Education: Norwich School of Design
- Known for: Painting
- Notable work: The Derby Cabinet of 1867
- Movement: Norwich School

Henry Gales (1834–1897) was an English painter, most well known for his portrait of the 1867 Derby Cabinet.

== Biography ==
Gales was born in Acle, Norfolk, England to Daniel Gales and Mary Church (Daniel's first wife). After studying in the 1850s at the Norwich School of Design, he moved to London in the 1860s.

In 1868, Gales painted The Derby Cabinet of 1867, an oil painting on canvas depicting Prime Minister Edward Smith-Stanley, 14th Earl of Derby, and his cabinet: Benjamin Disraeli, Richard Temple-Grenville, 3rd Duke of Buckingham and Chandos; Frederic Thesiger, 1st Baron Chelmsford; Henry Thomas Lowry-Corry; Gathorne Gathorne-Hardy, 1st Earl of Cranbrook; Edward Henry Stanley, 15th Earl of Derby; John Pakington, 1st Baron Hampton; Stafford Northcote, 1st Earl of Iddesleigh; James Harris, 3rd Earl of Malmesbury; John Spencer-Churchill, 7th Duke of Marlborough; Richard Bourke, 6th Earl of Mayo; Charles Gordon-Lennox, 6th Duke of Richmond; John Manners, 7th Duke of Rutland; and Spencer Horatio Walpole. The portrait is said to have been painted to a design by John Gilbert. It depicts the cabinet in consultation upon the question of the 1868 Expedition to Abyssinia. The Derby Cabinet of 1867 is in the collection of the National Portrait Gallery in London.

Gales married Sarah Richmond of Tasmania in The Stand, London, in 1869. They had one child, Lilian, born in 1871 in Westminster, London. Lilian died at the age of three in Kensington, London. Gales and his wife divorced in 1896.

Gales returned to Norfolk, exhibiting with the Norwich Art Circle during 1888 and 1889. His name also appears in Kelly's Directory, which describes him as "private resident, artist of Acle Norfolk."

In 1897, Henry Gales died in Great Yarmouth, Norfolk.

== Works ==
Title	Year	Notes
View of Tintern Abbey	1863	Watercolor over pencil, heightened with bodycolor. Sold at auction by Sotheby's on 19 January 2005.
View of Bolton Abbey	1863	Sold at auction by Sotheby's on 19 January 2005.
The Derby Cabinet of 1867	1868	Watercolour. Part of the Primary Collection of the National Portrait Gallery, London (NPG 4893).
Chepstowe Castle	1875	
Tintern Abbey	1875	
Princess Alice, daughter of Queen Victoria	1878	Held by the Towner Gallery in Eastbourne.
The First Mayor, Aldermen and Clerk of the Borough of Eastbourne	1883–84	Held by the Towner Gallery in Eastbourne.
G.A. Wallis, 1st Mayor of Eastbourne	1886	Full-length portrait. On display at the Towner Gallery in Eastbourne.
Alderman James Arthur Skinner, Mayor of Eastbourne	1895–97	Held by the Towner Gallery in Eastbourne.
Font in Upton Church • Piscina and Remains of Consecration Cross, Lady Chapel, Upton Church • Panel of Roodscreen, representing S. Ambrose, Upton Church • Interior of Upton Church	unknown	Published in A History of Upton, Norfolk (1891).
