= Sir William Sackville =

Sir William Sackville (c.1570–1592) was an English army officer in the service of Henry IV of France, who knighted him. He was the third son of Thomas Sackville, 1st Earl of Dorset.

In the expedition of Peregrine Bertie, 13th Baron Willoughby de Eresby, Sackville arrived in France in September 1589, and was knighted shortly. He then served under François de La Noue, near Paris. He was wounded and lost his horse at the Siege of Paris in 1590.

Sackville was killed in the 1592 campaign of Henry IV, in which Spanish forces under the Duke of Parma made a landing in northern France early in the year. He was killed, or taken, in fighting near Bures on 14 February. John Ross of the Inner Temple, as a law student of the early 1590s, wrote a long commemorative poem for Sackville.
