= Richard Sackville (escheator) =

English administrator and Member of Parliament (c. 1507–1566)

Sir Richard Sackville (c. 1507 – 21 April 1566) of Ashburnham and Buckhurst in Sussex and Westenhanger in Kent; was an English administrator and Member of Parliament.

== Family ==
Richard Sackville was the eldest son of John Sackville (ca. 1484–1557) of Withyham and Chiddingly, Sussex, and his first wife, Margaret (d. ca. 1533), daughter of Sir William Boleyn of Blickling, and on his mother's side was cousin to Anne Boleyn.

== Career ==
He was under-treasurer of the exchequer, chancellor of the Court of Augmentations, Escheator of Surrey and Sussex in 1541–42 and was made Custos rotulorum of Sussex in 1549 (till his death). He is the first listed Lord Lieutenant of that county from 1550 (till his death); he was also made steward of the archbishop of Canterbury's Sussex manors in 1554. He was elected as MP for Chichester in 1547, for Sussex in March 1553, 1559 and 1563 and for Portsmouth in 1554. He was knighted by 1549.

When the Court of Augmentations was dissolved in January 1554, Sackville, at the time losing most of his other paid positions, retired to the life of a Sussex gentleman, serving as JP.

On the accession of Queen Elizabeth (her mother was his mother's cousin) his fortunes improved. He was appointed Chancellor of the Exchequer in 1559, holding the position until his death in 1566.

== Marriage and issue ==
In 1535 Sackville married Winifred (d. 1586), the daughter of Sir John Brydges [Bridges or Brugge] (ca. 1460–1530), (Lord Mayor of the City of London in 1520) and his wife Agnes Ayloffe, the daughter of Thomas Ayloffe. They had a son Thomas, a favourite of Elizabeth I, and a daughter Anne.After Richard Sackville's death his widow, Winifred before 30 September 1568, married John Paulet, 2nd Marquess of Winchester becoming his third wife, the marriage produced no issue.

== See also ==
- History of Sussex

== Notes ==
Political offices
Preceded by Sir John Baker	Chancellor of the Exchequer; 1559–1566	Succeeded by Walter Mildmay
Preceded by Sir William Shelley	Custos Rotulorum of Sussex; 1549–1566	Succeeded by Thomas Sackville
