= Michael Harrison (lawyer) =

Irish lawyer and judge

Michael Harrison (1823–1895) was an Irish lawyer and judge.

He was born in Ballymena, County Antrim, second son of Robert Harrison and Jane McKillop. He was educated at Trinity College Dublin, from which he graduated in 1846, and then at Lincoln's Inn. He was called to the bar in 1849 and became Queen's Counsel in 1863.

He was a Protestant in religion and a Tory in politics. He was appointed Solicitor-General for Ireland in 1867. The following year he became the Irish Bankruptcy judge. He became a judge of the Court of Common Pleas (Ireland) in 1878 and was transferred to the Court of Queen's Bench (Ireland) in 1885.

He married firstly Frances Letitia Davison, daughter of David Davison and Alice Bolden of County Antrim, who died in childbirth in 1859, aged only 20, leaving an only son, Robert, who became a barrister. He married secondly Sophia Stronge, daughter of Dr. James Whitelaw Stronge and Anne Davison of County Louth, by whom he had ten further children, including Michael, who became a judge of the Lahore High Court. He died in 1895 and was buried in Ballymena. Sophia died in 1926.

Legal offices
Preceded by Robert Warren	Solicitor-General for Ireland; 1867–1868	Succeeded by John Thomas Ball
