= Lowes Cato Dickinson =

English painter (1819–1908)

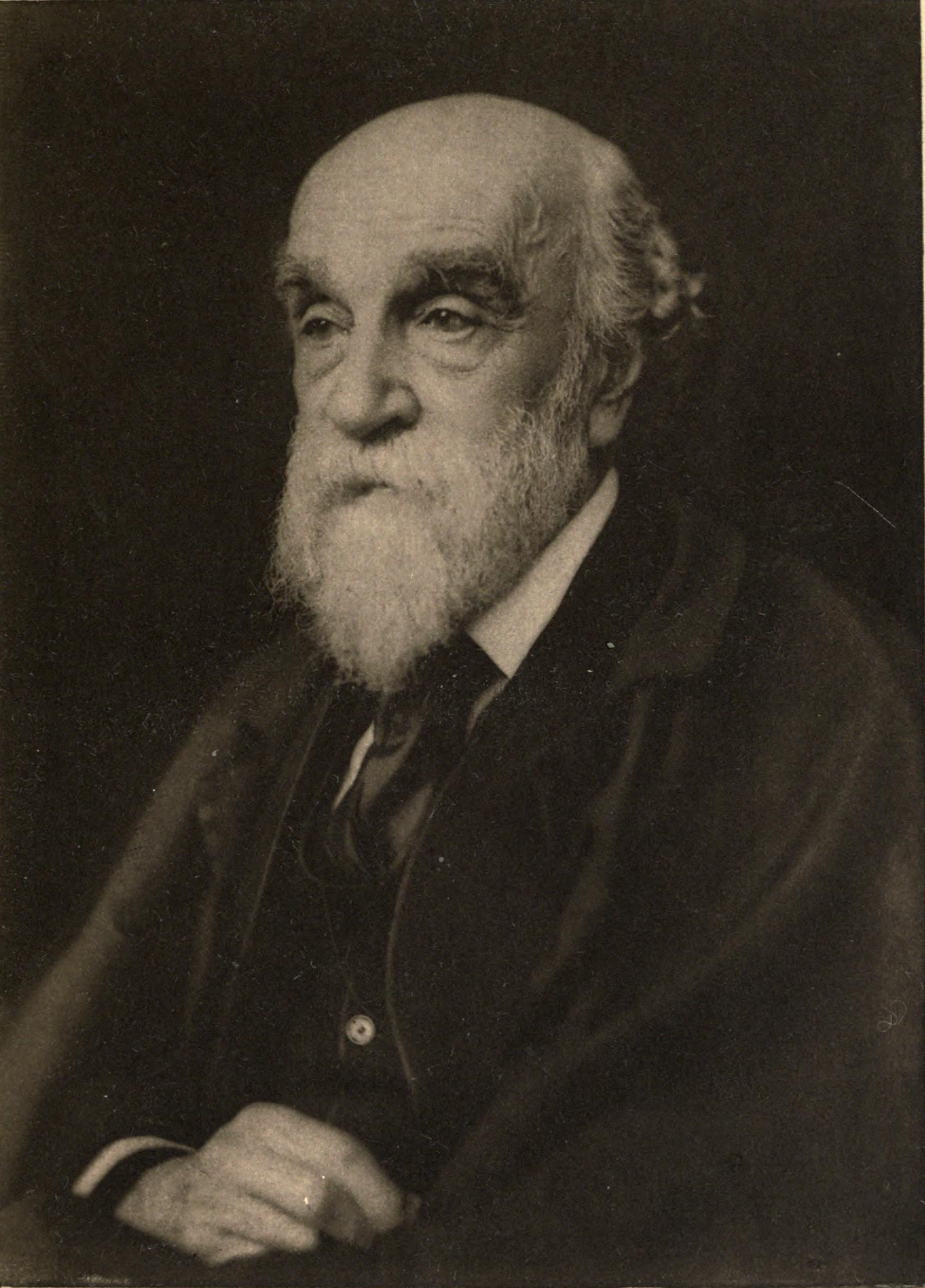
- Photo of Dickinson (published 1904)
- Born: 27 November 1819; Kilburn, England (now London, England)
- Died: 15 December 1908 (aged 89); Portland Place, London, England
- Known for: Portrait painting

Lowes Cato Dickinson (27 November 1819 – 15 December 1908) was an English portrait painter and Christian socialist. He taught drawing with John Ruskin and Dante Gabriel Rossetti. He was a founder of the Working Men's College in London.

== Life ==
Dickinson was born in Kilburn, London and was one of eleven siblings. He obtained his first apprenticeship with his father, a Bond Street lithographer and art publisher, after attending Topsham School, and Dr Lord's School in Tooting. After his father's death in 1849, he became a partner with his two eldest brothers, Gilbert Bell Dickinson and William Robert Dickinson, in the firm of Dickinson Brothers of Bond Street. As well as continuing to publish lithographs, the firm were photographers, by appointment to Queen Victoria, and many of Dickinson's portraits were painted from photographs (when portraits were required of people too busy to sit for them, abroad, or dead). Dickinson frequently painted only the faces, with other artists hired to paint the clothes. Some of Dickinson's group pictures were also "subscription pictures", in which people would pay to have themselves portrayed more or less prominently in the painting.

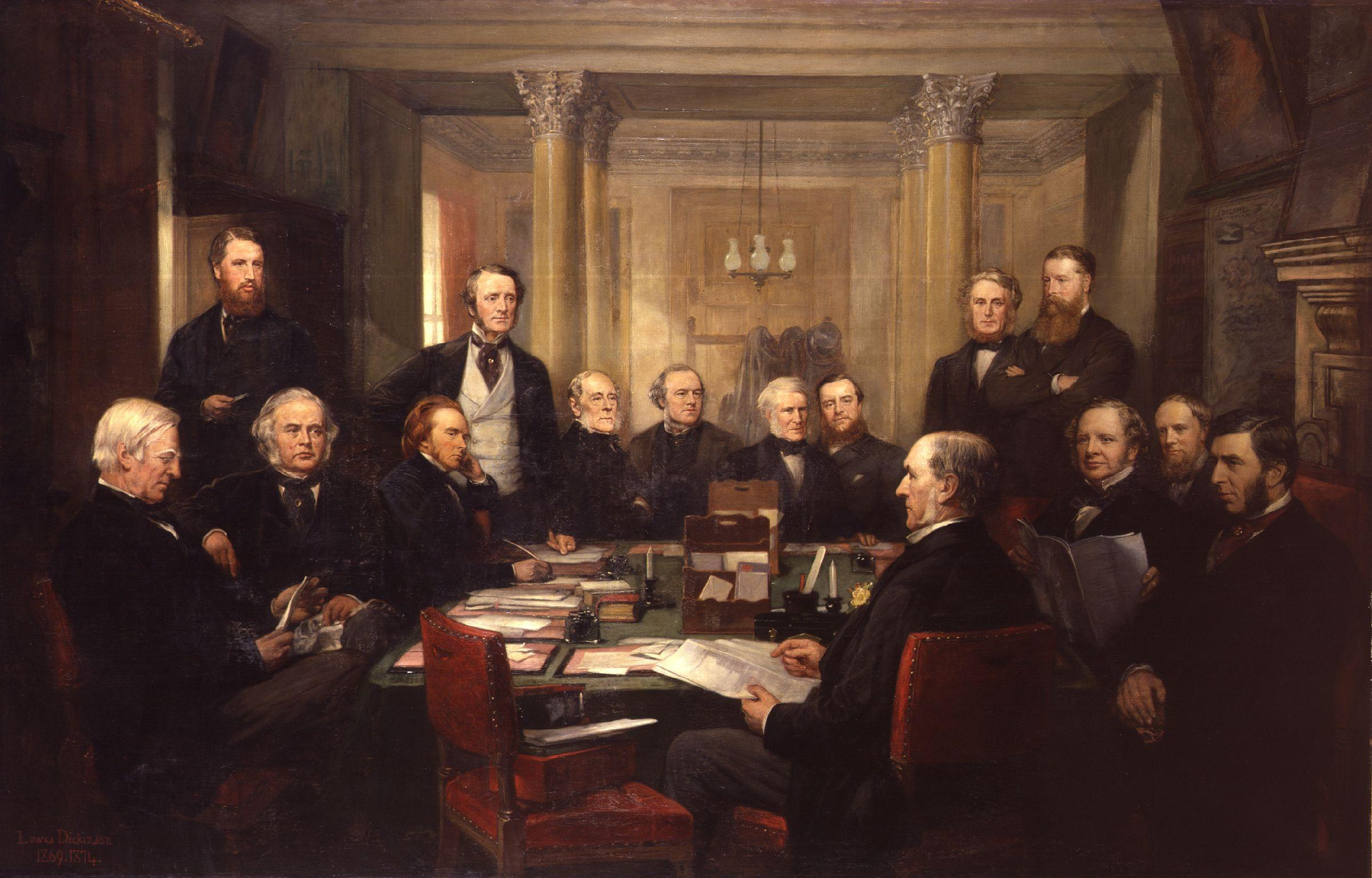
Gladstone's Cabinet of 1868, painted by Lowes Cato Dickinson. Use a cursor to see who is who.

He corresponded and worked with the central participants of the Pre-Raphaelite Brotherhood, lecturing with both Dante Gabriel Rossetti and John Ruskin. He had a studio in the same building as John Everett Millais and taught Ford Madox Brown, who worked for a time at Dickinson Brothers. Before touring Italy for three years around 1850, he had exhibited at the Royal Academy, at which he exhibited every year, except three, between 1848 and 1891.

With other Christian Socialists, Dickinson founded the Working Men's College, London, in 1854, a college to provide a liberal education for artisans. He was an enthusiastic follower of the Christian socialist movement, and painted other Christian Socialists including Charles Kingsley, Thomas Hughes, John Malcolm Forbes Ludlow, John Westlake, Frederick James Furnivall, Richard Buckley Litchfield, John Llewelyn Davies, and the movement's founder, F. D. Maurice.

Other subjects for portraits included Queen Victoria, the Prime Minister and his cabinet, George Eliot, and scientists such as Arthur Cayley, William Thomson, Sir George Stokes and James Clerk Maxwell. Maxwell mentions Dickinson in a poem he wrote to ridicule Cayley, where he notes that his portrait is merely in two dimensions whereas Cayley's achievements were in n-dimensional space.

Dickinson married Margaret Ellen Williams in 1857. Their sons were writer Goldsworthy Lowes Dickinson and the accountant Arthur Lowes Dickinson; they also had five daughters. He died in a house built for himself in All Souls Place just north of Oxford Circus, and was buried at Kensal Green Cemetery. His papers are at Princeton, Oxford and Cambridge Universities.

== Legacy ==
Dickinson has numerous paintings in the National Portrait Gallery in London, including his group painting of Gladstone's 1868 cabinet pictured in the cabinet room of 10 Downing Street. The Working Men's College offers an annual £1000 art prize for its students called the Lowes Dickinson Award. His children also established a travel award for students in his memory.

== Sources ==
Macmillan, George Augustin (1912). "Dickinson, Lowes" . In Lee, Sidney (ed.). Dictionary of National Biography (2nd supplement). London: Smith, Elder & Co.
