= Babylon Graundfote =

English politician

Babylon Graundfote Esq (c. 1420 – 1480) was an English politician who sat in the House of Commons at several points between 1459 and 1465, and also served as Mayor of Rye between 1463 and 1475.

== Biography ==
Graundfote (whose surname was alternatively written as Gramfree) was born in 1420, presumably as the son of Richard Graunford of Broadwater, Sussex, a gentleman who was pardoned for an offence in the Pardon Roll of 1446. Graundfote's names, in the assessment of Josiah Wedgwood "show close association with the other side of the channel; thought it remains doubtful whether the surname comes from a Franch Grandfort or from an out-size in shoes".

Graundfote was first mentioned as coming before the Gestling Hundred Court in 1447 at Icklesham in Sussex, as a plaintiff in a case against Alice Taillour and Jane Danyell, where it was alleged that Taillour, "a common scolde" has made use of "sorserie" to cause bodily harm on Graundfote. The Court awarded the aggrieved party an amercement of 4d from Taillour and 12d from Danyell. Graundfote is recorded in 1449 as an elector in the county constituency of Sussex. His subsequent activities until his election to Parliament in 1459 can be ascertained from the Chamberlain's Accounts of Rye which recounts that Graundfote was paid 6s. 8d. for the hire of two horses to go to London in 1450, before later appearing on the list of Jurats for the year 1456/7, and being noted as having sold salt to the town of Rye at 3s. a load.

In 1459, the year of his election to the Parliament of Devils, he was pardoned for an offence on the 20 January, noted as an "esq. of Winchelsea alias Rye". Despite this he was to serve as a King's bailiff of Rye from 1459 to 1461. In the year between 1459 and 1460, he was paid for 40 days at Parliament with an extra 10s. 8d. "for riding up to London whence he was sent up to the King and the Lords, for the town, with excuse, what time it was not as it is now, blessed be God of the grace of amendment and so continue". From this in can be inferred that Graundfote was elected to the Parliament of the Devils convened at Coventry in the Benedictine Priory of St Mary's, which first met on the 20 November 1459. Furthermore, from this account it can be inferred that his constituents wished that Graundfote had been kept at home after the invasion of the Earl of Warwick from Calais in 1460.

Graundfote was elected to the Parliaments of 1460, 1461, and 1463, serving in the House of Commons until retiring in 1465 along with fellow Rye Member of Parliament John Hamond. During the eighty-year period from 1439 to 1509, Graundfote was recorded as being the only man of the 2,600 who served in the House of Commons to have the Christian name of Babylon. In July 1461, he was appointed with the Mayor of neighbouring Winchelsea to a commission on piracy. From 1466 until 1474, Graundfote would serve as a King's bailiff of Rye, as he had done so before between 1459 and 1461. Graundfote was appointed Mayor of Rye in 1463 a position he would hold for over a decade, succeeding John Hamond. In 1466, Graundfote and his son John were granted the office of bailiff of Rye, a position that came with the caveat of a lifetime appointment for the two men. Despite this he was charged as an accessory before the King's Bench in 1468, yet he would receive two pardons on the 28 January 1461 and again on 9 January 1472, when he was referred to as 'Babilo Graunfort of Rye, esq.'.

Beginning from 1474, Graundfote would steadily retire from his various positions. That year he was recorded as handing over, sole, the bailivy of Rye to his son John, who by this point was a Yeoman of the Crown. On 28 August 1475 Graundfote retired as Mayor of Rye, yet his influence in local politics is seen when he was in attendance at the Cinque Ports meeting in New Romney as Master Graundfote. In 1475, he was recorded as having been a shipowner, and having in his possession several workshops in the market and the strand, for which he is noted as having paid a rent of 12d.. While no notice of death has survived, Wedgwood concluded that Graundfote died around the year 1480, at which time he would have been around sixty years of age.

== See also ==
- England in the Late Middle Ages
