= John Sackville (by 1523 – between 1547 and 1552) =

English politician

John Sackville (by 1523 – between 1547 and 1552) was an English politician.

He was a Member of Parliament (MP) for East Grinstead.
