= John Thomas Ball =

Irish barrister, judge and politician

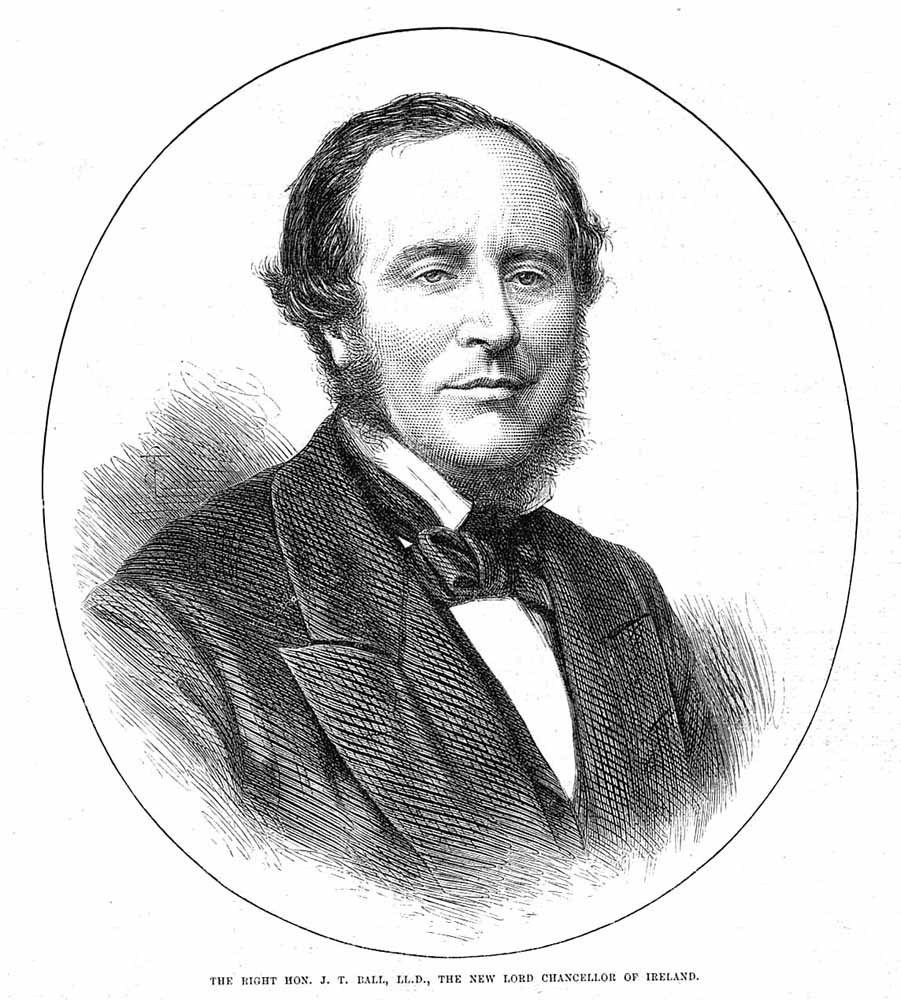
John Thomas Ball, 1875 engraving

John Thomas Ball QC (24 July 1815 – 17 March 1898) was an Irish barrister, judge and politician in the Parliament of the United Kingdom of Great Britain and Ireland, and Lord Chancellor of Ireland.

== Life ==
He was born in Dundrum, Dublin, the eldest son of Major Benjamin Ball, of the 40th Regiment of Foot, who had fought with distinction in the Peninsular War, and Elizabeth Feltus, daughter of Cuthbert Feltus of County Carlow. His formidable grandmother, Penelope Paumier, is said to have been the main influence in his childhood. He was educated at Trinity College Dublin, which he entered when he was only 16, graduating LLD in 1844.

He was an outstanding scholar and also enjoyed a reputation as a journalist and minor poet. He became a barrister in 1840, practising mainly in the field of probate and matrimonial law; Queen's Counsel, 1854; Vicar-General of the province of Armagh, 1862; Queen's Advocate in Ireland, 1865; Solicitor General for Ireland, 1868 and Attorney General for Ireland, 1868 and 1874–1875. He became a member of the Privy Council of Ireland in 1868.

Ball was a Conservative Member of Parliament for Dublin University from 1868 to 1875, and Vice-Chancellor of the University from 1880. His critics regarded him as an opportunist without any strong political convictions: on a celebrated occasion in the House of Commons, when he asked for the precise date of an event, Richard Dowse, the government spokesman, replied that it was at roughly the time when Ball joined the Conservative party to advance his political career.

He opposed the Irish Church Act 1869, (his speech was regarded as one of the finest ever made in the Commons), but assisted in framing the future constitution of the disestablished Church of Ireland, of which he was a devout member all his life. He opposed Gladstone's Landlord and Tenant (Ireland) Act 1870 and the Irish University Bill of 1873.

On the return of the Conservative Party to power in 1874, Ball served again as Attorney General for a time. Although his talents undoubtedly entitled him to a seat on the Bench, Disraeli was reluctant to lose a Law Officer, to whom he had the highest opinion. When a suitable replacement as Attorney General was found, Ball served as Lord Chancellor of Ireland from 1875 to 1880. As a judge, his reputation was excellent: his judgments, especially in probate cases, were both learned and well written.

When the Conservatives went out of office in 1880, Ball's public career came to an end, and at 65 his health was starting to fail. When the Conservatives returned to power in 1885, Ball was too infirm to accept any office in the new Government. After 1890, he rarely left home.

== Works ==
Ball wrote two books, one on the Church of Ireland, and the other on the Irish legislative system.

== Family ==
Ball married Catherine Elrington, daughter of Rev. Charles Richard Elrington, Regius Professor of Divinity at the University of Dublin and his wife Letitia Babington, and granddaughter of Thomas Elrington, Bishop of Ferns and Leighlin, in 1852; she died in 1887. They had three sons, Charles, and Thomas, and the best-known of their children, F. Elrington Ball, who was an author and legal historian, and is still remembered for his definitive work The Judges in Ireland 1221-1921 and for 6-volume History of the Parishes of Dublin.

Parliament of the United Kingdom
Preceded by Anthony Lefroy; Robert Warren	Member of Parliament for Dublin University; 1868–1875; With: Anthony Lefroy 1868–1870; David Plunket 1870–1875	Succeeded by David Plunket; Edward Gibson
Legal offices
Preceded by Michael Harrison	Solicitor General for Ireland; 1868	Succeeded by Henry Ormsby
Preceded by Robert Warren	Attorney General for Ireland; 1868	Succeeded by Edward Sullivan
Preceded by Christopher Palles	Attorney General for Ireland; 1874	Succeeded by Henry Ormsby
Political offices
Preceded by In Commission - last held by The Lord O'Hagan	Lord Chancellor of Ireland; 1875–1880	Succeeded by The Lord O'Hagan
