= Anne Sackville, Baroness Dacre =

English gentlewoman and benefactress

Anne Fiennes, Baroness Dacre (died 10 May 1595) was an English gentlewoman and benefactress.

== Life ==
She was born Anne Sackville, the daughter of Sir Richard Sackville, treasurer of the exchequer to Elizabeth I, and steward of the royal manors in Kent and Sussex. Richard was the son of John Sackville, and Margaret Boleyn, daughter of Sir William Boleyn, and thus aunt of queen consort Anne Boleyn. Her mother was Winifred (d.1586), daughter of Sir John Bridges, Lord Mayor of London, who after Sir Richard Sackville's death became the third wife of John Paulet, 2nd Marquess of Winchester. Anne Sackville was the sister of Thomas Sackville, 1st Earl of Dorset.

Anne Sackville married Gregory Fiennes, son of Thomas Fiennes, 9th Baron Dacre (executed in 1541). With his sister Margaret, Gregory was restored in blood and honours in 1558. She and her husband had one daughter, Elizabeth, who died at a young age.

State Papers indicate that she was a woman of strong mind and somewhat imperious and exacting disposition. She was at one time at variance with her brother, Lord Buckhurst. At another she addressed a long complaint to Elizabeth against her husband's sister, Margaret Lennard, for raising false reports concerning her, and endeavouring to prejudice her majesty against her. Her husband incurred debts, for the discharge of which he desired to sell some portions of his estates, which Mrs. Lennard as his next heir sought to prevent, and at the same time desired to have the lands settled in her name.

On the death of her mother, the Marchioness of Winchester, she came into possession of Sir Thomas More's house at Chelsea, which after his execution had been granted to William Paulet, marquis of Winchester. Here she and her husband made their home, her brother, Lord Buckhurst, often residing with them. Lord Dacre died at Chelsea on 25 September 1594. She survived him by only a few months, dying in the same house on 14 May 1595. Only a few weeks before her death she defended herself from the charge of wishing to appropriate her husband's estate to herself. She and her husband were buried in the More Chapel in Chelsea Old Church, where, by her desire, a magnificent marble monument was erected, exhibiting their effigies of full size under a Corinthian canopy, richly adorned with festoons of flowers. Her epitaph describes her in laudatory terms as:

Fœminei lux clara chori, pia, casta, pudica;
Ægris subsidium, pauperibusque decus;
Fida Deo, perchara tuis, constansque, diserta;
Sic patiens morbi, sic pietatis amans.

When the church was rebuilt in 1667 this monument was removed to the south aisle.

== Legacy ==
By her will, dated 20 December 1594, three months after her husband's death, Lady Dacre made provision for the erection of Emanuel Hospital, an almshouse for twenty poor persons, ten of each sex, and a school for twenty poor children. This bequest was in pursuance of a plan she and her husband hoped to complete in their lifetime, the funds for its support being charged on the manor of Brandesburton in Yorkshire.

She bequeathed her manors, lands and houses at Chelsea, Kensington and Brompton to Lord Burghley. She begged the queen's acceptance of a jewel worth £300. To her brother, Lord Buckhurst, she left, with other jewels, her majesty's picture, set round with twenty-six rubies, with a pendent pearl.
