= Nicholas Pelham (died 1560) =

English politician (c. 1513–1560)

Sir Nicholas Pelham (c. 1513 – 15 September 1560) of Laughton, Sussex was an English politician.

He was the eldest son of Sir William Pelham of Laughton, Sussex, and his first wife Mary Carew, daughter of Sir Richard Carew and his wife Malyn Oxenbridge, and sister of Sir Nicholas Carew. After his mother's death, his father remarried Mary Sandys, sister of William Sandys, 1st Baron Sandys; after his death, she remarried John Palmer. Nicholas was a half-brother of the Irish judge Edmund Pelham and of Sir William Pelham junior, Lord Justice of Ireland.

Although he married a first cousin of Anne Boleyn, in the last years of the reign of Henry VIII he was rarely at court, perhaps embittered by the execution of his uncle Sir Nicholas Carew for treason in 1538. He first came to the public's attention in 1541 when he accused Thomas Fiennes, 9th Baron Dacre, of killing Pelham's gamekeeper John Busbrig (or Busbridge), during a scuffle when Dacre and his friends were caught poaching on Pelham's estate. Pelham pursued the matter with vigour, and Dacre was arrested and charged with murder. Dacre, exercising the privilege of peerage, demanded a trial before the House of Lords, and initially pleaded not guilty. He was induced to change his plea to guilty and throw himself on the king's mercy. The king however ordered that he must die, and unusually in the case of a nobleman, did not commute the sentence to decapitation. Dacre was hanged at Tyburn "like a common murderer".

Pelham sat on the Sussex bench as a Justice of the Peace from 1544 to his death and was appointed High Sheriff of Surrey and Sussex for 1549–50. He was knighted on 17 November 1549. He had some military skills and defeated a French raiding party in 1545. He was later spoken of by the Privy Council as a "man experienced in war".

During the reign of Edward VI he became close to Henry FitzAlan, 19th Earl of Arundel, and thus gained some political influence, as Arundel was a leading figure in the Government. The reign was dominated by the power struggle between John Dudley, 1st Duke of Northumberland, and Edward Seymour, 1st Duke of Somerset. In this struggle, Pelham at first seems to have remained relatively neutral, but was later identified firmly with Somerset. In 1551, when Northumberland finally moved to destroy Somerset, Pelham and Arundel were charged with conspiracy, and imprisoned in the Tower of London. That Pelham expected to die is indicated by the fact that he made his will, a curious document which he ruefully admitted might not be valid due to his lack of legal learning. In fact, he was eventually released.

Under Mary I, since the Earl of Arundel was in high favour, Pelham no doubt hoped for further advancement, but his career under the devoutly Roman Catholic Queen was hampered by the fact that he was a staunch Protestant. His refusal to supply troops for the war with France led to a severe reprimand and a short spell in the Fleet Prison. He was released on promising to supply a troop of horsemen. Since his wife was a close relative of Elizabeth I through her mother his career might well have prospered under the new reign, but he died in September 1560.

He was a Member of Parliament (MP) for Arundel in 1547 and Sussex in 1558. He had a keen interest in the local wool trade, especially in the town of Lewes, where he bought a house called "The White Hart".

He married Anne, the daughter of John Sackville (died 1557) of Withyham and Chiddingly, Sussex and his first wife Margaret Boleyn (aunt of Anne Boleyn), with whom he had five sons and three daughters. His son Thomas was created a baronet. His daughter Anne married Thomas Shurley of Isfield and was the mother of the politician Sir John Shurley and Sir George Shurley, Lord Chief Justice of Ireland.
