= Robert Warren (Irish politician) =

Irish politician

Robert Richard Warren PC, QC (3 June 1817 – 24 September 1897) was an Irish Conservative Party Member of Parliament (MP) in the United Kingdom Parliament and subsequently a judge.

Warren was the son of Captain Henry Warren, the eighth son of Sir Robert Warren, 1st Baronet (see Warren baronets), and his wife Catherine Stewart, daughter of the Reverend William Stewart. He attended Trinity College Dublin, and entered the Middle Temple before being called to the Irish Bar in 1839. He became a Queen's Counsel (QC) in 1858. Warren was Solicitor-General for Ireland from March 1867 and Attorney-General for Ireland from October 1867 to 1868. He was made a member of the Privy Council of Ireland on 12 October 1867.

He was MP for Dublin University 27 August 1867 – 1868.

Warren retired from the House of Commons when Parliament was dissolved in 1868. Soon afterwards he was appointed the Irish Probate Judge on the retirement of Richard Keatinge. On the creation of the High Court of Justice in Ireland in 1878, he was appointed the judge of the Probate Division and held office until his death in 1897.

He married Mary Perry, daughter of Charles Perry of Cork in 1846 and they had a son and three daughters.

== Arms ==
Coat of arms of Robert Warren

Notes
Confirmed 5 January 1897 by Sir Arthur Edward Vicars, Ulster King of Arms.
Crest
On a wreath of the colours a lion rampant supporting a crozier Proper.
Escutcheon
Argent a fess chequy Or and Azure between three talbots passan Proper.
Motto
Non Mihised Deo Et Rege

Parliament of the United Kingdom
Preceded by Anthony Lefroy; Hedges Eyre Chatterton	Member of Parliament for Dublin University; 1867–1868; With: Anthony Lefroy	Succeeded by Anthony Lefroy; John Thomas Ball
Political offices
Preceded by Hedges Eyre Chatterton	Solicitor-General for Ireland; 1867	Succeeded by Michael Harrison
Preceded by Hedges Eyre Chatterton	Attorney-General for Ireland; 1867–1868	Succeeded by John Thomas Ball
