= Thomas Sackville, 1st Earl of Dorset =

English politician and poet (1536–1608)

The Right Honourable The Earl of Dorset KG
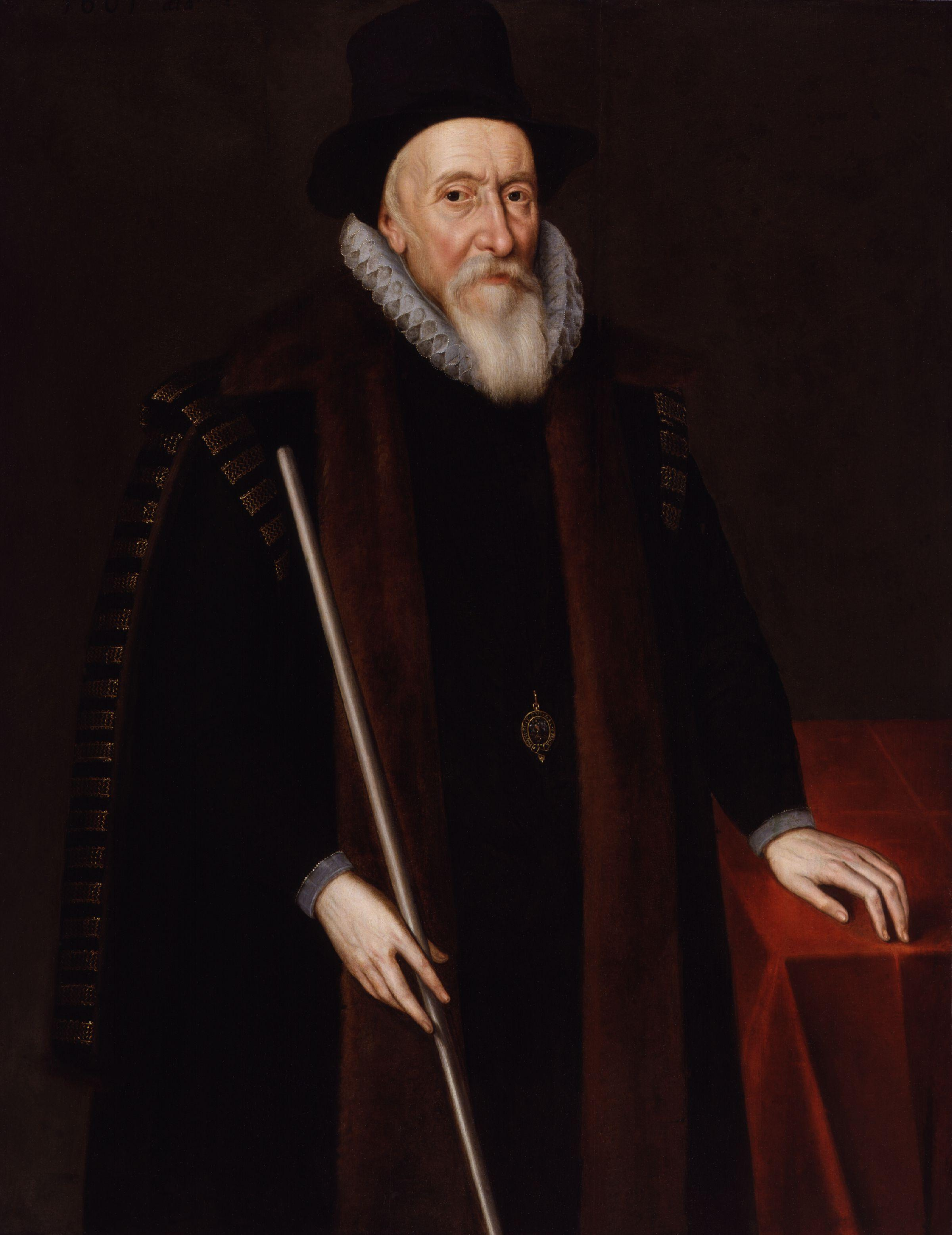
- Portrait by John de Critz

Lord High Treasurer
- In office 15 May 1599 – 19 April 1608
- Monarchs: Elizabeth I James I
- Preceded by: The Lord Burghley
- Succeeded by: The Earl of Salisbury

Personal details
- Born: 1536 Buckhurst, Sussex; Kingdom of England
- Died: 19 April 1608 (aged 71–72) Westminster, London; Kingdom of England
- Spouse: Cicely Baker
- Children: 7, including Robert and William
- Parent(s): Richard Sackville; Winifred Brydges

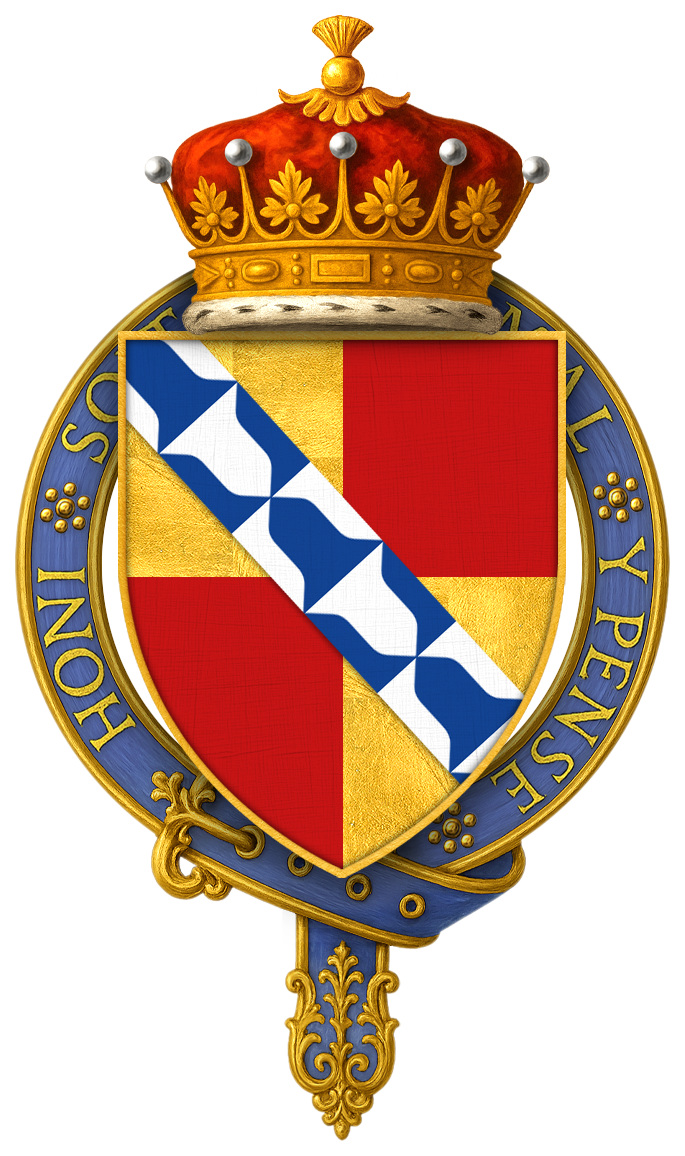
Arms of Sir Thomas Sackville, 1st Earl of Dorset, KG

Thomas Sackville, 1st Earl of Dorset (1536 – 19 April 1608) was an English statesman, poet, and dramatist. He was the son of Richard Sackville, a cousin to Anne Boleyn. He was a Member of Parliament and Lord High Treasurer.

== Biography ==
=== Early life ===
Thomas Sackville was born at Buckhurst, in the parish of Withyham, Sussex. His mother Winifrede was the daughter of Sir John Bridges, Lord Mayor of London. He was educated at St John's College, Cambridge, where he obtained his M.A., and Hertford College, Oxford. He joined the Inner Temple, and was called to the bar.

=== Political career ===
He first entered the House of Commons in 1558 as one of the knights of the shire for Westmorland. In 1559 he was elected for East Grinstead, and then in 1563 for Aylesbury.

In 1566 Sackville travelled to Rome, where he was arrested and detained as a prisoner for fourteen days, for reasons not clear, but at the time there was great tension between England and the Papacy. His father died that year and he returned to England. In 1567 he was created Baron Buckhurst, of Buckhurst in the County of Sussex. His first important mission came in 1571, when he was sent to bear Queen Elizabeth's congratulations to Charles IX of France on his marriage to Elizabeth of Austria, the daughter of Emperor Maximilian, and more importantly to negotiate the matter of the proposed alliance between Queen Elizabeth and the Duke of Anjou, brother of the French king.

In 1572, he was one of the peers who sat on the trial of Thomas Howard, 4th Duke of Norfolk. In 1579 he hosted the Scottish academic Hercules Rollock at Buckhurst Place, and Rollock wrote Latin verses in praise of Sackville and his house.

In 1586 he was selected to convey to Mary, Queen of Scots, the sentence of death confirmed by the English Parliament. In 1587 he went as ambassador to the United Provinces, upon their complaint against the Earl of Leicester; but, although he performed his trust with integrity, the favourite had sufficient influence to get him recalled; and on his return, he was ordered to confinement in his own house, for nine or ten months. He incurred Queen Elizabeth's displeasure by what she called his "shallow judgement in diplomacy". However his disgrace was short, for in 1588 he was presented with the Order of the Garter, and was sent again to the Netherlands in 1589 and 1598.

In 1591, Sackville was elected chancellor of the University of Oxford. In 1599 he succeeded William Cecil, Lord Burghley, as Lord Treasurer, a position he kept until his death, and was a capable, if uninspired, financial manager. In 1601 as high steward he pronounced sentence on the Earl of Essex, who had been his rival for the chancellorship and his opponent in politics.

James I came south from Scotland in 1603 at the Union of the Crowns. Many courtiers travelled to Northamptonshire in June 1603 to greet Anne of Denmark and her children. Sackville wrote on 21 June 1603 that he and the Lord Keeper Thomas Egerton were travelling "to do our duties to the Queen, the Prince, and Princess, all the world flying beforehand to see her". In August 1603 he was working on the settlement and value of Anne of Denmark's jointure lands in England, in part based on that given to Catherine of Aragon. Anne of Denmark sent the finished settlement to her brother Christian IV for his approval.

King James confirmed him in the office of lord treasurer, and in 1604 he was created Earl of Dorset.

In 1604, Sackville bought Groombridge Place in Kent. His other houses included Knole House, in Sevenoaks, Kent, Michelham Priory, in East Sussex, and Dorset House, near Fleet Street, London, later burnt down in the Great Fire of London. Queen Elizabeth acquired the manor of Bexhill in 1570 and granted it to Sackville. He was also the last Sackville to be lord of the manor of Bergholt Sackville (named after the Sackville family) and Mount Bures in Essex, which he sold in 1578 to one Alice Dister. Both properties had been in the Sackville family for 459 years. In August 1605 Dorset recommended "Mr Thorpe" to survey and make "plots" for the rebuilding of Ampthill for Anne of Denmark and Prince Henry.

In April 1607 he wrote to George More of Loseley asking him to influence the Countess of Cumberland to arrange the marriage of her daughter Lady Anne Clifford to his grandson Richard Sackville. In June 1607, when Sackville was ill, James Hay of the king's bedchamber, visited him and brought the king's gift of a ring with set with diamonds and the message that he hoped Sackville would wear the ring and "live as long as the diamonds of that ring ... did endure". He recovered from the bout of illness and wrote his will in August, but died on 19 April 1608.

=== Literary and commercial ===
In addition to his political career, Sackville is remembered for his literary contributions. With Thomas Norton, he was an author in 1561 of the first English play to be written in blank verse, Gorboduc, which deals with the consequences of political rivalry. It was performed as part of the Christmas festivities (1560–1561) by the society of the Inner Temple, and afterwards on 18 January 1561 before Elizabeth at Whitehall.

He also contributed to the 1563 edition of The Mirror for Magistrates, with the poem Complaint of Henry, Duke of Buckingham. Sackville's first important literary work was the poem Induction, which describes the poet's journey to the infernal regions, where he encounters figures representing forms of suffering and terror. The poem is noted for the power of its allegory and for its sombre stateliness of tone.

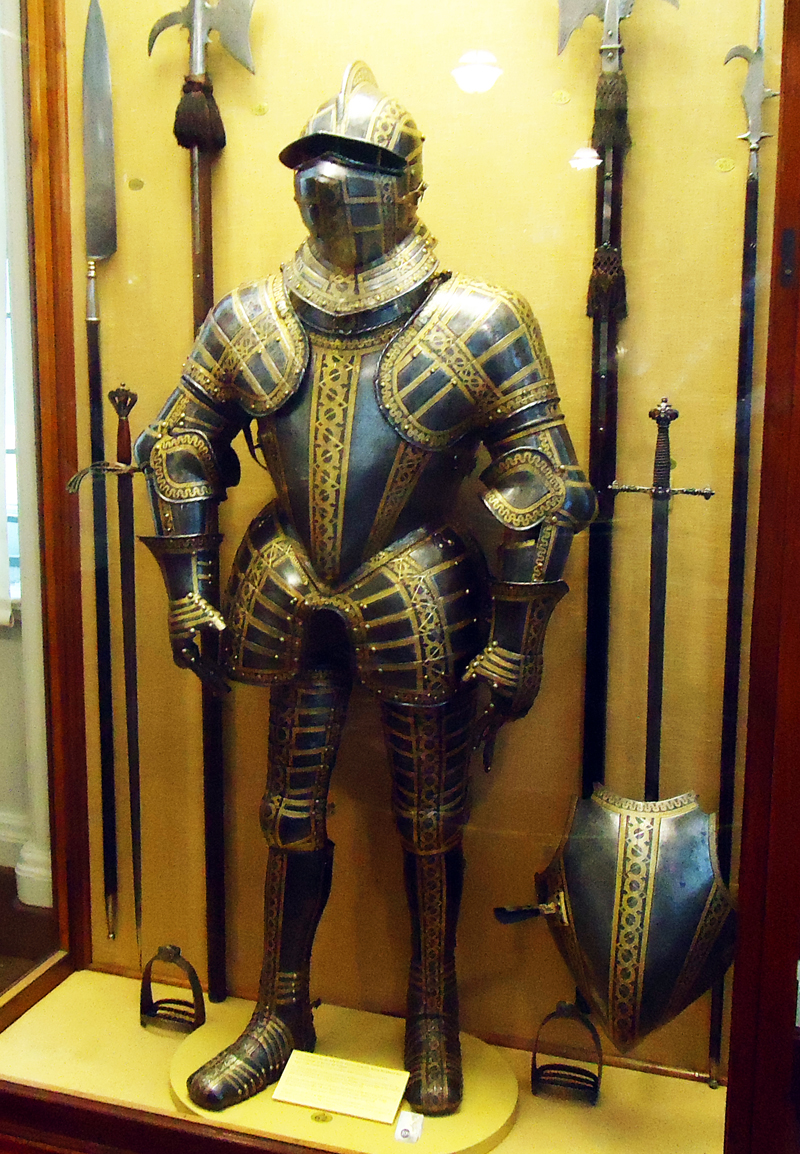
The armour of Thomas Sackville, made in the Greenwich Royal Workshops.

Sackville acquired a large fortune through his land dealings in many counties, as well as from his investments in the iron foundry business. He was an advocate of stronger enforcement of the sumptuary laws, which regulated the types of clothing allowed to be worn by the various social classes, within the military. Specifically, he dictated that only soldiers holding the rank of colonel or above should be permitted to wear silk and velvet, and that captains and all ranks below should "make do with fustian and spend the remaining money on their arms."

In around 1587, Sackville was granted a royal licence to commission a suit of armour from the royal workshops at Greenwich. The finely etched, blued and gilt armour, a garniture for the field, is one of the finest and best-preserved examples of the Greenwich school of armour-making. It is now part of the Wallace Collection in London. Another, similar, suit of armour, featuring the same construction and decorative scheme, which belonged to Sir James Scudamore, can be seen at the Metropolitan Museum of Art in New York.

He died suddenly at the council table, having apparently suffered a stroke, referred to as "a dropsy on the brain". His funeral took place at Westminster Abbey, and he is buried in the Sackville family vault at Withyham Parish Church, East Sussex.

== Family ==
In 1555, Sackville married Cicely Baker, daughter of the leading politician Sir John Baker and his second wife Elizabeth Dineley. They had seven children, including his heir Robert, and Sir William Sackville, knighted by Henry IV of France.

A daughter Anne married Sir Henry Glemham, and Mary married Lord Bergavenny. John Chamberlain recorded their reputation for learning in April 1606, as "complete women for learning, language, and all other rare qualities."

== Sources ==
- "Sackville, Thomas" . Dictionary of National Biography. London: Smith, Elder & Co. 1885–1900.
- Reginald W. Sackville West (editor) (1859), Works
- Zim, Rivkah (2007), "Religion and the Politic Counsellor: Thomas Sackville, 1536–1608", The English Historical Review, 122 (498): 892–917, doi:10.1093/ehr/cem256.

Political offices
Preceded by The Lord Lumley	Lord Lieutenant of Sussex jointly with The Viscount Montagu; The Lord De La Warr; 1570–1585	Succeeded by The Lord Howard of Effingham
Vacant Title last held by Richard Sackville	Custos Rotulorum of Sussex bef. 1573–1608	Succeeded by The Earl of Arundel
Preceded by The Lord Burghley	Lord High Treasurer; 1599–1608	Succeeded by The Earl of Salisbury
Academic offices
Preceded by Sir Christopher Hatton	Chancellor of the University of Oxford; 1591–1608	Succeeded by Richard Bancroft
Peerage of England
New creation	Earl of Dorset; 1604–1608	Succeeded by Robert Sackville
New creation	Baron Buckhurst; 1567–1608	Succeeded by Robert Sackville
