= Warren baronets =

Set index for Warren baronets

There have been two baronetcies created for persons with the surname Warren, one in the Baronetage of Great Britain and one in the Baronetage of Ireland. As of 2026 one creation is extinct while the other is dormant.

- Warren baronets of Little Marlow (1775): see John Borlase Warren (1753–1822)
- Warren baronets of Warren's Court (1784)
