= List of successful votes of no confidence in British governments =

This is a list of successful votes of no confidence in British governments led by prime ministers of the former Kingdom of Great Britain and the current United Kingdom. The first motion of no confidence to defeat a ministry was in 1742 against the Whig government of Robert Walpole, who is generally regarded as the de facto first prime minister. Since then, there have been 24 successful votes of confidence motioned against British governments. The most recent was held against the Labour government of James Callaghan in March 1979, after which Callaghan was forced to hold a general election by May and was defeated by Margaret Thatcher's Conservative Party.

Prior to the vote in 1979, the last successful vote of no confidence in a British government occurred in 1924, marking the lengthiest interval between such occurrences in British parliamentary history.

== Defeat of the Walpole ministry (1742) ==
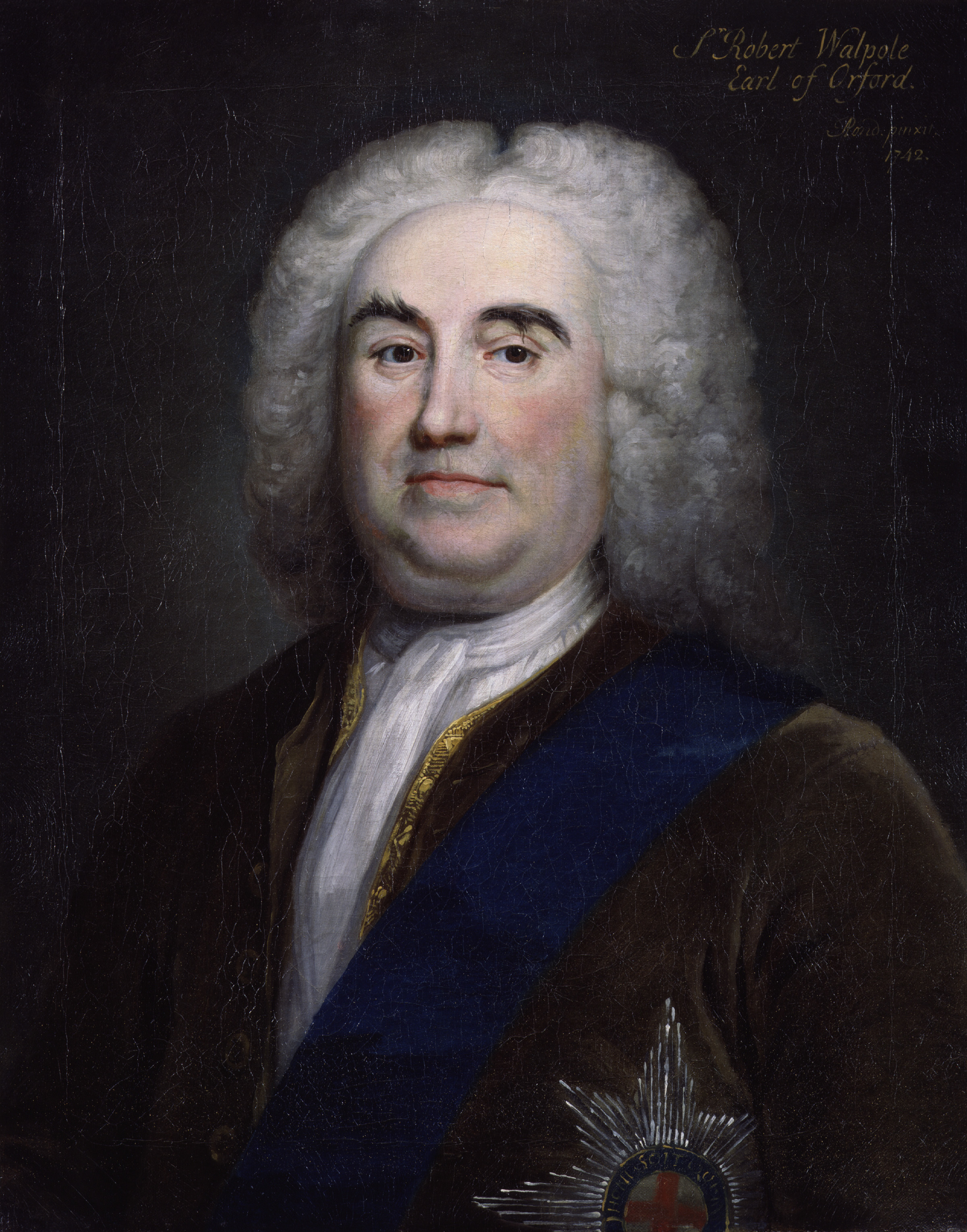
Robert Walpole

The 1742 vote of no confidence in the government of Robert Walpole was the first time that a prime minister of Great Britain resigned after a vote of no confidence by the House of Commons. Walpole is regarded as the first British prime minister, although this was not an official position until the early twentieth century. He had been continually in office since April 1721 and relied for the continuance of his government on the confidence of the King as well as that of Parliament.

As early as 1739, Walpole told the House of Commons that the ministry should be accountable to the Parliament. During the following years, the support for the government in the House of Commons decreased gradually. In January 1742, the government introduced in a petition against the return of two members of parliament for Chippenham in recently held by-elections. The petition was defeated in the House of Commons by a vote of 235 to 236 on 28 January.

Division
Ayes	235
Noes	236

Walpole saw this defeat as the loss of Parliament's confidence in his ministry. As a result, he submitted his resignation as First Lord of the Treasury and Chancellor of the Exchequer on 11 February and was replaced by Lord Wilmington. Walpole had been created Earl of Orford by King George II on 6 February and left the House of Commons. However, the principle of cabinet collective responsibility had not been established and the other members of the Walpole ministry remained in office.

== Defeat of the North ministry (1782) ==
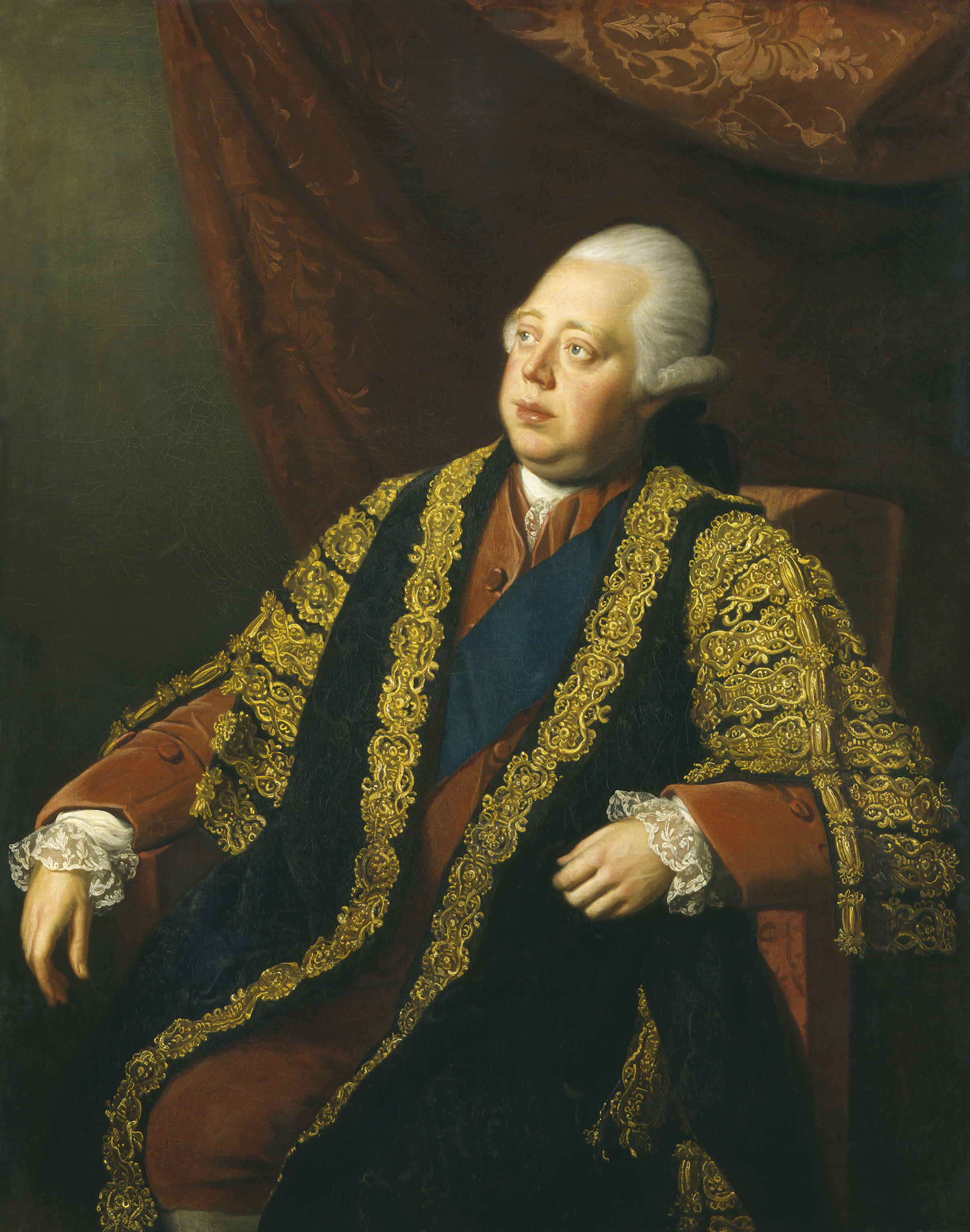
Frederick North, Lord North

The 1782 vote of no confidence in the government of Lord North was the first time that a British Cabinet was forced to resign after a vote of no confidence in the House of Commons. Frederick North, Lord North became Prime Minister in January 1770. After the defeat of the British troops in the Siege of Yorktown, Henry Seymour Conway, a Whig MP, introduced into Parliament a motion to end "the further prosecution of offensive warfare" in America. The motion was passed in the House of Commons by a vote of 234 to 215 on 27 February. The vote symbolised the loss of King George III's support in Parliament for the war, as well as the loss of Parliament's confidence in the North government. Feeling unable to hold his office any longer, North submitted his resignation on 22 March and his Cabinet resigned with him. This was the first time that the Cabinet took collective responsibility and resigned after the loss of support in the Parliament. The King then asked Lord Rockingham to form a government.

Division
Ayes	234
Noes	215

== Defeat of the Pitt ministry (1784) ==
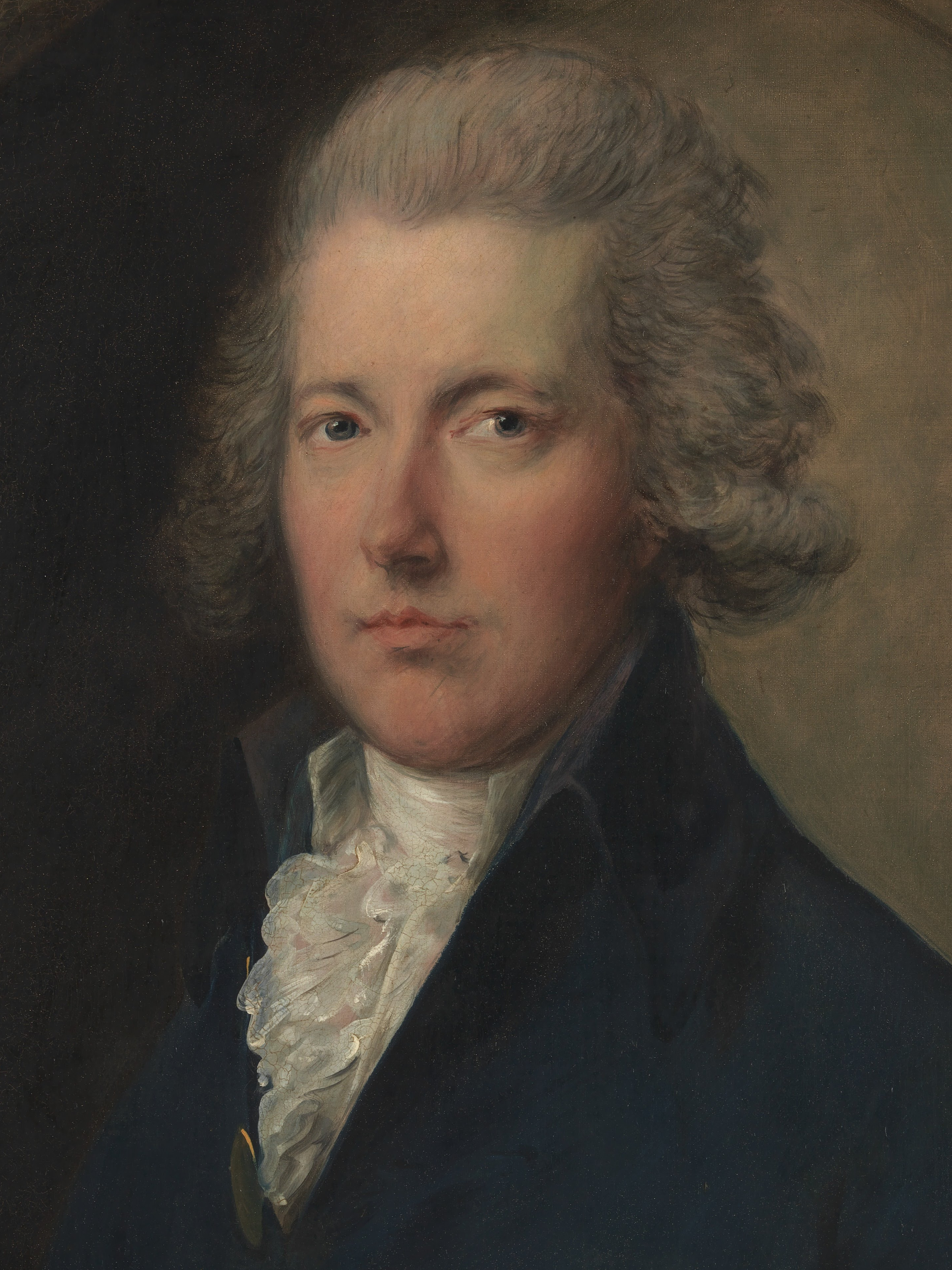
William Pitt the Younger

The 1784 vote of no confidence in the government of William Pitt the Younger occurred in February 1784.

William Pitt the Younger became Prime Minister in December 1783. He enjoyed the support of King George III but was opposed and attacked by Charles James Fox and the Whigs in Parliament. On 2 February, Thomas Coke, a Whig MP, proposed in the House of Commons a motion that the "continuance of the ministers in office" is an obstacle to an "efficient, united and extended administration" of the country. The motion was carried by a vote of 223 to 204.

Division
Ayes	223
Noes	204

Pitt, however, refused to follow the precedent to resign. He retained the support of the King and received the support of the House of Lords. Longing to force the government to resign, Fox proposed a motion for an address for the removal of ministers on 1 March which was passed by a vote of 201 to 189, and a further and more strongly worded motion on 8 March which was passed by 191 to 190. Fox thereafter declined to push motions, as his base continued to crumble. Despite these series of defeats in the House of Commons, Pitt resolutely remained in office, watching the Opposition's majority shrink.

Pitt, meanwhile, decided to go to the country and advised the King to dissolve the Parliament, which the King did on 25 March. The ensuing election left Pitt's government a safe majority in the House of Commons. This was the first time that a prime minister avoided resignation by asking for a dissolution of Parliament and created an important precedent for future political practices.

== Defeat of the Wellington–Peel ministry (1830) ==
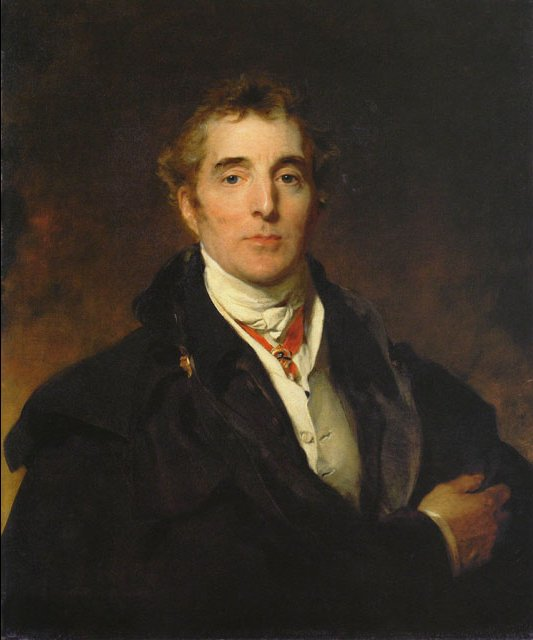
Arthur Wellesley, 1st Duke of Wellington by Thomas Lawrence

The 1830 vote of no confidence in the government of the Duke of Wellington occurred in November 1830 when a government motion over a financial question was defeated in the House of Commons.

Arthur Wellesley, 1st Duke of Wellington became Prime Minister of the United Kingdom in January 1828. By late 1830, the support for his government in Parliament was crumbling: the government's policy of Catholic emancipation (via the Roman Catholic Relief Act 1829) split the Tory Party, and the political and popular pressure for parliamentary reform grew rapidly against the government's will.

On 15 November 1830, Chancellor of the Exchequer Henry Goulburn proposed a motion in the House of Commons that the House go into a committee to consider the Civil List for 1831. Sir Henry Parnell, Bt, a Whig MP, proposed conversely an inquiry into the details of the Civil List before it went into the committee. The original motion of the Chancellor was then vetoed by a vote of 204 to 233 in the House. Surprised by the unexpected defeat, Wellington submitted his resignation on the next day. King William IV invited Whig leader Lord Grey to form a government which was to propose the Great Reform Act 1832.

Division
Ayes	204
Noes	233

== First defeat of the Peel ministry (1835) ==
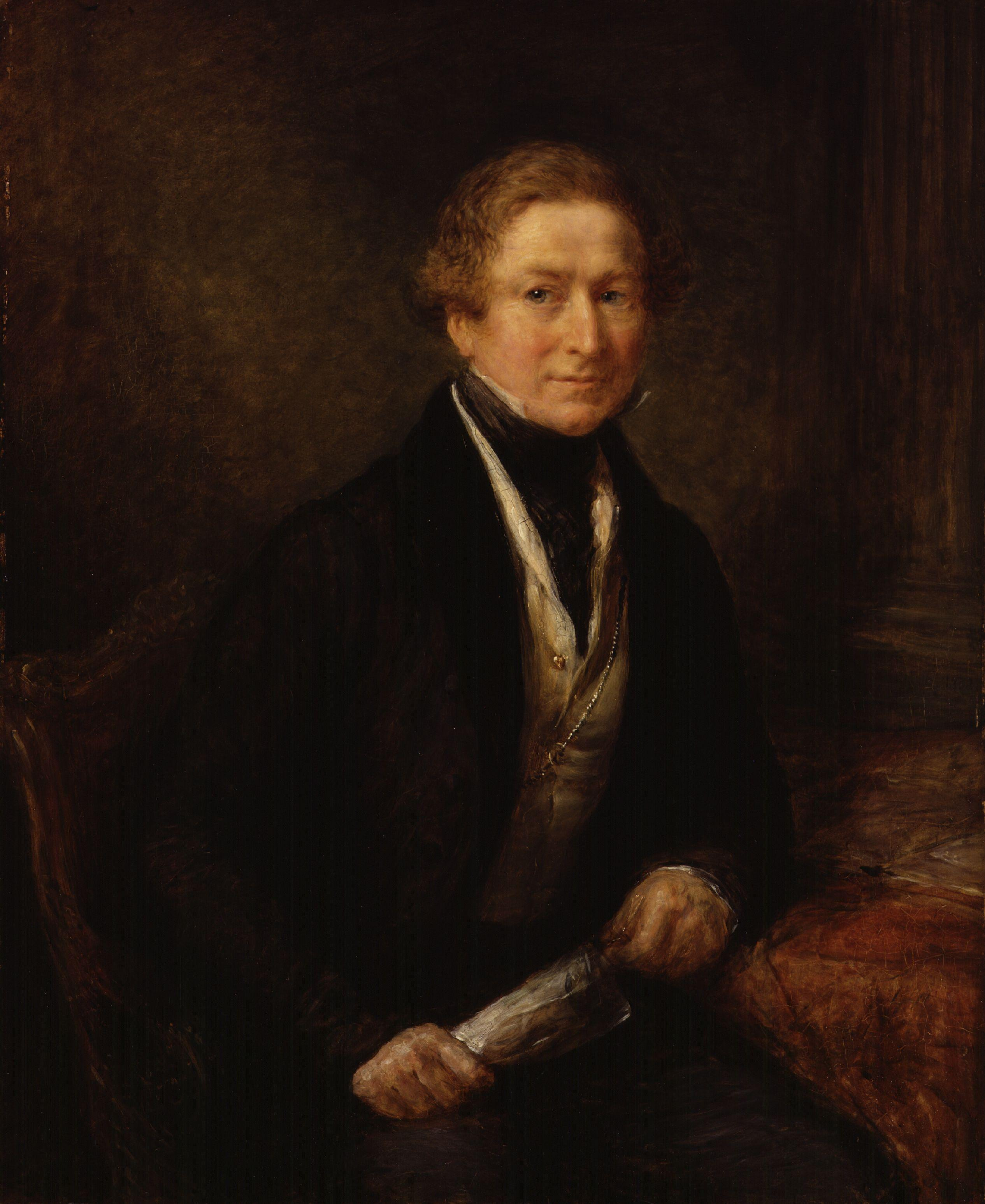
Portrait of Sir Robert Peel by John Linnell

The 1835 vote of no confidence in the government of Robert Peel occurred in April 1835 when the Commons passed a report against the government's will.

Robert Peel became Prime Minister in December 1834. However, his party formed only a minority in the House of Commons. The following general election did not change this situation, which left the Conservative Party over 100 seats shorter than the Whigs in the House of Commons. Peel's government was unable to implement most of its policies. On 7 April, Ralph Bernal, a Whig MP, brought up a Report of the Committee of the House on the Church of Ireland. The Report was passed in the House of Commons against the government's will by a vote of 285 to 258. Peel resigned on the next day and King William IV invited Whig leader Lord Melbourne to become Prime Minister and form a government.

Division
Ayes	285
Noes	258

== First defeat of the Melbourne ministry (1841) ==
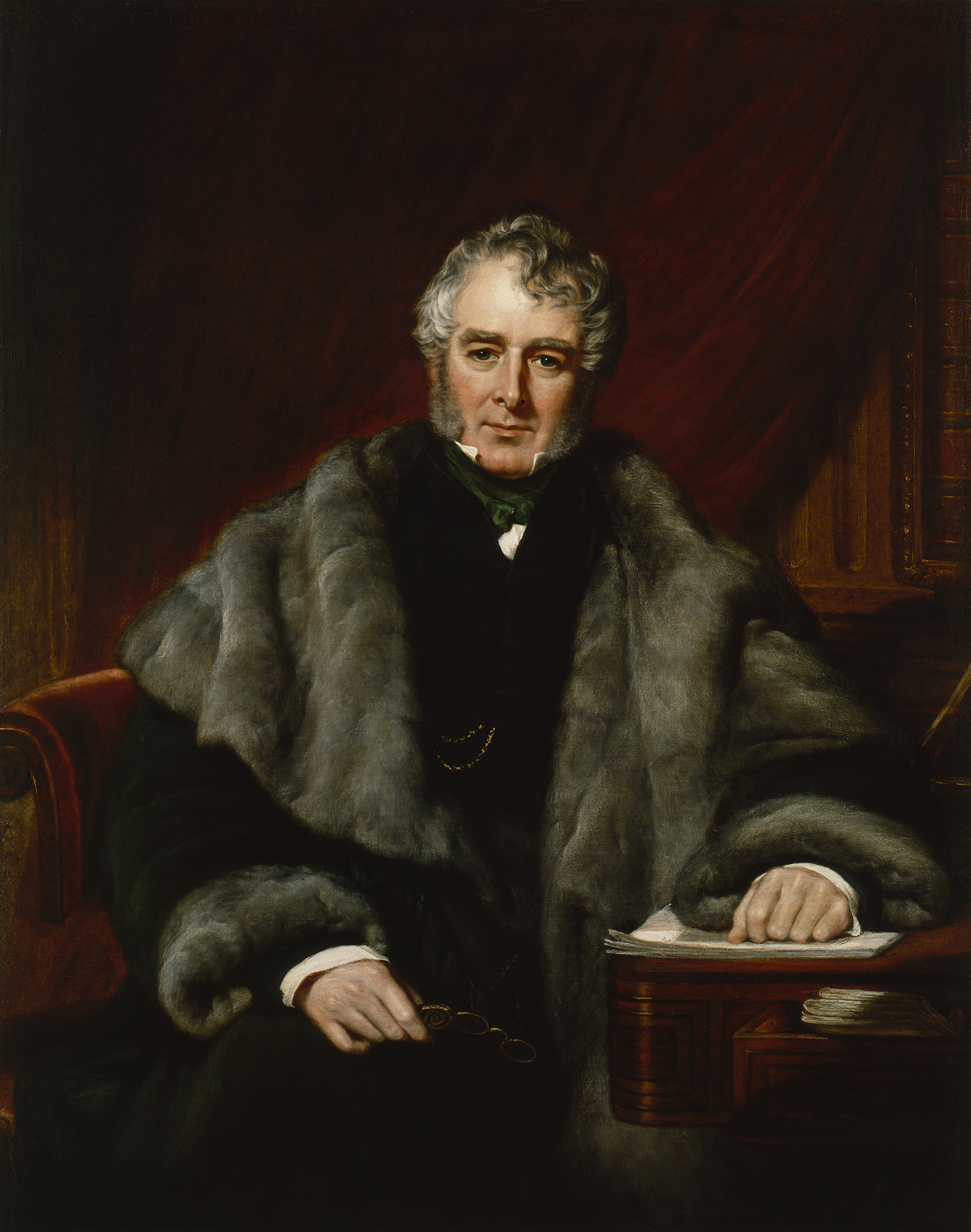
Portrait of Lord Melbourne by John Partridge

The first vote of no confidence in the government of Lord Melbourne occurred in June 1841.

William Lamb, 2nd Viscount Melbourne became Prime Minister in April 1835. On 27 May 1841, Robert Peel, leader of the Conservative Party, introduced in the House of Commons a motion of no confidence against the Melbourne government. After five days of debate, the motion was carried in the House by a vote of 312 to 311 on 4 June. Melbourne then asked Queen Victoria to dissolve Parliament, which she did on 23 June. The Whig Party lost 70-odd seats in the following general election, and the government was defeated in a further vote of no confidence on 27 August.

Division
Ayes	312
Noes	311

== Second defeat of the Melbourne ministry (1841) ==
The second vote of no confidence in the government of Lord Melbourne occurred in August 1841.

Queen Victoria had opened the new Parliament on 24 August. On the same day, Conservative MP John Stuart-Wortley proposed in the House of Commons an amendment to the House's address in answer to the Queen's Speech, which claimed that the government no longer possessed the confidence of Parliament. Lord Ripon, a former prime minister, proposed the same amendment in the House of Lords. After four days of debate, the House of Commons voted on 27 August on the question whether the proposed amendment should be left out of the address. The question was vetoed by a vote of 269 to 360 and Wortley's amendment was added to the address. This was the second time for a Melbourne government to lose a vote of confidence in the same year. He resigned on 30 August, and the Queen invited Conservative leader Robert Peel to become Prime Minister and form a government.

Division
Ayes	269
Noes	360

== Second defeat of the Peel ministry (1846) ==
The 1846 vote of no confidence in the government of Robert Peel occurred in June 1846 when the House of Commons defeated a government bill.

Robert Peel became Prime Minister of the United Kingdom for a second time in August 1841. In order to relieve the suffering caused by the Great Famine in Ireland, he decided in 1845 to repeal the Corn Laws which were passed in 1815 to protect British agricultural production by restrictions on grain imports. This policy caused a split in the Conservative Party between the free-traders led by Peel and the protectionists led by Lord Derby, Lord George Bentinck and Benjamin Disraeli. On 15 May 1846, Peel's Bill of Repeal (officially titled Corn Importation Bill) was passed in the House of Commons with the support of the Whigs and the Radicals.

The Protection of Life (Ireland) Bill (or "Coercion Bill") was introduced by the government in March 1846 to deal with the turbulences on the island, and was regarded by Peel's opponents as an opportunity to oust him. On 25 June, the same day when the Bill of Repeal was passed in the House of Lords, the Coercion Bill was defeated in the House of Commons on its second reading by a combination of Conservative protectionists, Whigs and Radicals. The vote was 219 to 292.

Division
Ayes	219
Noes	292

Peel's government resigned on 27 June, and Lord John Russell formed a Whig government. Lord Stanley became the Leader of the Conservative Party. The Conservative free-traders, including Lord Aberdeen and William Gladstone, followed Peel to form a distinct faction called the "Peelites". They merged with the Whigs, the Radicals and the Independent Irish Party in 1859 to form the Liberal Party.

== First defeat of the Russell ministry (1851) ==
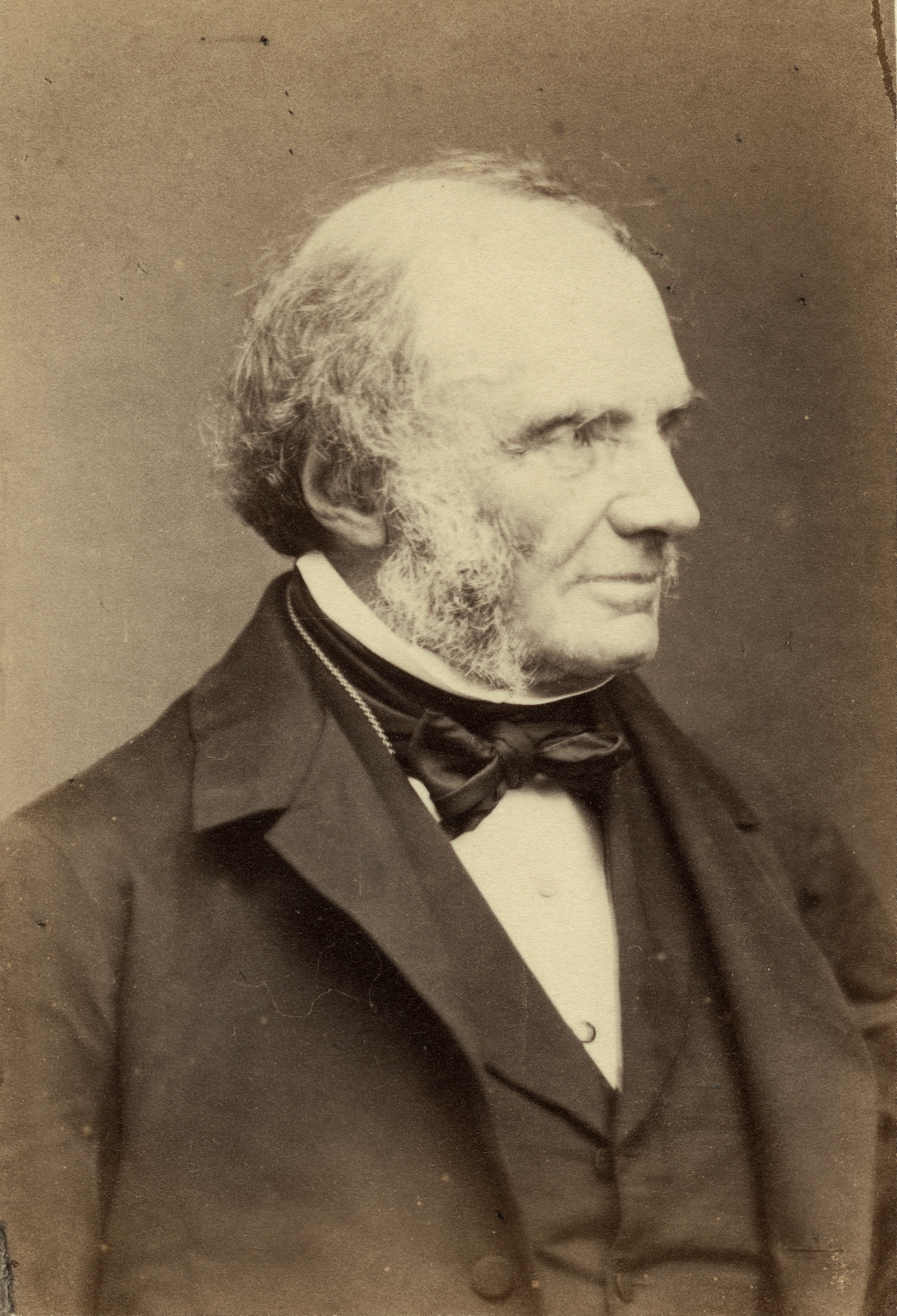
John Russell, 1st Earl Russell

The 1851 vote of no confidence in the government of Lord John Russell occurred in February 1851 when a motion of enfranchisement was carried in the House of Commons against the government's will. Lord John Russell became Prime Minister in June 1846. During Russell's premiership, the Whig Party only formed a minority in the House of Commons. The government relied on the implicit support of the Peelites led by Robert Peel, and its support in Parliament was weak.

On 20 February 1851, Whig MP Peter King brought a motion in the House of Commons to "make the franchise in counties in England and Wales the same as that in boroughs, by giving the right of voting to all occupiers of tenements of the annual value of £10." This would make the county franchise the same as the borough franchise set in Reform Act 1832. The government's view, however, was against further expansion of the electorate. Trying to avoid a defeat, Russell promised in the debate to bring in official measures of reform, but the bill was passed anyway on its first reading by a vote of 100 to 52 (but defeated on the second reading).

Division
Ayes	100
Noes	52

Russell regarded the defeat as a vote of no confidence and submitted his resignation on 22 February. However, neither the Conservatives nor the Peelites was able to form a government, and the ministry resumed office on 3 March. As a result, Russell committed himself to further Parliamentary reforms and brought in several Reform Bills from 1852 to 1866. These efforts would finally lead to the passage of Reform Act 1867.

== Second defeat of the Russell ministry (1852) ==
The 1852 vote of no confidence in the government of Lord John Russell occurred in February 1852 when the government was defeated on a bill in the House of Commons.

As the Whig Party only formed a minority in the House of Commons, the support for the government was weak. Russell's government had been defeated on a vote of no confidence in the previous year but resumed power shortly afterwards.

In December 1851, Foreign Secretary Lord Palmerston clashed with Russell and the Prince Consort over foreign policies. Forced to resign, Palmerston returned to the backbenches but was determined to bring down the Russell government. On 20 February 1852, Russell brought a Bill in the House of Commons to amend the Local Militia. Palmerston, however, spoke against the phrase "Local Militia" and proposed that the word "local" should be left out of the Bill's title. A debate between the government and its opponents followed over such trivial matters. The House then voted on the question that "the word 'local' stand part of the question", and the government was defeated by a vote of 125 to 136. Russell resigned on the next day and Queen Victoria asked Conservative leader Lord Derby to form a minority government.

Division
Ayes	125
Noes	136

== First defeat of the Derby–Disraeli ministry (1852) ==
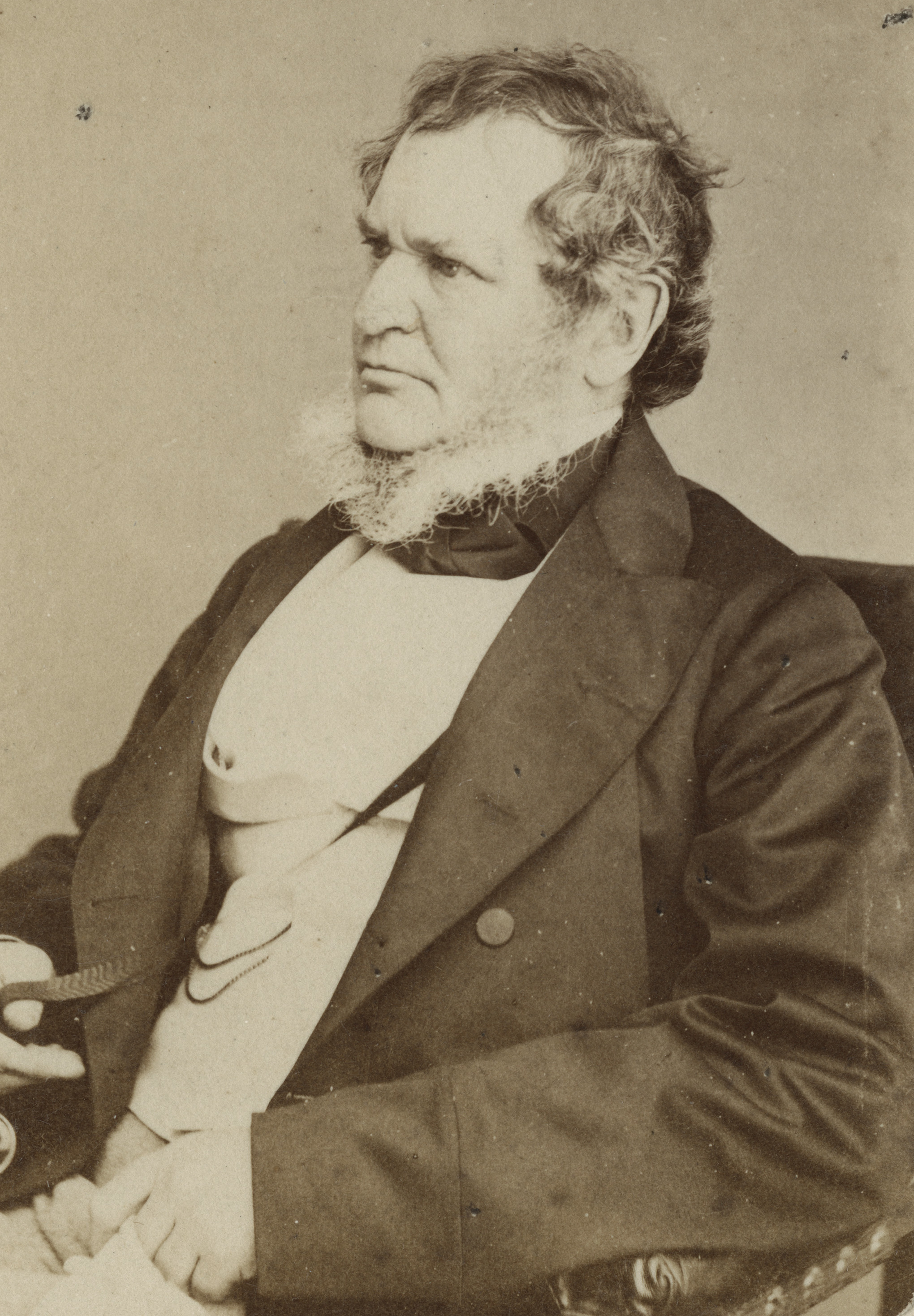
Edward Smith-Stanley, 14th Earl of Derby

The 1852 vote of no confidence in the government of Lord Derby occurred in December 1852 when the government's budget was rejected in the House of Commons.

Edward Smith-Stanley, 14th Earl of Derby had become Conservative Prime Minister in February 1852 when the Peelites held the balance of power in the House of Commons between the Whigs and the protectionist Conservatives and the previous Whig government had fallen. The general election in July did not strengthen the position of the government whose support in the House remained tenuous.

On 3 December 1852, Chancellor of the Exchequer Benjamin Disraeli proposed the budget for the financial year of 1853–54, in which he increased the house tax. It was fiercely attacked by the Whigs and the Peelites. On 16 December 1852, after four days of debates, the House voted on the Budget in committee, and the Budget was defeated by a vote of 286 to 305.

Division
Ayes	286
Noes	305

As a result, the government resigned on the next day. Under the leadership of Lord Aberdeen, the Whigs and the Peelites formed a coalition and the first majority government since 1846.

== Defeat of the Aberdeen ministry (1855) ==
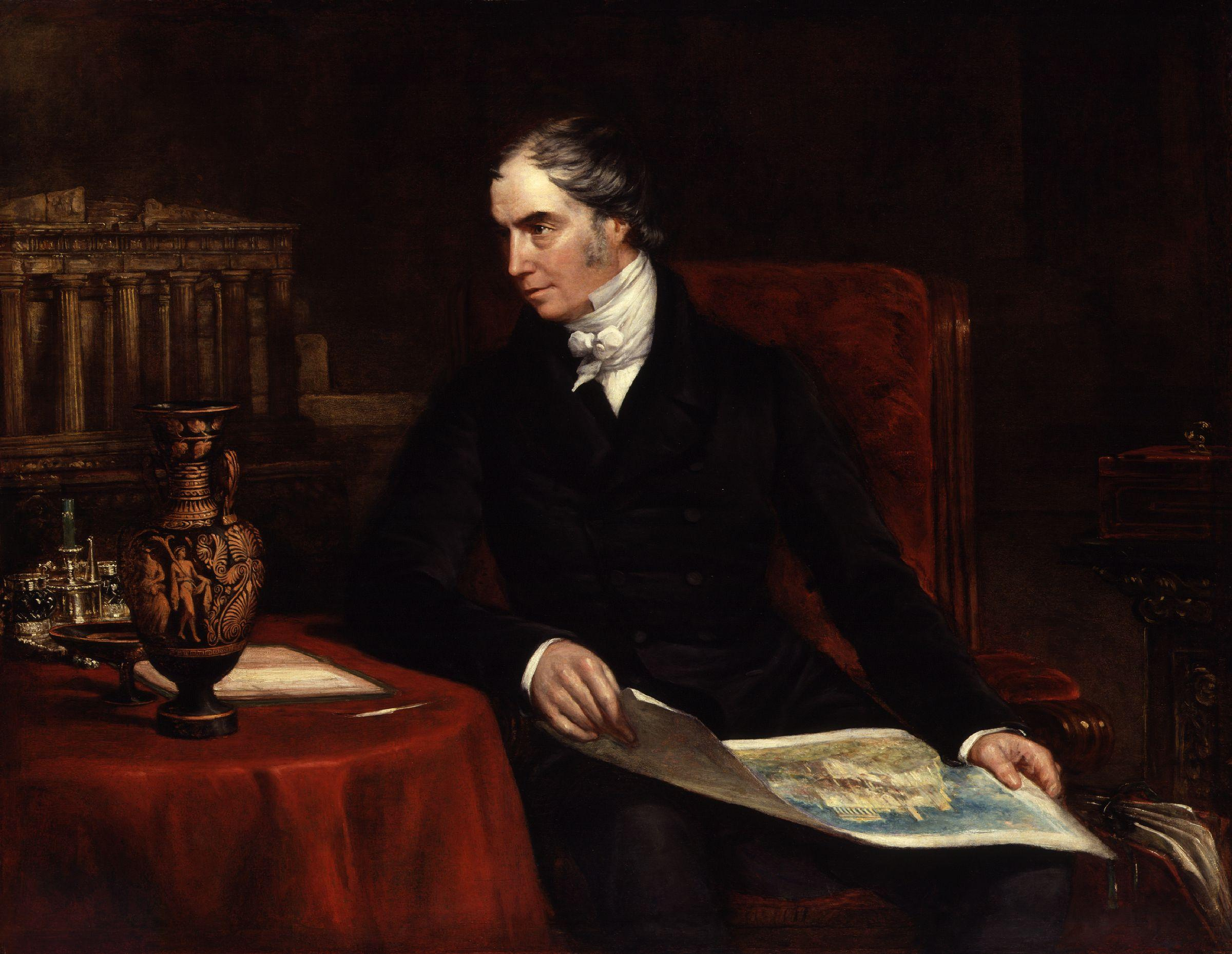
George Hamilton-Gordon, 4th Earl of Aberdeen

The 1855 vote of no confidence in the government of Lord Aberdeen occurred in January 1855 when the House of Commons voted in favour of an investigation of the alleged mismanagement during the Crimean War.

George Hamilton-Gordon, 4th Earl of Aberdeen became Prime Minister in December 1852 and formed a coalition government of Peelites and Whigs. In October 1853, the Crimean War broke out between the Ottoman Empire and Russia, and Britain and France declared war on the latter on 28 March 1854. The Allied Forces set a siege to Russian port Sevastopol in October. However, the British war effort was marked by gross mismanagement, and the death rates were very high. Public opinion turned hostile against the government.

On 26 January 1855, John Arthur Roebuck, a radical MP, proposed in the House of Commons to appoint a select committee to inquire into the condition of the British Army and into the government's conduct of war administration. After two days of debate, the motion was carried on 29 January in the House by a vote of 305 to 148.

Division
Ayes	305
Noes	148

Lord Aberdeen saw this huge defeat as a sign of no-confidence, and the government resigned on the next day. Lord Palmerston formed government on 6 February.

== First defeat of the Palmerston ministry (1857) ==
Henry John Temple, 3rd Viscount Palmerston

On 3 March 1857, the House of Commons expressed its dissatisfaction with the Government's explanation of the Arrow affair in Canton leading to the start of the Second Opium War

Division
Ayes	263
Noes	247

Palmerston had parliament dissolved, leading to the 1857 United Kingdom general election which he won with a convincing Whig majority.

== Second defeat of the Palmerston ministry (1858) ==
Following Felice Orsini's attempt, backed by English radicals, to assassinate Napoleon III in Paris, Palmerston introduced a Conspiracy to Murder Bill to increase the criminal penalties in England. On 19 February 1858 Disraeli exploited the government's embarrassment over its asylum and immigration policies, its opposition to the second French Empire, and some of its supporters' aid to serious criminal activity abroad, leading to defeat for the government on the second reading of the bill. Palmerston then resigned, leading to the short-lived second Derby–Disraeli ministry and then Palmerston's return in June 1859.

Division
Ayes	215
Noes	234

== Second defeat of the Derby–Disraeli ministry (1859) ==
The 1859 vote of no confidence in the government of Lord Derby occurred in June 1859.

Conservative seats increased in the 1859 general election, but the Opposition still held a majority in the House. On 6 June, leading Whigs, Peelites, Radicals and members of the Independent Irish Party met and agreed to officially establish the modern Liberal Party.

On 7 June, the new Parliament was opened by Queen Victoria. On the same day, in the debate in the House of Commons on the House's address in answer to the Queen's Speech, Whig MP Robert Culling Hanbury proposed an amendment to the address which claimed that the government no longer possessed the confidence of the Parliament. After three days of debate, the House voted on the amendment on 10 June and passed it by 323 to 310.

Division
Ayes	323
Noes	310

As a result, Derby resigned on 11 June, and Lord Palmerston was invited to form the first Liberal government.

== Third defeat of the Russell ministry (1866) ==
The 1866 vote of no confidence in the government of Lord Russell occurred when the government of John Russell, 1st Earl Russell was defeated on Parliamentary reform proposals on 18 June 1866.

Division
Ayes	315
Noes	304

== First defeat of the Gladstone ministry (1873) ==
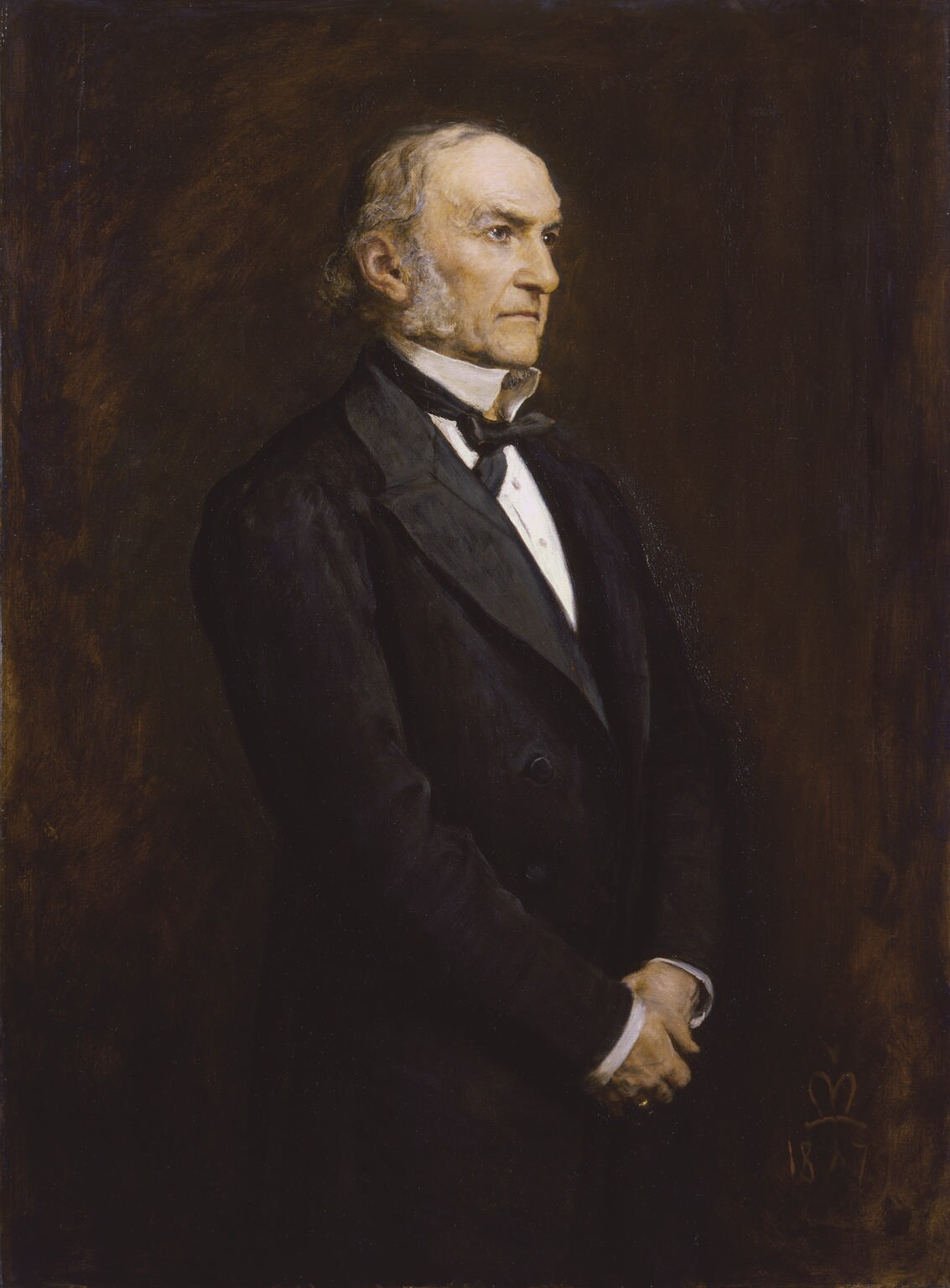
Portrait of William Ewart Gladstone by John Everett Millais, 1879

The 1873 vote of no confidence in the government of William Gladstone occurred in March 1873 when a government bill on university education in Ireland was vetoed in the House of Commons.

William Gladstone became Prime Minister in December 1868. His premiership was marked by series of political and social reforms. In February 1873, the government brought in University Education (Ireland) Bill, which proposed to make the Catholic University of Ireland, the Presbyterian Magee College and the colleges of the secular Queen's University of Ireland parts of the University of Dublin, and which abolished all religious requirements in these colleges as well as in the Trinity College.

On 3 March, Gladstone proposed in the House of Commons for the second reading of the Bill. After 4 days of debate, the House voted on the Bill on 11 March, and the government was defeated by a vote of 284 to 287.

Division
Ayes	284
Noes	287

Gladstone saw this close loss as a vote of no-confidence and submitted his resignation on 13 March. However, the Liberal Party held the majority in the House, and Benjamin Disraeli refused to form a minority Conservative government. Gladstone's cabinet therefore resumed on 19 March.

== Second defeat of the Gladstone ministry (1885) ==
The 1885 vote of no confidence in the government of Gladstone occurred on 8 June 1885 when his budget was defeated. Gladstone resigned from office on 9 June 1885.

Division
Ayes	252
Noes	264

== First defeat of the Salisbury ministry (1886) ==
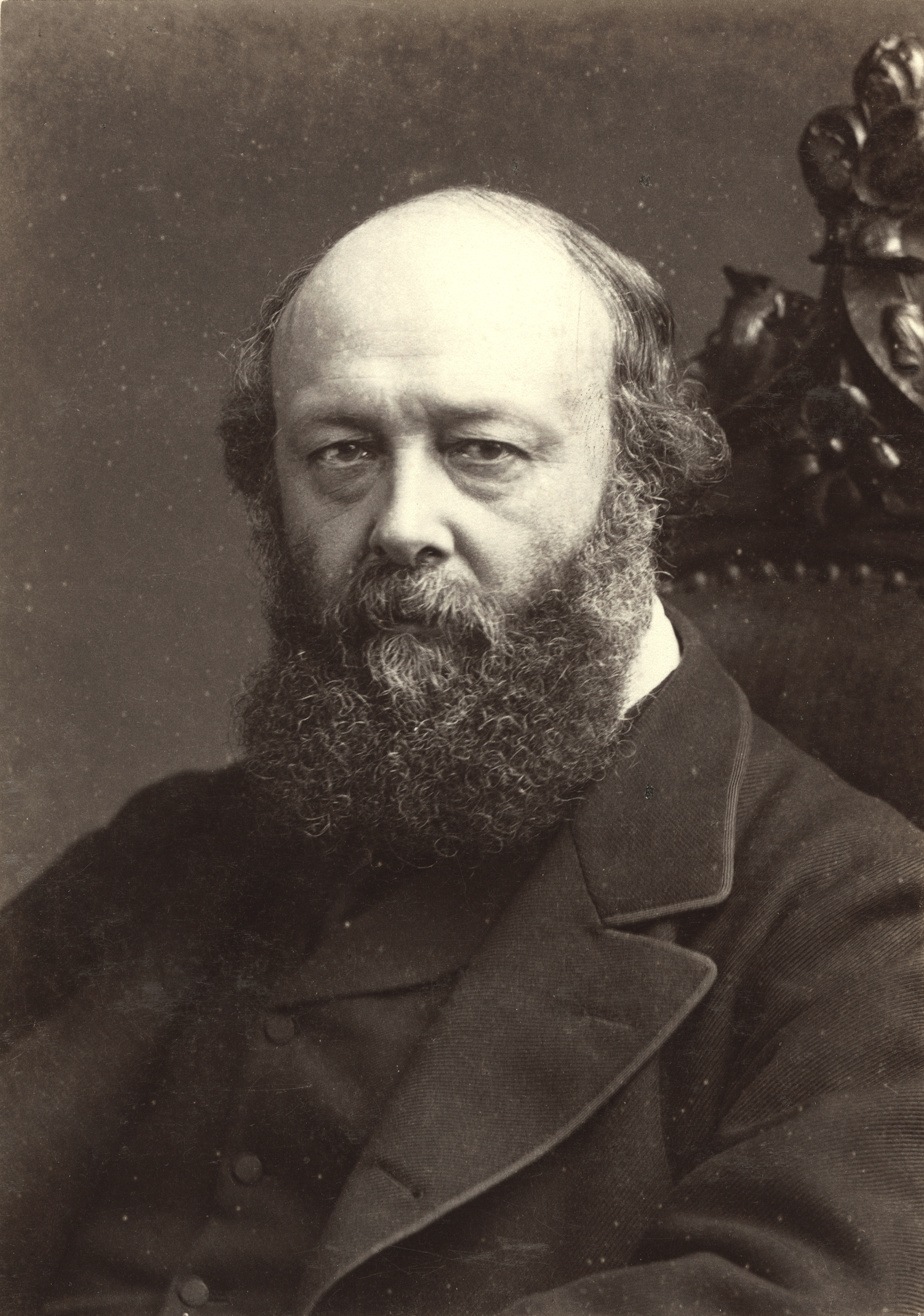
Robert Gascoyne-Cecil, 3rd Marquess of Salisbury

The 1886 vote of no confidence in the government of Lord Salisbury was a vote of no confidence in the Conservative government led by Salisbury, which was passed on the night of 26 January 1886.

The government had taken over in June 1885 after the Liberal government led by William Gladstone had resigned following a defeat on the budget. The government lacked a majority, but was not able to immediately dissolve as the changes to the franchise and constituency boundaries in the Reform Act had not yet become law.

In November, the necessary legal procedures were complete, and the government dissolved Parliament, precipitating a general election. Although the Conservatives were beaten, no party had a majority. The Conservatives had courted the Irish vote in 1885, and it was not plain the Irish Nationalists would back the Liberals. Salisbury did not resign and waited to meet Parliament. However, in the meantime the Hawarden Kite made it clear Gladstone would back Irish Home Rule.

Having waited to meet Parliament in the New Year, the Salisbury government brought in a Queen's Speech. On 26 January, Jesse Collings, Liberal MP for Ipswich moved an amendment "expressing regret that no measures were announced [in the Queen's Speech] for the present relief of those suffering under economic pressures, especially for affording facilities to the agricultural labourers and others in the rural districts to obtain allotments and small holdings on equitable terms as to rent and security of tenure." This was known as the "Three Acres and a Cow" amendment.

The amendment was carried by 329 votes to 250, and Salisbury subsequently resigned. Gladstone became Prime Minister again on 1 February.

Division
Ayes	329
Noes	250

== Third defeat of the Gladstone ministry (1886) ==
The 1886 vote of no confidence in the government of William Gladstone occurred when Parliament rejected the government's Ireland Bill. The Bill was treated as a confidence vote and Gladstone resigned immediately after.

Division
Ayes	311
Noes	341

== Second defeat of the Salisbury ministry (1892) ==
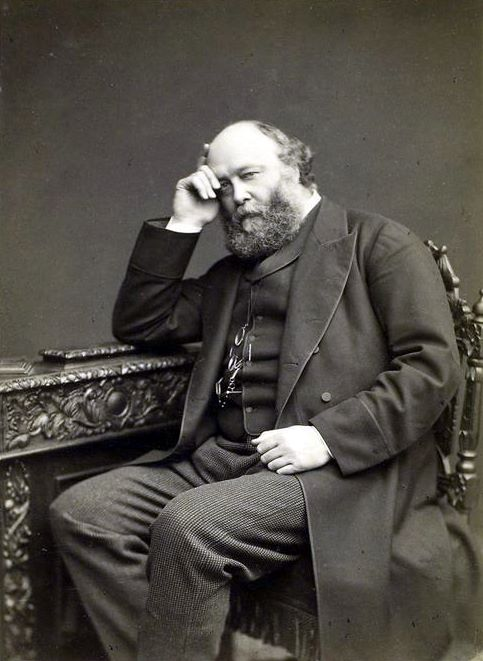
Marquess of Salisbury

The vote of no confidence in the second Salisbury ministry occurred when the Conservative government of Robert Cecil, the Marquess of Salisbury decided to meet Parliament after the general election despite not winning a majority. The government presented a Queen's Speech, but was defeated on 11 August 1892 when the House of Commons carried by 350 to 310 an amendment moved by the opposition Liberal Party declaring that Her Majesty's "present advisers" did not possess the confidence of the House. After the vote Salisbury resigned and Liberal Party leader William Ewart Gladstone became Prime Minister for the fourth time.

Division
Ayes	350
Noes	310

== Defeat of the Rosebery ministry (1895) ==
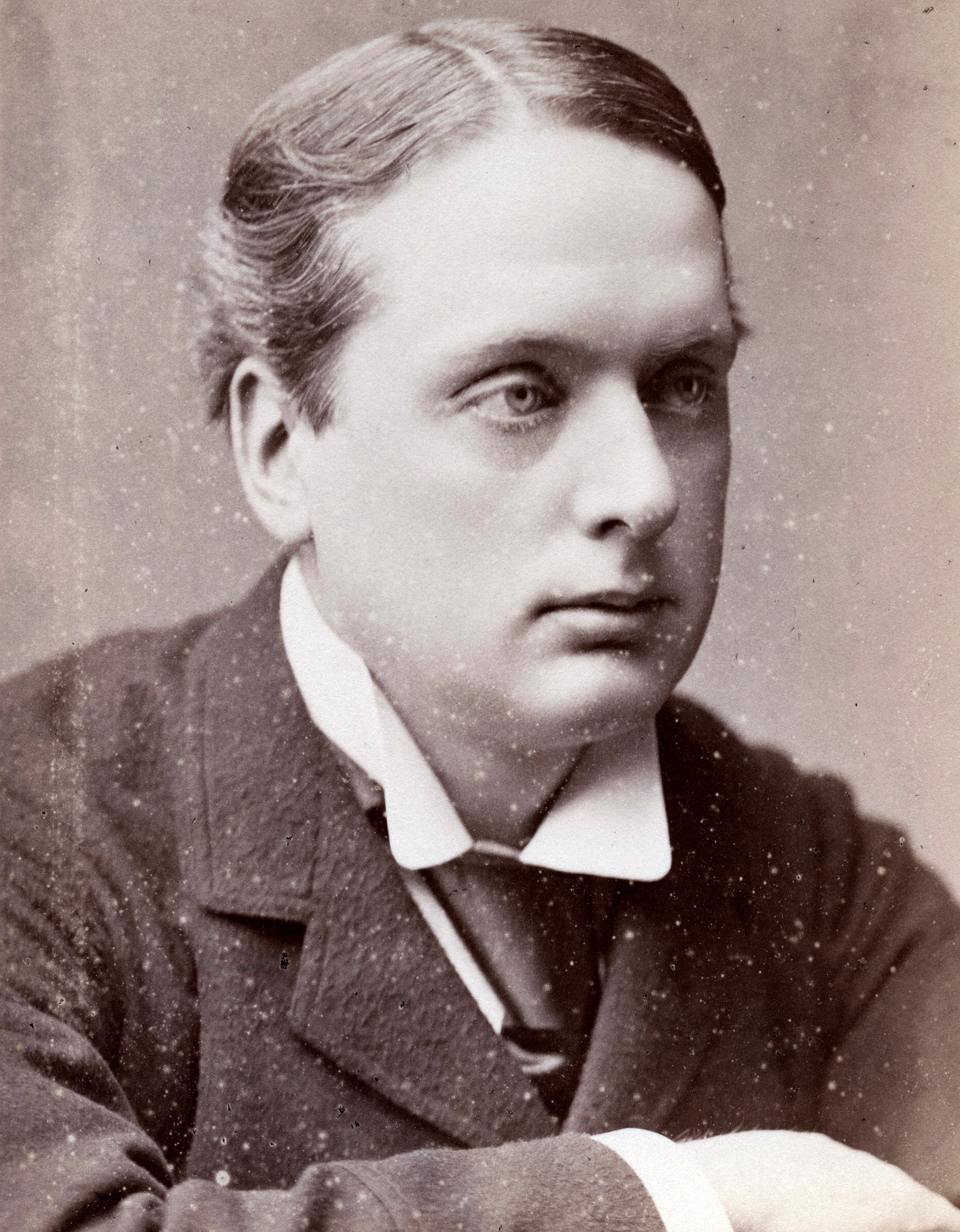
Lord Rosebery lost the vote of no confidence by seven votes.

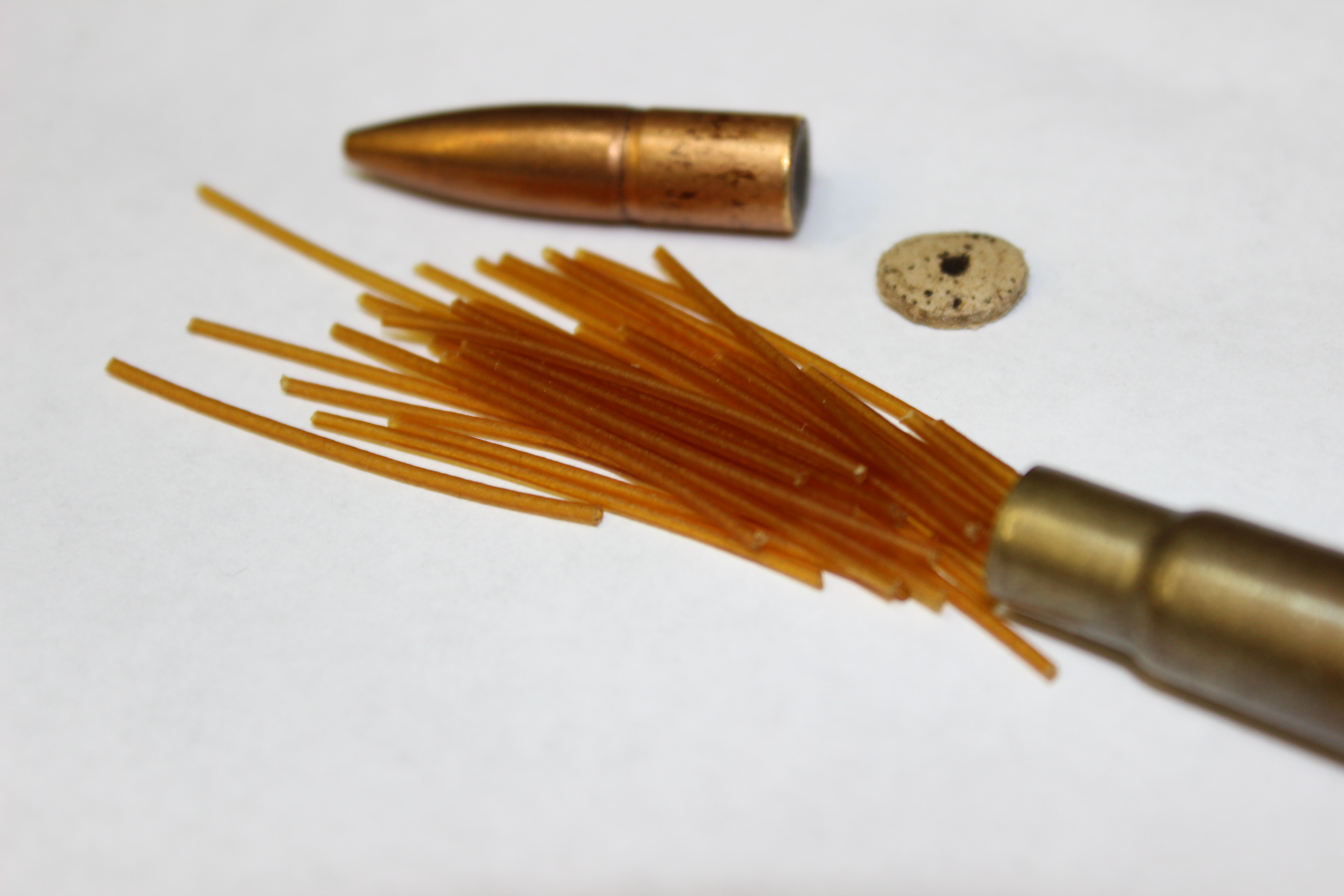
The deficient supply of Cordite (pictured) precipitated the vote.

The vote of no confidence in the Rosebery ministry of 21 June 1895, also known as the Cordite vote, was the occasion on which the Liberal Government of the Earl of Rosebery was defeated in a vote of censure by the House of Commons. The motion was to reduce the salary of the Secretary of State for War as a censure over deficient supply of cordite to the Army. When it was passed, the Secretary of State Henry Campbell-Bannerman offered his resignation. As Campbell-Bannerman was the most popular Minister in a Government which was suffering internal division and whose members had grown tired of office, the Government chose to interpret the issue as one involving confidence in the Government and therefore resigned. The incoming Conservative government soon sought a dissolution of Parliament and won the ensuing general election. The vote is the last time in the History of the British Parliament that a government has been defeated on a confidence motion when it had a workable majority.

Division
Ayes	132
Noes	125

== Defeat of the Baldwin ministry (1924) ==
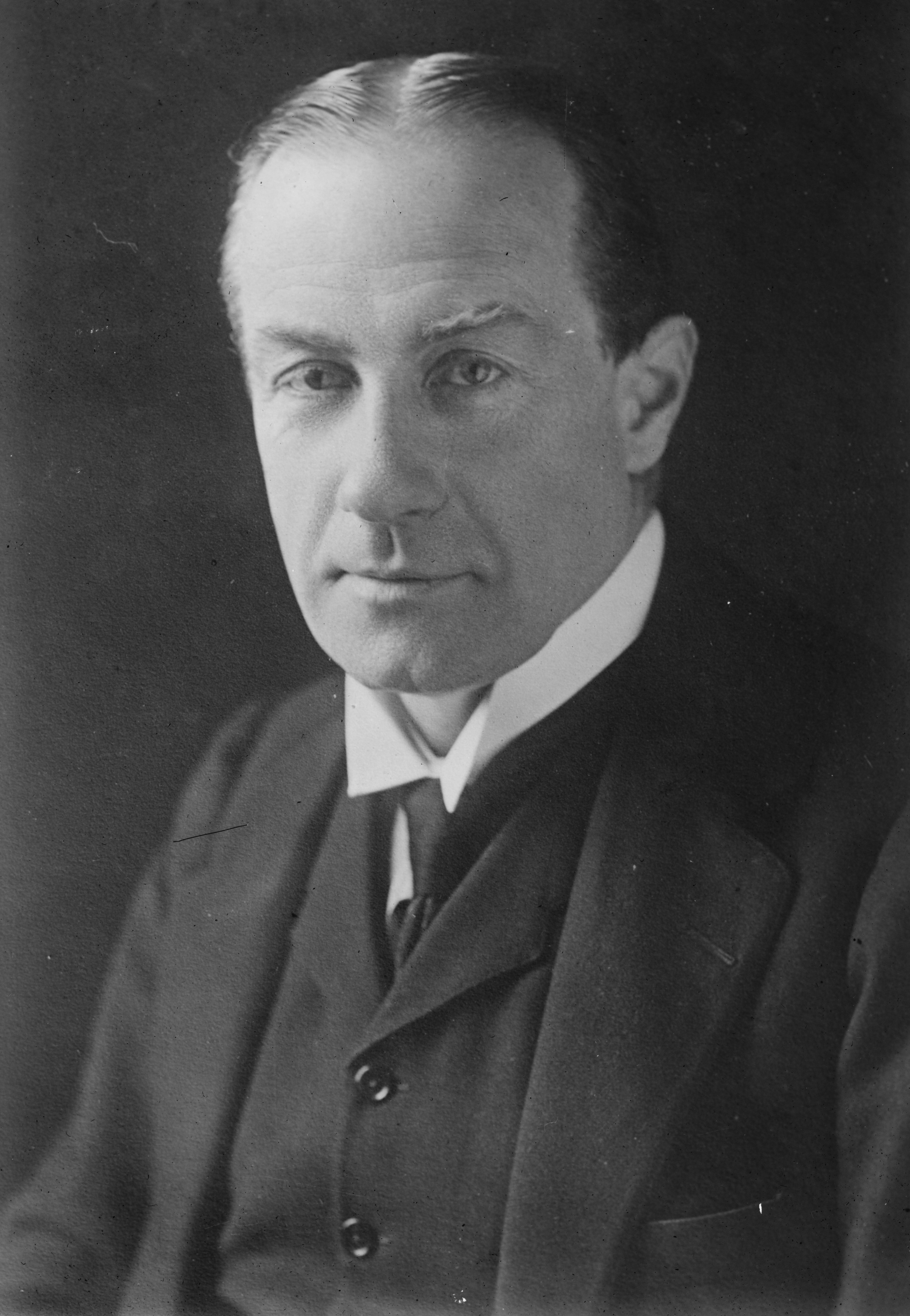
Stanley Baldwin

In January 1924 there was a vote of no confidence in the government of Stanley Baldwin. After the election in December 1923 returned a hung Parliament, the Conservatives remained the largest party but no longer had the overall majority needed to remain in government, allowing Labour and the Liberals to pass the vote. After Baldwin's resignation, Ramsay MacDonald formed a minority government and became the first Labour prime minister.

Division
Ayes	328
Noes	251

The motion moved by J. R. Clynes MP was:

"That an humble Address be presented to His Majesty, as followeth:—
Most Gracious Sovereign,
We, Your Majesty's most dutiful and loyal subjects, the Commons of the United Kingdom of Great Britain and Ireland, in Parliament assembled, beg leave to offer our humble thanks to Your Majesty for the Gracious Speech which Your Majesty has addressed to both Houses of Parliament.
But it is our duty respectfully to submit to your Majesty that Your Majesty's present advisers have not the confidence of this House."

== Defeat of the MacDonald ministry (1924) ==
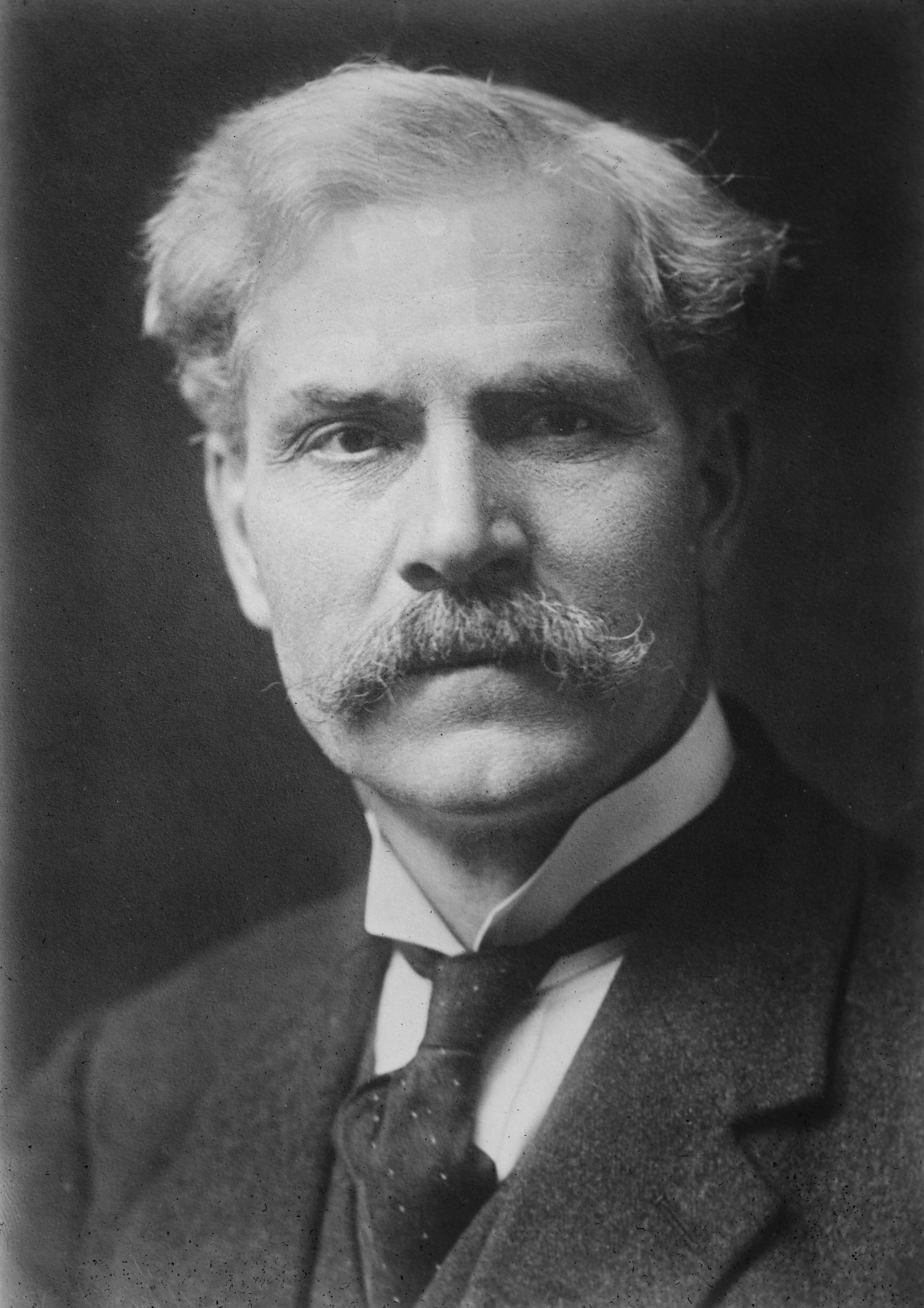
Ramsay MacDonald

The 1924 vote of no confidence in the government of Ramsay MacDonald was a vote of censure against the Labour government of Ramsay MacDonald as a consequence of the withdrawal of proceedings by His Majesty's Attorney General Patrick Hastings MP in the Campbell Case. It was one of only three votes of confidence lost by a government in the 20th century.

Division
Ayes	364
Noes	198

The actual motion of censure moved by Conservative Robert Horne MP "That the conduct of His Majesty's Government in relation to the institution and subsequent withdrawal of criminal proceedings against the editor of the 'Workers' Weekly' is deserving of the censure of this House" was rejected by 198 votes to 359 (a notional Government majority of 161), opposed by many Conservative MPs as the Conservative Party leadership had decided instead to vote for an alternative motion proposed by Liberal John Simon MP. Simon's motion, "That a Select Committee be appointed to investigate and report upon the circumstances leading up to the withdrawal of the proceedings recently instituted by the Director of Public Prosecutions against Mr. Campbell", was passed by 364 to 198. The government however, had made clear that they regarded both motions as votes of confidence and thus MacDonald requested and obtained a dissolution on the following day.

The consequence of the vote was the third general election in three years. Dominated by the publication of the controversial Zinoviev letter shortly before polling day and scares over Labour's attempts, as part of trade negotiations, to offer a loan to Bolshevik Russia, the Conservatives were returned to power with a majority of 208. They remained in office for the duration of the next Parliament. However, this spectacular success was predominantly at the expense of the Liberals, who lost 118 seats, rather than Labour. The latter lost only 40 seats and gained a million new votes compared to 1923. Thus the long-term consequence of the vote was to cement the supersession of the Liberals by Labour as the Official Opposition to Baldwin's Conservatives; the Liberals were reduced to the status of a minor party.

The Government's defeat on John Simon's motion (by a majority of 166) would prove the high water mark of government defeat in modern parliamentary politics until the first "Meaningful Vote" on the EU-UK Withdrawal Agreement. That vote was held on 15 January 2019, and the government lost by a majority of 230.

== Defeat of the Callaghan ministry (1979) ==
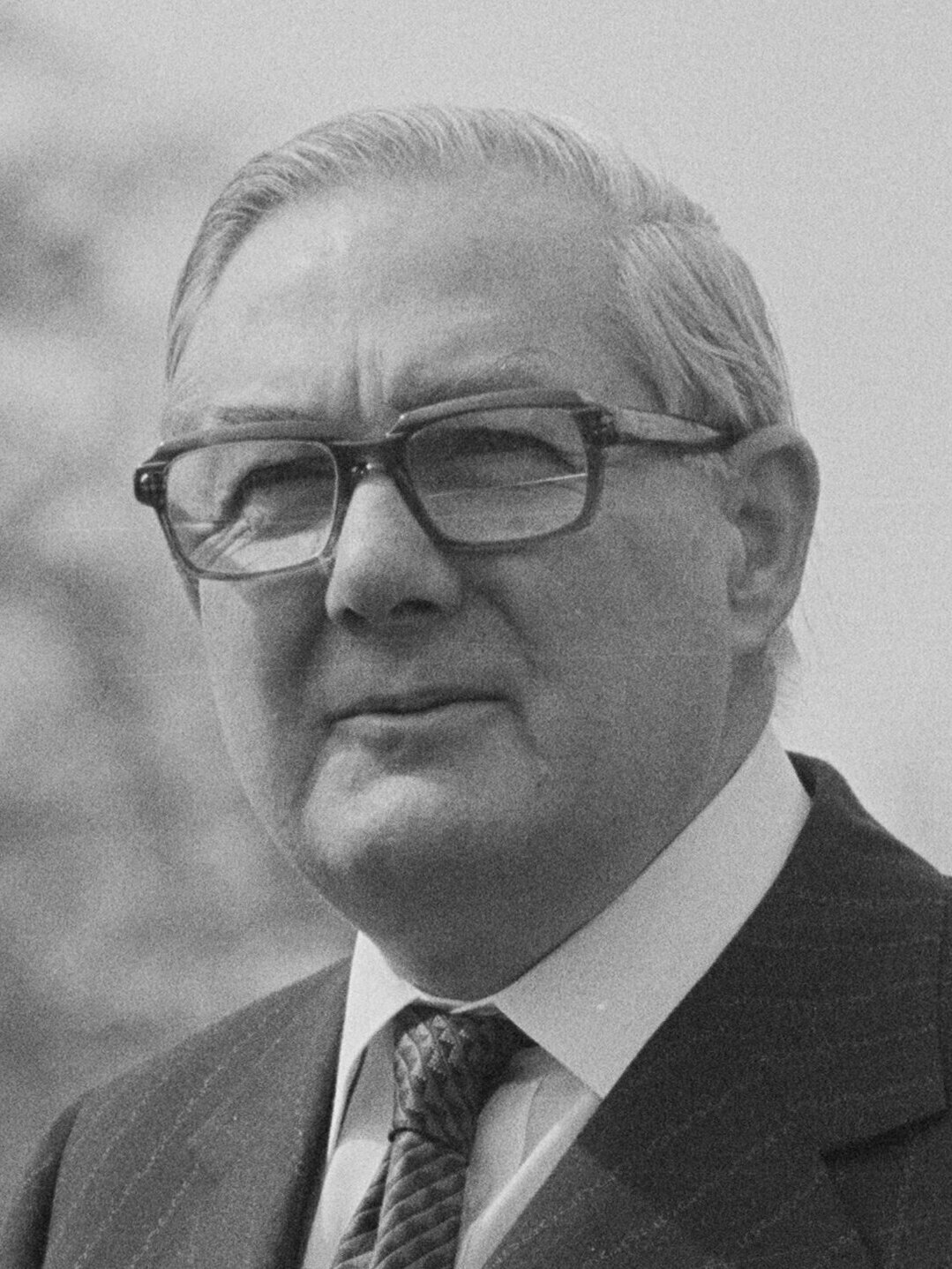
Prime Minister James Callaghan lost the vote of no confidence by just one vote.

A vote of no confidence in the British Labour government of James Callaghan occurred on 28 March 1979. The vote was brought by the Official Opposition leader Margaret Thatcher and was lost by the Labour government by one vote (311 votes to 310), which was announced at 10:19 pm. The result mandated a general election that was won by Thatcher's Conservative Party. The last time an election had been forced by the House of Commons was in 1924, when Ramsay MacDonald, the first Labour prime minister, lost a vote of confidence. Labour politician Roy Hattersley later remarked that the vote marked "the last rites" of Old Labour. Labour did not return to government until 1997, under Tony Blair's New Labour. The BBC has referred to the vote as "one of the most dramatic nights in Westminster history".

This is the most recent occasion on which a British government lost a vote of confidence.

Division
Ayes	311
Noes	310

== See also ==
- Confidence motions in the United Kingdom
- Norway Debate, in effect a motion of no confidence in the Chamberlain ministry
- 1993 vote of confidence in the Major ministry, an unsuccessful vote
- 2019 vote of confidence in the May ministry, an unsuccessful vote
- 2022 vote of confidence in the Johnson ministry, an unsuccessful vote
