= United Kingdom government crisis =

The United Kingdom government crisis may refer to:

== 18th century ==
- South Sea Bubble collapse of 1722
- 1727 Succession Crisis
- Excise Crisis of 1733
- Cider Bill of 1763
- Stamp Act 1765
- Corsican Crisis (1768)
- Falklands Crisis of 1770

== 19th century ==
- Succession crisis of 1812
- Peterloo Massacre (1819)
- Bedchamber crisis (1839–41)
- Don Pacifico affair (1850)
- Orsini affair (1858)
- Khartoum Crisis (1885)
- 1892 vote of no confidence in the Salisbury ministry
- 1895 vote of no confidence in the Rosebery ministry

== 20th century ==
- 1910 constitutional crisis
- Shell Crisis of 1915
- Gallipoli Crisis (1917–19)
- Conscription Crisis of 1918
- Chanak Crisis (1922)
- Abdication crisis of 1936
- Munich Crisis (1938)
- 1940 British war cabinet crisis
- Suez Crisis (1956)
- Night of the Long Knives (1962)
- 1976 sterling crisis
- 1979 vote of no confidence in the Callaghan ministry
- Westland affair (1985–86)
- Black Wednesday (1992)
- 1993 vote of confidence in the Major ministry

== 21st century ==
- Resignation of David Cameron (2016)
- 2018 British cabinet reshuffle
- Resignation of Theresa May (2019)
- July 2022 United Kingdom government crisis
- September 2022 United Kingdom mini-budget
- October 2022 United Kingdom government crisis
- 2026 Labour Party leadership crisis
