= Confidence motions in the United Kingdom =

Form of legislative motion

In the United Kingdom, confidence motions are a means of testing the support of the government (executive) in a legislative body, and for the legislature to remove the government from office. A confidence motion may take the form of either a vote of confidence, usually put forward by the government, or a vote of no confidence (or censure motion), usually proposed by the opposition. When such a motion is put to a vote in the legislature, if a vote of confidence is defeated, or a vote of no confidence is passed, then the incumbent government must resign, or call a general election.

It is a fundamental principle of the British constitution that the government must retain the confidence of the legislature, as it is not possible for a government to operate effectively without the support of the majority of the people's representatives. At the national level, this means that the UK government (the Cabinet) must retain the confidence of a majority in the House of Commons.

It is possible for a vote of no confidence to succeed where there is a minority government or a small majority, or where there are internal party splits leading to some members of the ruling party voting against its leaders. Where there is a minority government, the government may seek agreements or pacts with other parties in order to prevail in the vote and remain in office.

Despite their importance to the constitution, for a long time the rules surrounding motions of no confidence were dictated solely by convention. Under the Fixed-term Parliaments Act 2011, a vote of no confidence had to be passed in a specific form in order to create the possibility of an early general election. Under the Act, if the House of Commons passed a motion of no confidence in the government in express terms, the House must then adopt a vote of confidence in that same or an alternative government within 14 days, or a general election would be held. These practices were ended in 2022, with the repeal of the 2011 Act.

A no-confidence vote was last successfully used on 28 March 1979, when the minority government of James Callaghan was defeated. A no-confidence vote can have the effect of uniting the ruling party; for this reason such motions are rarely used and successful motions are even rarer. Before 1979 the last successful motion of no confidence occurred in 1924. The most recent confidence vote instigated by the opposition was held on 16 January 2019, with the government prevailing.

Defeat of a motion of no confidence (or winning a vote of confidence) does not provide protection to the government in power for any specific length of time. MPs from any political party may propose another vote immediately, although are unlikely to do so due to convention and potential weakening of their own standing.

== Forms ==
Since 1945 there have been three votes of confidence and 23 of no confidence.

Confidence motions fall into three categories:

- Explicit motions initiated by the Government
- Explicit motions initiated by the Opposition
- Motions which can be regarded as issues of confidence because of particular circumstances.

=== Government ===
A motion in this category is often effectively a threat of dissolution by the government, in order to persuade backbench MPs to support a bill. One such threat occurred in 1993 so that John Major could pass the Social Chapter of the Maastricht Treaty. In 2022, the outgoing government of Boris Johnson called a vote of confidence in itself after rejecting the wording of a proposed opposition motion that had signalled no confidence in both the government and Johnson's leadership specifically.

=== Opposition ===
Opposition motions are initiated by the opposition party and often have little chance of success. By convention, a no-confidence vote takes precedence over normal Parliamentary business for that day, and will begin with speeches from the Prime Minister and the Leader of the Opposition, rather than the ministers for the policy area which may be the concern of the motion. The motion may either profess no confidence in the Government itself, or no confidence in the particular policies of a government. Probably the most famous no-confidence motion was on the night of 28 March 1979 when Jim Callaghan's Labour Government fell from office by one vote, 311–310, in what was described by the BBC as one of the most dramatic nights in Westminster's history.

=== Particular circumstances ===
Although there is no commonly accepted and comprehensive definition of a confidence motion, it is possible to identify confidence motions from their timing, the speakers and the terms of the motion. Motions of confidence are supportive of the government, whereas motions of no confidence are unsupportive of the government. It can be difficult to distinguish an opposition no-confidence motion from other opposition motions critical of government policy. The term censure motion can also refer to a category of motion which does not attempt to remove the government.

== List of no-confidence votes ==
=== Successful votes before 1940 ===
Prime Minister in office	Party	Date	Subject of motion	Result Majority against the government	Consequences
Robert Walpole	Whig	28 January 1742	Ministerial petition against the return of 2 Members of Parliament for Chippenham	235–236 1	The Prime Minister resigned on 11 February 1742.
Frederick North, Lord North	Tory	27 February 1782	Motion to end offensive war in America	234–215 19	The Government resigned on 22 March 1782.
William Pitt the Younger	Tory	2 February 1784	Motion of no confidence	223–204 19	With the King's support, the Prime Minister refused to resign. Two more motions of no confidence were passed in the following weeks with smaller majorities. Once he was confident no further motions could be passed, the Prime Minister finally advised King George III to dissolve Parliament, which he did on 25 March 1784.
Arthur Wellesley, 1st Duke of Wellington	Tory	15 November 1830	Motion to consider the Civil List in a committee	204–233 29	The Government resigned on 16 November 1830.
Robert Peel	Conservative	7 April 1835	Report on the Irish Church	285–258 27	The Government resigned on 8 April 1835.
William Lamb, 2nd Viscount Melbourne	Whig	4 June 1841	Motion of no confidence	312–311 1	The Prime Minister advised Queen Victoria to dissolve Parliament, which she did on 23 June 1841.
William Lamb, 2nd Viscount Melbourne	Whig	27 August 1841 (Note: A Friday)	Amendment to the Address	269–360 91	The Government resigned on 30 August 1841. (Note: A Monday)
Robert Peel	Conservative	25 June 1846	Second Reading of the Irish Coercion Bill	219–292 73	The Government resigned on 27 June 1846.
Lord John Russell	Whig	20 February 1851	Motion to assimilate county to borough franchise	100–52 48	The Government resigned on 22 February 1851 but resumed on 3 March 1851.
Lord John Russell	Whig	20 February 1852	First Reading of the Local Militia Bill	125–136 11	The Government resigned on 21 February 1852.
Edward Smith-Stanley, 14th Earl of Derby	Conservative	16 December 1852 (Note: House adjourned at 3.45AM on 17 December 1852)	Budget	286–305 19	The Government resigned on 17 December 1852.
George Hamilton-Gordon, 4th Earl of Aberdeen	Peelite	29 January 1855 (Note: House adjourned at 1.45AM on 30 January 1855.)	Vote in favour of a select committee to enquire into alleged mismanagement during the Crimean War	305–148 157	The Government resigned on 30 January 1855.
Henry John Temple, 3rd Viscount Palmerston	Whig	3 March 1857	Dissatisfaction with Government explanation of the Arrow affair and the start of the Second Opium War	263–247 16	The Prime Minister advised Queen Victoria to dissolve Parliament, which she did on 21 March 1857.
Henry John Temple, 3rd Viscount Palmerston	Whig	19 February 1858 (Note: House adjourned at 1.30AM on 20 February 1858.)	Second Reading of the Conspiracy to Murder Bill	215–234 19	The Government resigned on 21 February 1858.
Edward Smith-Stanley, 14th Earl of Derby	Conservative	10 June 1859 (Note: House adjourned at 2.30AM on 11 June 1859.)	Amendment to the Address	323–310 13	The Government resigned on 11 June 1859.
John Russell, 1st Earl Russell	Liberal	18 June 1866	Amendment to the Parliamentary Reform Bill	315–304 11	The Government resigned on 26 June 1866.
William Ewart Gladstone	Liberal	12 March 1873	Second Reading of the Irish University Bill	284–287 3	The Government resigned on 12 March 1873 but resumed on 20 March 1873.
William Ewart Gladstone	Liberal	8 June 1885 (Note: House adjourned at 1.45AM on 9 June 1885.)	Budget	252–264 12	The Government resigned on 9 June 1885.
Robert Gascoyne-Cecil, 3rd Marquess of Salisbury	Conservative	26 January 1886 (Note: House adjourned at 1.15AM on 27 January 1886.)	Amendment to the Address	329–250 79	The Government resigned on 28 January 1886.
William Ewart Gladstone	Liberal	7 June 1886 (Note: House adjourned at 1.30AM on 8 June 1886.)	Second Reading of the Government of Ireland Bill	311–341 30	The Prime Minister advised Queen Victoria to dissolve Parliament, which she did on 26 June 1886.
Robert Gascoyne-Cecil, 3rd Marquess of Salisbury	Conservative	11 August 1892 (Note: House adjourned at 12.25AM on 12 August 1892.)	Amendment to the Address	350–310 40	The Government resigned on 11 August 1892.
Archibald Primrose, 5th Earl of Rosebery	Liberal	21 June 1895	The Cordite Vote	132–125 7	The Government resigned on 21 June 1895.
Stanley Baldwin	Conservative	21 January 1924	Amendment to the Address	328–251 77	The Government resigned on 22 January 1924.
Ramsay MacDonald	Labour	8 October 1924	Motion in respect of the Campbell Case	364–198 166	The Prime Minister advised King George V to dissolve Parliament, which he did on 9 October 1924.

=== Votes since 1940 ===
The list below includes all confidence motions since 1945 and some between 1940 and 1945. Government-defeated motions are noted in bold.

Prime Minister in office	Party	Date	Subject of motion	Result (Noes–Ayes) Majority	Consequences
Neville Chamberlain	Conservative	8 May 1940	Motion to adjourn the House	200–281 81	The Government resigned on 10 May 1940 despite winning the no-confidence vote.
Winston Churchill	Conservative	13 May 1940	Vote welcoming the formation of the Government	0–381 381	
Winston Churchill	Conservative	29 January 1942	Motion of Confidence in His Majesty's Government	1–464 463	
Winston Churchill	Conservative	2 July 1942	Vote of no confidence in central direction of war	25–475 450	
Clement Attlee	Labour	6 December 1945	Motion of censure	197–381 184	
Winston Churchill	Conservative	4 December 1952	Motion of censure	280–304 24	
Anthony Eden	Conservative	1 November 1956	Amendment to motion	255–324 69	
Anthony Eden	Conservative	6 December 1956	Amendment to motion	260–327 67	
Harold Macmillan	Conservative	5 February 1962	Motion to deplore	228–326 98	
Harold Macmillan	Conservative	26 July 1962	Motion to dissolve parliament	253–351 98	
Harold Wilson	Labour	10 November 1964	Amendment to address	294–315 21	
Harold Wilson	Labour	2 February 1965	Motion to deplore the Government	289–306 17	
Harold Wilson	Labour	2 August 1965	Motion of no confidence	290–303 13	
Harold Wilson	Labour	27 July 1966	Motion of no confidence	246–325 79	
Harold Wilson	Labour	27 July 1966	Motion of no confidence	246–325 79	
Harold Wilson	Labour	1 December 1966	Motion of no confidence	246–329 83	
Harold Wilson	Labour	24 July 1967	Motion of no confidence	240–333 93	
Edward Heath	Conservative	17 February 1972	Second Reading of the European Communities Bill	301–309 8	
Edward Heath	Conservative	6 March 1972	Motion to condemn the Government	270–317 47	
Edward Heath	Conservative	19 November 1973	Motion of no confidence	286–304 18	
Harold Wilson	Labour	11 March 1976	Motion to adjourn the House	280–297 17	
James Callaghan	Labour	9 June 1976	Motion of no confidence	290–309 19	
James Callaghan	Labour	23 March 1977	Motion of no confidence	298–322 24	
James Callaghan	Labour	20 July 1977	Motion to adjourn the House	282–312 30	
James Callaghan	Labour	14 December 1978	Motion of confidence	290–300 10	
James Callaghan	Labour	**28 March 1979**	**Motion of no confidence**	**311–310** **1**	The Prime Minister advised Queen Elizabeth II to dissolve Parliament on 7 April 1979.
Margaret Thatcher	Conservative	28 February 1980	Motion of no confidence	268–327 59	
Margaret Thatcher	Conservative	29 July 1980	Motion of no confidence	274–333 59	
Margaret Thatcher	Conservative	27 July 1981	Motion of no confidence	262–334 72	
Margaret Thatcher	Conservative	28 October 1981	Motion of no confidence	210–312 102	
Margaret Thatcher	Conservative	31 January 1985	Motion to censure	222–395 173	
Margaret Thatcher	Conservative	22 November 1990	Motion of no confidence	247–367 120	
John Major	Conservative	27 March 1991	Motion of no confidence	238–358 120	
John Major	Conservative	24 September 1992	Amendment to motion	288–330 42	
John Major	Conservative	23 July 1993	Motion of confidence	299–339 40	
John Major	Conservative	1 December 1993	Motion of no confidence	95–282 187	The only modern example of a confidence motion in the House of Lords.
John Major	Conservative	28 November 1994	Second Reading of the European Communities (Finance) Bill	303–330 27	
Theresa May	Conservative	16 January 2019	Motion of no confidence	306–325 19	
Boris Johnson	Conservative	18 July 2022	Motion of confidence	238–347 109	Held during July-September 2022 Conservative Party leadership election, after Johnson announced his intention to resign on 7 July.

=== Votes in devolved legislatures ===
Devolved legislature	First Minister in office	Party	Date	Subject of motion	Result (Noes–Ayes) Majority	Consequences
Welsh Assembly	Alun Michael	Labour	2 November 1999	Motion of no confidence in the First Secretary	26–8 18	Political crisis in the Assembly continued over constitutional disagreements and failure of Michael's administration to secure funding from the Treasury for EU Objective One funds. Michael later resigned amid a successful second no confidence motion in February 2000.
Welsh Assembly	Alun Michael	Labour	9 February 2000	Motion of no confidence in the First Secretary	**27–31** 4	Michael resigned as First Secretary (Note: Michael attempted to pre-empt the vote by tendering his resignation to Assembly Presiding Officer Dafydd Elis-Thomas moments before it was held, however he refused to accept Michael's resignation until after the motion was held and passed.) and Rhodri Morgan was nominated by the Assembly to succeed him before going on to form a new Labour administration and later a coalition with the Liberal Democrats.
Northern Ireland Assembly	Arlene Foster	DUP	19 December 2016	Motion of no confidence in the First Minister	**36–39** 3	Despite a majority voting in favour, the motion failed due to not obtaining cross-community support so Foster continued as First Minister. She later lost the role automatically when her deputy first minister resigned on 10 January 2017.
Scottish Parliament	Nicola Sturgeon	SNP	23 March 2021	Motion of no confidence in the First Minister	65–31 34	Sturgeon remained as First Minister. And the government was re-elected in the 2021 Holyrood election shortly after.
Scottish Parliament	Humza Yousaf	SNP	1 May 2024	Motion of no confidence in the Scottish government	70–58 12	Yousaf formally resigned on 7 May 2024, having already announced his intention to prior to the confidence motion, and John Swinney became First Minister.
Senedd	Vaughan Gething	Labour	5 June 2024	Non-binding motion of no confidence in the First Minister	**27–29** 2	Gething announced he would continue as First Minister due to the non-binding nature of the motion. However, he announced his resignation a month later amid a government crisis.
Northern Ireland Assembly	Michelle O'Neill	Sinn Féin	10 November 2025	Motion of no confidence in the Education Minister, the DUP's Paul Girvan	**33–47** 14	Despite a majority voting in favour, the motion failed due to not obtaining cross-community support so Girvan continued as Education Minister.
Northern Ireland Assembly	Michelle O'Neill	Sinn Féin	12 October 2026	Motion of no confidence in the First Minister and other Sinn Féin ministers	36–34 2	O'Neill continued as First Minister

== Constitutional practice ==
=== Before 2011 and after 2021 ===
If a government wins a confidence motion they are able to remain in office. If a confidence motion is lost then the Government is obliged to resign or seek a dissolution of Parliament and call a general election. Although this is a convention, prior to the 2011 Fixed-term Parliaments Act there was no law which required that the government resign or call a general election. Modern practice shows dissolution rather than resignation to be the result of a defeat. The government is only obliged to resign if it loses a confidence vote, although a significant defeat on a major issue may lead to a confidence motion.

During the period 1945–1970 governments were rarely defeated in the House of Commons and the impression grew that if a government was defeated it must reverse the decision, seek a vote of confidence, or resign.

Brazier argues: "it used to be the case that a defeat on a major matter had the same effect as if an explicit vote of confidence had carried" but that a development in constitutional practice has occurred since the 1970s. Thatcher's defeat over the Shops Bill 1986 did not trigger a confidence motion despite being described as 'a central piece of their legislative programme'. The government simply accepted that they could not pass the bill and gave assurances to Parliament that they would not introduce it.

After a defeat on a major issue of government policy the government may resign, dissolve Parliament, or seek a vote of confidence from the House. Recent historical practice has been to seek a vote of confidence from the House. John Major did this after defeat over the Social Protocol of the Maastricht Treaty. Defeats on minor issues do not raise any constitutional questions.

A proposed motion of no confidence can force a resignation. For example, in 2009 the proposed vote of no confidence in the Speaker of the House of Commons forced the resignation of Michael Martin in the wake of the Parliamentary Expenses Scandal. Several MPs breached a constitutional convention and openly called for the resignation of the Speaker.

=== 2011–2022 ===
Under the Fixed-term Parliaments Act 2011, a passing of a motion of no confidence was one of only two ways in which an early election could occur (the other was a motion to hold an early election passed by at least two-thirds of MPs). Following a successful motion, Parliament must dissolve, unless the motion was overturned within 14 days by the passing of an explicit motion of confidence. This procedure was designed to allow a minority government time to seek the support of other parties (as a formal coalition or with a confidence and supply arrangement) to avoid having to face re-election, or to allow an alternative government to be formed.

In principle, the alternative government could be led by any MP who could draw together enough support for a legislative programme that secured a vote of confidence and, by convention, a request from the monarch to form such a government. In practice, it was likely to be the leader, or a senior member, of a party with a significant number of MPs that could achieve this. In turn, they could be expected to bring about an early election using the two-thirds of MPs provision of the Fixed-Term Act to gain a popular mandate for their programme.

The only such motion under the 2011 Act was tabled on 15 January 2019, following the defeat of Theresa May's Brexit deal, and was voted on the following day. May won the vote.

== See also ==
- Motion of no confidence
- Constitution of the United Kingdom
- Dissolution of the Parliament of the United Kingdom
- Lascelles Principles – relating to the sovereign's power to dissolve Parliament

== Bibliography ==
- Butler, David; Butler, Gareth (1994). British Political Facts 1900–1994. Macmillan. ISBN 0-333-52616-3.
- Cook, Chris; Stevenson, John (1980). British Historical Facts 1760–1830. Macmillan. ISBN 0-333-21512-5.
- Cook, Chris; Keith, Brendan (1975). British Historical Facts 1830–1900. Macmillan. ISBN 0-333-13220-3.
- Rallings, Colin; Thrasher, Michael (2000). British Electoral Facts 1832–1999. Ashgate. ISBN 1-84014-053-4.
