= 1841 vote of no confidence in the Melbourne ministry =

1841 vote of no confidence in the Melbourne ministry may refer to two distinct events:

- June 1841 vote of no confidence in the Melbourne ministry
- August 1841 vote of no confidence in the Melbourne ministry
