= 2019 vote of confidence in the May ministry =

Motion of no confidence in the government of Theresa May

On 15 January 2019, a motion of no confidence in the government of Theresa May was tabled in the House of Commons. On 16 January, the House rejected the motion by a vote of 325 to 306.

The motion was laid by Jeremy Corbyn, the Leader of the Labour Party and Leader of the Opposition, after the government had lost a Commons vote to secure parliamentary backing for the government's deal for Britain's withdrawal from the European Union by 230 votes on the evening of 15 January. That vote, 432 to 202 for rejecting the deal, represented the largest defeat for a sitting government in modern history.

The motion was debated on the afternoon of 16 January before it was voted on that evening. The vote went along party lines; The ruling Conservatives opposed the motion, as did the Democratic Unionist Party in accordance with their confidence and supply agreement, whilst all other opposition parties supported it.

Following the vote, Prime Minister Theresa May requested individual meetings with leaders of all parties to discuss how to continue with the process of leaving the European Union. Corbyn declined the invitation, saying he would not meet her unless she would ensure that a no-deal Brexit would not occur, while all other party leaders accepted it.

== Background ==
The Conservative government elected in the 2017 general election was a minority government, relying on a confidence and supply agreement with the Democratic Unionist Party to give it a small working majority in the House of Commons.

In December 2018, May had faced a vote of confidence from members of the Parliamentary Conservative Party because of opposition from Eurosceptic Conservative MPs to her Brexit withdrawal agreement, which they felt would compromise British control over its borders because its inclusion of a proposal for an Irish backstop, which would allow for the possibility of Northern Ireland remaining within the EU Customs Union as a means to avoid a physical border with the Irish Republic after Britain's departure from the EU. However, although May won the vote comfortably with a majority of 83, plans for the House of Commons to debate the Brexit agreement in December were postponed until the new year when it became clear Parliament would reject it.

On 17 December, after following May's decision to delay the vote, Corbyn tabled a motion of no confidence in her premiership but not against the government. The following day, the government refused to allow time for the motion to be debated, which Speaker John Bercow confirmed that it had no obligation to do.

Parliament then debated the Brexit agreement in January 2019, with the vote on whether to back May's plans taking place on 15 January. The deal was rejected by Parliament, with a majority of 230 voting against it. The result, 432 to 202 for rejecting the deal, represented the largest defeat for a sitting government in modern history. Addressing the House of Commons in the wake of the result, May said that she would welcome a vote of confidence in her government and would allow time for it to be debated the following day. Corbyn then tabled a motion of no confidence in the government in the hope of triggering an early general election.

== Proceedings ==
Andrea Leadsom, the Leader of the House of Commons, said that the House's afternoon session on 16 January, following the conclusion of Prime Minister's Questions, would be dedicated to the debate, with a vote expected at around 19:00.

In accordance with the Fixed-term Parliaments Act 2011, the text of the motion was "That this House has no confidence in Her Majesty's Government". In addition to Corbyn, it was co-sponsored by Ian Blackford (SNP leader at Westminster), Vince Cable (leader of the Liberal Democrats), Liz Saville Roberts (Plaid Cymru leader at Westminster), Caroline Lucas (the only Green MP) and Nick Brown (Labour Chief Whip) and signed by a further 38 MPs.

== Division ==
The motion was defeated by 325 votes to 306: a majority of 19. All ten DUP MPs and the independent MP Sylvia Hermon voted with the government. All the other party-aligned members of the Commons supported Labour's motion, as did some independent MPs, including the former Labour member Jared O'Mara and former Liberal Democrat member Stephen Lloyd. Three independent MPs, all formerly in Labour, abstained, as did Labour MP Paul Flynn, who was too ill to vote, and in fact died one month later.

Motion of no confidence
Ballot →	16 January 2019
Required majority →	318 out of 635 voting MPs (Note: Based on 650 MPs minus seven Sinn Féin MPs who follow a policy of abstentionism and eight others: the Speaker John Bercow, the Deputy Speakers (Lindsay Hoyle, Eleanor Laing and Rosie Winterton), who do not vote; and the tellers (for the Ayes, Jeff Smith and Jessica Morden, and for the Noes, Chris Pincher and Julian Smith), whose votes are not taken into account (total 15).)
Ayes: • Labour (251); • SNP (35); • Lib Dem (11); • Plaid Cymru (4); • Green (1); • Independent (4)	306 / 635
Noes: • Conservative (314); • DUP (10); • Independent (1)	325 / 635
Abstentions: • Labour (1) (Note: Paul Flynn was unable to attend the vote for health reasons.); • Independent (3) (Note: The three independent abstentions were Ivan Lewis, Fiona Onasanya, and John Woodcock, all previously elected as Labour MPs.)	4 / 635
Sources: Hansard

== Aftermath ==
After the result, May told members of the House of Commons she would "continue to work to deliver on the solemn promise to the people of this country to deliver on the result of the referendum [of 2016] and leave the European Union". As a result, she requested to meet leaders of all parties to have individual meetings on how to continue with the process of leaving the European Union. In reaction to the result, Corbyn asked May to ensure that a no-deal Brexit would not occur by telling MPs that the government should "remove clearly, once and for all, the prospect of the catastrophe of a no-deal exit from the EU". That idea of eliminating the possibility of a no-deal Brexit was backed by the SNP.

May made a statement to the nation from Downing Street at 10:00 p.m. In it, she urged MPs to "put self-interest aside" and "work constructively together" to achieve a solution to Brexit.

On the next day, it was reported that Chancellor of the Exchequer Philip Hammond had reassured executives from leading companies when he spoke to them for more than an hour at 9.30 p.m. on Tuesday that the government had no intention to have a no-deal Brexit occurring. He also said that a backbench motion could force the government to rescind Article 50. That would act as a "sort of ultimate backstop if the work the government is doing in seeking to find a way forward fails to deliver".

Corbyn also laid out conditions for the Labour party to support a second referendum. In a speech, he asserted, "If the government remains intransigent, if support for Labour's alternative is blocked for party advantage – and the country is facing the potential disaster of no deal – our duty will then be to look at other options which we've set out in our conference motion, including the option of a public vote". He also requested through the use of email that Labour MPs should not partake in any Brexit discussions with the government until May would rule out a no-deal Brexit, after Labour MPs Hilary Benn, Yvette Cooper and John Mann went to the Cabinet Office to meet Conservative ministers and discuss a solution to the crisis.

== See also ==
- List of votes of no confidence in British governments
- 2019 United Kingdom general election
- Second May ministry
