= 1993 vote of confidence in the Major ministry =

Successful vote of confidence in the United Kingdom

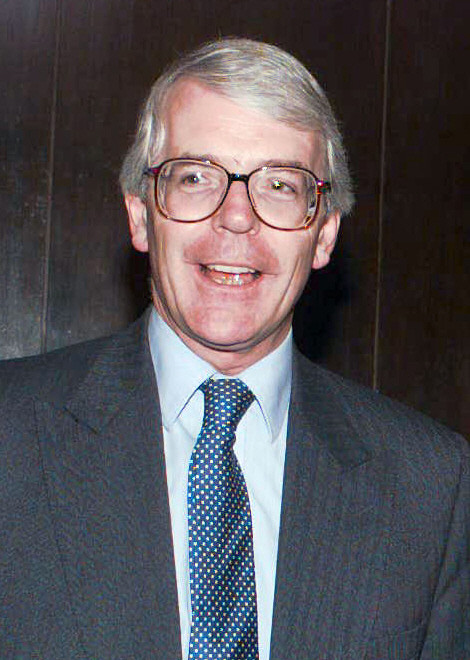
John Major

The 1993 confidence motion in the second Major ministry was an explicit confidence motion in the Conservative government of John Major. It was proposed in order to ensure support in the British Parliament for the passing of the Maastricht Treaty. Due to previous defeats caused when Eurosceptic Conservative MPs voted with the opposition, the Government had to obtain support for its policy on the Social Chapter before the European Communities Amendment Act 1993 could come into effect and allow the United Kingdom to ratify the treaty. Dissenting Conservative MPs were willing to vote against the Government, but had to come into line on a confidence motion or else lose the Conservative whip. Only one eurosceptic MP was deliberately absent; and as a result, the motion passed by 40 votes and the United Kingdom ratified the Maastricht Treaty.

== European Communities Amendment Bill ==
At Maastricht, John Major had negotiated a treaty which allowed the European Union to develop, but with the United Kingdom opting out of the 'Social Chapter' provisions on employment law. The opt out was strongly opposed by the Labour opposition, although it supported the treaty as a whole. The treaty itself was opposed by a minority of Members of Parliament in both main parties, who were termed Eurosceptics due to their concern at the way the European Communities had developed as an institution.

As the Maastricht Treaty increased the powers of the European Communities, an Act of Parliament was needed to give effect to those powers in UK domestic law before the Government could ratify it. The Government introduced the European Communities Amendment Bill almost immediately after the general election in April 1992. As the Bill affected the constitution, its committee stage had to be taken in a Committee of the Whole House. Eurosceptics who opposed the treaty put down hundreds of amendments, and the Committee stage lasted from 1 December 1992 to 21 April 1993. At the end the Government accepted new clause no. 74, proposed by the Labour front bench, which required an explicit vote by both Houses of Parliament on a Government motion "considering the question of adopting the Protocol on Social Policy" before the Act could be implemented. Labour spokesman on Europe George Robertson described the new clause as a 'ticking time bomb' under the Government.

== Government defeat ==
The European Communities Amendment Bill successfully passed through its Parliamentary stages and received Royal assent on 20 July 1993, with new clause 74 having become section 7 of the Act. The Government then scheduled a debate in the House of Commons on 22 July on a motion under section 7; at Prime Minister's Question Time on 20 July, Major gave the impression that he would ratify the treaty even if the Government lost the vote, because Parliament had approved the treaty he signed.

The motion debated on 22 July declared:

That this House, in compliance with the requirements of section 7 of the European Communities (Amendment) Act 1993, notes the policy of Her Majesty's Government on the adoption of the Protocol on Social Policy.

The Labour front bench moved an amendment to change the motion to:

That, in the opinion of this House, Her Majesty's Government should not deposit the Articles of Ratification of the Treaty of European Union with the government of the Italian Republic until such time as it has given notification to the European Community that it intends to adopt the agreement attached to protocol on social policy.

Following a long and at times acrimonious debate, the Labour amendment was voted on first; and the result was dramatically announced as a tie with 317 MPs voting in favour and 317 MPs voting against. The Speaker, Betty Boothroyd, gave her casting vote against the amendment pursuant to Speaker Denison's rule (it was later discovered that there had been a miscount of those supporting the motion, and that one more had been counted in its support than had actually voted, so that the amendment had actually been defeated by one vote). After the amendment was voted down, the Government motion was put to the vote and lost by eight votes, 316 in favour and 324 against.

== The confidence debate ==
Immediately that the result was known, John Major announced that the next day (a Friday, which would normally be given over to light Parliamentary business) would now be a debate on a motion of confidence approving the Government's policy on the Social Chapter. This debate began at 9:30 AM, with a packed House. John Major was reckoned by observers not to have been as effective a speaker on Friday as he had been on Thursday, telling the House that "this country cannot afford to let this stalemate on European policy continue. It is against the interests of government in this country to do so. This House must decide today whether it is prepared to sustain the Government in office or encourage me to seek a dissolution." The Leader of the Opposition John Smith was said to be "on top form", making several jokes at the expense of Major, whom he likened to a cricketer being forced to follow-on after being clean bowled. Smith described the "quasi-motion of confidence" as "not a sign of confidence, but a display of weakness".

The opposition front bench amendment requiring the Government to remove its opt out from the Social Chapter was voted down by 301 to 339, and the Government motion was then agreed by 339 to 299. Examining the lists of MPs who had voted disclosed one Conservative MP who had been absent and not voted: Rupert Allason, Member for Torbay was subsequently found to have left the country on the Wednesday. Allason admitted he ought to have returned for the vote, and wrote to the Prime Minister to apologise; nonetheless, he still had the Conservative Party whip suspended.

== See also ==
- 1979 vote of no confidence in the Callaghan ministry
- List of votes of no confidence in British governments
