= Irish University Bill =

The Irish University Bill (Bill 55 of session 36 Victoria; long title A Bill for the Extension of University Education in Ireland; proposed short title the University Act (Ireland), 1873) was a bill introduced in the Parliament of the United Kingdom in 1873 by the first Gladstone government to expand the University of Dublin into a secular national university incorporating multiple colleges.

== Proposal ==
In 1873, as now, Dublin University comprised a single college, Trinity College, which was founded in 1592. Admission had been restricted to members of the established Anglican Church of Ireland till the Catholic Relief Act 1793. The Irish Church Act 1869 disestablished the church, but scholars, fellows and professors of the college were still required to be Anglicans.

The secular Queen's University of Ireland had been founded in 1845–50 with colleges in Belfast, Cork, and Galway. Lacking government recognition were the Catholic University of Ireland founded in Dublin in 1851 and the Presbyterian Magee College founded in Derry in 1865. The 1873 bill proposed to abolish the failing Galway college and make all the other colleges of an expanded Dublin University. All religious requirements for students and faculty in all colleges would be abolished. Trinity College's Theology faculty would be detached and removed to the control of the Church of Ireland.

== Opposition ==
The proposal was strongly opposed by the Roman Catholic Church in Ireland, and partly opposed by the Presbyterians and the existing Trinity College faculty. It was defeated by three votes on its second reading in the House of Commons on 11 March 1873. This was one factor in the eventual fall of the government in 1874.

== Later ==
The abolition of the Anglican test oath for Dublin University and Trinity College, except in the School of Divinity, was affected by the University of Dublin Tests Act 1873 (An Act to abolish Tests in Trinity College and the University of Dublin; 36 & 37 Vict. c. 22) introduced by Henry Fawcett and hence called "Fawcett's Act". Until 1970, the Irish Catholic hierarchy discouraged Catholics from attending the university. Under the Disraeli administration, the University Education (Ireland) Act 1879 altered the Queen's University of Ireland into the Royal University of Ireland and facilitated access to it for the Catholic and Presbyterian colleges. Trinity College and Dublin University were not affected.
