= 1979 vote of no confidence in the Callaghan ministry =

Political event in the United Kingdom

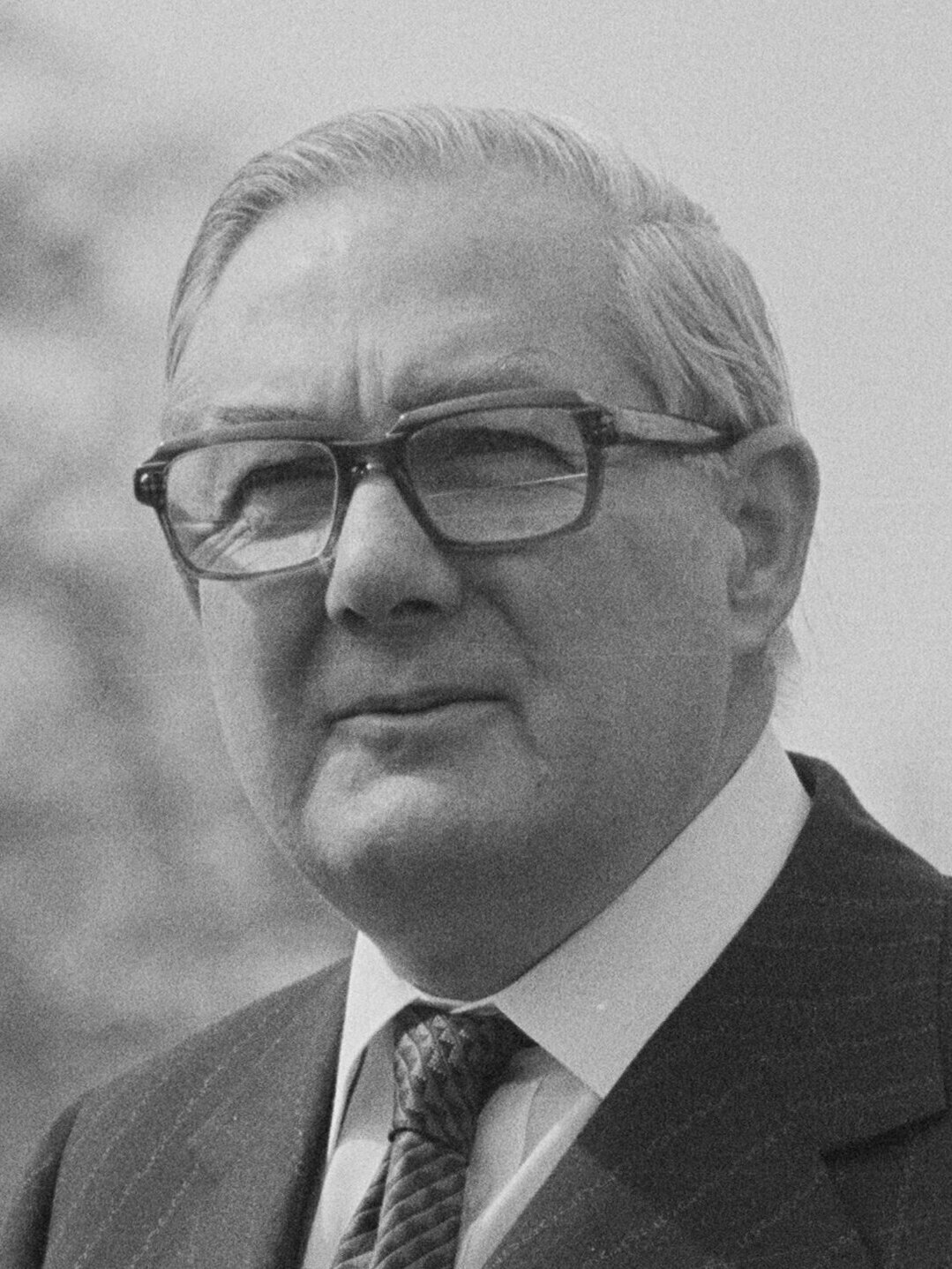
Prime Minister James Callaghan lost the vote of no confidence by just one vote.

A vote of no confidence in the British Labour government of James Callaghan occurred on 28 March 1979. The vote was brought by the Official Opposition leader Margaret Thatcher and was lost by the Labour government by one vote (311 votes to 310), which was announced at 10:19 pm. The result mandated a general election that was won by Thatcher's Conservative Party. The last time an election had been forced by the House of Commons was in 1924, when Ramsay MacDonald, the first Labour prime minister, lost a vote of confidence. Labour politician Roy Hattersley later remarked that the vote marked "the last rites" of Old Labour. Labour did not return to government until 1997, under Tony Blair's New Labour. The BBC has referred to the vote as "one of the most dramatic nights in Westminster history".

== Background ==
The general election at the end of February 1974 resulted in a hung parliament where Labour had slightly more seats than any other party but no overall majority. The Conservatives tried to negotiate a coalition with the Liberal Party but failed and Edward Heath's government resigned. Labour came to power in March 1974, its leader Harold Wilson having accepted the royal invitation to form a minority government. Wilson called a second election for October 1974, which gave Labour a majority of three MPs. The Labour government implemented pay restraint to control global inflation, coupled with stagnation and unemployment at record post-war levels. Wilson resigned in 1976 in poor health, on turning 60, and James Callaghan became leader of the Labour Party and Prime Minister. By-elections and defections whittled away Labour's majority, which was non-existent by late 1976 in the House of Commons after a by-election defeat, the defection of two Labour MPs to form the Scottish Labour Party and the resignation of backbencher John Stonehouse.

In 1977 the Labour government and the Liberal Party agreed to the Lib–Lab pact by which the Liberals agreed to support the government in return for pre-legislative consultation. The pact lasted for a year before lapsing in July 1978, at which point the Liberal Party declared that they supported a general election as soon as possible and would therefore support any no confidence motions. Callaghan was widely expected to call an election in September 1978 but decided against this, hoping he would fare better in a year's time once the economy had improved; however, the winter saw a prolonged period of industrial unrest known as the Winter of Discontent which severely reduced Labour's popularity.

On 14 December 1978, the government survived a vote of confidence by ten votes after negotiating the support of the Ulster Unionists. Draft legislation was before the House to give Northern Ireland more parliamentary seats; it cleared the House of Commons on 17 January 1979.

14 December 1978; Vote of confidence in the Callaghan ministry Motion proposed by James Callaghan MP; Absolute majority: 315/629
Vote	Parties	Votes
Aye	Labour Party (295); Plaid Cymru (2); Ulster Unionist Party (1); Scottish Labour Party (2)	300 / 635
No	Conservative Party (267); Liberal Party (11); Scottish National Party (9); Ulster Unionist Party (1); Democratic Unionist Party (1); Independent (1)	290 / 635
Did not vote	Speaker of the House (1); Deputy Speakers of the House (3); Conservative Party (11); Labour Party (11); Ulster Unionist Party (5); Liberal Party (2); Scottish National Party (2); Plaid Cymru (1); Social Democratic and Labour Party (1); Independent Republican (1); United Ulster Unionist Party (1)	39 / 635
Tellers	Labour Party (2); Conservative Party (2); not counted in vote totals	4 / 635
Vacant	(2), not counted in vote totals	2 / 635

On 1 March 1979, a referendum on the Scotland Act saw a majority vote for devolution, but a threshold imposed by anti-devolution MP George Cunningham requiring 40% of the electorate to be in favour was not reached due to low turnout. When the government decided not to implement the Act, the Scottish National Party MPs put down a motion of no confidence. After consulting with the Liberal Party to confirm that they were still supporting motions of no confidence, on Monday, 26 March, the Leader of the Opposition, Margaret Thatcher, put down an early day motion "[t]hat this House has no confidence in Her Majesty's Government." The government arranged for this motion to be debated on Wednesday 28 March as an opposition motion in government time.

== Motion and debate ==
"Mr. Speaker, I beg to move, 'That this House has no confidence in Her Majesty's Government.'"

— The motion moved by Margaret Thatcher

During the debate, Callaghan criticised the Scottish National Party, committed to independence for Scotland, for voting with the Conservative Party who opposed devolution. The Scottish National Party would subsequently lose all but two of their seats in the election following the no confidence vote.

We can truly say that once the Leader of the Opposition discovered what the Liberals and the SNP would do, she found the courage of their convictions. So, tonight, the Conservative Party, which wants the Act repealed and opposes even devolution, will march through the Lobby with the SNP, which wants independence for Scotland, and with the Liberals, who want to keep the Act. What a massive display of unsullied principle! The minority parties have walked into a trap. If they win, there will be a general election. I am told that the current joke going around the House is that it is the first time in recorded history that turkeys have been known to vote for an early Christmas.

— James Callaghan during the no-confidence debate

As leader of the House of Commons, Michael Foot closed the debate. During his speech, he made a widely quoted put-down of Liberal leader David Steel, describing him as having "passed from rising hope to elder statesman without any intervening period whatsoever".

== Vote ==
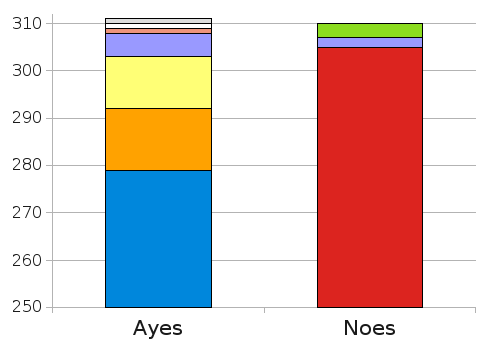
Top part of chart of votes by party (including tellers). Ayes: Conservative; Liberal; SNP; UUP; DUP; UUUP. Noes: Labour; UUP; Plaid Cymru. First 250 Con/Lab votes not shown

The government lost by one vote. James Hamilton, Labour's Scottish whip, reportedly thought for a moment that the support of two Ulster Unionist MPs would allow the government a narrow victory. Margaret Thatcher initially believed she had lost the vote after a rough calculation as to the vote's outcome had been made without counting the two Conservative tellers who had counted the votes. Due to the closeness of the vote, there is some debate as to whether deals could have been made which would have kept the government in power. Had the vote been tied, the Speaker of the House of Commons, George Thomas, would probably have followed Speaker Denison's rule and used his casting vote in favour of the status quo and thus against the motion. Following the vote, Conservative backbenchers cheered while Labour left-wingers, led by Neil Kinnock, sang "The Red Flag".

28 March 1979; Vote of no confidence in the Callaghan ministry Motion proposed by Margaret Thatcher MP; Absolute majority: 315/629
Vote	Parties	Votes
Aye	Conservative Party (279); Liberal Party (13); Scottish National Party (11); Ulster Unionist Party (5); United Ulster Unionist Party (1); Democratic Unionist Party (1); Independent (1, James Kilfedder)	311 / 635
No	Labour Party (303); Plaid Cymru (3); Ulster Unionist Party (2); Scottish Labour Party (2)	310 / 635
Did not vote	Speaker of the House (1); Deputy Speakers of the House (3); Labour Party (1, Sir Alfred Broughton); Social Democratic and Labour Party (1, Gerry Fitt); Independent Republican (1, Frank Maguire)	7 / 635
Tellers	Labour Party (2), Conservative Party (2); not counted in vote totals	4 / 635
Vacant	(3), not counted in vote totals	3 / 635

=== Ulster Unionists ===
Before the vote, there were some discussions between Labour and the Ulster Unionist Party, including Enoch Powell, regarding a deal over a pipeline which would provide cheap energy to Northern Ireland. Callaghan was unwilling to support the proposal due to unhappiness with minority government. There were also discussions about a separate inflation index for Northern Ireland. In the end, only two of the Ulster Unionists (John Carson and Harold McCusker) voted for the government.

=== Sir Alfred Broughton ===
One crucial vote was lost by Labour backbencher Sir Alfred Broughton, who was unable to attend the vote due to ill health. Broughton (professionally a doctor) was mortally ill and died on 2 April, a few days after the vote, but he was determined to come to Westminster if it meant saving the government; his own doctor was strongly opposed. Parliamentary procedure would have allowed his vote to be counted even if he remained within an ambulance at Speaker's Court. After a debate over what would happen if Broughton died en route, Callaghan decided that he would not risk Broughton's health by asking him to travel, a decision which was to bring down the government.

==== Pairing convention ====
Bernard Weatherill played a critical role in the defeat of the government in the vote of confidence. As the vote loomed, Labour's deputy chief whip, Walter Harrison, approached Weatherill to enforce the pairing convention that if a sick MP from the government could not vote, an MP from the opposition would abstain to compensate. Weatherill said that pairing had never been intended for votes on matters of confidence that meant the life or death of the government, and it would be impossible to find a Conservative MP who would agree to abstain. After a moment's reflection, Weatherill agreed to abstain. Harrison was so impressed by Weatherill's offer—which would have effectively ended his political career—that he released Weatherill from his obligation and so the government fell by one vote on the agreement of gentlemen.

=== Clement Freud ===
During the last year of the Callaghan government, it proposed reinventing the one year Lib–Lab pact which lapsed in July 1978 to include introducing the Freedom of Information Act, long proposed by the Liberal Party; Callaghan himself was opposed to this kind of legislation. When the vote of no confidence came about, Liberal MP Clement Freud, a long-time campaigner for freedom of information, was expected to follow his party and vote with the opposition. Freud, in Liverpool on the day of the vote, received a phone call from the Prime Minister's office at 3:00 pm asking for him to miss his train back to London for the 10:00 pm vote of no confidence. In exchange, a looser version of his proposed Freedom of Information Act would be enacted. He declined the offer and voted with his party.

=== Welsh Nationalists ===
Plaid Cymru supported the Labour government after extracting concessions from them.

=== Irish Nationalists ===
Without Broughton, Labour needed the support of Northern Irish MPs to tie the vote. Gerry Fitt, the leader of the Social Democratic and Labour Party, was sympathetic to the Labour Party, and Frank Maguire, an independent republican MP, had supported the government on previous knife-edge votes, but both were unhappy with proposals that would increase the number of constituencies in Northern Ireland and therefore increase Unionist representation. Fitt eventually decided not to support Labour but said that he would campaign for them to be re-elected if they lost. He urged Maguire to do the same. Although not an abstentionist MP, Maguire rarely attended the House of Commons. He told a journalist in London before the vote: "I have come over here to abstain in person." The BBC documentary A Parliamentary Coup stated that Maguire's wife was, unknown to Fitt, sitting in the public gallery of the House of Commons and urged her husband not to vote after hearing Fitt.

== Aftermath ==
When a vote of no confidence is passed, the government must either resign, allowing the Leader of the Opposition to attempt to form a government or ask The Crown to dissolve Parliament, which automatically triggers a general election. Callaghan opted for a general election, stating: "We shall take our case to the country." Parliament was not dissolved immediately after the vote; a couple of days' wash-up period was allowed for the completion of uncontroversial business, with 25 bills receiving royal assent on 2 April, including a stopgap Finance Act.

The resulting election was won by the Conservative Party and led to 18 years of Conservative rule. After losing, Callaghan remained Labour leader for another year before the succession of Michael Foot. The Scottish National Party also suffered in the 1979 general election, with its group reduced from 11 members to just two. The incoming Conservative government repealed the Scotland Act and devolution was not enacted until the 1997 Scottish devolution referendum.

== See also ==
- Norway Debate, another momentous Commons debate, 39 years earlier, which led to the appointment of Winston Churchill as Prime Minister
- This House, a play by James Graham
