= List of ministerial by-elections to the Parliament of the United Kingdom =

Ministerial by-elections to the House of Commons of the United Kingdom at Westminster were held from 1801 to the 1920s when a Member of Parliament (MP) was appointed as a minister in the government. Unlike most Westminster by-elections, ministerial by-elections were often a formality, uncontested by opposition parties. Re-election was required under the Succession to the Crown Act 1707. This was in line with the principle established in 1624 that accepting an office of profit from the Crown would precipitate resignation from the House, with the option of standing for re-election. Typically a minister sought re-election in the constituency he had just vacated, but occasionally contested another seat which was also vacant. In 1910 The Times newspaper noted that the relevant Act had been passed in the reign of Queen Anne "to prevent the Court from swamping the House of Commons with placemen and pensioners", and described the process as "anomalous" and "indefensible" in the 20th century. The Re-Election of Ministers Act 1919 ended the necessity to seek re-election within nine months of a general election, and the Re-Election of Ministers Act (1919) Amendment Act 1926 ended the practice in all other cases.

== Ministerial by-elections ==
=== 34th Parliament (1924–1929) ===
By-election	Date	Incumbent	Party	Winner	Party	Position
East Renfrewshire	29 January 1926	Alexander Munro MacRobert	Conservative	Alexander Munro MacRobert	Conservative	Solicitor General for Scotland
Bury St Edmunds	1 December 1925	Walter Guinness	Conservative	Walter Guinness	Conservative	Minister of Agriculture and Fisheries

=== 31st Parliament (1919–1922) ===
By-election	Date	Incumbent	Party	Winner	Party	Position
Pontypridd	25 July 1922	Thomas Arthur Lewis	National Liberal	Thomas Isaac Mardy Jones	Labour	Junior Lord of the Treasury
Banbury	22 June 1922 (Note: Uncontested)	Rhys Rhys-Williams	National Liberal	Rhys Rhys-Williams	National Liberal	Recorder of Cardiff
Liverpool Exchange	13 March 1922	Leslie Scott	Coalition Conservative	Leslie Scott	Coalition Conservative	Solicitor General
North Down	23 June 1921	Thomas Watters Brown	UUP	Thomas Watters Brown	UUP	Solicitor-General for Ireland
Bedford	23 April 1921	Frederick Kellaway	National Liberal	Frederick Kellaway	National Liberal	Postmaster General
Bewdley	19 April 1921	Stanley Baldwin	Coalition Conservative	Stanley Baldwin	Coalition Conservative	President of the Board of Trade
Eddisbury	19 April 1921	Harry Barnston	Coalition Conservative	Harry Barnston	Coalition Conservative	Comptroller of the Household
East Dorset	16 April 1921	Frederick Guest	National Liberal	Frederick Guest	National Liberal	Secretary of State for Air
Glasgow Pollok	14 April 1921	John Gilmour	Coalition Conservative	John Gilmour	Coalition Conservative	Junior Lord of the Treasury
Bristol West	9 April 1921	George Gibbs	Coalition Conservative	George Gibbs	Coalition Conservative	Treasurer of the Household
Birmingham West	31 March 1921	Austen Chamberlain	Coalition Conservative	Austen Chamberlain	Coalition Conservative	Lord Privy Seal
Dudley	3 March 1921	Arthur Griffith-Boscawen	Coalition Conservative	James Wilson	Labour	Appointment as Minister of Agriculture
Middleton and Prestwich	22 November 1920	Sir William Adkins	National Liberal	Sir William Adkins	National Liberal	Recorder of Birmingham
Sunderland	24 April 1920	Hamar Greenwood	National Liberal	Hamar Greenwood	National Liberal	Chief Secretary for Ireland
Edinburgh South	9 April 1920	Charles Murray	Coalition Conservative	Charles Murray	Coalition Conservative	Solicitor General for Scotland
Northampton	1 April 1920	Charles McCurdy	National Liberal	Charles McCurdy	National Liberal	Minister of Food Control
Camberwell North West	31 March 1920	Thomas James McNamara	National Liberal	Thomas James McNamara	National Liberal	Minister of Labour
Argyll	10 March 1920	William Sutherland	National Liberal	William Sutherland	National Liberal	Junior Lord of the Treasury

=== 30th Parliament (August 1914 – 1918) ===
By-election	Date	Incumbent	Party	Winner	Party	Position
East Grinstead	29 July 1918 (Note: Uncontested)	Henry Cautley	Conservative	Henry Cautley	Conservative	Recorder of Sunderland
Manchester North East	16 July 1918	J. R. Clynes	Labour	J. R. Clynes	Labour	Food Controller
Bridgwater	18 June 1918	Robert Sanders	Conservative	Robert Sanders	Conservative	Treasurer of the Household
Newcastle-upon-Tyne	13 May 1918	Edward Shortt	Liberal	Edward Shortt	Liberal	Chief Secretary for Ireland
Birmingham West	25 April 1918	Austen Chamberlain	Conservative	Austen Chamberlain	Conservative	Minister without Portfolio
Southampton	19 December 1917	William Dudley Ward	Liberal	William Dudley Ward	Liberal	Vice-Chamberlain of the Household
Dublin University	5 October 1917	Arthur Samuels	Irish Unionist	Arthur Samuels	Irish Unionist	Solicitor-General for Ireland
Norwich	26 August 1917	George Henry Roberts	Labour	George Henry Roberts	Labour	Minister of Labour
Dundee	30 July 1917	Winston Churchill	Liberal	Winston Churchill	Liberal	Minister of Munitions
Chesterton	27 July 1917	Edwin Samuel Montagu	Liberal	Edwin Samuel Montagu	Liberal	Secretary of State for India
Fulham	3 July 1917	William Hayes Fisher	Conservative	William Hayes Fisher	Conservative	President of the Local Government Board
Ealing	30 April 1917	Herbert Nield	Conservative	Herbert Nield	Conservative	Recorder of York
Belfast South	9 April 1917	James Chambers	Irish Unionist	James Chambers	Irish Unionist	Solicitor-General for Ireland
Exeter	7 August 1916	Henry Duke	Conservative	Henry Duke	Conservative	Chief Secretary for Ireland
Berwickshire	18 July 1916	Harold Tennant	Liberal	Harold Tennant	Liberal	Secretary for Scotland
Widnes	22 May 1916	William Walker	Conservative	William Walker	Conservative	Seeking re-election (Note: Walker owned a stud of thoroughbred horses. When he was given a contract to supply horses to the Army, questions were raised as to whether this contract disqualified him from the House of Commons, so Walker sought re-election in order to remove doubts as to his position.)
Dublin University	25 April 1916	James Campbell	Irish Unionist	James Campbell	Irish Unionist	Attorney-General for Ireland
Rotherham	26 January 1916	Jack Pease	Liberal	Jack Pease	Liberal	Postmaster General
Chesterton	20 January 1916	Edwin Samuel Montagu	Liberal	Edwin Samuel Montagu	Liberal	Chancellor of the Duchy of Lancaster
Cleveland	9 December 1915	Herbert Samuel	Liberal	Herbert Samuel	Liberal	Chancellor of the Duchy of Lancaster
St Helens	24 November 1915	Rigby Swift	Conservative	Rigby Swift	Conservative	Recorder of Wigan
Kingston	16 November 1915	George Cave	Conservative	George Cave	Conservative	Solicitor General for England and Wales
Carmarthen District	17 March 1915	W. Llewelyn Williams	Liberal	W. Llewelyn Williams	Liberal	Recorder of Cardiff
Saffron Walden	13 February 1915	Cecil Beck	Liberal	Cecil Beck	Liberal	Commissioner of the Treasury
Chesterton	13 February 1915	Edwin Samuel Montagu	Liberal	Edwin Samuel Montagu	Liberal	Chancellor of the Duchy of Lancaster
Scarborough	9 February 1915	Walter Rea	Liberal	Walter Rea	Liberal	Commissioner of the Treasury
Swansea District	13 August 1914	Sir David Brynmor Jones	Liberal	Sir David Brynmor Jones	Liberal	Recorder of Cardiff

=== 30th Parliament (December 1910 – July 1914) ===
By-election	Date	Incumbent	Party	Winner	Party	Position
East Fife	8 April 1914 (Note: Uncontested)	H. H. Asquith	Liberal	H. H. Asquith	Liberal	Secretary of State for War (Note: Seat vacated on appointment to the office noted.)
Bethnal Green South West	19 February 1914	Charles Masterman	Liberal	Mathew Wilson	Conservative	Chancellor of the Duchy of Lancaster
Wick District	8 December 1913	Robert Munro	Liberal	Robert Munro	Liberal	Lord Advocate
Keighley	11 November 1913	Sir Stanley Buckmaster	Liberal	Sir Stanley Buckmaster	Liberal	Solicitor General for England and Wales
Whitechapel	30 April 1913	Sir Stuart Samuel	Liberal	Sir Stuart Samuel	Liberal	Undertook a contract for the Public Service
Ilkeston	1 July 1912	J. E. B. Seely	Liberal	J. E. B. Seely	Liberal	Secretary of State for War
Forest of Dean	30 April 1912	Henry Webb	Liberal	Henry Webb	Liberal	Commissioner of the Treasury
Manchester South	5 March 1912	Sir Arthur Haworth	Liberal	Philip Glazebrook	Conservative	Commissioner of the Treasury
Glasgow St Rollox	26 February 1912	McKinnon Wood	Liberal	McKinnon Wood	Liberal	Secretary for Scotland
Carmarthen District	29 January 1912	W. Llewelyn Williams	Liberal	W. Llewelyn Williams	Liberal	Recorder of Swansea
North Ayrshire	20 December 1911	Andrew Anderson	Liberal	Duncan Campbell	Conservative	Solicitor General for Scotland
Bristol East	3 November 1911	Charles Hobhouse	Liberal	Charles Hobhouse	Liberal	Chancellor of the Duchy of Lancaster
Middleton	2 August 1911	Sir William Adkins	Liberal	Sir William Adkins	Liberal	Recorder of Nottingham
East Dorset	29 April 1911	Hon Frederick Guest	Liberal	Hon Frederick Guest	Liberal	Commissioner of the Treasury
Arfon	11 February 1911	William Jones	Liberal	William Jones	Liberal	Commissioner of the Treasury

=== 29th Parliament (January 1910 – December 1910) ===
By-election	Date	Incumbent	Party	Winner	Party	Position
Walthamstow	1 November 1910	John Simon	Liberal	Sir John Simon	Liberal	Solicitor General for England and Wales (Note: Seat vacated on appointment to the office noted.)
Govan	28 April 1910 (Note: Uncontested)	William Hunter	Liberal	William Hunter	Liberal	Solicitor General for Scotland
Reading	12 March 1910	Rufus Isaacs	Liberal	Rufus Isaacs	Liberal	Solicitor General for England and Wales
Shipley	10 March 1910	Percy Illingworth	Liberal	Percy Illingworth	Liberal	Commissioner of the Treasury
Barnstaple	2 March 1910	Ernest Soares	Liberal	Ernest Soares	Liberal	Commissioner of the Treasury
Tower Hamlets St George	1 March 1910	William Wedgwood Benn	Liberal	William Wedgwood Benn	Liberal	Commissioner of the Treasury
Swansea District	28 February 1910	Sir David Brynmor Jones	Liberal	Sir David Brynmor Jones	Liberal	Recorder of Merthyr Tydvil

=== 28th Parliament (1906 – January 1910) ===
By-election	Date	Incumbent	Party	Winner	Party	Position
High Peak	22 July 1909	Oswald Partington	Liberal	Oswald Partington	Liberal	Junior Lord of the Treasury (Note: Seat vacated on appointment to the office noted.)
Dumfries Burghs	20 July 1909	John Gulland	Liberal	John Gulland	Liberal	Junior Lord of the Treasury
Cleveland	9 July 1909	Herbert Samuel	Liberal	Herbert Samuel	Liberal	Chancellor of the Duchy of Lancaster
East Denbighshire	2 April 1909	Edward Hemmerde	Liberal	Edward Hemmerde	Liberal	Recorder of Liverpool
Edinburgh South	4 March 1909	Arthur Dewar	Liberal	Arthur Dewar	Liberal	Solicitor General for Scotland
Manchester North West	24 April 1908	Winston Churchill	Liberal	William Joynson-Hicks	Conservative	President of the Board of Trade
Dewsbury	23 April 1908	Walter Runciman	Liberal	Walter Runciman	Liberal	President of the Board of Education
West Carmarthenshire	26 February 1908 (Note: Uncontested)	John Lloyd Morgan	Liberal	John Lloyd Morgan	Liberal	Recorder of Swansea
Mid Glamorganshire	7 February 1908	Samuel Thomas Evans	Liberal	Samuel Thomas Evans	Liberal	Solicitor General for England and Wales
Anglesey	21 August 1907	Ellis Griffith	Liberal	Ellis Griffith	Liberal	Recorder of Birkenhead
Halifax	6 March 1907	John Henry Whitley	Liberal	John Henry Whitley	Liberal	Junior Lord of the Treasury
North Monmouthshire	19 February 1907	Reginald McKenna	Liberal	Reginald McKenna	Liberal	President of the Board of Education
Mid Glamorganshire	8 October 1906	Samuel Thomas Evans	Liberal	Samuel Thomas Evans	Liberal	Recorder of Swansea
Westbury	26 February 1906	John Fuller	Liberal	John Fuller	Liberal	Lord Commissioner of the Treasury

=== 27th Parliament (1900–1906) ===
By-election	Date	Incumbent	Party	Winner	Party	Position
Chichester	2 June 1905	Lord Edmund Talbot	Conservative	Lord Edmund Talbot	Conservative	Lord Commissioner of the Treasury (Note: Seat vacated on appointment to the office noted.)
Brighton (Note: Gain retained at the 1906 UK general election.)	5 April 1905	Gerald Loder	Conservative	Ernest Villiers	Liberal	Lord Commissioner of the Treasury
Chorley	4 November 1903	David Lindsay	Conservative	David Lindsay	Conservative	Lord Commissioner of the Treasury
Fareham	28 October 1903 (Note: Uncontested)	Arthur Lee	Conservative	Arthur Lee	Conservative	Civil Lord of the Admiralty
Westhoughton	24 October 1903	Edward Stanley	Conservative	Edward Stanley	Conservative	Postmaster General
Warwick and Leamington	23 October 1903	Alfred Lyttelton	Liberal Unionist	Alfred Lyttelton	Liberal Unionist	Secretary of State for the Colonies
Belfast West	23 October 1903	H. O. Arnold-Forster	Liberal Unionist	H. O. Arnold-Forster	Liberal Unionist	Secretary of State for War
Londonderry	8 October 1903	James Hamilton	Irish Unionist	James Hamilton	Irish Unionist	Treasurer of the Household
Sevenoaks	21 August 1902	Henry Forster	Conservative	Henry Forster	Conservative	Lord Commissioner of the Treasury
East Worcestershire	15 August 1902	Austen Chamberlain	Liberal Unionist	Austen Chamberlain	Liberal Unionist	Postmaster General
Tiverton	14 August 1902	William Walrond	Conservative	William Walrond	Conservative	Chancellor of the Duchy of Lancaster
West Derbyshire	11 December 1900	Victor Cavendish	Liberal Unionist	Victor Cavendish	Liberal Unionist	Treasurer of the Household
Woodbridge	10 December 1900	E. G. Pretyman	Conservative	E. G. Pretyman	Conservative	Civil Lord of the Admiralty
Wellington (Somerset)	10 December 1900	Alexander Acland-Hood	Conservative	Alexander Acland-Hood	Conservative	Vice-Chamberlain of the Household
Guildford	10 December 1900	St John Broderick	Conservative	St John Broderick	Conservative	Secretary of State for War
Preston	8 December 1900	Robert William Hanbury	Conservative	Robert William Hanbury	Conservative	President of the Board of Agriculture
Dover	8 December 1900	George Wyndham	Conservative	George Wyndham	Conservative	Chief Secretary for Ireland

=== 26th Parliament (1895–1900) ===
By-election	Date	Incumbent	Party	Winner	Party	Position
Dublin University	16 May 1900 (Note: Uncontested)	Edward Carson	Irish Unionist	Edward Carson	Irish Unionist	Solicitor General (Note: Seat vacated on appointment to the office noted.)
Oxford	4 November 1898	Arthur Annesley	Conservative	Arthur Annesley	Conservative	Comptroller of the Household
Mid Armagh	21 January 1898	Dunbar Barton	Irish Unionist	Dunbar Barton	Irish Unionist	Solicitor General for Ireland
Wycombe	21 February 1896	Richard Curzon	Conservative	Richard Curzon	Conservative	Treasurer of the Household
Harrow	30 November 1895	William Ambrose	Conservative	William Ambrose	Conservative	Attorney-General of the Duchy of Lancaster
Dublin St Stephen's Green	2 September 1895	William Kenny	Liberal Unionist	William Kenny	Liberal Unionist	Solicitor General for Ireland
Inverness Burghs	31 August 1895	Robert Finlay	Liberal Unionist	Robert Finlay	Liberal Unionist	Solicitor General

=== 25th Parliament (1892–1895) ===
By-election	Date	Incumbent	Party	Winner	Party	Position
Ealing	8 July 1895 (Note: Uncontested)	Lord George Hamilton	Conservative	Lord George Hamilton	Conservative	Secretary of State for India (Note: Seat vacated on appointment to office noted.)
Sleaford	6 July 1895	Henry Chaplin	Conservative	Henry Chaplin	Conservative	President of the Local Government Board
Blackpool	6 July 1895	Sir Matthew Ridley	Conservative	Sir Matthew Ridley	Conservative	Secretary of State for the Home Department
Croydon	5 July 1895	Charles Ritchie	Conservative	Charles Ritchie	Conservative	President of the Board of Trade
Manchester East	1 July 1895	Arthur Balfour	Conservative	Arthur Balfour	Conservative	First Lord of the Treasury
Bristol West	1 July 1895	Sir Michael Hicks Beach	Conservative	Sir Michael Hicks Beach	Conservative	Chancellor of the Exchequer
Birmingham West	1 July 1895	Joseph Chamberlain	Liberal Unionist	Joseph Chamberlain	Liberal Unionist	Secretary of State for the Colonies
St George's Hanover Square	29 June 1895	George Goschen	Conservative	George Goschen	Conservative	First Lord of the Admiralty
York	14 November 1894	Frank Lockwood	Liberal	Frank Lockwood	Liberal	Solicitor General for England and Wales
Dumfries Burghs	7 May 1894	Robert Reid	Liberal	Robert Reid	Liberal	Solicitor General for England and Wales
Wisbech	3 April 1894	Arthur Brand	Liberal	Arthur Brand	Liberal	Treasurer of the Household
Hawick Burghs	27 March 1894	Thomas Shaw	Liberal	Thomas Shaw	Liberal	Solicitor General for Scotland
Leith Burghs	26 March 1894	Ronald Munro-Ferguson	Liberal	Ronald Munro-Ferguson	Liberal	Lord Commissioner of the Treasury
Leeds West	16 March 1894	Herbert Gladstone	Liberal	Herbert Gladstone	Liberal	First Commissioner of Works
Accrington	21 December 1893	Joseph Leese	Liberal	Joseph Leese	Liberal	Recorder of Manchester
Cardiganshire	4 July 1893	William Bowen Rowlands	Liberal	William Bowen Rowlands	Liberal	Recorder of Swansea
Saffron Walden	19 September 1892	Herbert Gardner	Liberal	Herbert Gardner	Liberal	President of the Board of Agriculture
Dundee	9 September 1892	Edmund Robertson	Liberal	Edmund Robertson	Liberal	Civil Lord of the Admiralty
Merionethshire	26 August 1892	T. E. Ellis	Liberal	T. E. Ellis	Liberal	Lord Commissioner of the Treasury
East Fife	25 August 1892	H. H. Asquith	Liberal	H. H. Asquith	Liberal	Secretary of State for the Home Department
Clackmannanshire and Kinross-shire	25 August 1892	John Balfour	Liberal	John Balfour	Liberal	Lord Advocate
Stirling Burghs	25 August 1892	Henry Campbell-Bannerman	Liberal	Henry Campbell-Bannerman	Liberal	Secretary of State for War
Elgin Burghs	25 August 1892	Alexander Asher	Liberal	Alexander Asher	Liberal	Solicitor General for Scotland
Newcastle-upon-Tyne	25 August 1892	John Morley	Liberal	John Morley	Liberal	Chief Secretary for Ireland
Rotherham	25 August 1892	Arthur Dyke Acland	Liberal	Arthur Dyke Acland	Liberal	Vice President of the Committee of Council on Education
Forfarshire	24 August 1892	John Rigby	Liberal	John Rigby	Liberal	Solicitor General for England and Wales
Midlothian (or Edinburghshire)	24 August 1892	William Ewart Gladstone	Liberal	William Ewart Gladstone	Liberal	Prime Minister, First Lord of the Treasury, Lord Privy Seal
Glasgow Bridgeton	24 August 1892	Sir George Trevelyan	Liberal	Sir George Trevelyan	Liberal	Secretary for Scotland
Mid Northamptonshire	24 August 1892	Charles Spencer	Liberal	Charles Spencer	Liberal	Vice-Chamberlain of the Household
Nottingham East	24 August 1892	Arnold Morley	Liberal	Arnold Morley	Liberal	Postmaster General
Derby	24 August 1892	Sir William Vernon Harcourt	Liberal	Sir William Vernon Harcourt	Liberal	Chancellor of the Exchequer
Aberdeen South	23 August 1892	James Bryce	Liberal	James Bryce	Liberal	Chancellor of the Duchy of Lancaster
St Austell	23 August 1892	William Alexander McArthur	Liberal	William Alexander McArthur	Liberal	Lord Commissioner of the Treasury
Wolverhampton East	23 August 1892	Henry Fowler	Liberal	Henry Fowler	Liberal	President of the Local Government Board
Stoke-upon-Trent	23 August 1892	George Leveson-Gower	Liberal	George Leveson-Gower	Liberal	Comptroller of the Household
Sheffield Brightside	23 August 1892	A. J. Mundella	Liberal	A. J. Mundella	Liberal	President of the Board of Trade
Bradford Central	23 August 1892	George Shaw-Lefevre	Liberal	George Shaw-Lefevre	Liberal	First Commissioner of Works
Southwark West	23 August 1892	Richard Causton	Liberal	Richard Causton	Liberal	Lord Commissioner of the Treasury
Hackney South	23 August 1892	Sir Charles Russell	Liberal	Sir Charles Russell	Liberal	Attorney General for England and Wales

=== 24th Parliament (1886–1892) ===
By-election	Date	Incumbent	Party	Winner	Party	Position
Chichester	9 December 1891 (Note: Uncontested)	Lord Walter Gordon-Lennox	Conservative	Lord Walter Gordon-Lennox	Conservative	Treasurer of the Household (Note: Seat vacated on appointment to the office noted.)
Leeds North	23 November 1891	William Jackson	Conservative	William Jackson	Conservative	Chief Secretary for Ireland
Manchester North East	8 October 1891	Sir James Fergusson	Conservative	Sir James Fergusson	Conservative	Postmaster General
Strand	12 May 1891	William Henry Smith	Conservative	William Henry Smith	Conservative	Lord Warden of the Cinque Ports
Sleaford	26 September 1889	Henry Chaplin	Conservative	Henry Chaplin	Conservative	President of the Board of Agriculture
Bristol West	20 February 1888	Sir Michael Hicks Beach	Conservative	Sir Michael Hicks Beach	Conservative	President of the Board of Trade
Dublin University	3 February 1888	Dodgson Hamilton Madden	Irish Conservative	Dodgson Hamilton Madden	Irish Conservative	Solicitor General for Ireland
Dartford	2 February 1887	Sir William Hart Dyke	Conservative	Sir William Hart Dyke	Conservative	Vice President of the Committee of Council on Education
Blackpool	20 August 1886	Sir Frederick Stanley	Conservative	Sir Matthew Ridley	Conservative	President of the Board of Trade
North Northamptonshire	16 August 1886	Lord Burghley	Conservative	Lord Burghley	Conservative	Parliamentary Groom in Waiting
Newton	16 August 1886	Richard Assheton Cross	Conservative	Thomas Legh	Conservative	Secretary of State for India
Edinburgh and St Andrews Universities	13 August 1886	John Macdonald	Conservative	John Macdonald	Conservative	Lord Advocate
Cambridge University	13 August 1886	Henry Cecil Raikes	Conservative	Henry Cecil Raikes	Conservative	Postmaster General
Melton	13 August 1886	Lord John Manners	Conservative	Lord John Manners	Conservative	Chancellor of the Duchy of Lancaster
Dublin University	13 August 1886	David Plunket	Irish Conservative	David Plunket	Irish Conservative	First Commissioner of Works
Dublin University	13 August 1886	Hugh Holmes	Irish Conservative	Hugh Holmes	Irish Conservative	Attorney General for Ireland
West Down	13 August 1886	Lord Arthur Hill	Irish Conservative	Lord Arthur Hill	Irish Conservative	Comptroller of the Household
Wigtownshire	12 August 1886	Sir Herbert Maxwell	Conservative	Sir Herbert Maxwell	Conservative	Lord Commissioner of the Treasury
Buteshire	12 August 1886	James Robertson	Conservative	James Robertson	Conservative	Solicitor General for Scotland
Enfield	12 August 1886	William Pleydell-Bouverie	Conservative	William Pleydell-Bouverie	Conservative	Treasurer of the Household
Ealing	12 August 1886	Lord George Hamilton	Conservative	Lord George Hamilton	Conservative	First Lord of the Admiralty
Horncastle	12 August 1886	Edward Stanhope	Conservative	Edward Stanhope	Conservative	Secretary of State for the Colonies
Isle of Wight	12 August 1886	Sir Richard Webster	Conservative	Sir Richard Webster	Conservative	Attorney General for England and Wales
Tiverton	12 August 1886	William Walrond	Conservative	William Walrond	Conservative	Lord Commissioner of the Treasury
St George's, Tower Hamlets	12 August 1886	Charles Ritchie	Conservative	Charles Ritchie	Conservative	President of the Local Government Board
Sheffield Ecclesall	11 August 1886	Ellis Ashmead-Bartlett	Conservative	Ellis Ashmead-Bartlett	Conservative	Civil Lord of the Admiralty
Plymouth	11 August 1886	Edward Clarke	Conservative	Edward Clarke	Conservative	Solicitor General for England and Wales
Manchester East	11 August 1886	Arthur Balfour	Conservative	Arthur Balfour	Conservative	Secretary for Scotland
Liverpool Walton	11 August 1886	John George Gibson	Conservative	John George Gibson	Conservative	Solicitor General for Ireland
Croydon	11 August 1886	Sidney Herbert	Conservative	Sidney Herbert	Conservative	Lord Commissioner of the Treasury
Bristol West	11 August 1886	Sir Michael Hicks Beach	Conservative	Sir Michael Hicks Beach	Conservative	Chief Secretary for Ireland
Brighton	11 August 1886	William Thackeray Marriott	Conservative	William Thackeray Marriott	Conservative	Judge Advocate General
Birmingham East	11 August 1886	Henry Matthews	Conservative	Henry Matthews	Conservative	Secretary of State for the Home Department
Strand	11 August 1886	William Henry Smith	Conservative	William Henry Smith	Conservative	Secretary of State for War
Paddington South	11 August 1886	Lord Randolph Churchill	Conservative	Lord Randolph Churchill	Conservative	Chancellor of the Exchequer
Marylebone East	11 August 1886	Lord Charles Beresford	Conservative	Lord Charles Beresford	Conservative	Junior Naval Lord
Lewisham	11 August 1886	William Legge	Conservative	William Legge	Conservative	Vice-Chamberlain of the Household
Hampstead	11 August 1886	Sir Henry Holland	Conservative	Sir Henry Holland	Conservative	Vice President of the Committee of Council on Education

=== 23rd Parliament (1885–1886) ===
By-election	Date	Incumbent	Party	Winner	Party	Position
Clitheroe	19 April 1886 (Note: Uncontested)	Ughtred Kay-Shuttleworth	Liberal	Ughtred Kay-Shuttleworth	Liberal	Chancellor of the Duchy of Lancaster (Note: Seat vacated on appointment to the office noted.)
Halifax	3 April 1886	Sir James Stansfeld	Liberal	Sir James Stansfeld	Liberal	President of the Local Government Board
Cardiff Boroughs	27 February 1886	Sir Edward James Reed	Liberal	Sir Edward James Reed	Liberal	Junior Lord of the Treasury
South Somerset	24 February 1886	Frederick Lambart	Liberal	Frederick Lambart	Liberal	Vice-Chamberlain of the Household
Grantham	23 February 1886	John William Mellor	Liberal	John William Mellor	Liberal	Judge Advocate General
Clackmannanshire and Kinross-shire	13 February 1886	John Balfour	Liberal	John Balfour	Liberal	Lord Advocate
Berwickshire	13 February 1886	Edward Marjoribanks	Liberal	Edward Marjoribanks	Liberal	Comptroller of the Household
Banffshire	13 February 1886	Robert Duff	Liberal	Robert Duff	Liberal	Civil Lord of the Admiralty
Luton	13 February 1886	Cyril Flower	Liberal	Cyril Flower	Liberal	Junior Lord of the Treasury
Great Grimsby	13 February 1886	Edward Heneage	Liberal	Edward Heneage	Liberal	Chancellor of the Duchy of Lancaster
Elgin Burghs	12 February 1886	Alexander Asher	Liberal	Alexander Asher	Liberal	Solicitor General for Scotland
North West Staffordshire	12 February 1886	George Leveson-Gower	Liberal	George Leveson-Gower	Liberal	Junior Lord of the Treasury
Mid Northamptonshire	12 February 1886	Charles Spencer	Liberal	Charles Spencer	Liberal	Parliamentary Groom in Waiting
Newcastle-upon-Tyne	12 February 1886	John Morley	Liberal	John Morley	Liberal	Chief Secretary for Ireland
Leeds South	12 February 1886	Sir Lyon Playfair	Liberal	Sir Lyon Playfair	Liberal	Vice President of the Committee of Council on Education
Hackney South	11 February 1886	Charles Russell	Liberal	Charles Russell	Liberal	Attorney General for England and Wales
Hawick Burghs	10 February 1886	George Trevelyan	Liberal	George Trevelyan	Liberal	Secretary for Scotland
Midlothian	10 February 1886	William Ewart Gladstone	Liberal	William Ewart Gladstone	Liberal	Prime Minister, First Lord of the Treasury, Lord Privy Seal
Stirling Burghs	10 February 1886	Henry Campbell-Bannerman	Liberal	Henry Campbell-Bannerman	Liberal	Secretary of State for War
Birmingham West	9 February 1886	Joseph Chamberlain	Liberal	Joseph Chamberlain	Liberal	President of the Local Government Board
Derby	9 February 1886	Sir William Vernon Harcourt	Liberal	Sir William Vernon Harcourt	Liberal	Chancellor of the Exchequer
Edinburgh South	9 February 1886	Hugh Childers	Liberal	Hugh Childers	Liberal	Secretary of State for the Home Department
Sheffield Brightside	9 February 1886	A. J. Mundella	Liberal	A. J. Mundella	Liberal	President of the Board of Trade

=== 22nd Parliament (1880–1885) ===
By-election	Date	Former incumbent	Party	Winner	Party	Position
Horsham	16 July 1885 (Note: Uncontested)	Sir Henry Fletcher	Conservative	Sir Henry Fletcher	Conservative	Groom in Waiting (Note: Seat vacated on appointment to the office noted.)
Chatham	11 July 1885	John Eldon Gorst	Conservative	Sir John Eldon Gorst	Conservative	Solicitor General for England and Wales
Brighton	10 July 1885	William Thackeray Marriott	Conservative	William Thackeray Marriott	Conservative	Judge Advocate General
County Down	8 July 1885	Lord Arthur Hill	Conservative	Lord Arthur Hill	Conservative	Comptroller of the Household
West Kent	6 July 1885	William Legge	Conservative	William Legge	Conservative	Vice-Chamberlain of the Household
East Devon	4 July 1885	William Walrond	Conservative	William Walrond	Conservative	Lord Commissioner of the Treasury
Bute	3 July 1885	Charles Dalrymple	Conservative	Charles Dalrymple	Conservative	Lord Commissioner of the Treasury
South Wiltshire	3 July 1885	William Pleydell-Bouverie	Conservative	William Pleydell-Bouverie	Conservative	Treasurer of the Household
Middlesex	3 July 1885	Lord George Hamilton	Conservative	Lord George Hamilton	Conservative	First Lord of the Admiralty
Woodstock	3 July 1885	Lord Randolph Churchill	Conservative	Lord Randolph Churchill	Conservative	Secretary of State for India
North Leicestershire	2 July 1885	Lord John Manners	Conservative	Lord John Manners	Conservative	Postmaster General
North Lancashire	2 July 1885	Frederick Stanley	Conservative	Frederick Stanley	Conservative	Secretary of State for the Colonies
Mid Kent	2 July 1885	Sir William Hart Dyke	Conservative	Sir William Hart Dyke	Conservative	Chief Secretary for Ireland
Wilton	2 July 1885	Sidney Herbert	Conservative	Sidney Herbert	Conservative	Lord Commissioner of the Treasury
Dublin University	1 July 1885	David Plunket	Conservative	David Plunket	Conservative	First Commissioner of Works
Mid Lincolnshire	1 July 1885	Henry Chaplin	Conservative	Henry Chaplin	Conservative	Chancellor of the Duchy of Lancaster
Mid Lincolnshire	1 July 1885	Edward Stanhope	Conservative	Edward Stanhope	Conservative	President of the Board of Trade
South West Lancashire	1 July 1885	R. A. Cross	Conservative	R. A. Cross	Conservative	Home Secretary
East Gloucestershire	1 July 1885	Sir Michael Hicks-Beach	Conservative	Sir Michael Hicks-Beach	Conservative	Chancellor of the Exchequer
Eye	1 July 1885	Ellis Ashmead-Bartlett	Conservative	Ellis Ashmead-Bartlett	Conservative	Civil Lord of the Admiralty
Hertford	30 June 1885	Arthur Balfour	Conservative	Arthur Balfour	Conservative	President of the Local Government Board
Westminster	29 June 1885	William Henry Smith	Conservative	William Henry Smith	Conservative	Secretary of State for War
Scarborough	26 November 1884	William Sproston Caine	Liberal	William Sproston Caine	Liberal	Civil Lord of the Admiralty
Stirling Burghs	31 October 1884	Henry Campbell-Bannerman	Liberal	Henry Campbell-Bannerman	Liberal	Chief Secretary for Ireland
Chelsea	11 January 1883	Sir Charles Dilke	Liberal	Sir Charles Dilke	Liberal	President of the Local Government Board
Salisbury	20 November 1882 (Note: Gain not retained at the 1885 general election.)	William Grenfell	Liberal	Coleridge Kennard	Conservative	Groom in Waiting
Banffshire	19 June 1882	Robert Duff	Liberal	Robert Duff	Liberal	Lord Commissioner of the Treasury
Hawick Burghs	18 May 1882	George Trevelyan	Liberal	George Trevelyan	Liberal	Chief Secretary for Ireland
Northern West Riding of Yorkshire	18 May 1882	Lord Frederick Cavendish	Liberal	Isaac Holden	Liberal	Chief Secretary for Ireland (Note: Former MP assassinated after the writ was moved.)
Elgin Burghs	27 August 1881	Alexander Asher	Liberal	Alexander Asher	Liberal	Solicitor General for Scotland
Leeds	24 August 1881	Herbert Gladstone	Liberal	Herbert Gladstone	Liberal	Lord Commissioner of the Treasury
Reading	15 December 1880	George Shaw-Lefevre	Liberal	George Shaw-Lefevre	Liberal	First Commissioner of Works and Public Buildings
Wycombe	26 May 1880	William Carington	Liberal	William Carington	Liberal	Groom in Waiting
County Londonderry	21 May 1880	Hugh Law	Liberal	Hugh Law	Liberal	Attorney General for Ireland
Wigtown Burghs	18 May 1880 (Note: Constituency abolished November 1885, so gain was not retained.)	John McLaren	Liberal	Mark Stewart	Conservative	Lord Advocate
Mallow	17 May 1880	William Moore Johnson	Liberal	William Moore Johnson	Liberal	Solicitor General for Ireland
North East Lancashire	17 May 1880	Spencer Cavendish	Liberal	Spencer Cavendish	Liberal	Secretary of State for India
Clackmannanshire and Kinross-shire	14 May 1880	William Patrick Adam	Liberal	William Patrick Adam	Liberal	First Commissioner of Works
Denbighshire	14 May 1880	George Osborne Morgan	Liberal	George Osborne Morgan	Liberal	Judge Advocate General
Haverfordwest Boroughs	12 May 1880	William Edwardes	Liberal	William Edwardes	Liberal	Comptroller of the Household
Midlothian	10 May 1880	William Ewart Gladstone	Liberal	William Ewart Gladstone	Liberal	Prime Minister, First Lord of the Treasury and Chancellor of the Exchequer
Shrewsbury	10 May 1880	Charles Cecil Cotes	Liberal	Charles Cecil Cotes	Liberal	Lord Commissioner of the Treasury
Hastings	10 May 1880	Thomas Brassey	Liberal	Thomas Brassey	Liberal	Civil Lord of the Admiralty
Durham City	10 May 1880	Farrer Herschell	Liberal	Farrer Herschell	Liberal	Solicitor General for England and Wales
Taunton	8 May 1880	Sir Henry James	Liberal	Sir Henry James	Liberal	Attorney General for England and Wales
Sheffield	8 May 1880	A. J. Mundella	Liberal	A. J. Mundella	Liberal	Vice-President of the Committee of the Council on Education
Pontefract	8 May 1880	Hugh Childers	Liberal	Hugh Childers	Liberal	Secretary of State for War
Oxford	8 May 1880 (Note: By-election voided and writ suspended)	William Vernon Harcourt	Liberal	Alexander William Hall	Conservative	Home Secretary
Marlborough	8 May 1880	Lord Charles Bruce	Liberal	Lord Charles Bruce	Liberal	Vice-Chamberlain of the Household
Chester	8 May 1880	John George Dodson	Liberal	John George Dodson	Liberal	President of the Local Government Board
Bradford	8 May 1880	William Edward Forster	Liberal	William Edward Forster	Liberal	Chief Secretary for Ireland
Birmingham	8 May 1880	John Bright	Liberal	John Bright	Liberal	Chancellor of the Duchy of Lancaster
Birmingham	8 May 1880	Joseph Chamberlain	Liberal	Joseph Chamberlain	Liberal	President of the Board of Trade
Bath	8 May 1880	Sir Arthur Hayter	Liberal	Sir Arthur Hayter	Liberal	Lord Commissioner of the Treasury
Hackney	7 May 1880	Henry Fawcett	Liberal	Henry Fawcett	Liberal	Postmaster General
Hackney	7 May 1880	John Holms	Liberal	John Holms	Liberal	Lord Commissioner of the Treasury

=== 21st Parliament (1874–1880) ===
By-election	Date	Former incumbent	Party	Winner	Party	Position
South Warwickshire	21 February 1879 (Note: Uncontested)	Hugh Seymour	Conservative	Hugh Seymour	Conservative	Comptroller of the Household (Note: Seat vacated on appointment to the office noted.)
Middlesex	12 April 1878	Lord George Hamilton	Conservative	Lord George Hamilton	Conservative	Vice-President of the Committee of the Council on Education
North Lancashire	8 April 1878	Frederick Stanley	Conservative	Frederick Stanley	Conservative	Secretary of State for War
York	20 February 1878	James Lowther	Conservative	James Lowther	Conservative	Chief Secretary for Ireland
Westminster	11 August 1877	William Henry Smith	Conservative	William Henry Smith	Conservative	First Lord of the Admiralty
Dublin University	13 February 1877	Edward Gibson	Conservative	Edward Gibson	Conservative	Attorney-General for Ireland
Rutlandshire	17 August 1876	Gerard Noel	Conservative	Gerard Noel	Conservative	First Commissioner of Works
Enniskillen	15 February 1876	John Crichton	Conservative	John Crichton	Conservative	Lord Commissioner of the Treasury
South Wiltshire	4 January 1876	Lord Henry Thynne	Conservative	Lord Henry Thynne	Conservative	Treasurer of the Household
Whitehaven	16 December 1875	George Cavendish-Bentinck	Conservative	George Cavendish-Bentinck	Conservative	Judge Advocate General
Dublin University	11 February 1875	David Robert Plunket	Conservative	David Robert Plunket	Conservative	Solicitor General for Ireland
Preston	24 April 1874	John Holker	Conservative	John Holker	Conservative	Solicitor General for England and Wales
Falkirk Burghs	26 March 1874	John Ramsay	Liberal	John Ramsay	Liberal	Disqualification (Held Government Contract)
North Staffordshire	23 March 1874	Charles Adderley	Conservative	Charles Adderley	Conservative	President of the Board of Trade
East Suffolk	20 March 1874	The Lord Rendlesham	Conservative	The Lord Rendlesham	Conservative	Lord Commissioner of the Treasury
North Leicestershire	20 March 1874	Lord John Manners	Conservative	Lord John Manners	Conservative	Postmaster General
Invernesshire	19 March 1874	Donald Cameron	Conservative	Donald Cameron	Conservative	Parliamentary Groom in Waiting
South West Lancashire	19 March 1874	R. A. Cross	Conservative	R. A. Cross	Conservative	Home Secretary
South Devonshire	19 March 1874	Sir Massey Lopes	Conservative	Sir Massey Lopes	Conservative	Civil Lord of the Admiralty
County Dublin	18 March 1874	Thomas Edward Taylor	Conservative	Thomas Edward Taylor	Conservative	Chancellor of the Duchy of Lancaster
North Devonshire	18 March 1874	Sir Stafford Northcote	Conservative	Sir Stafford Northcote	Conservative	Chancellor of the Exchequer
North Northamptonshire	18 March 1874	George Ward Hunt	Conservative	George Ward Hunt	Conservative	First Lord of the Admiralty
North Northumberland	17 March 1874	Earl Percy	Conservative	Earl Percy	Conservative	Treasurer of the Household
Monmouthshire	17 March 1874	Lord Henry Somerset	Conservative	Lord Henry Somerset	Conservative	Comptroller of the Household
East Gloucestershire	17 March 1874	Michael Hicks Beach	Conservative	Michael Hicks Beach	Conservative	Chief Secretary for Ireland
Buckinghamshire	17 March 1874	Benjamin Disraeli	Conservative	Benjamin Disraeli	Conservative	Prime Minister and First Lord of the Treasury
Eye	17 March 1874	George Barrington	Conservative	George Barrington	Conservative	Vice-Chamberlain of the Household
Dublin University	16 March 1874	John Thomas Ball	Conservative	John Thomas Ball	Conservative	Attorney General for Ireland
Mid Surrey	16 March 1874	Richard Baggallay	Conservative	Richard Baggallay	Conservative	Solicitor General for England and Wales
Portsmouth	16 March 1874	James Dalrymple-Horn-Elphinstone	Conservative	James Dalrymple-Horn-Elphinstone	Conservative	Lord Commissioner of the Treasury
North Lincolnshire	16 March 1874	Rowland Winn	Conservative	Rowland Winn	Conservative	Lord Commissioner of the Treasury
Huntingdon	16 March 1874	John Burgess Karslake	Conservative	John Burgess Karslake	Conservative	Attorney General for England and Wales
Glasgow and Aberdeen Universities	14 March 1874	Edward Gordon	Conservative	Edward Gordon	Conservative	Lord Advocate
North Hampshire	14 March 1874	George Sclater-Booth	Conservative	George Sclater-Booth	Conservative	President of the Local Government Board
Liverpool	14 March 1874	Dudley Ryder	Conservative	Dudley Ryder	Conservative	Vice-President of the Committee of the Council on Education
Oxford University	14 March 1874	Gathorne Hardy	Conservative	Gathorne Hardy	Conservative	Secretary of State for War
New Shoreham	13 March 1874	Stephen Cave	Conservative	Stephen Cave	Conservative	Judge Advocate General
Chichester	13 March 1874	Lord Henry Lennox	Conservative	Lord Henry Lennox	Conservative	First Commissioner of Works

=== 20th Parliament (1868–1874) ===
By-election	Date	Former incumbent	Party	Winner	Party	Position
Oxford	6 December 1873 (Note: Uncontested)	William Vernon Harcourt	Liberal	William Vernon Harcourt	Liberal	Solicitor General for England and Wales (Note: Seat vacated on appointment to the office noted.)
Edinburgh and St. Andrews Universities	4 December 1873	Lyon Playfair	Liberal	Lyon Playfair	Liberal	Postmaster General
Haverfordwest Boroughs	24 November 1873	William Edwardes	Liberal	William Edwardes	Liberal	Parliamentary Groom in Waiting
Birmingham	20 October 1873	John Bright	Liberal	John Bright	Liberal	Chancellor of the Duchy of Lancaster
Taunton	13 October 1873	Henry James	Liberal	Henry James	Liberal	Solicitor General for England and Wales
Northern West Riding of Yorkshire	27 August 1873	Lord Frederick Cavendish	Liberal	Lord Frederick Cavendish	Liberal	Lord Commissioner of the Treasury
Pontefract	15 August 1872 (Note: First election using the secret ballot.)	Hugh Childers	Liberal	Hugh Childers	Liberal	Chancellor of the Duchy of Lancaster and Paymaster General
Flintshire	2 March 1872	Lord Richard Grosvenor	Liberal	Lord Richard Grosvenor	Liberal	Vice-Chamberlain of the Household
Dover	25 November 1871	George Jessel	Liberal	George Jessel	Liberal	Solicitor General for England and Wales
Halifax	13 March 1871	James Stansfeld	Liberal	James Stansfeld	Liberal	President of the Poor Law Board
County Limerick	28 January 1871	William Monsell	Liberal	William Monsell	Liberal	Postmaster General
Durham City	14 January 1871	John Robert Davison	Liberal	John Robert Davison	Liberal	Judge Advocate General
Plymouth	15 August 1870	Sir Robert Collier	Liberal	Sir Robert Collier	Liberal	Recorder of Bristol
Londonderry City	15 February 1870	Richard Dowse	Liberal	Richard Dowse	Liberal	Solicitor General for Ireland
Whitby	18 November 1869	William Henry Gladstone	Liberal	William Henry Gladstone	Liberal	Lord Commissioner of the Treasury
Tower Hamlets	8 November 1869	Acton Smee Ayrton	Liberal	Acton Smee Ayrton	Liberal	First Commissioner of Works and Public Buildings
County Louth	11 January 1869	Chichester Fortescue	Liberal	Chichester Fortescue	Liberal	Chief Secretary for Ireland
Kildare	11 January 1869	Lord Otho Fitzgerald	Liberal	Lord Otho Fitzgerald	Liberal	Comptroller of the Household
Westmeath	7 January 1869	Algernon Greville	Liberal	Algernon Greville	Liberal	Parliamentary Groom in Waiting
Kerry	7 January 1869	Valentine Browne	Liberal	Valentine Browne	Liberal	Vice-Chamberlain of the Household
Clackmannanshire and Kinross-shire	6 January 1869	William Patrick Adam	Liberal	William Patrick Adam	Liberal	Lord Commissioner of the Treasury
Clare	5 January 1869	Sir Colman O'Loghlen	Liberal	Sir Colman O'Loghlen	Liberal	Judge Advocate General
Mallow	4 January 1869	Edward Sullivan	Liberal	Edward Sullivan	Liberal	Attorney General for Ireland
Wigtown Burghs	4 January 1869	George Young	Liberal	George Young	Liberal	Solicitor General for Scotland
Hawick Burghs	4 January 1869	George Trevelyan	Liberal	George Trevelyan	Liberal	Civil Lord of the Admiralty
Oxford	22 December 1868	Edward Cardwell	Liberal	Edward Cardwell	Liberal	Secretary of State for War
London University	21 December 1868	Robert Lowe	Liberal	Robert Lowe	Liberal	Chancellor of the Exchequer
Truro	21 December 1868	John Cranch Walker Vivian	Liberal	John Cranch Walker Vivian	Liberal	Lord Commissioner of the Treasury
Ripon	21 December 1868	Lord John Hay	Liberal	Lord John Hay	Liberal	Junior Naval Lord
Pontefract	21 December 1868	Hugh Childers	Liberal	Hugh Childers	Liberal	First Lord of the Admiralty
Plymouth	21 December 1868	Sir Robert Collier	Liberal	Sir Robert Collier	Liberal	Attorney General for England and Wales
Halifax	21 December 1868	James Stansfeld	Liberal	James Stansfeld	Liberal	Lord Commissioner of the Treasury
Exeter	21 December 1868	John Coleridge	Liberal	Sir John Coleridge	Liberal	Solicitor General for England and Wales
Bradford	21 December 1868	William Edward Forster	Liberal	William Edward Forster	Liberal	Vice President of the Committee of Council on Education
Birmingham	21 December 1868	John Bright	Liberal	John Bright	Liberal	President of the Board of Trade
Southwark	21 December 1868	Austen Henry Layard	Liberal	Austen Henry Layard	Liberal	First Commissioner of Works
Greenwich	21 December 1868	William Ewart Gladstone	Liberal	William Ewart Gladstone	Liberal	Prime Minister and First Lord of the Treasury
City of London	21 December 1868	George Goschen	Liberal	George Goschen	Liberal	President of the Poor Law Board

=== 19th Parliament (1865–1868) ===
By-election	Date	Former incumbent	Party	Winner	Party	Position
North Northamptonshire	7 March 1868 (Note: Uncontested)	George Ward Hunt	Conservative	George Ward Hunt	Conservative	Chancellor of the Exchequer (Note: Seat vacated on appointment to the office noted.)
Helston	19 February 1868	William Brett	Conservative	William Brett	Conservative	Solicitor General for England and Wales
Andover	22 July 1867	John Burgess Karslake	Conservative	John Burgess Karslake	Conservative	Attorney General for England and Wales
Cambridge University	22 July 1867	Charles Jasper Selwyn	Conservative	Charles Jasper Selwyn	Conservative	Solicitor General for England and Wales
North Lancashire	1 July 1867	John Wilson-Patten	Conservative	John Wilson-Patten	Conservative	Chancellor of the Duchy of Lancaster
Oxford University	20 May 1867	Gathorne Hardy	Conservative	Gathorne Hardy	Conservative	Home Secretary
Dublin University	30 March 1867	Hedges Eyre Chatterton	Conservative	Hedges Eyre Chatterton	Conservative	Attorney-General for Ireland
Huntingdonshire	25 March 1867	Lord Robert Montagu	Conservative	Lord Robert Montagu	Conservative	Vice-President of the Committee on Education
Tyrone	21 March 1867	Henry Lowry-Corry	Conservative	Henry Lowry-Corry	Conservative	First Lord of the Admiralty
North Devon	18 March 1867	Stafford Northcote	Conservative	Stafford Northcote	Conservative	Secretary of State for India
Droitwich	13 March 1867	John Pakington	Conservative	John Pakington	Conservative	Secretary of State for War
South Shropshire	8 March 1867	Percy Egerton Herbert	Conservative	Percy Egerton Herbert	Conservative	Treasurer of the Household
Galway Borough	12 February 1867	Michael Morris	Conservative	Michael Morris	Conservative	Attorney General for Ireland
West Gloucestershire	15 November 1866	John Rolt	Conservative	John Rolt	Conservative	Attorney General for England and Wales
Abingdon	6 August 1866	Charles Lindsay	Conservative	Charles Lindsay	Conservative	Groom in Waiting
Galway Borough	2 August 1866	Michael Morris	Liberal	Michael Morris	Conservative	Solicitor General for Ireland
Peeblesshire	24 July 1866	Graham Graham-Montgomery	Conservative	Graham Graham-Montgomery	Conservative	Lord Commissioner of the Treasury
Bridgnorth	21 July 1866	Henry Whitmore	Conservative	Henry Whitmore	Conservative	Lord Commissioner of the Treasury
Tyrone	20 July 1866	Lord Claud Hamilton	Conservative	Lord Claud Hamilton	Conservative	Vice-Chamberlain of the Household
Tyrone	18 July 1866	Henry Lowry-Corry	Conservative	Henry Lowry-Corry	Conservative	Vice-President of the Committee of the Council on Education
Cambridgeshire	17 July 1866	Viscount Royston	Conservative	Viscount Royston	Conservative	Comptroller of the Household
Antrim	17 July 1866	George Henry Seymour	Conservative	George Henry Seymour	Conservative	Third Naval Lord
North Essex	16 July 1866	Charles Du Cane	Conservative	Charles Du Cane	Conservative	Civil Lord of the Admiralty
Rutlandshire	14 July 1866	Gerard Noel	Conservative	Gerard Noel	Conservative	Lord Commissioner of the Treasury
North Northamptonshire	14 July 1866	William Cecil	Conservative	William Cecil	Conservative	Treasurer of the Household
North Leicestershire	14 July 1866	Lord John Manners	Conservative	Lord John Manners	Conservative	First Commissioner of Works
North Devon	14 July 1866	Stafford Northcote	Conservative	Stafford Northcote	Conservative	President of the Board of Trade
New Shoreham	14 July 1866	Stephen Cave	Conservative	Stephen Cave	Conservative	Paymaster General and Vice-President of the Board of Trade
Belfast	13 July 1866	Hugh Cairns	Conservative	Hugh Cairns	Conservative	Attorney General for England and Wales
Buckinghamshire	13 July 1866	Benjamin Disraeli	Conservative	Benjamin Disraeli	Conservative	Chancellor of the Exchequer
Oxford University	12 July 1866	Gathorne Hardy	Conservative	Gathorne Hardy	Conservative	President of the Poor Law Board
Stamford	12 July 1866	Robert Cecil	Conservative	Robert Cecil	Conservative	Secretary of State for India
Stamford	12 July 1866	Sir John Dalrymple-Hay	Conservative	Sir John Dalrymple-Hay	Conservative	Fourth Naval Lord
Bridgewater	12 July 1866	George Patton	Conservative	Philip Vanderbyl	Liberal	Lord Advocate
Cambridge University	11 July 1866	Spencer Horatio Walpole	Conservative	Spencer Horatio Walpole	Conservative	Home Secretary
King's Lynn	11 July 1866	Lord Stanley	Conservative	Lord Stanley	Conservative	Foreign Secretary
Huntingdon	11 July 1866	Jonathan Peel	Conservative	Jonathan Peel	Conservative	Secretary of State for War
Guildford	11 July 1866	William Bovill	Conservative	William Bovill	Conservative	Solicitor General for England and Wales
Durham	11 July 1866	John Mowbray	Conservative	John Mowbray	Conservative	Judge Advocate General
Droitwich	11 July 1866	John Pakington	Conservative	John Pakington	Conservative	First Lord of the Admiralty
Cockermouth	11 July 1866	Lord Naas	Conservative	Lord Naas	Conservative	Chief Secretary for Ireland
County Waterford	7 June 1866	John Esmonde	Liberal	John Esmonde	Liberal	Lord Commissioner of the Treasury
Winchester	4 June 1866	John Bonham-Carter	Liberal	John Bonham-Carter	Liberal	Lord Commissioner of the Treasury
Kildare	21 May 1866	Lord Otho FitzGerald	Liberal	Lord Otho FitzGerald	Liberal	Treasurer of the Household
Reading	5 May 1866	George Shaw-Lefevre	Liberal	George Shaw-Lefevre	Liberal	Civil Lord of the Admiralty
Ripon	28 March 1866	Lord John Hay	Liberal	Lord John Hay	Liberal	Fifth Naval Lord
County Louth	22 March 1866	Chichester Parkinson-Fortescue	Liberal	Chichester Parkinson-Fortescue	Liberal	Chief Secretary for Ireland
County Limerick	1 March 1866	William Monsell	Liberal	William Monsell	Liberal	Vice-President of the Board of Trade and Paymaster General
North Lancashire	28 February 1866	Spender Cavendish	Liberal	Spender Cavendish	Liberal	Secretary of State for War
Sunderland	28 February 1866	Henry Fenwick	Liberal	John Candlish	Liberal	Civil Lord of the Admiralty
City of London	26 February 1866	George Goschen	Liberal	George Goschen	Liberal	Chancellor of the Duchy of Lancaster

=== 18th Parliament (1859–1865) ===
By-election	Date	Former incumbent	Party	Winner	Party	Position
Clackmannanshire and Kinross-shire	20 April 1865 (Note: Uncontested)	William Patrick Adam	Liberal	William Patrick Adam	Liberal	Lord of the Treasury (Note: Seat vacated on appointment to the office noted.)
Gloucester	25 May 1864	John Joseph Powell	Liberal	John Joseph Powell	Liberal	Recorder of Wolverhampton
Merthyr Tydfil	25 April 1864	Henry Bruce	Liberal	Henry Bruce	Liberal	Vice-President of the Committee on Education
Pontefract	20 April 1864	Hugh Childers	Liberal	Hugh Childers	Liberal	Civil Lord of the Admiralty
Oxford	9 April 1864	Edward Cardwell	Liberal	Edward Cardwell	Liberal	Secretary of State for the Colonies
Richmond	17 October 1863	Roundell Palmer	Liberal	Roundell Palmer	Liberal	Attorney General for England and Wales
Plymouth	17 October 1863	Robert Collier	Liberal	Robert Collier	Liberal	Solicitor General for England and Wales
Halifax	28 April 1863	James Stansfeld	Liberal	James Stansfeld	Liberal	Civil Lord of the Admiralty
North Lancashire	24 March 1863	Spencer Cavendish	Liberal	Spencer Cavendish	Liberal	Civil Lord of the Admiralty
Longford	7 March 1862	Luke White	Liberal	Myles William O'Reilly	Liberal	Lord of the Treasury
Tamworth	31 July 1861	Robert Peel	Liberal	Robert Peel	Liberal	Chief Secretary for Ireland
Morpeth	31 July 1861	George Grey	Liberal	George Grey	Liberal	Home Secretary
Oxford	30 July 1861	Edward Cardwell	Liberal	Edward Cardwell	Liberal	Chancellor of the Duchy of Lancaster
Durham City	8 July 1861	William Atherton	Liberal	William Atherton	Liberal	Attorney General for England and Wales
Southwark	24 April 1861	John Locke	Liberal	John Locke	Liberal	Recorder of Brighton
Tiverton	28 March 1861	Henry John Temple	Liberal	Henry John Temple	Liberal	Lord Warden of the Cinque Ports
County Cork	5 March 1860	Rickard Deasy	Liberal	Rickard Deasy	Liberal	Attorney General for Ireland
Hertford	13 February 1860	William Cowper	Liberal	William Cowper	Liberal	First Commissioner of Works
Gateshead	13 February 1860	William Hutt	Liberal	William Hutt	Liberal	Vice-President of the Board of Trade and Paymaster General
Liskeard	9 January 1860	William Atherton	Liberal	William Atherton	Liberal	Solicitor General for England and Wales
Hertford	18 August 1859	William Cowper	Liberal	William Cowper	Liberal	Vice-President of the Board of Trade and Paymaster General
County Wicklow	18 July 1859	Lord Proby	Liberal	Lord Proby	Liberal	Comptroller of the Household
Wolverhampton	9 July 1859	Charles Pelham Villiers	Liberal	Charles Pelham Villiers	Liberal	President of the Poor Law Board
Ashton-under-Lyne	9 July 1859	Thomas Milner Gibson	Liberal	Thomas Milner Gibson	Liberal	President of the Board of Trade
West Gloucestershire	7 July 1859	Robert Kingscote	Liberal	Robert Kingscote	Liberal	Groom in Waiting
Lichfield	6 July 1859	Lord Alfred Paget	Liberal	Lord Alfred Paget	Liberal	Chief Equerry and Clerk Marshal
Kerry	5 July 1859	Valentine Browne	Liberal	Valentine Browne	Liberal	Vice-Chamberlain of the Household (Note: According to the writ of election the by-election cause was Castlerosse being appointed Treasurer of the Household. However according to the London Gazette he does not appear to have actually been appointed to that office but was instead appointed Vice-Chamberlain of the Household.)
County Cork	5 July 1859	Rickard Deasy	Liberal	Rickard Deasy	Liberal	Solicitor General for Ireland
Oxford University	1 July 1859	William Ewart Gladstone	Peelite	William Ewart Gladstone	Liberal	Chancellor of the Exchequer
Clonmel	1 July 1859	John Bagwell	Liberal	John Bagwell	Liberal	Lord Commissioner of the Treasury
Ennis	29 June 1859	John FitzGerald	Liberal	John FitzGerald	Liberal	Attorney General for Ireland
South Wiltshire	29 June 1859	Sidney Herbert	Liberal	Sidney Herbert	Liberal	Secretary of State for War and Secretary at War
Edinburgh	28 June 1859	James Moncreiff	Liberal	James Moncreiff	Liberal	Lord Advocate
Sandwich	28 June 1859	Edward Knatchbull-Hugessen	Liberal	Edward Knatchbull-Hugessen	Liberal	Lord Commissioner of the Treasury
Norwich	28 June 1859	William Keppel	Liberal	William Keppel	Liberal	Treasurer of the Household (Note: According to the writ of election the by-election cause was Bury being appointed Comptroller of the Household. However according to the London Gazette he does not appear to have actually been appointed to that office but was instead appointed Treasurer of the Household.)
Newcastle upon Tyne	28 June 1859	Thomas Emerson Headlam	Liberal	Thomas Emerson Headlam	Liberal	Judge Advocate General
Halifax	28 June 1859	Charles Wood	Liberal	Charles Wood	Liberal	Secretary of State for India
Bedford	28 June 1859	Samuel Whitbread	Liberal	Samuel Whitbread	Liberal	Civil Lord of the Admiralty
Wigtown Burghs	27 June 1859	William Dunbar	Liberal	William Dunbar	Liberal	Lord Commissioner of the Treasury
Radnor Boroughs	27 June 1859	George Cornewall Lewis	Liberal	George Cornewall Lewis	Liberal	Home Secretary
Wolverhampton	27 June 1859	Richard Bethell	Liberal	Richard Bethell	Liberal	Attorney General for England and Wales
Tiverton	27 June 1859	Henry John Temple	Liberal	Henry John Temple	Liberal	Prime Minister and First Lord of the Treasury
Reading	27 June 1859	Henry Singer Keating	Liberal	Henry Singer Keating	Liberal	Solicitor General for England and Wales
Oxford	27 June 1859	Edward Cardwell	Liberal	Edward Cardwell	Liberal	Chief Secretary for Ireland
Morpeth	27 June 1859	George Grey	Liberal	George Grey	Liberal	Chancellor of the Duchy of Lancaster
Lewes	27 June 1859	Henry Fitzroy	Liberal	Henry Fitzroy	Liberal	First Commissioner of Works
Devonport	27 June 1859	James Wilson	Liberal	James Wilson	Liberal	Vice-President of the Board of Trade and Paymaster General
Calne	27 June 1859	Robert Lowe	Liberal	Robert Lowe	Liberal	Vice-President of the Committee of the Council on Education
Ashton-under-Lyne	27 June 1859	Thomas Milner Gibson	Liberal	Thomas Milner Gibson	Liberal	President of the Poor Law Board
City of London	27 June 1859	Lord John Russell	Liberal	Lord John Russell	Liberal	Foreign Secretary

=== 17th Parliament (1857–1859) ===
By-election	Date	Former incumbent	Party	Winner	Party	Position
Stirlingshire	14 March 1859 (Note: Uncontested)	Peter Blackburn	Conservative	Peter Blackburn	Conservative	Junior Lord of the Treasury (Note: Seat vacated on appointment to the office noted.)
North Northumberland	10 March 1859	Algernon Percy	Conservative	Algernon Percy	Conservative	Vice-President of the Board of Trade and Paymaster General
West Sussex	9 March 1859	Charles Gordon-Lennox	Conservative	Charles Gordon-Lennox	Conservative	President of the Poor Law Board
North Wiltshire	8 March 1859	T. H. S. Sotheron-Estcourt	Conservative	T. H. S. Sotheron-Estcourt	Conservative	Home Secretary
Tewkesbury	8 March 1859	Frederick Lygon	Conservative	Frederick Lygon	Conservative	Civil Lord of the Admiralty
Boston	3 February 1859	William Henry Adams	Conservative	William Henry Adams	Conservative	Recorder of Derby
Hertfordshire	8 June 1858	Edward Bulwer-Lytton	Conservative	Edward Bulwer-Lytton	Conservative	Secretary of State for the Colonies
King's Lynn	5 June 1858	Lord Stanley	Conservative	Lord Stanley	Conservative	President of the Board of Control
City Durham	17 March 1858	John Mowbray	Conservative	John Mowbray	Conservative	Judge Advocate General
Tyrone	11 March 1858	Lord Claud Hamilton	Conservative	Lord Claud Hamilton	Conservative	Treasurer of the Household
North Northumberland	11 March 1858	Algernon Percy	Conservative	Algernon Percy	Conservative	Civil Lord of the Admiralty
County Dublin	11 March 1858	Thomas Edward Taylor	Conservative	Thomas Edward Taylor	Conservative	Junior Lord of the Treasury
South Shropshire	9 March 1858	Orlando Bridgeman	Conservative	Orlando Bridgeman	Conservative	Vice-Chamberlain of the Household
Enniskillen	9 March 1858	James Whiteside	Conservative	James Whiteside	Conservative	Attorney-General for Ireland
North Staffordshire	8 March 1858	Charles Adderley	Conservative	Charles Adderley	Conservative	Vice-President of the Committee of the Council on Education and President of the Board of Health
North Leicestershire	8 March 1858	Lord John Manners	Conservative	Lord John Manners	Conservative	First Commissioner of Works
Buckinghamshire	8 March 1858	Benjamin Disraeli	Conservative	Benjamin Disraeli	Conservative	Chancellor of the Exchequer
East Suffolk	6 March 1858	Fitzroy Kelly	Conservative	Fitzroy Kelly	Conservative	Attorney General for England and Wales
Oxfordshire	6 March 1858	J. W. Henley	Conservative	J. W. Henley	Conservative	President of the Board of Trade
Chichester	6 March 1858	Lord Henry Lennox	Conservative	Lord Henry Lennox	Conservative	Junior Lord of the Treasury
North Wiltshire	5 March 1858	T. H. S. Sotheron-Estcourt	Conservative	T. H. S. Sotheron-Estcourt	Conservative	President of the Poor Law Board
Belfast	5 March 1858	Hugh Cairns	Conservative	Hugh Cairns	Conservative	Solicitor General for England and Wales
King's Lynn	4 March 1858	Lord Stanley	Conservative	Lord Stanley	Conservative	Secretary of State for the Colonies
Huntingdon	4 March 1858	Jonathan Peel	Conservative	Jonathan Peel	Conservative	Secretary of State for War and Secretary at War
Cambridge University	4 March 1858	Spencer Horatio Walpole	Conservative	Spencer Horatio Walpole	Conservative	Home Secretary
Wenlock	3 March 1858	George Weld-Forester	Conservative	George Weld-Forester	Conservative	Comptroller of the Household
Droitwich	3 March 1858	Sir John Pakington	Conservative	Sir John Pakington	Conservative	First Lord of the Admiralty
Cockermouth	3 March 1858	Lord Naas	Conservative	Lord Naas	Conservative	Chief Secretary for Ireland
Bridgnorth	3 March 1858	Henry Whitmore	Conservative	Henry Whitmore	Conservative	Junior Lord of the Treasury
Kerry	9 June 1857	Henry Arthur Herbert	Whig	Henry Arthur Herbert	Whig	Chief Secretary for Ireland
Reading	2 June 1857	Henry Singer Keating	Whig	Henry Singer Keating	Whig	Solicitor General for England and Wales
Penryn and Falmouth	27 May 1857	Thomas Baring	Whig	Thomas Baring	Whig	Civil Lord of the Admiralty

=== 16th Parliament (1852–1857) ===
By-election	Date	Former incumbent	Party	Winner	Party	Position
County Limerick	17 February 1857 (Note: Uncontested)	William Monsell	Whig	William Monsell	Whig	President of the Board of Health (Note: Seat vacated on appointment to the office noted.)
Buteshire	12 February 1857	James Stuart-Wortley	Peelite	James Stuart-Wortley	Peelite	Solicitor General for England and Wales
Hertford	9 February 1857	William Cowper	Whig	William Cowper	Whig	Vice-President of the Committee of the Council on Education
Aylesbury	9 February 1857	Richard Bethell	Whig	Richard Bethell	Whig	Attorney General for England and Wales
Kerry	9 August 1856	Valentine Browne	Whig	Valentine Browne	Whig	Comptroller of the Household
Ennis	8 April 1856	John FitzGerald	Whig	John FitzGerald	Whig	Attorney-General for Ireland
Leeds	6 February 1856	Matthew Talbot Baines	Whig	Matthew Talbot Baines	Whig	Chancellor of the Duchy of Lancaster
Taunton	5 February 1856	Henry Labouchere	Whig	Henry Labouchere	Whig	Secretary of State for the Colonies
Kilmarnock Burghs	16 August 1855	Edward Pleydell-Bouverie	Whig	Edward Pleydell-Bouverie	Whig	President of the Poor Law Board
Kidderminster	14 August 1855	Robert Lowe	Whig	Robert Lowe	Whig	Vice-President of the Board of Trade and Paymaster General
Hertford	14 August 1855	William Cowper	Whig	William Cowper	Whig	President of the Board of Health
Marylebone	28 July 1855	Sir Benjamin Hall	Peelite	Sir Benjamin Hall	Peelite	First Commissioner of Works
Southwark	27 July 1855	Sir William Molesworth	Radical	Sir William Molesworth	Radical	Secretary of State for the Colonies
Kilmarnock Burghs	7 April 1855	Edward Pleydell-Bouverie	Whig	Edward Pleydell-Bouverie	Whig	Vice-President of the Board of Trade and Paymaster General
Lewes	5 April 1855	Henry Brand	Whig	Henry Brand	Whig	Junior Lord of the Treasury
Gloucester	31 March 1855	William Philip Price	Whig	William Philip Price	Whig	Seeks re-election after his firm was granted a contract to supply huts to the army in the Crimea
Tamworth	14 March 1855	Sir Robert Peel	Peelite	Sir Robert Peel	Peelite	Civil Lord of the Admiralty
Portsmouth	14 March 1855	Charles Monck	Whig	Charles Monck	Whig	Junior Lord of the Treasury
Forfarshire	10 March 1855	Adam Duncan	Whig	Adam Duncan	Whig	Junior Lord of the Treasury
Ennis	8 March 1855	John FitzGerald	Independent Irish	John FitzGerald	Whig	Solicitor-General for Ireland
Athlone	7 March 1855	William Keogh	Whig	William Keogh	Whig	Attorney-General for Ireland
Stroud	6 March 1855	Edward Horsman	Whig	Edward Horsman	Whig	Chief Secretary for Ireland
Radnor Boroughs	5 March 1855	George Cornewall Lewis	Whig	George Cornewall Lewis	Whig	Chancellor of the Exchequer
Northampton	5 March 1855	Robert Vernon Smith	Whig	Robert Vernon Smith	Whig	President of the Board of Control
Halifax	3 March 1855	Sir Charles Wood	Whig	Sir Charles Wood	Whig	First Lord of the Admiralty
City of London	3 March 1855	Lord John Russell	Whig	Lord John Russell	Whig	Secretary of State for the Colonies
South Wiltshire	15 February 1855	Sidney Herbert	Peelite	Sidney Herbert	Peelite	Secretary of State for the Colonies
Tiverton	12 February 1855	Henry John Temple	Whig	Henry John Temple	Whig	Prime Minister and First Lord of the Treasury
Sunderland	2 January 1855	William Digby Seymour	Whig	Henry Fenwick	Whig	Recorder of Newcastle
Marylebone	16 August 1854	Sir Benjamin Hall	Whig	Sir Benjamin Hall	Whig	President of the Board of Health
Morpeth	17 June 1854	Sir George Grey	Whig	Sir George Grey	Whig	Secretary of State for the Colonies
City of London	14 June 1854	Lord John Russell	Whig	Lord John Russell	Whig	Lord President of the Council
Southampton	12 April 1854	Alexander Cockburn	Whig	Alexander Cockburn	Whig	Recorder of Bristol
Louth	27 February 1854	Chichester Fortescue	Whig	Chichester Fortescue	Whig	Junior Lord of the Treasury
Athlone	23 April 1853	William Keogh	Independent Irish	William Keogh	Whig	Solicitor-General for Ireland
Forfarshire	25 February 1853	Lauderdale Maule	Whig	Lauderdale Maule	Whig	Surveyor-General of the Ordnance
Oxford University	20 January 1853	William Ewart Gladstone	Peelite	William Ewart Gladstone	Peelite	Chancellor of the Exchequer
Carlow Borough	20 January 1853	John Sadleir	Independent Irish	John Alexander	Conservative	Junior Lord of the Treasury
County Limerick	12 January 1853	William Monsell	Whig	William Monsell	Whig	Clerk of the Ordnance
Dumfriesshire	12 January 1853	Archibald Douglas	Peelite	Archibald Douglas	Peelite	Comptroller of the Household
South Wiltshire	11 January 1853	Sidney Herbert	Peelite	Sidney Herbert	Peelite	Secretary at War
Haddingtonshire	11 January 1853	Francis Charteris	Peelite	Francis Charteris	Peelite	Junior Lord of the Treasury
County Cavan	10 January 1853	Sir John Young	Peelite	Sir John Young	Peelite	Chief Secretary for Ireland
Southampton	7 January 1853	Sir Alexander Cockburn	Whig	Sir Alexander Cockburn	Whig	Attorney General for England and Wales
Aylesbury	6 January 1853	Richard Bethell	Whig	Richard Bethell	Whig	Solicitor General for England and Wales
Lichfield	5 January 1853	Lord Alfred Paget	Whig	Lord Alfred Paget	Whig	Chief Equerry and Clerk Marshal
Halifax	5 January 1853	Charles Wood	Whig	Charles Wood	Whig	President of the Board of Control
Wolverhampton	4 January 1853	Charles Pelham Villiers	Whig	Charles Pelham Villiers	Whig	Judge Advocate General
Marlborough	4 January 1853	Lord Ernest Bruce	Peelite	Lord Ernest Bruce	Peelite	Vice-Chamberlain of the Household
Leith Burghs	4 January 1853	James Moncreiff	Whig	James Moncreiff	Whig	Lord Advocate
Gloucester	4 January 1853	Maurice Berkeley	Whig	Maurice Berkeley	Whig	Second Sea Lord
Brighton	4 January 1853	Lord Alfred Hervey	Peelite	Lord Alfred Hervey	Peelite	Junior Lord of the Treasury
Tiverton	3 January 1853	Henry John Temple	Whig	Henry John Temple	Whig	Home Secretary
Carlisle	3 January 1853	Matthew Talbot Baines	Whig	Matthew Talbot Baines	Whig	President of the Poor Law Board
City of London	3 January 1853	Lord John Russell	Whig	Lord John Russell	Whig	Foreign Secretary
Scarborough	1 January 1853	George Phipps	Whig	George Phipps	Whig	Treasurer of the Household
Nottingham	1 January 1853	Edward Strutt	Whig	Edward Strutt	Whig	Chancellor of the Duchy of Lancaster
Hertford	1 January 1853	William Cowper	Whig	William Cowper	Whig	Civil Lord of the Admiralty
Carlisle	1 January 1853	Sir James Graham	Peelite	Sir James Graham	Peelite	First Lord of the Admiralty
Southwark	1 January 1853	Sir William Molesworth	Radical	Sir William Molesworth	Radical	First Commissioner of Works

=== 15th Parliament (1847–1852) ===
By-election	Date	Former incumbent	Party	Winner	Party	Position
Dungannon	24 March 1852 (Note: Uncontested)	William Knox	Conservative	William Knox	Conservative	Parliamentary Groom in Waiting (Note: Seat vacated on appointment to the office noted.)
South Shropshire	23 March 1852	Orlando Bridgeman	Conservative	Orlando Bridgeman	Conservative	Vice-Chamberlain of the Household
East Retford	19 March 1852	George Monckton-Arundell	Conservative	George Monckton-Arundell	Conservative	Lord-in-waiting
County Londonderry	13 March 1852	Thomas Bateson	Conservative	Thomas Bateson	Conservative	Junior Lord of the Treasury
North Lincolnshire	13 March 1852	Robert Christopher	Conservative	Robert Christopher	Conservative	Resignation pending appointment as Chancellor of the Duchy of Lancaster
Kildare	13 March 1852 (Note: Naas sought re-election at Coleraine.)	Richard Bourke	Conservative	William H. F. Cogan	Whig	Chief Secretary for Ireland
Tyrone	12 March 1852	Lord Claud Hamilton	Conservative	Lord Claud Hamilton	Conservative	Treasurer of the Household
South Lincolnshire	12 March 1852	Sir John Trollope	Conservative	Sir John Trollope	Conservative	President of the Poor Law Board
Buckinghamshire	12 March 1852	Benjamin Disraeli	Conservative	Benjamin Disraeli	Conservative	Chancellor of the Exchequer
Oxfordshire	10 March 1852	J. W. Henley	Conservative	J. W. Henley	Conservative	President of the Board of Trade
East Riding of Yorkshire	9 March 1852	Arthur Duncombe	Conservative	Arthur Duncombe	Conservative	Fourth Naval Lord
North Essex	9 March 1852	William Beresford	Conservative	William Beresford	Conservative	Secretary at War
Enniskillen	9 March 1852	James Whiteside	Conservative	James Whiteside	Conservative	Solicitor-General for Ireland
Dublin University	9 March 1852	Joseph Napier	Conservative	Joseph Napier	Conservative	Attorney-General for Ireland
Dorset	9 March 1852	George Bankes	Conservative	George Bankes	Conservative	Judge Advocate General
Portarlington	8 March 1852	Francis Plunkett Dunne	Conservative	Francis Plunkett Dunne	Conservative	Clerk of the Ordnance
Stamford	6 March 1852	John Charles Herries	Conservative	John Charles Herries	Conservative	President of the Board of Control
Midhurst	5 March 1852	Spencer Horatio Walpole	Conservative	Spencer Horatio Walpole	Conservative	Home Secretary
Buckingham	5 March 1852	Marquess of Chandos	Conservative	Marquess of Chandos	Conservative	Junior Lord of the Treasury
Abingdon	5 March 1852	Sir Frederic Thesiger	Conservative	Sir Frederic Thesiger	Conservative	Attorney General for England and Wales
Droitwich	4 March 1852	Sir John Pakington	Conservative	Sir John Pakington	Conservative	Secretary of State for War and the Colonies
Colchester	4 March 1852	Lord John Manners	Conservative	Lord John Manners	Conservative	First Commissioner of Works
Chichester	4 March 1852	Lord Henry Lennox	Conservative	Lord Henry Lennox	Conservative	Junior Lord of the Treasury
Wenlock	3 March 1852	George Weld-Forester	Conservative	George Weld-Forester	Conservative	Comptroller of the Household
Northampton	11 February 1852	Robert Vernon Smith	Whig	Robert Vernon Smith	Whig	Secretary at War
Perth	9 February 1852	Fox Maule	Whig	Fox Maule	Whig	President of the Board of Control
Scarborough	19 July 1851	George Phipps	Whig	George Frederick Young	Conservative	Comptroller of the Household
Oxford	3 April 1851	William Wood	Whig	William Wood	Whig	Solicitor General for England and Wales
Southampton	2 April 1851	Alexander Cockburn	Whig	Alexander Cockburn	Whig	Attorney General for England and Wales
Devonport	2 April 1851	John Romilly	Whig	John Romilly	Whig	Master of the Rolls
Windsor	10 February 1851	John Hatchell	Whig	John Hatchell	Whig	Attorney-General for Ireland
Southampton	17 July 1850	Alexander Cockburn	Whig	Alexander Cockburn	Whig	Solicitor General for England and Wales
Devonport	17 July 1850	Sir John Romilly	Whig	Sir John Romilly	Whig	Attorney General for England and Wales
Totnes	30 March 1850	Lord Seymour	Whig	Lord Seymour	Whig	First Commissioner of Woods and Forests
Sutherland	5 June 1849	Sir David Dundas	Whig	Sir David Dundas	Whig	Judge Advocate General
Kingston upon Hull	7 February 1849	Matthew Talbot Baines	Whig	Matthew Talbot Baines	Whig	President of the Poor Law Board
Portsmouth	6 February 1849	Francis Baring	Whig	Francis Baring	Whig	First Lord of the Admiralty
Devonport	3 April 1848	John Romilly	Whig	John Romilly	Whig	Solicitor General for England and Wales
Wells	27 December 1847	William Hayter	Whig	William Hayter	Whig	Judge Advocate General
Calne	27 December 1847	Henry Petty-Fitzmaurice	Whig	Henry Petty-Fitzmaurice	Whig	Junior Lord of the Treasury
Newcastle-under-Lyme	15 December 1847	Samuel Christy	Conservative	Samuel Christy	Conservative	Seeks re-election due to his firm holding a government contract
Edinburgh	15 December 1847	Charles Cowan	Whig	Charles Cowan	Whig	Disqualification (held government contract)
Liskeard	14 December 1847	Charles Buller	Whig	Charles Buller	Whig	President of the Poor Law Board

=== 14th Parliament (1841–1847) ===
By-election	Date	Former incumbent	Party	Winner	Party	Position
Derby	4 September 1846	Edward Strutt	Whig	Edward Strutt	Whig	Resignation pending appointment as President of the Railway Commission
St. Albans	11 August 1846	William Hare	Whig	Benjamin Bond Cabbell	Conservative	Lord-in-waiting (Note: Seat vacated on appointment to the office noted.)
Chester	8 August 1846 (Note: Uncontested)	Lord Robert Grosvenor	Whig	Lord Robert Grosvenor	Whig	Treasurer of the Household
Sutherland	28 July 1846	David Dundas	Whig	David Dundas	Whig	Solicitor General for England and Wales
Roscommon	21 July 1846	Denis O'Conor	Repeal	Denis O'Conor	Whig	Junior Lord of the Treasury
West Riding of Yorkshire	18 July 1846	George Howard	Whig	George Howard	Whig	First Commissioner of Woods and Forests
South Staffordshire	17 July 1846	George Anson	Whig	George Anson	Whig	Clerk of the Ordnance
Kirkcudbrightshire	17 July 1846	Thomas Maitland	Whig	Thomas Maitland	Whig	Solicitor General for Scotland
Liskeard	15 July 1846	Charles Buller	Whig	Charles Buller	Whig	Judge Advocate General
Lichfield	15 July 1846	Lord Alfred Paget	Whig	Lord Alfred Paget	Whig	Chief Equerry and Clerk Marshal
Edinburgh	15 July 1846	Thomas Babington Macaulay	Whig	Thomas Babington Macaulay	Whig	Paymaster General
Richmond	13 July 1846	Henry Rich	Whig	Henry Rich	Whig	Junior Lord of the Treasury
Manchester	13 July 1846	Thomas Milner Gibson	Whig	Thomas Milner Gibson	Whig	Vice-President of the Board of Trade
Greenwich	13 July 1846	James Whitley Deans Dundas	Whig	James Whitley Deans Dundas	Whig	Second Naval Lord
Edinburgh	13 July 1846	William Gibson-Craig	Whig	William Gibson-Craig	Whig	Junior Lord of the Treasury
Tower Hamlets	11 July 1846	Charles Richard Fox	Whig	Charles Richard Fox	Whig	Surveyor-General of the Ordnance
Plymouth	11 July 1846	Hugh Fortescue	Whig	Hugh Fortescue	Whig	Junior Lord of the Treasury
Perth	11 July 1846	Fox Maule	Whig	Fox Maule	Whig	Secretary at War
Hertford	11 July 1846	William Cowper	Whig	William Cowper	Whig	Civil Lord of the Admiralty
Gloucester	11 July 1846	Maurice Berkeley	Whig	Maurice Berkeley	Whig	Third Naval Lord
Evesham	11 July 1846	Marcus Sandys	Whig	Marcus Sandys	Whig	Comptroller of the Household
Chester	11 July 1846	John Jervis	Whig	John Jervis	Whig	Solicitor General for England and Wales
Tiverton	10 July 1846	Henry John Temple	Whig	Henry John Temple	Whig	Foreign Secretary
Taunton	10 July 1846	Henry Labouchere	Whig	Henry Labouchere	Whig	Resignation pending appointment as Chief Secretary for Ireland
Dungarvan	10 July 1846	Richard Lalor Sheil	Whig	Richard Lalor Sheil	Whig	Master of the Mint
Devonport	10 July 1846	Sir George Grey	Whig	Sir George Grey	Whig	Home Secretary
Leith Burghs	9 July 1846	Andrew Rutherfurd	Whig	Andrew Rutherfurd	Whig	Lord Advocate
Halifax	9 July 1846	Charles Wood	Whig	Charles Wood	Whig	Chancellor of the Exchequer
Worcester	8 July 1846	Thomas Wilde	Whig	Denis Le Marchant	Whig	Attorney General for England and Wales
Nottingham	8 July 1846	John Hobhouse	Whig	John Hobhouse	Whig	President of the Board of Control
City of London	8 July 1846	Lord John Russell	Whig	Lord John Russell	Whig	Prime Minister and First Lord of the Treasury
Windsor	14 March 1846	Ralph Neville	Conservative	Ralph Neville	Conservative	Junior Lord of the Treasury
Stafford	13 March 1846	Swynfen Carnegie	Conservative	Swynfen Carnegie	Conservative	Junior Lord of the Treasury
South Nottinghamshire	27 February 1846	Henry Pelham-Clinton	Conservative	Thomas Thoroton-Hildyard	Conservative	Chief Secretary for Ireland
Westminster	19 February 1846	Henry John Rous	Conservative	De Lacy Evans	Whig	Fourth Naval Lord
Buteshire	7 February 1846	James Stuart-Wortley	Conservative	James Stuart-Wortley	Conservative	Judge Advocate General
Newark	29 January 1846 (Note: Gladstone did not stand for re-election as he had lost the support of his borough's patron. Gladstone did not stand again until the 1847 general election where he was successful at regaining a seat.)	William Ewart Gladstone	Conservative	John Stuart	Conservative	Secretary of State for War and the Colonies
Cirencester	14 August 1845	William Cripps	Conservative	William Cripps	Conservative	Junior Lord of the Treasury
Warwick	13 August 1845	Charles Eurwicke Douglas	Conservative	Charles Eurwicke Douglas	Conservative	Commissioner of Greenwich Hospital
Chichester	12 August 1845	Lord Arthur Lennox	Conservative	Lord Arthur Lennox	Conservative	Clerk of the Ordnance
Cambridge	16 July 1845	Fitzroy Kelly	Conservative	Fitzroy Kelly	Conservative	Solicitor General for England and Wales
Abingdon	9 July 1845	Frederic Thesiger	Conservative	Frederic Thesiger	Conservative	Attorney General for England and Wales
Denbighshire	7 May 1845	Sir Watkin Williams-Wynn	Conservative	Sir Watkin Williams-Wynn	Conservative	Steward of Bromfield and Yale
Peeblesshire	5 May 1845	William Forbes Mackenzie	Conservative	William Forbes Mackenzie	Conservative	Junior Lord of the Treasury
Thetford	24 February 1845	Bingham Baring	Conservative	Bingham Baring	Conservative	Paymaster General
Lewes	17 February 1845	Henry Fitzroy	Conservative	Henry Fitzroy	Conservative	Civil Lord of the Admiralty
South Wiltshire	15 February 1845	Sidney Herbert	Conservative	Sidney Herbert	Conservative	Secretary at War
Stamford	10 February 1845	Sir George Clerk	Conservative	Sir George Clerk	Conservative	Vice-President of the Board of Trade and Master of the Mint
Buckingham	10 February 1845	Thomas Fremantle	Conservative	Thomas Fremantle	Conservative	Chief Secretary for Ireland
Chichester	27 May 1844	Lord Arthur Lennox	Conservative	Lord Arthur Lennox	Conservative	Junior Lord of the Treasury
Buckingham	25 May 1844	Sir Thomas Fremantle	Conservative	Sir Thomas Fremantle	Conservative	Secretary at War
Woodstock	22 April 1844	Frederic Thesiger (Note: Thesiger sought re-election at Abingdon.)	Conservative	John Spencer-Churchill	Conservative	Solicitor General for England and Wales
Exeter	20 April 1844	William Webb Follett	Conservative	William Webb Follett	Conservative	Attorney General for England and Wales
Bandon	14 February 1842	Joseph Devonsher Jackson (Note: Jackson sought re-election at Dublin University.)	Conservative	Francis Bernard	Conservative	Solicitor-General for Ireland
Linlithgowshire	20 October 1841	Charles Hope	Conservative	Charles Hope	Conservative	Commissioner of Greenwich Hospital
East Retford	2 October 1841	Arthur Duncombe	Conservative	Arthur Duncombe	Conservative	Groom in Waiting in Ordinary
County Cavan	30 September 1841	John Young	Conservative	John Young	Conservative	Junior Lord of the Treasury
County Sligo	28 September 1841	Alexander Perceval	Conservative	John Ffolliott	Conservative	Junior Lord of the Treasury (Note: MP appointed Serjeant-At-Arms of the House of Lords before writ moved.)
Portarlington	27 September 1841	George Dawson-Damer	Conservative	George Dawson-Damer	Conservative	Comptroller of the Household
Monmouthshire	24 September 1841	Lord Granville Somerset	Conservative	Lord Granville Somerset	Conservative	Chancellor of the Duchy of Lancaster
Tyrone	23 September 1841	Henry Lowry-Corry	Conservative	Henry Lowry-Corry	Conservative	Civil Lord of the Admiralty
Buteshire	23 September 1841	William Rae	Conservative	William Rae	Conservative	Lord Advocate
East Cornwall	22 September 1841	Lord Eliot	Conservative	Lord Eliot	Conservative	Chief Secretary for Ireland
Selkirkshire	21 September 1841	Alexander Pringle	Conservative	Alexander Pringle	Conservative	Junior Lord of the Treasury
North Lancashire	21 September 1841	Lord Stanley	Conservative	Lord Stanley	Conservative	Secretary of State for War and the Colonies
Aberdeenshire	21 September 1841	William Gordon	Conservative	William Gordon	Conservative	Fourth Naval Lord
South Nottinghamshire	20 September 1841	Henry Pelham-Clinton	Conservative	Henry Pelham-Clinton	Conservative	First Commissioner of Woods and Forests
Lisburn	20 September 1841	Henry Meynell	Conservative	Henry Meynell	Conservative	Parliamentary Groom in Waiting
East Kent	20 September 1841	Sir Edward Knatchbull	Conservative	Sir Edward Knatchbull	Conservative	Paymaster General
Cardiff Boroughs	17 September 1841	John Iltyd Nicholl	Conservative	John Iltyd Nicholl	Conservative	Judge Advocate General
Launceston	15 September 1841	Henry Hardinge	Conservative	Henry Hardinge	Conservative	Secretary at War
Cambridge University	15 September 1841	Henry Goulburn	Conservative	Henry Goulburn	Conservative	Chancellor of the Exchequer
Wenlock	14 September 1841	James Milnes Gaskell	Conservative	James Milnes Gaskell	Conservative	Junior Lord of the Treasury
Newark	14 September 1841	William Ewart Gladstone	Conservative	William Ewart Gladstone	Conservative	Vice-President of the Board of Trade and Master of the Mint
Marlborough	14 September 1841	Henry Bingham Baring	Conservative	Henry Bingham Baring	Conservative	Junior Lord of the Treasury
Marlborough	14 September 1841	Lord Ernest Bruce	Conservative	Lord Ernest Bruce	Conservative	Vice-Chamberlain of the Household
Huntingdon	14 September 1841	Jonathan Peel	Conservative	Jonathan Peel	Conservative	Surveyor-General of the Ordnance
Huntingdon	14 September 1841	Frederick Pollock	Conservative	Frederick Pollock	Conservative	Attorney General for England and Wales
Chippenham	14 September 1841	Henry George Boldero	Conservative	Henry George Boldero	Conservative	Clerk of the Ordnance
Bury St. Edmunds	14 September 1841	Earl of Jermyn	Conservative	Earl of Jermyn	Conservative	Treasurer of the Household
Tamworth	13 September 1841	Robert Peel	Conservative	Robert Peel	Conservative	Prime Minister and First Lord of the Treasury
Exeter	13 September 1841	William Webb Follett	Conservative	William Webb Follett	Conservative	Solicitor General for England and Wales
Dorchester	13 September 1841	Sir James Graham	Conservative	Sir James Graham	Conservative	Home Secretary

=== 13th Parliament (1837–1841) ===
By-election	Date	Former incumbent	Party	Winner	Party	Position
Clonmel	21 August 1840 (Note: Uncontested)	David Richard Pigot	Whig	David Richard Pigot	Whig	Attorney-General for Ireland (Note: Seat vacated on appointment to the office noted.)
Cockermouth	1 June 1840	Edward Horsman	Whig	Edward Horsman	Whig	Junior Lord of the Treasury
Newark-on-Trent	25 January 1840	Thomas Wilde	Whig	Thomas Wilde	Whig	Solicitor General for England and Wales
Edinburgh	23 January 1840	Thomas Babington Macaulay	Whig	Thomas Babington Macaulay	Whig	Secretary at War
Tipperary	16 September 1839	Richard Lalor Sheil	Whig	Richard Lalor Sheil	Whig	Vice-President of the Board of Trade
Waterford City	6 September 1839	Thomas Wyse	Whig	Thomas Wyse	Whig	Junior Lord of the Treasury
Portsmouth	30 August 1839	Francis Baring	Whig	Francis Baring	Whig	Chancellor of the Exchequer
Hertford	20 May 1839	William Cowper	Whig	William Cowper	Whig	Commissioner of Greenwich Hospital
Southwark	27 February 1839	Daniel Whittle Harvey	Whig	Daniel Whittle Harvey	Whig	Registrar of the Metropolitan Public Carriages
Devonport	20 February 1839	Sir George Grey	Whig	Sir George Grey	Whig	Judge Advocate General
Tower Hamlets	11 February 1839	Stephen Lushington	Whig	Stephen Lushington	Whig	Judge of the High Court of Admiralty
Clonmel	16 July 1838	Nicholas Ball	Whig	Nicholas Ball	Whig	Attorney-General for Ireland
Devizes	26 March 1838	James Whitley Deans Dundas	Whig	James Whitley Deans Dundas	Whig	Clerk of the Ordnance
Devizes	26 March 1838	James Whitley Deans Dundas	Whig	George Heneage Walker Heneage	Conservative	By-election result reversed on petition
Tipperary	27 February 1838	Richard Lalor Sheil	Whig	Richard Lalor Sheil	Whig	Commissioner of Greenwich Hospital
Galway Borough	12 February 1838	Andrew Henry Lynch	Whig	Andrew Henry Lynch	Whig	Master in Chancery

=== 12th Parliament (1835–1837) ===
By-election	Date	Former incumbent	Party	Winner	Party	Position
Cashel	10 February 1837 (Note: Uncontested)	Stephen Woulfe	Whig	Stephen Woulfe	Whig	Solicitor-General for Ireland (Note: Seat vacated on appointment to the office noted.)
Sheffield	22 August 1836	John Parker	Whig	John Parker	Whig	Junior Lord of the Treasury
Dungarvan	21 September 1835	Michael O'Loghlen	Whig	Michael O'Loghlen	Whig	Attorney-General for Ireland
Bury St Edmunds	26 June 1835	Lord Charles FitzRoy	Whig	Lord Charles FitzRoy	Whig	Vice-Chamberlain of the Household
Kildare	26 May 1835	Richard More O'Ferrall	Whig	Richard More O'Ferrall	Whig	Junior Lord of the Treasury
Malton	19 May 1835	Charles Pepys	Whig	Charles Pepys	Whig	First Commissioner of the Great Seal
Leith Burghs	8 May 1835	John Murray	Whig	John Murray	Whig	Lord Advocate
South Devon	7 May 1835	Lord John Russell	Whig	Montague Parker	Conservative	Home Secretary
West Riding of Yorkshire	6 May 1835	George Howard	Whig	George Howard	Whig	Resignation pending appointment as Chief Secretary for Ireland
Dundee	6 May 1835	Sir Henry Parnell	Whig	Sir Henry Parnell	Whig	Treasurer of the Navy, Treasurer of the Ordnance and Paymaster of the Forces
Stirling Burghs	5 May 1835	Archibald Primrose	Whig	Archibald Primrose	Whig	Civil Lord of the Admiralty
Dungarvan	4 May 1835	Michael O'Loghlen	Whig	Michael O'Loghlen	Whig	Solicitor-General for Ireland
Clackmannanshire and Kinross-shire	4 May 1835	Charles Adam	Whig	Charles Adam	Whig	First Naval Lord
Kirkcudbrightshire	2 May 1835	Robert Cutlar Fergusson	Whig	Robert Cutlar Fergusson	Whig	Judge Advocate General
Haddington Burghs	2 May 1835	Robert Steuart	Whig	Robert Steuart	Whig	Junior Lord of the Treasury
Elgin Burghs	2 May 1835	Andrew Leith Hay	Whig	Andrew Leith Hay	Whig	Clerk of the Ordnance
North Northumberland	1 May 1835	Henry Grey	Whig	Henry Grey	Whig	Secretary at War
Manchester	30 April 1835	Charles Poulett Thomson	Whig	Charles Poulett Thomson	Whig	President of the Board of Trade
Edinburgh	30 April 1835	John Campbell	Whig	John Campbell	Whig	Attorney General for England and Wales
Taunton	29 April 1835	Henry Labouchere	Whig	Henry Labouchere	Whig	Vice-President of the Board of Trade and Master of the Mint
Penryn and Falmouth	28 April 1835	Robert Rolfe	Whig	Robert Rolfe	Whig	Solicitor General for England and Wales
Cashel	28 April 1835	Louis Perrin	Whig	Louis Perrin	Whig	Attorney-General for Ireland
Sandwich	27 April 1835	Sir Edward Troubridge	Whig	Sir Edward Troubridge	Whig	Fourth Naval Lord
Newport (I.O.W.)	27 April 1835	William Ord	Whig	William Ord	Whig	Junior Lord of the Treasury
Cambridge	27 April 1835	Thomas Spring Rice	Whig	Thomas Spring Rice	Whig	Chancellor of the Exchequer
Berwick-upon-Tweed	27 April 1835	Rufane Shaw Donkin	Whig	Rufane Shaw Donkin	Whig	Surveyor-General of the Ordnance
Totnes	24 April 1835	Lord Seymour	Whig	Lord Seymour	Whig	Junior Lord of the Treasury
Nottingham	24 April 1835	Sir John Hobhouse	Whig	Sir John Hobhouse	Whig	President of the Board of Control
Cardiff Boroughs	20 March 1835	John Iltyd Nicholl	Conservative	John Iltyd Nicholl	Conservative	Junior Lord of the Treasury

=== 11th Parliament (1832–1834) ===
By-election	Date	Former incumbent	Party	Winner	Party	Position
Kirkcudbrightshire	3 July 1834 (Note: Uncontested)	Robert Cutlar Fergusson	Whig	Robert Cutlar Fergusson	Whig	Judge Advocate General (Note: Seat vacated on appointment to the office noted.)
Elgin Burghs	30 June 1834	Andrew Leith Hay	Whig	Andrew Leith Hay	Whig	Clerk of the Ordnance
Edinburgh	23 June 1834	James Abercromby	Whig	James Abercromby	Whig	Master of the Mint
Cambridge	13 June 1834	Thomas Spring Rice	Whig	Thomas Spring Rice	Whig	Secretary of State for War and the Colonies
Leith Burghs	2 June 1834	John Murray	Whig	John Murray	Whig	Lord Advocate
Malton	4 March 1834	Charles Pepys	Whig	Charles Pepys	Whig	Solicitor General for England and Wales
Dudley	28 February 1834	John Campbell	Whig	Thomas Hawkes	Tory	Attorney General for England and Wales
South Staffordshire	7 June 1833	Edward Littleton	Whig	Edward Littleton	Whig	Chief Secretary for Ireland
North Lancashire	12 April 1833	Edward Stanley	Whig	Edward Stanley	Whig	Secretary of State for War and the Colonies
Coventry	12 April 1833	Edward Ellice	Whig	Edward Ellice	Whig	Secretary at War
Gloucester	9 April 1833	Maurice Berkeley	Whig	Henry Thomas Hope	Tory	Fourth Naval Lord
Westminster	4 April 1833	Sir John Hobhouse	Whig	Sir John Hobhouse	Whig	Chief Secretary for Ireland

=== 10th Parliament (1831–1832) ===
Date	Constituency	c/u	Former incumbent	Winner	Position
31 July 1832	Winchelsea	u	James Brougham	James Brougham	Clerk of Patents and Registrar of Affidavits at the Court of Chancery
16 June 1832	Cricklade	u	Robert Gordon	Robert Gordon	Commissioner of the Board of Control
13 June 1832	Calne	u	Thomas Babington Macaulay	Thomas Babington Macaulay	Commissioner of the Board of Control
12 June 1832	Taunton	u	Henry Labouchere	Henry Labouchere	Civil Lord of the Admiralty
5 March 1832	Ayr Burghs	u	Thomas Francis Kennedy	Thomas Francis Kennedy	Clerk of the Ordnance
8 February 1832	Westminster	u	Sir John Hobhouse	Sir John Hobhouse	Secretary at War

=== 9th Parliament (1830–1831) ===
Date	Constituency	c/u	Former incumbent	Winner	Position
16 April 1831	Queen's County	u	Sir Henry Parnell	Sir Henry Parnell	Secretary at War
21 March 1831	Nairnshire	u	George Campbell	George Campbell	Groom of the Bedchamber
28 February 1831	County Kilkenny	c	John Ponsonby	John Ponsonby	First Commissioner of Woods and Forests
10 January 1831	Bletchingley	u	Charles Tennyson	Charles Tennyson	Clerk of the Ordnance
30 December 1830	Inverness-shire	u	Charles Grant	Charles Grant	President of the Board of Control
17 December 1830	Preston	c	Edward Stanley	Henry Hunt	Chief Secretary for Ireland
15 December 1830	Montgomeryshire	u	Charles Williams-Wynn	Charles Williams-Wynn	Secretary at War
11 December 1830	Chester	c	Robert Grosvenor	Robert Grosvenor	Comptroller of the Household
10 December 1830	Calne	u	Sir James Macdonald	Sir James Macdonald	Commissioner of the Board of Control
8 December 1830	Cumberland	u	Sir James Graham	Sir James Graham	First Lord of the Admiralty
6 December 1830	Northamptonshire	u	John Spencer	John Spencer	Chancellor of the Exchequer
4 December 1830	Tralee	u	Robert Vernon	Robert Vernon	Junior Lord of the Treasury
4 December 1830	Youghal	u	George Ponsonby	George Ponsonby	Junior Lord of the Treasury
3 December 1830	Aylesbury	u	George Nugent-Grenville	George Nugent-Grenville	Junior Lord of the Treasury
2 December 1830	Knaresborough	u	Sir James Mackintosh	Sir James Mackintosh	Commissioner of the Board of Control
1 December 1830	Helston	u	Sir Samuel Pechell	Sir Samuel Pechell	Third Naval Lord
30 November 1830	Norwich	u	Robert Grant	Robert Grant	Judge Advocate General
30 November 1830	Cambridge University	u	Henry Temple	Henry Temple	Foreign Secretary
29 November 1830	Portsmouth	u	Francis Baring	Francis Baring	Junior Lord of the Treasury
29 November 1830	Okehampton	u	George Agar Ellis	George Agar Ellis	First Commissioner of Woods and Forests
29 November 1830	Nottingham	u	Thomas Denman	Thomas Denman	Attorney General for England and Wales
29 November 1830	Dover	u	Charles Poulett Thomson	Charles Poulett Thomson	Vice-President of the Board of Trade and Treasurer of the Navy

=== 8th Parliament (1826–1830) ===
Date	Constituency	c/u	Former incumbent	Winner	Position
20 April 1830	County Kerry	u	Maurice FitzGerald	Maurice FitzGerald	Vice Treasurer of Ireland
14 April 1830	Corfe Castle	u	George Bankes	George Bankes	Junior Lord of the Treasury
13 April 1830	East Looe	u	Henry Thomas Hope	Henry Thomas Hope	Groom of the Bedchamber
1 March 1830	Radnorshire	u	Thomas Frankland Lewis	Thomas Frankland Lewis	Treasurer of the Navy
20 February 1830	Wenlock	u	George Weld-Forester	George Weld-Forester	Groom of the Bedchamber
10 February 1830	Harwich	u	J. C. Herries	J. C. Herries	President of the Board of Trade
15 July 1829	County Down	u	Frederick Stewart	Frederick Stewart	Lord of the Admiralty
22 June 1829	Peterborough	u	James Scarlett	James Scarlett	Attorney General for England and Wales
15 June 1829	Weymouth and Melcombe Regis	c	Edward Sugden	Edward Sugden	Solicitor General for England and Wales
9 June 1829	Cambridge	u	Frederick Trench	Frederick Trench	Storekeeper of the Ordnance
11 March 1829	Bath	c	George Pratt	George Pratt	Election voided due to double return
11 March 1829	Bath	c	Charles Palmer	George Pratt	Election voided due to double return
23 February 1829	Edinburghshire	u	Sir George Clerk	Sir George Clerk	Lord of the Admiralty
13 February 1829	Bath	c	George Pratt	George Pratt	Lord of the Admiralty (Two MPs elected due to double return)
13 February 1829	Bath	c	George Pratt	Charles Palmer	Lord of the Admiralty (Two MPs elected due to double return)
12 February 1829	Whitchurch	u	John Townshend	John Townshend	Groom of the Bedchamber
12 February 1829	Plymouth	u	Sir George Cockburn	Sir George Cockburn	First Naval Lord
7 August 1828	Newport	u	Spencer Perceval	Spencer Perceval	Clerk of the Ordnance
7 July 1828	Sutherland	u	Lord Francis Leveson-Gower	Lord Francis Leveson-Gower	Chief Secretary for Ireland
5 July 1828	County Clare	c	William Vesey-FitzGerald	Daniel O'Connell	President of the Board of Trade
23 June 1828	Wareham	u	John Calcraft	John Calcraft	Paymaster of the Forces
17 June 1828	Perthshire	u	Sir George Murray	Sir George Murray	Secretary of State for War and the Colonies
16 June 1828	Westmorland	u	William Lowther	William Lowther	First Commissioner of Woods and Forests
10 June 1828	St Ives	u	Charles Arbuthnot	Charles Arbuthnot	Chancellor of the Duchy of Lancaster
9 June 1828	Totnes	u	Thomas Courtenay	Thomas Courtenay	Vice-President of the Board of Trade
9 June 1828	Durham City	u	Sir Henry Hardinge	Sir Henry Hardinge	Secretary at War
7 April 1828	Dumfriesshire	u	Sir William Johnstone Hope	Sir William Johnstone Hope	Treasurer of Greenwich Hospital
3 April 1828	Anglesey	u	Henry Paget	Henry Paget	State Steward to the Lord Lieutenant of Ireland
20 March 1828	County Longford	u	George Forbes	George Forbes	Comptroller of the Household to the Lord Lieutenant of Ireland
14 March 1828	Sandwich	u	Sir Edward Owen	Sir Edward Owen	Council of the Lord High Admiral
28 February 1828	Inverness-shire	u	Charles Grant	Charles Grant	President of the Board of Trade and Treasurer of the Navy
18 February 1828	Kilkenny City	c	John Doherty	John Doherty	Solicitor-General for Ireland
18 February 1828	Edinburghshire	u	Sir George Clerk	Sir George Clerk	Council of the Lord High Admiral
12 February 1828	Monmouthshire	u	Lord Granville Somerset	Lord Granville Somerset	Junior Lord of the Treasury
11 February 1828	Ennis	u	Thomas Frankland Lewis	Thomas Frankland Lewis	Vice President of the Board of Trade
11 February 1828	Bath	u	George Pratt	George Pratt	Council of the Lord High Admiral
9 February 1828	Plympton Erle	u	Charles Wetherell	Charles Wetherell	Attorney General for England and Wales
8 February 1828	New Woodstock	u	Anthony Ashley-Cooper	Anthony Ashley-Cooper	Commissioner of the Board of Control
8 February 1828	Cambridge	u	James Graham	James Graham	Commissioner of the Board of Control
6 February 1828	Durham City	c	Sir Henry Hardinge	Sir Henry Hardinge	Clerk of the Ordnance
6 February 1828	Armagh City	u	Henry Goulburn	Henry Goulburn	Chancellor of the Exchequer
5 February 1828	Liverpool	u	William Huskisson	William Huskisson	Secretary of State for War and the Colonies
5 February 1828	Ashburton	u	William Sturges Bourne	William Sturges Bourne	First Commissioner of Woods and Forests
4 February 1828	Oxford University	u	Robert Peel	Robert Peel	Home Secretary
4 February 1828	Haslemere	u	Sir John Beckett	Sir John Beckett	Judge Advocate General
4 February 1828	Harwich	u	John Charles Herries	John Charles Herries	Chancellor of the Exchequer
20 July 1827	County Kerry	u	Maurice FitzGerald	Maurice FitzGerald	Junior Lord of the Treasury
25 May 1827	Newport	u	William Lamb	Spencer Perceval	Chief Secretary for Ireland (Note: Lamb sought re-election at Bletchingley)
25 May 1827	Calne	u	James Abercromby	James Abercromby	Judge Advocate General
25 May 1827	Calne	u	Sir James Macdonald	Sir James Macdonald	Commissioner of the Board of Control
24 May 1827	Knaresborough	u	George Tierney	George Tierney	Master of the Mint
23 May 1827	Sutherland	u	Lord Francis Leveson-Gower	Lord Francis Leveson-Gower	Junior Lord of the Treasury
15 May 1827	Edinburghshire	u	Sir George Clerk	Sir George Clerk	Clerk of the Ordnance
10 May 1827	Sandwich	u	Sir Edward Owen	Sir Edward Owen	Surveyor-General of the Ordnance
9 May 1827	Peterborough	u	James Scarlett	James Scarlett	Attorney General for England and Wales
9 May 1827	Liskeard	u	Edward Eliot	Edward Eliot	Junior Lord of the Treasury
8 May 1827	Ashburton	u	William Sturges Bourne	William Sturges Bourne	Home Secretary
24 April 1827	Newport	u	George Canning	William Lamb	First Lord of the Treasury (Note: Canning sought re-election at Seaford)
16 December 1826	Cambridge University	u	Sir John Copley	Sir John Copley	Master of the Rolls
15 December 1826	Hastings	u	Sir Charles Wetherell	Evelyn Denison	Attorney General for England and Wales (Note: Wetherell sought re-election at Plympton Erle)
14 December 1826	Harwich	u	Nicholas Conyngham Tindal	Nicholas Conyngham Tindal	Solicitor General for England and Wales

=== 7th Parliament (1820–1826) ===
Date	Constituency	c/u	Former incumbent	Winner	Position
24 June 1824	Plympton Erle	u	John Henry North	John Henry North	King's Counsel
18 June 1824	Marlborough	u	James Brudenell	James Brudenell	Accepted a commission in the Army
8 March 1824	Barnstaple	c*	Michael Nolan	Frederick Hodgson	Chief Justice of the Brecon Circuit
4 March 1824	Dumfries Burghs	u	William Douglas	William Douglas	Lord of the Admiralty
11 February 1824	Weymouth and Melcombe Regis	u	Thomas Wallace	Thomas Wallace	Master of the Mint
11 February 1824	Ashburton	u	Sir John Copley	Sir John Copley	Attorney General for England and Wales
9 February 1824	Oxford	u	Charles Wetherell	Charles Wetherell	Solicitor General for England and Wales
11 April 1823	Inverness-shire	u	Charles Grant	Charles Grant	Vice-President of the Board of Trade
4 April 1823	Durham City	c	Sir Henry Hardinge	Sir Henry Hardinge	Clerk of the Ordnance
21 March 1823	Newport (Cornwall)	c	Jonathan Raine	Jonathan Raine	Chief Justice of the North Wales Circuit
18 February 1823	Chichester	c	William Huskisson	William Stephen Poyntz	Treasurer of the Navy
15 February 1823	Liverpool	c	George Canning	William Huskisson	Foreign Secretary (Note: Canning sought re-election at Harwich)
12 February 1823	St Germans	u	Charles Arbuthnot	Charles Arbuthnot	First Commissioner of Woods and Forests
11 February 1823	Ripon	u	F. J. Robinson	F. J. Robinson	Chancellor of the Exchequer
8 March 1822	Dumfries Burghs	u	William Douglas	William Douglas	Lord of the Admiralty
18 February 1822	Montgomeryshire	u	Charles Williams-Wynn	Charles Williams-Wynn	President of the Board of Control
14 February 1822	Dublin University	u	William Plunket	William Plunket	Attorney General for Ireland
13 February 1822	West Looe	u	Henry Goulburn	Henry Goulburn	Chief Secretary for Ireland
13 February 1822	St Mawes	u	Joseph Phillimore	Joseph Phillimore	Commissioner of the Board of Control
12 February 1822	Oxford University	u	Robert Peel	Robert Peel	Home Secretary
12 February 1822	Caernarvon Boroughs	u	Sir Charles Paget	Sir Charles Paget	Groom of the Bedchamber
11 February 1822	Buckingham	u	William Fremantle	William Fremantle	Commissioner of the Board of Control
4 April 1821	Bere Alston	u	George Percy	George Percy	Lord of the Bedchamber

=== 6th Parliament (1818–1820) ===
Date	Constituency	c/u	Former incumbent	Winner	Position
29 July 1819	Edinburgh	c	William Dundas	William Dundas	Keeper of Sasines
20 July 1819	Ashburton	u	John Copley	John Copley	Solicitor General for England and Wales
19 July 1819	Eye	u	Sir Robert Gifford	Sir Robert Gifford	Attorney General for England and Wales
17 July 1819	Milborne Port	c	Robert Casberd	Robert Casberd	Puisne Justice of the Brecon Circuit
24 June 1819	Heytesbury	u	William Scott	William Scott	Clerk of Patents and Registrar of Affidavits at the Court of Chancery
5 April 1819	Monmouthshire	u	Lord Granville Somerset	Lord Granville Somerset	Junior Lord of the Treasury
2 April 1819	Banffshire	u	James Duff	James Duff	Lord of the Bedchamber
29 March 1819	Orford	u	Edmond Alexander MacNaghten	Edmond Alexander MacNaghten	Junior Lord of the Treasury
17 March 1819	Carrickfergus	u	George Chichester	George Chichester	Accepted a commission in the Army
16 March 1819	Inverness-shire	u	Charles Grant	Charles Grant	Chief Secretary for Ireland
15 March 1819	Edinburghshire	u	Sir George Clerk	Sir George Clerk	Lord of the Admiralty
12 February 1819	Ashburton	u	John Copley	John Copley	Chief Justice of Chester

=== 5th Parliament (1812–1818) ===
Date	Constituency	c/u	Former incumbent	Winner	Position
1 May 1818	Yarmouth	u	John Leslie Foster	John Leslie Foster	Second Counsel to the Commissioners of Revenue in Ireland
7 March 1818	Southampton	u	George Henry Rose	William Chamberlayne	Clerk of the Parliaments (Note: George Henry Rose sought re-election at Christchurch)
6 February 1818	Cockermouth	u	Thomas Wallace	Thomas Wallace	Vice-President of the Board of Trade
3 February 1818	Ripon	u	F. J. Robinson	F. J. Robinson	Treasurer of the Navy
22 July 1817	Harwich	u	Nicholas Vansittart	Nicholas Vansittart	Chancellor of the Exchequer of Ireland
14 May 1817	Dorchester	u	Sir Samuel Shepherd	Sir Samuel Shepherd	Attorney General for England and Wales
10 February 1817	Londonderry City	u	Sir George Hill	Sir George Hill	Vice-Treasurer of Ireland
19 July 1816	Dunbartonshire	u	Archibald Colquhoun	Archibald Colquhoun	Lord Clerk Register
3 July 1816	Yarmouth	u	John Leslie Foster	John Leslie Foster	Advocate General for Ireland
12 June 1816	Milborne Port	u	Sir Edward Paget	Sir Edward Paget	Groom of the Bedchamber
12 June 1816	Liverpool	c	George Canning	George Canning	President of the Board of Control
7 June 1816	Mitchell	u	Thomas Hamilton	Thomas Hamilton	Commissioner of the Board of Control
29 May 1816	Monmouth Boroughs	u	Henry Somerset	Henry Somerset	Lord of the Admiralty
19 March 1816	Newport (Cornwall)	u	Jonathan Raine	Jonathan Raine	King's Counsel
18 November 1814	Newtown	u	Barrington Blachford	Barrington Blachford	Lord of the Admiralty
12 August 1814	Queen's County	u	William Wellesley-Pole	William Wellesley-Pole	Master of the Mint
10 August 1814	Edinburgh	u	William Dundas	William Dundas	Keeper of the Signet
8 August 1814	Chichester	u	William Huskisson	William Huskisson	First Commissioner of Woods and Forests
11 March 1814	Eye	u	Sir William Garrow	Sir William Garrow	Chief Justice of Chester
19 January 1814	Inverness Burghs	u	Charles Grant	Charles Grant	Junior Lord of the Treasury
27 November 1813	Cockermouth	u	William Lowther	Thomas Wallace	Junior Lord of the Treasury (Note: Lowther sought re-election at Westmorland)
12 November 1813	Ripon	u	F. J. Robinson	F. J. Robinson	Joint Paymaster of the Forces
21 July 1813	Okehampton	u	Thomas Graves	Thomas Graves	Lord of the Bedchamber
10 May 1813	Eye	u	Sir William Garrow	Sir William Garrow	Attorney General for England and Wales
24 April 1813	Orford	u	Edmond Alexander MacNaghten	Edmond Alexander MacNaghten	Lord of the Irish Treasury

=== 4th Parliament (1807–1812) ===
Date	Constituency	c/u	Former incumbent	Winner	Position
6 August 1812	Ashburton	u	Lord Charles Bentinck	Lord Charles Bentinck	Treasurer of the Household
6 August 1812	Ashburton	u	John Sullivan	John Sullivan	Commissioner of the Board of Control
15 Jul 1812	Bristol	c	Charles Bathurst	Richard Davis	Chancellor of the Duchy of Lancaster (Note: Bathurst sought re-election at Bodmin)
3 July 1812	Downton	u	Sir Thomas Plumer	Sir Thomas Plumer	Attorney General for England and Wales
30 May 1812	Old Sarum	u	Nicholas Vansittart	James Alexander	Chancellor of the Exchequer (Note: Vansittart sought re-election at East Grinstead)
20 April 1812	County Louth	u	Robert Jocelyn	Robert Jocelyn	Treasurer of the Household
1 April 1812	Lisburn	u	Francis Seymour-Conway	Francis Seymour-Conway	Vice-Chamberlain of the Household
7 March 1812	Plympton Erle	u	Viscount Castlereagh	Viscount Castlereagh	Foreign Secretary
15 January 1812	Queenborough	u	Richard Wellesley	Robert Moorsom	Junior Lord of the Treasury (Note: Richard Wellesley sought re-election at East Grinstead)
15 January 1812	Aldeburgh	u	John McMahon	John McMahon	Receiver and Paymaster of the Royal Bounty to Officers’ Widows
12 July 1811	Queen's County	u	William Wellesley-Pole	William Wellesley-Pole	Chancellor of the Irish Exchequer
17 June 1811	King's Lynn	u	Lord Walpole	Lord Walpole	Lord of the Admiralty
1 June 1811	Haslemere	u	Robert Ward	Robert Ward	Clerk of the Ordnance
15 May 1811	County Antrim	u	John Bruce Richard O'Neill	John Bruce Richard O'Neill	Constable of Dublin Castle
16 January 1811	County Limerick	c	William Odell	William Odell	Lord of the Irish Treasury
6 July 1810	Anglesey	u	Berkeley Paget	Berkeley Paget	Junior Lord of the Treasury
30 June 1810	Ripon	u	F. J. Robinson	F. J. Robinson	Lord of the Admiralty
28 Jun 1810	Bletchingley	u	William Kenrick	William Kenrick	Master of the Household
25 May 1810	St Germans	u	Charles Philip Yorke	Charles Philip Yorke	First Lord of the Admiralty
16 March 1810	Cambridgeshire	u	Charles Philip Yorke	Lord Francis Osborne	Teller of the Exchequer (Note: Yorke sought re-election at St Germans)
12 February 1810	Limerick City	u	Charles Vereker	Charles Vereker	Constable of Limerick Castle
9 February 1810	Queen's County	u	William Wellesley-Pole	William Wellesley-Pole	Chief Secretary for Ireland
5 February 1810	Ennis	u	William Fitzgerald	William Fitzgerald	Lord of the Irish Treasury
5 February 1810	Edinburghshire	u	Robert Dundas	Robert Dundas	President of the Board of Control
2 February 1810	Scarborough	u	Charles Manners-Sutton	Charles Manners-Sutton	Judge Advocate General
1 February 1810	Bossiney	u	John Otway Cuffe	John Otway Cuffe	Junior Lord of the Treasury
31 January 1810	Cockermouth	u	William Lowther	William Lowther	Lord of the Admiralty
30 January 1810	Tiverton	u	Richard Ryder	Richard Ryder	Home Secretary
29 January 1810	Newport	u	Henry John Temple	Henry John Temple	Secretary at War
29 January 1810	Dunwich	u	Snowdon Barne	Snowdon Barne	Junior Lord of the Treasury
7 July 1809	Staffordshire	u	Lord Granville Leveson-Gower	Lord Granville Leveson-Gower	Secretary at War
1 May 1809	Edinburghshire	u	Robert Dundas	Robert Dundas	Chief Secretary for Ireland
22 February 1808	Orford	u	Lord Henry Moore	Lord Henry Moore	Joint Muster Master General of the Forces in Ireland
29 January 1808	Tiverton	u	Richard Ryder	Richard Ryder	Junior Lord of the Treasury
28 January 1808	Whitchurch	u	William Brodrick	William Brodrick	Junior Lord of the Treasury
21 August 1807	Heytesbury	u	James Harris	James Harris	Governor of the Isle of Wight
20 July 1807	Grantham	u	Thomas Thoroton	Thomas Thoroton	Clerk of the Deliveries of the Ordnance
20 July 1807	Dorchester	u	Cropley Ashley-Cooper	Cropley Ashley-Cooper	Clerk of the Ordnance

=== 3rd Parliament (1806–1807) ===
Date	Constituency	c/u	Former incumbent	Winner	Position
1 May 1807	Dumfriesshire	u	William Johnstone Hope	William Johnstone Hope	Naval Lord
21 April 1807	Mitchell	u	Sir Arthur Wellesley	Sir Arthur Wellesley	Chief Secretary for Ireland
18 April 1807	Great Bedwyn	u	James Stopford	Sir Vicary Gibbs	Treasurer of the Household (Note: Stopford sought re-election at Marlborough)
17 April 1807	West Looe	u	James Buller	James Buller	Lord of the Admiralty
17 April 1807	Christchurch	u	George Rose	George Rose	Treasurer of the Navy
17 April 1807	Christchurch	u	William Sturges Bourne	William Sturges Bourne	Junior Lord of the Treasury
16 Apr 1807	Weymouth & Melcombe Regis	u	Sir James Pulteney	Sir James Pulteney	Secretary at War
15 April 1807	Liskeard	u	William Eliot	William Eliot	Junior Lord of the Treasury
15 April 1807	Haslemere	u	Robert Plumer Ward	Robert Plumer Ward	Lord of the Admiralty
14 April 1807	Dorchester	u	Cropley Ashley	Cropley Ashley	Clerk of the Deliveries of the Ordnance
13 April 1807	Queen's County	u	William Wellesley-Pole	William Wellesley-Pole	Clerk of the Ordnance
13 April 1807	Edinburghshire	u	Robert Dundas	Robert Dundas	President of the Board of Control
9 April 1807	Buckinghamshire	u	William Bentinck	William Bentinck	Junior Lord of the Treasury
6 April 1807	Monmouth Boroughs	u	Lord Charles Somerset	Lord Charles Somerset	Joint Paymaster of the Forces
4 April 1807	Bere Alston	u	George Percy	George Percy	Commissioner of the Board of Control
3 April 1807	Plympton Erle	u	Robert Stewart	Robert Stewart	Secretary of State for War and the Colonies
3 April 1807	Haslemere	u	Charles Long	Charles Long	Joint Paymaster of the Forces
1 April 1807	Northampton	u	Spencer Perceval	Spencer Perceval	Chancellor of the Exchequer
1 April 1807	Newtown	u	George Canning	George Canning	Foreign Secretary

=== 2nd Parliament (1802–1806) ===
Date	Constituency	c/u	Former incumbent	Winner	Position
14 July 1806	Buckingham	u	Thomas Grenville	Thomas Grenville	President of the Board of Control
17 June 1806	Honiton	c	Augustus Cavendish-Bradshaw	Augustus Cavendish-Bradshaw	Teller of the Exchequer of Ireland
10 May 1806	County Galway	u	Denis Bowes Daly	Denis Bowes Daly	Muster Master General in Ireland
18 April 1806	Queen's County	u	Henry Parnell	Henry Parnell	Lord of the Irish Treasury
17 April 1806	County Sligo	u	Charles O'Hara	Charles O'Hara	Lord of the Irish Treasury
11 April 1806	Peterborough	u	William Elliot	William Elliot	Chief Secretary for Ireland
15 March 1806	Corfe Castle	u	Nathaniel Bond	Nathaniel Bond	Judge Advocate General
14 March 1806	Waterford City	u	Sir John Newport	Sir John Newport	Resignation pending appointment as Chancellor of the Exchequer of Ireland
28 February 1806	Stafford	u	Richard Brinsley Sheridan	Richard Brinsley Sheridan	Treasurer of the Navy
27 February 1806	Cashel	u	William Wickham	William Wickham	Junior Lord of the Treasury
25 February 1806	Aldeburgh	u	John McMahon	John McMahon	Clerk of the Ordnance
25 February 1806	Knaresborough	u	Lord John Townshend	Lord John Townshend	Joint-Paymaster of the Forces
24 February 1806	Haverfordwest	u	William Edwardes	William Edwardes	Lord of the Admiralty
24 February 1806	Appleby	u	John Courtenay	John Courtenay	Junior Lord of the Treasury
22 February 1806	Surrey	u	Lord William Russell	Lord William Russell	Lord of the Admiralty
21 February 1806	Steyning	u	Charles Bennet	Charles Bennet	Treasurer of the Household
21 February 1806	Northumberland	u	Charles Grey	Charles Grey	First Lord of the Admiralty
20 February 1806	Wareham	u	John Calcraft	John Calcraft	Clerk of the Ordnance
19 February 1806	St Mawes	u	William Windham	William Windham	Secretary of State for War and the Colonies
19 February 1806	Portsmouth	u	John Markham	John Markham	Naval Lord
18 February 1806	Buckinghamshire	u	Earl Temple	Earl Temple	Joint-Paymaster of the Forces
17 February 1806	Tavistock	u	Lord Robert Spencer	Lord Robert Spencer	Resignation pending appointment as Surveyor General of Woods, Forests, Parks, and Chases
17 February 1806	Tavistock	u	Richard FitzPatrick	Richard FitzPatrick	Secretary at War
17 February 1806	Newark	u	Sir Charles Pole	Sir Charles Pole	Naval Lord
17 February 1806	Harwich	u	John Hiley Addington	John Hiley Addington	Commissioner of the Board of Control for India
17 February 1806	Calne	u	Lord Henry Petty	Osborne Markham	Chancellor of the Exchequer (Note: Petty sought re-election at Cambridge University)
15 February 1806	Okehampton	u	John Spencer	John Spencer	Junior Lord of the Treasury
15 February 1806	Morpeth	u	George Howard	George Howard	Commissioner of the Board of Control for India
13 February 1806	Westminster	u	Charles James Fox	Charles James Fox	Foreign Secretary
8 February 1806	Wendover	u	Charles Long	Charles Long	Chief Secretary for Ireland
27 January 1806	Dunwich	u	Snowdon Barne	Snowdon Barne	Lord Treasurer's Remembrancer of the Court of Exchequer
27 July 1805	Down	c	Viscount Castlereagh	John Meade	Secretary of State for War and the Colonies
6 April 1805	King's County	u	Sir Lawrence Parsons	Sir Lawrence Parsons	Lord of the Irish Treasury
1 April 1805	Old Sarum	u	Nicholas Vansittart	Nicholas Vansittart	Chief Secretary for Ireland
28 March 1805	Dublin University	c	George Knox	George Knox	Lord of the Irish Treasury
27 February 1805	Calne	u	Joseph Jekyll	Joseph Jekyll	King's Counsel
11 February 1805	Mitchell	u	Robert Dallas	Charles Montagu-Scott	Chief Justice of Chester (Note: Dallas sought re-election at the Dysart Burghs)
8 February 1805	Totnes	u	Vicary Gibbs	Vicary Gibbs	Solicitor General for England and Wales
4 February 1805	Peeblesshire	u	Sir James Montgomery	Sir James Montgomery	Lord Advocate
14 August 1804	Bridport	u	Sir Evan Nepean	Sir Evan Nepean	Lord of the Admiralty
6 August 1804	Louth County	u	John Foster	John Foster	Chancellor of the Exchequer of Ireland
4 August 1804	Tiverton	u	Richard Ryder	Richard Ryder	Second Justice of the South Wales circuit
4 August 1804	Christchurch	u	George Rose	George Rose	Paymaster of the Forces
28 July 1804	Tain Burghs	u	John Villiers	John Villiers	Prothonotary of common pleas, county of Lancaster
20 July 1804	Bath	u	Lord John Thynne	Lord John Thynne	Vice-Chamberlain of the Household
5 July 1804	Monmouth Boroughs	u	Lord Charles Somerset	Lord Charles Somerset	Paymaster of the Forces
4 June 1804	County Galway	u	Richard Trench	Richard Trench	Commissioner of the Board of Control for India
4 June 1804	Sutherland	u	William Dundas	William Dundas	Secretary at War
4 June 1804	Tralee	u	George Canning	George Canning	Treasurer of the Navy
26 May 1804	Lostwithiel	u	William Dickinson	William Dickinson	Lord of the Admiralty
26 May 1804	Helston	u	James Harris	Davies Giddy	Junior Lord of the Treasury (Note: FitzHarris sought re-election at Horsham)
26 May 1804	Christchurch	u	George Rose	George Rose	Paymaster of the Forces
22 May 1804	Weobley	u	Lord George Thynne	Lord George Thynne	Comptroller of the Household
22 May 1804	Bere Alston	u	George Percy	George Percy	Junior Lord of the Treasury
19 May 1804	Wendover	u	Charles Long	Charles Long	Junior Lord of the Treasury
17 May 1804	Cambridge University	u	William Pitt	William Pitt	First Lord of the Treasury and Chancellor of the Exchequer
17 February 1804	Bridport	u	Sir Evan Nepean	Sir Evan Nepean	Chief Secretary for Ireland
8 February 1804	Truro	u	John Lemon	John Lemon	Lord of the Admiralty
30 December 1803	Dorchester	u	Cropley Ashley	Cropley Ashley	Clerk of the Deliveries of the Ordnance
3 December 1803	Plympton Erle	c	Edward Golding	Edward Golding	Junior Lord of the Treasury
10 September 1803	Haddington Burghs	u	Thomas Maitland	Thomas Maitland	Commissioner of the Board of Control for India
22 August 1803	Cambridgeshire	u	Charles Philip Yorke	Charles Philip Yorke	Resignation pending appointment as Home Secretary
19 August 1803	Whitchurch	u	William Brodrick	William Brodrick	Junior Lord of the Treasury
16 August 1803	Bristol	u	Charles Bragge	Charles Bragge	Resignation pending appointment as Secretary at War
29 June 1803	Southwark	c	George Tierney	George Tierney	Treasurer of the Navy
11 February 1803	Hastings	u	Sylvester Douglas	Sylvester Douglas	Surveyor General of Woods, Forests, Parks, and Chases

=== 1st Parliament (1801–1802) ===
Date	Constituency	c/u	Former incumbent	Winner	Position
8 May 1802	Newark	u	Thomas Manners-Sutton	Thomas Manners-Sutton	Solicitor General for England and Wales
19 April 1802	Northampton	u	Spencer Perceval	Spencer Perceval	Attorney General for England and Wales
23 November 1801	Bristol	u	Charles Bragge	Charles Bragge	Treasurer of the Navy
15 June 1801	Banffshire	u	Sir William Grant	Sir William Grant	Master of the Rolls
9 June 1801	Lymington	u	Sir Harry Neale	Sir Harry Neale	Groom of the Bedchamber
22 May 1801	Helston	u	Charles Abbot	Charles Abbot	Chief Secretary for Ireland
12 May 1801	Poole	u	George Garland	George Garland	Sought re-election due to holding an Admiralty contract
24 March 1801	Weobley	u	Lord George Thynne	Lord George Thynne	Junior Lord of the Treasury
23 March 1801	Corfe Castle	u	Nathaniel Bond	Nathaniel Bond	Junior Lord of the Treasury
21 March 1801	Devizes	u	Henry Addington	Henry Addington	First Lord of the Treasury and Chancellor of the Exchequer
5 March 1801	Kerry	u	Maurice FitzGerald	Maurice FitzGerald	Lord of the Irish Treasury
3 March 1801	Cambridgeshire	u	Charles Philip Yorke	Charles Philip Yorke	Secretary at War
2 March 1801	Armagh City	u	Patrick Duigenan	Patrick Duigenan	Commissioner of Union Compensation
27 February 1801	Totnes	u	The Baron Arden	The Baron Arden	Master of the Mint
25 February 1801	Weymouth & Melcombe Regis	u	William Garthshore	William Garthshore	Lord of the Admiralty
25 February 1801	Rye	u	Lord Hawkesbury	Lord Hawkesbury	Foreign Secretary
25 February 1801	Bramber	u	James Adams	James Adams	Lord of the Admiralty
21 February 1801	Northampton	u	Spencer Perceval	Spencer Perceval	Solicitor General for England and Wales
20 February 1801	Kinsale	u	William Rowley	William Rowley	Commissioner of Irish Revenue
9 February 1801	Cambridge	u	Robert Manners	Robert Manners	Chief Equerry and Clerk Marshal

== See also ==
- List of ministerial by-elections to the Parliament of Great Britain (pre-1801)
