= 1917 Chesterton by-election =

Unopposed by-election for the British House of Commons

The 1917 Chesterton by-election was a parliamentary by-election held on 27 July 1917 for the British House of Commons constituency of Chesterton also known as the Western Division of Cambridgeshire.

== Vacancy ==
The by-election was caused by the appointment of the sitting Liberal MP, the Rt. Hon. Edwin Montagu as Secretary of State for India. Under the Parliamentary rules of the day he had to resign and fight a by-election.

== Candidates ==
Montagu was re-selected to fight the seat by his local Liberal Association and as the wartime truce between the political parties was in operation no opposing candidate was nominated against him.

== The result ==
There being no other candidates putting themselves forward Montagu was returned unopposed.

Chesterton by-election, 1917
Party	Candidate	Votes	%	±%
Liberal	Edwin Samuel Montagu	Unopposed	N/A	N/A
Liberal hold				

== See also ==
- List of United Kingdom by-elections
- United Kingdom by-election records
- 1916 Chesterton by-election
- 1915 Chesterton by-election
