= India Office =

British government department in London (established 1858)

Coordinates: 51°30′09.9″N 0°07′45.26″W

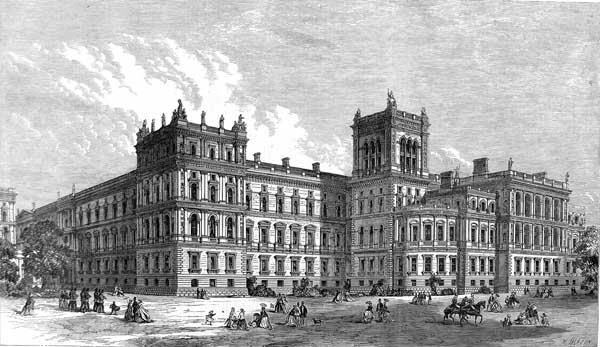
The western or park end of the Foreign, Commonwealth and Development Office's building in 1866. It was then occupied by the Foreign and India Offices, while the Home and Colonial Offices occupied the Whitehall end.

The India Office was a British government department in London established in 1858 to oversee the administration of crown rule in India and its presidencies and provinces, through the British viceroy and other officials. The administered territories comprised most of the modern-day nations of the Indian Subcontinent as well as Yemen and other territories around the Indian Ocean. The India Office was headed by the Secretary of State for India, a member of the British cabinet, who was formally advised by the Council of India.

Upon the independence of India in 1947 into the new independent dominions of India and Pakistan, the India Office was closed down. Responsibility for the United Kingdom's relations with the new countries was transferred to the Commonwealth Relations Office (formerly the Dominions Office).

== Origins of the India Office (1600–1858) ==
The East India Company was established in 1600 as a joint-stock company of English merchants who received, by a series of charters, exclusive rights to English trade with the "Indies", defined as the lands lying between the Cape of Good Hope and the Straits of Magellan; the term "India" had been derived from the name of the Indus River, long important to commerce and civilisation in the region. The company soon established a network of "factories" throughout the south and east Indies in Asia. Over a period of 250 years the Company underwent several substantial changes in its basic character and functions.

A period of rivalry between the Old and New Companies after 1698 resulted in the formation in 1709 of the United Company of Merchants Trading to the East Indies. This 'new' East India Company was transformed during the second half of the 18th century from a mainly commercial body with scattered Asian trading interests into a major territorial power in South Asia with its headquarters in Bengal, present day state of West Bengal of India and Bangladesh. The political implications of this development eventually caused the British government in 1784 to institute standing commissioners (the Board of Control) in London to exercise supervision over the Company's Indian policies.

This change in the company's status, along with other factors, led to the acts of Parliament of 1813 and 1833, which opened British trade with the East Indies to all shipping and resulted in the company's complete withdrawal from its commercial functions. The company continued to exercise responsibility, under the supervision of the board, for the government of British India until the re-organisation of 1858.

Throughout most of these changes the basic structure of company organisation in East India House in the City of London remained largely unaltered, comprising a large body of proprietors or shareholders and an elected court of directors, headed by a chairman and deputy chairman who, aided by permanent officials, were responsible for the daily conduct of company business. The Board of Control maintained its separate office close to the government buildings in Westminster.

With the Government of India Act 1858, the Company and the Board of Control of the East India Companies were replaced by a single new department of state in London, the India Office, which functioned, under the Secretary of State for India, as an executive office of United Kingdom government alongside the Foreign Office, Colonial Office, Home Office and War Office.

== Description and functions ==
The Secretary of State for India was assisted by a statutory body of advisors, the Council of India, and headed a staff of civil servants organised into a system of departments largely taken over from the East India Company and Board of Control establishments, and housed in a new India Office building in Whitehall. The Secretary of State for India inherited all the executive functions previously carried out by the Company, and all the powers of 'superintendence, direction and control' over the British provincial administrations in South Asia previously exercised by the Board of Control. Improved communications with South Asia – the overland and submarine telegraph cables (1868–70), and the opening of the Suez Canal (1869) – rendered this control, exercised through the Viceroy and provincial Governors covering large areas in the regions of Asia, Africa and the Middle East, more effective in the last quarter of the nineteenth century. It was only with the constitutional reforms initiated during the First World War, and carried forward by the India Acts of 1919 and 1935, that there came about a significant relaxation of India Office supervision over the Government of British India, and with it, in South Asia, a gradual devolution of authority to legislative bodies and local governments. The same administrative reforms also led in 1937 to the separation of Burma from rest of South Asia and the creation in London of the Burma Office, separate from the India Office though sharing the same Secretary of State and located in the same building. With the gradual events and establishments of sovereign independent nations and the final grant of independence to present-day India and Pakistan in 1947, and to present-day Myanmar in 1948, both the India Office and the Burma Office were officially dissolved.

As a result of the widespread involvement in the external relations and defence policy of pre-1947 African, Asian and Middle Eastern countries, the India Office was also responsible for particular neighbouring or connected areas at different times. Among the most significant of these are:

- Zanzibar, Somalia and Ethiopia (mainly nineteenth century);
- Red Sea, Arabian Peninsula, Persian Gulf states, Iraq and Iran (1858–1947);
- Afghanistan, Russian and Chinese Central Asia, Tibet, Nepal, Bhutan and Sikkim (1858-1947);
- Malaya and South-East Asia (1858-1867)

Other groups of involvement have also resulted from India Office interest in the status of Indian emigrants to the West Indies, south and east Africa, and Fiji.

The India Office had its offices in the Foreign, Commonwealth and Development Office Main Building in Whitehall.

== Timeline ==
1600 – Governor and Company of Merchants of London trading with the East Indies. established in London
1709 – British East India Company emerges as union of England and Scotland is born.
1757 – East India Company begins conquering Indian territory after the Battle of Plassey.
1765 – Mughal Emperor grants the right to collect land revenue to the East India Company.
1773 – Warren Hastings appointed as first Governor of Bengal.
1784 – British Government establishes Board of Control for India in London.
1813 – End of East India Company's monopoly rights over trade with British India with the Charter Act 1813
1833 – End of East India Company's monopoly rights over trade with China
1857 – Indian Rebellion of 1857 changes local opinion of the British.
1858 – East India Company and Board of Control replaced by India Office and Council of India in the Government of India Act 1858.
1937 – Separation of Burma from British India and establishment of Burma Office.
1947 – Dominion of India and Dominion of Pakistan. Dominion status granted to both countries. India wishes to stay in the commonwealth. Abolition of India Office.
1948 – Independence of Burma and abolition of Burma Office

== India Office Records ==
The India Office Records are the repository of the archives of the East India Company (1600–1858), the Board of Control or Board of Commissioners for the Affairs of British India (1784–1858), the India Office (1858–1947), the Burma Office (1937–1948), and a number of related British agencies overseas which were officially linked with one or other of the four main bodies. The focus of the India Office Records is in the territories mainly that today include Central Asia, the Middle East, regions of Africa, South Asia, Southeast Asia and their administration before 1947. The official archives of the India Office Records are complemented by over 300 collections and over 3,000 smaller deposits of Private Papers relating to the British experience in India.

The India Office Records, previously housed in the India Office Library, became the responsibility of the British Library Board in 1982, and are now administered as part of the Asia, Pacific and Africa Collections of the British Library, London, as part of the Public Records of the United Kingdom. They are open for public consultation, except for recent personal files, and a very small number of subject files. They comprise 14 kilometres of shelves of volumes, files and boxes of papers, together with 70,000 volumes of official publications and 105,000 manuscript and printed maps.

== See also ==
- Secretary of State for India
- Under-Secretary of State for India
- Governor-General of India
- History of India
- History of Bengal
