= Hugh Hoare (Liberal politician) =

British brewer and politician

- Hugh Edward Hoare

Member of Parliament for the Western or Chesterton Division of Cambridgeshire
- In office 1892-1895

Personal details
- Born: 26 March 1854
- Died: 15 July 1929 (aged 75) Henley on Thames, Oxfordshire, England
- Party: Liberal
- Parent: Henry Hoare (father)
- Relatives: Angelina Hoare (sister); Charles Marsham (grandfather)
- Education: Balliol College, Oxford
- Occupation: Brewer

Hugh Edward Hoare (26 March 1854 – 15 July 1929) was a British brewer and Liberal politician.

== Biography ==
He was the sixth son of Henry Hoare, banker, of Iden Park, Staplehurst, Kent and his wife Mary Lady Marsham, daughter of the 2nd Earl of Romney. He was educated at Eton College and matriculated at Balliol College, Oxford in 1872.

Hoare was partner in the brewery company of Hoare and Company, Lower East Smithfield, and was on the boards of the New England Breweries and the United States Brewery Company. His interest in public affairs led to his election to the London School Board.

At the 1892 general election he was elected as Liberal Member of Parliament for the Western or Chesterton Division of Cambridgeshire, taking the seat from the Conservatives. He failed to hold the seat at the subsequent election in 1895 or regain it in 1900. He was again unsuccessful when he stood at Chelsea in December 1910.

He retired from politics, and devoted himself to his brewing interests and also became a director of the National Provident Institution. He died suddenly at his residence, Bix Hall, Henley on Thames, Oxfordshire in July 1929, aged 75.

Parliament of the United Kingdom
Preceded by Sir Charles Hall	Member of Parliament for Chesterton; 1892 – 1895	Succeeded by Raymond Greene
