= Chesterton (constituency) =

Parliamentary constituency in the United Kingdom, 1885–1918

- Former county constituency for the House of Commons

1885–1918
- Seats: one
- Created from: Cambridgeshire
- Replaced by: Cambridgeshire; Isle of Ely

Chesterton is a former United Kingdom Parliamentary constituency. It was created upon the splitting up of the three member Cambridgeshire constituency into three single member divisions in 1885. The seat was abolished in 1918 when Cambridgeshire was recreated as a single-member constituency.

== Boundaries ==
The Redistribution of Seats Act 1885 split the former three-member Cambridgeshire parliamentary county into three single-member divisions. One of these was the Western or Chesterton Division, and the other two were Newmarket and Wisbech.

The contents of the division were defined as:

- The Municipal Borough of Cambridge;
- The Sessional Divisions of Arrington and Melbourn, Cambridge and Caxton; and
- The Parishes of Grunty Fen, Haddenham, Mepal, Stretham, Sutton, Thetford, Wentworth, Wilburton, Witcham and Witchford.

Only non-resident freeholders of the Municipal Borough of Cambridge were entitled to vote.

The seat was named after the town of Chesterton, the only urban area in the constituency, and a suburb of the university town of Cambridge. The built-up area of Chesterton was included within the municipal boundaries of Cambridge in 1912, but this did not affect the constituency.

The remainder of the constituency consisted of the following civil parishes: Abington Pigotts, Arrington, Barrington, Bartlow, Barton, Bassingbourn, Bourn, Boxworth, Caldecote, Caxton, Childerley, Comberton, Conington, Coton, Cottenham, Croxton, Croydon, Dry Drayton, East Hatley, Elsworth, Eltisley, Fowlmere, Foxton, Gamlingay, Girton, Grantchester, Graveley, Great Eversden, Great Shelford, Grunty Fen, Guilden Morden, Haddenham, Hardwick, Harlton, Harston, Haslingfield, Hatley St George, Hauxton, Histon, Impington, Kingston, Knapwell, Kneesworth, Landbeach, Litlington, Little Eversden, Little Gransden, Little Shelford, Lolworth, Long Stanton All Saints, Long Stanton St Michael, Longstowe, Madingley, Melbourn, Meldreth, Mepal, Milton, Newton, Oakington, Orwell, Over, Papworth Everard, the part of Papworth St Agnes in Cambridgeshire, Rampton, the part of Royston in Cambridgeshire, Shepreth, Shingay, Stapleford, Steeple Morden, Stretham, Sutton, Swavesey, Tadlow, Thetford, Thriplow, Toft, Trumpington, Waterbeach, Wendy, Wentworth, Westwick, Whaddon, Wilburton, Willingham, Wimpole, Witcham and Witchford.

Upon its abolition under the Representation of the People Act 1918, the majority of the constituency was combined with the Newmarket (or East Cambridgeshire) division to create a new single member Cambridgeshire seat. Chesterton and areas to the south of Cambridge, which had been added to the Municipal Borough of Cambridge, were now included in the Parliamentary Borough of Cambridge. Northernmost parts were included in the new Isle of Ely constituency.

== Members of Parliament ==
Election	Member	Party
part of Cambridgeshire prior to 1885
1885	Sir Charles Hall	Conservative
1892	Hugh Hoare	Liberal
1895	Walter Greene	Conservative
1906	Edwin Montagu	Liberal
1916	Edwin Montagu	Coalition Liberal
1918	constituency abolished, Cambridgeshire and part of Isle of Ely from 1918	

== Election results ==
=== Elections in the 1880s ===
General election 1885: Chesterton
Party	Candidate	Votes	%
Conservative	Charles Hall	4,246	50.5
Liberal	Neville Goodman	4,161	49.5
Majority		85	1.0
Turnout		8,407	80.3
Registered electors		10,465	
Conservative win (new seat)			

General election 1886: Chesterton
Party	Candidate	Votes	%	±%
Conservative	Charles Hall	4,248	56.5	+6.0
Liberal	Clarence Smith	3,272	43.5	−6.0
Majority		976	13.0	+12.0
Turnout		7,520	71.9	−8.4
Registered electors		10,465		
Conservative hold		Swing	+6.0	

=== Elections in the 1890s ===
Hoare

General election 1892: Chesterton
Party	Candidate	Votes	%	±%
Liberal	Hugh Hoare	4,350	52.4	+8.9
Conservative	Charles Hall	3,952	47.6	−8.9
Majority		398	4.8	N/A
Turnout		8,302	76.3	+4.4
Registered electors		10,880		
Liberal gain from Conservative		Swing	+8.9	

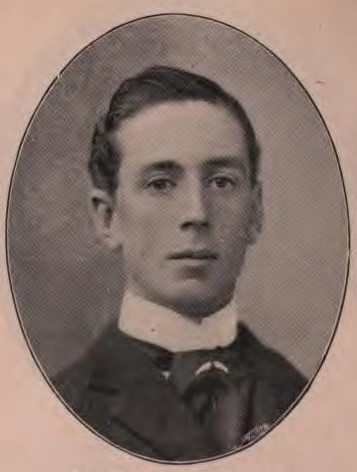
Raymond Greene

General election 1895: Chesterton
Party	Candidate	Votes	%	±%
Conservative	Walter Greene	4,432	52.5	+4.9
Liberal	Hugh Hoare	4,012	47.5	−4.9
Majority		420	5.0	N/A
Turnout		8,444	79.3	+3.0
Registered electors		10,651		
Conservative gain from Liberal		Swing	+4.9	

=== Elections in the 1900s ===
General election 1900: Chesterton
Party	Candidate	Votes	%	±%
Conservative	Walter Greene	4,190	51.4	−1.1
Liberal	Hugh Hoare	3,961	48.6	+1.1
Majority		229	2.8	−2.2
Turnout		8,151	77.2	−2.1
Registered electors		10,554		
Conservative hold		Swing	−1.1	

Edwin Montagu

General election 1906: Chesterton
Party	Candidate	Votes	%	±%
Liberal	Edwin Montagu	4,829	52.8	+4.2
Conservative	Walter Greene	4,316	47.2	−4.2
Majority		513	5.6	N/A
Turnout		9,145	88.1	+10.9
Registered electors		10,386		
Liberal gain from Conservative		Swing	+4.2	

=== Elections in the 1910s ===
General election January 1910: Chesterton
Party	Candidate	Votes	%	±%
Liberal	Edwin Montagu	5,240	52.5	−0.3
Conservative	Eustace Widdrington Morrison-Bell	4,735	47.5	+0.3
Majority		505	5.0	−0.6
Turnout		9,975	91.9	+3.8
Liberal hold		Swing	−0.3	

General election December 1910: Chesterton
Party	Candidate	Votes	%	±%
Liberal	Edwin Montagu	5,011	51.9	−0.6
Conservative	George Newton	4,640	48.1	+0.6
Majority		371	3.8	−1.2
Turnout		9,651	88.9	−3.0
Liberal hold		Swing	−0.6	

- Montagu was subsequently returned unopposed in three by-elections: in 1915 and 1916 upon his appointment as Chancellor of the Duchy of Lancaster, and in 1917 when he was appointed Secretary of State for India

== See also ==
- Parliamentary representation from Cambridgeshire
- List of former United Kingdom Parliament constituencies
