= India Board =

Former United Kingdom governmental arm

The Board of Commissioners for the Affairs of India (commonly known as the India Board or the Board of Control) was an arm of the Government of the United Kingdom responsible for managing the government's interest in British India and the East India Company between 1784 and 1858. By virtue of the East India Company Act 1784 (also known as Pitt's India Act), Privy Counsellors, not exceeding six in number, were appointed by commission issued under the Great Seal of Great Britain to be "Commissioners for the Affairs of India". The commissioners were to include a Secretary of State and the Chancellor of the Exchequer. At least three of the commissioners were to form the board, which exercised powers under the act. The board was supported by the Secretary to the Board of Control.

It was abolished by the Government of India Act 1858 and replaced by the India Office.
