= 1916 Chesterton by-election =

UK parliamentary by-election

The 1916 Chesterton by-election was a parliamentary by-election held for the British House of Commons constituency of the Chesterton or Western Division of Cambridgeshire on 20 January 1916.

== Vacancy ==
The by-election was caused by the re-appointment of the sitting Liberal MP, the Rt. Hon. Edwin Montagu as Chancellor of the Duchy of Lancaster. Montagu had held this post briefly in 1915 but was replaced after three months by Winston Churchill on the formation of H H Asquith’s wartime coalition government. At that time he became Financial Secretary to the Treasury a post he had previously held in 1914-15. He now continued to hold the post of Financial Secretary as well as that of Chancellor of the Duchy of Lancaster. However under the Parliamentary rules of the day had to resign and fight a by-election.

== Candidates ==
Montagu was re-selected to fight the seat by his local Liberal Association and as the wartime truce between the political parties was in operation no opposing candidate was nominated against him.

== The result ==
There being no other candidates putting themselves forward Montagu was returned unopposed.

Chesterton by-election, 1916
Party	Candidate	Votes	%	±%
Liberal	Edwin Samuel Montagu	Unopposed	N/A	N/A
Liberal hold				

== See also ==
- List of United Kingdom by-elections
- United Kingdom by-election records
- 1915 Chesterton by-election
- 1917 Chesterton by-election
