= 1915 Chesterton by-election =

UK parliamentary by-election

The 1915 Chesterton by-election was a parliamentary by-election held for the British House of Commons constituency of the Chesterton or Western Division of Cambridgeshire on 13 February 1915.

== Vacancy ==
The by-election was caused by the appointment of the sitting Liberal MP, the Rt. Hon. Edwin Montagu as Chancellor of the Duchy of Lancaster with a seat in the Cabinet. Under the Parliamentary rules of the day he had to resign and fight a by-election.

== Candidates ==
Montagu was re-selected to fight the seat by his local Liberal Association and as the wartime truce between the political parties was in operation no opposing candidate was nominated against him.

== The result ==
There being no other candidates putting themselves forward Montagu was returned unopposed.

Chesterton by-election, 1915
Party	Candidate	Votes	%	±%
Liberal	Edwin Samuel Montagu	Unopposed	N/A	N/A
Liberal hold				

== See also ==
- List of United Kingdom by-elections
- United Kingdom by-election records
- 1916 Chesterton by-election
