= Dublin University (constituency) =

University constituency in Ireland

- University constituency for the Seanad Éireann

Current constituency
- Created: 1938
- Seats: 3
- Senators: Tom Clonan (Ind); Aubrey McCarthy (Ind); Lynn Ruane (Ind)

Dublin University is a university constituency in Ireland, which elects three senators to Seanad Éireann, the upper house of the Oireachtas (the legislature of Ireland). Its electorate comprises the undergraduate scholars and graduates of the University of Dublin, whose sole constituent college is Trinity College Dublin, so it is often also referred to as the Trinity College constituency. Between 1613 and 1937 it elected MPs or TDs to a series of representative legislative bodies.

== Representation ==
From	To	Chamber	Members
1613	1800	House of Commons of Ireland	2
1801	1832	House of Commons of the United Kingdom	1
1832	1922	House of Commons of the United Kingdom	2
1921	1922	House of Commons of Southern Ireland	4
1922	1923	Dáil Éireann	4
1923	1937	Dáil Éireann	3
1938	present	Seanad Éireann	3

=== House of Commons of Ireland (1613–1800) ===
Dublin University
- Former university constituency for the Irish House of Commons

Former constituency
- Created: 1613
- Abolished: 1801

When James I first convened the Parliament of Ireland, the University of Dublin was given two MPs, elected by the Provost, Fellows and Scholars of Trinity College. It was not represented among the 30 Irish MPs which were part of the Protectorate Parliament during the Commonwealth of England, Scotland and Ireland.

Party organisations were not persistent during this time period, and have been added where appropriate. Among the MPs for the university in this period was John FitzGibbon, who later as Lord Chancellor of Ireland played a key role in the passage of the Acts of Union 1800, which merged the Kingdom of Ireland with the Kingdom of Great Britain to create the United Kingdom of Great Britain and Ireland.

Parliament	Election	MP (Party)	MP (Party)
Parliament of James I	1613	William Temple	Charles Doyne
Parliament of James I	1628	William Bedell	James Donnellan
Parliament of James I	1628	William Fitzgerald	James Donnellan
First Parliament of Charles I	1634	Sir James Ware	James Donnellan
Second Parliament of Charles I	1639	Sir James Ware	William Gilbert
First Protectorate Parliament	1654	University not represented	
Parliament of Charles II	1661	Sir James Ware	John Butler
Parliament of James II	1689	Sir John Meade, Bt	Joseph Coghlan
First Parliament of William III and Mary II	1692	Sir Cyril Wyche	William Molyneux (Whig)
Second Parliament of William III	1695	Richard Aldworth	William Molyneux (Whig)
Second Parliament of William III	1698	Richard Aldworth	William Crow
First Parliament of Anne	1703	Sir William Robinson	Edward Southwell
Second Parliament of Anne	1713	Marmaduke Coghill (Whig)	John Elwood
Parliament of George I	1715	Marmaduke Coghill (Whig)	Samuel Dopping
Parliament of George I	1721	Marmaduke Coghill (Whig)	Edward Hopkins
Parliament of George II	1727	Marmaduke Coghill (Whig)	Samuel Molyneux
Parliament of George II	1728	Marmaduke Coghill (Whig)	John Elwood
Parliament of George II	1739	Philip Tisdall	John Elwood
Parliament of George II	1741	Philip Tisdall	Archibald Acheson
First Parliament of George III	1761	Philip Tisdall	William Clement
Second Parliament of George III	1768	Philip Tisdall	Sir Capel Molyneaux, Bt
Third Parliament of George III	1776	Walter Hussey Burgh (Patriot)	Richard Hely-Hutchinson (Note: Election deemed invalid.)
Third Parliament of George III	1778	Walter Hussey Burgh (Patriot)	John FitzGibbon
Third Parliament of George III	1782	Lawrence Parsons (Patriot)	John FitzGibbon
Fourth Parliament of George III	1783	Lawrence Parsons (Patriot)	Arthur Browne
Fifth Parliament of George III	1790	Francis Hely-Hutchinson	Arthur Browne
Sixth Parliament of George III	1797	George Knox	Arthur Browne

=== House of Commons of the United Kingdom (1801–1922) ===
Dublin University
- Former university constituency for the House of Commons

1801–1922
- Seats: 1 (1801–1832); 2 (1832–1918)

The Acts of Union 1800 merged the Parliament of Ireland with the Parliament of Great Britain, to form the Parliament of the United Kingdom. The 300 seats in the Irish House of Commons were reduced to 100 Irish members in the House of Commons of the United Kingdom. The union took effect on 1 January 1801. The University of Dublin had one seat in this Parliament. There was no new election for the First Parliament of the United Kingdom: for constituencies like the University of Dublin which were reduced to one MP, they were chosen by lot, in this instance, George Knox.

In the Representation of the People (Ireland) Act 1832, the university was given a second seat in Parliament, elected by plurality-at-large, and the franchise was extended to all those with a Master of Arts degree. At this stage, there were 2,073 voters on the register. Plural voting, by those who held a vote in the university constituency and also in a geographical one, was allowed and prevalent.

A Topographical Directory of Ireland, published in 1837, describes the parliamentary history of the university.

By charter of James I. the university returned two members to the Irish parliament till the Union; after which time it returned only one member to the Imperial parliament, till the recent Reform act, since which it has returned two. The right of election, which was originally vested solely in the provost, fellows, and scholars, has, by the same act, been extended to all members of the age of 21 years, who had obtained, or should hereafter obtain, a fellowship, scholarship, or the degree of Master of Arts, and whose names should be on the college books : members thus qualified, who had removed their names from the books, were allowed six months to restore them, on paying a fee of £2, and such as continued their names, merely to qualify them to vote, pay annually to the college the sum of £1, or a composition of £5 in lieu of annual payment. The number of names restored under this provision was 3005, and at present the constituency amounts to 3135. The provost is the returning officer.

The Representation of the People Act 1918 extended the electorate to include all male graduates and scholars over the age of 21 and all female graduates and scholars over the age of 30, to be elected by single transferable vote. There were 4,541 voters registered for the 1918 general election. Plural voting continued to be allowed.

During the period of the Union between Ireland and Great Britain, the constituency predominantly elected Tory, Conservative and Unionist MPs, including Edward Gibson, who was later (as Lord Ashbourne) responsible for the Purchase of Land (Ireland) Act 1885, and Edward Carson, who led the Irish Unionist Alliance.

Dublin University was represented in the House of Commons until the dissolution of Parliament on 26 October 1922, shortly before the establishment of the Irish Free State became a dominion on 6 December 1922.

Election	MP (Party)	MP (Party)
1801	George Knox (T)	University represented by one seat until 1832
1802	George Knox (T)	University represented by one seat until 1832
1806	George Knox (T)	University represented by one seat until 1832
1807	John Leslie Foster (T)	University represented by one seat until 1832
1812	William Plunket (W)	University represented by one seat until 1832
1818	William Plunket (W)	University represented by one seat until 1832
1820	William Plunket (W)	University represented by one seat until 1832
1822 by-election	William Plunket (W)	University represented by one seat until 1832
1826	William Plunket (W)	University represented by one seat until 1832
1827 by-election	John Wilson Croker (T)	University represented by one seat until 1832
1830	Thomas Langlois Lefroy (T, C)	University represented by one seat until 1832
1831	Thomas Langlois Lefroy (T, C)	University represented by one seat until 1832
1832	Thomas Langlois Lefroy (T, C)	Frederick Shaw (T, C)
1835	Thomas Langlois Lefroy (T, C)	Frederick Shaw (T, C)
1837	Thomas Langlois Lefroy (T, C)	Frederick Shaw (T, C)
1841	Thomas Langlois Lefroy (T, C)	Frederick Shaw (T, C)
1842 by-election	Joseph Devonsher Jackson (C)	Frederick Shaw (T, C)
1843 by-election	George Alexander Hamilton (C)	Frederick Shaw (T, C)
1847	George Alexander Hamilton (C)	Frederick Shaw (T, C)
1848 by-election	George Alexander Hamilton (C)	Joseph Napier (C)
1852 by-election	George Alexander Hamilton (C)	Joseph Napier (C)
1852	George Alexander Hamilton (C)	Joseph Napier (C)
1857	George Alexander Hamilton (C)	Joseph Napier (C)
1858 by-election	George Alexander Hamilton (C)	Anthony Lefroy (C)
1859 by-election	James Whiteside (C)	Anthony Lefroy (C)
1859	James Whiteside (C)	Anthony Lefroy (C)
1865	James Whiteside (C)	Anthony Lefroy (C)
1866 by-election	John Edward Walsh (C)	Anthony Lefroy (C)
Feb. 1867 by-election	Hedges Eyre Chatterton (C)	Anthony Lefroy (C)
Mar. 1867 by-election	Hedges Eyre Chatterton (C)	Anthony Lefroy (C)
Aug. 1867 by-election	Robert Warren (C)	Anthony Lefroy (C)
1868	John Thomas Ball (C)	Anthony Lefroy (C)
1870 by-election	John Thomas Ball (C)	David Plunket (C, U)
1874	John Thomas Ball (C)	David Plunket (C, U)
1874 by-election	John Thomas Ball (C)	David Plunket (C, U)
Jan. 1875 by-election	Edward Gibson (C)	David Plunket (C, U)
Feb. 1875 by-election	Edward Gibson (C)	David Plunket (C, U)
1877 by-election	Edward Gibson (C)	David Plunket (C, U)
1880	Edward Gibson (C)	David Plunket (C, U)
1885 by-election	Hugh Holmes (C, U)	David Plunket (C, U)
1885	Hugh Holmes (C, U)	David Plunket (C, U)
1886	Hugh Holmes (C, U)	David Plunket (C, U)
1886 by-election	Hugh Holmes (C, U)	David Plunket (C, U)
1887 by-election	Dodgson Hamilton Madden (U)	David Plunket (C, U)
1888 by-election	Dodgson Hamilton Madden (U)	David Plunket (C, U)
1892	Edward Carson (U)	David Plunket (C, U)
1895	Edward Carson (U)	David Plunket (C, U)
1895 by-election	Edward Carson (U)	W. E. H. Lecky (Lib U)
1900	Edward Carson (U)	W. E. H. Lecky (Lib U)
1903 by-election	Edward Carson (U)	James Campbell (U)
1906	Edward Carson (U)	James Campbell (U)
Jan. 1910	Edward Carson (U)	James Campbell (U)
1900 by-election	Edward Carson (U)	James Campbell (U)
Dec. 1910	Edward Carson (U)	James Campbell (U)
1916 by-election	Edward Carson (U)	James Campbell (U)
Feb. 1917 by-election	Edward Carson (U)	Arthur Samuels (U)
Oct. 1917 by-election	Edward Carson (U)	Arthur Samuels (U)
1918	Robert Woods (Ind U)	Arthur Samuels (U)
1919 by-election	Robert Woods (Ind U)	William Jellett (U)

=== House of Commons of Southern Ireland (1921–1922) ===
The Government of Ireland Act 1920 established a devolved home rule legislature, within the United Kingdom, for twenty-six Irish counties which were designated Southern Ireland.

Dublin University was given four seats in the House of Commons of Southern Ireland. The seats were filled by Independent Unionist MPs who were returned unopposed. They were the only MPs who attended the abortive first meeting of the House. After the signing of the Anglo-Irish Treaty, the four MPs met with the Pro-Treaty members of the Second Dáil to ratify the Treaty. The Parliament was formally dissolved as part of the arrangements under the Treaty and the establishment of the Irish Free State on 6 December 1922.

=== Dáil Éireann (1918–1937) ===
Sinn Féin contested the 1918 Westminster election on the basis that they would not take seats in the United Kingdom Parliament but would establish a revolutionary assembly in Dublin.

The university was entitled to return two Teachtaí Dála (known in English as Deputies and abbreviated as TDs) in 1918 to serve in the Irish Republic's First Dáil. This revolutionary body assembled on 21 January 1919.

In republican theory every MP elected in Ireland, including the two Unionist MPs from Dublin University, was a member of the First Dáil. In practice only Sinn Féin members participated.

The First Dáil passed a motion at its last meeting on 10 May 1921, the first three parts of which make explicit the republican view:

1. That the Parliamentary elections which are to take place during the present month be regarded as elections to Dáil Éireann.
2. That all deputies duly returned at these elections be regarded as members of Dáil Éireann and allowed to take their seats on subscribing to the proposed Oath of Allegiance.
3. That the present Dáil dissolve automatically as soon as the new body has been summoned by the President and called to order.

The Second Dáil first met on 16 August 1921, thereby dissolving the First Dáil.

Sinn Féin used the polls for the Northern Ireland House of Commons and the House of Commons of Southern Ireland as an election for the Irish Republic's Second Dáil. No actual voting was necessary in Southern Ireland as all the seats were filled by unopposed returns. Except for this university all other constituencies elected Sinn Féin TDs. The university elected four Independent Unionist members unopposed. As with the First Dáil, those Deputies could have joined the Dáil if they chose.

The 3rd Dáil elected in 1922 was, in United Kingdom law, the constituent assembly for the Irish Free State. From this time the Dáil represented only the twenty-six Irish counties and not the six counties of Northern Ireland. Non-Sinn Féin Deputies, including those from the university, began to participate in the Dáil.

In the Electoral Act 1923, the Irish Free State defined its own Dáil constituencies. The University of Dublin was granted three seats, to be elected by single transferable vote by all graduates and scholars, regardless of sex, over the age of 21. Plural voting was not allowed.

The Constitution (Amendment No. 23) Act 1936, removed the provisions in Constitution of the Irish Free State for University representation in Dáil Éireann, with effect from the next dissolution of the Oireachtas, which took place on 14 June 1937. Voters resident in the State had their Dáil registration switched to the geographical constituency of their registered address.

==== TDs ====
Teachtaí Dála (TDs) for Dublin University 1918–1937
Key to parties: Ind U = Ind. Unionist; Ind. = Independent; U = Irish Unionist
Dáil	Election	Deputy (Party)	Deputy (Party)	Deputy (Party)	Deputy (Party)
1st	1918	Arthur Samuels (U)	Robert Woods (Ind U)	2 seats under 1918 Act	
1st	1919	William Jellett (U)	Robert Woods (Ind U)	2 seats under 1918 Act	
2nd	1921	Ernest Alton (Ind U)	James Craig (Ind U)	William Thrift (Ind U)	Gerald Fitzgibbon (Ind U)
3rd	1922	Ernest Alton (Ind.)	James Craig (Ind.)	William Thrift (Ind.)	Gerald Fitzgibbon (Ind.)
4th	1923	Ernest Alton (Ind.)	James Craig (Ind.)	William Thrift (Ind.)	3 seats from 1923
5th	1927 (Jun)	Ernest Alton (Ind.)	James Craig (Ind.)	William Thrift (Ind.)	3 seats from 1923
6th	1927 (Sep)	Ernest Alton (Ind.)	James Craig (Ind.)	William Thrift (Ind.)	3 seats from 1923
7th	1932	Ernest Alton (Ind.)	James Craig (Ind.)	William Thrift (Ind.)	3 seats from 1923
8th	1933	Ernest Alton (Ind.)	James Craig (Ind.)	William Thrift (Ind.)	3 seats from 1923
8th	1933	Ernest Alton (Ind.)	Robert Rowlette (Ind.)	William Thrift (Ind.)	3 seats from 1923

Note: The columns in this table are used only for presentational purposes, and no significance should be attached to the order of columns. For details of the order in which seats were won at each election, see the detailed results of that election.

=== Seanad Éireann (since 1938) ===
Article 18.4 of the Constitution of Ireland adopted in 1937, provided that the university would have three seats in the new Seanad Éireann. The Seanad Electoral (University Members) Act 1937 gave effect to the constitutional provision, and provided that they would be elected by single transferable vote. The first Seanad election took place in 1938, and thereafter elections to the Seanad take place within 90 days of the dissolution of the Dáil. The Seventh Amendment of the Constitution, adopted in 1979, allows for a redistribution of the six university seats among the University of Dublin, the National University of Ireland, and any other institutions of higher education in the State which do not have representation.

Under the Seanad Electoral (University Members) (Amendment) Act 2024, the 2025 Seanad election to the 27th Seanad will be the last general election for the National University and the Dublin University constituencies. Polls for this election will close on 29 January 2025. At any Seanad general election held after 31 March 2025, they will be substituted by a new six-seat Higher Education constituency, enfranchising graduates from all institutions of higher education recognised under the Higher Education Act 2022. If a vacancy occurs during the 27th Seanad in the Dublin University constituency, the electorate will be Dublin University graduates on the Higher Education constituency register of electors.

The electorate is Irish citizens who have received a degree from the university, or undergraduates who have been awarded a foundation scholarship or non-foundation scholarship at Trinity College. After the Fourth Amendment in 1972, the age of eligibility was lowered from 21 to 18. Voting for the Seanad is distinct from that for the Dáil, so it is not considered plural voting; however, plural voting is possible for those who have received degrees from both the University of Dublin and the National University of Ireland. Trinity College Dublin is the sole constituent college of the University of Dublin, so the electorate is predominantly composed of graduates of Trinity; however, from 1975 to 1998, the University of Dublin also awarded the degrees of graduates at the Dublin Institute of Technology.

Nominations are by electors in their personal capacity; unlike Dáil elections, there is no provision for nomination by parties. Most of the senators for the constituency have campaigned as Independents, though Mary Robinson and Ivana Bacik took the Labour Party whip for periods of their time in the Seanad.

A number of the senators have had a reputation as being quite socially liberal, including Owen Sheehy-Skeffington, Noël Browne, and Catherine McGuinness. Three Senators were later appointed to the Supreme Court: T. C. Kingsmill Moore, Gardner Budd and Catherine McGuinness. Mary Robinson, first elected in 1969, was later elected as President of Ireland in 1990. In 1987, David Norris became the first openly gay member of either house of the Oireachtas. The senators have often included current or recent academics within Trinity College, such as professor of Latin and provost Ernest Alton, professor of Greek William Bedell Stanford, professor of mathematics Trevor West, professor of medicine Mary Henry, Ivana Bacik in law, and David Norris in English.

Senators for Dublin University 1938–present
Key to parties: Ind. = Independent; Lab = Labour
Sen	Election	Senator (Party)	Senator (Party)	Senator (Party)
2nd	1938	Ernest Alton (Ind.)	Joseph Johnston (Ind.)	Robert Rowlette (Ind.)
3rd	1938	Ernest Alton (Ind.)	Joseph Johnston (Ind.)	Robert Rowlette (Ind.)
4th	1943	T. C. Kingsmill Moore (Ind.)	William Fearon (Ind.)	Robert Rowlette (Ind.)
5th	1944	T. C. Kingsmill Moore (Ind.)	William Fearon (Ind.)	Joseph Johnston (Ind.)
5th	1947	Joseph Warwick Bigger (Ind.)	William Fearon (Ind.)	Joseph Johnston (Ind.)
6th	1948	Joseph Warwick Bigger (Ind.)	William Fearon (Ind.)	William Stanford (Ind.)
7th	1951	Gardner Budd (Ind.)	William Fearon (Ind.)	William Stanford (Ind.)
7th	1952	William Jessop (Ind.)	William Fearon (Ind.)	William Stanford (Ind.)
8th	1954	Owen Sheehy-Skeffington (Ind.)	William Fearon (Ind.)	William Stanford (Ind.)
9th	1957	Owen Sheehy-Skeffington (Ind.)	William Fearon (Ind.)	William Stanford (Ind.)
9th	1960	Owen Sheehy-Skeffington (Ind.)	William Jessop (Ind.)	William Stanford (Ind.)
10th	1961	John N. Ross (Ind.)	William Jessop (Ind.)	William Stanford (Ind.)
11th	1965	Owen Sheehy-Skeffington (Ind.)	William Jessop (Ind.)	William Stanford (Ind.)
12th	1969	Owen Sheehy-Skeffington (Ind.)	William Jessop (Ind.)	Mary Robinson (Ind.)
12th	1970	Trevor West (Ind.)	William Jessop (Ind.)	Mary Robinson (Ind.)
13th	1973	Trevor West (Ind.)	Noël Browne (Ind.)	Mary Robinson (Ind.)
14th	1977	Trevor West (Ind.)	Conor Cruise O'Brien (Ind.)	Mary Robinson (Lab)
14th	1979	Trevor West (Ind.)	Catherine McGuinness (Ind.)	Mary Robinson (Lab)
15th	1981	Shane Ross (Ind.)	Catherine McGuinness (Ind.)	Mary Robinson (Lab)
16th	1982	Shane Ross (Ind.)	Trevor West (Ind.)	Mary Robinson (Lab)
17th	1983	Shane Ross (Ind.)	Catherine McGuinness (Ind.)	Mary Robinson (Lab)
18th	1987	Shane Ross (Ind.)	David Norris (Ind.)	Mary Robinson (Ind.)
19th	1989	Shane Ross (Ind.)	David Norris (Ind.)	Carmencita Hederman (Ind.)
20th	1993	Shane Ross (Ind.)	David Norris (Ind.)	Mary Henry (Ind.)
21st	1997	Shane Ross (Ind.)	David Norris (Ind.)	Mary Henry (Ind.)
22nd	2002	Shane Ross (Ind.)	David Norris (Ind.)	Mary Henry (Ind.)
23rd	2007	Shane Ross (Ind.)	David Norris (Ind.)	Ivana Bacik (Ind.)
24th	2011	Sean Barrett (Ind.)	David Norris (Ind.)	Ivana Bacik (Lab)
25th	2016	Lynn Ruane (Ind.)	David Norris (Ind.)	Ivana Bacik (Lab)
26th	2020	Lynn Ruane (Ind.)	David Norris (Ind.)	Ivana Bacik (Lab)
26th	2022	Lynn Ruane (Ind.)	David Norris (Ind.)	Tom Clonan (Ind.)
27th	2025	Lynn Ruane (Ind.)	Aubrey McCarthy (Ind.)	Tom Clonan (Ind.)

Note: The columns in this table are used only for presentational purposes, and no significance should be attached to the order of columns.

== Elections ==
From 1832 (when registers of electors were first prepared) a turnout figure is given, for the percentage of the registered electors who voted. If the number of registered electors eligible to take part in a contested election is unknown, then the last known electorate figure is used to calculate an estimated turnout. If the numbers of registered electors and electors taking part in the poll are known, an exact turnout figure is calculated. In two member bloc vote elections (in which an elector could cast one or two votes as he chose), where the exact number of electors participating is unknown, an estimated turnout figure is given. This is calculated by dividing the total number of votes cast by two. To the extent that electors used only one of their votes the estimated turnout figure is an underestimate.

=== Elections in the 2020s ===
==== 2025 election ====
2025 Seanad election: Dublin University
Party	Candidate	FPv%	Count														
Party	Candidate	FPv%	1	2	3	4	5	6	7	8	9	10	11	12	13	14	15
Independent	Lynn Ruane	21.1	3,761	3,769	3,781	3,792	3,803	3,900	3,974	4,042	4,102	4,399	4,806				
Independent	Tom Clonan	19.5	3,473	3,482	3,492	3,503	3,534	3,578	3,626	3,743	3,931	4,090	4,269	4,346	4,938		
Independent	Aubrey McCarthy	10.2	1,814	1,818	1,823	1,839	1,874	1,896	1,926	1,996	2,115	2,205	2,314	2,343	2,630	2,747	3,770
Independent	Hugo MacNeill	9.5	1,684	1,687	1,696	1,721	1,757	1,764	1,792	1,870	1,957	2,057	2,116	2,141	2,359	2,476	
Green	Hazel Chu (Note: Indication of party membership. No party labels appeared on the ballot.)	8.1	1,450	1,453	1,462	1,471	1,480	1,515	1,573	1,627	1,649	1,803	2,062	2,201	2,962	3,163	3,706
Green	Ossian Smyth	7.8	1,380	1,382	1,385	1,393	1,401	1,419	1,439	1,509	1,524	1,641	1,945	2,029			
Labour	Sadhbh O'Neill	6.1	1,085	1,086	1,088	1,095	1,106	1,161	1,196	1,249	1,305	1,384					
Independent	Katherine Zappone	5.3	950	951	955	956	959	970	1,001	1,018	1,039						
Independent	Laoise De Brún	3.3	593	595	598	604	616	621	640	668							
Independent	Kevin Byrne	2.8	495	500	516	528	557	564	582								
Independent	Ade Oluborode	1.9	339	343	349	363	365	372									
Social Democrats	Paul Mulville	1.7	305	306	309	314	319										
Independent	Marcus Matthews	1.0	186	188	189	198											
Independent	Jack Mulcahy	0.8	140	144	145												
Independent	Derek Byrne	0.5	87	90													
Independent	Abbas Ali O'Shea	0.3	55														
Electorate: 70,000 Valid: 17,797 Spoilt: 24 Quota: 4,450 Turnout: 17,821 (25.5%)

==== 2022 by-election ====
2022 Seanad by-election: Dublin University
Party	Candidate	FPv%	Count															
Party	Candidate	FPv%	1	2	3	4	5	6	7	8	9	10	11	12	13	14	15	16
Independent	Hugo MacNeill	15.4	2,068	2,071	2,075	2,085	2,092	2,102	2,121	2,153	2,250	2,290	2,312	2,391	2,624	2,863		
Independent	Tom Clonan	14.5	1,947	1,952	1,976	1,990	2,014	2,040	2,077	2,137	2,243	2,332	2,436	2,637	2,973	3,359	4,200	5,358
Independent	Maureen Gaffney	14.0	1,882	1,884	1,892	1,913	1,936	1,972	1,993	2,066	2,121	2,190	2,274	2,438	2,641	3,083	3,908	5,198
Green Party	Hazel Chu (Note: Indication of party membership. No party labels appeared on the ballot.)	13.2	1,766	1,770	1,785	1,802	1,823	1,842	1,858	1,918	1,955	2,090	2,272	2,583	2,743	3,300	3,683	
Labour Party	Ursula Quill	8.6	1,156	1,159	1,178	1,205	1,226	1,246	1,290	1,325	1,368	1,430	1,525	1,773	1,890			
Independent	Aubrey McCarthy	7.1	947	950	954	962	977	997	1,012	1,033	1,115	1,139	1,187	1,281				
Independent	Sadhbh O'Neill	6.5	870	873	879	896	909	931	940	991	1,030	1,105	1,186					
Social Democrats	Catherine Stocker	3.9	521	521	530	541	548	563	576	600	608	657						
Independent	Ade Oluborode	3.5	471	479	488	500	508	528	548	576	586							
Independent	Ray Bassett	3.4	458	458	458	463	475	480	497	544								
Independent	Patricia McKenna	3.1	421	421	427	434	440	454	463									
Independent	Paula Roseingrave	1.5	200	200	202	209	220											
Labour Party	Eoin Barry	1.4	189	192	199	199												
Independent	Ryan Alberto Ó Giobúin	1.4	182	183	195	202	222	230										
Independent	Gisèle Scanlon	1.3	170	170	174													
Independent	Michael McDermott	1.0	132	134														
Independent	Abbas Ali O'Shea	0.3	38															
Electorate: 67,788 Valid: 13,418 Spoilt: 16 Quota: 6,710 Turnout: 13,434 (19.8%)

==== 2020 election ====
2020 Seanad election: Dublin University
Party	Candidate	FPv%	Count							
Party	Candidate	FPv%	1	2	3	4	5	6	7	8
Independent	David Norris	24.2	3,646	3,671	3,728	3,768				
Labour	Ivana Bacik	23.2	3,489	3,521	3,542	3,571	3,574	3,963		
Independent	Lynn Ruane	18.4	2,780	2,805	2,825	2,870	2,871	3,229	3,348	4,072
Independent	Hugo MacNeill	13.5	2,038	2,050	2,081	2,133	2,133	2,299	2,342	2,961
Independent	Tom Clonan	9.3	1,394	1,417	1,440	1,492	1,493	1,682	1,722	
Green	William Priestley	7.2	1,090	1,104	1,119	1,175	1,177			
Independent	Keith Scanlon	1.8	276	285	297					
Independent	Joseph O'Gorman	1.2	180	183						
Independent	Abbas Ali O'Shea	0.5	81							
Independent	Derek Byrne	0.4	67							
Electorate: Approx. 65,000 Valid: 15,041 Spoilt: 12 Quota: 3,761 Turnout: Approx. 23.1%

=== Elections in the 2010s ===
==== 2016 election ====
2016 Seanad election: Dublin University
Party	Candidate	FPv%	Count														
Party	Candidate	FPv%	1	2	3	4	5	6	7	8	9	10	11	12	13	14	15
Independent	David Norris	25.3	4,070														
Labour	Ivana Bacik	17.8	2,853	2,871	2,887	2,904	2,936	2,956	3,043	3,113	3,197	3,306	3,482	3,758	4,144		
Independent	Lynn Ruane	8.6	1,378	1,381	1,399	1,418	1,434	1,471	1,524	1,563	1,646	1,793	1,903	2,128	2,480	2,511	3,343
Independent	Averil Power	8.4	1,356	1,363	1,380	1,388	1,400	1,414	1,465	1,527	1,582	1,644	1,741	1,853	2,135	2,176	
Independent	Sean Barrett	8.2	1,317	1,326	1,333	1,353	1,362	1,386	1,443	1,570	1,683	1,766	1,972	2,097	2,502	2,557	3,228
Independent	Tom Clonan	7.0	1,131	1,133	1,147	1,153	1,157	1,172	1,233	1,280	1,364	1,458	1,590	1,742			
Independent	Oisín Coghlan	4.3	683	685	690	696	720	743	778	796	847	945	1,017				
Independent	Anthony Staines	4.1	665	668	674	684	689	707	742	788	852	904					
Green	William Priestley	3.4	548	550	561	574	598	634	661	689	737						
Independent	Ethna Tinney	3.2	516	518	528	534	538	553	594	631							
Independent	Sean Melly	2.8	450	451	452	465	471	497	513								
Independent	Sabina Brennan	2.8	445	447	457	466	470	484									
Independent	Kevin Cunningham	1.4	232	233	246	255	259										
Independent	Eoin Meehan	0.9	143	143	145												
Independent	Edward Davitt	0.9	142	142	147	151											
Independent	Maeve Cox	0.8	135	136													
Electorate: 57,732 Valid: 16,064 Spoilt: 43 Quota: 4,017 Turnout: 16,107 (27.9%)

==== 2011 election ====
In 2011 Karin Dubsky, who was listed on the printed ballot papers, discovered after their distribution that she was not an Irish citizen and thus ineligible, and advised electors not to vote for her. The returning officer ruled that ballots giving her a first preference would be excluded, but ballots giving her a lower preference would be transferred to the next lower preference when relevant.

2011 Seanad election: Dublin University
Party	Candidate	FPv%	Count																	
Party	Candidate	FPv%	1	2	3	4	5	6	7	8	9	10	11	12	13	14	15	16	17	18
Independent	David Norris	36.1	5,623																	
Labour	Ivana Bacik	19.2	2,982	3,685	3,685	3,693	3,701	3,728	3,781	3,833	3,889	3,940								
Independent	Tony Williams	8.6	1,336	1,493	1,494	1,501	1,504	1,522	1,527	1,539	1,558	1,601	1,605	1,642	1,677	1,730	1,805	1,869	2,098	2,480
Independent	Sean Barrett	6.8	1,051	1,248	1,256	1,263	1,273	1,293	1,314	1,340	1,356	1,383	1,391	1,444	1,493	1,622	1,823	1,952	2,450	3,065
Independent	Maurice Gueret	5.3	822	936	938	946	950	958	969	984	1,005	1,024	1,030	1,077	1,149	1,230	1,333	1,534	1,803	
Independent	Rosaleen McDonagh	2.9	446	511	511	513	522	522	528	544	559	576	584	622	762	837	909			
Independent	Fiona O'Malley	2.8	441	590	550	550	554	562	570	596	619	632	637	660	685	752				
Independent	Robin Hannan	2.6	406	443	443	443	447	450	455	468	480	495	498	529						
Independent	Iggy McGovern	2.6	397	441	443	445	451	457	491	496	505	526	531	566	626					
Independent	William Priestley	1.7	258	302	304	308	310	319	334	348	371	380	382							
Independent	Jeff Dudgeon	1.3	205	236	237	237	241	242	245	252	258									
Independent	David Martin	1.3	194	221	221	221	223	226	233	241										
Independent	Dermot Frost	1.1	178	199	199	203	207	208												
Independent	Maeve Cox	1.1	174	213	214	215	217	225	233											
Independent	Graham Quinn	0.8	131	142	143	147	147													
Independent	Bart Connolly	0.4	72	80	80	80														
Independent	Dermot Sheehan	0.3	49	54	55															
Independent	Francis Donnelly (Note: Francis Donnelly unofficially withdrew from the race to concentrate on the Labour Panel in which he was also running. His name remained on the ballot paper.)	0.1	20	27																
Electorate: 53,583 Valid: 15,557 Spoilt: 257 Quota: 3,890 Turnout: 29.5%

=== Elections in the 2000s ===
==== 2007 election ====
2007 Seanad election: Dublin University
Party	Candidate	FPv%	Count							
Party	Candidate	FPv%	1	2	3	4	5	6	7	8
Independent	Shane Ross	31.8	5,379							
Independent	David Norris	31.0	5,240							
Independent	Ivana Bacik	16.5	2,794	3,255	3,799	3,882	3,944	4,010	4,107	4,285
Independent	Maurice Gueret	6.8	1,155	1,407	1,534	1,557	1,604	1,648	1,728	1,828
Independent	Rosaleen McDonagh	4.0	684	766	858	893	962	1,011	1,063	1,168
Independent	Seán O'Connor	3.0	514	610	671	692	716	756	818	889
Independent	David Hutchinson Edgar	2.0	330	409	459	496	507	538	573	
Independent	David Martin	1.3	223	261	285	295	313			
Independent	Shay Conway	1.3	214	271	307	325	346	376		
Independent	Ike Efobi	1.2	201	237	280	287				
Independent	Stephen Douglas	1.1	183	231	264					
Valid: 16,917 Quota: 4,230

==== 2002 election ====
2002 Seanad election: Dublin University
Party	Candidate	FPv%	Count									
Party	Candidate	FPv%	1	2	3	4	5	6	7	8	9	10
Independent	David Norris	24.5	3,493	3,508	3,532	3,558	3,747					
Independent	Shane Ross	24.3	3,465	3,478	3,501	3,521	3,631					
Independent	Mary Henry	14.9	2,123	2,131	2,139	2,163	2,234	2,272	2,282	2,491	2,886	3,529
Independent	Ivana Bacik	11.2	1,591	1,600	1,618	1,636	1,735	1,787	1,796	2,125	2,295	2,660
Independent	Sean Barrett	7.0	994	1,006	1,015	1,030	1,096	1,113	1,138	1,242	1,465	
Independent	Maurice Gueret	5.5	780	787	797	814	879	894	907	1,021		
Independent	Rosaleen McDonagh	5.2	733	743	756	771	845	875	889			
Independent	P.J. O'Meara	1.9	265	269	278	285	285					
Independent	David Martin	1.5	212	216	230	240						
Independent	Prabu Kulkarni	1.3	185	191	197	206						
Independent	Gerard McHugh	1.1	156	160	170							
Independent	Anthony O'Donnell	1.0	142	146								
Independent	Declan Boland	0.6	98									
Electorate: 38,488 Valid: 14,237 Spoilt: 20 Quota: 3,560 Turnout: 37.0%

=== Elections in the 1990s ===
==== 1997 election ====
1997 Seanad election: Dublin University
Party	Candidate	FPv%	%	Seat	Count
Independent	David Norris	4,866	36.4	1	1
Independent	Shane Ross	2,475	18.5	3	6
Independent	Mary Henry	2,410	18.0	2	5
Independent	Sean Barrett	1,491	11.2		
Independent	Ivana Bacik	885	6.6		
Independent	Henry Mountcharles	461	3.5		
Independent	David Martin	345	2.6		
Independent	Prabhu Kulkarni	218	1.6		
Independent	Brian Caul	149	1.1		
Independent	Nigel Hutson	74	0.6		

==== 1993 election ====
1993 Seanad election: Dublin University
Party	Candidate	FPv%	%	Seat	Count
Independent	David Norris	3,569	31.1	1	1
Independent	Shane Ross	2,672	23.3	2	4
Independent	Mary Henry	1,980	17.3	3	10
Independent	James Rickard	1,006	8.8		
Independent	Claire Wheeler	505	4.4		
Independent	Alan Stanford	360	3.1		
Independent	Virginia Hogan	291	2.5		
Independent	David Martin	257	2.2		
Independent	John Dillon	251	2.2		
Independent	Erick Dillon	225	2.0		
Independent	Prabhu Kulkarni	129	1.1		
Independent	Frederick O'Connell	118	1.0		
Independent	Florence O'Donoghue	81	0.7		
Independent	Peter Cooke	28	0.2		

=== Elections in the 1980s ===
==== 1989 election ====
1989 Seanad election: Dublin University
Party	Candidate	FPv%	Count					
Party	Candidate	FPv%	1	2	3	4	5	6
Independent	Shane Ross	26.8	2,443					
Independent	David Norris	26.6	2,420					
Independent	Carmencita Hederman	17.9	1,627	1,689	1,754	1,791	1,888	2,456
Independent	Mary Henry	12.4	1,130	1,199	1,231	1,272	1,336	1,781
Independent	J. Rickard	6.2	567	573	591	655	745	
Independent	B. Harvey	4.4	407	425	436	462	522	
Independent	P. F. O'Brien	3.5	319	325	333	357		
Independent	P. Smyth	2.1	188	194	204			
Electorate: 18,245 Valid: 9,101 Spoilt: 7 Quota: 2,276 Turnout: 49.88%

==== 1987 election ====
1987 Seanad election: Dublin University
Party	Candidate	FPv%	Count	
Party	Candidate	FPv%	1	2
Independent	Shane Ross	25.5	2,180	
Independent	Mary Robinson	24.8	2,123	2,221
Independent	David Norris	24.6	2,101	2,260
Independent	Catherine McGuinness	13.7	1,170	1,232
Independent	B. O'Rafferty	6.6	562	620
Independent	Ferdinand von Prondzynski	2.6	224	
Independent	W. J. McCormack	2.2	188	
Electorate: 14,737 Valid: 8,548 Spoilt: 16 Quota: 2,138 Turnout: 58.00%

==== 1983 election ====
1983 Seanad election: Dublin University
Party	Candidate	FPv%	Count					
Party	Candidate	FPv%	1	2	3	4	5	6
Independent	Shane Ross	23.0	1,560	1,574	1,654	1,771		
Independent	Mary Robinson	22.2	1,506	1,547	1,681	2,194		
Independent	Trevor West	17.1	1,144	1,178	1,283	1,399	1,527	1,565
Independent	Catherine McGuinness	15.1	1,026	1,052	1,151	1,314	1,593	1,631
Independent	David Norris	12.5	850	876	957			
Independent	David Cabot	7.2	488	534				
Independent	R.A. Kennedy	2.3	159					
Independent	William Fitzsimon	0.7	45					
Electorate: 10,293 Valid: 6,778 Spoilt: 63 Quota: 1,695 Turnout: 66.46%

==== 1982 election ====
1982 Seanad election: Dublin University
Party	Candidate	FPv%	Count						
Party	Candidate	FPv%	1	2	3	4	5	6	7
Independent	Shane Ross	23.9	1,412	1,423	1,430	1,462	1,548		
Independent	Mary Robinson	20.6	1,212	1,220	1,282	1,461	1,634		
Independent	Trevor West	20.1	1,185	1,193	1,209	1,263	1,390	1,443	1,490
Independent	Catherine McGuinness	17.3	1,023	1,032	1,062	1,141	1,272	1,378	1,404
Independent	David Cabot	7.4	437	446	472	535			
Independent	David Norris	6.6	392	396	429				
Independent	B. Cullen	2.8	167	180					
Independent	William Fitzsimon	1.2	69						
Electorate: 9,164 Valid: 5,897 Spoilt: 58 Quota: 1,475 Turnout: 64.34%

==== 1981 election ====
1981 Seanad election: Dublin University
Party	Candidate	FPv%	Count					
Party	Candidate	FPv%	1	2	3	4	5	6
Independent	Shane Ross	24.6	1,415	1,422	1,431	1,475		
Independent	Mary Robinson	19.1	1,097	1,103	1,152	1,207	1,387	1,583
Independent	Catherine McGuinness	19.1	1,096	1,103	1,122	1,158	1,229	1,428
Independent	Trevor West	15.0	863	869	891	926	985	1,183
Independent	David Cabot	8.6	492	502	528	554	663	
Independent	David Norris	6.2	360	366	389	410		
Independent	Thomas Murtagh	3.5	203	205	223			
Independent	B. Cullen	2.7	159	173				
Independent	William Fitzsimon	0.8	40					
Independent	O. Quinn	0.4	20					
Electorate: 9,262 Valid: 5,745 Spoilt: 90 Quota: 1,437 Turnout: 62.03%

=== Elections in the 1970s ===
==== 1979 by-election ====
Following the resignation of Conor Cruise O'Brien on 13 June 1979.

1979 Seanad by-election: Dublin University
Party	Candidate	FPv%	Count		
Party	Candidate	FPv%	1	2	3
Independent	Catherine McGuinness	35.1	1,841	2,175	2,790
Independent	Shane Ross	31.0	1,625	1,777	2,270
Independent	Thomas Murtagh	19.7	1,033	1,225	
Independent	David Norris	12.6	659		
Independent	O. Quinn	1.7	88		
Electorate: 8,686 Valid: 5,246 Spoilt: 103 Quota: 2,624 Turnout: 61.58%

==== 1973 election ====
1973 Seanad election: Dublin University
Party	Candidate	FPv%	Count					
Party	Candidate	FPv%	1	2	3	4	5	6
Independent	Mary Robinson	30.3	1,472					
Independent	Noël Browne	19.5	944	1,019	1,064	1,137	1,415	
Independent	William J. E. Jessop	15.4	747	781	804	853	1,033	1,117
Independent	Trevor West	14.3	695	758	780	837	1,098	1,216
Independent	D.J. McConnell	7.5	365	396	414	436		
Independent	David Cabot	5.4	263	314	360			
Independent	L. Fleming	4.3	211	226	251			
Independent	D. Waldron-Lynch	1.3	64	68				
Independent	J. Revington	1.2	57	60				
Independent	N. O'Byrne Healy	0.7	33	37				
Electorate: 7,047 Valid: 4,851 Spoilt: 80 Quota: 1,213 Turnout: 69.97%

=== Elections in the 1960s ===
==== 1960 by-election ====
Following the death of William Fearon on 27 December 1959.

1960 Seanad by-election: Dublin University
Party	Candidate	FPv%	Count	
Party	Candidate	FPv%	1	2
Independent	William J. E. Jessop	49.9	1,736	1,828
Independent	John N. Ross	36.8	1,281	1,343
Independent	C. Lloyd	7.8	271	298
Independent	Eoin O'Mahony	5.5	192	
Valid: 3,480 Quota: 1,741

=== Elections in the 1940s ===
==== 1944 election ====
1944 Seanad election: Dublin University
Party	Candidate	FPv%	%	Seat	Count
Independent	T. C. Kingsmill Moore	755	32.9	1	1
Independent	William Fearon	621	27.0	2	1
Independent	Joseph Johnston	437	19.0	3	4
Independent	Robert Rowlette	419	18.2		
Independent	Eoin O'Mahony	65	2.8		
Electorate: 3,886 Valid: 2,297 Quota: 575 Turnout: 59.1%

=== Elections in the 1930s ===
==== 1933 by-election ====
Held on 13 October 1933, following the death of independent TD Sir James Craig on 12 July 1933.

1933 by-election: Dublin University (uncontested)
Party	Candidate
Independent	Robert Rowlette
Electorate: 3,260

==== 1933 election ====
1933 general election: Dublin University (uncontested)
Party	Candidate
Independent	Ernest Alton
Independent	James Craig
Independent	William Thrift
Electorate: 3,260

==== 1932 election ====
1932 general election: Dublin University (uncontested)
Party	Candidate
Independent	Ernest Alton
Independent	James Craig
Independent	William Thrift
Electorate: 3,182

=== Elections in the 1920s ===
==== September 1927 election ====
September 1927 general election: Dublin University (uncontested)
Party	Candidate
Independent	Ernest Alton
Independent	James Craig
Independent	William Thrift
Electorate: 2,084

==== June 1927 election ====
June 1927 general election: Dublin University
Party	Candidate	FPv%	Count		
Party	Candidate	FPv%	1	2	3
Independent	William Thrift	38.6	614		
Independent	James Craig	22.4	356	415	
Independent	Bolton C. Waller	20.9	332	388	393
Independent	Ernest Alton	18.1	287	388	400
Electorate: 2,084 Valid: 1,589 Quota: 398 Turnout: 76.3%

==== 1923 election ====
1923 general election: Dublin University (uncontested)
Party	Candidate
Independent	Ernest Alton
Independent	James Craig
Independent	William Thrift
Electorate: 1,400

==== 1922 election ====
1922 general election: Dublin University (uncontested)
Party	Candidate
Independent	Ernest Alton
Independent	James Craig
Independent	Gerald Fitzgibbon
Independent	William Thrift
Electorate: 1,150

==== 1921 election ====
1921 general election: Dublin University (uncontested)
Party	Candidate
Ind. Unionist	Ernest Alton
Ind. Unionist	James Craig
Ind. Unionist	Gerald Fitzgibbon
Ind. Unionist	William Thrift

=== Elections in the 1910s ===
1919 by-election: Dublin University (1 seat)
Party	Candidate	Votes	%	±%
Irish Unionist	William Jellett	Unopposed		
Irish Unionist hold				

- Caused by Samuels' appointment to the High Court of Justice in Ireland.

This was the last UK parliamentary by-election held in the 26 counties which became the Irish Free State.

1918 general election: Dublin University (2 seats)
Party	Candidate	FPv%	Count		
Party	Candidate	FPv%	1	2	3
Irish Unionist	Arthur Samuels	43.1	1,273		
Ind. Unionist	Robert Woods	26.8	793	888	1,094
Irish Unionist	William Jellett	21.4	631	810	826
Ind. Nationalist	Stephen Gwynn	8.7	257	271	eliminated
Electorate: 4,541 Valid: 2,954 Quota: 985 Turnout: 59.4%

Note: The Times edition of 23 December 1918 reported that the Provost of the University, as returning officer, did not announce the figures.

October 1917 by-election: Dublin University (1 seat)
Party	Candidate	Votes	%	±%
Irish Unionist	Arthur Samuels	Unopposed		
Irish Unionist hold				

- Caused by Samuels' appointment as Solicitor-General for Ireland.

February 1917 by-election: Dublin University (1 seat)
Party	Candidate	Votes	%	±%
Irish Unionist	Arthur Samuels	1,841	73.06	N/A
Irish Unionist	Robert Woods	679	26.94	N/A
Majority		1,162	46.12	N/A
Turnout		2,520	60.9	N/A
Registered electors		4,138		
Irish Unionist hold		Swing	N/A	

- Caused by Campbell's appointment as Lord Chief Justice of Ireland.

1916 by-election: Dublin University (1 seat)
Party	Candidate	Votes	%	±%
Irish Unionist	James Campbell	Unopposed		
Irish Unionist hold				

- Caused by Campbell's appointment as Attorney-General for Ireland.

December 1910 general election: Dublin University (2 seats)
Party	Candidate	Votes	%	±%
Irish Unionist	Edward Carson	Unopposed		
Irish Unionist	James Campbell	Unopposed		
Irish Unionist hold				
Irish Unionist hold				

January 1910 general election: Dublin University (2 seats)
Party	Candidate	Votes	%	±%
Irish Unionist	Edward Carson	Unopposed		
Irish Unionist	James Campbell	Unopposed		
Irish Unionist hold				
Irish Unionist hold				

=== Elections in the 1900s ===
1906 general election: Dublin University (2 seats)
Party	Candidate	Votes	%	±%
Irish Unionist	Edward Carson	Unopposed		
Irish Unionist	James Campbell	Unopposed		
Irish Unionist hold				
Irish Unionist hold				

1903 by-election: Dublin University (1 seat)
Party	Candidate	Votes	%	±%
Irish Unionist	James Campbell	1,492	51.2	N/A
Irish Unionist	Arthur Samuels	1,421	48.8	N/A
Majority		71	2.4	N/A
Turnout		2,913	64.0	N/A
Registered electors		4,553		
Irish Unionist gain from Liberal Unionist		Swing	N/A	

- Caused by Lecky's resignation.

1900 general election: Dublin University (2 seats)
Party	Candidate	Votes	%	±%
Irish Unionist	Edward Carson	Unopposed		
Liberal Unionist	W. E. H. Lecky	Unopposed		
Irish Unionist hold				
Liberal Unionist hold				

1900 by-election: Dublin University (1 seat)
Party	Candidate	Votes	%	±%
Irish Unionist	Edward Carson	Unopposed		
Irish Unionist hold				

- Caused by Carson's appointment as Solicitor General for England and Wales.

=== Elections in the 1890s ===
1895 by-election: Dublin University (1 seat)
Party	Candidate	Votes	%	±%
Liberal Unionist	W. E. H. Lecky	1,757	63.5	New
Irish Unionist	George Wright	1,011	36.5	N/A
Majority		746	27.0	N/A
Turnout		2,768	61.4	N/A
Registered electors		4,506		
Liberal Unionist gain from Irish Unionist		Swing	N/A	

- Caused by Plunket's succession to the peerage, becoming Baron Rathmore.

1895 general election: Dublin University (2 seats)
Party	Candidate	Votes	%	±%
Irish Unionist	David Plunket	Unopposed		
Irish Unionist	Edward Carson	Unopposed		
Registered electors		4,506		
Irish Unionist hold				
Irish Unionist hold				

1892 general election: Dublin University (2 seats)
Party	Candidate	Votes	%	±%
Irish Unionist	David Plunket	2,188	46.6	−2.1
Irish Unionist	Edward Carson	1,609	34.3	N/A
Irish Unionist	James Corry Jones Lowry	897	19.1	N/A
Majority		712	15.2	−31.7
Turnout		2,347 (est)	53.9 (est)	+7.8
Registered electors		4,352		
Irish Unionist hold		Swing	N/A	
Irish Unionist hold		Swing	N/A	

=== Elections in the 1880s ===
1888 by-election: Dublin University (1 seat)
Party	Candidate	Votes	%	±%
Irish Unionist	Dodgson Hamilton Madden	Unopposed		
Registered electors		4,094		
Irish Unionist hold				

- Caused by Madden's appointment as Solicitor-General for Ireland.

1887 by-election: Dublin University (1 seat)
Party	Candidate	Votes	%	±%
Irish Unionist	Dodgson Hamilton Madden	1,376	65.9	N/A
Irish Unionist	Richard Clare Parsons	712	34.1	N/A
Majority		664	31.8	N/A
Turnout		2,088	51.0	N/A
Registered electors		4,092		
Irish Unionist hold		Swing	N/A	

- Caused by Holmes' appointment as a judge.

1886 by-election: Dublin University (2 seats)
Party	Candidate	Votes	%	±%
Irish Unionist	David Plunket	Unopposed		
Irish Unionist	Hugh Holmes	Unopposed		
Registered electors		4,155		
Irish Unionist hold				
Irish Unionist hold				

- Caused by Plunket's appointment as First Commissioner of Works, and Holmes' appointment as Attorney-General for Ireland.

1886 general election: Dublin University (2 seats)
Party	Candidate	Votes	%	±%
Irish Unionist	David Plunket	1,865	48.7	N/A
Irish Unionist	Hugh Holmes	1,855	48.4	N/A
Irish Parliamentary	Hugh Herbert Johnston	56	1.5	New
Irish Parliamentary	Edward Patrick Sarsfield Counsell	55	1.4	New
Majority		1,799	46.9	N/A
Turnout		1,916 (est)	46.1 (est)	N/A
Registered electors		4,155		
Irish Unionist hold		Swing	N/A	
Irish Unionist hold		Swing	N/A	

1885 general election: Dublin University (2 seats)
Party	Candidate	Votes	%	±%
Irish Conservative	David Plunket	Unopposed		
Irish Conservative	Hugh Holmes	Unopposed		
Registered electors		4,155		
Irish Conservative hold				
Irish Conservative hold				

1885 by-election: Dublin University (2 seats)
Party	Candidate	Votes	%	±%
Irish Conservative	David Plunket	Unopposed		
Irish Conservative	Hugh Holmes	Unopposed		
Irish Conservative hold				
Irish Conservative hold				

- Caused by Plunket's appointment as First Commissioner of Works, and Gibson's appointment as Lord Chancellor of Ireland, becoming Baron Ashbourne.

1880 general election: Dublin University (2 seats)
Party	Candidate	Votes	%	±%
Irish Conservative	David Plunket	Unopposed		
Irish Conservative	Edward Gibson	Unopposed		
Registered electors		3,539		
Irish Conservative hold				
Irish Conservative hold				

=== Elections in the 1870s ===
1877 by-election: Dublin University (1 seat)
Party	Candidate	Votes	%	±%
Irish Conservative	Edward Gibson	Unopposed		
Registered electors		3,393		
Irish Conservative hold				

- Caused by Gibson's appointment as Solicitor-General for Ireland.

February 1875 by-election: Dublin University (1 seat)
Party	Candidate	Votes	%	±%
Irish Conservative	David Plunket	Unopposed		
Registered electors		2,438		
Irish Conservative hold				

- Caused by Plunket's appointment as Solicitor-General for Ireland.

January 1875 by-election: Dublin University (1 seat)
Party	Candidate	Votes	%	±%
Irish Conservative	Edward Gibson	1,210	48.3	N/A
Irish Conservative	Alexander Edward Miller	759	30.3	N/A
Irish Conservative	Anthony Traill	538	21.5	N/A
Majority		451	18.0	N/A
Turnout		2,507	102.8 (Note: Walker recorded the vote tally as above, but the electorate he also included was a lower number – at 2,438 – and so this result may be inaccurate.)	N/A
Registered electors		2,438		
Irish Conservative hold				

- Caused by Ball's appointment as Lord Chancellor of Ireland.

1874 by-election: Dublin University (1 seat)
Party	Candidate	Votes	%	±%
Irish Conservative	John Thomas Ball	Unopposed		
Irish Conservative hold				

- Caused by Ball's appointment as Solicitor-General for Ireland.

1874 general election: Dublin University (2 seats)
Party	Candidate	Votes	%	±%
Irish Conservative	David Plunket	Unopposed		
Irish Conservative	John Thomas Ball	Unopposed		
Registered electors		1,700		
Irish Conservative hold				
Irish Conservative hold				

1870 by-election: Dublin University (1 seat)
Party	Candidate	Votes	%	±%
Irish Conservative	David Plunket	Unopposed		
Irish Conservative hold				

- Caused by Lefroy's resignation.

=== Elections in the 1860s ===
1868 general election: Dublin University (2 seats)
Party	Candidate	Votes	%	±%
Irish Conservative	Anthony Lefroy	1,156	36.2	−1.2
Irish Conservative	John Thomas Ball	1,077	33.7	+14.3
Irish Conservative	Edward Grogan	743	23.3	−20.0
Liberal	Thomas Ebenezer Webb	216	6.8	New
Majority		334	10.4	−7.6
Turnout		1,704 (est)	79.2 (est)	−3.1
Registered electors		2,151		
Irish Conservative hold		Swing	N/A	
Irish Conservative hold		Swing	N/A	

August 1867 by-election: Dublin University (1 seat)
Party	Candidate	Votes	%	±%
Irish Conservative	Robert Warren	Unopposed		
Registered electors				
Irish Conservative hold				

- Caused by Chatterton's appointment as Vice-Chancellor of Ireland.

March 1867 by-election: Dublin University (1 seat)
Party	Candidate	Votes	%	±%
Irish Conservative	Hedges Eyre Chatterton	Unopposed		
Registered electors				
Irish Conservative hold				

- Caused by Chatterton's appointment as Attorney-General for Ireland.

February 1867 by-election: Dublin University (1 seat)
Party	Candidate	Votes	%	±%
Irish Conservative	Hedges Eyre Chatterton	Unopposed		
Irish Conservative hold				

- Caused by Walsh's appointment as Master of the Rolls in Ireland

1866 by-election: Dublin University (1 seat)
Party	Candidate	Votes	%	±%
Irish Conservative	John Edward Walsh	Unopposed		
Registered electors		1,700		
Irish Conservative hold				

- Caused by Whiteside's appointment as Lord Chief Justice of Ireland

1865 general election: Dublin University (2 seats)
Party	Candidate	Votes	%	±%
Irish Conservative	James Whiteside	1,210	43.3	N/A
Irish Conservative	Anthony Lefroy	1,045	37.4	N/A
Independent	John Thomas Ball	542	19.4	New
Majority		503	18.0	N/A
Turnout		1,399 (est)	82.3 (est)	N/A
Registered electors		1,700		
Irish Conservative hold		Swing	N/A	
Irish Conservative hold		Swing	N/A	

=== Elections in the 1850s ===
1859 general election: Dublin University (2 seats)
Party	Candidate	Votes	%	±%
Irish Conservative	Anthony Lefroy	Unopposed		
Irish Conservative	James Whiteside	Unopposed		
Registered electors		1,700		
Irish Conservative hold				
Irish Conservative hold				

1859 by-election: Dublin University (1 seat)
Party	Candidate	Votes	%	±%
Irish Conservative	James Whiteside	Unopposed		
Registered electors		1,700		
Irish Conservative hold				

- Caused by Hamilton's resignation.

1858 by-election: Dublin University (1 seat)
Party	Candidate	Votes	%	±%
Irish Conservative	Anthony Lefroy	589	62.7	N/A
Irish Conservative	Arthur Edward Gayer	350	37.2	N/A
Majority		239	25.5	N/A
Turnout		939	55.2	N/A
Registered electors		1,700		
Irish Conservative hold				

- Caused by Napier's appointment as Lord Chancellor of Ireland.

1857 general election: Dublin University (2 seats)
Party	Candidate	Votes	%	±%
Irish Conservative	Joseph Napier	829	41.3	N/A
Irish Conservative	George Alexander Hamilton	791	39.4	N/A
Whig	James Anthony Lawson	272	13.5	New
Whig	John Wilson	116	5.8	New
Majority		519	25.9	N/A
Turnout		1,004 (est)	59.1 (est)	N/A
Registered electors		1,700		
Irish Conservative hold				
Irish Conservative hold				

1852 general election: Dublin University (2 seats)
Party	Candidate	Votes	%	±%
Irish Conservative	Joseph Napier	Unopposed		
Irish Conservative	George Alexander Hamilton	Unopposed		
Registered electors		1,700		
Irish Conservative hold				
Irish Conservative hold				

1852 by-election: Dublin University (1 seat)
Party	Candidate	Votes	%	±%
Irish Conservative	Joseph Napier	Unopposed		
Irish Conservative hold				

- Caused by Napier's appointment as Attorney-General for Ireland.

=== Elections in the 1840s ===
1848 by-election: Dublin University (1 seat)
Party	Candidate	Votes	%	±%
Irish Conservative	Joseph Napier	Unopposed		
Irish Conservative hold				

- Caused by Shaw's resignation.

1847 general election: Dublin University (2 seats)
Party	Candidate	Votes	%	±%
Irish Conservative	George Alexander Hamilton	738	33.1	N/A
Irish Conservative	Frederick Shaw	572	25.6	N/A
Irish Conservative	Joseph Napier	540	24.5	N/A
Whig	James MacCullagh	374	16.8	New
Majority		32	1.1	N/A
Turnout		1,190	56.7	N/A
Registered electors		2,100		
Irish Conservative hold				
Irish Conservative hold				

1843 by-election: Dublin University (1 seat)
Party	Candidate	Votes	%	±%
Irish Conservative	George Alexander Hamilton	Unopposed		
Irish Conservative hold				

- Caused by Jackson's appointment as Justice of the Court of Common Pleas in Ireland.

1842 by-election: Dublin University (1 seat)
Party	Candidate	Votes	%	±%
Irish Conservative	Joseph Devonsher Jackson	Unopposed		
Irish Conservative hold				

- Caused by Lefroy's appointment as Baron of the Court of Exchequer in Ireland.

1841 general election: Dublin University (2 seats)
Party	Candidate	Votes	%	±%
Irish Conservative	Frederick Shaw	Unopposed		
Irish Conservative	Thomas Langlois Lefroy	Unopposed		
Registered electors				
Irish Conservative hold				
Irish Conservative hold				

=== Elections in the 1830s ===
1837 general election: Dublin University (2 seats)
Party	Candidate	Votes	%
Irish Conservative	Frederick Shaw	852	45.4
Irish Conservative	Thomas Langlois Lefroy	839	44.7
Whig	Joseph Stock	186	9.9
Majority		653	34.8
Turnout		940	44.8
Registered electors		2,100	
Irish Conservative hold			
Irish Conservative hold			

1835 general election: Dublin University (2 seats)
Party	Candidate	Votes	%
Irish Conservative	Thomas Langlois Lefroy	Unopposed	
Irish Conservative	Frederick Shaw	Unopposed	
Registered electors		2,074	
Irish Conservative hold			
Irish Conservative hold			

1832 general election: Dublin University (2 seats)
Party	Candidate	Votes	%	±%
Tory	Thomas Langlois Lefroy	1,304	38.3	+10.8
Tory	Frederick Shaw	1,290	37.9	+10.4
Whig	Philip Cecil Crampton	423	12.4	−10.1
Whig	George Ponsonby	390	11.4	−11.1
Majority		867	25.4	+15.4
Turnout		1,724	83.8	−3.2
Registered electors		2,058		
Tory hold		Swing	+10.7	
Tory win (new seat)				

- The constituency gained a second seat at the 1832 general election under the Representation of the People (Ireland) Act 1832.

1831 general election: Dublin University (1 seat)
Party	Candidate	Votes	%	±%
Tory	Thomas Langlois Lefroy	44	55.0	+11.6
Whig	Philip Cecil Crampton	36	45.0	New
Majority		8	10.0	+6.1
Turnout		80	87.0	+7.8
Registered electors		92		
Tory hold		Swing	+11.6	

1830 general election: Dublin University (1 seat)
Party	Candidate	Votes	%
Tory	Thomas Langlois Lefroy	33	43.4
Tory	John Wilson Croker	30	39.5
Tory	John Henry North	13	17.1
Majority		3	3.9
Turnout		76	79.2
Registered electors		96	
Tory hold			

=== Elections in the 1820s ===
1827 by-election: Dublin University (1 seat)
Party	Candidate	Votes	%	±%
Tory	John Wilson Croker	38	42.7	New
Tory	John Henry North	29	32.6	New
Tory	Thomas Langlois Lefroy	22	24.7	New
Majority		9	10.1	N/A
Registered electors				
Tory gain from Whig		Swing	N/A	

- Caused by Plunket's succession to the peerage, becoming Baron Plunket.

1826 general election: Dublin University (1 seat)
Party	Candidate	Votes	%	±%
Whig	William Plunket	Unopposed		
Registered electors				
Whig hold				

1822 by-election: Dublin University (1 seat)
Party	Candidate	Votes	%	±%
Whig	William Plunket	Unopposed		
Whig hold				

- Caused by Plunket's appointment as Attorney-General for Ireland.

1820 general election: Dublin University (1 seat)
Party	Candidate	Votes	%	±%
Whig	William Plunket	Unopposed		
Registered electors				
Whig hold				

=== Elections in the 1810s ===
1818 general election: Dublin University (1 seat)
Party	Candidate	Votes	%	±%
Whig	William Plunket	34	53.1	N/A
Tory	John Wilson Croker	30	46.9	New
Majority		4	6.2	N/A
Registered electors				
Whig hold				

1812 general election: Dublin University (1 seat)
Party	Candidate	Votes	%	±%
Whig	William Plunket	Unopposed		
Registered electors				
Whig gain from Tory				

=== Elections in the 1800s ===
1807 general election: Dublin University (1 seat)
Party	Candidate	Votes	%	±%
Tory	John Leslie Foster	46	92.0	N/A
Whig	Thomas Thornton Macklin	4	8.0	New
Majority		42	84.0	+79.4
Registered electors				
Tory hold				

1806 general election: Dublin University (1 seat)
Party	Candidate	Votes	%	±%
Tory	George Knox	35	52.3	N/A
Tory	John Leslie Foster	32	47.7	N/A
Majority		3	4.6	−10.0
Registered electors				
Tory hold				

1805 by-election: Dublin University (1 seat)
Party	Candidate	Votes	%	±%
Tory	George Knox	Unopposed		
Tory hold				

- Caused by Knox's appointment as a Lord Commissioner of the Treasury.

1802 general election: Dublin University (1 seat)
Party	Candidate	Votes	%	±%
Tory	George Knox	39	57.3	N/A
Whig	William Plunket	29	42.7	New
Majority		10	14.6	N/A
Registered electors				
Tory hold				

1801 co-option: Dublin University (1 seat)
Party	Candidate	Votes	%	±%
Tory	George Knox	Unopposed		
Registered electors				
Tory hold				

- The constituency had two seats in the Irish House of Commons. This was reduced to one seat for the 1801 co-option. Lots were drawn to determine which of the two MPs, George Knox and Arthur Browne, would get the seat.

== See also ==
- List of Irish constituencies
- List of United Kingdom Parliament constituencies in Ireland and Northern Ireland
- Historic Dáil constituencies
- Dáil Éireann (Irish Republic)
