= February 1867 Dublin University by-election =

UK parliamentary by-election

The February 1867 Dublin University by-election was held on 12 February 1867. The by-election was held due to the incumbent Conservative MP, John Edward Walsh, becoming Master of the Rolls in Ireland. It was won by the unopposed Conservative candidate Hedges Eyre Chatterton.
