= March 1867 Dublin University by-election =

UK parliamentary by-election

The March 1867 Dublin University by-election was held on 30 March 1867. The by-election was held due to the incumbent Conservative MP, Hedges Eyre Chatterton, becoming Attorney-General for Ireland. It was retained by the incumbent.
