= Mary Henry (doctor) =

Irish former politician and medical doctor (born 1940)

Senator
- In office 17 February 1993 – 13 September 2007
- Constituency: Dublin University

Personal details
- Born: 11 May 1940 (age 86) Blackrock, Cork, Ireland
- Party: Independent
- Education: Trinity College Dublin

Mary Elizabeth Frances Henry (born 11 May 1940 in Blackrock, Cork) is an Irish former politician and medical doctor. She was an independent member of Seanad Éireann. She was elected Pro-Chancellor of the University of Dublin in 2012. By profession she is a University Professor and medical practitioner. In 1966 she married John McEntagart of Dublin, Merchant and they have three children. She is a member of the Church of Ireland.

She is a graduate of the Trinity College Dublin (B.A. in English and History of Medicine 1963, M.B. (Honours) (1965), M.A. (1966) M.D. (1968)). As an undergraduate, among many other distinctions she won the Sir James Craig Memorial Prize in Medicine.

She represented the Dublin University constituency in the Seanad from 1993 until 2007.

From 1997 she served a two-year term as president of The Irish Association for Cultural, Economic and Social Relations.

She did not stand in the 2007 Seanad election, and Ivana Bacik was elected to succeed her.
