= August 1867 Dublin University by-election =

UK parliamentary by-election

The August 1867 Dublin University by-election was held on 27 August 1867. The by-election was held due to the incumbent Conservative MP, Hedges Eyre Chatterton, becoming Vice-Chancellor of Ireland. It was won by the unopposed Conservative candidate Robert Warren.
