= 1903 Dublin University by-election =

UK Parliamentary by-election

The 1903 Dublin University by-election was a Parliamentary by-election held from 28 February to 5 March 1903 for one of the two seats of the Dublin University constituency. The constituency returned one Member of Parliament (MP) to the House of Commons of the United Kingdom, elected by the first past the post voting system for the by-election.

The seat had become vacant following the resignation of the incumbent Liberal Unionist MP, W. E. H. Lecky due to ill health. Lecky vacated his Parliamentary seat by being appointed Steward of the Chiltern Hundreds on 18 February 1903. Lecky had been Member of Parliament for the constituency since an 1895 by-election. The Irish Unionist Alliance gained the seat from the Liberal Unionist Party.

== Candidates ==
Janes Henry Mussen Campbell was the Solicitor-General for Ireland, a post he had held since 1901. He had been made an Irish Queen's Counsel in 1892, and in February 1902 was elected a Bencher of Gray's Inn.

He had been elected Irish Unionist MP for the seat of Dublin St Stephen's Green in an 1898 by-election but lost the seat at the 1900 general election.

Arthur Warren Samuels was a barrister who had been made a Queen's Counsel in 1894. He had been called to the Irish Bar in 1877 and the English Bar in 1896.

Both candidates were Unionists.

It was reported that the members of the Irish Bar who had votes supported Campbell over Samuels.

== Result ==
1903 Dublin University by-election
Party	Candidate	Votes	%	±%
Irish Unionist	James Campbell	1,492	51.2	N/A
Irish Unionist	Arthur Samuels	1,421	48.8	N/A
Majority		71	2.4	N/A
Turnout		2,913	64.0	N/A
Registered electors		4,553		
Irish Unionist gain from Liberal Unionist		Swing	N/A	
