= Clonan =

Clonan is a surname. Notable people with the surname include:

- Kristina Clonan (born 1998), Australian racing cyclist
- Tom Clonan (fl. 1987), Irish politician
