= 1887 Dublin University by-election =

UK Parliamentary by-election

The 1887 Dublin University by-election was a parliamentary by-election held for the United Kingdom House of Commons constituency of Dublin University on 7–12 July 1887.

The by-election resulted from the resignation of Hugh Holmes, one of the members in this two-seat constituency, following his appointment as a high court judge. Two candidates were nominated: Richard Clere Parsons, an engineer and third son of the Earl of Rosse, and Dodgson Hamilton Madden, a serjeant-at-law. Parsons received 712 votes; Madden received 1,376 and was therefore elected.

John Thomas Ball, a former Lord Chancellor of Ireland, was on Madden's support committee and seconded his nomination on 7 July. At the time, Ball was one of the Lords Justices of Ireland deputising for Charles Vane-Tempest-Stewart, 6th Marquess of Londonderry, the absent Lord Lieutenant of Ireland. Members of the Irish Parliamentary Party complained in the Commons that Ball's action was inappropriate.

== Result ==
1887 Dublin University by-election
Party	Candidate	Votes	%	±%
Irish Unionist	Dodgson Madden	1,376	65.9	N/A
Irish Unionist	Richard Clare Parsons	712	34.1	N/A
Majority		664	31.8	N/A
Turnout		2,088	51.0	N/A
Registered electors		4,092		
Irish Unionist hold		Swing	N/A	
