= Aubrey McCarthy =

Irish politician

Senator Aubrey McCarthy
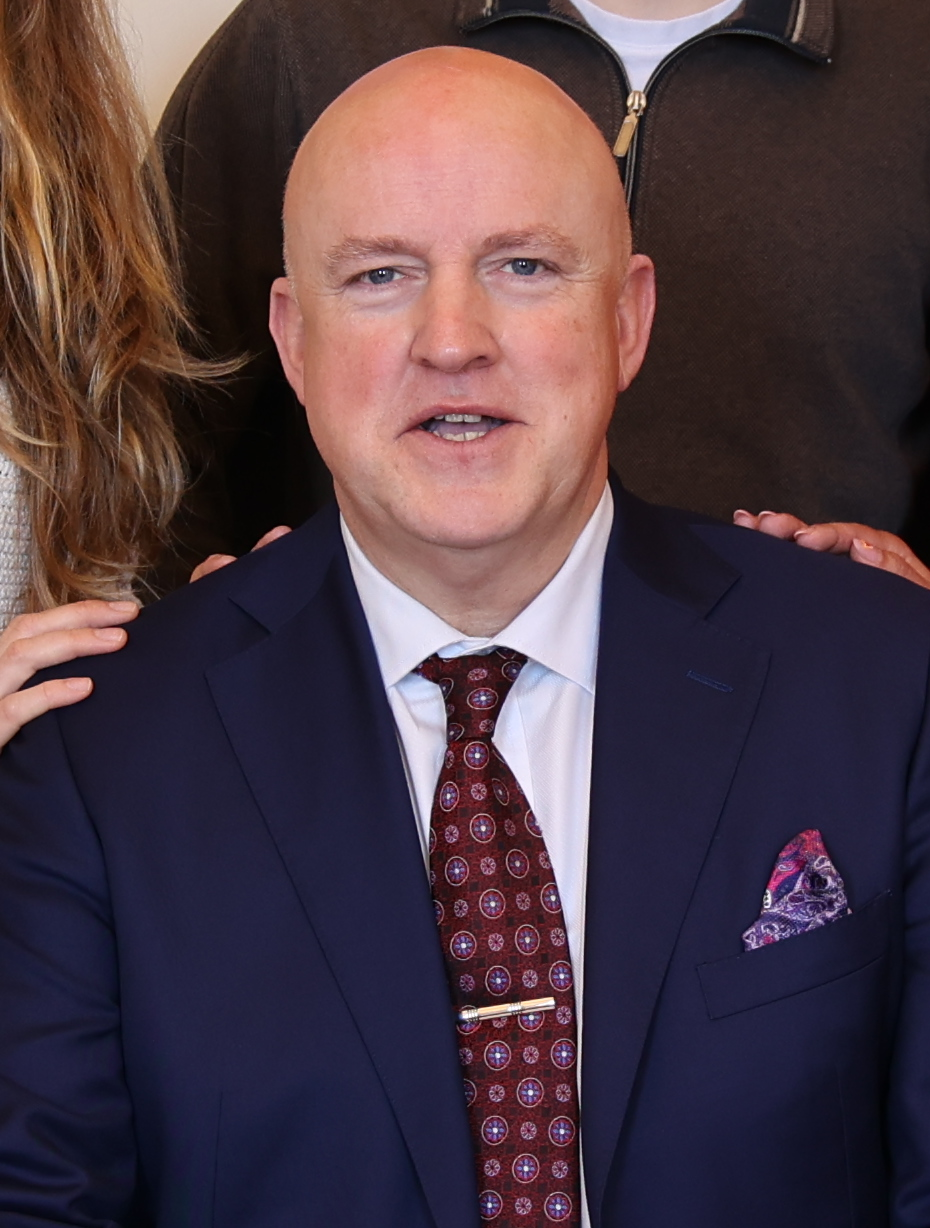
- McCarthy in 2025

Senator
- Incumbent
- Assumed office January 2025
- Constituency: Dublin University

Personal details
- Party: Independent
- Education: Trinity College Dublin; Dublin City University; University of Wales
- Website: aubreymccarthy.com

Aubrey McCarthy is an independent member of Seanad Éireann who has represented Dublin University since 2025.

McCarthy is a graduate of Trinity College Dublin with a Bachelor of Science degree and a master's degree. He was also educated at Dublin City University and the University of Wales. In 2008 he founded Tiglin, a charity that provides housing, rehabilitation and education and employment access for homeless people and those affected by addiction. He is also chair of the Bluebell Community Council, Tivoli Training Centre and the Dublin Christian Mission Outreach. In 2026 it was reported that he was "probably" the wealthiest member of Seanad Éireann.

He was awarded the Irish Red Cross Humanitarian of the Year Award in 2024 and the Trinity Alumni Award in 2023. He has spoken at many public forums including the Fianna Fail Ardfheis, Aontú Ardfheis, as well as the Citizens Assembly, about his work on homelessness and the services offered by Tiglin. In 2024 he received personal threats over the work his charity was doing to help asylum seekers without accommodation.

He contested the 2022 Seanad by-election caused by the election of Labour's Ivana Bacik to Dáil Éireann, finishing in sixth place overall. At the 2025 Seanad election, he was elected for Dublin University, narrowly beating Green Party candidate Hazel Chu for the final seat after a recount.

During the 2025 presidential election campaign, McCarthy was one of 18 Oireachtas members who had agreed to nominate conservative campaigner, Maria Steen as a candidate; however she did not make the ballot as she required 20 nominations.
