= William Fearon =

Irish politician and academic (1892–1959)

Senator
- In office 8 September 1943 – 27 December 1959
- Constituency: Dublin University

Personal details
- Born: 14 October 1892 Dublin, Ireland
- Died: 27 December 1959 (aged 67) Dublin, Ireland
- Party: Independent
- Education: Trinity College Dublin; Emmanuel College, Cambridge

William Robert Fearon (14 October 1892 – 27 December 1959) was an Irish politician and academic. He was an independent member of Seanad Éireann from 1943 to 1959.

He was educated at St Andrew's College, Dublin and Trinity College Dublin. He received a BA in natural science in 1915, and then entered medical school, although it was several years before he took his medical degree. He was a Mackinnon research student of the Royal Society from 1919 to 1921, studying biochemistry at Emmanuel College, Cambridge.

He was first elected to the Seanad in 1943 for the Dublin University constituency. He was re-elected at the 1944, 1948, 1951, 1954 and 1957 elections. He died while still in office, and William J. E. Jessop won the subsequent by-election.

He was Professor of Biochemistry at Trinity College Dublin. In 1937, he wrote a play called Parnell of Avondale.

He died on 27 December 1959, aged 67, at Monkstown Hospital, Dublin; he never married.
