= William J. E. Jessop =

Irish academic and politician (1902–1980)

Senator
- In office 13 May 1960 – 1 June 1973
- In office 12 March 1952 – 22 July 1954
- Constituency: Dublin University

Personal details
- Born: 11 July 1902 County Westmeath, Ireland
- Died: 11 June 1980 (aged 77) Dublin, Ireland
- Party: Independent
- Spouse: Kathleen Condell (m. 1930)
- Children: 4
- Education: Trinity College Dublin

William John Edward Jessop (11 July 1902 – 11 June 1980) was an Irish academic, medical practitioner and an independent member of Seanad Éireann.

Jessop was born on 11 July 1902 near Mullingar, County Westmeath, the eldest of three sons of John Brabason Jessop, a farmer, and Mary Jane Jessop (née Anderson).

He was a professor of Social Medicine at Trinity College Dublin (TCD). he was appointed professor of physiology and biochemistry in the Royal College of Surgeons in 1929, and served as physician at the Meath Hospital from 1930 to 1980.

He was elected to the 7th Seanad on 12 March 1952 at a by-election for the Dublin University constituency caused by the resignation of Gardner Budd. He was defeated at the 1954 Seanad election but was again elected at a by-election on 13 May 1960 caused by the death of William Fearon. He was re-elected to the 10th (1961), 11th (1965) and 12th (1969) Seanad. He lost his seat at the 1973 Seanad election.

Following his retirement from TCD, he became visiting professor of chemical pathology at the University of Ife in Nigeria.
