= 1916 Dublin University by-election =

UK Parliamentary by-election

The 1916 Dublin University by-election was held on 25 April 1916. The by-election was held due to the incumbent Irish Unionist MP, James Campbell, becoming Attorney General for Ireland. The seat was retained by Campbell who was unopposed due to a War-time electoral pact.
