= Trevor West =

Irish politician and academic (1938–2012)

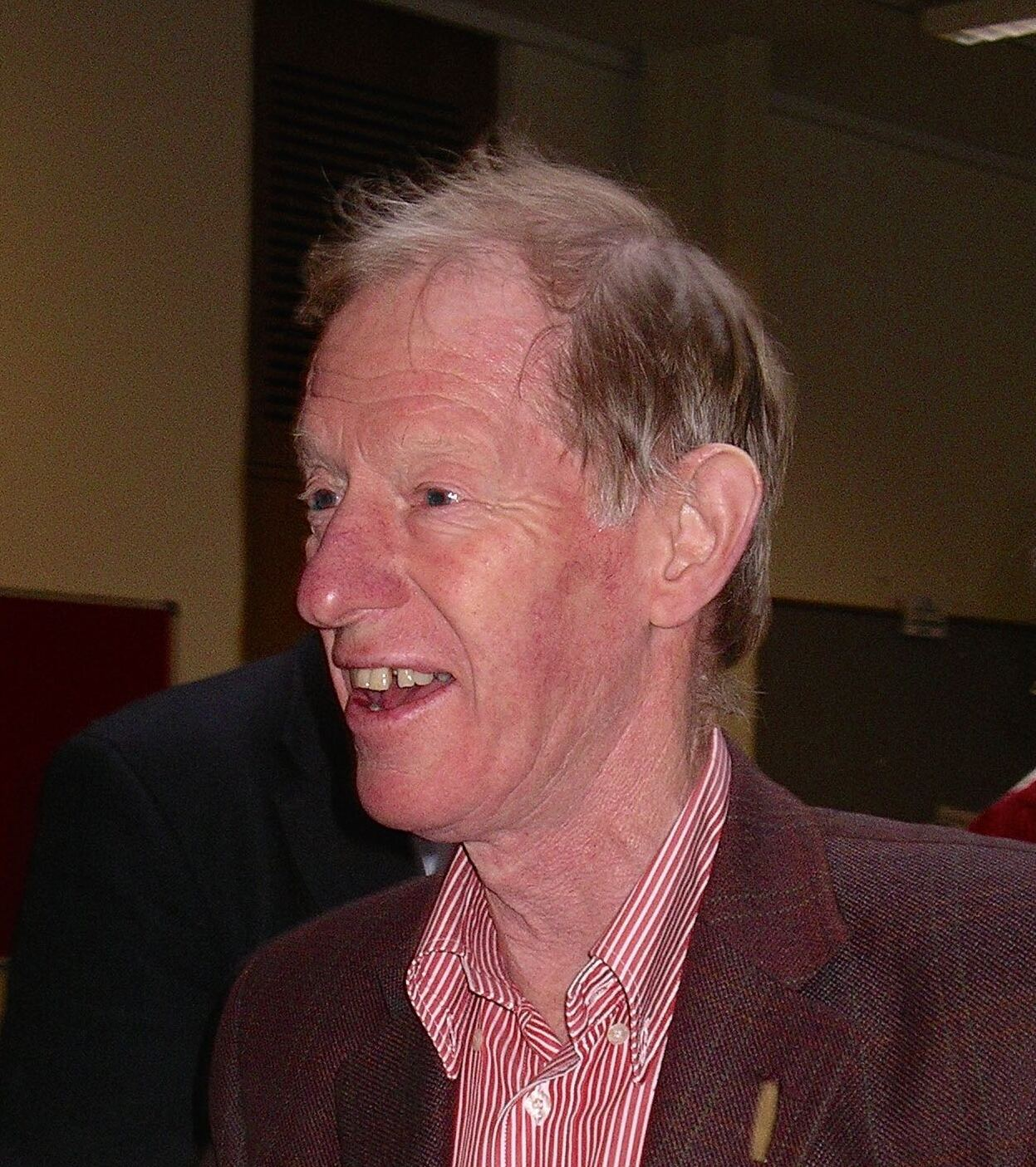
- West in 2005

Senator
- In office 13 May 1982 – 23 February 1983
- In office 19 November 1970 – 8 October 1981
- Constituency: Dublin University

Personal details
- Born: Timothy Trevor West; 8 May 1938 County Cork, Ireland
- Died: 30 October 2012 (aged 74) County Cork, Ireland
- Party: Independent
- Spouse: Maura Lee (m. 1995)
- Education: Midleton College; Trinity College Dublin; University of Cambridge

Timothy Trevor West (8 May 1938 – 30 October 2012) was an Irish mathematician, academic and politician.

== Biography ==
He was born on 8 May 1938 in County Cork, the eldest of four sons of Timothy Roberts West, headmaster of Midleton College, and Dorothy West (née McNeill).

He was educated at Midleton College, and The High School, Dublin. West was a graduate of Trinity College Dublin (TCD), where he was elected a scholar, and of the University of Cambridge. In 1970 he was elected a Fellow of Trinity College Dublin and was also an associate professor of mathematics, Junior Dean, and a great supporter of sport at Trinity. He was also a Member of the Royal Irish Academy. He subsequently was a Senior Fellow of TCD.

On 19 November 1970, West was elected to Seanad Éireann, at a by-election for the Dublin University constituency caused by the death of Owen Sheehy-Skeffington. After his election, he established a reputation as one of the few liberal voices in the Seanad. He was re-elected to the Seanad in 1973 and 1977, lost his seat at the 1981 Seanad election but was re-elected in 1982, then lost his seat again at the 1983 Seanad election.

With John T. Lewis and D. McQuillan, West drew up the constitution of the Irish Mathematical Society.

He was the author of The Bold Collegians, a history of sport in Trinity College, and was an avid follower of Trinity College's sports programs. He also wrote a history of Midleton College, published for its tercentenary in 1996.

== Memorials ==
An event was held in his memory at the Royal Irish Academy in December 2013 where a memorial issue of the Mathematical Proceedings of the Royal Irish Academy was presented.

A book of essays celebrating his life, Trevor West : The Bold Collegian, was published in October 2016.

On 14 September 2018, a new sports hall in Midleton College dedicated to the memory of Trevor West was opened by the Provost of Trinity College, Patrick Prendergast.

== Publications ==
- Trevor West, with Rien Kaashoek, Locally compact semi-algebras : with applications to spectral theory of positive operators (Amsterdam; London: North-Holland Publishing Co., 1974)
- Trevor West, The Bold Collegians. The Development of Sport in Trinity College Dublin (Dublin, 1991)
- Trevor West, Midleton College, 1696–1996: A Tercentenary History (Midleton: Midleton College, 1996)
