= William Thrift =

Irish politician and academic (1870–1942)

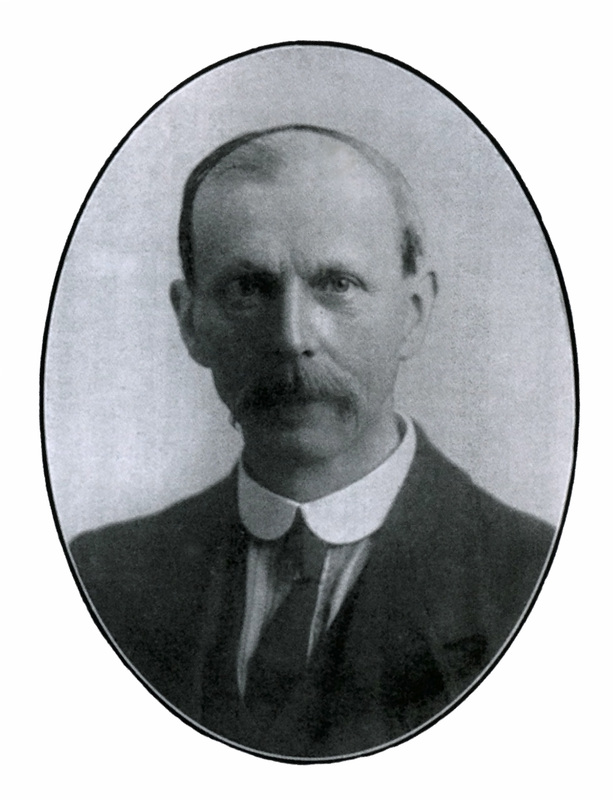
- Thrift in 1917

37th Provost of Trinity College Dublin
- In office 1 August 1937 – 23 April 1942
- Preceded by: Edward Gwynn
- Succeeded by: Ernest Alton

Teachta Dála
- In office May 1921 – July 1937
- Constituency: Dublin University

Personal details
- Born: 28 February 1870 Halifax, West Yorkshire, England
- Died: 23 April 1942 (aged 72) Dublin, Ireland
- Party: Independent
- Spouse: Etta Thrift (m. 1892)
- Children: 6
- Education: Trinity College Dublin

William Edward Thrift (28 February 1870 – 23 April 1942) was an Irish academic and politician who served as the 37th Provost of Trinity College Dublin and a Teachta Dála (TD) for the Dublin University constituency from 1921 to 1937.

Thrift was born in Halifax, West Yorkshire in 1870, but grew up in Carlow. He was educated at The High School, Dublin and at Trinity College Dublin (TCD) (BA 1893, MA 1896, Fellow 1896). He served as Erasmus Smith's Professor of Natural and Experimental Philosophy at Trinity College Dublin from 1901 to 1929. He was awarded DSc in 1936. He was appointed Provost of Trinity College Dublin in 1937, serving until his death 1942.

He was also active in politics. He was elected to the House of Commons of Southern Ireland at the 1921 elections, representing the Dublin University constituency. As an independent Unionist, he did not participate in the Second Dáil. He was re-elected for the same constituency at the 1922 general election and became a member of the 3rd Dáil. He was re-elected at the next five general elections until 1937 when he retired from politics.

Academic offices
Preceded by Edward Gwynn	Provost of Trinity College Dublin; 1937–1942	Succeeded by Ernest Alton

Dáil	Election	Deputy (Party)	Deputy (Party)	Deputy (Party)	Deputy (Party)
1st	1918	Arthur Samuels (U)	Robert Woods (Ind U)	2 seats under 1918 Act	
1st	1919 by-election	William Jellett (U)	Robert Woods (Ind U)	2 seats under 1918 Act	
2nd	1921	Ernest Alton (Ind U)	James Craig (Ind U)	William Thrift (Ind U)	Gerald Fitzgibbon (Ind U)
3rd	1922	Ernest Alton (Ind.)	James Craig (Ind.)	William Thrift (Ind.)	Gerald Fitzgibbon (Ind.)
4th	1923	Ernest Alton (Ind.)	James Craig (Ind.)	William Thrift (Ind.)	3 seats from 1923
5th	1927 (Jun)	Ernest Alton (Ind.)	James Craig (Ind.)	William Thrift (Ind.)	3 seats from 1923
6th	1927 (Sep)	Ernest Alton (Ind.)	James Craig (Ind.)	William Thrift (Ind.)	3 seats from 1923
7th	1932	Ernest Alton (Ind.)	James Craig (Ind.)	William Thrift (Ind.)	3 seats from 1923
8th	1933	Ernest Alton (Ind.)	James Craig (Ind.)	William Thrift (Ind.)	3 seats from 1923
8th	1933 by-election	Ernest Alton (Ind.)	Robert Rowlette (Ind.)	William Thrift (Ind.)	3 seats from 1923
