= 1888 Dublin University by-election =

UK Parliamentary by-election

The 1888 Dublin University by-election was a parliamentary by-election held for the United Kingdom House of Commons constituency of Dublin University on 3 February 1888. When one of the members in this two-seat constituency, Dodgson Hamilton Madden, was appointed Solicitor-General for Ireland, the rule at the time required him to submit to re-election. Madden was the only candidate in the by-election and was therefore elected unopposed.
