= 1886 Dublin University by-election =

UK parliamentary by-election

The 1886 Dublin University by-election was a parliamentary by-election held for the United Kingdom House of Commons constituency of Dublin University on 13 August 1886. Following the general election of that year and the formation of a new government, both elected members in this two-seat constituency were appointed to government posts: David Plunket as First Commissioner of Works, and Hugh Holmes as Attorney-General for Ireland. According to the rules of the era, this required them to submit to re-election. No other candidate was nominated for either seat, and Plunket and Holmes were therefore elected unopposed: Plunket at 11 o'clock and Holmes at 12.
