= 1900 Dublin University by-election =

UK Parliamentary by-election

The 1900 Dublin University by-election was a parliamentary by-election held for the United Kingdom House of Commons constituency of Dublin University on 16 May 1900.

When one of the members in this two-seat constituency, Edward Carson, was appointed Solicitor General for England and Wales, the rule at the time required him to submit to re-election. Carson was the only candidate in the by-election and was therefore elected unopposed.
