= February 1875 Dublin University by-election =

UK parliamentary by-election

The February 1875 Dublin University by-election was held on 11 February 1875. The by-election was held due to the incumbent Conservative MP, David Robert Plunket, becoming Solicitor General for Ireland. It was retained by the incumbent.
