= 1895 Dublin University by-election =

UK Parliamentary by-election

The 1895 Dublin University by-election was a Parliamentary by-election held on 2–6 December 1895. The constituency returned two Members of Parliament (MPs) to the House of Commons of the United Kingdom, elected by the first past the post voting system.

The seat had become vacant when the Unionist Member of Parliament, David Plunket was elevated to the peerage as Baron Rathmore on 14 November 1895. Plunket had been a Member of Parliament for the constituency since an 1870 by-election. The by-election was won by the Liberal Unionist Party who gained the seat from the Irish Unionist Alliance.

== Candidates ==
W. E. H. Lecky stood as a Liberal Unionist candidate. He was an essayist and historian. He was the author of History of England in the XVIIIth Century among other works.

Lecky was an honorary LL.D. of Dublin, St Andrew's, and Cambridge Universities, and an honorary D.C.L. of the University of Oxford.

George Wright stood as a Unionist candidate. He was a barrister. He had been called to the Irish Bar in 1871 and Queen's Counsel in 1884.

He would go on to be Solicitor-General for Ireland from 1900 to 1901, and then a Justice of the High Court of Justice in Ireland.

== Campaign ==
Lecky's religious opinions, as expressed in History Of The Rise And Influence Of The Spirit Of Rationalism In Europe (1865), were criticised as being atheistic.

It was suggested that the Fellows and Professors of the university supported Lecky, while the students and out-voters supported Wright.

== Result ==
1895 Dublin University by-election
Party	Candidate	Votes	%	±%
Liberal Unionist	W. E. H. Lecky	1,757	63.5	N/A
Irish Unionist	George Wright	1,011	36.5	N/A
Majority		746	27.0	N/A
Turnout		2,768	61.4	N/A
Registered electors		4,506		
Liberal Unionist gain from Irish Unionist		Swing	N/A	
