= 1874 Dublin University by-election =

UK Parliamentary by-election

The 1874 Dublin University by-election was held on 16 March 1874. The by-election was held due to the incumbent Conservative MP, John Thomas Ball, becoming Attorney General for Ireland. It was retained by the incumbent.
