= January 1875 Dublin University by-election =

UK parliamentary by-election

The January 1875 Dublin University by-election was held on 18–22 January 1875. The by-election was held due to the resignation of the incumbent Conservative MP, John Thomas Ball on his appointment as Lord Chancellor of Ireland. It was won by the Conservative candidate Edward Gibson.

By-election, 21 Jan 1875: Dublin University
Party	Candidate	Votes	%	±%
Irish Conservative	Edward Gibson	1,210	48.3	N/A
Irish Conservative	Alexander Edward Miller	759	30.3	N/A
Irish Conservative	Anthony Traill	538	21.5	N/A
Majority		451	18.0	N/A
Turnout		2,507	102.8*	N/A
Registered electors		2,438		
Irish Conservative hold				

* Walker recorded the vote tally as above, but the electorate he also included was a lower number - at 2,438 - and so this result may be inaccurate.
