= 2022 Seanad by-election =

By-election to the 26th Seanad

A by-election was held for the Seanad Éireann Dublin University constituency in Ireland in March 2022. Ballot papers were issued on 25 February and polls closed at 11 a.m. on 30 March 2022. The election was won by former army officer and whistleblower Tom Clonan.

== Background ==
The vacancy was caused by the election of Labour's Ivana Bacik to Dáil Éireann on 8 July 2021 at a by-election in Dublin Bay South. On 10 November 2021, the Seanad passed a motion calling on the clerk of the Seanad to send notice to the Minister for Housing, Local Government and Heritage of the vacancy. The minister was required to make the order for a by-election within six months of this notice.

== Election system ==
Every citizen of Ireland who is at least 18 years old and who has received a degree (other than an honorary degree) or obtained a scholarship from Trinity College Dublin is entitled to be registered as an elector. The electorate of the university is approximately 70,000. When a casual vacancy occurs it is filled by a by-election. The procedure at a by-election is the same as that at a general election of university members. Candidates must be proposed and seconded by two registered electors, with the assent of eight other electors. All votes are cast by postal ballot, and are counted using the single transferable vote.

== Candidates ==
Seventeen candidates were nominated. All nominations are non-partisan, with no provision for nomination by parties as there is in Dáil elections. These include, ordered by the date of their declaration:

- Tom Clonan, former soldier, declared on 10 July 2021
- Hugo MacNeill, former rugby player, declared on 21 July 2021
- Gisèle Scanlon, Trinity College Dublin Graduate Students' Union President, declared on 21 July 2021
- Ryan Alberto Ó Giobúin, sociology PhD researcher, declared on 21 September 2021
- Ursula Quill, Bacik's former assistant and a Labour Party member
- Ray Bassett, former diplomat, declared on 1 November 2021
- Sadhbh O'Neill, academic at Dublin City University declared in November 2021
- Eoin Barry, Labour Party member, declared in December 2021
- Ade Oluborode, barrister, declared in January 2022.
- Michael McDermott, PhD student at Trinity College Dublin, declared in January 2022.
- Maureen Gaffney, psychologist, author, broadcaster, declared in February 2022
- Hazel Chu, Green Party councillor and former Lord Mayor of Dublin, declared in February 2022
- Aubrey McCarthy, founder of the homelessness and rehabilitation charity Tiglin, declared on 10 February 2022
- Patricia McKenna, former Member of the European Parliament for Dublin and former Cathaoirleach of the People's Movement, declared on 12 February 2022
- Catherine Stocker, Social Democrats councillor for Dublin City, declared in February 2022

== Result ==
2022 Seanad by-election: Dublin University
Party	Candidate	FPv%	Count															
Party	Candidate	FPv%	1	2	3	4	5	6	7	8	9	10	11	12	13	14	15	16
Independent	Hugo MacNeill	15.4	2,068	2,071	2,075	2,085	2,092	2,102	2,121	2,153	2,250	2,290	2,312	2,391	2,624	2,863		
Independent	Tom Clonan	14.5	1,947	1,952	1,976	1,990	2,014	2,040	2,077	2,137	2,243	2,332	2,436	2,637	2,973	3,359	4,200	5,358
Independent	Maureen Gaffney	14.0	1,882	1,884	1,892	1,913	1,936	1,972	1,993	2,066	2,121	2,190	2,274	2,438	2,641	3,083	3,908	5,198
Green Party	Hazel Chu (Note: Indication of party membership. No party labels appeared on the ballot.)	13.2	1,766	1,770	1,785	1,802	1,823	1,842	1,858	1,918	1,955	2,090	2,272	2,583	2,743	3,300	3,683	
Labour Party	Ursula Quill	8.6	1,156	1,159	1,178	1,205	1,226	1,246	1,290	1,325	1,368	1,430	1,525	1,773	1,890			
Independent	Aubrey McCarthy	7.1	947	950	954	962	977	997	1,012	1,033	1,115	1,139	1,187	1,281				
Independent	Sadhbh O'Neill	6.5	870	873	879	896	909	931	940	991	1,030	1,105	1,186					
Social Democrats	Catherine Stocker	3.9	521	521	530	541	548	563	576	600	608	657						
Independent	Ade Oluborode	3.5	471	479	488	500	508	528	548	576	586							
Independent	Ray Bassett	3.4	458	458	458	463	475	480	497	544								
Independent	Patricia McKenna	3.1	421	421	427	434	440	454	463									
Independent	Paula Roseingrave	1.5	200	200	202	209	220											
Labour Party	Eoin Barry	1.4	189	192	199	199												
Independent	Ryan Alberto Ó Giobúin	1.4	182	183	195	202	222	230										
Independent	Gisèle Scanlon	1.3	170	170	174													
Independent	Michael McDermott	1.0	132	134														
Independent	Abbas Ali O'Shea	0.3	38															
Electorate: 67,788 Valid: 13,418 Spoilt: 16 Quota: 6,710 Turnout: 13,434 (19.8%)

== See also ==
- List of Seanad by-elections
