= Gardner Budd =

Irish judge, barrister and politician (1904–1976)

Judge of the Supreme Court
- In office 21 December 1966 – 13 January 1975
- Nominated by: Government of Ireland
- Appointed by: Éamon de Valera

Judge of the High Court
- In office 3 October 1951 – 20 December 1966
- Nominated by: Government of Ireland
- Appointed by: Seán T. O'Kelly

Senator
- In office 14 August 1951 – 2 October 1951
- Constituency: Dublin University

Personal details
- Born: Frederick Gardner Orford Budd; 11 April 1904 Dublin, Ireland
- Died: 9 February 1976 (aged 71) Dublin, Ireland
- Spouse: Oonagh Blennerhasset (m. 1931)
- Children: 4
- Education: Trinity College Dublin; King's Inns

Frederick Gardner Orford Budd (11 April 1904 – 9 February 1976) was an Irish judge, barrister and politician who served as a Judge of the Supreme Court from 1966 to 1975, a Judge of the High Court from 1951 to 1966, and a Senator for the Dublin University constituency for a number of months in 1951 prior to his appointment to the High Court.

In 1925, he was a scholar of Trinity College Dublin studying Modern History and Political Science.

He was elected to Seanad Éireann as an Independent Senator in August 1951 for the Dublin University constituency. He resigned from the Seanad on 2 October 1951, following his appointment as a judge of the High Court. William J. E. Jessop won the subsequent by-election.

He was appointed to the Supreme Court of Ireland in 1966 and served on the court until 1975. He is credited for his role in some of the most progressive decisions of the Supreme Court during his time, often forming a 3/2 majority with Judge Brian Walsh and Chief Justice Cearbhall O Dalaigh.

Budd married Oonah Blennerhassett in August 1931 and they had one son, (Declan Budd, a High Court justice who also sat on the Court of Criminal Appeal), and three daughters.
