= 1877 Dublin University by-election =

UK Parliamentary by-election

The 1877 Dublin University by-election was fought on 13 February 1877. The by-election was held due to the incumbent Conservative MP, Edward Gibson, becoming Attorney-General for Ireland. It was retained by the incumbent.
