= October 1917 Dublin University by-election =

UK parliamentary by-election

The October 1917 Dublin University by-election was held on 5 October 1917. The by-election was held due to the incumbent Irish Unionist MP, Arthur Samuels, becoming Solicitor-General for Ireland. It was retained by Samuels who was unopposed due to a War-time electoral pact.
