= 1857 United Kingdom general election in Ireland =

- 27 March – 24 April 1857

105 of the 670 seats to the House of Commons
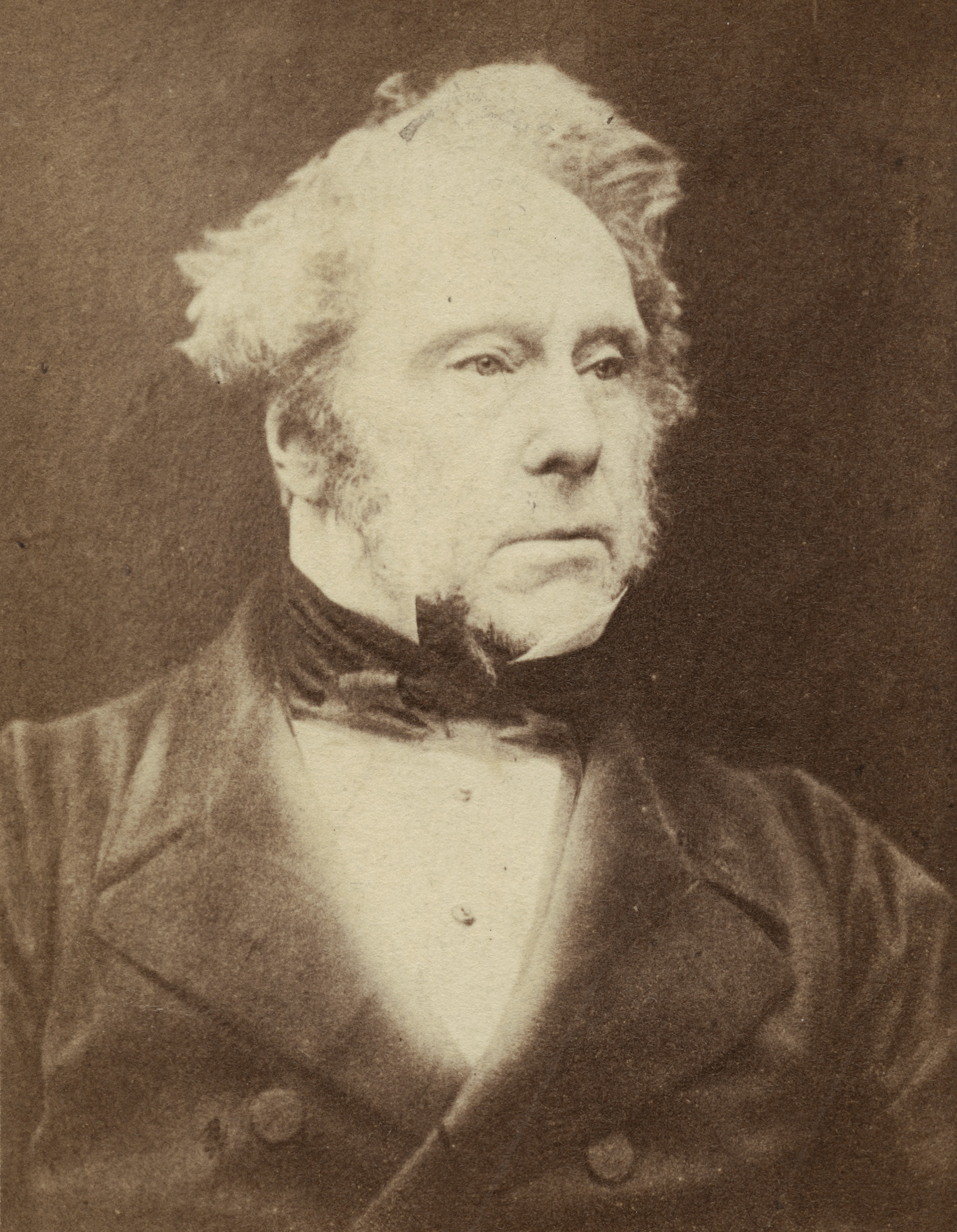

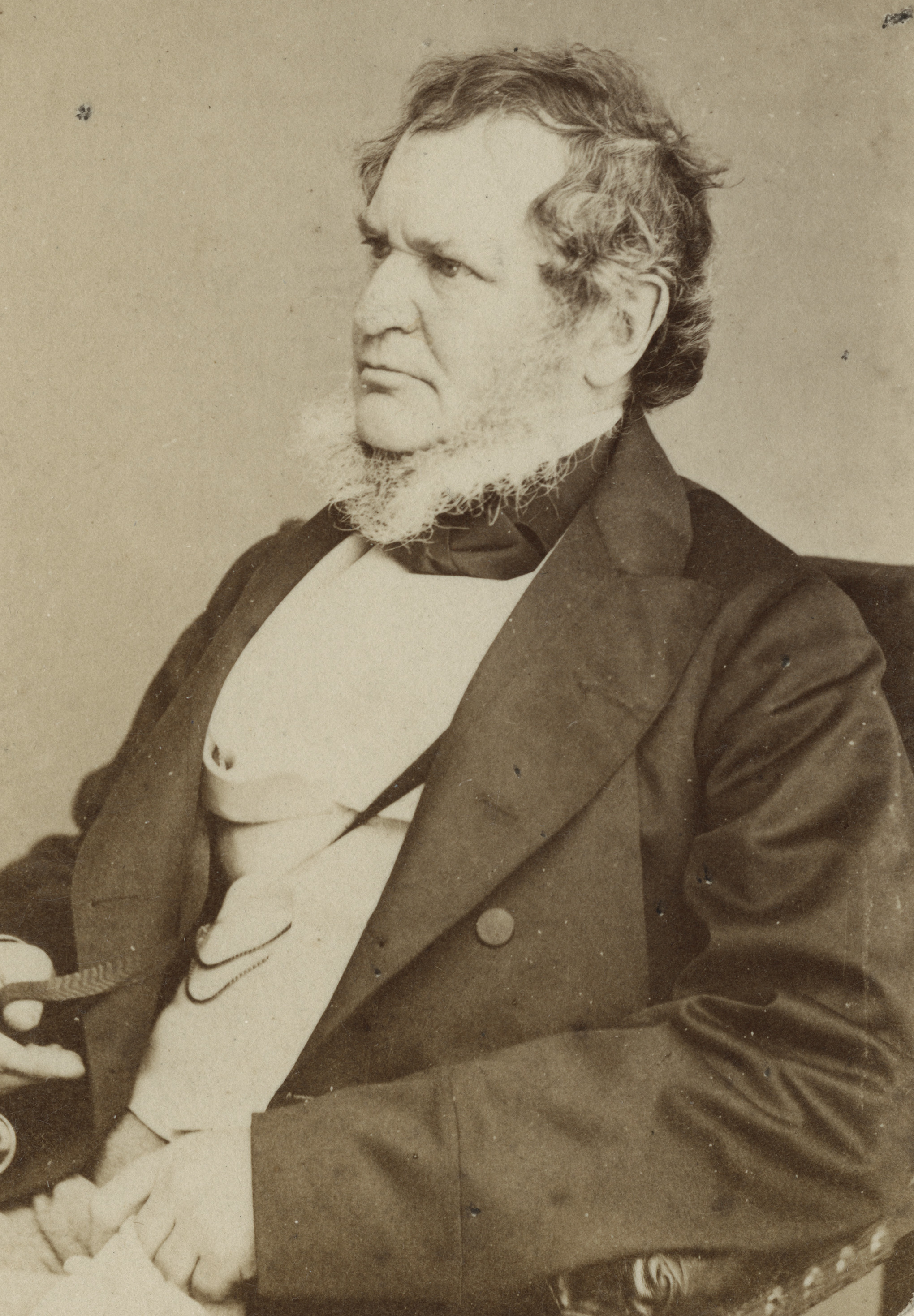

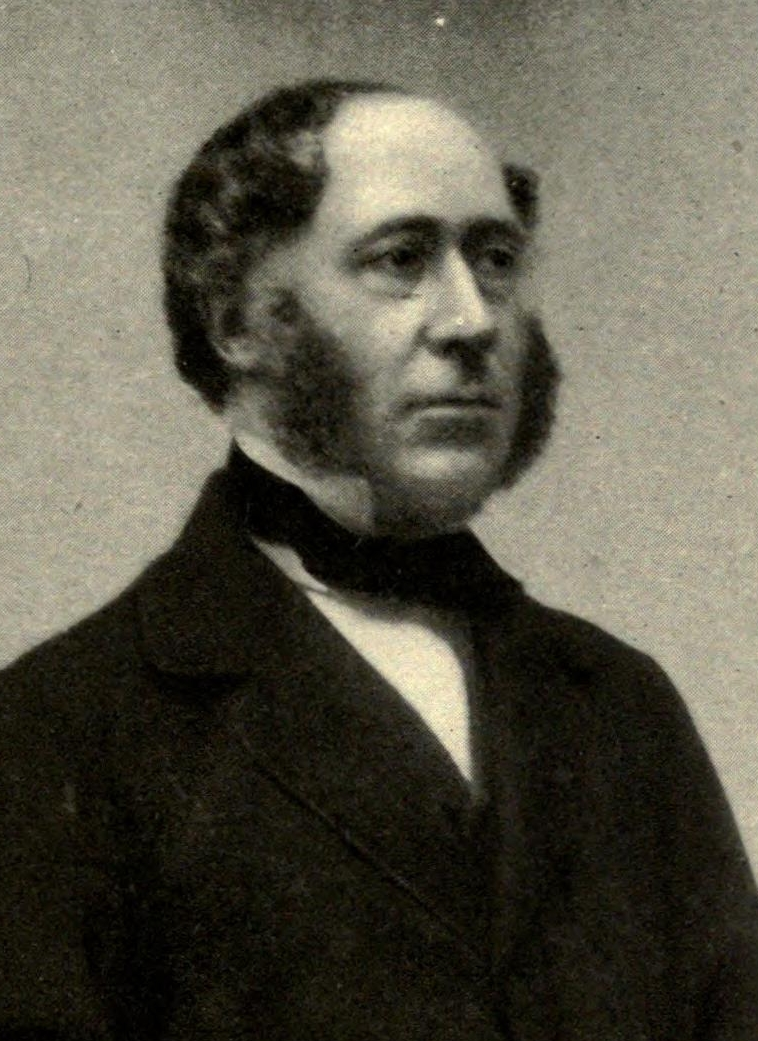
	First party	Second party	Third party
Leader	Viscount Palmerston	Earl of Derby	George Henry Moore
Party	Whig	Conservative	Independent Irish
Leader since	6 February 1855	July 1846	October 1855
Leader's seat	Tiverton	House of Lords	County Mayo (defeated)
Last election	63 seats	42 seats	13 seats
Seats won	48	44	13
Seat change	▼15	▲2	Steady
Popular vote	67,935	61,741	12,099
Percentage	47.8%	43.6%	8.6%
Swing	▼4.9%	▼2.7%	N/A

The 1857 British general election in Ireland produced a victory in Ireland for the Whigs under Lord Palmerston. The election was the first to be contested by the Independent Irish Party under their own banner. The Independent Irish Party had been formed following the 1852 election by Liberal candidates who had pledged to form an independent party in parliament should they be elected. A total of 48 Liberal candidates made the pledge.

The election underscored Ireland's integration into UK parliamentary politics, with the success of the Whig party reflecting Catholic support of Palmerston's post-Famine stability measures over Conservatives and landlords.

At the election, the Independent Irish Party had adopted a pledge-bound electoral approach to produce candidates committed to "independent opposition" who supported land reform, fair rents and tenure security. Notable candidates included George Henry Moore, the Tenant League chairman, who won re-election in Mayo but was later unseated by parliamentary petition over alleged undue clerical influence to be replaced by his Tory rival.

== Results ==
Party	Candidates	Unopposed	Seats	Seats change	Votes	%	% Change
Whigs	77	27	48	▼15	67,935	47.8	▼4.9
Conservative & Peelite	52	14	42	▲2	61,741	43.6	▼2.7
Independent Irish	19	4	13	▲13	12,099	8.6	N/A
	148	45	103	Steady	141,775	100.0	

Popular vote
Whigs	47.92%
Irish Conservative	43.55%
Independent Irish	8.54%

Parliamentary seats
Whigs	46.60%
Irish Conservative	40.78%
Independent Irish	12.62%

=== University Constituencies ===
1857 General Election: Dublin University (2 seats)
Party	Candidate	Votes	%	±%
Conservative	Rt Hon. Joseph Napier	829	41.28	
Conservative	George Alexander Hamilton	791	39.39	
Whig	James Anthony Lawson	272	13.55	
Whig	John Wilson	116	5.78	
Majority		557	27.73	
Conservative hold		Swing		
Conservative hold		Swing		
Turnout		2,008	59.06	N/A

== See also ==
- History of Ireland (1801–1923)
