= William Crow (MP) =

Irish politician

William Crow was an Irish politician.

Crow was born in Dublin and educated at St John's College, Cambridge.

Crow represented Dublin University from 1698 to 1699.
