= 1865 United Kingdom general election in Ireland =

- 11–24 July 1865

105 of the 658 seats to the House of Commons
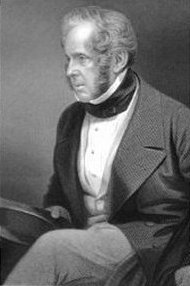

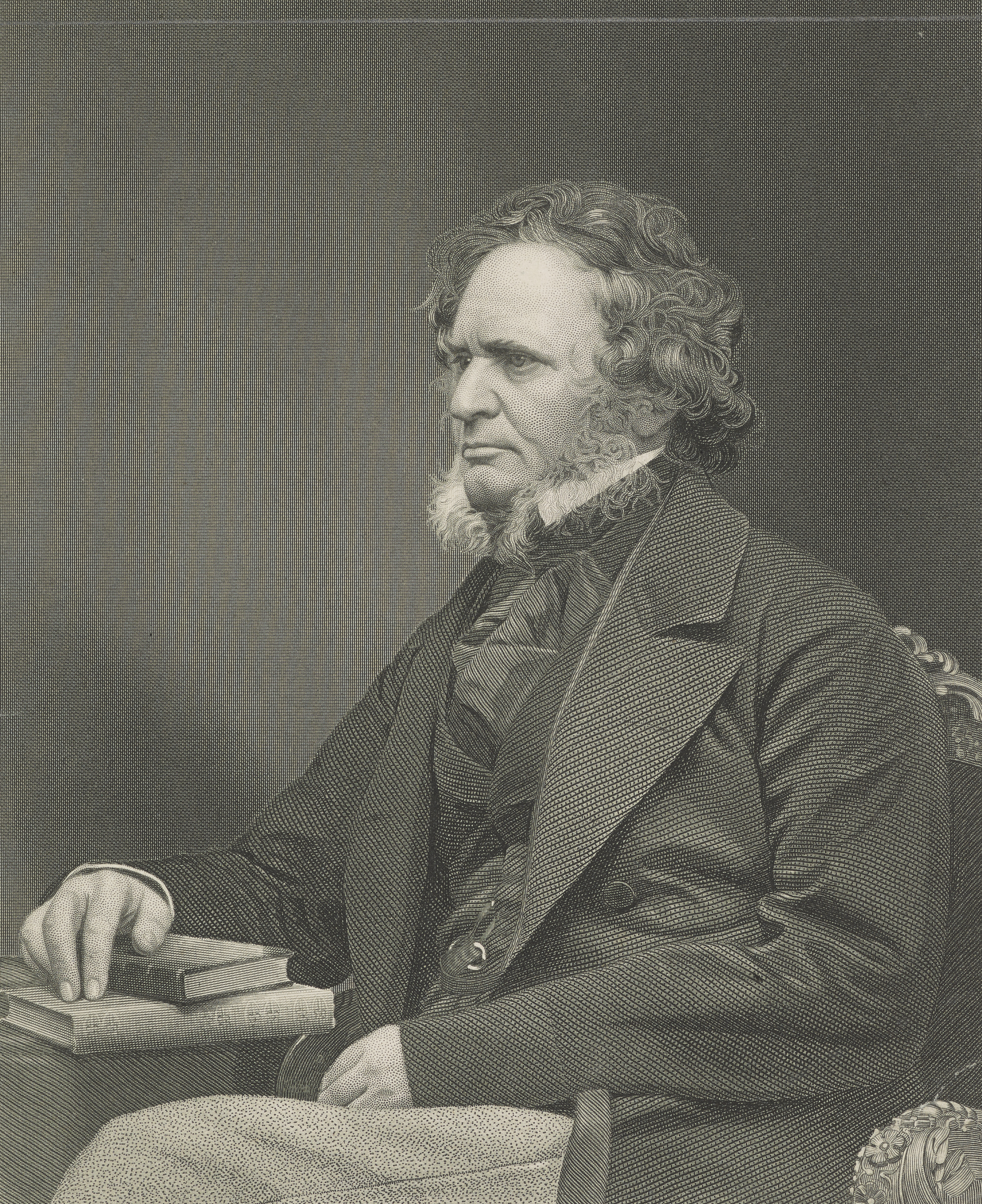
	First party	Second party
Leader	Viscount Palmerston	Earl of Derby
Party	Liberal	Conservative
Leader since	6 February 1855	July 1846
Leader's seat	Tiverton	House of Lords
Seats before	50	55
Seats won	58	47
Seat change	▲8	▼8
Popular vote	51,532	41,497
Percentage	55.6%	44.4%
Swing	▼5.5%	▲5.5%
- Results of the 1865 election in Ireland

The 1865 United Kingdom general election in Ireland took place in July 1865. It was the first election contested by the new Liberal Party. In Ireland, the Liberals increased their seat total. This composed the greater part of the increase of 13 seats for the Liberals led by Viscount Palmerston in the United Kingdom election as a whole, after which they stayed in office. Palmerston died later that year and was succeeded as prime minister by Earl Russell. The number of seats won was: Liberal (58), and Tory (47 including two Dublin University seats).

== Results ==
Party	Candidates	Unopposed	Seats	Seats change	Votes	%	% Change
Liberal	83	28	58	▲8	51,532	55.6	▼5.5
Irish Conservative	61	27	47	▼8	41,497	44.4	▲5.5
Total	142	55	105	—	93,029	100.0	

The vote total does not include the result from Dublin University

Popular vote
Liberal	55.39%
Irish Conservative	44.61%

Parliamentary seats
Liberal	55.24%
Irish Conservative	44.76%

== See also ==
- History of Ireland (1801–1923)
