= James Craig (physician) =

Irish politician (1861–1933)

Sir James Craig

Teachta Dála
- In office May 1921 – 12 July 1933
- Constituency: Dublin University

Personal details
- Born: 16 October 1861 Bushmills, County Antrim, Ireland
- Died: 12 July 1933 (aged 71) Dublin, Ireland
- Party: Independent
- Spouse: Kathleen Millar
- Children: 3
- Education: Trinity College Dublin

Sir James Craig FRCPI (16 October 1861 – 12 July 1933) was an Irish professor of medicine and an independent politician.

Craig was born at Castlecatt, Bushmills, County Antrim. He was educated at the Coleraine Academical Institution and Trinity College Dublin, where he obtained a B.A. and M.B., B.Ch. degrees of the university in 1885. He proceeded M.D. in 1891, and was elected a Fellow of the Royal College of Physicians of Ireland in the same year. He was a physician to Sir Patrick Dun's Hospital and consultant physician to Dr Steevens' Hospital, among others. He was King's Professor of Medicine at Trinity College.

He was elected to the House of Commons of Southern Ireland at the 1921 general election, representing the Dublin University constituency as an independent Unionist. He did not participate in the Second Dáil. He was re-elected as a Teachta Dála for the same constituency at the 1922 general election and became a member of the 3rd Dáil. He was re-elected at the next five general elections, but died in Dublin four months after the 1933 general election, in which he had been returned to the 8th Dáil. He was 71 years old. The by-election for his seat was won by another independent candidate Robert Rowlette.

The Sir James Craig Memorial Prize has been awarded annually in Trinity College since 1952 to the student gaining first place at the final examination in medicine.

Dáil	Election	Deputy (Party)	Deputy (Party)	Deputy (Party)	Deputy (Party)
1st	1918	Arthur Samuels (U)	Robert Woods (Ind U)	2 seats under 1918 Act	
1st	1919 by-election	William Jellett (U)	Robert Woods (Ind U)	2 seats under 1918 Act	
2nd	1921	Ernest Alton (Ind U)	James Craig (Ind U)	William Thrift (Ind U)	Gerald Fitzgibbon (Ind U)
3rd	1922	Ernest Alton (Ind.)	James Craig (Ind.)	William Thrift (Ind.)	Gerald Fitzgibbon (Ind.)
4th	1923	Ernest Alton (Ind.)	James Craig (Ind.)	William Thrift (Ind.)	3 seats from 1923
5th	1927 (Jun)	Ernest Alton (Ind.)	James Craig (Ind.)	William Thrift (Ind.)	3 seats from 1923
6th	1927 (Sep)	Ernest Alton (Ind.)	James Craig (Ind.)	William Thrift (Ind.)	3 seats from 1923
7th	1932	Ernest Alton (Ind.)	James Craig (Ind.)	William Thrift (Ind.)	3 seats from 1923
8th	1933	Ernest Alton (Ind.)	James Craig (Ind.)	William Thrift (Ind.)	3 seats from 1923
8th	1933 by-election	Ernest Alton (Ind.)	Robert Rowlette (Ind.)	William Thrift (Ind.)	3 seats from 1923
