= 1880 United Kingdom general election in Ireland =

- 31 March – 27 April 1880

103 of the 652 seats to the House of Commons
- Turnout: 67.3% (▲3.3 pp)
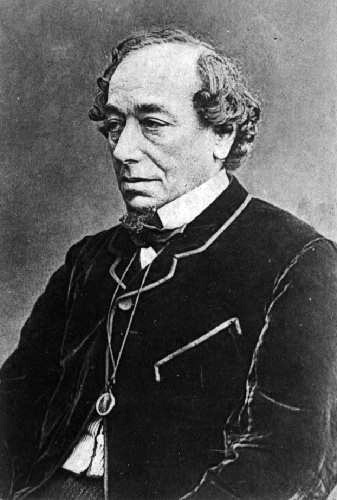

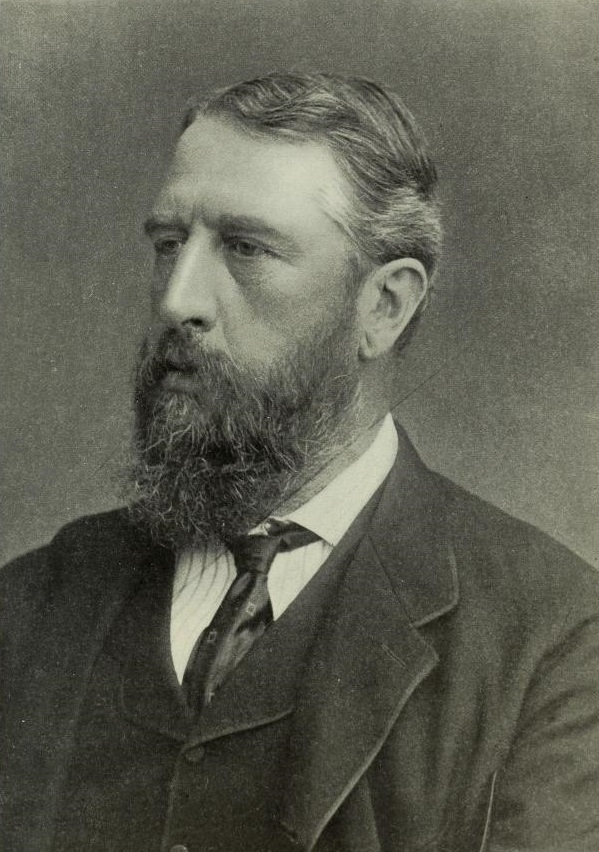
	First party	Second party	Third party
	HRL
Leader	William Shaw	Earl of Beaconsfield	Marquess of Hartington
Party	Home Rule	Conservative	Liberal
Leader since	May 1879	27 February 1868	January 1875
Leader's seat	County Cork	Earl of Beaconsfield	North East Lancashire
Last election	60 seats, 39.6%	33 seats, 40.8%	10 seats, 18.4%
Seats won	63	25	15
Seat change	▲3	▼8	▲5
Popular vote	95,535	99,607	56,252
Percentage	37.5%	39.8%	22.7%
Swing	▼2.1%	▼1.0%	▲4.3%
- Results of the 1880 election in Ireland

The 1880 general election in Ireland marked the beginning both of the dominance of the Irish Parliamentary Party in Irish politics and of Charles Stewart Parnell's dominance within the Party.

The party won 63 of the 103 Irish parliamentary seats. 2 later defected to the Liberals. Parnell was presumed to have had the support of 25 of the MPs. When the Parliamentary Party reassembled in Westminster, Parnell was elected session chairman of the party in place of William Shaw.

The IPP would not drop below the number of seats won in the 1880 election again until the 1918 general election, when it experienced an electoral wipeout at the hands of Sinn Féin.

== Results ==
Party	Seats	Seats change	Votes	%	% Change
Home Rule	63	▲3	95,535	37.5	▼2.1
Irish Conservative	25	▼8	99,607	39.8	▼1.0
Liberal	15	▲5	56,252	22.7	▲4.3
Total	103	—	251,394	100.0	▲3.3

Popular vote
Irish Conservative	39.62%
Home Rule	38.00%
Liberal	22.38%

Parliamentary seats
Home Rule	61.17%
Irish Conservative	24.27%
Liberal	14.56%

== See also ==
- History of Ireland (1801–1923)

== Sources ==
- Craig, F. W. S. (ed.). British Electoral Facts: 1832–1987.
- Walker, Brian M., ed. (1978). Parliamentary Election Results in Ireland, 1801–1922. Royal Irish Academy. pp. 122–127. ISBN 0-901714-12-7.
