= John Edward Walsh =

Irish politician (1816–1869)

John Edward Walsh PC QC (12 November 1816 – 20 October 1869) was an Irish lawyer and Conservative politician. He served as Attorney-General for Ireland in 1866 and as Master of the Rolls in Ireland from 1866 to 1869.

== Background and education ==
Walsh was born at Finglas, County Dublin, where his father, Robert Walsh, was rector. His mother was Anne Bayly. He was educated at Bective College, and matriculated at Trinity College Dublin in July 1832. He was elected a Scholar of the college in 1835, and graduated B.A. in 1836, obtaining a senior moderatorship in ethics and logics and gaining a gold medal. He was a distinguished speaker also at the college Historical Society. Walsh was called to the Irish Bar in 1839, and graduated LL.D. in his University in 1845. He published, in collaboration with Richard Nun, Q.C., a work on The Powers and Duties of Justices of the Peace in Ireland, which was long a standard textbook on this subject. He was a reporter in the Court of Chancery from 1843 to 1852; was appointed Queen's Counsel in 1857, and Crown Prosecutor for Dublin in 1859.

== Political, legal and judicial careers ==
Walsh was Member of Parliament for Dublin University from 1866 to 1867 and served as Attorney-General for Ireland from 25 July to 1 November 1866. He was sworn of the Irish Privy Council on 17 August 1866. he left the House of Commons when he was appointed Master of the Rolls in Ireland in 1866, an office he held until his death.

It seemed probable that a long and distinguished career lay before him, but it was not to be. In the autumn of 1869 he went on a tour to Italy, his health not being very robust. He contracted a fever in the Roman Campagna and died in Paris on his way home on 20 October.

He published, in 1847, Ireland Sixty Years Ago, dealing with Grattan's Parliament and the first quarter of the 19th century, which was published originally as a series of articles in the Dublin University Magazine. It was afterwards re-issued in 1877 as Ireland Ninety Years Ago.

== Family ==
He married Blair Belinda MacNeill, daughter of Captain Gordon MacNeill of Dublin, in 1841. They had five sons and a daughter. His eldest son Robert Walsh was Archdeacon of Dublin from 1909 until 1917. Another son, Henry Deane Walsh, emigrated to Australia, where he became one of the foremost engineers of his time, and did much to improve Sydney Harbour.

== Arms ==
Coat of arms of John Edward Walsh
Notes Confirmed by John Bernard Burke, Ulster King of Arms, 21 October 1866. Crest Out of a ducal coronet Or a demi lion Azure charged on the shoulder with a bezant. Escutcheon Azure a lion rampant Argent over all a fess per pale of the second and Gules a canton Or. Motto Noli Irritare Leonem

Parliament of the United Kingdom
Preceded by James Whiteside and Anthony Lefroy	Member of Parliament for Dublin University; 1866; With: Anthony Lefroy	Succeeded by Hedges Eyre Chatterton and Anthony Lefroy
Legal offices
Preceded by James Anthony Lawson	Attorney-General for Ireland; July–November 1866	Succeeded by Michael Morris
Preceded by Thomas Cusack-Smith	Master of the Rolls in Ireland; 1866–1869	Succeeded by Edward Sullivan
