= Tom Clonan =

Irish politician, academic and former Army officer

Senator Tom Clonan
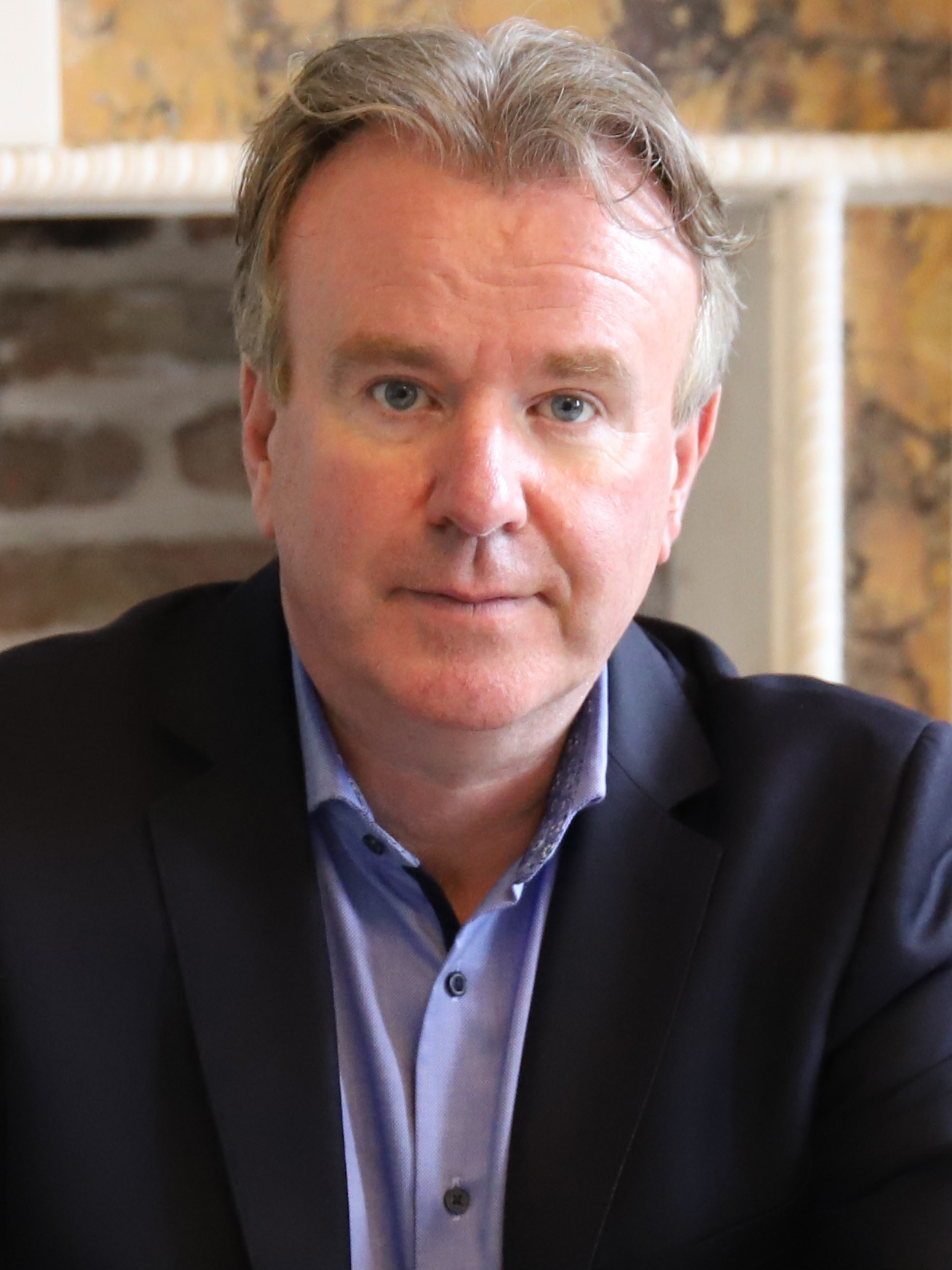
- Clonan in 2022

Senator
- Incumbent
- Assumed office 5 April 2022
- Constituency: Dublin University

Personal details
- Born: 1965/1966 (age 59–60) Dublin, Ireland
- Party: Independent
- Education: Trinity College Dublin; Dublin City University
- Profession: Journalist; Academic; Politician
- Website: tomclonan.ie

Military service
- Allegiance: Ireland
- Branch/service: Army
- Years of service: 1989–2000
- Rank: Captain
- Battles/wars: UNIFIL

Thomas Martin Clonan (born 1965/1966) is an Irish senator, security analyst, author and retired Irish Army Captain. He was elected to Seanad Éireann at the 2022 Dublin University by-election. He was re-elected at the 2025 Seanad election.

== Military career ==
Clonan grew up in Finglas, Dublin and attended St Kevin's College, Dublin school in Ballygall. He completed a Bachelor in Education degree at Trinity College Dublin, graduating in 1987, before joining the Irish Army as a cadet in 1989.

In 1995, Clonan deployed to South Lebanon as an officer commanding Irish troops under the United Nations Interim Force in Lebanon (UNIFIL) mission in that country. Clonan's deployment to Lebanon coincided with the Israeli Operation Grapes of Wrath against Hezbollah which culminated in the massacre of refugees at the village of Qana in April 1996. Clonan has spoken about his experiences of conflict and trauma in the RTÉ documentary Peacekeepers (2016) and in his first book Blood, Sweat and Tears. He was also an OSCE election monitor in Bosnia during the Dayton Agreement in 1996. In this role, Clonan was based in the Serb-held town of Prijedor. Back at home, he completed a master's degree in communications at the Dublin City University (DCU) and joined the Defence Forces Press Office (DFPO) as a press officer.

=== Research on female personnel in the Defence Forces ===
Between 1996 and 2000 Clonan was given formal written sanction by the Chief of Staff and the Director of Training at Defence Forces Headquarters to undertake a PhD at DCU as the first equality audit of the Irish military, titled "The Status and Roles Assigned Female Personnel in the Permanent Defence Forces". The findings revealed a catalogue of discrimination, bullying, sexual harassment and assault within the Irish Defence Forces against female soldiers and led to an independent government inquiry which resulted in an overhaul in the workplace policies of the Defence Forces and the implementation of recommendations arising from the inquiry to protect equality within the Irish armed forces. Clonan was the subject of 'Whistleblower Reprisal' (as cited by Transparency International, Ireland) from senior officers for whistleblowing.

He retired from the Defence Forces in 2000.

== Academic and media work ==
Clonan lectures at the Technological University Dublin (TUD) School of Media in the fields of Ethics, Journalism, Political Communication, Public Affairs and Research Methodology.

He was a security analyst for The Irish Times from the September 11 attacks in 2001 to 2016, reporting and commenting on various world events involving defence, intelligence, terrorism and international relations for various news organisations. He is currently a security analyst and columnist for Irish online news platform, TheJournal.ie (2016 to date).

He is a Fellow of the US-based Armed Forces & Society publication.

Clonan's young son suffers from a rare neuromuscular disease, and as a result Clonan has campaigned on behalf of children and young people in Ireland with disabilities and brought attention to the effects austerity has had on funding for essential services to assist people with disabilities.

He is the author of two best-selling books, Blood, Sweat and Tears (2012) and Whistleblower, Soldier, Spy (2013).

In November 2019, Clonan was recognised by the Irish military authorities for his PhD research which helped transform the culture of the Irish Armed Forces with regard to Equality, Diversity and Dignity in the Workplace. Clonan was formally acknowledged and thanked for his service and contribution to the Defence Forces by the Chief of Staff, Vice Admiral Mark Mellett at the Military College, Curragh Camp in November 2019.

== Political career ==
Clonan ran for election to the 25th Seanad in 2016 for the Dublin University constituency, but was unsuccessful. Clonan ran again in 2020, increasing his vote but the incumbent senators retained their seats. He stood again at the 2022 Dublin University by-election, beating Maureen Gaffney on the sixteenth count. He was re-elected in February 2025.

== Political views ==
In 2025 Clonan argued that Irish neutrality should remain a core principle, but it is often misunderstood. He emphasised that Ireland has always followed a policy of military non-alignment, meaning it is not part of any formal military alliance like NATO, but has historically cooperated with Western powers when necessary. While advocating for the preservation of neutrality, Clonan stressed the importance of enhancing Ireland's defence capabilities, and argued that the country’s Defence Forces are severely underfunded and under-resourced. He believes that in the face of changing global security dynamics, Ireland must adapt by investing in its military to maintain its neutrality while ensuring its own security.

Clonan is opposed to changes to Ireland's "triple lock", a statutory mechanism governing certain overseas deployments of the Defence Forces. It generally requires Government approval, Dáil approval for deployments of more than twelve personnel, and a United Nations basis, which may come through either the UN Security Council or the UN General Assembly.

== Works ==
- Clonan, Tom (2012). Blood, Sweat and Tears: An Irish Soldier's Story of Love and Loss. Dublin: Liberties Press. ISBN 978-1907593550.
