= Rosaleen McDonagh =

Writer

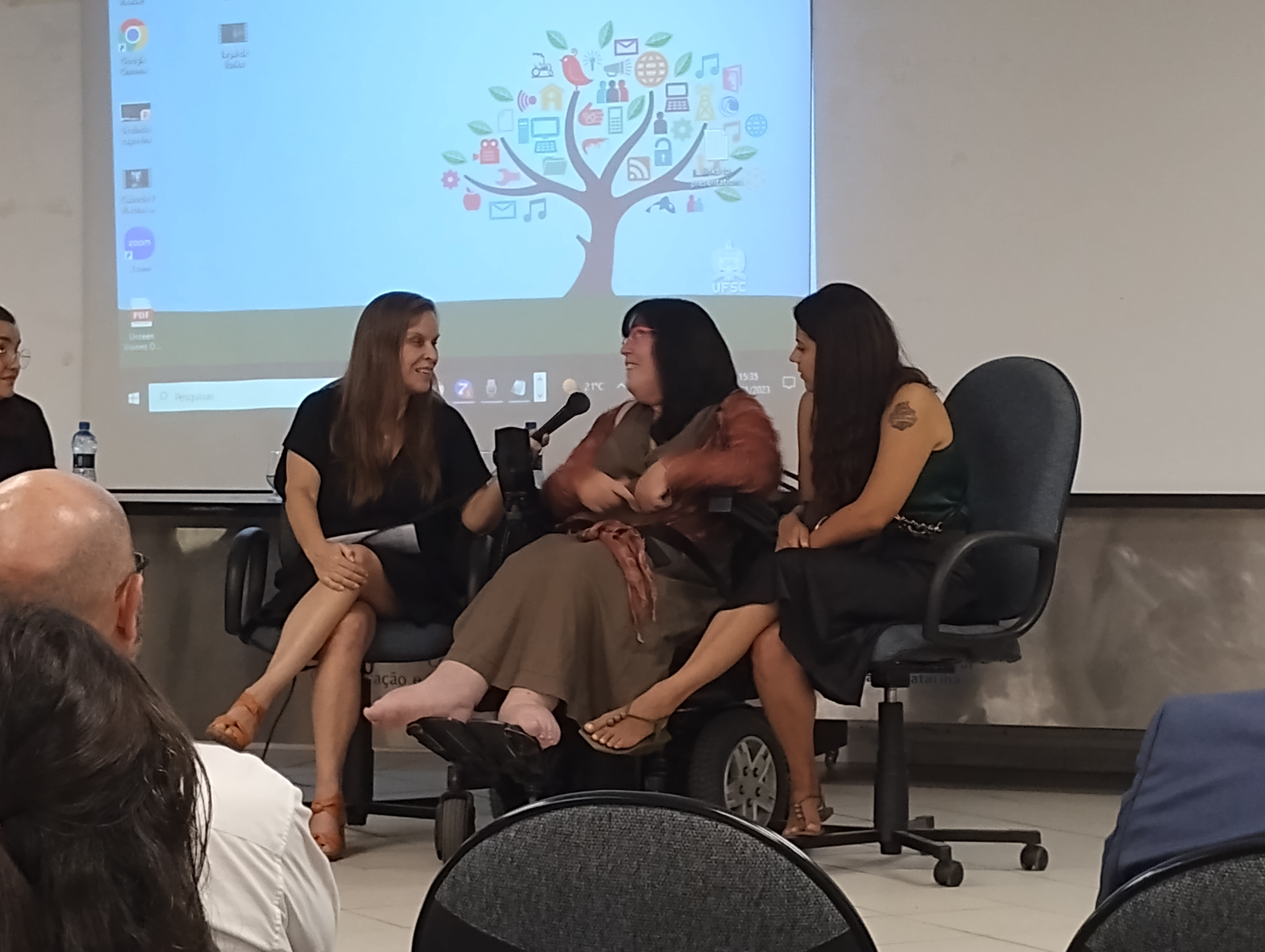
- Born: Sligo, Ireland
- Education: Trinity College Dublin
- Known for: playwright, activist

Rosaleen McDonagh is an Irish Traveller activist, playwright, and author.

== Early life ==
McDonagh was born in Sligo and is the fourth of twenty children. She was born with cerebral palsy. She spent ten years working in the Pavee Point Traveller and Roma Centre in the Violence against women programme. McDonagh got a BA in Biblical and Theological Studies. She then went on to complete an MPhil in Ethnic and Racial Studies, and an MPhil in Creative Writing, all from Trinity College Dublin. In December 2019 she was awarded a PhD from Northumbria University.

== Career ==
McDonagh has been an activist for the Irish Travellers community. She writes for The Irish Times as well as having written a number of plays focusing typically on the feminist Traveller perspective. One of her plays, Rings, was performed at VAS in Washington in June 2010. Another was shortlisted for the PJ O’ Connor radio play Awards in 2010. Colum McCann chose her to adapt his novel Zoli for stage. McDonagh has had work commissioned by RTE. McDonagh has worked with theatre groups like Fishamble and Graeae Theatre. She had a play directed by the Olivier award winner, Jim Culleton. She is a member of Aosdána, the first from the Traveller community.

McDonagh was also the first Traveller to run for election to the Seanad standing in 2002 and 2007, although she was not successful. She has addressed a Dáil committee on assisted dying.
