= 1859 United Kingdom general election in Ireland =

- 28 April – 18 May 1859

105 of the 670 seats to the House of Commons
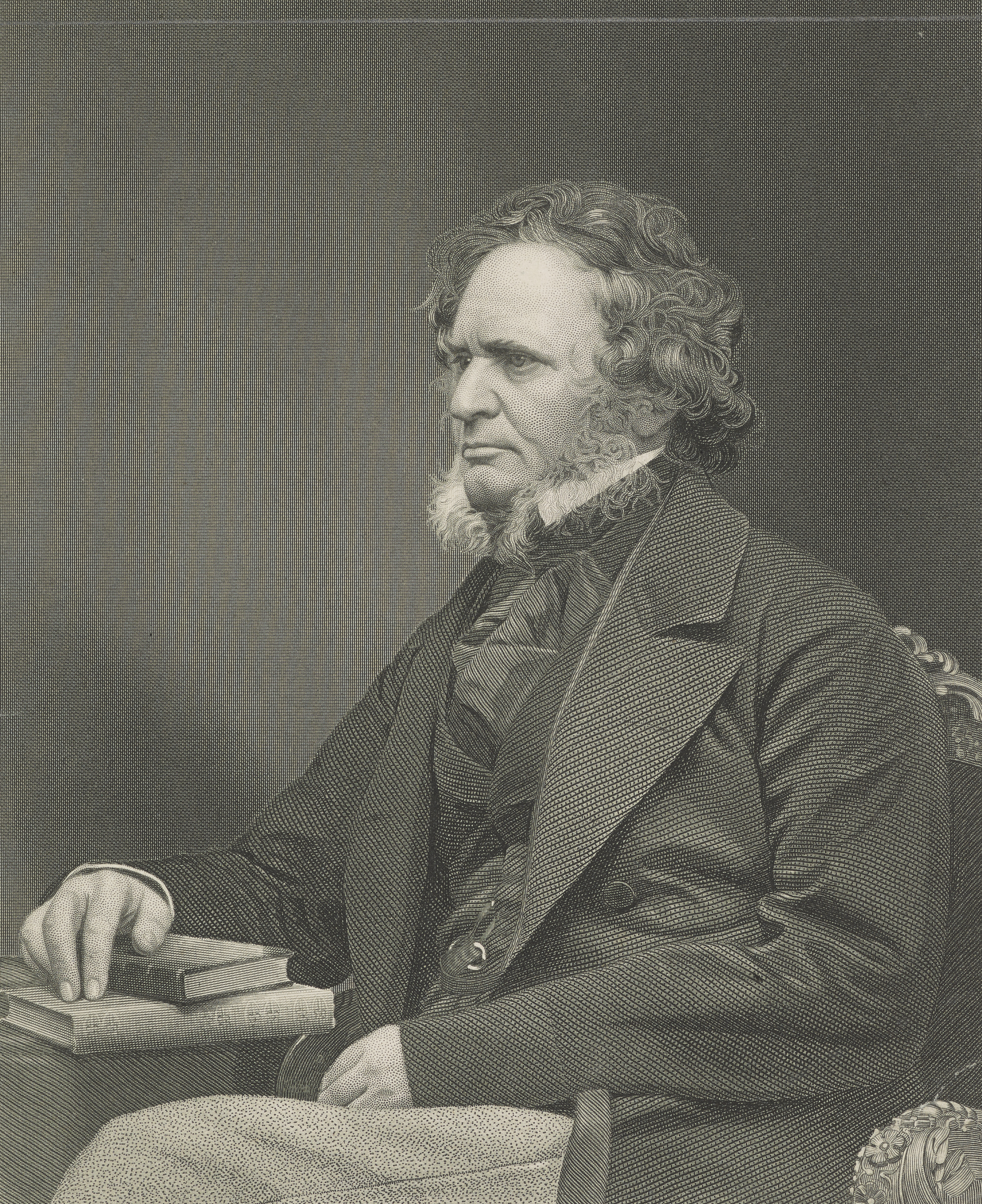

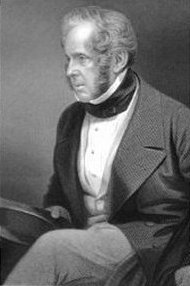
	First party	Second party
Leader	Earl of Derby	Viscount Palmerston
Party	Conservative	Whig
Leader since	July 1846	6 February 1855
Leader's seat	House of Lords	Tiverton
Seats before	42	48
Seats won	55	50
Seat change	▲11	▲2
Popular vote	35,258	57,409
Percentage	38.9%	61.1%
Swing	▼4.7%	▲13.3%
- Results of the 1859 election in Ireland

The 1859 United Kingdom general election in Ireland produced the last overall victory for the Conservatives in Ireland. They won a majority of seats on the island despite the Liberals receiving over 60% of the vote; this was partly due to a disproportionately large number of Conservative candidates standing unopposed. The franchise was restricted to the middle and upper classes.

Electoral reform in subsequent decades saw something of a rise in the Tory vote in Ireland accompanied by a diminution in the number of seats the party won. This was again due in some degree to the relative numbers of candidates standing unopposed for the two parties.

== Results ==
1859 general election in Ireland
Party	Candidates	Unopposed	Seats	Seats change	Votes	%	% Change
Irish Conservative	67	36	55	▲11	35,258	38.9	▼4.7
Whig	73	26	50	▲2	57,409	61.1	▲13.3
Total	140	62	105	Steady	92,667	100.0	

Popular vote
Whigs	61.95%
Irish Conservative	38.05%

Parliamentary seats
Irish Conservative	52.38%
Whigs	47.62%

== See also ==
- History of Ireland (1801–1923)
