= 1870 Dublin University by-election =

UK Parliamentary by-election

The 1870 Dublin University by-election was fought on 14 February 1870 in the Dublin University constituency. The by-election was fought due to the resignation of the incumbent Conservative MP Anthony Lefroy. It was won by the unopposed Conservative candidate David Robert Plunket.
