= Hedges Eyre Chatterton =

Irish Conservative Party Member of Parliament

Solicitor General for Ireland
- In office 1866–1867
- Preceded by: Michael Morris
- Succeeded by: Robert Warren

Member of Parliament for Dublin University
- In office 1867–1867 Serving with Anthony Lefroy
- Preceded by: John Edward Walsh; Anthony Lefroy
- Succeeded by: Robert Warren; Anthony Lefroy

Attorney-General for Ireland
- In office 1867–1867
- Preceded by: Michael Morris
- Succeeded by: Robert Warren

Personal details
- Born: 5 July 1819; Cork, Ireland
- Died: 30 August 1910 (aged 91)
- Political party: Conservative

Hedges Eyre Chatterton (5 July 1819 – 30 August 1910) was an Irish Conservative Party Member of Parliament (MP) in the United Kingdom Parliament and subsequently Vice-Chancellor of Ireland.

== Biography ==
He was born in Cork, the eldest son of Abraham Chatterton, a solicitor, and Jane Tisdall of Kenmare. He attended Trinity College Dublin, before being called to the Irish Bar in 1843. He became a Queen's Counsel (QC) in 1858. Chatterton was Solicitor General for Ireland 1866–1867 and Attorney General for Ireland in 1867. He was made a member of the Privy Council of Ireland on 30 March 1867. He was elected MP for Dublin University in 1867. Chatterton left the House of Commons on his appointment to the newly created judicial office of Vice-Chancellor of Ireland in 1867, an office which was abolished when he retired in 1904.

He married firstly Mary Halloran of Cloyne in 1845; she died in 1901. In the year of his retirement, he remarried Florence Henrietta Gore, widow of Edward Croker. He had no children. James Joyce remarks in Ulysses that his second marriage at the age of 85 infuriated his nephew, who had been waiting patiently for years to inherit his money.

== Reputation ==
Despite his many years of service on the Bench, Chatterton does not seem to have been highly regarded as a judge. On his retirement the Bar paid tribute to his good qualities but added several qualifications: "there might have been on the Bench lawyers more profound, reasoners more acute..." In his first decade on the Bench he had to endure the continual denigration of Jonathan Christian, the Lord Justice of Appeal in Chancery. Christian was notoriously bitter-tongued, and while he despised most of his colleagues, he seems to have had a particular dislike of Chatterton. He regularly voted on appeal to overturn his judgments, and frequently added personal insults. Nor did he confine his attacks to the courtroom: there was controversy in 1870 when remarks of Christian that Chatterton was "lazy, stupid, conceited and so incompetent that he ought to be pensioned off" found their way into the Irish Times. The hint about pensioning off Chatterton was not taken up, no doubt because he enjoyed the confidence of the Lord Chancellor of Ireland, Thomas O'Hagan, 1st Baron O'Hagan, who was also on bad terms with Christian. In an appeal from Chatterton in 1873 the two appeal judges clashed publicly, with O'Hagan reprimanding Christian for insulting a judge who was not there to defend himself.

== Renaming Sackville Street ==
Chatterton became involved in controversy in 1885, over the first attempt to rename Sackville Street as O'Connell Street. Dublin Corporation voted for the name change, but it aroused considerable objections from local residents, one of whom sought an injunction. Chatterton granted the injunction on the ground that the corporation had exceeded its statutory powers; rather unwisely, he also attacked the merits of the decision, accusing the Corporation of "sentimental notions". The corporation was angered by both the decision and the criticisms: while it may have been a coincidence, the fact that Temple Street was briefly renamed Chatterton Street was interpreted by some as an insult to the judge, since the street was much frequented by prostitutes. The controversy was short-lived: the corporation was granted the necessary statutory powers in 1890, and the new name became official in 1924, by which time it had gained popular acceptance.

Parliament of the United Kingdom
Preceded by John Edward Walsh and Anthony Lefroy	Member of Parliament for Dublin University; 1867; With: Anthony Lefroy	Succeeded by Robert Warren and Anthony Lefroy
Political offices
Preceded by Michael Morris	Solicitor General for Ireland; 1866–1867	Succeeded by Robert Warren
Preceded by Michael Morris	Attorney-General for Ireland; 1867	Succeeded by Robert Warren
