= 1885 United Kingdom general election in Ireland =

- 24 November – 18 December 1885

103 seats for Ireland of the 670 seats in the House of Commons
- Turnout: 75.0% (▲7.7 pp)
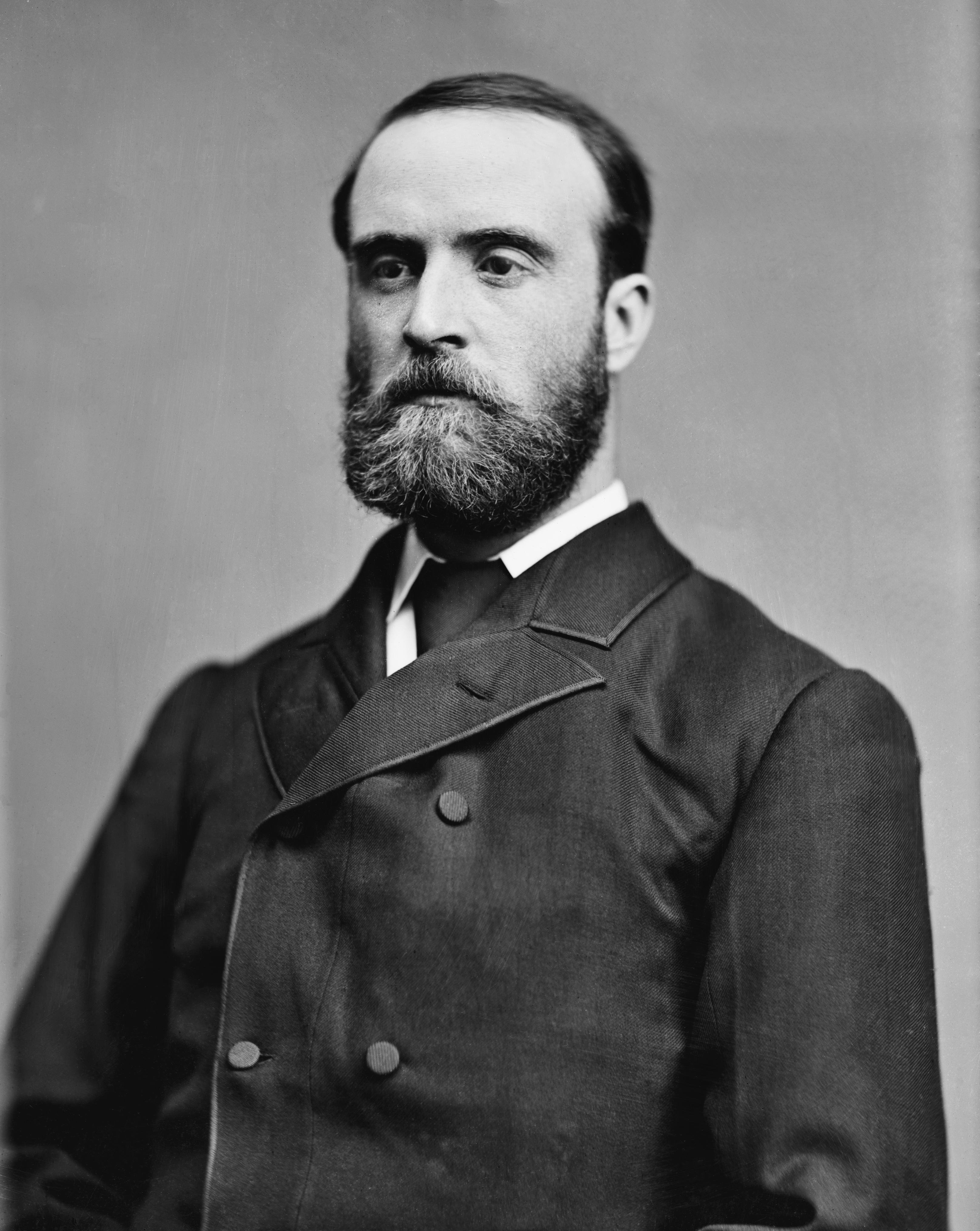

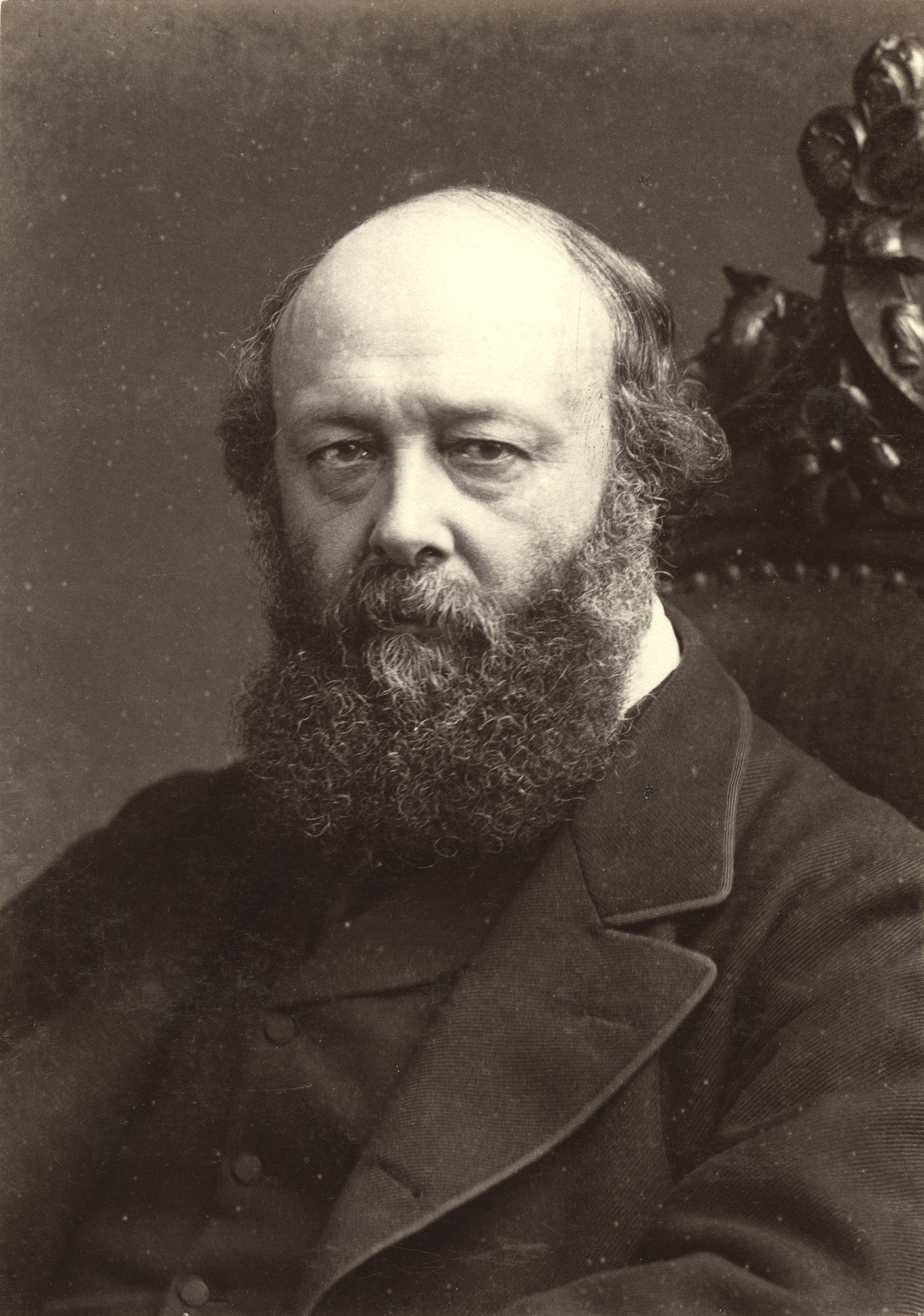

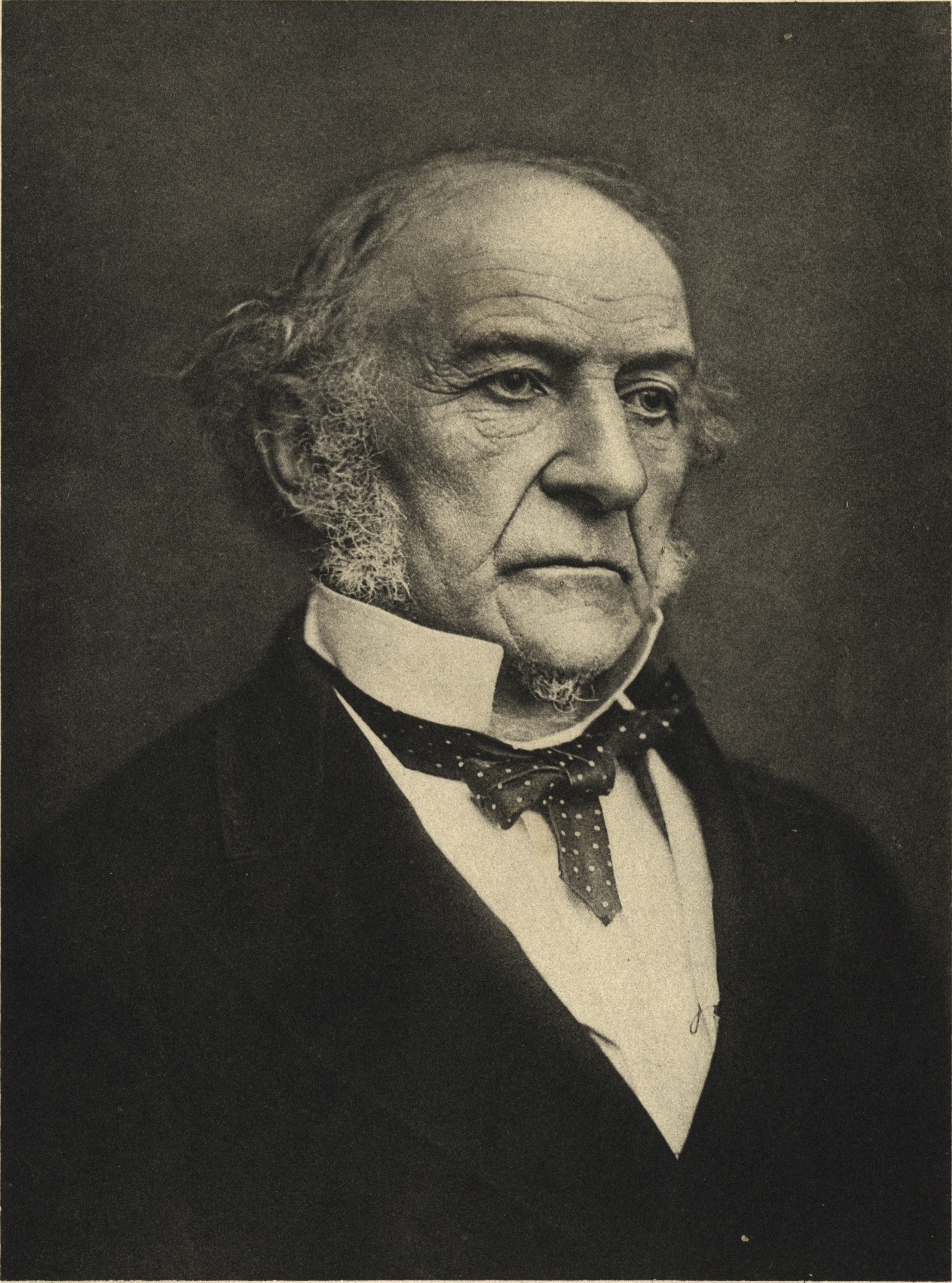
	First party	Second party	Third party
Leader	Charles Stewart Parnell	Marquess of Salisbury	William Ewart Gladstone
Party	Irish Parliamentary	Conservative	Liberal
Leader since	17 October 1882	April 1881	April 1880
Leader's seat	Cork City	House of Lords	Midlothian
Last election	63 seats, 37.5%	25 seats, 39.8%	15 seats, 22.7%
Seats won	85	16	0
Seat change	▲22	▼9	▼15
Popular vote	307,119	111,503	30,022
Percentage	66.9%	23.1%	6.7%
Swing	▲29.4%	▼16.7%	▼16.0%
- Results of the 1885 election in Ireland

From 24 November to 18 December 1885, the 1885 United Kingdom general election was held in Ireland, to elect all 670 members of the House of Commons. This was the first election following the Representation of the People Act 1884 and the Redistribution of Seats Act 1885, which redrew the Irish electoral landscape. Of the 670 seats in the House of Commons, 103 were in Ireland; 101 represented 100 county and borough territorial constituencies, with 2 seats representing Cork City; and two additional seats represented the Dublin University wherein only graduates of the university could vote. All county and borough seats were contest via first-past-the-post voting, with Dublin University being contested under Plurality block voting.

The election came about due to the resignation of the Liberal Government and its request for a dissolution after a defeat in the House of Commons on an amendment to the Finance Bill by the Liberal Party. The Marquess of Salisbury then formed a minority Conservative Government, but within five months he requested a dissolution. As a result of the election nationally, the Liberal Party were returned with the greatest number of seats, but short of an overall majority in its own right.

The election saw the Irish Parliamentary Party secure their place as the dominant party in Irish politics, winning the vast majority of available seats. In comparison, the Liberals were wiped out in Ireland, whilst the Conservatives were reduced to 18 seats, all in Ulster or the Dublin University.

== Changes to the Irish Electorate ==
The Irish electorate in 1885 was radically different to that in 1880. The Representation of the People Act 1884 equalised the county and borough franchises and made all householders and lodgers in the counties eligible to vote, thereby bringing Irish electoral law into line with that in Great Britain. The result of this reform saw the Irish electorate more than triple, increasing from 229,204 in 1880 to 737,965 in 1885. However, the Irish electorate was still comparatively smaller than the electorates of the other nations of the United Kingdom; whilst 2 in 3 adults men had the vote in England and Wales, or 3 in 5 in Scotland, in Ireland only 1 in 2 adult men could vote.

It was also the first election following the passing of the Corrupt and Illegal Practices Prevention Act 1883. This Act criminalised attempts to bribe voters and standardised the amount that could be spent on election expenses.

== Candidates ==
Below is a table summarising the candidates of the 1885 general election in Ireland, excluding those who stood in the University constituency of Dublin University.

Affiliation	Candidates
Irish Parliamentary Party	90
Irish Conservative Party	65
Liberal Party	17
Irish Loyal and Patriotic Union	6
Independent	4 (Note: The candidates that stood were Alexander Bowman in Belfast North, Henry Villiers-Stuart in East Cork, John Pinkerton in North Antrim and Thomas Walsh in North Cork.)
Independent Conservative	3 (Note: The candidates that stood were Edward de Cobain in Belfast East, and William Johnston and Robert Seeds in Belfast South.)
Independent Nationalist	1 (Note: Candidate Philip Callan stood in North Louth.)
Total	186

== Analysis ==
The election saw the Irish Parliamentary Party secure their place as the dominant party in Irish politics, winning the vast majority of available seats. In comparison, the Liberals were wiped out in Ireland, whilst the Conservatives were reduced to 16 seats, all in Ulster or the Dublin University. However, 2 Independent Conservative candidates won seats. These were Edward de Cobain in Belfast East and William Johnston in Belfast South. Each were supported by the Conservative Party, and would join the party before the next election, standing as its official candidates.

The election also saw the emergence of the Irish Loyal and Patriotic Union; one of the forerunners of the later Irish Unionist Alliance. The IPLU sought to maximise the number of candidates elected from unionist parties in the three southern Irish provinces. In doing this the party would support individual candidates in various constituencies, and encourage Irish unionists to vote for these candidates, instead of splitting their vote between the various parties. Despite the IPLU's attempts, no southern Unionists were elected.

The election also saw a similarly named Loyal Irish Union, which campaigned alongside Irish Conservatives. Unlike the ILPU, which prioritised Unionism over party politics, the Loyal Irish Union prioritised opposition to the Liberals over forming any kind of bi-partisan Unionist alliance.

== County and borough results ==
Party	Leader	Seats					Aggregate votes		
Party	Leader	Total	Gains	Losses	Net	Of total (%)	Total	Of total (%) (Note: Adjusted for multi-member constituencies.)	Change (%)
Irish Parliamentary	Charles Stewart Parnell	85	—N/a		▲24	84.2	303,753	66.9	▲29.4
Irish Conservative	Lord; Salisbury	14	—N/a		▼7	13.9	103,323	23.1	▼16.7
Liberal	William Ewart; Gladstone	0	—N/a		▼15	—	29,943	6.7	▼16.0
Independent Conservative	—N/a	2	Did not stand in 1880		▲2	2.0	7,514	1.7	—N/a
Independent	—N/a	0	Did not stand in 1880			—	3,613	0.8	—N/a
Irish Loyal and Patriotic	—N/a	0	New			—	1,869	0.4	New
Independent Nationalist	—N/a	0	Did not stand in 1880			—	1,451	0.3	—N/a
Total		101			0	100.0	451,466	100.0	0.0
Registered voters, and turnout							591,504 (Note: Electorate in contested constituencies. The total electorate was 737,965.)	75.0	▲7.7

Popular vote
IPP	66.9%
Conservative	23.1%
Liberal	6.7%
Ind. Conservative	1.7%
Independent	0.8%
Irish Loyalist	0.4%
Ind. Nationalist	0.3%

Parliamentary seats
IPP	84.2%
Conservative	13.9%
Ind. Conservative	2.0%

== Dublin University constituency result ==
1885 general election: Dublin University (2 seats)
Party	Candidate	Votes	%	±%
Irish Conservative	David Plunket	Unopposed		
Irish Conservative	Hugh Holmes	Unopposed		
Registered electors		4,155		
Irish Conservative hold				
Irish Conservative hold				

== See also ==
- 1885 United Kingdom general election in England
- 1885 United Kingdom general election in Scotland
- 1885 United Kingdom general election in Wales
- List of United Kingdom Parliament constituencies (1885–1918) by region

== Sources ==
- Walker, Brian. "The 1885 and 1886 general elections in Ireland". History Ireland.
