= 1885 United Kingdom general election in Scotland =

- 24 Nov. – 18 Dec. 1885

All 72 Scottish seats to the House of Commons
- Turnout: 82.0% (▲2.0 pp)
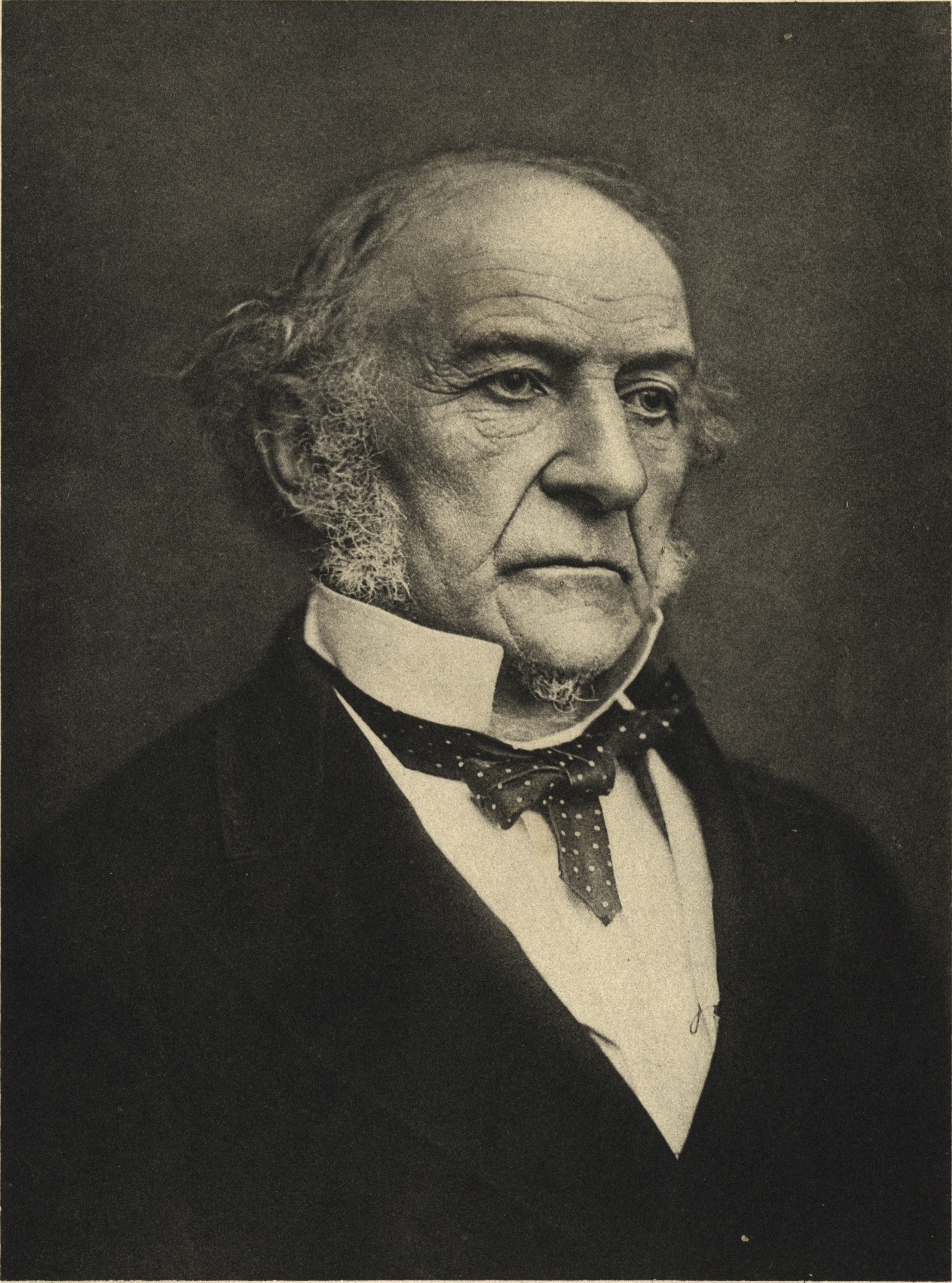

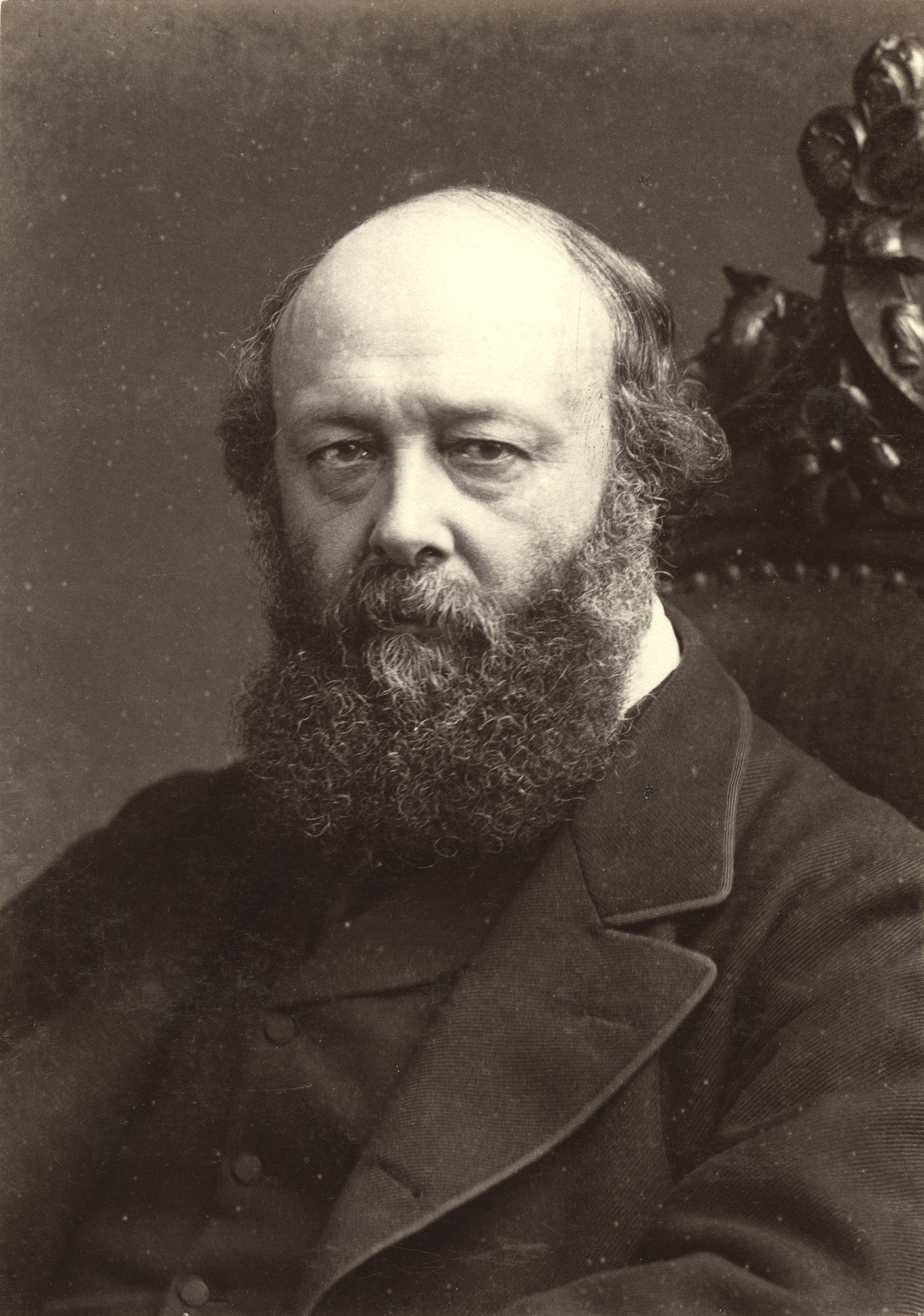

	First party	Second party	Third party
Leader	William Ewart Gladstone	Marquess of Salisbury	Gavin Brown Clark
Party	Liberal	Conservative	Crofters Party
Leader since	April 1880	April 1881
Leader's seat	Midlothian	House of Lords	Caithness
Last election	53 seats, (Note: Combined results for burgh, county and university seats) 70.1%	7 seats, 29.9%	Did not contest
Seats won	51	10	4
Seat change	▼2	▲3	▲4
Popular vote	238,627 (Note: Total and percentage votes given here are for territorial constituencies only)	151,137	16,551
Percentage	53.3%	34.3%	3.7%
Swing	▼16.8%	▲4.4%	New party

From 24 November to 18 December 1885, the 1885 United Kingdom general election was held in Scotland, to elect all 670 members of the House of Commons, with 72 seats being in Scotland. Scotland was allocated 70 territorial seats, comprising 32 burgh constituencies and 37 county constituencies, (Note: One burgh seat, Dundee, was represented by two members of parliament.) and two university constituencies, Glasgow and Aberdeen Universities and Edinburgh and St Andrews Universities.

The election came about due to the resignation of the Liberal Government and request for a dissolution after a defeat in the House of Commons on an amendment to the Finance Bill by the Liberal Party. The Marquess of Salisbury formed subsequently a minority Conservative Government but within five months he requested a dissolution. As a result of the election nationally, the Liberal Party were returned with the greatest number of seats, but short of an overall majority in its own right.

== Electoral system ==
All constituencies contested under the first past the post electoral system. It was the first general election to be held after enactment of the Representation of the People Act 1884, known also as the Third Reform Act. This was also accompanied with the Redistribution of Seats Act 1885. The former Act brought about an extension of the franchise and voting rights which had already existed in towns to rural areas of the United Kingdom, and together with the latter Act, brought about the general use of single-member constituencies under first-past-the-post voting and increased the general distribution of more rural constituencies amongst the counties.

As part of the general re-distribution, Scotland had gained 12 seats since the previous election as a result of the Redistribution of Seats Act 1885, and the electorate had increased from 293,581 to 560,580 (out of 3,735,573 people registered as living in Scotland in the 1881 census) as a result of the Representation of the People Act 1884. This arrangement would last until 1918.

It was also the first election following the passing of the Corrupt and Illegal Practices Prevention Act 1883. This Act criminalised attempts to bribe voters and standardised the amount that could be spent on election expenses.

== Candidates ==
Below is a table summarising the candidates of the 1885 general election in Scotland, excluding those in the university constituencies.

Affiliation	Candidates
Scottish Liberal Party	70 (Note: Includes Liberal-Labour candidates Bennet Burleigh in Glasgow Govan, John Malcolm Inglis in Kirkcaldy Burghs and Cunninghame Graham in North West Lanarkshire.)
Conservative Party	55
Independent Liberal	17
Crofters Party	6 (Note: The candidates that stood were Donald Horne Macfarlane in Argyllshire, Gavin Brown Clark in Caithness, Roderick Macdonald in Ross and Cromarty, Walter McLaren in Inverness Burghs, Charles Fraser-Mackintosh in Inverness-shire, and Angus Sutherland in Sutherland .)
Scottish Land Restoration League	5 (Note: The candidates that stood were James Shaw Maxwell in Glasgow Blackfriars and Hutchesontown, William Forsyth in Glasgow Bridgeton, Wallace McGuffin Greaves in Glasgow Tradeston, John Morrison Davidson in Greenock, and John Murdoch in Partick.)
Independent Conservative	1 (Note: Candidate John Steven Storr stood in Kilmarnock Burghs.)
Wick Radical Workingmen's Association	1 (Note: Candidate John Macdonald Cameron stood in Wick Burghs.)
Scottish Farmers' Alliance	1 (Note: Candidate Quintin Kerr stood in West Aberdeenshire.)
Hamilton Liberal Association	1 (Note: Candidate James Galloway Weir stood in Falkirk Burghs.)
Total	157

== Analysis ==
=== Liberal Party and independents ===
Of particular note was the splintering of the Liberal representation in Scotland. Some 7 MPs were returned as Independent Liberals, with Edinburgh in particular seeing 3 of its 4 constituencies return Independent Liberals. Amongst those in Edinburgh were John Wilson in Edinburgh Central, George Goschen in Edinburgh East, and George Harrison in Edinburgh South. Wilson and Goschen would go on to instead stand as candidates for the Liberal Unionist Party when it had formed prior to the election in 1886.

Charles Stuart Parker in Perth, George Campbell in Kirkcaldy Burghs, with Sir Robert Anstruther winning the seat of St Andrews Burghs by only 2 votes. All winning Liberal candidates, except Anstruther who would retire from Parliament in 1886, would go on to stand as official candidates for Liberal Party at the next election. This number included John Macdonald Cameron in Wick Burghs, under the specific sponsorship of the Wick Radical Workingman's Association. Cameron would run again in the following year as an official Liberal candidate.

=== Crofters Party ===
In the western Highlands the Crofters Party emerged as the dominant force, taking four constituencies. The Independent Liberal MP elected for the Wick Burghs also aligned with the group. The emergence of the group was owed to the Representation of the People Act 1884, which had reduced the property qualifications for voters. As a result many crofters were able to vote for the first time in 1885. The Crofting Party worked in close collaboration with the Highland Land League, and opposed the lack of secure and tenure and the severely reduced access to land for crofters.

In terms of seat, the Crofters Party returned 4 seats in Scotland out of the 6 candidates which stood amongst the highland constituencies. These were Donald Horne Macfarlane in Argyllshire, Gavin Brown Clark in Caithness, Roderick Macdonald in Ross and Cromarty, and Walter McLaren in Inverness Burghs. The group would, however, stand again in the following election but as supportive of the Liberal Party and unopposed by the party. This was true for of such MPs apart from Fraser-Mackintosh in Inverness-shire, who would go on to join the splitting party from the Liberal Party, the Liberal Unionist Party in the 1886 general election.

The other of such candidates ––Walter McLaren in Inverness Burghs and Angus Sutherland in Sutherland–– were unsuccessful. Nonetheless, McLaren would go onto be elected in 1886 in Crewe in England, with Sutherland being elected in the constituency of Sutherland in 1886.

== Seats summary ==
Below is a table summarising the total number of seats, gains and losses for each party in both the territorial county and burgh constituencies and the university constituencies.

Party	Seats				
Party	Total	Gains	Losses	Net	Of all (%)
Liberal	51	—N/a (Note: Difficult to calculate due to significant boundary changes.)		▼2	70.8
Conservative	10	—N/a		▲3	13.9
Independent Liberal	6	Did not stand in 1880		▲6	8.3
Crofters	4	New		▲4	5.6
Wick Radical Workingmen's	1	New		▲1	1.4
Total	72			▲12	

== County and burgh constituencies ==
Below is a table summarising the constituency results of the 1885 general election in Scotland, excluding the result in the university constituencies.

Party	Seats					Aggregate votes		
Party	Total	Gains	Losses	Net	Of total (%)	Total	Of total (%) (Note: Adjusted for multi-member constituencies.)	Change (%)
Liberal	51	—N/a (Note: Difficult to calculate due to significant boundary changes.)		▼1	72.9	238,627	53.3	▼16.8
Conservative	8	—N/a		▲2	11.4	151,137	34.3	▲4.4
Independent Liberal	6	Did not stand in 1880		▲6	8.6	35,702	8.0	—N/a
Crofters	4	New		▲4	5.7	16,551	3.7	New
Scottish Land Restoration	0	New			—	2,359	0.5	New
Scottish Farmers' Alliance	0	New			—	1,530	0.3	New
Wick Radical Workermen's	1	New		▲1	1.4	913	0.2	New
Ind. Conservative	0	New			—	55	0.0	New
Hamilton Liberal	0	New			—	14	0.0	New
Total	70			▲12	100.0	446,888	100.0	0.0
Registered voters, and turnout						530,118 (Note: Electorate in contested constituencies. The total electorate was 560,580.)	82.0	▲2.0

Popular vote
Liberal	53.3%
Conservative	34.3%
Ind. Liberal	8.0%
Crofters Party	3.7%
Other	0.7%

Parliamentary seats
Liberal	70.8%
Conservative	13.9%
Ind. Liberal	8.3%
Crofters Party	5.6%
WRA Liberal	1.4%

== University constituency results ==
=== Edinburgh and St Andrews Universities ===
General election 1885: Edinburgh & St Andrews Universities
Party	Candidate	Votes	%	±%
Conservative	John Macdonald CB QC LLD	2,840	53.7%	
Liberal	John Eric Erichsen	2,453	46.3%	
Turnout				
Conservative gain from Liberal		Swing		

=== Glasgow and Aberdeen Universities ===
General election 1885: Glasgow and Aberdeen Universities
Party	Candidate	Votes	%	±%
Conservative	James Alexander Campbell	Unopposed	Unopposed	N/A
Conservative hold				

== See also ==
- 1885 United Kingdom general election in England
- 1885 United Kingdom general election in Ireland
- 1885 United Kingdom general election in Wales
- History of Scotland § 19th century
