= 1885 United Kingdom general election in Wales =

- 24 Nov. – 18 Dec. 1885

All 34 Welsh seats to the House of Commons
- Turnout: 82.2% (▲3.9 pp)
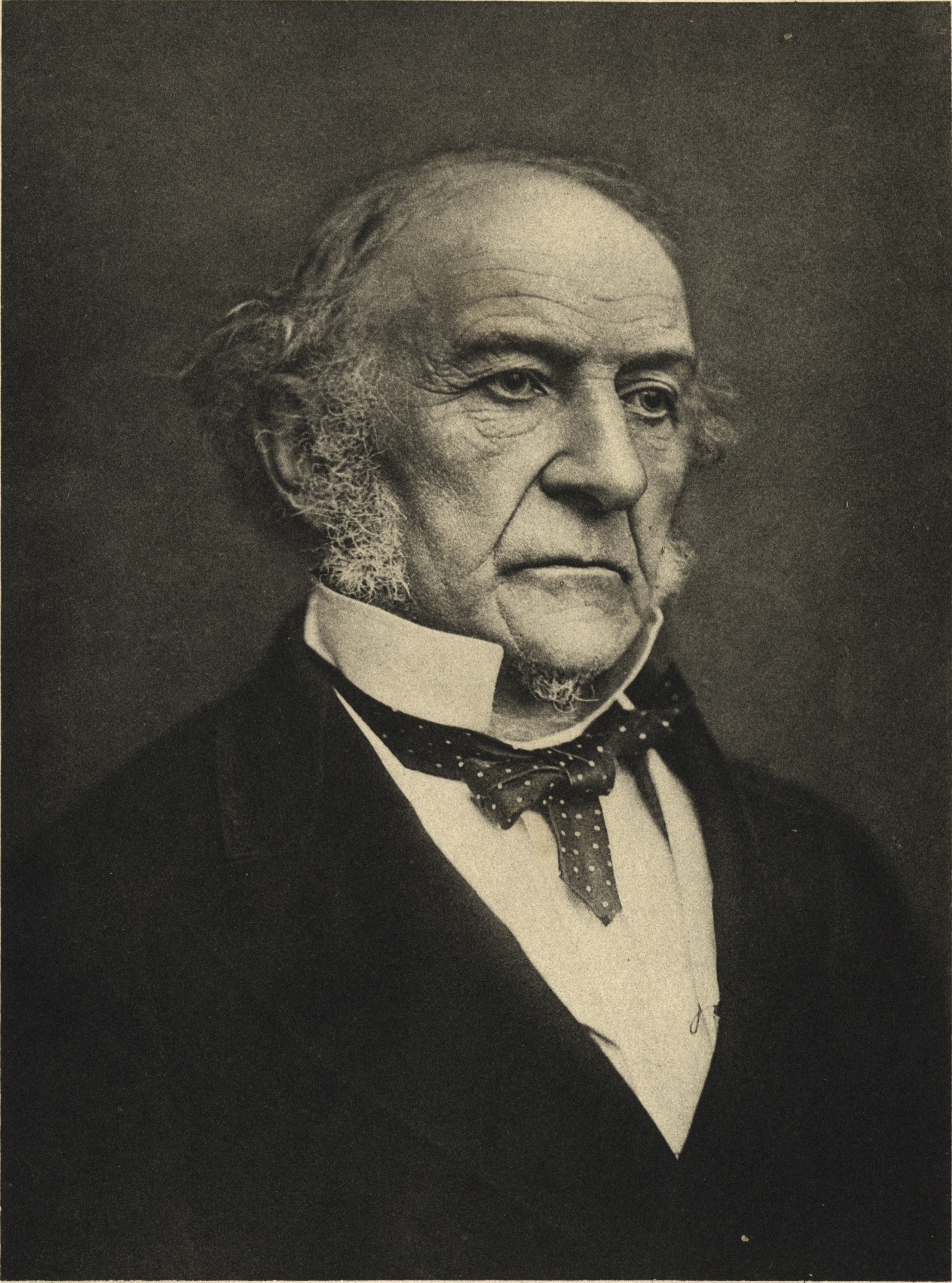

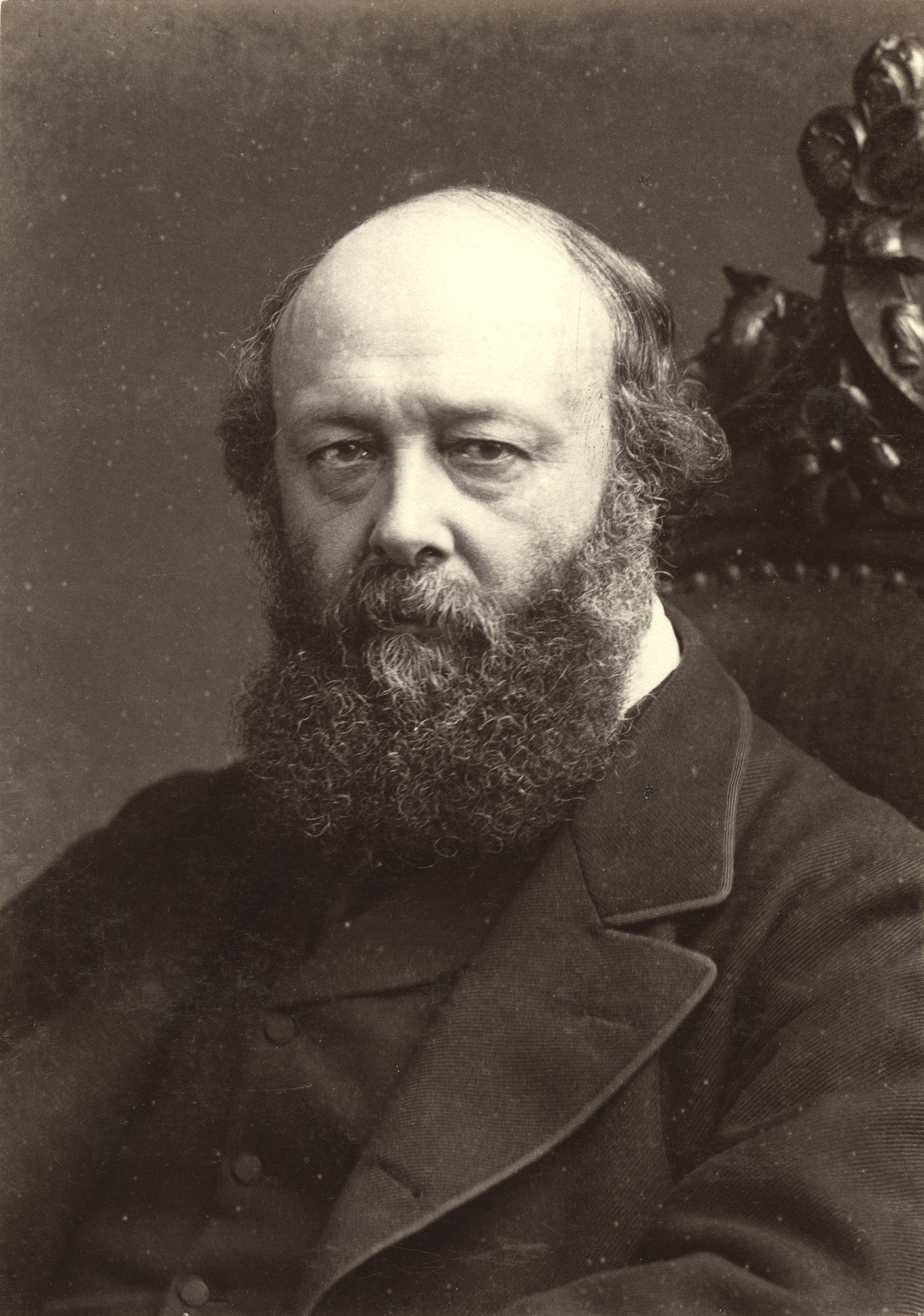
	First party	Second party
Leader	William Ewart Gladstone	Marquess of Salisbury
Party	Liberal	Conservative
Leader since	April 1880	April 1881
Leader's seat	Midlothian	House of Lords
Last election	29 seats, 58.8%	4 seats, 41.2%
Seats won	29	4
Seat change	Steady	Steady
Popular vote	119,231	79,690
Percentage	58.3%	38.9%
Swing	▼0.5 pp	▼2.3 pp

From 24 November to 18 December 1885, the 1885 United Kingdom general election was held in Wales; 34 members were elected in Wales out of a total of 670 members of the House of Commons. These 34 seats represented territorial constituencies contested under the first past the post electoral system amongst 33 constituencies.

The election came about due to the resignation of the Liberal Government and its request for a dissolution after a defeat in the House of Commons on an amendment to the Finance Bill by the Liberal Party. The Marquess of Salisbury then formed a minority Conservative Government, but within five months he requested a dissolution. As a result of the election nationally, the Liberal Party were returned with the greatest number of seats, but short of an overall majority in its own right.

== Electoral system ==
All constituencies were contested under the first past the post electoral system. It was the first general election to be held after enactment of the Representation of the People Act 1884, known also as the Third Reform Act. This was also accompanied by the Redistribution of Seats Act 1885. The former Act brought about an extension to rural areas of the United Kingdom of the franchise and voting rights which had already existed in towns, massively expanding the size of the Welsh electorate from 149,841 to 282,242. Together with the latter Act, it brought about the general use of single-member constituencies under first-past-the-post voting and increased the general distribution of more rural constituencies amongst the counties.

As part of the general redistribution, the number of Welsh seats increased from the 33 used from 1868 to 1880, to 34 seats. Although there were 34 seats, there were only 33 constituencies in Wales, with a two-member constituency of Merthyr Tydfil. This arrangement would last until 1918.

It was also the first election following the passing of the Corrupt and Illegal Practices Prevention Act 1883. This Act criminalised attempts to bribe voters and standardised the amount that could be spent on election expenses.

== Candidates ==
Candidates of the 1885 general election in Wales
Affiliation	Candidates
Liberal Party	34
Conservative Party	29
Independent Liberal	1 (Note: Candidate Morgan Lloyd stood in Merioneth.)
Independent Liberal-Labour	1 (Note: Candidate William Abraham stood in Rhondda.)
Total	65

== Analysis of results ==
In the United Kingdom as a whole, the Liberal Party under William Ewart Gladstone maintained its position as the largest party by way of seats, though it did not maintain its position as holding an overall majority in it own right. In spite of this, the Liberals maintained their dominant position in Wales, suffering a very minor swing against the party in comparison to the rival Conservatives. In all, the Liberals maintained 29 seats in Wales as well as holding the majority of the Welsh vote at 58.3%. Of the redistributed seats, the Liberal Party won the seats of Anglesey, Arfon, Carnarvon Boroughs, Eifion, East Denbighshire, West Denbighshire, Flint Boroughs, Flintshire, Merioneth, Montgomeryshire, Breconshire, Cardiganshire, Carmarthen Boroughs, East Carmarthenshire, West Carmarthenshire, Pembroke and Haverfordwest, Pembrokeshire, Cardiff, East Glamorganshire, Mid Glamorganshire, South Glamorganshire, Gower, Swansea District, Swansea Town, Monmouth Boroughs, North Monmouthshire and West Monmouthshire. The party also won both seats in the two-member constituency of Merthyr Tydfil.

The Conservative Party also saw relatively little change in terms of seats and vote share in Wales. Although it saw a larger drop in vote share of 2.3% when compared to the Liberal Party, it also maintained the same number of seats. The Conservatives won Denbigh Boroughs, Montgomery, Radnorshire and South Monmouthshire of the newly redistributed constituencies.

Outside of the major parties, trade unionist William Abraham stood as an Independent Liberal-Labour candidate, winning the new seat of Rhondda against a Liberal candidate. Abraham would hold the seat for the entirely of its existence, though subsequently stood in and with support of the Liberal Party following this election. Abraham himself would remain in Parliament (although later as a member of the Labour Party from 1910) until 1920.

Another candidate, Morgan Lloyd, who had previously represented the abolished seat of Beaumaris, contested the seat of Merioneth as an Independent Liberal candidate. He did so unsuccessfully, leaving Parliament at this election; however, Lloyd would later attempt to re-enter Parliament in 1892 general election as a member of the Liberal Unionist Party.

== Results ==
Party	Seats					Aggregate votes		
Party	Total	Gains	Losses	Net	Of total (%)	Total	Of total (%) (Note: Adjusted for multi-member constituencies.)	Change (%)
Liberal	29	—N/a (Note: Difficult to calculate due to significant boundary changes.)		Steady	85.3	119,231	58.3	▼0.5
Conservative	4	—N/a (Note: Difficult to calculate due to significant boundary changes.)		Steady	11.8	79,690	38.9	▼2.3
Independent Liberal-Labour	1	New		▲1	2.9	3,859	1.9	New
Independent Liberal	0	Did not stand in 1880			—	1,907	0.9	—N/a
Total	34			▲1	100.0	204,687	100.0	0.0
Registered voters, and turnout						249,147 (Note: Electorate in contested constituencies. The total electorate was 282,242.)	82.2	▲3.9

Popular vote
Liberal	58.3%
Conservative	38.9%
Ind. Lib-Lab	1.9%
Ind. Liberal	0.9%

Parliament seats
Liberal	85.3%
Conservative	11.8%
Ind. Lib-Lab	2.9%

== See also ==
- 1885 United Kingdom general election in England
- 1885 United Kingdom general election in Ireland
- 1885 United Kingdom general election in Scotland
- List of United Kingdom Parliament constituencies (1885–1918) by region
- List of MPs for constituencies in Wales (1885–1886)
