= Irish Conservative Party =

- Founded: 1834; 192 years ago
- Dissolved: 1891; 135 years ago
- Succeeded by: Irish Unionist Alliance
- Ideology: Conservatism; Irish unionism
- Political position: Centre-right
- National affiliation: Conservative Party
- Colours: Blue

The Irish Conservative Party, often called the Irish Tories, or sometimes referred to by the derogatory term, "soupers" was one of the dominant Irish political parties in Ireland in the 19th century. It was affiliated with the Conservative Party in Great Britain. Throughout much of the century it and the Irish Liberal Party were rivals for electoral dominance among Ireland's small electorate within the United Kingdom of Great Britain and Ireland, with parties such as the movements of Daniel O'Connell and later the Independent Irish Party relegated into third place. The Irish Conservatives became the principal element of the Irish Unionist Alliance following the alliance's foundation in 1891.

== History ==
As late as 1859, the Irish Conservative Party still won the greatest number of Irish seats in Westminster, in that year's general election winning a majority of the seats on offer. In the 1840s, the Conservative linked Irish Metropolitan Conservative Society supported Daniel O'Connell's call for repeal of the Act of Union, believing that a resurrected Irish parliament would offer the best chance to defend Protestant and/or unionist interests. Many saw themselves as the successors of Henry Grattan, and even of William Molyneux and his 1698 pamphlet, The Case of Ireland's being Bound by Acts of Parliament in England, in which he made an argument disputing the right of the English Parliament to legislate for Ireland, as the kingdom had had its own parliament from 1297 to 1800.

Though aligned mostly with the Conservative Party in Great Britain, the Irish Conservatives took independent stances on many issues, a fact made easier by the lack of rigid party voting at the time in the British House of Commons.

The loose support for Daniel O'Connell shifted during the Great Famine of 1845–48. The English Tory Sir Robert Peel's second ministry sent food shipments to Ireland from late 1845. However Peel lost power in 1846 to the Liberal Whig Lord John Russell, when his party split over reforming the Corn Laws. Russell was an old ally of O'Connell, and his new government preferred a laissez-faire policy of not sending food to the starving poor. Despite this, O'Connell's popularity held up remarkably well in the better-fed parts of Ireland.

Its main rival, the Liberals, lost out to Isaac Butt's Home Government Association (HGA) in the early 1870s, ironically, considering that the HGA was, to a significant extent, made up of former Irish Tories such as Butt himself.

Franchise reform, notably the Representation of the People (Ireland) Act 1868, the Ballot Act 1872 and the Representation of the People Act 1884 which increased the number of Catholic Nationalist electors, and the electoral triumph of the Irish Parliamentary Party under Charles Stewart Parnell, reduced its role as a major electoral force. By the 1880s, the electoral base of the Irish Conservatives had become restricted to Ulster and Dublin. In 1891, the leadership of the Irish Conservatives joined in the formation of the Irish Unionist Alliance (IUA), a new political party which aimed to represent unionists across Ireland. Numerous prominent Irish Conservative politicians subsequently sat for the IUA, including Edward James Saunderson and Walter Long, 1st Viscount Long. The IUA effectively continued the Irish wing of the Conservative Party, as its MPs took the Conservative whip at Westminster. The IUA dissolved in 1922.

Organisations associated with the Irish Conservative Party included the Irish Metropolitan Conservative Society in Dublin, later the Irish Reform Association, the Loyal Irish Union, the Irish Loyal and Patriotic Union and the Kildare Street Club, a gentleman's club in Kildare Street, Dublin. Prominent members included Isaac Butt and the Reverend Charles Boyton. It was strongly associated with the Dublin University Magazine founded by Butt and associates in 1833, and had a strong Trinity College Dublin academic input.

== Legacy ==
In the Irish Free State, the Irish Conservative Party did not re-establish itself and much of the IUA's Conservative electorate became supporters of Cumann na nGaedheal, forerunners of Fine Gael. In Northern Ireland, the Ulster Unionist Party became the leading conservative unionist party for much of the twentieth century. The UUP's historical roots were in the Irish Conservative Party, and its MPs took the Conservative whip at Westminster until 1972. Since 1989, the Conservative Party has also had its own official section in Northern Ireland, the Northern Ireland Conservatives.

== General election results ==
Election	House of Commons	Seats	Government	Votes
1835	12th Parliament	37 / 105	Whigs largest party (Peelite Govt)	42.4%
1837	13th Parliament	32 / 105	Whigs largest party (Peelite Govt)	41.5%
1841	14th Parliament	43 / 105	Conservative victory	40.1%
1847	15th Parliament	42 / 105	Conservative victory	31.0%
1852	16th Parliament	42 / 105	Conservative victory	
1857	17th Parliament	44 / 105	Liberal victory	
1859	18th Parliament	55 / 105	Liberal victory	38.9%
1865	19th Parliament	47 / 105	Liberal victory	44.4%
1868	20th Parliament	39 / 105	Liberal victory	41.9%
1874	21st Parliament	33 / 103	Conservative victory	40.8%
1880	22nd Parliament	23 / 103	Liberal victory	39.8%
1885	23rd Parliament	16 / 103	Liberal victory	24.8%
1886	24th Parliament	17 / 103	Conservative and Liberal Unionist victory	50.4%

Note: Results from Ireland for the UK general elections contested by the Irish Conservative Party.

== See also ==
- Category:Irish Conservative Party MPs

== Sources ==
- Alvin Jackson, Home Rule: An Irish History 1800–2000 (Phoenix, 2004)
- Andrew Shields, Irish Conservative Party, 1852–1868: Land, Politics and Religion (Irish Academic Press, Dublin, 2007)
