= 1885 United Kingdom general election in England =

- 24 Nov. – 18 Dec. 1885

All 461 English seats to the House of Commons
- Turnout: 81.9% (▲10.6 pp)
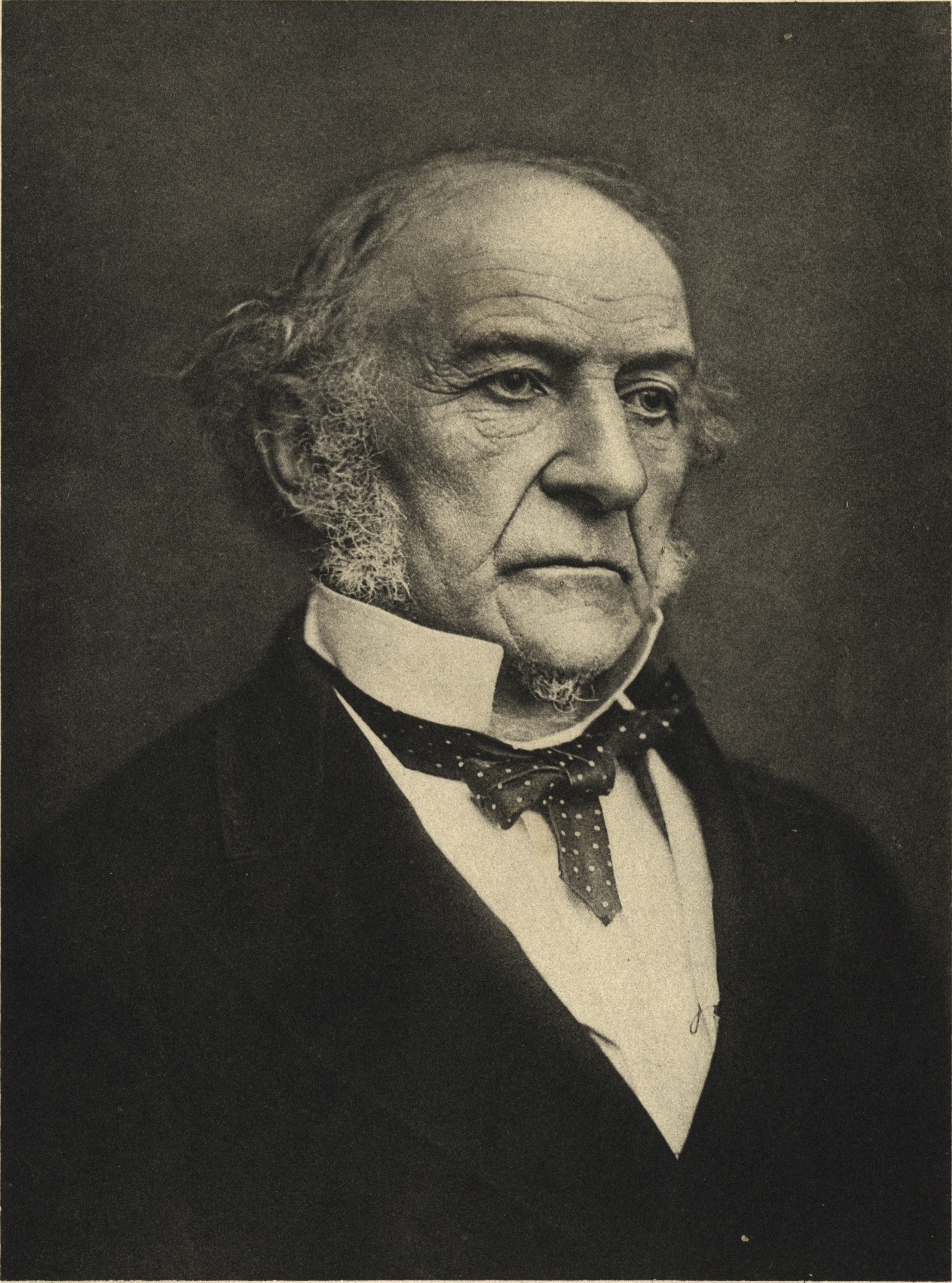

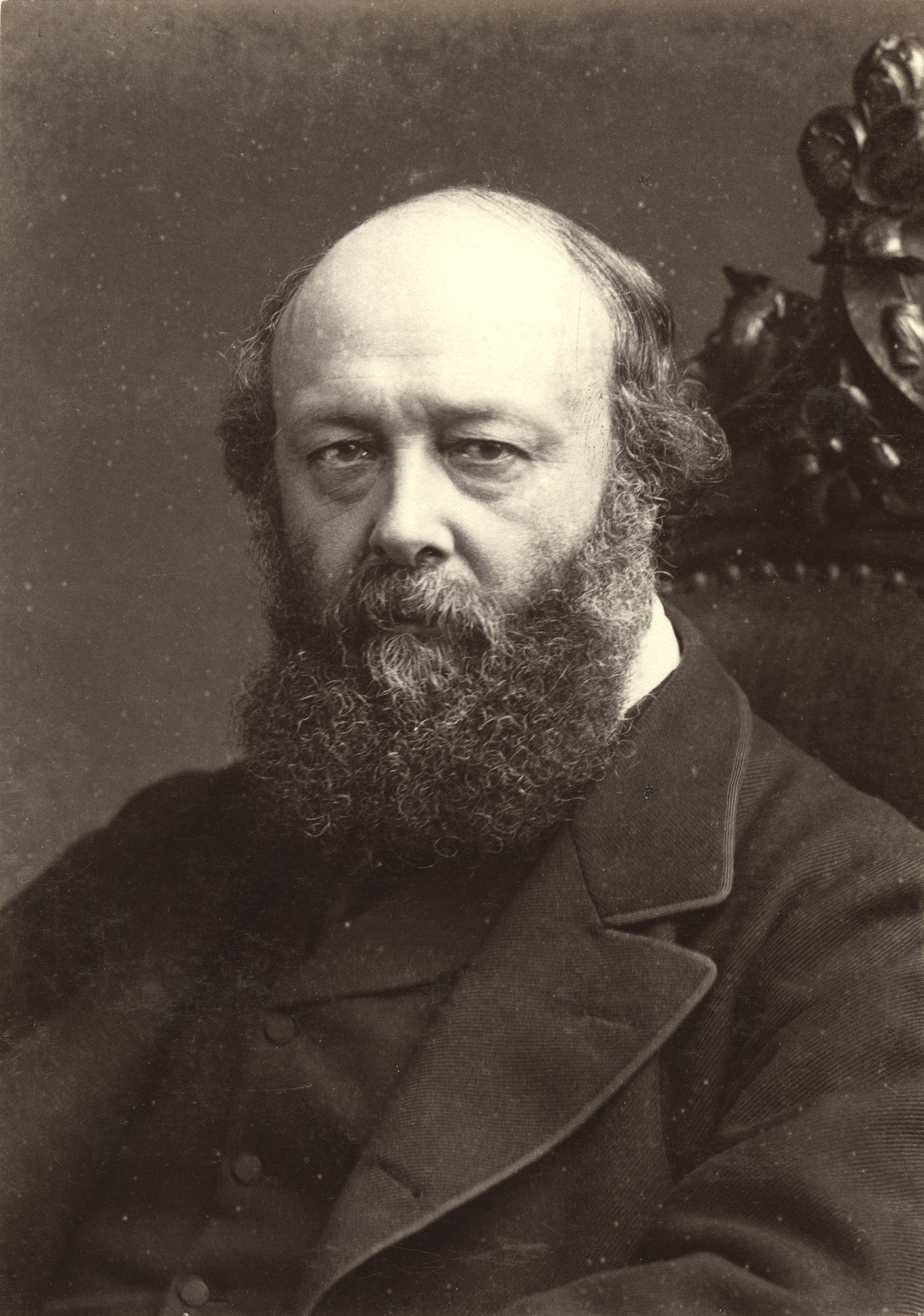
	First party	Second party
Leader	William Ewart Gladstone	Marquess of Salisbury
Party	Liberal	Conservative
Leader since	April 1880	April 1881
Leader's seat	Midlothian	House of Lords
Last election	255 seats, (Note: Combined results for county, borough and university seats.) 56.2%	201 seats, 41.2%
Seats won	239 (Note: Figure includes Speaker of the House of Commons Arthur Peel in Warwick and Leamington.)	217
Seat change	▼16	▲16
Popular vote	1,809,665 (Note: Total and percentage votes given here are for territorial constituencies only.)	1,675,757
Percentage	51.4%	47.5%
Swing	▼4.8 pp	▲6.3 pp

From 24 November to 18 December 1885, the 1885 United Kingdom general election was held in England, to elect all 670 members of the House of Commons, with 461 seats being in England. 456 seats represented territorial constituencies contested under the first past the post electoral system, and several multi-member constituencies under the block voting system; and 5 additional seats represented the 3 university constituencies which returned members under different voting systems.

The election came about due to the resignation of the Liberal Government and its request for a dissolution after a defeat in the House of Commons on an amendment to the Finance Bill by the Liberal Party. The Marquess of Salisbury then formed a minority Conservative Government, but within five months he requested a dissolution. As a result of the election nationally, the Liberal Party were returned with the greatest number of seats, but short of an overall majority in its own right.

== Electoral system ==
All constituencies were contested under the first past the post electoral system. It was the first general election to be held after enactment of the Representation of the People Act 1884, known also as the Third Reform Act. This was also accompanied by the Redistribution of Seats Act 1885. The former Act brought about an extension to rural areas of the United Kingdom of the franchise and voting rights which had already existed in towns, massively expanding the size of the English electorate from 2,338,809 to 4,094,674. Together with the latter Act, it brought about the general use of single-member constituencies under first-past-the-post voting and increased the general distribution of more rural constituencies amongst the counties.

As part of the general redistribution, the number of English seats increased from the 451 county and borough seats used from 1832 to 1880, to 456 seats. The five seats amongst the three university constituencies of Cambridge University, London University and Oxford University were unchanged. This arrangement would last until 1918.

It was also the first election following the passing of the Corrupt and Illegal Practices Prevention Act 1883. This Act criminalised attempts to bribe voters and standardised the amount that could be spent on election expenses.

== Candidates ==
Below is a table summarising the candidates of the 1885 general election in England, excluding those in the university constituencies.

Affiliation	Candidates
Liberal Party	452 (Note: Includes 15 Liberal-Labour candidates.)
Conservative Party	440
Independent Liberal	15
Independent Conservative	4 (Note: The candidates that stood were Henry Marriott Richardson in Bolton, William Cotton in City of London, Mortimer Neville Woodard in Liverpool Scotland and Douglas Henty in Petersfield.)
Independent Liberal-Labour	3 (Note: The candidates that stood were Neiles Boynton Billany in Kingston upon Hull Central, James Haslam in Chesterfield and James Johnston in Jarrow.)
Social Democratic Federation	3 (Note: The candidates that stood were Jack Williams in Hampstead, John Fielding in Kennington and John Burns in Nottingham West.)
Nationalist Party	2 (Note: The candidates that stood were T. P. O'Connor in Liverpool Scotland and John Redmond in Liverpool Kirkdale.)
Independent	1 (Note: Candidate Joseph Diggle stood in Marylebone West.)
Total	920

== Analysis ==
=== Major parties ===
Across the United Kingdom, the Liberal Party under the long-time leadership of William Ewart Gladstone saw a decreased in vote share and seats. These were primarily an exchange in favour of the Conservative Party led by the Marquess of Salisbury. In England, The Liberals saw a drop in vote share of 4.8% to 51.4%, with a decrease in seats amongst the county and borough constituencies by 16 seats to 238.

The Liberal Party also maintained several Liberal-Labour candidates amongst its number, with candidates standing with and in support of the Liberal Party and a respective trade union. 10 out of 15 such candidates were successfully elected in Bethnal Green North East, Birmingham Bordesley, Haggerston, Houghton-le-Spring, Mid Durham, Morpeth, North West Norfolk, Normanton, Wansbeck and West Ham South. The Liberal Party otherwise held its seat in the university constituency of London University unopposed. Overall, the party took 239 seats in England.

Conversely, the Conservative Party saw a relatively sharp rise in vote share by 6.3% to a share of 47.5%. The party also saw its seats in the county and boroughs constituencies rise by 16 seats overall to 213. It also maintained its four seats amongst the university constituencies, all of which were unopposed holds for the party. The party, therefore, took 271 seats in England.

=== Independent Liberals ===
Across England, much like what had occurred in Wales and Scotland, there was an expansion of independent and minor candidates which stood for election, particularly more radical Independent Liberal candidates across newly enfranchised rural constituencies following the Representation of the People Act 1884, as well as in borough constituencies. Amongst the Independent Liberal candidates which stood, four were elected in England, though several more were elected in Scotland, and one Independent Liberal-Labour candidate in Wales.

In England, four Independent Liberals were elected. This included Charles Conybeare in Camborne. However, Conybeare joined the Liberal Party before the 1886 general election. In Newcastle-upon-Tyne, candidate Joseph Cowen, who had lost the support of the local Liberal association, was elected as an Independent Liberal, taking one of the two seats in the constituency. He would, however, rejoin the Liberal Party and stand as a Liberal in the next election.

Further, former Liberal MP Edward Watkin was re-elected in Hythe, but as an Independent Liberal, owing to his relationship with the Liberal Party being inconsistent throughout his years in Parliament. Watkin would, however, join the soon-to-formed Liberal Unionist Party when it was formed the following year, and stand as a candidate for Liberal Unionist in 1886. In Peterborough, John Wentworth-FitzWilliam also retained his seat as an Independent Liberal, though would also join the Liberal Unionist before the next election.

=== Other parties ===
Much like in Wales, England saw some candidates standing as Independent Liberal-Labour candidates, with three of such standing in England. These were Neiles Boynton Billany in Kingston upon Hull Central, James Haslam in Chesterfield and James Johnston in Jarrow. None were successful. The newly-formed Social Democratic Federation, the first socialist party to stand in a general election, stood three candidate in England. None were successful, with the party receiving 657 votes in total.

For the first time, Irish Nationalists stood candidates in England. The only successful Nationalist Party candidate, T. P. O'Connor, was elected in Liverpool Scotland for the first time. He was a member of the Irish Parliamentary Party. O'Connor would hold the constituency through the remainder the century and into the early part of the twentieth century, until 1929. He was the only of such candidate to ever be elected to a constituency outside of Ireland, though others would stand in Liverpool borough constituencies.

== Seat summary ==
Below is a table summarising the total number of seats, gains and losses for each party in both the territorial county and borough constituencies and the English university constituencies.

Party	Seats				
Party	Total	Gains	Losses	Net	Of all (%)
Liberal	239 (Note: Includes 10 Liberal-Labour MPs.)	—N/a (Note: Difficult to calculate due to significant boundary changes.)		▼16	51.8
Conservative	217	—N/a		▲16	47.1
Independent Liberal	4	Did not stand in 1880		▲4	0.9
Irish Nationalist	1	New		▲1	0.2
Total	461			▲5	

== County and borough constituencies ==
Below is a table summarising the constituency results of the 1885 general election in England, excluding the result in the university constituencies.

Party	Seats					Aggregate votes		
Party	Total	Gains	Losses	Net	Of total (%)	Total	Of total (%) (Note: Adjusted for multi-member constituencies.)	Change (%)
Liberal	238 (Note: Includes 10 Liberal-Labour MPs.)	—N/a (Note: Difficult to calculate due to significant boundary changes.)		▼16	52.1	1,809,665	51.4	▼4.8
Conservative	213	—N/a		▲16	46.7	1,675,757	47.5	▲6.3
Independent Liberal	4	Did not stand in 1880		▲4	0.9	27,452	0.7	—N/a
Ind. Conservative	0	Did not stand in 1880			—	8,407	0.2	—N/a
Independent Liberal-Labour	0	New			—	4,373	0.1	New
Irish Nationalist	1 (Note: T. P. O'Connor in Liverpool Scotland.)	New		▲1	0.2	3,489	0.1	New
Social Democratic Federation	0	New			—	657	0.0	New
Independent	0	—N/a			—	101	0.0	Steady
Total	456			▲5	100.0	3,529,901	100.0	0.0
Registered voters, and turnout						4,052,079 (Note: Electorate in contested constituencies. The total electorate was 4,094,674.)	81.9	▲10.6

Popular vote
Liberal	51.4%
Conservative	47.5%
Irish Nationalist	0.1%
Other	1.0%

Parliament seats
Liberal	51.4%
Conservative	46.7%
Ind. Liberal	0.9%
Irish Nationalist	0.2%

== University constituency results ==
=== University results summary ===
Below is a table summarising the seats and vote share of the English university constituencies in the 1885 general election.

Party	Seats				Aggregate votes	
Party	Total	Gains	Losses	Net	Total	Of all (%)
Conservative	4	0	0	Steady	0	0.0
Liberal	1	0	0	Steady	0	0.0
Total	5				0	

=== Cambridge University ===
The constituency for Cambridge University returned two Members of Parliament using the Plurality block voting electoral system. The electorate consisted of graduates of the university.

General election 1885: Cambridge University (2 seats)
Party	Candidate	Votes	%	±%
Conservative	Alexander Beresford Hope	Unopposed		
Conservative	Henry Cecil Raikes	Unopposed		
Conservative hold				
Conservative hold				

=== London University ===
The constituency for London University returned one Member of Parliament using the First-past-the-post electoral system. The electorate consisted of graduates of the university.

General election 1885: London University
Party	Candidate	Votes	%	±%
Liberal	John Lubbock	Unopposed		
Liberal hold				

=== Oxford University ===
The constituency for Oxford University returned two Members of Parliament using the Plurality block voting electoral system. The electorate consisted of graduates of the university.

General election 24 November 1885: Oxford University (2 seats)
Party	Candidate	Votes	%	±%
Conservative	John Mowbray	Unopposed		
Conservative	John Gilbert Talbot	Unopposed		
Conservative hold				
Conservative hold				

== See also ==
- 1885 United Kingdom general election in Ireland
- 1885 United Kingdom general election in Scotland
- 1885 United Kingdom general election in Wales
- List of United Kingdom Parliament constituencies (1885–1918) by region
