= List of MPs for constituencies in Wales (1885–1886) =

- 24 November – 18 December 1885
- 1885 general election in England and Wales; Colours on map indicate the party allegiance of each constituency's MP.

This is a list of Members of Parliament elected to the Parliament of the United Kingdom between the 1885 United Kingdom general election and the 1886 United Kingdom general election.

== List of members of parliament ==
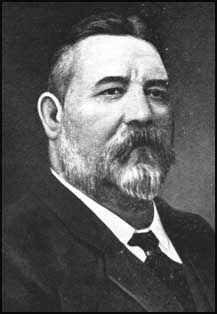
William Abraham (Mabon)

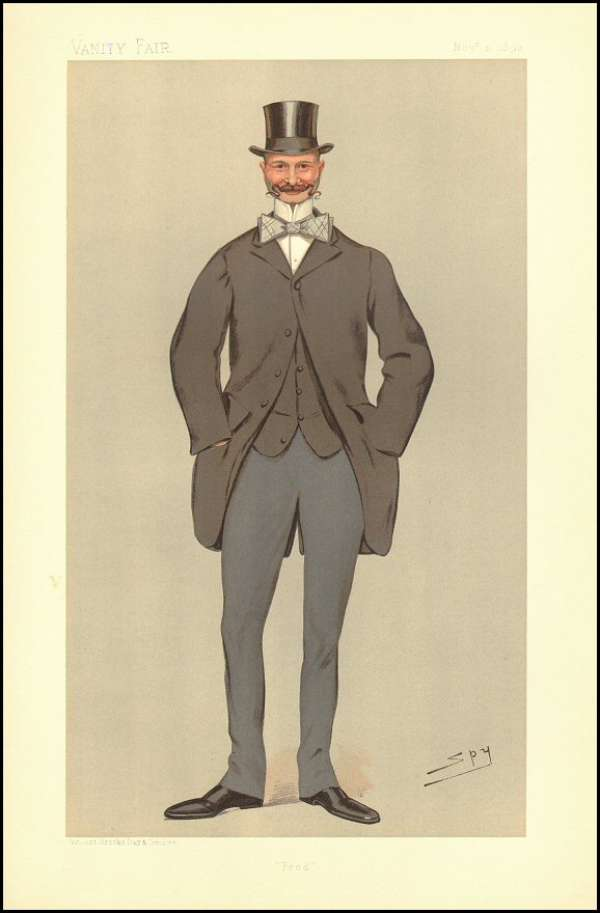
Frederick Courtenay Morgan yn Vanity Fair 1893

- William Abraham
- Henry George Allen
- Edward Hamer Carbutt
- David Davies
- Richard Davies
- William Davies
- Lewis Llewelyn Dillwyn
- William Fuller-Maitland
- Richard Grosvenor (until 1886)
- Thomas Phillips Price
- Walter Rice Howell Powell
- George Thomas Kenyon
- Charles Herbert James
- John Jones Jenkins
- Christopher Rice Mansel Talbot
- Love Jones-Parry
- Pryce Pryce-Jones
- Frederick Courtenay Morgan
- George Osborne Morgan
- David Pugh
- Edward James Reed
- Stuart Rendel
- John Bryn Roberts
- Henry Robertson
- William Rathbone
- Henry Richard
- John Roberts
- Alfred Thomas
- Samuel Smith (from 1886)
- John Henry Scourfield (until 1876)
- Henry Hussey Vivian
- Arthur Walsh
- Cornelius Marshall Warmington
- William Cornwallis-West
- Arthur John Williams
- Frank Ash Yeo

== See also ==
- 1885 United Kingdom general election
- 1885 United Kingdom general election in Wales
