= Loyal Irish Union =

Unionist group

The Loyal Irish Union was a unionist group formed in 1885 in Ireland.

The organisation was founded by Thomas Bateson, Lord Londonderry, the Marquis of Hamilton, Robert O'Neill (Chichester) and other prominent Conservative unionists from Belfast. It represented the wing of the Conservative Party which prioritised opposition to the Liberal Party over calls for bi-partisan opposition to Irish Home Rule. It campaigned alongside the local Irish Conservative Party associations in the 1885 general election, and the unionist candidates proved very successful against an overconfident Liberal Party.

Some supporters of the association envisioned it becoming a popular membership organisation, but only one branch was founded. The Loyal Irish Union was dissolved in January 1886, following the establishment and success of the bi-partisan Irish Loyal and Patriotic Union.
