= List of MPs for constituencies in Wales (1918–1922) =

- 14 December 1918
- Colours on map indicate the party allegiance of each constituency's MP.

This is a list of members of Parliament in Wales, elected to the House of Commons of the United Kingdom in the 1918 general election.

== Composition ==
Affiliation	Members
Coalition Liberal	18
Liberal Party	3
Labour Party	9
Conservative	4 (Note: Includes 3 non-Coalition Conservative MPs.)
Independent Labour	1
Coalition National Democratic	1
Total	36

== MPs ==
MP	Constituency	Party	In constituency since
William Abraham	Rhondda West	Labour Party	1918
William Brace	Abertillery	Labour Party	1918
Charles Edward Breese	Caernarvonshire	Coalition Liberal	1918
William Cope	Llandaff and Barry	Coalition Conservative	1918
James Cory	Cardiff South	Conservative Party	1918
David Davies	Montgomeryshire	Liberal Party	1906
David Davies	Denbigh	Coalition Liberal	1918
Charles Edwards	Bedwellty	Labour Party	1918
Jack Edwards	Aberavon	Coalition Liberal	1918
John Hugh Edwards	Neath	Coalition Liberal	1918
Leolin Forestier-Walker	Monmouth	Conservative Party	1918
James Childs Gould	Cardiff Central	Conservative Party	1918
Thomas Griffiths	Pontypool	Labour Party	1918
Vernon Hartshorn	Ogmore	Labour Party	1918
Lewis Haslam	Newport	Coalition Liberal	1918
John Hinds	Carmarthen	Coalition Liberal	1918
Edgar Jones	Merthyr	Coalition Liberal	January 1910
Evan Jones	Pembrokeshire	Coalition Liberal	1918
Henry Haydn Jones	Merioneth	Liberal Party	January 1910
Thomas Arthur Lewis	Pontypridd	Coalition Liberal	1918
David Lloyd George	Caernarvon Boroughs	Coalition Liberal	1890
Alfred Mond	Swansea West	Coalition Liberal	1918
Alfred Onions	Caerphilly	Labour Party	1918|-
Tom Parry	Flintshire	Coalition Liberal	1918
Thomas Richards	Ebbw Vale	Labour Party	1918
Sidney Robinson	Brecon and Radnor	Coalition Liberal	1918
William Seager	Cardiff East	Liberal Party	1918
Charles Stanton	Aberdare	Coalition National Democratic	1918
Robert Thomas	Wrexham	Coalition Liberal	1918
Owen Thomas	Anglesey	Independent Labour	1918
Matthew Vaughan-Davies	Cardiganshire	Coalition Liberal	1895
David Watts-Morgan	Rhondda East	Labour Party	1918
Thomas Williams	Swansea East	Coalition Liberal	1918
Towyn Jones	Llanelli	Coalition Liberal	1918
John Williams	Gower	Labour Party	1906
Herbert Lewis	University of Wales	Coalition Liberal	1918

== By-elections ==
- 1920 Abertillery by-election
- 1922 Newport by-election
- 1920 Ebbw Vale by-election
- 1921 Cardiganshire by-election
- 1920 Rhondda West by-election
- 1921 Caerphilly by-election
- 1922 Pontypridd by-election
- 1919 Swansea East by-election

== See also ==
- List of MPs elected in the 1918 United Kingdom general election
- 1918 United Kingdom general election
- 1918 United Kingdom general election in Wales
