= Irish Metropolitan Conservative Society =

- Chairperson: William Shirley Ball
- Founder: Rev. Charles Boyton; Isaac Butt
- Founded: 1836; 189 years ago
- Dissolved: 1844; 181 years ago
- Preceded by: Irish Protestant Conservative Society
- Ideology: Irish autonomy Ascendancy Hegemony; Conservatism
- Religion: Anglicanism
- National affiliation: Irish Conservative Party; Repeal Association

The Irish Metropolitan Conservative Society was an Irish political movement based in Dublin which was linked to the Irish Conservative Party, the main political party in Ireland until 1859.

== History ==
The Irish Metropolitan Conservative Society was formed in 1836 by the Reverend Charles Boyton and Isaac Butt and was largely led by academics of Trinity College Dublin, and writers for the Dublin University Magazine, which had been founded by Butt. Boyton (1799?-1844) was a 1819 TCD graduate who had tutored William Rowan Hamilton in mathematics. The first meeting took place at 19, Dawson Street, Dublin, on 16 November 1836, and the new organisation superseded the former Irish Protestant Conservative Society.

In a debate in 1840 the Society famously voted to back the Repeal political campaign of the leader of Irish nationalism, Daniel O'Connell, although for different reasons. While O'Connell believed that repeal of the Act of Union would see the emergence of an Irish nationalist-dominated parliament, the IMCS members saw the return of the King, Lords and Commons of Ireland as offering the best way to ensure the power and influence of the Ascendancy. In the debate of 1840, Butt was the main speaker in opposition to the motion for Repeal.

The Society was wound up in 1844, during the second ministry of Sir Robert Peel, when a special meeting was held for the purpose. Its leaders stated that it had proved impracticable to carry it on, "owing to the prevailing apathy now manifested by Protestants in the cause of Conservatism and the consequent falling away of the friends and supporters of the Society and its funds". The Chairman, Captain William Shirley Ball, reported that the previous week Repealers had gained a large majority on the Dublin City Registry and that gentlemen who had fought the battles of conservatism had been "marked as partisans and excluded from Ministerial patronage and favour". He was disappointed that such were the fruits of a Conservative government.

In 1870 Butt and other Irish Tories founded the Home Government Association to campaign for Irish home rule.
