= List of parliamentary boroughs and associated county constituencies 1832–1918 =

This article lists parliamentary boroughs and associated county constituencies 1832–1918. During this period, non-resident 40-shilling freeholders of (usually) land located in a borough qualified for a parliamentary vote in the county.

== Franchise provisions ==
Amongst the qualifications for a county vote in United Kingdom parliamentary elections, which applied from 1832 until 1918, was the possession of a freehold estate of the annual value of 40 shillings. Residence on the property was not required from freeholders. A freehold situate in a Parliamentary borough qualified the owner for the county vote, unless it was in his own occupation.

== List of associated constituencies ==
The list includes all county constituencies 1832–1885, even if there are no associated boroughs. From 1885 the county constituency is only listed if it is known to have been associated with a borough.

The place of election was where the hustings were held; at which candidates were nominated, polling took place (before the introduction of multiple polling places in county constituencies) and where the result was announced.

=== England ===
Some boroughs were a city or town which was a county of itself, in which the non-resident freeholders were ancient right voters in the borough. This applied to Bristol, Exeter, Norwich, and Nottingham. Those boroughs are not included in the list below.

Period	County constituency	Place of election	Parliamentary borough
	Bedfordshire		
1832–1885	Bedfordshire	Bedford	Bedford
1885–1918	Biggleswade	N/A	Bedford
	Berkshire		
1832–1885	Berkshire	Abingdon	Abingdon
1832–1885	Berkshire	Abingdon	Reading
1832–1885	Berkshire	Abingdon	Wallingford
1832–1885	Berkshire	Abingdon	Windsor
1885–1918	Newbury	N/A	Reading
1885–1918	Wokingham	N/A	Windsor
	Buckinghamshire		
1832–1885	Buckinghamshire	Aylesbury	Aylesbury
1832–1885	Buckinghamshire	Aylesbury	Buckingham
1832–1885	Buckinghamshire	Aylesbury	Great Marlow
1832–1885	Buckinghamshire	Aylesbury	Wycombe
	Cambridgeshire		
1832–1885	Cambridgeshire	Cambridge	Cambridge
1885–1918	Chesterton	N/A	Cambridge
	Cheshire ^{a}		
1832–1868	North Cheshire	Knutsford	Macclesfield
1832–1868	North Cheshire	Knutsford	Stockport
1832–1868	South Cheshire	Chester	Chester
1868–1885	East Cheshire	Macclesfield	
1868–1885	Mid Cheshire	Knutsford	
1868–1885	West Cheshire	Chester	
1885–1918	Altrincham	N/A	Stockport
1885–1918	Eddisbury	N/A	Chester
1885–1918	Hyde	N/A	Stalybridge
1885–1918	Wirral	N/A	Birkenhead ^{b}
	Cornwall		
1832–1885	East Cornwall	Bodmin	Bodmin
1832–1885	East Cornwall	Bodmin	Launceston
1832–1885	East Cornwall	Bodmin	Liskeard
1832–1885	West Cornwall	Truro	Helston
1832–1885	West Cornwall	Truro	Penryn and Falmouth
1832–1885	West Cornwall	Truro	St Ives
1832–1885	West Cornwall	Truro	Truro
1885–1918	Truro	N/A	Penryn and Falmouth
	Cumberland		
1832–1885	East Cumberland	Carlisle	Carlisle
1832–1885	West Cumberland	Cockermouth	Cockermouth
1832–1885	West Cumberland	Cockermouth	Whitehaven
1885–1918	Egremont	N/A	Whitehaven
1885–1918	Eskdale	N/A	Carlisle
	Derbyshire ^{a}		
1832–1868	North Derbyshire	Bakewell	N/A
1832–1868	South Derbyshire	Derby	Derby
1868–1885	East Derbyshire	Chesterfield	N/A
1868–1885	North Derbyshire	Bakewell	N/A
1868–1885	South Derbyshire	Derby	Derby
1885–1918	South Derbyshire	N/A	Derby
	Devon ^{a}		
1832–1868	North Devon	South Molton	Barnstaple
1832–1868	North Devon	South Molton	Tiverton
1832–1868	South Devon	Exeter	Ashburton
1832–1868	South Devon	Exeter	Dartmouth
1832–1868	South Devon	Exeter	Devonport
1832–1868	South Devon	Exeter	Honiton
1832–1868	South Devon	Exeter	Plymouth
1832–1868	South Devon	Exeter	Tavistock
1832–1868	South Devon	Exeter	Totnes
1868–1885	East Devon		
1868–1885	North Devon		
1868–1885	South Devon		
1885–1918	Tavistock	N/A	Devonport
1885–1918	Tavistock	N/A	Plymouth
	Dorset		
1832–1885	Dorset	Dorchester	Bridport
1832–1885	Dorset	Dorchester	Dorchester
1832–1885	Dorset	Dorchester	Lyme Regis
1832–1885	Dorset	Dorchester	Poole
1832–1885	Dorset	Dorchester	Shaftesbury
1832–1885	Dorset	Dorchester	Wareham
1832–1885	Dorset	Dorchester	Weymouth and Melcombe Regis
	County Durham		
1832–1885	North Durham	City of Durham	City of Durham
1832–1885	North Durham	City of Durham	Gateshead
1832–1885	North Durham	City of Durham	South Shields
1832–1885	North Durham	City of Durham	Sunderland
1832–1885	South Durham	Darlington	N/A
1885–1918	Chester-le-Street	N/A	Gateshead
1885–1918	Houghton-le-Spring	N/A	Sunderland
1885–1918	Jarrow	N/A	South Shields
1885–1918	Mid Durham	N/A	City of Durham
1885–1918	South East Durham	N/A	Darlington
1885–1918	South East Durham	N/A	The Hartlepools
1885–1918	South East Durham	N/A	Stockton-on-Tees
	Essex ^{a}		
1832–1868	North Essex	Braintree	Colchester
1832–1868	North Essex	Braintree	Harwich
1832–1868	South Essex	Chelmsford	Maldon
1885–1918	Harwich	N/A	Colchester
1885–1918	Romford	N/A	West Ham North
1885–1918	Romford	N/A	West Ham South
	Gloucestershire		
1832–1885	East Gloucestershire	Gloucester	Cheltenham
1832–1885	East Gloucestershire	Gloucester	Cirencester
1832–1885	East Gloucestershire	Gloucester	Gloucester
1832–1885	East Gloucestershire	Gloucester	Stroud
1832–1885	East Gloucestershire	Gloucester	Tewkesbury
1832–1885	West Gloucestershire	Dursley	N/A
1885–1918	Tewkesbury	N/A	Cheltenham
1885–1918	Tewkesbury	N/A	Gloucester
	Hampshire		
1832–1885	North Hampshire	Winchester	
1832–1885	South Hampshire	Southampton	
	Herefordshire		
1832–1885	Herefordshire	Hereford	
	Hertfordshire		
1832–1885	Hertfordshire	Hertford	
	Huntingdonshire		
1832–1885	Huntingdonshire	Huntingdon	
	Isle of Wight		
1832–1885	Isle of Wight	Newport	
	Kent ^{a}		
1832–1868	East Kent	Canterbury	
1832–1868	West Kent	Maidstone	
	Lancashire ^{a}		
1832–1868	North Lancashire	Lamcaster	
1832–1868	South Lancashire	Newton	
	Leicestershire		
1832–1885	North Leicestershire	Loughborough	
1832–1885	South Leicestershire	Leicester	
	Lincolnshire ^{a}		
1832–1868	Parts of Kesteven and Holland	Sleaford	
1832–1868	Parts of Lindsey	Lincoln	
	Middlesex		
1832–1885	Middlesex	Brentford	
	Norfolk ^{a}		
1832–1868	East Norfolk	Norwich	
1832–1868	West Norfolk	Swaffham	
	Northamptonshire		
1832–1885	North Northamptonshire	Kettering	
1832–1885	South Northamptonshire	Northampton	
	Northumberland		
1832–1885	North Northumberland	Alnwick	
1832–1885	South Northumberland	Hexham	
	Nottinghamshire		
1832–1885	North Nottinghamshire	Mansfield	
1832–1885	South Nottinghamshire	Newark-on-Trent	
	Oxfordshire		
1832–1885	Oxfordshire	Oxford	
	Rutland		
1832–1918	Rutland	Oakham	N/A
	Shropshire		
1832–1885	North Shropshire	Shrewsbury	
1832–1885	South Shropshire	Church Stretton	
	Somerset ^{a}		
1832–1868	East Somerset	Wells	
1832–1868	West Somerset	Taunton	
	Staffordshire ^{a}		
1832–1868	North Staffordshire	Stafford	
1832–1868	South Staffordshire	Lichfield	
	Suffolk		
1832–1885	East Suffolk	Ipswich	
1832–1885	West Suffolk	Bury St. Edmunds	
	Surrey ^{a}		
1832–1868	East Surrey	Croydon	
1832–1868	West Surrey	Guildford	
	Sussex		
1832–1885	East Sussex	Lewes	
1832–1885	West Sussex	Chichester	
	Warwickshire		
1832–1885	North Warwickshire	Coleshill	
1832–1885	South Warwickshire	Warwick	
	Westmorland		
1832–1885	Westmorland	Appleby	
	Wiltshire		
1832–1885	North Wiltshire	Devizes	
1832–1885	South Wiltshire	Salisbury	
	Worcestershire		
1832–1885	East Worcestershire	Droitwich	
1832–1885	West Worcestershire	Worcester	
	Yorkshire ^{a}		
1832–1868	East Riding of Yorkshire	Beverley	
1832–1868	North Riding of Yorkshire	York	
1832–1865	West Riding of Yorkshire ^{c}	Wakefield	

Notes:-

- ^{a} County divisions redistributed in 1868. No information currently available about the association of divisions with Parliamentary boroughs 1868–1885.
- ^{b} Birkenhead was enfranchised in 1861 and its association with a county division is unavailable until the 1885 redistribution.
- ^{c} West Riding of Yorkshire divided in two in 1865 and three in 1868.

== See also ==
- Parliamentary franchise in the United Kingdom 1885–1918
- Forty Shilling Freeholders
