= 1885 United Kingdom general election =

- 24 November – 18 December 1885

All 670 seats in the House of Commons 336 seats needed for a majority
- Registered: 5,429,708 (Note: Electorate in contested constituencies. The total electorate was 5,708,030.)
- Turnout: 4,638,235; 81.2% (▲9.0 pp)
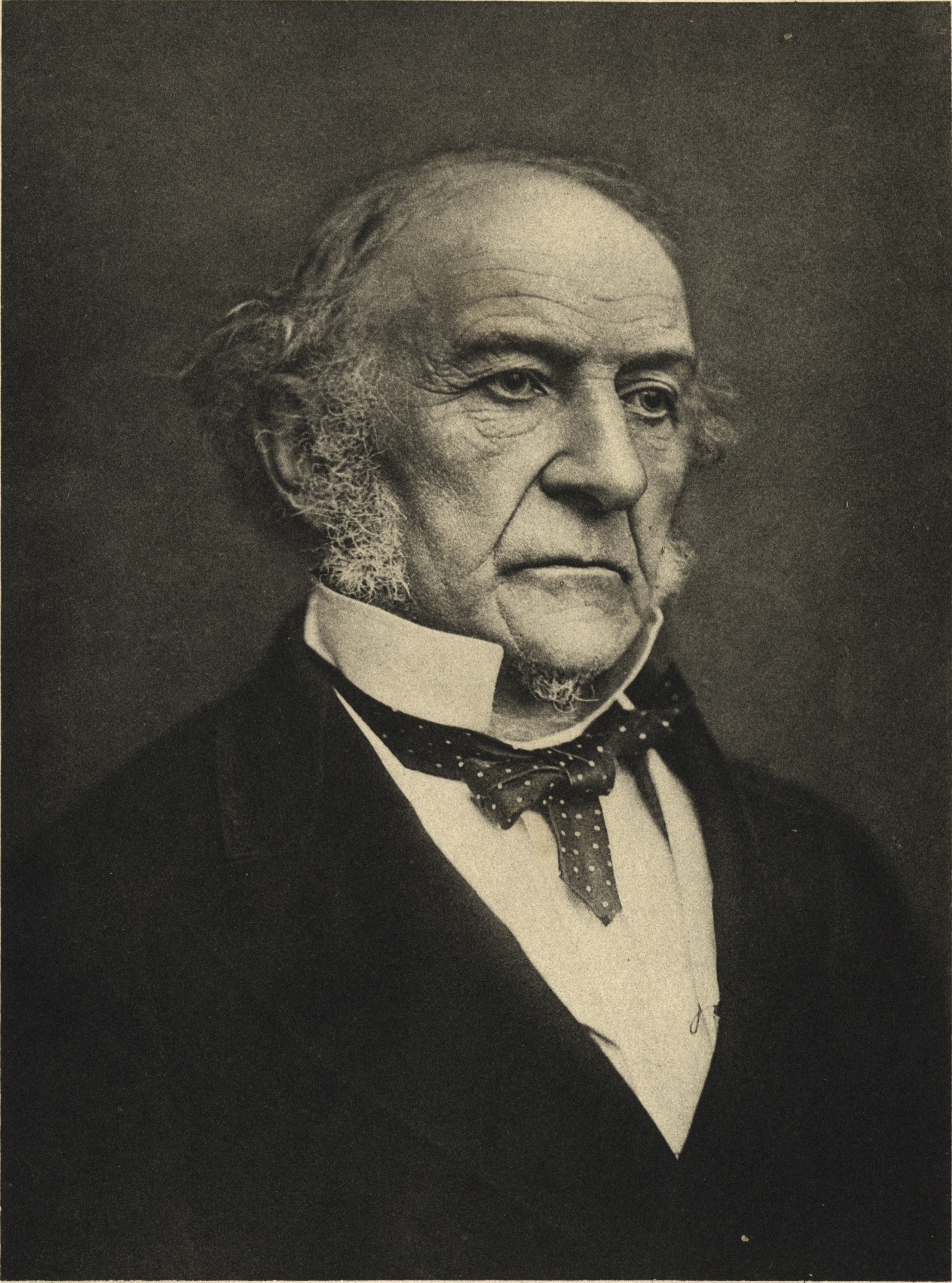

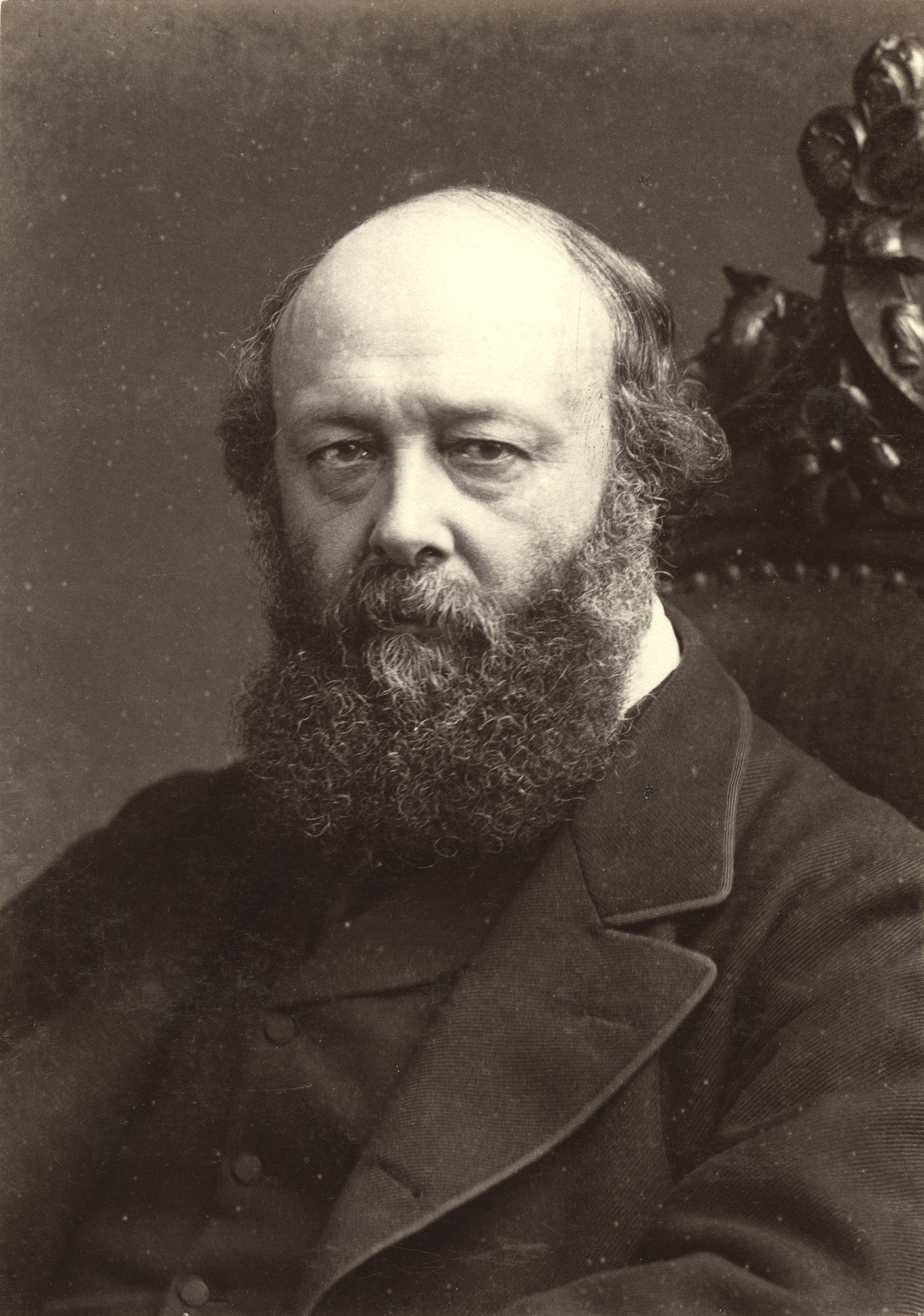

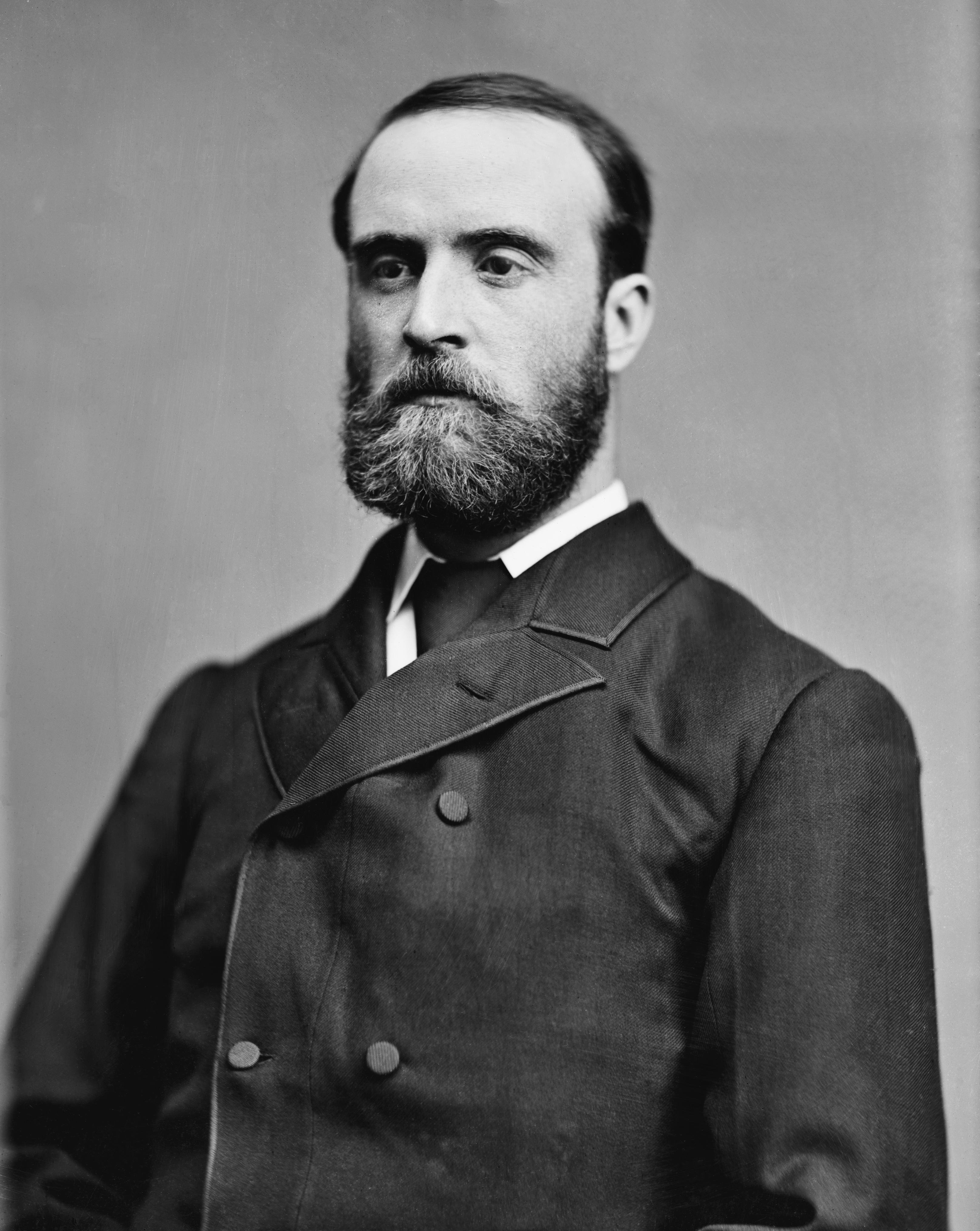
	First party	Second party	Third party
Leader	William Gladstone	Marquess of Salisbury	Charles Stewart Parnell
Party	Liberal	Conservative	Irish Parliamentary
Leader since	April 1880	April 1881	17 October 1882
Leader's seat	Midlothian	House of Lords	Cork City
Last election	352 seats, 54.7%	237 seats, 42.5%	63 seats, 2.8%
Seats won	319 (Note: Figure includes Speaker of the House of Commons Arthur Peel in Warwick and Leamington.)	247	86
Seat change	▼33	▲10	▲23
Popular vote	2,199,919	2,012,747	307,242
Percentage	47.4%	43.5%	6.9%
Swing	▼6.7 pp	▲1.0 pp	▲4.1 pp

- Diagram displaying the composition of the House of Commons following the general election
Prime Minister before election
Marquess of Salisbury
Conservative
Prime Minister after election
William Gladstone
Liberal

The 1885 United Kingdom general election was held from 24 November to 18 December 1885. The first general election after an extension of the franchise and redistribution of seats, it saw the Liberals lose their majority.

The election came about due to the resignation of the Liberal Government and request for a dissolution after a defeat in the House of Commons on an amendment to the Finance Bill by the Liberal Party. The Marquess of Salisbury formed subsequently a minority Conservative Government but within five months he requested a dissolution.

The election saw the Liberals, led by William Gladstone, win the most seats, but not an overall majority, so a minority government was necessary. The Irish Nationalists held the balance of power between the Liberals and the Conservatives who sat with a large number of allied Unionist MPs (their name reflecting their support for the Union of Great Britain and Ireland). The pressure of minority government status exacerbated divisions within the Liberals over Irish Home Rule. That led to a Liberal split that caused another general election the following year.

The 1885 election saw the first socialist party participate, with the Social Democratic Federation, led by H. M. Hyndman, standing three candidates. None were elected.

== Electoral system ==
All constituencies contested under the first past the post electoral system. It was the first general election to be held after enactment of the Representation of the People Act 1884, known also as the Third Reform Act. This was also accompanied with the Redistribution of Seats Act 1885. The former Act brought about an extension of the franchise and voting rights which had already existed in towns to rural areas of the United Kingdom, massively expanding the size of the electorate from 3,040,050 to 5,708,030 across the country. Together with the latter Act, it brought about the general use of single-member constituencies under first-past-the-post voting and increased the general distribution of more rural constituencies amongst the counties.

As part of the general re-distribution, the number of Welsh seats from the 652 used between 1832 to 1880, to 670 seats. Although there were 670 seats, there were several multi-member constituencies (with at most two members each) in areas in England and one in Wales. This arrangement would last until the reformes before the 1918 general election.

It was also the first election following the passing of the Corrupt and Illegal Practices Prevention Act 1883. This Act criminalised attempts to bribe voters and standardised the amount that could be spent on election expenses.

== Results ==
The following tables are based on the collations of seats and votes collected by F. W. S. Craig for the results in Great Britain, and seats and votes collected by Brian Mercer Walker for Ireland. The distinctions made between the Conservatives, Irish Unionists and Liberal Unionists in alterations to these works are set out according to Wesley Ferris.

=== Summary of seats returned ===
Party	Leader	MPs		Aggregate votes	
Party	Leader		Of total		Of total (Note: Adjusted for multi-member constituencies.)
Liberal Party	William Ewart Gladstone	319 (Note: Includes 10 Liberal-Labour MPs.)	47.6%	2,199,919	47.4%
Conservative Party	Marquess of Salisbury	247	36.9%	2,012,747	43.5%
Irish Parliamentary Party	Charles Stewart Parnell	86 (Note: Includes T. P. O'Connor in Liverpool Scotland.)	12.8%	307,242	6.9%
Independent Liberal	—N/a	11	1.6%	66,605	1.3%
Crofters Party	Gavin Brown Clark	4	0.6%	16,551	0.4%
Independent Conservative	—N/a	2	0.3%	15,921	0.2%
Independent Liberal-Labour	—N/a	1	0.1%	8,232	0.2%

=== Full results ===

Results of the November-December 1885 general election to the House of Commons of the United Kingdom
Party	Leader	Candidates	MPs					Aggregate votes		
Party	Leader	Candidates	Total	Gains	Losses	Net	Of total (%)	Total	Of total (%) (Note: Adjusted for multi-member constituencies.)	Change (%)
Liberal	William Ewart Gladstone	575 (Note: Includes 18 Liberal-Labour candidates.)	319 (Note: Includes 10 Liberal-Labour MPs.)	—N/a (Note: Difficult to calculate due to significant boundary changes.)		▼33	47.6	2,199,919	47.4	▼6.7
Conservative	Marquess of Salisbury	597	247	—N/a		▲10	36.9	2,199,919	43.5	▲1.0
Irish Parliamentary	Charles Stewart Parnell	92	86	—N/a		▲23	12.8	307,242	6.9	▲4.1
Independent Liberal	—N/a	36	11	Did not stand in 1880		▲11	1.6	66,605	1.3	—N/a
Crofters	Gavin Brown; Clark	6	4	New		▲4	0.6	16,551	0.4	New
Independent; Conservative	—N/a	8	2	Did not stand in 1880		▲2	0.3	15,921	0.2	—N/a
Independent; Liberal-Labour	—N/a	4	1	New		▲1	0.1	8,232	0.2	New
Independent	—N/a	5	0	—N/a			—	3,714	0.0	Steady
Scottish Land Restoration	William; Forsyth	5	0	New			—	2,359	0.1	New
Irish Loyal and Patriotic	—N/a	6	0	New			—	1,869	0.0	New
Independent; Nationalist	—N/a	1	0	Did not stand in 1880			—	1,451	0.0	—N/a
Social Democratic Federation	Henry; Hyndman	3	0	New			—	657	0.0	New
Total		1,338	670			▲18	100.0	4,638,235	100.0	0.0
Registered voters, and turnout								5,429,708 (Note: Electorate in contested constituencies. The total electorate was 5,708,030.)	81.2	▲9.0

=== Popular vote ===
Popular vote
Liberal	47.4%
Conservative	43.5%
Irish Parliamentary	6.9%
Others	2.2%

=== Parliament seats ===
Parliamentary seats
Liberal	47.6%
Conservative	36.9%
Irish Parliamentary	12.8%
Ind. Liberal	1.6%
Crofters	0.6%
Ind. Conservative	0.3%
Ind. Lib-Lab	0.1%

== See also ==
- 1885 United Kingdom general election in England
- 1885 United Kingdom general election in Ireland
- 1885 United Kingdom general election in Scotland
- 1885 United Kingdom general election in Wales
- List of MPs elected in the 1885 United Kingdom general election
- List of United Kingdom Parliament constituencies (1885–1918) by region
- List of MPs for constituencies in Wales (1885–1886)
- Parliamentary franchise in the United Kingdom 1885–1918
- Representation of the People Act 1884
- Redistribution of Seats Act 1885
- Hawarden Kite, Gladstone announces for Home Rule and wins over the Irish
