= 1918 United Kingdom general election in Wales =

- 14 December 1918

All 36 Welsh seats to the House of Commons
- Turnout: 65.9% (▼12.4 pp)
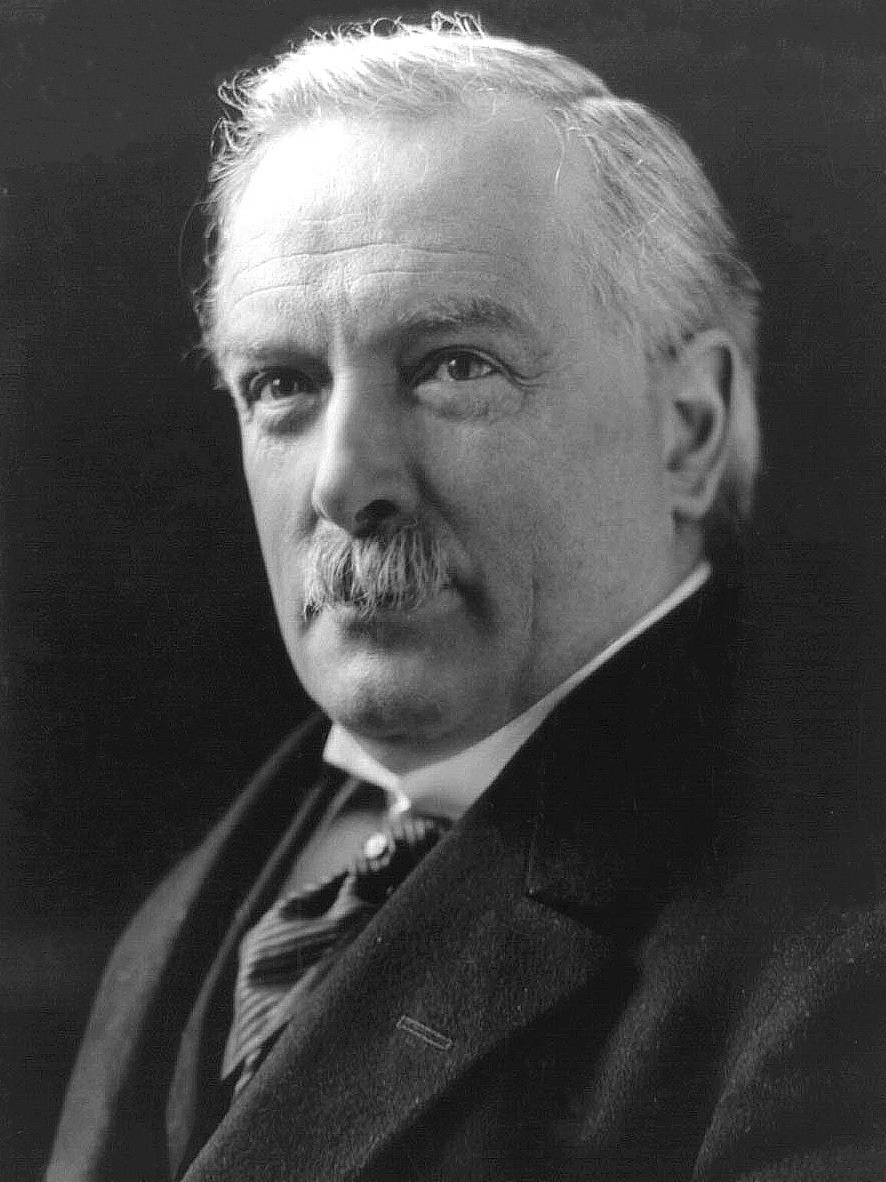

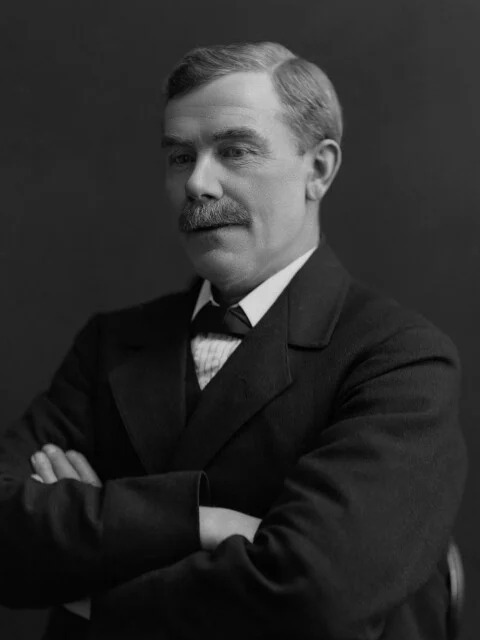

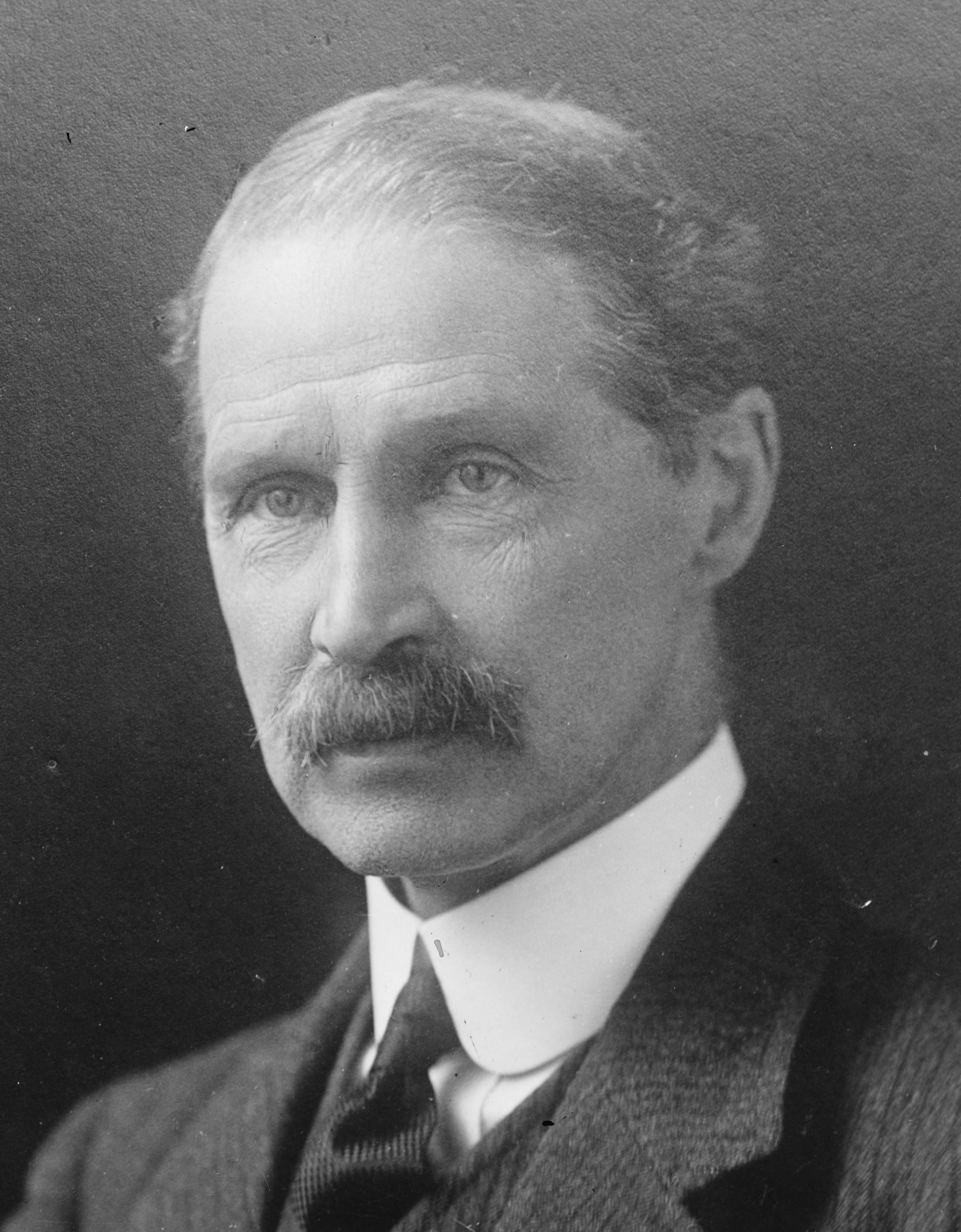

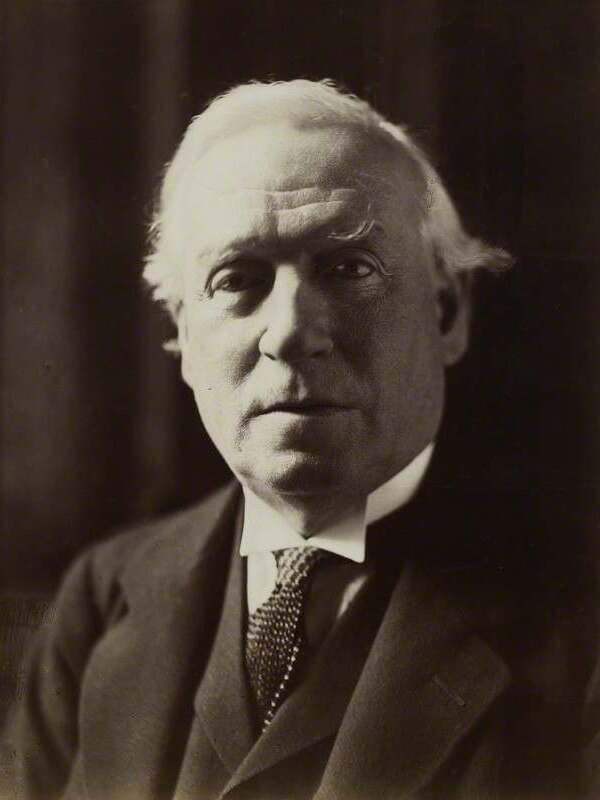
	First party	Second party
Leader	David Lloyd George	William Adamson
Party	National Liberal	Labour
Alliance	Coalition
Leader since	7 December 1916	24 October 1917
Leader's seat	Caernarvon Boroughs	West Fife
Last election	Did not contest	5 seats, (Note: Combined results for county, borough and university seats.) 17.8%
Seats won	18	9
Seat change	▲18	▲4
Popular vote	207,377 (Note: Total and percentage votes given here are for territorial constituencies only.)	163,055
Percentage	39.2%	30.8%
Swing	New party	▲13.0 pp
	Third party	Fourth party
Leader	Bonar Law	H. H. Asquith
Party	Conservative	Liberal
Alliance	Coalition
Leader since	13 November 1911	30 April 1908
Leader's seat	Glasgow; Central	East Fife (lost seat)
Last election	3 seats, 33.8% (Note: Combined results of the Conservative and Liberal Unionist Party in December 1910, which had since merged to the form the Conservative and Unionist party in 1912.)	26 seats, 47.9%
Seats won	4 (Note: Combined Coalition Conservative and non-Coalition Conservative results.)	3
Seat change	▲1	▼23
Popular vote	59,592	51,382
Percentage	11.3%	9.7%
Swing	▼22.5 pp	▼38.2 pp

On Wednesday 14 December 1918, the 1918 United Kingdom general election was held in Wales, to elect all 707 members of the House of Commons, with 36 constituencies being in Wales. 35 seats represented territorial constituencies contested under the first past the post electoral system, and one additional seat represented the University of Wales which was also contested under the first past the post electoral system.

The election was called immediately after the Armistice with Germany which ended the First World War, and was held on Saturday, 14 December 1918. The governing coalition, under Prime Minister David Lloyd George, sent letters of endorsement to candidates who supported the coalition government, these being primarily Conservatives and Unionists and Coalition Liberals. These were nicknamed "Coalition Coupons", and led to the election being known as the "coupon election".

It would be the last election at which the Liberal Party (or Liberals as a whole) would hold the majority or most seats or vote share in Wales.

== Electoral system ==
All constituencies contested under the first past the post electoral system. It was the first general election to be held after enactment of the Representation of the People Act 1918. It was the first election and all men over the age of 21 could vote. By extension, it was the first election in which women over the age of 30 could vote in elections, though with some qualifications of property ownership.

Under the post-war redistribution which was also under the provisions of the Representation of the People Act 1918, the number of constituencies in Wales was increased from the 34 used in elections between 1885 and December 1910, to a total of 36 at this election, and would remain so until 1950. Amongst the new constituencies, this was the first election in which the University of Wales had a constituency that returned members to the House of Commons. The constituency would exist until 1950, when it was abolished for that election.

== Candidates ==
Below is a table summarising the candidates of the 1918 general election in Wales, excluding those in the University of Wales constituency.

Affiliation	Candidates
Labour Party	25
Coalition Liberal	19
Liberal Party	10
Conservative and Unionist Party	8 (Note: The non-Coalition Conservative candidates that stood were James Childs Gould in Cardiff Central, Lord Colum Crichton-Stuart in Cardiff East, Herbert Cory in Cardiff South, Leolin Forestier-Walker in Monmouth, Arthur Seaton in Pontypridd and David Davies in Swansea West. The Coalition Conservative candidates that stood were William Cope in Llandaff and Barry and Leonard Wilkinson Llewelyn in Pontypool.)
Independent Labour	2 (Note: Candidate Owen Thomas stood in Anglesey and Robert Jones in Caernarvonshire.)
Independent	2 (Note: The candidates that stood were Austin Harrison in Caernarvon Boroughs and Charles Sixsmith in Llandaff and Barry.)
Coalition National Democratic	1 (Note: Candidate Charles Stanton stood in Aberdare.)
Independent Unionist	1 (Note: Candidate Robert Hughes stood in Cardiff Central.)
Independent Democratic	1 (Note: Candidate Bertie Pardoe-Thomas stood in Newport.)
Independent NFDDSS	1 (Note: Candidate T. G. Jones stood in Aberavon. Jones was only endorsed by the local branch of the NFDDSS.)
Christian Socialist	1 (Note: Candidate Griffith Bowen Thomas stood in Pembrokeshire.)
Total	71

== Analysis ==
=== Coalition Liberals and Liberal Party ===
Amongst the Liberal Parties, the Coalition Liberals (led by Prime Minister David Lloyd George gained a significant 18 seats. Aberavon, Brecon and Radnorshire, David Lloyd George's constituency of Caernarvon Boroughs, Caernarvonshire, Cardiganshire, Carmarthen, Denbigh, Flintshire, Llanelly, Merthyr, Neath, Newport, Pembrokeshire, Pontypridd, Swansea East, Swansea West and Wrexham. The Coalition Liberals also one the new single seat in the University of Wales, totaling 18 seats.

The Coalition Liberals held the greatest number of seats in Wales. It would be the last election in which the a Liberal Party would hold the greatest number (or indeed a majority) of seats in Wales. When combined with results from across the United Kingdom, the result was a massive landslide in favour of the coalition. This included the Coalition Liberals, the vast majority of Conservative MPs across the United Kingdom and the Coalition candidates of the National Democratic and Labour Party.

However, outside the Coalition, Liberal Party (led by H. H. Asquith), lost a total of 21 seats compared to the last election, primarily to the Coalition Liberals in the newly redistributed constituencies. However, the Liberals held Cardiff East, Merioneth, Montgomeryshire.

=== Coalition and non-Coalition Conservatives ===
The Conservative Party, which had formed in 1912 from the unification of the Conservatives and Liberal Unionists won seats at the election after fielding only eight candidates in total compared with it standing many more in previous elections. As a result, the party saw a drop of over 22.5% of the vote share in Wales, with the Coalition Conservatives not standing candidates against the Coalition Liberals, and non-Coalition Conservatives standing so few in number in Wales against Coalition Liberals.

Two candidates were sent coalition coupons, with one candidate, William Cope, winning the seat of Llandaff and Barry. Amongst the other six conservatives who did not receive Coalition Coupons, three were elected. Herbert Cory won Cardiff South, being a Conservative retention compared to the abolished Cardiff in the last election. Leolin Forestier-Walker gained Monmouth. Additionally, James Childs Gould, who also gained Cardiff Central, had received a Coalition Coupon, but it was revoked before the election.

However, Denbigh Boroughs was abolished after the redistribution, with Coalition Liberals retaining the two replacement seats that covered also covered the abolished constituency. The former Member of Parliament, William Ormsby-Gore, however, did move constituencies after being selected for Stafford at this election. The party also lost Montgomery, which had been abolished, within Montgomeryshire being retained by the Liberals. This were two losses for the Conservative Party.

As such, one Coupon Conservative won a seat, with three Conservatives winning without Coalition Coupons. This was an overall gain of one seat in Wales for the Conservatives combined compared with the last election. The non-Coalition Conservatives elected, along with the rest elected across the United Kingdom, did not form an opposition or bloc against the National Coalition, but were principally concerned with the issue of Irish independence.

=== Labour and other parties ===
The Labor Party won nine seats in Wales at the election, an increase of four seats compared with the previous election. Labour won Abertillery, Bedwellty, Caerphilly, Ebbw Vale, Gower, Ogmore, Pontypool, Rhondda East and Rhondda West.

In addition, Independent Labour candidate Owen Thomas won the seat of Anglesey, winning it from the long-standing MP Ellis Ellis-Griffith of the Liberal Party. Coalition National Democratic candidate Charles Stanton won the seat of Aberdare, a new seat which replaced one held by the Liberals in the last election. Stanton had previously held one of the two seats in the now abolished Merthyr Tydfil as an Independent Labour MP of after the 1915 Merthyr Tydfil by-election wherein he replaced Keir Hardie following Hardie's death.

== County and borough constituency results ==
Below is a table summarising the constituency results of the 1918 general election in Wales, excluding the result in the University of Wales constituency.

Party	Seats					Aggregate votes		
Party	Total	Gains	Losses	Net	Of total (%)	Total	Of total (%)	Change (%)
Coalition Government (Total)	22	New		▲19	62.9	289,793	54.8	New
Coalition Liberal	17	New		▲17	48.6	207,377	39.2	New
Conservative	4 (Note: Includes 3 non-Coalition Conservative MPs.)	3 (Note: Includes 2 non-Coalition Conservative MPs.)	2 (Note: Includes 2 non-Coalition Conservatives MPs.)	▲1 (Note: Includes +0 for non-Coalition Conservatives.)	11.4 (Note: Includes 8.6% for non-Coalition Conservatives.)	59,592 (Note: Includes 39,264 for non-Coalition Conservatives.)	11.3 (Note: Includes 7.4% for non-Coalition Conservatives.)	▼22.5
Coalition NDP	1	New		▲1	2.9	22,824	4.3	New
Labour	9	4	0	▲4	25.7	163,055	30.8	▲13.0
Liberal	3	0	23	▼23	8.6	51,382	9.7	▼38.2
Independent Labour	1 (Note: Owen Thomas in Anglesey.)	1	0	▲1	2.9	17,183	3.3	▲2.8
Ind. Unionist	0	New			—	3,419	0.7	New
Independent	0	Did not stand in Dec. 1910			—	2,634	0.5	—N/a
Independent Democratic	0	New			—	647	0.1	New
Christian Socialist	0	New			—	597	0.1	New
Independent NFDDSS	0	New			—	324	0.1	New
Total	35			▲1	100.0	529,034	100.0	0.0
Registered voters, and turnout						803,333 (Note: Electorate in contested constituencies. The total electorate was 1,170,974.)	65.9	▼12.4

=== Popular vote ===
Popular vote
Coalition Liberal	39.2%
Labour	30.8%
Conservative	11.3%
Liberal	9.7%
Coalition NDP	4.3%
Ind. Labour	3.3%
Other	1.4%

Popular vote (coalitions)
Coalition Gov.	54.8%
Labour	30.8%
Liberal	9.7%
Ind. Labour	3.3%
Other	1.4%

=== Parliament seats ===
Parliament seats
Coalition Liberal	48.6%
Labour	25.7%
Conservative	11.4%
Liberal	8.6%
Coalition NDP	2.9%
Ind. Labour	2.9%

Parliament seats (coalitions)
Coalition Gov.	62.9%
Labour	25.7%
Liberal	8.6%
Ind. Labour	2.9%

== University of Wales result ==
Below is a table summarising the 1918 constituency results for seat of the University of Wales constituency. The Coalition Liberals retaining the seat brought the party's total in Wales to 18 seats out of the possible 36.

General election 1918: University of Wales
Party		Candidate	Votes	%
C	National Liberal	Herbert Lewis	739	80.8
	Labour	Millicent Mackenzie	176	19.2
Majority			563	61.6
Turnout			915	85.8
	National Liberal win (new seat)			
C indicates candidate endorsed by the coalition government.

== See also ==
- 1918 United Kingdom general election in England
- 1918 United Kingdom general election in Ireland
- 1918 United Kingdom general election in Scotland
- List of United Kingdom Parliament constituencies (1885–1918) by region
- List of MPs for constituencies in Wales (1918–1922)
