= Irish Loyal and Patriotic Union =

Defunct unionist political party in 19th century Ireland

- Founded: May 1885; 141 years ago
- Dissolved: 1891; 135 years ago
- Succeeded by: Irish Unionist Alliance
- Headquarters: Dublin
- Newspaper: Notes from Ireland
- Ideology: Big tent Anti-Home Rule; Irish Unionism

The Irish Loyal and Patriotic Union (ILPU) was a unionist political organisation in Ireland, established to oppose the Irish Home Rule movement.

The Irish Loyal and Patriotic Union was formed in Dublin in May 1885 by a small number of southern businessmen, landowners and academics. It sought to unite Liberals and Conservatives in the three southern provinces of Ireland on a common platform of maintenance of the union between Great Britain and Ireland. In doing so, it undermined the Conservative Loyal Irish Union, which shut down as a result of the ILPU's founding. From its inception, the ILPU's main opponent was the Irish Parliamentary Party. The ILPU published pamphlets, leaflets and a news sheet, Notes from Ireland, which were distributed widely in Ireland. The organisation had some success in preventing rivalry between Liberals and Conservatives, and in a number of cases candidates came forward in the 1885 general election simply as ‘loyalists’. A total of 54 of the southern seats were contested by anti-home rule candidates.

The success of the organisation led its leaders to found the Irish Unionist Alliance in 1891, at which point the ILPU ceased to exist as a separate body.

== 1885 general election ==
Coloured purple are seats contested by the ILPU in the 1885 election. All were lost to the IPP. Constituencies coloured green were won by the IPP, and blue by the Conservatives.

Table shows results for candidates running under a purely "Loyalist" banner.

Constituency	Candidate	Votes	%	Position	Winning party
Mid Cork	Arthur St George Patton	106	2.1	2	Irish Parliamentary Party
North Donegal	Augustus Stewart	952	17.2	2	Irish Parliamentary Party
Galway Borough	Thomas George Palmer Hallett	164	10.9	2	Irish Parliamentary Party
South Kerry	Daniel O'Connell	133	4.6	2	Irish Parliamentary Party
East Waterford	Capt. William Gervaise de la Poer	314	8.7	2	Irish Parliamentary Party
South Westmeath	Herman Southwood Smith	200	5.2	2	Irish Parliamentary Party
