= Parliamentary franchise in the United Kingdom 1885–1918 =

The total registered electorate in the United Kingdom grew from 5.7 million in 1885 to over 21 million in 1918. Much of the growth was result of the Representation of the People Act 1918, which expanded franchise by abolishing property qualifications for men and introduced female suffrage for some women over the age of 30.

Changes in parliamentary franchise from 1885 to 1918 in the United Kingdom were the result of centuries of development in different kinds of constituencies. The three Reform Acts of the nineteenth century brought about some order by amending franchises in a uniform manner (see Reform Act 1832, Reform Act 1867 and Representation of the People Act 1884).

After 1885 the occupation franchise (under which most of the electors qualified in this period) was similar in all types of constituency, throughout the United Kingdom, but there were some surviving ownership and reserved Borough franchises which applied differently in particular seats.

The major distinction was between county constituencies and borough constituencies. All county constituencies had the same mix of franchises. Some of the older boroughs were still affected by the different franchises that had applied to them before 1832 (see the Unreformed House of Commons for details of the position before the Reform Act 1832). The Reform Acts had preserved some of the unreformed borough franchises, as well as introducing new rules for all boroughs.

The contents of the section on the parliamentary franchise below, are taken from The Constitutional Year Book 1900, a publication issued by Conservative Central Office in 1900 and thus out of copyright. They were intended to guide Conservative agents and other activists, so can be assumed to be an accurate summary of the law for the period 1885-1918, between the implementation of the Representation of the People Act 1884 and the coming into force of the Representation of the People Act 1918.

The exact period when this pattern of franchises applied was between the dissolution of the 22nd Parliament of the United Kingdom (18 November 1885) and that of the 30th Parliament (25 November 1918). Note that the local government franchise was different; in particular, single women ratepayers could vote in municipal elections from 1869 following the Municipal Franchise Act 1869, confirmed and extended to some married women by the Local Government Act 1894.

== Numbers enfranchised ==
The first table below shows the total registered electorate (including university electors), between the 1880 general election (the last election before the Representation of the People Act 1884) and the 1918 general election (the first after that act was replaced by the Representation of the People Act 1918).

The increase in Ireland between 1880 and 1885 was particularly significant, as the Irish county franchise was brought into line with that in Great Britain.

The 1885 general election and the 1886 general election were fought on the same register.

The January 1910 and December 1910 general elections were fought on the same register, except in Scotland. The voters in the second election differed from the 1910 figures in the table with Scotland 779,012 and Universities 46,566 contributing to a total of 7,709,981 registered voters.

Country	1880	1885	1892	1895	1900	1906	1910	1918
England	2,338,809	4,094,674	4,478,524	4,620,320	4,929,485	5,416,537	5,774,892	16,021,600
Wales	149,841	282,242	314,647	322,784	340,290	387,535	425,744	1,170,974
Scotland	293,581	560,580	589,520	616,178	661,748	728,725	762,184	2,205,383
Ireland	229,204	737,965	740,536	732,046	757,849	686,661	683,767	1,926,274
Universities	28,615	32,569	37,314	39,191	41,563	45,150	48,154	68,091
Total	3,040,050	5,708,030	6,160,541	6,330,519	6,730,935	7,264,608	7,694,741	21,392,322

Source: Adapted from Craig (1989).

The table below provides figures (taken from Parliamentary Papers in 1886 and 1902) for those qualified by various franchises, in England and Wales, after the 1884 reforms and again in 1902.

Qualification	1885	1902
Occupation voters in counties	2,020,650	2,570,928
Occupation voters in boroughs	1,749,441	2,229,381
Ownership voters in counties	508,554	493,694
Lodgers in boroughs	57,684	93,421
Ancient right voters in boroughs	35,066	26,038
Lodgers in counties	8,937	32,894

Source: Adapted from Seymour (1970).

By comparison when universal manhood suffrage was introduced for the 1918 general election, there were 12,913,166 registered male electors in the United Kingdom (including University electors), as opposed to the registration at the December 1910 general election of 7,709,981 (again including University electors).

The available figures suggest that the 1885-1918 electorate comprised about sixty per cent of the adult male population.

== The parliamentary franchise ==
The following are the classes of persons who, being males of full age, are entitled to be registered, and when registered to vote at Parliamentary Elections, provided they are not under any legal incapacity, such as alienage or conviction for corrupt practices, and have not within 12 months preceding 15 July received parochial relief (other than medical relief) or other disqualifying alms:-

=== Counties ===
==== Ownership franchise ====
===== Freeholders =====
(1) Persons possessed in fee simple or fee tail of a freehold estate in land or tenements of the annual value of 40s.

(2) Persons possessed of a freehold estate for life or lives in land or tenements of the annual value of 40s. who actually or bona fide occupy the premises or were seised of such estate on 7 June 1832, or have acquired such estate after that day by marriage, marriage settlement, devise, or promotion to a benefice or office.

Persons possessed of a freehold estate for life or lives in lands or tenements of the clear yearly value of £5.

Note.-Residence on the property is not required from freeholders. A freehold situate in a Parliamentary borough qualifies the owner for the county vote, unless it is in his own occupation. See also N.B. below.

===== Copyholders =====
Persons possessed of an estate for life or lives in land or tenements of copyhold or any other tenure of the clear yearly value of £5. Note.-Residence on the property is not required from copyholders. A copyhold situate in a Parliamentary borough does not qualify the owner for the county vote if it would qualify him or any other person (i.e., his tenant) for the borough vote. See also N.B. below.

===== Leaseholders =====
Lessees, their assignees, and sub-lessees (if in actual occupation) of a term originally created for not less than 60 years, of the value of £5 per annum. Not less than 20 years of the value of £50 per annum.

Note.-Residence on the property is not required from leaseholders. A leasehold situate in a Parliamentary borough does not qualify the owner for the county vote if it would qualify him or any other person (i.e., his tenant) for the borough vote. See also N.B. below.

N.B.-Joint Ownership. - One only of several joint owners can claim a vote, unless they have acquired the property by inheritance, marriage, or will, or are bona fide carrying on business thereon as partners, in which case all can claim votes if the value is sufficient.

Possession. - The claimant must have been in actual possession or in receipt of the rents and profits for his own use for 6 months (in the case of (c) leaseholders, 12 months) preceding 15 July, unless the property has been acquired by descent, marriage or will.

Rentcharge. - A rentcharge does not now qualify to vote, except the whole of the tithe rentcharge of a living; but a person registered before 1885 retains his vote.

Claims - Freeholders, Copyholders and Leaseholders in order to obtain a vote must, if not already registered, send in a notice of claim to the Overseers of the Parish in which the property is situated on or before 20 July.

==== Occupation franchise ====
===== £10 occupiers =====
The occupier as owner or tenant for 12 months preceding 15 July in any year of any land or tenement within the county of a clear yearly value of not less than £10.

Note - The word "tenement" includes a warehouse, counting-house, shop, or any part of a house separately occupied for the purpose of any business, trade or profession. Such part may be described in claims as "offices," "chambers," "studios," or by any other applicable term. Sole occupation of one part will qualify, although another part may be occupied jointly. "Residence" on the qualification is not required from £10 occupiers.

Joint Occupation. - Only two joint occupiers under the £10 qualification can be registered, unless they derive the property by inheritance, marriage, or will, or are bona-fide engaged in carrying on business as partners. See also N.B. below.

===== Householders =====
The inhabitant occupier as owner or tenant for 12 months preceding 15 July in any year of any dwelling-house within the county.

Note - A "dwelling-house" includes, for the purposes of the franchise, any "part of a house which is separately occupied as a dwelling," and where the landlord lets out the whole of the house in apartments, retaining no control. A single room may thus be considered a dwelling-house. Sole occupation of one "part of a house" qualifies, notwithstanding joint occupation of another part. Residence is required. Joint occupation under this head confers no qualification. A man does not lose his vote by letting his house furnished during a part of the qualifying period not exceeding 4 months in the whole.

The Service Franchise. - Any man who himself inhabits a dwelling-house (as above defined) by virtue of any office, service, or employment, is entitled to a vote in respect of the same, provided that the person under whom he serves does not inhabit the house. The overseers are bound to place the names of all such upon the rate-book as inhabitant householders, notwithstanding that the rent or rates may be paid by their employer. See also N.B. below.

N.B.- Occupation of premises in a Parliamentary borough cannot qualify to vote for the county.

Successive Occupation. - If two or more premises in the same division of a county, or in the same county if it is undivided, are occupied in immediate succession, the vote is not thereby lost. If the occupier is omitted from the list, a claim should be sent to the overseer by 20 August, giving particulars of all the premises so occupied.

Poor Rates. - The occupier must have been rated in respect of the premises to all poor rates made during the qualifying period. All poor rates due on 5 January must have been paid on or before 20 July. If the owner is liable for the rates, and has not paid them, the tenant may pay them, and deduct the amount from the rent. Wherever the landlord pays the rates, the overseers are bound to insert the occupier's name in the rate-book.

Claims. - The names of qualified householders and occupiers must be placed by the overseers on the list published by them on 1 August. No claim is necessary in their case, but if any names are omitted by the overseers, a notice of claim must be sent on or before 20 August.

==== Lodgers ====
The inhabitant occupier, for the 12 months preceding 15 July in any year of lodgings in the same house within the county (or division) of the clear yearly value, if let unfurnished, of £10 or upwards.

Note. - The term "lodgings" comprises any apartment or place of residence, whether furnished or unfurnished, in a dwelling-house, where the landlord resides and retains control over the passages and outer doors.

Residence is required.

Joint Occupation. - The inhabitant occupier, jointly with others, of lodgings of such clear yearly value, if let unfurnished, as gives a sum of not less than £10 for each occupier is entitled to claim a vote; but no more than two such joint occupiers may be registered in respect of one set of lodgings.

Occupation of lodgings in a Parliamentary borough cannot qualify to vote for a county.

The occupation in immediate succession of different lodgings of sufficient value in the same house will qualify. But removal from one house to another disqualifies for the year.

Additional rooms may be taken during the year without vitiating the qualification.

Claims. - Lodgers not already registered must send to the overseers claims to vote on or before 20 August. Those already registered must renew their claims yearly, on or before 25 July.

=== Boroughs ===
==== Reserved rights ====
Persons possessing rights permanently or temporarily reserved by the Reform Act of 1832, such as

(1) Freeholders and burgage tenants in cities and towns which are counties of themselves; e.g., Bristol, Exeter, Norwich, and Nottingham.

(2) Freemen and burgesses by servitude (except in London).

Freemen and liverymen in the City of London.

Inhabitants, inhabitant householders, inhabitants paying scot and lot, potwallers. (These rights are now merged in the occupation franchise.)

==== Occupation franchise ====
===== £10 occupiers =====
The occupier as owner or tenant for 12 months preceding 15 July in any year of any land or tenement within the borough of a clear yearly value of not less than £10.

Note - The word "tenement" includes a warehouse, counting-house, shop, or any part of a house separately occupied for the purpose of any business, trade or profession. Such part may be described in claims as "offices," "chambers," "studios," or by any other applicable term. Sole occupation of one part will qualify, although another part may be occupied jointly.

The voter must have resided in the borough or within 7 miles (City of London 25 miles) of its boundary for the 6 months preceding 15 July.

Joint Occupation qualifies all the joint occupiers wherever the clear yearly value is enough to give a sum of £10 for each occupier.

Assessed Taxes. - The occupier must also have paid on or before 20 July all assessed taxes due in respect of the premises up to 5 January. See also N.B., post.

===== Householders =====
The inhabitant occupier as owner or tenant for 12 months preceding 15 July in any year of any dwelling-house within the borough.

Note - A "dwelling-house" includes, for the purposes of the franchise, any "part of a house which is separately occupied as a dwelling," and where the landlord lets out the whole of the house in apartments, retaining no control. A single room may thus be considered a dwelling-house. Sole occupation of one "part of a house" qualifies, notwithstanding joint occupation of another part. Residence is required. Joint occupation under this head confers no qualification. A man does not lose his vote by letting his house furnished during a part of the qualifying period not exceeding 4 months in the whole.

The Service Franchise.* - Any man who himself inhabits a dwelling-house (as above defined) by virtue of any office, service, or employment, is entitled to a vote in respect of the same, provided that the person under whom he serves does not inhabit the house. The overseers are bound to place the names of all such upon the rate-book as inhabitant householders, notwithstanding that the rent or rates may be paid by their employer. See also N.B. below.

N.B.- Successive Occupation. - If two or more premises in the same borough (whether in the same division or not is immaterial) are occupied in immediate succession, the vote is not thereby lost. If the occupier is omitted from the list, a claim should be sent to the overseer by 20 August, giving particulars of all the premises so occupied.

Poor Rates. - The occupier must have been rated in respect of the premises to all poor rates made during the qualifying period. All poor rates due on 5 January must have been paid on or before 20 July. If the owner is liable for the rates, and has not paid them, the tenant may pay them, and deduct the amount from the rent. Wherever the landlord pays the rates, the overseers are bound to insert the occupier's name in the rate-book.

Claims. - The names of qualified householders and occupiers must be placed by the overseers on the list published by them on 1 August. No claim is necessary in their casem but if any names are omitted by the overseers, a notice of claim must be sent on or before 20 August.

==== Lodgers ====
The inhabitant occupier, for the 12 months preceding 15 July in any year of lodgings in the same house within the borough, of the clear yearly value, if let unfurnished, of £10 or upwards.

Note. - The term "lodgings" comprises any apartment or place of residence, whether furnished or unfurnished, in a dwelling-house, where the landlord resides and retains control over the passages and outer doors.

Residence is required.

Joint Occupation. - The inhabitant occupier, jointly with others, of lodgings of such clear yearly value, if let unfurnished, as gives a sum of not less than £10 for each occupier is entitled to claim a vote; but no more than two such joint occupiers may be registered in respect of one set of lodgings.

The occupation in immediate succession of different lodgings of sufficient value in the same house will qualify. But removal from one house to another disqualifies for the year.

Additional rooms may be taken during the year without vitiating the qualification.

Claims. - Lodgers not already registered must send to the overseers claims to vote on or before 20 August. Those already registered must renew their claims yearly, on or before 25 July.

== See also ==
- Elections in the United Kingdom
- Electoral reform in the United Kingdom
- List of parliaments of the United Kingdom
- Duration of English, British and United Kingdom parliaments from 1660
- List of parliamentary boroughs and associated county constituencies 1832–1918
- Reform Acts
- Representation of the People Act
- Unreformed House of Commons
