= 1852 Manchester Borough Council election =

Local election in Manchester

- 1 November 1852

16 of 64 seats to Manchester Borough Council 33 seats needed for a majority

Elections to Manchester Borough Council were held on Monday, 1 November 1852. One third of the councillors seats were up for election, with each successful candidate to serve a three-year term of office.

== Ward results ==
=== All Saints' ===
All Saints'
Party	Candidate	Votes	%	±%
Conservative	Martin Middleton*	uncontested		
Conservative hold		Swing		

=== Ardwick ===
Ardwick
Party	Candidate	Votes	%	±%
Conservative	William Jones*	uncontested		
Conservative hold		Swing		

=== Cheetham ===
Cheetham
Party	Candidate	Votes	%	±%
Liberal	Robert Neill	uncontested		
Liberal gain from Conservative		Swing		

=== Collegiate Church ===
Collegiate Church
Party	Candidate	Votes	%	±%
Liberal	Abel Heywood*	512	71.2	N/A
Conservative	James Collinge	207	28.8	N/A
Majority		305	42.4	N/A
Turnout		719		
Liberal hold		Swing		

=== Exchange ===
Exchange
Party	Candidate	Votes	%	±%
Liberal	William Medcalf*	uncontested		
Liberal hold		Swing		

=== Medlock Street ===
Medlock Street
Party	Candidate	Votes	%	±%
Ratepayers	William Cottrell*	uncontested		
Ratepayers hold		Swing		

=== New Cross ===
New Cross
Party	Candidate	Votes	%	±%
Conservative	Joseph Lamb*	314	59.1	N/A
Conservative	Francis Parnell	296	55.7	N/A
Liberal	James Hampson	257	48.4	N/A
Liberal	J. R. Horner	195	36.7	N/A
Majority		39	7.3	N/A
Turnout		531		
Conservative hold		Swing		
Conservative gain from		Swing		

=== Oxford ===
Oxford
Party	Candidate	Votes	%	±%
Liberal	Joseph Adshead*	uncontested		
Liberal hold		Swing		

=== St. Ann's ===
St. Ann's
Party	Candidate	Votes	%	±%
Liberal	Samuel Phillips Hitchcock*	371	61.0	N/A
Conservative	Henry Hewitt	237	39.0	N/A
Majority		134	22.0	N/A
Turnout		608		
Liberal hold		Swing		

=== St. Clement's ===
St. Clement's
Party	Candidate	Votes	%	±%
	James Ainsworth*	uncontested		
		Swing		

=== St. George's ===
St. George's
Party	Candidate	Votes	%	±%
Liberal	Richard Aspden	302	65.7	
Conservative	William Oman	158	34.3	
Majority		144	31.4	
Turnout		460		
Liberal gain from		Swing		

=== St. James' ===
St. James'
Party	Candidate	Votes	%	±%
Liberal	William Hyde Lamb*	uncontested		
Liberal hold		Swing		

=== St. John's ===
St. John's
Party	Candidate	Votes	%	±%
Liberal	Alexander McDougall	uncontested		
Liberal gain from Ratepayers		Swing		

=== St. Luke's ===
St. Luke's
Party	Candidate	Votes	%	±%
	Joseph Simpson*	uncontested		
		Swing		

=== St. Michael's ===
St. Michael's
Party	Candidate	Votes	%	±%
Liberal	William Arnold McGill	252	53.3	N/A
Conservative	Robert Slack	221	46.7	N/A
Majority		31	6.6	N/A
Turnout		473		
Liberal gain from		Swing		
