= 1855 Manchester City Council election =

Local election in Manchester

- 1 November 1855

16 of 64 seats to Manchester City Council 33 seats needed for a majority

Elections to Manchester City Council were held on Thursday, 1 November 1855. One third of the councillors seats were up for election, with each successful candidate to serve a three-year term of office.

== Ward results ==
=== All Saints' ===
All Saints'
Party	Candidate	Votes	%	±%
Conservative	Martin Middleton*	uncontested		
Conservative hold		Swing		

=== Ardwick ===
Ardwick
Party	Candidate	Votes	%	±%
Conservative	William Jones*	135	88.2	N/A
Liberal	Charles Woolfenden	18	11.8	N/A
Majority		117	76.4	N/A
Turnout		153		
Conservative hold		Swing		

=== Cheetham ===
Cheetham
Party	Candidate	Votes	%	±%
Liberal	Robert Neill*	uncontested		
Liberal hold		Swing		

=== Collegiate Church ===
Collegiate Church
Party	Candidate	Votes	%	±%
Liberal	Thomas Wilson Dyson	463	55.3	N/A
Conservative	Peter Royle	374	44.7	N/A
Majority		89	10.6	N/A
Turnout		837		
Liberal hold		Swing		

=== Exchange ===
Exchange
Party	Candidate	Votes	%	±%
Liberal	William Mountcastle	335	55.3	N/A
Liberal	James Belfield	271	44.7	N/A
Majority		64	10.6	
Turnout		606		
Liberal hold		Swing		

=== Medlock Street ===
Medlock Street
Party	Candidate	Votes	%	±%
Ratepayers	William Cottrell*	uncontested		
Ratepayers hold		Swing		

=== New Cross ===
New Cross
Party	Candidate	Votes	%	±%
Conservative	Joseph Lamb*	uncontested		
Conservative	Francis Parnell*	uncontested		
Conservative hold		Swing		
Conservative hold		Swing		

=== Oxford ===
Oxford
Party	Candidate	Votes	%	±%
Liberal	Joseph Adshead*	uncontested		
Liberal hold		Swing		

=== St. Ann's ===
St. Ann's
Party	Candidate	Votes	%	±%
	Francis Robinson*	uncontested		
		Swing		

=== St. Clement's ===
St. Clement's
Party	Candidate	Votes	%	±%
	John Hetherington	uncontested		
		Swing		

=== St. George's ===
St. George's
Party	Candidate	Votes	%	±%
Liberal	Richard Aspden*	uncontested		
Liberal hold		Swing		

=== St. James' ===
St. James'
Party	Candidate	Votes	%	±%
Liberal	William Hyde Lamb*	uncontested		
Liberal hold		Swing		

=== St. John's ===
St. John's
Party	Candidate	Votes	%	±%
Liberal	Alexander McDougall*	206	56.1	N/A
Conservative	Matthew Brougham	161	43.9	N/A
Majority		45	12.2	N/A
Turnout		367		
Liberal hold		Swing		

=== St. Luke's ===
St. Luke's
Party	Candidate	Votes	%	±%
	Joseph Simpson*	uncontested		
		Swing		

=== St. Michael's ===
St. Michael's
Party	Candidate	Votes	%	±%
Liberal	William Arnold McGill*	uncontested		
Liberal hold		Swing		
