= George Clay =

George Clay may refer to:

- Sir George Clay, 3rd Baronet (1831–1878), of the Clay baronets
- Sir George Felix Neville Clay, 5th Baronet (1871–1941), of the Clay baronets
- George H. Clay (1911–1995), president of the Federal Reserve Bank of Kansas City, 1961–1976

== See also ==
- George Clay Ginty (1840–1890), politician, military officer, newspaperman, and U.S. Marshal
