= 1869 Tower Hamlets by-election =

UK Parliamentary by-election

The 1869 Tower Hamlets by-election was fought on 8 November 1869. The by-election was fought due to the incumbent Liberal MP Acton Smee Ayrton becoming First Commissioner of Works. It was retained by Acton Smee Ayrton who was unopposed.
