= 1858 Manchester City Council election =

Local election in Manchester

- 1 November 1858

17 of 64 seats to Manchester City Council 33 seats needed for a majority

Elections to Manchester City Council were held on Monday, 1 November 1858. One third of the councillors seats were up for election, with each successful candidate to serve a three-year term of office.

== Ward results ==
=== All Saints' ===
All Saints'
Party	Candidate	Votes	%	±%
Conservative	Richard Whitwell Coates*	uncontested		
Conservative hold		Swing		

=== Ardwick ===
Ardwick
Party	Candidate	Votes	%	±%
Conservative	William Jones*	uncontested		
Conservative hold		Swing		

=== Cheetham ===
Cheetham
Party	Candidate	Votes	%	±%
Liberal	Robert Neill*	uncontested		
Liberal hold		Swing		

=== Collegiate Church ===
Collegiate Church
Party	Candidate	Votes	%	±%
Liberal	Thomas Wilson Dyson*	uncontested		
Liberal hold		Swing		

=== Exchange ===
Exchange
Party	Candidate	Votes	%	±%
Liberal	Henry Ogden	308	54.4	N/A
Liberal	William Mountcastle*	258	45.6	N/A
Majority		50	8.8	N/A
Turnout		566		
Liberal gain from Liberal		Swing		

=== Medlock Street ===
Medlock Street
Party	Candidate	Votes	%	±%
Ratepayers	William Cottrell*	uncontested		
Ratepayers hold		Swing		

=== New Cross ===
New Cross
Party	Candidate	Votes	%	±%
Conservative	Peter Royle	388	57.3	+4.4
Conservative	Joseph Lamb*	327	48.3	−4.6
Conservative	James Redfern	251	37.1	−15.8
Majority		76	11.2	+2.9
Turnout		677		
Conservative hold		Swing		
Conservative hold		Swing		

=== Oxford ===
Oxford (2 vacancies)
Party	Candidate	Votes	%	±%
Liberal	Joseph Adshead*	uncontested		
	Robert Adeane Barlow	uncontested		
Liberal hold		Swing		
		Swing		

=== St. Ann's ===
St. Ann's
Party	Candidate	Votes	%	±%
	Francis Robinson*	uncontested		
		Swing		

=== St. Clement's ===
St. Clement's
Party	Candidate	Votes	%	±%
Liberal	Edward Groome*	uncontested		
Liberal hold		Swing		

=== St. George's ===
St. George's
Party	Candidate	Votes	%	±%
Liberal	Richard Aspden*	uncontested		
Liberal hold		Swing		

=== St. James' ===
St. James'
Party	Candidate	Votes	%	±%
Liberal	William Hyde Lamb*	uncontested		
Liberal hold		Swing		

=== St. John's ===
St. John's
Party	Candidate	Votes	%	±%
Liberal	Alexander McDougall*	uncontested		
Liberal hold		Swing		

=== St. Luke's ===
St. Luke's
Party	Candidate	Votes	%	±%
	Joseph Simpson*	uncontested		
		Swing		

=== St. Michael's ===
St. Michael's
Party	Candidate	Votes	%	±%
Liberal	William Arnold McGill*	uncontested		
Liberal hold		Swing		
