= Charles Ritchie, 1st Baron Ritchie of Dundee =

British politician (1838–1906)

The Right Honourable The Lord Ritchie of Dundee PC
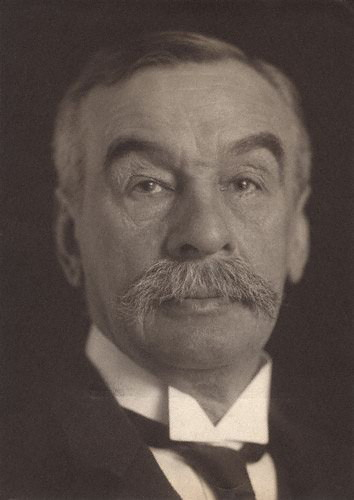
- Ritchie, 1902–1903

Chancellor of the Exchequer
- In office 11 August 1902 – 9 October 1903
- Monarch: Edward VII
- Prime Minister: Arthur Balfour
- Preceded by: Michael Hicks Beach
- Succeeded by: Austen Chamberlain

Home Secretary
- In office 12 November 1900 – 11 August 1902
- Monarchs: Victoria; Edward VII
- Prime Minister: Robert Gascoyne-Cecil; Arthur Balfour
- Preceded by: Sir Matthew White Ridley, Bt
- Succeeded by: Aretas Akers-Douglas

President of the Board of Trade
- In office 29 June 1895 – 12 November 1900
- Monarch: Victoria
- Prime Minister: Robert Gascoyne-Cecil
- Preceded by: James Bryce
- Succeeded by: Gerald Balfour

President of the Local Government Board
- In office 3 August 1886 – 11 August 1892
- Prime Minister: Robert Gascoyne-Cecil
- Preceded by: James Stansfeld
- Succeeded by: Henry Fowler

Parliamentary Secretary to the Admiralty
- In office 1 July 1885 – 28 January 1886
- Prime Minister: Robert Gascoyne-Cecil
- Preceded by: Thomas Brassey
- Succeeded by: J. T. Hibbert

Member of Parliament for Croydon
- In office 24 May 1895 – 22 December 1905
- Preceded by: Sidney Herbert
- Succeeded by: H. O. Arnold-Forster

Member of Parliament for St George Tower Hamlets (1874–1885)
- In office 17 February 1874 – 26 July 1892
- Preceded by: Acton Smee Ayrton
- Succeeded by: John Benn

Personal details
- Born: Charles Thomson Ritchie; 19 November 1838 Dundee, Scotland, UK
- Died: 9 January 1906 (aged 67) Biarritz, Nouvelle-Aquitaine, France
- Resting place: Kensal Green Cemetery, London, England, UK
- Party: Conservative
- Spouse: Margaret Ower
- Children: 10
- Parents: William Ritchie (father); Elizabeth Thomson (mother)
- Relatives: James Ritchie (brother)
- Education: City of London School

Charles Thomson Ritchie, 1st Baron Ritchie of Dundee, PC (19 November 1838 – 9 January 1906) was a Scottish businessman and Conservative politician who sat in the House of Commons from 1874 until 1905 when he was raised to the peerage. He served as Home Secretary from 1900 to 1902 and as Chancellor of the Exchequer from 1902 to 1903.

== Background and education ==
Ritchie was born at Dundee, Scotland, the third son of Elizabeth (née Thomson), daughter of James Thomson, and William Ritchie, of Rockhill near Broughty Ferry, Forfarshire. His father was head of the firm of William Ritchie & Sons, of London and Dundee, East India merchants, jute spinners and manufacturers. The Ritchie family had long been connected with the town of Dundee. His elder brother James Thomson Ritchie was Lord Mayor of London from 1903 to 1904 and was created a Baronet in 1903 (a title which became extinct on his death). Ritchie was educated at the City of London School, after which he went into the family business.

On 7 December 1858, he married Margaret Ower, daughter of Thomas Ower of Perth with whom he had three sons and seven daughters.

== Political career ==
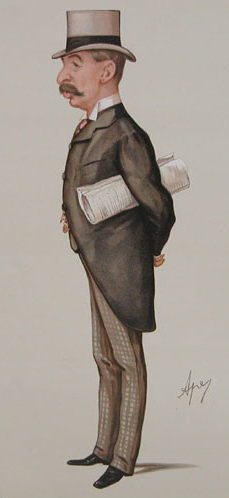
Caricature of Charles Thomson Ritchie by Carlo Pellegrini.

In 1874, he was returned to parliament as Conservative member for the Tower Hamlets. In 1885, he was made secretary to the Admiralty, and from 1886 to 1892 was President of the Local Government Board in Lord Salisbury's second administration, sitting as member for St George in the East. He was responsible for the Local Government Act 1888, instituting county councils; and a large section of the Conservative party always owed him a grudge for having originated the London County Council.

In Lord Salisbury's later ministries, as member for Croydon (1895–1906), he was President of the Board of Trade (1895–1900) and Home Secretary (1900–1902); and when Sir Michael Hicks-Beach retired in August 1902, he became Chancellor of the Exchequer in Balfour's cabinet. In his earlier years he had been a fair-trader and he was strongly opposed to Colonial Secretary Joseph Chamberlain's movement for a preferential tariff, leading to his sacking by Balfour in September 1903. Ritchie's son in law, the Scottish architect Mervyn Macartney, built a country house for Ritchie, Welders House, in the Buckinghamshire village of Jordans.

On 22 December 1905, he was created a peer as Baron Ritchie of Dundee, of Welders in the Parish of Chalfont St Giles in the County of Buckingham. However, he was in ill-health, and died at Biarritz, France in January 1906. He is buried at Kensal Green Cemetery, London. He was succeeded in the title by his second son, Charles.

Ritchie was elected as Rector of the University of Aberdeen in late October 1902, taking up the position the following month, serving for three years until November 1905.

== Arms ==
Coat of arms of Charles Ritchie, 1st Baron Ritchie of Dundee
Crest Out of an Eastern Crown Or a Unicorn's Head Argent armed of the first and charged on the neck with an Anchor Sable Escutcheon Argent an Anchor Sable on a Chief of the last three Lions' Heads erased of the first Supporters On either side an Unicorn Gules gorged with an Eastern Crown Or the dexter charged on the shoulder with a Purse Or and the sinister with a Balance also Or Motto Virtute Acquiritur Honos (Honour is acquired by virtue)

== Notes ==
Parliament of the United Kingdom
Preceded by Joseph d'Aguilar Samuda; Acton Smee Ayrton	Member of Parliament for Tower Hamlets; 1874–1885; With: Joseph d'Aguilar Samuda (1874–1880); James Bryce (1880–1885)	Constituency abolished
New constituency	Member of Parliament for Tower Hamlets, St George; 1885–1892	Succeeded by John Benn
Preceded by Sidney Herbert	Member of Parliament for Croydon; 1895–1905	Succeeded by H. O. Arnold-Forster
Political offices
Preceded by Thomas Brassey	Parliamentary Secretary to the Admiralty; 1885–1886	Succeeded by J. T. Hibbert
Preceded by James Stansfeld	President of the Local Government Board; 1886–1892	Succeeded by Henry Fowler
Preceded by James Bryce	President of the Board of Trade; 1895–1900	Succeeded by Gerald Balfour
Preceded by Sir Matthew Ridley	Home Secretary; 1900–1902	Succeeded by Aretas Akers-Douglas
Preceded by Sir Michael Hicks Beach	Chancellor of the Exchequer; 1902–1903	Succeeded by Austen Chamberlain
Academic offices
Preceded by The Lord Strathcona and Mount Royal	Rector of the University of Aberdeen; 1902–1905	Succeeded by Sir Frederick Treves
Peerage of the United Kingdom
New creation	Baron Ritchie of Dundee; 1905–1906	Succeeded by Charles Ritchie
