= Henry Gardiner Adams =

Henry Gardiner Adams (c. 1811 – 1881) was an English druggist and chemist, known as an author and anthologist. He wrote juvenile literature under the pseudonym Nemo.

== Life ==
Adams acted as secretary to the Mechanics Institute at Chatham. He was also involved in the early days of the Percy Society. Bankruptcy proceedings against his druggist and chemist business in Burgate Street, Canterbury were announced in 1872. He died at Gillingham, Kent on 1 May 1881.

== Political views ==
In 1854 Adams edited the book God's Image in Ebony by the British abolitionists Frederick Chesson and Wilson Armistead. In the introduction to God's Image in Ebony, Adams argued that all human beings had a common origin, and hence that the enslavement of black people was immoral.

== Edited works ==
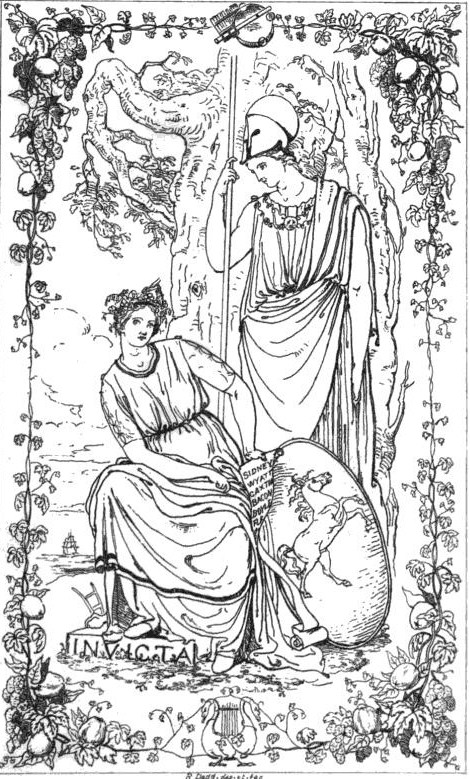
The Kentish Coronal, frontispiece etching by Richard Dadd

- The Kentish Coronal (1841). Adams contacted Charles Dickens in 1840 about contributing to a Kentish journal, but Dickens declined. Arthur Brook (John Chalk Claris) did contribute.
- Flowers; their moral, language, and poetry (1844)
- The Peace Reading-book (1844)
- The Language and Poetry of Flowers (1853 and later editions, US editions from 1844). This anthology was Christian in tone, and aimed at a female audience.
- A Cyclopædia of Poetical Quotations (1853)
- A Cyclopædia of Sacred Poetical Quotations (1854)
- God's Image in Ebony: Being a Series of Biographical Sketches, Facts, Anecdotes, Etc., Demonstrative of the Mental Powers and Intellectual Capacities of the Negro Race (1854), by Frederick William Chesson and Wilson Armistead
- A Cyclopædia of Female Biography (1857), revised edition, with Sarah Josepha Buell Hale

== Natural history ==
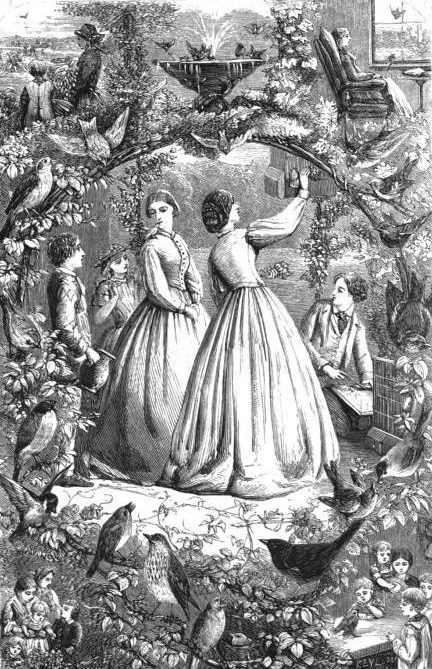
Frontispiece to Favorite Song Birds

- Favorite Song Birds (1851)
- Cage and Chamber Birds (1853), translated and expanded from the German, and including British Warblers by Robert Sweet
- Nests and Eggs of Familiar British Birds (1854) and Second series
- Beautiful Butterflies; the British species described and illustrated (1854)
- Beautiful Shells (1855)
- Humming Birds Described and Illustrated (1856)
- The Sea-side Lesson Book (1856)
- The Wild Flowers, Birds and Insects of the Months (1862)
- The Smaller British Birds (1874), with Henry B. Adams.

== Other works ==
- A Story of the Seasons (2nd edition 1855)
- Peace Lyrics (1856) dedicated to Elihu Burritt
- An Historical and Descriptive Account of Rochester Bridge (1856)
- The Weaver Boy who Became a Missionary: Being the Story of the Life and Labors of David Livingstone (1867)
