= St George (UK Parliament constituency) =

Parliamentary constituency in the United Kingdom, 1885–1918

- Former borough constituency for the House of Commons

1885–1918
- Seats: one
- Created from: Tower Hamlets
- Replaced by: Whitechapel and St George's

St George was a parliamentary constituency in what is now the London Borough of Tower Hamlets. It was part of the Parliamentary borough of Tower Hamlets and returned one Member of Parliament (MP) to the House of Commons of the Parliament of the United Kingdom.

== History ==
The constituency, formally known as Tower Hamlets, St George Division, was created by the Redistribution of Seats Act 1885 by the division of the existing two-member parliamentary borough of Tower Hamlets into seven divisions, each returning one MP.

This was an area on the north bank of the River Thames, with a lot of its inhabitants employed as dock workers or in the sugar refining industry. Pelling comments that it had the largest proportion of immigrant Irishmen in the metropolis.

The constituency was marginal between the Conservative and Liberal parties. Pelling suggests the Conservative MP, elected in 1885, owed his victory to generosity "bordering on corruption". Political issues important in the area were protectionism (as sugar refining was damaged by foreign subsidies to rivals) and the immigration of "pauper aliens" (the neighbouring division of Whitechapel had a large population of immigrant Jews).

The seat was abolished for the 1918 general election. The area was incorporated in a new seat of Stepney, Whitechapel and St George's.

== Boundaries ==
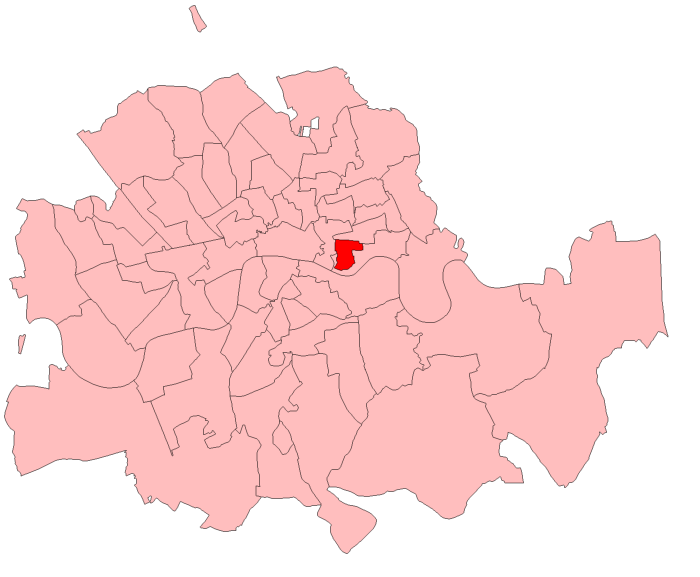
St George in London, 1885-1918

The constituency comprised two civil parishes: St George in the East and Wapping, taking its name from the former and so ultimately from St George in the East church in contrast to the St George's Hanover Square constituency in Westminster. Although lying in Middlesex, the parishes formed part of the East End of London, and were administered as part of the Metropolis.

In 1889 the area was removed from Middlesex to the new County of London, and in 1900 it was included in the Metropolitan Borough of Stepney, but no changes were made to constituency boundaries until 1918.

== Members of Parliament ==
Election	Member	Party
1885	Charles Ritchie	Conservative
1892	John Benn	Liberal
1895	Harry Marks	Conservative
1900	Sir Thomas Dewar	Conservative
1906	William Wedgwood Benn	Liberal
1918	constituency abolished	

== Election results ==
=== Elections in the 1880s ===
General election 1885: Tower Hamlets, St. George
Party	Candidate	Votes	%	±%
Conservative	Charles Ritchie	1,744	59.6	
Liberal	David Salomons	1,180	40.4	
Majority		564	19.2	
Turnout		2,924	67.7	
Registered electors		4,317		
Conservative win (new seat)				

General election 1886: Tower Hamlets, St. George
Party	Candidate	Votes	%	±%
Conservative	Charles Ritchie	1,561	59.2	−0.4
Liberal	Richard Eve	1,076	40.8	+0.4
Majority		485	18.4	−0.8
Turnout		2,637	61.1	−6.6
Registered electors		4,317		
Conservative hold		Swing	-0.4	

Ritchie was appointment President of the Local Government Board, requiring a by-election.

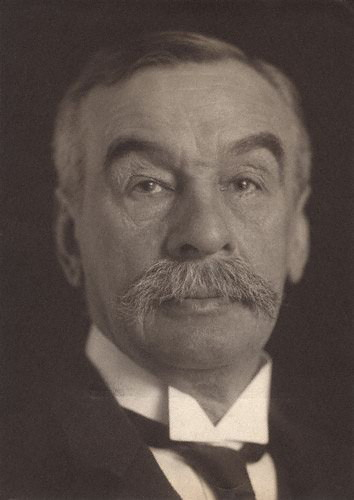
Charles Ritchie

By-election, 12 Aug 1886: St George's
Party	Candidate	Votes	%	±%
Conservative	Charles Ritchie	1,546	63.5	+4.3
Liberal	Richard Eve	889	36.5	−4.3
Majority		657	27.0	+8.6
Turnout		2,435	56.4	−4.7
Registered electors		4,317		
Conservative hold		Swing	+4.3	

=== Elections in the 1890s ===
John Benn

General election 1892: Tower Hamlets, St. George
Party	Candidate	Votes	%	±%
Liberal	John Benn	1,661	56.8	+16.0
Conservative	Charles Ritchie	1,263	43.2	−16.0
Majority		398	13.6	N/A
Turnout		2,924	77.9	+16.8
Registered electors		3,755		
Liberal gain from Conservative		Swing	+16.0	

General election 1895: Tower Hamlets, St. George
Party	Candidate	Votes	%	±%
Conservative	Harry Marks	1,581	50.2	+7.0
Liberal	John Benn	1,570	49.8	−7.0
Majority		11	0.4	N/A
Turnout		3,151	82.4	+4.5
Registered electors		3,824		
Conservative gain from Liberal		Swing	+7.0	

=== Elections in the 1900s ===
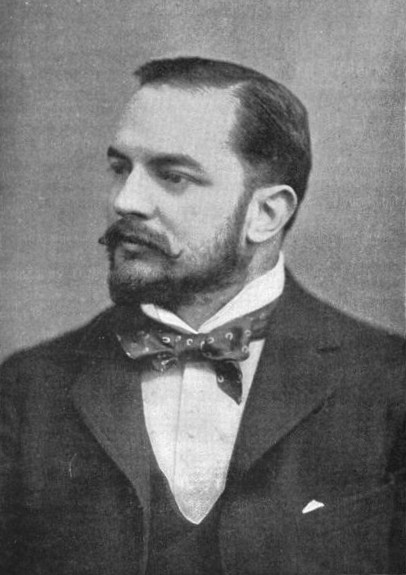
Thomas Dewar

Straus

General election 1900: Tower Hamlets, St. George
Party	Candidate	Votes	%	±%
Conservative	Thomas Dewar	1,437	55.7	+5.5
Liberal	Bertram Straus	1,141	44.3	−5.5
Majority		296	11.4	+11.0
Turnout		2,578	73.3	−9.1
Registered electors		3,518		
Conservative hold		Swing	+5.5	

General election 1906: Tower Hamlets, St. George
Party	Candidate	Votes	%	±%
Liberal	William Wedgwood Benn	1,685	61.3	+17.0
Conservative	H. Hallifax Wells	1,064	38.7	−17.0
Majority		621	22.6	N/A
Turnout		2,749	84.7	+11.4
Registered electors		3,246		
Liberal gain from Conservative		Swing	+17.0	

=== Elections in the 1910s ===
Wedgwood Benn

General election January 1910: Tower Hamlets, St. George
Party	Candidate	Votes	%	±%
Liberal	William Wedgwood Benn	1,568	58.0	−3.3
Conservative	Percy Coleman Simmons	1,134	42.0	+3.3
Majority		434	16.0	−6.6
Turnout		2,702		
Liberal hold		Swing	-3.3	

1910 Tower Hamlets St George by-election
Party	Candidate	Votes	%	±%
Liberal	William Wedgwood Benn	1,598	59.5	+1.5
Conservative	Percy Coleman Simmons	1,089	40.5	−1.5
Majority		509	19.0	+3.0
Turnout		2,687		
Liberal hold		Swing	+1.5	

General election December 1910: Tower Hamlets, St. George
Party	Candidate	Votes	%	±%
Liberal	William Wedgwood Benn	1,401	57.8	−0.2
Conservative	Douglas Clifton Brown	1,022	42.2	+0.2
Majority		379	15.6	−0.4
Turnout		2,423		
Liberal hold		Swing	-1.7	
