= Joseph Adshead =

English merchant, reformer and pamphleteer

Joseph Adshead (1800–1861) was an English merchant, reformer and pamphleteer from Manchester.

== Life ==
Born in Ross, Herefordshire, Adshead worked as an estate agent and merchant. He settled in Manchester around 1820.

In 1835 he was part of the consortium developing Victoria Park, Manchester. He was declared bankrupt in 1839, described as a "wholesale hosier". In 1839 also, he went onto the Council of the Anti-Cornlaw League. In 1838 the Night Asylum, a homeless shelter in Henry Street, Manchester, was founded by Adshead and George Wilson of the League, and Adshead continued to act as its treasurer.

In 1840–1 Adshead was involved with the British India Society, and moved in abolitionist circles. He became secretary of a branch, the Northern Central British India Society, after a visit to Manchester by Joseph Pease. He had worked with George Thompson at the end of 1840 to see its journal The British Indian Advocate issued. He was in the US shortly afterwards, calling on James and Lucretia Mott in Philadelphia on 16 February 1841. In March he sailed back from Boston, where he knew William Lloyd Garrison, with a letter destined for Elizabeth Pease.

Adshead was one of the defendant directors in the landmark case Foss v Harbottle (1843) 67 ER 189, which established the precedent that where a wrong is alleged to have been done to a company, the proper claimant is the company itself.

Adshead became a member of Manchester Corporation, serving as Alderman for St. Anne's Ward. He also took up public causes in the health sector. He supported the Health of Towns Association, and homoeopathy. He advocated the rebuilding out of town of the Manchester Lunatic Asylum, in the early 1840s when its future was in play. He was elected to membership of the Manchester Literary and Philosophical Society on 29 April 1856

At the end of his life he was lobbying for a convalescent hospital in the Manchester area. He died on 15 February 1861, at Withington. He was a correspondent of Florence Nightingale, a contact through Richard Cobden, and after his death she wrote in a letter that he was "my best pupil". The Bottle, George Cruikshank's set of eight temperance engravings, was dedicated to Adshead.

== Works ==
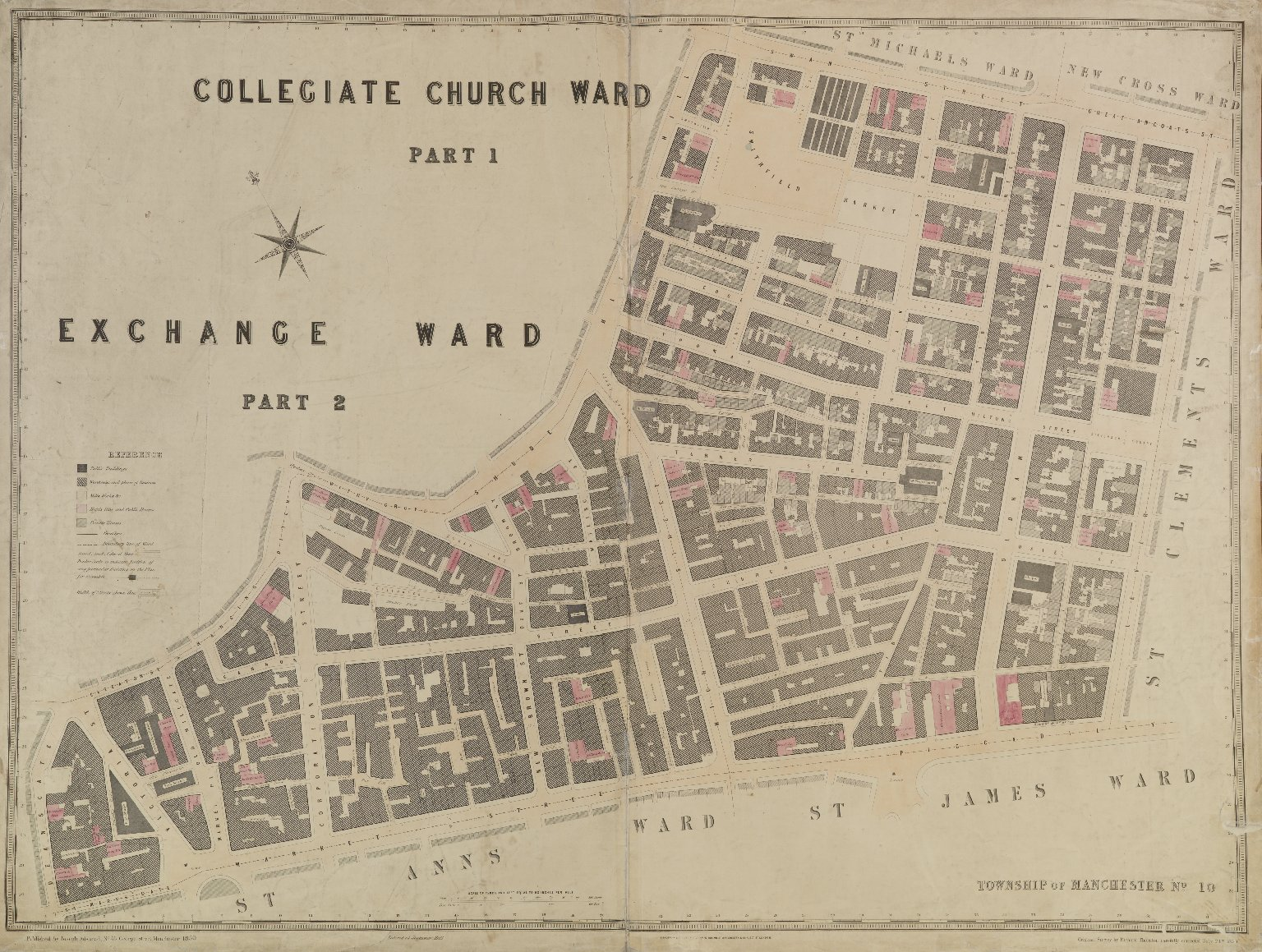
Exchange Ward, Manchester, from Joseph Adshead's Twenty-Four Illustrated Maps of the Township of Manchester (1851)

=== Prisons ===
- Prison Discipline: The Fallacies of The Times (1844)

As a penal reformer, Adshead supported the system of Francis Lieber, and defended the separate system. In Prisons and Prisoners (1845), he described the Eastern State Penitentiary. This work also contained an attack on the views of prisons expressed by Charles Dickens. Adshead argued, influentially, that what Dickens had written in his American Notes (1842) on the "Pennsylvania system" was fiction, and could not be taken seriously as commentary. He also characterised the Eighteenth Annual Report of the Board of Managers of the Boston Prison Discipline Society (1843) on the matters at issue as a "flagrant instance of trickery". A sequel was Our Present Gaol System Deeply Depraving to the Prisoner and a Positive Evil to the Community: Some Remedies Proposed (1847). In it Adshead commented favourably on the positive effect of the separate system on prisoners who were then to be transported to Port Phillip in Australia.

On Juvenile Criminals, Reformatories, and the Means of Rendering the Perishing and Dangerous Classes serviceable to the State (1856), paper given to the Manchester Statistical Society. Adshead gave a further paper to the National Association for the Promotion of Social Science meeting in Liverpool in 1858 on "Reformatory and industrial schools, their comparative economy". He considered the finances of ten each of reformatories, ragged schools and industrial schools. Adshead was critical of Parkhurst, the prison for young offenders, though he did not take the same view of it as Mary Carpenter.

=== Other works ===
- A Circumstantial Narrative of the Wreck of the Rothsay Castle Steampacket: On Her Passage from Liverpool to Beaumaris, 17 August 1831 (1834) The Rothsay Castle was shipwrecked at the east end of the Menai Straits.
- Distress in Manchester (1842). This work contained a contribution from Richard Baron Howard on contagious disease. Adshead made a connection between prostitution and social change driven by industrial development.
- Twenty-Four Illustrated Maps of the Township of Manchester (1851); available online.
- The Progress of Religious Sentiment (1852)

Adshead wrote an introduction to George Catlin's Steam Raft: Suggested as a means of security to human life upon the ocean (1860).
