= 1910 Tower Hamlets St George by-election =

UK parliamentary by-election

| ← 1910 | 1 March 1910 | 1910 → |
| Candidate | Benn | Simmons |
| Party | Liberal | Conservative |
| Popular vote | 1,598 | 1,089 |
| Percentage | 59.5% | 40.5% |
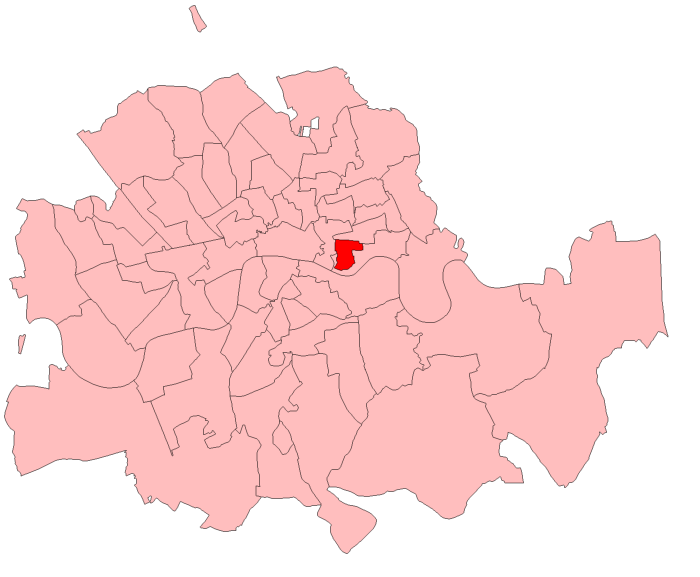
MP before election
Wedgwood Benn
Liberal
Subsequent MP
Wedgwood Benn
Liberal

The 1910 Tower Hamlets St George by-election was a Parliamentary by-election. It returned one Member of Parliament (MP) to the House of Commons of the United Kingdom, elected by the first past the post voting system. It was held on 1 March 1910.

== Vacancy ==
The by-election was caused due to the incumbent Liberal MP, William Wedgwood Benn, becoming a Commissioner of the Treasury, requiring him to seek re-election.

== Electoral history ==
The seat had been Liberal since Benn gained it in 1906. Benn easily held the seat at the January 1910 election, with a reduced majority;

General election January 1910: Tower Hamlets, St. George
| Party | Candidate | Votes | % | ±% |
|---|---|---|---|---|
| Liberal | William Wedgwood Benn | 1,568 | 58.0 | −3.3 |
| Conservative | Percy Coleman Simmons | 1,134 | 42.0 | +3.3 |
| Majority | | 434 | 16.0 | −6.6 |
| Turnout | | 2,702 | | |
| Liberal hold | | Swing | -3.3 | |

== Candidates ==
- The local Liberal Association re-selected 33-year-old Wedgwood Benn to defend the seat.
- The Conservatives retained Percy Coleman Simmons as their candidate.

== Campaign ==
Polling Day was fixed for the 1 March 1910.

== Result ==
The Liberals held the seat and managed a slightly increased majority;

1910 Tower Hamlets St George by-election
| Party | Candidate | Votes | % | ±% |
|---|---|---|---|---|
| Liberal | William Wedgwood Benn | 1,598 | 59.5 | +1.5 |
| Conservative | Percy Coleman Simmons | 1,089 | 40.5 | −1.5 |
| Majority | | 509 | 19.0 | +3.0 |
| Turnout | | 2,687 | | |
| Liberal hold | | Swing | +1.5 | |

== Aftermath ==
Benn was re-elected at the general election 9 months later.

General election December 1910: Tower Hamlets, St. George
| Party | Candidate | Votes | % | ±% |
|---|---|---|---|---|
| Liberal | William Wedgwood Benn | 1,401 | 57.8 | −1.7 |
| Conservative | Douglas Clifton Brown | 1,022 | 42.2 | +1.7 |
| Majority | | 379 | 15.6 | −3.4 |
| Turnout | | 2,423 | | |
| Liberal hold | | Swing | -1.7 | |
