= Welders House =

Grade II listed house in Buckinghamshire, England

Coordinates: 51.60882°N 0.58837°W

Welders House is a Grade II listed house near the village of Jordans, Buckinghamshire, England. Since 1993 it has been the private estate of the Osbourne family and is now the burial site of musician Ozzy Osbourne.

== History ==
Welders House was built between 1898 and 1899 for the politician Charles Thomson Ritchie by his son-in-law Mervyn Macartney. The governors of the St Luke's Hospital for Lunatics in London bought Welders House in 1910 along with its 100-acre estate and the nearby 35-acre Jordans Farm. The farm was sold in 1911 to the Religious Society of Friends. The house operated as a convalescent home for women with mild nervous maladies from 1911 to 1916. Welders Orchard of 11 3/4 acres and a field of 6 3/4 acres were purchased in 1917. The 5-acre Welders Wood was bought in 1920. The War Office borrowed the house from St Luke's in 1918 for a Home of Rest for army nurses suffering from the mental strains of the First World War. It closed in 1927 having been received by the Governors of St Luke's from the War Office in 1922. In 1940 the estate was leased to a couple who unsuccessfully planned to create a private nursing home, it was subsequently leased to the Bon Secours Sisters in 1942 and was part of the St Joseph Nursing Home in nearby Beaconsfield until April 1947.

It was owned by British two-time Academy Award winning special effects director John Stears in the 1980s. It was then bought by Ozzy and Sharon Osbourne in 1993. Sharon Osbourne claims the house was chosen due to its extreme distance from any public houses. (Jordan’s is a Quaker Village and hence “dry”).

Since this time significant renovation and expansion work has been undertaken adding an alternative driveway, a tennis court and gymnasium.

The house is built of red brick and has 2 storeys with Dutch style gabled attics.

It has been Grade II listed on the National Heritage List for England since December 1984. The formal grounds feature a Rose garden, a copy of the Bethesda Fountain in New York City's Central Park, and a K6 telephone box.

In 2025, not long after his death and funeral, Ozzy Osbourne was buried in the grounds of Welders House near a lake.
