= John Stears =

British special effects artist (1934–1999)

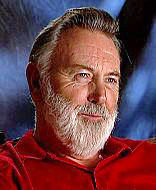
- Stears c. 1999.
- Born: 25 August 1934; Uxbridge, Middlesex, England
- Died: 28 April 1999 (aged 64); Pacific Palisades, California, United States
- Occupation: Special effects artist
- Years active: 1956–1999
- Spouse: Brenda Livy (m. 1960)
- Children: 2

John Stears (25 August 1934 – 28 April 1999) was an English special effects artist. A two-time Academy Award winner, nicknamed the "Dean of Special Effects," and "The Real Q", he was responsible for creating a host of iconic movie gadgets and effects, including James Bond's lethal Aston Martin DB5, Luke Skywalker's Landspeeder, the Jedi Knights' lightsabers, the Death Star, and the robots R2-D2 and C-3PO.

== Life and family ==
Stears was born in Uxbridge, Middlesex (now part of Greater London) on 25 August 1934 and grew up in nearby Ickenham. Stears studied at Harrow College of Art and Southall Technical School before working as a draughtsman with the Air Ministry.

He served as a dispatch rider during his National Service, then joined a firm of architects where he was able to utilise his passion for model-making by constructing scale models of building projects for clients.

For most of his life he lived at Welders House in Beaconsfield, Buckinghamshire, where he reared cattle and his wife ran the Livny Borzoi Kennels, breeding Borzoi show dogs.

In 1993, he sold his Welders House country estate in Buckinghamshire to the singer Ozzy Osbourne and emigrated to California with his wife Brenda, whom he married in 1960, the couple had two children.

== Film career ==
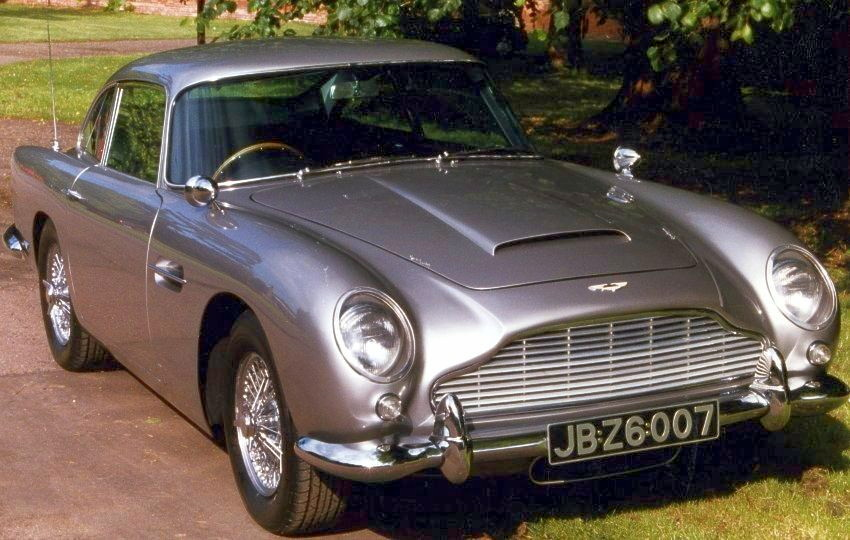
The deadly, gadget-filled DB5 Stears created for Thunderball.

Stears' effects featured in the first eight James Bond films, winning an Academy Award for Best Visual Effects in 1965 for Thunderball, and sharing another Academy Award in 1977 for Star Wars.

He created some of the most famous scenes in the movies. He blew up the villain's Jamaican hideout at the end of Dr. No (1962), and for Goldfinger (1964), he created Agent 007's Aston Martin DB5, featuring bullet-proof windows, revolving licence plates, forward-firing machine guns, a rear oil-slick dispenser and a passenger-side ejector seat.

He also created an avalanche for On Her Majesty's Secret Service (1969) and built flying cars for the musical film Chitty Chitty Bang Bang (1968) and the Bond film The Man with the Golden Gun (1974).

Stears grew disenchanted with the Bond franchise, and vowed never to do another one. He complained that the "team spirit" had gone. Stears expressed great regret that Kevin McClory could not get his rival Bond film, Warhead, into production, as Stears wanted to work on that film.

In 1976, Stears received a telephone call from George Lucas, who had been a great admirer of the Bond films, who wanted to know if he was interested in creating mechanical and electrical effects for a film that he had written, Star Wars. Stears accepted the offer. Stears had something in common with Alec Guinness and John Williams; he had won an Academy Award before working on Star Wars. For Star Wars (1977), Stears created the robots R2-D2 and C-3PO, Luke Skywalker's Landspeeder, the special effects for the Jedi Knights' lightsabers - the first lightsaber hilt props having been created for Star Wars by Roger Christian -, and the Death Star. Stears was also credited, along with John Dykstra, for the original film's climactic aerial dogfight. Other well known mechanical effects Stears orchestrated included the garbage compactor, making an X-wing fighter fly and the Jawa's sandcrawler.

In 1978, producer Harry Saltzman hired Stears to direct the "shrunken man" epic film The Micronauts. The troubled project had been in pre-production for many years and saw many directors come and go; ultimately the film never made it into production.

== Awards ==
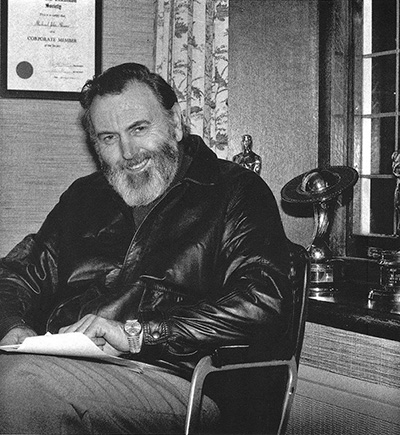
John Stears with his two Academy Awards and Saturn Award

John Stears is notably one of only a few people to ever win an Academy Award for a James Bond film and one of only eight to win an Academy Award for a Star Wars film.

- 1965 – Academy Award for Best Visual Effects for Thunderball
- 1977 – Academy Award for Best Visual Effects for Star Wars Episode IV: A New Hope
- 1978 – Saturn Award for Best Special Effects for Star Wars Episode IV: A New Hope
- 1982 – Saturn Award for Best Special Effects (nomination) for Outland

== Selected filmography ==
- Call Me Bwana (1963)
- From Russia with Love (1963)
- Goldfinger (1964)
- Court Martial (1965)
- Thunderball (1965)
- You Only Live Twice (1967)
- Chitty Chitty Bang Bang (1968)
- On Her Majesty's Secret Service (1969)
- Toomorrow (1970)
- The Pied Piper (1972)
- Sitting Target (1972)
- Ghost in the Noonday Sun (1973)
- O Lucky Man! (1973)
- The Man with the Golden Gun (1974)
- That Lucky Touch (1975)
- Sky Riders (1976)
- Star Wars (1977)
- The Martian Chronicles (1980)
- Hopscotch (1980)
- The Awakening (1980)
- Outland (1981)
- Turkey Shoot (1983)
- Sahara (1983)
- The Bounty (1984)
- F/X: Murder by Illusion (1986)
- Haunted Honeymoon (1986)
- Miracles (1986)
- Navy SEALs (1990)
- Babylon 5: The Gathering (1993)
- Babylon 5 (1994)
- The Mask of Zorro (1998)

== Death ==
Stears died on 28 April 1999 in UCLA Medical Center after a stroke. His wife, Brenda, and other family members had wanted the death kept quiet until after services in Pacific Palisades in May and in London. The family announced his death in June of that same year. Stears owned homes in Pacific Palisades and in Beaconsfield, England, where he and his wife raised cattle and show dogs.
