= Sir Henry Clay, 6th Baronet =

Sir Henry Felix Clay, 6th Baronet (8 February 1909 – 8 June 1985), was an English engineer. A partner in McLellan and Partners, consulting engineers, he was a Member of the American Institute of Electrical Engineers.

== Early life ==
Clay was the son of Sir George Felix Neville Clay, 5th Baronet (1871–1941), by his marriage to Rachel Hobhouse (1883–1981), the eldest daughter of the Right Hon. Henry Hobhouse. He had four siblings: older sisters Margaret and Janet, younger sister Theresa, and younger brother Anthony. Clay was educated at Gresham's School, Holt, and Trinity College, Cambridge, graduating MA in 1935.

The Clay family lived at number 18, Kensington Park Gardens, Notting Hill, London. When Clay was thirteen, his first cousin once removed, Richard Meinertzhagen, came to live in the house next door, number 17. Meinertzhagen was a well-known ornithologist and a distinguished soldier, but he was also a "colossal fraud", who stole bird specimens and described spurious species and who invented and exaggerated his military adventures. On 6 July 1928, Meinertzhagen's wife died from a gunshot wound, said to have occurred while she and Meinertzhagen were firing at targets. Her death was held to be an accident, but there was always suspicion that Meinertzhagen had killed his wife.

== Life and career ==
After graduating from Cambridge, Clay entered the engineering profession and became a partner in McLellan and Partners, a firm of consulting engineers. He was also a Member of the Institute of Electrical Engineers of New York City.

He succeeded to the title of 6th Baronet, of Fulwell Lodge, Middlesex (created 1841) on 11 November 1941.

Clay died at Cocking, West Sussex, on 8 June 1985. His final address was Wheelwrights, Cocking, Midhurst, Sussex.

== Family ==
On 4 November 1933, Clay married Phyllis Mary Paramore, a daughter of Richard Horace Paramore, and they had three children: Jenny Elizabeth Clay, born 28 March 1936; Sarah Richenda Clay, born 12 August 1938; and Sir Richard Henry Clay, 7th Baronet, born 2 June 1940. His wife survived him, dying in 1997.

Baronetage of the United Kingdom
Preceded by George Clay	Baronet (of Fulwell Lodge); 1941–1985	Succeeded by Richard Clay
