= Joseph d'Aguilar Samuda =

English engineer and politician

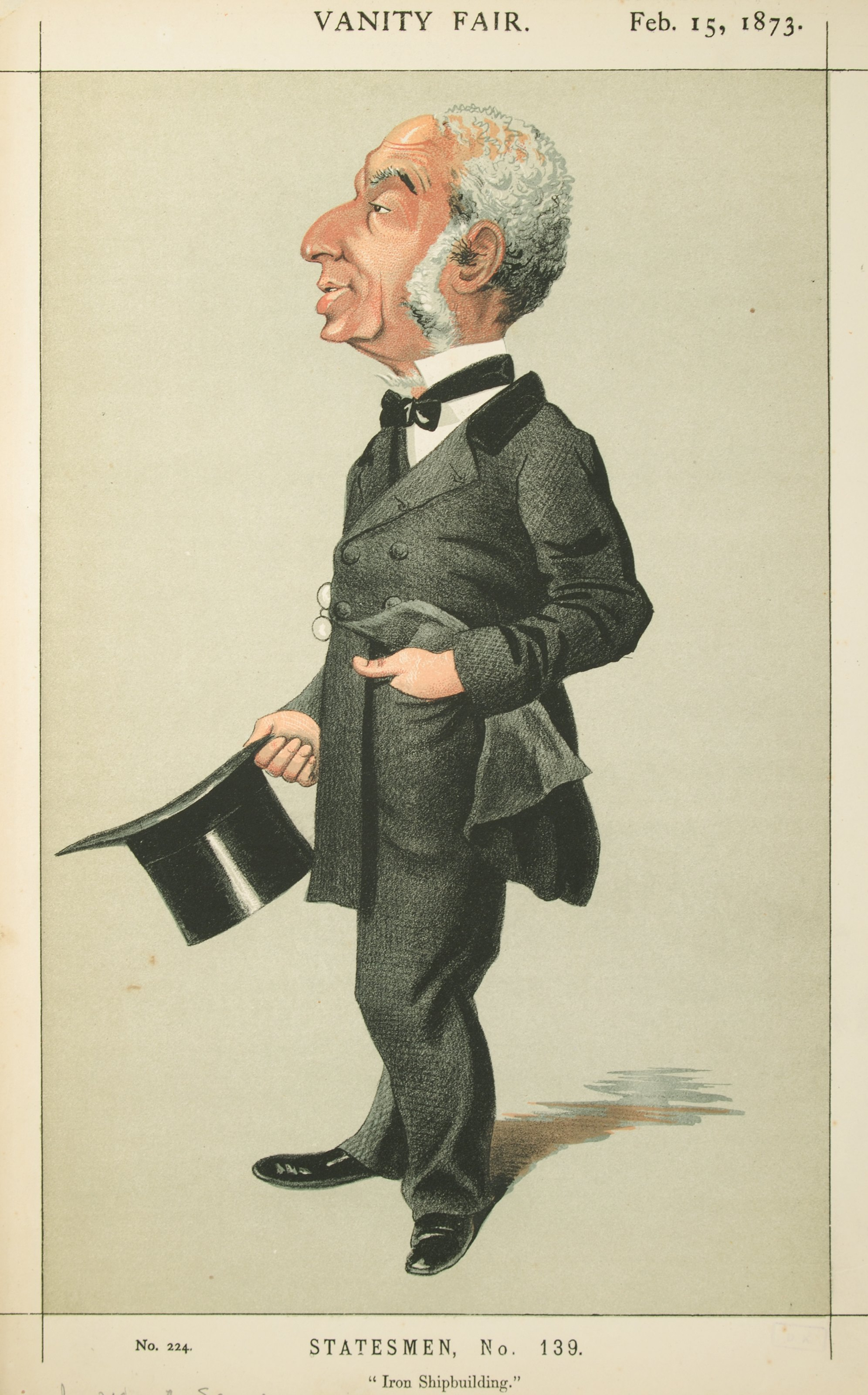
Caricature of Joseph d'Aguilar Samuda

Joseph d'Aguilar Samuda (21 May 1813 – 27 April 1885) was an English engineer and politician. He was born in London the younger son of Abraham Samuda, and brother of Jacob Samuda. He started out in his father's counting-house, but in 1832 he joined his elder brother to set up Samuda Brothers.

== Marine engineering and shipbuilding ==
Joseph and his brother Jacob set themselves up as marine and general engineers and shipbuilders on the Isle of Dogs in the Docklands. For the first ten years the company principally confined itself to the building of marine engines. In 1843 they entered the ship-building business, and from that time onward, notwithstanding the death of Jacob in an accident on the Thames, the firm was continuously engaged in constructing iron steamships for the Royal Navy, merchant marine, and passenger and mail services, besides royal yachts and river-boats. Many of these vessels were built under Samuda's personal superintendence. In 1860 Joseph helped to establish the Institute of Naval Architects, of which he was the first treasurer and subsequently a vice-president. He frequently contributed to its Transactions. In 1862 he became a member of the Institution of Civil Engineers, to whose Proceedings he likewise contributed.

== Atmospheric railways ==
In 1841 Joseph published A Treatise on the Adaptation of Atmospheric Pressure to the Purposes of Locomotion on Railways As a result, he was invited by the directors of the London and Croydon Railway to supply equipment to operate their trains on the Atmospheric railway principle between London Bridge and Epsom. The first stage of this project (between Croydon and Forest Hill) opened in January 1846, but the system of propulsion encountered many problems. The London and Croydon Railway became a part of the London Brighton and South Coast Railway in July, and the new board of directors invited Samuda to operate the new atmospheric railway in return for a fixed fee. However, once further propulsion problems became apparent in the second section of line to be equipped (between Forest Hill and New Cross during 1847 the atmospheric method of propulsion was abandoned and the equipment sold.

== Political career ==
Joseph Samuda also had an important parliamentary career. He was a member of the Metropolitan Board of Works from 1860 to 1865, whereupon he entered Parliament as the Liberal MP for Tavistock. He sat for that constituency until 1868, when he was returned for the Tower Hamlets, which he represented until 1880. Then he lost his seat owing to his support for Benjamin Disraeli's foreign policy. While in the House he spoke with much authority on all matters connected with his profession. Some of his speeches are described as "treasure-houses of technical and political knowledge." He abandoned Judaism and was interred in Kensal Green Cemetery, London. In 1837 he married Louisa Ballin, daughter of Samuel Ballin of Holloway.

The Samuda Estate, on the site of his shipyard, in Cubitt Town, is named after him and his brother, and includes Ballin Court, named after his wife, Louisa. They lived at 7 Gloucester Square, Bayswater and had a daughter called Ada.

He was one of the original officers of the 2nd Tower Hamlets Rifle Volunteer Corps raised in the East End of London in April 1861, when he was commissioned as a captain.

Parliament of the United Kingdom
Preceded by Lord Arthur John Edward Russell and Sir John Salusbury-Trelawny	Member of Parliament for Tavistock; 1865–1868; With: Lord Arthur John Edward Russell	Succeeded by Lord Arthur John Edward Russell
Preceded by Acton Smee Ayrton and Charles Salisbury Butler	Member of Parliament for Tower Hamlets; 1868–1880; With: Acton Smee Ayrton, to 1874; Charles Ritchie, from 1874	Succeeded by James Bryce and Charles Ritchie
