= Charles Salisbury Butler =

British politician

Member of Parliament for Tower Hamlets
- In office 8 July 1852 – 18 November 1868 Serving with Acton Smee Ayrton (1857–1868); William Clay (1852–1857)
- Preceded by: George Thompson; William Clay
- Succeeded by: Acton Smee Ayrton; Joseph d'Aguilar Samuda

Personal details
- Born: 1812
- Died: 12 November 1870 (aged 57–58)
- Party: Liberal
- Other political affiliations: Radical
- Spouse: Elizabeth Kingstone (m. 1833)
- Children: Eight
- Parent(s): John Butler; Elizabeth Mary Butt

Charles Salisbury Butler (1812 – 12 November 1870) was a British Liberal Party and Radical politician.

== Family and early life ==
Born in 1812, Butler was the son of John and Elizabeth Mary (née Butt) Butler. He married Elizabeth, daughter of Edward Kingstone, in 1833 and they had eight children: Charles Edward Kingstone (died 1869); John Banks Meek; Elizabeth Lecesne Kingstone; Emily; Sophia; Frances; Rosa Seldon; and Louisa.

== Political career ==
Butler was elected Radical MP for Tower Hamlets at the 1852 general election and, joining the Liberal Party upon its formation in 1859, he held the seat until 1868 when he stood down.

== Other activities ==
Butler was also a Justice of the Peace for Middlesex, City of Westminster and the Liberties of the Tower of London as well as Deputy Lieutenant for the latter. He also held the role of Chairman of the Quarter Sessions of the Liberties of Her Majesty's Tower and of the Court of Lieutenancy of the Tower Hamlets, and Chairman of the Divisional Bench of the County of Middlesex. Upon the death of the Arthur Wellesley, 1st Duke of Wellington, he jointly and temporarily held the office of Lord Lieutenant of the Tower Hamlets with William FitzGerald-de Ros, 22nd Baron de Ros.

Parliament of the United Kingdom
Preceded by George Thompson; William Clay	Member of Parliament for Tower Hamlets; 1852–1868; With: Acton Smee Ayrton (1857–1868); William Clay (1852–1857)	Succeeded by Acton Smee Ayrton; Joseph d'Aguilar Samuda
