= Clay baronets =

Baronetcy in the Baronetage of the United Kingdom

Escutcheon of the Clay baronets of Fulwell Lodge

The Clay Baronetcy, of Fulwell Lodge in the County of Middlesex, is a title in the Baronetage of the United Kingdom. It was created in 1841 for William Clay, Member of Parliament for Tower Hamlets from 1832 to 1857 and Secretary to the Board of Control from 1839 to 1841. He was the son of George Clay, a prominent merchant and shipowner.

== Clay Baronets, of Fulwell Lodge (1841) ==
- Sir William Clay, 1st Baronet (1791–1869)
- Sir William Dickason Clay, 2nd Baronet (1828–1876)
- Sir George Clay, 3rd Baronet (1831–1878)
- Sir Arthur Temple Felix Clay, 4th Baronet (1842–1928)
- Sir George Felix Neville Clay, 5th Baronet (1871–1941)
- Sir Henry Felix Clay, 6th Baronet (8 February 1909 – 8 June 1985)
- Sir Richard Henry Clay, 7th Baronet (2 June 1940 – 28 November 2020)
- Sir Charles Richard Clay, 8th Baronet (born 1965).
