= Sir William Clay, 1st Baronet =

British politician

Sir William Clay 1st Baronet
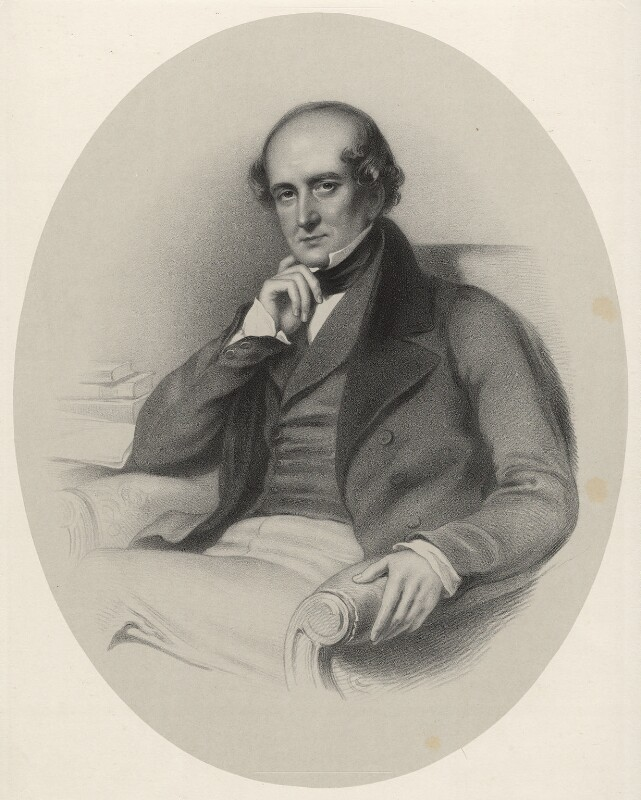

Member of Parliament for Tower Hamlets

Baronet of Fulwell Lodge
- In office 1832–1857
- Preceded by: New constituency
- Succeeded by: George Thompson

Joint Secretary to the Board of Control
- In office 1839–1841
- In office 30 September 1841 – 13 March 1869
- Preceded by: New creation
- Succeeded by: Sir William Clay, 2nd Baronet

Personal details
- Born: August 15, 1791
- Died: March 13, 1869 (aged 77)
- Party: Liberal
- Spouse: Harriet Dickason
- Children: Several, including Sir William Clay, 2nd Baronet
- Occupation: Politician, Shipowner

Sir William Clay, 1st Baronet (15 August 1791 – 13 March 1869) was an English Liberal Party politician and considered a reformist and a Radical.

Clay was the son of George Clay, a prominent London merchant and shipowner.

He was elected at the 1832 general election as a Member of Parliament (MP) for Tower Hamlets, and held the seat for 25 years until his defeat at the 1857 general election. He served under Lord Melbourne as Joint Secretary to the Board of Control from 1839 to 1841. On 30 September 1841 he was made a baronet, of Fulwell Lodge in the County of Middlesex.

Clay married Harriet, daughter of Thomas Dickason, of Fulwell Lodge, Twickenham, Middlesex, in 1822. They had several children and lived also at 35 Cadogan Place, Chelsea, Middlesex. Lady Clay died in December 1867. Clay survived her and died in March 1869, aged 77. His probate was sworn in the c.£20,000-broad bracket of under £120,000 (equivalent to about £12,300,000 in 2025). He was succeeded in the baronetcy by his son, William.

== Family ==
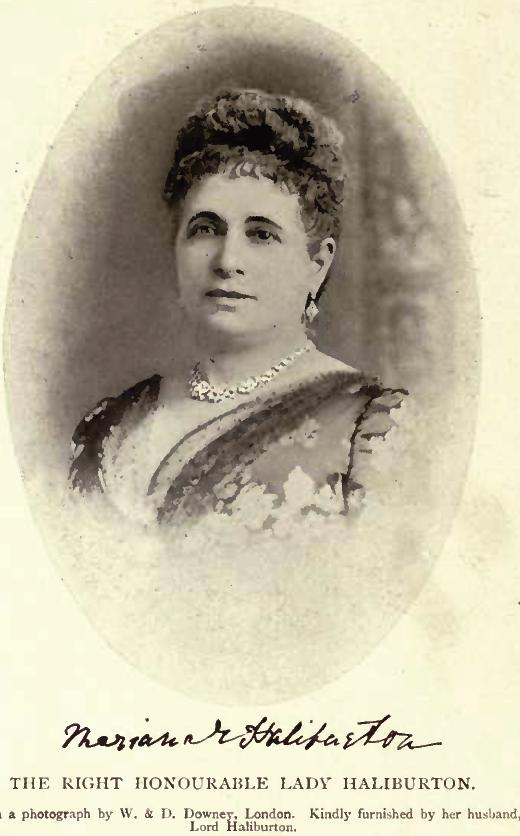
Sir William Clay, 2nd Baronet's wife Lady Mariana Emily (née Shuster) later Clay and Haliburton by W. & D. Downey

Sir William Clay, 2nd Baronet married Mariana Emily, daughter of Leo Schuster in 1855. They had no children. He died on 3 November 1877. His widow married Arthur Haliburton, 1st Baron Haliburton.

Parliament of the United Kingdom
New constituency	Member of Parliament for Tower Hamlets; 1832 – 1857; With: Stephen Lushington 1832–41; Charles Richard Fox 1841–47; George Thompson 1847–52; Charles Salisbury Butler 1852–68	Succeeded by Charles Salisbury Butler; Acton Smee Ayrton
Political offices
Preceded by Robert Vernon Smith; Lord Seymour	Joint Secretary to the Board of Control; 1839–1841 with Lord Seymour 1839–1841; Charles Buller 1841	Succeeded by James Emerson Tennent; Hon. Bingham Baring
Baronetage of the United Kingdom
New creation	Baronet (of Fulwell Lodge); 1841–1869	Succeeded by William Dickason Clay
