= Frederick Chesson =

Frederick William Chesson (1833 – 29 April 1888) was an English journalist and prominent anti-slavery campaigner. He was active in the London Aborigines' Protection Society and Emancipation Committee, and met Harriet Jacobs when she was in England in 1858; and was a vocal supporter of the Union side during the American Civil War.

In 1855 he married Amelia Thompson, daughter of activist George Thompson (1804–1878). He was also a leading supporter of Sir Charles Dilke, his Member of Parliament, during Dilke's scandalous divorce case.

In 1859, Chesson and Thompson founded the London Emancipation Society which strongly supported the Unionist side in the American Civil War. He wrote on Richard Cobden, for his major biography.

== External Resources ==
- Thompson Chesson Scrapbooks From the Rare Book and Special Collections Division at the Library of Congress
