= Acton Smee Ayrton =

British barrister and Liberal Party politician

The Right Honourable Acton Smee Ayrton
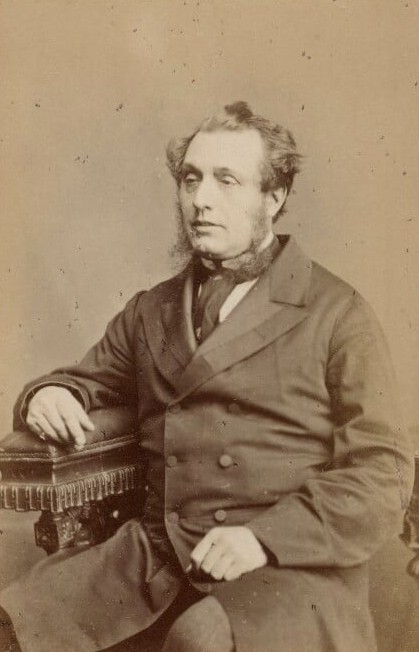
- Photograph of Ayrton by the London Stereoscopic and Photographic Company, c. 1873

First Commissioner of Works
- In office 26 October 1869 – 11 August 1873
- Monarch: Queen Victoria
- Prime Minister: William Ewart Gladstone
- Preceded by: Austen Henry Layard
- Succeeded by: William Patrick Adam

Personal details
- Born: 5 August 1816
- Died: 30 November 1886 (aged 70)
- Party: Liberal

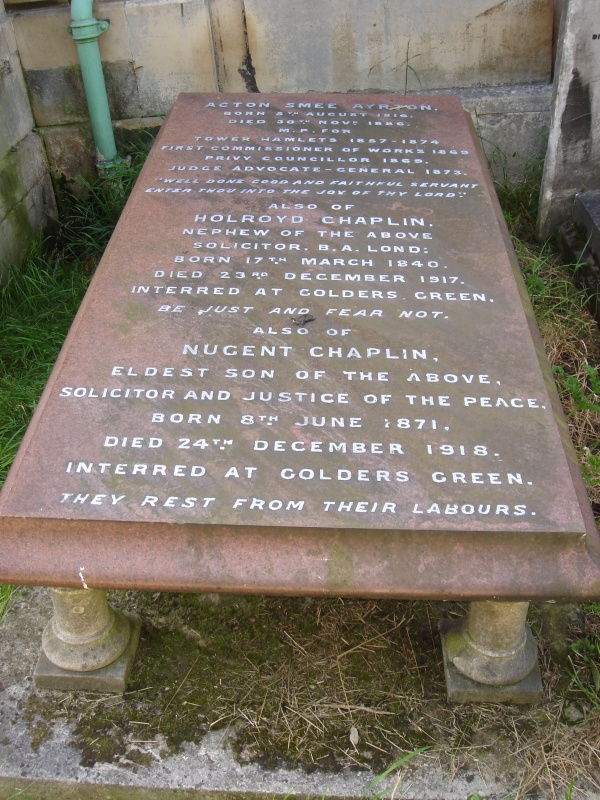
Funerary monument, Brompton Cemetery, London.

Acton Smee Ayrton (5 August 1816 – 30 November 1886) was a British barrister and Liberal Party politician. Considered a radical and champion of the working classes, he served as First Commissioner of Works under William Ewart Gladstone between 1869 and 1873. He is best remembered for the "Ayrton controversy" over scientific facilities at Kew Gardens.

== Family ==
Acton Smee Ayrton was the son of British solicitor Frederick and Juliana Caroline Rebecca Adriana Ayrton, the fourth-born son of 5 children. He was also the uncle of the physicist and electrical engineer William Edward Ayrton.

== Political and legal career ==
Ayrton practised as a solicitor in Bombay, British India, and was called to the Bar, Middle Temple, in 1853. In 1857 he was elected Member of Parliament for Tower Hamlets, a seat he held until 1874. He held office in William Ewart Gladstone's first administration as Financial Secretary to the Treasury from 1868 to 1869 and as First Commissioner of Works from 1869 to 1873 and was sworn of the Privy Council in 1869.

Ayrton is best remembered for the so-called "Ayrton controversy". In an attempt, in the early 1870s, to reduce Government spending, Ayrton (as First Commissioner of Works) encouraged a proposal that the costly scientific functions of Kew Gardens should be transferred and that the gardens should be retained purely as a public park. This prompted a confrontation with Joseph Dalton Hooker (Director at Kew), who enlisted the support of Charles Darwin and Charles Lyell, amongst other scientific luminaries. After debates in both Houses of Parliament, Ayrton was transferred to the post of Judge Advocate General and the proposal failed.

Ayrton remained as Judge Advocate General until the Gladstone government fell in February 1874. He lost his seat in parliament in the general election of that year and never returned to the House of Commons.

In the Palace of Westminster the lantern at the top of the Elizabeth Tower (commonly called Big Ben) is called the Ayrton Light, lit when either House of Parliament is sitting after dark. It was installed in 1885 at the request of Queen Victoria so that she could see from Buckingham Palace when the members were sitting and named after Ayrton.

== Personal life ==
For the last few years of his life, he was a daily frequenter of the Reform Club. He died at the Mount Dore Hotel, Bournemouth, on 30 November 1886.

He is buried in Brompton Cemetery, London.

Parliament of the United Kingdom
Preceded by Sir William Clay, Bt; Charles Salisbury Butler	Member of Parliament for Tower Hamlets; 1857–1874; With: Charles Salisbury Butler	Succeeded by Charles Ritchie; Joseph d'Aguilar Samuda
Political offices
Preceded by George Sclater-Booth	Financial Secretary to the Treasury; 1868–1869	Succeeded by James Stansfeld
Preceded by Austen Henry Layard	First Commissioner of Works; 1869–1873	Succeeded by William Patrick Adam
Preceded by Sir Robert Phillimore, Bt	Judge Advocate General; 1873–1874	Succeeded by Stephen Cave
