= British India Society =

The British India Society was a society concerned about ethical practice in British India. It was founded in 1839, and from 1843 had a branch society in Bengal.

== About the society ==
The British India Society was founded in 1839 by British and American abolitionists, East India Company (EIC) men, private traders and members of the Bengali elite. This relatively short-lived organisation argued that, if properly managed, India's "fertile soil and willing sons" could provide an ethical source of sugar, cotton and other tropical goods that would undercut slavery in the American South. This anti-slavery agenda was combined with an attack on EIC misrule and the promotion of private enterprise in India.

=== Founders ===
William Adam, after visiting Raja Ram Mohan Roy in India, returned to England, and formed the Society with George Thompson, William Ednis, and Major General John Briggs, to organise meetings and create awareness of conditions in India.

=== Publications ===
The Society issued a newspaper British Indian Advocate from 1841.
