= George Thompson (abolitionist) =

British abolitionist and politician

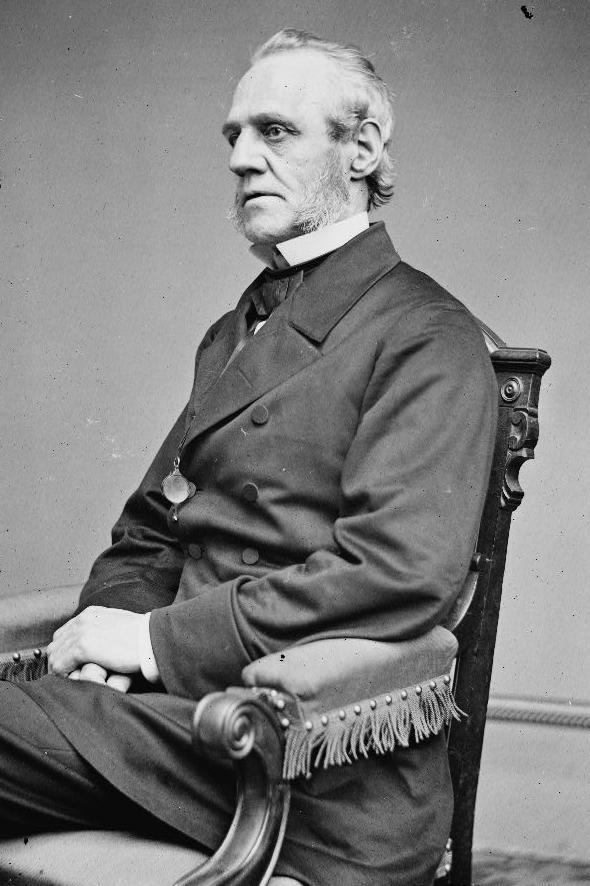

Member of Parliament for Tower Hamlets
- In office 1847–1852
- Preceded by: Charles Richard Fox
- Succeeded by: Charles Salisbury Butler

Personal details
- Born: 18 June 1804 Liverpool, England
- Died: 7 October 1878 (aged 74) Leeds, England
- Party: Radical
- Spouse: Anne Spry (m. 1831; died 1878)
- Children: 6
- Occupation: Abolitionist, activist, politician

George Donisthorpe Thompson (18 June 1804 – 7 October 1878) was a British abolitionist and politician who toured giving lectures and worked for legislation while serving as a Member of Parliament. He was arguably one of the most important abolitionists and human rights lecturers in the United Kingdom and the United States.

== Early life ==
Thompson had little formal education and was largely self-taught. In early adulthood, he began a life of professional activism, starting with his role in founding a mutual improvement society at the age of eighteen, as well as his membership in debate societies. This suggests an early interest in self-betterment and the issues of the day. His father worked aboard a slave trading vessel, and his stories of the horrors of the slave trade planted the issue in the younger Thompson's mind from an early age. He recalls the stories that his father told in some of his later writings, recounting his father's observations of the inhumane treatment of slaves.

== Activism in Britain ==
Initially Thompson had little knowledge of slavery, though he had gained a reputation as an able orator. He was hired by the society to try to get slavery immediately abolished on moral and religious grounds, a concept called "immediatism." He quickly took up the dissemination of the Society's creed: "To uphold slavery is a crime before God, and the condition must, therefore, be immediately abolished." In 1832 he travelled to Scotland, where he gained an interest in the abolition of slavery in the United States and other parts of the world. While in Scotland he also met William Lloyd Garrison, who would remain a lifelong friend and colleague, as well as Nathaniel Paul, an African-American abolitionist. In Glasgow in 1833 he debated with Peter Borthwick, who had been appointed by the West India Association to defend slavery.

Thompson was invited by Garrison to visit New England, and this proposal was not only accepted by his supporters in Glasgow but the Edinburgh Emancipation Society was formed so that it too could back Thompson's journey. From 1836 to 1847 he was active in every major anti-slavery debate in Britain, including the 1840 World Anti-Slavery Convention in London. In 1847 he was elected to the House of Commons as a Member of Parliament (MP) for Tower Hamlets.

Thompson was also an advocate of East Indian reform, free trade, Chartism, nonresistance, and the peace movement. However, he was most prominent in his work to eliminate slavery at home and abroad, often protesting legislation that offered limited or gradual restriction on slavery. Favoring a quick and decisive emancipation of all slaves, he was ultimately unsatisfied with the Slavery Abolition Act 1833, because it forced slaves to work as apprentices for six years after their "liberation." He therefore used his position in Parliament to push for additional legislation.

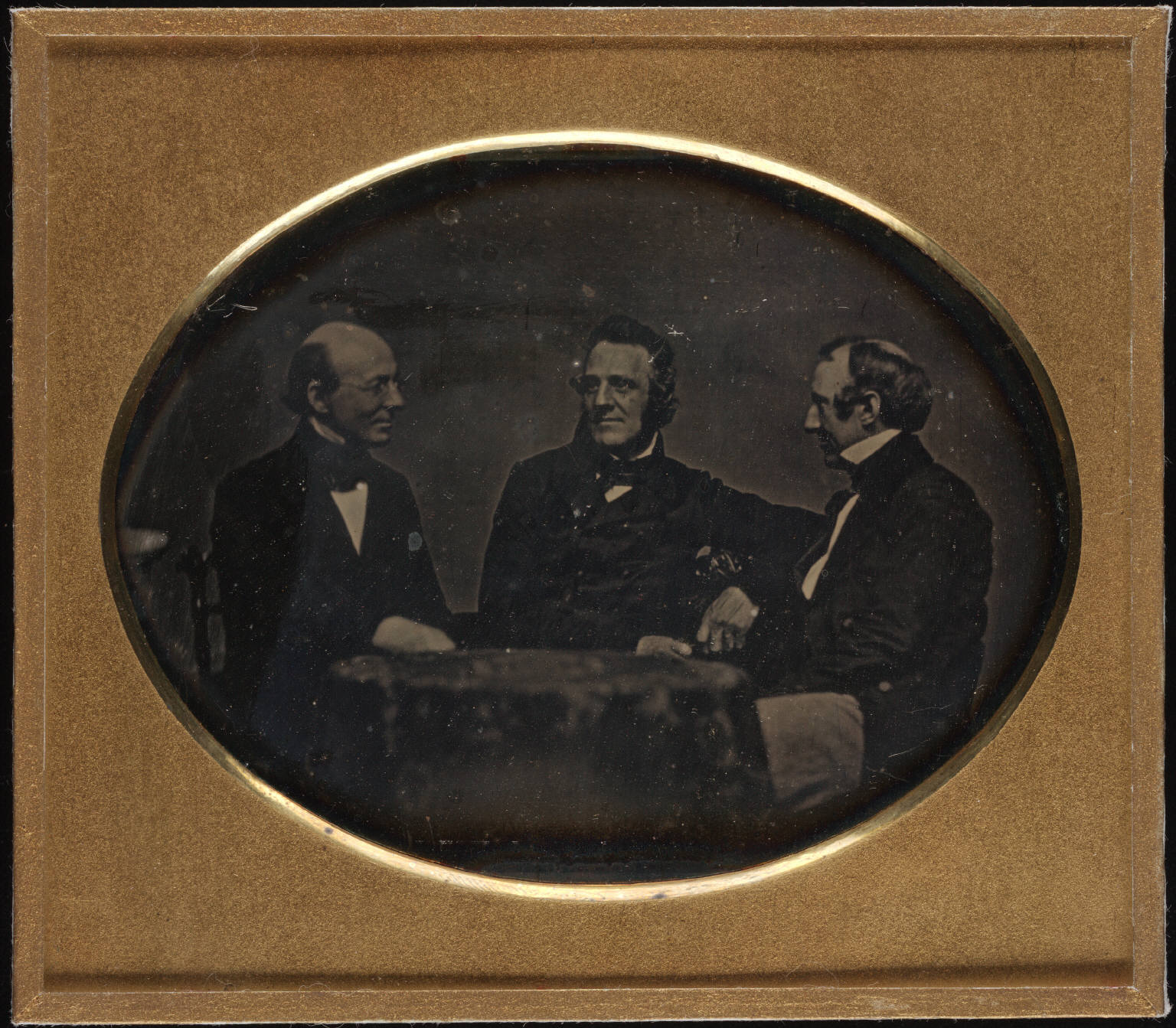
Portrait of William Lloyd Garrison, George Thompson and Wendell Phillips, ca. 1850–1851 (photo by Southworth & Hawes)

== Activism in the United States ==
George Thompson was an active lecturer, and he willingly pointed out the role that America played in the perpetuation of slavery. He first traveled to the United States in 1834, where he attracted the attention of pro-slavery men, and barely escaped being captured by them after one of his lecturing sessions. His lecture circuit that year was credited with the formation of over 150 anti-slavery societies around the US, and inspired many to join the anti-slavery cause. The resistance to his platform did not abate, and he was forced to return to Britain, via Tasmania (Australia). The Hobart Town Courier newspaper, 8 Jul 1836, carried a letter, penned by Thompson in November of the previous year, intended for Patrick Letham of Glasgow. In his letter, Thompson states that he had arrived "within the hour" at New Brunswick, Canada, by British brig, having "left the United States to escape the assassin's knife". The editor's note adds that attempts to "burn and murder" him had been made in several US towns.

When the Fugitive Slave Law was passed in 1850, Thompson returned to the United States, and he was this time quite popular among proponents of abolitionism, now that the movement had increased in size and influence.

In 1859, with his son-in-law Frederick William Chesson, he founded the London Emancipation Society, which strongly supported the Union side in the American Civil War. In 1860, Thompson and Frederick Douglass debated the nature of the United States Constitution in the context of slavery. Their debates were highly publicized and later published in pamphlet form as The Constitution of the United States: is it pro-slavery or anti-slavery?

During a final visit in 1864, he allied with William Wells Brown in advocating the destruction of slavery. He also met Abraham Lincoln, and both supported and witnessed the final destruction of the Confederacy at Fort Sumter in 1865.

== British India Society ==
He was involved in the setting up of the British India Society in 1839. He was also the President of the Bengal British India Society, which was established in 1843. Bengal British India Society aimed to study the actual condition of people in British India, promote loyalty to the British rule and promote general public interest.

== Return to England and death ==
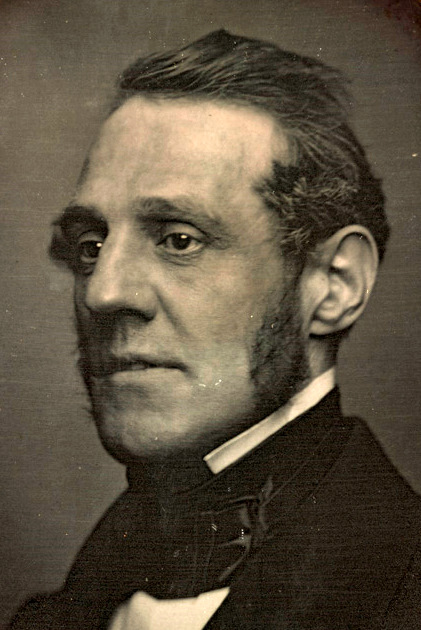
1851 daguerreotype

Thompson became ill and traveled back to his home country, where he died in 1878, and was buried in Beckett Street Cemetery, Leeds. While his advocacy of abolitionism went relatively unnoticed after his death, his efforts to effect a worldwide abolitionist movement cannot be ignored. His profession as activist allowed him to make a living by supporting the cause that he cared about, as well as enabling him to make unprecedented steps in freeing enslaved peoples around the world.

== Personal life ==
On 29 January 1831 in Islington, Thompson married Anne Erskine Lorraine Spry. Thompson had several children who survived to adulthood: Louisa Eliza Spry Thompson (m. Frederick Arthur Nosworthy), Amelia Ann Everard Thompson (m. Frederick William Chesson), George Herbert Thompson (m. Marianne Cronin) and Edith Thompson. Another son, named after William Lloyd Garrison, died aged 15. A daughter, named after Elizabeth Pease, died aged 6.

Parliament of the United Kingdom
Preceded by Charles Richard Fox; Sir William Clay, Bt	Member of Parliament for Tower Hamlets; 1847 – 1852; With: Sir William Clay, Bt	Succeeded by Charles Salisbury Butler; Sir William Clay, Bt
