= Richard Baron Howard =

English physician

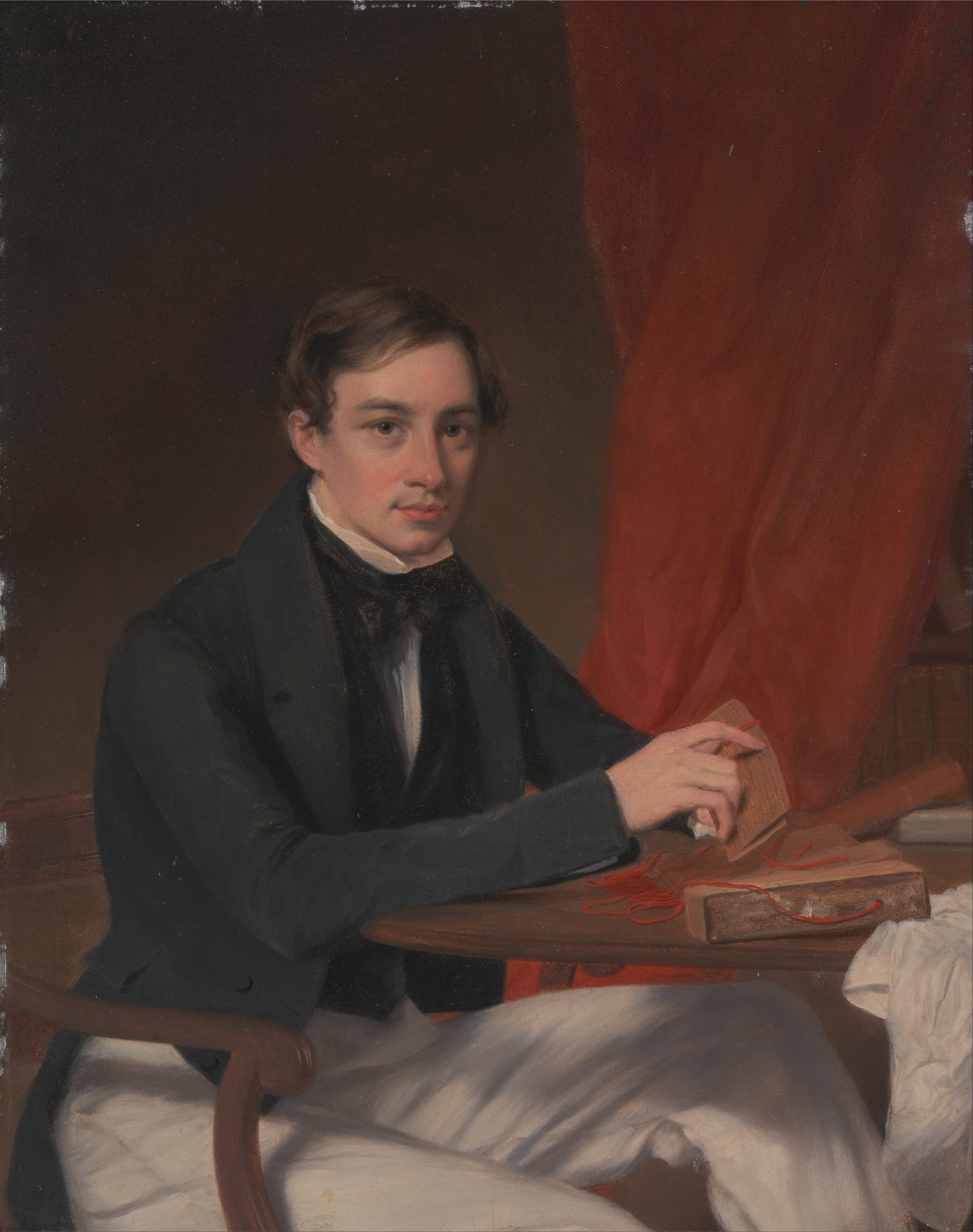
- Born: 18 October 1807; Melbourne, East Riding of Yorkshire
- Died: 9 April 1848 (aged 40); York
- Occupation: Physician

Richard Baron Howard (18 October 1807 – 9 April 1848) was an English physician.

== Biography ==
Howard was the son of Charles Howard of Hull and his wife Mary Baron of Manchester. He was born at Melbourne, East Riding of Yorkshire, on 18 Oct. 1807. He was educated at Northallerton, and in 1823 removed to the University of Edinburgh, where he obtained a surgeon's diploma. In 1829 he became a licentiate of the Apothecaries' Society in London, and took the degree of M.D. at Edinburgh. His thesis was entitled 'De Hydrocephalo Acuto.' From 1829 to 1833 he was physician's clerk in the Manchester Infirmary, and from 1833 until February 1838 acted as medical officer at the Manchester workhouse, subsequently holding the office of physician to the Ardwick and Ancoats Dispensary in the same town. During this time his work had been mainly among the poor, and his deep interest in their condition led him in 1839 to publish 'An Inquiry into the Morbid Effects of Deficiency of Food, chiefly with reference to their occurrence amongst the Destitute Poor.' In the following year, at the invitation of the poor-law commissioners, he wrote a `Report upon the prevalence of Disease arising from Contagion, Malaria, and certain other Physical Causes amongst the Labouring Classes in Manchester.' At a later period he again wrote on the same subject in J. Adshead's pamphlet on the state of the working classes in Manchester. In 1842, on being appointed physician to the infirmary, he printed 'An Address delivered to the Pupils,' &c. His other appointments were those of physician at Haydock Lodge Lunatic Asylum and lecturer at the Manchester College of Medicine. He had an extensive connection with the scientific societies of the town, where he was warmly esteemed as a lecturer, practitioner, and philanthropist. He was elected to membership of the Manchester Literary and Philosophical Society on 25 January 1842. He died at his father's house at York on 9 April 1848, after a painful illness, and was buried in the neighbouring cemetery.
