= Tower Hamlets (constituency) =

Parliamentary constituency in the United Kingdom, 1832–1885

- Former borough constituency for the House of Commons
- Form 1832-1868. Extract from 1837 result: the easternmost area in orange.
- County: Middlesex

1832–1885
- Seats: Two
- Created from: Middlesex
- Replaced by: Bow and Bromley, Limehouse, Mile End, Poplar, St George, Stepney and Whitechapel
- During its existence contributed to new seat(s) of: Hackney (constituency)

Tower Hamlets was a parliamentary borough (constituency) in Middlesex, England from 1832 to 1885. It elected two Members of Parliament (MPs) to the House of Commons of the Parliament of the United Kingdom. It was one of the first five of its type in the metropolitan area of London. It was enfranchised by the Reform Act 1832.

In its early years the borough was coterminous with the ancient Tower Hamlets, an area which covered the area of the modern London Borough of Tower Hamlets as well as Shoreditch and Hackney (the parish rather than the larger modern borough), thus extending from the edge of the City of London to the Lea. In 1868, the borough was split in two, with the southern part retaining the name.

== Boundaries ==
=== Boundaries 1832–1868 ===
The boundaries of the parliamentary borough were defined by the Parliamentary Boundaries Act 1832 as "The several Divisions of the Liberty of the Tower, and the Tower Division of Ossulston Hundred".

It comprised the following civil parishes and places:

- Bethnal Green
- Bow
- Bromley
- Hackney
- Limehouse
- Poplar
- St Botolph Without Aldgate
- St George in the East
- Shoreditch
- Spitalfields
- Tower of London
- Old Tower Without
- Wapping
- Whitechapel (part)

=== Boundaries 1868–1885 ===
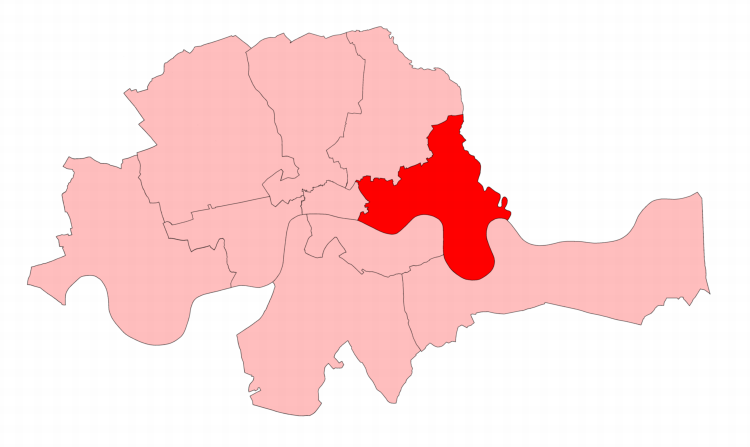
Tower Hamlets in the Metropolitan area, showing boundaries used from 1868 to 1885.

The Representation of the People Act 1867 widened the parliamentary franchise and also effected a redistribution of seats. This, along with a rapidly increasing population in the East End, resulted in the existing entity being reduced, shedding the parishes of Bethnal Green, Hackney and Shoreditch forming a separate Hackney constituency. The reformed Tower Hamlets was defined as comprising:

- The Parish of St. George's-in-the-East
- The Hamlet of Mile End Old Town
- The Poplar Union (Bow, Bromley and Poplar)
- The Stepney Union (Limehouse, Ratcliffe, Shadwell and Wapping)
- The Whitechapel Union (Holy Trinity Minories, Mile End New Town, Norton Folgate, Old Artillery Ground, St Botolph Without Aldgate, St Katherine by the Tower, Spitalfields, Whitechapel.)
- The Tower of London.

=== Redistribution ===
In 1885 the parliamentary borough was split into seven single-member divisions. These were Bow and Bromley, Limehouse, Mile End, Poplar, St George, Stepney and Whitechapel.

== Members of Parliament ==
Election	First member	First party	Second member	Second party
1832	Stephen Lushington	Whig	Sir William Clay, Bt	Radical
1841	Charles Richard Fox	Whig	Sir William Clay, Bt	Radical
1847	George Thompson	Radical	Sir William Clay, Bt	Radical
1852	Charles Salisbury Butler	Radical	Sir William Clay, Bt	Radical
1857	Charles Salisbury Butler	Radical	Rt Hon. Acton Smee Ayrton	Radical
1859	Charles Salisbury Butler	Liberal	Rt Hon. Acton Smee Ayrton	Liberal
1868	Joseph d'Aguilar Samuda	Liberal	Rt Hon. Acton Smee Ayrton	Liberal
1874	Joseph d'Aguilar Samuda	Liberal	Charles Ritchie	Conservative
1880	James Bryce	Liberal	Charles Ritchie	Conservative
1885	Constituency abolished			

== Elections ==
Turnout, in multi-member elections, is estimated by dividing the number of votes by two. To the extent that electors did not use both their votes, the figure given will be an underestimate.

Change is calculated for individual candidates, when a party had more than one candidate in an election or the previous one. When a party had only one candidate in an election and the previous one change is calculated for the party vote.

=== Elections in the 1830s ===
General election 1832: Tower Hamlets
Party	Candidate	Votes	%	±%
Whig	Stephen Lushington	3,978	31.5	N/A
Radical	William Clay	3,751	29.7	N/A
Whig	Leicester Stanhope	2,952	23.4	N/A
Whig	Frederick Marryat	1,934	15.3	N/A
Turnout		7,320	73.9	N/A
Registered electors		9,906		
Majority		227	1.8	N/A
Whig win (new seat)				
Majority		799	6.3	N/A
Radical win (new seat)				

General election 1835: Tower Hamlets
Party	Candidate	Votes	%	±%
Radical	William Clay	2,779	47.7	+18.0
Whig	Stephen Lushington	2,580	44.3	−25.9
Conservative	Ryder Burton	465	8.0	New
Turnout		2,912 (est)	30.8 (est)	−43.1
Registered electors		9,462		
Majority		199	3.4	−2.9
Radical hold		Swing	+22.0	
Majority		2,115	36.3	+34.5
Whig hold		Swing	−22.0	

General election 1837: Tower Hamlets
Party	Candidate	Votes	%	±%
Radical	William Clay	Unopposed		
Whig	Stephen Lushington	Unopposed		
Registered electors		13,318		
Radical hold				
Whig hold				

Lushington was appointed a judge of the High Court of Admiralty, requiring a by-election.

By-election, 11 February 1839: Tower Hamlets
Party	Candidate	Votes	%	±%
Whig	Stephen Lushington	Unopposed		
Whig hold				

=== Elections in the 1840s ===
General election 1841: Tower Hamlets
Party	Candidate	Votes	%	±%
Radical	William Clay	4,706	34.6	N/A
Whig	Charles Richard Fox	4,096	30.1	N/A
Conservative	George Richard Robinson	2,183	16.1	New
Whig	Andrew Kennedy Hutchinson	1,775	13.1	N/A
Radical	Thomas Edward Perronet Thompson	831	6.1	N/A
Turnout		6,796 (est)	49.1 (est)	N/A
Registered electors		13,842		
Majority		610	4.5	N/A
Radical hold		Swing	N/A	
Majority		1,913	14.0	N/A
Whig hold		Swing	N/A	

Fox was appointed Surveyor-General of the Ordnance, requiring a by-election.

By-election, 11 July 1846: Tower Hamlets
Party	Candidate	Votes	%	±%
Whig	Charles Richard Fox	Unopposed		
Whig hold				

General election 1847: Tower Hamlets
Party	Candidate	Votes	%	±%
Radical	George Thompson	6,268	49.2	+43.1
Radical	William Clay	3,839	30.2	−4.4
Whig	Charles Richard Fox	2,622	20.6	−22.6
Majority		3,646	28.6	N/A
Turnout		6,365 (est)	33.9 (est)	−15.2
Registered electors		18,748		
Radical hold		Swing	+27.2	
Radical gain from Whig		Swing	+3.5	

=== Elections in the 1850s ===
General election 1852: Tower Hamlets
Party	Candidate	Votes	%	±%
Radical	William Clay	7,728	32.3	+2.1
Radical	Charles Salisbury Butler	7,718	32.3	N/A
Radical	George Thompson	4,568	19.1	−30.1
Radical	Acton Smee Ayrton	2,792	11.7	N/A
Radical	William Newton	1,095	4.6	N/A
Majority		3,150	13.2	+3.6
Turnout		11,951 (est)	50.8 (est)	+16.9
Registered electors		23,534		
Radical hold		Swing	N/A	
Radical hold		Swing	N/A	

General election 1857: Tower Hamlets
Party	Candidate	Votes	%	±%
Radical	Acton Smee Ayrton	7,813	35.9	+24.2
Radical	Charles Salisbury Butler	7,297	33.5	+1.2
Radical	William Clay	6,654	30.6	−1.7
Majority		643	2.9	−10.3
Turnout		10,882 (est)	38.9 (est)	−11.9
Registered electors		27,980		
Radical hold		Swing	N/A	
Radical hold		Swing	N/A	

General election 1859: Tower Hamlets
Party	Candidate	Votes	%	±%
Liberal	Charles Salisbury Butler	Unopposed		
Liberal	Acton Smee Ayrton	Unopposed		
Registered electors		28,843		
Liberal hold				
Liberal hold				

=== Elections in the 1860s ===
General election 1865: Tower Hamlets
Party	Candidate	Votes	%	±%
Liberal	Charles Salisbury Butler	Unopposed		
Liberal	Acton Smee Ayrton	Unopposed		
Registered electors		34,115		
Liberal hold				
Liberal hold				

General election 1868: Tower Hamlets
Party	Candidate	Votes	%	±%
Liberal	Acton Smee Ayrton	9,839	28.0	N/A
Liberal	Joseph d'Aguilar Samuda	7,849	22.3	N/A
Conservative	Octavius Coope	7,446	21.2	New
Liberal	Edmond Beales	7,160	20.4	N/A
Lib-Lab	William Newton	2,890	8.2	N/A
Majority		403	1.1	N/A
Turnout		17,592 (est)	54.1 (est)	N/A
Registered electors		32,546		
Liberal hold		Swing	N/A	
Liberal hold		Swing	N/A	

Ayrton was appointed First Commissioner of Works, requiring a by-election.

By-election, 8 November 1869: Tower Hamlets
Party	Candidate	Votes	%	±%
Liberal	Acton Smee Ayrton	Unopposed		
Liberal hold				

=== Elections in the 1870s ===
General election 1874: Tower Hamlets
Party	Candidate	Votes	%	±%
Conservative	Charles Ritchie	7,228	29.7	+9.5
Liberal	Joseph d'Aguilar Samuda	5,900	24.2	+1.9
Liberal	Edmund Hay Currie	5,022	20.6	N/A
Liberal	Acton Smee Ayrton	3,202	13.2	−14.8
Liberal	Frederick Maxse	2,992	12.3	N/A
Majority		4,026	16.5	N/A
Turnout		15,786 (est)	47.9 (est)	−6.2
Registered electors		32,937		
Conservative gain from Liberal		Swing	+8.0	
Liberal hold		Swing	−1.4	

=== Elections in the 1880s ===
General election 1880: Tower Hamlets
Party	Candidate	Votes	%	±%
Liberal	James Bryce	12,020	30.6	N/A
Conservative	Charles Ritchie	11,720	29.9	+0.2
Liberal	Joseph d'Aguilar Samuda	10,384	26.5	+2.3
Lib-Lab	Benjamin Lucraft	5,103	13.0	N/A
Turnout		28,025 (est)	68.3 (est)	+20.4
Registered electors		41,042		
Majority		300	0.7	
Liberal hold		Swing	N/A	
Majority		1,336	3.4	−13.1
Conservative hold		Swing	−1.1	

== Sources ==
- Boundaries of Parliamentary Constituencies 1885-1972, compiled and edited by F.W.S. Craig (Parliamentary Reference Publications 1972)
- British Parliamentary Election Results 1832-1885, compiled and edited by F.W.S. Craig (Macmillan Press 1977)
- Who's Who of British Members of Parliament: Volume I 1832-1885, edited by M. Stenton (The Harvester Press 1976)
- Who's Who of British Members of Parliament, Volume II 1886-1918, edited by M. Stenton and S. Lees (Harvester Press 1978)
