= Jordans, Buckinghamshire =

Village and Quaker centre, Buckinghamshire, England

Coordinates: 51.61°N 0.59°W

Jordans
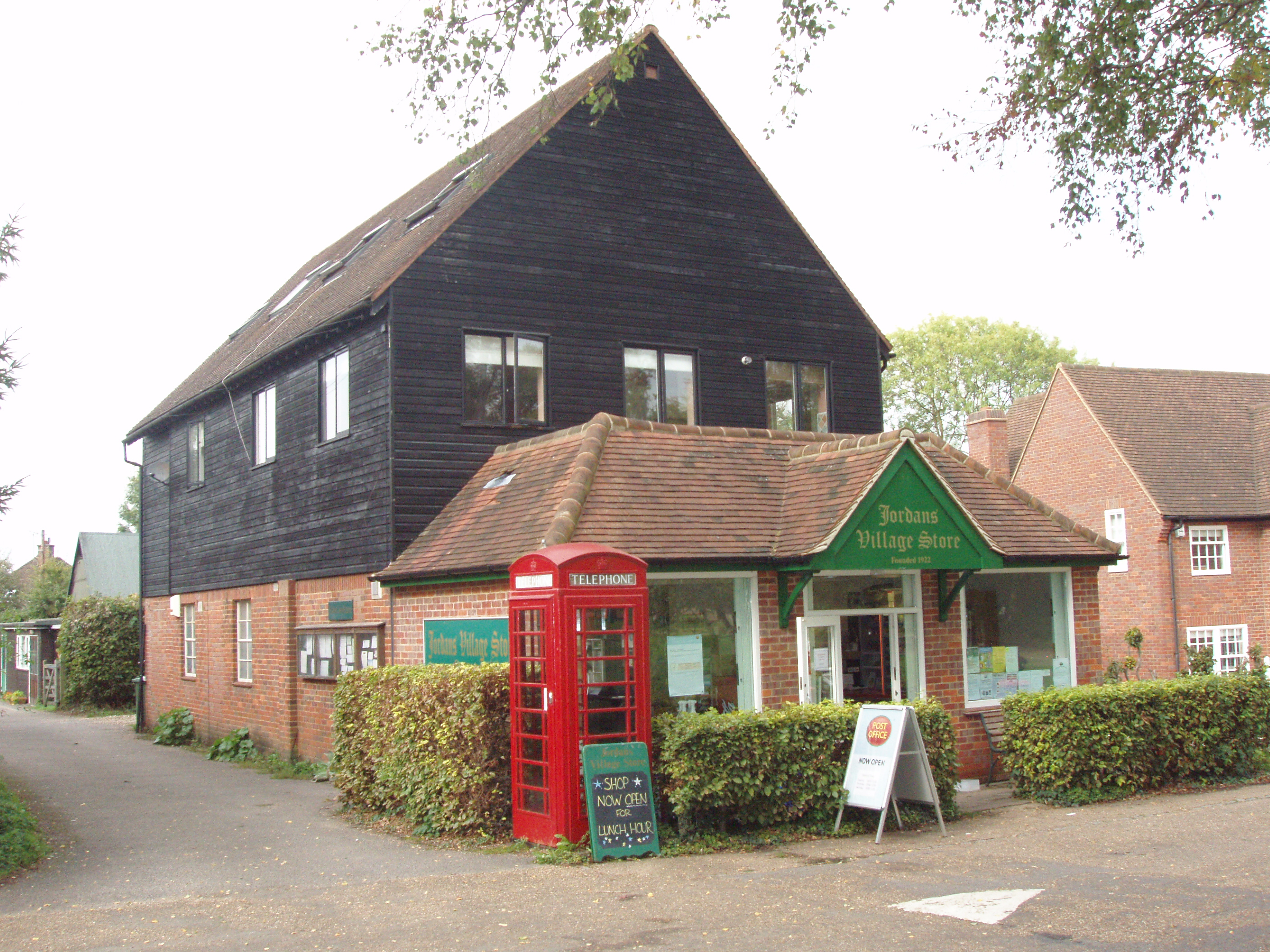
- Jordans Village Store

- Location within Buckinghamshire
- Population: 700
- OS grid reference: SU975916
- Unitary authority: Buckinghamshire
- Ceremonial county: Buckinghamshire
- Region: South East
- Country: England
- Sovereign state: United Kingdom
- Post town: BEACONSFIELD
- Postcode district: HP9
- Dialling code: 01494
- Police: Thames Valley
- Fire: Buckinghamshire
- Ambulance: South Central
- UK Parliament: Chesham & Amersham

Jordans is a village in Chalfont St Giles parish, Buckinghamshire, England, and the civil parish of Hedgerley. It is a centre for Quakerism, holds the burial place of William Penn, founder of the Province of Pennsylvania, and so is a popular place with American visitors. It also contains the Mayflower Barn, made from ship timbers sometimes claimed to be from the Mayflower. Some 245 households and 700 residents are served by a nursery, primary school, youth hostel, village hall and community shop. Forty of the houses and cottages and 21 flats are owned by a non-profit society that manages the village and its amenities.

== Heritage ==
Two of several suggested origins of the name Jordans appear in a book on the history of the village: "Little is known of Jordans Farm before the seventeenth century.... It has been suggested that the name comes from some connection with a manorial family of Jourdemain... but a more probable origin is in an early owner or occupant called Jordan." Jordans Farm is known as Old Jordans today, and that building together with the Mayflower Barn date back to the 16th century.

=== Quakerism ===
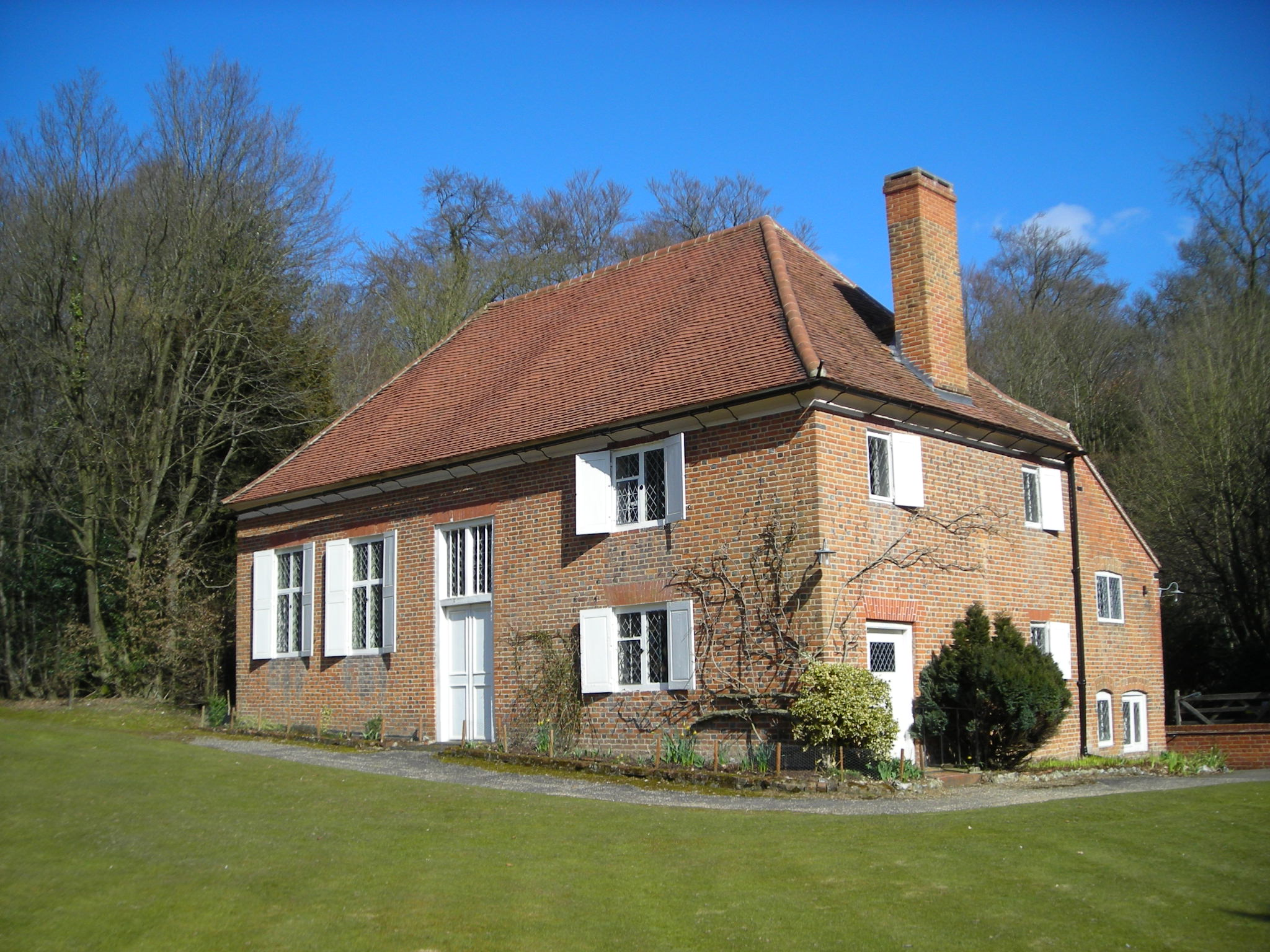
Jordans Quaker meeting house in 2013

In the 17th century the village became a centre for Quakerism. It has one of the oldest Friends meeting houses in the country, whose cemetery is the burial place of William Penn, founder of the Province of Pennsylvania, Isaac Pennington, as well as other notable Quakers. Close by is Old Jordans, originally a farmhouse, then a hostel until March 2006 when it was sold by the Quakers. Old Jordans was used during World War I as a training centre for the Friends' Ambulance Unit.

=== Meeting House ===
Jordans Friends Meeting House was built in 1688 shortly after the Declaration of Indulgence. The meeting room retains most of its original brick, including the bare brick floor, glass, panelling and benches. It suffered a serious fire on 10 March 2005, when the later extension was virtually destroyed and the roof of the original 17th-century meeting room severely damaged. The interior of the original meeting room escaped relatively unscathed, but suffered some water and smoke damage. The extension was rebuilt, modernised.

=== Mayflower Barn ===
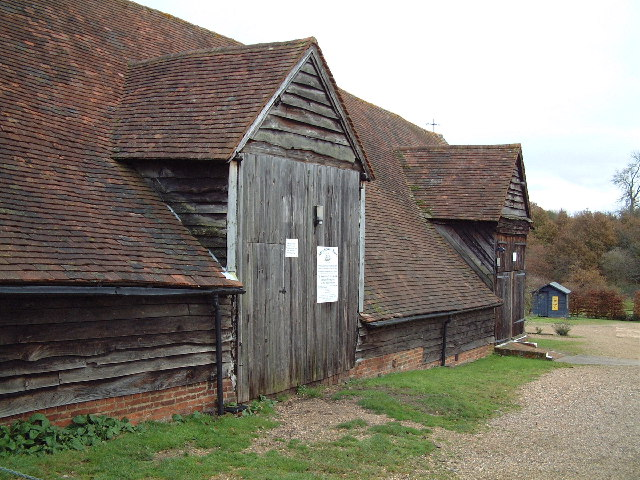
Mayflower Barn

Within the grounds of Old Jordans is the Mayflower Barn on the edge of the Chiltern hills, about a third of the way between London and Oxford.

The farm name seems to date back to the late Middle Ages. Its known history begins in 1618 when Thomas Russell bought it. Part of the present farmhouse was already there and Thomas Russell added to it in 1624, also building a substantial new barn with timbers from a ship. Despite suppositions, it cannot be shown that they came from the Mayflower, the ship that carried the Pilgrim Fathers from Plymouth to New England.

A piece of the timber was taken from the Mayflower Barn, placed in the Peace Arch built by Sam Hill and opened in September 1921. Besides the completion of the Pacific highway from the Canadian boundary to Mexico, the arch also marked a century of peace between the United States and the British Empire (which included Canada). A plaque shows where the timber was taken from the Mayflower Barn. The Barn was a tourist attraction to visitors, particularly the Americas, but is now privately owned and closed to the public.

== Education ==
Jordans has a primary school, Jordans County First School, and Jordan's Village Nursery School. The school, in Puers Lane, is state-funded, for years 1, 2 and Reception (Ages 5–8) as a feeder for Seer Green School, Thorpe House School and Gayhurst School. It has about 60 pupils with a student/teacher ratio of 1:12. The head since 2015 has been Hannah Bancroft.

The nursery is in the Village Hall behind the store in Green West Road.

== Transport ==
Jordans lies 5 miles (8.0 km) north-west of the intersection of the M25 and M40 motorways (Junction 16/1A). It is served by Seer Green and Jordans railway station, 1.2 miles (1.9 km) away on the London–Birmingham Chiltern Main Line of Chiltern Railways. Jordans is served on Tuesday and Friday by a bus service from the village to the Tesco in Loudwater. (380, Red Eagle).

== Leisure and amenities ==
Jordans has a "pop-up pub" named The Jolly Quaker, open on the first Friday of each month. Its monthly Cinema Club "Jordans Picture House" opens on the second and fourth Friday of the month from October to May. Both operate from the village hall in Green West Road behind the village store.

Several annual events take place: a summer fair, usually in June; a sports day; and a village supper to commemorate the founding of the village on the nearest Saturday to its anniversary each February. The Jordans Tennis Club in the village holds about seven roll-ups each year. In June 2019, the village marked its centenary with an event on the village green.

Jordans Village Community Store opened in 1922. It sells the usual staples and some own-brand preserves, and includes a sub-post office usually on Thursday morning. It is subsidized by a voluntary Shop Amenity Charge of £5 or £10 per month paid by about half the households in the village.

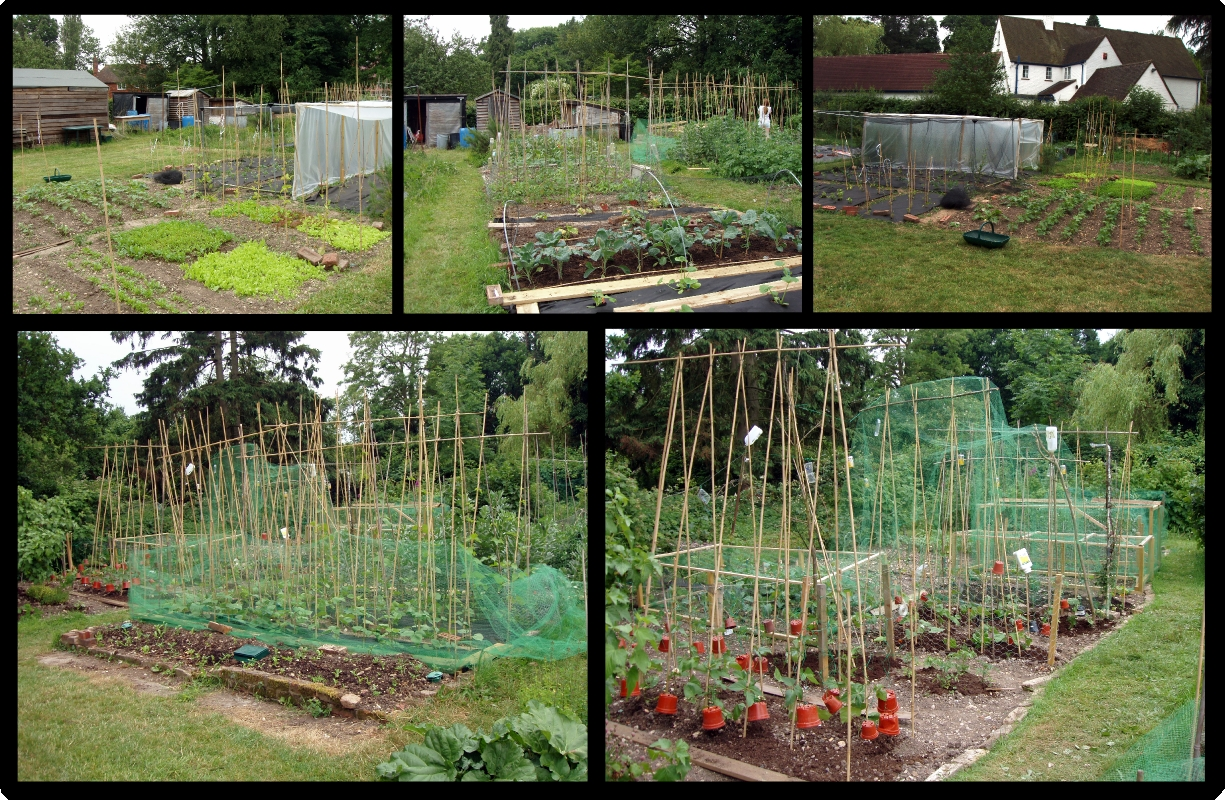
Five views of the allotments

Jordans has eight allotments, located next to the tennis court. The allotments used to be located in Crutches Lane, and were moved to allow a development of four homes for the elderly, built in 2008.

== Notable residents ==
In birth order:

- William Penn (1644–1718) was a Quaker convert, who founded Philadelphia, but died penniless and is buried in Jordans.
- Frederick Forsyth (1938–2025), author of The Day of the Jackal, lived in and died in Jordans.
- Ozzy (1948–2025) and Sharon Osbourne (born 1952) have a mansion, Welders House, in the village. Ozzy Osbourne is buried in the grounds of the mansion.
- Steve Soper (born 1951), is a racing driver dubbed by Motorsport Magazine "the greatest saloon car driver of all time".
- Bill Turnbull (1956–2022), a BBC news anchorman, was a former resident.
- Justin Sullivan (born 1956), front man and songwriter with the band New Model Army, was born in Jordans.
