= Members of the 1st Dáil =

TDs from 1918 to 1921

First Dáil
2nd Dáil	→
- 24 of the 27 TDs present at the First Dáil meeting on 21 January 1919, photographed afterwards on the steps of the Mansion House. The caption gives names in Irish.

Overview
- Legislative body: Dáil Éireann
- Jurisdiction: Irish Republic
- Meeting place: Mansion House; UCD (Earlsfort Terrace)
- Term: 21 January 1919 – 10 May 1921
- Election: 1918 general election
- Government: 1st Dáil ministry (until 22 January 1919); 2nd Dáil ministry (1919–1922)
- Members: 105 (Note: Sinn Féin won 73 of 105 constituencies but four individuals were each elected for two constituencies, so there were 69 Sinn Féin MPs from a total of 101.)
- Ceann Comhairle: Seán T. O'Kelly — Count Plunkett; 22 January 1919 — Cathal Brugha until 22 January 1919
- President of Dáil Éireann: Éamon de Valera — Cathal Brugha until 1 April 1919

The members of the First Dáil, known as Teachtaí Dála (TDs), were the Members of Parliament (MPs) returned from the 105 Irish seats at the 1918 United Kingdom general election. In its first general election, Sinn Féin won 73 seats and viewed the result as a mandate for independence; in accordance with its manifesto policy of abstentionism, its 69 MPs refused to attend the British House of Commons in Westminster, and established a revolutionary parliament known as Dáil Éireann. The other Irish MPs — 26 unionists and six (Note: A seventh IPP MP, T. P. O'Connor, was elected for the English constituency of Liverpool Scotland.) from the Irish Parliamentary Party (IPP) — sat at Westminster and for the most part ignored the invitation to attend the Dáil. Thomas Harbison, IPP MP for North East Tyrone, did acknowledge the invitation, but "stated he should decline for obvious reasons". The Dáil met for the first time on 21 January 1919 in Mansion House in Dublin. Only 27 members attended; most of the other Sinn Féin TDs were imprisoned by the British authorities, or in hiding under threat of arrest. All 101 MPs were considered TDs, and their names were called out on the roll of membership, though there was some laughter when Irish Unionist Alliance leader Edward Carson was described as as láthair ("absent"). The database of members of the Oireachtas (Irish parliament) includes for the First Dáil only those elected for Sinn Féin.

== Composition of the First Dáil ==
Party		Dec. 1918 (Note: December 1918 column shows the state of parties after the 1918 general election.)	May 1921 (Note: May 1921 column shows the state of the parties at the dissolution of the First Dáil.)
●	Sinn Féin	73	69
	Irish Unionist	22	—N/a
	Irish Parliamentary	6	2
	Labour Unionist	3	—N/a
	Ind. Unionist	1	1
	UUP	—N/a	23
	Nationalist	—N/a	4
	Unionist Anti-Partition League	—N/a	2
	Vacant	—N/a	4
Total		105	

Government party denoted with bullet (●).

== Members by constituency ==
Constituency	Name	Portrait	Party affiliation		Assumed office
Constituency	Name	Portrait	Start of Dáil term	End of Dáil term	Assumed office
Antrim East	Robert McCalmont		Irish Unionist	Resigned in 1919	Sat as MP
Antrim East	George Hanna		Elected in 1919 by-election as Independent Unionist	Ulster Unionist	Sat as MP
Antrim Mid	Hugh O'Neill		Irish Unionist	Ulster Unionist	Sat as MP
Antrim North	Peter Kerr-Smiley		Irish Unionist	Ulster Unionist	Sat as MP
Antrim South	Charles Craig		Irish Unionist	Ulster Unionist	Sat as MP
Armagh Mid	James Lonsdale		Irish Unionist	Ulster Unionist	Sat as MP
Armagh North	William Allen		Irish Unionist	Ulster Unionist	Sat as MP
Armagh South	Patrick Donnelly		Irish Parliamentary	Nationalist	Sat as MP
Belfast Cromac	William Arthur Lindsay		Irish Unionist	Ulster Unionist	Sat as MP
Belfast Duncairn	Edward Carson		Irish Unionist	Ulster Unionist	Sat as MP
Belfast Falls	Joseph Devlin		Irish Parliamentary	Nationalist	Sat as MP
Belfast Ormeau	Thomas Moles		Irish Unionist	Ulster Unionist	Sat as MP
Belfast Pottinger	Herbert Dixon		Irish Unionist	Ulster Unionist	Sat as MP
Belfast St Anne's	Thomas Henry Burn		Labour Unionist	Ulster Unionist	Sat as MP
Belfast Shankill	Samuel McGuffin		Labour Unionist	Ulster Unionist	Sat as MP
Belfast Victoria	Thompson Donald		Labour Unionist	Ulster Unionist	Sat as MP
Belfast Woodvale	Robert Lynn		Irish Unionist	Ulster Unionist	Sat as MP
County Carlow	James Lennon		Sinn Féin		6 August 1920
Cavan East	Arthur Griffith (Note: Arthur Griffith was elected for two constituencies: Cavan East and Tyrone North West.)		Sinn Féin		1 April 1919
Tyrone North West	Arthur Griffith		Sinn Féin		1 April 1919
Cavan West	Peter Paul Galligan		Sinn Féin		1 April 1919
Clare East	Éamon de Valera (Note: Éamon de Valera was elected for two constituencies: Clare East and Mayo East.)		Sinn Féin		1 April 1919
Mayo East	Éamon de Valera		Sinn Féin		1 April 1919
Clare West	Brian O'Higgins		Sinn Féin		1 April 1919
Cork City	Liam de Róiste		Sinn Féin		1 April 1919
Cork City	J. J. Walsh (Note: Attended the opening session of the First Dáil on 21 January 1919.)		Sinn Féin		21 January 1919
Cork East	David Kent		Sinn Féin		9 May 1919
Cork Mid	Terence MacSwiney		Sinn Féin	Died in 1920	1 April 1919
Cork North	Patrick O'Keeffe		Sinn Féin		1 April 1919
Cork North East	Thomas Hunter		Sinn Féin		9 May 1919
Cork South	Michael Collins		Sinn Féin		1 April 1919
Cork South East	Diarmuid Lynch		Sinn Féin	Resigned in 1920	Never sat in Dáil
Cork West	Seán Hayes		Sinn Féin		21 January 1919
Donegal East	Edward Kelly		Irish Parliamentary		Sat as MP
Donegal North	Joseph O'Doherty		Sinn Féin		21 January 1919
Donegal South	Peter Ward		Sinn Féin		21 January 1919
Donegal West	Joseph Sweeney		Sinn Féin		21 January 1919
Down East	David Reid		Irish Unionist	Ulster Unionist	Sat as MP
Down Mid	James Craig		Irish Unionist	Ulster Unionist	Sat as MP
Down North	Thomas Watters Brown		Irish Unionist	Ulster Unionist	Sat as MP
Down South	Jeremiah McVeagh		Irish Parliamentary	Nationalist	Sat as MP
Down West	Daniel Martin Wilson		Irish Unionist	Ulster Unionist	Sat as MP
Dublin Clontarf	Richard Mulcahy		Sinn Féin		21 January 1919
Dublin College Green	Seán T. O'Kelly		Sinn Féin		21 January 1919
Dublin Harbour	Philip Shanahan		Sinn Féin		21 January 1919
Dublin North	Frank Lawless		Sinn Féin		1 April 1919
Dublin Pembroke	Desmond FitzGerald		Sinn Féin		1 April 1919
Dublin Rathmines	Maurice Dockrell		Irish Unionist	Unionist Anti-Partition League	Sat as MP
Dublin South	George Gavan Duffy		Sinn Féin		21 January 1919
Dublin St James's	Joseph McGrath		Sinn Féin		1 April 1919
Dublin St Michan's	Michael Staines		Sinn Féin		21 January 1919
Dublin St Patrick's	Constance Markievicz		Sinn Féin		1 April 1919
Dublin St Stephen's Green	Thomas Kelly		Sinn Féin		21 January 1919
Dublin University	Arthur Samuels		Irish Unionist	Resigned in 1919	Sat as MP
Dublin University	Robert Woods		Independent Unionist		Sat as MP
Dublin University	William Jellett		Elected in 1919 by-election as Irish Unionist	Unionist Anti-Partition League	Sat as MP
Fermanagh North	Edward Archdale		Irish Unionist	Ulster Unionist	Sat as MP
Fermanagh South	Seán O'Mahony		Sinn Féin		1 April 1919
Galway Connemara	Pádraic Ó Máille		Sinn Féin		21 January 1919
Galway East	Liam Mellows (Note: Liam Mellows was elected for two constituencies: Galway East and Meath North.)		Sinn Féin		21 January 1921
Meath North	Liam Mellows		Sinn Féin		21 January 1921
Galway North	Bryan Cusack		Sinn Féin		1 April 1919
Galway South	Frank Fahy		Sinn Féin		1 April 1919
Kerry East	Piaras Béaslaí		Sinn Féin		21 January 1919
Kerry North	James Crowley		Sinn Féin		17 June 1919
Kerry South	Fionán Lynch		Sinn Féin		29 June 1920
Kerry West	Austin Stack		Sinn Féin		Never sat in First Dáil
Kildare North	Domhnall Ua Buachalla		Sinn Féin		21 January 1919
Kildare South	Art O'Connor		Sinn Féin		1 April 1919
Kilkenny North	W. T. Cosgrave		Sinn Féin		1 April 1919
Kilkenny South	James O'Mara		Sinn Féin		1 April 1919
King's County	Patrick McCartan		Sinn Féin		Never sat in First Dáil
County Leitrim	James Dolan		Sinn Féin		1 April 1919
Limerick City	Michael Colivet		Sinn Féin		1 April 1919
Limerick East	Richard Hayes		Sinn Féin		1 April 1919
Limerick West	Con Collins		Sinn Féin		21 January 1919
Londonderry City	Eoin MacNeill (Note: Eoin MacNeill was elected for two constituencies: Londonderry City and National University of Ireland.)		Sinn Féin		21 January 1919
National University	Eoin MacNeill		Sinn Féin		21 January 1919
Londonderry North	Hugh Anderson		Irish Unionist	Resigned in 1919	Sat as MP
Londonderry North	Hugh T. Barrie		Elected in 1919 by-election as Irish Unionist	Ulster Unionist	Sat as MP
Londonderry South	Denis Henry		Irish Unionist	Ulster Unionist	Sat as MP
County Longford	Joseph McGuinness		Sinn Féin		1 April 1919
Louth	John J. O'Kelly		Sinn Féin		21 January 1919
Mayo North	John Crowley		Sinn Féin		21 January 1919
Mayo South	William Sears		Sinn Féin		19 August 1919
Mayo West	Joseph MacBride		Sinn Féin		17 June 1919
Meath South	Eamonn Duggan		Sinn Féin		21 January 1919
Monaghan North	Ernest Blythe		Sinn Féin		1 April 1919
Monaghan South	Seán MacEntee		Sinn Féin		1 April 1919
Queen's County	Kevin O'Higgins		Sinn Féin		21 January 1919
Roscommon North	George Noble Plunkett		Sinn Féin		21 January 1919
Roscommon South	Harry Boland		Sinn Féin		1 April 1919
Queen's University of Belfast	William Whitla		Irish Unionist	Ulster Unionist	Sat as MP
Sligo North	J. J. Clancy		Sinn Féin		29 June 1920
Sligo South	Alexander McCabe		Sinn Féin		1 April 1919
Tipperary East	Pierce McCan		Sinn Féin	Died in 1919	Never sat in Dáil
Tipperary Mid	Séamus Burke		Sinn Féin		21 January 1919
Tipperary North	Joseph MacDonagh		Sinn Féin		1 April 1919
Tipperary South	P. J. Moloney		Sinn Féin		21 January 1919
Tyrone North East	Thomas Harbison		Irish Parliamentary	Nationalist	Sat as MP
Tyrone South	William Coote		Irish Unionist	Ulster Unionist	Sat as MP
Waterford City	William Redmond		Irish Parliamentary		Sat as MP
Waterford County	Cathal Brugha		Sinn Féin		21 January 1919
County Westmeath	Laurence Ginnell		Sinn Féin		1 April 1919
Wexford North	Roger Sweetman		Sinn Féin	Resigned in 1921	21 January 1919
Wexford South	James Ryan		Sinn Féin		21 January 1919
Wicklow East	Seán Etchingham		Sinn Féin		1 April 1919
Wicklow West	Robert Barton		Sinn Féin		21 January 1919

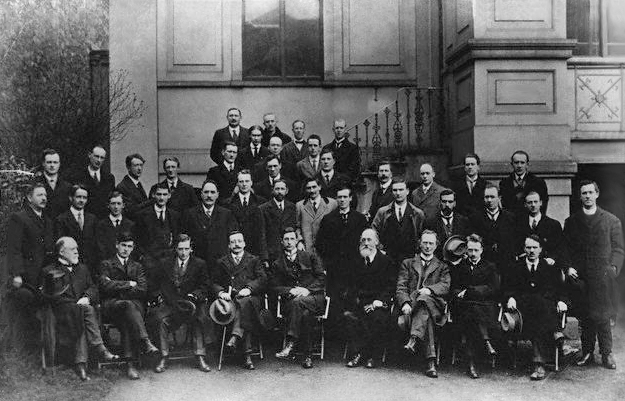
Photograph of members of the First Dáil of the Irish Republic, taken on the steps of the Mansion House in Dublin on 9 April 1919.

== Changes ==
=== Vacancies ===
When the Sinn Féin executive met on 1 January 1919 to plan for the Dáil's inaugural meeting, it considered appointing substitutes for the imprisoned Sinn Féin TDs who would be unable to attend, but decided against this. When Pierce McCan died on 6 March 1919, his East Tipperary seat was left vacant at Westminster. In April 1919 a Dáil committee considering how to fill the vacancy considered allowing nomination by the Labour Party (which had stood aside in the 1918 election to avoid splitting the nationalist vote) before recommending that the Sinn Féin constituency organisation should nominate. However, in June 1919 the Dáil decided that "it was due to the memory of the late Pierce McCann that his place should not be filled at present". Later vacancies were also left unfilled; when Diarmuid Lynch resigned his seat in 1920, Arthur Griffith said "as the letter of resignation was addressed to the people of South-East Cork, the next step in the matter lay with the South-East Cork Executive of Sinn Fein".

Four TDs represented two separate constituencies: Éamon de Valera, Arthur Griffith, Eoin MacNeill and Liam Mellowes. Ordinarily, this would prompt them to choose one constituency to represent, and to move a writ for a by-election in the other constituency.

Constituency	Outgoing TD	Party	Reason for vacancy	Date of vacancy	Ref
Tipperary East	Pierce McCan	Sinn Féin	Death in prison	6 March 1919	
Cork South East	Diarmuid Lynch	Sinn Féin	Resignation	6 August 1920	
Cork Mid	Terence MacSwiney	Sinn Féin	Death from hunger strike	25 October 1920	
North Wexford	Roger Sweetman	Sinn Féin	Resignation	27 January 1921	

=== By-elections ===
The following Westminster by-elections to Irish seats were filled by Unionists who sat at Westminster.

Winner	Party	Constituency	Date	Outgoing	Party	Reason for vacancy	Notes
Hugh T. Barrie	Irish Unionist	North Londonderry	4 March 1919	Hugh Anderson	Irish Unionist	Resignation	The only by-election contested by Sinn Féin, Patrick McGilligan losing.
George Hanna	Ind. Unionist	East Antrim	27 May 1919	Robert McCalmont	Irish Unionist	Appointed commander of the Irish Guards	
William Jellett	Irish Unionist	Dublin University	28 July 1919	Arthur Samuels	Irish Unionist	Appointed to the High Court of Justice in Ireland	

== See also ==
- Historic Dáil constituencies
