= Lloyd George ministry =

Government of the United Kingdom from 1916 to 1922

Lloyd George ministries
- 1916–1918; 1918–1922
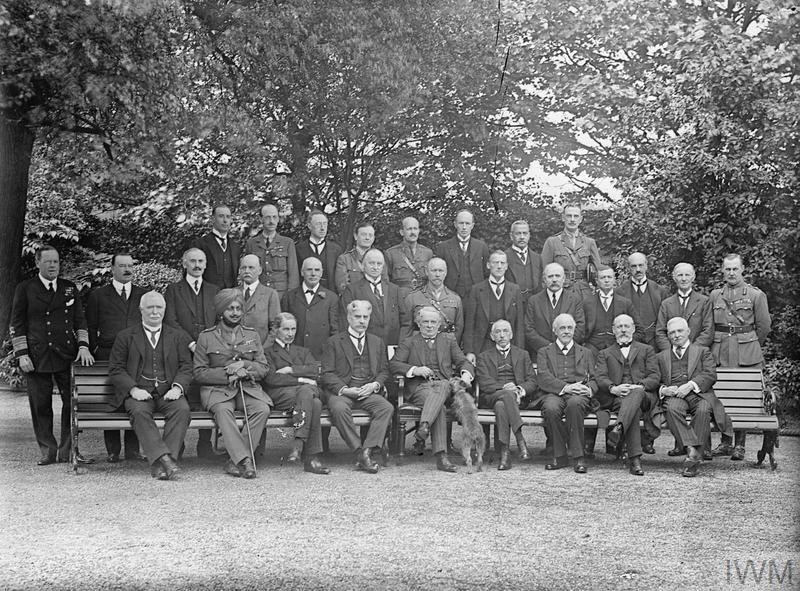
- Lloyd George’s Imperial War Cabinet in 1918
- Date formed: First: 6 December 1916; Second: 14 December 1918
- Date dissolved: First: 14 December 1918; Second: 19 October 1922

People and organisations
- Monarch: George V
- Prime Minister: David Lloyd George
- Prime Minister's history: 1916–1922
- Total no. of members: 269 appointments
- Member parties: Conservative Party; Labour Party (1916–1918); Coalition Liberal (1916–1922); National Liberal (1922)
- Status in legislature: Majority (coalition)
- Opposition party: Liberal Party
- Opposition leaders: H. H. Asquith (1916–1918); Sir Donald Maclean (1918–1920); H. H. Asquith (1920–1922) in the House of Commons; Lord Crewe in the House of Lords

History
- Outgoing formation: Carlton Club meeting
- Election: 1918 general election
- Legislature terms: 30th UK Parliament; 31st UK Parliament
- Predecessor: Asquith coalition ministry
- Successor: Law ministry

Liberal David Lloyd George formed a coalition government in the United Kingdom in December 1916, and was appointed Prime Minister of the United Kingdom by King George V. It replaced the earlier wartime coalition under H. H. Asquith, which had been held responsible for losses during the Great War. Those Liberals who continued to support Asquith served as the Official Opposition. The government continued in power after the end of the war in 1918, though Lloyd George was increasingly reliant on the Conservatives for support. After several scandals including allegations of the sale of honours, the Conservatives withdrew their support after a meeting at the Carlton Club in 1922, and Bonar Law formed a government.

== Cabinets ==
=== War Cabinet, December 1916 – January 1919 ===
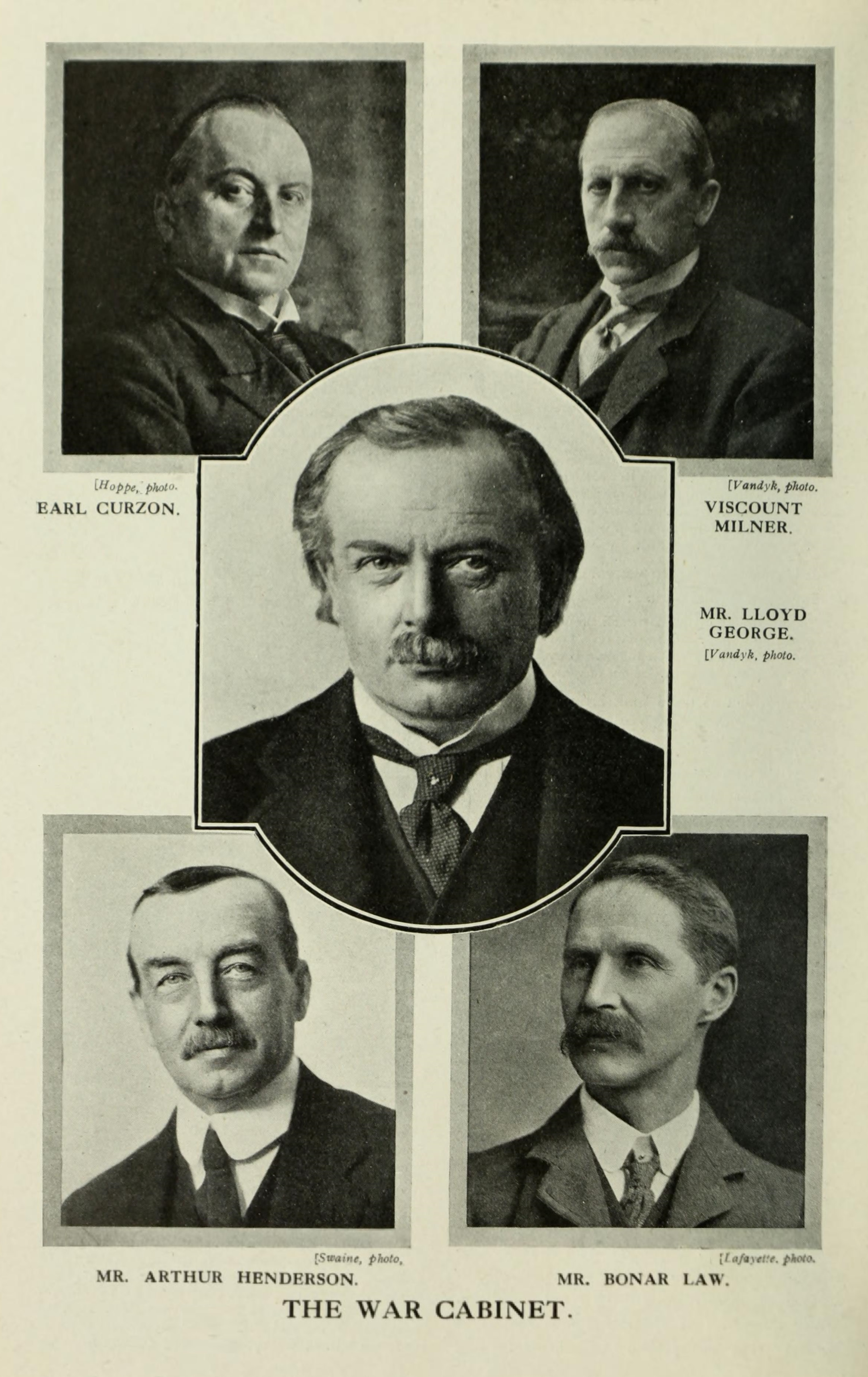
The 1916 War Cabinet

- George Curzon, 1st Earl Curzon of Kedleston – Lord President of the Council and Leader of the House of Lords
- Bonar Law – Chancellor of the Exchequer and Leader of the House of Commons
- Arthur Henderson – Minister without Portfolio
- Alfred Milner, 1st Viscount Milner – Minister without Portfolio

==== Changes ====
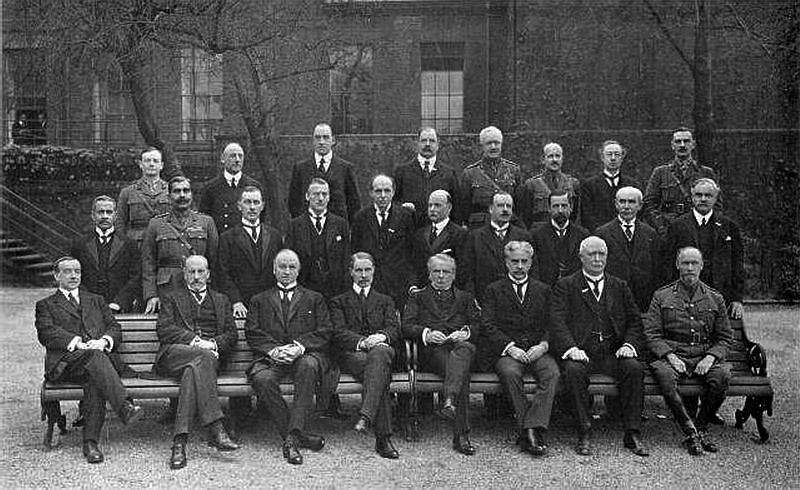
The 1917 Imperial War Cabinet

- May – August 1917 – In temporary absence of Arthur Henderson, George Barnes, Minister of Pensions acts as a member of the War Cabinet.
- June 1917 – Jan Smuts enters the War Cabinet as a Minister without Portfolio
- July 1917 – Sir Edward Carson enters the War Cabinet as a Minister without Portfolio
- August 1917 – George Barnes succeeds Arthur Henderson (resigned) as Minister without Portfolio and Labour Party member of the War Cabinet.
- January 1918 – Carson resigns and is not replaced
- April 1918 – Austen Chamberlain succeeds Lord Milner as Minister without Portfolio.
- January 1919 – Law becomes Lord Privy Seal, remaining Leader of the House of Commons, and is succeeded as Chancellor of the Exchequer by Chamberlain; both remaining in the War Cabinet. Smuts is succeeded by Sir Eric Geddes as Minister without Portfolio.

=== Peacetime Cabinet, January 1919 – October 1922 ===
Note: The War Cabinet was formally maintained for much of 1919, but as Lloyd George was out of the country for many months this made little difference; in October 1919 a formal Cabinet was reinstated.

- David Lloyd George – Prime Minister
- F.E Smith, 1st Baron Birkenhead – Lord Chancellor
- George Curzon, 1st Earl Curzon of Kedleston – Lord President of the Council and Leader of the House of Lords
- Bonar Law – Lord Privy Seal and Leader of the House of Commons
- Austen Chamberlain – Chancellor of the Exchequer
- Edward Shortt – Secretary of State for the Home Department
- Arthur Balfour – Secretary of State for Foreign Affairs
- Alfred Milner, 1st Viscount Milner – Secretary of State for the Colonies
- Winston Churchill – Secretary of State for War and Air
- Edwin Montagu – Secretary of State for India
- Walter Long – First Lord of the Admiralty
- Sir Albert Stanley – President of the Board of Trade
- Robert Munro – Secretary for Scotland
- Ian Macpherson – Chief Secretary for Ireland
- John French, 1st Viscount French – Lord-Lieutenant of Ireland
- Christopher Addison – President of the Local Government Board
- Rowland Prothero – President of the Board of Agriculture
- H. A. L. Fisher – President of the Board of Education
- Andrew Weir, 1st Baron Inverforth – Minister of Munitions
- Sir Robert Horne – Minister of Labour
- George Barnes – Minister without Portfolio
- Sir Eric Geddes – Minister without Portfolio

==== Changes ====
- May 1919 – Sir Auckland Geddes succeeds Sir Albert Stanley as President of the Board of Trade. Sir Eric Geddes becomes Minister of Transport.
- October 1919 – Lord Curzon of Kedleston succeeds Balfour as Foreign Secretary. Balfour succeeds Curzon as Lord President. The Local Government Board is abolished. Christopher Addison becomes Minister of Health. The Board of Agriculture is abolished. Lord Lee of Fareham becomes Minister of Agriculture. Sir Eric Geddes becomes Minister of Transport.
- January 1920 – George Barnes leaves the cabinet.
- March 1920 – Sir Robert Horne succeeds Sir Auckland Geddes as President of the Board of Trade. Thomas James McNamara succeeds Horne as Minister of Labour.
- April 1920 – Sir Hamar Greenwood succeeds Ian Macpherson as Chief Secretary for Ireland. Sir Laming Worthington-Evans joins the Cabinet as Minister without Portfolio.
- February 1921 – Winston Churchill succeeds Lord Milner as Colonial Secretary. Sir Laming Worthington-Evans succeeds Churchill as War Secretary. Churchill's successor as Air Secretary was not in the Cabinet. Lord Lee of Fareham succeeds Walter Long at the Admiralty. Sir Arthur Griffith-Boscawen succeeds Lee as Minister of Agriculture.
- March 1921 – Austen Chamberlain succeeds Bonar Law as Lord Privy Seal and Leader of the Commons. Sir Robert Horne succeeds Chamberlain at the Exchequer. Stanley Baldwin succeeds Horne at the Board of Trade.
- April 1921 – Lord French resigns from the cabinet, remaining Lord Lieutenant. Christopher Addison becomes a Minister without Portfolio. Sir Alfred Mond succeeds him as Minister of Health. The Ministry of Munitions is abolished.
- November 1921 – Sir Eric Geddes resigns from the cabinet. His successor as Minister of Transport is not in the Cabinet. The Attorney General, Sir Gordon Hewart, enters the Cabinet.
- March 1922 – William Peel, 2nd Viscount Peel succeeds Edwin Montagu as India Secretary.
- April 1922 – The First Commissioner of Works, David Lindsay, 27th Earl of Crawford, enters the Cabinet.

== List of ministers ==
Members of the Cabinet are listed in boldface. Members of the War Cabinet, 6 December 1916 to 31 October 1919, are indicated.

Key
Conservative Liberal Labour

| Office | Name | Date | Party | Notes |
|---|---|---|---|---|
| Prime Minister and First Lord of the Treasury | **David Lloyd George** | 6 December 1916 – 19 October 1922 | Liberal | In the War Cabinet 6 December 1916 – 31 October 1919 |
| Chancellor of the Exchequer | **Bonar Law** | 10 December 1916 | Conservative | Also Leader of the House of Commons; in the War Cabinet since 6 December 1916 |
| Chancellor of the Exchequer | **Austen Chamberlain** | 10 January 1919 | Conservative | Left the War Cabinet 31 October 1919 |
| Chancellor of the Exchequer | **Sir Robert Horne** | 1 April 1921 | Conservative | |
| Financial Secretaries to the Treasury | Sir Hardman Lever | 15 December 1916 – 19 May 1919 | Liberal | |
| Financial Secretaries to the Treasury | Stanley Baldwin | 18 June 1917 – 1 April 1921 | Conservative | |
| Financial Secretaries to the Treasury | Hilton Young | 21 April 1921 – 19 October 1922 | Liberal | |
| Parliamentary Secretaries to the Treasury and Government Chief Whips in the House of Commons | Lord Edmund Talbot | 14 December 1916 – 1 April 1921 | Conservative | |
| Parliamentary Secretaries to the Treasury and Government Chief Whips in the House of Commons | Neil Primrose | 14 December 1916 – 2 March 1917 | Liberal | |
| Parliamentary Secretaries to the Treasury and Government Chief Whips in the House of Commons | Frederick Guest | 2 March 1917 – 1 April 1921 | Liberal | |
| Parliamentary Secretaries to the Treasury and Government Chief Whips in the House of Commons | Charles McCurdy | 1 April 1921 – 19 October 1922 | Liberal | |
| Parliamentary Secretaries to the Treasury and Government Chief Whips in the House of Commons | Leslie Orme Wilson | 1 April 1921 – 19 October 1922 | Conservative | |
| Junior Lords of the Treasury | James Hope | 14 December 1916 – 27 January 1919 | Conservative | |
| Junior Lords of the Treasury | John Pratt | 14 December 1916 – 8 August 1919 | Liberal | |
| Junior Lords of the Treasury | Stanley Baldwin | 29 January 1917 – 18 June 1917 | Conservative | |
| Junior Lords of the Treasury | James Parker | 29 January 1917 – 19 October 1922 | Labour | |
| Junior Lords of the Treasury | Josiah Towyn Jones | 29 January 1917 – 4 July 1922 | Liberal | |
| Junior Lords of the Treasury | Robert Sanders | 5 February 1919 – 1 April 1921 | Conservative | Created a Baronet 28 January 1920 |
| Junior Lords of the Treasury | Sir Godfrey Collins | 8 August 1919 – 10 February 1920 | Liberal | |
| Junior Lords of the Treasury | William Edge | 18 August 1919 – 1 August 1922 | Liberal | |
| Junior Lords of the Treasury | Sir William Sutherland | 15 February 1920 – 7 April 1922 | Liberal | |
| Junior Lords of the Treasury | Sir John Gilmour, 2nd Baronet | 1 April 1921 – 19 October 1922 | Conservative | |
| Junior Lords of the Treasury | Thomas Arthur Lewis | 4 July 1922 – 26 July 1922 | Liberal | |
| Lord Chancellor | **Robert Finlay, 1st Baron Finlay** | 10 December 1916 | Conservative | |
| Lord Chancellor | **F. E. Smith, 1st Baron Birkenhead** | 10 January 1919 | Conservative | Created Viscount Birkenhead 15 June 1921 |
| Lord President of the Council | **George Curzon, 1st Earl Curzon of Kedleston** | 10 December 1916 | Conservative | Also Leader of the House of Lords; in the War Cabinet since 6 December 1916 |
| Lord President of the Council | **Arthur Balfour** | 23 October 1919 | Conservative | |
| Lord Privy Seal | **David Lindsay, 27th Earl of Crawford** | 15 December 1916 | Conservative | |
| Lord Privy Seal | **Bonar Law** | 10 January 1919 | Conservative | Also Leader of the House of Commons; left the War Cabinet 31 October 1919 |
| Lord Privy Seal | **Austen Chamberlain** | 23 March 1921 | Conservative | Also Leader of the House of Commons |
| Secretary of State for Foreign Affairs | **Arthur Balfour** | 10 December 1916 | Conservative | |
| Secretary of State for Foreign Affairs | **George Curzon, 1st Earl Curzon of Kedleston** | 23 October 1919 | Conservative | Also Leader of the House of Lords; left the War Cabinet 31 October 1919; created Marquess Curzon of Kedleston 28 June 1921 |
| Under-Secretary of State for Foreign Affairs | Lord Robert Cecil | 10 December 1916 | Conservative | |
| Under-Secretary of State for Foreign Affairs | Cecil Harmsworth | 10 January 1919 | Liberal | |
| Assistant Under-Secretary of State for Foreign Affairs | Thomas Legh, 2nd Baron Newton | 10 December 1916 | Conservative | Post abolished 10 January 1919 |
| Secretary of State for the Home Department | **Sir George Cave** | 10 December 1916 | Conservative | Created Viscount Cave 14 November 1918 |
| Secretary of State for the Home Department | **Edward Shortt** | 10 January 1919 | Liberal | |
| Under-Secretary of State for the Home Department | William Brace | 10 December 1916 | Labour | |
| Under-Secretary of State for the Home Department | Sir Hamar Greenwood | 10 January 1919 | Liberal | |
| Under-Secretary of State for the Home Department | John Baird | 29 April 1919 | Conservative | Succeeded as 2nd Baronet 21 June 1920 |
| First Lord of the Admiralty | **Sir Edward Carson** | 10 December 1916 | Conservative | |
| First Lord of the Admiralty | **Sir Eric Geddes** | 17 July 1917 | Conservative | |
| First Lord of the Admiralty | **Walter Long** | 10 January 1919 | Conservative | |
| First Lord of the Admiralty | **Arthur Lee, 1st Baron Lee of Fareham** | 13 February 1921 | Conservative | |
| Parliamentary and Financial Secretary to the Admiralty | Thomas James Macnamara | 10 December 1916 | Liberal | |
| Parliamentary and Financial Secretary to the Admiralty | Sir James Craig | 2 April 1920 | Conservative | |
| Parliamentary and Financial Secretary to the Admiralty | Leo Amery | 1 April 1921 | Conservative | |
| Additional Parliamentary Secretary to the Admiralty | Victor Bulwer-Lytton, 2nd Earl of Lytton | 7 February 1917 | Conservative | Post abolished 27 January 1919 |
| Civil Lord of the Admiralty | E. G. Pretyman | 14 December 1916 | Conservative | |
| Civil Lord of the Admiralty | Victor Bulwer-Lytton, 2nd Earl of Lytton | 27 January 1919 | Conservative | |
| Civil Lord of the Admiralty | Richard Onslow, 5th Earl of Onslow | 26 October 1920 | Conservative | |
| Civil Lord of the Admiralty | Bolton Eyres-Monsell | 1 April 1921 | Conservative | |
| Second Civil Lord of the Admiralty | Arthur Pease | 10 December 1916 | Conservative | Post abolished 10 January 1919 |
| President of the Board of Agriculture and Fisheries | **Rowland Prothero** | 10 December 1916 | Conservative | Board replaced with Ministry 15 August 1919 |
| Parliamentary Secretaries to the Board of Agriculture and Fisheries | Sir Richard Winfrey | 14 December 1916 – 10 January 1919 | Liberal | |
| Parliamentary Secretaries to the Board of Agriculture and Fisheries | Charles Spencer-Churchill, 9th Duke of Marlborough | 18 February 1917 – 21 March 1918 | Conservative | |
| Parliamentary Secretaries to the Board of Agriculture and Fisheries | George Goschen, 2nd Viscount Goschen | 26 March 1918 – 18 June 1918 | Conservative | |
| Parliamentary Secretaries to the Board of Agriculture and Fisheries | Charles Hepburn-Stuart-Forbes-Trefusis, 21st Baron Clinton | 18 June 1918 – 10 January 1919 | Conservative | |
| Parliamentary Secretaries to the Board of Agriculture and Fisheries | Sir Arthur Griffith-Boscawen | 10 January 1919 | Conservative | Board replaced with Ministry 15 August 1919 |
| Minister of Agriculture and Fisheries | **Arthur Lee, 1st Baron Lee of Fareham** | 15 August 1919 | Conservative | |
| Minister of Agriculture and Fisheries | **Sir Arthur Griffith-Boscawen** | 13 February 1921 | Conservative | |
| Parliamentary Secretary to the Ministry of Agriculture and Fisheries | Sir Arthur Griffith-Boscawen | 15 August 1919 | Conservative | Also Deputy Minister of Fisheries from 18 November 1919 |
| Parliamentary Secretary to the Ministry of Agriculture and Fisheries | vacant | 13 February 1921 | | |
| Parliamentary Secretary to the Ministry of Agriculture and Fisheries | Richard Onslow, 5th Earl of Onslow | 5 April 1921 | Conservative | |
| Parliamentary Secretary to the Ministry of Agriculture and Fisheries | Gilbert Heathcote-Drummond-Willoughby, 2nd Earl of Ancaster | 7 April 1921 | Conservative | Also Deputy Minister of Fisheries from 28 October 1921 |
| President of the Air Board | Weetman Pearson, 1st Viscount Cowdray | 3 January 1917 | Liberal | Air Board replaced with Air Council 26 November 1917 |
| Parliamentary Secretary to the Air Board | John Baird | 14 December 1916 | Conservative | Air Board replaced with Air Council 26 November 1917 |
| President of the Air Council | Harold Harmsworth, 1st Baron Rothermere | 26 November 1917 | Liberal | |
| President of the Air Council | William Weir, 1st Baron Weir | 26 April 1918 | Liberal | Post abolished 10 January 1919 |
| Parliamentary Secretary to the Air Council | John Baird | 26 November 1917 | Conservative | Post abolished 10 January 1919 |
| Secretary of State for Air | **Winston Churchill** | 10 January 1919 | Liberal | |
| Secretary of State for Air | Frederick Guest | 1 April 1921 | Liberal | |
| Under-Secretary of State for Air | J. E. B. Seely | 10 January 1919 | Liberal | |
| Under-Secretary of State for Air | George Tryon | 22 December 1919 | Conservative | |
| Under-Secretary of State for Air | Charles Vane-Tempest-Stewart, 7th Marquess of Londonderry | 2 April 1920 | Conservative | |
| Under-Secretary of State for Air | Ronald Barnes, 3rd Baron Gorell | 18 July 1921 | Liberal | |
| Minister of Blockade | Lord Robert Cecil | 10 December 1916 | Conservative | |
| Minister of Blockade | Sir Laming Worthington-Evans, 1st Baronet | 18 July 1918 | Conservative | Office abolished 10 July 1919 |
| Parliamentary Secretary to the Ministry of Blockade | Frederick Leverton Harris | 22 December 1916 | Conservative | Office abolished 10 January 1919 |
| Secretary of State for the Colonies | **Walter Long** | 10 December 1916 | Conservative | |
| Secretary of State for the Colonies | **Alfred Milner, 1st Viscount Milner** | 10 January 1919 | Conservative | |
| Secretary of State for the Colonies | **Winston Churchill** | 13 February 1921 | Liberal | |
| Under-Secretary of State for the Colonies | Arthur Steel-Maitland | 10 December 1916 | Conservative | Created a Baronet 13 July 1917 |
| Under-Secretary of State for the Colonies | William Hewins | 26 September 1917 | Conservative | |
| Under-Secretary of State for the Colonies | Leo Amery | 10 January 1919 | Conservative | |
| Under-Secretary of State for the Colonies | E. F. L. Wood | 1 April 1921 | Conservative | |
| President of the Board of Education | **Herbert Fisher** | 10 December 1916 | Liberal | |
| Parliamentary Secretary to the Board of Education | Herbert Lewis | 10 December 1916 | Liberal | Knighted in 1922 |
| Minister of Food Control | Hudson Kearley, 1st Baron Devonport | 10 December 1916 | Liberal | |
| Minister of Food Control | David Alfred Thomas, 1st Baron Rhondda | 19 June 1917 | Liberal | Created Viscount Rhondda 19 June 1918 |
| Minister of Food Control | J. R. Clynes | 9 July 1918 | Labour | |
| Minister of Food Control | George Roberts | 10 January 1919 | Labour | |
| Minister of Food Control | Charles McCurdy | 19 March 1920 | Liberal | Office abolished 31 March 1921 |
| Parliamentary Secretary to the Ministry of Food Control | Charles Bathurst | 12 December 1916 | Conservative | Knighted in 1917 |
| Parliamentary Secretary to the Ministry of Food Control | J. R. Clynes | 2 July 1917 | Labour | |
| Parliamentary Secretary to the Ministry of Food Control | Waldorf Astor | 18 July 1918 | Conservative | |
| Parliamentary Secretary to the Ministry of Food Control | Charles McCurdy | 27 January 1919 | Liberal | |
| Parliamentary Secretary to the Ministry of Food Control | Sir William Mitchell-Thomson | 19 April 1920 | Conservative | Office abolished 31 March 1921 |
| President of the Local Government Board | **David Alfred Thomas, 1st Baron Rhondda** | 10 December 1916 | Liberal | |
| President of the Local Government Board | **William Fisher** | 28 June 1917 | Conservative | |
| President of the Local Government Board | **Sir Auckland Geddes** | 4 November 1918 | Conservative | |
| President of the Local Government Board | **Christopher Addison** | 10 January 1919 | Liberal | Board became Ministry of Health 24 June 1919 |
| Parliamentary Secretary to the Local Government Board | William Hayes Fisher | 10 December 1916 | Conservative | |
| Parliamentary Secretary to the Local Government Board | Stephen Walsh | 28 June 1917 | Labour | |
| Parliamentary Secretary to the Local Government Board | Waldorf Astor | 27 January 1919 | Conservative | Board became Ministry of Health 24 June 1919 |
| Minister of Health | **Christopher Addison** | 24 June 1919 | Liberal | |
| Minister of Health | **Sir Alfred Mond** | 1 April 1921 | Liberal | |
| Parliamentary Secretary to the Ministry of Health | Waldorf Astor | 24 June 1919 | Conservative | Succeeded as 2nd Viscount Astor 18 October 1919 |
| Parliamentary Secretary to the Ministry of Health | Richard Onslow, 5th Earl of Onslow | 7 April 1921 | Conservative | |
| Secretary of State for India | **Austen Chamberlain** | 10 December 1916 | Conservative | |
| Secretary of State for India | **Edwin Montagu** | 17 July 1917 | Liberal | |
| Secretary of State for India | **William Peel, 2nd Viscount Peel** | 19 March 1922 | Conservative | |
| Under-Secretary of State for India | John Dickson, 1st Baron Islington | 10 December 1916 | Liberal | |
| Under-Secretary of State for India | Satyendra Prasanno Sinha, 1st Baron Sinha | 10 January 1919 | Liberal | |
| Under-Secretary of State for India | Victor Bulwer-Lytton, 2nd Earl of Lytton | 22 September 1920 | Conservative | |
| Under-Secretary of State for India | Edward Turnour, 6th Earl Winterton | 20 March 1922 | Conservative | |
| Lord Lieutenant of Ireland | John French, 1st Viscount French of Ypres | 6 May 1918 – 2 May 1921 | | Entered the Cabinet 28 October 1918; left the Cabinet 2 April 1921 |
| Chief Secretary for Ireland | **Henry Duke** | 10 December 1916 | Conservative | Knighted in 1918 |
| Chief Secretary for Ireland | **Edward Shortt** | 5 May 1918 | Liberal | |
| Chief Secretary for Ireland | **Ian Macpherson** | 10 January 1919 | Liberal | |
| Chief Secretary for Ireland | **Sir Hamar Greenwood** | 2 April 1920 | Liberal | |
| Vice-President of the Department of Agriculture for Ireland | Thomas Wallace Russell | 10 December 1916 | Liberal | Created a Baronet 20 June 1917 |
| Vice-President of the Department of Agriculture for Ireland | Hugh T. Barrie | 15 January 1919 | Conservative | |
| Minister of Labour | **John Hodge** | 10 December 1916 | Labour | |
| Minister of Labour | **George Roberts** | 17 August 1917 | Labour | |
| Minister of Labour | **Sir Robert Horne** | 10 January 1919 | Conservative | |
| Minister of Labour | **Thomas James Macnamara** | 19 March 1920 | Liberal | |
| Parliamentary Secretary to the Ministry of Labour | William Bridgeman | 22 December 1916 | Conservative | |
| Parliamentary Secretary to the Ministry of Labour | George James Wardle | 10 January 1919 | Labour | |
| Parliamentary Secretary to the Ministry of Labour | Sir Anderson Montague-Barlow | 2 April 1920 | Conservative | |
| Chancellor of the Duchy of Lancaster | **Sir Frederick Cawley** | 10 December 1916 | Liberal | |
| Chancellor of the Duchy of Lancaster | **Max Aitken, 1st Baron Beaverbrook** | 10 February 1918 | Conservative | |
| Chancellor of the Duchy of Lancaster | **William Hayes Fisher** | 4 November 1918 | Conservative | Created Baron Downham 16 November 1918 |
| Chancellor of the Duchy of Lancaster | David Lindsay, 27th Earl of Crawford | 10 January 1919 | Conservative | |
| Chancellor of the Duchy of Lancaster | William Peel, 2nd Viscount Peel | 1 April 1921 | Conservative | |
| Chancellor of the Duchy of Lancaster | Sir William Sutherland | 7 April 1922 | Liberal | |
| Minister of Information | **Max Aitken, 1st Baron Beaverbrook** | 10 February 1918 | Conservative | |
| Minister of Information | **William Hayes Fisher** | 4 November 1918 | Conservative | Created Baron Downham 16 November 1918; office abolished 10 January 1919 |
| Minister of Munitions | **Christopher Addison** | 10 December 1916 | Liberal | |
| Minister of Munitions | **Winston Churchill** | 17 July 1917 | Liberal | |
| Minister of Munitions | Andrew Weir, 1st Baron Inverforth | 10 January 1919 | Conservative | Office abolished 21 March 1921 |
| Parliamentary Secretaries to the Ministry of Munitions | Sir Laming Worthington-Evans, 1st Baronet | 14 December 1916 – 30 January 1918 | Conservative | |
| Parliamentary Secretaries to the Ministry of Munitions | Frederick Kellaway | 14 December 1916 – 1 April 1920 | Liberal | |
| Parliamentary Secretaries to the Ministry of Munitions | J. E. B. Seely | 10 July 1918 – 10 January 1919 | Liberal | |
| Parliamentary Secretaries to the Ministry of Munitions | John Baird | 10 January 1919 – 29 April 1919 | Liberal | |
| Parliamentary and Financial Secretary to the Ministry of Munitions | Sir Laming Worthington-Evans, 1st Baronet | 30 January 1918 – 18 July 1918 | Conservative | |
| Parliamentary and Financial Secretary to the Ministry of Munitions | James Hope | 27 January 1919 – 31 March 1921 | Conservative | |
| Director of National Service | Neville Chamberlain | 15 December 1916 | Conservative | |
| Director of National Service | Sir Auckland Geddes | 17 August 1917 | Conservative | Post abolished 19 December 1919 |
| Parliamentary Secretaries to the Ministry of National Service | Stephen Walsh | 17 March 1917 – 28 June 1917 | Labour | |
| Parliamentary Secretaries to the Ministry of National Service | Cecil Beck | 28 June 1917 – 19 December 1919 | Liberal | |
| Parliamentary Secretaries to the Ministry of National Service | William Peel, 2nd Viscount Peel | 15 April 1918 – 10 January 1919 | Conservative | |
| Paymaster General | Sir Joseph Compton-Rickett | 15 December 1916 | Liberal | |
| Paymaster General | Sir Tudor Walters | 26 October 1919 | Liberal | |
| Minister of Pensions | George Nicoll Barnes | 10 December 1916 | Labour | In the War Cabinet 29 May 1917 – 3 August 1917 |
| Minister of Pensions | John Hodge | 17 August 1917 | Labour | |
| Minister of Pensions | Sir Laming Worthington-Evans, 1st Baronet | 10 January 1919 | Conservative | |
| Minister of Pensions | Ian Macpherson | 2 April 1920 | Liberal | |
| Parliamentary Secretary to the Ministry of Pensions | Sir Arthur Griffith-Boscawen | 22 December 1916 | Conservative | |
| Parliamentary Secretary to the Ministry of Pensions | Sir James Craig | 10 January 1919 | Conservative | |
| Parliamentary Secretary to the Ministry of Pensions | George Tryon | 2 April 1920 | Conservative | |
| Postmaster General | Albert Illingworth | 10 December 1916 | Liberal | |
| Postmaster General | Frederick Kellaway | 1 April 1921 | Liberal | |
| Assistant Postmaster General | Herbert Pease | 10 December 1916 | Conservative | |
| Minister without Portfolio | **Arthur Henderson** | 10 December 1916 – 12 August 1917 | Labour | In the War Cabinet 10 December 1916 – 12 August 1917 |
| Minister without Portfolio | **Alfred Milner, 1st Viscount Milner** | 10 December 1916 – 18 April 1918 | Conservative | In the War Cabinet 10 December 1916 – 18 April 1918 |
| Minister without Portfolio | **Jan Smuts** | 22 June 1917 – 10 January 1919 | | In the War Cabinet 22 June 1917 – 10 January 1919 |
| Minister without Portfolio | **Sir Edward Carson** | 17 July 1917 – 21 January 1918 | Conservative | |
| Minister without Portfolio | **George Nicoll Barnes** | 13 August 1917 – 27 January 1920 | Labour | In the War Cabinet 13 August 1917 – 10 January 1919 |
| Minister without Portfolio | **Austen Chamberlain** | 18 April 1918 – 10 January 1919 | Conservative | Entered the War Cabinet 18 April 1918 |
| Minister without Portfolio | **Sir Eric Geddes** | 10 January 1919 – 19 May 1919 | Conservative | In the War Cabinet 10 January 1919 – 31 October 1919 |
| Minister without Portfolio | **Sir Laming Worthington-Evans, 1st Baronet** | 10 January 1919 – 13 February 1921 | Conservative | |
| Minister without Portfolio | **Christopher Addison** | 1 April 1921 – 14 July 1921 | Liberal | |
| Minister of Reconstruction | Christopher Addison | 17 July 1917 | Liberal | |
| Minister of Reconstruction | Sir Auckland Geddes | 10 January 1919 | Conservative | Office abolished 19 December 1919 |
| Secretary for Scotland | **Robert Munro** | 10 December 1916 | Liberal | |
| Parliamentary Secretary to the Ministry of Health for Scotland | John Pratt | 8 August 1919 | Liberal | Knighted 1922 |
| Minister of Shipping | Sir Joseph Maclay | 10 December 1916 | Liberal | Office abolished 31 March 1921 |
| Parliamentary Secretary to the Ministry of Shipping | Sir Leo Chiozza Money | 22 December 1916 | Liberal | |
| Parliamentary Secretary to the Ministry of Shipping | Leslie Orme Wilson | 10 January 1919 | Conservative | |
| Minister of Supply | Andrew Weir, 1st Baron Inverforth | 10 January 1919 | Conservative | Office abolished 31 March 1921 |
| President of the Board of Trade | **Sir Albert Stanley** | 10 December 1916 | Conservative | |
| President of the Board of Trade | **Sir Auckland Geddes** | 26 May 1919 | Conservative | |
| President of the Board of Trade | **Sir Robert Horne** | 19 March 1920 | Conservative | |
| President of the Board of Trade | **Stanley Baldwin** | 1 April 1921 | Conservative | |
| Parliamentary Secretary to the Board of Trade | George Roberts | 14 December 1916 | Labour | |
| Parliamentary Secretary to the Board of Trade | George Wardle | 17 August 1917 | Labour | |
| Parliamentary Secretary to the Board of Trade | William Bridgeman | 10 January 1919 | Conservative | |
| Parliamentary Secretary to the Board of Trade | Sir Philip Lloyd-Greame | 22 August 1920 | Conservative | |
| Parliamentary Secretary to the Board of Trade | Sir William Mitchell-Thomson | 1 April 1921 | Conservative | |
| Secretary for Overseas Trade | Sir Arthur Steel-Maitland | 14 September 1917 | Conservative | |
| Secretary for Overseas Trade | Sir Hamar Greenwood | 29 April 1919 | Liberal | |
| Secretary for Overseas Trade | Frederick Kellaway | 2 April 1920 | Liberal | |
| Secretary for Overseas Trade | Sir Philip Lloyd-Greame | 1 April 1921 | Conservative | |
| Parliamentary Secretary for Mines | William Bridgeman | 22 August 1920 | Conservative | |
| Minister of Transport | **Sir Eric Geddes** | 19 May 1919 | Conservative | |
| Minister of Transport | William Peel, 2nd Viscount Peel | 7 November 1921 | Conservative | |
| Minister of Transport | David Lindsay, 27th Earl of Crawford | 12 April 1922 | Conservative | |
| Parliamentary Secretary to the Ministry of Transport | Sir Rhys Rhys-Williams, 1st Baronet | 23 September 1919 | Liberal | |
| Parliamentary Secretary to the Ministry of Transport | Arthur Neal | 28 November 1919 | Liberal | |
| Secretary of State for War | **Edward Stanley, 17th Earl of Derby** | 10 December 1916 | Conservative | |
| Secretary of State for War | **Alfred Milner, 1st Viscount Milner** | 18 April 1918 | Conservative | |
| Secretary of State for War | **Winston Churchill** | 10 January 1919 | Liberal | |
| Secretary of State for War | **Sir Laming Worthington-Evans, 1st Baronet** | 13 February 1921 | Conservative | |
| Under-Secretary of State for War | Ian Macpherson | 14 December 1916 | Liberal | |
| Under-Secretary of State for War | William Peel, 2nd Viscount Peel | 10 January 1919 | Conservative | |
| Under-Secretary of State for War | Sir Robert Sanders | 1 April 1921 | Conservative | |
| Financial Secretary to the War Office | Henry Forster | 10 December 1916 | Conservative | Created Baron Forster 12 December 1919 |
| Financial Secretary to the War Office | Sir Archibald Williamson | 18 December 1919 | Liberal | |
| Financial Secretary to the War Office | George Frederick Stanley | 1 April 1921 | Conservative | |
| Parliamentary Secretary to the War Office | James Stanhope, 7th Earl Stanhope | 14 December 1916 | Conservative | Post abolished 10 January 1919 |
| First Commissioner of Works | Sir Alfred Mond | 10 December 1916 | Liberal | |
| First Commissioner of Works | David Lindsay, 27th Earl of Crawford | 1 April 1921 | Conservative | Entered the Cabinet 7 April 1922 |
| Attorney General | Sir F. E. Smith | 10 December 1916 | Conservative | |
| Attorney General | Sir Gordon Hewart | 10 January 1919 | Liberal | Entered the Cabinet 7 November 1921 |
| Attorney General | Sir Ernest Pollock | 6 March 1922 | Conservative | |
| Solicitor General | Sir Gordon Hewart | 10 December 1916 | Liberal | |
| Solicitor General | Sir Ernest Pollock | 10 January 1919 | Conservative | |
| Solicitor General | Leslie Scott | 6 March 1922 | Conservative | Knighted in 1922 |
| Lord Advocate | James Clyde | 10 December 1916 | Conservative | |
| Lord Advocate | Thomas Morison | 25 March 1920 | Liberal | |
| Lord Advocate | Charles David Murray | 5 March 1922 | Conservative | |
| Solicitor General for Scotland | Thomas Morison | 10 December 1916 | Liberal | |
| Solicitor General for Scotland | Charles David Murray | 25 March 1920 | Conservative | |
| Solicitor General for Scotland | Andrew Briggs Constable | 16 March 1922 | Conservative | |
| Solicitor General for Scotland | William Watson | 24 July 1922 | Conservative | |
| Lord Chancellor of Ireland | Sir John O'Brien | 10 December 1916 | Liberal | |
| Lord Chancellor of Ireland | Sir James Campbell | 4 June 1918 | Conservative | |
| Lord Chancellor of Ireland | Sir John Ross | 27 June 1921 | Conservative | |
| Attorney General for Ireland | James O'Connor | 8 January 1917 | | |
| Attorney General for Ireland | Arthur Samuels | 7 April 1918 | Conservative | |
| Attorney General for Ireland | Denis Henry | 6 July 1919 | Conservative | |
| Attorney General for Ireland | Thomas Brown | 5 August 1921 | Conservative | |
| Attorney General for Ireland | vacant | 16 August 1921 | | |
| Solicitor General for Ireland | James Chambers | 19 March 1917 | Conservative | |
| Solicitor General for Ireland | Arthur Samuels | 12 September 1917 | Conservative | |
| Solicitor General for Ireland | John Powell | 7 April 1918 | Conservative | |
| Solicitor General for Ireland | Denis Henry | 27 November 1918 | Conservative | |
| Solicitor General for Ireland | Daniel Wilson | 6 July 1919 | Conservative | |
| Solicitor General for Ireland | Thomas Brown | 12 June 1921 | Conservative | |
| Solicitor General for Ireland | vacant | 5 August 1921 | | |
| Lord Steward of the Household | Horace Farquihar, 1st Baron Farquhar | 14 December 1916 | Conservative | Created Viscount Farquhar 21 June 1917 |
| Lord Chamberlain of the Household | William Mansfield, 2nd Baron Sandhurst | 14 December 1916 | Liberal | Created Viscount Sandhurst 1 January 1917 |
| Lord Chamberlain of the Household | John Stewart-Murray, 8th Duke of Atholl | 20 November 1921 | Conservative | |
| Vice-Chamberlain of the Household | Cecil Beck | 14 December 1916 | Liberal | |
| Vice-Chamberlain of the Household | William Dudley Ward | 9 December 1917 | Liberal | |
| Master of the Horse | Edwyn Scudamore-Stanhope, 10th Earl of Chesterfield | 14 December 1916 | Liberal | |
| Treasurer of the Household | James Craig | 14 December 1916 | Conservative | Created a Baronet 5 February 1918 |
| Treasurer of the Household | vacant | 22 January 1918 | | |
| Treasurer of the Household | Robert Sanders | 11 June 1918 | Conservative | |
| Treasurer of the Household | Bolton Eyres-Monsell | 5 February 1919 | Conservative | |
| Treasurer of the Household | George Gibbs | 1 April 1921 | Conservative | |
| Comptroller of the Household | Sir Edwin Cornwall | 14 December 1916 | Liberal | |
| Comptroller of the Household | George Frederick Stanley | 28 February 1919 | Conservative | |
| Comptroller of the Household | Harry Barnston | 7 April 1921 | Conservative | |
| Captain of the Gentlemen-at-Arms | Edward Colebrooke, 1st Baron Colebrooke | 14 December 1916 | Liberal | Also Joint Government Chief Whip in the House of Lords |
| Captain of the Yeomen of the Guard | Charles Harbord, 6th Baron Suffield | 14 December 1916 | Conservative | |
| Captain of the Yeomen of the Guard | Hylton Jolliffe, 3rd Baron Hylton | 21 May 1918 | Conservative | Also Joint Government Chief Whip in the House of Lords |
| Lords in Waiting | Richard Herschell, 2nd Baron Herschell | 14 December 1916 – 11 February 1919 | Liberal | |
| Lords in Waiting | George Hamilton-Gordon, 2nd Baron Stanmore | 14 December 1916 – 19 October 1922 | Liberal | |
| Lords in Waiting | John Brocklehurst, 1st Baron Ranksborough | 14 December 1916 – 4 April 1921 | Liberal | |
| Lords in Waiting | Arthur Annesley, 11th Viscount Valentia | 14 December 1916 – 19 October 1922 | Conservative | |
| Lords in Waiting | Hylton Jolliffe, 3rd Baron Hylton | 14 December 1916 – 18 May 1918 | Conservative | Also Joint Government Chief Whip in the House of Lords |
| Lords in Waiting | Savile Crossley, 1st Baron Somerleyton | 18 May 1918 – 19 October 1922 | Conservative | |
| Lords in Waiting | George Henry Robert Child Child-Villiers, 8th Earl of Jersey | 11 January 1919 – 17 August 1919 | Conservative | |
| Lords in Waiting | Orlando Bridgeman, 5th Earl of Bradford | 11 February 1919 – 19 October 1922 | Conservative | |
| Lords in Waiting | Richard Onslow, 5th Earl of Onslow | 17 August 1919 – 21 November 1920 | Conservative | |
| Lords in Waiting | George Bingham, 5th Earl of Lucan | 12 November 1920 – 19 October 1922 | Conservative | |
| Lords in Waiting | George Villiers, 6th Earl of Clarendon | 4 April 1921 – 19 October 1922 | Conservative | |

== See also ==
- History of the United Kingdom during the First World War § Lloyd George as Prime Minister

| Preceded by Asquith coalition ministry | Government of the United Kingdom; 1916–1922 | Succeeded by Law ministry |
