= February 1917 Dublin University by-election =

UK parliamentary by-election

The February 1917 Dublin University by-election was held on 5 February 1917. The by-election was held due to the incumbent Irish Unionist MP, James Campbell, becoming Lord Chief Justice of Ireland. It was won by the Irish Unionist candidate Arthur Samuels.

Dublin University by-election, February 1917
Party	Candidate	Votes	%	±%
Irish Unionist	Arthur Samuels	1,841	73.06	N/A
Irish Unionist	Robert Woods	679	26.94	N/A
Majority		1,162	46.12	N/A
Turnout		2,520	49.20	N/A
Irish Unionist hold		Swing	N/A	
