= 1919 Dublin University by-election =

UK Parliamentary by-election

- 28 July 1919
	UUU
Candidate	Arthur Samuels
Party	Irish Unionist
Alliance	Coalition
Popular vote	Unopposed
MP before election
Arthur Samuels
Irish Unionist
Subsequent MP
William Jellett
Irish Unionist

The 1919 Dublin University by-election was held on 28 July 1919. The by-election was held due to the appointment to the High Court of Justice in Ireland of the incumbent Irish Unionist MP, Arthur Samuels. It was uncontested and the Irish Unionist candidate William Jellett was elected.

== Result ==
1919 by-election: Dublin University (1 seat)
Party	Candidate	Votes	%	±%
Irish Unionist	William Jellett	Unopposed		
Irish Unionist hold				

== Aftermath ==
This was the last election to the UK Parliament to be held in the 26 counties that would become the Irish Free State in 1922.
