= William Jellett =

Irish politician and barrister (1857–1936)

Member of Parliament for Dublin University
- In office 28 July 1919 – 6 December 1922
- Preceded by: Arthur Samuels; Robert Woods
- Succeeded by: Constituency abolished

Personal details
- Born: 19 May 1857 Dublin, Ireland
- Died: 27 October 1936 (aged 79) Dublin, Ireland
- Party: Irish Unionist
- Other political affiliations: Unionist Anti-Partition League
- Spouse: Janet McKenzie Stokes
- Children: 4, including Mainie
- Parent: John Hewitt Jellett (father)
- Relatives: Eva Jellett (sister)
- Education: Trinity College Dublin

William Morgan Jellett (19 May 1857 – 27 October 1936) was an Irish Unionist Member of Parliament (MP) in the Parliament of the United Kingdom. The Irish Unionists were the Irish wing of the Conservative Party.

== Biography ==
He was born in Dublin, the son of Rev. John Hewitt Jellett, Provost of Trinity College, Dublin and his wife and cousin Dorothea Charlotte Morris. His sister Eva Jellett was a pioneering female doctor.

He attended Trinity College Dublin, before being called to the Irish Bar in 1882. He became a Queen's Counsel (QC) in 1899. He was private secretary to Lord Ashbourne, the Lord Chancellor of Ireland from 1885 to 1886, 1886 to 1892, and 1895 to 1905.

Jellett contested the 1918 general election for Dublin University. On 28 July 1919, he was elected in a by-election, being the last United Kingdom MP elected in the twenty-six counties which became the Irish Free State in December 1922. Jellett ceased to be an MP on 26 October 1922 on the dissolution of parliament, and his constituency ceased to be represented in the United Kingdom Parliament.

He married Janet McKenzie Stokes, a talented musician, and they had four daughters, including the celebrated artist Mainie Jellett, and Dorothea (Bay) Jellett, who for many years conducted the orchestra at the Gaiety Theatre, Dublin.

Parliament of the United Kingdom
Preceded by Arthur Samuels; Robert Woods	Member of Parliament for Dublin University; 1919–1922; With: Robert Woods	Constituency abolished

Dáil	Election	Deputy (Party)	Deputy (Party)	Deputy (Party)	Deputy (Party)
1st	1918	Arthur Samuels (U)	Robert Woods (Ind U)	2 seats under 1918 Act	
1st	1919 by-election	William Jellett (U)	Robert Woods (Ind U)	2 seats under 1918 Act	
2nd	1921	Ernest Alton (Ind U)	James Craig (Ind U)	William Thrift (Ind U)	Gerald Fitzgibbon (Ind U)
3rd	1922	Ernest Alton (Ind.)	James Craig (Ind.)	William Thrift (Ind.)	Gerald Fitzgibbon (Ind.)
4th	1923	Ernest Alton (Ind.)	James Craig (Ind.)	William Thrift (Ind.)	3 seats from 1923
5th	1927 (Jun)	Ernest Alton (Ind.)	James Craig (Ind.)	William Thrift (Ind.)	3 seats from 1923
6th	1927 (Sep)	Ernest Alton (Ind.)	James Craig (Ind.)	William Thrift (Ind.)	3 seats from 1923
7th	1932	Ernest Alton (Ind.)	James Craig (Ind.)	William Thrift (Ind.)	3 seats from 1923
8th	1933	Ernest Alton (Ind.)	James Craig (Ind.)	William Thrift (Ind.)	3 seats from 1923
8th	1933 by-election	Ernest Alton (Ind.)	Robert Rowlette (Ind.)	William Thrift (Ind.)	3 seats from 1923
