= John Hewitt Jellett =

Irish Anglican priest, mathematician, writer (1817–1888)

31st Provost of Trinity College Dublin
- In office 1 August 1881 – 19 February 1888
- Preceded by: Humphrey Lloyd
- Succeeded by: George Salmon

Personal details
- Born: 25 December 1817; Cashel, County Tipperary, Ireland
- Died: 19 February 1888 (aged 70); Dublin, Ireland
- Resting place: Mount Jerome Cemetery, Dublin, Ireland
- Spouse(s): Dorothea Charlotte Morris (m. 1855)
- Children: 7
- Education: Kilkenny College
- Alma mater: Trinity College Dublin (B.A., 1837; M.A., 1843; B.D., 1866; D.D., 1881)
- Awards: Royal Medal (1881)

John Hewitt Jellett (25 December 1817 – 19 February 1888) was an Irish mathematician, priest, and academic who served as the 31st Provost of Trinity College Dublin from 1881 to 1888. He was also a member of the clergy in the Church of Ireland.

== Early and personal life ==
He was the son of Rev. Morgan Jellett (c. 1787–1832), later rector of Tullycorbet, County Monaghan, and his wife Harriette Townsend, daughter of Hewitt Baldwin Poole, Esq. (died 1800), of Mayfield, Cork, by his wife Dorothea Morris. He was born at Cashel, County Tipperary in 1817. He was educated at Kilkenny College and at Trinity College Dublin, where he became a fellow in 1840. He was the eldest brother of Hewitt Poole Jellett, Serjeant-at-law (Ireland) and Chairman of the Quarter Sessions for County Laois, and of the Venerable Henry Jellett, Archdeacon of Cloyne.

John Hewitt Jellett married his cousin on his mother's side, Dorothea Charlotte Morris Morgan (c. 1824–1911), daughter of James Morgan, on 7 July 1855 and had seven children. His son, William Jellett, was a member of the Parliament of the United Kingdom: he was the father of the celebrated artist Mainie Jellett, and of Dorothea Jellett, director of the orchestra of the Gaiety Theatre, Dublin. Another son, Henry Holmes Jellett, was a civil engineer in British India. His daughter Harriette Mary Jellett was wife of the noted Irish physicist George Francis FitzGerald. Another daughter, Eva Jellett, was the first woman to graduate with a degree in medicine from Trinity College Dublin, and went on to practice as a doctor in India.

He died of blood poisoning at the Provost's House, on 19 February 1888, and was buried in Mount Jerome Cemetery, Dublin, on 23 February. The funeral procession was the largest that ever left Trinity College.

== Academic career ==
He graduated B.A. in mathematics in 1837, M.A. 1843, B.D. 1866, and D.D. 1881. He had been ordained a priest in 1846. In 1848, he was elected to the chair of natural philosophy at Trinity College, and in 1868, he received the appointment of commissioner of Irish national education.

In 1847, he was appointed the first Professor of Natural Philosophy at Trinity College Dublin. He published several scientific papers in the Proceedings of the Royal Irish Academy (RIA), serving as the Academy's president from 1869 to 1874. He was awarded the RIA's Cunningham Medal in 1850 and became a Commissioner of National Education in 1868. In 1881, he received the Royal Society's gold medal. His research focused on polarised light, and in the course of his studies, particularly in what he termed "chemical optics", he developed a saccharometer, an instrument that utilized the optical properties of polarised light to analyse chemical substances, especially sugars.

In 1851, he was awarded the Cunningham Medal of the Royal Irish Academy for his work on the "Calculus of Variations". The society later elected him their president, a position he held from 1869 to 1874.

In 1870, on the death of Dr. Thomas Luby, he became a Senior Fellow and thus a member of the College Board. Gladstone's government in February 1881 appointed Jellett provost of Trinity College. In the same year, he was awarded a Royal Medal by the Royal Society.

After the disestablishment of the Church of Ireland, he took an active part in the deliberations of the general synod and in every work calculated to advance its interests. He was an able mathematician, and wrote A Treatise of the Calculus of Variations (1850), and A Treatise on the Theory of Friction (1872), as well as several papers on pure and applied mathematics, articles in the Transactions of the Royal Irish Academy. He also wrote some theological essays, sermons, and religious treatises, of which the principal were An Examination of some of the Moral Difficulties of the Old Testament (1867), and The Efficacy of Prayer (1878).

Academic offices
Preceded by Humphrey Lloyd	Provost of Trinity College Dublin; 1881–1888	Succeeded by George Salmon
