= Eva Jellett =

Irish doctor

- Born: Eva Josephine Jellett; 6 January 1868; Dublin, Ireland
- Died: 1 December 1958 (aged 90); St Austell, Cornwall, United Kingdom
- Occupation: Physician

Eva Josephine Jellett (8 April 1880 – 2 July 1955) was an Irish doctor. She was the first woman to graduate in medicine from Dublin University.

== Early life and study ==
Jellett was born in Wellington Row to John Hewitt Jellett who was a clergyman, mathematician, and provost of Trinity College Dublin (TCD), and his wife and cousin Dorothea Charlotte Morris (1823–1911) who was from Tivoli, County Cork. Jellett was initially educated by governesses from Germany and later sent to Alexandra college. She was one of the early women students, matriculating in 1897, who attended courses in the Catholic University of Ireland School of Medicine, St Cecilia St., Dublin. She transferred to TCD in 1904 once women were permitted to attend that college. She graduated with her MB in September 1905 making her the university's first women graduate in medicine. Her niece was the artist Mainie Jellett.

== Career ==
After working as a clinical clerk in the Coombe Hospital in Dublin, Jellet moved to India in 1906 to take up a position in the Dublin University Mission in Hazaribagh. Once she arrived in 1908 she was able to run the newly founded women's hospital, St Columba's Hospital for Women. In 1919 she was promoted to head associate giving her control over all the female staff in India. She stepped down as head in 1923 and returned in 1924 having spent almost all her time at that hospital. She spent one year, 1917, in the British military hospital in Bombay.

== Death ==
After she retired, Jellet moved to Switzerland for some years before finally moving, c 1938, to Gorran Haven, St Austell, Cornwall. It was there she died.
