= Robert Woods (surgeon) =

Irish surgeon and politician (1865–1938)

Sir Robert Woods
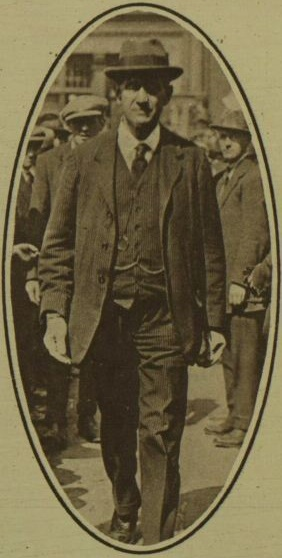
- Woods in 1921

Member of Parliament for Dublin University
- In office 1918–1922
- Preceded by: Arthur Samuels; Edward Carson
- Succeeded by: Constituency abolished

Personal details
- Born: 27 April 1865 County Offaly, Ireland
- Died: 8 September 1938 (aged 73) County Dublin, Ireland
- Party: Independent
- Spouse: Margaret Shaw (m. 1884)
- Children: 5
- Relatives: James Johnston Shaw (father-in-law)
- Education: Trinity College Dublin

Sir Robert Henry Woods (27 April 1865 – 8 September 1938) was an Irish surgeon and otorhinolaryngologist and also an independent Unionist Member of Parliament (MP) in the United Kingdom parliament.

== Personal life ==
He was born at Tullamore, County Offaly, the son of Christopher Woods and Dorothea Lowe. He attended Wesley College, Dublin and Trinity College Dublin as well as studying in Vienna, before graduating in medicine in 1889.

In August 1894, he married Margaret Shaw, daughter of county court judge James Johnston Shaw; they had five children.

He became President of the Royal College of Surgeons in Ireland from 1910 to 1912. He was professor of laryngology and otology at Trinity College. He was knighted in 1913.

== Political career ==
He was MP for Dublin University from 1918 to 1922, having previously been defeated in a 1917 by-election for the same constituency.

When the First Dáil convened in January 1919, he was the only unionist who formally declined the offer to attend the assembly. In July 1921, he took part in the Mansion House conference which was instrumental in bringing about a truce in hostilities between republican and British forces.

Woods left the House of Commons at the dissolution of 1922, when his constituency ceased to be represented in the House of Commons.

== Death ==
Woods died in Killiney, Dublin on 8 September 1938, aged 73.

Parliament of the United Kingdom
Preceded by Arthur Samuels; Edward Carson	Member of Parliament for Dublin University; 1918–1922; With: Arthur Samuels to 1919; William Jellett from 1919	Constituency abolished

Dáil	Election	Deputy (Party)	Deputy (Party)	Deputy (Party)	Deputy (Party)
1st	1918	Arthur Samuels (U)	Robert Woods (Ind U)	2 seats under 1918 Act	
1st	1919 by-election	William Jellett (U)	Robert Woods (Ind U)	2 seats under 1918 Act	
2nd	1921	Ernest Alton (Ind U)	James Craig (Ind U)	William Thrift (Ind U)	Gerald Fitzgibbon (Ind U)
3rd	1922	Ernest Alton (Ind.)	James Craig (Ind.)	William Thrift (Ind.)	Gerald Fitzgibbon (Ind.)
4th	1923	Ernest Alton (Ind.)	James Craig (Ind.)	William Thrift (Ind.)	3 seats from 1923
5th	1927 (Jun)	Ernest Alton (Ind.)	James Craig (Ind.)	William Thrift (Ind.)	3 seats from 1923
6th	1927 (Sep)	Ernest Alton (Ind.)	James Craig (Ind.)	William Thrift (Ind.)	3 seats from 1923
7th	1932	Ernest Alton (Ind.)	James Craig (Ind.)	William Thrift (Ind.)	3 seats from 1923
8th	1933	Ernest Alton (Ind.)	James Craig (Ind.)	William Thrift (Ind.)	3 seats from 1923
8th	1933 by-election	Ernest Alton (Ind.)	Robert Rowlette (Ind.)	William Thrift (Ind.)	3 seats from 1923
