= John Blake Powell =

Irish solicitor, barrister and judge

The Right Honourable John Blake Powell KC

Judge of the High Court of the Irish Free State
- In office 1922 – 13 September 1923

Judge of the High Court of Justice in Ireland
- In office 1918–1922

Personal details
- Born: 1870 Ireland
- Died: 13 September 1923 (aged 52–53)
- Occupation: Solicitor, barrister

John Blake Powell, PC (Ire), KC (1870 – 13 September 1923) was an Irish solicitor, barrister and judge.

He was the eldest son of John Powell of Ballytivan House, Sligo. In 1889, he married Catherine O'Sullivan Morris.

Originally qualifying as a solicitor, he was called to the Bar in 1894. From 1904 to 1914 he was Senior Crown Prosecutor for County Leitrim and from 1914 to 1918 held the same position in County Sligo. He took silk in 1905 and was elected a bencher in 1909. He was a delegate to the Irish Convention in 1917–1918. In 1918 he briefly served as Solicitor-General for Ireland.

In 1918 he was appointed a judge of the Chancery Division of the High Court of Justice in Ireland, remaining in this post in the High Court of the Irish Free State until his death.

He was appointed to the Privy Council of Ireland in the 1920 Birthday Honours, allowing him to use the style "The Right Honourable".

Political offices
Preceded by Arthur Samuels	Solicitor-General for Ireland; April–November 1918	Succeeded by Denis Henry
