= Arthur Samuels =

Irish politician, barrister and judge (1852–1925)

- Portrait by Walter Stoneman, 1918

Member of Parliament for Dublin University
- In office 1917–1919
- Preceded by: James Campbell
- Succeeded by: William Jellett

Attorney-General for Ireland
- In office 1918–1919
- Preceded by: James O'Connor
- Succeeded by: Denis Henry

Solicitor-General for Ireland
- In office 1917–1918
- Preceded by: James Chambers
- Succeeded by: John Blake Powell

Personal details
- Born: 19 May 1852 County Dublin, Ireland
- Died: 11 May 1925 (aged 72) La Croix, France
- Party: Irish Unionist
- Spouse: Emma Irwin (m. 1881)
- Children: 2
- Education: Trinity College Dublin

Arthur Warren Samuels (19 May 1852 – 11 May 1925) was an Irish Unionist Member of Parliament (MP) in the United Kingdom parliament and subsequently a judge. The Irish Unionists were the Irish wing of the Conservative Party.

== Biography ==
He was born in Kingstown, County Dublin, second son of Arthur Samuels, a solicitor, and Katherine Daly, daughter of Owen Daly of Mornington, County Meath. He was educated at the Royal School Dungannon, County Tyrone. He attended Trinity College Dublin, before being called to the Irish Bar in 1877. He became a Queen's Counsel (QC) in 1894 and was called to the English bar in 1896.

Samuels was a member of the Statistical and Social Inquiry Society of Ireland, serving as president between 1906 and 1908. He was particularly interested in Irish Finance, and opposed Home Rule for Ireland on financial grounds.

Samuels was Solicitor-General for Ireland from 1917 to 1918, and Attorney-General for Ireland from 1918 to 1919. He was also made a member of the Privy Council of Ireland in 1918.

He was MP for Dublin University from February 1917 to July 1919, having previously been defeated in a 1903 by-election for the same constituency.

Samuels left the House of Commons when he was appointed to the office of Justice of the King's Bench Division of the High Court of Justice in Ireland in 1919, an office which he held until the court's abolition under the Courts of Justice Act 1924. In common with most of the judges of the old regime, he was not appointed to the High Court established under the 1924 Act. He died a year later on 11 May 1925 in La Croix, France.

Maurice Healy in The Old Munster Circuit praised his personal qualities, his erudition and his valuable book on the financial aspects of Home Rule; but as a Law officer and judge dismissed him as "undistinguished".

== Family ==
He married Emma Margaret Irwin in 1881, daughter of the Reverend James Irwin of Howth. They had two children; barrister and writer Arthur P. I. Samuels (1886–1916), and Dorothy Samuels (1892–1942).

The younger Arthur was an authority on Edmund Burke and edited a collection of his correspondence and writings, which he had almost completed when his work was interrupted by the outbreak of World War I. He became a captain in the Royal Irish Rifles, and was killed on the Western Front in September 1916. His father completed his book on Burke, which was published in 1923. Young Arthur had married Dorothy Young of Milltown, County Antrim, in 1913.

Samuels' daughter, Dorothy Helen Daly, served during World War II as an ambulance driver with the American Ambulance Great Britain. She was killed by a German air raid during the Exeter Blitz on 4 May 1942. She had married Herbert James Daly but was widowed at the time of her death.

== Publications ==
- "The financial relations of Great Britain and Ireland: the expenditure account". Journal of the Statistical and Social Inquiry Society of Ireland. X (LXXVII): 292–320. 1897.
- Some Features in Recent Irish Finance: Presidential Address Read before the Social and Statistical Society of Ireland. Dublin: Sealy, Bryers and Walker. 1906.
- Home Rule Means Bankruptcy! (pamphlet). Dublin: The Unionist Associations of Ireland. 1910.
- Home Rule: Fenian Home Rule: Home Rule All Round: Devolution: What Do They Mean?. Dublin: Hodges, Figgis & Co. 1911.
- Home Rule Finance: An Examination of the Financial Bearings of the Government of Ireland Bill, 1912. Dublin: Hodges, Figgis. 1912.

== Sources ==
- Who's Who of British Members of Parliament, Vol. III 1919–1945, edited by M. Stenton & S. Lees (The Harvester Press 1979)

Parliament of the United Kingdom
Preceded by James Campbell; Edward Carson	Member of Parliament for Dublin University; 1917–1919; With: Edward Carson to 1918; Robert Woods from 1918	Succeeded by William Jellett; Robert Woods
Political offices
Preceded by James Chambers	Solicitor-General for Ireland; 1917–1918	Succeeded by John Blake Powell
Preceded by James O'Connor	Attorney-General for Ireland; 1918–1919	Succeeded by Denis Henry

Dáil	Election	Deputy (Party)	Deputy (Party)	Deputy (Party)	Deputy (Party)
1st	1918	Arthur Samuels (U)	Robert Woods (Ind U)	2 seats under 1918 Act	
1st	1919 by-election	William Jellett (U)	Robert Woods (Ind U)	2 seats under 1918 Act	
2nd	1921	Ernest Alton (Ind U)	James Craig (Ind U)	William Thrift (Ind U)	Gerald Fitzgibbon (Ind U)
3rd	1922	Ernest Alton (Ind.)	James Craig (Ind.)	William Thrift (Ind.)	Gerald Fitzgibbon (Ind.)
4th	1923	Ernest Alton (Ind.)	James Craig (Ind.)	William Thrift (Ind.)	3 seats from 1923
5th	1927 (Jun)	Ernest Alton (Ind.)	James Craig (Ind.)	William Thrift (Ind.)	3 seats from 1923
6th	1927 (Sep)	Ernest Alton (Ind.)	James Craig (Ind.)	William Thrift (Ind.)	3 seats from 1923
7th	1932	Ernest Alton (Ind.)	James Craig (Ind.)	William Thrift (Ind.)	3 seats from 1923
8th	1933	Ernest Alton (Ind.)	James Craig (Ind.)	William Thrift (Ind.)	3 seats from 1923
8th	1933 by-election	Ernest Alton (Ind.)	Robert Rowlette (Ind.)	William Thrift (Ind.)	3 seats from 1923
