= Unionist Anti-Partition League =

Defunct Irish political party

- Leader: William St John Brodrick, Earl of Midleton
- Founded: 1919
- Dissolved: 1922
- Preceded by: Irish Unionist Alliance
- Ideology: Conservatism; Irish unionism United Ireland
- Political position: Right-wing

The Unionist Anti-Partition League (UAPL) was a unionist political organisation in Ireland which campaigned for a united Ireland within the United Kingdom. Led by St John Brodrick, 1st Earl of Midleton, it split from the Irish Unionist Alliance on 24 January 1919 over disagreements regarding the partition of Ireland.

== History ==
The Irish Unionist Alliance (IUA) had been formed in 1891 from the Irish Loyal and Patriotic Union to oppose plans for Home Rule for Ireland. By 1919, the IUA was wracked by internal disagreements between southern and Ulster unionists over the proposed partition of Ireland. Southern unionists saw partition as the defeat of their aim to keep a united Ireland within the United Kingdom. Ulster unionists were more receptive to the notion of partition, seeing it as the only way to safeguard Protestant unionist interests in the north of Ireland. At a Dublin meeting of the party on 24 January 1919, the anti-partition leader of the IUA, Lord Midleton, proposed a motion which would have denied Ulster unionists a say on government proposals affecting the south of Ireland. The motion was defeated, with a majority of both southern and northern unionists rejecting the plan. As a result, Midleton's wing of the party split from the IUA, establishing the Unionist Anti-Partition League that evening.

The split of the IUA had the effect of ending the realistic electoral hopes of unionists in southern Ireland. The UAPL attracted numerous leading figures from the southern unionist community, including Richard Hely-Hutchinson, 6th Earl of Donoughmore, Rupert Guinness, 2nd Earl of Iveagh, John Arnott, Sir Maurice Dockrell and Valentine Browne, 5th Earl of Kenmare. Among the UAPL's more prominent members was William Jellett, KC, who was MP for Dublin University from 28 July 1919 to 1922. However, the majority of ordinary southern unionists remained with the IUA, which was left without effective leadership outside Northern Ireland following the split. The UAPL developed into a think-tank, with a focus on minority rights and constitutional affairs. The group argued against Sinn Féin's policy of absenteeism from the British parliament, believing that it left Irish domestic interests without proper representation. The UAPL was supportive of the work of the Proportional Representation Society of Ireland, seeing proportional representation as a way of ensuring unionist voices were heard in government. In June 1919 the leadership of the League was approached by Sir Horace Plunkett, who invited them to join the new Irish Dominion League. The idea was rejected, as the Dominion League was perceived to be too sympathetic to Irish nationalism. The establishment of the Irish Free State in 1922 and the consequent decrease in the number of southern unionists resulted in the disestablishment of the League.
