= Edward Carson =

Irish politician, barrister and judge (1854–1935)

The Right Honourable The Lord Carson PC PC (Ire) KC
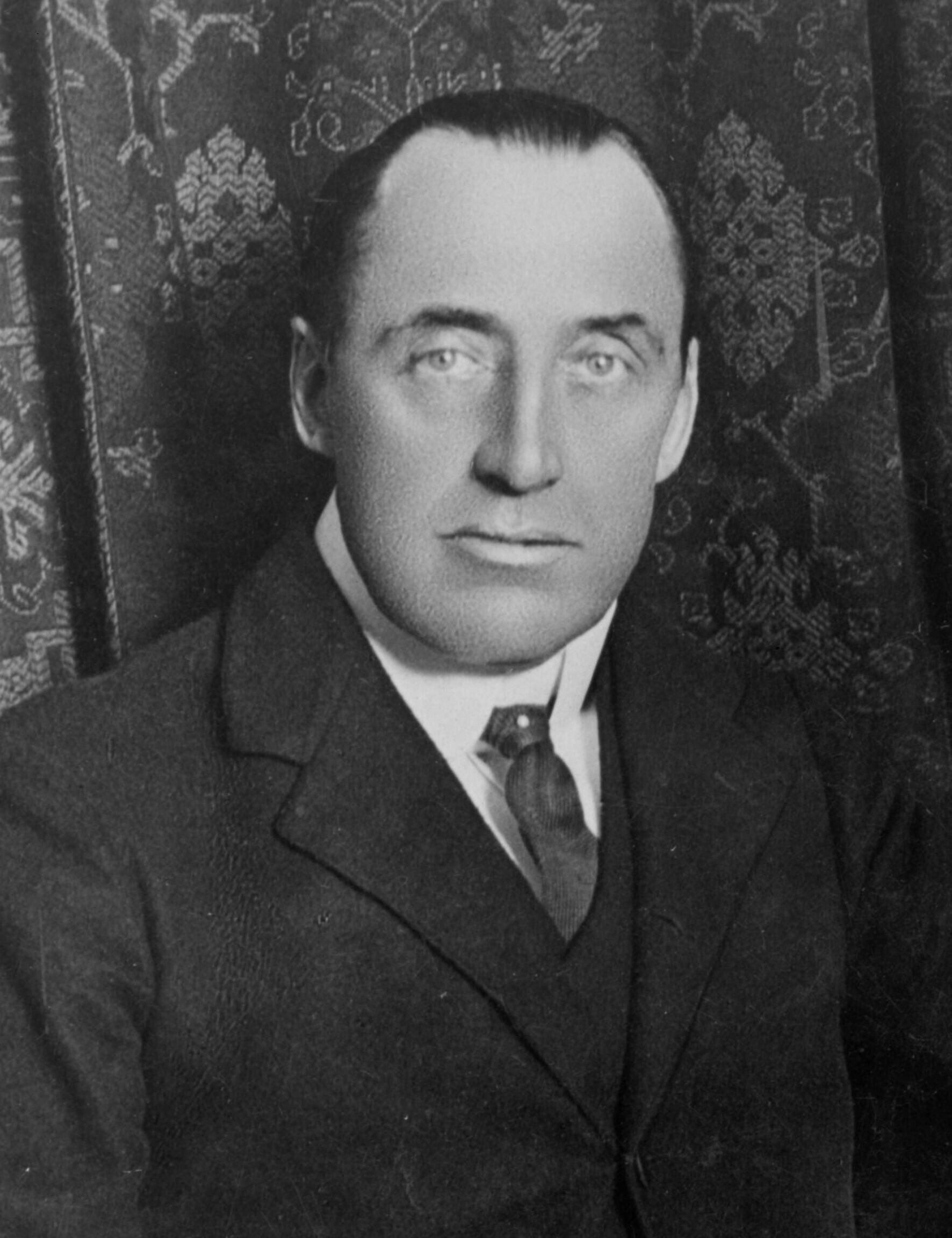
- Carson, c. 1900

Minister without portfolio
- In office 17 July 1917 – 20 January 1918 Serving with Arthur Henderson (until Aug 1917), The Viscount Milner, Jan Smuts, George Barnes (from Aug 1917)
- Prime Minister: David Lloyd George

First Lord of the Admiralty
- In office 10 December 1916 – 17 July 1917
- Prime Minister: David Lloyd George
- Preceded by: Arthur Balfour
- Succeeded by: Sir Eric Geddes

Leader of the Opposition
- In office 19 October 1915 – 6 December 1916
- Monarch: George V
- Prime Minister: H. H. Asquith
- Preceded by: Bonar Law (May 1915)
- Succeeded by: H. H. Asquith

Attorney General for England and Wales
- In office 25 May 1915 – 19 October 1915
- Prime Minister: H. H. Asquith
- Preceded by: Sir John Simon
- Succeeded by: Sir F. E. Smith

Leader of the Ulster Unionist Party
- In office June 1911 – 10 February 1921
- Preceded by: Walter Long
- Succeeded by: James Craig

Leader of the Irish Unionist Parliamentary Party
- In office 21 February 1910 – June 1921
- Preceded by: Walter Long
- Succeeded by: The Earl of Midleton

Solicitor General for England and Wales
- In office 11 May 1900 – 4 December 1905
- Prime Minister: The Marquess of Salisbury; Arthur Balfour
- Preceded by: Sir Robert Finlay
- Succeeded by: Sir William Robson

Solicitor General for Ireland
- In office 20 June 1892 – 11 August 1892
- Prime Minister: The Marquess of Salisbury
- Preceded by: John Atkinson
- Succeeded by: Charles Hemphill

Member of Parliament for Belfast Duncairn
- In office 14 December 1918 – 31 May 1921
- Preceded by: Constituency established
- Succeeded by: Thomas McConnell

Member of Parliament for Dublin University
- In office 4 July 1892 – 14 December 1918
- Preceded by: Dodgson Hamilton Madden
- Succeeded by: Sir Robert Woods

Personal details
- Born: 9 February 1854 Dublin, Ireland
- Died: 22 October 1935 (aged 81) Minster-in-Thanet, Kent, England
- Party: Irish Unionist; Ulster Unionist Party
- Other political affiliations: Liberal (until 1886); Liberal Unionist
- Spouse(s): Annette Kirwan (m. 1879; died 1913) Ruby Frewen (m. 1914)
- Children: 5
- Education: Wesley College, Dublin
- Alma mater: Trinity College Dublin (M.A., 1878)
- Profession: Politician, barrister, judge

Edward Henry Carson, Baron Carson (9 February 1854 – 22 October 1935), from 1900 to 1921 known as Sir Edward Carson, was an Irish unionist politician, barrister and judge, who was the Attorney General and Solicitor General for England, Wales and Ireland, as well as the First Lord of the Admiralty for the Royal Navy. His authority as a unionist leader saw him elevated to the British War Cabinet as a Minister without Portfolio in 1917, and he was subsequently appointed to the judicial role of Lord of Appeal in Ordinary in the House of Lords in 1921, with the political title Lord Carson of Duncairn. Due to his political campaigns in both Great Britain and Ireland, he became widely regarded as the founding father of Northern Ireland.

From 1905 onwards, Carson was both the Irish Unionist Alliance member of parliament (MP) for the Dublin University constituency and leader of the Ulster Unionist Council in Belfast. In 1915, he entered the war cabinet of H. H. Asquith as Attorney-General. However, he was defeated in his ambition to maintain Ireland as a whole in union with Great Britain. Carson was instrumental in leading the Ulster unionist resistance against the British government's attempts to introduce home rule for the whole of Ireland, and later played a key role in forcing the resignation of Prime Minister Asquith in 1916. His leadership, however, was celebrated by some for securing a continued place in the United Kingdom for the six northeastern counties, albeit under a devolved Parliament of Northern Ireland that neither he nor his fellow unionists had sought.

Carson is also remembered for his open-ended cross-examination of Oscar Wilde in a legal action that led to plaintiff Wilde being prosecuted, gaoled and ruined. He unsuccessfully attempted to intercede for Wilde after the case. Carson died in 1935 and was given a state funeral by the British government. He remains a popular and controversial figure in both Ireland and the United Kingdom, with many analysts crediting him for establishing Northern Ireland as a separate entity to the Republic, and others critiquing him for undermining Irish nationalism.

== Early life ==
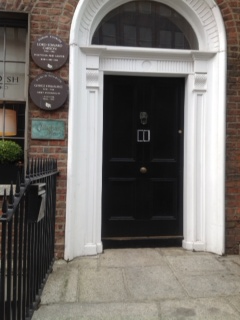
4 Harcourt Street, Dublin, where Carson was born in 1854

Edward Carson, the second son of Edward Henry Carson, architect, was born at 4 Harcourt Street, in Dublin, into a wealthy Anglican family. The Carsons were of Scottish origin, Edward's grandfather having originally moved to Dublin from Dumfries in 1815. Carson's mother was Isabella Lambert, the daughter of Captain Peter Lambert, part of an old Anglo-Irish family, the Lamberts of Castle Ellen, County Galway. Carson spent holidays at Castle Ellen, which was owned by his uncle. He was one of six children (four boys and two girls). Edward was educated at Arlington House in Portarlington, Wesley College, Dublin and Trinity College Dublin, where he read law and was an active member of the College Historical Society. Carson graduated BA and MA.

He later received an honorary doctorate (LL.D.) from the University of Dublin in June 1901.

== As a barrister ==
In 1877 Carson was called to the Irish Bar after graduating from King's Inns. He gained a reputation for fearsome advocacy and supreme legal ability and became regarded as a brilliant barrister, among the most prominent in Ireland at the time. He was also an acknowledged master of the appeal to the jury by his legal wit and oratory. He was appointed Queen's Counsel (Ireland) in 1889 and was Called to the English Bar at Middle Temple on 26 April 1893. He was twice admitted to the Inn, once on 1 November 1875 and then again on 21 April 1893, and was made a Bencher on 15 June 1900.

=== Oscar Wilde ===
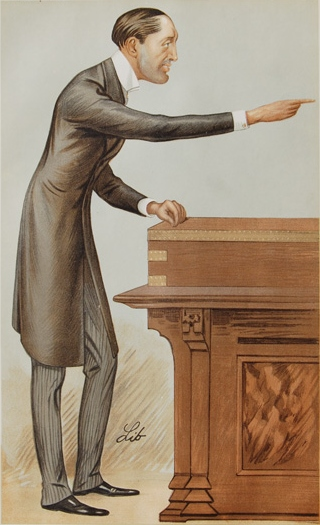
Carson addressing Parliament as depicted in Vanity Fair in 1893

In 1895, he was engaged by the Marquess of Queensberry to lead his defence against Oscar Wilde's action for criminal libel. The Marquess, angry at Wilde's ongoing homosexual relationship with his son, Lord Alfred Douglas, had left his calling card at Wilde's club with an inscription accusing Wilde of being a "posing somdomite" [sic]. Wilde retaliated with a libel action, as homosexuality was, at the time, illegal.

Kevin Myers states that Carson's initial response was to refuse to take the case. Later, he discovered that Queensberry had been telling the truth about Wilde's activity and was therefore not guilty of the libel of which Wilde accused him.

Carson portrayed the playwright as a morally depraved hedonist who seduced naïve young men into a life of homosexuality with lavish gifts and promises of a glamorous artistic lifestyle. He impugned Wilde's works as morally repugnant and designed to corrupt the upbringing of the youth. Queensberry spent a large amount of money on private detectives who investigated Wilde's activity in the London underworld of homosexual clubs and procurers.

Wilde abandoned the case when Carson announced in his opening speech for the defence that he planned to call several male prostitutes who would testify that they had had sex with Wilde, which would have rendered the libel charge unsupportable as the accusation would have been proven true. Wilde was bankrupted when he was then ordered to pay the considerable legal and detective bills Queensberry had incurred in his defence.

Based on the evidence of Queensberry's detectives and Carson's cross-examinations of Wilde at the trial, Wilde was subsequently prosecuted for gross indecency in a second trial. He was eventually found guilty and sentenced to two years' hard labour, after which he moved to France, where he died penniless.

=== Cadbury Bros. ===
In 1908 Carson appeared for the London Evening Standard in a libel action brought by George Cadbury. The Standard was controlled by Unionist interests which supported Joseph Chamberlain's Imperial Preference views. The Cadbury family were Liberal supporters of free trade and had, in 1901, purchased The Daily News. The Standard articles alleged that Cadbury Bros Ltd., which claimed to be model employers having created the village of Bournville outside Birmingham, knew of the slave labour conditions on São Tomé, the Portuguese island colony from which Cadbury purchased most of the cocoa used in the production of their chocolate.

The articles alleged that George's son William had gone to São Tomé in 1901 and observed for himself the slave conditions, and that the Cadbury family had decided to continue purchasing the cocoa grown there because it was cheaper than that grown in the British colony of the Gold Coast, where labour conditions were much better, being regulated by the Colonial Office. The Standard alleged that the Cadbury family knew that the reason cocoa from São Tomé was cheaper was because it was grown by slave labour. This case was regarded at the time as an important political case as Carson and the Unionists maintained that it showed the fundamental immorality of free trade. George Cadbury recovered contemptuous damages of one farthing in a case described as one of Carson's triumphs.

=== Archer-Shee case ===
Carson was also the victorious counsel in the 1910 Archer-Shee Case, exonerating a Royal Naval College, Osborne cadet of the charge of theft of a postal order. The cadet was from a quite prominent Roman Catholic banking family, and educated, both before and after Osborne, at Stonyhurst College. On this case, Terence Rattigan based his play The Winslow Boy.

== Politics ==
Initially a radical Liberal, Carson's political career began on 20 June 1892, when he was appointed Solicitor-General for Ireland, although he was not then a member of the House of Commons. He was elected as Member of Parliament for the Dublin University constituency in the 1892 general election as a Liberal Unionist, although overall the Liberal Party won the election.

Carson maintained his career as a barrister and was admitted to the English Bar by The Honourable Society of the Middle Temple in 1893 and from then on mainly practised in London. In 1896 he was sworn of the Irish Privy Council. He was appointed Solicitor General for England and Wales on 7 May 1900, receiving the customary knighthood upon taking office. He served in this position until the Conservative government resigned in December 1905, when he was rewarded with membership of the Privy Council.

In the 1918 general election, Sinn Féin won 73 out of the 105 Irish seats in the House of Commons. In 25 constituencies, Sinn Féin won the seats unopposed. Unionists (including Ulster Unionist Labour Association) won 26 seats, all but three of which were in the six counties that today form Northern Ireland, and the Irish Parliamentary Party won only six (down from 84), all but one in Ulster. The Labour Party did not stand in the election, allowing the electorate to decide between home rule or a republic by having a clear choice between the two nationalist parties. Irish Republicans regarded these elections as the mandate to establish the First Dáil. As such, all persons in Ireland elected to Westminster were considered to have been elected to Dáil Éireann. Had he chosen to do so, Carson could have exercised the option of attending the meeting of the First Dáil in the Mansion House on 21 January 1919. Like all of those elected to Irish seats in December 1918, he received an invitation, written in Irish, to attend. He kept the invitation as a souvenir. When his name was called out in the first roll call of the new Dáil, it was met by silence, and then laughter, from the Sinn Féin delegates and the audience in the Mansion House. He was listed as "as láthair", or absent.

== Unionism ==
In September 1911, a huge crowd of over 50,000 people gathered at a rally near Belfast where Carson made a speech in which he urged his party to take on the governance of Ulster. With the passage of the Parliament Act 1911, the Unionists faced the loss of the House of Lords' ability to thwart the passage of the new Home Rule Bill. Carson disliked many of Ulster's local characteristics and, in particular, the culture of Orangeism (although he had become an Orangeman at nineteen he left the institution shortly afterwards). He stated that their speeches reminded him of "the unrolling of a mummy. All old bones and rotten rags."

Sir Edward Carson signing the Ulster Covenant

Carson campaigned against Home Rule. He spoke against the Bill in the House of Commons and organised rallies in Ireland promoting a provisional government for "the Protestant province of Ulster" to be ready, should a third Home Rule Bill come into law.

On Sunday 28 September 1912, "Ulster Day", he was the first signatory on the Ulster Covenant, which bound 447,197 signatories to resist Home Rule with the threat that they would use "all means necessary" after Carson had established the Ulster Volunteers, the first loyalist paramilitary group. From it, the Ulster Volunteer Force was formed in January 1913 to undergo military training and purchase arms. In Parliament Carson rejected any olive branch for compromise demanding Ulster "be given a resolution rather than a stay of execution". The UVF received a large arms cache from Germany on the night of 24 April 1914. Historian Felician Prill says Germany was not trying to start a civil war, for the Ulster cause was not popular in Berlin. Later that year, a further shipment of arms from Germany was delivered to the pro-Home Rule and IRB-influenced Irish Volunteers at Howth near Dublin.

The Home Rule Bill was passed by the Commons as the Government of Ireland Act 1914 (4 & 5 Geo. 5. c. 90) on 25 May 1914 by a majority of 77 and due to the Parliament Act 1911, it did not need the Lords' consent, so the bill was awaiting royal assent. To enforce the legislation, given the activities of the Unionists, H. H. Asquith's Liberal government had prepared to send troops to Ulster. This sparked the Curragh Incident on 20 March. Together with the arming of the Irish Volunteers, Ireland was on the brink of civil war when the outbreak of the First World War led to the suspension of the Government of Ireland Act 1914's operation until the end of the war. By this time Carson had announced in Belfast that an Ulster Division would be formed from the UVF, and the 36th (Ulster) Division was swiftly organised.

Brown examines why Carson's role in 1914 made him a highly controversial figure:

But his commitment was unqualified, both to Ulster unionism and to its increasing extremism. Under Carson's leadership, with Craig as his lieutenant, discipline and organization were imposed on their supporters; proposed compromises were rejected; and plans were drawn up for a provisional government in the north, if the bill was passed, with its implementation to be resisted by the paramilitary Ulster Volunteer Force, which had been armed by illegal gun-running. It is this apparent willingness to carry resistance to virtually any length, even to risk civil war, that makes Carson so controversial.

In 1914, suffragettes Flora Drummond and Norah Dacre Fox (later known as Norah Elam) besieged Carson's home, arguing that his form of Ulster "incitement to militancy" passed without notice whilst suffragettes were charged and imprisoned for same action.

Carson spoke in Belfast on The Twelfth of July 1919 on his reaction to any implementation of Irish Home Rule: "I tell the British people this...here in your presence to-day...that if there is any attempt made to take away one jot or tittle of your rights as British citizens and the advantages which have been won in this war for freedom, I will call out the Ulster Volunteers."

In a 1921 speech opposing the pending Anglo-Irish Treaty, Carson attacked the "Tory intrigues" that had led him on the course that would partition Ireland, an outcome he opposed almost as strongly as Home Rule itself. In the course of the speech, Carson said:

What a fool I was! I was only a puppet, and so was Ulster, and so was Ireland, in the political game that was to get the Conservative Party into Power.

Later in the speech, Carson said:

But I say to my Ulster friends, and I say it with all sincerity and solemnity: Do not be led into any such false line. Stick to your old ideals of closer and closer connection with this country. The Coalition Government, after all, is not the British nation, and the British nation will certainly see you righted. Your interests lie with Great Britain. You have helped her, and you have helped her Empire, and her Empire belongs just as much to you as it does to England. Stick to it, and trust the British people.

Although considering himself proudly British, Carson also considered himself a proud Irishman stating "I am very proud as an Irishman to be a member of the British Empire".

== Cabinet member ==
On 25 May 1915, Asquith appointed Carson Attorney-General when the Coalition Government was formed after the Liberal government was brought down by the Shell Crisis and the resignation of Admiral Fisher. He resigned on 19 October, however, citing his opposition to Government policy on war in the Balkans. During Asquith's coalition government of 1915–1916, there was no formal opposition in either the Commons or the Lords. The only party not in Asquith's Liberal, Conservative, and Labour Coalition was the Irish Nationalist Party led by John Redmond. However, this party supported the government and did not function as an Opposition. After Carson, the leading figure among the Irish Unionist allies of the Conservative Party, resigned from the coalition ministry on 19 October 1915, he then became the de facto leader of those Unionists who were not members of the government, effectively Leader of the Opposition in the Commons.

He played a major role in forcing the resignation of Asquith as Prime Minister, returning to office on 10 December 1916 as First Lord of the Admiralty, and elevated to the powerful British War Cabinet as a Minister without Portfolio on 17 July 1917.

Carson was hostile to the foundation of the League of Nations as he believed that this institution would be ineffectual against war. In a speech on 7 December 1917, he said:

Talk to me of treaties! Talk to me of the League of Nations! Every Great Power in Europe was pledged by treaty to preserve Belgium. That was a League of Nations, but it failed.

Early in 1918, the government decided to extend conscription to Ireland, and that Ireland would have to be given home rule in order to make it acceptable. Carson disagreed in principle and again resigned on 21 January. He gave up his seat in Dublin University in the 1918 general election and was instead elected for Belfast Duncairn.

He continued to lead the Unionists, but when the Government of Ireland Act 1920 was introduced, advised his party to work for the exemption of six Ulster counties from Home Rule as the best compromise (a compromise he had previously rejected). This proposal passed and as a result, the Parliament of Northern Ireland was established.

In January 1921, he met in London over three days with Father O'Flanagan and Lord Justice Sir James O'Connor to try to find a mutual agreement that would end the Anglo-Irish war, but without result.

After the partition of Ireland, Carson repeatedly warned Ulster Unionist leaders not to alienate northern Catholics, as he foresaw this would make Northern Ireland unstable (see The Troubles in Ulster (1920–1922)). In 1921, he stated: "We used to say that we could not trust an Irish parliament in Dublin to do justice to the Protestant minority. Let us take care that that reproach can no longer be made against your parliament, and from the outset let them see that the Catholic minority have nothing to fear from a Protestant majority." In old age, while at London's Carlton Club, he confided to the Anglo-Irish (and Catholic) historian Sir Charles Petrie his disillusionment with Belfast politics: "I fought to keep Ulster part of the United Kingdom, but Stormont is turning her into a second-class Dominion."

Carson did not see himself as an Ulsterman and, unlike many northern unionists, it is thought he had an emotional connection with Ireland as a single entity.

== Judge ==
Carson was asked to lead the Unionists during the election to become the first Prime Minister of Northern Ireland. He declined due to his lack of connections with any Northern Ireland constituency (an opponent once taunted him saying: "He has no country, he has no caste"), and resigned the leadership of the party in February 1921. Carson was appointed one of seven Lords of Appeal in Ordinary on 24 May 1921 and was created a life peer under the Appellate Jurisdiction Act 1876 on 1 June 1921 as Baron Carson, of Duncairn in the County of Antrim.

== Later years ==
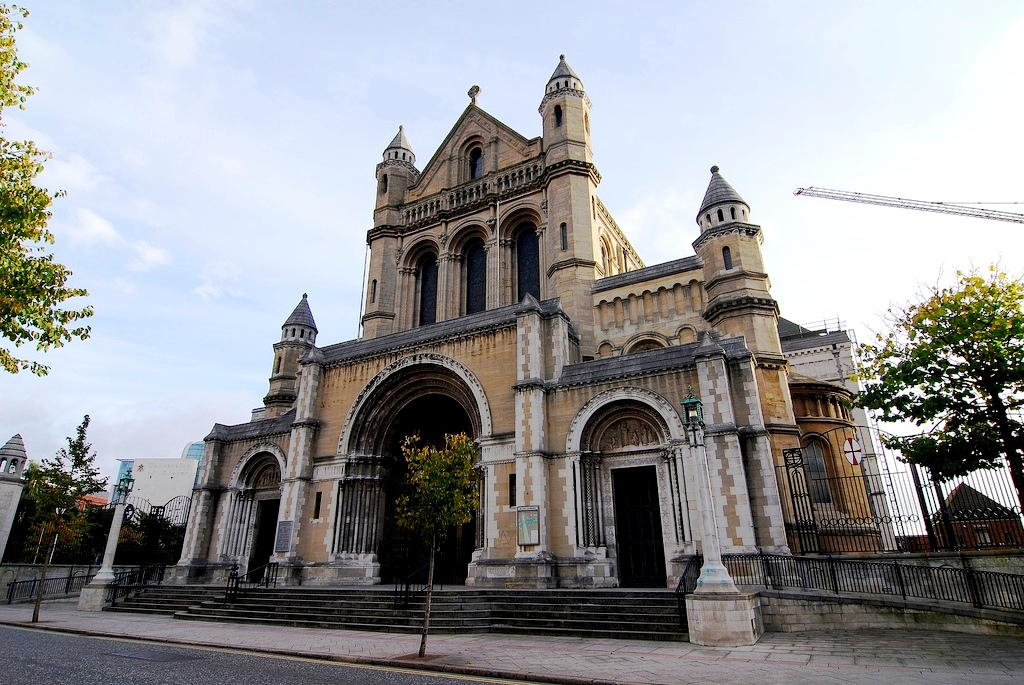
St Anne's Cathedral; Carson's final resting place

Carson retired in October 1929. In July 1933, during his last visit to Northern Ireland, he witnessed the unveiling of a large statue of himself in front of Parliament Buildings at Stormont. The statue was sculpted by L. S. Merrifield, cast in bronze, and placed upon a plinth. The inscription on the base read "By the loyalists of Ulster as an expression of their love and admiration for its subject". It was unveiled by Lord Craigavon in the presence of more than 40,000 people.

=== State funeral ===
Lord Carson (Burial) Act (Northern Ireland) 1935
- Act of Parliament
- Parliament of Northern Ireland
- Citation: 25 & 26 Geo. 5. c. 16 (N.I.)

Dates
- Royal assent: 23 October 1935

Lord Carson lived at Cleve Court, a Queen Anne house near Minster in the Isle of Thanet, Kent, bought in 1921. It was here that Carson died peacefully on 22 October 1935. Britain gave him a state funeral, which took place in Belfast at St Anne's Cathedral; he is still the only person to have been buried there. From a silver bowl, soil from each of the six counties of Northern Ireland was scattered onto his coffin, which had earlier been covered by the Union Flag, which however was removed during the service. At his funeral service the choir sang his favourite hymn, "I Vow to Thee, My Country". A warship had brought his body to Belfast and the funeral took place on Saturday 26 October 1935. Thousands of ship workers stopped work and bowed their heads as HMS Broke steamed slowly up Belfast Lough, with Carson's flag-draped coffin sat on the quarterdeck. This would be the last state funeral for a non-member of the royal family until the funeral of Winston Churchill in 1965.

=== Memories ===
Even before his death, there was an organized effort to portray Carson as the heroic embodiment of the militant unionist spirit. In November 1932, the new Stormont Parliament became the greatest Carson monument, giving his admirers the symbolic endorsement of their state. His statue was unveiled as the speakers excited the audience with triumphalist images of Protestant deliverance from Catholic tyranny. Carson's funeral in 1935 was attended with pomp and unionist symbolism, as happened again with the dedication of a plaque in his memory in 1938. Calling for unity with Britain, numerous ceremonial rituals, memorials, and anniversaries affirmed the legitimacy of the state, and the Protestant ascendancy.

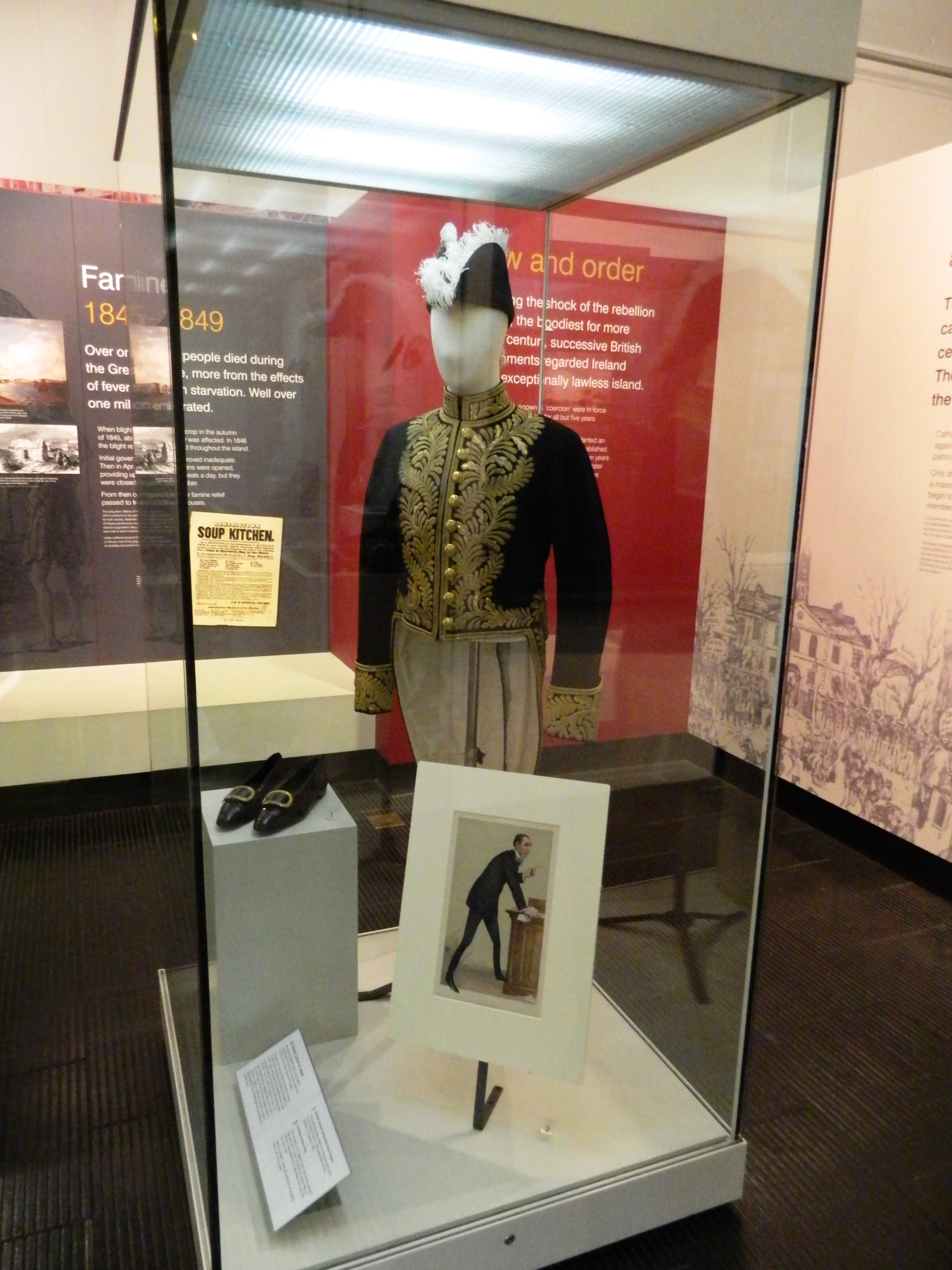
Carson's ceremonial dress uniform, worn on his appointment as Solicitor General for England in 1900. This is in the Ulster Museum

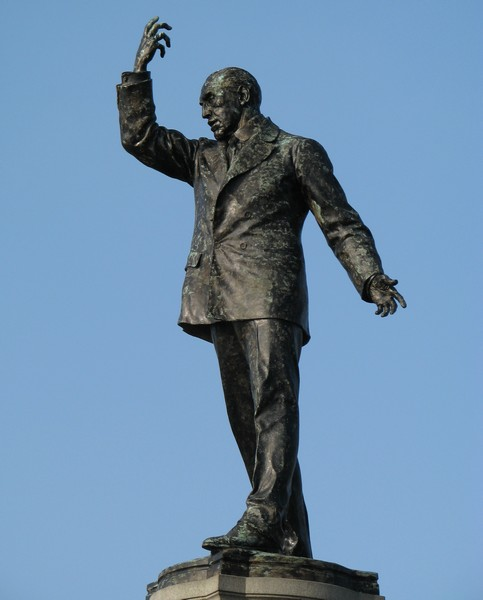
Lord Carson's statue at Stormont

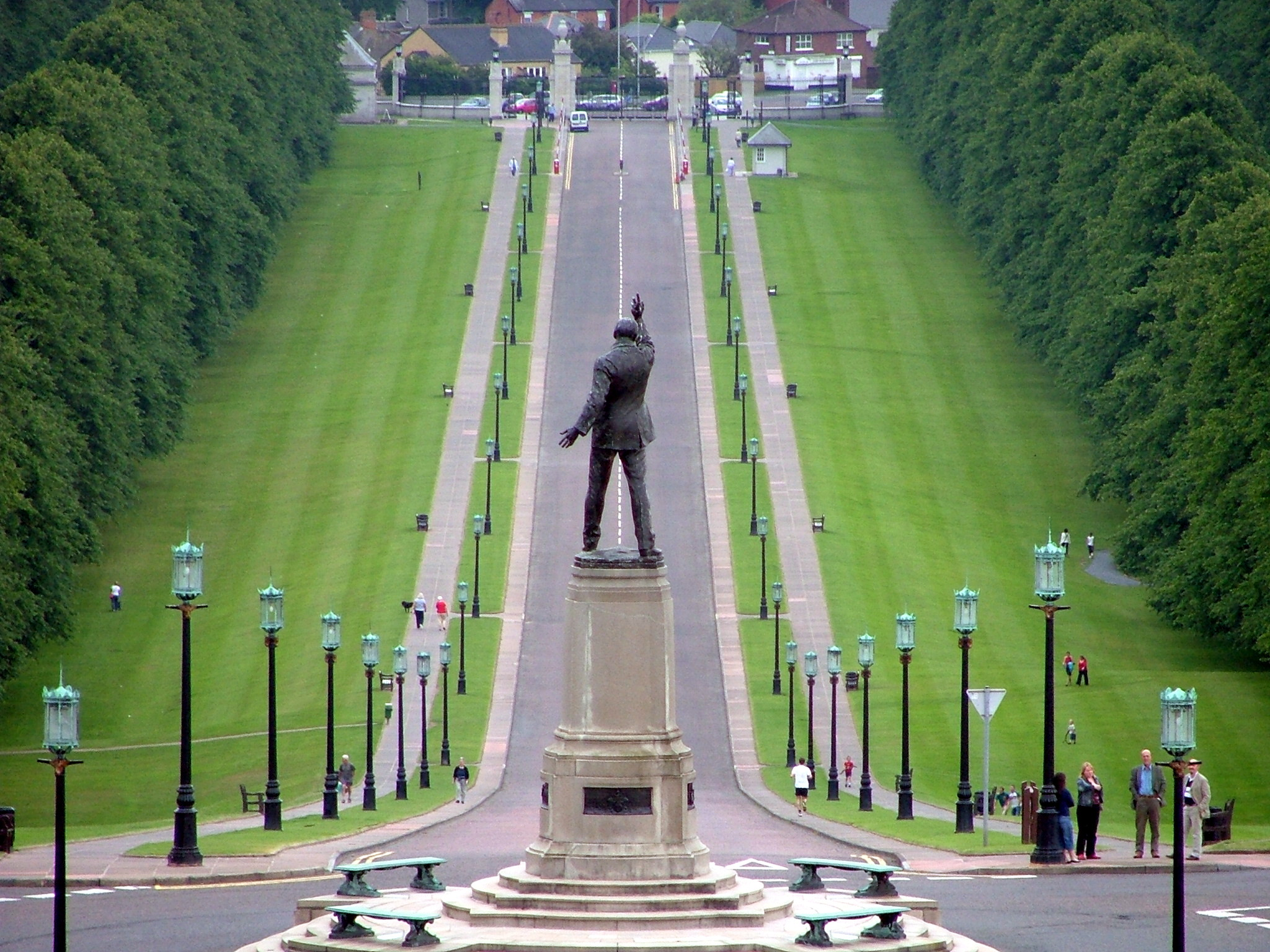
Edward Carson's statue at Stormont

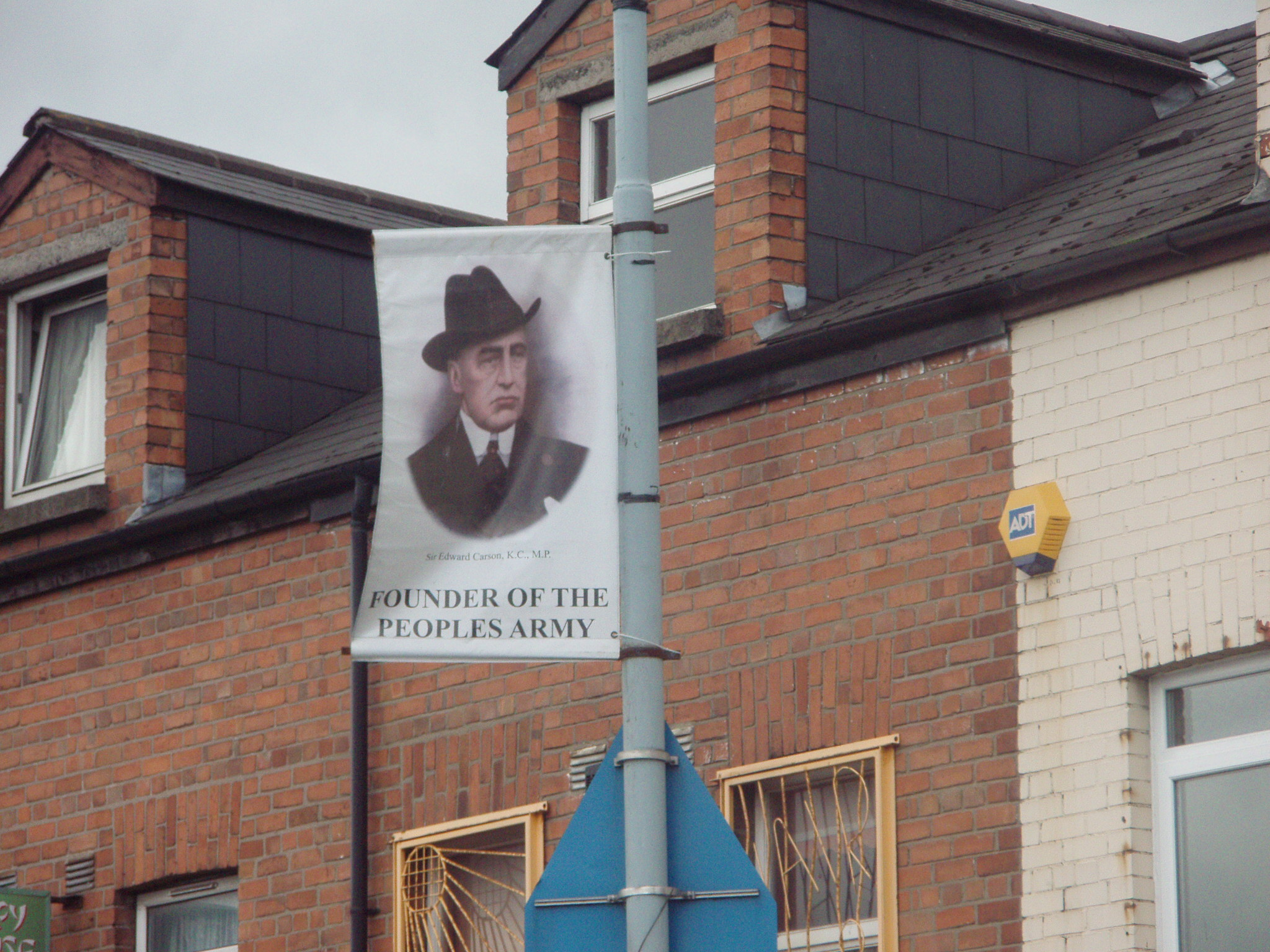
Carson Poster, Belfast, August 2007

== Private life ==
Carson married twice. His first wife was Annette Kirwan from County Galway, daughter of Henry Persse Kirwan, a retired County Inspector of the Royal Irish Constabulary. They were married on 19 December 1879. He had two sons and two daughters by his first wife (he described them as a "rum lot"), namely:

- The Hon. William Henry Lambert Carson, born 2 October 1880 (d. 1930)
- The Hon. Aileen Seymour Carson, born 13 November 1881
- The Hon. Gladys Isobel Carson, born 1885
- The Hon. Walter Seymour Carson, born 1890

The first Lady Carson died in 1913. His second wife was Ruby Frewen (1881–1966), the daughter of Lt.-Col. Stephen Frewen, later Frewen-Laton MP (1857–1933) and Emily Augusta (Peacocke) Frewen. They were married on 17 September 1914; she was 32 and he was 60. They had one son:

- The Hon. Edward Carson MP, born 17 February 1920

== Arms ==
Coat of arms of Edward Carson

Notes
Granted 1931
Crest
An elephant statant supporting with the trunk a fasces Or.
Torse
Argent and Gules.
Escutcheon
Argent on a chevron couped Gules between three crescents Sable two fasces chevronwise Or.
Motto
Dum Spiro Spero

Parliament of the United Kingdom
Preceded by David Plunket; Dodgson Hamilton Madden	Member of Parliament for Dublin University; 1892–1918; With: Hon. David Plunket 1892–1895; W.E.H. Lecky 1895–1903; James Campbell 1903–1917; Arthur Samuels 1917–1918	Succeeded by Arthur Samuels; Sir Robert Woods
New constituency	Member of Parliament for Belfast Duncairn; 1918–1921	Succeeded by Thomas McConnell
Legal offices
Preceded by John Atkinson	Solicitor-General for Ireland; 1892	Succeeded by Charles Hemphill
Preceded by Sir Robert Finlay	Solicitor General for England and Wales; 1900–1905	Succeeded by Sir William Robson
Preceded by Sir John Simon	Attorney General for England and Wales; 1915	Succeeded by Sir F. E. Smith
Political offices
Preceded by Arthur Balfour	First Lord of the Admiralty; 1916–1917	Succeeded by Sir Eric Geddes
Preceded by —	Minister without Portfolio and Member of the War Cabinet; 1917–1919	Succeeded by —
Vacant Title last held by Bonar Law on 25 May 1915	Leader of the Opposition; October 1915–6 December 1916	Succeeded by H. H. Asquith
Party political offices
Preceded by Walter Long	Leader of the Irish Unionist Parliament Party; 1910–1921	Succeeded by none
Preceded by Walter Long	Leader of the Ulster Unionist Party; 1910–1921	Succeeded by Sir James Craig, Bt
