= Irish Unionist Alliance =

- Leader: Colonel Saunderson (First); The 11th Baron Farnham (Last)
- Founded: 1891; 135 years ago
- Dissolved: 1922; 104 years ago
- Merger of: Irish Conservatives; Irish Loyal and Patriotic Union
- Succeeded by: Ulster Unionist Party
- Ideology: Conservatism; Irish unionism Anglo-Irish interests
- National affiliation: Conservative Party

The Irish Unionist Alliance (IUA), also known as the Irish Unionist Party, Irish Unionists or simply the Unionists, was a unionist political party founded in Ireland in 1891 from a merger of the Irish Conservative Party and the Irish Loyal and Patriotic Union (ILPU) to oppose plans for home rule for Ireland within the United Kingdom of Great Britain and Ireland. The party was led for much of its existence by Colonel Edward James Saunderson and later by St John Brodrick, 1st Earl of Midleton. In total, eighty-six members of the House of Lords affiliated themselves with the Irish Unionist Alliance, although its broader membership among Irish voters outside Ulster was relatively small.

The party aligned itself closely with the Conservative Party and Liberal Unionists to campaign to prevent the passage of a new Home Rule Bill. Its MPs took the Conservative whip at Westminster, and its members were often described as 'Conservatives' or 'Conservative Unionists', even though much of its support came from former Liberal voters. Among its most prominent members were the Dublin barrister, Sir Edward Carson, and the founder of Ireland's cooperative movement, Sir Horace Plunkett. Its electoral strength was largely (although not exclusively) concentrated in east Ulster and south Dublin.

The IUA became wracked by internal disagreement during the early twentieth century, with the issue of the partition of Ireland proving to be particularly divisive. Many unionists outside Ulster became resigned to the political necessity of Home Rule, while unionists in Ulster established a separate organisation, the Ulster Unionist Party (UUP). In 1919 the IUA finally split apart with the founding of the break-away Unionist Anti-Partition League, effectively signalling the death of institutional unionism in most of Ireland. The UUP continued to operate in Northern Ireland, and would go on to dominate domestic politics there for much of the twentieth century.

== History ==
=== Foundation ===
The Irish Unionist Alliance was founded in 1891 by the members of the Irish Loyal and Patriotic Union (ILPU), which it replaced. The ILPU had been established to prevent electoral competition between Liberals and Conservatives in the three southern provinces on a common platform of maintenance of the union. The IUA united this movement with unionists in the northern province of Ulster, where unionist sentiment and support was strongest. As such, the new party sought to represent unionism on an all-Ireland basis. The party's founders hoped that this would coordinate the electoral and lobbying activities of unionists across Ireland. Prior to 1891, unionists had seen considerable electoral losses across southern Ireland at the hands of the pro-Home Rule Irish Parliamentary Party, founded a decade earlier. It was deemed necessary for southern and northern supporters of the Union to more formally unite their efforts. At this stage, the majority of unionists in all parts of Ireland were opposed to the Irish Home Rule movement, especially following the collapse of the Irish wing of the Liberal Party. The IUA's first leader was the Orangeman and former Conservative MP, Edward James Saunderson.

=== 1891–1914 ===
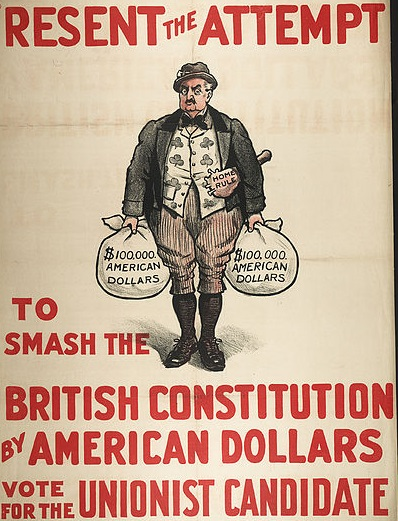
A Unionist anti-John Redmond poster from the 1910 election

In the House of Commons, the party closely aligned itself with the Conservatives and Liberal Unionists. In the 1892 general election the party won 20.6% of the Irish vote and 21 seats. In 1893, the party achieved a major success when it joined the Conservatives to defeat the Home Rule Bill. In the House of Lords, eighty-six peers affiliated themselves with the Irish Unionist Alliance. This high level of support reflected the strong unionist sentiment within Ireland's landed class. Unionists in the Lords proved to be instrumental in defeating attempts by the Liberals to introduce Home Rule legislation. In the 1900 general election the party won 32.2% of the vote in Ireland, most of its votes coming from Ulster.

Throughout the period, members of the IUA campaigned not only in Ireland, but also in Great Britain alongside the Conservative Party. This was especially the case in the two general elections of 1910. In December 1910, the IUA sent 278 workers to British constituencies to assist the Conservative candidates, distributing almost three million leaflets across England. It was during that this time that a large number of Conservative MPs married into Irish Southern Unionist families.

Despite early hopes among some unionists that the IUA would expand the unionist presence across Ireland, the party failed to make any major electoral gains in the six subsequent general elections. In the south of Ireland, the IUA consistently won only the double seat representing the graduates of Dublin University, and a couple of the Dublin seats would occasionally fall to them. The party also won a surprise victory in Galway Borough in 1900. In local elections, the party maintained a geographically broader representation, although failed to win many new voters. Unlike in Ulster, the anti-Home Rulers were a scattered minority.

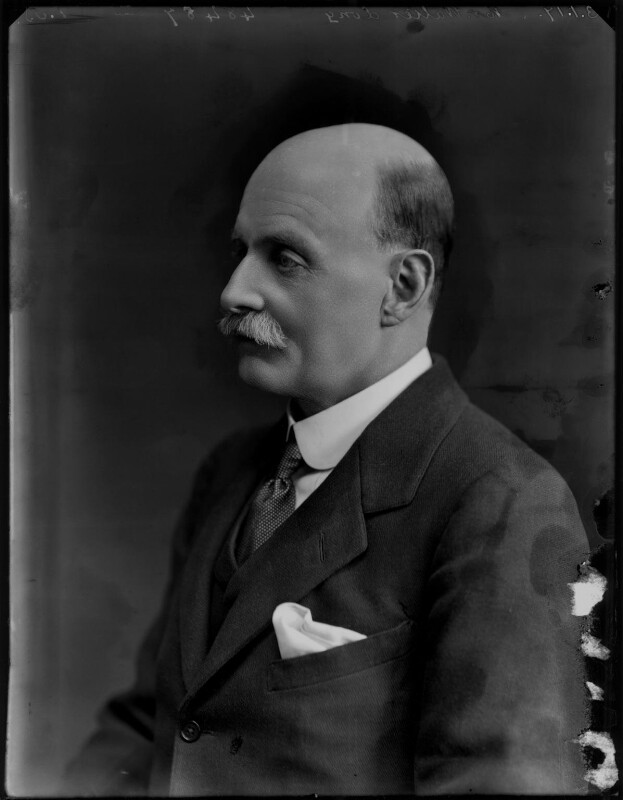
Walter Long was leader of the Irish Unionist Party in the House of Commons from 1906 to 1910

In Ulster, the IUA built upon solid unionist electoral foundations and became the dominant political force in much of the province. In the north and east of Ulster, unionists consistently won seats, often unopposed. In the three counties of Ulster which would later become part of the Irish Free State, the unionists failed to come close to winning in Monaghan North, their strongest constituency of the eight in question, and never even contested West Donegal. Despite the prominence of many influential Southern Unionists in the party, Ulster remained the core of the IUA's support base. Ulster unionism was linked strongly to the former Conservatives, with their strong Orange Order links, rather than to the former Liberals, who had made some effort to encourage cross-denominational support for their unionist stance. The strength of the northern unionist wing played a vital role in the shift of power in the pro-union movement to Conservative and Orange elements. While the link between the Orange lodges and the new Unionist associations did introduce a populist, democratic element into unionist politics, it also served to reinforce the sectarian nature of unionism in the north. In 1905, this particular brand of unionism within the IUA led to the establishment of the Ulster Unionist Council (UUC). Although Ulster Unionists were still within the broader framework of the Irish Unionist Alliance, the Ulster party began to develop its own distinct organisational structures and political goals. From 1907, the IUA's political activity was organised by the Joint Committee of the Unionist Associations of Ireland (JCUAI). This body sought to coordinate the IUA's election and lobbying activity, whilst recognising the distinct differences between the northern and southern parties.

The prominence of the Ulster Unionist Council quickly grew thanks to the strong unionist sentiment in Ulster. From 1910, it became the dominant force and focus of resistance in the Irish unionist community. The JCUAI was effectively controlled by Ulstermen, while the IUA's leadership remained largely in the hands of Southern Unionists. This led to the unionist movement gradually becoming 'Ulsterised' from 1910, which marginalised many more moderate unionists in the south. Even so, in 1913, as the Third Home Rule Bill passed through Parliament, the Alliance appears to have become increasingly popular in the south and records show an increase in membership.

=== Division (1914–1922) ===
The 1918 general election result in Ireland, showing the clear dominance of the IUA in Ulster, relative to its weakness in the rest of Ireland

By 1914, the conflict of interest between the unionists in southern Ireland and those in Ulster was wracking the IUA. It was known that the passage of a Home Rule Bill for Ireland was becoming increasingly likely, and as a result many Southern Unionists began to seek a political compromise which would see their interests protected. Many unionists in the south became strongly opposed to any plan to partition the island, as they knew that it would leave them isolated from the unionist-majority areas. Several prominent Southern Unionists, such as Sir Horace Plunkett and Lord Monteagle, became convinced that a degree of home rule was going to be necessary if Ireland was to avoid partition and remain in the Union. Others, such as the anti-partition party leader the 9th Viscount Midleton (later created the 1st Earl of Midleton in 1920), resented the growing dominance of Ulstermen in the party. Lord Midleton and his supporters feared that the Ulster wing of the party (now more formally organised as the Ulster Unionist Party) would abandon the south in order to gain a favourable settlement for the north from the British government. In October 1913, the vice-chairman of the IUA, G. F. Stewart, had written to its leader, Sir Edward Carson, to complain that southern concerns were being ignored. Several large unionist demonstrations took place in Dublin in early 1914, in which protesters complained as much about the Ulster Unionists as the Irish nationalists. Despite these internal difficulties, between September 1911 and July 1914 the Joint Committee of the Unionist Associations of Ireland continued its campaign across the British Isles. In this period, the IUA distributed an estimated six million pamphlets and booklets throughout Britain, canvassed 1.5 million voters and arranged 8,800 meetings.

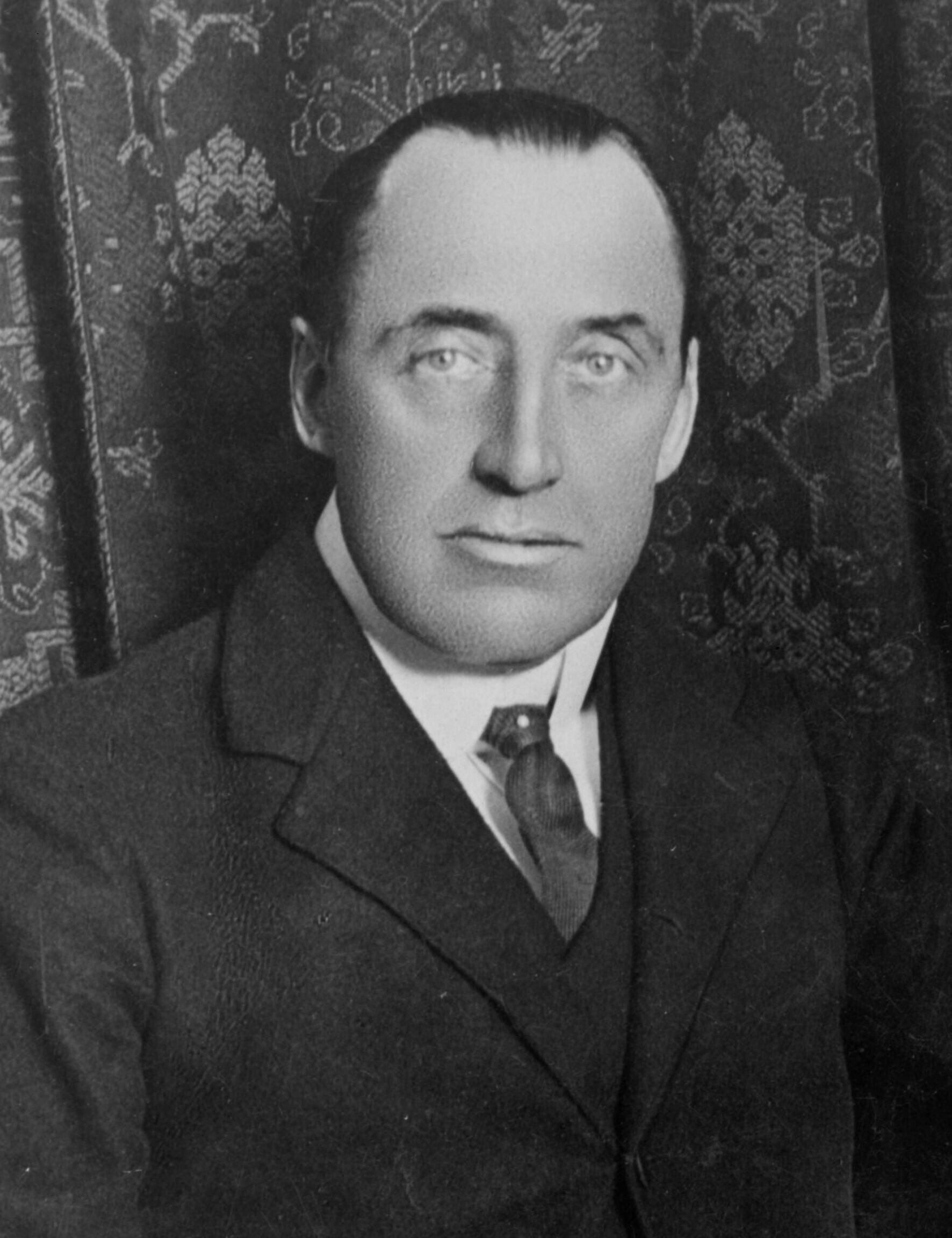
Edward Carson led the Irish Unionist Parliamentary Party from 1910 and 1921, during which time the party became increasingly divided between northern and southern unionist interests

The internal divisions simmered during the First World War. Southern Unionist members sided with Irish Nationalists against the Ulster Unionists during the 1917–18 Irish Convention in an attempt to bring about an understanding on the implementation of the suspended Home Rule Act 1914. The Alliance's official opposition to partition led to it being marginalised in the 1918 general election, which showed the rising influence of the republican Sinn Féin party on the one hand and the strength of Ulster Unionist Council on the other. Despite this, the Alliance won its largest number of seats, with the IUA candidate managing to win a surprise victory in Rathmines. Against the backdrop of the subsequent Irish War of Independence unionists began to openly disagree. At a meeting of the party on Molesworth Street, Dublin, on 24 January 1919, Lord Midleton proposed a motion to the party which would have denied Ulster Unionists a say on government proposals affecting the south of Ireland. The motion was defeated, with a majority of both southern and northern unionists rejecting the plan. Ulster Unionists believed that the motion would have the effect of dividing the unionist cause. The party split anyway, with Lord Midleton and senior southern leaders forming the break-away Unionist Anti-Partition League that same day. Many ordinary members of the southern IUA (Protestant farmers, shopkeepers and clergymen) initially stayed with the remaining rump of the IUA in the south, led by the 11th Baron Farnham, a County Cavan landowner.

Although the IUA hoped to play a part in the Parliament of Southern Ireland envisaged under the 1920 Home Rule Act, the parliament never functioned. The Irish Times, said to be the "voice of Southern Unionists", realised that the 1920 Act would not work and argued from late 1920 for "Dominion Home Rule", the compromise that was eventually agreed upon in the 1921–22 Anglo-Irish Treaty. Under the Treaty, Northern Ireland became a part of the Irish Free State from its creation on 6 December 1922; the Parliament of Northern Ireland voted to leave the Free State two days later.

==== Irish Free State ====
The split effectively ended the realistic electoral chances of the Irish Unionist Alliance in what became the Irish Free State. The results of the 1920 Irish local elections show that, outside of Ulster, unionist support was strongest in urban areas. As the partition of Ireland became more likely, Southern Unionists (those unionists outside of nine-county Ulster) formed numerous political movements in an attempt to find a solution to the "Irish Question". Among these were the Irish Dominion League and the Irish Centre Party. As such, the southern rump of the IUA became increasingly fractured and in 1922 it lost its reason to exist with the establishment of the Irish Free State. Leading unionist figures, such as the 1st Earl of Midleton (as he had become in 1920), the 4th Earl of Dunraven and Mount-Earl, the 1st Baron Glenavy and Sir Horace Plunkett, were appointed in December 1922 by W. T. Cosgrave to the Free State's first Senate. Amongst others, Sir Horace Plunkett's home in County Dublin was then burnt down during the Irish Civil War (1922–23) because of his involvement in the Irish Senate. The IUA helped form the Southern Irish Loyalist Relief Association to assist war refugees and claim compensation for damage to property. From 1921 IUA voters began to support the mainstream Cumann na nGaedheal party.

In the 1923 election three formerly loyalist businessmen were elected as the Business and Professional Group. From 1921 to 1991 the proportion of Southern Irish Protestants declined from 10% to 3% of the population; these had provided the bulk of the IUA's support base. Unionists continued to have a majority on Rathmines Council until 1929, when the IUA's successors lost their last elected representatives in the Irish Free State.

==== Northern Ireland ====
In Northern Ireland, unionists of the Ulster Unionist Party (UUP; previously known as the Ulster Unionist Council) continued to dominate domestic politics. The party would hold its powerful position in the unionist community for much of the rest of the twentieth century, until the rise of the Democratic Unionist Party (DUP) in the late 1980s.

== General election results ==
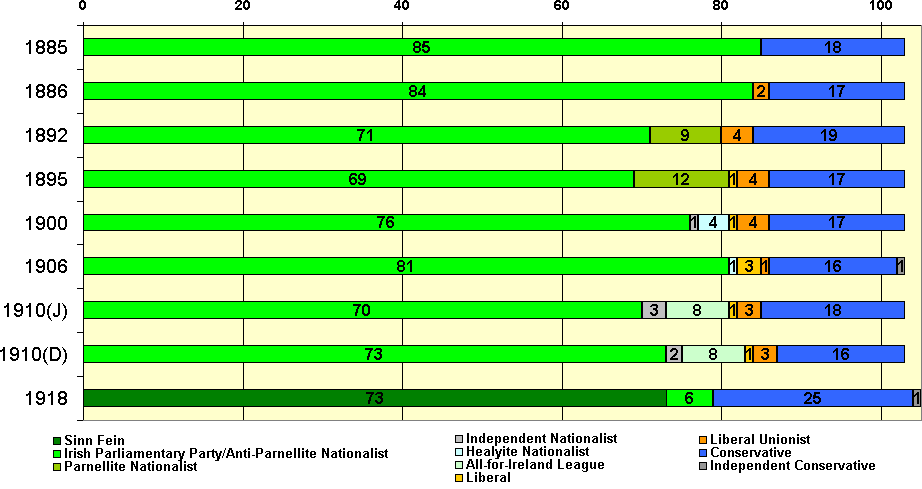
Graph of Irish UK MPs 1885–1918 in numbers

Election	House of Commons	Seats	Government	Votes
1892	25th Parliament	19 / 103	Liberal victory	12.5%
1895	26th Parliament	17 / 103	Conservative and Liberal Unionist victory	
1900	27th Parliament	17 / 103	Conservative and Liberal Unionist victory	32.2%
1906	28th Parliament	16 / 103	Liberal victory	42.7%
1910 (Jan)	29th Parliament	18 / 103	Liberal government in hung Parliament	32.7%
1910 (Dec)	30th Parliament	16 / 103	Liberal government in hung Parliament	28.6%
1918	31st Parliament	25 / 105	Coalition victory	25.3%

Note: Results from Ireland for the UK general elections contested by the Irish Unionist Alliance. These figures do not include MPs elected for the Liberal Unionists, who were officially a separate party. IUA MPs sat with the Liberal Unionists and Conservatives at Westminster, and were often simply called 'Conservatives' or 'Unionists'.

== Support base ==
=== Southern Unionists ===
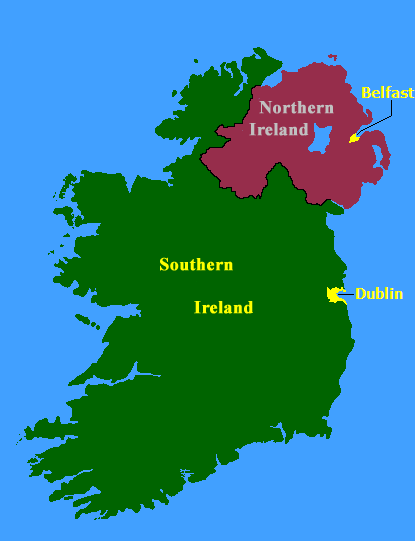
Northern Ireland and the Republic of Ireland after partition

The leadership of southern unionism was dominated by wealthy, well-educated men who wanted to live in Ireland, felt British and Irish, and who had Irish roots. Many were members of the privileged Anglo-Irish class, who valued their cultural affiliations with the British Empire, and had close personal connections to the aristocracy in Britain. This led to their pejorative description by some opponents as "West Brits". They were generally members of the Anglican Church of Ireland, although there were several notable Catholic unionists, such as The 5th Earl of Kenmare, and Sir Antony MacDonnell. Many of the IUA's leading figures were associated with the Kildare Street Club, a gentleman's club in Dublin. The electoral support base of the IUA in southern Ireland was largely drawn from its Protestant population, many of whom were farmers, small business owners or Church of Ireland clergymen. In 1913, the IUA had a southern core of 683 members, with approximately 300,000 supporters spread across the three southern provinces. In March 1919 Sir Maurice Dockrell told the House of Commons that the supporting population was "about 350,000". The IUA never achieved "mass party" status in the south. Its local branches varied in strength, and generally followed geographic patterns of Protestant population density. As a result, the IUA's support base was severely limited to certain sections of the population, described as usually being "Protestant, anglicised, propertied and aristocratic".

Although their numbers were small, a considerable amount of industry in Southern Ireland had been developed indigenously by Southern Unionist supporters. These included Jacob's Biscuits, Bewley's, Beamish and Crawford, Brown Thomas, Cantrell & Cochrane, Denny's Sausages, Findlaters, Jameson's Whiskey, W.P. & R. Odlum, Cleeve's, R&H Hall, Dockrell's, Arnott's, Elverys, Goulding Chemicals, Smithwick's, The Irish Times and the Guinness brewery, then southern Ireland's largest company. They controlled financial entities such as the Bank of Ireland and Goodbody Stockbrokers. They were concerned that a new home rule state might create new taxes between them and their markets in Britain and the Empire, that would add to their costs and probably reduce sales and therefore employment.

Many Southern Unionist landowners had inherited large estates. From 1903, many of these were persuaded to sell land to their tenant farmers under the Land Purchase (Ireland) Act 1903. As a group, Southern Unionist landowners were richer than their fellow Irishmen by about £90 million by 1914, which would either stay in the Irish economy, given a favourable political arrangement, or leave if the outcome appeared too uncertain or too radical. This temporarily gave them a voice far beyond their number in the Irish electorate. Some of the more progressive supporters of the IUA attempted to introduce a moderate form of devolution through the Irish Reform Association. Many Southern Unionists were members of the landed gentry, and these were prominent in horse breeding and racing, and as British Army officers.

Southern Unionists are regarded as having been considerably less confrontational than their Ulster neighbours. They were always in the minority in southern Ireland, and many had close personal connections with figures in nationalist politics. As a group, they never threatened or organised violence in order to resist Home Rule or partition, and were generally placid in their politics. Lord Midleton described Southern Unionists as "lacking political insight and cohesion" and "restricting themselves to the easy task of attending meetings in Dublin". In discussing problems of civic morality in 2011 in the Republic of Ireland, former Taoiseach Garret FitzGerald remarked that before 1922, "In Ireland a strong civic sense did exist – but mainly amongst Protestants and especially Anglicans".

=== Ulster Unionists ===
Ulster Unionists were largely Protestant Presbyterians, rather than Anglicans. The Ulster support base was considerably more working class than in the south. Although often led by aristocrats, the IUA attracted high levels of support in some of the poorer areas of Belfast. Many Ulster Unionists were also drawn from the province's prosperous middle class, who had benefited greatly from heavy industrialisation in the region. As such, many in Northern Ireland supported unionism due to the industrial growth of Belfast after 1850, which depended on the economic integrity of the Union. The Protestant religious composition and concentration, motivation and ethos of the Ulster Unionists made its wing of the IUA distinct from unionists in the south, and a fear of Rome Rule (the worry about a Catholic-controlled Irish parliament) dominated the political discourse. These factors made Ulster Unionists noticeably more confrontational and violent in their political rhetoric and action. In the tense period between the Parliament Act 1911 and the Home Rule Act 1914, the Ulster unionists created their own paramilitary group, the "Ulster Volunteers", raising the spectre of civil war. The volunteer force was created by the leader of the Irish Unionist Alliance, Edward Carson. This tradition of resistance to Irish nationalism would later manifest itself in groups such as the Ulster Defence Association and the Ulster Volunteer Force during The Troubles.

== Leadership ==
The Irish Unionist Alliance had no formal method of electing and deposing of its leadership, and leaders of the IUA were more informally 'acknowledged' by other prominent figures. The party's first leader was Colonel Edward James Saunderson, a former Conservative Member of Parliament, who was most active in attempting to create an all-Ireland unionist movement. Towards the end of the party's existence, leadership became fractured between the northern and southern unionist movements within the alliance.

=== Leaders ===
Name	Tenure
The Right Honourable; Edward James Saunderson; MP for North Armagh	1891–1906
The Right Honourable; Walter Long; MP for South Dublin	1906–1910
The Right Honourable; Sir Edward Carson; MP for Dublin University	1910–1921

- The 9th Viscount Midleton (1910–1919; created 1st Earl of Midleton in 1920), as leader of the Southern Unionists
- The 11th Baron Farnham (1919–1922), as leader of the Southern Unionists
