= Home front =

Civilian contribution to a war effort

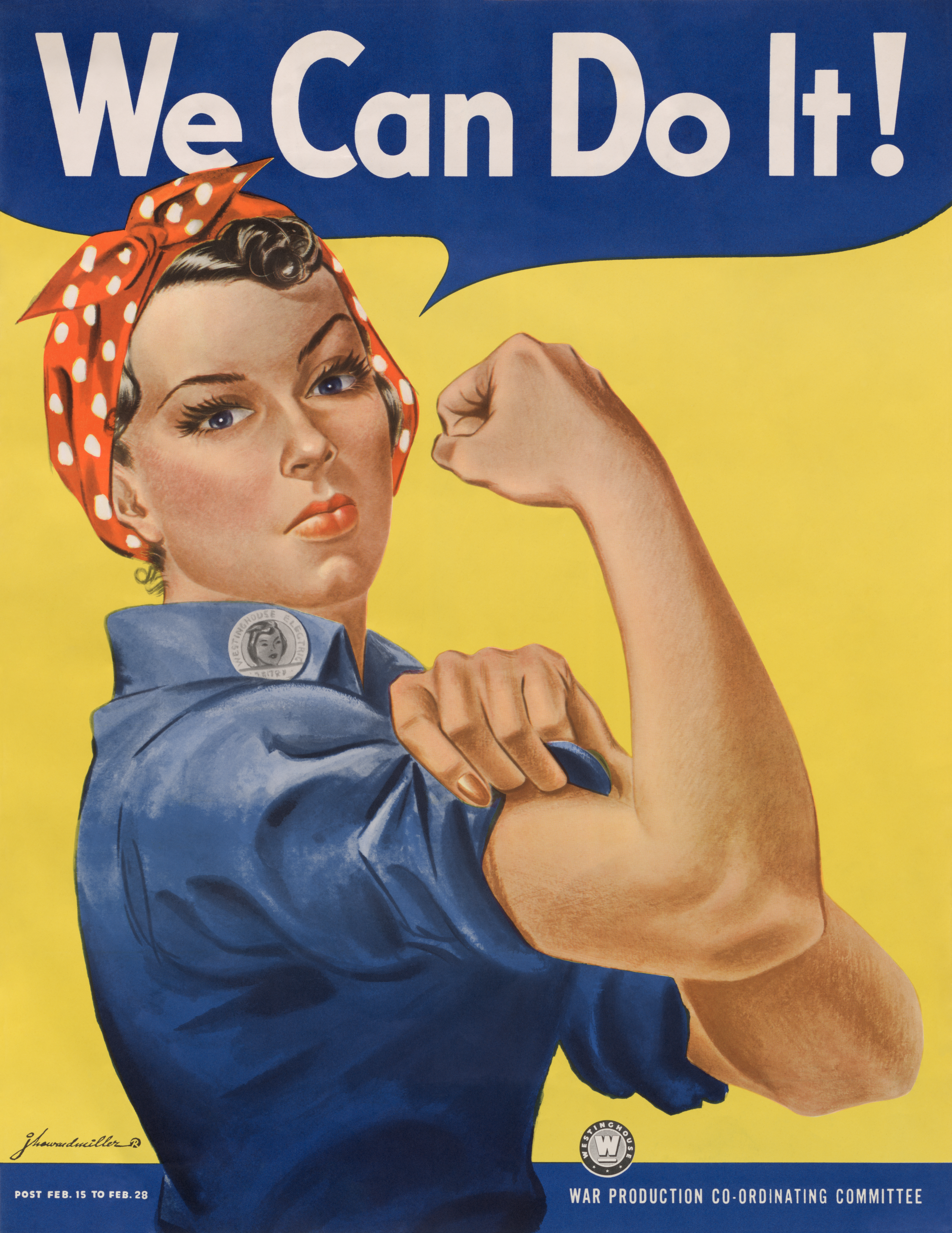
The "We Can Do It!" poster was widely seen on the United States home front during World War II; it became popular in the 1980s. Today, it is often associated with the cultural icon Rosie the Riveter, although it does not actually depict her.

"I am a good war hen, I eat little and produce a lot." French poster from World War I.

Home front is an English language term with analogues in other languages. It is commonly used to describe the civilian populace of the nation at war as an active support system for their military.

Civilians are traditionally uninvolved in combat, except when the hostilities happen to reach their residential areas. However, the expanded destructive capabilities of modern warfare posed an increased direct threat to civilian populations. With the rapid increase of military technology, the term "military effort" has changed to include the "home front" as a reflection of both a civilian "sector" capacity to produce arms, as well as the structural or policy changes which deal with its vulnerability to direct attack.

This continuity of "military effort" from fighting combat troops to manufacturing facilities has profound effects for the concept of "total war". By this logic, if factories and workers producing material are part of the war effort, they become legitimate targets for attack, rather than protected non-combatants. Hence, in practice, both sides in a conflict attack civilians and civilian infrastructure, with the understanding that they are legitimate and lawful targets in war. This military view of civilian targets has effects on the equity of applied legal principles on which the prosecution of crimes against humanity are based.

The concept of civilians' involvement in war also developed in connection with general development and change of the ideological attitude to the state. In feudal society and also in absolute monarchy the state was perceived as essentially belonging to the monarch and the aristocracy, ruling over a mass of passive commoners; wars were perceived as a contest between rival rulers, conducted "above the head" of the commoners, who were expected to submit to the victor. However even given this, in feudal societies the income of estates and nations, and therefore the wealth and power of monarchs and aristocrats, was proportional to the number of commoners available to work the land. By killing, terrorizing, destroying property and driving away a nobleman's serfs, a tactic known as chevauchée, an attacker could hope either to diminish the strength of an opponent or to force an opponent to give battle.

In contrast, since the French Revolution, the state was increasingly perceived as belonging to "the People", a perception shared—though in different forms—by democracy, communism and fascism. A logical conclusion was that war has become everybody's business and that also those not taken into the military must still "do their part" and "fight on the home front".

== History ==
The importance of civilian manufacturing and support services in a nation's capacity to fight a war first became apparent during the twenty-five years of the French Revolutionary and Napoleonic wars when the United Kingdom was able to finance and, to a lesser extent, arm and supply the various coalitions which opposed France. Although Britain had a much smaller population than France, its global maritime trade and its early industrialisation meant that its economy was much larger than that of France, which allowed Britain to offset the French manpower advantage.

During the American Civil War, the capacity of Northern factories and agriculture proved as decisive in winning the war as the skills of the generals of either side.

=== World War I ===
During World War I, the British Shell Crisis of 1915 and the appointment of David Lloyd George as Minister of Munitions was a recognition that the whole economy would have to be geared for war if the Allies were to prevail on the Western Front. The United States home front during World War I saw the first ring World War II.

=== World War II ===
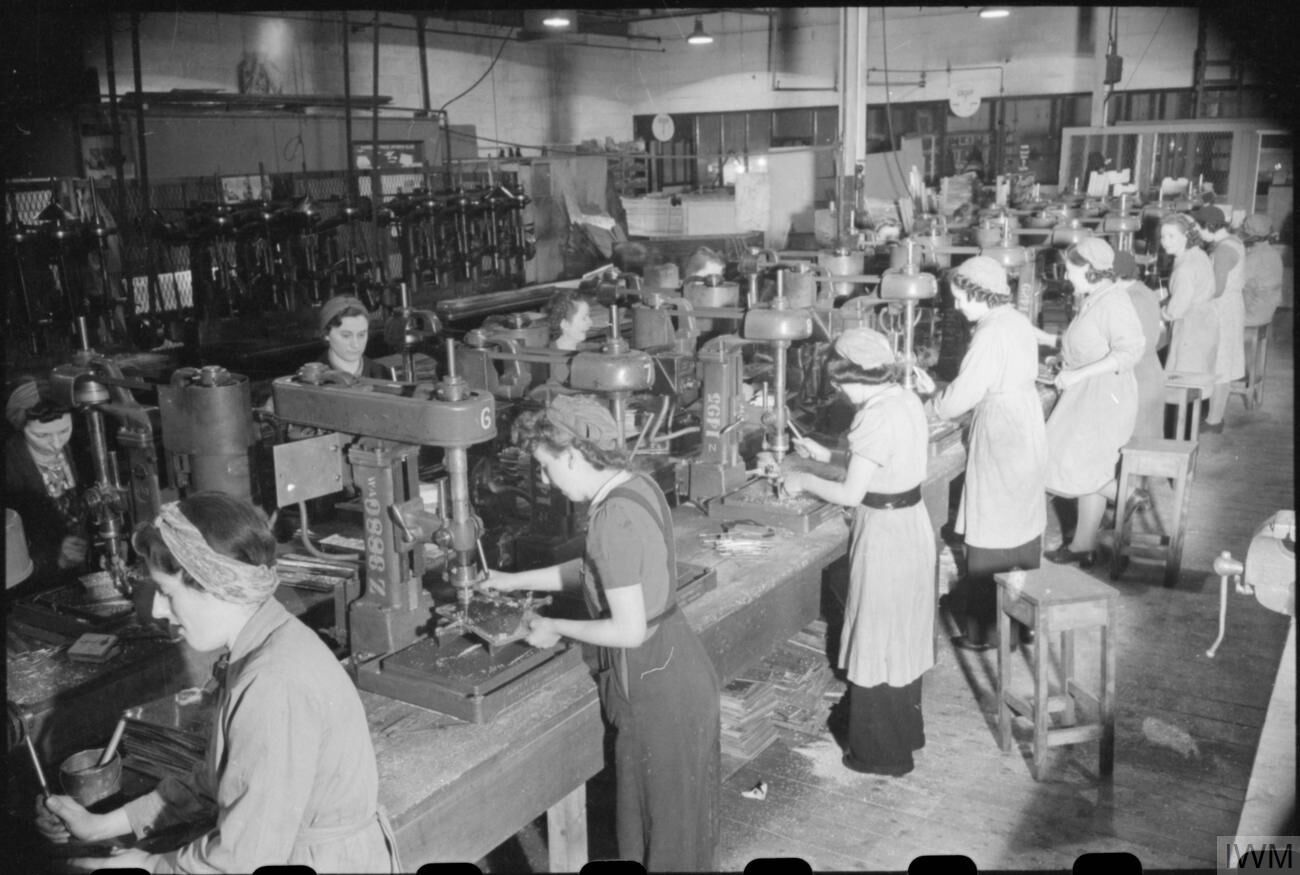
Women at work in the machine shop of the Handley Page aircraft factory at Cricklewood, London (1942).

A factor in Allied victory in World War II was the ability of Allied nations to successfully and efficiently mobilize their civilian industries and domestic populations in order to turn out weapons and goods necessary for waging war. By contrast, mobilization of economic resources in Nazi Germany was so inefficient that some early historians of the German economy concluded that the Nazi leadership must have had an intentional policy of favoring civilian over military production until late in the war. The British, by contrast, had already accomplished mobilization for total war by 1940, thereby increasing the output of weapons—especially heavy bombers—vastly. This view was for example presented quite early by John Kenneth Galbraith in Fortune magazine in 1945 "The simple fact is that Germany should have never lost the war ...". According to Adam Tooze this view was influenced by the post-war reports from Albert Speer and SS Wirtschaftsführer (economy leader) Hans Kehrl, which were not free from own interests. Tooze's alternative view is that Germany was extremely mobilising - already in 1939 there was a higher degree of mobilisation of women in Germany, for example, than Britain ever achieved during the whole war -, but the economy of Germany was simply not strong enough in comparison to the economies of the war opponents, especially with respect to the ever growing support coming from the USA. Slave labour and foreign labour in addition to women's labour could not change this. Hitler was early aware of this German weakness. He hoped, however, by a series of Blitzkriegs to change the situation early enough in favour of Germany. This failed due to military defeats in Russia and the ongoing support provided by the US to Britain.

During the Nazi invasion of the Soviet Union, Soviet soldiers and civilians moved their industries out of reach of the advancing Germans (sometimes disassembling and reassembling entire factories) and began turning out vast numbers of T-34 tanks, Il-2 attack aircraft, and other weapons.

== See also ==
- Aerial bombing of cities
- British home front during the First World War
- Civil defense
- Confederate States of America, for 1861-65
- History of France during World War I
- History of Germany during World War I
- Home front during World War I, covering all major countries involved
- Home front during World War II, covering numerous countries
- Union (American Civil War), for the U.S. 1861-1865
- The United Kingdom in World War I
- United States home front during World War I
- United States home front during World War II
