= Minister of Blockade =

World War I

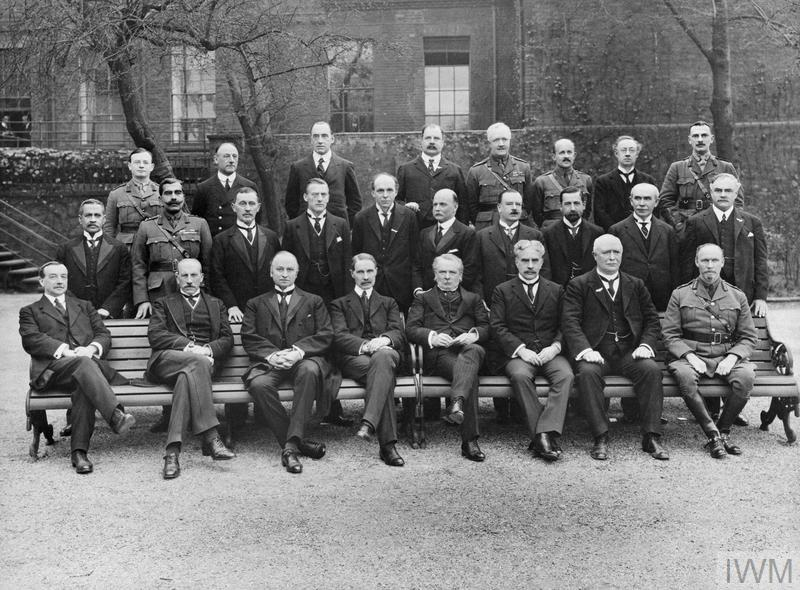
The Imperial War Cabinet in 1917. Lord Robert Cecil is in the middle of the picture, 2nd row, fifth man from the left.

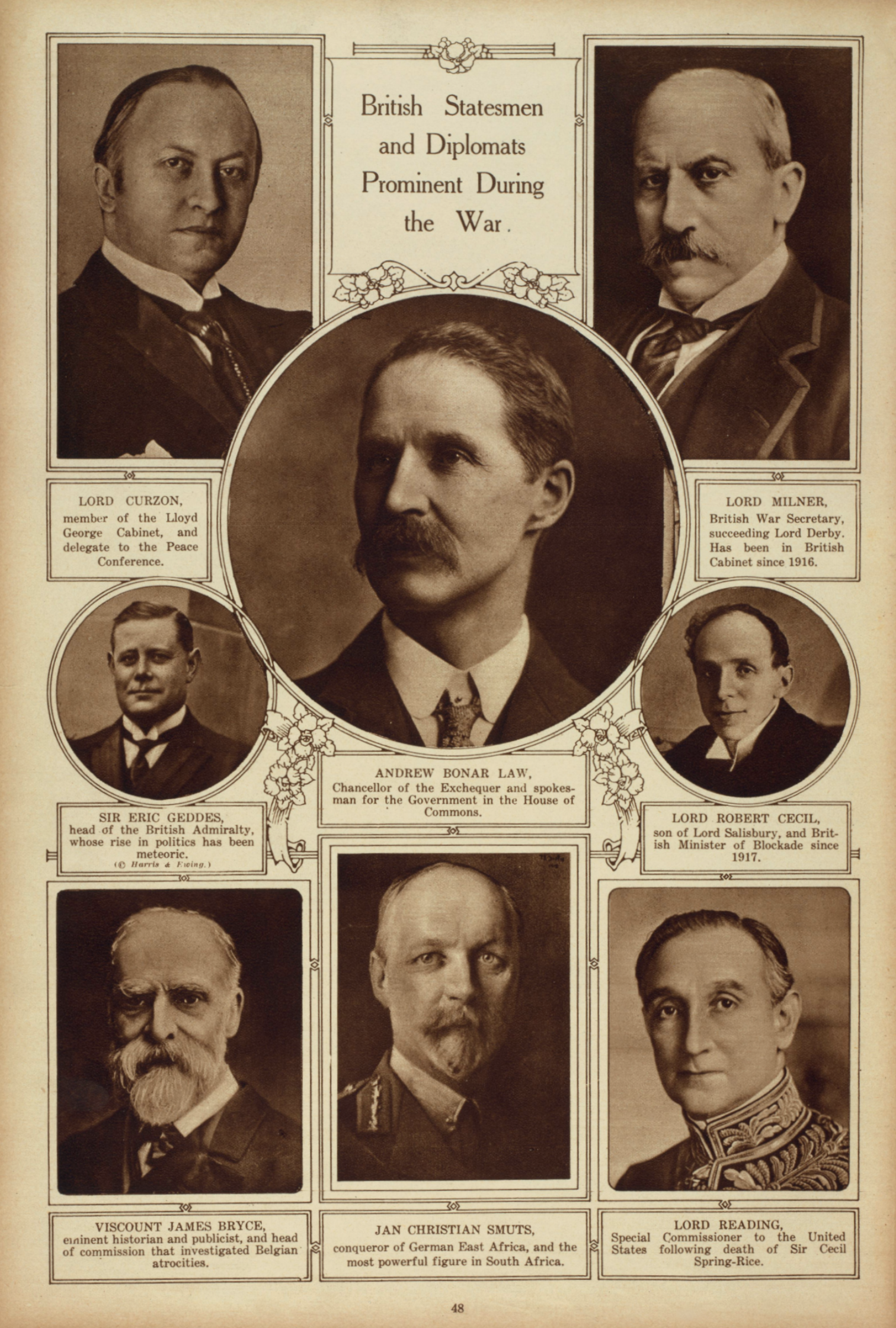
Minister of Blockade Lord Robert Cecil, middle, right

The onset of the 20th century saw England as the world's foremost naval and colonial power, supported by a 100,000-man army designed to fight small wars in its outlying colonies. Since the Napoleonic Wars nearly a century earlier, Britain and Europe had enjoyed relative peace and tranquility. The onset of World War I caught the British Empire by surprise. As it increased the size of its army through conscription, one of its first tasks was to impose a complete naval blockade against Germany. It was not popular in the United States. However, it was very important to England.

The position of Minister of Blockade grew from the merger of Britain's Eastern and Western Departments of the Foreign Office in August 1914 to form a new War Department. The War Department's mission was to prepare England for a continental war. One of its earliest creations was the Contraband Department, which in February 1916 was upgraded (transferred from the military to the government) and renamed the Ministry of Blockade. The Ministry of Blockade was responsible for maintaining both a land and sea blockade against Germany.

== Lord Robert Cecil ==
The Minister of Blockade was a position headed by Lord Robert Cecil from 1916 to 1918 to enforce the economic blockade against Germany. Cecil, undersecretary at the Foreign Office, assumed responsibility for the Ministry of Blockade, and was its sole leader during its two years of existence. The trade embargo is estimated to have cost Germany 500,000 civilian lives, and it was one of the reasons why Germany sued for peace in 1918. In a war that took terrible battlefield casualties on the Western Front, the Blockade was one of the few bright spots England could point to before 1918.

Prior to The Great War, the British had occasional discussions about a blockade against Germany in the event of conflict. However, it was not until 23 February 1916, 18 months after World War I started, that Prime Minister H. H. Asquith created a Ministry of Blockade to unite all of England's embargo efforts against Germany. The Blockade was greatly helped by Room 40 and the capture of German code books in 1914. To enforce the blockade, the shipping companies of neutral countries were pressured into declaring their goods, and ships with cargo bound for Germany were seized. Germany, which provided most of her raw materials internally, but imported much of her food, was forced to implement a food rationing program, but the problem grew progressively worse.

It was Cecil's idea for the Allies to acquire seized Dutch shipping to boost the transport of American reinforcements to France during the critical months of 1918, when the war could have gone either way, which helped aid in the capitulation of Germany.

== Greece ==
In June 1916, the British orchestrated a pacific blockade against Greece, due to that country's pro-German leanings. It was rescinded a year later with the replacement of King Constantine by his son, Alexander.

== Versailles ==
The issue of a blockade, Freedom of the Seas, and belligerent rights became important after President Wilson announced his 14 Points on January 8, 1918. The announcement was made unilaterally, without informing the allies, and Prime Minister Lloyd George could not agree to point number two, "Absolute Freedom of Navigation" of the seas for all countries, as the blockade of Germany violated this point. Following the allied victory over Germany, the 14 Points became less relevant, being substituted by The Treaty of Versailles in June 1919. As the two sides were at loggerheads over the matter, the US dropped the issue for Great Britain to sign the peace treaty.

== Present day ==
Although the United States enforced a temporary blockade against Cuba in 1962, it was legally called a "quarantine" because it only targeted offensive nuclear missiles. It continues to enforce a solitary economic blockade (with secondary sanctions against third-party countries as an incentive for them to comply). Today the naval blockade of a country is regulated by the Geneva Conventions to prevent the starvation of civilians, to prevent the collective punishment against a population for the actions of their government, and to allow for humanitarian aid (Additional Protocol I, Article 54, & the Fourth Geneva Convention, Article 23).

== See also ==
- List of historical blockades
- Occupation of Czechoslovakia (1938–1945)#The economic crisis in Germany
