= Timeline of the United Kingdom home front during the First World War =

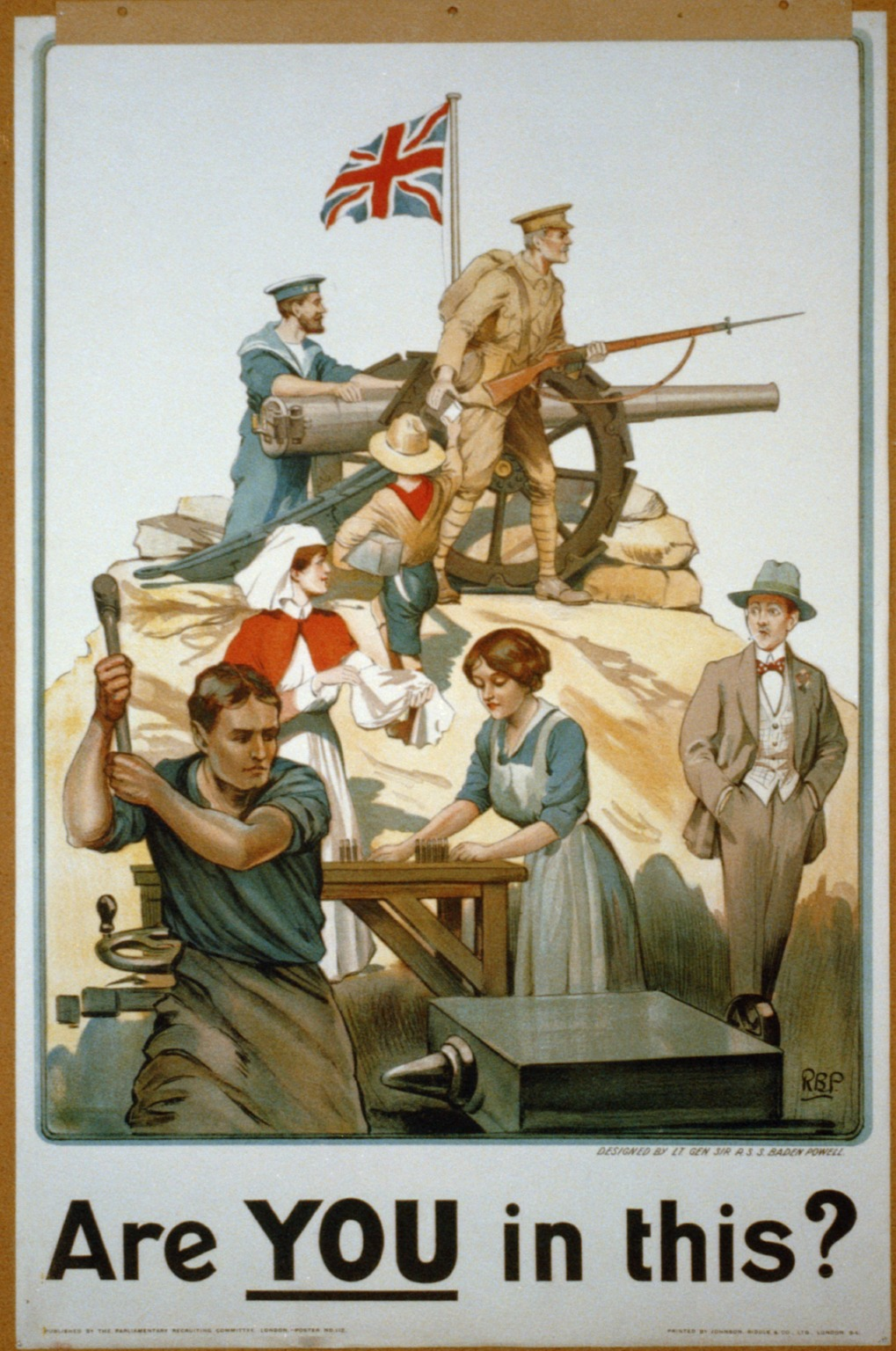
A 1917 poster designed by Robert Baden-Powell encouraging civilian participation in the war effort.

This is a timeline of the British home front during the First World War from 1914 to 1918. This conflict was the first modern example of total war in the United Kingdom; innovations included the mobilisation of the workforce, including many women, for munitions production, conscription and rationing. Civilians were subjected to naval bombardments, strategic bombing and food shortages caused by a submarine blockade.

== 1914 ==
- 28 June: Assassination of Archduke Franz Ferdinand of Austria, heir to the Austro-Hungarian throne, who was killed in Sarajevo along with his wife Duchess Sophie by Bosnian Serb Gavrilo Princip.

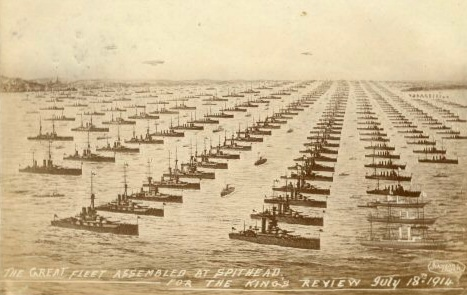
An artist's impression of the Fleet Review on 18 July 1914.

- 27 July: Winston Churchill orders a "Test Mobilisation" for the Royal Navy's Home Fleet, which was at Portland Harbour following a Fleet Review by King George V
- 28 July: Austria-Hungary declares war on Serbia. Russia mobilizes.
- 29 July: The Home Fleet is ordered to its wartime anchorage at Scapa Flow in the Orkney Islands.
- 1 August: Germany declares war on Russia.
- 2 August: British cabinet decides on war.
  - Germany invades Luxembourg.
- 3 August: Germany declares war on France. Belgium denies permission for German forces to pass through to the French border.
  - Foreign Secretary Sir Edward Grey makes a speech to the House of Commons, asking Parliament to approve the use of armed force should the German Navy attack the coasts of France, or if Germany violates Belgian neutrality.

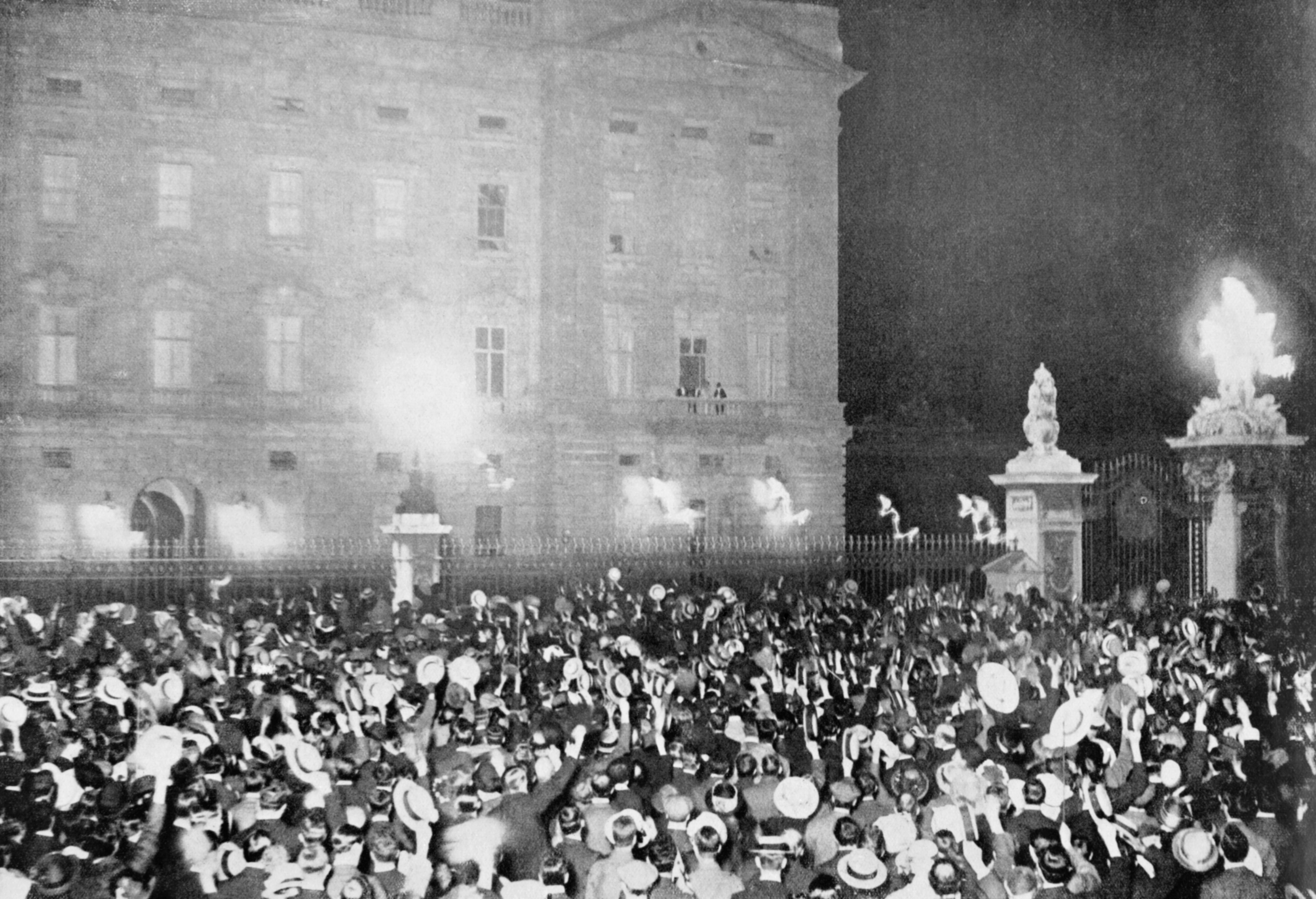
Crowds outside Buckingham Palace cheer King George, Queen Mary and the Prince of Wales (who can just be seen on the balcony) following the Declaration of War on 4 August 1914.

- 4 August: Germany invades Belgium to outflank the French army.
  - British Government protests the violation of Belgian neutrality, guaranteed by the Treaty of London; German Chancellor replies that the treaty is just a chiffon de papier (a scrap of paper).
  - The United Kingdom declares war on Germany.
  - British mobilisation: The Army and Navy Reserves are "called out" and the Territorial Force is "embodied" by Royal Proclamation.
- 5 August: The Aliens Registration Act 1914 was introduced, compelling German immigrants in the United Kingdom to register with the police and making provision for the deportation or internment of those deemed to be a particular risk.

A poster supporting Lord Kitchener's "call to arms", August 1914.

- "Your King and Country need you: a call to arms" is published by Lord Kitchener, the new Secretary of State for War, calling for 100,000 men to enlist in the army. This figure is achieved within two weeks allowing six new divisions to be formed from these volunteers, to be called Kitchener's Army. From December 1914, battalions can be recruited from a specific locality, known as "Pals battalions". By March 1915, a total of 41 new divisions have been raised.
- 6 August: Currency and Bank Notes Act 1914 authorises the issue of paper £1 and 10 shilling notes.
- 7 August: The British Expeditionary Force arrives in France.
- 8 August: The Defence of the Realm Act 1914 (widely known as "DORA") is passed, imposing, censorship and security controls on the civil population.
- 12 August: The United Kingdom declares war on Austria-Hungary.
- 16 August: The British Government announces an amnesty for Suffragettes, following the suspension of militant action by Women's Social and Political Union and other groups.
- September: German businesses in Britain are shutting down, for example the Münchener Löwenbräu London Depot.
- November: First "dilution" agreement between the Engineering Employers Federation and trades unions, allowing unskilled workers (including women) to take on some of the roles usually reserved for skilled workers.
- 19 November: The Central Association of Volunteer Training Corps is recognised by the War Office, legitimising the many town guards and local defence companies that have been formed illegally around the country.
- December: Registration of Belgian refugees in Britain begins. More than 200,000 civilians had arrived since August; they were hosted by communities across the country, managed by more than 2,500 local Belgian refugee committees.
- 3 December: The No Conscription Fellowship is formed.
- 16 December: A squadron of German battlecruisers and other warships conduct a raid on Scarborough, Hartlepool and Whitby, resulting in 137 deaths and 592 casualties, most of whom are civilians.

== 1915 ==
- 9 January: Kaiser Wilhelm II authorises airship raids on the United Kingdom, excluding London.
- 19 January: The first air raid over Britain. Two German Navy Zeppelin airships drop bombs and incendiaries over Great Yarmouth and King's Lynn in Norfolk; four civilians are killed and sixteen injured.

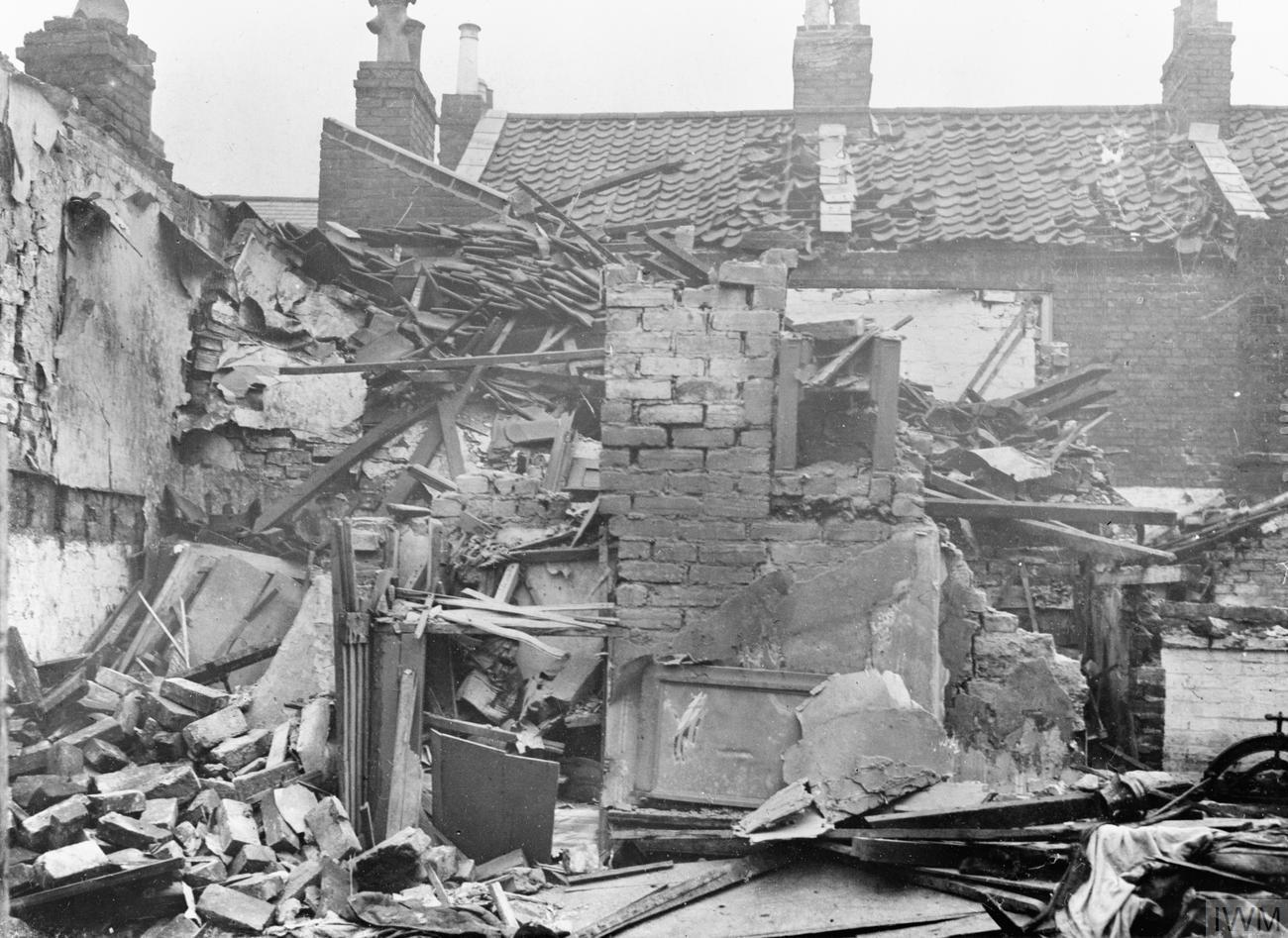
Damage to houses in King's Lynn caused by a Zeppelin airship raid in 1915.

- 12 February: The Kaiser authorises airship raids on the London Docks.
- 18 February: The Kaiser authorises an unrestricted submarine blockade of the United Kingdom.
- 16 March: Defence of the Realm (Amendment) (No 2) Act allows the government to force engineering firms to accept contracts for war related work.
- 27 March: Commander-in-Chief of the BEF, Sir John French gave an interview to The Times highlighting the shortage of artillery ammunition at the front. This scandal was to become known the Shell Crisis.
- 16 April: A single German Albatros B.II aircraft bombs Sittingbourne and Faversham in Kent; the first raid by an aeroplane. There are no casualties.

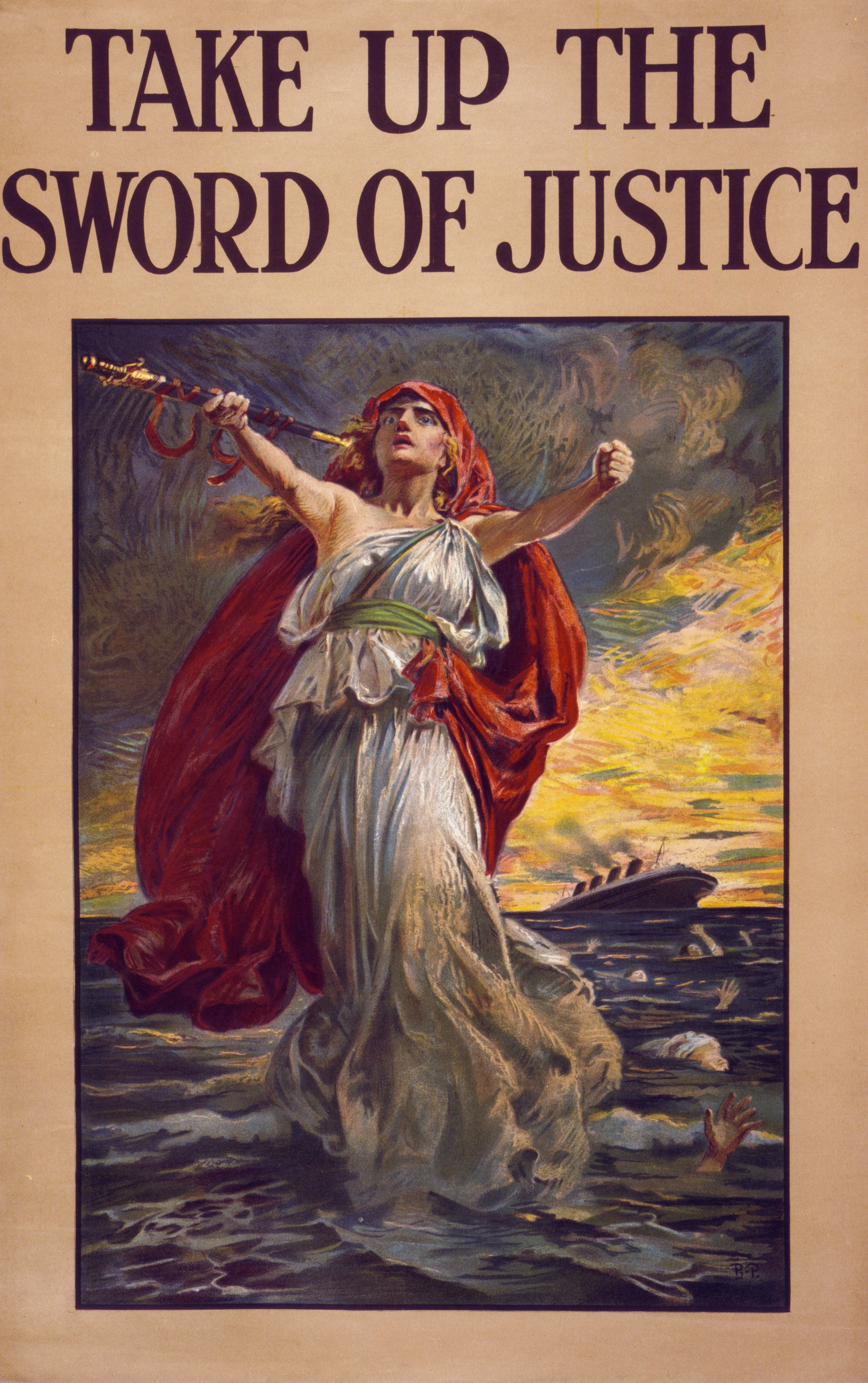
A poster published by the Parliamentary Recruiting Committee reflecting public anger at the sinking of RMS Lusitania on 7 May 1915. This was also the cause of rioting directed against German immigrants in several British cities.

- 7 May: The sinking of the British ocean liner RMS Lusitania by a U-boat, with the loss of 1,198 passengers and crew, provokes anti-German riots in London and other cities. Mobs target shops and businesses owned by Germans or those with German surnames.
- 26 May: Prime Minister H. H. Asquith announces his new ministry, a coalition government with the Conservative Party. David Lloyd George was made Minister of Munitions, relieving Kitchener of that aspect of his role. Churchill is relieved of control of the Admiralty following the failure of the Gallipoli Campaign.
- 31 May: First air raid on London; an Army Zeppelin dropped bombs over north and east London killing seven civilians.
- July: Women's War Agricultural Committees established to encourage more women to work on the land.
- 2 July: The Munitions of War Act 1915 becomes law, regulating the wages, hours and conditions of munitions workers. It becomes an offence for a worker to leave employment at a "Controlled Establishment" without the consent of the employer.
- 15 July: National Registration Act 1915 was passed, requiring all men and women between the ages of 15 and 65 to register their address.

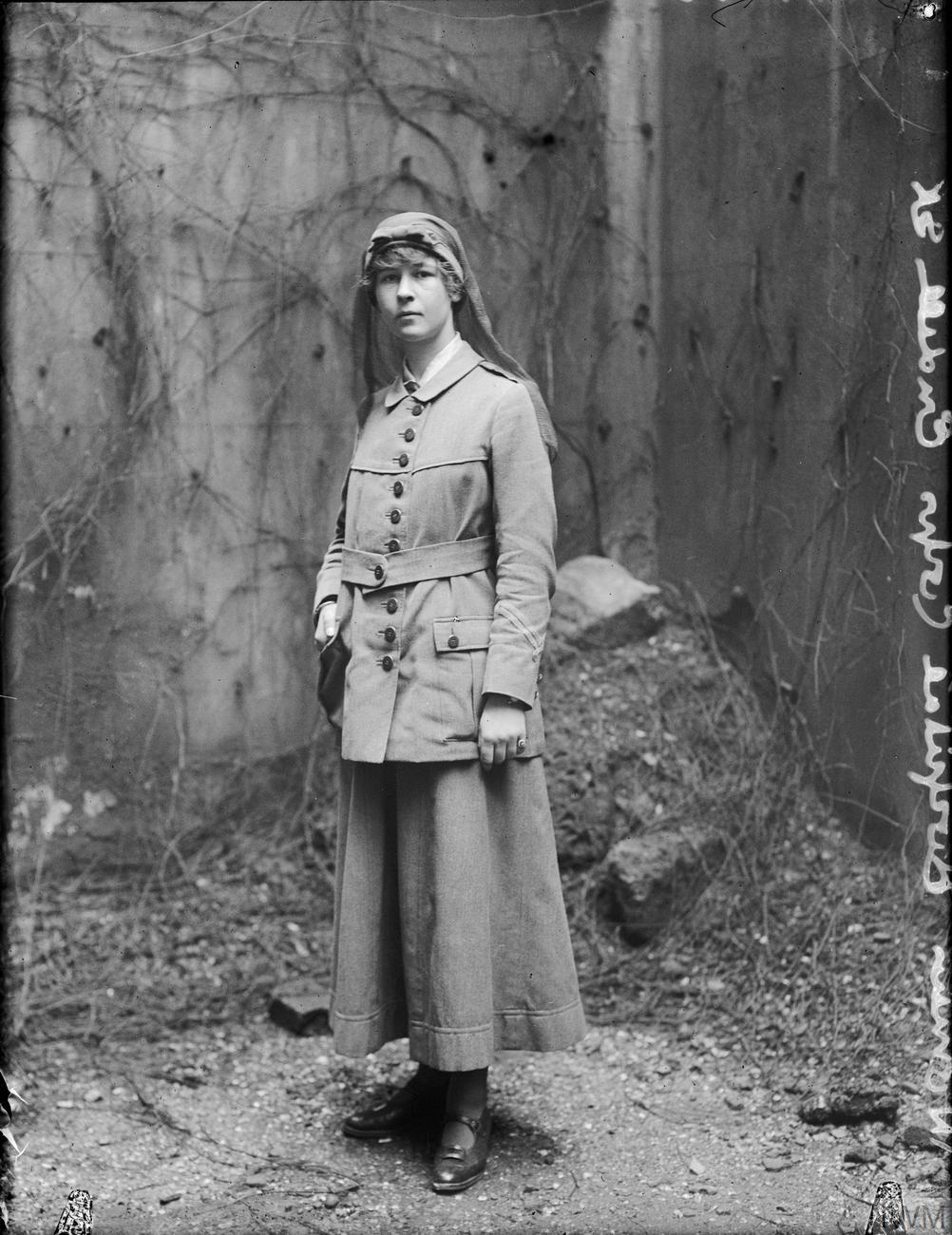
A member of the Women's Hospital Corps in London, 1915.

- 17 July: Emmeline Pankhurst leads a "Women's Right to Serve" demonstration in Trafalgar Square, London.
- 3 September: Lieutenant Leefe Robinson flying a BE2 biplane, shoots down the first German airship over British soil. The Schütte-Lanz SL 11, which had been bombing north London and St Albans, crashed in flames at Cuffley in Hertfordshire. For this action Lieutenant Robinson was awarded the Victoria Cross.
- 16 October: Start enrolment for the Derby Scheme which encouraged men of military eligibility to voluntarily attest their willingness to join the armed forces at a later date. After attesting, men were placed on the Class B army reserve list until required. In return, they received a day's army pay and a khaki brassard which they could wear with their civilian clothes.
- 15 December: Finish of the Derby Scheme (originally planned for 30 November); although 2,950,514 men had attested, enlisted or tried to enlist during the scheme, a further 2,060,927 eligible men had refused to do so, increasing pressure for conscription.

== 1916 ==
- 2 March: Military Service Act 1916 comes into force, introducing compulsory conscription in Great Britain but not Ireland. Men from 18 to 41 years old were liable to be called up for service in the army unless they were married, widowed with children, serving in the Royal Navy, a minister of religion, or working in one of a number of reserved occupations. Local Military Service Tribunals could grant exemption from service, usually conditional or temporary.
- 2 April: An explosion at a munitions factory in Faversham kills 115 workers.
- 24–29 April: Easter Uprising by Irish Nationalists in Dublin.
- 21 May: Daylight saving introduced in Britain, to save fuel for lighting and encourage longer working hours.
- 5 June: Lord Kitchener dies when the cruiser, HMS Hampshire, which is carrying him to Russia, hits a mine and sinks off the coast off the coast of Scotland. Lloyd George succeeds him as Secretary of State for War.
- 10 August: London première of The Battle of the Somme, giving audiences their first realistic impression of a modern battlefield. It is estimated that 20 million Britons had seen the film during the first six weeks of its release.
- 5 December: Lloyd George resigns as Minister of War, after Asquith fails to agree Lloyd George's plan for a new "War Council", prompting Asquith's resignation as Prime Minister the next day.

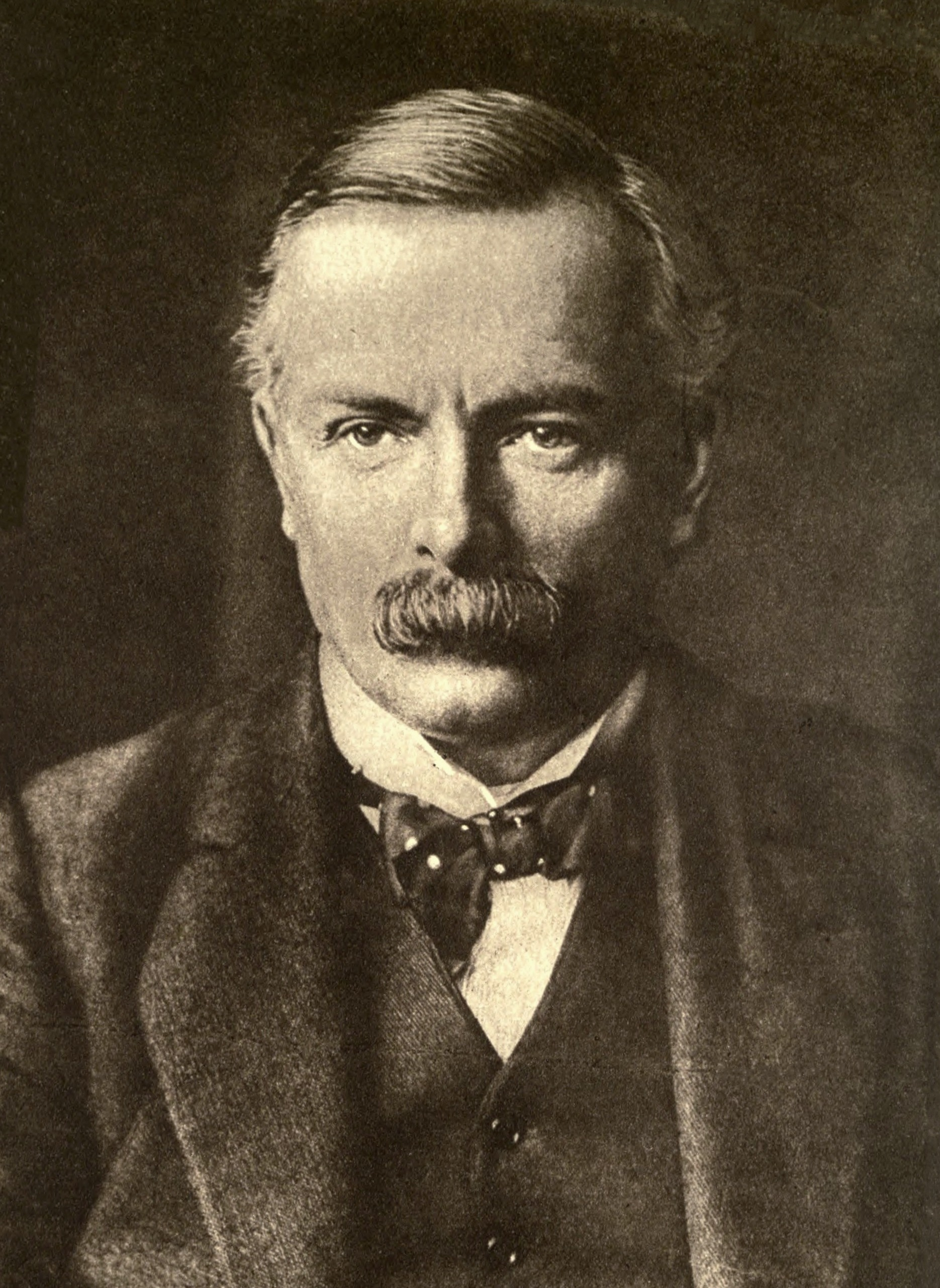
David Lloyd George became prime minister on 7 December 1916.

- 7 December: David Lloyd George forms a new coalition government.
- 22 December: The first Ministry of Food was established under a food controller who, under the New Ministries and Secretaries Act 1916, was empowered to regulate the supply and consumption of food and take steps for encouraging food production. The Ministry was dissolved on 31 March 1921.

== 1917 ==
- 19 January: An explosion at a munitions factory in Slivertown, West Ham, kills 73 people.
- 2 February: Corn Production Act 1917 guarantees minimum prices for staple food crops and lays down minimum wages for agricultural workers. It also initiates a "compulsory plough policy" which can force landowners to cultivate their land.

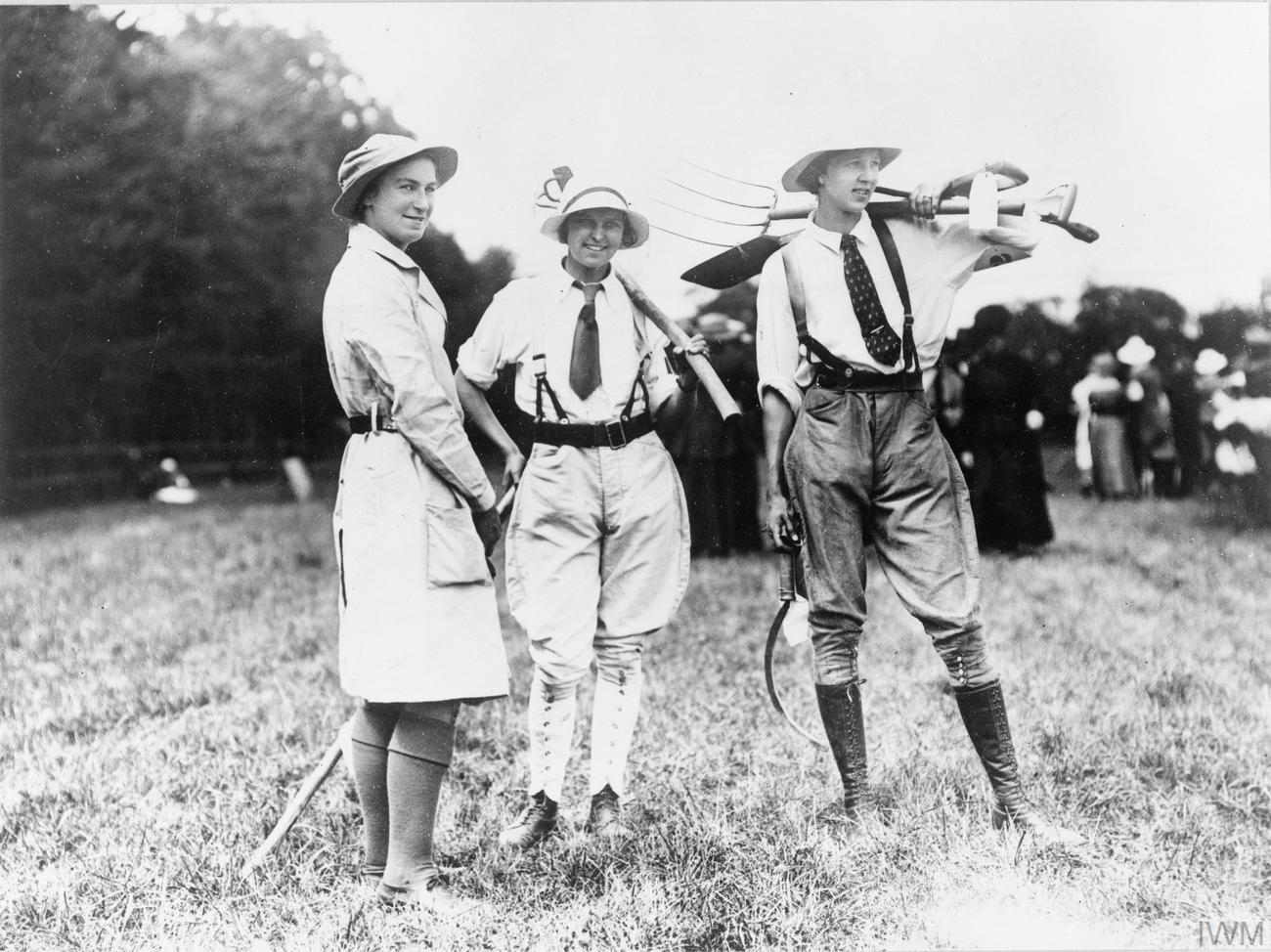
Women's Land Army farm workers in Hertfordshire, 1917.

- March: A shortage of wheat leads to the introduction of "Government bread", which contains a proportion of flour made from oats, barley, rye or even potatoes.
  - Women's Land Army and Women's Forestry Corps are established.
- 28 March: Ministry of National Service is established.
- 21 May: The first National Kitchen is opened by Queen Mary in Westminster Bridge Road, London, providing cheap meals for those affected by food shortages.

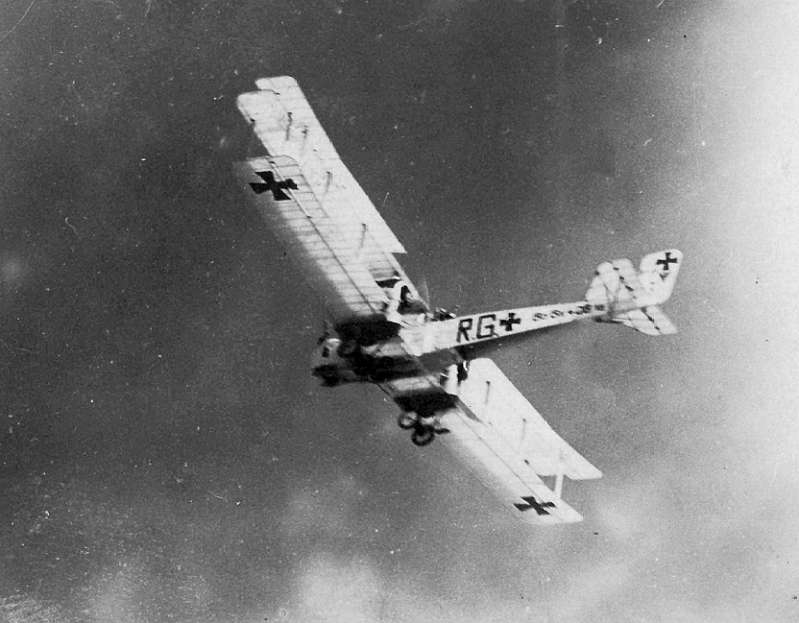
A German Gotha G.IV bomber in flight, 1917.

- 25 May: First raid on England by German Gotha heavy bomber aircraft at Folkestone in Kent.
- 29 May: A royal proclamation issued by King George V encourages a voluntary reduction in bread consumption.
- 13 June: First attack on London by German heavy bombers; 104 civilians were killed, including 18 children at an Upper North Street School in Poplar.
- July: The Metropolitan Police introduce their first air raid warning system, which consists of police officers detonating maroons (a type of loud firework) and the "all clear" to be sounded by Boy Scout buglers.
- 17 July: A royal proclamation issued by George V declares: "Our House and Family shall be styled and known as the House and Family of Windsor", thus renouncing their German titles.

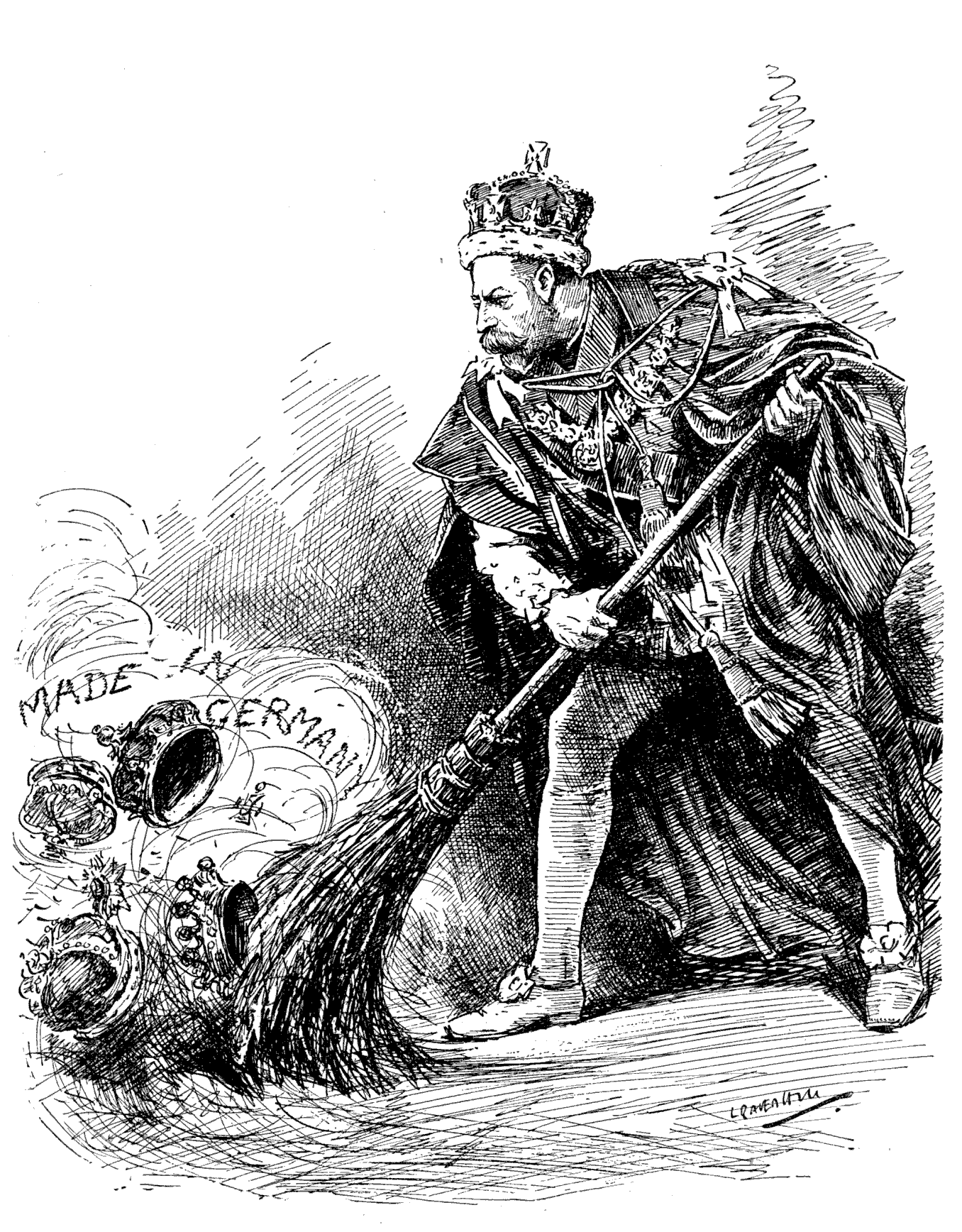
"A Good Riddance": a cartoon in Punch magazine showing King George V sweeping away his German titles in July 1917.

- 4 September: First night-time bomber raid on London.
- 2 November: The Foreign Secretary, Arthur Balfour, makes his "Declaration" of the British intention to provide "a national home for the Jewish people" in Palestine, which is being captured from the Ottoman Empire.
- 17 December: Residents of Pontypool are issued with ration cards for sugar, tea, butter and margarine.
- 29 November: Former cabinet minister, Henry Petty-Fitzmaurice, 5th Marquess of Lansdowne, writes a letter to the Daily Telegraph appealing for a peaceful settlement to the war which would become known as the "Lansdowne letter".
- 31 December: National sugar rationing is introduced.

== 1918 ==
- January: Women's Royal Naval Service is established.
- 1 January: Food rationing on certain items introduced in Birmingham, soon followed by other major towns and cities.
- 5 January: Lloyd George makes his War Aims speech to trades union leaders, setting out the government's terms for peace with the Central Powers.
- 16 February: First 1,000 kilogram (2,205 pound) bomb is dropped on London during the twelfth night bomber raid.
- 25 February: Start of rationing of meat and fats in London and the Home Counties.
- 1 April: Women's Royal Air Force is established.
- 18 April: Military Service (No. 2) Act 1918 extends conscription up to age 50 and to residents of Ireland; although the latter is never implemented because of the Conscription Crisis.

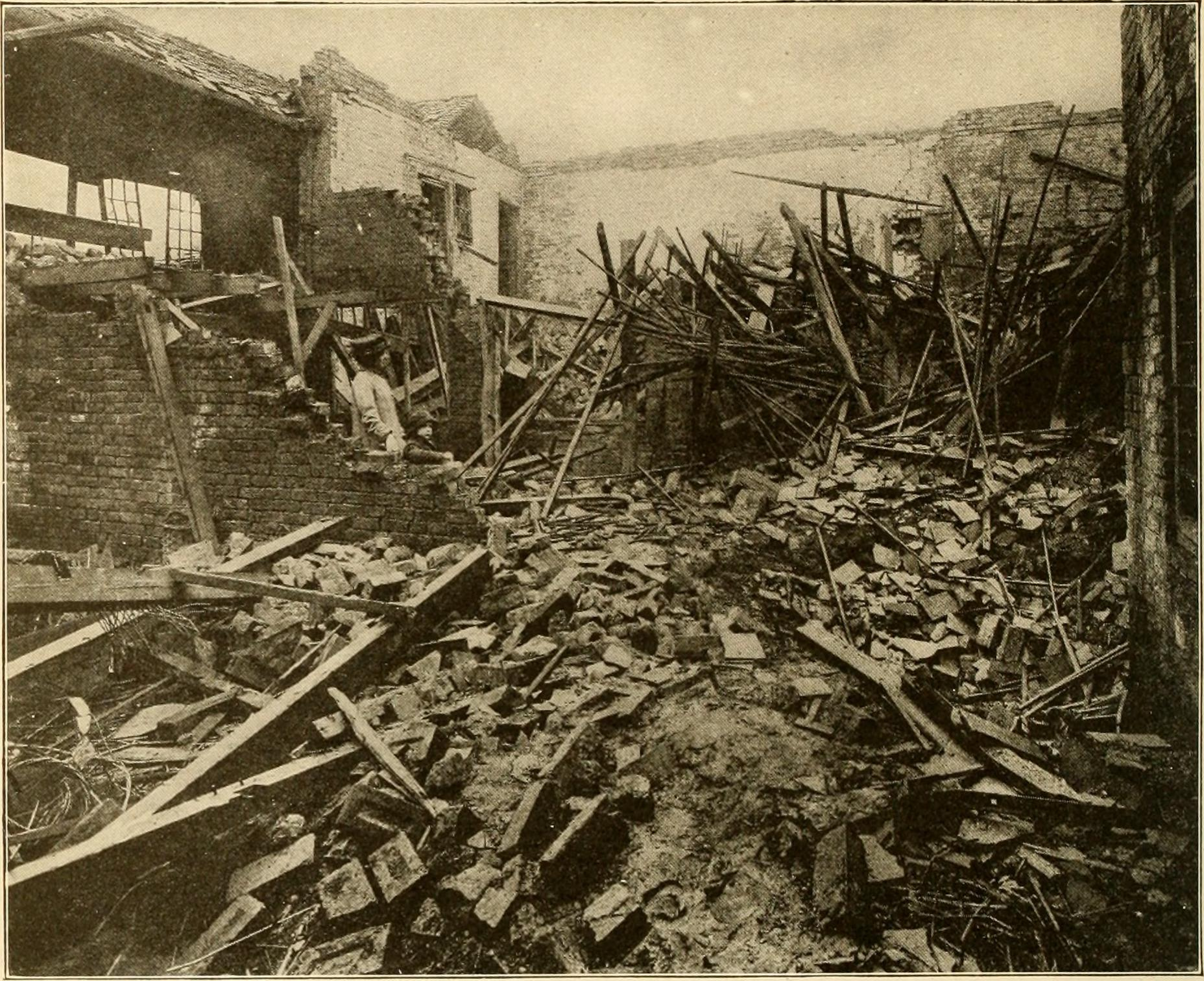
A mother and son view the remains of their home after an air raid in London.

- 19 May: The "Whitsun Raid" the largest and last of 17 bomber aeroplane raids on London; 49 civilians are killed in London and Essex. The total number of civilian casualties from air raids since 1915 within London's Metropolitan Police District was 668 killed and 1,938 injured.
- 10 June: Representation of the People Act 1918 gives the vote to women over 30.
- 31 August: Metropolitan Police go on strike.
- 28 October: Peak mortality of the Spanish flu pandemic in the UK.
- 11 November: Lloyd George announces that an armistice has been signed and that hostilities will cease at 11 am. Church bells are rung and the Royal Family appear on the balcony of Buckingham Palace before cheering crowds.

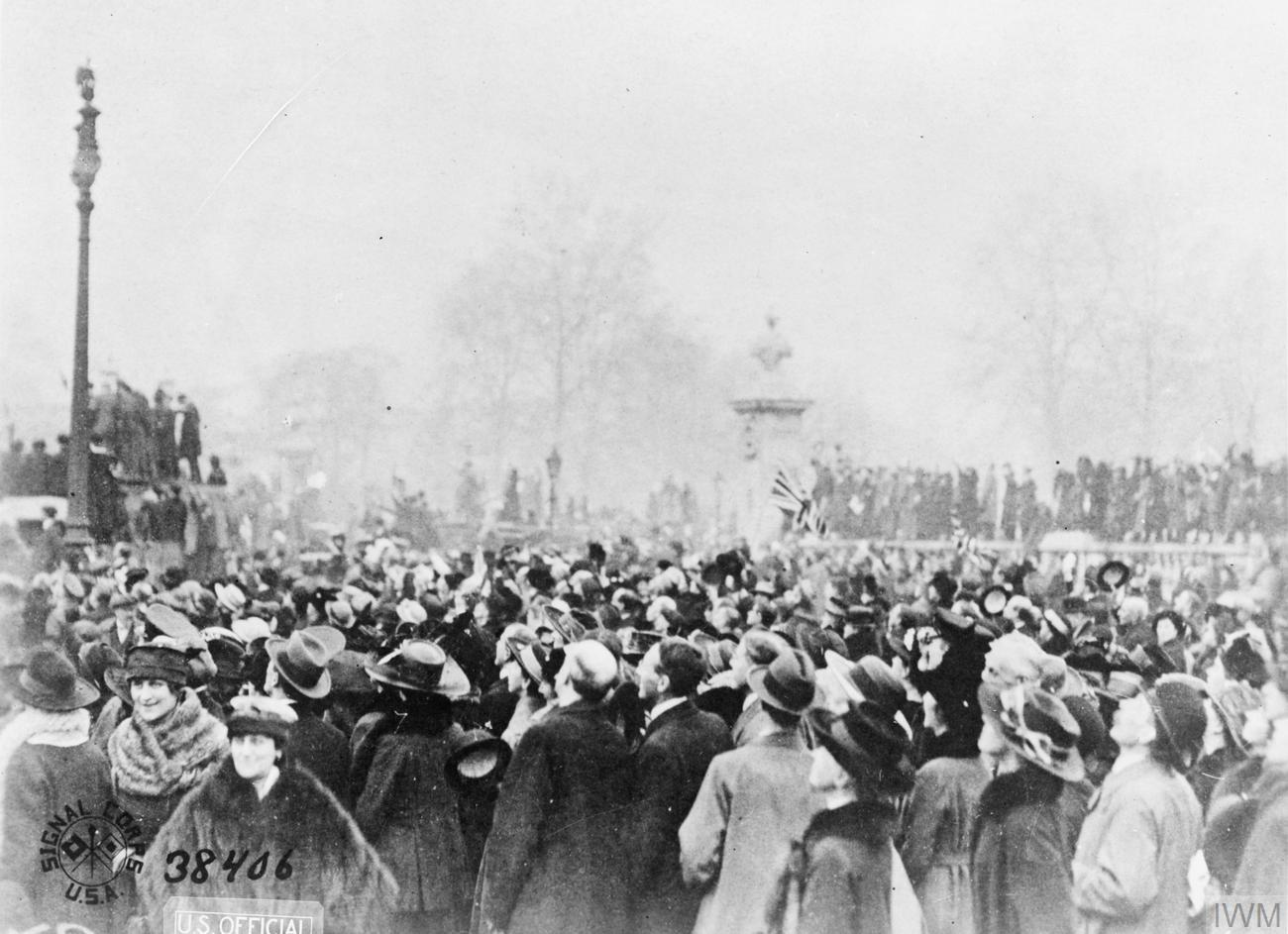
Crowds outside Buckingham Palace on Armistice Day, 11 November 1918.
