= List of blockades =

The list of blockades informs about blockades that were carried out either on land, or in the maritime and air spaces in the effort to defeat opponents through denial of supply, usually to cause military exhaustion and starvation as an economic blockade in addition to restricting movement of enemy troops.

== Ancient era ==
	Opponents	Blockader	Conflict	Details
458–457 BCE	Aegina (Saronic Gulf)	Athens	First Peloponnesian War	
431–404 BCE	Athens	Sparta	Peloponnesian War	Spartan forces surrounded Athens on land. Athens withstood the landward attack, and subsisted on food imported by ship. In the Battle of Aegospotami, the Spartan navy destroyed the Athenian navy and implemented a sea blockade, forcing Athens to surrender.
42–36 BCE	Roman Italy	Supporters of Sextus Pompey	Bellum Siculum	Sextus Pompey blockades the Grain supply to Rome.
31 BCE	Supporters of Mark Antony Ptolemaic Egypt	Supporters of Octavian	War of the Second Triumvirate (Battle of Actium)	Octavian blockaded Mark Antony's ships in the Gulf of Actium.

== Medieval era ==
	Blockaded Territory	Blockader	Conflict	Details
1068–1071	Byzantine Empire	Robert Guiscard	Norman conquest of southern Italy	Robert Guiscard's Norman forces blockaded Byzantine cities in southern Italy, most notably in the siege of Bari.
1084	Norman-occupied Corfu	Byzantine Empire Venice	Byzantine-Norman Wars	After the Normans occupied Corfu, Emperor Alexios I Komnenos blockaded the island with Venetian naval support gained in exchange for commercial privileges.
1102	Jerusalem	Fatimid Caliphate	Crusades	
1104–1108	Tripoli	Jerusalem Antioch Edessa Toulouse Cerdanya Genoa	Siege of Tripoli	Blockade of the Lebanese coast leading by the Outremer and Genoa leading to the establishment of the County of Tripoli
1110	Sidon	Norway	Norwegian Crusade	Main article: Siege of Sidon
1337	Cadzand, Flanders	England	Hundred Years' War	Main article: Battle of Cadzand
1379–1380	Venice	Genoa	War of Chioggia	
1394–1402	Constantinople, Byzantine Empire	Ottoman Empire	Byzantine–Ottoman wars	Ottoman blockade of Constantinople

== Early-modern era ==
Duration of Blockade	Blockaded Territory	Blockader	Conflict	Details
1585–1792	Antwerp, Spanish Netherlands (later Austrian Netherlands)	Dutch Republic	Aftermath of Eighty Years' War	
1601	Banten	Portuguese Empire	Dutch–Portuguese War	
1639–1646	Spanish Netherlands	Dutch Republic	Thirty Years' War	
1653	Dutch Republic	England	First Anglo-Dutch War	
1656–1657	Venice	Ottoman Empire (Dardanelles)	Cretan War	
1726–1728	(Spain) Portobelo, Province of Tierra Firme	Great Britain	Anglo-Spanish War (1727–1729)	Main article: Blockade of Porto Bello
1775–1778	Thirteen Colonies (United States from 1776 onwards)	Great Britain	American Revolutionary War	The British Empire declared the American colonies to be in a state of rebellion after the First Continental Congress and refused to recognize their Declaration of Independence. The blockade ended with the Treaty of Paris recognizing U.S. independence and ending the war.
1788–1790	Sweden	Russia	Second Russo-Swedish War	
1793–1797	France	Great Britain	War of the First Coalition	Main articles: Naval campaigns, operations and battles of the French Revolutionary Wars and Atlantic campaign of May 1794
1794	Dutch East Indies British East India Company	France	War of the First Coalition	Main article: Sunda Strait campaign of January 1794
1797	Spain	Great Britain	Anglo-Spanish War	Main article: Assault on Cádiz (1797)
1798–1802	France	Great Britain Portugal Russia Ottoman Empire Naples Order of St. John	War of the Second Coalition	
1798–1800	French-occupied Egypt	Great Britain Portugal Russia Ottoman Empire Naples Order of St. John	War of the Second Coalition	Main article: Mediterranean campaign of 1798
1798–1800	French-occupied Malta	Great Britain Portugal Russia Ottoman Empire Naples Order of St. John	War of the Second Coalition	Main article: Siege of Malta (1798–1800)
1801	Denmark-Norway	Great Britain	War of the Second Coalition	Main article: Battle of Copenhagen (1801)
1806–1814	France	United Kingdom	Napoleonic Wars	Main article: Orders in Council (1807)
1806–1814	United Kingdom	France and its client states	Napoleonic Wars	Main article: Continental System
1808–1809	Russia	Sweden	Finnish War	
1808–1813	Denmark-Norway	United Kingdom Sweden	Dano-Swedish War of 1808–09 Gunboat War	
1812–1815	United States	United Kingdom	War of 1812	
1807–1866	Africa	United Kingdom United States (after 1841)	Blockade of Africa	The blockade suppressed the Atlantic slave trade.
1825–1828	United Provinces	Empire of Brazil	Cisplatine War	
1827–1830	Regency of Algiers	France	French blockade of Algiers	The blockade failed to suppress Algerian corsair activities or restrict Algerian trade, and was consequently superseded by the French invasion of Algiers in 1830.

== Modern era ==
Duration of Blockade	Blockaded Territory	Blockader	Conflict	Details
1838–1840	Rio de la Plata, Argentine Confederation	France	War of the Confederation	Main article: French blockade of the Río de la Plata
1840	Kingdom of the Two Sicilies	United Kingdom	Sulphur Crisis	
1845–1850	Rio de la Plata, Argentine Confederation	France United Kingdom	Uruguayan Civil War	Main article: Anglo-French blockade of the Río de la Plata
1846–1848	Mexico	United States	Mexican-American War	Main article: Blockade of Veracruz
1848–1851	Germany	Denmark	First Schleswig War	
1854–1856	Russia	United Kingdom France Ottoman Empire	Crimean War	
1861–1865	Confederate States	United States	American Civil War	Main articles: Union blockade and Anaconda Plan
1854–1856	Chile	Spain	Chincha Islands War	
1873–1881	Aceh Sultanate	Netherlands	Aceh War	
1886	Greece	Great Powers (excluding France)	Eastern Rumelia Crisis	
1894–1895	China	Japan	First Sino-Japanese War	
1897	Constantinople, Ottoman Empire	Great Powers		
1898	Spanish Cuba San Juan, Spanish Puerto Rico	United States	Spanish-American War	
1902–1903	Venezuela	United Kingdom Germany Italy	Venezuelan crisis of 1902–1903	
1908	Venezuela	Netherlands	Dutch–Venezuelan crisis of 1908	
1914–1919	Germany Austria-Hungary Bulgaria	British Empire France Italy United States	World War I and its aftermath	Main articles: Blockade of Germany (1914–1919), Dover Barrage, and Otranto Barrage Included mainly Germany but also the entire Central Powers. The Allied blockade of Germany continued for a year after the Armistice until it signed the Treaty of Versailles.
1915–1918	Ottoman Empire	British Empire France Italy United States	Middle Eastern theatre of World War I	Main articles: Blockade of the Eastern Mediterranean and Great Famine of Mount Lebanon
1915–1918	Lebanon	Ottoman Empire	Middle Eastern theatre of World War I	Main articles: Blockade of the Eastern Mediterranean and Great Famine of Mount Lebanon
1936	Spanish Morocco	Spain	Spanish Civil War	See also: Spanish coup of July 1936 The Spanish Republican Navy blockaded the Strait of Gibraltar to hamper the transport of Francisco Franco's Army of Africa to Peninsular Spain
1936–1939	Republican-controlled Spain	Nationalist faction	Spanish Civil War	The Nationalists blockaded northern and southeastern Spain
1937–1945	China	Japan	Second Sino-Japanese War	
1939–1945	Nazi Germany and its occupied territories Fascist Italy (after 1940) Vichy France and its colonies (after 1940)	United Kingdom Canada France (until 1940) Soviet Union (after 1941) United States (after 1941)	World War II	Main article: Blockade of Germany (1939–1945) The Allied Powers carried out a blockade to prevent the Axis Powers from acquiring materials. Although the blockade was initially ineffective due to the use of neutral ports in the Soviet Union and Francoist Spain, it grew more severe when the Soviet Union and the United States entered the war in 1941 and when the Germans lost control of their occupied territories in France and Eastern Europe in 1944.
1940–1945	United Kingdom Soviet Union	Nazi Germany	World War II	Main article: Battle of the Atlantic The Nazi German Kriegsmarine attempted to block shipping to Britain and Russia through the use of U-boats.
1941–1945	Leningrad, Soviet Union	Nazi Germany	Eastern Front of World War II	See also: Siege of Leningrad
1944–1945	Japan	United States British Empire	Pacific Front of World War II	
1948	Changchun, Republic of China	Chinese Red Army	Chinese Civil War	Main article: Siege of Changchun Changchun was one of the largest cities in Manchuria and was a strategic ROC Army base in Northeast China. The fall of the city led to Communist victory in the Liaoshen campaign.
1948–1949	West Berlin	Soviet Union	Berlin Blockade	The Soviet occupation forces in Germany blockaded West Berlin at the beginning of the Cold War, but it became ineffective due to an American-led airlift.
1949–1958	Mainland China	Taiwan	Cross-Strait conflict	
1950–1953	North Korea	South Korea United States United Nations Command	Korean War	See also: Blockade of Wonsan
1956	Israel	Egypt	Suez Crisis	Egypt blockaded the Straits of Tiran before the Suez Crisis.
1962	Cuba	United States	Cuban Missile Crisis	The United States declared a "quarantine" of Cuba in reaction to the deployment of Soviet nuclear missiles.
1965–1975	North Vietnam	United States South Vietnam	Vietnam War	Main articles: Operation Market Time and Operation Game Warden
1966–1975	Rhodesia	United Kingdom	Beira Patrol	The British government, along with most of the international community, did not recognize Rhodesia's Unilateral Declaration of Independence due to its policy of no independence before majority rule.
1967	Israel	Egypt	Six-Day War	Egypt resumed its blockade of the Straits of Tiran shortly before the war. Israel responded by invading and occupying the Sinai Peninsula.
1968–1970	Biafra	Nigeria	Nigerian Civil War	Nigeria blockaded the secessionist republic of Biafra, creating an international humanitarian crisis that resulted in Biafrans receiving aid from volunteers around the world during the Biafran airlift and inspired the formation of Doctors Without Borders.
1971	East Pakistan	India	Indo-Pakistani War of 1971	
1973	Israel	Egypt	October war 1973	See also: Operation Badr (1973)
1973	Egypt	Israel	October war 1973	
1982	Falkland Islands (Occupied by Argentina making it Islas Malvinas)	United Kingdom	Falklands War	
1982–2000	Lebanon	Israel	1982 Lebanon War South Lebanon conflict	The blockade was first imposed during the 1982 Israeli invasion of Lebanon. However, it was sporadically renewed after the Israel Defense Force was forced to withdraw to the South Lebanon security belt due to its continuing conflict with Hezbollah.
1990–2003	Ba'athist Iraq	United Nations United States United Kingdom France	Gulf War Iraq disarmament crisis	Enforcement of sanctions against Iraq. The U.S. Air Force, the Royal Air Force, and the French Air Force also enforced no-fly zones in the northern and southern halves of the country.
1990	Lithuania	Soviet Union	Singing Revolution	Main article: Soviet economic blockade of Lithuania The Soviet government refused to recognize Lithuania's independence.
1992–1993	Croatia	Federal Republic of Yugoslavia	Croatian War of Independence	Yugoslavia refused to recognize Croatia's independence. The Yugoslav Navy blockaded the Adriatic coast until it was defeated by Croatian artillery in the Battle of the Dalmatian Channels.
1993–1996	Federal Republic of Yugoslavia	North Atlantic Treaty Organization United Nations Protection Force	Bosnian War	Main articles: Operation Deliberate Force, Operation Maritime Guard, and Operation Sharp Guard NATO imposed a blockade on the Federal Republic of Yugoslavia to enforce the UN sanctions on the country and enforced no-fly zones.
1996	Taiwan	Mainland China	Third Taiwan Strait Crisis	The PRC launched ballistic missiles at ROC territorial waters near the important ports of Keelung and Kaohsiung, forcing lengthy travel and shipping delays. The missile launches were believed to be intended to intimidate the Taiwanese public before the 1996 presidential election.
2001–2007		Australia		Maritime protection program to prevent arrivals of unauthorized "boat people."
2006	Lebanon	Israel	2006 Lebanon War	
2009	Mullaitivu, Sri Lanka	Sri Lanka	Sri Lankan civil war	
2011	Libya	United Nations	Libyan Civil War	The U.N. Security Council approved a no-fly zone over Libya.
2015	Nepal	India	2015 Nepal blockade	Nepal accused India, on which it is reliant for petroleum and medicine imports, of imposing a blockade.
2017–2021	Qatar	Saudi Arabia United Arab Emirates Bahrain Egypt	Qatar diplomatic crisis	Several Arab League countries accused Qatar of funding terrorism in violation of a Gulf Cooperation Council agreement. Qatar denied these accusations but Saudi Arabia, Qatar’s only land neighbor, sealed its border, imposing a “land blockade“ and shutting down all land based trade to and from Qatar. Qatar was also criticized for its close relations with Iran and the management of Al Jazeera. Qatar claims it never funded terrorist groups such as al-Qaeda and the Islamic State, and also shares a strategic alliance with the United States in the war on terror and the international intervention against ISIL. The conflict was resolved after a diplomatic agreement brokered by the United States and Kuwait.
2020–2022	Tigray, Ethiopia	Ethiopia Eritrea	Tigray war	See also: Famine in northern Ethiopia (2020–present) Martin Griffiths spoke of a "de facto blockade" against Tigray. The blockade was lifted with the Ethiopia–Tigray peace agreement.
2022–2024	Republic of Artsakh (Nagorno-Karabakh)	Azerbaijan	Nagorno-Karabakh conflict	Main article: Blockade of the Republic of Artsakh (2022–2024) Starting in December 2022, Azerbaijan launched an illegal blockade of the breakaway Republic of Artsakh in the disputed region of Nagorno-Karabakh, trapping the 120,000 residents within the region, blocking transport of food, medicine, and other supplies, and cutting off electricity and natural gas to the region. The blockade has remained in place despite calls from the International Court of Justice and the European Court of Human Rights for the blockade to be lifted.
2023–2025	Red Sea	Houthi Yemen	Middle Eastern crisis (2023–present)	Main article: Red Sea crisis The Houthis closed the Red Sea and attacked commercial vessels. The attacked ended with the Gaza peace plan. A new crisis began with their entry into the resumed during the 2026 Iran war.
2025	Southern Transitional Council	Yemen	2025–2026 Southern Yemen campaign	On 30 December 2025, the Yemeni Presidential Leadership Council declared a 72h long air, sea, and land blockade. The blockade coincides with the Saudi-Blockade of Yemen.
2026	Strait of Hormuz	Iran	2026 Iran war	Main article: 2026 Strait of Hormuz crisis Iran closed the Strait of Hormuz during the war starting the 2026 Iran war fuel crisis.
2026	Iran	United States	2026 Iran war	Main article: 2026 United States naval blockade of Iran The US carried out the 2026 Strait of Hormuz campaign in an attempt to reopen the Strait of Hormuz before announcing a blockade of Iran after Iran failed to reopen it.

== Current ==
Start of Blockade	Blockaded Territory	Blockader	Conflict	Details
1989	Armenia Republic of Artsakh (Nagorno-Karabakh) (until 2023)	Azerbaijan Turkey	Nagorno-Karabakh conflict	Main article: Turkish–Azeri blockade of Armenia (1989–ongoing) The blockade was initiated in 1989 by Azerbaijan, originally in response to the Karabakh movement which called for independence from Azerbaijan and reunification with Armenia. Turkey later joined the blockade against Armenia in 1993. The blockade aims at isolating Armenia (and Nagorno-Karabakh until 2023) to pressure the Armenian side to make concessions: namely, the resolution of the Nagorno-Karabakh conflict in Azerbaijan’s favor, the cessation of Armenia's pursuit of international recognition of Turkey’s genocide in Western Armenia, the ratification by Armenia of the 1921 borders inherited from the Kemalist-Soviet Treaty of Kars, and the establishment of an extraterritorial corridor through Armenian territory. Armenia is a landlocked country and therefore cannot conduct foreign trade without going through one of its neighbors. Turkey, Armenia’s historic enemy with whom it shares its largest border, is also an ally of Azerbaijan. Turkey and Azerbaijan have long refused to allow any Armenian trade over their air or land space. Lacking a sizeable enough border with Iran to facilitate major trade means Armenia is effectively dependent on the Georgia and Iran to conduct international trade. In order to avoid disturbing relations with Azerbaijan, Georgia imposes certain limits on Armenian imports.
2007	Gaza Strip	Israel Egypt	Gaza–Israel conflict	Main article: Blockade of the Gaza Strip Israel and Egypt closed all land border crossings to the Gaza Strip after the Battle of Gaza (2007) following the election of the Hamas Party and imposed a strict air and sea blockade. Israel claims that the blockade is necessary to prevent weapons from reaching Hamas, while Egypt claims that the blockade is intended to prevent Hamas from undermining the legitimacy of the Fatah-led Palestinian Authority after winning the election.
2015	Yemen	Saudi Arabia United Arab Emirates Bahrain Egypt	Saudi Arabian–led intervention in Yemen	See also: Blockade of Yemen After the Houthis overthrew President Abdrabbuh Mansur Hadi the Saudi government accused it of supporting Iran and blockaded the country. The United States and the United Kingdom provided naval and logistical support. The international community has criticized the blockade for creating a humanitarian crisis in Yemen including famine and a cholera outbreak.
2022	Ukraine	Russia	Russian invasion of Ukraine	Russia blockaded Ukraine's access to the Black Sea. After negotiations with Ukraine via Turkey, a corridor to export Grain was opened. It was briefly halted after the Kerch Bridge was attacked with a Truck Bomb.
2022	Oleshky, Ukraine	Russia	Russian invasion of Ukraine	Main article: Blockade of Oleshky A humanitarian crisis has been ongoing in the city due to placement of land mines, drone attacks and establishment of road blocks by Russian troops, preventing supply of food and medicaments, as well as disrupting evacuation of local civilians.
2025	Venezuela	United States	Operation Southern Spear	Main article: United States oil blockade during Operation Southern Spear The United States declared a blockade on all "sanctioned oil tankers" in and out of Venezuela.
2026	Cuba	United States	2026 Cuban crisis	See also: 2024–2026 Cuba blackouts and United States embargo against Cuba
2026	Saudi Arabia	Houthi Yemen	Middle Eastern crisis (2023–present)	Main article: Houthi blockade of Saudi Arabia The Red Sea crisis resumed during the 2026 Iran war and an official blockade against Saudi Arabia was announced a few months later.

== See also ==
- List of naval battles
- Naval supremacy
- Economic warfare
- Embargo
