= Asquith coalition ministry =

UK war-time government, 1915–1916

- 1915–1916
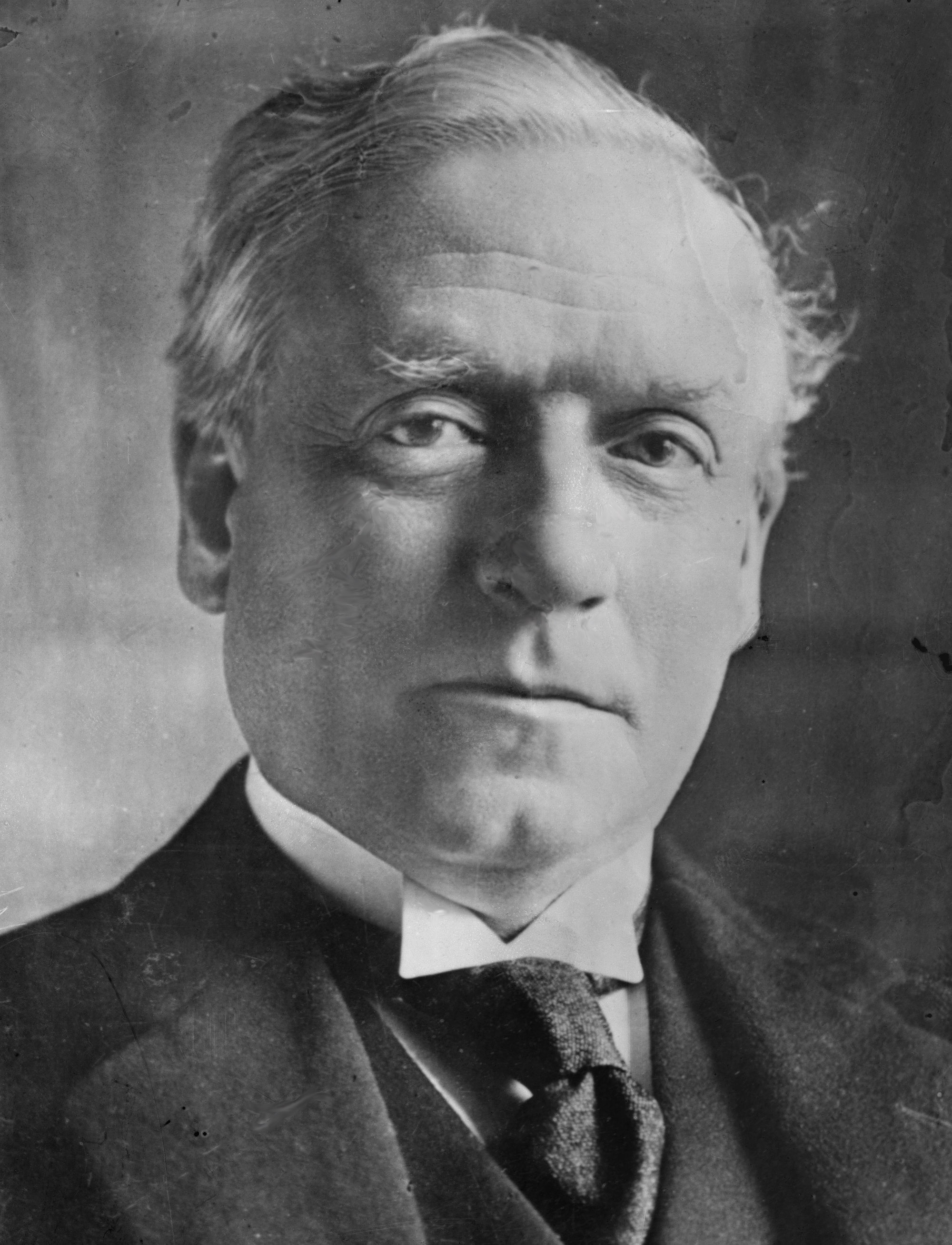
- Date formed: 25 May 1915
- Date dissolved: 5 December 1916

People and organisations
- Monarch: George V
- Prime Minister: H. H. Asquith (pictured)
- Prime Minister's history: 1908–1916
- Total no. of members: 85 appointments
- Member parties: Conservative Party; Labour Party; Liberal Party
- Status in legislature: Majority (coalition)
- Opposition party: Opposition Conservative Party (1915–1916)
- Opposition leader: Sir Edward Carson (1915–1916)

History
- Legislature terms: 30th UK Parliament
- Predecessor: Third Asquith ministry
- Successor: Lloyd George war ministry

The Asquith coalition ministry was the Government of the United Kingdom under the Liberal prime minister H. H. Asquith from May 1915 to December 1916. It was formed as a multi-party war-time coalition nine months after the beginning of the First World War (Note: The move resulted from intense attacks on his government claiming it had badly mishandled the war effort, especially regarding the Gallipoli campaign (against Constantinople) and the Shell Crisis (regarding shortage of ammunition on the Western Front).) but collapsed when the Conservative Party withdrew.

== History ==
The new Cabinet included nine Conservatives and one Labour minister, but the Liberals continued to hold most of the important posts;^{[R. 2003]} the Conservatives had demanded Cabinet seats, but they only received lesser positions. Not at all satisfied, Conservative Party leader Bonar Law continued the verbal attacks.

The ministry collapsed on 5 December 1916 as a result of Conservative resignations, who refused to serve under Asquith's leadership. Asquith and most of the Liberals then moved into opposition, while the Conservatives formed a new coalition with a minority of Liberals, under the leadership of Liberal David Lloyd George, the next day.

== Cabinet ==
Portfolio	Minister	Took office	Left office	Party
Prime Minister of the United Kingdom; First Lord of the Treasury; Leader of the House of Commons	H. H. Asquith (head of ministry)	5 April 1908	5 December 1916	Liberal
Chancellor of the Exchequer	Reginald McKenna	27 May 1915	10 December 1916	Liberal
Lord Chancellor	Stanley Buckmaster, 1st Viscount Buckmaster	25 May 1915	5 December 1916	Liberal
Lord President of the Council; Leader of the House of Lords	Robert Crewe-Milnes, 1st Marquess of Crewe	25 May 1915	10 December 1916	Liberal
Lord Privy Seal	George Curzon, 1st Earl Curzon of Kedleston	25 May 1915	December 1916	Conservative
Secretary of State for the Home Department	Sir John Simon	27 May 1915	12 January 1916	Liberal
Secretary of State for the Home Department	Herbert Samuel	12 January 1916	7 December 1916	Liberal
Secretary of State for Foreign Affairs	Sir Edward Grey, 3rd Baronet	10 December 1905	10 December 1916	Liberal
Secretary of State for the Colonies	Bonar Law	25 May 1915	10 December 1916	Conservative
Secretary of State for War	Herbert Kitchener, 1st Earl Kitchener	5 August 1914	5 June 1916	Independent
Secretary of State for War	David Lloyd George	6 July 1916	5 December 1916	Liberal
Secretary of State for India	Austen Chamberlain	25 May 1915	17 July 1917	Conservative
First Lord of the Admiralty	Arthur Balfour	25 May 1915	10 December 1916	Conservative
President of the Board of Agriculture and Fisheries	William Palmer, 2nd Earl of Selborne	25 May 1915	11 July 1916	Conservative
President of the Board of Agriculture and Fisheries	David Lindsay, 27th Earl of Crawford	11 July 1916	5 December 1916	Conservative
Minister of Blockade	Lord Robert Cecil	23 February 1916	18 July 1918	Conservative
President of the Board of Education	Arthur Henderson	25 May 1915	18 August 1916	Labour
President of the Board of Education	The Marquess of Crewe	18 August 1916	10 December 1916	Liberal
President of the Local Government Board	Walter Long	May 1915	December 1916	Conservative
Chief Secretary for Ireland	Augustine Birrell	23 January 1907	3 May 1916	Liberal
Chief Secretary for Ireland	Henry Duke	31 July 1916	5 May 1918	Conservative
Chancellor of the Duchy of Lancaster	Winston Churchill	25 May 1915	25 November 1915	Liberal
Chancellor of the Duchy of Lancaster	Herbert Samuel	25 November 1915	11 January 1916	Liberal
Chancellor of the Duchy of Lancaster	Edwin Montagu	11 January 1916	9 July 1916	Liberal
Chancellor of the Duchy of Lancaster	Thomas McKinnon Wood	9 July 1916	10 December 1916	Liberal
Minister of Munitions	David Lloyd George	25 May 1915	9 July 1916	Liberal
Minister of Munitions	Edwin Samuel Montagu	9 July 1916	10 December 1916	Liberal
Paymaster General	Arthur Henderson	18 August 1916	10 December 1916	Labour
Minister without Portfolio	Henry Petty-Fitzmaurice, 5th Marquess of Lansdowne	25 May 1915	December 1916	Conservative
Postmaster General	Herbert Samuel	26 May 1915	18 January 1916	Liberal
Postmaster General	Joseph Pease	18 January 1916	5 December 1916	Liberal
Secretary for Scotland	Thomas McKinnon Wood	13 February 1912	9 July 1916	Liberal
Secretary for Scotland	Harold Tennant	9 July 1916	5 December 1916	Liberal
President of the Board of Trade	Walter Runciman	5 August 1914	5 December 1916	Liberal
First Commissioner of Works	Lewis Harcourt	25 May 1915	10 December 1916	Liberal
Attorney General	Sir Edward Carson	25 May 1915	19 October 1915	Irish Unionist
Attorney General	Sir F. E. Smith	3 November 1915	10 January 1919	Conservative

== List of ministers ==
Office	Name	Date	Party
Prime Minister of the United Kingdom; First Lord of the Treasury; Leader of the House of Commons	H. H. Asquith	25 May 1915 – 5 Dec 1916	Liberal
Chancellor of the Exchequer	Reginald McKenna	25 May 1915	Liberal
Parliamentary Secretary to the Treasury; Government Chief Whip in the House of Commons	John Gulland	30 May 1915 – 5 Dec 1916	Liberal
Parliamentary Secretary to the Treasury; Government Chief Whip in the House of Commons	Lord Edmund Talbot	30 May 1915 – 5 Dec 1916	Conservative
Financial Secretary to the Treasury	Edwin Montagu (Note: Montagu entered the cabinet on 16 January 1916.)	26 May 1915	Liberal
Financial Secretary to the Treasury	Thomas McKinnon Wood	9 Jul 1916	Liberal
Junior Lords of the Treasury	Geoffrey Howard	30 May 1915 – 5 Dec 1916	Liberal
Junior Lords of the Treasury	George Roberts	30 May 1915 – 5 Dec 1916	Labour
Junior Lords of the Treasury	William Bridgeman	30 May 1915 – 5 Dec 1916	Conservative
Junior Lords of the Treasury	Walter Rea	30 May 1915 – 5 Dec 1916	Liberal
Lord Chancellor	Stanley Buckmaster, 1st Viscount Buckmaster	25 May 1915	Liberal
Lord President of the Council; Leader of the House of Lords	Robert Crewe-Milnes, 1st Marquess of Crewe	25 May 1915	Liberal
Lord Privy Seal	George Curzon, 1st Earl Curzon of Kedleston	25 May 1915	Conservative
Secretary of State for the Home Department	Sir John Simon	25 May 1915	Liberal
Secretary of State for the Home Department	Herbert Samuel	10 Jan 1916	Liberal
Under-Secretary of State for the Home Department	William Brace	30 May 1915	Labour
Secretary of State for Foreign Affairs	Sir Edward Grey, 3rd Baronet (Note: Grey was created 1st Viscount Grey of Fallodon on 27 July 1916.)	25 May 1915	Liberal
Parliamentary Under-Secretary of State for Foreign Affairs	Lord Robert Cecil (Note: Cecil joined the Cabinet on 23 February 1916.)	30 May 1915	Conservative
Secretary of State for the Colonies	Bonar Law	25 May 1915	Conservative
Under-Secretary of State for the Colonies	Arthur Steel-Maitland	30 May 1915	Conservative
Secretary of State for War	Herbert Kitchener, 1st Earl Kitchener	25 May 1915	Independent
Secretary of State for War	David Lloyd George	6 Jul 1916	Liberal
Under-Secretary of State for War	Harold Tennant	30 May 1915	Liberal
Under-Secretary of State for War	Edward Stanley, 17th Earl of Derby	6 Jul 1916	Conservative
Financial Secretary to the War Office	Henry Forster	30 May 1915	Conservative
Secretary of State for India	Austen Chamberlain	25 May 1915	Conservative
Under-Secretary of State for India	John Dickson-Poynder, 1st Baron Islington	30 May 1915	Liberal
First Lord of the Admiralty	Arthur Balfour	25 May 1915	Conservative
Parliamentary and Financial Secretary to the Admiralty	Thomas Macnamara	30 May 1915	Liberal
Civil Lord of the Admiralty	Victor Cavendish, 9th Duke of Devonshire (Note: Devonshire also served as Joint Government Chief Whip in the House of Lords.)	9 Jun 1915	Conservative
Civil Lord of the Admiralty	Victor Bulwer-Lytton, 2nd Earl of Lytton	26 Jul 1916	Conservative
President of the Board of Agriculture and Fisheries	William Palmer, 2nd Earl of Selborne	25 May 1915	Conservative
President of the Board of Agriculture and Fisheries	David Lindsay, 27th Earl of Crawford	11 Jul 1916	Conservative
Parliamentary Secretary to the Board of Agriculture and Fisheries	Francis Dyke Acland	30 May 1915	Liberal
Minister of Blockade	Lord Robert Cecil	23 Feb 1916	Conservative
President of the Board of Education	Arthur Henderson	25 May 1915	Labour
President of the Board of Education	Robert Crewe-Milnes, 1st Marquess of Crewe (Note: Crewe also served as Leader of the House of Lords.)	18 Aug 1916	Liberal
Parliamentary Secretary to the Board of Education	Herbert Lewis	30 May 1915	Liberal
President of the Local Government Board	Walter Long	25 May 1915	Conservative
Parliamentary Secretary to the Local Government Board	William Hayes Fisher	30 May 1915	Conservative
Chief Secretary for Ireland	Augustine Birrell	25 May 1915 – 3 May 1916	Liberal
Chief Secretary for Ireland	Henry Duke	31 Jul 1916	Conservative
Vice President of the Department of Agriculture for Ireland	Thomas Russell	30 May 1915	Liberal
Chancellor of the Duchy of Lancaster	Winston Churchill	25 May 1915	Liberal
Chancellor of the Duchy of Lancaster	Herbert Samuel	25 Nov 1915	Liberal
Chancellor of the Duchy of Lancaster	Edwin Montagu	11 Jan 1916	Liberal
Chancellor of the Duchy of Lancaster	Thomas McKinnon Wood	9 Jul 1916	Liberal
Minister of Munitions	David Lloyd George	25 May 1915	Liberal
Minister of Munitions	Edwin Montagu	9 Jul 1916	Liberal
Parliamentary Secretary to the Ministry of Munitions	Christopher Addison	30 May 1915 – 8 Dec 1916	Liberal
Parliamentary Secretary to the Ministry of Munitions	Arthur Lee	11 Nov 1915 – 9 Jul 1916	Conservative
Paymaster General	Thomas Legh, 2nd Baron Newton	9 Jun 1915	Conservative
Paymaster General	Arthur Henderson	18 Aug 1916	Labour
Minister without Portfolio	Henry Petty-Fitzmaurice, 5th Marquess of Lansdowne	25 May 1915	Conservative
Postmaster General	Herbert Samuel	26 May 1915	Liberal
Postmaster General	Joseph Pease	18 Jan 1916	Liberal
Assistant Postmaster-General	Herbert Pease	30 May 1915	Conservative
Secretary for Scotland	Thomas McKinnon Wood	25 May 1915	Liberal
Secretary for Scotland	Harold Tennant	9 Jul 1916	Liberal
President of the Board of Trade	Walter Runciman	25 May 1915	Liberal
Parliamentary Secretary to the Board of Trade	E. G. Pretyman	30 May 1915	Conservative
First Commissioner of Works	Lewis Harcourt	25 May 1915	Liberal
Attorney General	Sir Edward Carson	25 May 1915	Conservative
Attorney General	Sir F. E. Smith	3 Nov 1915	Conservative
Solicitor General	Sir F. E. Smith	2 Jun 1915	Conservative
Solicitor General	Sir George Cave	8 Nov 1915	Conservative
Lord Advocate	Robert Munro	8 Jun 1915	Liberal
Solicitor General for Scotland	Thomas Brash Morison	8 Jun 1915	Liberal
Attorney-General for Ireland	John Gordon	8 Jun 1915	Conservative
Attorney-General for Ireland	James Campbell	9 Apr 1916	Conservative
Solicitor-General for Ireland	James O'Connor	8 Jun 1915	Irish Parliamentary
Lord Steward of the Household	Horace Farquhar, 1st Baron Farquhar	9 Jun 1915	Conservative
Lord Chamberlain of the Household	William Mansfield, 2nd Baron Sandhurst	9 Jun 1915	Liberal
Vice-Chamberlain of the Household	Cecil Beck	30 May 1915	Liberal
Master of the Horse	Edwyn Scudamore-Stanhope, 10th Earl of Chesterfield	9 Jun 1915	Liberal
Treasurer of the Household	James Hope	30 May 1915	Conservative
Comptroller of the Household	Charles Roberts	30 May 1915	Liberal
Captain of the Gentlemen-at-Arms; Joint Government Chief Whip in the House of Lords	Edward Colebrooke, 1st Baron Colebrooke	9 Jun 1915	Liberal
Captain of the Yeomen of the Guard	Charles Harbord, 6th Baron Suffield	9 Jun 1915	Conservative
Lords-in-Waiting	Richard Herschell, 2nd Baron Herschell	9 Jun 1915	Liberal
Lords-in-Waiting	Wentworth Beaumont, 1st Viscount Allendale	9 Jun 1915	Liberal
Lords-in-Waiting	George Hamilton-Gordon, 2nd Baron Stanmore	9 Jun 1915	Liberal
Lords-in-Waiting	John Brocklehurst, 1st Baron Ranksborough	9 Jun 1915	Liberal
Lords-in-Waiting	Arthur Annesley, 11th Viscount Valentia	9 Jun 1915	Conservative
Lords-in-Waiting	Hylton Jolliffe, 3rd Baron Hylton (Note: Hylton served as Joint Government Chief Whip in the House of Lords from 26 July 1916.)	9 Jun 1915	Conservative

== See also ==
- History of the United Kingdom during the First World War § Government

== Notes ==
Preceded by Third Asquith ministry	Government of the United Kingdom; 1915–1916	Succeeded by Lloyd George war ministry
