= National Registration Act 1915 =

Act of the Parliament of the United Kingdom

National Registration Act 1915 (Note: Section 16(1).)
- Act of Parliament
- Parliament of the United Kingdom
- Long title: An Act for the compilation of a National Register.
- Citation: 5 & 6 Geo. 5. c. 60
- Territorial extent: England and Wales; Scotland; Northern Ireland (section 15) (Note: Section 15(7).)

Dates
- Royal assent: 15 July 1915
- Commencement: 15 July 1915 (Note: The Acts of Parliament (Commencement) Act 1793.)
- Expired: 11 November 1918 (Note: Section 16(2).)
- Repealed: 22 December 1927
Other legislation
Repealed by	Statute Law Revision Act 1927

Status: Repealed

Text of statute as originally enacted

The National Registration Act 1915 (5 & 6 Geo. 5. c. 60) was an act of the Parliament of the United Kingdom.

The act provided for the establishment of a register of every civilian in the country between the ages of 15 and 65. The objective was to deal with the labour crisis that arose because so many volunteers had joined the Forces that essential industries were left without key workers. The register was further intended to assist in efficient deployment of labour as the government imposed more controls on the workforce, and the forms listed any alternative trades for each individual, whether current or not. The register was also used when conscription was introduced in 1916.

Bernard Mallet, the Registrar General for England, set up a system whereby on registration day, 15 August 1915, everyone was to fill in a form showing personal details, nature of employment, and any other work which they were skilled and able and willing to do. The forms were organised by each local authority. However the Registrar General for Scotland devised a separate system whereby all forms were held centrally in Edinburgh.

After the war, all the records were destroyed.

== Subsequent developments ==
The whole act was repealed by section 1 of, and the part I of the schedule to, the Statute Law Revision Act 1927 (17 & 18 Geo. 5. c. 42), which came into force on 22 December 1927.

== See also ==
- Timeline of the United Kingdom home front during the First World War
- National Registration Act 1939
