= Blockade =

Prevention of trade or movement by force

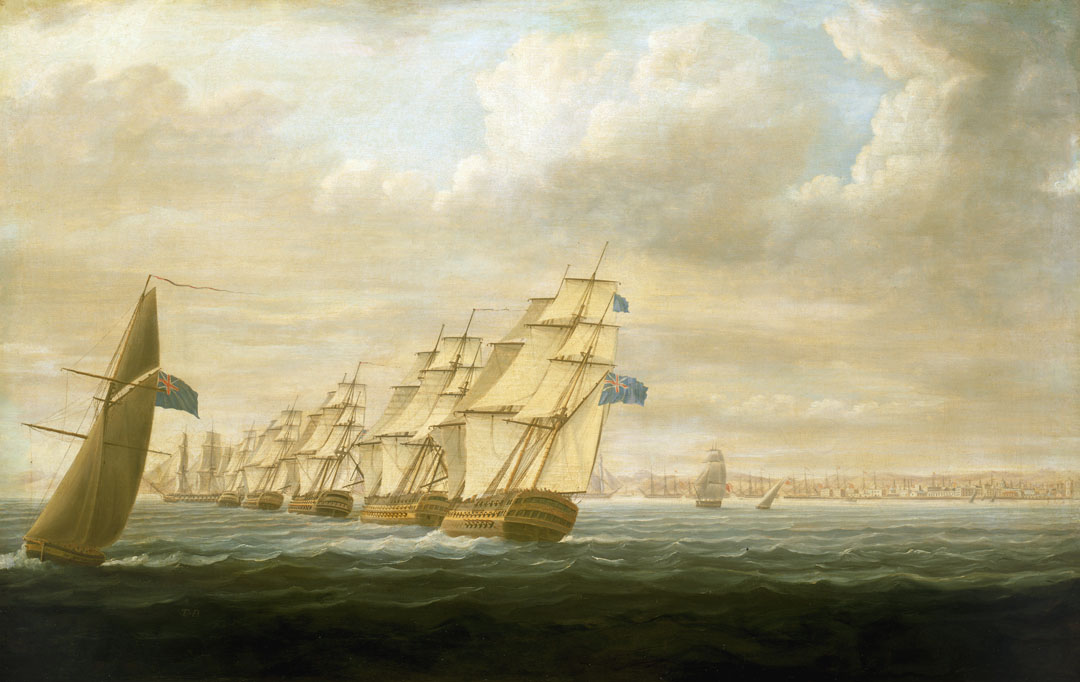
A painting of the Royal Navy blockading Cádiz in July 1797

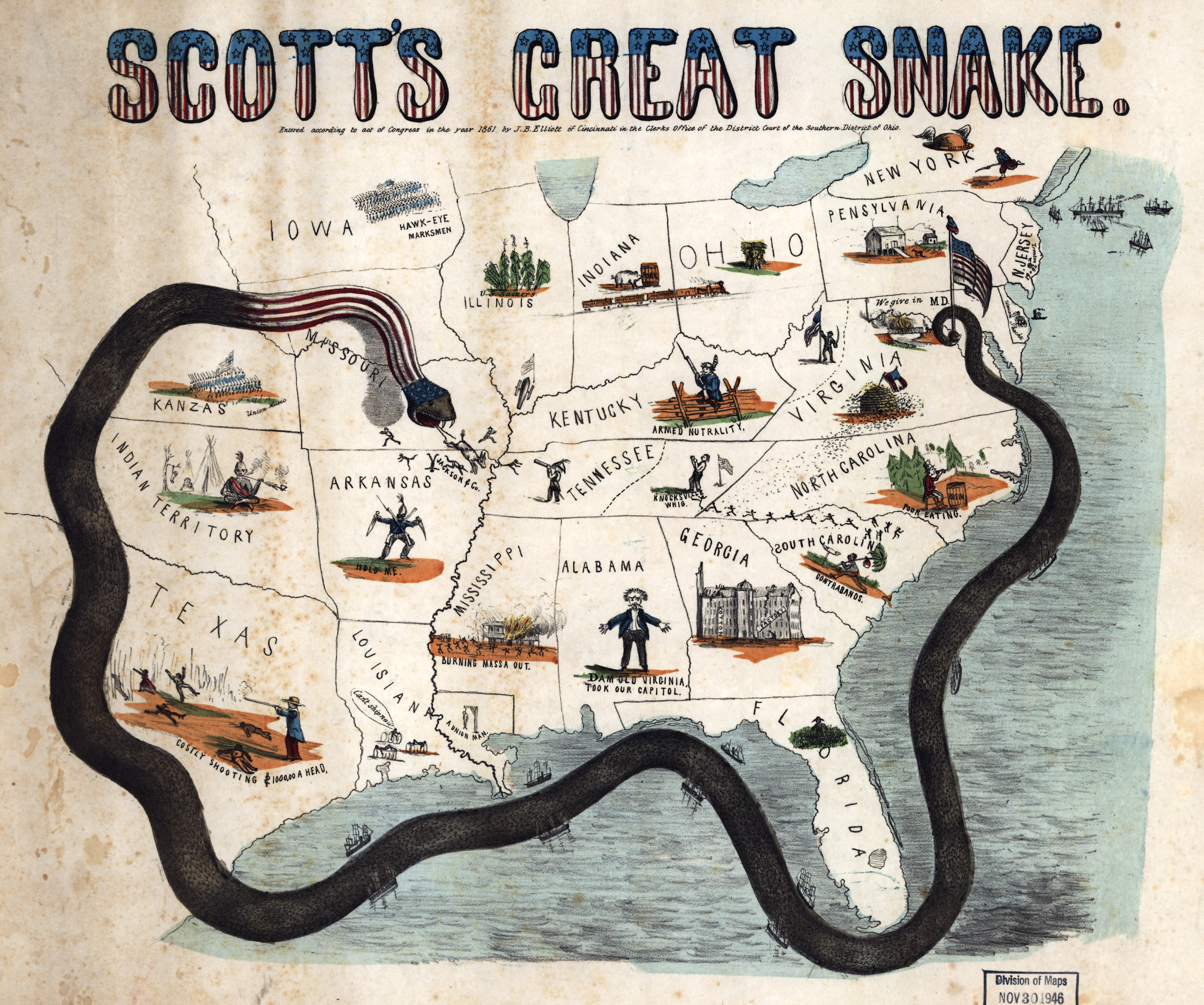
A cartoon map of the Anaconda Plan, which formed part of the Union blockade of the Confederacy

A blockade is the use of military force to prevent food, supplies, weapons, or communications, and sometimes people, entering or leaving a country or region. Unlike sanctions or an embargo, which are legal barriers to trade, a blockade is physical. Blockades are distinct from sieges in that a blockade is usually directed at an entire country or region, rather than a fortress or city, and the objective of a blockade is not necessarily to conquer the area. A blockade is directed at interdicting the movement of shipping and goods, and is therefore distinguished from a siege, which aims at the reduction of a defended place.

A blockading power can seek to cut off all maritime transport from and to the blockaded country, although stopping all land transport to and from an area may also be considered a blockade. Blockades restrict the trading rights of neutral parties, who must submit for inspection for contraband, which the blockading power may define narrowly or broadly, sometimes including food and medicine. In the 20th century, air power has also been used to enhance the effectiveness of blockades by halting air traffic within the blockaded airspace.

Close patrol of hostile ports, in order to prevent naval forces from putting to sea, is also referred to as a blockade. When coastal cities or fortresses were besieged from the landward side, the besiegers would often blockade the seaward side as well. Modern blockades have included cutting off electronic communications by jamming radio signals and severing undersea cables. Blockades often result in the starvation of the civilian population, notably during the blockade of Germany during World War I and the blockade of Biafra during the Nigerian Civil War.

== History ==
Although primitive naval blockades have been in use for millennia, early attempts were limited by the time ships were able to stay at sea uninterruptedly. The first successful attempts at establishing a full naval blockade were made by the British Royal Navy during the Seven Years' War (1754–1763) against France. Following the 1759 British naval victory at Quiberon Bay, which ended any immediate threat of a major invasion of Britain, the British Royal Navy established a close blockade on the French coast. This starved French ports of commerce, weakening France's economy. Admiral Edward Hawke took command of the blockading fleet off Brest and extended the blockade to cover the entire French Atlantic coast from Dunkirk to Bordeaux, and to Marseille on France's Mediterranean coast.

During the North American operations of the Seven Years' War, the British Royal Navy blockaded the French on the other side of the Atlantic, specifically impeding access and supply to the colonies of New France on the St. Lawrence. Blockades contributed to the French loss of Canada in 1763.

The strategic importance of blockade became increasingly apparent during the French Revolutionary Wars of 1792 to 1802 and in the Napoleonic Wars of 1803 to 1815, when the Royal Navy successfully blockaded France, leading to major economic disruptions. The Union blockade of southern ports was a major factor in the American Civil War of 1861 to 1865.

During World War I (1914–1918), the Allies blockaded the Central Powers, depriving them of food-supplies and strategic materials. Germany's attempted U-boat blockade of Britain caused some shortages, but ultimately failed. A similar outcome followed in World War II (1939–1945).

Naval strategic thinkers, such as Sir Julian Corbett (1854–1922) and Alfred Thayer Mahan (1840–1914), wrote that naval conflicts were won primarily by decisive battles, but also by blockade.

== Types of blockade ==
=== Close, distant, and loose blockades ===
A close blockade entails placing warships within sight of the blockaded coast or port, to ensure the immediate interception of any ship entering or leaving. It is both the most effective and the most difficult form of blockade to implement. Difficulties arise because the blockading ships must remain continuously at sea, exposed to storms and hardship, usually far from any support, and vulnerable to sudden attack from the blockaded side, whose ships may stay safe in harbor until they choose to come out.

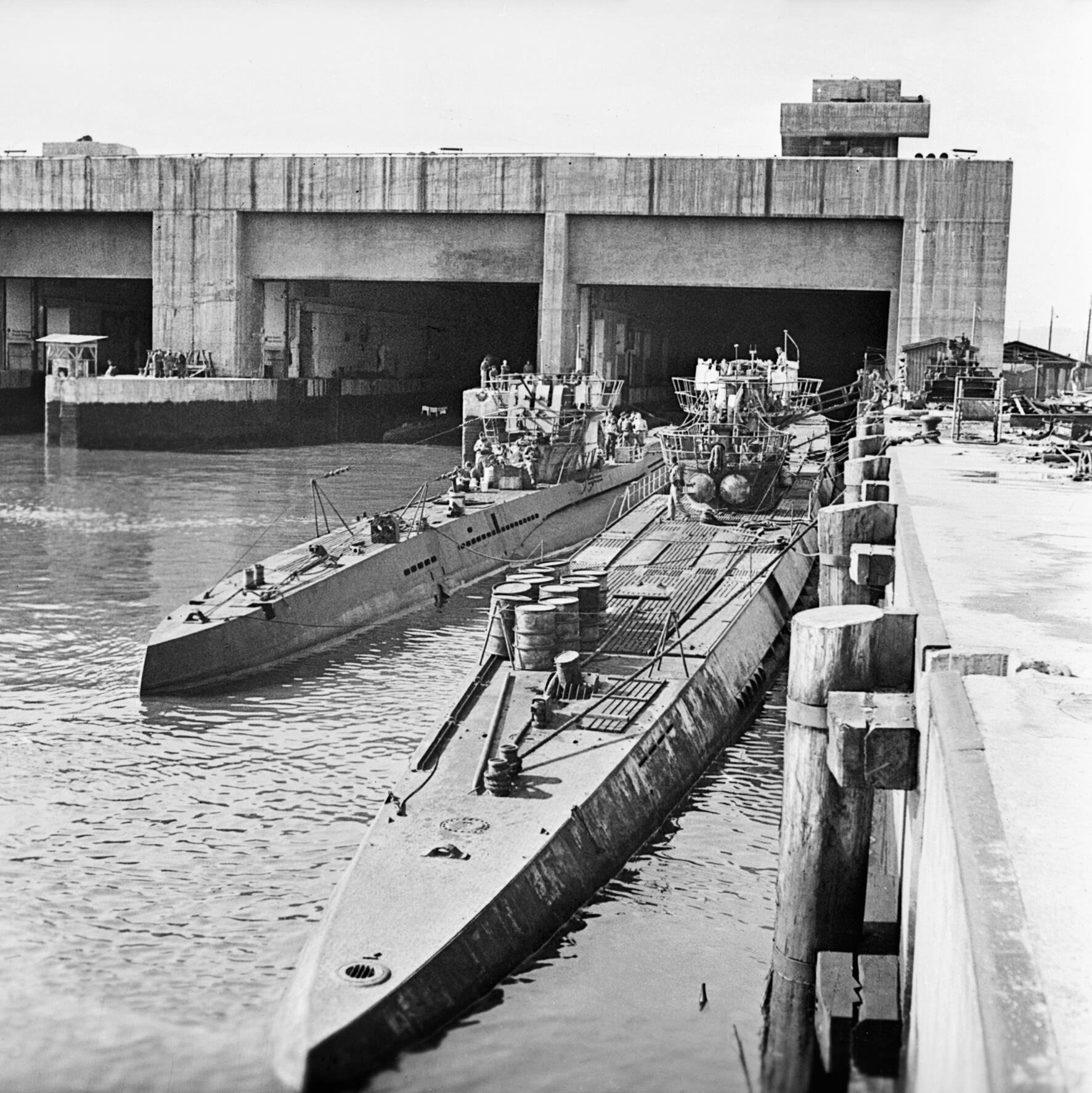
In World War II, German U-boats attempted to stop ships carrying food, supplies and matériel from reaching the United Kingdom, an example of a distant blockade.

In a distant blockade, the blockaders stay well away from the blockaded coast and try to intercept any ships going in or out. This may require more ships on station, but they can usually operate closer to their bases, and are at much less risk from enemy raids. This was almost impossible prior to the 16th century due to the nature of the ships used.

A loose blockade is a close blockade where the blockading ships are withdrawn out of sight from the coast, behind the horizon, but no farther. The object of loose blockade is to lure the enemy into venturing out but to stay close enough to strike.

British admiral Horatio Nelson applied a loose blockade at Cádiz in 1805. The Franco-Spanish fleet under Pierre-Charles Villeneuve then came out, resulting in the Battle of Trafalgar.

=== Pacific blockade ===
Until 1827, blockades, as part of economic warfare, were always a part of a war. This changed when France, Russia and Britain came to the aid of the Greek rebels against Turkey. They blockaded the Turkish-occupied coast, which led to the battle of Navarino. War was never declared, so it is considered the first pacific – i.e., peaceful – blockade. The first truly pacific blockade, involving no shooting at all, was the British blockade of the Republic of New Granada in 1837, established to compel New Granada to release an imprisoned British consul.

== Legal status ==
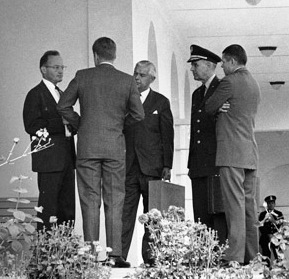
President Kennedy and his advisors discuss the Cuban Missile Crisis. Part of the US response to Soviet missiles being placed in Cuba was a naval blockade of the island.

Since 1945, the United Nations Security Council determines the legal status of blockades. By article 42 of the UN Charter, the council can also apply blockades. The UN Charter allows for the right of self-defense but requires that this must be immediately reported to the Security Council to ensure the maintenance of international peace.

According to the not ratified document San Remo Manual on International Law Applicable to Armed Conflicts at Sea, June 1994, a blockade is a legal method of warfare at sea, but is governed by rules. The manual describes what can never be contraband. The blockading nation is free to select anything else as contraband in a list, which it must publish.

The blockading nation typically establishes a blockaded area of water, and any ship can be inspected as soon as it is established that it is attempting to break the blockade. This inspection can occur inside the blockaded area or in international waters, but never inside the territorial waters of a neutral nation.

A neutral ship must obey a request to stop for inspection from the blockading nation. If the situation so demands, the blockading nation can request that the ship divert to a known place or harbour for inspection. If the ship does not stop, then the ship is subject to capture. If people aboard the ship resist capture, they can be lawfully attacked.

=== Act of war ===
According to modern international law, blockades are an act of war. A blockade is therefore only legal if applied in self-defense, and not as part of a war of aggression. Blockades are illegal when used as to starve or to collectively punish a civilian population. Such a blockade is a war crime and potentially a crime against humanity.

== Blockade planning ==
Blockades depend on four general factors:

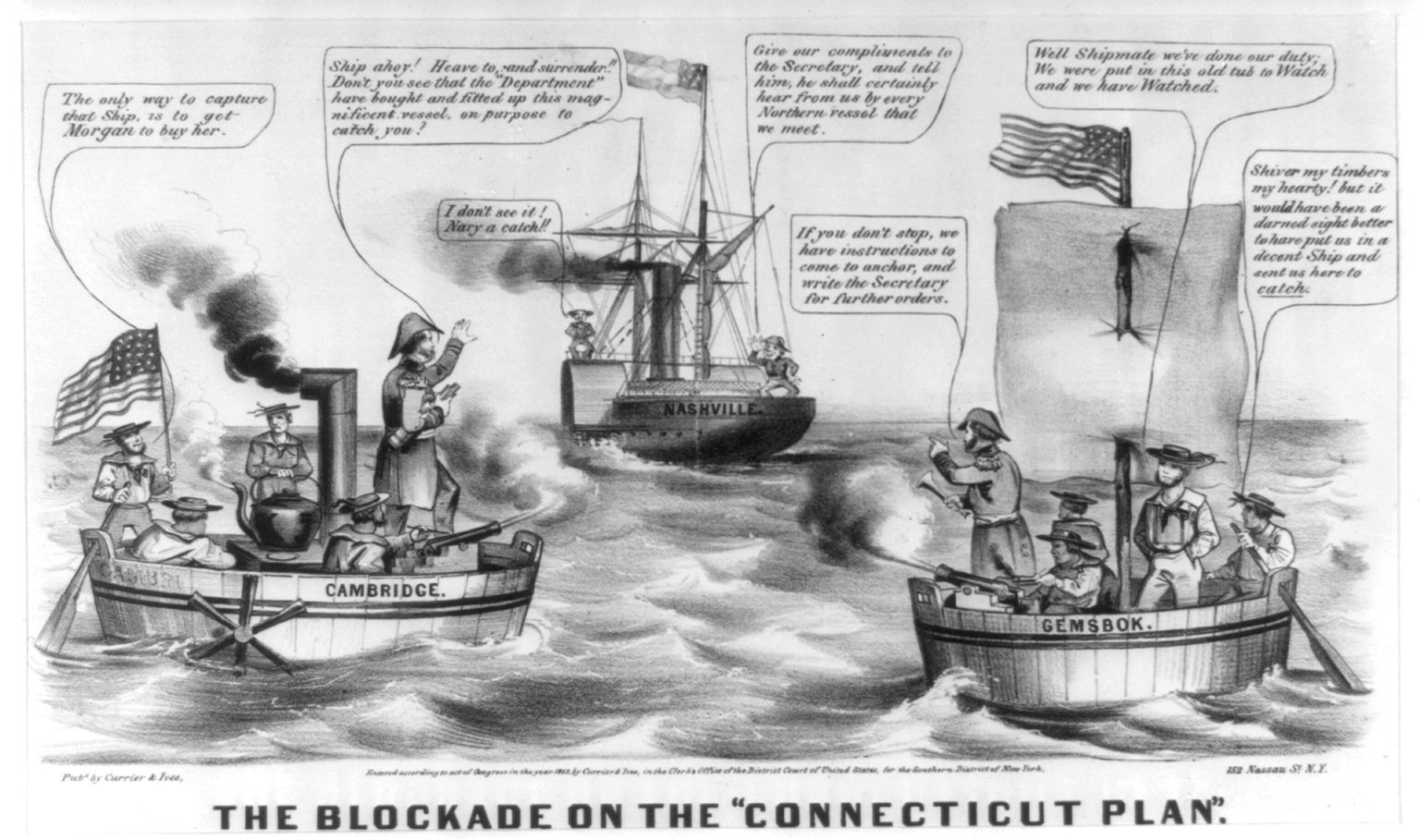
A Northern cartoonist ridicules the Union's initial attempts to blockade ports of the Confederacy in the American Civil War

- The value of the item being blockaded must warrant the need to blockade. For example, during the 1962 Cuban Missile Crisis, the items to be blockaded (or "quarantined" to use the more neutral term selected by President John F. Kennedy) were Medium-range ballistic missiles, capable of delivering nuclear weaponry, bound for Cuba. Their value was high, as a military threat against the United States.
- The strength of the blockading force must be equal to or greater in strength than the opposition. The blockade is only successful if the 'thing' in question is prevented from reaching its receiver. For example, the overwhelming power of the Royal Navy allowed a successful blockade of Germany during and after World War I.
- Geography. Knowing the routes of the enemy will help the blockader choose where to blockade: for example, a high mountain pass or a strait is a natural choke point and a candidate for fortification.
- A blockade tends to be a long campaign requiring a long-term commitment by the blockading power. The Atlantic U-boat campaign of World War I and Battle of the Atlantic were essentially about German blockades, and lasted nearly as long as their respective wars. The Imperial Japanese Navy, however, made only sporadic efforts at blockade during the Pacific War, preferring to seek victory by fleet action.

== Blockade running ==
Blockade running is the practice of delivering cargo, food, for example, to a blockaded area. It has mainly been done by ships called blockade runners to ports under naval blockade. Blockade runners were typically the fastest ships available and often lightly armed and armored. It is now also done by aircraft, forming airbridges, such as over the Berlin Blockade after World War II.

== See also ==
- Blockade of the Gaza Strip
- Blockade of Nagorno-Karabakh
- Blockade of Yemen
- Command of the sea
- List of blockades
- No-fly zone
- Sea lines of communication
- Navicert
