= Roadblock (disambiguation) =

A roadblock is a temporary installation set up to control or block traffic along a road.

Roadblock may also refer to:

- Traffic obstruction
  - Raasta roko ("obstruct the road" in Hindi), a commonly practiced form of protest in India

== Media and entertainment ==
- Roadblock (film), a 1951 crime thriller film
- Roadblock (G.I. Joe), a fictional character in the G.I. Joe universe
- Roadblock (Transformers), several characters in the Transformers toy line
- Roadblock (robot), a contestant on the TV show Robot Wars, who won the first series
- Roadblock (The Amazing Race), a task which has to be completed by only one person of a team on the CBS reality television series The Amazing Race
- "Roadblock" (song), a single from 1987 by Stock Aitken Waterman that peaked at number 13 in the UK Charts
- "Roadblox", a song by The Prodigy from The Day Is My Enemy
- Roblox, online video game, often mispronounced or misheard by adults as "roadblocks" or "road blocks".

== Sports ==
- WWE Roadblock, a professional wrestling event
- Roadblock (wrestler), American professional wrestler
