= Pacific blockade =

Type of maritime blockade without a war

A pacific blockade is a blockade exercised by a great power for the purpose of bringing pressure to bear on a weaker state without actual war. It can be employed only as a measure of coercion by maritime powers able to bring into action such vastly superior forces to those the resisting state can dispose of that resistance is out of the question. The term was created by Laurent-Basile Hautefeuille, a French writer on international maritime law.

In that respect, it is an act of war, and any attempt to exercise it against a power strong enough to resist would be a commencement of hostilities and at once bring into play the rights and duties affecting neutrals. Here, the concept of blockade is considered to be a form of aggression or warlike and not pacific. On the other hand, since the object and justification of a pacific blockade are to avoid war, general hostilities and disturbance of international traffic with the state against which the operation is carried on, rights of war cannot consistently be exercised against ships belonging to other states than those concerned. However, if neutrals were not to be affected by it, the coercive effect of such a blockade might be completely lost. Recent practice has been to limit interference with them to the extent barely necessary to carry out the purpose of the blockading powers.

== Origin ==
It is usual to refer to the intervention of France, Britain and Russia in Turkish affairs in 1827 as the first occasion on which the coercive value of pacific blockades was put to the test. The Greek coasts occupied by the Turkish forces were blockaded and each of these powers blockaded the coast or a portion of it while declaring that a state of peace is maintained. Neutral vessels were not affected by it. This was followed by a number of other coercive measures described in the textbooks as pacific blockades. These include a boycott so that the subject of the blockade is not only isolated but deprived of its ability to self-help.

The first case, however, in which the operation was really a blockade, unaccompanied by hostilities, and which therefore can be properly called a pacific blockade, was exercised in 1837 by Britain against New Granada. A British subject and consul of the name of Russell was accused of stabbing a native of the country in a street brawl. He was arrested and, after being kept in detention for some months, was tried for the unlawful carrying of arms and sentenced to six years of imprisonment. The British government resented the treatment as not only cruel and unjust towards Mr Russell but also disrespectful towards the British nation and so demanded the dismissal of the officials implicated and 1000 damages as some compensation for the cruel injuries which had been inificted upon Mr Russell (State Papers, 1837–1838, p. 183). New Granada refused to comply with those demands, and the British representative, acting upon his instructions, called in the assistance of the West Indian fleet, but observed in his communication to the British naval officer in command that it was desirable to avoid hostilities and to endeavour to bring about the desired result by a strict blockade only. That seems to be the first occasion on which it had occurred to anybody that a blockade without war might serve the purpose of war.

== Precedent ==
This precedent was shortly afterwards followed by another somewhat-similar case in which from April 16 to November 28, 1838, the French government blockaded the Mexican ports to coerce the Mexican government into acceptance of certain demands on behalf of French subjects who had suffered injury to their persons and damage to their property by insufficient protection by the Mexican authorities.

The blockade of Buenos Aires and the Argentine coast from March 28, 1838, to November 7, 1840, by the French fleet, a coercive measure consequent upon vexatious laws affecting foreign residents in the Argentine Republic, seems to have been the first case in which the operation was notified to the different representatives of foreign states. The notification was given in Paris and Buenos Aires, and to every ship approaching the blockaded places.

This precedent of notification was, a few years later (1845), followed in another blockade against the same country by Britain and France, and in one in 1842 and 1844 by Britain against the port of Greytown in Nicaragua. In 1850, Britain blockaded the ports of Greece in order to compel the Hellenic government to give satisfaction in the Don Pacifico case. Don Pacifico, a British subject, claimed 32,000 as damages for unprovoked pillage of his house by an Athenian mob. Greek vessels only were seized, and they were only sequestered. Greek vessels bonafide carrying cargoes belonging to foreigners were allowed to enter the blockaded ports.

Before the next case of blockade that can be described as pacific occurred came the Declaration of Paris (April 15, 1856), requiring that blockades to be binding must be effective; that is to say, maintained by a force sufficient that can prevent access to the coast of the enemy.

== 1860 ==
Some ill-defined measures of blockade followed such as that of 1860, when Victor Emmanuel, the king of Sardinia, joined the revolutionary government of Naples in blockading ports in Sicily, then held by the king of Naples, without any rupture of pacific relations between the two governments; that of 1862 in which Britain blockaded the port of Rio de Janeiro to exact redress for pillage of a British vessel by the local population and at the same time declaring that it continued to be on friendly terms with the emperor of Brazil; and that in 1880, when a demonstration was made before the port of Ulcinj by a fleet of British, German, French, Austrian, Russian and Italian men-of-war, to compel the Ottoman government to carry out the treaty conceding the town to Montenegro, and it was announced that if the town was not given up, by the Ottoman forces it would be blockaded.

The blockade that first gave rise to serious theoretical discussion on the subject was that instituted by France in 1884 in Chinese waters. On October 20, 1884, Admiral Courbet declared a blockade of all the ports and roadsteads between certain specified points of the island of Formosa. The British government protested that Coubert had not enough ships to render the blockade effective and that it was therefore a violation of one of the articles of the Declaration of Paris; moreover, that the French government could interfere only with neutral vessels violating the blockade if there was a state of war. If a state of war existed, Britain, as a neutral, was bound to close its coaling stations to belligerents. The British government held that in those circumstances, France was waging war and not entitled to combine the rights of peace and warfare for her own benefit. Since then, pacific blockades have been only exercised by the great powers as a joint measure in their common interest, which has also been that of peace; and in this respect the term is taking a new signification in accordance with the ordinary sense of the word 'pacific'.

== 1886 ==
In 1886, Greece was blockaded by Britain, Austria, Germany, Italy and Russia to prevent it from engaging in war with the Ottoman Empire and thus forcing the powers to define their attitude towards it. The instructions given to the British commander were to detain every ship under the Greek flag coming out of or entering any of the blockaded ports or harbours or communicating with any ports within the limit blockaded, but if any parts of the cargo on board of such ships belonged to any subject or citizen of any foreign power other than Greece, Austria, Germany, Italy and Russia and had been shipped before notification of the blockade or after such notification but under a charter made before the notification, the ship was not to be detained.

On the blockade of Crete in 1897, it was notified that the admirals in command of the British, Austro-Hungarian, French, German, Italian and Russian naval forces had decided to put the island of Crete in a state of blockade, that the blockade would be general for all ships under the Greek flag and that ships of the six powers or neutral powers may enter into the ports occupied by the powers and land their merchandise but only if it is not for the Greek troops or the interior of the island, and that these ships may be visited by the ships of the international fleets.

Since the adoption of the Hague Convention of 1907 respecting the limitation of the employment of force for the recovery of contract debts, the contracting powers are under agreement not to have recourse to armed force for the recovery of contract debts claimed from the government of one country by the government of another country as being due to its nationals unless the debtor state refuses or neglects to reply to an offer of arbitration or, after accepting the offer, prevents any compromise from being agreed on, or after the arbitration fails to submit to the award (Article I). Though that does not affect pacific blockades in principle, it supersedes them in practice by a new procedure for some of the cases in which they had been employed.

== 1900s ==
There is always the alternative of making the blockade an act of war, which was done in 1902–1903, when Britain, Germany and Italy proclaimed a blockade of certain ports of Venezuela and the mouths of the Orinoco. That blockade was not pacific but was war with all its consequences for belligerents and neutrals (see Foreign Office notice in London Gazette of December 20, 1902).
