= Liberal government, 1905–1915 =

Government of the United Kingdom

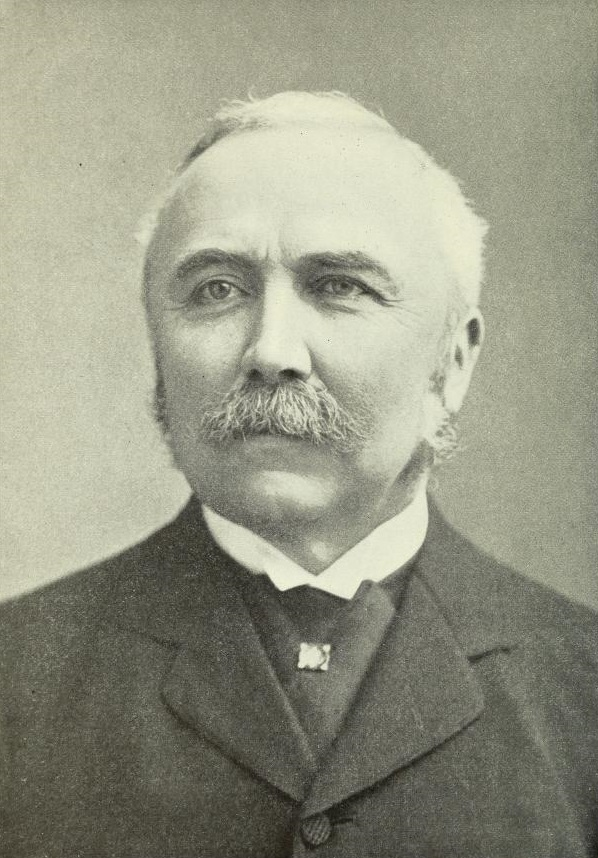
Henry Campbell-Bannerman led the government from 1905 to 1908 and was succeeded by H. H. Asquith.

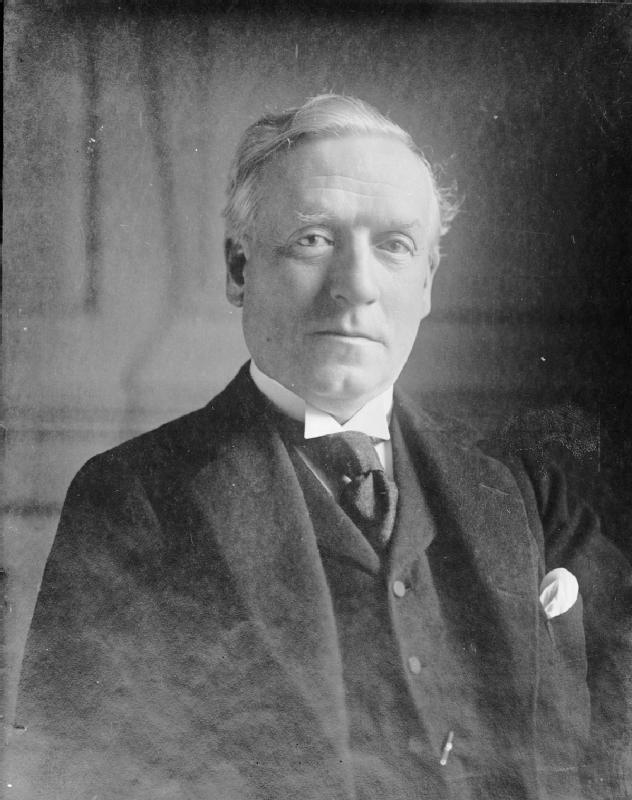
Asquith led the government from 1908. He formed a coalition in 1915 during the First World War.

The Liberal government of the United Kingdom of Great Britain and Ireland that began in 1905 and ended in 1915 consisted of four ministries: the first led by Henry Campbell-Bannerman (from 1905 to 1908) and the final three by H. H. Asquith (from 1908 onwards).

== Formation ==
With the fall of Arthur Balfour's Conservative government in the United Kingdom in December 1905, the Liberals under Sir Henry Campbell-Bannerman were called in to form a government. In the subsequent election, the Liberals won an enormous majority. Campbell-Bannerman was succeeded as prime minister by H. H. Asquith in 1908.

== Policies ==
The Liberal government was supported by 29 Labour Party MPs. Chancellor David Lloyd George crafted the People's Budget and introduced a great deal of social legislation, such as old age pensions and unemployment insurance for a significant part of the working population. For many working people, for whom in old age the threat of the workhouse was very real, these represented a very significant change. Equally groundbreaking was the Parliament Act 1911 which:

- Removed the law-making veto from the House of Lords thus rendering it constitutionally most expedient to run any future government from the House of Commons
- Enshrined into law the previous convention, which the Lords had broken in 1909, that the Lords may not reject Money Bills
- Cut the length of parliaments from seven years to five

Many of the members of Asquith's cabinet, however, opposed the social measures promulgated by leading figures such as Winston Churchill and David Lloyd George. This resistance was arguably a reflection of the extent to which many Liberals still adhered to the Party's Gladstonian, classical liberal tradition in spite of the growth of the "New Liberalism;" with a number ministers said to have been opposed to certain reforms, while several cabinet members (such as Crewe, Fitzmaurice, Harcourt, and McKenna) were critical of Lloyd George's progressive "People's Budget." Nevertheless, according to Neil Smith, the majority of the members of the Edwardian Liberal Cabinets were supportive of social reform and social progress. As noted by one study,

They (the Liberal Cabinet members) sought to respond to the discontent of the electorate by using the existing structure of government to correct the ills of society through innovative legislation. Two-thirds of the Liberal candidates, including Edwin Montagu, had pledged support for such measures during the campaign. While their support was often expressed in general terms, their intent was clear: Social and economic reform must be the first order of the new government.

== Fate ==
Although the government lost a great deal of support by the two general elections of 1910, they managed to hold on by dint of support from the Irish Parliamentary Party. After early mismanagement during the First World War, particularly the failure of the Dardanelles Campaign, Asquith was forced to bring the Unionists into the government in a coalition.

== Cabinets ==
=== Campbell-Bannerman ministry ===
Campbell-Bannerman ministry
- 1905–1908
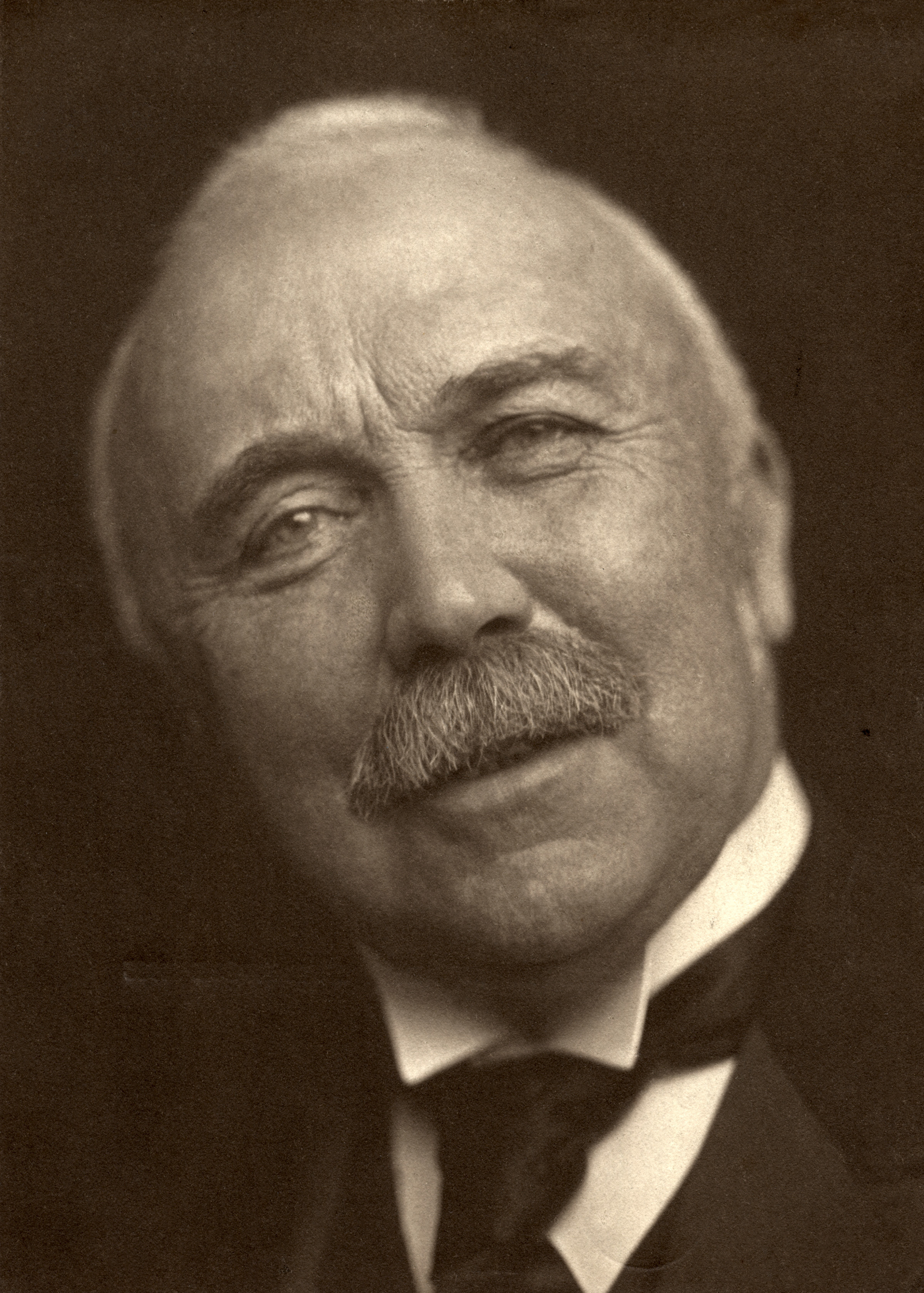
- Campbell-Bannerman
- Date formed: 5 December 1905
- Date dissolved: 5 April 1908

People and organisations
- Monarch: Edward VII
- Prime Minister: Sir Henry Campbell-Bannerman
- Member party: Liberal Party
- Status in legislature: Minority (1905–1906); Majority (1906–1908)
- Opposition party: Conservative Party
- Opposition leaders: Arthur Balfour (1905–1906); Joseph Chamberlain (1906); Arthur Balfour (1906–1908) in the House of Commons; Lord Lansdowne in the House of Lords

History
- Election: 1906 general election
- Legislature terms: 27th UK Parliament; 28th UK Parliament
- Predecessor: Balfour ministry
- Successor: First Asquith ministry

- Sir Henry Campbell-Bannerman – Prime Minister, First Lord of the Treasury and Leader of the House of Commons
- Robert Reid, 1st Baron Loreburn – Lord Chancellor
- Robert Crewe-Milnes, 1st Earl of Crewe – Lord President of the Council
- George Robinson, 1st Marquess of Ripon – Lord Privy Seal and Leader of the House of Lords
- H. H. Asquith – Chancellor of the Exchequer
- Herbert Gladstone – Secretary of State for the Home Department
- Sir Edward Grey, 3rd Baronet – Secretary of State for Foreign Affairs
- Victor Bruce, 9th Earl of Elgin – Secretary of State for the Colonies
- Richard Haldane – Secretary of State for War
- John Morley – Secretary of State for India
- Edward Marjoribanks, 2nd Baron Tweedmouth – First Lord of the Admiralty
- David Lloyd George – President of the Board of Trade
- Sir Henry Fowler – Chancellor of the Duchy of Lancaster
- Sir John Sinclair – Secretary for Scotland
- James Bryce – Chief Secretary for Ireland
- John Burns – President of the Local Government Board
- Charles Wyn-Carrington, 1st Earl Carrington – President of the Board of Agriculture
- Augustine Birrell – President of the Board of Education
- Sydney Buxton – Postmaster-General

==== Changes ====
- January 1907 – Augustine Birrell succeeds Bryce as Irish Secretary. Reginald McKenna succeeds Birrell at the Board of Education.
- March 1907 – Lewis Harcourt, the First Commissioner of Works, enters the cabinet.

=== Asquith ministry ===
Asquith ministries
- 1908–1910; Jan–Dec 1910; 1910–1915
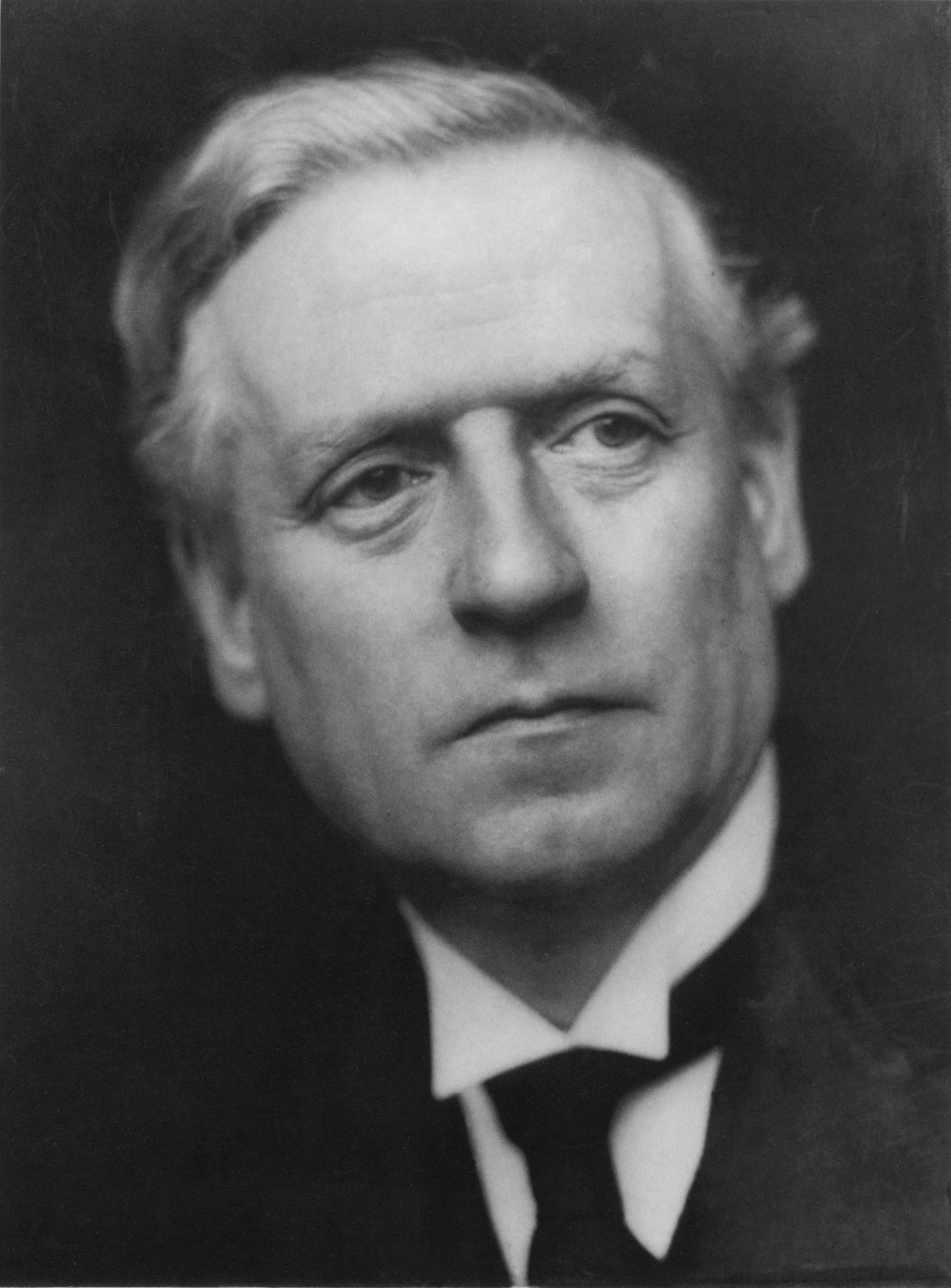
- Asquith (1908)
- Date formed: First: 5 April 1908; Second: 9 February 1910; Third: 19 December 1910
- Date dissolved: First: 9 February 1910; Second: 19 December 1910; Third: 25 May 1915

People and organisations
- Monarch: Edward VII (1908–1910); George V (1910–1915)
- Prime Minister: H. H. Asquith
- Prime Minister's history: 1908–1916
- Member party: Liberal Party
- Status in legislature: Majority (1908–1910); Minority (1910) dependent on IPP support
- Opposition party: Conservative Party
- Opposition leaders: Arthur Balfour (1908–1911); Bonar Law (1911–1915) in the House of Commons; Lord Lansdowne in the House of Lords

History
- Elections: Jan 1910 general election; Dec 1910 general election
- Legislature terms: 28th UK Parliament; 29th UK Parliament; 30th UK Parliament
- Budget: People's Budget
- Predecessor: C-Bannerman ministry
- Successor: Asquith coalition ministry

Office	Name	Term
Prime Minister; First Lord of the Treasury	H. H. Asquith	May 1908 – May 1915
Lord Chancellor	Robert Reid, 1st Baron Loreburn	April 1908 – June 1912
Lord Chancellor	Richard Haldane, 1st Viscount Haldane	June 1912 – May 1915
Lord President of the Council	Edward Marjoribanks, 2nd Baron Tweedmouth	April–September 1908
Lord President of the Council	Henry Fowler, 1st Viscount Wolverhampton	September 1908 – June 1910
Lord President of the Council	William Lygon, 7th Earl Beauchamp	June–November 1910
Lord President of the Council	John Morley, 1st Viscount Morley of Blackburn	November 1910 – August 1914
Lord President of the Council	William Lygon, 7th Earl Beauchamp	August 1914 – May 1915
Lord Privy Seal	George Robinson, 1st Marquess of Ripon	May–October 1908
Lord Privy Seal	Robert Crewe-Milnes, 1st Earl of Crewe	October 1908 – October 1911
Lord Privy Seal	Charles Wynn-Carrington, 1st Earl Carrington	October 1911 – February 1912
Lord Privy Seal	Robert Crewe-Milnes, 1st Marquess of Crewe	February 1912 – May 1915
Chancellor of the Exchequer	David Lloyd George	May 1908 – May 1915
Home Secretary	Herbert Gladstone	May 1908 – February 1910
Home Secretary	Winston Churchill	February 1910 – October 1911
Home Secretary	Reginald McKenna	October 1911 – May 1915
Foreign Secretary	Sir Edward Grey, 3rd Baronet	May 1908 – May 1915
Secretary of State for the Colonies	Robert Crewe-Milnes, 1st Earl of Crewe	May 1908 – November 1910
Secretary of State for the Colonies	Lewis Harcourt	November 1910 – May 1915
Secretary of State for War	Richard Haldane	May 1908 – June 1912
Secretary of State for War	Jack Seely	June 1912 – March 1914
Secretary of State for War	H. H. Asquith	March–August 1914
Secretary of State for War	Herbert Kitchener, 1st Earl Kitchener	August 1914 – May 1915
Secretary of State for India	John Morley, 1st Viscount Morley of Blackburn	May 1908 – November 1910
Secretary of State for India	Robert Crewe-Milnes, 1st Earl of Crewe	November 1910 – May 1915
First Lord of the Admiralty	Reginald McKenna	May 1908 – October 1911
First Lord of the Admiralty	Winston Churchill	October 1911 – May 1915
Chancellor of the Duchy of Lancaster	Henry Fowler, 1st Viscount Wolverhampton	May–September 1908
Chancellor of the Duchy of Lancaster	Edmond Fitzmaurice, 1st Baron Fitzmaurice	September 1908 – June 1909
Chancellor of the Duchy of Lancaster	Herbert Samuel	June 1909 – May 1910
Chancellor of the Duchy of Lancaster	Joseph Pease	May 1910 – October 1911
Chancellor of the Duchy of Lancaster	Charles Hobhouse	October 1911 – February 1914
Chancellor of the Duchy of Lancaster	Charles Masterman	February 1914 – January 1915
Chancellor of the Duchy of Lancaster	Edwin Montagu	January–May 1915
President of the Board of Trade	Winston Churchill	May 1908 – February 1910
President of the Board of Trade	Sydney Buxton	February 1910 – February 1914
President of the Board of Trade	John Burns	February–August 1914
President of the Board of Trade	Walter Runciman	August 1914 – May 1915
Secretary for Scotland	John Sinclair	May 1908 – February 1912
Secretary for Scotland	Thomas McKinnon Wood	February 1912 – May 1915
Chief Secretary for Ireland	Augustine Birrell	May 1908 – May 1915
President of the Local Government Board	John Burns	May 1908 – February 1914
President of the Local Government Board	Herbert Samuel	February 1914 – May 1915'
President of the Board of Agriculture	Charles Wynn-Carrington, 1st Earl Carrington	May 1908 – October 1911
President of the Board of Agriculture	Walter Runciman	October 1911 – August 1914
President of the Board of Agriculture	Auberon Herbert, 9th Baron Lucas	August 1914 – May 1915
President of the Board of Education	Walter Runciman	May 1908 – October 1911
President of the Board of Education	Joseph Pease	October 1911 – May 1915
Postmaster General	Sydney Buxton	May 1908 – February 1910
Postmaster General	Herbert Samuel	February 1910 – February 1914
Postmaster General	Charles Hobhouse	February 1914 – May 1915
First Commissioner of Works	Lewis Harcourt	May 1908 – November 1910
First Commissioner of Works	William Lygon, 7th Earl Beauchamp	November 1910 – August 1914
First Commissioner of Works	Alfred Emmott, 1st Baron Emmott	August 1914 – May 1915
Attorney General	Sir Rufus Isaacs	June 1912 – October 1913
Attorney General	Sir John Simon	October 1913 – May 1915

==== Changes ====
- September 1908 – Lord Wolverhampton succeeds Lord Tweedmouth as Lord President. Lord FitzMaurice succeeds Lord Wolverhampton as Chancellor of the Duchy of Lancaster.
- October 1908 – Lord Crewe succeeds Lord Ripon as Lord Privy Seal and Leader of the House of Lords, while remaining also Colonial Secretary.
- June 1909 – Herbert Samuel succeeds Lord FitzMaurice at the Duchy of Lancaster.
- February 1910 – Winston Churchill succeeds Herbert Gladstone as Home Secretary. Sydney Buxton succeeds Churchill at the Board of Trade. Herbert Samuel succeeds Buxton as Postmaster-General. Joseph Pease succeeds Samuel as Chancellor of the Duchy of Lancaster.
- June 1910 – Lord Beauchamp succeeds Lord Wolverhampton as Lord President.
- November 1910 – Lord Beauchamp succeeds Lewis Vernon Harcourt as First Commissioner of Public Works. Lord Morley of Blackburn succeeds Beauchamp as Lord President. Lord Crewe succeeds Morley as India Secretary, remaining also Lord Privy Seal. Lewis Harcourt succeeds Crewe as Colonial Secretary.
- October 1911 – Winston Churchill and Reginald McKenna switch offices, Churchill taking the Admiralty and McKenna the Home Office. Lord Carrington succeeds Lord Crewe as Lord Privy Seal. Crewe remains India Secretary. Walter Runciman succeeds Lord Carrington at the Board of Agriculture. Joseph Pease succeeds Runciman at the Board of Education. Charles Hobhouse succeeds Pease at the Duchy of Lancaster.
- February 1912 – Lord Crewe succeeds Lord Carrington as Lord Privy Seal, remaining also India Secretary. Thomas McKinnon Wood succeeds Lord Pentland as Secretary for Scotland.
- June 1912 – The Attorney-General, Sir Rufus Isaacs, enters the cabinet. Lord Haldane succeeds Lord Loreburn as Lord Chancellor. Jack Seely succeeds Haldane as Secretary for War.
- October 1913 – Sir John Simon succeeds Sir Rufus Isaacs as Attorney-General.
- February 1914 – John Burns succeeds Sydney Buxton as President of the Board of Trade. Herbert Samuel succeeds Burns at the Local Government Board. Sir Charles Hobhouse succeeds Samuel as Postmaster-General. Charles Masterman succeeds Hobhouse at the Duchy of Lancaster.
- March 1914 – Asquith temporarily succeeds Jack Seely as Secretary for War.
- August 1914 – Lord Beauchamp succeeds Lord Morley as Lord President. Lord Emmott succeeds Beauchamp as First Commissioner of Public Works. Walter Runciman succeeds John Burns as President of the Board of Trade. Lord Lucas succeeds Runciman at the Board of Agriculture. Lord Kitchener succeeds Asquith as Secretary for War.
- January 1915 – Edwin Montagu succeeds Charles Frederick Gurney Masterman as Chancellor of the Duchy of Lancaster.

== List of ministers ==
Members of the cabinet are in bold face.

Office	Name	Date
Prime Minister, First Lord of the Treasury and Leader of the House of Commons	**Sir Henry Campbell-Bannerman**	5 December 1905
Prime Minister, First Lord of the Treasury and Leader of the House of Commons	**H. H. Asquith**	5 April 1908 – 25 May 1915
Chancellor of the Exchequer	**H. H. Asquith**	10 December 1905
Chancellor of the Exchequer	**David Lloyd George**	12 April 1908
Parliamentary Secretary to the Treasury and Government Chief Whip in the House of Commons	George Whiteley	12 December 1905
Parliamentary Secretary to the Treasury and Government Chief Whip in the House of Commons	Jack Pease	3 June 1908
Parliamentary Secretary to the Treasury and Government Chief Whip in the House of Commons	Alexander Murray, Master of Elibank	14 February 1910
Parliamentary Secretary to the Treasury and Government Chief Whip in the House of Commons	Percy Illingworth	7 August 1912
Parliamentary Secretary to the Treasury and Government Chief Whip in the House of Commons	John Gulland	24 January 1915
Financial Secretary to the Treasury	Reginald McKenna	12 December 1905
Financial Secretary to the Treasury	Walter Runciman	29 January 1907
Financial Secretary to the Treasury	Charles Hobhouse	12 April 1908
Financial Secretary to the Treasury	Thomas McKinnon Wood	23 October 1911
Financial Secretary to the Treasury	Charles Masterman	13 February 1912
Financial Secretary to the Treasury	Edwin Montagu	11 February 1914
Financial Secretary to the Treasury	Francis Dyke Acland	3 February 1915
Junior Lords of the Treasury	Herbert Lewis	18 December 1905 – 7 July 1909
Junior Lords of the Treasury	Jack Pease	18 December 1905 – 3 June 1908
Junior Lords of the Treasury	Freeman Freeman-Thomas	21 December 1905 – 2 February 1906
Junior Lords of the Treasury	Cecil Norton	21 December 1905 – 7 July 1909
Junior Lords of the Treasury	John Fuller	2 February 1906 – 27 February 1907
Junior Lords of the Treasury	John Henry Whitley	27 February 1907 – 20 February 1910
Junior Lords of the Treasury	Oswald Partington	7 July 1909 – 19 January 1911
Junior Lords of the Treasury	John Gulland	7 July 1909 – 24 January 1915
Junior Lords of the Treasury	William Wedgwood Benn	20 February 1910 – 25 May 1915
Junior Lords of the Treasury	Ernest Soares	20 February 1910 – 16 April 1911
Junior Lords of the Treasury	Percy Illingworth	28 February 1910 – 7 August 1912
Junior Lords of the Treasury	William Jones	19 January 1911 – 25 May 1915
Junior Lords of the Treasury	Freddie Guest	16 April 1911 – 21 February 1912
Junior Lords of the Treasury	Sir Arthur Haworth	23 February 1912 – 16 April 1912
Junior Lords of the Treasury	Henry Webb	16 April 1912 – 25 May 1915
Junior Lords of the Treasury	Cecil Beck	3 February 1915 – 25 May 1915
Junior Lords of the Treasury	Walter Rea	3 February 1915 – 25 May 1915
Lord Chancellor	**Robert Reid, 1st Baron Loreburn** (Note: Created Earl Loreburn 4 July 1911.)	10 December 1905
Lord Chancellor	**Richard Haldane, 1st Viscount Haldane**	10 June 1912
Lord President of the Council	**Robert Crewe-Milnes, 1st Earl of Crewe**	10 December 1905
Lord President of the Council	**Edward Marjoribanks, 2nd Baron Tweedmouth**	12 April 1908
Lord President of the Council	**Henry Fowler, 1st Viscount Wolverhampton**	13 October 1908
Lord President of the Council	**William Lygon, 7th Earl Beauchamp**	16 June 1910
Lord President of the Council	**John Morley, 1st Viscount Morley of Blackburn**	3 November 1910
Lord President of the Council	**William Lygon, 7th Earl Beauchamp**	5 August 1914
Lord Privy Seal	**George Robinson, 1st Marquess of Ripon** (Note: Also Leader of the House of Lords 10 December 1905 – 14 April 1908.)	10 December 1905
Lord Privy Seal	**Robert Crewe-Milnes, 1st Earl of Crewe** (Note: Also Leader of the House of Lords; created Marquess of Crewe 3 July 1911.)	9 October 1908
Lord Privy Seal	**Charles Wynn-Carrington, 1st Earl Carrington**	23 October 1911
Lord Privy Seal	**Robert Crewe-Milnes, 1st Marquess of Crewe** (Note: Also Leader of the House of Lords.)	13 February 1912
Secretary of State for the Home Department	**Herbert Gladstone**	10 December 1905
Secretary of State for the Home Department	**Winston Churchill**	14 February 1910
Secretary of State for the Home Department	**Reginald McKenna**	23 October 1911
Under-Secretary of State for the Home Department	Herbert Samuel	12 December 1905
Under-Secretary of State for the Home Department	Charles Masterman	7 July 1909
Under-Secretary of State for the Home Department	Ellis Ellis-Griffith	19 February 1912
Under-Secretary of State for the Home Department	Cecil Harmsworth	4 February 1915
Secretary of State for Foreign Affairs	**Sir Edward Grey, 3rd Baronet**	10 December 1905
Under-Secretary of State for Foreign Affairs	Lord Edmond Fitzmaurice (Note: Created Baron Fitzmaurice 9 January 1906.)	18 December 1905
Under-Secretary of State for Foreign Affairs	Thomas McKinnon Wood	19 October 1908
Under-Secretary of State for Foreign Affairs	Francis Dyke Acland	23 October 1911
Under-Secretary of State for Foreign Affairs	Neil Primrose	4 February 1915
Secretary of State for the Colonies	**Victor Bruce, 9th Earl of Elgin**	10 December 1905
Secretary of State for the Colonies	**Robert Crewe-Milnes, 1st Earl of Crewe** (Note: Also Leader of the House of Lords.)	12 April 1908
Secretary of State for the Colonies	**Lewis Harcourt**	3 November 1910
Under-Secretary of State for the Colonies	Winston Churchill	12 December 1905
Under-Secretary of State for the Colonies	J. E. B. Seely	12 April 1908
Under-Secretary of State for the Colonies	Auberon Herbert, 9th Baron Lucas	23 March 1911
Under-Secretary of State for the Colonies	Alfred Emmott, 1st Baron Emmott	23 October 1911
Under-Secretary of State for the Colonies	John Dickson-Poynder, 1st Baron Islington	10 August 1915
Secretary of State for War	**Richard Haldane** (Note: Created Viscount Haldane 27 March 1911.)	10 December 1905
Secretary of State for War	**J. E. B. Seely**	12 June 1912
Secretary of State for War	**H. H. Asquith** (Note: Also Prime Minister.)	30 March 1914
Secretary of State for War	**Herbert Kitchener, 1st Earl Kitchener**	5 August 1914
Under-Secretary of State for War	Newton Wallop, 6th Earl of Portsmouth	12 December 1905
Under-Secretary of State for War	Auberon Herbert, 9th Baron Lucas	12 April 1908
Under-Secretary of State for War	J. E. B. Seely	23 March 1911
Under-Secretary of State for War	Harold Tennant	14 June 1912
Financial Secretary to the War Office	Thomas Buchanan	14 December 1905
Financial Secretary to the War Office	Francis Dyke Acland	12 April 1908
Financial Secretary to the War Office	Charles Mallet	4 March 1910
Financial Secretary to the War Office	Francis Dyke Acland	31 January 1911
Financial Secretary to the War Office	Harold Tennant	25 October 1911
Financial Secretary to the War Office	Harold Baker	14 June 1912
Secretary of State for India	**John Morley** (Note: Created Viscount Morley of Blackburn 2 May 1908.)	10 December 1905
Secretary of State for India	**Robert Crewe-Milnes, 1st Earl of Crewe** (Note: Also Leader of the House of Lords.)	3 November 1910
Secretary of State for India	**John Morley, 1st Viscount Morley of Blackburn**	7 March 1911
Secretary of State for India	**Robert Crewe-Milnes, 1st Earl of Crewe** (Note: Also Leader of the House of Lords; created Marquess of Crewe 3 July 1911.)	25 May 1911
Under-Secretary of State for India	John Ellis	12 December 1905
Under-Secretary of State for India	Charles Hobhouse	29 January 1907
Under-Secretary of State for India	Thomas Buchanan	12 April 1908
Under-Secretary of State for India	Alexander Murray, Master of Elibank	5 June 1909
Under-Secretary of State for India	Edwin Montagu	20 February 1910
Under-Secretary of State for India	Charles Roberts	17 February 1914
First Lord of the Admiralty	**Edward Marjoribanks, 2nd Baron Tweedmouth**	10 December 1905
First Lord of the Admiralty	**Reginald McKenna**	12 April 1908
First Lord of the Admiralty	**Winston Churchill**	23 October 1911
Parliamentary and Financial Secretary to the Admiralty	Edmund Robertson	12 December 1905
Parliamentary and Financial Secretary to the Admiralty	Thomas Macnamara	13 April 1908
Civil Lord of the Admiralty	George Lambert	18 December 1905
President of the Board of Agriculture and Fisheries	**Charles Wynn-Carrington, 1st Earl Carrington**	10 December 1905
President of the Board of Agriculture and Fisheries	**Walter Runciman**	23 October 1911
President of the Board of Agriculture and Fisheries	**Auberon Herbert, 9th Baron Lucas**	6 August 1914
Parliamentary Secretary to the Board of Agriculture and Fisheries	Sir Edward Strachey	20 December 1909
Parliamentary Secretary to the Board of Agriculture and Fisheries	Auberon Herbert, 9th Baron Lucas	23 October 1911
Parliamentary Secretary to the Board of Agriculture and Fisheries	Sir Harry Verney, 4th Baronet	10 August 1914
President of the Board of Education	**Augustine Birrell**	10 December 1905
President of the Board of Education	**Reginald McKenna**	23 January 1907
President of the Board of Education	**Walter Runciman**	12 April 1908
President of the Board of Education	**Jack Pease**	23 October 1911
Parliamentary Secretary to the Board of Education	Thomas Lough	18 December 1905
Parliamentary Secretary to the Board of Education	Thomas McKinnon Wood	13 April 1908
Parliamentary Secretary to the Board of Education	Sir Charles Trevelyan, 3rd Baronet	19 October 1908
Parliamentary Secretary to the Board of Education	Christopher Addison	10 August 1914
Chief Secretary for Ireland	**James Bryce**	10 December 1905
Chief Secretary for Ireland	**Augustine Birrell**	23 January 1907
Vice President of the Department of Agriculture for Ireland	Sir Horace Plunkett	12 December 1905
Vice President of the Department of Agriculture for Ireland	Thomas Russell	21 May 1907
Chancellor of the Duchy of Lancaster	**Sir Henry Fowler** (Note: Created Viscount Wolverhampton 4 May 1908.)	10 December 1905
Chancellor of the Duchy of Lancaster	**Edmond Fitzmaurice, 1st Baron Fitzmaurice**	13 October 1908
Chancellor of the Duchy of Lancaster	**Herbert Samuel**	25 June 1909
Chancellor of the Duchy of Lancaster	**Jack Pease**	14 February 1910
Chancellor of the Duchy of Lancaster	**Charles Hobhouse**	23 October 1911
Chancellor of the Duchy of Lancaster	**Charles Masterman**	11 February 1914
Chancellor of the Duchy of Lancaster	**Edwin Montagu**	3 February 1915
President of the Local Government Board	**John Burns**	10 December 1905
President of the Local Government Board	**Herbert Samuel**	11 February 1914
Parliamentary Secretary to the Local Government Board	Walter Runciman	18 December 1905
Parliamentary Secretary to the Local Government Board	Thomas Macnamara	29 January 1907
Parliamentary Secretary to the Local Government Board	Charles Masterman	12 April 1908
Parliamentary Secretary to the Local Government Board	Herbert Lewis	7 July 1909
Paymaster General	Richard Causton	12 December 1905
Paymaster General	Ivor Guest (Note: Created Baron Ashby St Ledgers 15 March 1910.)	23 February 1910
Paymaster General	Edward Strachey, 1st Baron Strachie	23 May 1912
Postmaster-General	**Sydney Buxton**	10 December 1905
Postmaster-General	**Herbert Samuel**	14 February 1910
Postmaster-General	**Charles Hobhouse**	11 February 1914
Assistant Postmaster-General	Sir Henry Norman	3 January 1910
Assistant Postmaster-General	Cecil Norton	20 February 1910
Secretary for Scotland	**John Sinclair** (Note: Created Baron Pentland 15 February 1909.)	12 April 1908
Secretary for Scotland	**Thomas McKinnon Wood**	13 February 1912
President of the Board of Trade	**David Lloyd George**	10 December 1905
President of the Board of Trade	**Winston Churchill**	12 April 1908
President of the Board of Trade	**Sydney Buxton**	14 February 1910
President of the Board of Trade	**John Burns**	11 February 1914
President of the Board of Trade	**Walter Runciman**	5 August 1914
Parliamentary Secretary to the Board of Trade	Hudson Kearley (Note: Created a Baronet 22 July 1908.)	18 December 1905
Parliamentary Secretary to the Board of Trade	Harold Tennant	10 January 1909
Parliamentary Secretary to the Board of Trade	J. M. Robertson	25 October 1911
First Commissioner of Works	Lewis Harcourt (Note: Entered cabinet 27 March 1907.)	10 December 1905
First Commissioner of Works	**William Lygon, 7th Earl Beauchamp**	3 November 1910
First Commissioner of Works	**Alfred Emmott, 1st Baron Emmott**	6 August 1914
Attorney General	Sir John Lawson Walton	12 December 1905
Attorney General	Sir William Robson	28 January 1908
Attorney General	Sir Rufus Isaacs (Note: Entered cabinet 4 June 1912.)	7 October 1910
Attorney General	**Sir John Simon**	19 October 1913
Solicitor General	Sir William Robson	12 December 1905
Solicitor General	Sir Samuel Evans	28 January 1908
Solicitor General	Sir Rufus Isaacs	6 March 1910
Solicitor General	Sir John Simon	7 October 1910
Solicitor General	Sir Stanley Buckmaster	19 October 1913
Lord Advocate	Thomas Shaw	12 December 1905
Lord Advocate	Alexander Ure	14 February 1909
Lord Advocate	Robert Munro	30 October 1913
Solicitor General for Scotland	Alexander Ure	18 December 1905
Solicitor General for Scotland	Arthur Dewar	18 February 1909
Solicitor General for Scotland	William Hunter	18 April 1910
Solicitor General for Scotland	Andrew Anderson	3 December 1911
Solicitor General for Scotland	Thomas Morison	30 October 1913
Attorney General for Ireland	Richard Cherry	20 December 1905
Attorney General for Ireland	Redmond Barry	2 December 1909
Attorney General for Ireland	Charles O'Connor	26 September 1911
Attorney General for Ireland	Ignatius O'Brien	24 June 1912
Attorney General for Ireland	Thomas Molony	10 April 1913
Attorney General for Ireland	John Moriarty	20 June 1913
Attorney General for Ireland	Jonathan Pim	1 July 1914
Solicitor General for Ireland	Redmond Barry	20 December 1905
Solicitor General for Ireland	Charles O'Connor	2 December 1909
Solicitor General for Ireland	Ignatius O'Brien	19 October 1911
Solicitor General for Ireland	Thomas Molony	24 June 1912
Solicitor General for Ireland	John Moriarty	25 April 1913
Solicitor General for Ireland	Jonathan Pim	20 June 1913
Solicitor General for Ireland	James O'Connor	1 July 1914
Lord Steward of the Household	Cecil Foljambe, 1st Baron Hawkesbury (Note: Created Earl of Liverpool 22 December 1905.)	18 December 1905
Lord Steward of the Household	William Lygon, 7th Earl Beauchamp	31 July 1907
Lord Steward of the Household	Edwyn Scudamore-Stanhope, 10th Earl of Chesterfield	22 June 1910
Lord Chamberlain of the Household	Charles Spencer, 1st Viscount Althorp (Note: Succeeded as 6th Earl Spencer 13 August 1910.)	18 December 1905
Lord Chamberlain of the Household	William Mansfield, 2nd Baron Sandhurst	14 February 1912
Vice-Chamberlain of the Household	Wentworth Beaumont (Note: Succeeded as 2nd Baron Allendale 13 February 1907.)	18 December 1905
Vice-Chamberlain of the Household	John Fuller (Note: Created a Baronet 7 July 1910.)	27 February 1907
Vice-Chamberlain of the Household	Geoffrey Howard	6 February 1911
Master of the Horse	Osbert Molyneux, 6th Earl of Sefton	18 December 1905
Master of the Horse	Bernard Forbes, 8th Earl of Granard	6 September 1907
Treasurer of the Household	Sir Edward Strachey	18 December 1905
Treasurer of the Household	William Dudley Ward	20 December 1909
Treasurer of the Household	Freddie Guest	21 February 1912
Comptroller of the Household	Alexander Murray, Master of Elibank	18 December 1905
Comptroller of the Household	Arthur Foljambe, 2nd Earl of Liverpool	12 July 1909
Comptroller of the Household	Geoffrey Twisleton-Wykeham-Fiennes, 18th Baron Saye and Sele	1 November 1912
Government Chief Whip in the House of Lords	Thomas Lister, 4th Baron Ribblesdale	18 December 1905
Government Chief Whip in the House of Lords	Thomas Denman, 3rd Baron Denman	29 May 1907
Government Chief Whip in the House of Lords	Edward Colebrooke, 1st Baron Colebrooke	15 March 1911
Captain of the Gentlemen-at-Arms	William Lygon, 7th Earl Beauchamp	18 December 1905
Captain of the Gentlemen-at-Arms	Thomas Denman, 3rd Baron Denman	31 July 1907
Captain of the Gentlemen-at-Arms	Edward Colebrooke, 1st Baron Colebrooke	26 June 1911
Captain of the Yeomen of the Guard	William Montagu, 9th Duke of Manchester	18 December 1905
Captain of the Yeomen of the Guard	Wenworth Beaumont, 2nd Baron Allendale	29 April 1907
Captain of the Yeomen of the Guard	William Craven, 4th Earl of Craven	2 October 1911
Lords in Waiting	Thomas Denman, 3rd Baron Denman	18 December 1905 – 31 July 1907
Lords in Waiting	Bernard Forbes, 8th Earl of Granard	18 December 1905 – 21 August 1907
Lords in Waiting	Richard Lyon-Dalberg-Acton, 2nd Baron Acton	18 December 1905 – 25 May 1915
Lords in Waiting	Granville Leveson-Gower, 3rd Earl Granville	18 December 1905 – 25 May 1915
Lords in Waiting	Gavin Hamilton, 2nd Baron Hamilton of Dalzell	18 December 1905 – 2 October 1911
Lords in Waiting	Edward Colebrooke, 1st Baron Colebrooke	21 February 1906 – 26 June 1911
Lords in Waiting	Richard Herschell, 2nd Baron Herschell	31 July 1907 – 25 May 1915
Lords in Waiting	Maurice Towneley-O'Hagan, 3rd Baron O'Hagan	1 November 1907 – 15 April 1910
Lords in Waiting	Dudley Marjoribanks, 3rd Baron Tweedmouth	15 April 1910 – 4 December 1911
Lords in Waiting	Freeman Freeman-Thomas, 1st Baron Willingdon	19 July 1911 – 31 January 1913
Lords in Waiting	Wentworth Beaumont, 1st Viscount Allendale	2 October 1911 – 25 May 1915
Lords in Waiting	Ivor Guest, 1st Baron Ashby St Ledgers (Note: Succeeded as 2nd Baron Wimborne 22 February 1914.)	31 January 1913 – 8 February 1915
Lords in Waiting	George Hamilton-Gordon, 2nd Baron Stanmore	1 May 1914 – 25 May 1915
Lords in Waiting	John Brocklehurst, 1st Baron Ranksborough	8 February 1915 – 25 May 1915

== See also ==
- Edwardian era
- List of British governments

Preceded by Balfour ministry	Government of the United Kingdom; 1905–1915	Succeeded by Asquith coalition ministry
