= Kenneth Mackay =

Kenneth Mackay may refer to:

- Kenneth Mackay (Australian politician) (1859–1935), Australian soldier and politician
- Buddy MacKay (Kenneth Hood MacKay Jr., born 1933), American politician and diplomat
- Kenneth Mackay, 2nd Earl of Inchcape (1887–1939), British businessman and peer
- Kenneth James William Mackay, 3rd Earl of Inchcape (1917–1994), British businessman and peer
- Kenneth Mackay (Australian general) (1917–2004), Australian general
