= Glenapp =

Glenapp or Glen App may refer to:

- The valley of the Water of App in South Ayrshire, Scotland
- Glenapp Castle
- The Viscount of Glennapp
- MV Glenapp (1918), and early motor passenger vessel
- The ship Glenapp, a refrigerated vessel and the commodore's ship in Convoy SC 122 in the Battle of the Atlantic
- Glenapp, Queensland, a neighbourhood and railway siding in south-east Queensland, Australia

== Geology ==
- Glenn App Fault, part of the Southern Uplands Fault
- Glenn App Sediment, an Ordovician sediment
- The Glen App Conglomerate
