= Asquith ministry =

Asquith ministry may refer to:

- First Asquith ministry, the British majority government led by H. H. Asquith from 1908 to January 1910
- Second Asquith ministry, the British minority government led by H. H. Asquith from January 1910 to December 1910
- Third Asquith ministry, the British minority government led by H. H. Asquith from December 1910 to 1915
- Fourth Asquith ministry, the British coalition government led by H. H. Asquith from 1915 to 1916
