= Jonathan Pim =

Jonathan Pim may refer to:

- Jonathan Pim (1806–1885), Irish philanthropist and Liberal politician, MP for Dublin
- Jonathan Pim (1858–1949), Irish lawyer and Liberal politician, Solicitor-General and Attorney-General for Ireland
