= BBJ (disambiguation) =

BBJ is an acronym for the Boeing Business Jet, a brand of business airplanes made by The Boeing Company.

BBJ or bbj can also refer to:

- BBJ, a U.K.-based media company founded by Jerry Buhlmann
- Bitburg Airport, an airport in Bitburg, Germany, by IATA code
- Braithwaite, Burn & Jessop Construction Company, a public construction company in India
- Budapest Business Journal, a Hungarian business magazine
- Crystal Palace line, a train line in London, England, U.K.
- Ghomalaʼ language, a language spoken in Cameroon, by ISO 639 code
- The Bellingham Business Journal, a former business journal based in Bellingham, Washington, U.S. from 1992 to 2020
