= Peter Mackay, 4th Earl of Inchcape =

British noble and politician (born 1943)

Kenneth Peter Lyle Mackay, 4th Earl of Inchcape (born 23 January 1943), known as Peter Inchcape, is a British peer, landowner, and business man. He was a member of the House of Lords from 1994 to 1999.

== Early life ==
The elder son of Kenneth Mackay, 3rd Earl of Inchcape and his wife Aline Thorn Pease, he has a younger brother, James Jonathan Thorn Mackay (born 1947), and both were educated at Eton College. Inchcape was then commissioned into the 9th/12th Royal Lancers, after training at the Mons Officer Cadet School. His sister was Lady Lucinda Louise Mackay, 13 December 1941 – 25 November 2024

He is a descendant of Cornelius Vanderbilt.

== Career ==
Inchcape became a director of companies and was chairman of Duncan MacNeill Tea International, Glenapp Estate Company, and Saracen Power Ltd. He was admitted as a member of the Royal Company of Archers.

On 17 March 1994, he succeeded as Earl of Inchcape and Viscount Glenapp, peerages created in 1929, and as Baron Inchcape (1911) and Viscount Inchcape (1924), all in the peerage of the United Kingdom, giving him a seat in the House of Lords.

He was Master of the Worshipful Company of Grocers for 1993-1994 and is a member of the Oriental Club.

He owns the Glenapp estate in Scotland, centred at Carlock House, near Ballantrae, Ayrshire, and also has houses in London and at Clyffe Pypard, Wiltshire. The Sunday Times Rich List 2005 estimated his fortune as £50M and put him at 938th in the list of the richest people in the United Kingdom.

== Family ==
Inchcape married Georgina Nisbet on 7 June 1966, and they have three children:

- Lady Elspeth Pease Mackay, born 3 November 1972
- Ailsa Fiona Stonor, Baroness Camoys, born 1 April 1977 (married William Stonor, 8th Baron Camoys, 20 March 2004)
- Fergus James Kenneth Mackay, Viscount Glenapp, born 9 July 1979

Inchcape is a half-nephew of the life peer Simon Mackay, Baron Tanlaw.

His heir, Viscount Glenapp, is married to Rebecca Jackson of Cottisford, Northamptonshire.

== Appointments ==
- Chairman of the Asia-Pacific Foundation, an antiterrorism think tank
- Deputy chairman of Austin Motors
- Director of Assam Oil & Natural Gas
- Trustee of the charity MapAction

Peerage of the United Kingdom
Preceded by Kenneth James William Mackay	Earl of Inchcape; 1994 – present Member of the House of Lords (1994–1999)	Incumbent; Heir: Fergus Mackay, Viscount Glenapp
