= James Mackay, 1st Earl of Inchcape =

British businessman and colonial administrator (1852–1932)

The Right Honourable The Earl of Inchcape GCSI GCMG KCIE DL
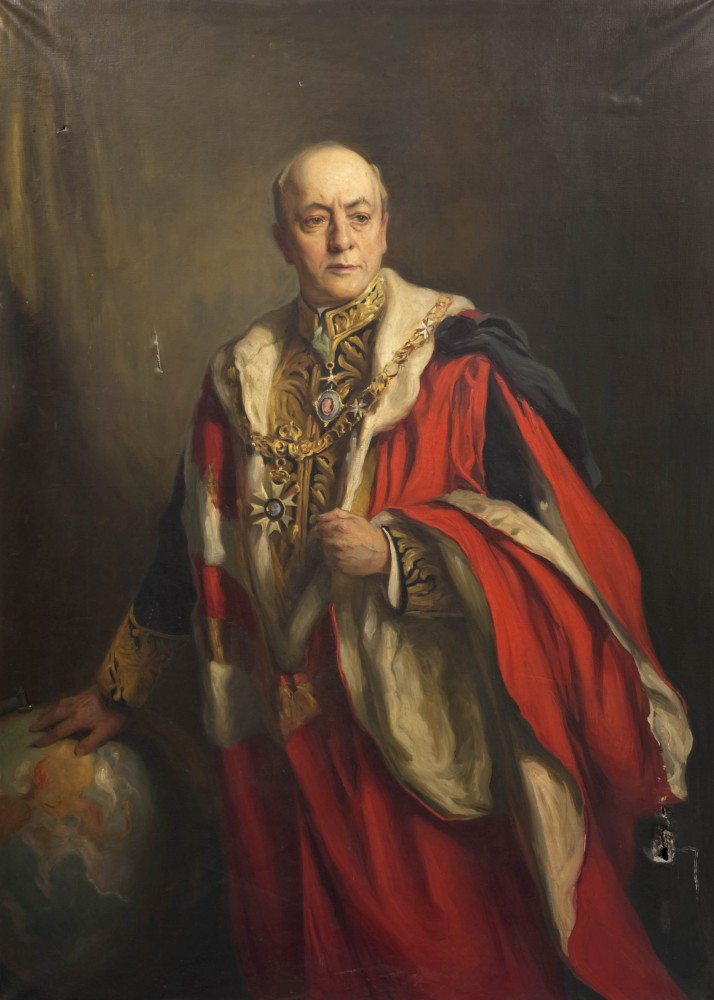
- The Earl of Inchcape, then Lord Inchcape, in 1921

Personal details
- Born: James Lyle Mackay; 11 September 1852 Arbroath, Scotland
- Died: 23 May 1932 (aged 79) Monte Carlo, Monaco
- Parent(s): James Mackay, Deborah Lyle
- Occupation: Businessman, shipping
- Known for: Co-founder of Inchcape plc

James Lyle Mackay, 1st Earl of Inchcape, GCSI, GCMG, KCIE, DL (11 September 1852 – 23 May 1932), known as Sir James Mackay from 1894 to 1911, was a British businessman and colonial administrator in India who became Chairman of the Peninsular and Oriental Steam Navigation Company ("P&O") and founded Inchcape Retail Ltd.

== Background ==
Mackay was the second son and fourth child of James Mackay of Arbroath, Scotland, a well-to-do shipmaster and his wife, Deborah Lyle. On his eighth birthday, Mackay's father took him on a flax run between Montrose, Angus and Archangel in Russia; thereafter he never "missed an opportunity to converse with captains in port".

After employment as a scrivener in Arbroath, Mackay joined a firm of rope and canvas makers where his employer recorded: "Jeemie is no bad laddie, but he's a damned sicht [sight] ower-ambitious".

== Career ==
Mackay's parents died when he was twelve, whereupon he inherited a substantial sum from his father. £2,000 of the bequest (equivalent to £219,704 in 2025) was invested in East India shipping, which provided an income of £100 per annum. In 1871, he secured employment with the shipbrokers and agents Gellatly, Hankey and Sewell, who were involved with the newly founded British-India Steam Navigation Company (BI).

The opening of the Suez Canal in 1869, which shortened the journey from London to Bombay by 4,000 miles (6,400 km), created a surge in trade between Europe and India. As a result, BI's Calcutta agents, Mackinnon Mackenzie & Co., asked their London based counterpart, Gray, Dawes & Co., for a new shipping assistant to handle the increased workload. Mackay got the job despite being the third choice, arriving in India in 1874. With the development of inland transport throughout the sub-continent, export opportunities in indigo, coal, tea, jute and wrought iron abounded and saw Mackinnon Mackenzie & Co. enjoy a steady increase in business. The collapse of the City of Glasgow Bank in October 1878 proved a disaster for BI's Bombay agents, Nichol and Co., but allowed Mackay to establish a new branch of Mackinnon Mackenzie & Co. in the city. At the age of 26 he became a partner in the Bombay firm and received a 10% share of the profits, increasing to 15% by 1884. As Mackay later recalled:

"Life in Bombay was extremely agreeable. I was elected a member of the Royal Bombay Yacht Club. I built a small yacht, which I named the Pinafore and had many delightful cruises in Bombay harbour. I became a member of the Bombay Hunt ... we had glorious hunts every Sunday in the cold weather, a pack of hounds being brought out every season from home, together with a huntsman. I had a bungalow out at Bandra and here I used to go for the week-ends all year round."

In 1881, Mackay returned home to Scotland following an attack of typhoid, apparently so weakened by fever that he had to be carried on board his ship at Bombay.

By 1914, Mackay was the sole surviving senior partner of the company that would be renamed Inchcape plc in 1981. Mackay was appointed President of the Bengal Chamber of Commerce in 1890, a member of the Legislative Council of the Viceroy of India in 1891 and a member of the Council of the Secretary of State for India in 1897, and the same year he became a member of the Council of India until 1911.

== Mackay Treaty ==
In October 1901, Mackay was appointed His Majesty´s Special Commissioner to conduct negotiations with representatives of China, arriving in Shanghai in early December for negotiations. The following year he and Chinese statesman Sheng Xuanhuai negotiated the Sino-British "Mackay Treaty," which anticipated the abolition of extraterritoriality in China. By late July 1902 the negotiations were reported as practically concluded when the British team arrived back in Shanghai, and the treaty was signed by Mackay and Sheng Xuanhua as representatives of their governments on 5 September 1902.

For his work on the treaty, Mackay was appointed a Knight Grand Cross of the Order of St Michael and St George (GCMG) in the November 1902 Birthday Honours list, and invested with the insignia by King Edward VII at Buckingham Palace on 18 December 1902.

== Later career ==
Mackay was Chairman of the UK Chamber of Shipping for 1903.

In 1907 Mackay was re-appointed as a member of the Council of India for a further period of five years.

Mackay was largely responsible for solving India's currency problems and for the adoption of the Gold Standard; he was made a baron by King George V for his services to industry and nation in 1911. Mackay later served as Vice-President of the Suez Canal Company, Chairman of the Peninsular and Oriental Steam Navigation Company ("P&O") and a Director of the Anglo-Persian Oil Company and the National Provincial Bank.

Mackay was appointed a Companion of the Order of the Indian Empire (CIE) in 1891, a Knight Commander of the Order of the Indian Empire (KCIE) in 1894, a Knight Grand Cross of the Order of St Michael and St George (GCMG) in 1902 and a Knight Commander of the Order of the Star of India (KCSI) in 1910. In 1911 he was raised to the peerage as Baron Inchcape, of Strathnaver in the County of Sutherland. He chose the title to commemorate the Inchcape Rock, which lies off Arbroath, and Strathnaver in Scotland. In the 1924 Birthday Honours he was made a Knight Grand Commander of the Order of the Star of India (GCSI) and created Viscount Inchcape, of Strathnaver in the County of Sutherland. In 1929 he was further honoured when he was made Viscount Glenapp, of Strathnaver in the County of Sutherland, and Earl of Inchcape.

== Death and legacy ==
Mackay died on 23 May 1932 aboard his yacht Rover in Monte Carlo, Monaco. He left unsettled personal estate valued at £552,809 in Great Britain (£33,362,476 in 2025). and was buried on the east side of Glenapp Church, Ballantrae, Ayrshire, close to the then family home at Glenapp Castle, on 31 May 1932. His ebony coffin with silver mountings carried his yachting cap and a wreath of lilies from his wife. Under the terms of his will, Mackay left £100 to each of the 202 commanders of P&O and BI vessels with £50 bequeathed to each of the 200 Chief Officers and 200 Chief Engineers "as a slight memento in acknowledgement of your loyalty and fidelity to me".

== Family ==
Lord Inchcape married Jean Shanks (c.1861–1937), a childhood friend from Arbroath, on 10 July 1883. They had five children:

- Kenneth Mackay, 2nd Earl of Inchcape (1887–1939). Married Frances Caroline Moriarty (1896–1933), daughter of John Francis Moriarty (1858–1915), Irish Lord Justice of Appeal, and his first wife Catherine Beatrice Kavanagh (1859–1898), on 22 September 1915; they were divorced in 1931. Married Leonora Brooke, daughter of White Rajah Charles Vyner Brooke and Sylvia Brett, Ranee of Sarawak on 1 June 1933.
- Lady Margaret Cargill Mackay (d. 1958), married Alexander Shaw, 2nd Baron Craigmyle.
- Lady Janet Lyle Mackay (d. 1972), married Lt-Col Frederick Bailey, a landowner.
- Lady Elsie Mackay (1893–1928), aviator, actress, and interior designer for P & O, married (later annulled) actor, Dennis Wyndham. Disappeared at sea while attempting an east-westerly Atlantic flight.
- Lady Effie Mackay (1895–1984), married Sir Eugen Millington-Drake, diplomat. Amongst their four children were the artist Teddy Millington-Drake (1932–1994) and the daughter Marie (1924–1973), who in 1960 married the 12th Duke of Carcaci, of an ancient Sicilian aristocratic family.

== Styles ==
- 1852–1891: James Lyle Mackay
- 1891–1894: James Lyle Mackay, CIE
- 1894–1902: Sir James Lyle Mackay, KCIE
- 1902–1910: Sir James Lyle Mackay, GCMG, KCIE
- 1910–1911: Sir James Lyle Mackay, GCMG, KCSI, KCIE
- 1911–1924: The Right Honourable The Lord Inchcape, GCMG, KCSI, KCIE
- 1924–1929: The Right Honourable The Viscount Inchcape, GCSI, GCMG, KCIE
- 1929–1932: The Right Honourable The Earl of Inchcape, GCSI, GCMG, KCIE

== See also ==
- Lord Inchcape
- Rover, Lord Inchcape's luxury yacht built in 1930

Peerage of the United Kingdom
New creation	Earl of Inchcape; 1929–1932	Succeeded by Kenneth Mackay
New creation	Viscount Inchcape; 1924–1932	Succeeded by Kenneth Mackay
New creation	Baron Inchcape; 1911–1932	Succeeded by Kenneth Mackay
