= Joseph Molony =

British barrister

Sir Joseph Thomas Molony, KCVO, QC (8 December 1907 – 28 May 1978) was a British barrister. He was Attorney-General to the Duchy of Cornwall from 1960 to 1969, Recorder of Bristol from 1964 to 1971, and Chairman of the General Council of the Bar from 1963 to 1966.

The second son of Sir Thomas Molony, Bt., last Chief Justice of Ireland, Joseph Molony was educated at Downside School and Trinity College, Cambridge, where he was a senior scholar and graduated MA and LLM in 1933. He was called to the bar in 1930 by the Inner Temple, receiving a Certificate of Honour, and was a Barstow Scholar and a Yarborough-Anderson Scholar. During the Second World War, he served in the Royal Air Force from 1940 to 1945 as a squadron leader. He was appointed a Queen's Counsel in 1955 and was Leader of the Western Circuit from 1964 to 1975.

He was the chairman of the Committee on Consumer Protection, known as the Molony Committee, which led to the creation of the Consumer Council.
