= Earl of Inchcape =

Earldom in the Peerage of the United Kingdom

Earldom of Inchcape
- Blazon Arms: Per chevron Azure and Argent, in chief two Lymphads Argent, and in base a Bengal Tiger proper. Crest: A Cubit Arm holding a Falcon proper. Supporters: Dexter: a Lion rampant Gules. Sinister: a Bengal Tiger proper. both supporting a Pendant Argent, charged with a Saltire Gules.
- Creation date: 20 June 1929
- Created by: George V
- Peerage: Peerage of the United Kingdom
- First holder: James Mackay, 1st Viscount Inchcape
- Present holder: Peter Mackay, 4th Earl of Inchcape
- Heir apparent: Fergus Mackay, Viscount Glenapp
- Remainder to: 1st Earl's heirs male of the body lawfully begotten
- Subsidiary titles: Viscount Inchcape; Viscount Glenapp; Baron Inchcape
- Status: Extant
- Motto: MANU FORTI (With a strong hand)

Earl of Inchcape is a title in the Peerage of the United Kingdom. It was created in 1929 for the Scottish shipping magnate and public servant James Mackay, 1st Viscount Inchcape. He had been created Baron Inchcape, of Strathnaver in the County of Sutherland, in 1911, and Viscount Inchcape, of Strathnaver in the County of Sutherland, in 1924. He was made Viscount Glenapp, of Strathnaver in the County of Sutherland, at the same time as he was given the earldom. These titles are also in the Peerage of the United Kingdom.

The family seat is Carlock House near Ballantrae, Ayrshire. The former family seat was Glenapp Castle, which is now a luxury hotel. It was sold by the Mackay family in 1982, having been acquired by the 1st Earl of Inchcape in 1917. The present Earl of Inchcape, however, still owns the Glenapp Estate.

== Earls of Inchcape (1929) ==
- James Lyle Mackay, 1st Earl of Inchcape (1852–1932)
- Kenneth Mackay, 2nd Earl of Inchcape (1887–1939)
- Kenneth James William Mackay, 3rd Earl of Inchcape (1917–1994)
- Kenneth Peter Lyle Mackay, 4th Earl of Inchcape (b. 1943)

The heir apparent is the present holder's only son Fergus James Kenneth Mackay, Viscount Glenapp (b. 1979).
The heir apparent's heir apparent is his son, the Hon. Alexander David James Mackay (b. 2017).

== Line of succession ==
Line of succession (simplified)
- Kenneth Mackay, 2nd Earl of Inchcape (1887–1939)
  - Kenneth James William Mackay, 3rd Earl of Inchcape (1917–1994)
    - Kenneth Peter Lyle Mackay, 4th Earl of Inchcape (born 1943)
      - (1). Fergus James Kenneth Mackay, Viscount Glenapp (b. 1979)
        - (2). Hon. Alexander David James Mackay (born 2017)
    - (3). Hon. James Jonathan Thorn Mackay (born 1947)
      - (4). Aidan James Turner Mackay (born 1978)
        - (5). Rowan James Finn Mackay (born 2011)
      - (6). Leon Phoenix Mairesse Mackay (born 2014)
    - (7). Hon. Shane Lyle Mackay (born 1973)
      - (8). Jonas Alexander Par Mackay (born 2004)
      - (9). Finn Lucas Par Mackay (born 2006)
    - (10). Hon. Ivan Cholmeley Mackay (b. 1976)
  - (11) Simon Brooke Mackay, Baron Tanlaw (born 1934)
    - male issue and descendants in remainder

== See also ==
- Inchcape
- Inchcape plc
