= Kenneth Mackay, 2nd Earl of Inchcape =

Kenneth Mackay, 2nd Earl of Inchcape (25 December 1887 – 21 June 1939) was a barrister, a businessman and an earl in the Peerage of the United Kingdom. He became Earl of Inchcape on 23 May 1932 after the death of his father, James Mackay, 1st Earl of Inchcape. During World War I he served with the 12th Royal Lancers and Machine Gun Corps as a Lieutenant.

== Education ==
Inchcape attended Eton, and Trinity College, Cambridge. He was admitted to the Inner Temple Bar as a barrister-at-law in 1910.

== Appointments ==
- President of P&O Bank
- Deputy Chairman and later Chairman of Marine Insurance Co. GEC
- Director of P&O
- Director of William Cory and Son
- Partner in Mackinnon, Mackenzie and Co. (Calcutta)
- Partner in MacDonald, Hamilton and Co. (Sydney)
- Partner in Gray Dawes and Co.

== Family ==
Inchcape was the son of James Mackay, 1st Earl of Inchcape, and Jean Paterson Shanks. Between 22 September 1915 and their divorce in 1931, Lord Inchcape was married to Frances Caroline Joan Moriarty, daughter of John Francis Moriarty, Lord Justice of the Irish Court of Appeal and his first wife Katherine Kavanagh. They had four children -

- Patricia Margery Kathleen Mackay (18 August 1916 - August 1973), socialite and part of the Happy Valley set
- Kenneth James William Mackay, 3rd Earl of Inchcape (27 December 1917 - 17 March 1994)
- Alan John Francis Mackay (6 September 1919 - 1 February 1999)
- James Lyle Mackay (19 October 1923 - 20 August 1941)

On 1 June 1933 he married Leonora Margaret Brooke, daughter of Charles Vyner Brooke, His Highness The Rajah of Sarawak and Sylvia Brett, Ranee of Sarawak. They had two children -

- Simon Mackay, Baron Tanlaw (born 30 March 1934)
- Rosemary Mackay (born 5 November 1936)

Peerage of the United Kingdom
Preceded by James Mackay	Earl of Inchcape; 1932 – 1939	Succeeded by Kenneth James William Mackay
