= Asia Mackay =

British author

The Honourable Asia Mackay
- Born: Asia Brooke Mackay; 1980 (age 45–46)
- Education: Durham University
- Spouse: Andrew Trotter (m. 2007)
- Children: 4
- Father: Simon Mackay, Baron Tanlaw

Asia Brooke Mackay (born 1980) is a British author. Her novels include Killing It (2018), a Comedy Women in Print Prize runner-up, and A Serial Killer's Guide to Marriage (2025).

== Early life and education ==
Mackay was born in East London to Scottish peer Simon Mackay, Baron Tanlaw and Rina Siew Yong. Mackay graduated with a degree in Anthropology from Durham University. Through the Comedy Women in Print Prize, she won a place in the University of Hertfordshire's MA Creative Writing programme.

== Career ==
Ahead of its release, Mackay's debut novel came second in the Richard & Judy Search for a Bestseller competition. In 2017, Bonnier Zaffre acquired the rights to publish Mackay's debut novel Killing It in 2018. Killing It was named a thriller of the month by John Dugdale of The Sunday Times and a runner-up for the Comedy Women in Print Prize in the Published Novel category. This was followed by a sequel The Nursery, published in 2019.

In 2023, Wildfire (a Hachette UK imprint) acquired the rights to publish Mackay's third novel A Serial Killer's Guide to Marriage in 2025. Georgia Tennant and Kyle Soller narrated the audiobook. A Serial Killer's Guide to Marriage was longlisted for the Comedy Women in Print Prize and was a BBC Radio 2 Book Club pick and shortlisted for the Radio 2 Book Club British Book Award.

== Personal life ==
Mackay married Andrew Trotter at Langholm Parish Church in 2007. They have four children.

== Bibliography ==
=== Alexis Taylor ===
- Killing It (2018)
- The Nursery (2019)

=== Standalones ===
- A Serial Killer's Guide to Marriage (2024)
- Self-Help for Serial Killers (2026)
