= Martin Jacomb =

British businessman (1929–2024)

Sir Martin Wakefield Jacomb
- Born: 11 November 1929
- Died: 8 June 2024 (aged 94)
- Education: Eton College and Worcester College, Oxford
- Occupations: businessman, barrister
- Known for: Chancellor of the University of Buckingham, Chairman of Canary Wharf Group, Vice-Chairman of Kleinwort Benson, Deputy Chairman of Barclays Bank
- Awards: Knight Bachelor (1985)

Sir Martin Wakefield Jacomb (11 November 1929 – 8 June 2024) was a Chancellor of the University of Buckingham and Chairman of Canary Wharf Group. He was a vice-chairman of Kleinwort Benson Ltd, from 1976 to 1985, and a deputy chairman of Barclays Bank between 1985 and 1993.

== Life and career ==
Jacomb was born on 11 November 1929, and was educated at Eton College and Worcester College, Oxford. He was called to the Bar at Inner Temple in 1955 and practised as a barrister until 1968 before embarking upon a successful career in business. In 1985, he was appointed Knight Bachelor by HM The Queen.

In 1986, he described insider trading as a "victimless crime."

In 1998, he was appointed the third Chancellor of the University of Buckingham in succession to Baroness Thatcher, who in turn succeeded Lord Hailsham of St Marylebone. He was installed in 1999. According to the University of Buckingham, which is one of the two British private universities, "He [Jacomb] is a strong believer in the need for universities to be independent of the government". He has written that if universities are "to nurture genuinely free and creative academic research" and "be the guardians of liberty which a free society needs" they must be independent of government funding.

Jacomb wrote that the University of Oxford should become private in order to avoid an authoritarian government imposing restrictions on admissions. Further, the university's academics will only be able to challenge prevailing opinion if they are independent of government funding. Dependence on government funding, he argued, has had disastrous effects on the higher education sector in continental Europe. Jacomb retired from the chancellorship in March 2010. He was succeeded by Lord Tanlaw.

Jacomb died on 8 June 2024, at the age of 94.

== Articles by Martin Jacomb ==
- List of articles in The Spectator
- List of articles in The Financial Times
