= Kenneth James William Mackay, 3rd Earl of Inchcape =

Kenneth James William Mackay, 3rd Earl of Inchcape (27 December 1917 – 17 March 1994), was a businessman and an earl in the Peerage of the United Kingdom. He became Earl of Inchcape on 21 June 1939 after the death of his father, Kenneth Mackay, 2nd Earl of Inchcape. During the Second World War, he gained the rank of Lieutenant with the 12th Royal Lancers and Major with the 27th Lancers.

== Education ==
Inchcape attended Eton, and Trinity College, Cambridge.

== Appointments ==
- Director (1957–1983), Chairman (1973–1983), and Chief Executive (1978–1981) of P&O
- Chairman and Chief Executive of Inchcape (1958–1982)
- Chairman of the Committee for Middle East Trade [COMET] (1963–1965)
- President of the Royal Society for India, Pakistan and Ceylon (1970–1976)
- President of the General Council of British Shipping (1976–1977)
- Director of Burmah Oil
- Director of Standard Chartered
- Director of The Chartered Bank
- Director of BP
- Director of Guardian Royal Exchange

== Family ==
Inchcape was the son of Kenneth Mackay, 2nd Earl of Inchcape, and his first wife Joan Moriarty, daughter of John Francis Moriarty, Lord Justice of the Irish Court of Appeal. His half-brother on his father's side was the life peer Simon Mackay, Baron Tanlaw.

Between 12 February 1941 and their divorce in 1954, Lord Inchcape was married to Aline Thorn Pease, widow of an R.A.F. officer, and daughter of Sir Richard Pease, 2nd Baronet and Jeanette Thorn Kissel. They had four children –

- Lady Lucinda Louise Mackay, 13 December 1941 – 25 November 2024
- Peter Mackay, 4th Earl of Inchcape, born 23 January 1943
- Hon. James Jonathan Thorn Mackay, born 28 May 1947
- Hon. Kenneth James William, born 16 December 1953

On 3 February 1965 he married Caroline Harrison, daughter of Cholmeley Dering Cholmeley-Harrison and Barbara Mary Corisande Bellew, with whom he had three sons (two by birth and one by adoption)

- Hon. Anthony Mackay (born 1967)
- Hon. Shane Mackay (born 1973)
- Hon. Ivan Mackay (born 1976), owner of the Brux estate, Aberdeenshire.

In 1969, The Countess of Inchcape became Lloyd's of London's first female Name.

Peerage of the United Kingdom
Preceded by Kenneth Mackay	Earl of Inchcape; 1939 – 1994	Succeeded by Peter Mackay
