= Molony baronets =

Baronetcy in the Baronetage of the United Kingdom

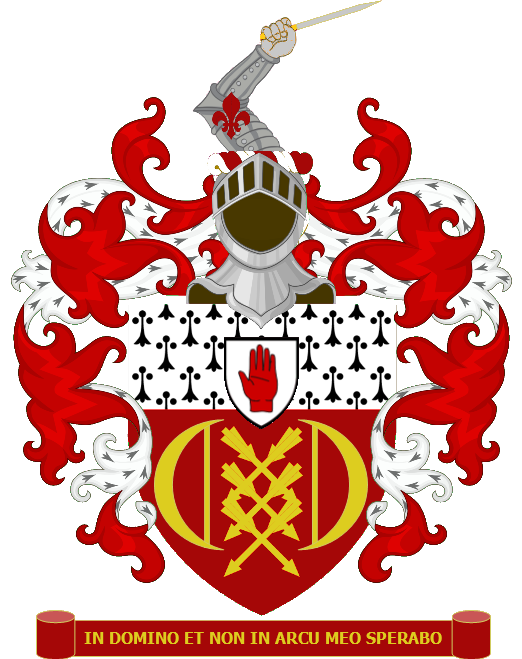
- Crest: A dexter arm embowed in armour Proper charged with a fleur-de-lis Gules the hand in a gauntlet holding a sword of the first.
- Motto: In Domino Et Non In Arcu Meo Sperabo

The Molony Baronetcy, of the City of Dublin, is a title in the Baronetage of the United Kingdom. It was created on 21 January 1925 for Thomas Molony, the former Lord Chief Justice of Ireland.

== Molony baronets, of the City of Dublin (1925) ==
- Sir Thomas Francis Molony, 1st Baronet (1865–1949)
- Sir Hugh Francis Molony, 2nd Baronet (1900–1976)
- Sir (Thomas) Desmond Molony, 3rd Baronet (1937–2014)
- Sir Peter John Molony, 4th Baronet (1937–2019)
- Sir John Benjamin Molony, 5th Baronet (1966-)

The heir apparent to the baronetcy is the current holder's (Sir John Benjamin Molony) son, Joseph Sebastian Molony (2006-).
