= Glenapp Castle =

Luxury hotel, South Ayrshire, Scotland

Coordinates: 55.08411°N 4.98848°W

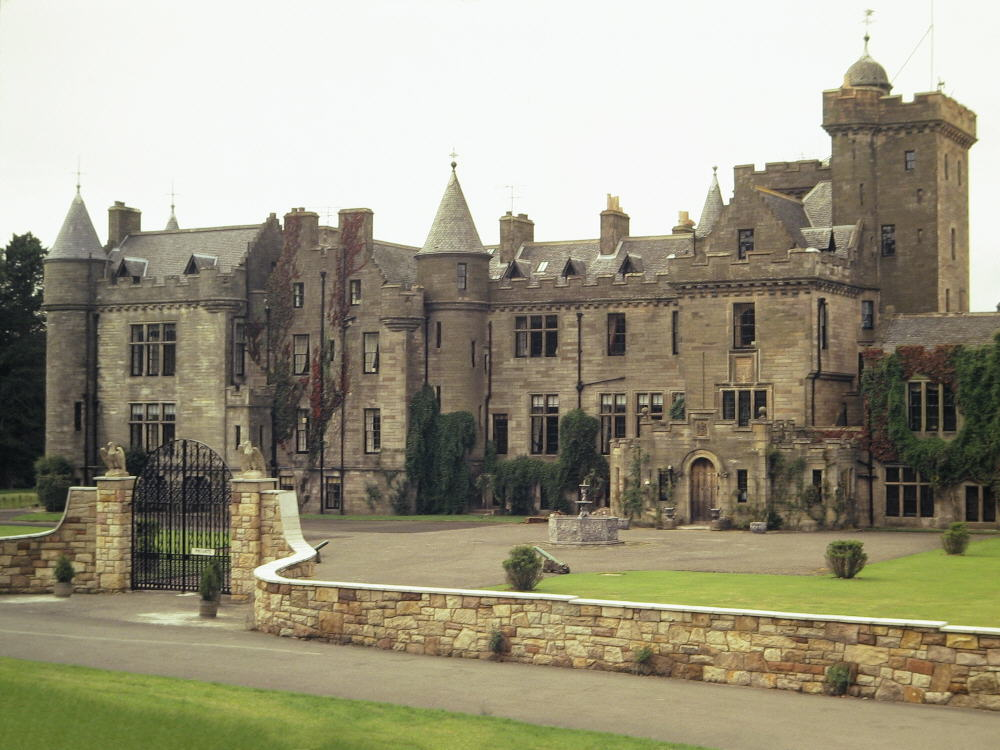
- Interactive map of the Glenapp Castle area

General information
- Location: Ballantrae, South Ayrshire, KA26 0NZ, Scotland, Ballantrae, South Ayrshire, Scotland
- Opening: 1870 (hotel: 2000)
- Owner: Paul and Poppy Szkiler

Design and construction
- Developer: David Bryce

Other information
- Number of rooms: 17 bedrooms/suites (73 room castle)

Website
- www.glenappcastle.com

Inventory of Gardens and Designed Landscapes in Scotland
- Official name: Glenapp
- Designated: 1 July 1987
- Reference no.: GDL00192

Glenapp Castle, formerly the family seat of the Earl of Inchcape, is now a luxury hotel and restaurant located about 1 1/2 miles (2.5 kilometres) southeast of Ballantrae, South Ayrshire, Scotland.

== History ==
The castle was built for the Deputy Lord Lieutenant of the County, James Hunter. It has no older origin. Designed by the famous Scottish architect David Bryce the Deputy Lord Lieutenant of Ayrshire at the time, the Castle was finished in 1870. It is a noteworthy example of the Scottish Baronial style of architecture The Inchcape family owned the castle from 1917 until the early 1980s. Pioneering aviator Elsie Mackay, daughter of the first Earl of Inchcape, lived at the castle until her untimely death in 1928 in an attempt to fly the Atlantic in a single engined Stinson Detroiter. The Castle opened as a hotel in 2000; entry to the castle and its grounds is only for guests with a room or restaurant reservation.

== Location ==
Glenapp Castle is near Ballantrae in South Ayrshire and overlooks several islands: Ailsa Craig, Arran and Mull of Kintyre. The site is also close to Galloway Forest Park, Mull of Galloway, Culzean Castle and several botanical gardens such as Logan Gardens, Castle Kennedy Gardens. The actual castle and its buildings are almost 1 mile (1.5 kilometres) from the electronically gated entrance.

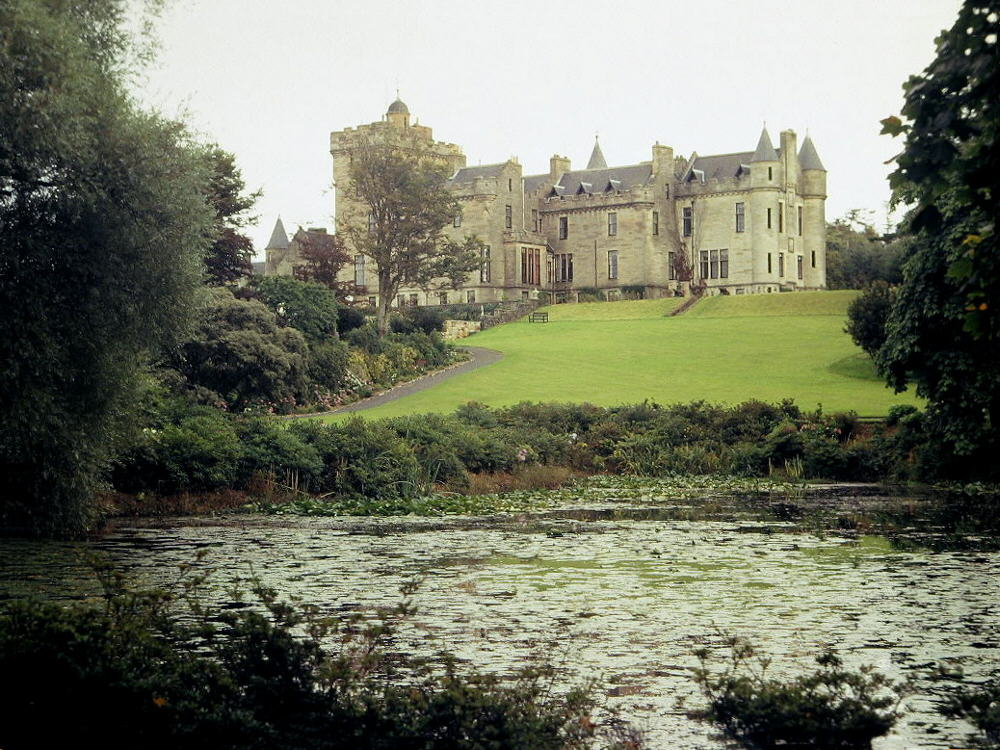
Glenapp Castle, north-west facade

== Media ==
In 2023, the hotel featured in BBC2's Amazing Hotels: Life Beyond the Lobby.

In 2025, Glenapp was featured on The Real Housewives of London as the location of a girls’ trip hosted by Juliet Mayhew, a cast member on the show and major shareholder in the castle.

== See also ==
- List of restaurants in Scotland
