= Ignatius O'Brien, 1st Baron Shandon =

Irish lawyer and politician

The Right Honourable The Lord Shandon PC (Ire)

Solicitor General for Ireland
- In office 1911–1912
- Preceded by: Charles Andrew O'Connor
- Succeeded by: Thomas Molony

Attorney General for Ireland
- In office 1912–1913
- Preceded by: Charles Andrew O'Connor
- Succeeded by: Thomas Molony

Lord Chancellor of Ireland
- In office 1913–1918
- Preceded by: Redmond Barry
- Succeeded by: Sir James Campbell

Personal details
- Born: 31 July 1857 Cork, Ireland
- Died: 10 September 1930 (aged 73) London, England

Ignatius John O'Brien, 1st Baron Shandon, PC (Ire) (31 July 1857 – 10 September 1930), known as Sir Ignatius O'Brien, Bt, between 1916 and 1918, was an Irish lawyer and politician. He served as Lord Chancellor of Ireland between 1913 and 1918.

== Early life ==
O'Brien was born in Cork, the youngest son of Mark Joseph O'Brien and Jane, daughter of William Dunne. He was educated at the Vincentian School there and, at the age of 16, entered the Catholic University of Ireland in Dublin but left after two years due to family circumstances. O'Brien thought the university system was too biased towards the classics and took a lifelong interest in science and technical education. He worked as a junior reporter for the Saunders Newsletter, a Dublin Conservative daily newspaper and then for Freeman's Journal while studying part-time for the Bar. Called to the Irish Bar, King's Inn, in 1881, O'Brien was slow to build a practice and continued to support himself through freelance journalism, within three years he had established a small practice on the Munster circuit.

== Keller Case ==
In 1887 O'Brien became involved in the case of Canon Keller which was to establish his legal career and reputation. Keller, who was the parish priest of Youghal, was called to give evidence in the Bankruptcy Court regarding the financial circumstances of some of his Parishioners involved in the "Plan of Campaign" rent strikes. Keller refused to answer questions on the grounds that he had obtained this information in his capacity as a confessor, and that breaching the seal of the confessional contravened Catholic Canon law. As a result, Keller was imprisoned for contempt of court. O'Brien argued in support of a writ of habeas corpus. Although unsuccessful in the Court of Queen's Bench, his argument prevailed in the Irish Court of Appeal

== Later legal and political career ==
Propelled by the reputation he won in the Keller case, O'Brien gave up circuit court work and concentrated on Chancery and Bankruptcy matters and became a leading authority on bankruptcy law. He was called to the Inner Bar as an Irish Queen's Counsel in 1899, became a bencher of King's Inns in 1907 and was appointed Serjeant at Law (then the highest rank for an Irish barrister) in 1910. A supporter of Home Rule and the Liberal Party, O'Brien campaigned on behalf of Liberal candidates but did not stand for parliament himself. In 1911 he was appointed Solicitor General for Ireland in H. H. Asquith's Liberal administration and advanced to Attorney General in 1912, becoming a member of the Irish Privy Council in the same year. In this capacity, he prosecuted suffragettes who tried to set fire to the Dublin Theatre Royal, although he himself was personally in favour of women's suffrage.

In 1913 the office of Lord Chancellor of Ireland fell vacant and O'Brien, as Attorney General, was by a longstanding tradition entitled to claim the position. As a judge he was not highly regarded; his pompous manner in Court led to unkind comparison with a bullfrog; more seriously there were frequent complaints that his constant interruptions from the Bench made it almost impossible for counsel to present their cases properly.

== Lord Chancellor ==
O'Brien's tenure as Lord Chancellor was only secure as long as the Liberal Party remained in government at Westminster. In 1915 the Asquith Government was forced to resign and enter into a wartime coalition with the Conservative Party. British Conservatives, supported behind the scenes by T.M. Healy sought to replace O'Brien with his Unionist rival James Campbell. Out of consideration for Irish Nationalist opinion, O'Brien remained in office and was created a Baronet, of Ardtona in the Parish of Dundrum in the County of Dublin, in 1916. During the 1916 Easter Rising O'Brien drew up the formal proclamation of martial law issued by the Lord Lieutenant, Lord Wimborne. By 1918 however, Conservative and Unionist opinion was ascendant and O'Brien was replaced as Lord Chancellor by Campbell. He received a peerage as a consolation and became Baron Shandon, of the City of Cork.

== Later life ==
A constitutional nationalist who supported home rule without breaking the imperial link with Great Britain, O'Brien was opposed to the aims and methods of Sinn Féin. After an IRA raid on his home, he left Ireland for good, settling in the Isle of Wight. Although sceptical of the House of Lords, O'Brien found the peers agreeable and became reconciled with its largely hereditary nature. His participation in the House of Lords was usually limited to matters affecting Ireland or issues on which he had legal expertise. He took an active part in the debates and negotiations surrounding the Government of Ireland Act 1920.

In 1926–27 he wrote a memoir, which was published by Four Courts Press, Dublin in 2021.

== Marriage ==
Lord Shandon married Anne, daughter of John Talbot Scallan, a prominent Dublin solicitor, in 1886. She died in February 1929. Their marriage was childless so when O'Brien died in London the following year, aged 73, his peerage became extinct.

== Arms ==
Coat of arms of Ignatius O'Brien, 1st Baron Shandon
Notes Confirmed 10 May 1916 by George James Burtchaell, Deputy Ulster King of Arms. Crest Issuant from a cloud an arm embowed charged for distinction with an ermine spot the hand grasping a sword all Proper. Torse Of the colours. Escutcheon Gules three lions passant guardant in pale per pale Or and Argent a chief Ermine. Supporters Dexter an Irish elk salient reguardant Gules attired unguled and charged on the shoulder with a pheon Or sinister a lion rampant reguardant pean langyed and armed Gules charged on the shoulder with a trefoil slipped Vert. Motto Lamg Laidir An Nachtar

Legal offices
Preceded by Charles Andrew O'Connor	Solicitor General for Ireland; 1911–1912	Succeeded by Thomas Francis Molony
Preceded by Charles Andrew O'Connor	Attorney General for Ireland; 1912–1913	Succeeded by Thomas Francis Molony
Political offices
Preceded by Redmond Barry	Lord Chancellor of Ireland; 1913–1918	Succeeded by Sir James Campbell
Peerage of the United Kingdom
New creation	Baron Shandon; 1918–1930	Extinct
Baronetage of the United Kingdom
New creation	Baronet (of Ardtona); 1916–1930	Extinct
