= Charles O'Connor (judge) =

Irish judge

Judge of the Supreme Court
- In office 11 March 1924 – 2 June 1925
- Nominated by: Government of Ireland
- Appointed by: Tim Healy

Personal details
- Born: 31 December 1854 County Roscommon, Ireland
- Died: 18 October 1928 (aged 73) Dublin, Ireland
- Education: Trinity College Dublin; Middle Temple; King's Inns

Charles Andrew O'Connor, PC, PC(I), SL, KC (31 December 1854 – 18 October 1928) was an Irish judge who served as a Judge of the Supreme Court from 1924 to 1925. His judgment in a habeas corpus case of R. (Egan) v. Macready is still influential.

== Early life and education ==
Born on 31 December 1854, he was the third son of Charles Andrew O'Connor, solicitor, of Roscommon. His mother Catherine was the daughter of C. G. Smyth. O'Connor was educated at St Stanislaus College and then at Trinity College Dublin, graduating with a Bachelor of Arts in 1876, and in 1877, he was elected Auditor of the College Historical Society. In 1876, he was admitted to the Middle Temple and two years later he was called to the Irish Bar. In 1890, he obtained his Master of Arts.

== Legal career ==
O'Connor was appointed a Queen's Counsel in 1894 and was chosen a bencher after two years. He was appointed First Serjeant in 1907 and became Solicitor-General for Ireland two years later. In 1911, he took over as Attorney-General for Ireland, on which occasion he was sworn of the Privy Council of Ireland. In the following year, he succeeded as Master of the Rolls in Ireland, which he held until the establishment of the Irish Free State in 1922. O'Connor retained the position in the new state for the next two years until its abolition in 1924.

== Judicial career ==
He received an appointment as a judge of the Supreme Court of the Irish Free State, retiring after one year in 1925. He was one of only two judges of the old regime who were thought worth retaining by the new Irish Government, which acted on the advice of Hugh Kennedy, the first Chief Justice of Ireland, who believed that O'Connor had demonstrated his integrity and independence of mind in the Egan case (below).

== Notable judgments ==
Although his training had been in Chancery, O'Connor is best remembered for two notable judgments in the field of habeas corpus, both a product of the political turmoil of the period 1919–1923. In R. (Egan) v. Macready, he found that the power to declare martial law imposed by the Restoration of Order in Ireland Act 1920 did not confer a power to impose the death penalty, and ordered the release of the applicant Egan, who was under sentence of death. When Nevil Macready, the Commander in Chief refused to comply, O'Connor caused a sensation by ordering his attachment for contempt of court. Egan was then released. The judgment was extremely influential, although one crucial finding that there is no limit to the number of habeas corpus applications which can be made by a single applicant has been much debated, and in Ireland itself was modified by the Second Amendment of the Constitution of Ireland.

His judgment in Application of Childers, is a striking contrast. Erskine Childers, one of the leaders of the Anti-Treaty side during the Irish Civil War, was captured by Government forces, court-martialled and sentenced to death in November 1922. O'Connor refused to interfere, finding that the formative Irish Free State, unlike General Macready, did have power to establish military courts that could impose the death penalty.

He summed up:

Now the Government is for the time being in a state of transition, we have what is called a Provisional Government pending the completion of the Constitution of the Irish Free State – but although the Government is only provisional it has been formally and legally set up, and its authority cannot be questioned. It derives its validity from the Treaty between Great Britain and Ireland and the Act of Parliament confirming it. … The Provisional Government is now de jure as well as de facto – the ruling authority bound to administer, to preserve the peace and to repress by force, if necessary, all persons who seek by violence to overthrow it … He [Mr. Childers] disputes the authority of the Tribunal and comes to this Civil Court for protection, but its answer must be that its jurisdiction is ousted by the State of War which he himself has helped to produce. However, doubtful the law may have been in the past it is now clearly established that once a state of war has arisen the Civil Courts have no jurisdiction over the acts of the military authorities, during the continuance of hostilities.

While O'Connor was universally regarded as a man of integrity, who would never consciously bend the law, it is possible that his attitude had hardened since Egan; certainly it cannot have helped Childers that his allies had destroyed the Four Courts, a fact to which O'Connor drew attention in stressing the magnitude of the problems which the new Government faced. Childers appealed, but before this could be heard, he was executed three days later.

== Personal life ==
In 1890, O'Connor married Blanche, the daughter of James Scully. He died in 1928.

== Character ==
Maurice Healy praised O'Connor as "the greatest gentleman at the Irish Bar" and an extremely popular judge, even if he did not fully live up to expectations. O'Connor was modest about his own abilities, noting in Egan that if he differed from colleagues with more experience of criminal law, it was not because he thought himself in any way superior to them. His main personal foible is said by Healy to have been his pride in belonging to the Clan O'Connor and a tendency to bore listeners with its history.

== Notes ==
Legal offices
Preceded by Redmond Barry	Solicitor-General for Ireland; 1909–1911	Succeeded by Ignatius O'Brien
Preceded by Redmond Barry	Attorney-General for Ireland; 1911–1913	Succeeded by Ignatius O'Brien
Preceded by Richard Edmund Meredith	Master of the Rolls in Ireland; 1912–1924	Office abolished
