= Thomas Molony =

The Right Honourable Sir Thomas Molony Bt, PC(Ire), KC
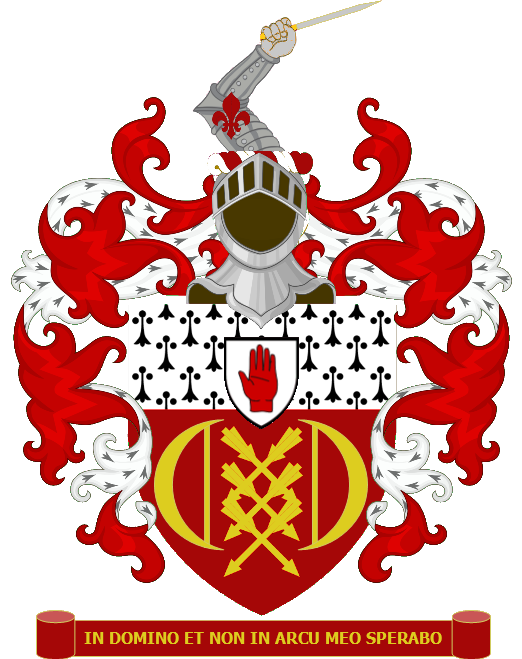

Lord Chief Justice of Ireland
- In office 1918–1924
- Preceded by: James Campbell
- Succeeded by: Office Abolished

Solicitor-General for Ireland
- In office 1912–1913
- Monarch: George V
- Preceded by: Ignatius O'Brien, 1st Baron Shandon
- Succeeded by: John Moriarty

Personal details
- Born: 1865
- Died: 1949 (aged 83–84)
- Spouse: Pauline Rispin
- Children: 6, including Joseph

Sir Thomas Francis Molony, 1st Baronet, PC(Ire), KC (1865–1949) was the last Lord Chief Justice of Ireland. He was also the only judge to hold the position of Lord Chief Justice of Southern Ireland although he did not hold that position under that title.

== Early career and politics ==
Molony qualified as a barrister in 1887 and became a Queen's Counsel in 1899. He served as Solicitor-General for Ireland (24 June 1912 to 10 April 1913) when he was appointed Attorney General for Ireland (10 April 1913 to 20 June 1913). Later in 1913, Molony was made a judge of the High Court for Ireland and from 1915 sat as a judge of the Court of Appeal for Ireland. He was also appointed to several governmental inquiries, notably one on certain shootings including that of Francis Sheehy-Skeffington in the wake of the 1916 Irish Easter Rising.

In terms of his own politics, Molony has been described as “a Home Ruler of the old stamp". He was opposed to the partition of Ireland. When the Government of Ireland Act 1920 was being drafted he declined an invitation to travel to London to advise on proposals relating to the creation of a separate judiciary for what was to be Northern Ireland. In correspondence with government officials, he expressed his particular disappointment that unlike previous Home Rule Bills, it was now proposed that the Irish judiciary would be divided. He opined that this would impose unnecessary expense, lead to duplication of administrative expenses and that the proposals were “detrimental to the dignity and authority of the Bench...and would tend to...prolong the separation of the two parts of Ireland, which it is hoped ultimately to re-unite".

== Defending his title ==
Molony was appointed the Lord Chief Justice of Ireland in 1918 under Letters Patent from the King under the Great Seal of Ireland. At the time of his appointment, this was the second highest judicial posting in Ireland, second only to that of the Lord Chancellor of Ireland. However, Molony's position was shortly to be under attack. In 1920 the British Government began drafting Home Rule legislation which ultimately led later that year to the Government of Ireland Act. The draft legislation proposed that the Lord Chief Justice of Ireland would become the Lord Chief Justice of Southern Ireland. Molony “expressed disquiet at the apparent proposal to lessen the dignity and prerogatives of his own office". He sought the retention of the title of Lord Chief Justice of Ireland, at the very least for as long as he still held that post personally. In a letter to the Chief Secretary for Ireland, Molony sought an amendment to the legislation to insert a clause to provide that "nothing in the legislation shall affect the rank, title or precedence of the existing Lord Chief Justice of Ireland" (i.e. Molony). The Chief Secretary responded to the effect that it would be anomalous for there to be a Lord Chief Justice of Ireland and a Lord Chief Justice of Northern Ireland. Molony countered this by pointing to one such anomaly that was universally accepted:

"The Primacy of Ireland was claimed by the Archbishop of Armagh as successor of St Patrick, and by the Archbishop of Dublin as Prelate of the Metropolitan See...[A] sagacious Pope decided the Archbishop of Dublin should be Primate of Ireland, and the Archbishop of Armagh Primate of all Ireland...Similarly you may make any number of Chief Justices of Northern Ireland you like, provided you leave me with the title I hold."

Molony corresponded with a number of other prominent members of the British administration including Edward Shortt, the Home Secretary. He argued that the withdrawal of his title was "unconstitutional and unjust" and that his option to retire was no answer at a time when his "retirement would certainly be regarded as a triumph for the forces of disorder". Later, in October, Molony travelled to London to address a Cabinet Committee on the matter but this was not a success and Molony bemoaned how little interest in Irish affairs was taken by the government. As the Government of Ireland Bill left the House of Commons in November 1920, Molony sought the support of a number of Law Lords. Finally, the government compromised on the matter: An amendment to the effect that the Lord Chief Justice of Ireland would if he consented become the first Lord Chief Justice of Southern Ireland but would keep his title and rank (as well as certain non-judicial offices) was accepted.

The exact provision in the Government of Ireland Act 1920 under which Molony personally retained his title was under Part III(1) of the Seventh Schedule which provided that:

All the existing judges ... shall...be transferred to and become judges holding corresponding offices in the Supreme Court of Southern Ireland [p]rovided that ... the existing Lord Chief Justice of Ireland, if he becomes Lord Chief Justice of Southern Ireland, shall, so long as he holds that office, be entitled to retain the rank and title of Lord Chief Justice of Ireland, and to exercise any jurisdiction in respect of and on behalf of His Majesty as a visitor to any college or other charitable foundation exerciseable by him on the appointed day.

== Highest judge in the land ==
On 6 December 1922 (i.e. the day the Irish Free State came into being), the position of Lord Chancellor of Ireland was abolished. The leadership of the judiciary in the emerging Irish Free State now fell to Molony. That same year, the Irish Civil War began. The Four Courts were burnt down. It was not an easy time to be a judge with violence raging and a new Irish government coming into power whose members had themselves shortly before been rebels. Molony made an effective and dignified attempt to proceed with business as usual and uphold the laws of the land.

Molony adopted a tough stance. The penalty of capital punishment was regularly handed down by his judiciary during the Irish Civil War. Indeed, even after that War, Molony handed down more death sentences than would have been usual in peacetime – four such sentences were handed down in the four weeks towards the end of 1923, two on the same day, 12 December.

One of the more notable events of his judicial leadership was that he administered the Oath of Office to the first Governor-General of the Irish Free State, Tim Healy.

He was president of the Statistical and Social Inquiry Society of Ireland between 1920 and 1924.

== Retirement ==
In May 1924, together with most other members of the Irish judiciary associated with the ancien régime, Molony retired as the Irish government established its own court system under the Courts of Justice Act 1924. The office of Lord Chief Justice of Ireland and indeed of Lord Chief Justice of Southern Ireland were abolished. His successor as leader of the judiciary was the first Chief Justice of the Irish Free State, Hugh Kennedy. Molony had an audience with the King on 14 July 1924 upon relinquishing his appointment as Lord Chief Justice of Ireland. He was created a Baronet, of the City of Dublin, in the 1925 New Year Honours.

Molony retired to England but was made Vice-Chancellor of Trinity College Dublin in 1931. Molony died on 3 September 1949 and is buried in Gap Road Cemetery Wimbledon.

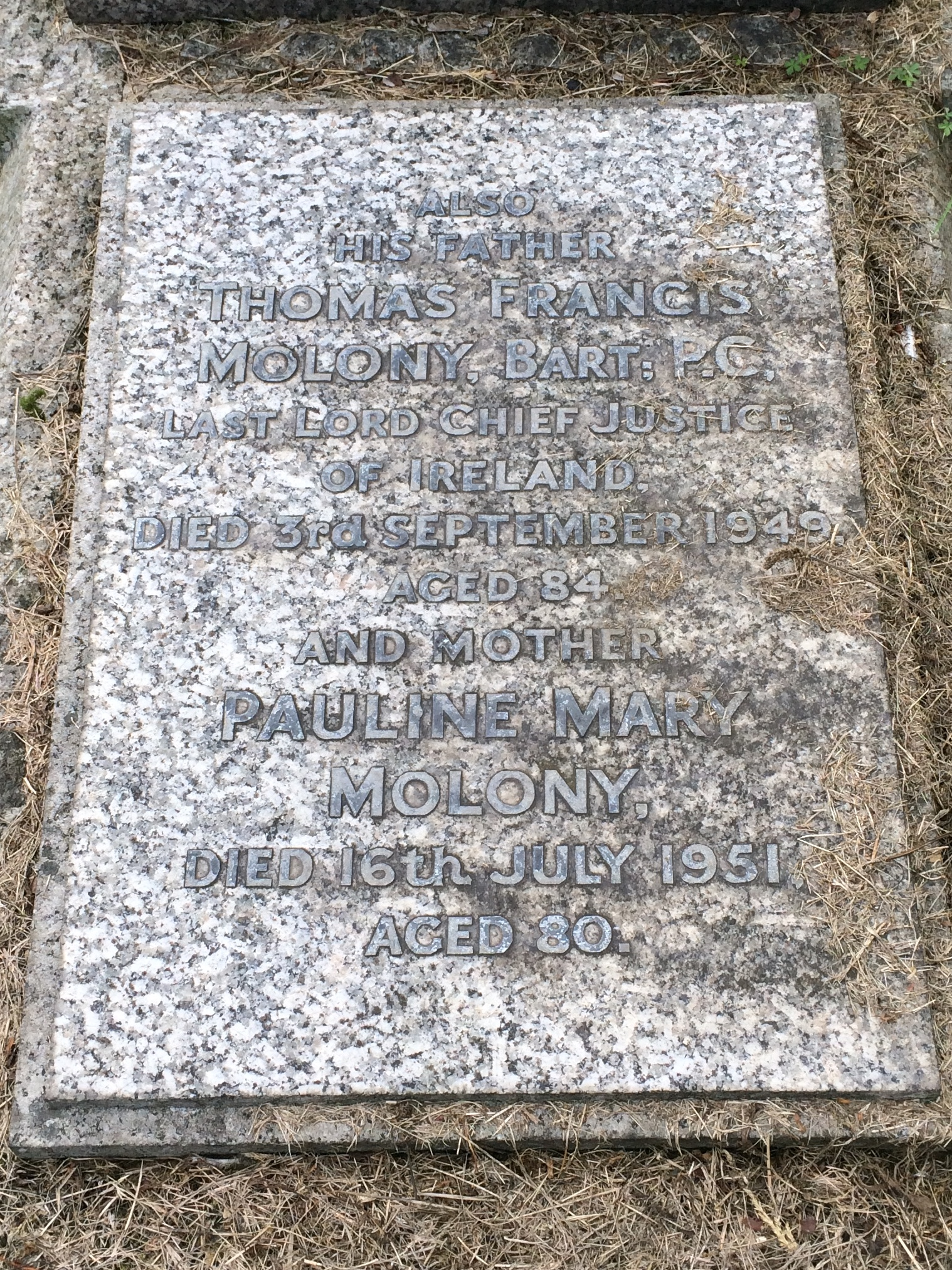
Sir Thomas Molony's grave

His family consisted of his wife Pauline, only daughter of Mr. Bernard Rispin, of Dublin, and three sons and three daughters. His eldest son, Hugh Francis Molony, born in 1900, was a graduate in engineering of Trinity College Dublin and succeeded his father to the baronetcy. His second son, Sir Joseph Molony, was a noted barrister.

== Coat-of-arms ==
Coat of arms of Thomas Molony

Notes
Granted 8 December 1925 by Sir Nevile Rodwell Wilkinson, Ulster King of Arms.
Crest
A dexter arm embowed in armour Proper charged with a fleur-de-lis Gules the hand in a gauntlet holding a sword of the first.
Escutcheon
Gules six arrows in saltire between two bows erect to dexter and sinister Or a chief Ermine.
Motto
In Domino Et Non In Arcu Meo Sperabo

== See also ==
- Lord Chief Justice of Northern Ireland
- Chief Justice of Ireland

Legal offices
Preceded by Ignatius O'Brien	Solicitor-General for Ireland; 1912–1913	Succeeded by John Moriarty
Preceded by Ignatius O'Brien	Attorney-General for Ireland; April–June 1913	Succeeded by John Moriarty
Preceded by James Campbell	Lord Chief Justice of Ireland; 1918–1924	Office abolished
Baronetage of the United Kingdom
New title	Baronet (of the City of Dublin); 1925–1949	Succeeded by Sir Hugh Francis Molony
