= Jerry Buhlmann =

British businessman (born 1959)

Jerry Buhlmann (born 26 November 1959) is a British businessman who is Chairman of Inchcape plc, Chairman of Dept BV, Chairman of Precisify, a member of the Supervisory Board of Serviceplan GmbH, Special Advisor to Croud Limited, and previously CEO Aegis Group. He was also the chief executive officer of Dentsu Aegis Network.

== Early life ==
Jerry Buhlmann was born in London on 26 November 1959. He was educated at Whitgift School in Croydon.

== Career ==
Buhlmann started his career in advertising in the 1980s at Young & Rubicam and WCRS. In 1989, he was one of three founders of BBJ, a specialist media agency in the UK, building the business until it was acquired by Aegis Group PLC in 1999. From 2000, Jerry held a number of senior positions within Aegis Group PLC until 2010 when he was appointed Chief Executive. Following the merger of Aegis Group PLC with Dentsu Inc. in 2013, Jerry was appointed CEO of Dentsu Aegis Network. Jerry stepped down from the position of Chief Executive at the end of 2018 after nine years.

Buhlmann currently holds the following positions:

Non-executive Director, then Senior Independent Director, then Chairman for Inchcape PLC (since 2017).

Chairman of Dept – an international digital agency (since April 2022).

Chairman of Precisify.

Chairman then Special Advisor to Croud Limited – a private equity funded digital marketing agency (since January 2020).

Supervisory Board Member of Serviceplan Group, a Munich based international advertising agency group, (since October 2021) | https://www.serviceplan.com/en/news/new-supervisory-board-member.html

== Personal life ==
Buhlmann lives between London and Surrey and has three children.
