= Jonathan Pim (1858–1949) =

Irish lawyer, judge and politician (1858–1949)

Jonathan Ernest Pim PC (I), KC (1858–1949), was an Irish Quaker lawyer and judge, and Liberal politician.

He was born in Dublin, eldest son of Thomas Pim of Greenbank; of the Dublin branch of the celebrated Quaker family which co-founded the town of Mountmellick. His grandfather, also called Jonathan Pim, served as an MP for Dublin City between 1865 and 1874. He graduated from Trinity College Dublin in 1881 and entered Gray's Inn in 1882. He was called to the Irish Bar in 1886, and became a King's Counsel in 1909.

Pim served in the Liberal administration of H. H. Asquith as Solicitor-General for Ireland from 1913 to 1914. The latter year he was sworn of the Privy Council of Ireland and promoted to Attorney-General for Ireland, a position he held until 1915, when he was appointed a justice of the King's Bench Division of the High Court of Justice in Ireland. After the Easter Rising of 1916, he was briefly appointed a Lord Justice of Ireland, charged with emergency powers of government.

After the establishment of the Irish Free State, like nearly all the pre-independence judges, he was required to retire under the Courts of Justice Act 1924. He was a member of the Royal Irish Academy.

Maurice Healy in his memoir The Old Munster Circuit suggests that Pim's retirement probably came as a relief to him, since despite his great charm, courtesy and erudition he was not a lawyer of adequate calibre for any of the offices he filled, and he had not expected to be appointed to any more senior office than a county court judge.

Pim died in 1949.

Legal offices
Preceded by John Francis Moriarty	Solicitor-General for Ireland; 1913–1914	Succeeded by James O'Connor
Preceded by John Francis Moriarty	Attorney-General for Ireland; 1914–1915	Succeeded by John Gordon
