= Simon Mackay, Baron Tanlaw =

British peer (born 1934)

The Right Honourable The Lord Tanlaw

Member of the House of Lords
- Lord Temporal
- Life peerage 21 May 1971 – 3 November 2017

Personal details
- Born: Simon Brooke Mackay; 30 March 1934 (age 92)
- Party: Liberal; Crossbench; Conservative
- Children: 6; including Asia

Simon Brooke Mackay, Baron Tanlaw (born 30 March 1934), is a former member of the House of Lords. He is the senior life peer.

== Family and business interests ==
Tanlaw is the fourth son of Kenneth Mackay, 2nd Earl of Inchcape. His mother, the 2nd Earl's second wife, was Leonora Margaret Brooke, daughter of Sir Charles Vyner Brooke, the final White Rajah of Sarawak, and his wife the Ranee Sylvia.

Simon Mackay was educated at Eton College and Trinity College, Cambridge. He served as second lieutenant with the 12th Royal Lancers in Malaya between 1952 and 1954. He married Joanna Susan Hirsch in 1959 and they had two sons, James Brooke and Joshua Alexander, and two daughters, Iona Heloise and Rebecca Alexandra. Mackay and Hirsch later divorced.

He married his second wife, Malaysian (Lady Tanlaw) Rina Siew Yong, in 1974. They have a son, The Hon Brooke Brooke Mackay, and a daughter, Asia Brooke who is married to Andrew Trotter, founder and CEO of Global lingo, a multinational translation company. Tanlaw has eight grandchildren.

Tanlaw takes a particular interest in the Far East, in particular Malaysia. He was a director of the family firm, Inchcape plc, with many business interests in the region from 1967 to the mid-1990s, at which point Mackay family involvement in the company ceased. The business was subsequently restructured into an automotive only company. Tanlaw currently owns Fandstan Electric Group Ltd, a railway and engineering company.

In the Sunday Times Rich List 2012, Tanlaw and his family were ranked equal 63rd in Scotland, with an estimated fortune of £85 million.

Lord Tanlaw was the Chancellor of the University of Buckingham. He was appointed in April 2010, in succession to Sir Martin Jacomb, before stepping down in 2013, when he was succeeded by The Hon. Lady Keswick. Tanlaw has served as both president and treasurer of the Sarawak Association and is a member of the Oriental Club, London and White's, London. He was a member of the executive committee of the Great Britain-China Centre between 1981 and 1988.

== Political life ==
Simon Mackay was the unsuccessful Liberal candidate for Galloway in 1959, and by the late 1960s was joint Treasurer of the Scottish Liberal Party. He was created a life peer on 21 May 1971 as Baron Tanlaw, of Tanlawhill in the County of Dumfries.

Lord Tanlaw sat in the House of Lords as a Conservative after many years as a crossbencher. He attended the chamber and voted regularly, and took a particular interest in debates concerning energy conservation, global warming and the environment. He retired from the House on 3 November 2017.

=== Lighter Evenings Bill ===
A keen amateur horologist, Lord Tanlaw is a Fellow of both the Royal Astronomical Society and the British Horological Institute. In 2005, he introduced the Lighter Evenings (Experiment) Bill, which would move the United Kingdom's time zone forward by one hour, to UTC+1 in the winter and UTC+2 in the summer, for a trial period of three years. Lord Tanlaw claims that this would reduce accidents in the winter as the evenings would be lighter, and has the backing of the Royal Society for the Prevention of Accidents. Opponents fear that it would have an adverse effect on people living in Scotland and northern England, where the mornings would be much darker. A similar experiment, known as British Standard Time, was trialled between 1968 and 1971 before being abandoned. The bill had its second reading in the House of Lords on 24 March 2006. The government had already rejected the proposal the previous year.

Lord Tanlaw persists in pressing his case for a change of time zone. Most of his last appearances in the House of Lords were to argue for lighter evenings, which he did when there was only the most tenuous link to the topic being debated in the chamber. Such did his reputation become that other Lords were able to predict when the issue was to be raised by Lord Tanlaw's appearance in his usual seat on the cross-benches.

== Arms ==
Coat of arms of Simon Mackay, Baron Tanlaw
Crest A Falcon proper hooded Gules issuant out of a five pointed Eastern Crown Or Escutcheon Per chevron Azure and Argent in chief two Lymphads of the second and in base a Tiger's Face affrontee proper on a Chief Or a Cross engrailed per cross indented Azure and Sable Supporters Dexter: a Prejevalski's Mare proper; Sinister: a Roe Deer also proper Motto Pro Vita Vivo (I live for life)

Academic offices
Preceded by Sir Martin Jacomb	Chancellor of the University of Buckingham; 2010–2013	Followed by The Lady Keswick
Honorary titles
Preceded by The Baroness Masham of Ilton	Senior life peer 2023–present	Incumbent
Orders of precedence in the United Kingdom
Preceded by The Lord Margadale	Gentlemen; Baron Tanlaw	Followed by The Lord Vinson
