= John Moriarty (Attorney General) =

Irish lawyer & judge (1855–1915)

John Francis Moriarty PC, QC (1855 – 2 May 1915) was an Irish lawyer and judge.

== Background and education ==
Moriarty was born in Mallow, County Cork, the second son of John Moriarty, a successful solicitor of the town, and his wife Ellen O'Connell. He was educated at Stonyhurst College, where he and his brother Michael were classmates of Arthur Conan Doyle, and Trinity College Dublin. He entered Middle Temple in 1875, and was called to the Irish Bar in 1877.

== Family ==
He married firstly Katherine Beatrice Kavanagh (1859–1898) and secondly Mabel Dolphin. By Katherine he had eight children:

- Frances Caroline Joan Moriarty (1896–1933), who married in 1915, as his first wife, Kenneth Mackay, 2nd Earl of Inchcape, by whom she had four children, including Kenneth James William Mackay, 3rd Earl of Inchcape. They divorced in 1931.
- Marguerite
- Ellen
- Kathleen
- Michael
- Samuel
- Daniel
- Shannon

Joan Denise Moriarty (1910?–1992), the well-known ballet dancer, dance teacher and musician, was his niece, the daughter of his brother Michael and Marion McCarthy.

== Legal and judicial career ==
Moriarty became Queen's Counsel in 1900, Third Serjeant in 1909 and First Serjeant in 1910. Despite his flourishing legal practice, he was often in financial difficulties, and he went bankrupt in the 1890s. Although he supported the Liberals, unlike many barristers he did not regard party politics as a path to career advancement and showed little interest in acquiring a seat in the House of Commons. He did contemplate standing as member for Mallow in 1883. In 1913 he was appointed Solicitor-General for Ireland, then Attorney-General for Ireland. In 1914 he was made a Lord Justice of the Court of Appeal in Ireland but served less than two years before dying suddenly in May 1915 at Droitwich while on a visit to England. His death was widely reported abroad, and was commented on by The New York Times.

== Reputation ==
Maurice Healy in his popular memoir The Old Munster Circuit gives a vivid portrait of Moriarty as an exceptionally able and flamboyant barrister who was utterly unscrupulous in the tactics he used in conducting a case and was equally unscrupulous in his financial dealings. In Healy's opinion, "he seemed to prefer to lose a case by a trick than win it by fair means".

This picture may well be exaggerated; Healy himself admits that Moriarty was a fine Law Officer during a period of acute political tension, when he had to deal with the Dublin Lock-out and the formation of the Irish Volunteers.

The view of Moriarty given by Serjeant Sullivan in his memoirs, if not as severe as Healy's, is very similar; he recalled an occasion where the Irish Court of Appeal was driven to calling Moriarty "a disgrace to the profession". Sullivan thought that Moriarty, had he lived longer, would have been an outstanding judge, and this view seems to be borne out by his few reported decisions.

The suggestion that he was the inspiration for Professor Moriarty, the sworn enemy of Sherlock Holmes, may seem fanciful, but it is certainly an interesting coincidence that he was at school at Stonyhurst with Holmes' creator Conan Doyle.

While his great skill was cross-examination – he was perhaps the most feared opposing counsel of his day – Moriarty was also a fine lawyer, as demonstrated by his learned argument in Ussher v. Ussher (1912) on whether a marriage conducted according to the Roman Catholic rite is valid in the absence of a second witness. Even Healy admits that "he was an advocate of amazing ability". He was a tall man of intimidating presence, which he used to full effect in court, and affected a monocle.

=== National Bank v Silke ===
The report of a lawsuit in which Moriarty was a major figure, National Bank v Silke, certainly raises questions about his financial probity, since it contains an uncontradicted statement by the defendant that Moriarty induced him to sign a cheque through a fraudulent misrepresentation. On the other hand, Maurice Healy, despite his very low opinion of Moriarty, points out fairly that he was not a party to the action and therefore had no opportunity to defend himself against the charge of fraud.

Political offices
Preceded by Thomas Molony	Solicitor-General for Ireland; April–June 1913	Succeeded by Jonathan Pim
Preceded by Thomas Molony	Attorney-General for Ireland; 1913–1914	Succeeded by Jonathan Pim
