= Inchcape plc =

U.K. automotive company

- Type: Public limited company
- Traded as: LSE: INCH; FTSE 250 component
- ISIN: GB00B61TVQ02
- Industry: Automotive
- Founded: 1847 (as Mackinnon Mackenzie Company)
- Headquarters: London, England
- Key people: Jerry Buhlmann (Non-executive chairman); Duncan Tait (Group CEO)
- Revenue: ▼£9,100 million (2025)
- Operating income: ▼£529 million (2025)
- Net income: ▼£273 million (2025)
- Number of employees: 16,000 (2026)
- Website: www.inchcape.com

Inchcape plc is a British multinational automotive distribution company headquartered in London, England. An outgrowth of Calcutta-based Mackinnon Mackenzie Company, Inchcape has operations in 38 countries across the world. Inchcape is listed on the London Stock Exchange and is a constituent of the FTSE 250 Index.

== History ==
=== 1847–1950 ===
In 1847, William Mackinnon and Robert Mackenzie formed the Mackinnon Mackenzie Company (MMC), a general merchanting partnership based in Calcutta. In 1856, Mackinnon formed the Calcutta and Burma Steam Navigation Company to carry post to the region: the Company appointed MMC as its agent and secured contracts to transport British troops from Ceylon to India during the Indian Rebellion of 1857. It was floated on the London Stock Exchange in 1862 under the name British India Steam Navigation Company.

In 1874, James Lyle MacKay joined Mackinnon and Mackenzie in Calcutta and, by 1914, was the sole surviving senior partner in MMC. Largely responsible for solving India's currency problems and for the adoption of the Gold Standard, he was given a peerage by King George V for his services to industry in 1911. He chose the title "Baron Inchcape, of Strathnaver in the County of Sutherland", after the Inchcape Rock, which lies off Strathnaver and Arbroath (his birthplace) in Scotland, a prominent landmark that he had known well from sailing on voyages with his shipmaster father. Lord Inchcape was later created The 1st Viscount Inchcape in 1924, and was further advanced in the Peerage of the United Kingdom as The 1st Earl of Inchcape in 1929.

=== 1950–1990 ===
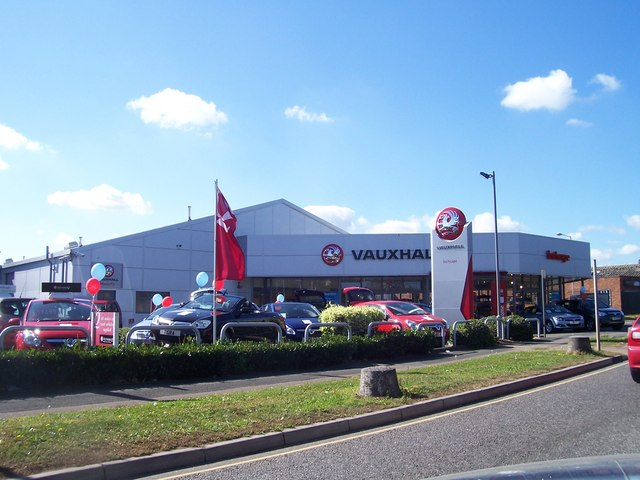
An Inchcape dealership in Exeter

By the 1950s, the Inchcape family had diverse interests around the world. This period brought new legislation and tax laws and, under The 3rd Earl of Inchcape, the family's many interests, including MMC, were consolidated into Inchcape and Company. In August 1958, Inchcape and Company became a public company and offered twenty five per cent of its equity for sale on the London Stock Exchange.

Throughout this period, Inchcape's growth came largely as a result of a series of mergers and acquisitions. During 1967, it merged with Borneo Company Limited, which almost doubled the company's size via the addition of operations in Hong Kong, Malaysia, Canada, Singapore, Brunei and Thailand to the operation. In 1971, Millars of Western Australia was purchased for $5 million.

In 1972, Dodwell & Company was acquired, which added extensive shipping, motors and business-machine trading across the Far East; it was during this era that Inchcape pivoted away from its traditional focus on India toward opportunities across the Far East. Dodwell & Company gave Inchcape further interests in this region, which it maintained as quasi-independent companies, rather than forming one large entity. Dodwell & Company was founded in Shanghai in 1858, and by the 1970s had established extensive businesses in shipping, motors and business-machine trading in Hong Kong, Japan and many other Far Eastern ports and cities.

Mann Egerton, acquired in 1973, laid the foundations for Inchcape's motor-distribution business. Founded at the end of the 19th century in Norwich by an electrical engineer and an early motoring pioneer, Mann Egerton sold cars manufactured by De Dion-Bouton, Renault and Daimler at the turn of the century, initially from branches in the eastern counties of England. By the 1970s, Mann Egerton distributed British Leyland cars, as well as an extensive range of luxury cars. Inchcape bought Joska Bourgeois's Japanese car distribution business, the International Motor Company, for £14.6 million in 1979.

Reincorporated as Inchcape plc in 1981, the company acquired several petrol, textile, electronic and mineral testing and inspection companies during the 1980s and formed a specific testing business division. The testing division continued to grow into the 1990s via the acquisition of the Caleb Brett group, SEMKO and various others entities, such as ETL Testing Laboratories.

By 1989, the motors division of Inchcape was contributing two-thirds of group turnover and 53.6 percent of group profits, the greater part contributed by Toyota. Between 1980 and 1989, Inchcape had generated an average post-tax return on net capital employed of 12.9 per cent.

=== 1990–2000 ===
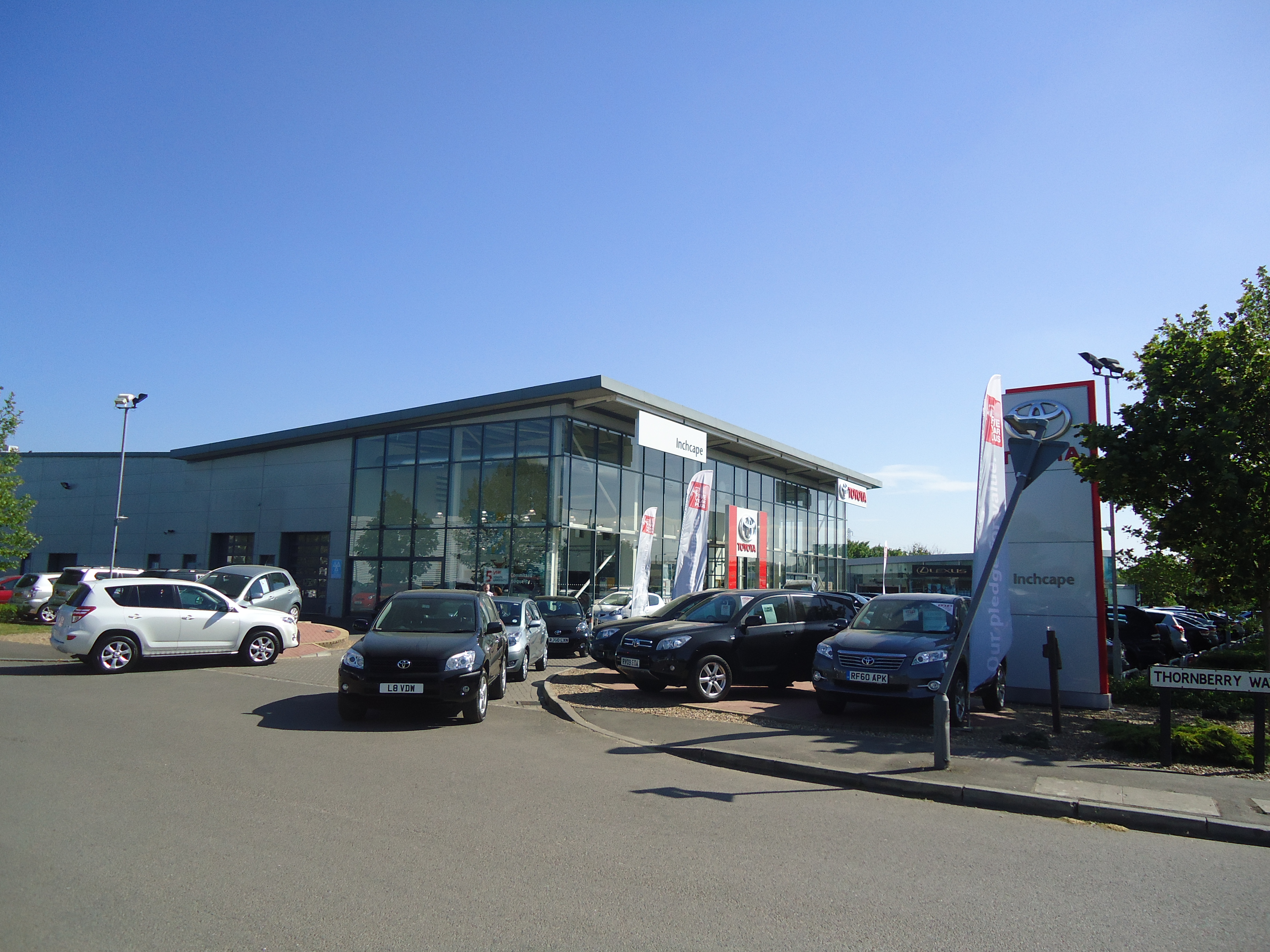
An Inchcape Toyota dealership in Guildford

Under the chairmanship of George Turnbull, Inchcape had reinforced in the 1980s its concentration on its core businesses. The key businesses at that time were organised into three main areas: services, marketing and distribution, and resources. The service businesses consisted of buying, insurance, inspection and testing, and shipping. The marketing and distribution businesses covered business machines, consumer and industrial services, and motors. The resource-based businesses was dominated by tea and timber. In 1991, Inchcape sold its tea interests while its timber business (which had operated in Malaysia, Indonesia, Papua New Guinea, Singapore and Hong Kong) followed two years later, ending its present in the commodities market in 1993.

A combination of factors plunged Inchcape into its two most difficult years ever, 1994 and 1995. Difficult economic conditions in some of the company's key markets – particularly in Western Europe and Hong Kong – dampened consumer spending, while the strength of the yen made Inchcape's Japanese products, notably the Toyota motor vehicles, less attractive than those of competitors based outside Japan. In certain areas, such as marketing, Inchcape had also become a more bureaucratic organisation than in the past, and had allegedly lost touch with some of the local markets it served. Furthermore, there was a growing perception amongst investors around this time that conglomerates were undesirable - Inchcape's management explicitly named this preference as having negatively impacted the company's valuation.

During 1995, a new management team was brought in. It was promptly determined that Inchcape ought to focus on its core international distribution businesses to turn things around and began making significant business divestments. This included the sale of the Bain Hogg insurance brokerage subsidiary (formed by the merger of Inchcape's brokerage operation with Bain Clarkson, and the Hogg Group in 1994 and ranked the eleventh largest broker in the world in 1995) to the Anglo-American business Aon Corporation in exchange for £160 million in October 1996. The terms of indemnity associated with this purchase were subsequently a subject of legal action between Aon and Inchcape. Separately, the testing service division was subject to a management buyout, financed by Charterhouse Development Capital, and renamed Intertek Testing Services.

In March 1998, motivated by the Asian financial crisis, Inchcape announced that it would focus exclusively on worldwide car distribution, the most successful part of the group. One of the first major sectors to be divested was the company's Russian soft-drink bottling business; Inchcape sold that part of their operations to The Coca-Cola Company in exchange for US$87 million in August 1998. Inchcape's global shipping business, Inchcape Shipping Services, was spun out and sold to the private equity firm Electra Fleming in March 1999. The sales of bottling businesses in South America, marketing services in Asia and the Middle East, and the Asia-Pacific Office Automation business were some of the wide range of divestments that quickly followed. In July 1999, the newly motors-centric Inchcape was officially created. Later that same year, Inchcape ended its import and distribution activities for both Chrysler and Jeep.

=== 2000–present ===
Previous logo

In June 2000, Peter Johnson became chief executive officer. The economic recovery in the Far East helped restore profits, as did the sale of Inchcape's forty nine per cent stake in Toyota GB to Toyota in 2000. In 2006, André Lacroix took over as CEO, and in 2007, Inchcape acquired European Motor Holdings, a leading European motor retailer.

During October 2019, Inchcape sold its UK-based vehicle fleet management and fleet financing outfit to Toyota in exchange for £100 million. That same year, the company attributed a recent decline in profitability to the implementation of more stringent emission standards and a challenging retail market.

In late 2021, Inchcape grew its presence in the Caribbean via the acquisition of Simpson Motors and the InterAmerican Trading Corporation.

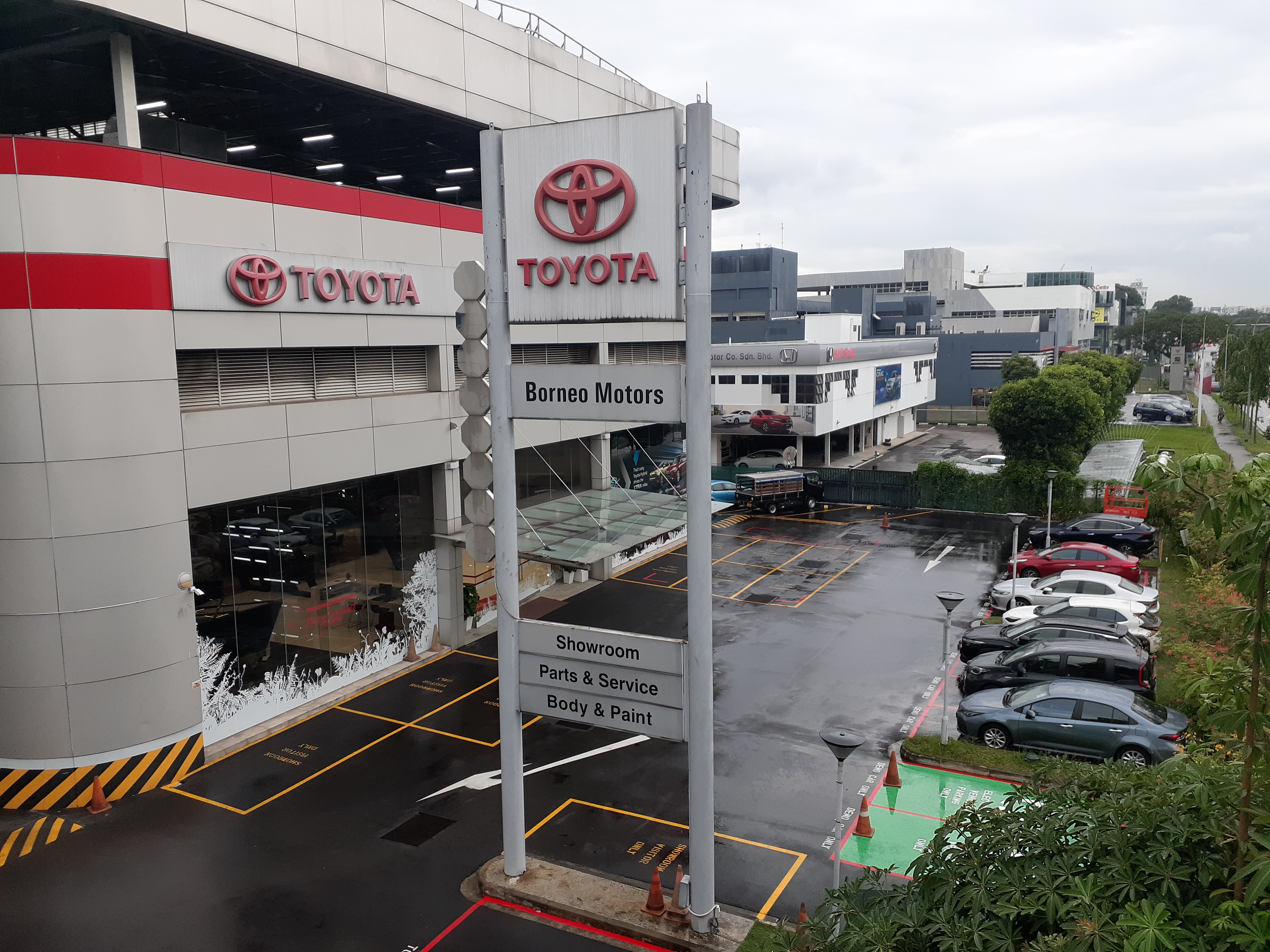
Borneo Motors (Singapore) is part of Inchcape

In December 2022, Inchcape announced that its £1.3 billion acquisition of Latin America’s largest independent automotive distributor, Derco, had been approved by Chilean authorities.

In 2023, the company acquired rights to assemble and distribute Mercedes-Benz passenger cars in Indonesia from Mercedes-Benz AG. The deal included an assembly plant, built in 1978 and located in Bogor, West Java, which became the first manufacturing footprint owned by Inchcape globally.

During April 2024, Inchcape announced the divestment of its UK dealerships to the US-based firm Group 1 Automotive in exchange for £346 million. That same year, the company reported growth in its overseas vehicle distribution and wholesale businesses.

In 2025, group subsidiary Inchcape Kenya took over the New Holland tractor franchise from CMC Holdings and announced it would start offering New Holland products to its clients shortly. That same year, the company attributed attributed a decline in fiscal performance to the enactment of tariffs and changes in foreign exchange rates.

== Operations ==
As of 2025, Inchcape operates in 38 countries across Asia, Australasia and the Pacific, Central and South America, the Caribbean and Europe and Africa.
