= Lords Justices of Ireland =

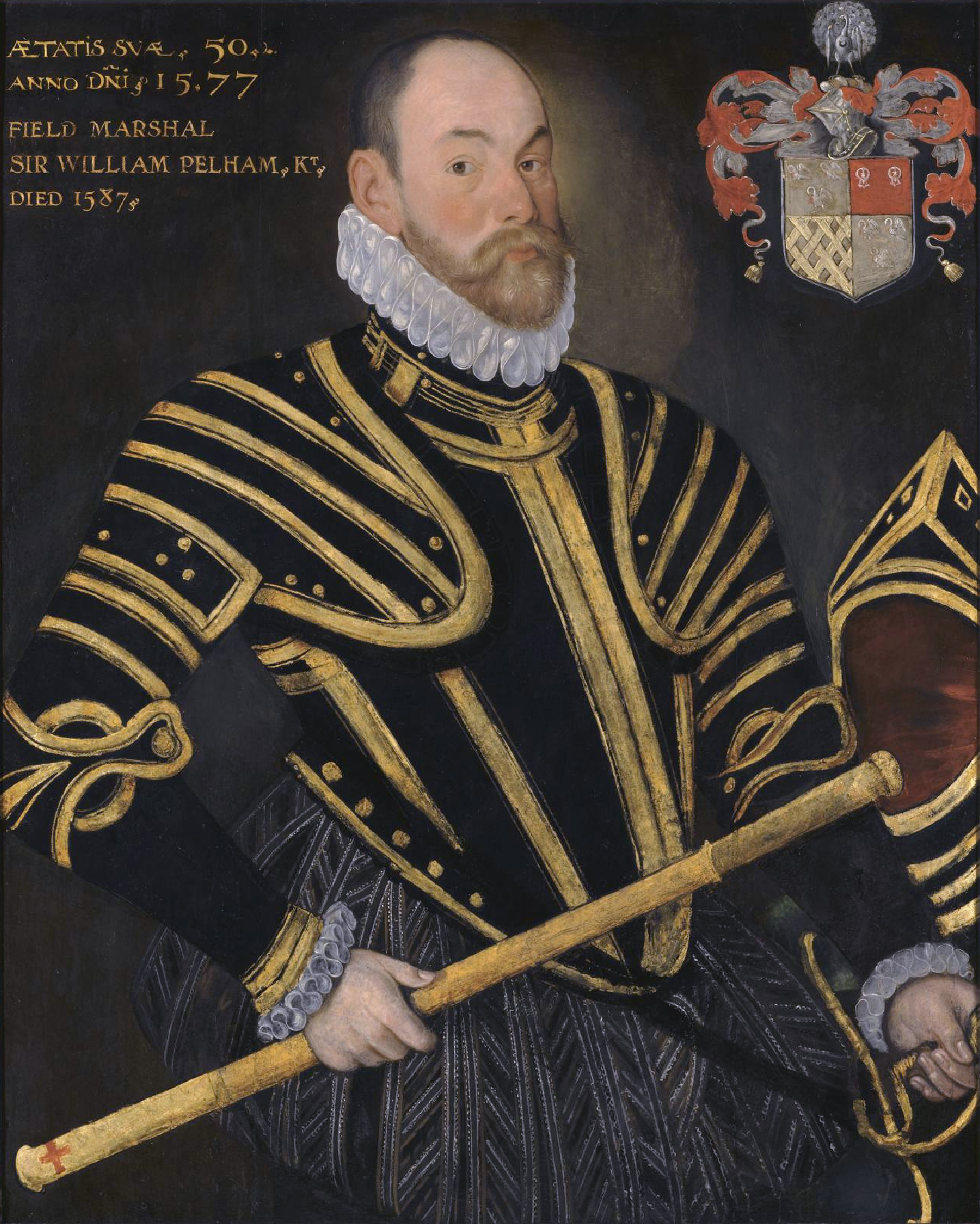
Sir William Pelham, Lord Justice of Ireland

The Lords Justices (more formally the Lords Justices General and General Governors of Ireland) were deputies who acted collectively in the absence of the chief governor of Ireland (latterly the Lord Lieutenant) as head of the executive branch of the Dublin Castle administration. Lords Justices were sworn in at a meeting of the Privy Council of Ireland.

== History ==
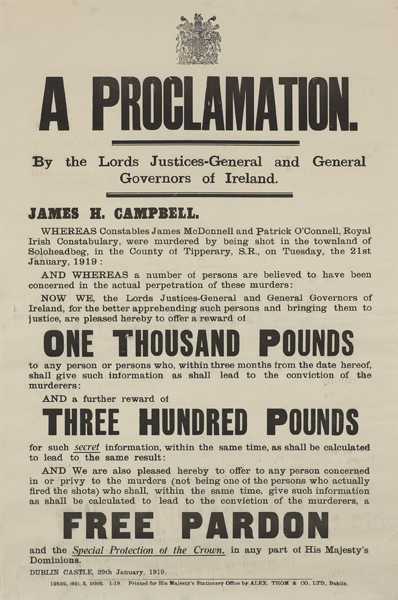
A January 1919 proclamation relating to the Soloheadbeg ambush, issued in the absence of the Lord Lieutenant (Viscount French) by the Lords Justices — James Campbell (Lord Chancellor), Frederick Shaw (Commander-in-Chief) and James Wylie (Land Court judge). Only Campbell signed the proclamation.

After the Norman Conquest of Ireland, the chief governor of the Lordship of Ireland was appointed by the King of England via letters patent; in medieval times under the king's privy seal, and later under the Great Seal of England. The patent usually allowed the chief governor to nominate a deputy, though sometimes the King nominated a deputy, and if the chief governor died in office the Privy Council of Ireland would elect a deputy until the King nominated a successor. The title (originally French or Latin) of the chief governor depended on his power, from most to least: King's (or Lord) Lieutenant; (Lord) Deputy; Justiciar (or Lord Justice); and Keeper. The chief governor's deputy would have a lower title than the chief governor, and was appointed under the Great Seal of Ireland unless by the King. By the time of Henry VII, the Lord Deputy was the resident chief governor (or rarely the resident deputy of a non-resident Lord Lieutenant) and, in case of the Lord Deputy's temporary absence or vacancy, there was one or, later, two Lords Justices appointed by the Privy Council of Ireland. The council's power to elect a deputy was formalised by an act of the Irish parliament of 1471 but withdrawn in 1494 by Poynings' Parliament, which instead specified that the Treasurer of Ireland would be "Justice & Governoure" until the King send a "lieutenunt or deputye". This was repealed three years later, but the statute roll was subsequently lost. A 1542 act formalised how the privy council would elect from among its members one or, if necessary, two Lords Justices, each of whom had to be a layman born in England. The same year the Crown of Ireland Act 1542 changed the Lordship into the Kingdom of Ireland.

In the 17th century, the King often left the chief governorship vacant for months or years and instead appointed multiple Lords Justices. This was so almost continuously from 1690 to 1700. Shortly before his 1696 death Lord Deputy Henry Capel nominated Murrough Boyle, 1st Viscount Blesington and William Wolseley to be Lords Justices; Charles Porter, Capel's rival and Lord Chancellor of Ireland, persuaded the Privy Council of Ireland that the deputies' commission expired on Capel's death, whereupon the council elected Porter as sole Lord Justice. Prior to 1767 the chief governor (now styled Lord Lieutenant or viceroy) was often absent in England unless the Parliament of Ireland was in session, typically eight months every two years. Whereas the Lord Lieutenant was a British peer, the Lords Justices were mostly Irishmen; they were influential and the English government needed their support. There were always three, typically the Speaker of the Irish House of Commons, another member of Irish Commons or Lords, and a senior bishop of the Church of Ireland. After 1767 the viceroy was resident as a rule, and the practical importance of Lords Justices diminished. They were still required during vacancies between the death or departure of one viceroy and the arrival of his successor. A 1788 act repealed and replaced long-disregarded provisions of the 1542 act regarding election of Lords Justices, allowing up to three, who need not be laymen or English-born.

After the Acts of Union 1800, de facto executive power shifted from the viceroy to the Chief Secretary for Ireland, and the Lords Justices like the viceroy exercised only formal power. A newly arrived Lord Lieutenant would be escorted in state from Dunleary (later Kingstown) harbour to the Presence Chamber of Dublin Castle, where the Lords Justices were seated. The party would proceed to the Council Chamber, where the Lord Lieutenant would present his letters patent to the Privy Council, and another letter to the Lords Justices demanding the handover of the sword of state. Up to the mid-nineteenth century the usual Lords Justices were the Lord Chancellor, Church of Ireland Archbishop of Armagh or of Dublin, and Commander-in-Chief, Ireland. In 1868 it was ruled that a warrant signed in 1866 by only one of the three then Lords Justices was valid, because the patent appointing them allowed for this in case of absence "occasioned by sickness or any other necessary cause", and the cause did not have to be stated. After the Church of Ireland was disestablished in 1871, its prelates were no longer made Lords Justices, and usually only two were sworn in or the third was a second senior judge.

Increasingly as the 19th century progressed, Lords Justices were sworn in during short absences from Dublin of the Lord Lieutenant, avoiding delay in validating the growing number of orders in council for routine administration. From 1890 to 1921 such absences averaged eight a year, lasting from days up to more than a month. For example, there were eleven occasions in 1897 in which various subsets of six men were sworn Lords Justices — usually three at a time, but four on two occasions and two on one occasion — the six being Somerset Lowry-Corry, 4th Earl Belmore, Commander-in-Chief Earl Roberts, and four members of the Court of Appeal in Ireland (the Lord Chancellor, Vice-Chancellor, and Master of the Rolls, and Gerald FitzGibbon). While John Thomas Ball was serving as a Lord Justice, he seconded the nomination of Dodgson Hamilton Madden in the 1887 Dublin University by-election, which the Irish Parliamentary Party complained was inappropriate.

In the Irish revolutionary period the Conscription Crisis of 1918 led prime minister David Lloyd George to suggest replacing the Lord Lieutenant on an emergency basis with three Lords Justices. It proved impossible to find three willing to serve; St John Brodrick, 1st Earl of Midleton was prepared to preside but demanded more control of policy than Lloyd George would cede.

After the Anglo-Irish Treaty and partition of Ireland, the Lord Lieutenancy of Ireland was abolished by the Irish Free State (Consequential Provisions) Act 1922 and replaced by the Governor-General of the Irish Free State and Governor of Northern Ireland, which latter had deputies appointed by the Privy Council of Northern Ireland. The Irish Free State had no privy council: the Governor-General's default replacement would be the Chief Justice, but the sole suggestion of invoking this provision, at James McNeill's 1932 resignation, was not taken up.

== List of Lords Justices ==
=== Until 1689 ===
- Sir Thomas Cusack (1552)
- Nicholas Arnold (May 1564–mid-1565)
- Sir William Drury (1578-79)
- William Pelham (1579–80)

10 February–2 July 1616:

- Thomas Jones, (Church of Ireland Archbishop of Dublin and Lord Chancellor of Ireland)
- Sir John Denham (Chief Justice of the Kings Bench for Ireland)

2 May–8 September 1622:

- Sir Adam Loftus (Lord Chancellor of Ireland)
- Richard Wingfield, 1st Viscount Powerscourt (Marshal of Ireland)

c.1635:

- Sir Adam Loftus (Lord Chancellor of Ireland)
- Christopher Wandesford (Master of the Rolls)

10 February 1641–January 1644:

- Sir John Borlase
- Sir William Parsons (to March 1643)
- Sir Henry Tichborne (from 12 May 1643)

26 October 1660–July 1662:

- Maurice Eustace, Lord Chancellor
- Charles Coote, 1st Earl of Mountrath (died 17 December 1661)
- Roger Boyle, 1st Earl of Orrery

1689–1691 (Jacobite; nominal):

- Sir Richard Nagle
- Francis Plowden
- Alexander Fitton

=== 1690–1800 ===
- Henri de Massue, Earl of Galway (6 February 1697–April 1701; 1715–16) in practice dominated his fellow Lords Justices; "but for being a foreigner, he would have been Lord-Lieutenant".
  - John Methuen accepted nomination as Lord Chancellor of Ireland in February 1697 but resiled from serving as a Lord Justice.
- Charles Paulet, 2nd Duke of Bolton (25 May 1697 – 1700)
- Edward Villiers, 1st Earl of Jersey (25 May 1697 – 1699) rarely in Ireland
- Charles Berkeley, 2nd Earl of Berkeley (1699–1700)
- Narcissus Marsh, Church of Ireland Archbishop of Armagh (1699, 1700–01, 1701–02, 1707, 1707–08, 1710)
- Constantine Phipps (1710) Lord Chancellor
- Richard Ingoldsby (1709–1710)
- Robert FitzGerald, 19th Earl of Kildare (1714)
- Colonel Sir Charles Feilding (1714) son of George Feilding, 1st Earl of Desmond
- Charles FitzRoy, 2nd Duke of Grafton (1715–16)
- Hugh Boulter, Church of Ireland Archbishop of Armagh (1726, 1730, 1732, 1734, 1736, 1737, 1738, 1740, 1742)
- Sir Ralph Gore, 4th Baronet (1730 and 1732)
- Field Marshal Richard Molesworth, 3rd Viscount Molesworth (1736)

==== Details ====
| Date appointed | Date sworn in | Primate | Lord Chancellor | Speaker | Others | Ref |
|---|---|---|---|---|---|---|
| 9 Mar 1726 | 2 Apr 1726 | Hugh Boulter, Armagh | Richard West | William Conolly | | |
| | 22 Apr 1730 | Boulter | Thomas Wyndham | Sir Ralph Gore, 4th Baronet | | |
| | 24 Apr 1732 | Boulter | Wyndham (now Baron Wyndham) | Gore | | |
| | 3 May 1734 | Boulter | Wyndham | Gore | | |
| | 19 May 1736 | Boulter | Wyndham | Henry Boyle | | |
| | 28 Mar 1738 | Boulter | Wyndham | Boyle | | |
| | 18 Feb 1741 | Boulter | Robert Jocelyn | Boyle | | |
| | 28 May 1761 | George Stone, Armagh | | John Ponsonby | Boyle (now Earl of Shannon) | |

=== 1801–1847 ===
| Date | Lord Chancellor | Commander | Lord Primate | Ref |
|---|---|---|---|---|
| 13 March 1815 | Thomas Manners-Sutton, 1st Baron Manners | Sir George Hewett | William Stuart | |
| 11 May 1821 | Manners | Sir David Baird | Stuart | |
| January 1829 | Anthony Hart | John Byng, 1st Earl of Strafford | John Beresford | |

=== From 1848 ===
Lords Justices of Ireland, 1848–1920
| Date | Judges (Note: Postnominal letters indicate judicial office as follows: C = Lord Chancellor; LCJ = Lord Chief Justice; MR = Master of the Rolls; LJA = Lord Justice of Appeal; VC = Vice-Chancellor; LJAC = Lord Justice of Appeal in Chancery; J = Justice of the High Court) | Commander | Bishop (Note: See is Dublin unless indicated otherwise.) | Others |
|---|---|---|---|---|
| 20 October 1848 | Maziere Brady C | Edward Blakeney | Richard Whately | |
| 21 March 1849 | Brady C | Blakeney | | |
| 19 May 1849 | Brady C; Francis Blackburne LCJ | Blakeney | | |
| 15 February 1850 | Brady C | Blakeney | Whately | |
| 25 July 1851 | Brady C | Blakeney | | |
| 8 January 1853 | Thomas Langlois Lefroy LCJ | Blakeney | Whately | |
| 25 July 1853 | Brady C | Blakeney | Whately | |
| 16 March 1855 | Brady C | John Colborne, 1st Baron Seaton | Whately | |
| 8 November 1855 | Brady C | Seaton | Whately | |
| 23 October 1856 | Brady C | Seaton | Whately | |
| 4 May 1857 | Brady C | Seaton | Whately | |
| 22 October 1857 | Brady C | Seaton | Whately | |
| 10 March 1858 | Blackburne LJAC | Seaton | Whately | |
| 11 April 1859 | Joseph Napier C | Seaton | Whately | |
| 4 June 1859 | Napier C | | Whately | |
| 5 July 1859 | Brady C | Seaton | | |
| 12 April 1860 | Brady C | George Brown | | |
| 12 December 1860 | Brady C | Brown | Whately | |
| 17 October 1861 | Brady C | Brown | Whately | |
| 13 August 1862 | Brady C | Brown | | |
| 6 March 1863 | Brady C | Brown | Whately | |
| 16 October 1863 | Brady C | Brown | Beresford (Armagh) (Note: Dublin vacant, Whately having died) | |
| 11 April 1864 | Brady C | Brown | Richard Chenevix Trench | |
| 3 October 1865 | Brady C | Hugh Rose (later 1st Baron Strathnairn) | | |
| 5 May 1866 | Brady C | Rose | Trench | |
| 17 July 1866 | Blackburne C | | Trench | |
| 15 December 1868 | Jonathan Christian LJAC | Strathnairn | Trench | |
| 24 December 1868 | | Strathnairn | Trench | |
| 13 June 1870 | Edward Sullivan MR | | | Maziere Brady (ex-C) |
| 20 August 1870 | | William Mansfield (later 1st Baron Sandhurst) | | Brady |
| 9 September 1878 | John Thomas Ball C; Hedges Eyre Chatterton VC | John Michel | | |
| 7 March 1879 | Ball C; Chatterton VC | | | |
| 11 June 1887 | | | | Ball (ex-C) |
| 1 July 1887 | Chatterton VC | Prince Edward of Saxe-Weimar | | Ball (ex-C) |
| 3 January 1894 | Samuel Walker C | Garnet Wolseley, 1st Viscount Wolseley | | |
| 19 March 1894 | Walker C | Wolseley | | |
| 4 June 1894 | Walker C | Wolseley | | |
| 30 July 1894 | Walker C | Wolseley | | |
| 9 July 1895 | Edward Gibson, 1st Baron Ashbourne C; Chatterton VC | | | |
| 11 September 1895 | Ashbourne C; Chatterton VC | | | Somerset Lowry-Corry, 4th Earl Belmore (Irish representative peer) |
| 5 November 1895 | Gerald FitzGibbon LJA; Chatterton VC | | | Belmore |
| 4 February 1896 | Andrew Porter MR; Chatterton VC | | | |
| 9 March 1896 | Porter MR; Chatterton VC | | | |
| 20 March 1896 | Chatterton VC | Frederick Roberts, 1st Baron Roberts of Kandahar (later 1st Earl Roberts) | | |
| 22 April 1896 | Porter MR; Chatterton VC | Roberts | | |
| 2 May 1896 | Ashbourne C; FitzGibbon LJA | Roberts | | |
| 26 May 1896 | FitzGibbon LJA | Roberts | | |
| 12 September 1896 | Ashbourne C; Chatterton VC | | | Belmore |
| 7 December 1896 | Ashbourne C; FitzGibbon LJA | Roberts | | |
| 5 January 1897 | Porter MR; FitzGibbon LJA; Chatterton VC | | | |
| 12 January 1897 | Porter MR; FitzGibbon LJA; Chatterton VC | | | |
| 22 February 1897 | Ashbourne C; Chatterton VC | Roberts | | |
| 4 March 1897 | Porter MR; FitzGibbon LJA; Chatterton VC | | | |
| 19 March 1897 | Ashbourne C; Porter MR; Chatterton VC | | | |
| 4 May 1897 | Porter MR; FitzGibbon LJA; Chatterton VC | | | |
| 26 May 1897 | Porter MR; Chatterton VC | | | |
| 9 September 1897 | Ashbourne C; FitzGibbon LJA | Roberts | | Belmore |
| 12 November 1897 | Ashbourne C; Chatterton VC | Roberts | | Belmore |
| 26 November 1897 | Ashbourne C; FitzGibbon LJA; Chatterton VC | Roberts | | |
| 16 December 1897 | Ashbourne C; Chatterton VC | | | Belmore |
| 8 January 1898 | FitzGibbon LJA; Chatterton VC | Roberts | | |
| 12 February 1898 | Ashbourne C | Roberts | | |
| 22 February 1898 | Ashbourne C; Porter MR; FitzGibbon LJA; Chatterton VC | | | |
| 11 March 1898 | Porter MR; Chatterton VC | | | |
| 19 March 1898 | Ashbourne C; Porter MR; Chatterton VC | Roberts | | |
| 18 April 1898 | Ashbourne C; Porter MR; Chatterton VC | | | |
| 9 May 1898 | Ashbourne C; FitzGibbon LJA; Chatterton VC | | | |
| 13 August 1898 | Ashbourne C; Chatterton VC | | | |
| 29 August 1898 | Ashbourne C; Chatterton VC | | | |
| 14 September 1898 | FitzGibbon LJA | Roberts | | |
| 29 October 1898 | FitzGibbon LJA; Chatterton VC | | | |
| 9 November 1898 | Ashbourne C; Porter MR; Chatterton VC | Roberts | | |
| 19 November 1898 | Porter MR; FitzGibbon LJA | | | |
| 5 December 1898 | Porter MR; FitzGibbon LJA; Chatterton VC | | | |
| 20 January 1899 | Porter MR; Chatterton VC | Roberts | | |
| 13 February 1899 | Ashbourne C; FitzGibbon LJA | Roberts | | |
| 20 March 1899 | Ashbourne C; FitzGibbon LJA; Chatterton VC | Roberts | | |
| 1 May 1899 | Ashbourne C; Porter MR | | | |
| 5 May 1899 | FitzGibbon LJA; Chatterton VC | | | |
| 2 June 1899 | Ashbourne C; FitzGibbon LJA; Chatterton VC | | | |
| 4 July 1899 | FitzGibbon LJA; Chatterton VC | | | |
| 28 August 1899 | Ashbourne C; Porter MR; Chatterton VC | | | |
| 1 November 1899 | Ashbourne C; Chatterton VC | Roberts | | |
| 10 November 1899 | Porter MR; FitzGibbon LJA | | | |
| 21 November 1899 | Ashbourne C; FitzGibbon LJA; Chatterton VC | | | |
| 25 January 1900 | Ashbourne C; Porter MR; FitzGibbon LJA | | | |
| 28 February 1900 | Ashbourne C; Porter MR; FitzGibbon LJA | | | |
| 9 March 1900 | Porter MR | | | Mervyn Wingfield, 7th Viscount Powerscourt (Irish representative peer); Luke Dillon, 4th Baron Clonbrock (Irish representative peer) |
| 22 March 1900 | Porter MR | | | Powerscourt; Clonbrock |
| 27 April 1900 | Ashbourne C; FitzGibbon LJA | | | Clonbrock |
| 26 May 1900 | Porter MR; FitzGibbon LJA | | | |
| 3 September 1900 | Ashbourne C | | | Powerscourt; Clonbrock |
| 17 November 1900 | FitzGibbon LJA | | | Clonbrock |
| 19 November 1900 | Ashbourne C | | | |
| 3 December 1900 | Porter MR; FitzGibbon LJA | | | |
| 17 December 1900 | Ashbourne C; Porter MR; FitzGibbon LJA | | | |
| 17 January 1901 | Porter MR; FitzGibbon LJA | | | |
| 18 January 1901 | | | | Clonbrock |
| 1 February 1901 | Porter MR; FitzGibbon LJA | | | Clonbrock |
| 13 February 1901 | Porter MR; FitzGibbon LJA | | | |
| 19 March 1901 | Ashbourne C; Porter MR; FitzGibbon LJA | | | |
| 31 August 1901 | Ashbourne C; FitzGibbon LJA | | | Powerscourt |
| 31 August 1901 | Ashbourne C; FitzGibbon LJA | | | Powerscourt |
| 28 October 1901 | Porter MR; FitzGibbon LJA; Hugh Holmes LJA | | | |
| 18 November 1901 | Porter MR; FitzGibbon LJA | | | |
| 20 November 1901 | Ashbourne C | | | Powerscourt |
| 5 December 1901 | Porter MR; FitzGibbon LJA; Holmes LJA | | | |
| 18 December 1901 | Porter MR; FilzGibbon LJA | | | |
| 13 January 1902 | Porter MR; FitzGibbon LJA; Holmes LJA | | | |
| 13 February 1902 | Porter MR; FitzGibbon LJA; Holmes LJA | | | |
| 10 March 1902 | Porter MR; Holmes LJA | | | |
| 19 March 1902 | Porter MR; Holmes LJA | | | |
| 7 April 1902 | FitzGibbon LJA; Holmes LJA | | | |
| 10 July 1902 | Porter MR; FitzGibbon LJA | | | |
| 24 July 1902 | Ashbourne C; Porter MR | | | |
| 6 August 1902 | Porter MR; FitzGibbon LJA | | | |
| 13 August 1902 | Ashbourne C | | | Powerscourt |
| 18 August 1902 | Ashbourne C | | | Powerscourt |
| 5 November 1902 | Ashbourne C; FitzGibbon LJA | | | |
| 3 January 1903 | Ashbourne C; FitzGibbon LJA | | | Dermot Bourke, 7th Earl of Mayo (Irish representative peer) |
| 20 March 1903 | | | | Mayo; James Butler, 3rd Marquess of Ormonde |
| 5 May 1903 | FitzGibbon LJA; Holmes LJA | | | |
| 8 June 1903 | FitzGibbon LJA; Holmes LJA | | | |
| 29 June 1903 | FitzGibbon LJA; Holmes LJA; James Andrews J | | | |
| 9 November 1903 | FitzGibbon LJA; Holmes LJA | | | |
| 29 January 1904 | FitzGibbon LJA; Andrews J | | | |
| 5 April 1904 | Holmes LJA | | | Mayo |
| 7 July 1904 | Ashbourne C; Holmes LJA | Francis Grenfell, 1st Baron Grenfell | | Ormonde |
| 4 October 1904 | Ashbourne C; FitzGibbon LJA | Grenfell | | |
| 8 December 1904 | Ashbourne C; FitzGibbon LJA | | | |
| 25 January 1905 | Ashbourne C; FitzGibbon LJA | | | |
| 20 March 1905 | | Grenfell | | Ormonde |
| 22nd April 1905 | Ashbourne C; FitzGibbon LJA | Grenfell | | |
| 12 October 1905 | Ashbourne C; FitzGibbon LJA | | | |
| 4 November 1905 | Holmes LJA | Grenfell | | |
| 13 December 1905 | Walker C | Grenfell | | |
| 29 March 1906 | Walker C; William Moore Johnson J | Grenfell | | Charles Hemphill, 1st Baron Hemphill (Former Solicitor General for Ireland) |
| 9 June 1906 | Walker C; Johnson J | | | Hemphill |
| 4 August 1906 | Walker C; Johnson J | | | |
| 4 September 1906 | Walker C | | | Hemphill |
| 19 December 1906 | Walker C; Johnson J | | | Hemphill |
| 22 February 1907 | Johnson J | | | Hemphill |
| 22 February 1907 | Johnson J | | | Hemphill |
| 25 October 1907 | Walker C; Johnson J | | | |
| 15 September 1908 | Walker C; Johnson J | | | |
| 28 June 1908 | Walker C; Johnson J | | | |
| 7 August 1909 | Walker C | Neville Lyttelton | | |
| 6 October 1909 | Johnson J | Lyttelton | | |
| 15 December 1909 | Walker C | Lyttelton | | William Moore Johnson (ex-J) |
| 21 July 1910 | Walker C | | | Johnson |
| 13 August 1910 | Richard Cherry LJA | | | Johnson |
| 15 September 1910 | Walker C | | | Johnson |
| 16 December 1910 | Walker C; Cherry LJA | | | Johnson |
| 9 June 1911 | Walker C; Cherry LJA | | | Johnson |
| 18 July 1911 | Walker C | | | Johnson |
| 1 September 1911 | Cherry LJA | | | Johnson |
| 19 February 1912 | Cherry LJA | Lyttelton | | |
| 25 June 1912 | Holmes LJA; Cherry LJA | | | |
| 28 December 1912 | Cherry LJA; James Owens Wylie J | Arthur Paget | | |
| 15 March 1913 | | Paget | | Johnson |
| 7 May 1913 | Cherry LJA; Wylie J | | | |
| 21 May 1913 | Wylie J | Paget | | |
| 6 June 1913 | Cherry LJA; Wylie J | | | |
| 26 June 1913 | Cherry LJA; Wylie J | | | |
| 4 October 1913 | Cherry LJA | | | |
| 16 December 1913 | Holmes LJA; Cherry LJA | | | |
| 26 January 1914 | Holmes LJA; Cherry LJA | | | |
| 17 February 1914 | Wylie J | Paget | | |
| 1 May 1914 | Cherry LCJ; Wylie J | Paget | | |
| 22 December 1915 | Cherry LCJ; Wylie J | | | David Harrel (Former Under-Secretary for Ireland) |
| 10 May 1915 | Cherry LCJ; Wylie J | | | Harrel |
| 4 December 1915 | Cherry LCJ; Wylie J | | | |
| 12 February 1916 | Cherry LCJ; Wylie J | | | |
| 11 July 1916 (Note: From The London Gazette. These five were appointed by letters patent under the Great Seal of the United Kingdom in Whitehall rather than the Irish seal in Dublin. They served between the resignation of Lord Lieutenant Viscount Wimborne after the Easter Rising and his reappointment on 11 August 1916 with a new Chief Secretary (Henry Duke replacing Augustine Birrell). Since martial law was in place under the Defence of the Realm Act 1914, General Sir John Maxwell wielded more power as General Officer Commanding in Ireland.) | Cherry LCJ; Wylie J; Jonathan Pim J | | | Bernard FitzPatrick, 2nd Baron Castletown; Harrel |
| 11 September 1916 | Cherry LCJ | | | Harrel |
| 11 November 1916 | Wylie J; Pim J | | | |
| 29 January 1917 | Wylie J; Pim J | | | |
| 19 March 1917 | Wylie J | | | Richard Cherry (ex-LCJ) |
| 14 May 1917 | Pim J | | | Cherry |
| 13 August 1917 | James Campbell LCJ; Wylie J | Bryan Mahon | | |
| 24 July 1918 | Campbell C; Wylie J | | | |
| l2 November 1918 | Campbell C; Wylie J; Pim J | | | |
| 28 January 1919 | Campbell C; Wylie J | Frederick Shaw | | |
| 8 February 1919 | John Ross J; Wylie J | Shaw | | |
| 7 May 1919 | Ross C; Wylie J | Shaw | | |
| 12 June 1919 | Campbell C; Ross J | Shaw | | |
| 26 September 1919 | Campbell C | | | |
| 21 October 1919 | Campbell C | Shaw | | |
| 31 October 1919 | Ross J | | | |
| 14 November 1919 | Campbell C; Ross J | | | |
| 26 November 1919 | Campbell C; Ross J | | | |
| 24 April 1920 | Campbell C; Ross J | Nevil Macready | | |
| 13 May 1920 | Campbell C; Ross J | | | |
| 18 May 1920 | Pim J | Macready | | |
Notes

- 2 May 1921: The three Lords Justices receiving the new Lord Lieutenant, Viscount FitzAlan, were Chancellor Ross, General Macready, and Sir Thomas O'Shaughnessy, the Recorder of Dublin.
- 5 May 1921: Six Lords Justices were sworn in, including the first three Catholics
- 27 June 1921: Nevil Macready, General Officer Commanding in Ireland, was sworn in as a Lord Justice in order to swear in Sir John Ross as Lord Chancellor. The Lords Justice previously appointed were all unavailable owing to the Anglo-Irish War.
- 28 June 1921: The Lord Chief Justice Thomas Molony and the Master of the Rolls Charles O'Connor as Lords Justices opened the inoperative Parliament of Southern Ireland. (The Lord Lieutenant Viscount FitzAlan had opened the operative Parliament of Northern Ireland in person on 7 June.)

== See also ==
- Presidential Commission (Ireland), three officials who collectively deputise for the President of Ireland (since 1937)
- Lords Justices for the government of Northern Ireland, deputised for the Governor of Northern Ireland (1922–1972)

Various deputies for the British monarch:

- Regency Acts provide for a regent during a monarch's total incapacity
- Counsellor of State during partial incapacity, such as when abroad
- Lords Commissioners for routine Parliamentary functions

== Sources ==
- Agnew, David Carnegie A. (1864). Henri de Ruvigny, Earl of Galway: A Filial Memoir. Edinburgh: William Paterson.
- Bagwell, Richard (1909), Ireland under the Stuarts and under the Interregnum, London: Longmans, Green I: 1603–1642; II: 1642–1660; III: 1660–1690
- Edmond, J. P.; Guppy, Henry; Phillips, Arthur, eds. (1910). "Chief Governors of Ireland". Handlist of proclamations issued by royal and other constitutional authorities, 1714–1910, George I to Edward VII. Bibliotheca Lindesiana. Vol. VIII. Wigan: Roger and Rennick. pp. xviii–xix – via National Library of Scotland.
- Empey, Mark, ed. (2015). Early Stuart Irish warrants, 1623–1639: the Falkland and Wentworth administrations. Dublin: Irish Manuscript Commission. ISBN 9781906865566.
- Madden, Richard Robert (1845). The Connexion Between the Kingdom of Ireland and the Crown of England. Dublin: James Duffy.
- Moody, T.W.; Martin, F.X.; Byrne, F.J., eds. (24 March 2011). "Chief Governors". Maps, Genealogies, Lists: A Companion to Irish History, Part II. A New History Of Ireland. Vol. IX. Oxford University Press. ISBN 978-0199593064.
- Hughes, James L. J (1960). Patentee officers in Ireland, 1173–1826; including high sheriffs, 1661–1684 and 1761–1816 (PDF). IMC series. Vol. 55. Dublin: Irish Manuscripts Commission. OCLC 644474152.
- Quekett, Arthur S. (1928). The Constitution Of Northern Ireland. Vol. Part I: The Origin and Development of the Constitution. Belfast: HMSO.
- Quinn, David. B. (1941). "The Bills and Statutes of the Irish Parliaments of Henry VII and Henry VIII". Analecta Hibernica (10): 71–169. ISSN 0791-6167. JSTOR 25510968.
- Steele, Robert (1910). "Chief Governors of Ireland". Bibliography of royal proclamations of the Tudor and Stuart sovereigns and of others published under authority, 1485-1714; Vol. I: England and Wales. Bibliotheca Lindesiana. Vol. V. Oxford: Clarendon Press. pp. ccii–ccvi – via National Library of Scotland.
- Sturgis, Mark (1999). Hopkinson, Michael (ed.). The Last Days of Dublin Castle: The Mark Sturgis Diaries. Dublin: Irish Academic Press. ISBN 978-0-7165-2626-1.
- Travers, Pauric (March 1981). The last years of Dublin Castle: The Administration of Ireland 1890–1921 (PhD). Australian National University.
- Wood, Herbert (8 February 1923). "The Office of Chief Governor of Ireland, 1172-1509". Proceedings of the Royal Irish Academy, Section C. 36: 206–238. ISSN 0035-8991. JSTOR 25504230.
- Wood, Herbert (1 June 1935). "The Titles of the Chief Governors of Ireland". Historical Research. 13 (37): 1–8. doi:10.1111/j.1468-2281.1935.tb00065.x.
