= James Campbell, 1st Baron Glenavy =

Irish politician (1851–1931)

The Right Honourable The Lord Glenavy PC
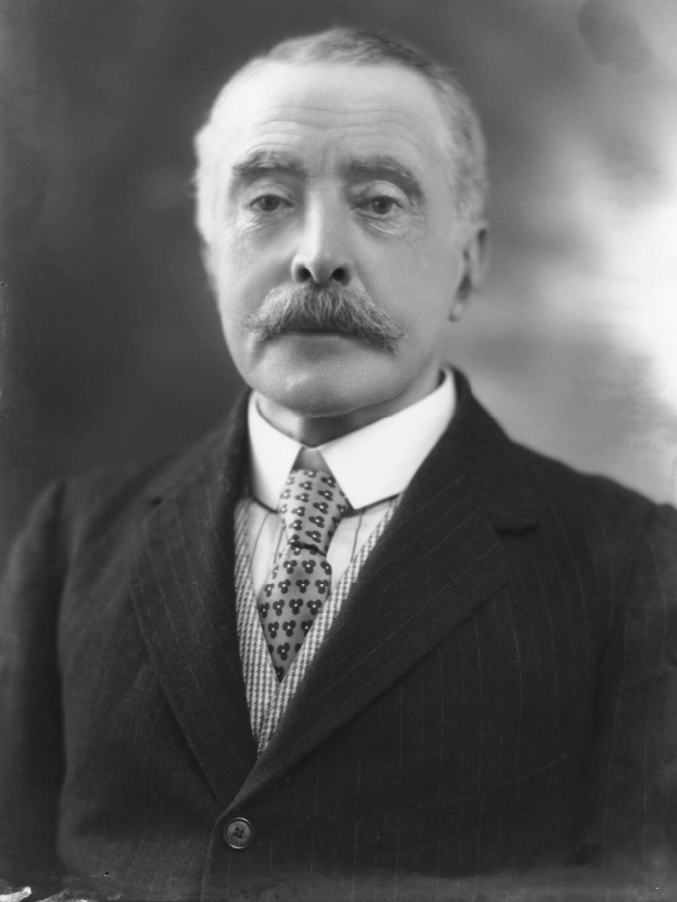
- Glenavy in 1922

Cathaoirleach of Seanad Éireann
- In office 6 December 1922 – 6 December 1928
- Preceded by: New office
- Succeeded by: Thomas Westropp Bennett

Lord Chancellor of Ireland
- In office 1918–1921
- Monarch: George V
- Preceded by: Sir Ignatius O'Brien
- Succeeded by: Sir John Ross

Lord Chief Justice of Ireland
- In office 1917–1918
- Preceded by: Richard Cherry
- Succeeded by: Sir Thomas Molony

Attorney-General for Ireland
- In office 1916–1917
- Preceded by: John Gordon
- Succeeded by: James O'Connor
- In office 1905–1905
- Preceded by: John Atkinson
- Succeeded by: Richard Cherry

Solicitor-General for Ireland
- In office 1901–1905
- Preceded by: George Wright
- Succeeded by: Redmond Barry

MP for Dublin University
- In office 1903–1917
- Preceded by: W. E. H. Lecky
- Succeeded by: Arthur Samuels

MP for Dublin St Stephen's Green
- In office 1898–1900
- Preceded by: William Kenny
- Succeeded by: James McCann

Personal details
- Born: James Henry Mussen Campbell; 4 April 1851 Dublin, Ireland
- Died: 22 March 1931 (aged 79) Dublin, Ireland
- Spouse: Emily McCullough (m. 1884)
- Children: 4, including Charles and Cecil
- Education: Trinity College Dublin

James Henry Mussen Campbell, 1st Baron Glenavy, PC (Ire) (4 April 1851 – 22 March 1931), was an Irish lawyer, politician in the British Parliament and later in the Oireachtas of the Irish Free State. He was also Lord Chancellor of Ireland.

== Barrister and judge ==
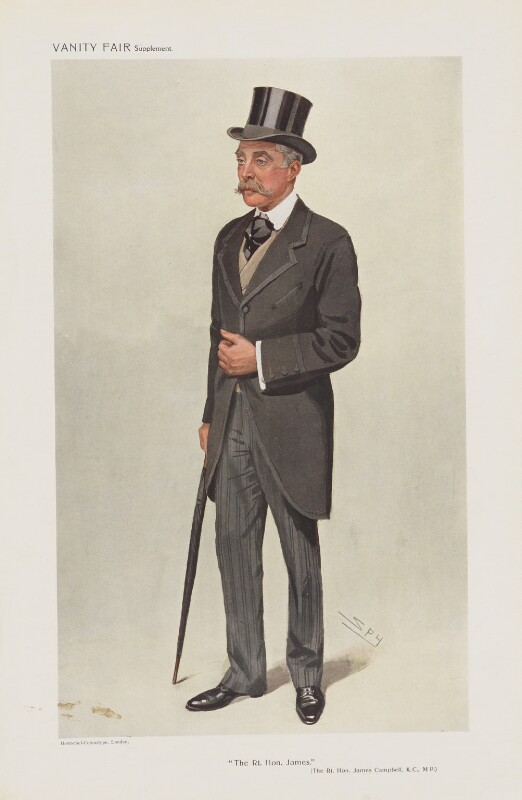
"The Rt Hon James", caricature by Spy in Vanity Fair, 1909

He was born in Dublin and educated at Dr. Stacpoole's School in Kingstown (now Dún Laoghaire) and Trinity College Dublin, graduating BA in 1874. After being called to the Irish bar in 1878, Campbell was made an Irish Queen's Counsel in 1892 and six years later was elected Irish Unionist MP for the seat of Dublin St Stephen's Green. The following year he was called to the English bar, and in February 1902 was elected a Bencher of Gray's Inn. Campbell became Solicitor-General for Ireland in 1901, and in 1903 he was elected to the House of Commons as representative for Dublin University. He was made the country's Attorney General in 1905, being appointed an Irish Privy Counsellor, and in 1916 became Lord Chief Justice of Ireland.

Considerable controversy surrounded the efforts to appoint him a judge: the initial proposal to appoint him Lord Chancellor of Ireland met with fierce resistance from Irish Nationalists, and great efforts were made to find another position for him. It appears that Baron Atkinson was asked to retire from the House of Lords but refused. Pressure was then put on the Lord Chief Justice of Ireland, Richard Cherry, who was seriously ill, to step down. Cherry despite his failing health was initially reluctant to do so, but eventually agreed to retire in December 1916. Maurice Healy in his memoirs remarks that Campbell was considered the finest Irish barrister of his time, with the possible exception of Edward Carson, but as a judge, he was somewhat fretful and impatient, with a tendency (admittedly not uncommon in judges) to interrupt counsel.

== Irish War of Independence ==
Campbell was created a baronet in 1917, and the following year was appointed Lord Chancellor of Ireland. During the Irish War of Independence, his position was somewhat ambiguous. As head of the Irish judiciary, he was naturally expected by the British Government to do all in his power to uphold British rule; but as his later career showed he was not opposed to the existence of the Irish Free State and was quite willing to play a role in the new Government. This pragmatic attitude naturally infuriated the British administration, some of whom regarded it as a betrayal. Mark Sturgis, the Dublin Castle official whose diaries give a vivid picture of these particular years of British rule, condemned Campbell bitterly as a coward who "does nothing and apparently thinks of nothing but the best way to show Sinn Féin that he is neutral and passive". Campbell's successor as Lord Chancellor, Sir John Ross, made similar criticism. Irish historian R. B. McDowell comments that neither Sturgis nor Ross intended to stay in Southern Ireland when their Castle appointments ended, respectively returning to England and relocating to County Tyrone via London.

On relinquishing office in 1921, Campbell was ennobled as Baron Glenavy, of Milltown in the County of Dublin.

== First Cathaoirleach of Free State Seanad ==
In 1922 he was nominated to the new Free State Seanad by W. T. Cosgrave, and was elected by almost all of his fellow senators as its first Cathaoirleach (chairperson) on 12 December 1922. This was in the midst of the Irish Civil War and shortly after his appointment his family home in Kimmage, Dublin was burnt by the anti-Treaty IRA, as part of their campaign against the representatives of the new state.

After the 1925 Seanad election he was again elected as Cathaoirleach on 9 December 1925 by a vote of 40–12. He did not seek re-election when his term in the Seanad expired in 1928.

== Courts of Justice Act 1924 ==
In January 1923, Glenavy chaired the Judicial Committee appointed to advise the Executive Council of the Irish Free State on the creation of a new courts system for the Irish Free State. His recommendations were implemented in the Courts of Justice Act 1924 which largely created the Irish courts system as it currently exists. This replaced, and indeed replicated the existing court system as established by the Government of Ireland Act 1920. The Dáil Courts were declared to have been illegal, but their outstanding 'judgements' were conferred with legal standing by a separate Act of the Oireachtas. Glenavy clashed with another member of the committee, Hugh Kennedy, soon to become the first Chief Justice of Ireland, who was in favour of far more radical changes than those recommended by Glenavy and a majority of the committee. Political differences were compounded by the fact that the two men disliked each other personally.

Lord Glenavy died in Dublin in 1931 and was buried in the city's Mount Jerome Cemetery.

== Family ==
His parents were Colonel William Mussen Campbell and Delia Poole Graham, the daughter of Henry Francis Graham of Newtown Abbey, County Kildare. William and Delia lived at Prospect House, Terenure, County Dublin. His paternal grandfather's family was from Glenavy and Magheragall in County Antrim.

In 1884, he married Emily McCullough and they had three sons and one daughter, including Charles and Cecil. His son Charles married the Irish artist Beatrice Elvery, whose family founded Elverys Sports.

His grandson, under the name Patrick Campbell, was a noted satirist in the early years of television. He was a longtime captain of one of the panels in the BBC gameshow Call My Bluff against British comedy writer Frank Muir. Another grandson, Michael Campbell, later the 4th and last Lord Glenavy, was the author of the work of gay literature, Lord Dismiss Us.

== Arms ==
Coat of arms of James Campbell, 1st Baron Glenavy
Notes Granted 28 November 1917 by George James Burtchaell, Deputy Ulster King of Arms. Crest A boar's head fessewise erased erminois. Torse Of the colours. Escutcheon Gyronny of eight sable and erminois, on a pale gules a sword erect proper, pommel and hilt or. Supporters Dexter, a grey owl proper; sinister, a parrot vert, both beaked and membered or. Motto Ne Quid Nimis(Moderation in all things)

== Notes ==
Parliament of the United Kingdom
Preceded by William Kenny	Member of Parliament for Dublin St Stephen's Green; 1898–1900	Succeeded by James McCann
Preceded by W. E. H. Lecky	Member of Parliament for Dublin University; 1903–1917	Succeeded by Arthur Samuels
Legal offices
Preceded by George Wright	Solicitor-General for Ireland; 1901–1905	Succeeded by Redmond Barry
Preceded by John Atkinson	Attorney-General for Ireland; 1905	Succeeded by Richard Cherry
Preceded by John Gordon	Attorney-General for Ireland; 1916–1917	Succeeded by James O'Connor
Preceded by Richard Cherry	Lord Chief Justice of Ireland; 1917–1918	Succeeded by Thomas Molony
Preceded by Sir Ignatius O'Brien	Lord Chancellor of Ireland; 1918–1921	Succeeded by John Ross
Oireachtas
New office	Cathaoirleach of Seanad Éireann; 1922–1928	Succeeded by Thomas Westropp Bennett
Honorary titles
Preceded by John Ross	President of the College Historical Society; 1925–1931	Succeeded by Douglas Hyde
Peerage of the United Kingdom
New creation	Baron Glenavy; 1921–1931	Succeeded by Charles Campbell
Baronetage of the United Kingdom
New creation	Baronet (of Milltown); 1917–1931	Succeeded by Charles Campbell
