= Outspan =

Outspan may refer to:

- Outspan (brand), South African oranges marketed by Capespan, in the UK remembered for the use of specially-built orange shaped Minis
- The Outspan, South African magazine 1927-1957
- Outspan Hotel, a hotel in Kenya
- Outspan Foster, a character in 1991 film The Commitments
