= High Court of Justice of Ireland =

High Court of Justice of Ireland may refer to:

- High Court (Ireland) current court established in 1924 under Irish law
- High Court of Justice in Ireland former court 1877–1924 established under British law
