= Personality (disambiguation) =

Personality is a set of traits that define the way a person's behavior is perceived.

In debate, a personality is a reference to a particular person.

Personality may also refer to:

== Film and TV ==
- Personality (film), 1930 American comedy
- Personality (game show), 1967 American game show
- BBC Two "Personality" idents, used by BBC Two TV station between 2001 and 2007

== Literature ==
- Personality (magazine), South African weekly magazine (1957–1965), successor to The Outspan
- Personality (novel), 2003 work by Scottish author Andrew O'Hagan

== Music ==
- "Personality" (Jimmy Van Heusen and Johnny Burke song), from 1946 American film Road to Utopia
- "Personality" (Lloyd Price song), 1959 R&B pop hit
- Personality (Nina Badrić album), by Croatian singer Nina Badrić

== Other ==
- Personality (horse) (1967–1990), 1970 American Horse of the Year

== See also ==
- Capacity (law), also known as legal personality
- Radio personality
- Television personality
- Personality Comics, an American comic book publisher
- Personality and Individual Differences, a scientific journal published bi-monthly by Elsevier
