= High Court of Justice in Ireland =

Historic court in Ireland

The High Court of Justice in Ireland was the court created by the Supreme Court of Judicature Act (Ireland) 1877 to replace the existing court structure in Ireland. Its creation mirrored the reform of the courts of England and Wales five years earlier under the Judicature Acts. The Act created a Supreme Court of Judicature, consisting of a High Court of Justice and a Court of Appeal.

== Establishment ==
The High Court was created by the Supreme Court of Judicature (Ireland) Act 1877, through the amalgamation of a number of courts. Most importantly, the three superior common-law courts (the Court of King's Bench, the Court of Common Pleas, and the Court of Exchequer) and the Court of Chancery were merged into the new court. Also merged into it were the courts of Landed Estates, Probate, Matrimonial Causes, Admiralty, and Bankruptcy. However, the right of appeal from Ireland to the House of Lords in England was preserved.

An important consequence of the amalgamation of the superior common-law courts with the court of equity (Chancery) was that, for the first time, the previously separate systems of common law and equity were merged.

The structure of the abolished courts was reflected in the divisions created for the new High Court. These proved to be unnecessarily complex, and the opportunity presented by the death, retirement, and transfer of a number of the judges was taken in order to simplify the organisation of the divisions, so that by 1897 there were only two: Chancery, and the Queen's Bench.

Of the existing office holders, the Lord Chancellor of Ireland presided in the new Court of Appeal. The Master of the Rolls in Ireland and the Vice-Chancellor moved to the Chancery Division; the latter office was abolished in 1904. The Chief Justice of the Irish Common Pleas retained his rank until 1887 when the incumbent became Lord Chief Justice of Ireland. Christopher Palles, the last Chief Baron of the Irish Exchequer remained in office until 1916, acting as a judge both of the King's Bench Division and of the Court of Appeal.

== Partition ==
The Government of Ireland Act 1920 abolished the Supreme Court of Judicature created by the 1877 Act. It split the High Court into separate courts for Northern and Southern Ireland; judges of the former court became judges in Southern Ireland unless they chose otherwise. The Court of Appeal was also split into separate courts with a new overarching High Court of Appeal for Ireland; the latter court sat on a few occasions but was abolished in 1922 in consequence of the establishment of the Irish Free State.

== Judges ==
The following judges held the title of Judge of the High Court of Justice in Ireland from the Court's creation in 1878 to the abolition of the pre-independence courts in 1924. Dates in brackets indicate holding an equivalent position in a predecessor court prior to 1878.

Puisne judges of the High Court of Justice in Ireland (1878–1921) and High Court of Justice in Southern Ireland (1921–1924)
Name	Division						Reason for leaving office
Name	Common Pleas (1878–1888)	King's/ Queen's Bench (Note: Queen's Bench until the death of Queen Victoria in 1901; King's Bench thereafter.) (1878–1924)	Exchequer (1878–1897)	Probate (Note: Probate and Matrimonial Division until the death of John FitzHenry Townsend in 1893; Probate, Matrimonial, and Admiralty Division thereafter.) (1878–1897)	Chancery (1878–1924)	Land (Note: "Judicial Commissioner of the Land Commission", colloquially "Land Judge") (1881–1924)	Reason for leaving office
William Keogh	[1856]–1878						Died
James O'Brien		[1858]–1882					Died
Francis Alexander FitzGerald			[1859]–1882				Resigned
John FitzGerald		[1861]–1882					Appointed as a Lord of Appeal in Ordinary
Robert Warren				[1868]–1897 (Note: Judge of the Court of Probate until 1878)			Died
James Anthony Lawson	[1868]–1878	1878–1887					Died
Stephen Woulfe Flanagan					[1869]–1885 (Note: Judge of the Landed Estates Court prior to 1878)		Retired
Charles Robert Barry		[1872]–1897					Died
Richard Dowse			[1872]–1890				Died
Henry Ormsby					[1875]–1885		Retired
Michael Harrison	1878–1888	1888–1895					Died
John O'Hagan						1881–1890	Died
William O'Brien	1882–1883	1883–1899					Died
William Drennan Andrews		1897–1909	1882–1897				Retired
William Moore Johnson		1883–1909					Retired
James Murphy	1883–1888	1888–1892; 1897–1901	1892–1897				Died
John Monroe					1885–1896		Resigned
Hugh Holmes	1887–1888	1888–1897					Promoted to be a Lord Justice of Appeal
John George Gibson		1888–1921					Retired
Edmund Thomas Bewley						1890–1898	Retired
Dodgson Hamilton Madden		1892–1919					Retired
John Ross					1896–1921		Appointed as Lord Chancellor for Ireland
Walter Boyd		1897–1916					Retired
William Kenny		1897–1921					Died
Richard Edmund Meredith						1898–1906	Appointed as Master of the Rolls
Dunbar Plunket Barton		1900–1904			1904–1918		Retired
George Wright		1901–1913					Died
James Owens Wylie						1906–1920	Retired
William Huston Dodd		1907–1924					Court abolished
Thomas Molony		1913–1915					Promoted to be a Lord Justice of Appeal
Jonathan Pim		1913–1924					Court abolished
John Gordon		1916–1922					Died
William Moore		1917–1921					Promoted to be a Lord Justice of Appeal in Northern Ireland
James O'Connor					1918–1918		Promoted to be a Lord Justice of Appeal
John Blake Powell					1918–1923		Died
Arthur Samuels		1919–1924					Court abolished
William Evelyn Wylie						1920–1922; 1923–1924 (Note: The position was abolished by the Irish Free State (Consequential Provisions) Act 1922 but reconstituted in the Irish Free State in 1923. (It was separately reconstituted in the High Court of Justice in Northern Ireland and filled by Daniel Martin Wilson).)	Court abolished (Note: When the High Court of Justice in Southern Ireland was replaced in 1924 by the High Court of the Irish Free State, Wylie agreed to be appointed to this on condition that he continue to specialise in Irish Land Commission work.)

== Subsequent developments ==
Following the establishment of the Irish Free State in December 1922, the High Court of Justice in Southern Ireland (now the High Court of the Irish Free State) remained in existence for two years, in accordance with the "carry-over" provisions in Article 75 of the Constitution of the Irish Free State. It was abolished by the Courts of Justice Act 1924, which replaced it with a new High Court. With only two exceptions, the judges of the old High Court were retired on a generous pension.

In Northern Ireland a new Supreme Court of Judicature was created in 1978, although the basic court structure remained largely unchanged.
