= James Wylie =

James Wylie may refer to:

- Sir James Wylie, 1st Baronet (1768–1854), Scottish physician
- James Aitken Wylie (1808–1890), Scottish historian of religion and Presbyterian minister
- James Hamilton Wylie (1844–1914), British historian and author
- James Owens Wylie (1845–1935), Irish lawyer and judge
- Jim Wylie (1887–1956), New Zealand rugby union player
