= Stephen Woulfe Flanagan =

Irish landowner, barrister, and judge

Stephen Woulfe Flanagan, PC, PC (Ire) (4 August 1816 – 6 December 1891) was an Irish landowner, barrister, and judge. He was a judge of the Landed Estates Court and of the Chancery Division of the Irish High Court.

== Biography ==
Born in County Kildare, Flanagan was the second son of Terence Flanagan, of Knockhall, County Roscommon, and of Mary Johanna, daughter of Stephen Woulfe, of Tiermaclane House, Ennis. His mother was the sister of Stephen Woulfe, Chief Baron of the Irish Exchequer. Flanagan matriculated at Trinity College Dublin in 1833 and entered the Middle Temple in 1837. In 1838 he graduated Bachelor of Arts and was called to the Irish Bar. He was appointed a Queen's Counsel in 1859.

Flanagan was secretary to the Landed Estates Commission until he was appointed Master in the Encumbered Estates' Court in 1850. The office was abolished on the establishment of the Landed Estates Court in 1858, whereupon he returned to private practice. but it was provided that Flanagan's tenure as Master should be counted as reckonable service for pension purposes if he were to be appointed to the Landed Estates Court.

Flanagan was subsequently appointed to the Landed Estates Court in 1869, on the death of William Cary Dobbs. He remained the Court's only judge until Henry Ormsby was appointed in 1875. In 1878, Flanagan was appointed a judge of the Chancery Division of the Irish High Court when the Landed Estates Court was abolished by the Supreme Court of Judicature Act (Ireland) 1877.

Flanagan resigned from the bench in 1885 and was sworn of the Imperial Privy Council, having been sworn to the Irish Privy Council in 1876. In retirement, he occasionally heard appeals in the Judicial Committee of the Privy Council.

Flanagan owned 3,500 acres in Sligo and Roscommon, in addition to houses in or near Dublin. A Roman Catholic and a Liberal in politics, Flanagan died in Dublin in 1891.

== Family ==
In 1851, he married Mary Deborah, daughter of John Richard Corballis QC; they had six sons and five daughters. His eldest son, John Woulfe Flanagan (1852–1929), became principal leader writer at The Times, from which position he bitterly attacked Charles Stewart Parnell, and High Sheriff of Roscommon. John married his cousin Maria Emily Sheil (died 1888), daughter of Sir Justin Sheil and granddaughter of Chief Baron Woulfe. Stephen's fourth son, James Woulfe Flanagan, resident magistrate for Newry district, was assassinated in 1922 on leaving Newry Cathedral after a service.
