= James O'Connor (Irish judge) =

Irish solicitor, barrister and judge

Sir James O'Connor, KC PC (I) (1 April 1872 – 29 December 1931), was an Irish solicitor, barrister and judge. He was appointed Solicitor-General for Ireland in 1914, Attorney-General for Ireland in 1917, and a judge of the Supreme Court of Judicature of Ireland in 1918. After his enforced retirement in 1924, he practised at the English bar until 1929, when he returned to Ireland and was readmitted to practice as a solicitor, a controversial move necessitating a leading judgment on the standard of professional conduct to be expected of a former judge.

== Biography ==
James O'Connor was born in Wexford, the third son of Michael O'Connor, the senior partner in a long-established solicitors' firm, and was educated at Blackrock College. He married Mary Keogh in 1897. He practised as a solicitor for a few years before being called to the Irish Bar in 1900; he became King's Counsel in 1908. In 1911 he published a treatise on the powers and duties of justices of the peace in Ireland. On 20 May 1909 he was admitted to the Middle Temple, but withdrew a few years later without being called to the English bar. A Liberal and a Catholic, within a few years he had built up a large practice, and he rose in his profession with remarkable speed: he was appointed Solicitor-General at 42, Attorney General at 45, and at 46 briefly a judge of the Chancery division of the High Court of Justice in Ireland and then a Lord Justice of the Court of Appeal in Ireland at 46.

In January 1921, during the Irish War of Independence, O'Connor met informally in London with Irish Unionist leader Edward Carson and Sinn Féin activist Fr Michael O'Flanagan to discuss a peaceful solution to the conflict, but without success. In 1922 he was appointed by the Provisional Government to the commission examining Irish railways. His judicial career was cut short by the Courts of Justice Act 1924, which abolished the High Court and Court of Appeal established in 1877, only two of whose judges were appointed to the Irish Free State's new High Court and Supreme Court. The judges forced into retirement received generous compensation, and O'Connor was one of many who moved to England. He was knighted in the 1925 New Year Honours. The same year, he published a two-volume history of Ireland since the 1798 rebellion, rejoined the Middle Temple on 23 April, and was called to the English bar on 6 May. The Cambridge Law Journal published his address, "Thoughts about the Common Law", in 1928. Serious ill health compelled him to give up practice. He returned to Ireland, where his health improved, at least in the short term, and his doctors advised him that return to legal practice would be beneficial to his health.

== In re O'Connor's Application ==
O'Connor is best remembered today for the ruling on his application for re-admission to practice as a solicitor, in which the Chief Justice held that while the application would be granted, as a general rule for a senior judge to return to legal practice was contrary to public policy. The case began badly when O'Connor filed an 8-line affidavit which, remarkably, did not refer to his career as a judge at all. The Chief Justice, Hugh Kennedy, made clear his disapproval of this conduct, required a further detailed affidavit and asked for the attendance of the Attorney General. The Attorney General's view was that "such a practice would open an avenue to corruption".

The tenor of Kennedy's judgment suggests that he agreed with the Attorney General. He noted that, although some senior English judges like Francis Pemberton had returned to practice at the bar, none had done so since the Act of Settlement 1701, which in his view reflected the understanding that appointment to the Bench means that "the practice of law is abandoned forever" because "if a man should step down from the privileged position of the Bench and throw off what is a sacred office to engage in the rough-and-tumble of litigious contest … he will shake the authority of the judicial limb of Government, and mar the prestige of the Courts of Justice upon which the whole structure of the State must always lean. Moreover, a new way of scandal and corruption would be opened up".

However, Kennedy found that special circumstances existed: notably that O'Connor had not wished to return to practice but had been forcibly retired from the Bench, and it was on medical advice that he was seeking an active profession. Kennedy was careful to state that he was certain that O'Connor had no improper motive; he granted the application on condition that O'Connor did not seek to appear in court.

== Death and reputation ==
O'Connor rejoined the family firm, but the recovery in his health was short-lived and he died in 1931, aged 59.

Gerard Hogan suggests that both Kennedy's judgment in the case and his diary reveal his low personal and professional opinion of O'Connor. It is true that Kennedy had an extremely poor opinion of the pre-Independence judges as a whole, recommended their removal from the Bench en bloc, and did not suggest O'Connor as one of the very few exceptions. On the other hand, he spelt out clearly that O'Connor was free from any suggestion of corruption and, according to one report, stated that his "returning to the fold" would be a great honour to the legal profession.

Maurice Healy described O'Connor as a man of great ability, but with no respect for the traditions of the Irish bar: in Healy's view he was a failure as a Law Officer, but a good High Court judge and an even better appeal court judge.

Legal offices
Preceded by Jonathan Pim	Solicitor-General for Ireland; 1914–1917	Succeeded by James Chambers
Preceded by James Campbell	Attorney-General for Ireland; 1917–1918	Succeeded by Arthur Samuels
