= Thomas Dawson Brodie =

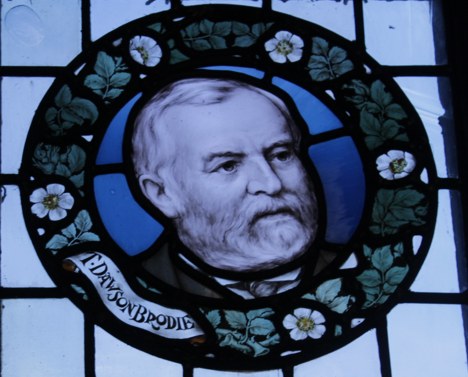
Stained glass of Brodie in the Scottish National Portrait Gallery

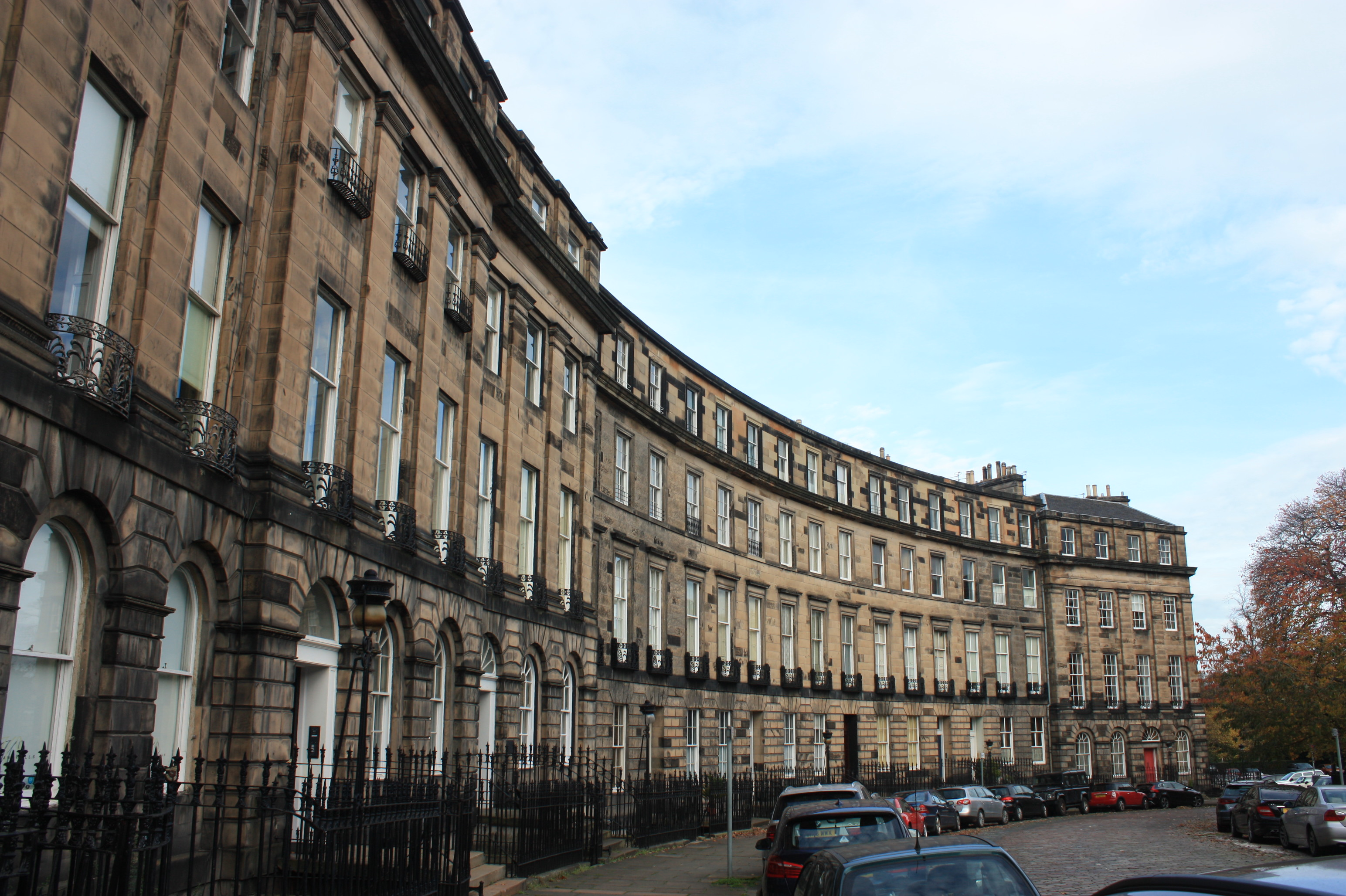
Brodie lived at Ainslie Place in Edinburgh

Escutcheon of the Brodie baronets of Idvies

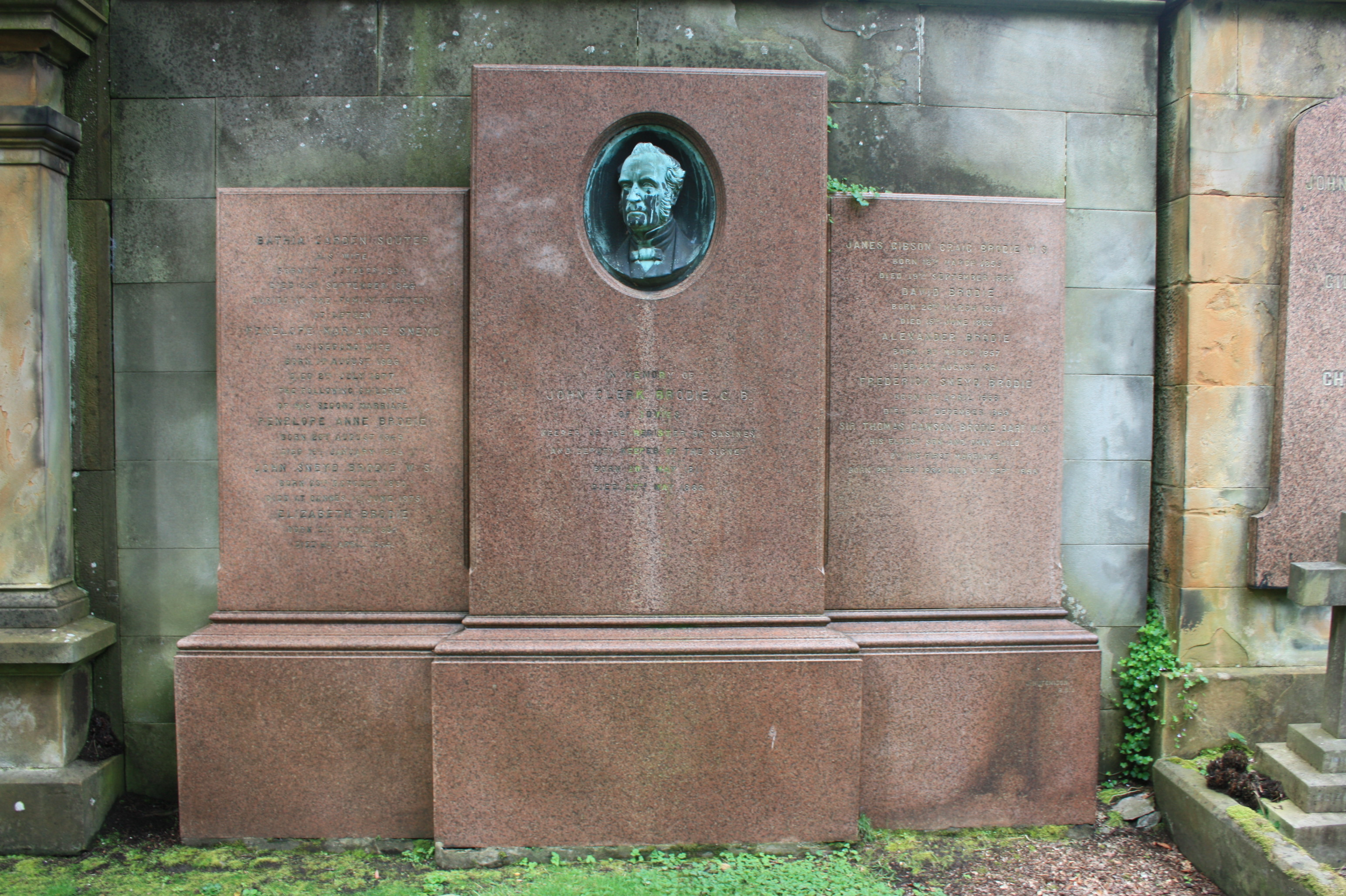
The grave of John Clerk Brodie and Thomas Dawson Brodie, Dean Cemetery, Edinburgh

Sir Thomas Dawson Brodie, 1st Baronet of Idvies (1832–1896) was a Scottish lawyer and peer and progenitor of the Scottish law firm Brodies.

== Life ==
He was born Thomas Brodie in Edinburgh on 26 December 1832 the son of John Clerk Brodie WS (1811-1888) and his wife Bethia Garden Souter. His mother died when Thomas was 12 years old and his father remarried. From 1877 he styled himself Dawson Turner.

He was educated at Edinburgh Academy from 1841 to 1847 then completed his education at Harrow. He then studied law at Edinburgh University before joining his father's law firm "Gibson, Craig & Brodie" at 26 Moray Place. He was created Writer to the Signet in 1857. From 1865 he ran a branch of his father's firm at 14 Alva Street moving to 4 St Colme Street in 1876 and to 9 Ainslie Place in 1880.

Only in 1885 did the Brodies separate from the other partners and become known as "John Brodie & Sons". By this stage John Brodie was aged 74 and no longer an active partner. When his father died in 1888 he took over the law firm based at 5 Thistle Street in Edinburgh's First New Town.

In July 1890 he was elected a Fellow of the Royal Society of Edinburgh. His proposers were Sir William Thomson, Lord Kelvin, Peter Guthrie Tait, Sir Arthur Mitchell and A Beatson.

On 28 March 1892 Queen Victoria created him as 1st Baronet of Idvies, Idvies being a country estate his father had purchased in Angus, east of Forfar.

He died at home, 9 Ainslie Place on the Moray Estate (formerly the home of James Ivory, Lord Ivory) in the West End of Edinburgh on 6 September 1896. He is buried with his parents in nearby Dean Cemetery. The monument was sculpted by John Hutchison.

== Family ==
In 1862 Brodie married Charlotte Frederika Furnell. She died in 1870 and in 1876 he married Anne Dawson, daughter of William Dawson, of Gairdoch, Stirlingshire. Dame Anne (Lady) Dawson Brodie died at 9 Ainslie-place, Edinburgh, on 18 February 1903.

== Memorials ==
Brodie appears as a donor in the memorial window on the south stair of the Scottish National Portrait Gallery on Queen Street, Edinburgh.

Baronetage of the United Kingdom
Preceded by O'Brien baronets	Brodie baronets of Idvies; 28 March 1892	Succeeded by Durand baronets
