= Richard Cherry =

Irish politician and judge (1859–1923)

Richard Cherry

Richard Robert Cherry PC, QC (19 March 1859 – 10 February 1923) was an Irish politician and judge. He was Attorney-General for Ireland from 1905 to 1909, a judge of the Irish Court of Appeal and subsequently Lord Chief Justice of the King's Bench in Ireland 1913–1916. A Liberal, he was elected as the Member of Parliament (MP) for Liverpool Exchange in 1906. Cherry's published works include Lectures on the Growth of Criminal Law in Ancient Communities, 1890, and a book on the Irish Land Acts which was described as an indispensable part of every Irish barrister's library. He was president of the Statistical and Social Inquiry Society of Ireland between 1908 and 1911.

== Background and education ==
Cherry was born in Waterford, the second son of Robert William Cherry, a solicitor; the family was of French Huguenot origin. He was a graduate of Trinity College Dublin, where he had been auditor of the College Historical Society and secretary of the University Philosophical Society.

== Legal career ==
In 1889, Cherry became Reid Professor of Criminal and Constitutional Law at Trinity College Dublin, and published two books on criminal law. He was called to the Bar in 1881 and became Queen's Counsel in 1896. His promising career was, according to his family, damaged by his staunch opposition to the Boer War, although this did not prevent his appointment as Attorney General for Ireland in 1905 or his election to the House of Commons the following year.

His elevation to the Bench in 1909 was said to be due to his desire to be relieved from the extreme pressure of his work as a Law Officer; possibly he was already suffering from ill health, although it was not until some years later that he was diagnosed with what was described as "slow paralysis". His illness did not prevent his promotion to the office of Lord Chief Justice; however, he served only three years, retiring partly through ill-health and partly because the Government was very anxious to promote James Campbell to the Chief Justice's office. After the Easter Rising he served briefly as Lord Justice of Ireland, entrusted with emergency powers of government.

His retirement was as active as his increasingly bad health allowed: he divided his time between his summer house at Greystones, County Wicklow, and his townhouse at St. Stephen's Green, where he died. He married Mary Cooper in 1886; their daughter Mary published a biography of her father in 1924.

=== Bodkin's case ===
As Attorney General Cherry became embroiled in the politically sensitive case of Matthias Bodkin, a barrister and well-known journalist, who was appointed a County Court judge, only to find his appointment challenged on the grounds that he was not, as the law requires, a "practising barrister". The case eventually settled, but not before Cherry's conduct of it had come in for severe criticism. A M Sullivan, one of the counsels involved, called his arguments "nonsense"; Maurice Healy wrote that his argument that the royal prerogative could not be questioned "would have rejoiced the heart of James I" but did not impress an Irish Court in the early 1900s.

=== Reputation ===
Maurice Healy, who had first-hand experience of appearing in Court before Cherry, did not rate him highly. While praising his legal textbooks, he considered him a plodding barrister and a well-meaning but ineffectual law officer and judge: "his knowledge of his fellow men was not extensive, and erred towards charity." Healy allows that he had at least the virtue of courtesy, at a time when many of the Irish judiciary had acquired a regrettable reputation for rudeness and impatience. Some of his colleagues like Sir Walter Boyd, 1st Baronet, openly despised him.

More recently Hogan in a much fuller account of Cherry's career gives a far more favourable picture: he argues that Cherry's rapid rise in his profession suggests a much greater degree of legal ability than Healy allows, and that his speeches and judgments show him to have been a man of intelligence and originality. Hogan agrees with Healy that Cherry was not an outstanding judge, and was too much inclined to agree with his colleagues, but argues that his few long judgments are of high quality, especially those on land law, on which he was an acknowledged expert.

== Personal life ==
Cherry was noted as an expert bellringer, and he, along with Gabriel Lindoff and Digby Scott, founded the Irish Association of Change Ringers in 1895, and was soon after appointed President of the Association.

Cherry also presented two trebles to St. Patrick's Cathedral, Dublin in 1909, making it the first twelve-bell tower in Ireland. He was involved in the first peal on the twelve bells, which is believed to have been the first peal on twelve bells rung outside England.

Parliament of the United Kingdom
Preceded by Charles McArthur	Member of Parliament for Liverpool Exchange; 1906 – 1910	Succeeded by Max Muspratt
Legal offices
Preceded by James Campbell	Attorney-General for Ireland; 1905–1909	Succeeded by Redmond Barry
Preceded by Peter O'Brien	Lord Chief Justice of Ireland; 1914–1917	Succeeded by James Campbell
