= Beatrice Elvery =

Irish stained-glass artist and painter

Beatrice Moss Elvery
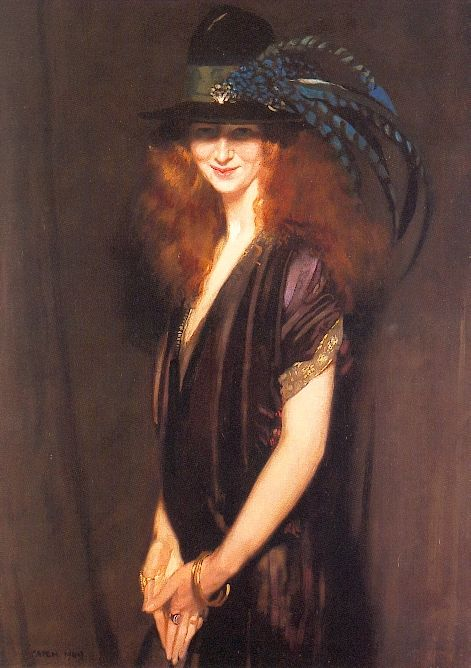
- Portrait of Beatrice Elvery by William Orpen (1909)
- Born: 1881
- Died: 1970 (aged 88–89)
- Education: Dublin Metropolitan School of Art; Slade School of Fine Art
- Spouse: Charles Campbell, 2nd Baron Glenavy

Beatrice Moss Elvery, RHA (1881, Dublin – 1970, Rockall, Sandycove) was an Irish painter, stained-glass artist and sculptor.

== Early life ==
Beatrice Moss Elvery was born in 1881, the second daughter of the Dublin businessman, William Elvery, whose family had originated from Spain where they were silk merchants. Her family owned the original Elverys Sports store in Wicklow Street, Dublin. Beatrice's mother, Theresa Moss, had attended the Dublin Metropolitan School of Art along with her sister, Annie Moss. Following in their mother's footsteps, Beatrice and her sister, Dorothy Elvery attended the Dublin Metropolitan School of Art (now the National College of Art and Design) where William Orpen (1878–1931) taught painting and later used Beatrice as a model.

Of his pupil, Orpen wrote that she had "many gifts, much temperament and great ability. Her only fault was that the transmission of her thoughts from her brain to paper or canvas, clay or stained glass became so easy to her that all was said in a few hours. Nothing on earth could make her go on and try to improve on her first translation of her thought." She remained a friend and correspondent of Orpen until shortly before his death in 1931. As a student at the Dublin Metropolitan School, Elvery won numerous prizes, including the Taylor Scholarship in 1901, 1902 and 1903. She is only one of three students to win the scholarship three years in succession.

Having been a working artist, Beatrice Elvery returned to the Dublin Metropolitan School of art to learn the art of making and painting leaded glass. Her teacher was Alfred Child. She was much influenced by Christopher Whall's book 'Stained glass work, a textbook for students and workers in glass.'

== Career ==
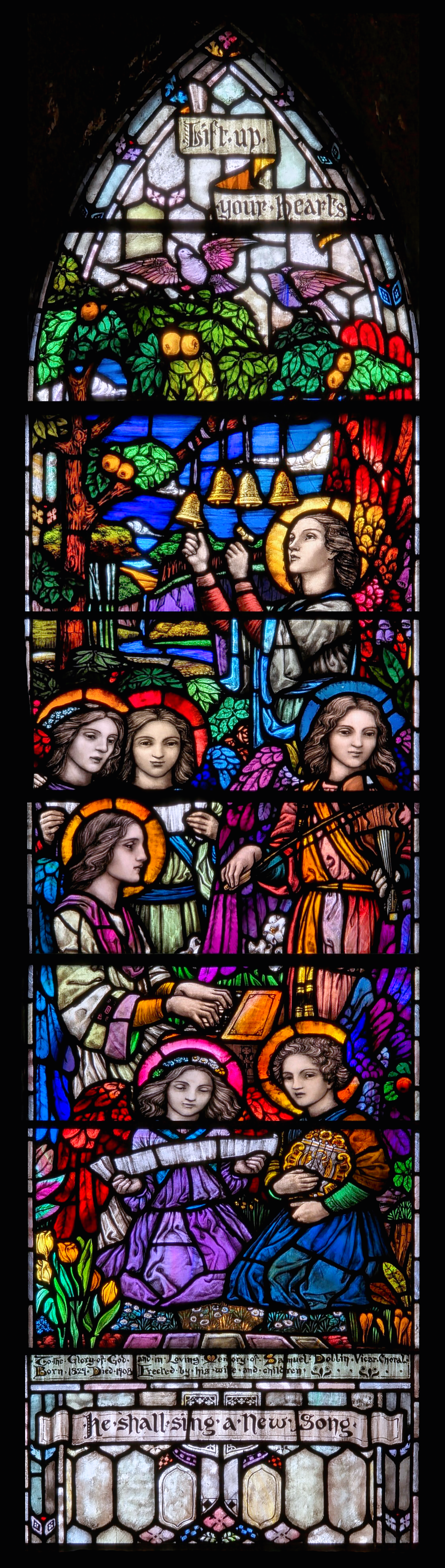
Stained glass by Beatrice Elvery at St. Patrick's Cathedral in Dublin

When Sarah Purser founded her studio An Túr Gloine (The Tower of Glass) in 1903, she invited Beatrice Elvery to be one of the designers. Her first commission of six windows was installed in the Convent of Mercy chapel, Enniskillen, County Fermanagh in 1905. Christ among the Doctors, 1907, is at St Stephen's Church, Mount Street, Dublin; and St Nicholas's Church, Carrickfergus, a three-light, Good Samaritan; and The Prodigal Son. Some of her sketch designs in ink and watercolour are held in the National Gallery of Ireland.

Beatrice Elvery produced stained glass windows for St Patrick's Cathedral, Dublin, the Cathedral of the Annunciation of the Blessed Virgin Mary and St Nathy, Ballaghaderreen, St Canice's Cathedral, Kilkenny, and some twenty other churches.

Elvery's paintings and book illustrations include Éire (1907) which was a landmark painting modelled on a performance of Yeats' play 'Cathleen ni Houlihan' in which Maud Gonne played the title role. The painting promoted the idea of an independent Irish state. The painting was bought by Maud Gonne who presented it to Patrick Pearse.

She also produced numerous illustrations for children's books. Elvery was appointed an associate member of the Royal Hibernian Academy in 1932 and a full member in 1934. Her paintings were described by Albert Power as '...romantic, absurd, theatrical and exhilarating...'.

In 1912, Elvery married the barrister Charles Campbell, later the second Baron Glenavy, and they at first settled in London. She had three children, Patrick, Bridget (known as Biddy) and Michael.

In London, the circle in which the couple lived was frequented by literary and artistic personalities. Their circle included W. B. Yeats, George Bernard Shaw, D. H. Lawrence, Middleton Murry, and Katherine Mansfield. The latter described Beatrice in one of her letters as 'a queer mixture for she is loving and affectionate, and yet she is malicious'. Her portrait of Mansfield in Elvery's garden is in the collection of the Museum of New Zealand Te Papa Tongarewa.

At the end of the First World War, the Campbells returned to Ireland, after which Elvery concentrated on her painting. In the Irish Civil War, their house was targeted for burning by Anti-treaty forces. Elvery objected to the attack and insisted on the raiders allowing her to rescue the books. By the end of the process, she was directing the burning-party to remove first edition books, original paintings, furniture, and, because it was Christmas eve, her children's presents. She did not want to repeat the Christmas shopping.

Elvery's daughter Bridget was killed by a bomb in London during the Second World War.
