= Peter O'Brien, 1st Baron O'Brien =

Irish lawyer and judge (1842–1914)

The Right Honourable The Lord O'Brien PC QC
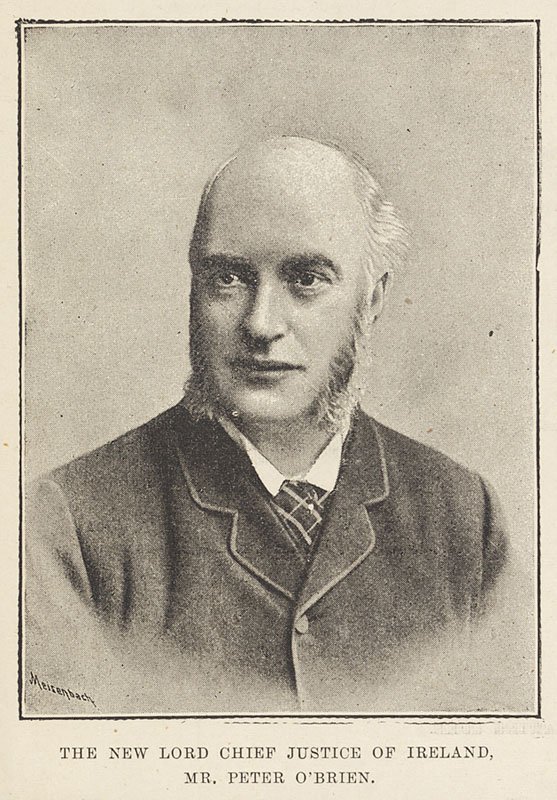
- Lord O'Brien.

Lord Chief Justice of Ireland
- In office 1889–1913
- Monarchs: Victoria; Edward VII; George V
- Preceded by: Sir Michael Morris, Bt
- Succeeded by: Richard Robert Cherry

Personal details
- Born: 29 June 1842 Carnelly House, Clarecastle, County Clare
- Died: 7 September 1914 (aged 72) Airfield, Stillorgan, County Dublin
- Education: Trinity College Dublin

Peter O'Brien, 1st Baron O'Brien, PC, QC (29 June 1842 – 7 September 1914), known as Sir Peter O'Brien, Bt, between 1891 and 1900, was an Irish lawyer and judge. He served as Lord Chief Justice of Ireland between 1889 and 1913. In his lifetime he was universally known as Peter the Packer, due to the skill he displayed as Attorney-General in securing verdicts by packed juries.

== Background and education ==
O'Brien was born at Carnelly House, Clarecastle, County Clare, the fifth son of John O'Brien, Liberal Member of Parliament for Limerick, and his wife Ellen Murphy, daughter of Jeremiah Murphy of Hyde Park, County Cork. He was a nephew of Mr. Justice James O'Brien of the Court of King's Bench (Ireland). He was educated at Clongowes Wood College and Trinity College Dublin and was called to the Irish Bar in 1865.

== Legal and judicial career ==
O'Brien joined the Munster circuit and built up a successful practice, and in 1880 became a Queen's Counsel. The following year he was appointed Junior Crown Counsel at Green Street, Dublin, becoming Senior in 1882, and was made a bencher of the King's Inns in 1884.

He was one of the principal prosecutors in the Phoenix Park murders, and it is said that his life was threatened as a result. He unsuccessfully stood for the House of Commons as the Liberal candidate for County Clare in 1879: his defeat is said to have been due to his opposition to Irish Home Rule.

In 1887 O'Brien was appointed Solicitor-General for Ireland, becoming Attorney-General for Ireland and an Irish Privy Counsellor the following year. He was finally appointed Lord Chief Justice of Ireland in 1889, holding the office for 24 years. As Attorney General he was considered to be a highly efficient civil servant; even Arthur Balfour, the Chief Secretary for Ireland, who thought poorly of most of the Irish Law Officers who served under him, praised O'Brien for his hard work. He showed great skill in "packing" juries in politically sensitive cases with jurors who could be trusted to convict, thus earning the nickname "Peter the Packer", which stuck to him all his life.

Opinions on his judicial ability vary. A. M. Sullivan wrote that as a pupil of the great Chief Baron Christopher Palles he must have learned the principles of common law but, though intelligent, he was generally too lazy to apply them. Palles himself is said to have remarked of one of O'Brien's judgments "you never learned that law from me!". However, his judgement in R. (Bridgeman) v. Drury [1894] 2 I.R. 489 where he refused to allow the members of Dublin Corporation to charge the ratepayers of Dublin for a particularly lavish picnic, is still often quoted both for its legal principle and its remarkable wit and humour. His judgment in Ussher v. Ussher (1912), on whether a marriage conducted according to the Roman Catholic rite can be valid if there is only one witness to it, has also been praised as "careful and erudite." He was notoriously susceptible to female charms: it was said that a pretty young lady was generally treated as a conclusive witness for whichever side she appeared.

O'Brien was created a Baronet, of Merrion Square in the County of the City of Dublin, on 28 September 1891, and was ennobled as Baron O'Brien, of Kilfenora in the County of Clare, in 1900.

== Personal life ==
Lord O'Brien married Annie Clarke, daughter of Robert Hare Clarke of Bansha Castle, County Tipperary, and his second wife Anne Butler in 1867 and had three children: James, who died young, Ellen (who died in 1930) and Anne Georgina.

Lord O'Brien also had an Irish mistress, based in London, called Mary McNally with whom he separately had 4 children, who went by the name of Blake.

His only legitimate son having predeceased him, he died without male heirs at Airfield, Stillorgan, County Dublin, on 7 September 1914, his barony and baronetcy thus becoming extinct.

His daughter, Annie Georgina O'Brien, published an affectionate memoir of her father a few years after his death. His main personal foibles were his refusal to wear the judicial wig, and a lisp so pronounced that it often made his remarks from the Bench difficult to follow.

Maurice Healy in his own memoir The Old Munster Circuit described O'Brien as a man of considerable legal ability and great natural kindness, who was deservedly very popular. On the other hand, he was rather vain and self-important, and inclined to stand on the dignity of his office.

== Arms ==
Coat of arms of Peter O'Brien, 1st Baron O'Brien
Notes Confirmed 1 September 1891 by Sir John Bernard Burke, Ulster King of Arms. Crest An arm embowed vested Azure brandishing a sword Argent hilt and pommel Or and charged with a fasces in pale Proper. Escutcheon Gules three lions passant guardant in pale per pale Or and Argent a chief of the second. Motto Vigueur De Dessus

Legal offices
Preceded by John George Gibson	Solicitor-General for Ireland; 1887–1888	Succeeded by Dodgson Hamilton Madden
Preceded by John George Gibson	Attorney-General for Ireland; 1888–1889	Succeeded by Dodgson Hamilton Madden
Preceded by Sir Michael Morris, Bt	Lord Chief Justice of Ireland; 1889–1913	Succeeded by Richard Robert Cherry
Peerage of the United Kingdom
New creation	Baron O'Brien; 1900–1914	Extinct
Baronetage of the United Kingdom
New creation	Baronet (of Kilfenora); 1891–1914	Extinct
Preceded by Savory baronets	O'Brien baronets of Kilfenora; 28 September 1891	Succeeded by Brodie baronets
