= Charles Campbell, 2nd Baron Glenavy =

British Baron (1885–1963)

Charles Henry Gordon Campbell, 2nd Baron Glenavy (1885–1963) succeeded his father James to become 2nd Baron Glenavy in March 1931. He was in turn succeeded as the 3rd Baron by his son, the satirist and television personality Patrick Campbell.

Charles was educated at Charterhouse School and was a barrister who met and married Beatrice Elvery. He was a contemporary of D. H. Lawrence, to whom he was introduced by Katherine Mansfield and John Middleton Murry on 26 July 1913.

Known as Gordon Campbell, he served as Secretary of the new Department of Industry and Commerce, notably pushing for schemes to increase employment from 1922, which failed, and promoting the Shannon hydroelectric scheme with his minister Patrick McGilligan. From 1925 Campbell's influence decreased, being opposed to Patrick Hogan's policy of economic support for the larger farmers.

From 1932 to 1963, Campbell served as president of the council of the Royal Victoria Eye and Ear Hospital. He was appointed a director of Bank of Ireland becoming governor (chairman) from 1945 to 1948, and was involved in the transition of the Currency Commission into the Central Bank of Ireland in 1942–43.

== Coat of arms ==
Coat of arms of Charles Campbell, 2nd Baron Glenavy
Crest A boar's head fessewise erased erminois. Escutcheon Gyronny of eight sable and erminois, on a pale gules a sword erect proper, pommel and hilt or. Supporters Dexter, a grey owl proper; sinister, a parrot vert, both beaked and membered or. Motto Ne Quid Nimis (Moderation in all things)

Peerage of the United Kingdom
Preceded by James Campbell	Baron Glenavy; 1931–1963	Succeeded by Patrick Campbell
