= Dorothy Kay =

Irish-born South African artist

- Born: Dorothy Moss Elvery; 1886; Greystones, Co. Wicklow, Ireland
- Died: 1964 (aged 77–78); Port Elizabeth, South Africa
- Education: Dublin Metropolitan School of Art
- Known for: Paintings, etchings, illustration, portraits
- Spouse: Hobart Kay (m. 1910)
- Children: 4
- Relatives: Beatrice Elvery (sister)

Dorothy Moss Kay (1886–1964, née Elvery) was an Irish-born South African artist.

== Early life, family and education ==
Dorothy Elvery was born in 1886 in Greystones, County Wicklow, Ireland. Her father was William Elvery, whose family owned Elverys Sports store in Dublin. Her sister Beatrice Elvery (1883-1970, also known as Beatrice, Lady Glenavy), was a painter, stained-glass artist and sculptor. Elvery trained at Dublin Metropolitan School of Art in 1900 and at the Royal Hibernian Academy school, but "promoted the notion that she was 'self-taught'".

In 1910 she moved to South Africa to marry Hobart Kay, FRCS; by 1916 they had settled in Port Elizabeth.

== Artistic career ==
Kay was a founder member of the Eastern Province Society of Arts and Crafts. In 1924 she was elected a member of the Royal British Colonial Society of Artists. She painted and made etchings, and in 1926 her etching Romance was bought by Queen Mary at the Dominion Artists' Exhibition in London. She travelled widely in South Africa and sketched as she went, and was also commissioned to make many portraits of mayors of Port Elizabeth, many of them lost when the City Hall burned down in 1977. During World War II she was commissioned by the government to record the war on the home front, and some of her work is held in the South African National War Museum. From 1927 to 1945 she produced two to four illustrations each week for The Outspan.

Her largest painting was the 1937 work Surgery, showing a patient undergoing abdominal surgery (a cholecystectomy). Kay portrayed herself as the scrub nurse and her husband Hobart as the surgeon. In preparation for this painting she visited three hospitals and observed at least two operations, making 27 pages of preliminary sketches of people and equipment used in surgery. During World War II she painted further medical paintings: Operation in a Base Hospital and Blood to Save Lives.

She held one-woman exhibitions from 1922 to 1955, and retrospective exhibitions of her work were held at the South African National Gallery in 1965 and 1982.

== Personal life ==
In her early days at Port Elizabeth, Kay was a keen sailor and was described as "for a time the fastest spinnaker-hand in South Africa".

She had three daughters and one son. Her daughter Joan Wright (1911-1991) taught painting at the Port Elizabeth Technical College School of Art and Design, and her daughter Marjorie Reynolds wrote and published a biography of her mother in 1989, and a further book about the Elvery family in 1991, and also donated her mother's collection of works and archives to the Iziko South African National Gallery as "The Kay Bequest" in 1992.

Kay died at Port Elizabeth in 1964.
