= Lord Dismiss Us =

1967 novel by Michael Campbell

- First edition
- Author: Michael Campbell
- Language: English
- Genre: Novel
- Publisher: William Heinemann
- Publication date: 1967
- Publication place: United Kingdom
- Media type: Hardback and paperback
- Pages: 378 p. (hardback edition)
- ISBN: 978-0-552-08042-2
- OCLC: 30292393

Lord Dismiss Us is a 1967 novel by Michael Campbell, that deals with issues of homosexuality in an English boys' public school.

== Plot summary ==
The novel is set in a public school in England in the 1960s. It deals with the love affair between two boys, together with the internal politics of the school itself. Carleton, a sixth former, loves Allen, a boy two years his junior. At the same time, the headmaster is trying to enforce a policy against such liaisons.

== Historical context ==
The novel is set firmly in the era in which it was written. It appeared in the same year that homosexuality between consenting adults was legalised in the UK.

== Adaptations ==
In 2017, Taggart creator Glenn Chandler adapted the novel into a play for the Edinburgh Festival Fringe, to mark the 50th Anniversary of the partial legalisation of homosexuality in England and Wales. The play received positive reviews, and subsequently transferred to the Above The Stag Theatre in London later that year. The play was once again reviewed positively, and was nominated for four Offies, including "Best Production" and "Best New Play".

== Author ==
The author, Michael Mussen Campbell (1924–1984), was the grandson of the 1st Baron Glenavy and brother of the 3rd Baron, the humourist Patrick Campbell. He was a Dubliner who attended St Columba's College and Trinity College. Lord Dismiss Us was allegedly based on the suicide of a St Columba's schoolmaster.

Briefly a barrister at the Irish Bar, Campbell worked in London for the Irish Times. His other novels included Peter Perry (1956), a "story of Dublin Theatrical Life", Oh Mary, This London (1959), a fantasy set in London, and Across the Water (1959).

Michael Campbell succeeded his brother Patrick in 1980 to become the 4th and last Baron Glenavy. He died in London on 10 June 1984, having never married.
