= Baron Glenavy =

Extinct barony in the Peerage of the United Kingdom

Baron Glenavy, of Milltown in the County of Dublin, was a title in the Peerage of the United Kingdom. It was created on 26 July 1921 for the noted Irish lawyer and Unionist politician Sir James Campbell, 1st Baronet, who served as Lord Chief Justice of Ireland from 1916 to 1918 and as Lord Chancellor of Ireland from 1918 to 1921. He had already been created a baronet in the Baronetage of the United Kingdom in 1917.

Sir James Campbell was succeeded as Baron by his son, Charles Campbell. On the second Baron's death the titles passed to his eldest son, the third Baron, who was known simply as Patrick Campbell and was a well-known journalist, humorist and television personality. Patrick Campbell died without male issue and was succeeded by his younger brother, the novelist Michael Mussen Campbell, who never married. On the fourth Baron's death in 1984 the baronetcy and barony became extinct.

== Barons Glenavy (1921) ==
- James Henry Mussen Campbell, 1st Baron Glenavy (1851–1931)
- Charles Henry Gordon Campbell, 2nd Baron Glenavy (1885–1963)
- Patrick Gordon Campbell, 3rd Baron Glenavy (1913–1980)
- Michael Mussen Campbell, 4th Baron Glenavy (1924–1984)

== Coat of arms ==
Coat of arms of Baron Glenavy
Crest A boar's head fessewise erased erminois. Escutcheon Gyronny of eight sable and erminois, on a pale gules a sword erect proper, pommel and hilt or. Supporters Dexter, a grey owl proper; sinister, a parrot vert, both beaked and membered or. Motto Ne Quid Nimis(Moderation in all things)

== Sources ==
- Debrett's Peerage and Baronetage (1968 edition)
- Leigh Rayment's Peerage Pages
