= Patrick Campbell, 3rd Baron Glenavy =

Irish journalist, humorist, and television personality (1913–1980)

Patrick Campbell
- 3rd Baron Glenavy
- Patrick Campbell
- Tenure: 1963 – 9 November 1980
- Predecessor: Charles Campbell
- Successor: Michael Campbell
- Born: Patrick Gordon Campbell; 6 June 1913; Dublin, Ireland
- Died: 9 November 1980 (aged 67); London, England
- Spouses: Sylvia Alfreda Willoughby Lee (m. 1941; div. 1947); Chery Louise Munro (m. 1947; div. 1966); Vivienne Orme (m. 1966)
- Father: Charles Campbell, 2nd Baron Glenavy
- Mother: Beatrice Elvery
- Occupation: Journalist, humorist, television personality
- Education: Pembroke College, Oxford

Patrick Gordon Campbell, 3rd Baron Glenavy (6 June 1913 – 9 November 1980, London) was an Anglo-Irish journalist, humorist, television personality, and peer, with a seat in the House of Lords from 1963 until his death.

== Life and career ==
Campbell was born in Dublin, the first son of Charles Campbell, 2nd Baron Glenavy, and his wife the artist Beatrice Elvery. He was educated in England at Rossall School (which he loathed), and then at Pembroke College, Oxford, but left Oxford without completing his degree. He was then taken on by The Irish Times, working for Bertie Smyllie, and began his career reporting for the column "Courts Day by Day".

During the Second World War, Campbell served as a chief petty officer in the Irish Marine Service. After the war, he rejoined The Irish Times (using the pseudonym 'Quidnunc'), and was put in charge of the column "An Irishman's Diary". He also wrote a weekly column for the Irish edition of the Sunday Dispatch before working on the paper in London from 1947 to 1949. He was assistant editor of Lilliput from 1947 to 1953. His journalism was also published in The Sunday Times.

In 1963 he succeeded his father as Baron Glenavy, gaining a seat in the House of Lords of the United Kingdom, in which he rarely made an appearance.

Campbell spoke with a stammer, but delighted television audiences with his wit, notably as a regular team captain on the long-running show Call My Bluff, opposite his longtime friend Frank Muir. Muir noted that "When he was locked solid by a troublesome initial letter he would show his frustration by banging his knee and muttering 'Come along! Come along!'". He also made regular appearances in Not So Much a Programme, More a Way of Life.

== Books ==
Campbell's books were mostly collections of humorous pieces originally published in newspapers and magazines. They included: A Long Drink of Cold Water (1949), A Short Trot with a Cultured Mind (1950), An Irishman's Diary (1950), Life in Thin Slices (1951), Patrick Campbell's Omnibus (1954), Come Here Till I Tell You (1960), Constantly in Pursuit (1962), How to Become a Scratch Golfer (1963), Brewing Up in the Basement (1963), Rough Husbandry (1965), The P-P-Penguin Patrick Campbell (1965), All Ways on Sundays (1966), A Bunch of New Roses (1967), My Life and Easy Times (1967, autobiography), The Coarse of Events (1968), Gullible Travels (1969), The High Speed Gasworks (1970), Waving All Excuses (1971), Patrick Campbell's Golfing Book (1972), Fat Tuesday Tails (1972), 35 Years on the Job (1973), and The Campbell Companion (1987). Many of his books were illustrated by Ronald Searle.

In his obituary, The Times said of Campbell that

In his writing his quizzical eye fastened on a score of subjects from hoteliers to taxi drivers to children and General de Gaulle (of whom he was said to give a more than passable imitation) and suddenly a new facet of character would appear to tickle the fancy of his admiring readers.

== Personal life ==
Campbell was married three times. His first wife was Sylvia Alfreda Willoughby Lee, whom he married in 1941; they were divorced in 1947. His second wife was Chery Louise Munro: they married in 1947 and were divorced in 1966, the year he married Vivienne Orme.

Campbell was six feet five inches tall, and several of his funniest pieces dealt with the problems faced by a man of his build in merely finding shoes or clothes that would fit him.

He lived for many years in the south of France. In 1972, Campbell became ill and it was discovered that he had a permanent heart weakness, having suffered an undetected heart attack some years before. In 1980, an attack of viral pneumonia exacerbated the condition. He died suddenly on 9 November 1980 at University College Hospital in London. He was succeeded as the 4th and last Baron Glenavy by his novelist brother Michael Mussen Campbell.

== Coat of arms ==
Coat of arms of Patrick Campbell, 3rd Baron Glenavy
Crest A boar's head fessewise erased erminois. Escutcheon Gyronny of eight sable and erminois, on a pale gules a sword erect proper, pommel and hilt or. Supporters Dexter, a grey owl proper; sinister, a parrot vert, both beaked and membered or. Motto Ne Quid Nimis (Moderation in all things)

Peerage of the United Kingdom
Preceded by Charles HG Campbell	Baron Glenavy; 1963–1980	Succeeded by Michael Mussen Campbell
