= George Wright (lawyer) =

Irish lawyer and judge

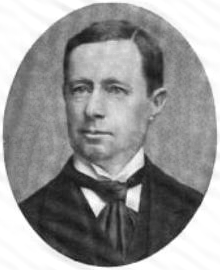
- In The Sketch, 30 October 1901
- Born: 1847; Clonakilty, County Cork
- Died: 16 May 1913 (aged 65–66); Bray, County Wicklow
- Occupation(s): Lawyer, judge
- Spouse: Mary Barrington (m. 1881)

George Wright (1847 - 16 May 1913) was an Irish lawyer and judge.

== Biography ==
Wright was born in Clonakilty, County Cork, son of Thomas Wright. His father and brothers practised as solicitors in Clonakilty: one of his brothers was H.T. Wright, Clerk of the Peace for Cork. He married Mary Barrington in 1881. His family owned Fernhill House, Clonakilty, which is now a hotel.

He was called to the Bar in 1871, took silk in 1884, and served as Solicitor-General for Ireland from January 1900 to October 1901 in the Unionist government headed by Lord Salisbury. He was appointed to the Queen's Bench Division of the Irish High Court in 1903 where he served till his death. He was immensely popular with his colleagues and greatly respected as a lawyer. A colleague humorously described him as a man who is "on the borderline of genius but never trespasses"; a popular verse hailed him as "Judge Wright, who's never wrong!"

Wright died in Bray, County Wicklow on 16 May 1913.

Legal offices
Preceded by Dunbar Barton	Solicitor-General for Ireland; 1900–1901	Succeeded by James Campbell
