= Sir John Ross, 1st Baronet =

Irish politician and judge

The Right Honourable Sir John Ross Bt KC

Lord Chancellor of Ireland
- In office 1921–1922
- Monarch: George V
- Preceded by: James Campbell
- Succeeded by: Office abolished

Member of Parliament for Londonderry City
- In office 1892–1895
- Preceded by: Justin McCarthy
- Succeeded by: Edmund Vesey Knox

Personal details
- Born: 11 December 1853 Derry, County Londonderry, Ireland
- Died: 17 August 1935 (Aged 81) County Tyrone, Northern Ireland
- Education: Trinity College Dublin

Sir John Ross, 1st Baronet, PC (I), KC (1853–1935) was an Irish politician and judge who was the last person to hold the office of Lord Chancellor of Ireland.

== Early life ==
He was born in Derry, County Londonderry, Ireland, on 11 December 1853. He was the eldest son of the Reverend Robert Ross DD, Presbyterian Minister and, at one time, Moderator of the Presbyterian Church in Ireland. His mother was a Miss Christie. He was educated at the model school and at Foyle College, Derry, where the songwriter Percy French was one of his schoolfriends. In 1873 he entered Trinity College Dublin. He became president of the University Philosophical Society in 1877 and graduated BA in the same year; in 1878 he was auditor of the College Historical Society, where his contemporaries included the politician and judge Edward Carson (later Lord Carson) and James Campbell (the future Lord Glenavy, Lord Chancellor of Ireland). He graduated with a Bachelor of Laws (LL. B.) degree in 1879.

== Judge ==
Ross had entered Gray's Inn, London, in 1878 and was called to the Irish Bar in 1879. He became a Queen's Counsel in 1889. He was Conservative member of the House of Commons for Londonderry City from 1892 until his defeat in 1895. In 1896 Ross was elevated to the bench as land judge in the Chancery Division of the High Court of Justice in Ireland. When appointed, he was the youngest judge in the United Kingdom and he was the first Presbyterian judge of the High Court. Maurice Healy noted that he was as scrupulous in avoiding any suggestion of religious bias as he was in not allowing his own political views to colour his judgement. While his main training was in equity, he was also a good criminal lawyer.

Ross was sworn of the Privy Council of Ireland in 1902. In 1919 he was created a baronet. In 1921, in succession to Sir James Campbell, Ross was appointed Lord Chancellor of Ireland. He was to be the last holder of that office, which was abolished in December 1922. Ross retired to London, but later he returned to live in Northern Ireland.

He was president of the St John Ambulance Brigade in Ireland and during the First World War was in control of all Red Cross activities in southern Ireland. In 1914 he was made a Knight of Grace of the Grand Priory of the Order of St John of Jerusalem. During the war, he was also chairman of the Irish board for the selection of candidates for commissions in the British Army.

== Family ==
In 1882 Ross married Katherine Mary Jeffcock (d. 1932), who was the only daughter of Lieutenant-Colonel Deane Mann, of Dunmoyle and Corvey Lodge, County Tyrone, and his wife Mary Stobart Jeffcock. They had one son, Major Sir Ronald Deane Ross MC MP, and two daughters, Irene and May, the younger of whom predeceased her father. Ross died, of bronchial pneumonia, at his home, Dunmoyle Lodge, Sixmilecross, County Tyrone, on 17 August 1935, and was succeeded as the second baronet by his son.

== Character ==
Maurice Healy, who described most of the Irish judges of his time in his memoir The Old Munster Circuit, praises Ross in the highest terms, recalling his "splendid presence", his beautiful command of the English language, and his unfailing kindness to young barristers. Like all judges he had his foibles, notably a fondness for horse racing: he was a habitué of Punchestown Racecourse, and the Bar had an unofficial understanding that no case would be listed for hearing on a Punchestown day. In this way, Healy remarks, he showed that he was very human, and that humanity was what made him a great judge.

== Arms ==
Coat of arms of Sir John Ross, 1st Baronet
Crest A fox's head erased holding in his mouth a white rose slipped barbed and seeded all Proper. Escutcheon Gules a portcullis Or between three lions rampant guardant Argent each holding between his paws a water bouget Sable. Motto (Hope Lightens Danger)

Parliament of the United Kingdom
Preceded by Justin McCarthy	Member of Parliament for Londonderry City; 1892–1895	Succeeded by Edmund Vesey Knox
Legal offices
Preceded by James Campbell	Lord Chancellor of Ireland; 1921–1922	Office abolished
Honorary titles
Preceded by The Lord Ashbourne	President of the College Historical Society; 1913–1925	Succeeded by The Lord Glenavy
Baronetage of the United Kingdom
New title	Baronet (of Dunmoyle); 1919–1935	Succeeded by Ronald Ross
