= The Outspan =

A cover from 1944

The Outspan was a South African weekly magazine (1927–1957), continued as the fortnightly Personality (6 June 1957 – 23 December 1965). Its subtitle was "South Africa's Weekly for Everybody". It was published in Bloemfontein by The Friend Newspapers Ltd, first appearing on 4 March 1927, and is said to have been established following the pattern of the British Everybody's, which was set up in 1913.

The 1953 book Brown's South Africa describes The Outspan as

"The most widely-read magazine published in Southern Africa. Contains a wealth of first-class fiction and special articles, mostly by South African writers; generously illustrated ...",

and the 1989 South African Family Encyclopedia says that:

"The second longest-lasting (only Huisgenoot proved more durable) and, within the English-speaking community, perhaps the best-loved of all general interest magazines, was The Outspan ...".

== Contributors ==
Contributors are said to have included: Agatha Christie, Wernher von Braun, Admiral Donitz, Stuart Cloete, Denis Compton, Eddie Cantor, Major-General Sir Francis de Guingand, Donald Campbell, P. G. Wodehouse, Viscount Montgomery, Adolf Eichmann and Manuel Fangio.

Dorothy Kay produced two to four illustrations for The Outspan every week from 1927 to 1945, and Frank Bellamy published a series of illustrations in 1955–1956.

== Sample contents ==
The 28 January 1949 issue is described as containing "pictures, articles, features and fiction".

Items included:

- "The Beautiful Madness" by Mildred Cram
- Johannesberg
- What it means to provide 3,500,000 meals a year on the railways
- Gossip about players who appear on the South African screen
- "It all happened in a crowded Durban tearoom" by June Holme
- Cricket - the Australians will bring a strong pace attack to South Africa this year
- Smuts
- "My mother said I never should" by Ann Butler
