= James Owens Wylie =

Irish lawyer and judge (1845–1935)

James Owens Wylie PC (Ire) KC
- Born: 1845; Belfast, Ireland
- Died: 13 December 1935 (aged 89–90)
- Education: Royal Belfast Academical Institution, Queen's College, Belfast (BA, MA)
- Occupations: lawyer and senior judge
- Known for: Lord Justice of Ireland, Supreme Court of Judicature (Ireland)
- Political party: Liberal
- Parents: William Andrew Wylie (father); Jane Beatty (mother)

James Owens Wylie, PC (Ire) KC (1845 – 13 December 1935) was an Irish lawyer and senior judge.

Wylie was born in Belfast, the son of William Andrew Wylie and Jane Beatty. He was educated at the Royal Belfast Academical Institution and studied mathematics at Queen's College, Belfast (BA 1867, MA 1868), and was called to the Bar of Ireland in 1872. He stood as the Liberal candidate in the North Tyrone constituency in the 1886 United Kingdom general election, but lost to the Irish Unionist Alliance candidate.

In 1894, he was appointed a Queen's Counsel and became a bencher of King's Inn in 1904. He was admitted to the Privy Council of Ireland in 1909, and became a Lord Justice of Ireland in the Dublin Castle administration in 1914. He was a judge of the Supreme Court of Judicature (Ireland) and was Judicial Commissioner of the Irish Land Commission.
