= Dodgson Hamilton Madden =

Dodgson Hamilton Madden (28 March 1840 – 6 March 1928) was an Irish Unionist Alliance Member of Parliament (MP) in the United Kingdom Parliament. He was also a leading barrister, who held office as Serjeant-at-law, Attorney General for Ireland and subsequently as a judge of the Irish High Court. The Irish Unionists were the Irish wing of the Conservative Party.

== Biography ==
He was the only son of the Reverend Hugh Hamilton Madden of Templemore, County Tipperary, and Isabella Monck Mason, daughter of the barrister Henry Monck Mason. His father was Chancellor of the Diocese of Cashel; his grandfather and his great-grandfather, Hugh Hamilton (1729-1805), had also been Church of Ireland clergymen: Hugh became Bishop of Ossory. C.S. Lewis was a distant cousin on the Hamilton side of the family. Dodgson's father was descended from the author and scholar Samuel Madden (1686-1765), of whom Samuel Johnson said that all Ireland should honour his name.

He married firstly in 1868 Mary (Minna) Moore, daughter of Lewis Moore of Cremorgan, County Laois; she died in 1895. He married secondly in 1898 Jessie Isabelle Warburton, daughter of Richard Warburton of Garryhinch, County Offaly. He had no children by either marriage.

He attended Trinity College Dublin, where he was elected a Scholar, before being called to the Irish Bar in 1864. He became a Queen's Counsel (QC) in 1880 and Third Serjeant in 1887.

Madden wrote several books on legal topics; but his best-known work is The Diary of Master William Silence; a Study of Shakespeare and of Elizabethan Sport, an imaginative reconstruction of the world of Shakespeare's Falstaff, in which he made full use of his own knowledge of country sports, especially horse riding. His scholarship led Maurice Healy to describe him as a don who had strayed into the Courts. Of his legal works, the best known is Madden on Deeds, which remained the standard work on the subject for many years.

Madden was Solicitor-General for Ireland 1888–1890, and Attorney-General for Ireland in 1890–1892. He was made a member of the Privy Council of Ireland on 9 December 1889. Though not much interested in politics, he was diligent in performing his duties, and worked well with Arthur Balfour, the Chief Secretary for Ireland, particularly on the issue of land purchase. He was MP for Dublin University 1887–1892. He was subsequently Vice-Chancellor of the University of Dublin 1895–1919.

Madden left the House of Commons when he was appointed to the office of Justice of the Queen's Bench Division of the Irish High Court in 1892, an office which he held until 1919 when he retired and moved to England.

== Reputation ==
Maurice Healy in his memoir The Old Munster Circuit described him with respect and affection: "he was one of the most charming judges I ever met". Yet Healy did not rate Madden especially highly as a judge. Admittedly his reputation was bound to suffer in comparison to such outstanding contemporaries as Christopher Palles and Hugh Holmes, in an era when the quality of Irish judges was as high as it has ever been. Healy recalled that to appear before Madden was a pleasure, especially if one could think of an appropriate literary reference, but thought that his actual judgments were "weak and diffuse". This verdict was probably too severe; in particular, Madden's judgment in Boyers v Duke remains a valuable decision on the formation of business contracts. There are many tributes to his courtesy, generosity and hospitality.

== Notable judgments ==
His judgment in Powell v McGlynn and Bradlaw, concerning liability for a runaway pony, affords an excellent example of his judicial style. The question of whether one defendant employed the other depended partly on whether the expression "humph" had any legal meaning. Madden, drawing on his knowledge of English literature, cited Jane Austen and Sir Walter Scott, among other authors, to prove that "humph" had a definite meaning, namely an expression of disagreement.

His judgment in Boyers v Duke is a leading decision on the concept of offer and acceptance in contract law, and in particular, the precise meaning of a quotation by a seller of goods. Madden held that a quotation cannot be an offer to enter a contract, but is merely an indication of the terms on which the seller will do business. Applying normal rules of commercial practice, he found that if every quotation was in itself an offer which could lead to a binding contract, the business in question would be so swamped with obligations which it could not meet that it might well go bankrupt. Therefore, it followed that the letter of acceptance by the prospective buyer was in fact the first offer. The judgment has been described as an excellent example of how commercial practice may influence the development of the law.

Parliament of the United Kingdom
Preceded by Hugh Holmes and David Robert Plunket	Member of Parliament for Dublin University; 1887–1892; With: David Robert Plunket	Succeeded by Edward Carson and David Robert Plunket
Legal offices
Preceded by Peter O'Brien	Solicitor-General for Ireland; 1888–1890	Succeeded by John Atkinson
Preceded by Peter O'Brien	Attorney-General for Ireland; 1890–1892	Succeeded by John Atkinson
